= FIL World Luge Natural Track Championships =

World championship

The FIL World Luge Natural Track Championships, part of the International Luge Federation (FIL) have taken place on an almost biennial basis in non-Winter Olympics years since 1979.

== Background ==
These championships are held for and upon naturbahn or natural tracks, runs packed with snow and ice but featuring no artificial banking or artificial refrigeration as would be found on artificial and refrigerated tracks used in the mainstream Luge competitions. (See FIL World Luge Championships for all artificial track events that have taken place since 1955.)

The natural track discipline is an ancient and somewhat more organic form of the sport, requiring more rider intervention and hard braking over rougher tracks made across natural undulations of the path. That intervention, in turn, breaks the track up more for later riders and makes it more unpredictable. As a result, the discipline is often not as fast, but more physical and technical than luge on kunstbahn on the artificial, refrigerated tracks that are shared with bobsleigh and skeleton races. The concept of natural track can be compared with the cross-country discipline in athletics or skiing, or the cyclo-cross and mountain bike disciplines in cycling.

Although natural track luge is not an Olympic event, and venues are limited by climate and topology, FIL remains committed to supporting its inclusion in future Winter Games.

== Host cities ==
- 1979: Inzing, Austria
- 1980: Moos in Passeier, Italy
- 1982: Feld am See, Austria
- 1984: Kreuth, West Germany
- 1986: Fénis-Aosta, Italy
- 1988: Montreux, Switzerland (cancelled)
- 1990: Gsies, Italy
- 1992: Bad Goisern, Austria
- 1994: Gsies, Italy
- 1996: Oberperfuss, Austria
- 1998: Rautavaara, Finland
- 2000: Olang, Italy
- 2001: Stein an der Enns, Austria
- 2003: Železniki, Slovenia
- 2005: Latsch, Italy
- 2007: Grande Prairie, Alberta, Canada
- 2009: Moos in Passeier, Italy
- 2011: Umhausen, Austria
- 2013: Deutschnofen, Italy
- 2015: Sankt Sebastian, Styria, Austria
- 2017 : Vatra Dornei, Romania
- 2019: Latzfons, Italy
- 2021: Umhausen, Austria
- 2023: Deutschnofen, Italy
- 2025: Tyrol, Austria

== Men's singles ==
Debuted: 1979.

Games	Gold	Silver	Bronze
1979 Inzing	Werner Prantl (AUT)	Damiano Lugon (ITA)	Erich Graber (ITA)
1980 Passeier	Erich Graber (ITA)	Damiano Lugon (ITA)	Otto Bachman (ITA)
1982 Feld am See	Gerhard Pircher (AUT)	Otto Bachman (ITA)	Werner Prantl (AUT)
1984 Kreuth	Alfred Kogler (AUT)	Giuseppe Cerise (ITA)	Willi Danklmaier (AUT)
1986 Fénis-Aosta	Gerhard Pilz (AUT)	Damiano Lugon (ITA)	Harald Steinhauser (ITA)
1990 Gsies	Gerhard Pilz (AUT)	Corrado Herin (ITA)	Harald Steinhauser (ITA)
1992 Bad Goisern	Gerhard Pilz (AUT)	Willi Danklmaier (AUT)	Franz Obrist (ITA)
1994 Gsies	Gerhard Pilz (AUT)	Franz Obrist (ITA)	Erhard Mahlknecht (ITA)
1996 Oberperfuss	Gerhard Pilz (AUT)	Anton Blasbichler (ITA)	Franz Obrist (ITA)
1998 Rautavaara	Reinhard Gruber (ITA)	Martin Gruber (ITA)	Anton Blasbichler (ITA)
2000 Olang-Valdaora	Gerald Kallan (AUT)	Gerhard Pilz (AUT)	Anton Blasbichler (ITA)
2001 Stein an der Enns	Anton Blasbichler (ITA)	Ferdinand Hirzegger (AUT)	Gerhard Pilz (AUT)
2003 Železniki	Robert Batkowski (AUT)	Gerhard Pilz (AUT)	Gerald Kallan (AUT)
2005 Latsch	Anton Blasbichler (ITA)	Andreas Castiglioni (ITA)	Patrick Pigneter (ITA)
2007 Grande Prairie	Gernot Schwab (AUT)	Gerhard Pilz (AUT)	Patrick Pigneter (ITA)
2009 Moos	Patrick Pigneter (ITA)	Thomas Kammerlander (AUT)	Thomas Schopf (AUT)
2011 Umhausen	Gerald Kammerlander (AUT)	Robert Batkowski (AUT)	Patrick Pigneter (ITA)
2013 Deutschnofen	Patrick Pigneter (ITA)	Thomas Schopf (AUT)	Alex Gruber (ITA)
2015 St. Sebastian	Patrick Pigneter (ITA)	Alex Gruber (ITA)	Florian Breitenberger (ITA)
2017 Vatra Dornei	Alex Gruber (ITA)	Juri Talykh (RUS)	Thomas Kammerlander (AUT)
2019 Latzfons	Alex Gruber (ITA)	Thomas Kammerlander (AUT)	Michael Scheikl (AUT)
2021 Umhausen	Thomas Kammerlander (AUT)	Alex Gruber (ITA)	Patrick Pigneter (ITA)
2023 Deutschnofen	Alex Gruber (ITA)	Michael Scheikl (AUT)	Thomas Kammerlander (AUT)
2025 Kühtai	Michael Scheikl (AUT)	Daniel Gruber (ITA)	Patrick Pigneter (ITA)

== Women's singles ==
Debuted: 1979.

Games	Gold	Silver	Bronze
1979 Inzing	Delia Vaudan (ITA)	Ingrid Zameter (ITA)	Roswitha Fischer (ITA)
1980 Passeier	Delia Vaudan (ITA)	Christa Fontana (ITA)	Roswitha Fischer (ITA)
1982 Feld am See	Herta Hafner (ITA)	Hilde Fuchs (AUT)	Paula Peintner (ITA)
1984 Kreuth	Delia Vaudan (ITA)	Paula Peintner (ITA)	Irmgard Lanthaler (ITA)
1986 Fénis-Aosta	Irmgard Lanthaler (ITA)	Delia Vaudan (ITA)	Helga Pichler (ITA)
1990 Gsies	Jeanette Koppensteiner (AUT)	Irene Koch (AUT)	Lyubov Panyutina (URS)
1992 Bad Goisern	Lyubov Panyutina (CIS)	Elvira Holzknecht (AUT)	Irene Koch (AUT)
1994 Gsies	Beatrix Mahlknecht (ITA)	Irene Zechner (AUT)	Doris Haselrieder (ITA)
1996 Oberperfuss	Irene Zechner (AUT)	Elvira Holzknecht (AUT)	Sandra Mariner (AUT)
1998 Rautavaara	Lyubov Panyutina (RUS)	Christa Gietl (ITA)	Sonja Steinacher (ITA)
2000 Olang-Valdaora	Yekaterina Lavrentyeva (RUS)	Sonja Steinacher (ITA)	Elvira Holzknecht (AUT)
2001 Stein an der Enns	Sonja Steinacher (ITA)	Renate Gietl (ITA)	Sandra Mariner (AUT)
2003 Železniki	Sonja Steinacher (ITA)	Yekaterina Lavrentyeva (RUS)	Irene Mitterstieler (ITA)
2005 Latsch	Yekaterina Lavrentyeva (RUS)	Barbara Abart (ITA)	Renate Gietl (ITA)
2007 Grande Prairie	Yekaterina Lavrentyeva (RUS)	Yuliya Vetlova (RUS)	Melanie Batkowski (AUT)
2009 Moos	Renate Gietl (ITA)	Yekaterina Lavrentyeva (RUS)	Renate Kasslatter (ITA)
2011 Umhausen	Renate Gietl (ITA)	Yekaterina Lavrentyeva (RUS)	Melanie Schwarz (ITA)
2013 Deutschnofen	Yekaterina Lavrentyeva (RUS)	Melanie Schwarz (ITA)	Evelin Lanthaler (ITA)
2015 St. Sebastian	Evelin Lanthaler (ITA)	Yekaterina Lavrentyeva (RUS)	Greta Pinggera (ITA)
2017 Vatra Dornei	Greta Pinggera (ITA)	Evelin Lanthaler (ITA)	Tina Unterberger (AUT)
2019 Latzfons	Evelin Lanthaler (ITA)	Greta Pinggera (ITA)	Tina Unterberger (AUT)
2021 Umhausen	Evelin Lanthaler (ITA)	Yekaterina Lavrentyeva (RLF)	Tina Unterberger (AUT)
2023 Deutschnofen	Evelin Lanthaler (ITA)	Greta Pinggera (ITA)	Tina Unterberger (AUT)
2025 Kühtai	Evelin Lanthaler (ITA)	Riccard Ruetz (AUT)	Jenny Castiglioni (ITA)

== Men's doubles ==
Debuted: 1979.

Games	Gold	Silver	Bronze
1979 Inzing	Damiano Lugon; Andrea Millet; Italy	Werner Mücke; Helmut Huter; Austria	Werner Prantl; Florian Prantl; Austria
1980 Passeier	Oswald Pornbacher; Raimund Pigneter; Italy	Martin Jud; Harald Steinhauser; Italy	Werner Mücke; Helmut Huter; Austria
1982 Feld am See	Andreas Jud; Ernst Oberhammer; Italy	Alfred Kogler; Franz Huber; Austria	Werner Prantl; Florian Prantl; Austria
1984 Kreuth	Andreas Jud; Ernst Oberhammer; Italy	Martin Jud; Harald Steinhauser; Italy	Alfred Kogler; Franz Huber; Austria
1986 Fénis-Aosta	Almir Bentemps; Corrado Herin; Italy	Andreas Jud; Ernst Oberhammer; Italy	Arnold Lunger; Gunther Steinhauser; Italy
1990 Gsies	Andreas Jud; Hannes Pichler; Italy	Almir Bentemps; Corrado Herin; Italy	Walter Mauracher; Georg Eberhardter; Austria
1992 Bad Goisern	Almir Bentemps; Corrado Herin; Italy	Roland Wolf; Stefan Kögler; Austria	Michael Bischofer; Herbert Kögl; Austria
1994 Gsies	Manfred Graber; Gunther Steinhauser; Italy	Jurgen Pezzi; Christian Hafner; Italy	Roland Niedermair; Hubert Burger; Italy
1996 Oberperfuss	Reinhard Beer; Herbert Kögl; Austria	Andi Ruetz; Helmut Ruetz; Austria	Martin Psenner; Arthur Konig; Italy
1998 Rautavaara	Andi Ruetz; Helmut Ruetz; Austria	Manfred Graber; Hubert Burger; Italy	Reinhard Beer; Herbert Kögl; Austria
2000 Olang-Valdaora	Armin Mair; David Mair; Italy	Reinhard Beer; Herbert Kögl; Austria	Andrzej Laszczak; Damian Waniczek; Poland
2001 Stein an der Enns	Wolfgang Schopf; Andreas Schopf; Austria	Armin Mair; David Mair; Italy	Peter Lechner; Peter Braunegger; Austria
2003 Železniki	Wolfgang Schopf; Andreas Schopf; Austria	Pavel Porzhnev; Ivan Lazarev; Russia	Harald Kleinhofer; Gerhard Mühlbacher; Austria
2005 Latsch	Pavel Porzhnev; Ivan Lazarev; Russia	Armin Mair; Johannes Hofer; Italy	Andrzej Laszczak; Damian Waniczek; Poland
2007 Grande Prairie	Pavel Porzhnev; Ivan Lazarev; Russia	Aleksandr Yegorov; Pyotr Popov; Russia	Christian Schatz; Gerhard Mühlbacher; Austria
2009 Moos	Patrick Pigneter; Florian Clara; Italy	Christian Schopf; Andreas Schopf; Austria	Andrzej Laszczak; Damian Waniczek; Poland
2011 Umhausen	Pavel Porzhnev; Ivan Lazarev; Russia	Patrick Pigneter; Florian Clara; Italy	Andrzej Laszczak; Damian Waniczek; Poland
2013 Deutschnofen	Patrick Pigneter; Florian Clara; Italy	Christian Schopf; Andreas Schopf; Austria	Thomas Schopf; Andreas Schöpf; Austria
2015 St. Sebastian	Patrick Pigneter; Florian Clara; Italy	Rupert Brueggler; Tobias Angerer; Austria	Pavel Porzhnev; Ivan Lazarev; Russia
2017 Vatra Dornei	Rupert Brueggler; Tobias Angerer; Austria	Patrick Pigneter; Florian Clara; Italy	Aleksandr Martyanov; Ivan Rodin; Russia
2019 Latzfons	Patrick Pigneter; Florian Clara; Italy	Pavel Porzhnev; Ivan Lazarev; Russia	Patrick Lambacher; Matthias Lambacher; Italy
2021 Umhausen	Patrick Pigneter; Florian Clara; Italy	Patrick Lambacher; Matthias Lambacher; Italy	Christoph Regensburger; Dominik Holzknecht; Austria
2023 Deutschnofen	Patrick Lambacher; Matthias Lambacher; Italy	Patrick Pigneter; Florian Clara; Italy	Matevz Vertelj; Vid Kralj; Slovenia
2025 Kühtai	Patrick Lambacher; Matthias Lambacher; Italy	Maximilian Pichler; Nico Edlinger; Austria	Tobias Paur; Andreas Hofer; Italy

== Mixed team ==
Debuted: 2001.

Games	Gold	Silver	Bronze
2001 Stein an der Enns	Sonja Steinacher; Anton Blasbichler; Armin Mair; David Mair; Italy	Marlies Wagner; Gerhard Pilz; Peter Lechner; Peter Braunegger; Austria	Renate Gietl; Martin Gruber; Thomas Graf; Michael Graf; Italy
2005 Latsch	Melanie Batkowski; Robert Batkowski; Reinhard Beer; Herbert Kögl; Austria	Yekaterina Lavrentyeva; Aleksey Lebedev; Pavel Porzhnev; Ivan Lazarev; Russia	Renate Gietl; Anton Blasbichler; Armin Mair; Johannes Hofer; Italy
2007 Grande Prairie	Melanie Batkowski; Gernot Schwab; Christian Schatz; Gerhard Mühlbacher; Austria	Renate Gietl; Patrick Pigneter; Patrick Pigneter; Florian Clara; Italy	Marlies Wagner; Gerald Kammerlander; Reinhard Beer; Herbert Kögl; Austria
2009 Moos	Renate Gietl; Anton Blasbichler; Patrick Pigneter; Florian Clara; Italy	Melanie Batkowski; Thomas Schopf; Christian Schopf; Andreas Schopf; Austria	Yekaterina Lavrentyeva; Pavel Porzhnev; Ivan Lazarev; Russia
2011 Umhausen	Anton Blasbichler; Renate Gietl; Patrick Pigneter; Florian Clara; Italy	Gerald Kammerlander; Melanie Batkowski; Christian Schatz; Gerhard Mühlbacher; Austria	Juri Talykh; Yekaterina Lavrentyeva; Pavel Porzhnev; Ivan Lazarev; Russia
2013 Deutschnofen	Alex Gluber; Melanie Schwarz; Patrick Pigneter; Florian Clara; Italy	Stanislav Kovshik; Yekaterina Lavrentyeva; Pavel Porzhnev; Ivan Lazarev; Russia	Florian Breitenberger; Evelin Lanthaler; Hannes Clara; Stefan Gruber; Italy
2017 Vatra Dornei	Thomas Kammerlander; Tina Unterberger; Rupert Brueggler; Tobias Angerer; Austria	Alex Gruber; Greta Pinggera; Patrick Pigneter; Florian Clara; Italy	Juri Talykh; Svetlana Zaravina; Aleksey Martyanov; Ivan Rodin; Russia
2019 Latzfons	Evelin Lanthaler; Patrick Pigneter; Alex Gruber; Italy	Tina Unterberger; Michael Scheikl; Thomas Kammerlander; Austria	Yekaterina Lavrentyeva; Stanislav Kovshik; Juri Talykh; Russia
2021 Umhausen	Evelin Lanthaler; Alex Gruber; Italy	Tina Unterberger; Thomas Kammerlander; Austria	Yekaterina Lavrentyeva; Aleksandr Yegorov; Russian Luge Federation
2023 Deutschnofen	Evelin Lanthaler; Alex Gruber; Italy	Tina Unterberger; Michael Scheikl; Austria	Lisa Walch; Vincent Streit; Germany
2025 Kühtai	Evelin Lanthaler; Daniel Gruber; Italy	Riccarda Ruetz; Michael Scheikl; Austria	Lisa Walch; Simon Dietz; Germany

== Medal table ==
Updated as of the 2025 FIL World Luge Natural Track Championships.

Rank	Nation	Gold	Silver	Bronze	Total
1	Italy	50	40	38	128
2	Austria	24	31	30	85
3	Russia	8	11	6	25
4	CIS	1	0	0	1
5	Russian Luge Federation	0	1	1	2
6	Poland	0	0	4	4
7	Germany	0	0	2	2
8	Slovenia	0	0	1	1
8	Soviet Union	0	0	1	1
Totals (9 entries)		83	83	83	249
