= Renate Gietl =

Italian luger

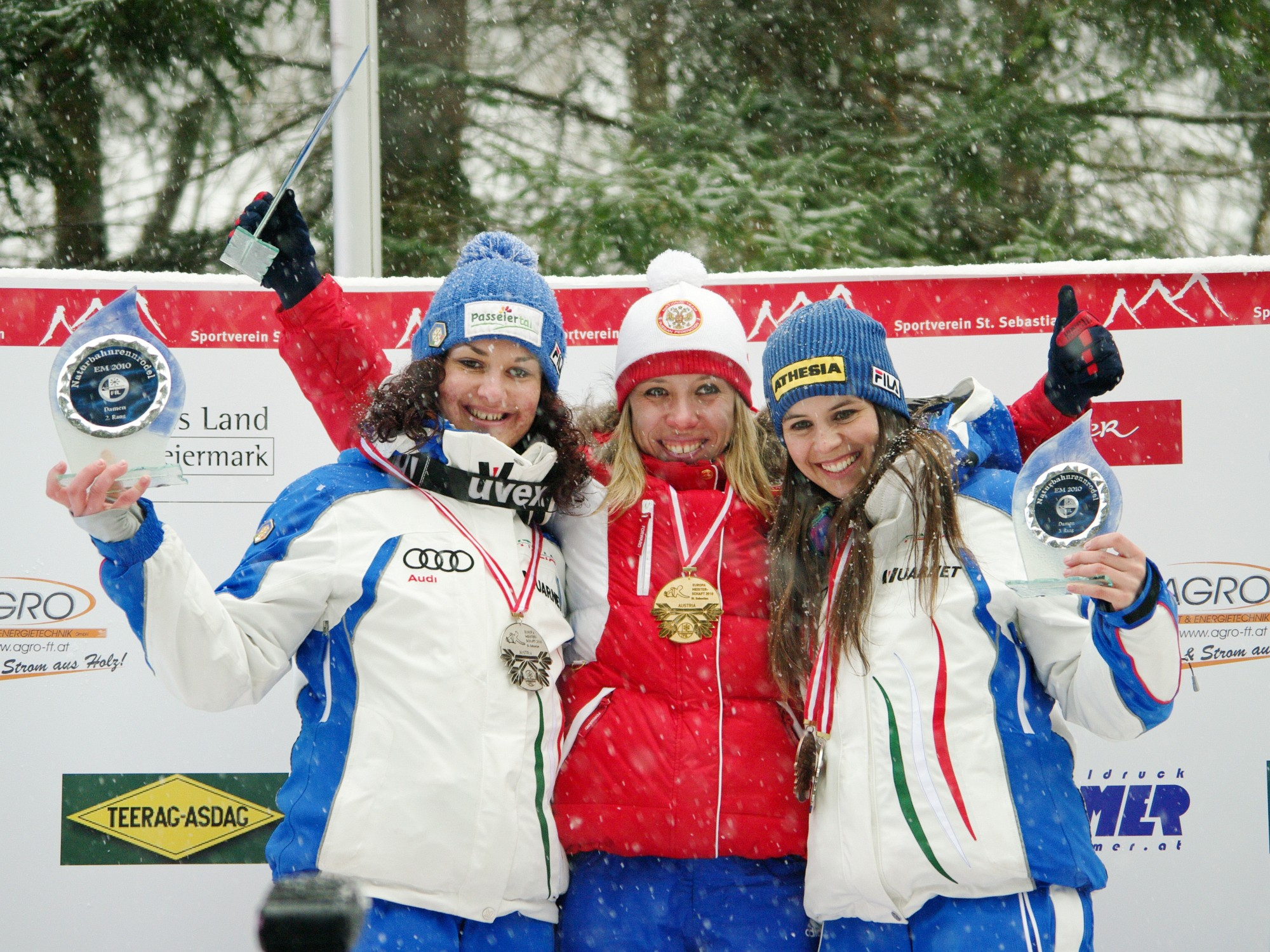
- Gietl (right) with Evelin Lanthaler (left) and Yekaterina Lavrentyeva (center) at the FIL European Luge Natural Track Championships 2010.
Medal record
Natural track luge
Representing Italy
World Championships
Gold medal – first place	2009 Moos	Women's singles
Gold medal – first place	2009 Moos	Mixed team
Gold medal – first place	2011 Umhausen	Women's singles
Gold medal – first place	2011 Umhausen	Mixed team
Silver medal – second place	2001 Stein an der Enns	Women's singles
Silver medal – second place	2007 Grande Prairie	Mixed team
Bronze medal – third place	2003 Železniki	Mixed team
Bronze medal – third place	2005 Latsch	Women's singles
Bronze medal – third place	2005 Latsch	Mixed team
European Championships
Silver medal – second place	2010 St. Sebastian	Mixed team
Bronze medal – third place	2006 Umhausen	Women's singles
Bronze medal – third place	2008 Olang	Women's singles
Bronze medal – third place	2010 St. Sebastian	Women's singles

Renate Gietl (born 10 January 1982) is an Italian luger who has competed since 1997. A natural track luger, she won nine medals at the FIL World Luge Natural Track Championships with a four medals in women's singles (Gold: 2009, 2011); Silver: 2001, Bronze: 2005) and five medals in the mixed team event (Gold: 2009, 2011; Silver: 2007, Bronze: 2003, 2005).

Gietl also earned four medals at the FIL European Luge Natural Track Championships with a silver (mixed team: 2010) and three bronzes (women's singles: 2006, 2008, 2010).
