= Anton Blasbichler =

Italian luger (born 1972)

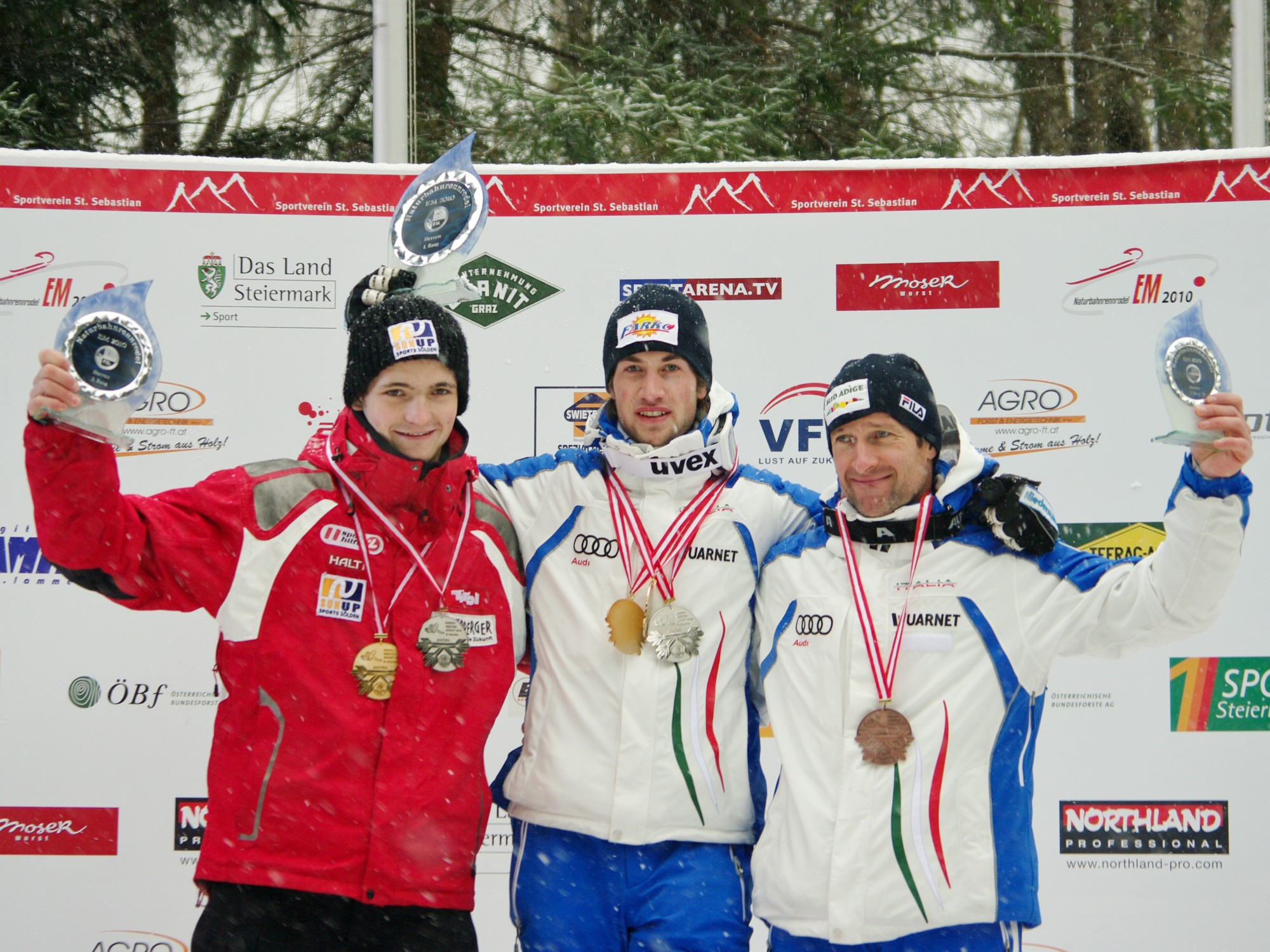
- Blasbichler (right) with Thomas Kammerlander (left) and Patrick Pigneter (center) at the FIL European Luge Natural Track Championships 2010.

Personal information
- Born: 18 February 1972 (age 54)
Medal record
Natural track luge
World Championships
Gold medal – first place	2001 Stein an der Enns	Men's singles
Gold medal – first place	2003 Železniki	Mixed team
Gold medal – first place	2005 Latsch	Men's singles
Gold medal – first place	2009 Moos	Mixed team
Gold medal – first place	2011 Umhausen	Mixed team
Silver medal – second place	1996 Oberperfuss	Men's singles
Bronze medal – third place	1998 Rautavaara	Men's singles
Bronze medal – third place	2000 Olang-Valadora	Men's singles
Bronze medal – third place	2005 Latsch	Mixed team
European Championships
Gold medal – first place	1993 Stein an der Enns	Men's singles
Gold medal – first place	1999 Szczyrk	Men's singles
Silver medal – second place	2008 Olang	Men's singles
Bronze medal – third place	2010 St. Sebastian	Men's singles

Anton Blasbichler (born 18 February 1972) was an Italian luger who has competed since 1989. A natural track luger, he won nine medals at the FIL World Luge Natural Track Championships with four golds (Singles: 2001, 2005, Team: 2003, 2009, 2011), one silver (Singles: 1996), and three bronzes (Singles: 1998, 1996, Team: 2005).

At the FIL European Luge Natural Track Championships, Blasbichler won four medals in the men's singles event with two golds (1993, 1999), a silver (2008), and a bronze (2010.
