= FIL World Luge Natural Track Championships 2013 =

Coordinates: 47°07′09″N 10°55′47″E

The FIL World Luge Natural Track Championships 2013 took place 23–27 January in Deutschnofen-Nova Ponente, Italy.

== Men's singles ==
Medal	Athlete	Time
Gold	Patrick Pigneter (ITA)	2:44.11
Silver	Thomas Schopf (AUT)	+0,06 s
Bronze	Alex Gruber (ITA)	0,58 s

== Women's singles ==
Medal	Athlete	Time
Gold	Yekaterina Lavrentyeva (RUS)	2:46.87
Silver	Melanie Schwarz (ITA)	+2,00 s
Bronze	Evelin Lanthaler (ITA)	+2,22 s

== Men's doubles ==
Medal	Athlete	Time
Gold	Italy (Patrick Pigneter, Florian Clara)	1:56.08
Silver	Austria (Christian Schopf, Andreas Schopf)	+1,30 s
Bronze	Austria (Thomas Schopf, Andreas Schöpf)	+1,47

== Mixed team ==
Medal	Athlete	Points
Gold	Italy 1 (Alex Gruber, Melanie Schwarz, Patrick Pigneter, Florian Clara)	79
Silver	Russia (Stanislav Kovshik, Yekaterina Lavrentyeva, Pavel Porzhnev, Ivan Lazarev)	72
Bronze	Italy 2 (Florian Breitenberger, Evelin Lanthaler, Hannes Clara, Stefan Gruber)	71

== Medal table ==
Rank	Nation	Gold	Silver	Bronze	Total
1	Italy (ITA)	3	1	3	7
2	Russia (RUS)	1	1	1	3
3	Austria (AUT)	0	2	1	3
Totals (3 entries)		4	4	5	13

== Notes and references ==
- FIL 2012-13 Natural Track World Cup Schedule.
- Official website (in German)
