= FIL World Luge Natural Track Championships 1998 =

The FIL World Luge Natural Track Championships 1998 took place in Rautavaara, Finland. It marked the first time the championships were held outside the traditional locations of Austria, Germany, or Italy.

== Men's singles ==
| Medal | Athlete | Time |
|---|---|---|
| Gold | Reinhard Gruber (ITA) | |
| Silver | Martin Gruber (ITA) | |
| Bronze | Anton Blasbichler (ITA) | |

Reinhard Gruber ended Gerhard Pilz's reign of five straight World Championships in men's singles natural track luge.

== Women's singles ==
| Medal | Athlete | Time |
|---|---|---|
| Gold | Lyubov Panyutina (RUS) | |
| Silver | Christa Gietl (ITA) | |
| Bronze | Sonja Steinacher (ITA) | |

Panyutina won her third medal of the championships in the 1990s representing her third different country (1990: bronze for the Soviet Union, 1992: gold for the Commonwealth of Independent States).

== Men's doubles ==
| Medal | Athlete | Time |
|---|---|---|
| Gold | Austria (Andi Ruetz, Helmut Ruetz) | |
| Silver | Italy (Manfred Graber, Hubert Burger) | |
| Bronze | Austria (Reinhard Beer, Herbert Kögl) | |

== Medal table ==
| Rank | Nation | Gold | Silver | Bronze | Total |
|---|---|---|---|---|---|
| 1 | Italy (ITA) | 1 | 3 | 2 | 6 |
| 2 | Austria (AUT) | 1 | 0 | 1 | 2 |
| 3 | Russia (RUS) | 1 | 0 | 0 | 1 |
| Totals (3 entries) | | 3 | 3 | 3 | 9 |
