= Almir Bétemps =

Italian luger

Medal record

Natural track luge

World Championships
Gold medal – first place	1986 Fénis	Men's doubles
Gold medal – first place	1992 Bad Goisern	Men's doubles
Silver medal – second place	1990 Gsies	Men's doubles

European Championships
Gold medal – first place	1993 Stein an der Enns	Men's doubles
Silver medal – second place	1985 Szczyrk	Men's doubles
Silver medal – second place	1987 Jesenice	Men's doubles

Almir Bétemps (French pronunciation: [betɑ̃]) is a former Italian luger, originally from the Aosta Valley, who competed from the mid-1980s to the early 1990s. A natural track luger, he won three medals in the men's doubles event at the FIL World Luge Natural Track Championships with two golds (1986, 1992) and a silver 1990).

Bétemps also won three medals in the men's doubles event at the FIL European Luge Natural Track Championships with one gold (1993) and two silvers (1985, 1987).

Bétemps' doubles partner during the World Luge Natural Track Championships was Corrado Hérin. Bétemps posted a tribute to Hérin after the latter's death in an ultraflight plane accident on March 31, 2019.
