= Harald Kleinhofer =

Austrian luger (1974–2016)

Medal record

Natural track luge

Representing Austria

World Championships
Bronze medal – third place	2003 Železniki	Men's doubles

Harald Kleinhofer (21 May 1974 – 28 January 2016) was an Austrian luger who competed from 1998 to 2005. A natural track luger, he won the bronze medal in the men's doubles event at the 2003 FIL World Luge Natural Track Championships in Železniki, Slovenia.
