= FIL World Luge Natural Track Championships 2015 =

The 20th FIL World Luge Natural Track Championships 2015 took place 15–18 January in St. Sebastian, Austria.

== Men's singles ==
Medal	Athlete	Time
Gold	Patrick Pigneter (ITA)	3:35.88
Silver	Alex Gruber (ITA)	+0,61 s
Bronze	Florian Breitenberger (ITA)	1,05 s

== Women's singles ==
Medal	Athlete	Time
Gold	Evelin Lanthaler (ITA)	3:43.35
Silver	Yekaterina Lavrentyeva (RUS)	+0,73 s
Bronze	Greta Pinggera (ITA)	+1,00 s

== Men's doubles ==
Medal	Athlete	Time
Gold	Italy (Patrick Pigneter, Florian Clara)	2:29.53
Silver	Austria (Rupert Brüggler, Tobias Angerer)	+2,96 s
Bronze	Russia (Pawel Porschnew, Iwan Lasarew)	+3,04

== Notes and references ==
- FIL 2014-15 Natural Track World Cup Schedule.
