= Ernst Oberhammer =

Italian luger

Medal record

Natural track luge

World Championships
| Gold medal – first place | 1982 Feld am See | Men's doubles |
| Gold medal – first place | 1984 Kreuth | Men's doubles |
| Silver medal – second place | 1986 Fénis-Aosta | Men's doubles |

European Championships
| Gold medal – first place | 1987 Jesenice | Men's doubles |
| Bronze medal – third place | 1985 Szczyrk | Men's doubles |

Ernst Oberhammer was an Italian luger who competed during the 1980s. A natural track luger, he won three medals in the men's doubles event at the FIL World Luge Natural Track Championships with two golds (1982, 1984) and one silver (1986).

Oberhammer also won two medals in the men's doubles event at the FIL European Luge Natural Track Championships with a gold in 1987 and a bronze in 1985.
