= Reinhard Beer =

Austrian luger (born 1969)

Medal record

Natural track luge

Representing Austria

World Championships
| Gold medal – first place | 1996 Oberperfuss | Men's doubles |
| Gold medal – first place | 2005 Latsch | Mixed team |
| Silver medal – second place | 2000 Olang-Valadora | Men's doubles |
| Bronze medal – third place | 1998 Rautavaara | Men's doubles |
| Bronze medal – third place | 2007 Grand Prairie | Mixed team |

European Championships
| Silver medal – second place | 2002 Frantschach | Men's doubles |
| Bronze medal – third place | 1997 Passiria | Men's doubles |

Reinhard Beer (born 2 October 1969) is an Austrian luger who has competed since 1990. A natural track luger, he won five medals at the FIL World Luge Natural Track Championships with two gold (Men's doubles: 1996, Mixed team: 2005), one silver (2000), and two bronzes (Men's doubles: 1998, Mixed team: 2007).

Beer also won two medals in the men's doubles event at the FIL European Luge Natural Track Championships with a silver in 2002 and a bronze in 1997.
