= Harald Steinhauser =

Italian luger

Medal record

Natural track luge

World Championships
Silver medal – second place	1980 Passier	Men's doubles
Silver medal – second place	1984 Kreuth	Men's doubles
Bronze medal – third place	1986 Fénis-Aosta	Men's singles
Bronze medal – third place	1990 Gsies	Men's singles

European Championships
Silver medal – second place	1987 Jesenice	Men's singles
Bronze medal – third place	1991 Fié allo Sciliar	Men's singles

Harald Steinhauser was an Italian luger who competed in the 1980s and early 1990s. A natural track luger, he won four medals at the FIL World Luge Natural Track Championships with two silvers in the doubles (1980, 1984) and two bronzes in the singles (1986, 1990).

Steinhauser also won two men's singles medal at the FIL European Luge Natural Track Championships with a silver in 1987 and a bronze in 1991.
