= Roman Molvistov =

Russian luger (born 1981)

Medal record

Natural track luge

Representing Russia

European Championships
Silver medal – second place	2004 Hüttau	Men's doubles
Bronze medal – third place	2006 Umhausen	Men's doubles

Roman Molvistov (born February 10, 1981) is a Russian luger who has competed since the 2000s. A natural track luger, he won two medals in the men's doubles event at the FIL European Luge Natural Track Championships with a silver in 2004 and a bronze in 2006.
