= Alex Gruber =

Italian luger (born 1992)

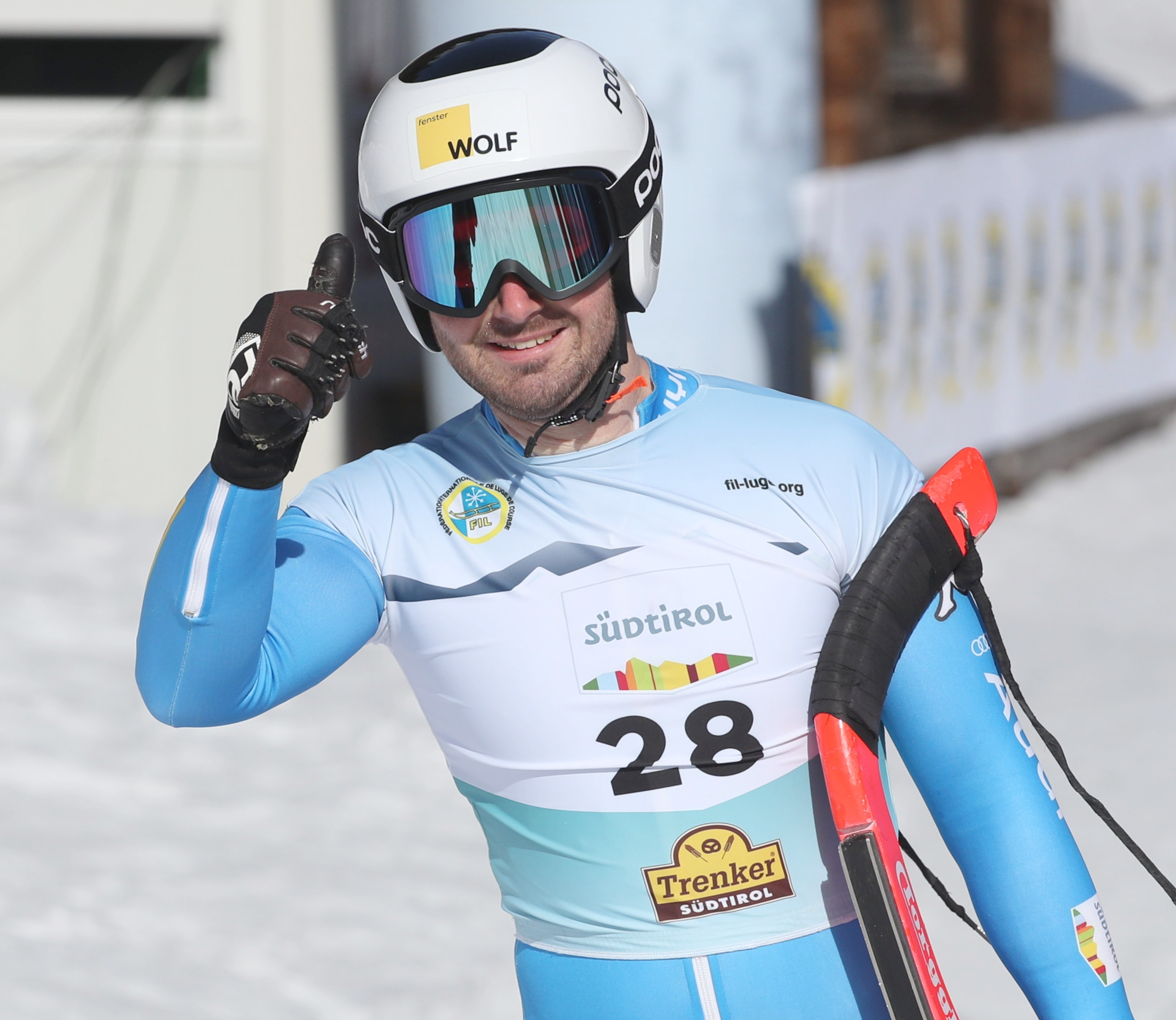
- Gruber in 2022

Personal information
- Born: 21 December 1992 (age 33)
Medal record
Men's natural track luge
Representing Italy
World Championships
| Gold medal – first place | 2013 Deutschnofen | Mixed team |
| Gold medal – first place | 2017 Vatra Dornei | Singles |
| Gold medal – first place | 2019 Latzfons | Singles |
| Gold medal – first place | 2019 Latzfons | Mixed team |
| Gold medal – first place | 2021 Umhausen | Mixed team |
| Gold medal – first place | 2023 Deutschnofen | Singles |
| Gold medal – first place | 2023 Deutschnofen | Mixed team |
| Silver medal – second place | 2015 Sebastian | Singles |
| Silver medal – second place | 2017 Vatra Dornei | Mixed team |
| Silver medal – second place | 2021 Umhausen | Singles |
| Bronze medal – third place | 2013 Deutschnofen | Singles |
European Championships
| Silver medal – second place | 2010 St. Sebastian | Mixed team |

Alex Gruber (born 21 December 1992) is an Italian luger who has competed since 2004. A natural track luger, he is a seven-time World Champion.

== Career ==
He won a silver medal in the mixed team event at the FIL European Luge Natural Track Championships 2010 in St. Sebastian. Austria.
