= Michael Graf =

Italian luger

Medal record

Natural track luge

World Championships
Bronze medal – third place	2003 Železniki	Mixed team

Michael Graf is an Italian luger who competed during the early 2000s. A natural track luger, he won the bronze medal in the mixed team event at the 2003 FIL World Luge Natural Track Championships in Železniki.
