= FIL World Luge Natural Track Championships 2025 =

The 2025 FIL World Luge Natural Track Championships (the 25th edition) were held from 17 to 19 January 2025 at the newly constructed Kühtai natural track in Tyrol, Austria. Four titles were contested: men’s singles, women’s singles, doubles, and a mixed team event. The hosts opened the championships with a festive ceremony on 17 January, and by 19 January the medals had been decided across all disciplines.

== Medal summary ==
=== Medal table ===
Rank	Nation	Gold	Silver	Bronze	Total
1	Italy	3	1	3	7
2	Austria	1	3	0	3
3	Germany	0	0	1	1
Totals		4	4	4	12

=== Medalists by event ===
Event	Gold	Silver	Bronze
Men's singles	Michael Scheikl; Austria	Daniel Gruber; Italy	Patrick Pigneter; Italy
Women's singles	Evelin Lanthaler; Italy	Riccarda Ruetz; Austria	Jenny Castiglioni; Italy
Doubles	ITA; Peter Lambacher; Matthias Lambacher	AUT; Maximilian Pichler; Nico Edlinger	ITA; Andreas Hofer; Tobias Paur
Team event	Italy (ITA)	Austria (AUT)	Germany (GER)
