= Gerald Kallan =

Austrian luger (born 1979)

Medal record

Natural track luge

Representing Austria

World Championships
| Gold medal – first place | 2000 Olang-Valadora | Men's singles |
| Bronze medal – third place | 2003 Železniki | Men's singles |

European Championships
| Bronze medal – third place | 1999 Szczyrk | Men's singles |
| Bronze medal – third place | 2004 Hüttau | Men's singles |

Gerald Kallan (born April 29, 1979) is an Austrian luger who has competed since the late 1990s. A natural track luger, he won the two men's singles medals at the FIL World Luge Natural Track Championships with a gold in 2000 and a bronze in 2003.

Kallan earned a pair of bronze medals in the men's singles event at the FIL European Luge Natural Track Championships (1999, 2004).
