= FIL European Luge Natural Track Championships 2004 =

The FIL European Luge Natural Track Championships 2004 took place in Hüttau, Austria.

== Men's singles ==
Medal	Athlete	Time
Gold	Gerhard Pilz (AUT)	
Silver	Andreas Castiglioni (ITA)	
Bronze	Gerald Kallan (AUT)	

== Women's singles ==
Medal	Athlete	Time
Gold	Yekaterina Lavrentyeva (RUS)	
Silver	Christa Gietl (ITA)	
Bronze	Barbara Abart (ITA)	

== Men's doubles ==
Medal	Athlete	Time
Gold	Russia (Pavel Porzhnev, Ivan Lazarev)	
Silver	Russia (Denis Alimov, Roman Molvistov)	
Bronze	Austria (Wolfgang Schopf, Andreas Schopf)	

== Medal table ==
Rank	Nation	Gold	Silver	Bronze	Total
1	Russia (RUS)	2	1	0	3
2	Austria (AUT)	1	0	2	3
3	Italy (ITA)	0	2	1	3
Totals (3 entries)		3	3	3	9
