= Christa Gietl =

Italian luger

Medal record

Natural track luge

Representing Italy

World Championships
| Silver medal – second place | 1998 Rautavaara | Women's singles |

European Championships
| Gold medal – first place | 2006 Umhausen | Women's singles |
| Silver medal – second place | 2004 Hüttau | Women's singles |
| Bronze medal – third place | 1999 Szczyrk | Women's singles |

Christa Gietl (born 16 May 1977) is an Italian luger who has competed since 1994. A natural track luger, she won the silver medal in the women's singles event at the 1998 FIL World Luge Natural Track Championships in Rautavaara, Finland.

Gietl has found better success at the FIL European Luge Natural Track Championships, winning a complete set of medals in the women's singles event (Gold: 2006, Silver: 2004, Bronze: 1999).
