= Herbert Kögl =

Austrian luger (born 1966)

Medal record

Natural track luge

World Championships
Gold medal – first place	1996 Oberperfuss	Men's doubles
Gold medal – first place	2005 Latsch	Mixed team
Silver medal – second place	2000 Olang-Valadora	Men's doubles
Bronze medal – third place	1992 Bad Goisern	Men's doubles
Bronze medal – third place	1998 Rautavaara	Men's doubles
Bronze medal – third place	2007 Grand Prairie	Mixed team

European Championships
Silver medal – second place	2002 Frantschach	Men's doubles
Bronze medal – third place	1997 Passiria	Men's doubles

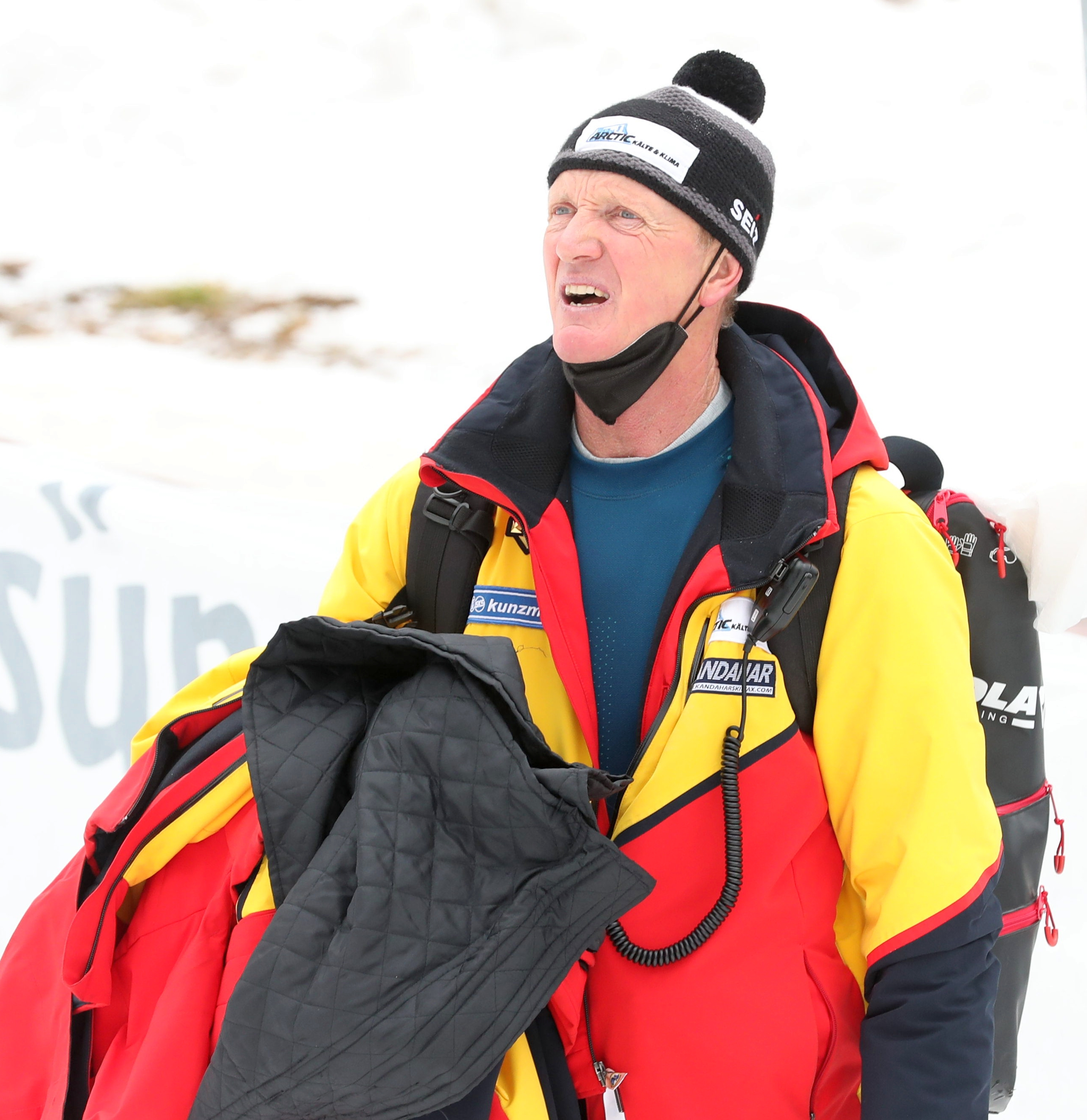
Herbert Kögl at the 2021/22 FIL Luge World Cup in Mariazell, Austria

Herbert Kögl (born 22 March 1966) is an Austrian luger who has competed since 1988. A natural track luger, he won six medals at the FIL World Luge Natural Track Championships with two gold (Men's doubles: 1996, Mixed team: 2005), one silver (2000), and three bronzes (Men's doubles: 1992, 1998; Mixed team: 2007).

Kögl also won two medals in the men's doubles event at the FIL European Luge Natural Track Championships with a silver in 2002 and a bronze in 1997.
