= Andrzej Laszczak =

Polish luger (born 1976)

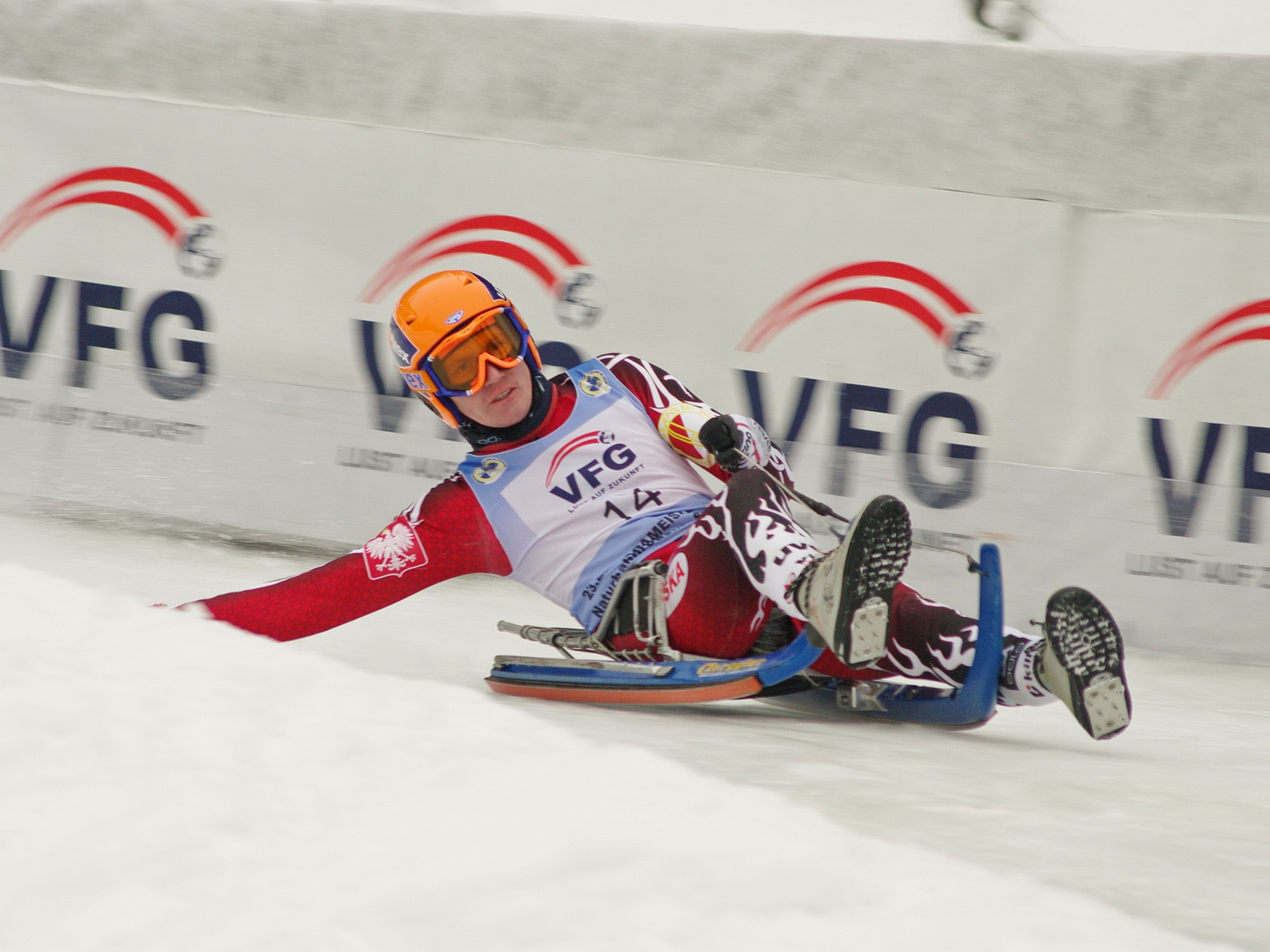

Medal record

Natural track luge

World Championships
Bronze medal – third place	2000 Olang-Valadora	Men's doubles
Bronze medal – third place	2005 Latsch	Men's doubles
Bronze medal – third place	2009 Moos	Men's doubles
Bronze medal – third place	2011 Umhausen	Men's doubles

European Championships
Silver medal – second place	2010 St. Sebastian	Men's doubles
Bronze medal – third place	2002 Frantschach	Men's doubles

Andrzej Laszczak (born 5 May 1976 in Szczyrk) is a Polish luger who has competed since the late 1990s. A natural track luger, he won four bronze medals in the men's doubles event at the FIL World Luge Natural Track Championships (2000, 2005, 2009, 2011).

Laszczak also two medals in the men's doubles event at the FIL European Luge Natural Track Championships with a silver in 2010 and a bronze in 2002.
