= Jury Talykh =

Russian luger (born 1990)

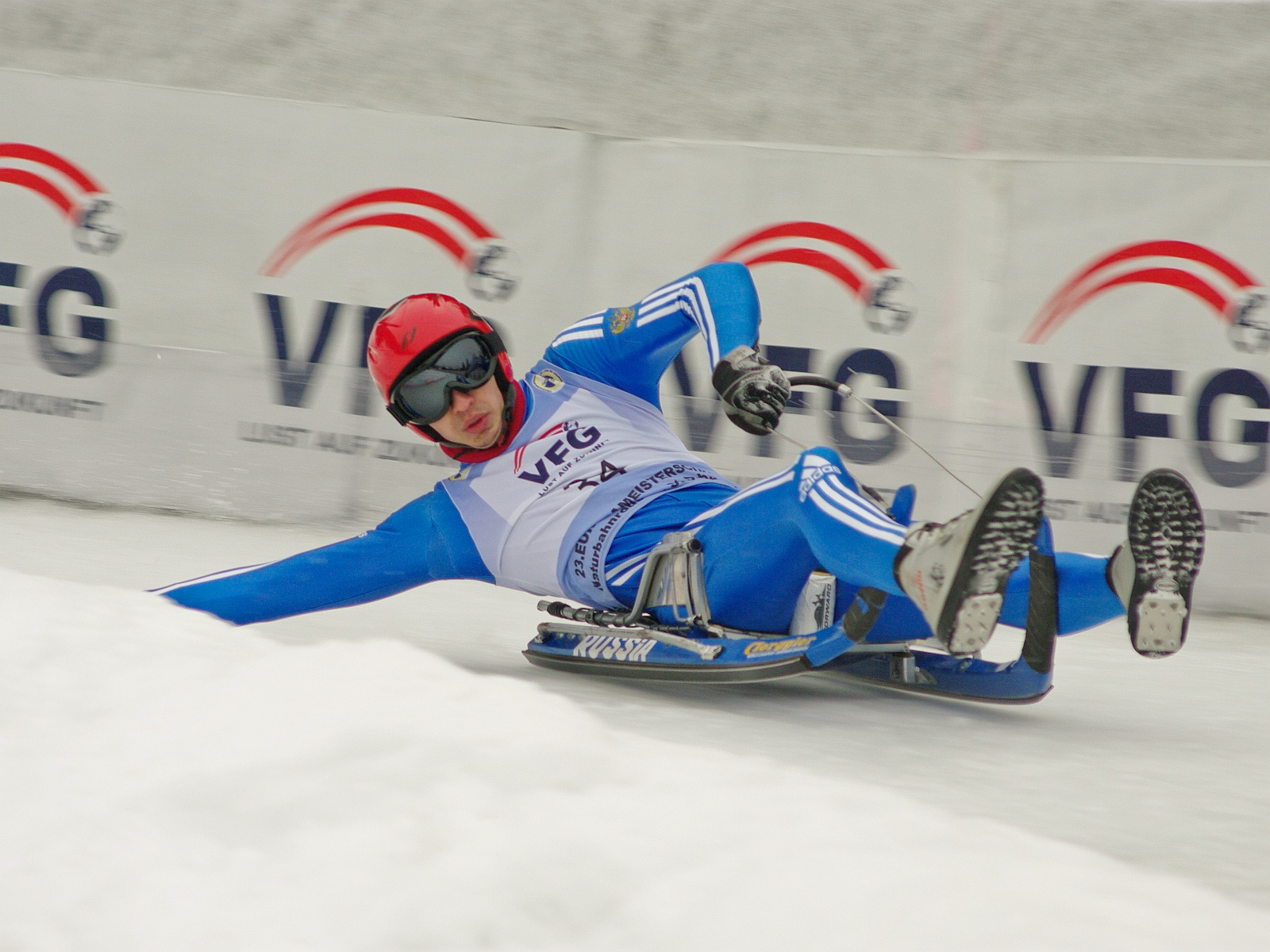

Medal record

Natural track luge

Representing Russia

World Championships
Bronze medal – third place	2011 Umhausen	Mixed team

Jury Talykh (Russian: Ю́рий Та́лых, also transliterated Yuri or Iurii, born 25 August 1990) is a Russian luger who has competed since the 2009. A natural track luger, he won a bronze medal in the mixed team event at the 2011 FIL World Luge Natural Track Championships in Umhausen, Austria.
