= FIL European Luge Natural Track Championships 2002 =

The FIL European Luge Natural Track Championships 2002 took place in Frantschach, Austria.

== Men's singles ==
Medal	Athlete	Time
Gold	Gerhard Pilz (AUT)	
Silver	Robert Batkowski (AUT)	
Bronze	Gernot Schwab (AUT)	

== Women's singles ==
Medal	Athlete	Time
Gold	Sandra Lanthaler (ITA)	
Silver	Yekaterina Lavrentyeva (RUS)	
Bronze	Sonja Steinacher (ITA)	

== Men's doubles ==
Medal	Athlete	Time
Gold	Austria (Wolfgang Schopf, Andreas Schopf)	
Silver	Austria (Reinhard Beer, Herbert Kögl)	
Bronze	Poland (Andrzej Laszczak, Damian Waniczek)	

== Medal table ==
Rank	Nation	Gold	Silver	Bronze	Total
1	Austria (AUT)	2	2	1	5
2	Italy (ITA)	1	0	1	2
3	Russia (RUS)	0	1	0	1
4	Poland (POL)	0	0	1	1
Totals (4 entries)		3	3	3	9
