= Wolfgang Schopf =

Austrian luger (born 1983)

Medal record

Natural track luge

World Championships
Gold medal – first place	2001 Stein an der Enns	Men's doubles
Gold medal – first place	2003 Železniki	Men's doubles

European Championships
Gold medal – first place	2002 Frantschach	Men's doubles
Bronze medal – third place	2004 Hüttau	Men's doubles

Wolfgang Schopf (born 23 June 1983) is an Austrian luger who has competed since 2000. A natural track luger, he won two gold medals in the men's doubles event at the FIL World Luge Natural Track Championships (2001, 2003).

Schopf also won two medals at the FIL European Luge Natural Track Championships with a gold in 2002 and a bronze in 2004.
