= FIL European Luge Natural Track Championships 2010 =

The FIL European Luge Natural Track Championships 2010 was held 15–17 January 2010 in Sankt Sebastian, Austria. A team event debuted at these championships, the first change to the FIL European Luge Natural Track Championships since they began in 1970. Italy earned their 100th medal at these championships.

== Men's singles ==
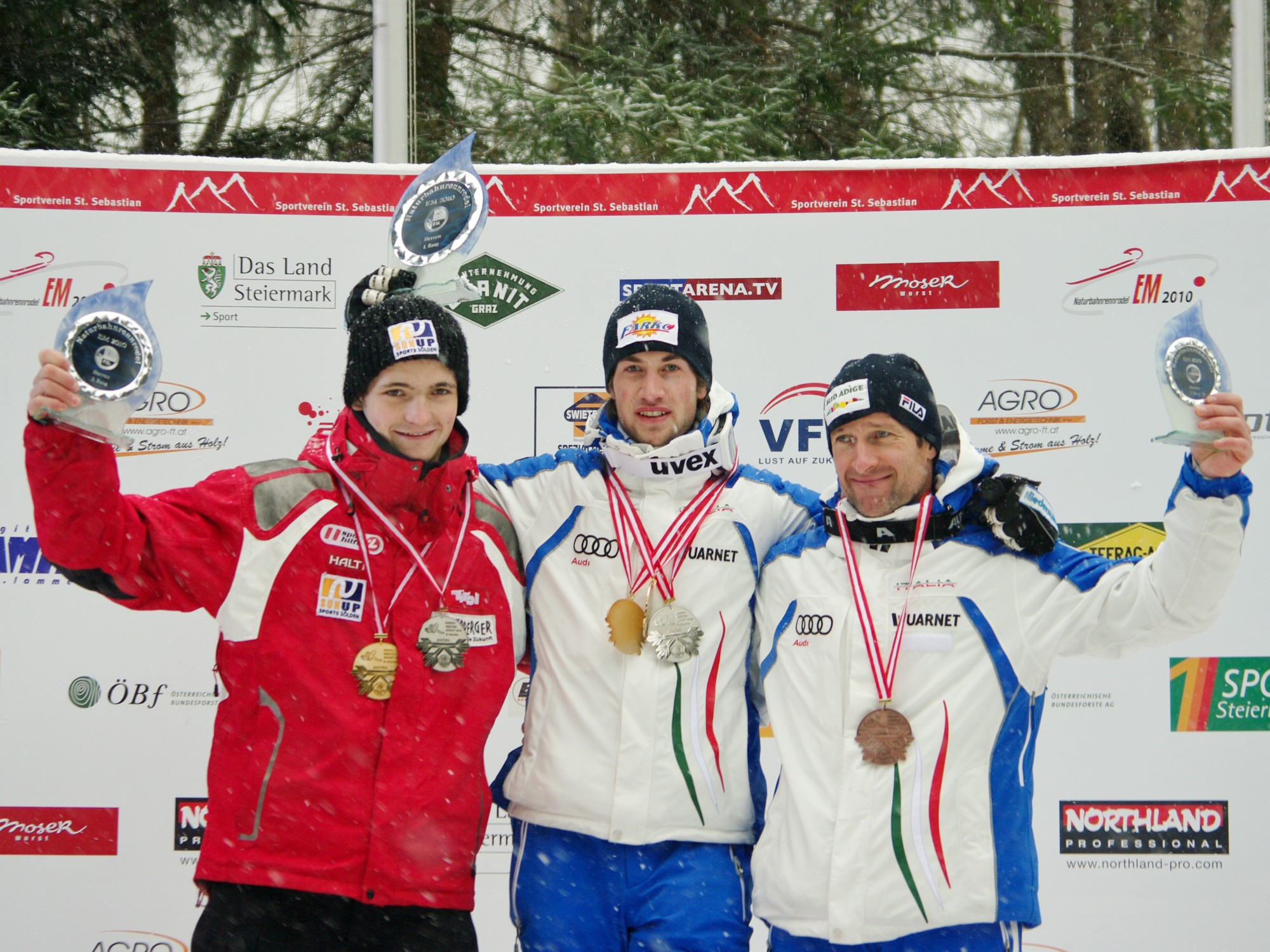
Medalists Kammelander (left), Pigneter (center), and Blasbichler (right).

16 January 2010 following women's run 2. 17 January 2010 at 09:30 CET (run 2) and 12:00 CET. Pigneter won his first gold medal in this event after two straight bronzes. He also won his second gold and third medal at these championships with the fastest time in all three runs.

Medal	Athlete	Time
Gold	Patrick Pigneter (ITA)	3:32.24
Silver	Thomas Kammerlander (AUT)	3:33.24
Bronze	Anton Blasbichler (ITA)	3:33.93

== Women's singles ==
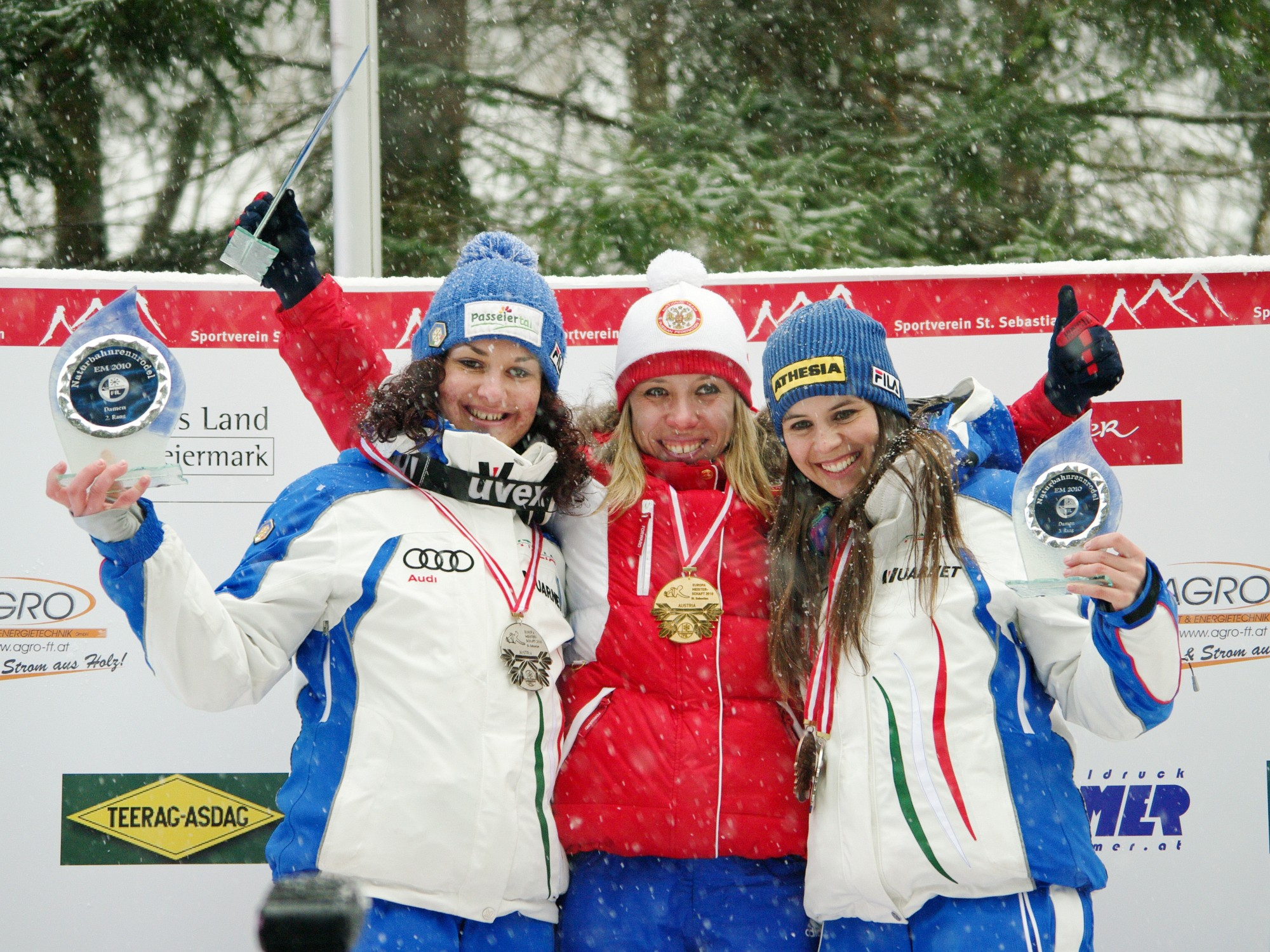
Lanthaler (left), Lavrentyeva (center), and Gietl (right).

16 January 2010 following doubles run 1. Run 2 at 12:00 CET same day. 17 January 2010 at 11:00 CET. Gietl led after the first run while Lanthaler had the fastest second and third runs, but it was not enough to catch Lavrentyeva, who won her second straight championships and third overall. Lanthaler earned her first medal in the championships while Gietl won her third straight bronze.

Medal	Athlete	Time
Gold	Yekaterina Lavrentyeva (RUS)	3:38.76
Silver	Evelin Lanthaler (ITA)	3:38.84
Bronze	Renate Gietl (ITA)	3:39.08

== Men's doubles ==
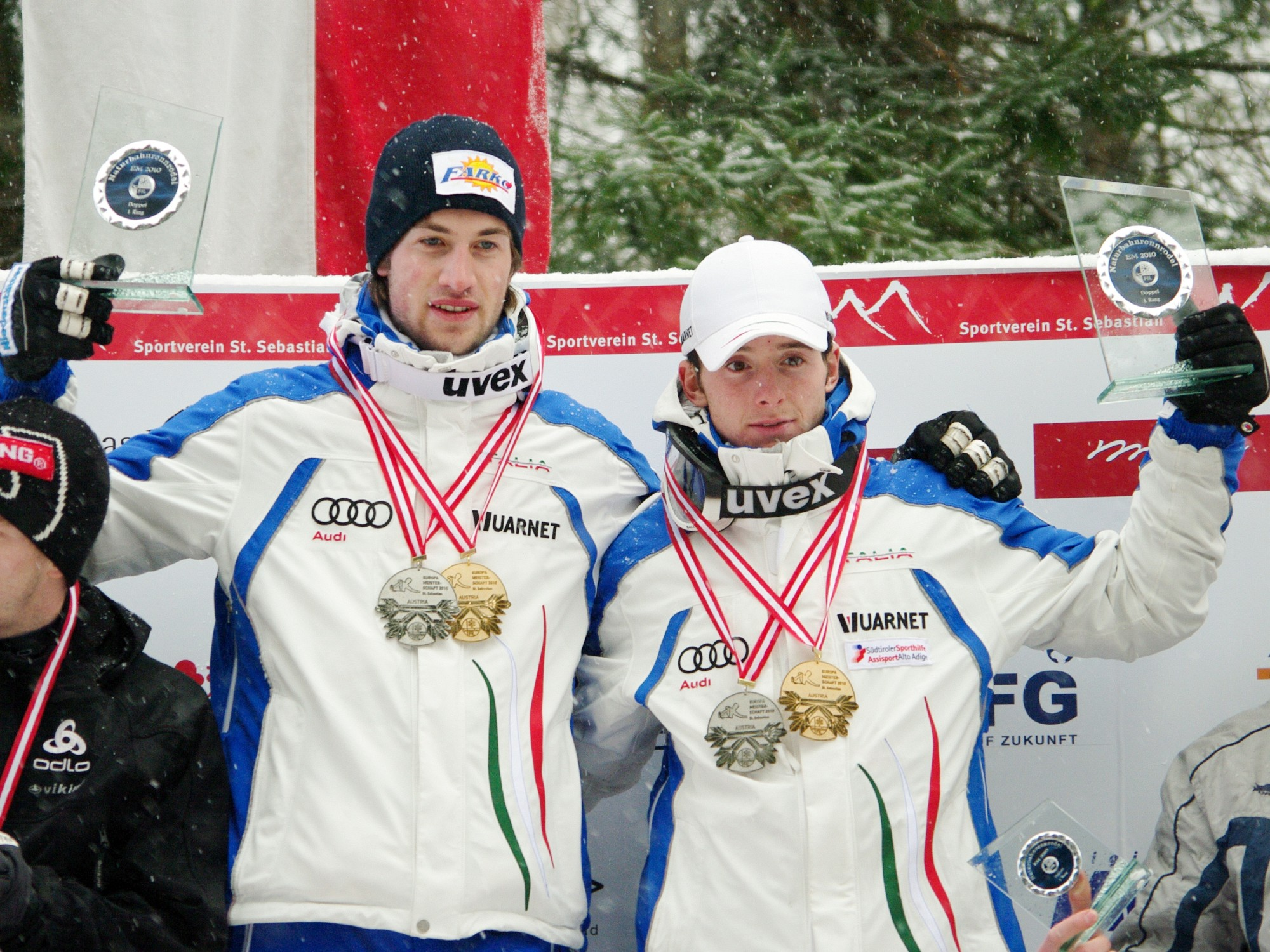
Gold medalists Pigenter (left) and Clara (right).

First run on 16 January 2010 at 09:30 CET. Second run on 11:30 CET same day. Pigneter and Clara won their first European title by having the fastest times in both runs. Three-time defending World Champions Pavel Porzhnev and Ivan Lazarev of Russia finished sixth.

Medal	Athlete	Time
Gold	Italy (Patrick Pigneter, Florian Clara)	2:30.77
Silver	Poland (Andrzej Laszczak, Damian Waniczek)	2:32.29
Bronze	Russia (Aleksandr Yegorov, Pyotr Popov)	2:32.58

== Mixed team ==
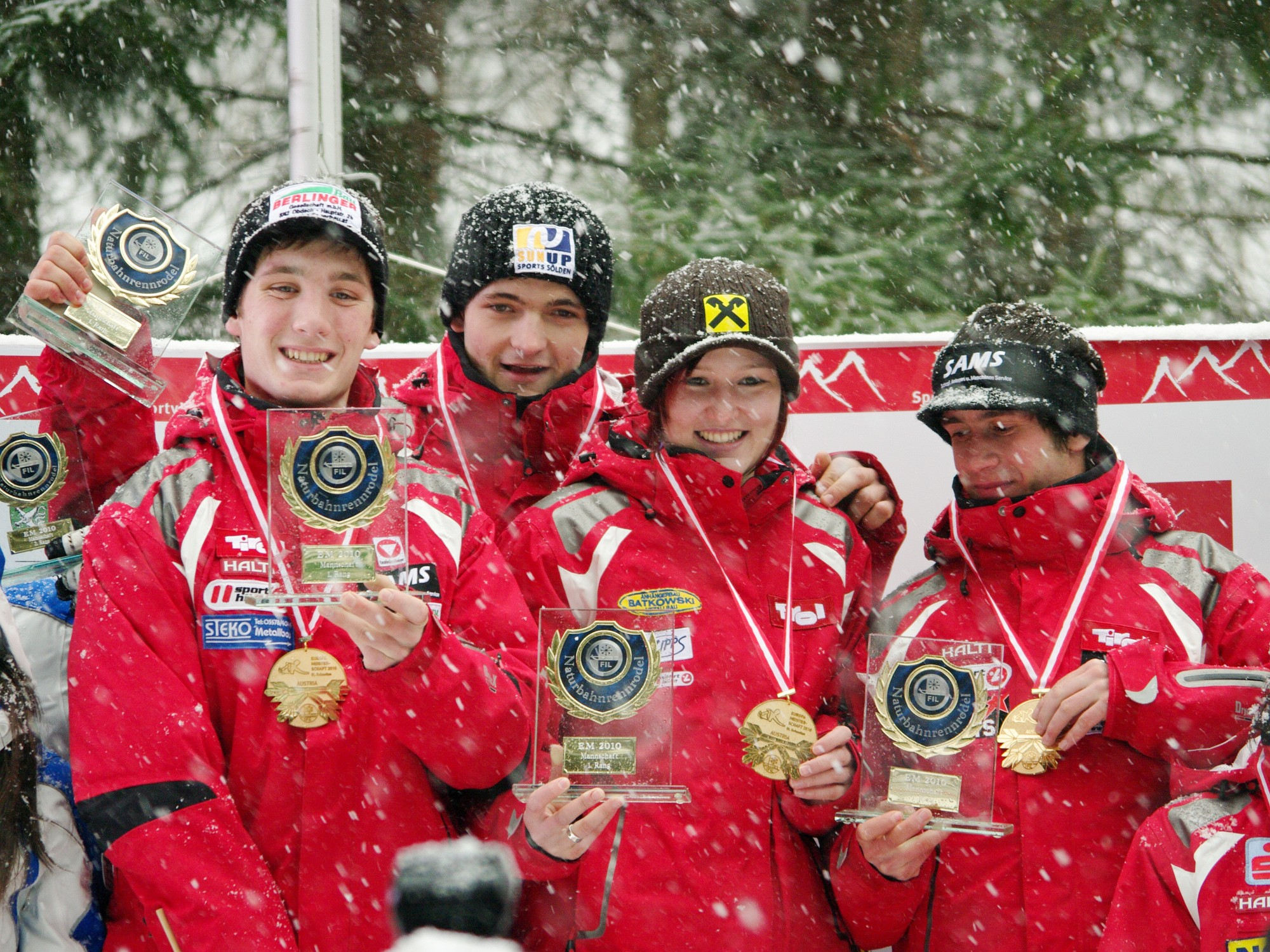
(Left to right) The winning team of Christian Schopf, Thomas Kammerlander, Melanie Batkowski, and Andreas Schopf.

15 January 2010 at 18:30 CET. Points were awarded rather than by time.

Medal	Athlete	Points
Gold	Austria (Melanie Batkowski, Thomas Kammerlander, Christian Schopf, Andreas Schopf)	86
Silver	Italy (Renate Gietl, Alex Gruber, Patrick Pigneter, Florian Clara)	85
Bronze	Austria (Marlies Wagner, Gerald Kammerlander, Christian Schatz, Gerhard Mühlbacher)	80

== Medal table ==
Rank	Nation	Gold	Silver	Bronze	Total
1	Italy (ITA)	2	2	2	6
2	Austria (AUT)	1	1	1	3
3	Russia (RUS)	1	0	1	2
4	Poland (POL)	0	1	0	1
Totals (4 entries)		4	4	4	12
