= Barbara Abart =

Italian luger (born 1985)

Medal record

Natural track luge

Representing Italy

World Championships
Silver medal – second place	2005 Latsch	Women's singles

European Championships
Bronze medal – third place	2004 Hüttau	Women's singles

Barbara Abart (born 18 August 1985, in Schlanders, Italy) is an Italian luger who has competed since 2001. A natural track luger, she won the silver medal in the women's singles event at the 2005 FIL World Luge Natural Track Championships in Latsch, Italy.

Abart also won the bronze medal in the women's singles event at the 2004 FIL European Luge Natural Track Championships in Hüttau, Austria.
