= Lyubov Panyutina =

Medal record

Natural track luge

World Championships

Representing Soviet Union
Bronze medal – third place	1990 Gsies	Women's singles

Representing CIS
Gold medal – first place	1992 Bad Goisern	Women's singles

Representing Russia
Gold medal – first place	1998 Rautavaara	Women's singles

European Championships

Representing Russia
Silver medal – second place	1995 Kandalaksha	Women's singles
Gold medal – first place	1997 Passiria	Women's singles

Lyubov Panyutina (born 26 July 1970) was a Soviet-Russian luger who competed from the mid-1980s to the early 2000s. A natural track luger, she won the three medals in the women's singles event at the FIL World Luge Natural Track Championships with a two golds (1992 - Commonwealth of Independent States, 1998 - Russia) and a bronze (1990 - Soviet Union) competing for three countries.

Panyutina also won two medals at the FIL European Luge Natural Track Championships with a gold in 1997 and a silver in 1995.
