= Andreas Castiglioni =

Italian luger (born 1980)

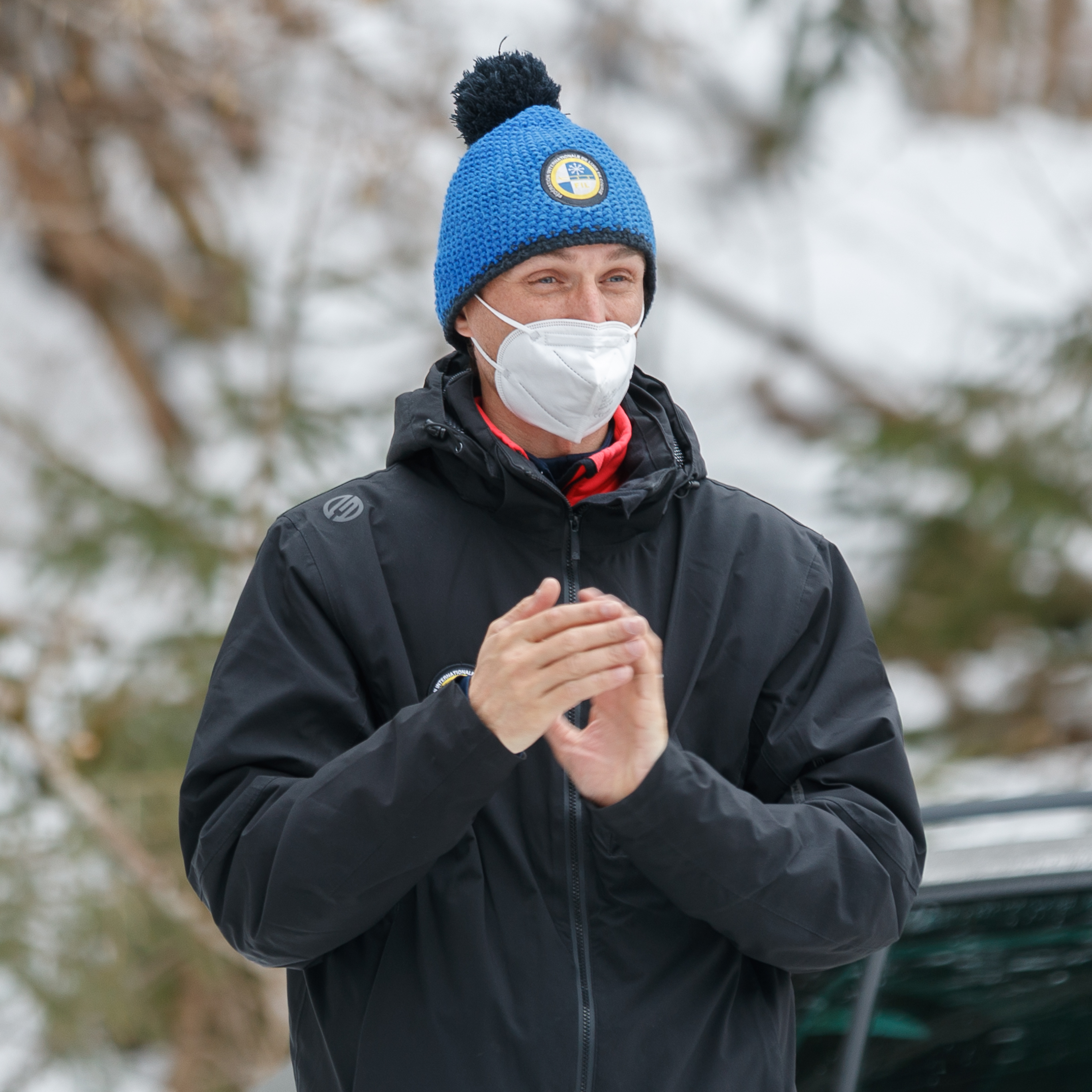
- Castiglioni in 2022

Medal record

Natural track luge

Representing Italy

World Championships
Silver medal – second place	2005 Latsch	Men's singles

European Championships
Silver medal – second place	2004 Hüttau	Men's singles

Andreas Castiglioni (born 2 May 1980) is an Italian luger who has competed since 1998. A natural track luger, he won the silver medal in the men's singles event at the 2005 FIL World Luge Natural Track Championships in Latsch, Italy.

Castiglioni also earned a silver in the men's singles event at the 2004 FIL European Natural Luge Natural Track Championships in Hüttau, Austria.
