= Franz Obrist =

Italian luger

Medal record

Natural track luge

World Championships
Silver medal – second place	1994 Gsies	Men's singles
Bronze medal – third place	1992 Bad Goisern	Men's singles
Bronze medal – third place	1996 Oberperfuss	Men's singles

European Championships
Gold medal – first place	1991 Fié allo Sciliar	Men's singles
Bronze medal – third place	1993 Stein an der Enns	Men's singles

Franz Obrist was an Italian luger who competed from the mid–1980s to the early 1990s. A natural track luger, he won three singles medals at the FIL World Luge Natural Track Championships with one silver in 1994 and two bronzes in 1992 and 1996.

Obrist won two men's singles medals at the FIL European Luge Natural Track Championships with a gold in 1991 and a bronze in 1993.
