= Irene Mitterstieler =

Italian luger

Medal record

Natural track luge

Representing Italy

World Championships
Bronze medal – third place	2003 Železniki	Women's singles

Irene Mitterstieler (born August 6, 1974) was an Italian luger who competed from the late 1990s to 2005. A natural track luger, she won the bronze medal at the 2003 FIL World Luge Natural Track Championships in Železniki, Slovenia
