= Johannes Hofer =

Italian luger (born 1983)

Medal record

Natural track luge

World Championships
| Silver medal – second place | 2005 Latsch | Men's doubles |
| Bronze medal – third place | 2005 Latsch | Mixed team |

Johannes Hofer (born 3 August 1983) is an Italian luger who has competed since 2002. A natural track luger, he won two medals at the 2005 FIL World Luge Natural Track Championships in Latsch, Italy with a silver in the men's doubles and a bronze in the mixed team events.
