= Thomas Kammerlander =

Austrian luger (born 1990)

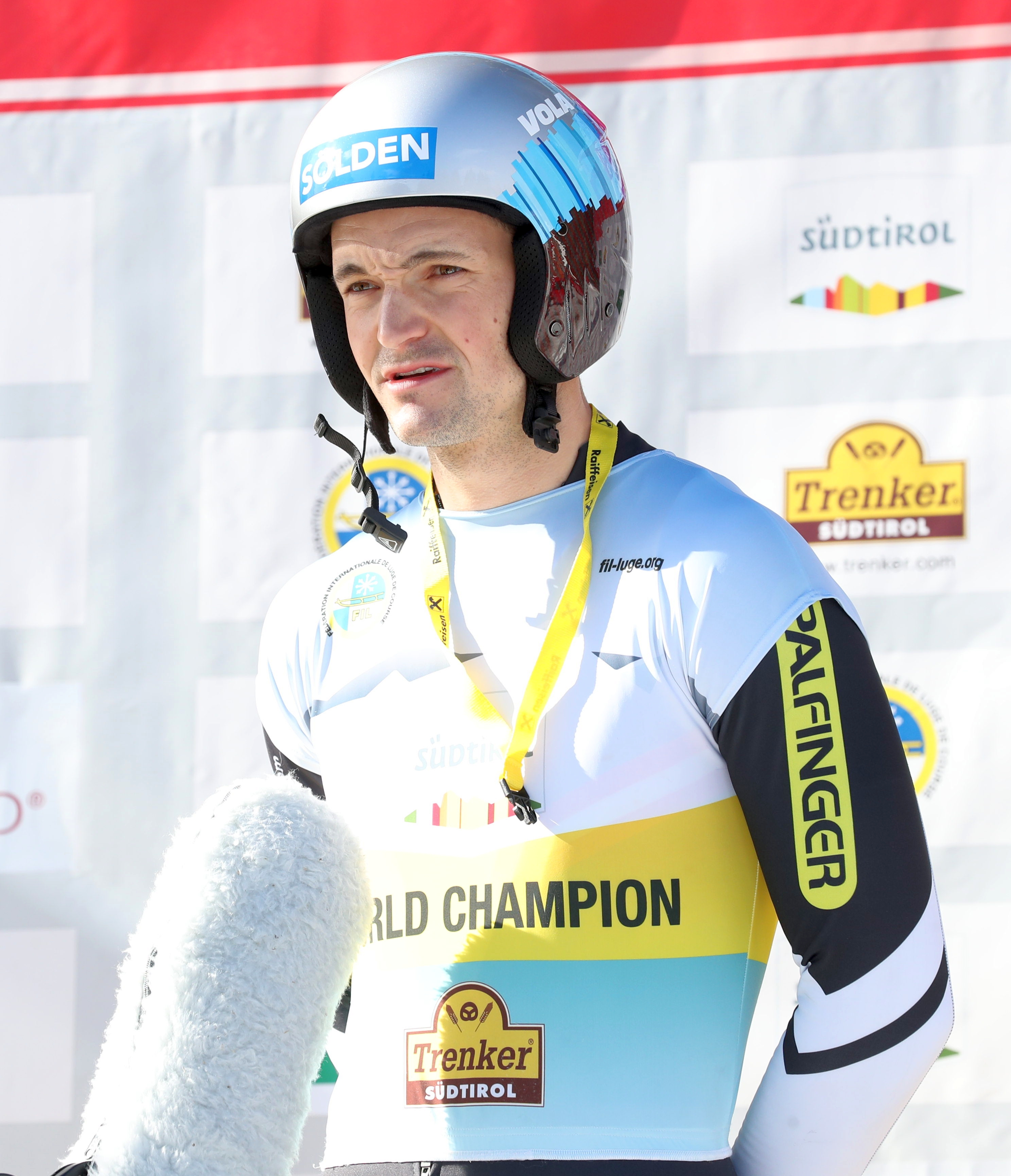
- Kammerlander in 2022

Personal information
- Born: 13 February 1990 (age 36)
Medal record
Men's natural track luge
Representing Austria
World Championships
Gold medal – first place	2017 Vatra Dornei	Mixed team
Gold medal – first place	2021 Umhausen	Singles
Silver medal – second place	2009 Moos	Singles
Silver medal – second place	2019 Latzfons	Singles
Silver medal – second place	2019 Latzfons	Mixed team
Silver medal – second place	2021 Umhausen	Mixed team
Bronze medal – third place	2017 Vatra Dornei	Singles
Bronze medal – third place	2023 Deutschnofen	Singles
European Championships
Gold medal – first place	2010 St. Sebastian	Mixed team
Silver medal – second place	2010 St. Sebastian	Singles

Thomas Kammerlander (born 13 February 1990) is an Austrian luger who has competed since 2006. A natural track luger, he is a two-time World Champion.

== Career ==
e won a silver medal in the men's singles event at the 2009 FIL World Luge Natural Track Championships in Moos, Italy. He also won two medals at the FIL European Luge Championships 2010 in St. Sebastian, Austria with a gold in the mixed team and a silver in the men's singles events.
