= FIL World Luge Natural Track Championships 1990 =

The FIL World Luge Natural Track Championships 1990 took place in Gsies, Italy.

== Men's singles ==
Medal	Athlete	Time
Gold	Gerhard Pilz (AUT)	
Silver	Corrado Herin (ITA)	
Bronze	Harald Steinhauser (ITA)	

== Women's singles ==
Medal	Athlete	Time
Gold	Jeanette Koppensteiner (AUT)	
Silver	Irene Koch (AUT)	
Bronze	Lyubov Panyutina (URS)	

Panyutina becomes the first person not from Austria or Italy to medal at the championships.

== Men's doubles ==
Medal	Athlete	Time
Gold	Italy (Andreas Jud, Hannes Pichler)	
Silver	Italy (Almir Bentemps, Corrado Herin)	
Bronze	Austria (Walter Mauracher, Georg Eberhardter)	

== Medal table ==
Rank	Nation	Gold	Silver	Bronze	Total
1	Austria (AUT)	2	1	1	4
2	Italy (ITA)	1	2	1	4
3	Soviet Union (URS)	0	0	1	1
Totals (3 entries)		3	3	3	9
