= FIL World Luge Natural Track Championships 1986 =

The FIL World Luge Natural Track Championships 1986 took place in Fénis, Italy.

== Men's singles ==
Medal	Athlete	Time
Gold	Gerhard Pilz (AUT)	
Silver	Damiano Lugon (ITA)	
Bronze	Harald Steinhauser (ITA)	

== Women's singles ==
Medal	Athlete	Time
Gold	Irmgard Lanthaler (ITA)	
Silver	Delia Vaudan (ITA)	
Bronze	Helga Pichler (ITA)	

== Men's doubles ==
Medal	Athlete	Time
Gold	Italy (Almir Bétemps, Corrado Hérin)	
Silver	Italy (Andreas Jud, Ernst Oberhammer)	
Bronze	Italy (Arnold Lunger, Gunther Steinhauser)	

== Medal table ==
Rank	Nation	Gold	Silver	Bronze	Total
1	Italy (ITA)	2	3	3	8
2	Austria (AUT)	1	0	0	1
Totals (2 entries)		3	3	3	9
