= Helga Pichler =

Italian luger

Medal record

Natural track luge

World Championships
| Bronze medal – third place | 1986 Fénis-Aosta | Women's singles |

European Championships
| Silver medal – second place | 1987 Jesenice | Women's singles |

Helga Pichler was an Italian luger who competed in the mid-1980s. A natural track luger, she won the bronze medal in the women's singles event at the 1986 FIL World Luge Natural Track Championships in Fénis-Aosta, Italy.

Pichler also earned a silver medal in the women's singles event at the 1987 FIL European Luge Natural Track Championships in Jesenice, Yugoslavia.
