= Arnold Lunger =

Italian luger

Medal record

Natural track luge

World Championships
| Bronze medal – third place | 1986 Fénis-Aosta | Men's doubles |

Arnold Lunger was an Italian luger who competed in the mid-1980s. A natural track luger, he won a bronze medal in the men's doubles event at the 1986 FIL Luge Natural Track Championships in Fénis-Aosta, Italy.
