= Martin Gruber (luger) =

Italian luger (born 1975)

Medal record

Natural track luge

Representing Italy

World Championships
Silver medal – second place	1998 Rautavaara	Men's singles

European Championships
Silver medal – second place	1995 Kandalaksha	Men's singles

Martin Gruber (born 11 November 1975 in Brixen) is an Italian luger who has competed since 1992. A natural track luger, he won the men's singles silver medal at the 1998 FIL World Luge Natural Track Championships in Rautavaara, Finland.

Gruber also won a silver medal in the same event at the 1995 FIL European Luge Natural Track Championships in Kandalaksha, Russia.
