= Georg Eberhardter =

Austrian luger

Medal record

Natural track luge

World Championships
| Bronze medal – third place | 1990 Gsies | Men's doubles |

European Championships
| Bronze medal – third place | 1991 Völs am Schlern | Men's doubles |

Georg Eberhardter was an Austrian luger who competed from the late 1980s to the early 1990s. A natural track luger, he won the bronze medal in the men's doubles event at the 1990 FIL World Luge Natural Track Championships in Gsies, Italy.

Eberhardter also won a bronze medal in the men's doubles event at the 1991 FIL European Luge Natural Track Championships in Völs am Schlern, Italy.
