= Walter Mauracher =

Austrian luger

Medal record

Natural track luge

World Championships
Bronze medal – third place	1990 Gsies	Men's doubles

European Championships
Bronze medal – third place	1991 Völs am Schlern	Men's doubles

Walter Mauracher was an Austrian luger who competed from the late 1980s to the early 1990s. A natural track luger, he won the bronze medal in the men's doubles event at the 1990 FIL World Luge Natural Track Championships in Gsies, Italy.

Mauracher also won a bronze medal in the men's doubles event at the 1991 FIL European Luge Natural Track Championships in Völs am Schlern, Italy.
