= FIL World Luge Natural Track Championships 2009 =

The FIL World Luge Natural Track Championships 2009 took place 12–15 February 2009 in Moos, Italy. This was the second time the city hosted the event having done so in 1980.

== Event preparations ==
Preparations for the track were inspected by World Cup champion Patrick Pigneter and local hero Evelyn Lanthaler. Infrastructure improvements at the finish area were improved, including enlargement of the parking lot. Both athletes were impressed with the venue itself even without it being iced.

== Men's singles ==
14 February 2009 at 13:00 hours Central European Time (CET), then 15 February at 09:30 CET & 11:00 CET.

Medal	Athlete	Time
Gold	Patrick Pigneter (ITA)	2:45.95
Silver	Thomas Kammerlander (AUT)	2:45.99
Bronze	Thomas Schopf (AUT)	2:46.59

Pigneter won his third gold at these championships.

== Women's singles ==
February 14, 2009 at 10:30 CET & 12:00 CET, then February 15 at 12:00 CET.

Medal	Athlete	Time
Gold	Renate Gietl (ITA)	2:50.09
Silver	Yekaterina Lavrentyeva (RUS)	2:50.12
Bronze	Renate Kasslatter (ITA)	2:50.51

Gietl had the fastest times in the first two runs to upset two-time defending world champion Lavrentyeva.

== Men's doubles ==
February 14, 2009 at 09:30 CET & 11:30 CET.

Medal	Athlete	Time
Gold	Italy (Patrick Pigneter & Florian Clara)	1:57.26
Silver	Austria (Christian Schopf & Andreas Schopf)	1:58.05
Bronze	Poland (Andrzej Laszczak & Damian Waniczek)	1:59.34

Pigneter and Clara won their second gold of the championships while Schopf and Schopf won their second silver. Patrick's father Raimund won world championship gold on the same track in 1980.

== Mixed team ==
February 13, 2009 at 10:00 CET.

Medal	Athlete	Time
Gold	Italy (Renate Gietl, Anton Blasbichler, Patrick Pigneter, Florian Clara)	
Silver	Austria (Melanie Batkowski, Thomas Schopf, Christian Schopf, Andreas Schopf)	
Bronze	Russia (Yekaterina Lavrentyeva, Pavel Porzhnev, Ivan Lazarev)	

Lazarev competed both in the singles and doubles in the event for Russia.

== Medal table ==
Rank	Nation	Gold	Silver	Bronze	Total
1	Italy (ITA)	4	0	1	5
2	Austria (AUT)	0	3	1	4
3	Russia (RUS)	0	1	1	2
4	Poland (POL)	0	0	1	1
Totals (4 entries)		4	4	4	12

== Notes and references ==
- 17.FIL World Championships in Moos, Season's Highlight. at the Fédération Internationale de Luge de Course (21 May 2008 article accessed 21 May 2008.)
- Men's doubles natural track World Champions
- Men's singles natural track World Champions
- Mixed teams natural track World Champions
- Women's singles natural track World Champions
