= Sandra Mariner =

Austrian luger

Medal record

Natural track luge

Representing Austria

World Championships
Bronze medal – third place	1996 Oberperfuss	Women's singles
Bronze medal – third place	2001 Stein an der Enns	Women's singles

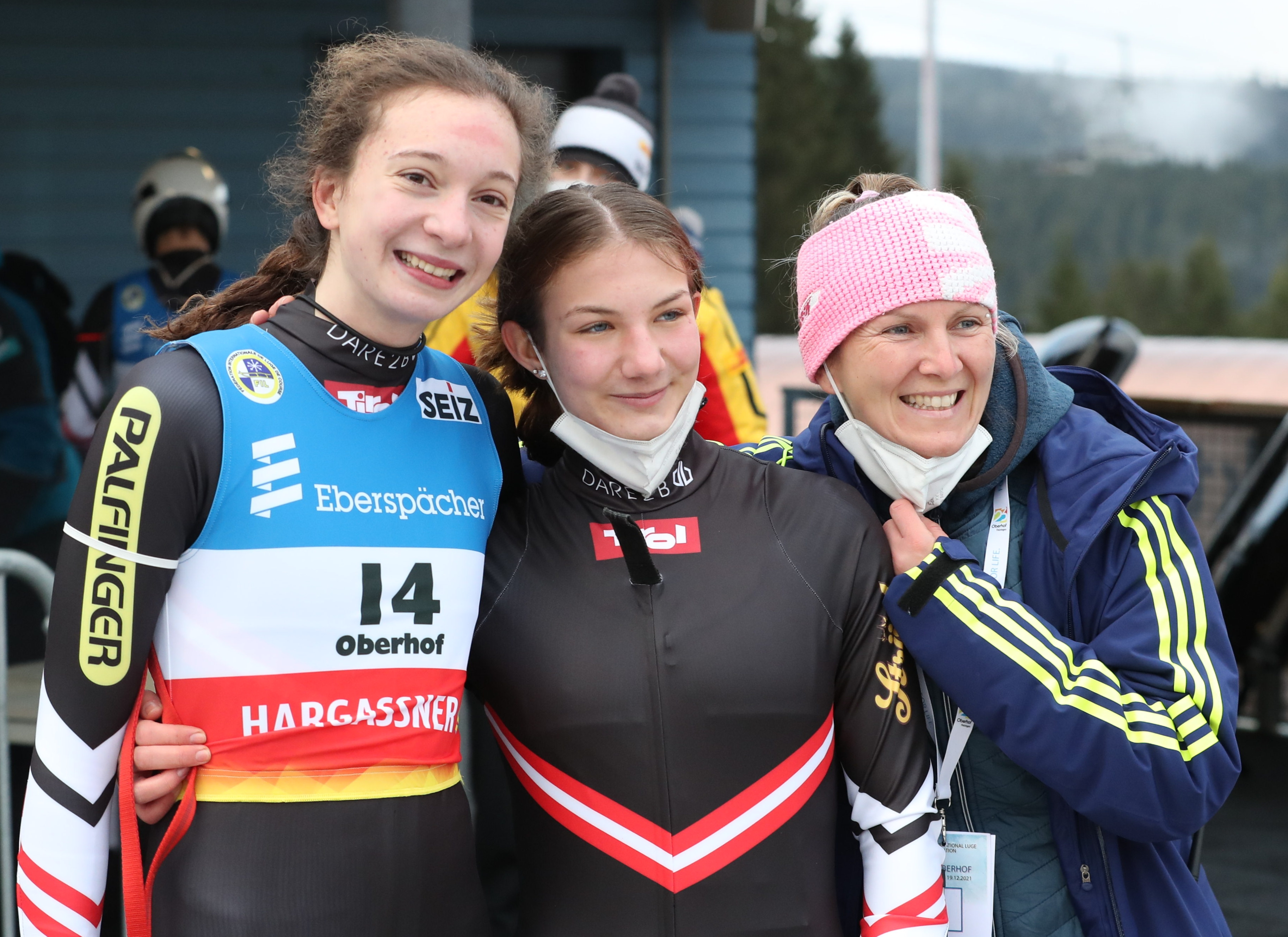

Sandra Mariner (born 13 May 1974) is an Austrian luger who has competed since 1986. A natural track luger, she won two bronze medals in the women's singles event in 1996 and 2001.
