= Hannes Pichler =

Italian luger

Medal record

Natural track luge

World Championships
Gold medal – first place	1990 Gsies	Men's doubles

Hannes Pichler was an Italian luger who competed from the mid-1980s to the early 1990s. A natural track luger, he won the gold medal in the men's doubles event at the 1990 FIL World Luge Natural Track Championships in Gsies, Italy.
