= FIL World Luge Natural Track Championships 2011 =

Coordinates: 47°07′09″N 10°55′47″E

The FIL World Luge Natural Track Championships 2011 took place 26–30 January in Umhausen, Austria.

== Men's singles ==
Run 1 took place after the second run of the women's single event after 18:30 CET on 29 January. For 30 January, run 2 took place at 10:30 CET while the third and final run took place after the third and final run of the women's single event after 12:30 CET.

Medal	Athlete	Time
Gold	Gerald Kammerlander (AUT)	3:37.61
Silver	Robert Batkowski (AUT)	3:37.65
Bronze	Patrick Pigneter (ITA)	3:37.95

== Women's singles ==
Run 1 took place after the first run of the men's doubles' event at 10:30 CET on 29 January while run 2 took place on 18:30 CET that same day. The third and final run took place at 12:30 CET the following day.

Medal	Athlete	Time
Gold	Renate Gietl (ITA)	3:40.43
Silver	Yekaterina Lavrentyeva (RUS)	3:40.67
Bronze	Melanie Schwarz (ITA)	3:43.31

== Men's doubles ==
Both runs took place on 29 January.

Medal	Athlete	Time
Gold	Russia (Pavel Porzhnev, Ivan Lazarev)	2:33.24
Silver	Italy (Patrick Pigneter, Florian Clara)	2:33.90
Bronze	Poland (Andrzej Laszczak, Damian Waniczek)	2:35.26

== Mixed team ==
This event took place on 28 January.

Medal	Athlete	Points
Gold	Italy (Anton Blasbichler, Renate Gietl, Patrick Pigneter, Florian Clara)	79
Silver	Austria (Gerald Kammerlander, Melanie Batkowski, Christian Schatz, Gerhard Mühlbacher)	72
Bronze	Russia (Juri Talykh, Yekaterina Lavrentyeva, Pavel Porzhnev, Ivan Lazarev)	71

== Medal table ==
Rank	Nation	Gold	Silver	Bronze	Total
1	Italy (ITA)	2	1	2	5
2	Austria (AUT)	1	2	0	3
3	Russia (RUS)	1	1	1	3
4	Poland (POL)	0	0	1	1
Totals (4 entries)		4	4	4	12

== Notes and references ==
- FIL 2010-11 Natural Track World Cup Schedule. - accessed 25 July 2010.
- Official website (in German)
- Men's doubles natural track World Champions
- Men's singles natural track World Champions
- Mixed teams natural track World Champions
- Women's singles natural track World Champions
