= FIL World Luge Natural Track Championships 2000 =

The FIL World Luge Natural Track Championships 2000 took place in Olang-Valdaora, Italy.

== Men's singles ==
Medal	Athlete	Time
Gold	Gerald Kallan (AUT)	
Silver	Gerhard Pilz (AUT)	
Bronze	Anton Blasbichler (ITA)	

== Women's singles ==
Medal	Athlete	Time
Gold	Yekaterina Lavrentyeva (RUS)	
Silver	Sonja Steinacher (ITA)	
Bronze	Elvira Holzknecht (AUT)	

== Men's doubles ==
Medal	Athlete	Time
Gold	Italy (Armin Mair, David Mair)	
Silver	Austria (Reinhard Beer, Herbert Kögl)	
Bronze	Poland (Andrzej Laszczak, Damian Waniczek)	

The Polish doubles team of Laszczak and Waniczek are the first non-Austrian or Italian team to medal in this event at the World Championships.

== Medal table ==
Rank	Nation	Gold	Silver	Bronze	Total
1	Austria (AUT)	1	2	1	4
2	Italy (ITA)	1	1	1	3
3	Russia (RUS)	1	0	0	1
4	Poland (POL)	0	0	1	1
Totals (4 entries)		3	3	3	9
