= FIL World Luge Natural Track Championships 2005 =

The FIL World Luge Natural Track Championships 2005 took place in Latsch, Italy.

== Men's singles ==
Medal	Athlete	Time
Gold	Robert Batkowski (ITA)	
Silver	Andreas Castiglioni (ITA)	
Bronze	Patrick Pigneter (ITA)	

== Women's singles ==
Medal	Athlete	Time
Gold	Yekaterina Lavrentyeva (RUS)	
Silver	Barbara Abart (ITA)	
Bronze	Renate Gietl (ITA)	

== Men's doubles ==
Medal	Athlete	Time
Gold	Russia (Pavel Porzhnev, Ivan Lazarev)	
Silver	Italy (Armin Mair, Johannes Hofer)	
Bronze	Poland (Andrzej Laszczak, Damian Waniczek)	

== Mixed team ==
Medal	Athlete	Time
Gold	Austria (Melanie Batkowski, Robert Batkowski, Reinhard Beer, Herbert Kögl)	
Silver	Russia (Yekaterina Lavrentyeva, Aleksey Lebedev, Pavel Porzhnev, Ivan Lazarev)	
Bronze	Italy (Renate Gietl, Anton Blasbichler, Armin Mair, Johannes Hofer)	

== Medal table ==
Rank	Nation	Gold	Silver	Bronze	Total
1	Russia (RUS)	2	1	0	3
2	Italy (ITA)	1	3	3	7
3	Austria (AUT)	1	0	0	1
4	Poland (POL)	0	0	1	1
Totals (4 entries)		4	4	4	12
