= Corrado Hérin =

Italian luger and mountain biker (1966–2019)

Personal information
- Full name: Corrado Hérin
- Nickname: Turbo
- Born: 4 August 1966 Pollein, Italy
- Died: 31 March 2019 (aged 52) Torgnon, Italy

Cycling career
- Sport: Cycling
- Disciplines: Mountain bike and luge
Medal record
Representing Italy
Men's natural track luge
World Championships
| Gold medal – first place | 1986 Fénis-Aosta | Men's doubles |
| Gold medal – first place | 1992 Bad Goisern | Men's doubles |
| Silver medal – second place | 1990 Gsies | Men's singles |
| Silver medal – second place | 1990 Gsies | Men's doubles |
European Championships
| Gold medal – first place | 1993 Stein an der Enns | Men's doubles |
| Silver medal – second place | 1985 Szczyrk | Men's doubles |
| Silver medal – second place | 1987 Jesenice | Men's doubles |
Men's mountain bike racing
World Championships
| Bronze medal – third place | 1994 Vail | Downhill |
| Gold medal – first place | 2016 Val Di Sole | Downhill Masters 50+ |

Corrado Hérin (French pronunciation: [eʁɛ̃]; 4 August 1966 – 31 March 2019) was an Italian luger and mountain bike racer. He died on 31 March 2019 in an ultralight flight accident in Torgnon, Italy.

== Biography ==
Originally from Fénis, Aosta Valley, he competed from the mid-1980s to the early 1990s. A natural track luger, he won four medals at the FIL World Luge Natural Track Championships with two gold in the doubles (1986, 1992) and two silvers at the 1990 event (singles, doubles).

Hérin also won three medals in the men's doubles event at the FIL European Luge Natural Track Championships with one gold (1993) and two silvers (1985, 1987).

Hérin was involved with mountain biking during his career in luge during the 1990s, winning a bronze medal in the downhill event at the 1994 World Mountain Biking Championships in Vail, Colorado. He remained active in mountain biking from 1997 to 2002 after retiring from luge.

He won the UCI mountain bike Downhill World cup in 1997 racing for the Sintesi Verlicchi team. In 2016 he returned to racing at the age of 50 and won the Mountain Bike Downhill Masters World Championships in Val Di Sole, Italy.

== Sources ==
- Natural track European Championships results 1970–2006.
- Natural track World Championships results: 1979–2007
