= Patrick Pigneter =

Italian luger (born 1987)

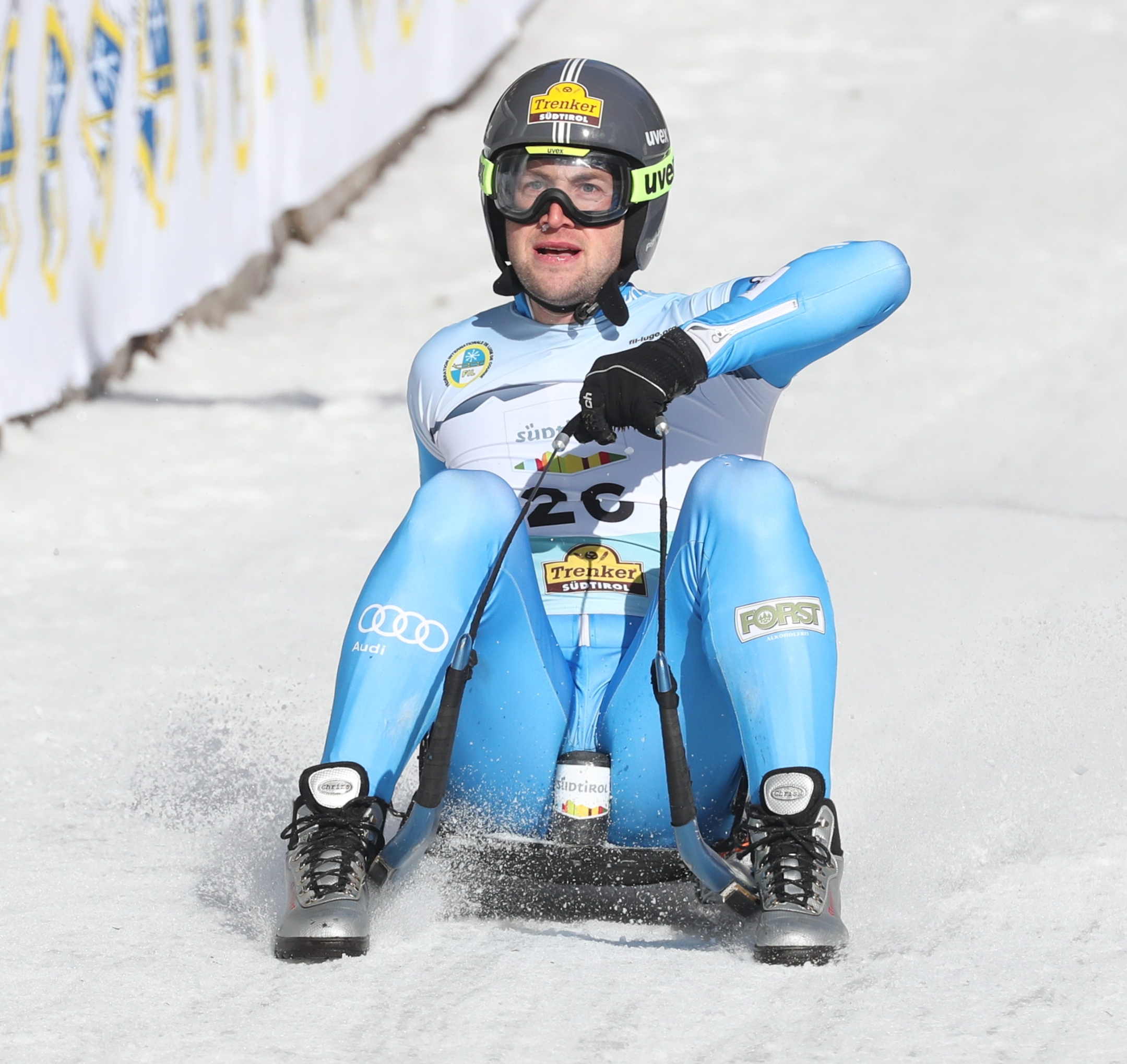
- Pigneter in 2022

Personal information
- Born: 19 July 1987 (age 38)
Medal record
Natural track luge
Representing Italy
World Championships
Gold medal – first place	2009 Moos	Men's singles
Gold medal – first place	2009 Moos	Men's doubles
Gold medal – first place	2009 Moos	Mixed team
Gold medal – first place	2011 Umhausen	Mixed team
Gold medal – first place	2013 Deutschnofen	Men's singles
Gold medal – first place	2013 Deutschnofen	Men's doubles
Gold medal – first place	2013 Deutschnofen	Mixed team
Gold medal – first place	2015 Sebastian	Men's singles
Gold medal – first place	2015 St. Sebastian	Men's doubles
Gold medal – first place	2019 Latzfons	Men's doubles
Gold medal – first place	2019 Latzfons	Mixed team
Gold medal – first place	2021 Umhausen	Men's doubles
Silver medal – second place	2007 Grande Prairie	Mixed team
Silver medal – second place	2011 Umhausen	Men's doubles
Silver medal – second place	2017 Vatra Dornei	Men's doubles
Silver medal – second place	2017 Vatra Dornei	Mixed team
Silver medal – second place	2023 Deutschnofen	Men's doubles
Bronze medal – third place	2005 Latsch	Men's singles
Bronze medal – third place	2007 Grande Prairie	Men's singles
Bronze medal – third place	2011 Umhausen	Men's singles
Bronze medal – third place	2021 Umhausen	Men's singles
Bronze medal – third place	2025 Tyrol	Men's singles
European Championships
Gold medal – first place	2010 St. Sebastian	Men's singles
Gold medal – first place	2010 St. Sebastian	Men's doubles
Silver medal – second place	2008 Olang	Men's doubles
Silver medal – second place	2010 St. Sebastian	Mixed team
Bronze medal – third place	2006 Umhausen	Men's singles
Bronze medal – third place	2008 Olang	Men's singles

Patrick Pigneter (born 19 July 1987) is an Italian luger who has competed since 2007. A natural track luger, he is a twelve-time World Champion.

== Career ==
Pigneter has won 22 medals at the FIL World Luge Natural Track Championships with 12 golds, five silvers, and five bronze medals.

Pigneter won six medals at the FIL European Luge Natural Track Championships with two golds (men's singles: 2010, men's doubles: 2010), two silvers (men's doubles: 2008, mixed team: 2010) and two bronzes (men's singles: 2006, 2008).

== Personal life ==
Pigneter's father, Raimund, competed in natural track luge from the late 1970s to the mid-1980s.
