= Renate Kasslatter =

Italian luger

Medal record

Natural track luge

Representing Italy

World Championships
Bronze medal – third place	2009 Moos	Women's singles

European Championships
Silver medal – second place	2008 Olang	Women's singles

Renate Kasslatter (born 15 January 1980, in Bolzano) is an Italian luger who has competed since 2000. A natural track luger, she won the bronze medal in the women's singles event at the 2009 FIL World Luge Natural Track Championships in Moos, Italy.

Kasslatter also won a silver medal in the women's singles event at the 2008 FIL European Luge Natural Track Championships in Olang, Italy.
