= Evelin Lanthaler =

Italian luger

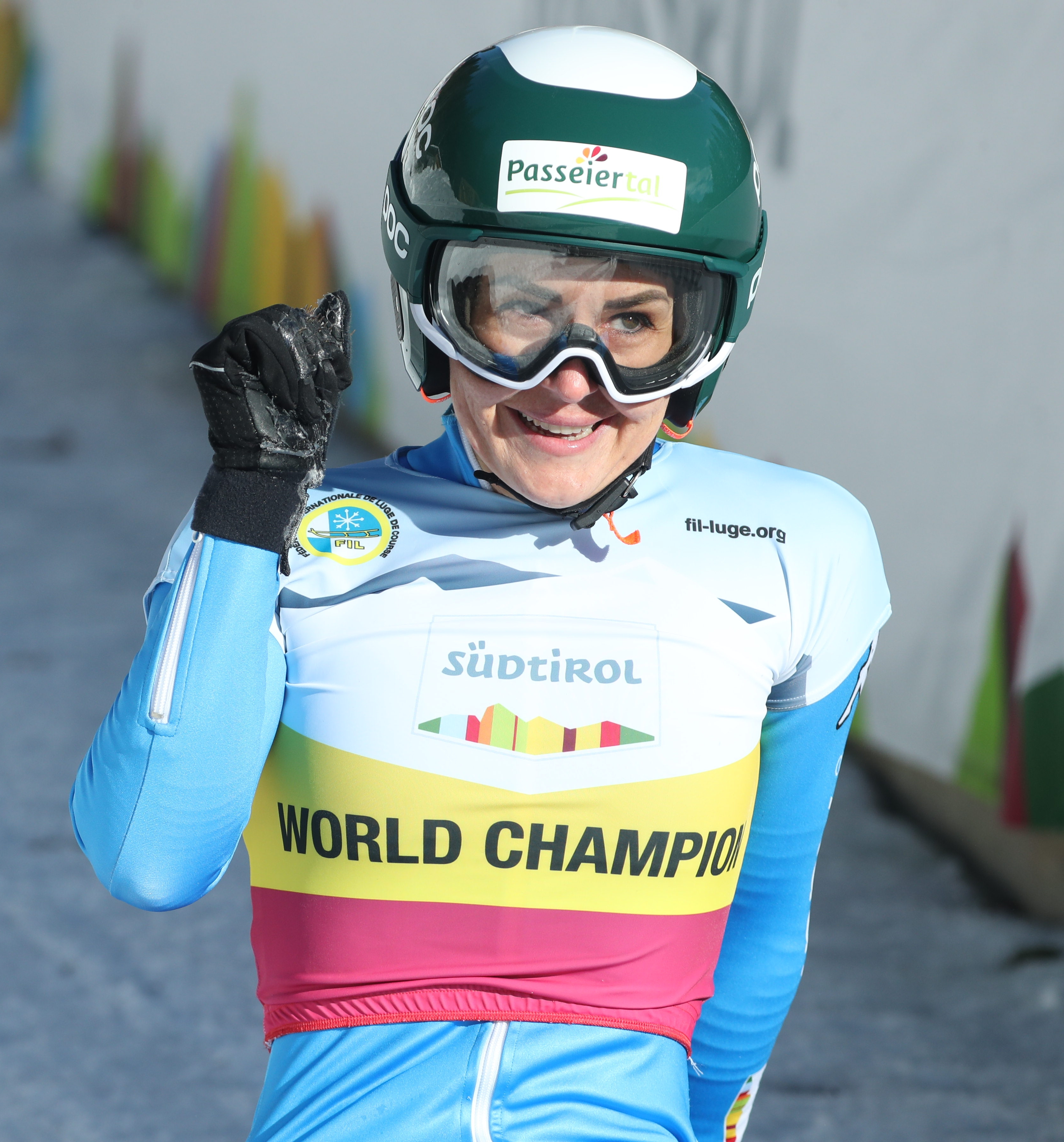
- Lanthaler in 2022

Personal information
- Born: 6 May 1991 (age 35)
Medal record
Women's natural track luge
Representing Italy
World Championships
Gold medal – first place	2015 Sebastian	Singles
Gold medal – first place	2019 Latzfons	Singles
Gold medal – first place	2019 Latzfons	Mixed team
Gold medal – first place	2021 Umhausen	Singles
Gold medal – first place	2021 Umhausen	Mixed team
Gold medal – first place	2023 Deutschnofen	Singles
Gold medal – first place	2023 Deutschnofen	Mixed team
Gold medal – first place	2025 Tyrol	Singles
Gold medal – first place	2025 Tyrol	Mixed team
Silver medal – second place	2017 Vatra Dornei	Singles
Bronze medal – third place	2013 Deutschnofen	Singles
Bronze medal – third place	2013 Deutschnofen	Mixed team
European Championships
Silver medal – second place	2010 St. Sebastian	Singles

Evelin Lanthaler (born 6 May 1991) is an Italian luger who has competed since 2007. A natural track luger, she is a nine-time World Champion.

== Career ==
Lanthaler won a silver medal in the women's singles event at the FIL European Luge Natural Track Championships 2010 in St. Sebastian, Austria.
