= Gerhard Pilz =

Austrian luger (born 1965)

Medal record

Natural track luge

Representing Austria

World Championships
Gold medal – first place	1986 Fénis-Aosta	Men's singles
Gold medal – first place	1990 Gises	Men's singles
Gold medal – first place	1992 Bad Goisern	Men's singles
Gold medal – first place	1994 Gsies	Men's singles
Gold medal – first place	1996 Oberperfuss	Men's singles
Silver medal – second place	2000 Olang-Valadora	Men's singles
Silver medal – second place	2003 Železniki	Men's singles
Silver medal – second place	2003 Železniki	Mixed team
Silver medal – second place	2007 Grande Prairie	Men's singles
Bronze medal – third place	2001 Stein an der Enns	Men's singles

European Championships
Gold medal – first place	2002 Frantschach	Men's singles
Gold medal – first place	2004 Hüttau	Men's singles
Silver medal – second place	1989 Garmisch-Partenkirchen	Men's singles
Bronze medal – third place	1997 Passiria	Men's singles

Gerhard Pilz (born August 17, 1965) is an Austrian luger who competed from 1985 to 2007. A natural track luger, he won ten medals at the FIL World Luge Natural Track Championships with five gold (Singles: 1986, 1990, 1992, 1994, 1996), four silver (Singles: 2000, 2003, 2007. Mixed team: 2003), and one bronze (Singles: 2001).

Pilz found less success at the FIL European Luge Natural Track Championships in the men's singles event, winning only four medals (gold: 2002, 2004; silver: 1989, bronze: 1997).

Pilz retired at the end of the 2006-07 season.
