= FIL World Luge Natural Track Championships 1996 =

The FIL World Luge Natural Track Championships 1996 took place in Oberperfuss, Austria.

== Men's singles ==
Medal	Athlete	Time
Gold	Gerhard Pilz (AUT)	
Silver	Anton Blasbichler (ITA)	
Bronze	Franz Obrist (ITA)	

== Women's singles ==
Medal	Athlete	Time
Gold	Irene Zechner (AUT)	
Silver	Elvira Holzknecht (AUT)	
Bronze	Sandra Mariner (AUT)	

== Men's doubles ==
Medal	Athlete	Time
Gold	Austria (Reinhard Beer, Herbert Kögl)	
Silver	Austria (Andi Ruetz, Helmut Ruetz)	
Bronze	Italy (Martin Psenner, Arthur Konig)	

== Medal table ==
Rank	Nation	Gold	Silver	Bronze	Total
1	Austria (AUT)	3	2	1	6
2	Italy (ITA)	0	1	2	3
Totals (2 entries)		3	3	3	9

== Bibliography ==
- Men's doubles natural track World Champions
- Men's singles natural track World Champions
- Women's singles natural track World Champions
