= Roland Wolf =

Austrian luger

Medal record

Natural track luge

World Championships
Silver medal – second place	1992 Bad Goisern	Men's doubles

Roland Wolf was an Austrian luger who competed from the late 1980s to the early 1990s. A natural track luger, he won the silver medal in the men's doubles event at the 1992 FIL World Luge Natural Track Championships in Bad Goisern, Austria.
