= Aleksey Lebedev (luger) =

Russian luger (born 1982)

Medal record

Natural track luge

Representing Russia

World Championships
Silver medal – second place	2005 Latsch	Mixed team

Aleksey Lebedev (born 1982) is a Russian luger who has competed since 2000. A natural track luger, he won the silver medal in the mixed team event at the 2005 FIL World Luge Natural Track Championships in Latsch, Italy.
