= Melanie Schwarz =

Italian luger

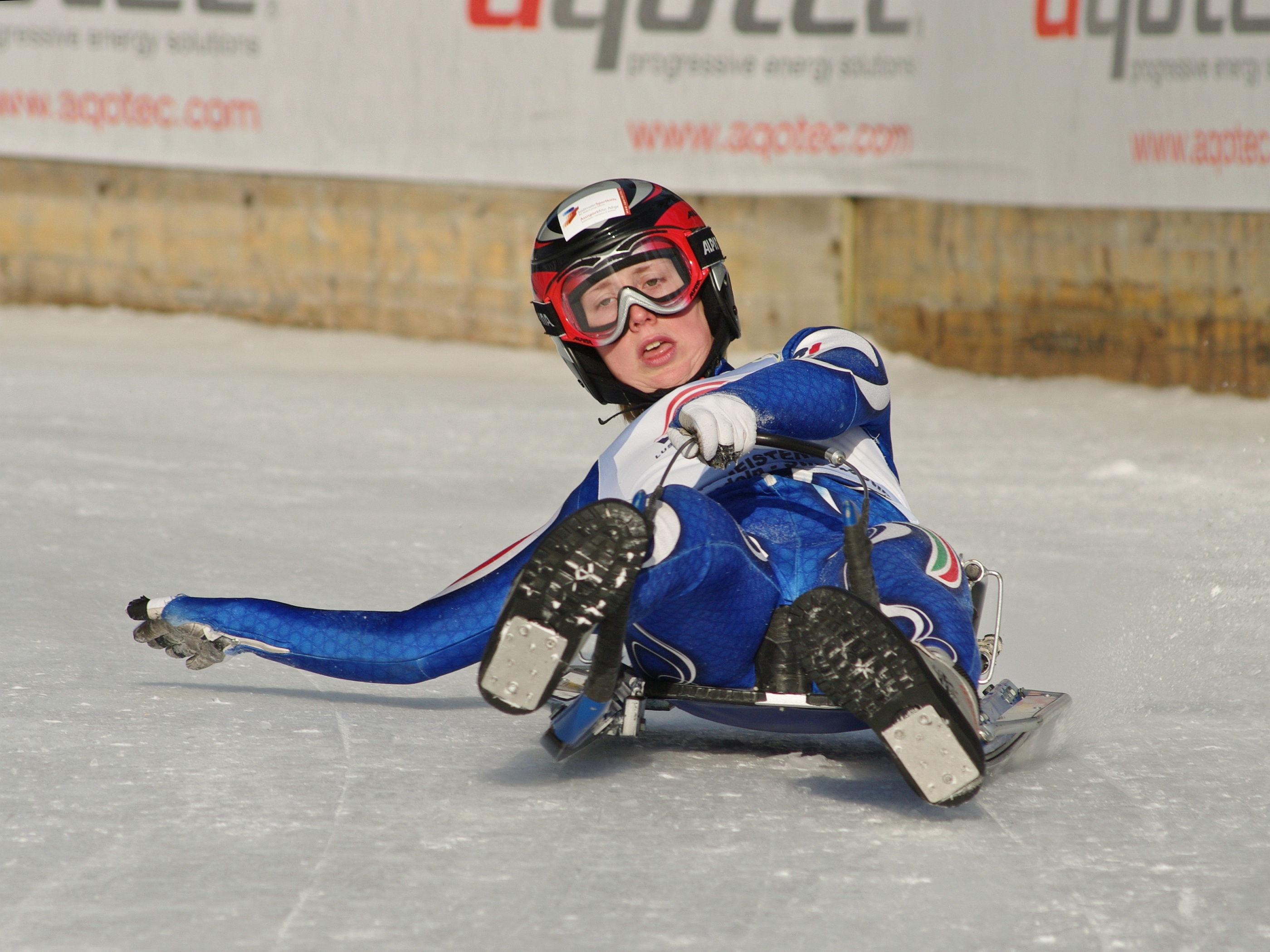

Personal information
- Born: 18 July 1989 (age 36) Schlanders, South Tyrol
Medal record
Natural track luge
Representing Italy
World Championships
Bronze medal – third place	2011 Umhausen	Women's singles

Melanie Schwarz (born 18 July 1989) is an Italian luger who has competed since 1996. A natural track luger, she won a bronze medal in the women's singles event at the 2011 FIL World Luge Natural Track Championships in Umhausen, Austria.
