= Florian Clara =

Italian luger (born 1988)

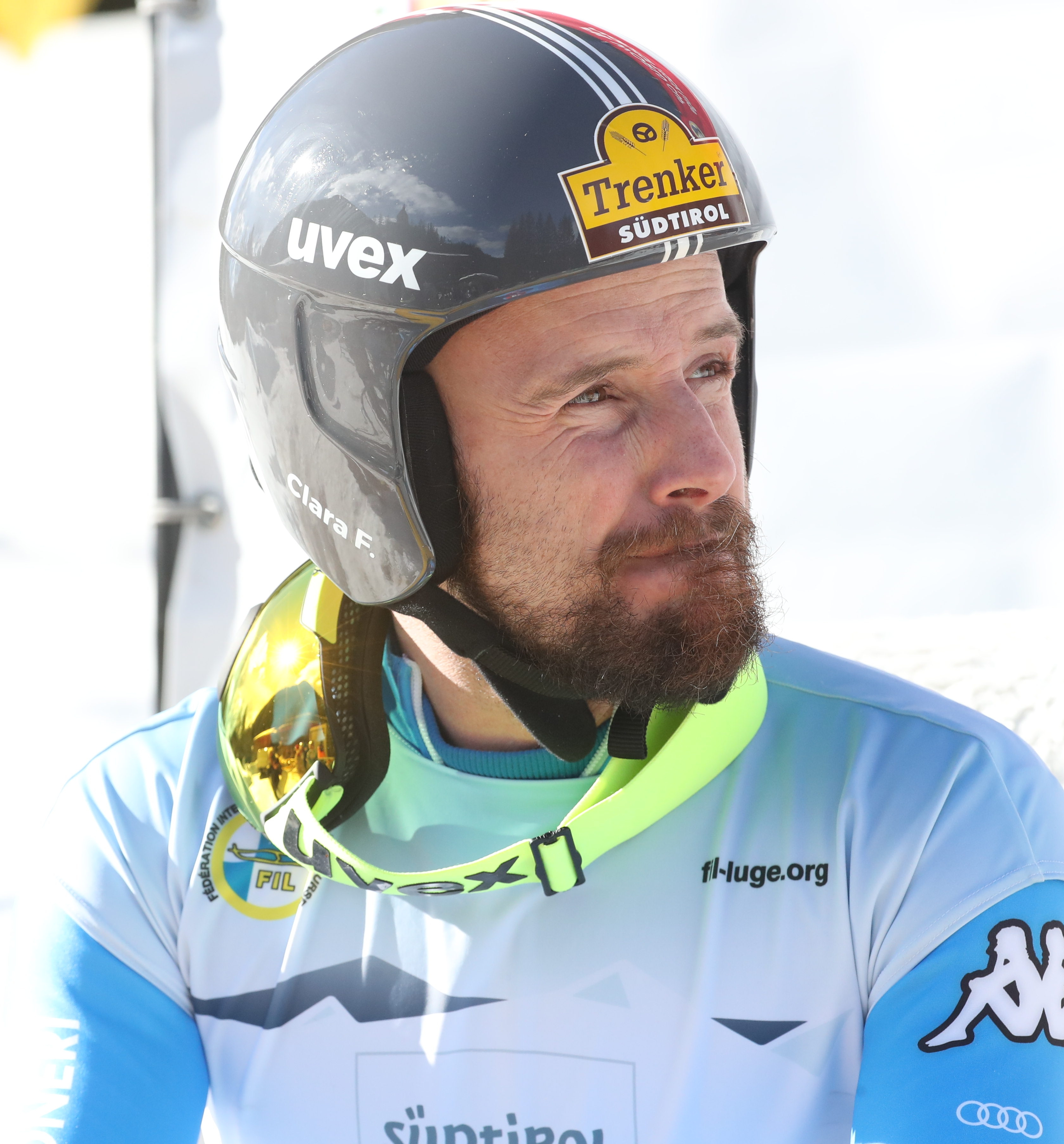
- Clara (2022)

Personal information
- Born: 11 February 1988 (age 38) San Martin de Tor, Italy
Medal record
Natural track luge
Representing Italy
World Championships
Gold medal – first place	2009 Moos	Men's doubles
Gold medal – first place	2009 Moos	Mixed team
Gold medal – first place	2011 Umhausen	Mixed team
Silver medal – second place	2007 Grand Prairie	Mixed team
Silver medal – second place	2011 Umhausen	Men's doubles
European Championships
Gold medal – first place	2010 St. Sebastian	Men's doubles
Silver medal – second place	2008 Olang	Men's doubles
Silver medal – second place	2010 St. Sebastian	Mixed team

Florian Clara (born 11 February 1988) is an Italian luger who has competed since 2005. A natural track luger, he won five medals at the FIL World Luge Natural Track Championships with three golds (Men's doubles: 2009, Mixed team: 2009, 2011) and two silvers (Men's doubles: 2011, Mixed team: 2007).

== Biography ==
Clara also won three medals at the FIL European Luge Natural Track Championships with a gold (men's doubles: 2010) and two silvers (men's doubles: 2008, mixed team: 2010).
