= Christian Schopf =

Austrian luger (born 1988)

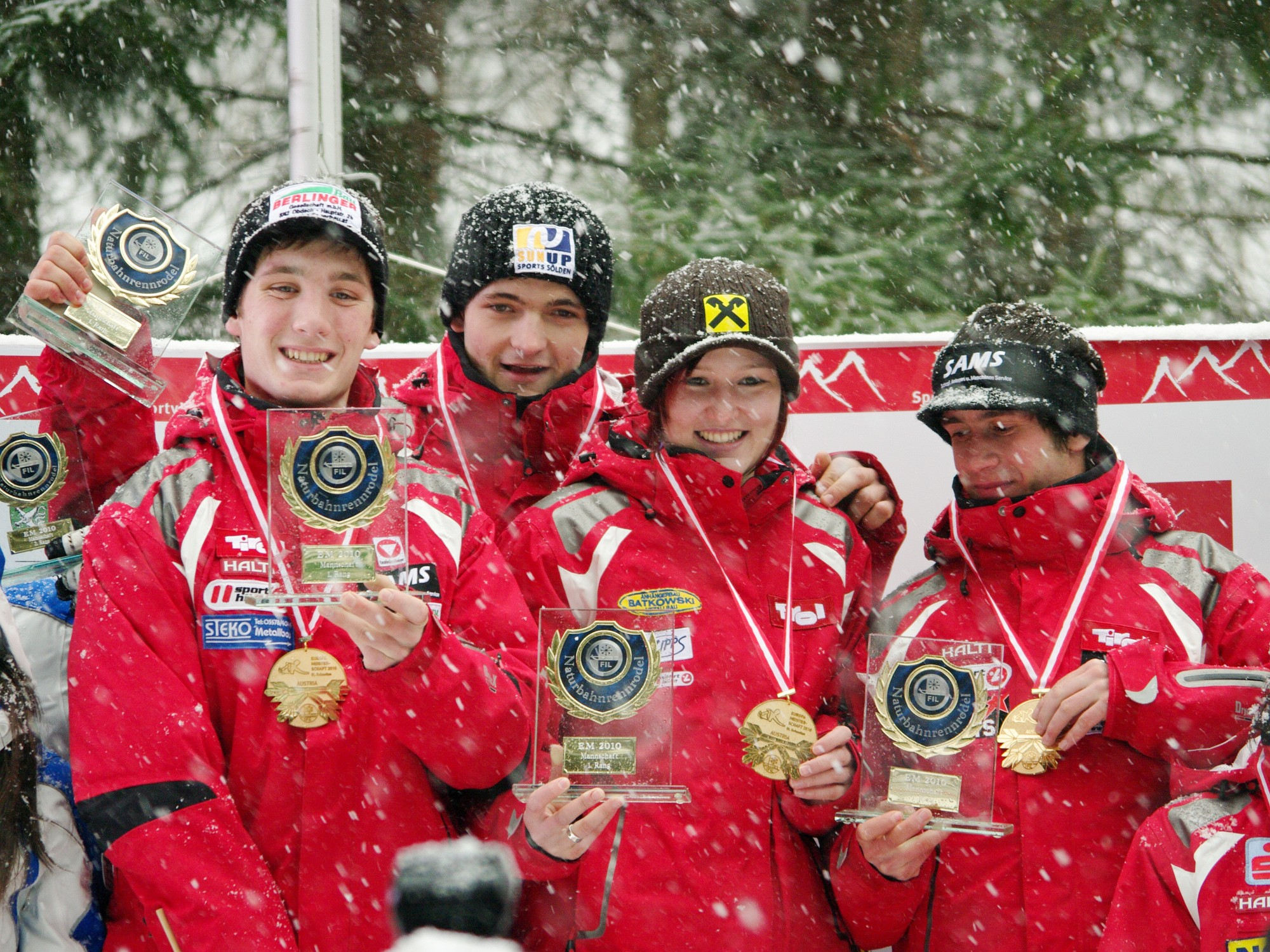
- Schopf (left) at the FIL European Luge Natural Track Championships 2010

Personal information
- Born: 12 March 1988 (age 38)
Medal record
Natural track luge
Representing Austria
World Championships
Silver medal – second place	2009 Moos	Men's doubles
Silver medal – second place	2009 Moos	Mixed team
European Championships
Gold medal – first place	2010 St. Sebastian	Mixed team

Christian Schopf (born 12 March 1988) is an Austrian luger who has competed since 2008. A natural track luger, he won two silver medals at the 2009 FIL World Luge Natural Track Championships in Moos, Italy, earning them in the men's doubles and mixed team events.

Schopf also won a gold medal in the mixed team event at the FIL European Luge Natural Track Championships 2010 in St. Sebastian, Austria.
