= FIL World Luge Natural Track Championships 1992 =

The FIL World Luge Natural Track Championships 1992 took place in Bad Goisern, Austria.

== Men's singles ==
Medal	Athlete	Time
Gold	Gerhard Pilz (AUT)	
Silver	Willi Danklmaier (AUT)	
Bronze	Franz Obrist (ITA)	

== Women's singles ==
Medal	Athlete	Time
Gold	Lyubov Panyutina (CIS)	
Silver	Elvira Holzknecht (AUT)	
Bronze	Irene Koch (AUT)	

Panyutina is the first person not from Austria or Italy to win a World Luge Natural Track Championship event.

== Men's doubles ==
Medal	Athlete	Time
Gold	Italy (Almir Bentemps, Corrado Herin)	
Silver	Austria (Roland Wolf, Stefan Kögler)	
Bronze	Austria (Michael Bischofer, Herbert Kögl)	

== Medal table ==
Rank	Nation	Gold	Silver	Bronze	Total
1	Austria (AUT)	1	3	2	6
2	Italy (ITA)	1	0	1	2
3	CIS (CIS)	1	0	0	1
Totals (3 entries)		3	3	3	9
