= Yekaterina Lavrentyeva =

Russian luger (born 1981)

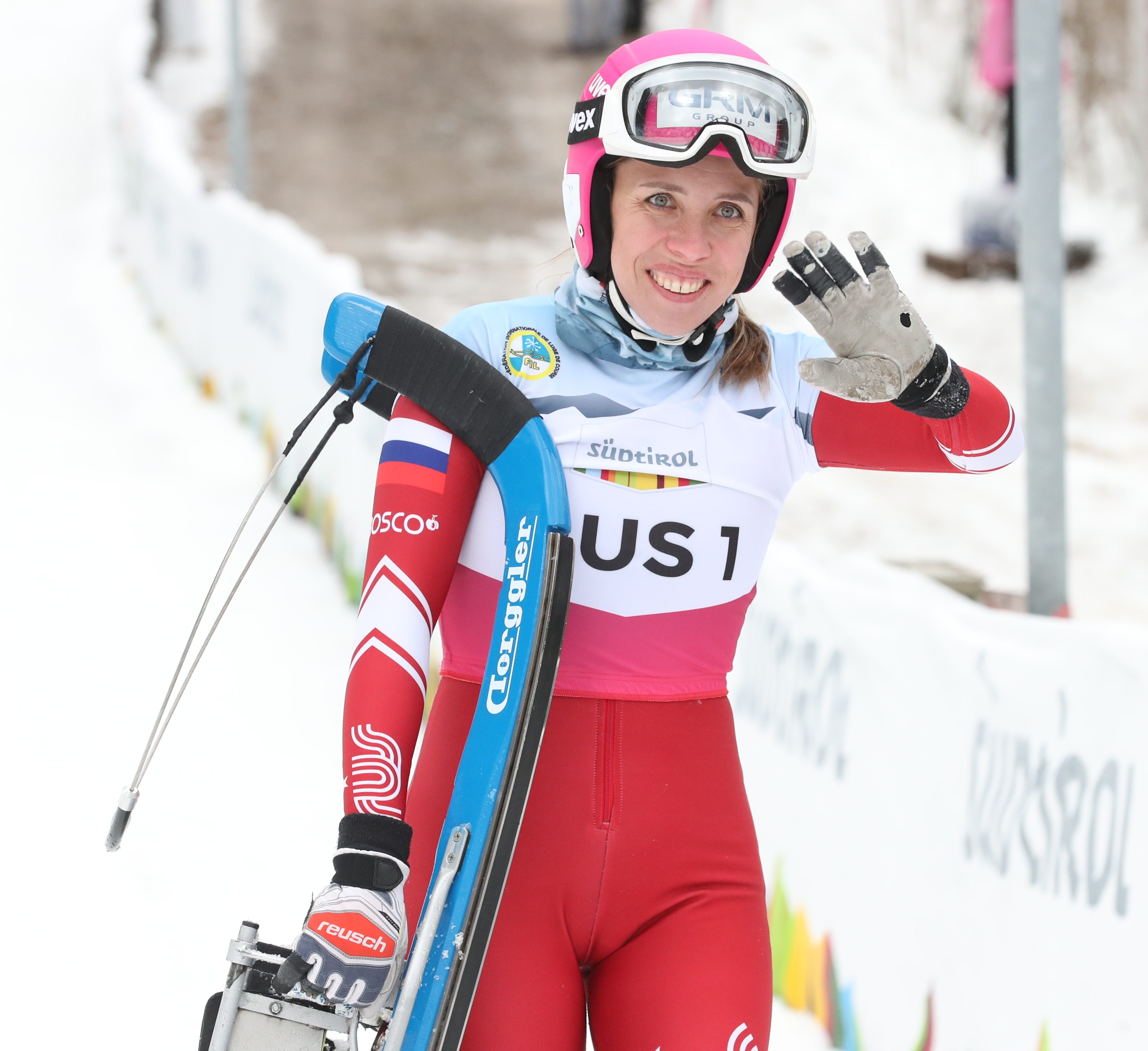
- Lavrentyeva in 2022

Personal information
- Born: 26 June 1981 (age 45)
Medal record
Natural track luge
Representing Russia
World Championships
Gold medal – first place	2000 Olang-Valdaora	Women's singles
Gold medal – first place	2005 Latsch	Women's singles
Gold medal – first place	2007 Grande Prairie	Women's singles
Silver medal – second place	2003 Železniki	Women's singles
Silver medal – second place	2005 Latsch	Mixed team
Silver medal – second place	2009 Moos	Women's singles
Silver medal – second place	2011 Umhausen	Women's singles
Bronze medal – third place	2009 Moos	Mixed team
Bronze medal – third place	2011 Umhausen	Mixed team
European Championships
Gold medal – first place	2004 Hüttau	Women's singles
Gold medal – first place	2008 Olang	Women's singles
Gold medal – first place	2010 St. Sebastian	Women's singles
Silver medal – second place	2002 Frantschach	Women's singles

Yekaterina Lavrentyeva (born 26 June 1981) is a Russian luger who has competed since the late 1990s. A natural track luger, she won eight medals at the FIL World Luge Natural Track Championships with three golds (Women's singles (Gold: 2000, 2005, 2007), four silvers (Women's singles: 2003, 2009, 2011; Mixed team: 2005), and two bronzes (Mixed team: 2009, 2011).

Lavrentyeva also won four medals in the women's singles event at the FIL European Luge Natural Track Championships with three golds (2004, 2008, 2010) and a silver in 2002.
