= FIL World Luge Natural Track Championships 2003 =

The FIL World Luge Natural Track Championships 2003 took place in Železniki, Slovenia.

== Men's singles ==
Medal	Athlete	Time
Gold	Robert Batkowski (AUT)	
Silver	Gerhard Pilz (AUT)	
Bronze	Gerald Kallan (AUT)	

== Women's singles ==
Medal	Athlete	Time
Gold	Sonja Steinacher (ITA)	
Silver	Yekaterina Lavrentyeva (RUS)	
Bronze	Irene Mitterstieler (ITA)	

== Men's doubles ==
Medal	Athlete	Time
Gold	Austria (Wolfgang Schopf, Andreas Schopf)	
Silver	Russia (Pavel Porzhnev, Ivan Lazarev)	
Bronze	Austria (Harald Kleinhofer, Gerhard Mühlbacher)	

== Medal table ==
Rank	Nation	Gold	Silver	Bronze	Total
1	Austria (AUT)	2	1	2	5
2	Italy (ITA)	1	0	1	2
3	Russia (RUS)	0	2	0	2
Totals (3 entries)		3	3	3	9
