= Gruber =

Gruber is a German surname associated with Middle High German word gruobe, 'quarry' or 'pit'. It may be the nickname of a person who lives in a topographic feature of this kind. It may also mean a person who digs pits. It may also refer to a person who lives in a place named Grub. The surname is common in Austria. It may refer to:

== People ==
=== Surname ===
- Aaronel deRoy Gruber (1918–2011), American painter, sculptor, photographer and artist
- Adolf Gruber (1920–1994), Austrian long-distance runner
- Alex Gruber (born 1992), Italian luger
- Alexander Gruber, German bobsledder
- Andrea Gruber, American singer
- Andreas Gruber, multiple people
- Attila Gruber (born 1958), Hungarian jurist, politician and diplomat
- Barbara Gruber (born 1977), German ski mountaineer
- Ben Gruber (born 1972), American screenwriter and producer
- Bernhard Gruber (born 1982), Austrian Nordic combined skier
- Bettina Gruber (born 1985), Swiss cross-country skier
- Bob Gruber (born 1958), American football tackle
- Carola Gruber, German author
- Charlie Gruber (born 1978), American athletics competitor
- Christoph Gruber (born 1976), Austrian alpine skier
- Craig Gruber (1951–2015), American musician
- David Gruber, American marine biologist
- Desiree Gruber (born 1967), American publicist
- Detlef Gruber (1952–2025), Austrian school administrator and politician
- Don Gruber (1930–2019), American politician
- Edmund L. Gruber (1879–1941) US Army general, composer of military music, and brother of William R. Gruber
- Fabio Gruber (born 2002), Peruvian footballer
- Ferry Gruber (1926–2004), Austrian-German tenor in opera and operetta
- Florian Gruber (born 1983), German racing driver
- Francis Gruber (1912–1948), French painter
- Frank Gruber (1904–1969), writer of Westerns and detective fiction
- Franz Gruber, multiple people
- Freddie Gruber (1927–2011), American jazz drummer and teacher
- Friedrich Gruber (born 1968), Austrian sailor
- Gabriel Gruber (1740–1805), Viennese Jesuit, architect and hydraulics expert
- Gary Gruber (1940–2019), scientist, educator, author
- Georg Gruber (1904–1979), Austrian-born musicologist, composer, and educator
- Gerd Gruber (born 1982), Austrian ice hockey defenceman
- Gerhard Gruber (born 1951), Austrian pianist
- Gerlinde Gruber, Austrian art historian and curator
- Gernot Gruber (born 1939), Austrian musicologist
- Gerold Gruber (born 1958), Austrian musicologist
- Gertraud Gruber (1921–2022), German beautician and businesswoman
- György Gruber (1954–2009), Hungarian sports shooter
- Hans Gruber, multiple people
- Heinrich Grüber (1891–1975), German theologian, pacifist and pastor
- Heinz Karl Gruber (born 1943), Austrian composer (a descendant of Franz Xavier)
- Hendrik Gruber (born 1986), German pole vaulter
- Henry Gruber (1863–1932), American baseball player
- Herb Gruber (1901–1979), American football player
- Herbert Gruber (born 1942), Austrian bobsledder
- Howard Gruber (1922–2005), professor of psychology of creativity
- Hugó Gruber (1938–2012), Hungarian stage and film actor
- Imelda Gruber (born 1986), Italian luger
- Ira D. Gruber (1934–2025), American author, bibliographer, and military historian
- Jacob W. Gruber (1921–2019), American anthropologist, archaeologist, scientist and educator
- Jacques Grüber (1870–1936), French woodworker and stained-glass artist
- James Gruber (1928–2011), American teacher and early LGBT rights activist
- James Gruber (politician), American politician
- Jan Gruber (born 1984), Czech rower
- Jeremy Gruber (born 1971), Jewish-American civil rights activist
- Jesús Gruber (1936–2021), Venezuelan fencer
- Johann Gruber (1889–1944), Austrian Roman Catholic priest
- Johann Gottfried Gruber (1774–1851), German literary historian and critic
- John Gruber (born 1973), American software engineer, co-developer of Markdown, and blogger (Daring Fireball)
- Jonathan Gruber, multiple people
- Jordan Gruber (born 1983), American-Israeli soccer player
- Joseph Gruber (1912–1967), Austrian football player and manager
- Juan García Gruber (1904–1997), Venezuelan economist, financier, writer, philosopher and diplomat
- Juliette Gruber (born 1965), British actress
- June Gruber, American clinical psychologist
- Karl Gruber (1909–1995), foreign minister of Austria from 1945 to 1953
- Kelly Gruber (born 1962), U.S. Major League Baseball player
- Klaus Michael Grüber (1941–2008), German theatre director and actor
- Konstantin Gruber (born 1979), Austrian tennis player
- Kurt Gruber (1904–1943), Nazi politician
- Kurt Gruber (aviator) (1896–1918), Austro-Hungarian flying ace
- Leni Gruber, Austrian film director and screenwriter
- Leopold Franz Gruber (c. 1710–1784), Austrian politician
- Lilli Gruber (born 1957), Italian television journalist and politician
- Malvina Gruber (1900–?), Czech Jewish Comintern agent
- Marc Gruber, German management scholar and researcher
- Marie Gruber (1955-2018), German actress
- Martin Gruber (disambiguation), multiple people
- Max von Gruber (1853–1927), Austrian bacteriologist
- Michael Gruber, multiple people
- Mieczyslaw Gruber (1913–2006), Jewish resistance fighter
- Monika Gruber (born 1971), German cabaret artist and actress
- Patrick Gruber (born 1978), Italian luger
- Paul Gruber (born 1965), professional football player for the Tampa Bay Buccaneers (1988–1999)
- Paula Gruber (born 1974), New Zealand cricketer
- Peter Gruber, multiple people
- Reinhard Gruber (born 1977), Italian luger
- Rigobert Gruber (born 1961), German footballer
- Robert I. Gruber, United States Air Force officer
- Rony Gruber (born 1963), Israeli movie director and scriptwriter
- Ruth Gruber (1911–2016), Jewish-American journalist and author of "I visited the Soviet Arctic"
- Samuel Gruber, multiple people
- Scarlet Gruber (born 1989), Venezuelan actress
- Staci Gruber, psychiatrist
- Stefan Gruber (born 1975), American performance artist, animator and educator
- Steff Gruber (born 1953), Swiss filmmaker
- Terry deRoy Gruber, American photographer, author and filmmaker
- Theodor Gruber, Austrian chess player
- Tom Gruber (born 1959), American computer scientist, inventor, and entrepreneur
- Wenzel Gruber (1814–1890), Austrian anatomist
- Werner Gruber (born 1970), Austrian physicist and author
- William Gruber, multiple people
- Wolfgang Gruber (born 1953), German boxer
- Ziggy Gruber, American chef and restaurateur
- Zsombor Gruber (born 2004), Hungarian footballer

=== Nickname ===
(See also the longer list at de:wiki)

- Dave "Gruber" Allen (born 1958), American comedian and actor

== Fictional characters ==
- Hans Gruber (character), a fictional character and the main antagonist in the film Die Hard (1988)
- Lieutenant Hubert Gruber, a fictional character from the British sitcom 'Allo 'Allo!
- Lester Gruber, a fictional torpedoman's mate on the American television series McHale's Navy
- Mr. Gruber, a recurring character in the Paddington Bear series
- Gruber, Gaster's villainous sidekick in PaRappa the Rapper anime
- Simon Gruber, a fictional character and the main antagonist in the film Die Hard with a Vengeance (1995), portrayed by Jeremy Irons
- Rolf Gruber, a fictional character in the film The Sound of Music (1965)
- Hans Gruber, a character from the movie Re-Animator

== See also ==
- Grube
