= Grubb (disambiguation) =

Grubb is a surname. It may also refer to:

- J. Grubb Alexander (1887–1932), American screenwriter
- Grubb Street (disambiguation)
- Grubb Glacier, Graham Land, Antarctica
- Grubb Telescope Company, later known as Grubb Parsons

== See also ==
- Grub (disambiguation)
- Grubbe
- Grubbs (disambiguation)
