= Corbinian Böhm =

German painter, installation artist and sculptor

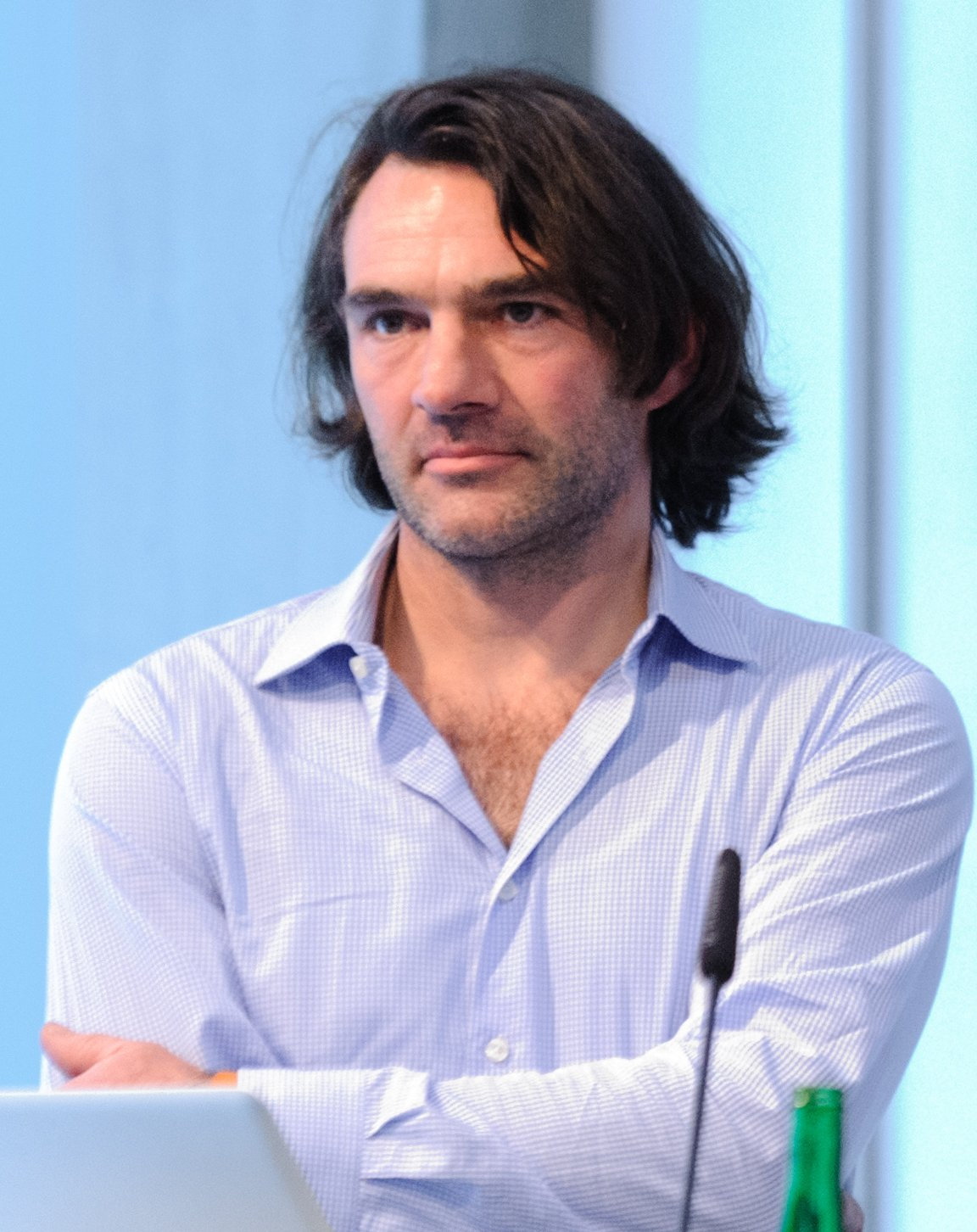
- Böhm in 2012
- Born: 7 August 1966 (age 59); Munich, West Germany
- Education: LMU Munich, Academy of Fine Arts, Munich
- Known for: Painting, Drawing, Sculpture, Installation art

Corbinian Böhm (born Munich, 7 August 1966) is a German painter, installation artist and sculptor.

== Biography ==
Böhm has grown up with five siblings in Harlaching, a borough of Munich. One of his brothers is the ski mountaineer Benedikt Böhm. After finishing his secondary education with the abitur he studied art history at LMU Munich until 1990. Afterwards, he first graduated from an apprenticeship as sculptor (wood, stone) and then he was majoring in sculpture at the Academy of Fine Arts, Munich. He was taught there by Hans Ladner, Pia Stadtbäumer, Antony Gormley, Timm Ulrichs, Asta Gröting and Rita McBride.

Since 1995, he is working with his partner Michael Gruber under the name Empfangshalle.

In 2000, he got his "Meisterschüler" diplom (comparable with a Master of Fine Arts degree).

== See also ==
- List of German painters
