= Happiness =

Positive emotional state

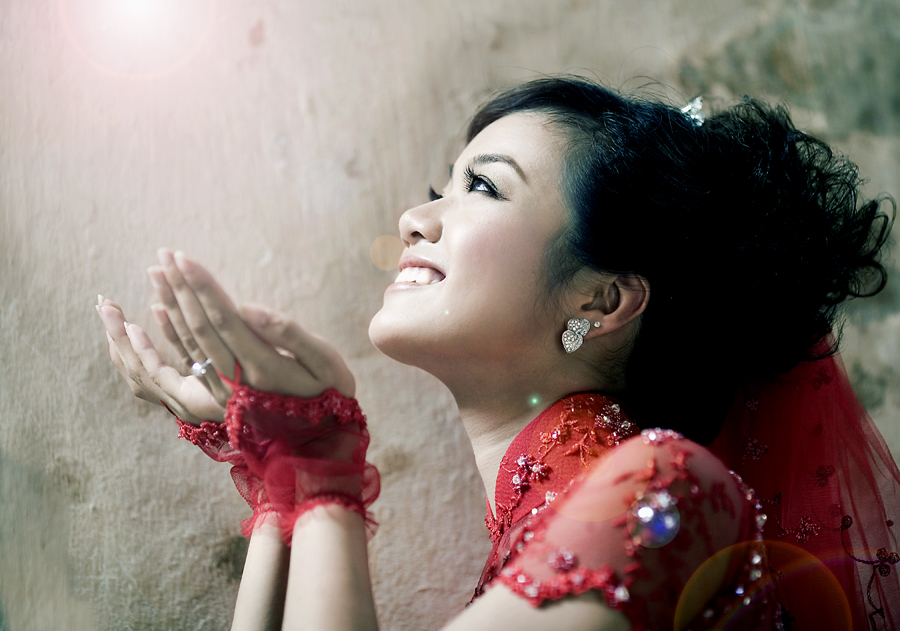
Smiling woman from Vietnam. Her smile and facial expression indicates her happiness.

Happiness is a complex and multifaceted mental state that encompasses a range of positive feelings, from contentment to intense joy. It is often associated with positive life experiences, such as achieving goals, spending time with loved ones, or engaging in enjoyable activities. However, happiness can also arise spontaneously, without any apparent external cause.

Happiness is closely linked to well-being and overall life satisfaction. Studies have shown that individuals who experience higher levels of happiness tend to have better physical and mental health, stronger social relationships, and greater resilience in the face of adversity.

The pursuit of happiness has been a central theme in philosophy and psychology for centuries. While there is no single, universally accepted definition of happiness, it is generally understood to be a state of mind characterized by positive emotions, a sense of purpose, and a feeling of fulfillment.

== Definitions ==
"Happiness" is subject to debate on usage and meaning, and on possible differences in understanding by culture.

The word is mostly used in relation to two factors:

- the current experience of the feeling of an emotion (affect) such as pleasure or joy, or of a more general sense of 'emotional condition as a whole'. (Note: Dan Haybron states "I would suggest that when we talk about happiness, we are actually referring, much of the time, to a complex emotional phenomenon. Call it emotional well-being. Happiness as emotional well-being concerns your emotions and moods, more broadly your emotional condition as a whole. To be happy is to inhabit a favorable emotional state.... On this view, we can think of happiness, loosely, as the opposite of anxiety and depression. Being in good spirits, quick to laugh and slow to anger, at peace and untroubled, confident and comfortable in your own skin, engaged, energetic and full of life." Haybron has also used the term thymic, by which he means 'overall mood state' in this context; Xavier Landes has described a similar concept of mood.) For instance Daniel Kahneman has defined happiness as "what I experience here and now". This usage is prevalent in dictionary definitions of happiness.
- appraisal of life satisfaction, such as of quality of life. For instance Ruut Veenhoven has defined happiness as "overall appreciation of one's life as-a-whole." "'Happiness' is often used, in ordinary life, to refer to a short-lived state of a person, frequently a feeling of contentment: 'You look happy today'; 'I'm very happy for you'. Philosophically, its scope is more often wider, encompassing a whole life. And in philosophy it is possible to speak of the happiness of a person's life, or of their happy life, even if that person was in fact usually pretty miserable. The point is that some good things in their life made it a happy one, even though they lacked contentment. But this usage is uncommon, and may cause confusion.' Kahneman has said that this is more important to people than current experience.

Some usages can include both of these factors. Subjective well-being (swb) (Note: e.g. 'Can Happiness be Measured', Action for Happiness,) includes measures of current experience (emotions, moods, and feelings) and of life satisfaction. (Note: See Subjective well-being#Components of SWB) For instance Sonja Lyubomirsky has described happiness as "the experience of joy, contentment, or positive well-being, combined with a sense that one's life is good, meaningful, and worthwhile." Eudaimonia, is a Greek term variously translated as happiness, welfare, flourishing, and blessedness. Xavier Landes has proposed that happiness include measures of subjective well-being, mood and eudaimonia.

These differing uses can give different results. Whereas Nordic countries often score highest on swb surveys, South American countries score higher on affect-based surveys of current positive life experiencing.

The implied meaning of the word may vary depending on context, qualifying happiness as a polyseme and a fuzzy concept.

A further issue is when measurement is made; appraisal of a level of happiness at the time of the experience may be different from appraisal via memory at a later date.

Some users accept these issues, but continue to use the word because of its convening power.

=== Happiness vs joy ===
German philosophy professor Michela Summa says that the distinction between joy and happiness is that "joy accompanies the process through and through, whereas happiness seems to be more strictly tied to the moment of achievement of the process... joy is not only a direct emotional response to an event that is embedded in our life-concerns but is also tightly bound to the present moment, whereas happiness presupposes an evaluative stance concerning one period of one's life or one's own life as a whole."

== Measurement ==
Worldwide levels of happiness as measured by the World Happiness Report (2023)

People have been trying to measure happiness for centuries. In 1780, the English utilitarian philosopher Jeremy Bentham proposed that as happiness was the primary goal of humans, it should be measured as a way of determining how well the government was performing.

Today, happiness is typically measured using self-report surveys. Self-reporting is prone to cognitive biases and other sources of errors, such as peak–end rule. Studies show that memories of felt emotions can be inaccurate. Affective forecasting research shows that people are poor predictors of their future emotions, including how happy they will be.

Happiness economists are not overly concerned with philosophical and methodological issues and continue to use questionaries to measure average happiness of populations.

Several scales have been developed to measure happiness:

- The Subjective Happiness Scale (SHS) is a four-item scale, measuring global subjective happiness from 1999. The scale requires participants to use absolute ratings to characterize themselves as happy or unhappy individuals, as well as it asks to what extent they identify themselves with descriptions of happy and unhappy individuals.
- The Positive and Negative Affect Schedule (PANAS) from 1988 is a 20-item questionnaire, using a five-point Likert scale (1 = very slightly or not at all, 5 = extremely) to assess the relation between personality traits and positive or negative affects at "this moment, today, the past few days, the past week, the past few weeks, the past year, and in general". A longer version with additional affect scales was published 1994.
- The Satisfaction with Life Scale (SWLS) is a global cognitive assessment of life satisfaction developed by Ed Diener. A seven-point Likert scale is used to agree or disagree with five statements about one's life.
- The Cantril ladder method has been used in the World Happiness Report. Respondents are asked to think of a ladder, with the best possible life for them being a 10, and the worst possible life being a 0. They are then asked to rate their own current lives on that 0 to 10 scale.
- Positive Experience; the survey by Gallup asks if, the day before, people experienced enjoyment, laughing or smiling a lot, feeling well-rested, being treated with respect, learning or doing something interesting. 9 of the top 10 countries in 2018 were South American, led by Paraguay and Panama. Country scores range from 85 to 43.
- The Oxford Happiness Inventory is a comprehensive assessment tool consisting of 29 items, in which the person has to choose one of four options. It is user-friendly and easy to administer. This questionnaire shows the amount of well-being of a person. Providing quality insights of the happiness of one person.

Since 2012, a World Happiness Report has been published. Happiness is evaluated, as in "How happy are you with your life as a whole?", and in emotional reports, as in "How happy are you now?," and people seem able to use happiness as appropriate in these verbal contexts. Using these measures, the report identifies the countries with the highest levels of happiness. In subjective well-being measures, the primary distinction is between cognitive life evaluations and emotional reports.

The UK began to measure national well-being in 2012, following Bhutan, which had already been measuring gross national happiness.

Academic economists and international economic organizations are arguing for and developing multi-dimensional dashboards which combine subjective and objective indicators to provide a more direct and explicit assessment of human wellbeing. There are many different contributors to adult wellbeing, such as the point that happiness judgements partly reflect the presence of salient constraints, and that fairness, autonomy, community and engagement are key aspects of happiness and wellbeing throughout the life course. Although these factors play a role in happiness, they do not all need to improve simultaneously to help one achieve an increase in happiness.

Happiness has been found to be quite stable over time. The happiness tends to increase with age, with young adults the least happy.

== Genetics and heritability ==
As of 2016, no evidence of happiness causing improved physical health has been found; the topic is being researched at the Lee Kum Sheung Center for Health and Happiness at the Harvard T.H. Chan School of Public Health. A positive relationship has been suggested between the volume of the brain's gray matter in the right precuneus area and one's subjective happiness score.

Sonja Lyubomirsky has estimated that 50 percent of a given human's happiness level could be genetically determined, 10 percent is affected by life circumstances and situation, and a remaining 40 percent of happiness is subject to self-control.

When discussing genetics and their effects on individuals it is important to first understand that genetics do not predict behavior. It is possible for genes to increase the likelihood of individuals being happier compared to others, but they do not 100 percent predict behavior.

At this point in scientific research, it has been hard to find a lot of evidence to support this idea that happiness is affected in some way by genetics. In a 2016 study, Michael Minkov and Michael Harris Bond found that a gene by the name of SLC6A4 was not a good predictor of happiness level in humans.

On the other hand, there have been many studies that have found genetics to be a key part in predicting and understanding happiness in humans. In a review article discussing many studies on genetics and happiness, they discussed the common findings. The author found an important factor that has affected scientist findings this being how happiness is measured. For example, in certain studies when subjective wellbeing is measured as a trait heredity is found to be higher, about 70 to 90 percent. In another study, 11,500 unrelated genotypes were studied, and the conclusion was the heritability was only 12 to 18 percent. Overall, this article found the common percent of heredity was about 20 to 50 percent.

== Causes and achievement methods ==
Theories on how to achieve happiness include "encountering unexpected positive events", "seeing a significant other", and "basking in the acceptance and praise of others". Some others believe that happiness is not solely derived from external, momentary pleasures.

Research on positive psychology, well-being, eudaimonia and happiness, and the theories of Diener, Ryff, Keyes, and Seligman covers a broad range of levels and topics, including "the biological, personal, relational, institutional, cultural, and global dimensions of life." The psychiatrist George Vaillant and the director of longitudinal Study of Adult Development at Harvard University Robert J. Waldinger found that those who were happiest and healthier reported strong interpersonal relationships. Research showed that adequate sleep contributes to well-being. Good mental health and good relationships contribute more to happiness than income does. In 2018, Laurie R. Santos course titled "Psychology and the Good Life" became the most popular course in the history of Yale University and was made available for free online to non-Yale students. In 2020, the course had 1,153,744 people enroll 10.5 million people visit the site. Santos explains that during the COVID-19 crisis people were looking for evidence-based ways to improve not only their physical health, but also their mental health.

Some commentators focus on the difference between the hedonistic tradition of seeking pleasant and avoiding unpleasant experiences, and the eudaimonic tradition of living life in a full and deeply satisfying way. Kahneman has said that ""When you look at what people want for themselves, how they pursue their goals, they seem more driven by the search for satisfaction than the search for happiness."

Viktor Frankl, a psychiatrist and prisoner in the Nazi concentration camps during World War II, noticed that those who lost hope soon died, while those who held to meaning and purpose tended to live on. Frankl observed that joy and misery had more to do with a person's perspective and choice than with their surroundings. Three key sources of meaning that he highlights in his writings include the following:

1. Creation of an important work, or doing a deed.
2. Love, as manifest in thoroughly encountering another person or experience.
3. Finding meaning in unavoidable suffering, such as seeing it as a sacrifice or learning opportunity.

Psychologist Robert Emmons has identified the centrality of goals in pursuing happiness. He found that when humans pursue meaningful projects and activities without primarily focusing on happiness, happiness often results as a by-product. Indicators of meaningfulness predict positive effects on life, while lack of meaning predicts negative states such as psychological distress. Emmons summarizes the four categories of meaning which have appeared throughout various studies. He proposes to call them WIST, or work, intimacy, spirituality, and transcendence.

Throughout life, one's views of happiness and what brings happiness can evolve. In early and emerging adulthood many people focus on seeking happiness through friends, objects, and money. Middle aged-adults generally transition from searching for object-based happiness to looking for happiness in money and relationships. In older adulthood, people tend to focus more on personal peace and lasting relationships (ex. children, spouse, grandchildren). Antti Kauppinen, a Swedish philosopher and phenomenological researcher, posited that the perception of time affects the change in focus throughout life. In early adulthood, most view life optimistically, looking to the future and seeing an entire life ahead of them. Those that fall into the middle life, see that life has passed behind them as well as seeing more life ahead. Those in older adulthood often see their lives as behind them. This shift in perspective causes a shift in the pursuit of happiness from more tactile, object based happiness, to social and relational based happiness.

=== Self-fulfilment theories ===
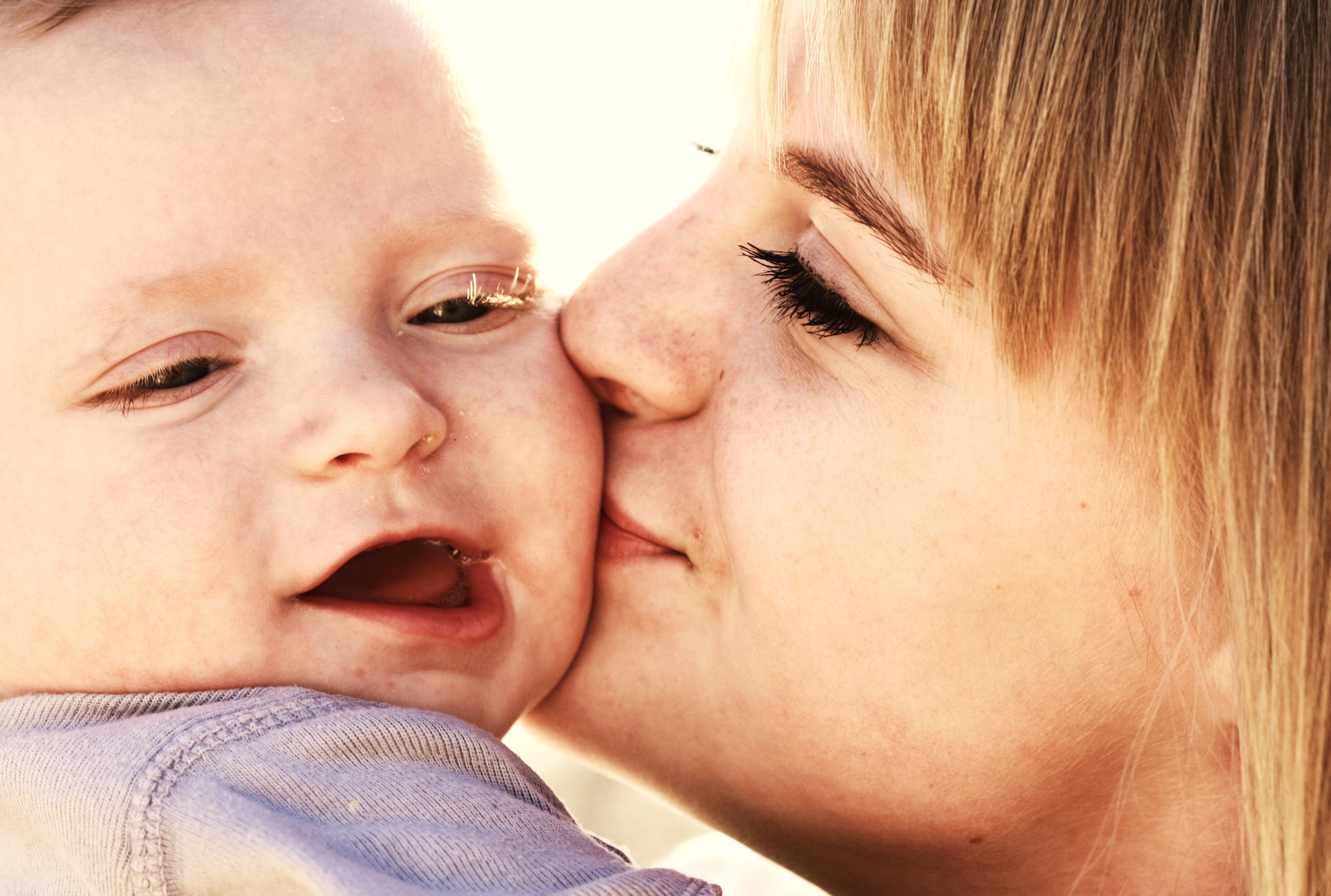
Woman kissing a baby on the cheek

Maslow's hierarchy of needs is a pyramid depicting the levels of human needs, psychological, and physical. When a human being ascends the steps of the pyramid, self-actualization is reached. Beyond the routine of needs fulfillment, Maslow envisioned moments of extraordinary experience, known as peak experiences, profound moments of love, understanding, happiness, or rapture, during which a person feels more whole, alive, self-sufficient, and yet a part of the world. This is similar to the flow concept of Mihály Csíkszentmihályi. The concept of flow is the idea that after our basic needs are met we can achieve greater happiness by altering our consciousness by becoming so engaged in a task that we lose our sense of time. Our intense focus causes us to forget any other issues, which in return promotes positive emotions.

Erich Fromm said "Happiness is the indication that man has found the answer to the problem of human existence: the productive realization of his potentialities and thus, simultaneously, being one with the world and preserving the integrity of his self. In spending his energy productively he increases his powers, he 'burns without being consumed.'"

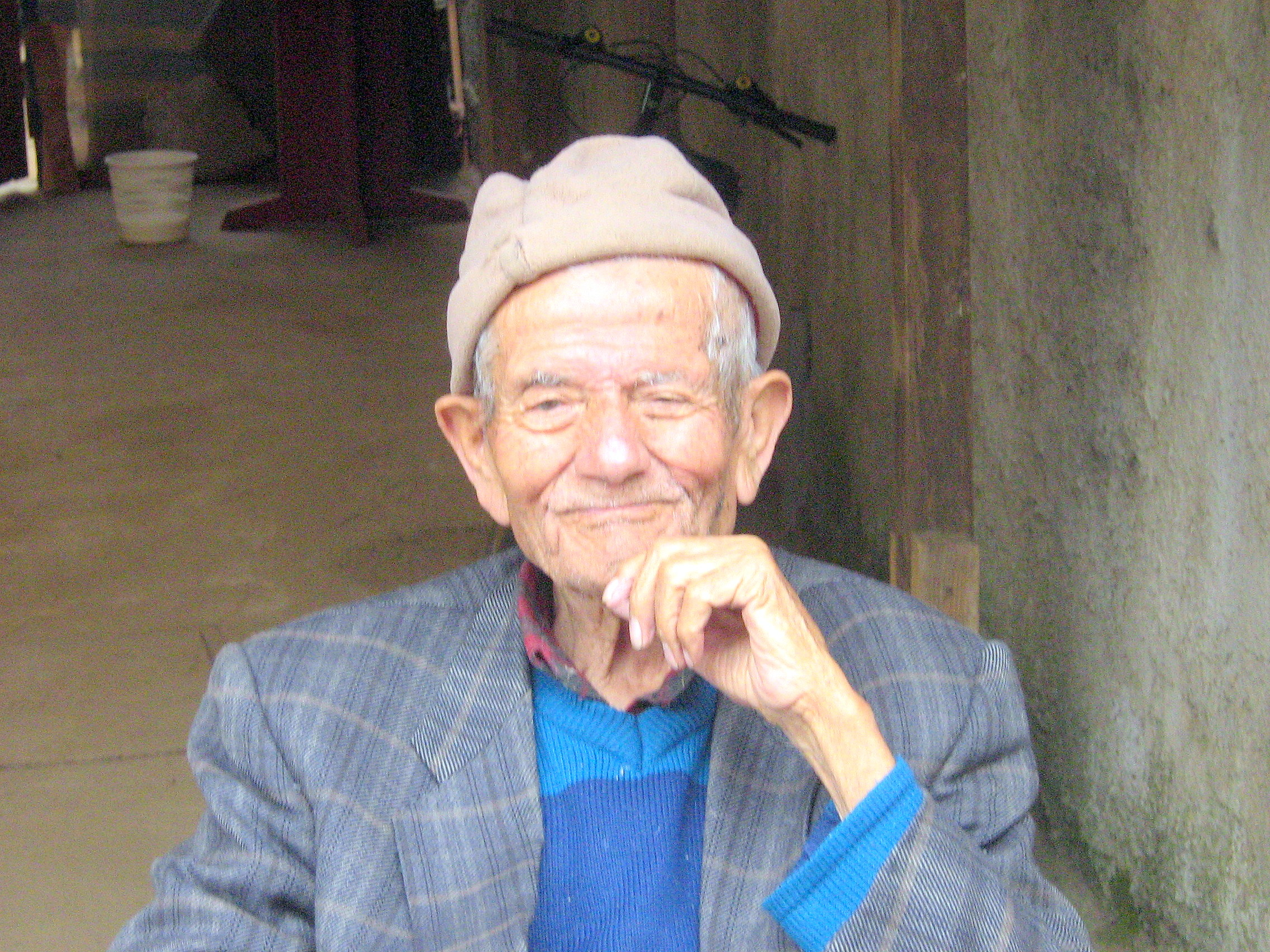
A 93-year-old man from Pichilemu, Chile

Self-determination theory relates intrinsic motivation to three needs: competence, autonomy, and relatedness. Competence refers to an individual's ability to be effective in their interactions with the environment, autonomy refers to a person's flexibility in choice and decision making, and relatedness is the need to establish warm, close personal relationships.

Ronald Inglehart has traced cross-national differences in the level of happiness based on data from the World Values Survey. He finds that the extent to which a society allows free choice has a major impact on happiness. When basic needs are satisfied, the degree of happiness depends on economic and cultural factors that enable free choice in how people live their lives. Happiness also depends on religion in countries where free choice is constrained.

Sigmund Freud said that all humans strive after happiness, but that the possibilities of achieving it are restricted because we "are so made that we can derive intense enjoyment only from a contrast and very little from the state of things."

The idea of motivational hedonism is the theory that pleasure is the aim for human life.

=== Positive psychology ===
Since 2000 the field of positive psychology, which focuses on the study of happiness and human flourishing rather than maladjusted behavior or illness, expanded drastically in terms of scientific publications. It was introduced by psychologist Martin Seligman in 1998 who argued that psychology had long focused on mental illness and bringing people from "minus five to zero," but that it should also study the conditions that allow individuals to thrive and move from "zero to plus five." It has produced many different views on causes of happiness, and on factors that correlate with happiness, such as positive social interactions with family and friends.

These factors include six key virtues:

1. Wisdom and knowledge, which includes creativity, curiosity, love of learning and open-mindedness.
2. Courage, which includes bravery, persistence, integrity, and vitality.
3. Humanity, which includes love, kindness, and social intelligence.
4. Justice, which includes leadership, fairness, and loyalty.
5. Temperance, which includes self-regulation, prudence, forgiveness, humility, patience and modesty.
6. Transcendence, which includes religious/spirituality, hope, gratitude, appreciation of beauty and excellence, and humor.

Seligman later formalized positive psychology with the PERMA model (Positive Emotion, Engagement, Relationships, Meaning, and Accomplishment), introduced in 2011. The model has since been widely used in positive psychology research as a framework for understanding well-being.

In order for a virtue to be considered a key strength in the field of positive psychology it must meet the demands of 12 criteria, namely ubiquity (cross-cultural), fulfilling, morally valued, does not diminish others, be a nonfelicitous opposite (have a clear antonym that is negative), traitlike, measurable, distinct, have paragons (distinctly show up in individuals' behaviors), have prodigies (show up in youth), be selectively absent (distinctly does not show up in some individuals), and is supported by some institutions.

Numerous short-term self-help interventions have been developed and demonstrated to improve happiness.

Yale researcher Emma Seppälä has emphasized the importance of compassion for others, balanced with self-compassion. Compassion for others may involve service and volunteering, or simply reaching out to connect, show gratitude, or draw others together.

=== Spillover ===
A person's level of subjective well-being is determined by many different factors, with social influences proving to be a strong one. Results from the famous Framingham Heart Study indicate that friends three degrees of separation away (that is, friends of friends of friends) can affect a person's happiness. From abstract: "A friend who lives within a mile (about 1.6 km) and who becomes happy increases the probability that a person is happy by 25%."

=== Indirect approaches ===
Various writers, including Camus and Tolle, have written that the act of searching or seeking for happiness is incompatible with being happy.

John Stuart Mill believed that for the great majority of people happiness is best achieved en passant, rather than striving for it directly. This meant no self-consciousness, scrutiny, self-interrogation, dwelling on, thinking about, imagining or questioning on one's happiness. Then, if otherwise fortunately circumstanced, one would "inhale happiness with the air you breathe." (Note: "The enjoyments of life (such was now my theory) are sufficient to make it a pleasant thing, when they are taken en passant, without being made a principal object. Once make them so, and they are immediately felt to be insufficient. They will not bear a scrutinizing examination. Ask yourself whether you are happy, and you cease to be so. The only chance is to treat, not happiness, but some end external to it, as the purpose of life. Let your self-consciousness, your scrutiny, your self-interrogation, exhaust themselves on that; and if otherwise fortunately circumstanced you will inhale happiness with the air you breathe, without dwelling on it or thinking about it, without either forestalling it in imagination, or putting it to flight by fatal questioning. This theory now became the basis of my philosophy of life. And I still hold to it as the best theory for all those who have but a moderate degree of sensibility and of capacity for enjoyment; that is, for the great majority of mankind.)

William Inge said that "on the whole, the happiest people seem to be those who have no particular cause for being happy except the fact that they are so." Orison Swett Marden said that "some people are born happy." (Note: "Some people are born happy. No matter what their circumstances are they are joyous, content and satisfied with everything. They carry a perpetual holiday in their eye and see joy and beauty everywhere. When we meet them they impress us as just having met with some good luck, or that they have some good news to tell you. Like the bees that extract honey from every flower, they have a happy alchemy which transmutes even gloom into sunshine.")

=== Cognitive behavioral therapy ===
Cognitive behavioral therapy is a popular therapeutic method used to change habits by changing thoughts and problematic behaviors. It focuses on emotional regulation and uses a lot of positive psychology practices. It is often used for people with depression, anxiety, or addictions and works towards how to lead a happier life. Common processes in cognitive behavioral therapy are reframing thoughts from problematic thinking patterns by replacing them with beneficial or supportive ones, roleplaying, finding beneficial coping skills, and choosing new activities that support desired behaviors and avoid negative behaviors.

=== Synthetic happiness ===
Coined by Harvard professor of psychology and author of "Stumbling on Happiness", Daniel Gilbert, synthetic happiness is the happiness each person makes for themselves. In his TED Talk the surprising science of happiness, Gilbert explains that everyone possesses a "psychological immune system" that helps regulate emotional reactions.

== Effects ==
Happiness research understands "happiness" as "life satisfaction" or "well-being". Since it has proved difficult to find a definition of happiness, individual people are instead asked how happy they feel. Numerous surveys are then summarized and analyzed using static methods. Although some researchers believe that the scales are fundamentally unsuitable for estimating happiness, other researchers argue that the happiness indices formed on the basis of the survey have a high statistical correspondence with characteristics that are generally understood to indicate a happy person. For example, individuals who report high happiness on scales smile more often, exhibit more social behavior, are more helpful, and are less likely to commit suicide. For this reason, happiness indices determined on the basis of the survey are considered reliable by happiness researchers.

A meta analysis of 2023 evaluated evidence for common happiness-boosting strategies. The study aimed to shed light on the effectiveness of these strategies and their impact on subjective well-being. As a first step, the authors analyzed numerous media articles on happiness to identify the five most commonly recommended strategies, these were: expressing gratitude, enhancing sociability, exercising, practicing mindfulness/meditation, and increasing exposure to nature. Next, the published scientific literature was searched but limited to the above-described high-quality criteria that tested the effects of these strategies on subjective well-being in everyday individuals. Only 10% of the initially retrieved studies met those rigorous criteria. The findings revealed that unlike so far suggested by scientific studies, there is currently still a lack of robust scientific evidence to support some of the most frequently suggested happiness strategies. Among the five most common happiness strategies, there was "reasonably solid evidence" of positive effects from a) Gratitude messages or lists, b) conversations with strangers or Gratitude and sociability – that is, establishing and maintaining social relationships. In contrast, no convincing evidence could be found that c) sports, d) mindfulness training, or e) walks in the countryside make people happier.

=== Positive ===
There is a wealth of cross-sectional studies on happiness and physical health that shows consistent positive relationships. Follow-up studies appear to show that happiness does not predict longevity in sick populations, but that it does predict longevity among healthy populations.

Other positive effects of happiness and being in a good mood, that have been studied and confirmed, are that happier people tend to be more helpful, attentive, and generous to others, as well as to themselves. Happy people also have been shown to act more cooperatively and less aggressively, and be more likely to help others in need. They were also found to be more sociable and communicative.

More positive effects that happiness seems to evoke are creative problem solving, persisting through challenges, more intrinsic motivation for work related or responsible tasks, and being more effective at using efficient decision-making strategies.

While some believe that success breeds happiness, Lyubomirsky, King and Diener found that happiness precedes success in income, relationships, marriages, work performance, and health.

Low mood is correlated with many negative life outcomes such as suicide, poor health, substance abuse, and low life expectancy. By extension, happiness protects from those negative outcomes.

=== Negative ===
June Gruber argued that happiness may trigger a person to be more sensitive, more gullible, less successful, and more likely to undertake high risk behaviours. She also conducted studies suggesting that seeking happiness can have negative effects, such as failure to meet over-high expectations. Iris Mauss has shown that the more people strive for happiness, the more likely they will set up too high of standards and feel disappointed. One study shows that women who value happiness more tend to react less positively to happy emotions. A 2012 study found that psychological well-being was higher for people who experienced both positive and negative emotions.

== Society and culture ==
=== Government ===
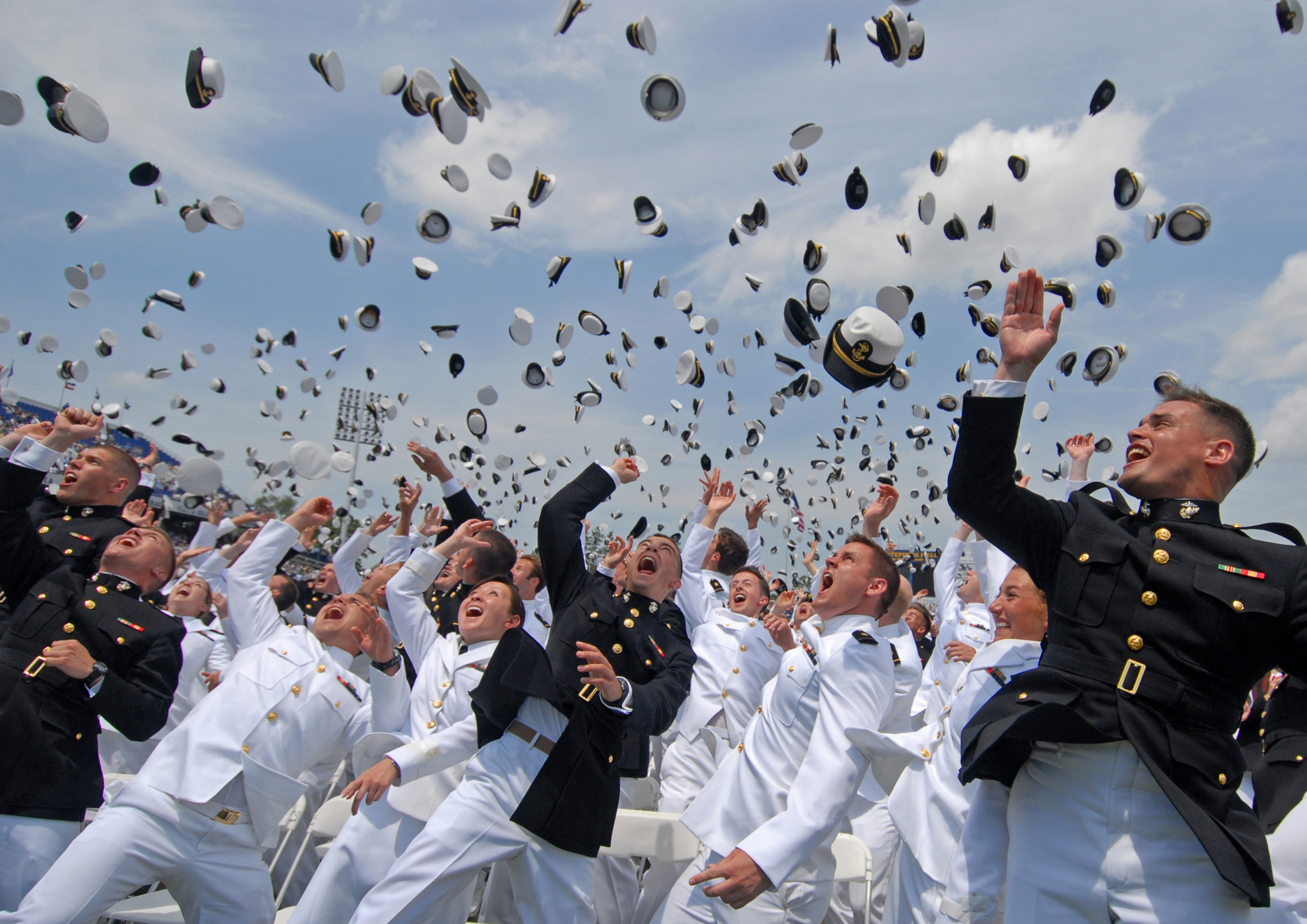
Newly commissioned officers celebrate their new positions by throwing their midshipmen covers into the air as part of the U.S. Naval Academy class of 2011 graduation and commissioning ceremony.

Jeremy Bentham believed that public policy should attempt to maximize happiness, and he even attempted to estimate a "hedonic calculus". Thomas Jefferson put the "pursuit of happiness" on the same level as life and liberty in the United States Declaration of Independence. Presently, many countries and organizations regularly measure population happiness through large-scale surveys, e.g., Bhutan.

Richer nations tend to have higher measures of happiness than poorer nations. The relationship between wealth and happiness is not linear and the same GDP increase in poor countries will have more effect on happiness than in wealthy countries.

Some political scientists argue that life satisfaction is positively related to the social democratic model of a generous social safety net, pro-worker labor market regulations, and strong labor unions. Others argue that happiness is strongly correlated with economic freedom, preferably within the context of a western mixed economy, with free press and a democracy.

=== Cultural values ===
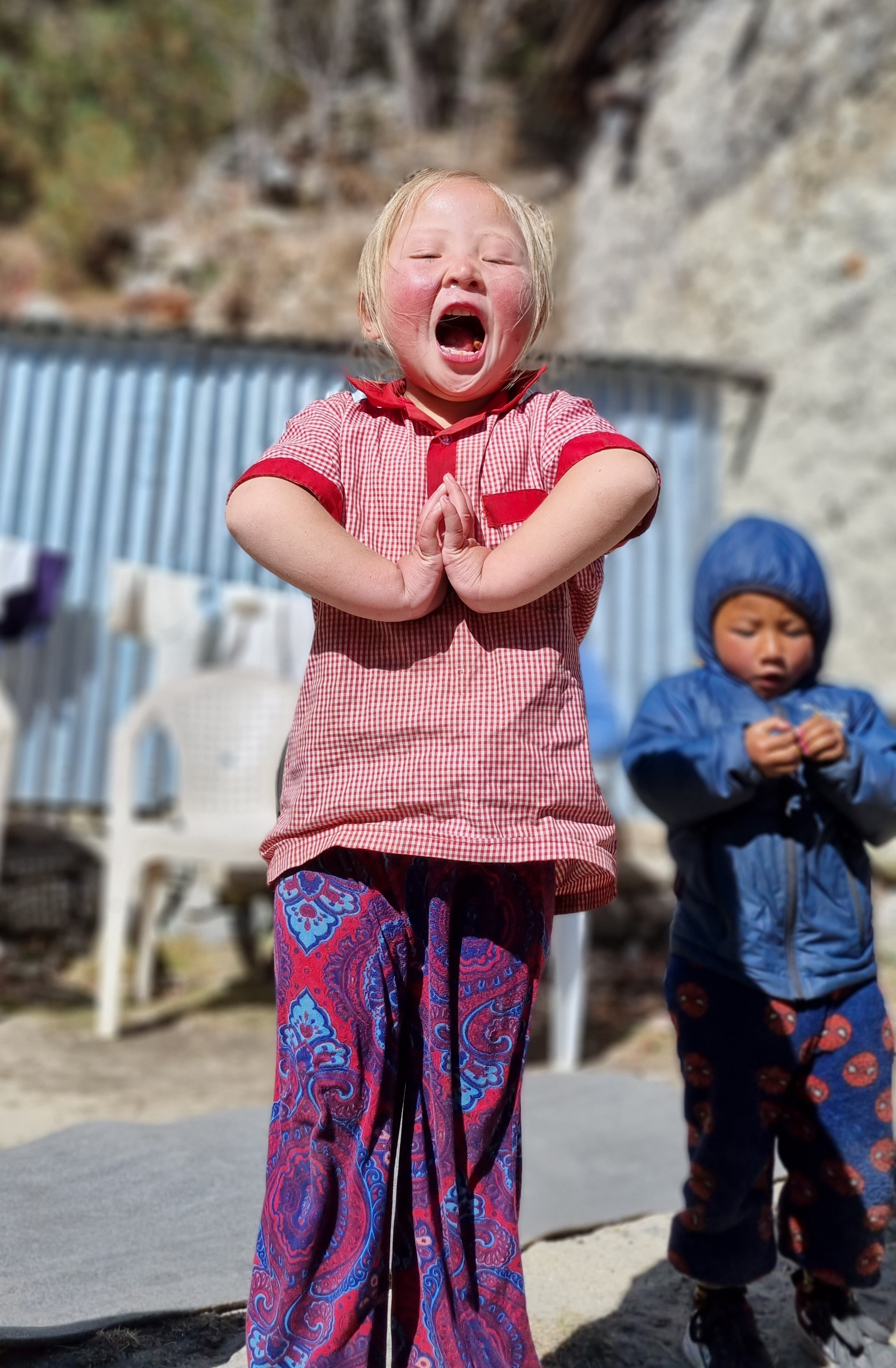
A little girl from Namche Bazaar, Nepal, expressing her happiness towards foreign visitors

Personal happiness can be affected by cultural factors. Hedonism appears to be more strongly related to happiness in more individualistic cultures. Forcing people to marry and stay married can have adverse consequences. Research has shown that unhappily married couples suffer 3–25 times the risk of developing clinical depression.

One theory is that higher SWB in richer countries is related to their more individualistic cultures. Individualistic cultures may satisfy intrinsic motivations to a higher degree than collectivistic cultures, and fulfilling intrinsic motivations, as opposed to extrinsic motivations, may relate to greater levels of happiness, leading to more happiness in individualistic cultures.

Cultural views on happiness have changed over time. For instance Western concern about childhood being a time of happiness has occurred only since the 19th century. Not all cultures seek to maximize happiness, (Note: See the work of Jeanne Tsai) (Note: See Life, Liberty and the pursuit of Happiness ref. the meaning of the US Declaration of Independence phrase) and some cultures are averse to happiness. It has been found in Western cultures that individual happiness is the most important. Some other cultures have opposite views and tend to be aversive to the idea of individual happiness. For example, people living in Eastern Asian cultures focus more on the need for happiness within relationships with others and even find personal happiness to be harmful to fulfilling happy social relationships.

=== Religion ===
People in countries with high cultural religiosity tend to relate their life satisfaction less to their emotional experiences than people in more secular countries.

==== Buddhism ====
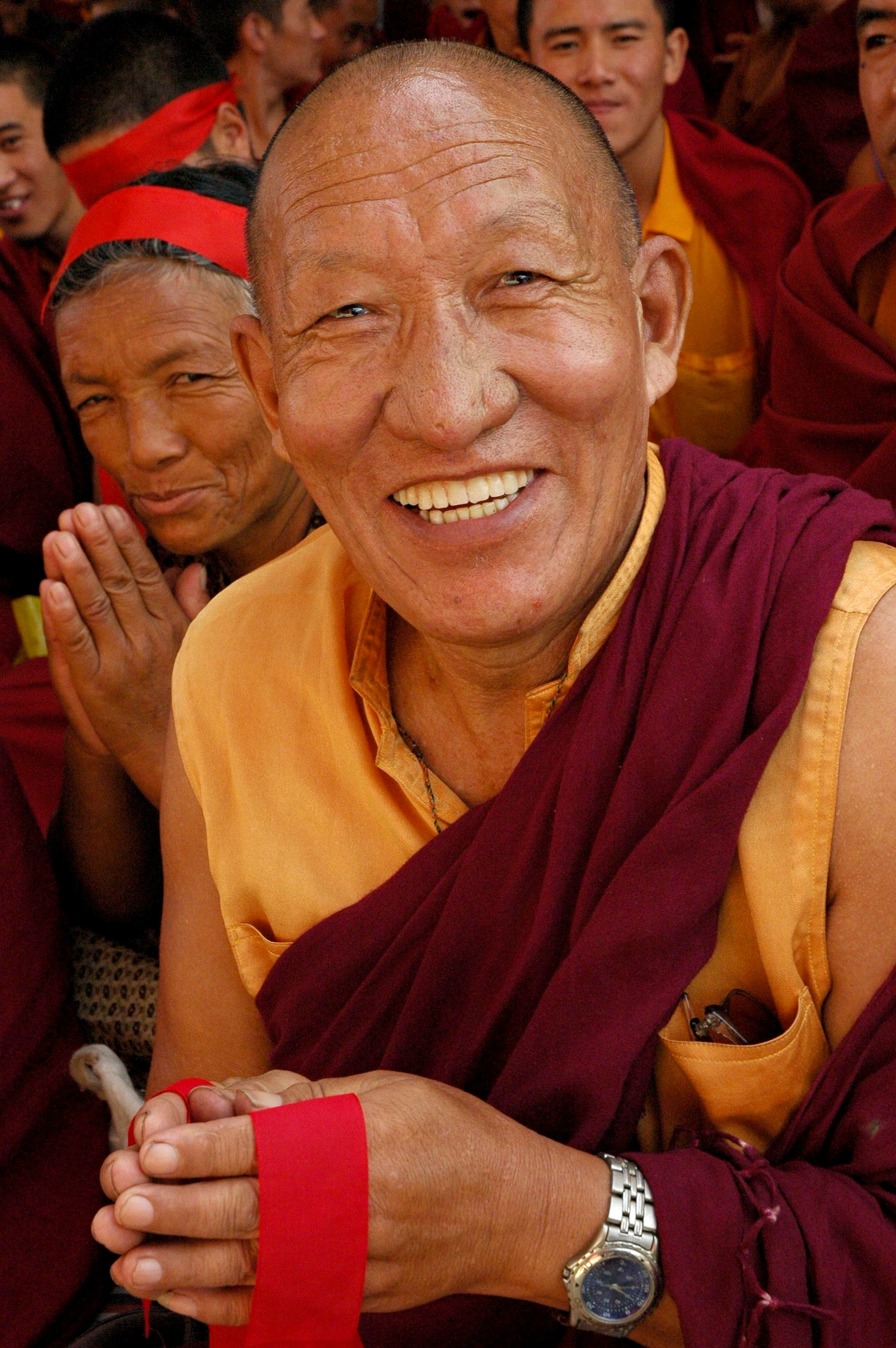
Tibetan Buddhist monk

Happiness forms a central theme of Buddhist teachings. For ultimate freedom from suffering, the Noble Eightfold Path leads its practitioner to Nirvana, a state of everlasting peace. Ultimate happiness is only achieved by overcoming craving in all forms. More mundane forms of happiness, such as acquiring wealth and maintaining good friendships, are also recognized as worthy goals for lay people (see sukha). Buddhism also encourages the generation of loving kindness and compassion, the desire for the happiness and welfare of all beings.

==== Hinduism ====
In Advaita Vedanta, the ultimate goal of life is happiness, in the sense that duality between Atman and Brahman is transcended and one realizes oneself to be the Self in all.

Patanjali, author of the Yoga Sutras, wrote exhaustively on the psychological and ontological roots of bliss.

Furthermore, the Bhagavad Gita teaches people to act without thinking of the result because attachment to results can lead to stress and aggression. However, the Gita still insists that people act to the best of their ability with full energy and skill. By focusing only on the work and the fruits of the action, people can give full concentration without letting anxiety hamper over.

==== Confucianism ====
The Chinese Confucian thinker Mencius, who had sought to give advice to ruthless political leaders during China's Warring States period, was convinced that the mind played a mediating role between the "lesser self" (the physiological self) and the "greater self" (the moral self), and that getting the priorities right between these two would lead to sage-hood. He argued that if one did not feel satisfaction or pleasure in nourishing one's "vital force" with "righteous deeds", then that force would shrivel up (Mencius, 6A:15 2A:2). More specifically, he mentions the experience of intoxicating joy if one celebrates the practice of the great virtues, especially through music.

==== Judaism ====
Happiness or simcha in Judaism is considered an important element in the service of God. A popular teaching by Rabbi Nachman of Breslov, a 19th-century Chassidic Rabbi, is "Mitzvah Gedolah Le'hiyot Besimcha Tamid," it is a great mitzvah (commandment) to always be in a state of happiness. When a person is happy they are much more capable of serving God and going about their daily activities than when depressed or upset.

==== Christianity ====
In Christianity, the ultimate end of human existence consists in felicity, Latin equivalent to the Greek eudaimonia ("blessed happiness"), described by the 13th-century philosopher-theologian Thomas Aquinas as a beatific vision of God's essence in the next life. According to Aquinas and Augustine of Hippo, man's last end is happiness: "all men agree in desiring the last end, which is happiness." Aquinas agreed with Aristotle that happiness cannot be reached solely through reasoning about consequences of acts, but also requires a pursuit of good causes for acts, such as habits according to virtue.

According to Aquinas, happiness consists in an "operation of the speculative intellect": "Consequently happiness consists principally in such an operation, viz. in the contemplation of Divine things." And, "the last end cannot consist in the active life, which pertains to the practical intellect." So:

Therefore the last and perfect happiness, which we await in the life to come, consists entirely in contemplation. But imperfect happiness, such as can be had here, consists first and principally in contemplation, but secondarily, in an operation of the practical intellect directing human actions and passions.

Human complexities, like reason and cognition, can produce well-being or happiness, but such form is limited and transitory. In temporal life, the contemplation of God, the infinitely Beautiful, is the supreme delight of the will. Beatitudo, or perfect happiness, as complete well-being, is to be attained not in this life, but the next.

==== Islam ====
Al-Ghazali, the Sufi thinker, wrote that "The Alchemy of Happiness" is a manual of religious instruction that is used throughout the Muslim world and widely practiced today.

Furthermore, in some Sufi traditions, rituals involving devotional songs (quavvāli) are performed to arouse mystical love and bring participants closer to God. Joyce Flueckiger, in her book called In Amma's Healing Room, explains that a participant says that happiness is born from the poetry.

== Philosophy ==
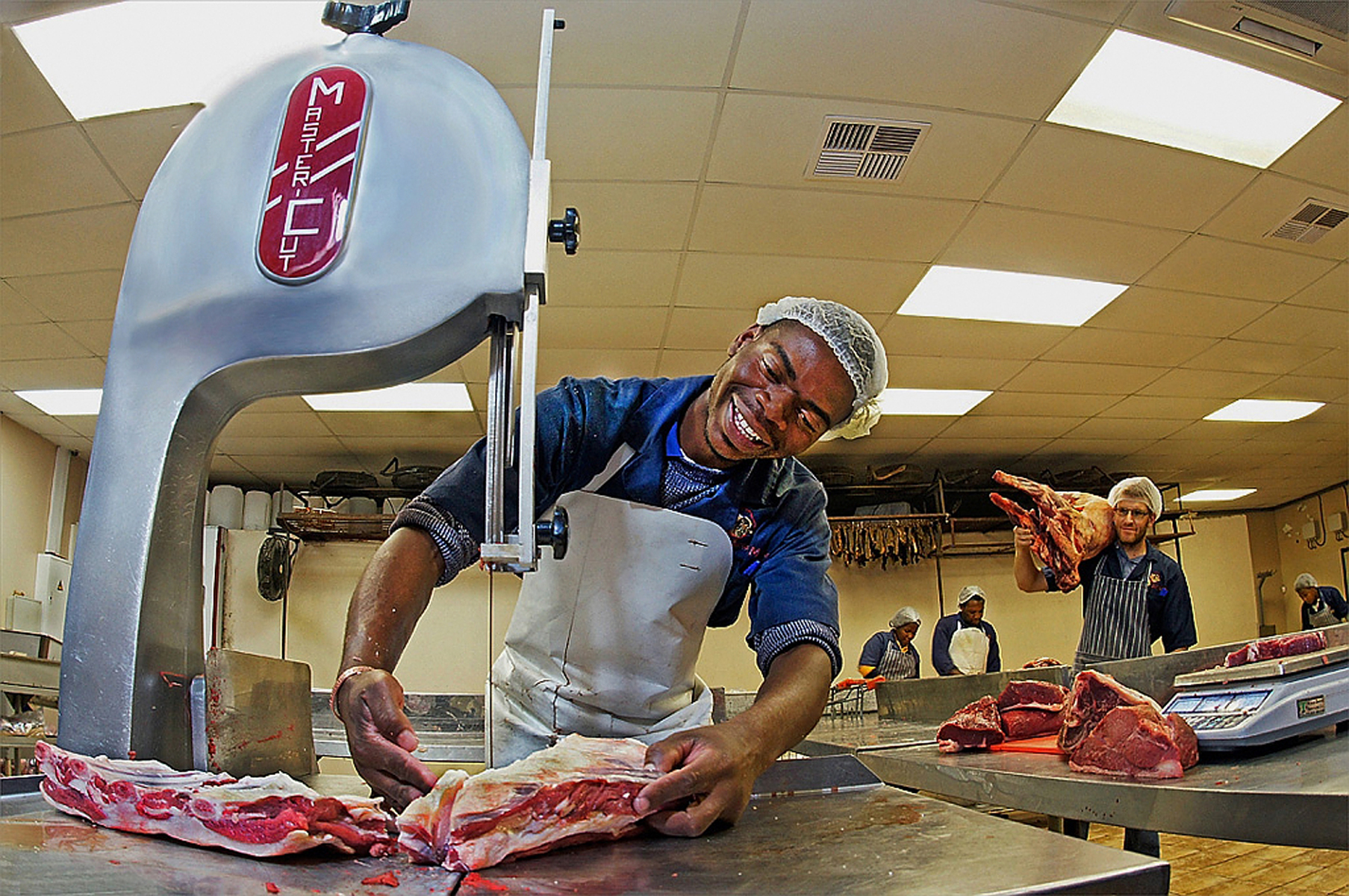
A smiling butcher slicing meat

=== Relation to morality ===
Philosophy of happiness is often discussed in conjunction with ethics. Traditional European societies, inherited from the Greeks and from Christianity, often linked happiness with morality. In this context, morality was the performance in a specific role in a certain kind of social life.

Happiness remains a difficult term for moral philosophy. Throughout the history of moral philosophy, there has been an oscillation between attempts to define morality in terms of consequences leading to happiness or defining it as nothing to do with happiness at all.

In psychology, connections between happiness and morality have been studied in a variety of ways. Empirical research suggests that laypeople's judgments of a person's happiness in part depend on perceptions of that person's morality, suggesting that judgments of others' happiness involve moral evaluation. A large body of research also suggests that engaging in prosocial behavior can increase happiness.

=== Ethics ===
Ethicists have made arguments for how humans should behave, either individually or collectively, based on the resulting happiness of such behavior. Utilitarians, such as John Stuart Mill and Jeremy Bentham, advocated the greatest happiness principle as a guide for ethical behavior. This principle states that actions are proportionately right or wrong by how much happiness or unhappiness they bring. Mill defines happiness as that which brings about an intended pleasure and avoids an unnecessary pain, and he defines unhappiness as the reverse, namely an action that brings about pain and not pleasure. He is quick to specify that pleasure and pain are to be understood in an Epicurean light, referring chiefly to the higher human pleasures of increased intellect, feelings, and moral sentiments not what one might call beastly pleasures of mere animal appetites. Critics of this view include Thomas Carlyle, Ferdinand Tönnies and others within the German philosophical tradition. They posit that a greater happiness is to be found in choosing to suffer for others, rather than allowing others to suffer for them, declaring this to be a form of satisfying, and heroic, nobility.

Many studies have observed the effects of volunteerism (as a form of altruism) on happiness and health and have consistently found that those who exhibit volunteerism also have better current and future health and well-being. In a study of older adults, those who volunteered had higher life satisfaction and will to live, and less depression, anxiety, and somatization. Volunteerism and helping behavior have not only been shown to improve mental health but physical health and longevity as well, attributable to the activity and social integration it encourages. One study examined the physical health of mothers who volunteered over 30 years and found that 52% of those who did not belong to a volunteer organization experienced a major illness while only 36% of those who did volunteer experienced one. A study on adults aged 55 and older found that during the four-year study period, people who volunteered for two or more organizations had a 63% lower likelihood of dying. After controlling for prior health status, it was determined that volunteerism accounted for a 44% reduction in mortality.

=== Aristotle ===
Aristotle described eudaimonia (Greek: εὐδαιμονία) as the goal of human thought and action. Eudaimonia is often translated to mean happiness, but some scholars contend that "human flourishing" may be a more accurate translation. Aristotle's use of the term in Nicomachiean Ethics extends beyond the general sense of happiness.

In the Nicomachean Ethics, written in 350 BCE, Aristotle stated that happiness (also being well and doing well) is the only thing that humans desire for their own sake, unlike riches, honour, health or friendship. He observed that men sought riches, or honour, or health not only for their own sake but also in order to be happy. For Aristotle the term eudaimonia, which is translated as 'happiness' or 'flourishing' is an activity rather than an emotion or a state. Eudaimonia (Greek: εὐδαιμονία) is a classical Greek word consists of the word "eu" ("good" or "well-being") and "daimōn" ("spirit" or "minor deity", used by extension to mean one's lot or fortune). Thus understood, the happy life is the good life, that is, a life in which a person fulfills human nature in an excellent way.

Specifically, Aristotle argued that the good life is the life of excellent rational activity. He arrived at this conclusion with the "Function Argument". Basically, if it is right, every living thing has a function, that which it uniquely does. For Aristotle human function is to reason, since it is that alone which humans uniquely do. And performing one's function well, or excellently, is good. According to Aristotle, the life of excellent rational activity is the happy life.

The key question Aristotle seeks to answer is "What is the ultimate purpose of human existence?" A lot of people are seeking pleasure, health, and a good reputation. It is true that those have a value, but none of them can occupy the place of the greatest good for which humanity aims. It may seem like all goods are a means to obtain happiness, but Aristotle said that happiness is always an end in itself.

=== Nietzsche ===
Friedrich Nietzsche critiqued the English Utilitarians' focus on attaining the greatest happiness, stating that "Man does not strive for happiness, only the Englishman does". Nietzsche meant that making happiness one's ultimate goal and the aim of one's existence, in his words "makes one contemptible." Nietzsche instead yearned for a culture that would set higher, more difficult goals than "mere happiness." He introduced the quasi-dystopic figure of the "last man" as a kind of thought experiment against the utilitarians and happiness-seekers.

These small, "last men" who seek after only their own pleasure and health, avoiding all danger, exertion, difficulty, challenge, struggle are meant to seem contemptible to Nietzsche's reader. Nietzsche instead wants us to consider the value of what is difficult, what can only be earned through struggle, difficulty, pain and thus to come to see the affirmative value suffering and unhappiness truly play in creating everything of great worth in life, including all the highest achievements of human culture, not least of all philosophy.

== See also ==
- Aversion to happiness
- Brain stimulation reward
- Euphoria
- Extraversion, introversion and happiness
- Happiness economics
- Hedonic treadmill
- Joy
- Pleasure
- Smiling

== Sources ==
- Seligman, Martin E. P.; Csikszentmihalyi, Mihaly (2000). "Positive Psychology: An Introduction". American Psychologist. 55 (1): 5–14. doi:10.1037/0003-066x.55.1.5. PMID 11392865.
