= Grube (disambiguation) =

Grube may refer to:

- Grube, a municipality in Schleswig-Holstein, Germany
- German name of Fouchy, a commune in Alsace, France
- Grube (Weser), a river of North Rhine-Westphalia, Germany
- Grube (Wismar), a river of Mecklenburg-Vorpommern, Germany
- Grube (surname)
