= June Gruber =

American clinical psychologist

- Occupations: Professor of Psychology and Neuroscience
- Awards: APS Rising Star Award (2011); APS Janet Taylor Spence Award for Transformative Early Career Contributions (2016); SRP Early Career Award (2012); Yale University Arthur Greer Memorial Prize for Outstanding Junior Faculty (2012); NARSAD Young Investigator Award (2014); NARSAD Young Investigator Award (2019)

Academic background
- Education: University of California, Berkeley

June Gruber is an American psychologist. She is a professor of psychology and neuroscience and director of the Positive Emotion and Psychopathology Laboratory at the University of Colorado Boulder. She is known for her research on positive affectivity and mental health. She is a licensed clinical psychologist.

Gruber has authored over 150 articles and chapters on mental health and positive emotion, with a focus on bipolar and related mood disorders. She is editor of the Oxford Handbook of Positive Emotion and Psychopathology and co-editor (with Judith Tedlie Moskowitz) of Positive Emotion: Integrating the Light Sides and Dark Sides. She has co-authored several leading psychology textbooks including Psychology (2024) and Exploring Psychology (2025).

Gruber's research has been recognized by several awards, including the 2011 Association for Psychological Science (APS) Rising Star Award and the 2016 APS Janet Taylor Spence Award for Transformative Early Career Contributions. Gruber also received Yale University's Arthur Greer Memorial Prize for Outstanding Scholarly Publication or Research, awarded to "a junior faculty member in the natural or social sciences."

Gruber is the current editor-in-chief at Current Directions in Psychological Science, and previously served as an associate editor at several prominent journals, including Perspectives in Psychological Science and Emotion.

== Early life and education ==
Gruber was raised in Half Moon Bay, California, where she attended Half Moon Bay High School and graduated as class co-valedictorian in 1999. She attended the University of California, Berkeley as a Regents' and Chancellor's Scholar, where in 2003 she completed her B.A. in psychology with highest distinction in general scholarship and high honors in psychology and was a Haas Undergraduate Research Fellow.

Gruber completed her M.A. (2005) and Ph.D. (2009) in Psychology also at UC Berkeley. As a graduate student she worked with Ann Kring, Sheri Johnson, and Dacher Keltner. Her dissertation was supervised by Allison Harvey.

== Academic career ==
Gruber joined the Department of Psychology at Yale University as an assistant professor in 2009, where she was director of the Yale Positive Emotion and Psychopathology lab. At Yale she was awarded Arthur Greer Memorial Prize for Outstanding Junior Faculty for her research on the potentially negative consequences of positive emotion. In 2014 she moved to Department of Psychology and Neuroscience at the University of Colorado Boulder, and is a professor in the clinical science area.

=== Research areas ===
==== Negative impacts of positive emotions: Psychopathology and bipolar disorder ====
Gruber conducts experimental research and articulates theoretical models on the ways different types of positive emotions impact well-being and health, with a special focus on negative aspects. Positive emotions may provide the basis for dysfunction and suboptimal outcomes. This area of research is sometimes known as "positive emotion disturbance". Gruber has noted that exposure to patients diagnosed with bipolar disorder inspired her to study potential negative consequences of heightened euphoria during mania.

==== Happiness ====
According to Gruber, research supports that happiness is "not one single thing," but is composed of "feelings, thoughts, behaviors and even the way our body responds." She notes that there's evidence supporting that direct focus on achieving happiness can backfire; "people report feeling less happy the more they try to pursue it." Such evidence suggests not to “focus on the pursuit of happiness", but to "focus on other people, things you’re grateful for and doing things for others as opposed [for] yourself.”

Gruber has conducted studies suggesting that seeking happiness can have negative effects, such as failure to meet over-high expectations. She has collaborated with Iris Mauss, whose research has similarly shown that the more people strive for happiness, the more likely they will set up too high of standards and feel disappointed.

Gruber has argued that happiness conceived of merely in terms of positive affect can have negative effects. It may trigger a person to be more sensitive, more gullible, less successful, and more likely to undertake high risk behaviours.

=== Recognitions and awards ===
Gruber's research has been recognized by several awards including the 2011 Association for Psychological Science’s Rising Star Award, the 2016 Association for Psychological Science’s Janet Taylor Spence Award for Transformative Early Career Contributions, the 2012 Society for Research in Psychopathology's Early Career Award, and two NARSAD Young Investigator Awards in 2014 and 2019 from the Brain & Behavior Research Foundation.

=== Other activities ===
Gruber has taught courses on emotion, happiness, and psychopathology. Her teaching has been recognized by several awards, including the 2024 President's Teaching Scholar, 2023 Cogswell Award for Inspirational Instruction, 2022 Boulder Faculty Assembly Excellence in Teaching and Pedagogy Award, and 2020 UROP Outstanding Faculty Mentor Award.

Gruber is engaged in science outreach and distribution of the science of emotions and mental health for the broader public. She has authored popular pieces for media such as Slate (magazine) and Scientific American. She developed a #TalkMentalIllness campaign, an Experts in Emotion Interview Series at Yale University, and a free online course in Human Emotion available through YouTube and iTunes. She has given a TEDx talk on the “dark side” of happiness. She has written on the mental health crisis sparked by the COVID-19 pandemic.

Gruber is involved in mentoring new generations of scientists and the advancement of women and underrepresented minorities in science. She is co-author of a monthly column for young scientists in Science Careers, received an IMPART grant to co-lead a workshop on the advancement of underrepresented populations in the science, and has written on the future of women in psychological research.

Gruber has joined David Myers and Nathan DeWall as co-author of a world best-selling introductory psychology textbook.
