= Grube (surname) =

Grube is a German surname. It may originate as a nickname for a person after his dwelling place from Middle High German gruobe, Middle Low German grōve 'pit, quarry', or after a settlement named Grube. Notable people with the surname include:

- Adolph Eduard Grube (1812–1880), Polish zoologist
- Bruce Grube, 11th president of Georgia Southern University
- Charles Grube (1904–1976), American football player
- Chris Grube (born 1985), British sailor
- Christian Grube (born 1934), German conductor
- Ernst J. Grube (1932−2011), German historian of Islamic art and curator at the Metropolitan Museum of Art
- Falko Grube (born 1977), German politician
- Frank Grube (1905–1945), American baseball player
- Franklin Grube (1831−1869), American physician and politician
- George Grube (1899–1982), classicist
- Henry Grube (died 1582), English politician
- Janice Grube, (born 1971), American singer-songwriter
- Jarrett Grube (born 1981), American baseball player
- Luisa Grube (born 2001), German paraclimber
- Nikolai Grube, (born 1962), German epigrapher
- Rüdiger Grube (born 1951), engineer
- Wilfried Grube (born 1923), German former field hockey player
- Wilhelm Grube (1855–1908), German ethnographer

== See also ==
- Gruber
