= Grub Street (disambiguation) =

Grub Street is a street in London's Moorfields district, and one-time home to impoverished "hack writers".

Grub Street may also refer to:

- Grub Street (literary magazine), a magazine from Towson University, Maryland, U.S.
- Grub Street, Staffordshire, a settlement in Staffordshire, England
- Grub Street (website), an online food news outlet of New York magazine
- Grub Street Productions, an American TV production company
- GrubStreet, a writer's workshop in Boston, Massachusetts

== See also ==
- New Grub Street, a novel by George Gissing
- Grubb Street (disambiguation)
