= William Gruber =

William Gruber may refer to:

- William H. Gruber (born 1935), American organizational theorist
- William R. Gruber (1890–1979), United States Army general
- William C. Gruber, American physician-scientist, pediatrician, and business executive
- William B. Gruber (1903-1965), German-American organ maker and inventor of the View-Master
