= Michael Gruber =

Michael Gruber may refer to:

- Michael Gruber (author) (born 1940), American novelist
- Michael Gruber (actor) (born 1964), American actor
- Michael Gruber (artist) (born 1965), German artist
- Michael Gruber (skier) (born 1979), Austrian Nordic Combined skier
