= Sheri Johnson =

American psychologist

Sheri L. Johnson
- Education: University of Pittsburgh; Salem College
- Scientific career
- Workplaces: University of California, Berkeley; Brown University; University of Miami
- Thesis: Recognition of inconsistent communication (1986)

Sheri L. Johnson is an American psychologist who is Distinguished Professor and Chancellor's Professor at the University of California, Berkeley. She is known for her work on bipolar disorder, particularly the psychological mechanisms that predict the onset and escalation of mania. She was elected Fellow of the Association for Behavioral and Cognitive Therapies and American Association for the Advancement of Science.

== Early life and education ==
Johnson was an undergraduate student at Salem College. She moved to the University of Pittsburgh for her doctoral research, where she studied inconsistent communication. She was a postdoctoral fellow at Brown University, where she was appointed assistant professor in 1993.

== Research and career ==
In 1995, Johnson joined the University of Miami where she taught psychology. Her research aims to identify factors that predict depression and mania. Her studies on mania have explored reward sensitivity and goal engagement, demonstrating that both increase in individuals with bipolar disorder. She has also investigated impulsivity and its occurrence during intense emotional states, revealing that emotion-related impulsivity is linked to various pathologies, including aggression and suicide. She was appointed Professor of Psychology at the University of California, Berkeley in 2008, promoted to Distinguished Professor in 2021 and Chancellor's Professor in 2022.

Johnson develops novel interventions for people with bipolar disorder. She worked with the Wellcome Trust to investigate the role of healthy lifestyles in bipolar disorder, based on the observation that physical health is a predictor for bipolar outcomes.

== Awards and honors ==
- 2010 Elected Fellow of the Association for Psychological Science
- 2013 Elected Fellow of the Center for Advanced Study in the Behavioral Sciences
- 2015 Elected Fellow of the Association for Behavioral and Cognitive Therapies
- 2015 President of the Society for Research in Psychopathology
- 2022 Elected Fellow of the American Association for the Advancement of Science

== Selected publications ==
- Sheri L. Johnson; R. Jay Turner; Noboru Iwata (2003). "BIS/BAS Levels and Psychiatric Disorder: An Epidemiological Study". Journal of Psychopathology and Behavioral Assessment. 25 (1): 25–36. doi:10.1023/a:1022247919288. ISSN 0882-2689. Wikidata Q60622658.
- Greg C Feldman; Jutta Joormann; Sheri L Johnson (1 August 2008). "Responses to Positive Affect: A Self-Report Measure of Rumination and Dampening". Cognitive Therapy and Research. 32 (4): 507–525. doi:10.1007/s10608-006-9083-0. ISSN 0147-5916. PMC 2847784. PMID 20360998. Wikidata Q30980238.
- Charles S Carver; Sheri L Johnson; Jutta Joormann (1 November 2008). "Serotonergic function, two-mode models of self-regulation, and vulnerability to depression: what depression has in common with impulsive aggression". Psychological Bulletin. 134 (6): 912–943. doi:10.1037/a0013740. ISSN 0033-2909. PMC 2847478. PMID 18954161. Wikidata Q30482466.
