= Grubbs =

Grubbs may refer to:

== People ==
- Grubbs (surname)

== In fiction ==
- Grubbs Grady, a main character in The Demonata series of novels
- Verla Grubbs, a character in the All My Children TV series

== Other uses ==
- Grubbs catalyst, a series of transition metal carbene complexes used as catalysts for olefin metathesis
- Grubbs's test for outliers, a statistical test used to detect outliers
- Grubb's Tramway (Mowbray), a tramway in northern Tasmania
- Grubb's Tramway (Zeehan), a tramway in western Tasmania
- Grubbs, Arkansas
- Grubbs Corner, West Virginia
- United States v. Grubbs, a 2006 United States Supreme Court case

== See also ==
- Grubb (disambiguation)
