= Grub =

Grub may refer to:

== Places ==
=== Germany ===
- Grub (Amerang), a hamlet in Bavaria, Germany
- Grub am Forst, a town in the district of Coburg in Bavaria, Germany
- Grub, Thuringia, a municipality in the district of Hildburghausen in Thuringia, Germany

=== Switzerland ===
- Grub, Appenzell Ausserrhoden, Switzerland
- Grub, St. Gallen, Switzerland

== Science and technology ==
- GNU GRUB, the GNU project's bootloader software
- Grub (larva), the larval or caterpillar stage of several insects
- Grub (search engine), a distributed search crawler platform
- Headless set screw, a British term

== Other uses ==
- Grubs, characters in Buzz Lightyear of Star Command, an American television series

== See also ==
- Grub Street, the former name of a London street, which became a metonym for hack writers
- Grubb
- Grubbs (disambiguation)
- Grube
