= Grubbs (surname) =

Grubbs is a surname. Notable people with the surname include:

- Ben Grubbs (1984–), an American football guard
- Daniel W. Grubbs (1835–1917), an American lawyer, businessman, and politician
- David Grubbs (1967–), a musician
- Gary Grubbs (1949–), an American actor
- Robert H. Grubbs (1942–2021), an American chemist and Nobel laureate
- Todd Grubbs, an American musician
- Tom Grubbs (1894–1986), an American baseball pitcher
- Victor Grubbs, captain of one of the aircraft involved in the Tenerife airport disaster
