= Empfangshalle =

German performing arts duo

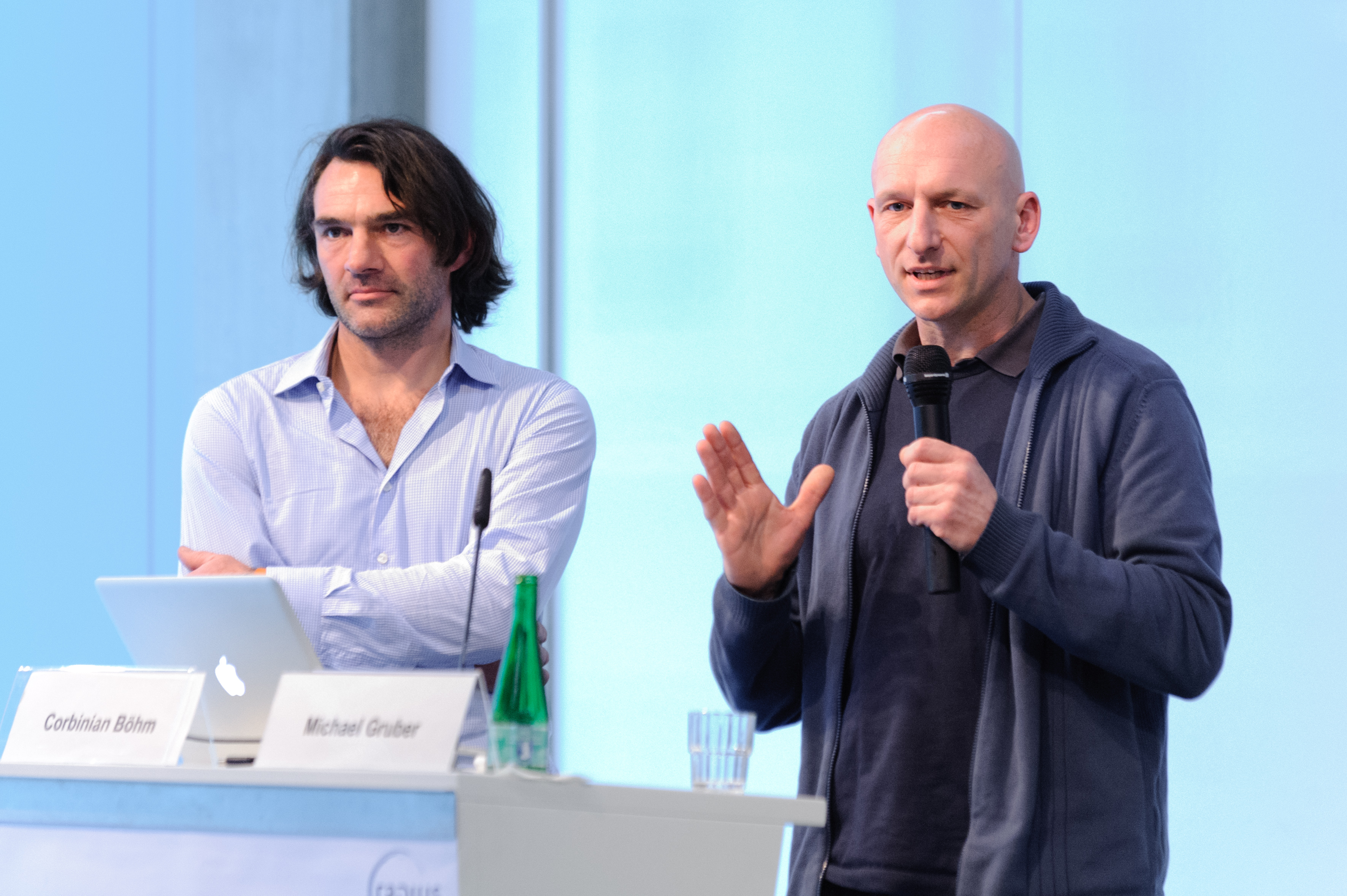
"Empfangshalle" (Corbinian Böhm and Michael Gruber)

Empfangshalle (literally lobby) is the name of a German performing art duo. It was founded by Corbinian Böhm and Michael Gruber in Munich (Germany) in 1995.

Medium of their works is the society. They perform their art projects in the open, especially in popular places. Their art projects - more often than not - are a mystery to the viewers and often cause confusion. A typical example was the staged "Gei hin hol" [gei: hi:n ho:l] mega-poster action with incomprehensible foreign language messages in Munich (2005).

== Exhibitions and projects ==
(listed in chronological order)

- 1998:
  - "Pagine per la Libertà", Pisa, Italy
  - "Sag lächelnd Good Bye" (say good bye with a smile), Old North Cemetery of Munich, Germany
  - Skulpturenprojekt (project with sculptures), Alentejo, Portugal
- 1999:
  - "Play", Old North Cemetery of Munich, Germany
- 2000:
  - "Drei-Sekunden" (three seconds), on the ramp in front of the Empfangshalle studio, Munich, Germany
  - "Empfangshalle macht sich ein Bild" (Empfangshalle gets an impression), Haus der Kunst, Munich, Germany
  - "Himmelfahrt" (ascension), Diocesan Museum, Freising, Germany
  - "Laden und Löschen" (loading and deleting), Piazza, Munich literary house, Germany
  - "Move me", subway entrances in Munich, Nuremberg and Berlin, Germany
  - "Open Art", Maximiliansforum, Munich, Germany
  - "Qualitätswochen" (quality weeks), state art gallery of Baden-Baden, Germany
- 2001:
  - "Bitte melde Dich" (please call back ...), Brooklyn Bridge, New York City
  - "Loch" (hole), joint project with Haubitz&Zoche
  - "Kabûl Salonu", Istanbul, Turkey
- 2002:
  - "Auf kürzestem Weg" (taking the shortest way possible), artists’ gallery ('Galerie der Künstler'), Munich, Germany
  - "Auftraggeber mit Öffentlichkeit" (customer with public), Munich, Germany
  - "Gelsenlos" (Gelsen(kirchen) lottery ticket)", Overtures, Gelsenkirchen, Germany
- 2003:
  - "Cape of Good Hope", an art project in public space, Kuopio, Finland
  - "Woher Kollege Wohin Kollege" (buddy, where do you come from, where are you going), an art project in public space, Munich, Germany
  - Werkschau (exhibition of works), Kunsthaus Raskolnikow, Dresden, Germany
- 2004:
  - premiere of "Woher Kollege Wohin Kollege" buddy, where do you come from, where are you going), a documentary film of the same name as the art project, municipal museum, Munich, Germany
  - "Brot und Butter" (bread and butter), municipal gallery in the Höhmannhaus, Augsburg, Germany
  - "Schichtwechsel" (change of shift), hall 13, cotton spinning-mill ('Baumwollspinnerei'), Leipzig, Germany
- 2005:
  - "Gei hin hol", [gei: hi:n ho:l], an art project in public space with mega-posters, Munich, Germany
  - "Ein Kreuz für das 21. Jahrhundert" (a cross for the 21st century), diocesan museum, Freising, Germany
  - "Willkommen in Leipzig" (welcome to Leipzig), together with Medium Green ('zwischengrün'), art association of Leipzig, Germany
  - "Klopstockstr. Haus 6" (Klopstock street No 6), Petulapark, Munich, Germany
- 2006:
  - "Eröffnungsausstellung H2 - Zentrum für Gegenwartskunst" (opening exhibition H2), Augsburg, Germany
  - "as if we were alone", 'Ars Electronica', Linz, Austria (August 31 – September 5)
  - "Klopstockstr. Haus 6", Petulapark Munich
  - "Image Flux: China, Guangzhou
  - "as if we were alone", Filmfest München
- 2007:
  - "Mobile journey", 52nd Venice Biennale
  - Fototriennale, Esslingen
  - "Woher Kollege wohin Kollege", "urban stories", Berlin
- 2008:
  - "Camp Berlin", Berlin
  - "Werkschau", Kunsthaus Raskolnikow, and public space in Dresden
  - "Paradoxien des Öffentlichen", Wilhelm Lehmbruck Museum, Duisburg
  - "seesaw", Dina4, studio, Berlin
  - "3+2=4" DG Deutsche Gesellschaft für christliche Kunst, Munich
  - "Golden Gate" Kunst am Bau project, Neues Schulzentrum, Fürstenfeldbruck
  - "Seaplay" China Cup, installation work on the beach, Shenzhen
  - "Wanderarbeiter" Shenzhen, video work and performance along with workers
- 2009:
  - "Art on Site" NCCA Moskau and Goethe-Institut, Kaliningrad, Russia
  - "Beauty and the beast" 3rd Moscow Biennale, Russia
  - "Kunst zur Arbeit" Opelvillen, Rüsselsheim
  - "The Benjamin Project" Gallery Diet, Miami, United States
  - "Paradiso" Diocesan Museum, Freising, Germany
  - "Wanderarbeiter" Shenzhen, video work and performance with workers
- 2010:
  - "The Benjamin Project", single exhibition, He Xiangning Art Museum, Shenzhen, China
- 2011:
  - "Hinterm Horizont", realization of the "Kunst am Bau" concept for the Justizvollzugsanstalt Heidering, Berlin, Germany
  - "taggen" at the KIOSK FRee, Sendlinger Tor, Munich, Germany
  - "Isar Peak", within the scope of "transformations", Galerie Kampl, Munich, Germany
- 2012:
  - "arabian countdown", temporary work in the Rotunda of the Pinakothek der Moderne, Munich, Germany

== Awards and nominations ==
- 1999: Kestler-Häusler-Stiftung sponsorship award
- 2001:
  - Erwin-und-Gisela-von-Steiner-Stiftung scholarship
  - 1st, "Kunst am Bau" competition, Munich East work yard planning
- 2002: Debutant of the Bundesverband Bildender Künstlerinnen und Künstler, Munich, and of Bavaria
- 2003: Art prize of the Fürstenfeldbruck district
- 2004: Young CIVIS media prize nomination of the "Woher Kollege Wohin Kollege" film, Vienna
- 2006: "der hausderkunst preis", Haus der Kunst art prize, Munich
- 2008: Erwin-und-Gisela-von-Steiner-Stiftung scholarship for the "Benjamin project"
