= Michael Gruber (artist) =

German painter, installation artist, and sculptor

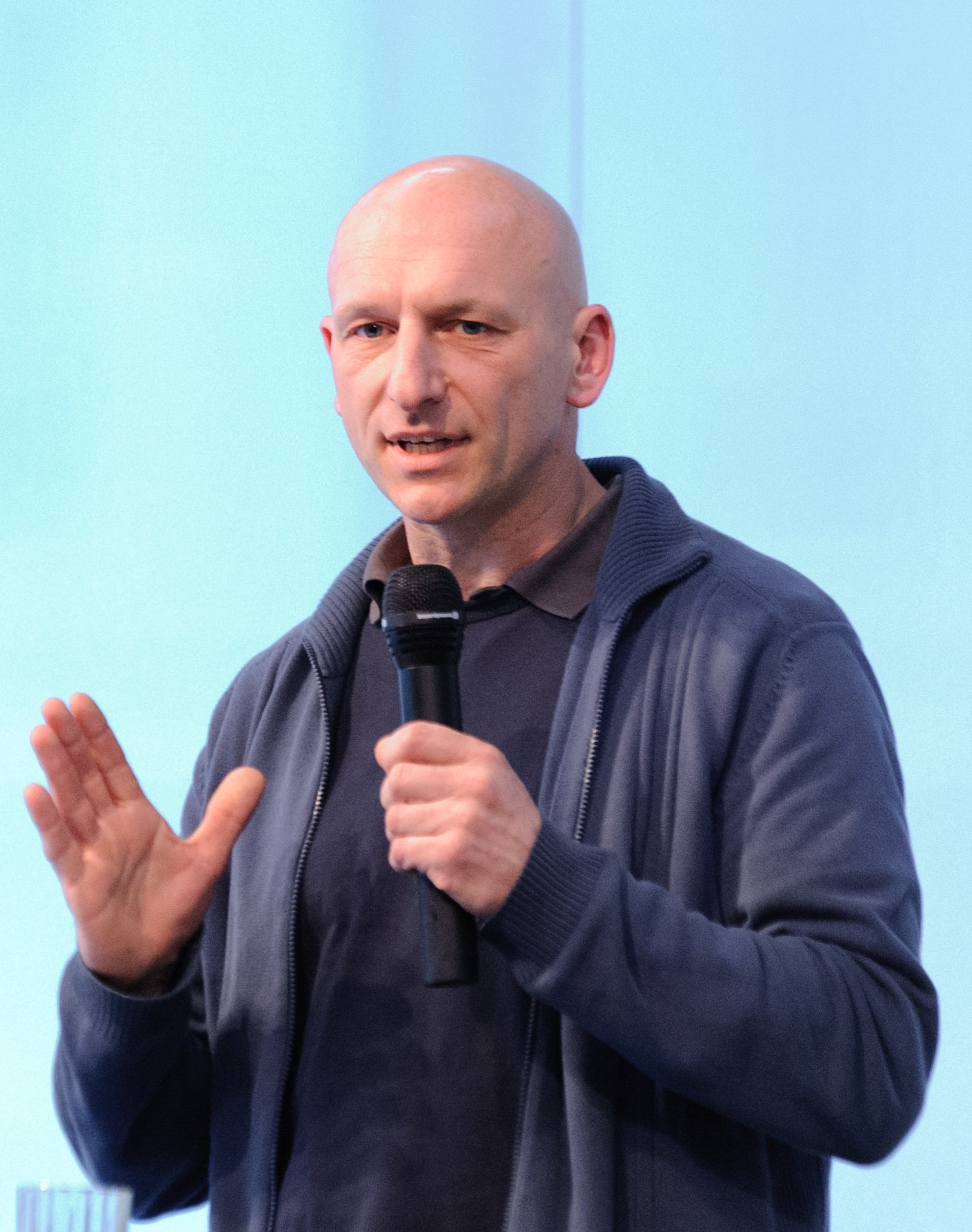
- Michael Gruber (2012)
- Born: 1965 (age 60–61); Mallersdorf, Germany
- Education: Academy of Fine Arts, Munich
- Known for: Painting, Drawing, Sculpture, Installation art

Michael Gruber (born 1965 in Mallersdorf, Germany) is a German painter, installation artist and sculptor.

== Biography ==
After graduating from an apprenticeship as sculptor he majored in sculpture at the Academy of Fine Arts, Munich. He was taught there by Hans Ladner, Antony Gormley, Asta Gröting and Timm Ulrichs.

Since 1995 he has worked in Munich with his partner Corbinian Böhm under the name Empfangshalle.

In 1999 he got his "Meisterschüler" diplom (comparable with a Master of Fine Arts degree).

== See also ==
- List of German painters
