= Franz Gruber =

Franz Gruber may refer to:

- Franz Xaver Gruber (1787–1863), Austrian composer, organist, and creator of the Christmas carol Silent Night
- Franz Gruber (actor) (born 1930), American actor
- Franz Gruber (alpine skier) (born 1959), Austrian alpine skier
- Franz Gruber (tenor), German opera singer
