= Gerold Gruber =

Gerold W. Gruber
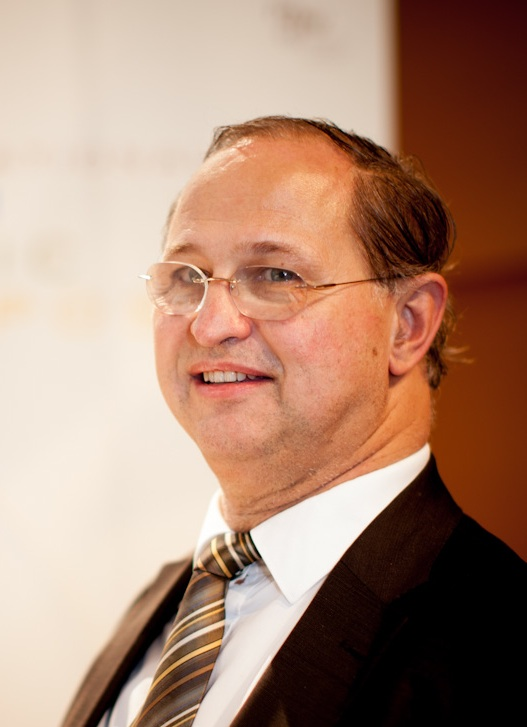
- Gerold Gruber, 2014
- Born: 6 September 1958 (age 68); Vienna, Austria
- Education: musicology
- Alma mater: University of Vienna
- Occupation: Professor
- Employer: University of Music and Performing Arts
- Title: Univ.Prof. Dr. phil. Dr.h.c.
- Board member of: Music Analysis and Exile Documentation Research Center

Gerold W. Gruber (born September 6, 1958) is an Austrian musicologist, professor at the Institute for Musicology and Interpretation Research at the mdw - University for Music and Performing Arts Vienna, and head of the exil.arte Center for Banned Music at the mdw.

== Life ==
Gerold Gruber earned Ph.D degree in Musicology at the University of Vienna and studied Pantomime with Samy Molcho. He was an active research scholar member of the Anton Bruckner Institute Linz (ABIL), the Commission for Musical Research (Austrian Academy of Science), the Herbert-von-Karajan-Foundation (on Music Perception), and others. In 2014 he received an Honorary degree from the Academy of Performing Arts in Bratislava.

== Musicology and scientific research ==
Gruber served as a lecturer of Music Theory at the Institute of European Studies (IES abroad) since 1991. He was vice head of the Ph.D Curricula Commission at the University for Music and Performing Arts Vienna, which he coordinated to create the Ph.D program 2012.

Gruber is a founder of the non-profit organization Exilarte.at, which is focused on composer research and music publishing in the time of the Holocaust. The exil.arte operates as a center of reception, preservation, revival of suppressed Austrian composers during the years of the 'Third Reich' through publishing music, books, and musical performance. Under his supervision exil.arte published a new book series, the recent publication in this series is "Hugo Kauder (1888–1972) KOMPONIST – MUSIKPHILOSOPH – THEORETIKER. Eine Biographie" (author Karin Wagner). Following by a successful accomplishment, Gruber received the Golden Stars Award by the EU commission in 2009 and the Bank Austria Art Prize in 2010. Since 2016 exil.arte became a research center at the mdw.

Gruber's teaching and administrative experience contributed to setting up many projects with his colleagues from other universities such as Bratislava, Rostock, London and other cities. From 2010 to 2013, he led the EU project "Accentus musicalis", which is an Early Music and Historical Music Performance research program. The project was collaborated with the Music Academy of Bratislava (VSMU), and the Slovak ensemble Musica Aeterna. Based on his 25 years of efforts on scientific and artistic work with Slovakia and Austria (especially in Bratislava and Vienna), he was granted the Honor of Doctorate from the VSMU in 2014. In 2011 an international symposium was held in Vienna to honor the composer Gustav Mahler at the Konzerthaus Wien, "After Mahler`s Death", with scientific contribution as well as artistic evaluations by Michael Tilson Thomas and Thomas Hampson (published 2013, ed. Gerold Gruber, Morten Solvik, Jan Vičar). Currently, Gruber initiated the Critical Edition of the writings by Schönberg at the Arnold Schönberg Center in Vienna, which will be published in the next few years.

== Artistic activity ==
In cooperation with the University for Music and Performing Arts, Gruber organizes different concerts, workshops, and events on the topic of exiled composers. In 2014, he led a tour through France, USA, and Mexico, where composers - suppressed and expelled under the Nazis - were performed in order to promote the works of these composers; Tansman, Zeisl, Arlen, Schönthal, Rubin, and others. The venues included the Maison Heinrich Heine, the Carnegie Hall, Palacio de Bellas Artes, and the Teatro Peón Contreras.

== Publications ==
- Gerold W. Gruber (ed.). "Hans Keller. Functional Analysis: The Unity of Contrasting Themes" : Complete Edition of the Analytical Scores. Frankfurt: P. Lang, 2001.
- Gerold W. Gruber (ed.). "Arnold Schönberg – Interpretationen seiner Werke", 2 Volumes., Laaber 2002
- Gerold W. Gruber (ed. and translator), Brendan G. Carroll. "Erich Wolfgang Korngold : das letzte Wunderkind" Vienna; Cologne; Weimar: Böhlau, 2012
- Gerold W. Gruber, Morten Solvik, and Jan Vičar. "After Mahler's Death." Olomouc: Palacký University. 2013.
- Reinhard Amon, Gerold W. Gruber. "Lexikon der musikalischen Form. Nachschlagewerk und Fachbuch über Form und Formung der Musik vom Mittelalter bis zur Gegenwart", Doblinger/Metzler Vienna 2011.
- Gerold W. Gruber. "Voice and Voices in Oratorios: On Sacred and Other Voices." In; On Voice, edited by Walter Bernhart, by Lawrence Kramer, 149–160. Amsterdam - New York, NY: Word and Music Studies 13, 2014.
