= Journal of Psychopathology and Behavioral Assessment =

- Discipline: Abnormal psychology
- Language: English
- Edited by: Randall T. Salekin

Publication details
- Former name: Journal of Behavioral Assessment
- History: 1979
- Publisher: Springer Science+Business Media
- Frequency: Quarterly
- Impact factor: 2.056 (2019)

Standard abbreviations
- ISO 4: J. Psychopathol. Behav. Assess.

Indexing
- CODEN: JPBAEB
- ISSN: 0882-2689 (print); 1573-3505 (web)
- LCCN: 86641264
- OCLC no.: 225929833

Links
- Journal homepage; Online archive

The Journal of Psychopathology and Behavioral Assessment is a quarterly peer-reviewed psychology journal covering psychological assessment as it relates to psychopathology and abnormal behaviors. It was established in 1979 as the Journal of Behavioral Assessment, obtaining its current name in 1985. It is published by Springer Science+Business Media and the editor-in-chief is Randall Salekin (University of Alabama). According to the Journal Citation Reports, the journal has a 2019 impact factor of 2.056.
