= Robert I. Gruber =

Former United States Air Force officer

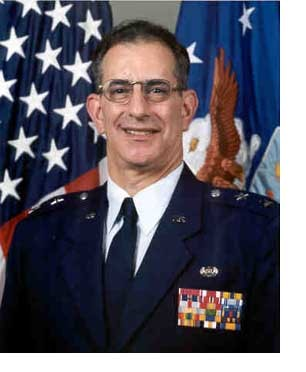
- Born: Port Chester, New York, U.S.
- Military career
- Allegiance: United States
- Service years: 1969–2004
- Rank: Major general
- Unit: Air National Guard
- Awards: Air Force Distinguished Service Medal; Legion of Merit; Meritorious Service Medal; Air Force Commendation Medal

Robert I. Gruber is a former United States Air Force officer who served as an assistant to the director, Air National Guard, for special projects, as the Air National Guard assistant to the judge advocate general and as principal advisor on Air National Guard legal services matters to the judge advocate general. His responsibilities included training oversight and operational readiness of more than 260 Air National Guard attorneys and more than 160 Air National Guard paralegals, and as chair of the judge advocate general's Air National Guard council, coordinating policies and programs for Air National Guard judge advocates and paralegals with the judge advocate general and the director, Air National Guard.

== Early life ==
Gruber was born and raised in Port Chester, New York.

== Career ==
Gruber served as an assistant to the director, Air National Guard, for special projects. The special projects included the proposed uniform state code of military justice and manual for courts martial. He previously served as the Air National Guard assistant to the judge advocate general, United States Air Force, Pentagon, Washington, District of Columbia. He then served as the principal advisor on Air National Guard legal services matters to the judge advocate general. His responsibilities included training oversight and operational readiness of more than 260 Air National Guard attorneys and more than 160 Air National Guard paralegals, and as chair of the judge advocate general's Air National Guard council, coordinating policies and programs for Air National Guard judge advocates and paralegals with the judge advocate general and the director, Air National Guard.

The general was commissioned as a judge advocate in March 1976. In addition to his staff judge advocate assignments, he principally authored and edited the first edition of the widely acclaimed Air National Guard Commanders Legal Deskbook, which has become a staple of the libraries of every Air National Guard commander and judge advocate. The general was also one of the Air National Guard's primary instructors and innovators of teaching methods at the Air Force Judge Advocate General's School, Maxwell Air Force Base, Alabama.

During his tenure at Maxwell, the general created the Contemporary Base Issues course, a participatory interactive problem-solving program for commanders and their key staff that was conducted six times each year and institutionalized as a mandatory program in the Air National Guard. The general also conceived the Air National Guard Law Office course that expedited the effectiveness and familiarity of newly accessed judge advocates and paralegals with the unique law practice in an Air National Guard legal office. In addition, the general spearheaded the design of the day-long legal curriculum and teaching methods for the Air National Guard Senior Commanders course.

In recognition of the general's contributions and accomplishments, the United States Air Force established the “Major General Robert I. Gruber Excellence in Teaching Award,” which is annually bestowed on the Air National Guard judge advocate or paralegal who best exemplifies the general's creative and innovative teaching techniques.

While serving as a traditional member of the Air Force National Guard, Gruber pursued a civilian career as an attorney.

== Personal life ==
Gruber is married and has three daughters.

== Education ==
- 1969 Franklin & Marshall College, Bachelor of Arts, Government, Lancaster, Pa.
- 1973 Fordham University School of Law, Juris Doctor, New York, N.Y.
- 1978 Squadron Officer School, by correspondence
- 1981 Air Command and Staff College, by correspondence
- 1987 Air War College, by correspondence

== Awards and decorations ==
- Air Force Distinguished Service Medal
- Legion of Merit
- Meritorious Service Medal
- Air Force Commendation Medal
- Air Force Outstanding Unit Award with one device
- Air Force Organizational Excellence Award
- Air Reserve Meritorious Service Medal
- Air Force Recognition Ribbon
- National Defense Service Medal
- Air Force Longevity Service Award with six oak leaf clusters
- Armed Forces Reserve Medal with twenty-year device
- Small Arms Expert Marksmanship Ribbon
- Air Force Training Ribbon
- Army Service Ribbon

== Other achievements ==
- 1974 - Diplomate, National Institute for Trial Advocacy
- 1992 - National Guard Bureau Minuteman Award as Air National Guard Judge Advocate of the Year
- 1992 - 1998 - Recording Secretary of The Judge Advocate General's Air National Guard Council
- 1993 - Outstanding Reserve Judge Advocate of the Year in Air Mobility Command
- 1993 - Reginald C. Harmon Award as United States Air Force Outstanding Reserve Judge Advocate of the Year
- 1994 - Author of three-volume Judge Advocate General's Air National Guard Council History
- 1994 - 1998 - Adjunct faculty member and lecturer at Air Force Judge Advocate General's School and creator of "JAG Jeopardy" teaching format

== Effective dates of promotions ==
Promotions
Insignia	Rank	Date
	Major General	May 24, 2001
	Brigadier General	Sept. 13, 1999
	Colonel	Dec. 10, 1995
	Lieutenant Colonel	April 3, 1986
	Major	April 3, 1982
	Captain	April 1, 1978
	First Lieutenant	March 11, 1976
