= Juan García Gruber =

Venezuelan economist, financier, writer, diplomat and philosopher

Juan Manuel García Grüber (September 7, 1904 – September 21, 1997) was a Venezuelan economist, financier, writer, diplomat, and philosopher. He served as Venezuela's ambassador to seven different countries.

== Early life and family ==
He was born in Guasipati, Bolívar state, Venezuela. He was the eldest son of Doña Mercedes Grüber, of German descent, and Dr. Juan Manuel García Parra, a leading figure in abdominal surgery, creator of the first formula known to favor high levels of fertility in women and founder of the Garcia Parra Hospital in his native Guasipati.

== Career ==
After completing his studies in economics and finance, he held the position of Chief of the Justice Section at the Department of Internal Affairs. 1953, he became the Venezuelan General Consul to Peru and was subsequently appointed as the Venezuelan Ambassador to Nicaragua, Panama, Cuba, Peru and Costa Rica. He was standing right next to Nicaraguan President Anastasio Somoza García when he was shot to death by Rigoberto López Pérez in 1956.

Throughout his lifetime, he wrote extensively on oil, democracy, arts, renaissance and various cultural subjects. Dr. García Grüber participated in the rescue of his family when they were held captive in revolutionary Nicaragua. In 1979, a plane from the Venezuelan Air Force piloted by his wife's nephew, Captain Raúl Hernández, was hastily sent in order to help set the hostages free. According to different news broadcasts at the time, the family was a victim of the Somoza guerrilla (Sandinista) and provisions had been made to kill them right before they attempted to escape through the nearest airport. Their liberation was eventually possible when the Venezuelan aircraft opened fire against Sandinista soldiers who tried to thwart the operation.

Later in life, he became president of the Venezuelan Institute for Hispanic Culture in Caracas, Venezuela. In his life as a writer, he became a prominent columnist for the newspaper el Universal of Caracas, where he criticized major aspects of democracy in Venezuela and the type of politics being conducted. Dr. García Grüber received several awards for his achievements (and was recognized as a peer by the most respected Hispanic language and literature academicians) which included, among others, the Order of the Liberator Simón Bolívar, Order of the Ibero American Chamber, Venezuelan Red Cross Order in its first degree plus two hundred or so medals. He was a highly esteemed figure both in his native Venezuela as well as abroad. His death brought great grief among those who knew him, particularly noted personalities which included former President Rafael Caldera and his wife Alicia Pietri de Caldera, dear friends of his.

Dr. García Grüber and his wife met Juan Carlos de Borbón, King of Spain, on his state visit to Venezuela in 1977. His strong ties to the embassies of Spain, Colombia, Perú, Panamá and Nicaragua account for his numerous accolades in the diplomatic and cultural fields. His work as a universal writer was published by influential editorial houses in Venezuela as he became an incisive columnist in well-known local newspapers. He regularly condemned his country's political ways and the ever-growing scourge of corruption in Latin America. He had a long time personal and professional association with his brother in law, Dr. Jorge Gómez Mantellini, former Governor of Caracas. As part of his duties as head of the Venezuelan Institute for Hispanic Culture, he unveiled the first statue of Spanish monarch, Isabel La Católica, ever to grace a Caracas square.

== Personal life ==
He was married to Bertha Domínguez Urbano-Taylor, a sibling of Ricardo Domínguez Urbano-Taylor. They were grandchildren of Countess Beatriz Ursban Taylor of New England He had two daughters, Bertha García-Grüber D. and Morella García-Grüber D., and one son, John García-Grüber D., who died in infancy. He had grandchildren through his daughter Morella Garcia Dominguez.
