= Peter Gruber =

Peter Gruber may refer to:

- Peter Gruber (1929–2014), Hungarian-born American philanthropist, co-founder of Peter and Patricia Gruber Foundation
- Peter M. Gruber (1941–2017), Austrian mathematician
- Peter Gruber (footballer) (born 1952), German footballer

== See also ==
- Peter Guber (born 1942), American film studio executive, sports team owner, entrepreneur
