= Samuel Gruber =

Samuel Gruber is the name of:

- Samuel H. Gruber (1938–2019), shark biologist and founder of the American Elasmobranch Society
- Samuel D. Gruber (born 1956), American art and architectural historian
- Samuel Gruber, a fictional character from the 2014 film Paddington and its 2017 sequel
