= Grube (Weser) =

River in Germany

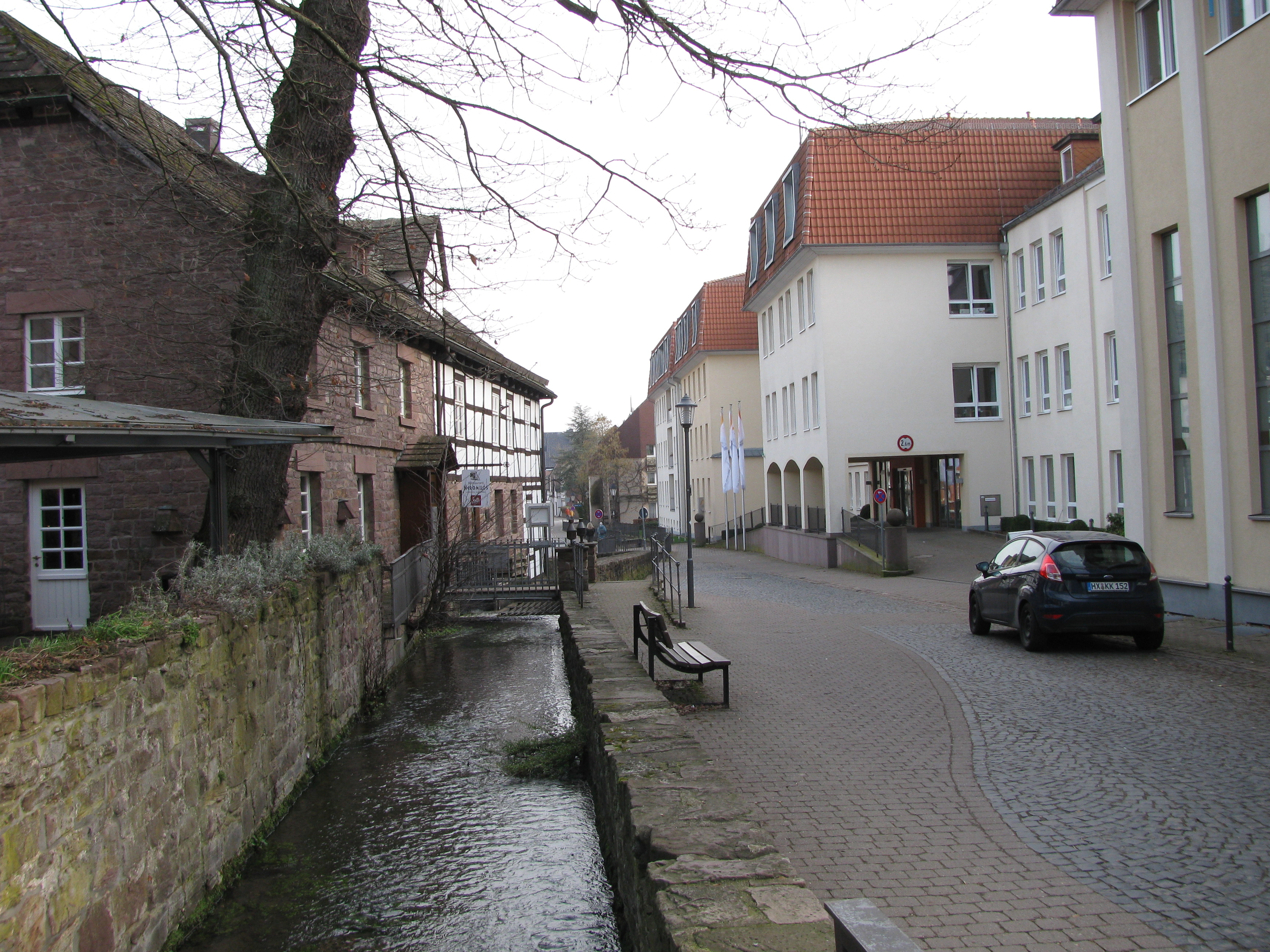

Location
- Country: Germany
- State: North Rhine-Westphalia

Physical characteristics
- Mouth
  - location: Weser
  - coordinates: 51°46′37″N 9°23′18″E
- Length: 18.4 km (11.4 mi)

Basin features
- Progression: Weser→ North Sea

Grube is a river of North Rhine-Westphalia, Germany. It flows into the Weser in Höxter.

== See also ==
- List of rivers of North Rhine-Westphalia
