= William C. Gruber =

American physician and scientist

- Education: Rice University; Baylor College of Medicine
- Scientific career
- Workplaces: Vanderbilt University; Wyeth; Pfizer

William C. Gruber is an American physician-scientist, pediatrician, and business executive. He was the senior vice-president and head of Pfizer vaccine clinical research and development from October 2009 until September 2023. He currently is Adjunct Professor of Pediatrics and Medicine, University of Michigan Medical School, and Adjunct Clinical Professor of Epidemiology, University of Michigan School of Public Health.

== Life ==
Gruber completed a bachelor's degree in mathematical sciences at Rice University. He earned an MD at Baylor College of Medicine, where he completed a residency in pediatrics and infectious disease. His college roommate was immunologist Barney S. Graham.

Gruber was an associate professor of pediatrics at the Vanderbilt University School of Medicine. He served as the director of the diagnostic virology laboratory at Vanderbilt University Medical Center. Gruber joined Wyeth in 1999 as the vice president of clinical vaccine research. He was senior vice president and head of Pfizer vaccine clinical research and development from October 2009 until retirement from Pfizer in September of 2023 . He oversaw the global clinical research and development of vaccines. Gruber is a fellow of the American Academy of Pediatrics, and the Infectious Diseases Society of America.
