= Falko Grube =

German politician (born 1977)

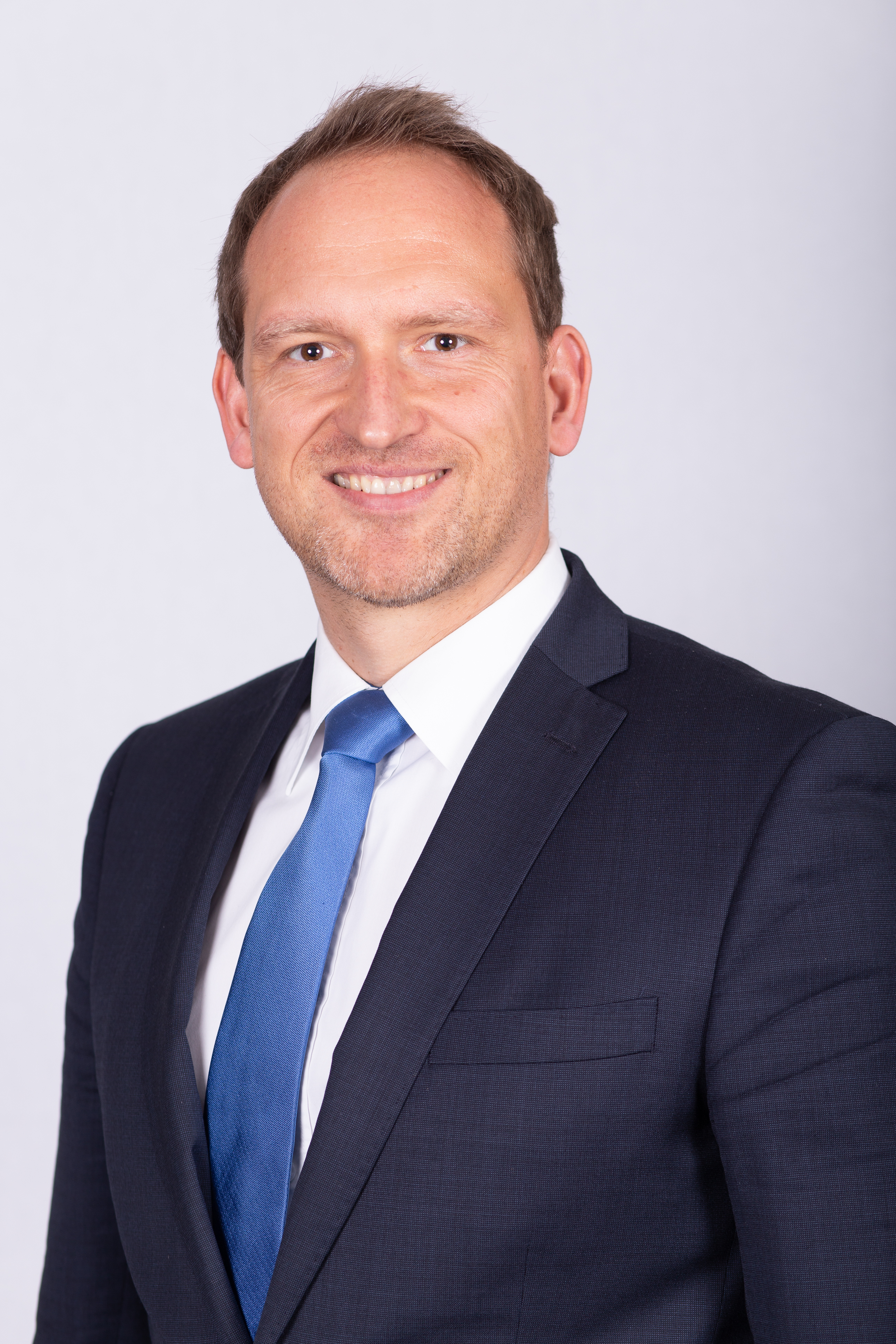
- Grube in 2018

Member of the Landtag of Saxony-Anhalt
- Incumbent
- Assumed office 18 May 2016
- Preceded by: Jörg Felgner

Personal details
- Born: 20 March 1977 (age 49) Magdeburg
- Party: Social Democratic Party (since 1999)

Falko Grube (born 20 March 1977 in Magdeburg) is a German politician serving as a member of the Landtag of Saxony-Anhalt since 2016. He has served as chairman of the Social Democratic Party in Magdeburg since 2010.
