= Franklin Grube =

American politician (1831–1869)

Franklin Grube (February 10, 1831 – June 11, 1869) was an American medical doctor and politician.

Grube was born in East Coventry, Pennsylvania, on February 10, 1831. He graduated from Yale College in 1852. In 1854, he graduated as M.D. at the University of Pennsylvania, then spent a year in foreign travel, and then removed to Clinton, Mississippi. In 1857, he removed to Geary City, Kansas, where he practiced his profession. He also filled various public offices, and in 1861 was chosen by the Union party as a member of the Kansas House of Representatives. During the war, he served three years as a Surgeon of the U.S. Volunteers from Pennsylvania, and was for a time the executive officer of Denison General Hospital, Camp Dennison, Ohio. Dr. Grube married, June 16, 1864, Miss A. L. Culver, of Rochester, New York, and soon after removed to Oregon City. He died of congestion of the liver at Jacksonville, Oregon, June 11, 1869, after an illness of only four days. At the time of his death, he was practicing medicine in Jacksonville. His widow survived him, with two sons.

== Notes ==
This article incorporates public domain material from the Yale Obituary Record.
