= Grubbe =

Grubbe is a surname. Notable people with the surname include:

- Eiler Grubbe (1532–1585), Danish statesman
- Emil Grubbe (1875–1960), American radiologist
- Evert Grubbe (died after 1492), Danish nobleman
- Marie Grubbe (1643–1718), Danish noble
- Walter Grubbe (1655–1715), English politician
