= Pia Stadtbäumer =

German sculptor (born 1959)

Pia Stadtbäumer (born 1959 in Münster) is a German sculptor. Stadtbäumer is known for her realistic, figurative sculptures.

Stadtbäumer entered the Düsseldorf Academy of Fine Arts in 1981.

Her sculptures are generally made by pouring wax or plastic into plaster moulds. She prefers to work from photographs rather than live models.
