= Gerlinde Gruber =

Austrian art historian and curator (born 1970)

- Born: 1970 (age 55–56)
- Education: University of Vienna
- Occupations: Art historian, curator

Gerlinde Gruber (born 1970) is an Austrian art historian and curator specializing in Flemish Baroque painting.

Since 2006, she has served as the curator for Flemish paintings at the Kunsthistorisches Museum.

She is recognized for her expertise in the works of Peter Paul Rubens and Michaelina Wautier, as well as her contributions to exhibitions, technical art studies, and scholarly publications.

== Education and career ==
Gruber studied art history and Romance studies at the University of Vienna, where she developed a strong interest in Flemish and Baroque art. Her master's thesis focused on tapestry production at Fontainebleau during the reign of Francis I, a subject she explored during her internship at the Kunsthistorisches Museum.

She completed her doctoral dissertation on Giacomo Francesco Cipper (“Il Todeschini”), an Austro-Italian genre painter, during her research stints in Milan and Florence. From 1999 to 2001, she worked at the Albertina Museum in Vienna, focusing on provenance research and database creation. In 2001, she joined the Kunsthistorisches Museum as curator of Dutch and Flemish Baroque art.

Gruber is the central institutional figure responsible for framing Wautier’s rediscovery within the Viennese museum context.

== Exhibitions and projects ==
Gruber has curated several notable exhibitions, including:

- ‘Rubens in Vienna’ (2004): An exploration of Peter Paul Rubens’ contributions to Baroque art.
- ‘Sensual, Female, Flemish’ (2009): A study of depictions of women in Flemish Baroque art, including works by Rubens, Van Dyck, and Michaelina Woutiers.
- ‘Rubens: The Power of Transformation’ (2017–2018): Co-curated with Jochen Sander, this exhibition examined Rubens’ process of adapting and transforming earlier works.

== Research and publications ==
Gruber has contributed significantly to research on Flemish Baroque painting. She utilized macro X-ray fluorescence (MA-XRF) scanning technology to uncover compositional changes in Rubens’ works, including ‘‘The Fur’’.

Her notable publications include:

- ‘Rubens’s Great Landscape with a Tempest: Anatomy of a Masterpiece’ (2020): Co-authored with Elke Oberthaler, this work analyzes the composition and restoration of Rubens’ iconic painting.
- ‘Mythological Subjects: Hercules to Olympus’ (2022): A comprehensive study of Rubens’ mythological works, part of the ‘Corpus Rubenianum Ludwig Burchard’ series.
- ‘Sensuality and Strength: Michaelina Woutiers in Context’ (2018): An analysis of Woutiers’ artistic legacy, focusing on her depictions of women and Bacchic themes.

== Media and recognition ==
Gruber's work has received extensive media attention, with reviews and features on her exhibitions and research. Her contributions have significantly advanced the understanding of Flemish Baroque art.
