= Martin Gruber =

Martin Gruber may refer to:

- Martin Gruber (luger) (born 1975), Italian luger
- Martin Gruber (choreographer), German director
- Martin J. Gruber, American economist
