= Andreas Gruber =

Andreas Gruber may refer to:

- Andreas Gruber (1859-1922), German victim of the Hinterkaifeck murders
- Andreas Gruber (director) (born 1954), Austrian film director and screenwriter
- Andreas Gruber (footballer) (born 1995), Austrian footballer

== See also ==
- Andrea Gruber (born 1966), American dramatic soprano
