= Dan Haybron =

American philosopher

Education
- Education: Rutgers University (PhD)

Philosophical work
- Era: 21st-century philosophy
- Region: Western philosophy
- Institutions: Saint Louis University
- Main interests: ethics, moral psychology
- Website: https://www.danhaybron.com/

Daniel M. Haybron is an American philosopher and the Theodore R. Vitali C.P. Professor of Philosophy at Saint Louis University. He is known for his works on ethics and moral psychology.

== Books ==
- Against Happiness. Columbia University Press, 2023. Coauthored with Owen Flanagan, Joseph E. LeDoux, Bobby Bingle, Batja Mesquita, Michele Moody-Adams, Songyao Ren, Anna Sun, and Yolonda Y. Wilson. With responses from critics Jennifer Frey, Hazel Rose Markus, Jeffrey D. Sachs, and Jeanne Tsai.
- Happiness: A Very Short Introduction. Oxford University Press, 2013
- The Pursuit of Unhappiness: The Elusive Psychology of Well-Being. Oxford University Press, 2008
