= Grubb Street =

Grubb Street may refer to:

- Grubb Street, an earlier name for Fleet Street, the main centre of newspaper printing and publishing in London
- Grubb Street, a location in Happisburgh, Norfolk, England
- Grubb Street, Kent, a settlement in Kent, England

== See also ==
- Grub Street (disambiguation)
