= Iris Mauss =

Social psychologist

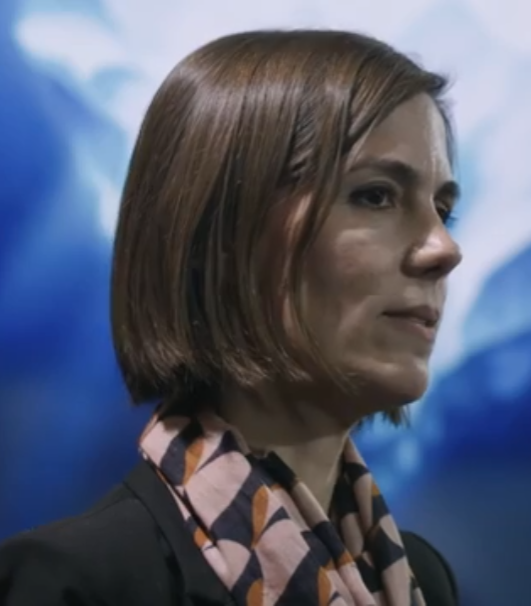
- Occupation: Professor of Psychology
- Awards: APA Distinguished Scientific Award for an Early Career Contribution to Psychology in the area of Social Psychology (2015); SPSP Carol and Ed Diener Award in Personality Psychology (2020)

Academic background
- Education: University of Trier; Heinrich Heine University; Stanford University

Academic work
- Institutions: University of California, Berkeley

Iris Mauss is a German-American social psychologist known for her research on emotions and emotion regulation. She holds the position of Professor of Psychology at University of California, Berkeley and Director of the Emotion & Emotion Regulation Lab. Her research has been cited in popular media, such as The New York Times, The Washington Post, and Psychology Today.

== Biography ==
Mauss was born Krefeld, Germany, the second of four siblings. Mauss's interest in psychology began in high school. She studied psychology at the University of Trier where she won a spot through an academic lottery. Mauss graduated from the University of Trier with a BA in psychology in 1993.

As a master's degree student at Düsseldorf University, Mauss traveled to the San Francisco Bay Area for an internship at a halfway house, helping patients adapt from an inpatient to outpatient lifestyle. This experience shifted her career from clinical psychology toward research. After completing her master's in Düsseldorf with highest honors in 1997, she moved to California to work on her Ph.D. at Stanford University, under the mentorship of James Gross. While at Stanford, Mauss completed a three-year predoctoral fellowship at the Bay Area National Institute of Mental Health (NIMH) Consortium in Affective Science.

At Stanford, Mauss's early research explored coherence between emotional experiences, behavioral responses, and physiological indicators of emotion. She had women watch short clips that evoked different emotions and rate the emotions they felt. Additionally, she recorded their facial expressions and measured their physiological responses with a polygraph. The results suggested that emotional experiences and behaviors (facial expressions) are closely correlated with each other, and less strongly correlated with physiological responses.

After completing her PhD in 2005, Mauss joined the faculty of the Department of Psychology at the University of Denver, where she remained until moving to UC Berkeley in 2012. Her research has been funded by grants from the National Institute on Aging.

Mauss has served as an Associate Editor of Cognition and Emotion and the Journal of Experimental Psychology: General.

== Research ==
Mauss's research program focuses on emotions, how people regulate their emotions, and the influence of emotions on health. She examines emotion experience, behavior, and physiological responding through a combination of laboratory, diary studies, and longitudinal survey approaches.

Mauss is known for her studies on the negative consequences of the pursuit of happiness, which suggest that the more people strive for happiness, the more likely they'll set up too high of standards and feel disappointed. In a 2-week daily-diary study, Mauss and her colleagues asked people to write about the most stressful part of their day and how lonely they felt. The authors found that those who valued happiness ended up feeling lonelier in stress-inducing situations than those who did not. In a follow-up study, Mauss and colleagues had participants watch an emotion affiliation film clip and then measured their progesterone hormone levels, which are sensitive to loneliness. The findings indicated that people who value happiness tend to experience relatively greater loneliness.

Mauss and her collaborators have studied how cognitive appraisal shapes emotion. According to the appraisal theory of emotion, the way a person interprets a situation, as opposed to the situation itself, is what causes them to have a specific emotional response. To test this theory, the research team set up a laboratory situation and induced a range of different emotions in a group of female participants. The results indicated that cognitive appraisals were accurate predictors of participants' emotional reactions.

Other collaborative research has focused on gender differences in neural mechanism underlying cognitive appraisal. Using functional magnetic resonance imaging (fMRI), Mauss and her colleagues showed participants negatively valanced images and asked them to use a cognitive reappraisal strategy to suppress their emotional responses. The observed gender differences in neural responses (lesser activity in prefrontal cortex and ventral striatal regions associated with reward processing) suggested that men may expend less effort in regulating their emotions as compared to women.

== Awards ==
Mauss won the American Psychological Association Distinguished Scientific Award for Early Career Contributions in the area of Social Psychology in 2015. Her award citation stated that Mauss "has profoundly advanced our knowledge about the nature and organization of emotion systems, the ways that emotions are regulated, and the influences that individual difference such as culture and gender have on emotional functioning."

Mauss was awarded the 2020 Carol and Ed Diener Award in Personality Psychology from the Society for Personality and Social Psychology.
