= Todd Grubbs =

American musician

Todd Grubbs is an American rock-fusion guitarist and composer, primarily of complex and melodic instrumental music.

== Work as musician ==
Grubbs is from Tampa, Florida, and studied at Berklee College of Music in Boston.

== Work as guitar instructor ==
Grubbs has taught guitar since the 1990s. He has released 5 full-length CDs.

== Influences ==
In an interview on Outside Radio Hours, Grubbs stated that his influences include Jeff Beck, Steve Vai, Allan Holdsworth, John Coltrane, The Beatles, and Frank Zappa.

== Discography ==
- 1994: Combination
- 2004: Beautiful Device
- 2004: Toddities
- 2011: Return of the Worm
- 2015: As the Worm Turns
