= Jonathan Gruber =

Jonathan Gruber may refer to:

- Jonathan Gruber (economist) (born 1965), American academic, educator; Patient Protection and Affordable Care Act co-architect
- Jonathan Gruber (filmmaker) (Follow Me: The Yoni Netanyahu Story)
- J. Mackye Gruber, American screenwriter

== See also ==
- John Gruber (born 1973), American technology pundit
