= Hans Gruber (disambiguation) =

Hans Gruber is the main antagonist in the 1988 film Die Hard.

Hans Gruber may also refer to:

- Hans Gruber (conductor) (1925–2001), Canadian conductor
- Hans Gruber (footballer) (1905–1967), German footballer
- Dr. Hans Gruber, a character in the 1985 film Re-Animator
- Hans Gruber, an antagonist in the 1966 film Our Man Flint
- Hans Gruber, a pet pig in several episodes of the television series American Housewife
- Hans Gruber, a character played by Heiko Ruprecht in the 2008 German-Austrian TV series Der Bergdoktor

== See also ==
- Hans Grüper, former identity of Dr. Arthur Arden, a character in the TV series American Horror Story: Asylum
