= Asta Gröting =

German sculpture, video and performance artist

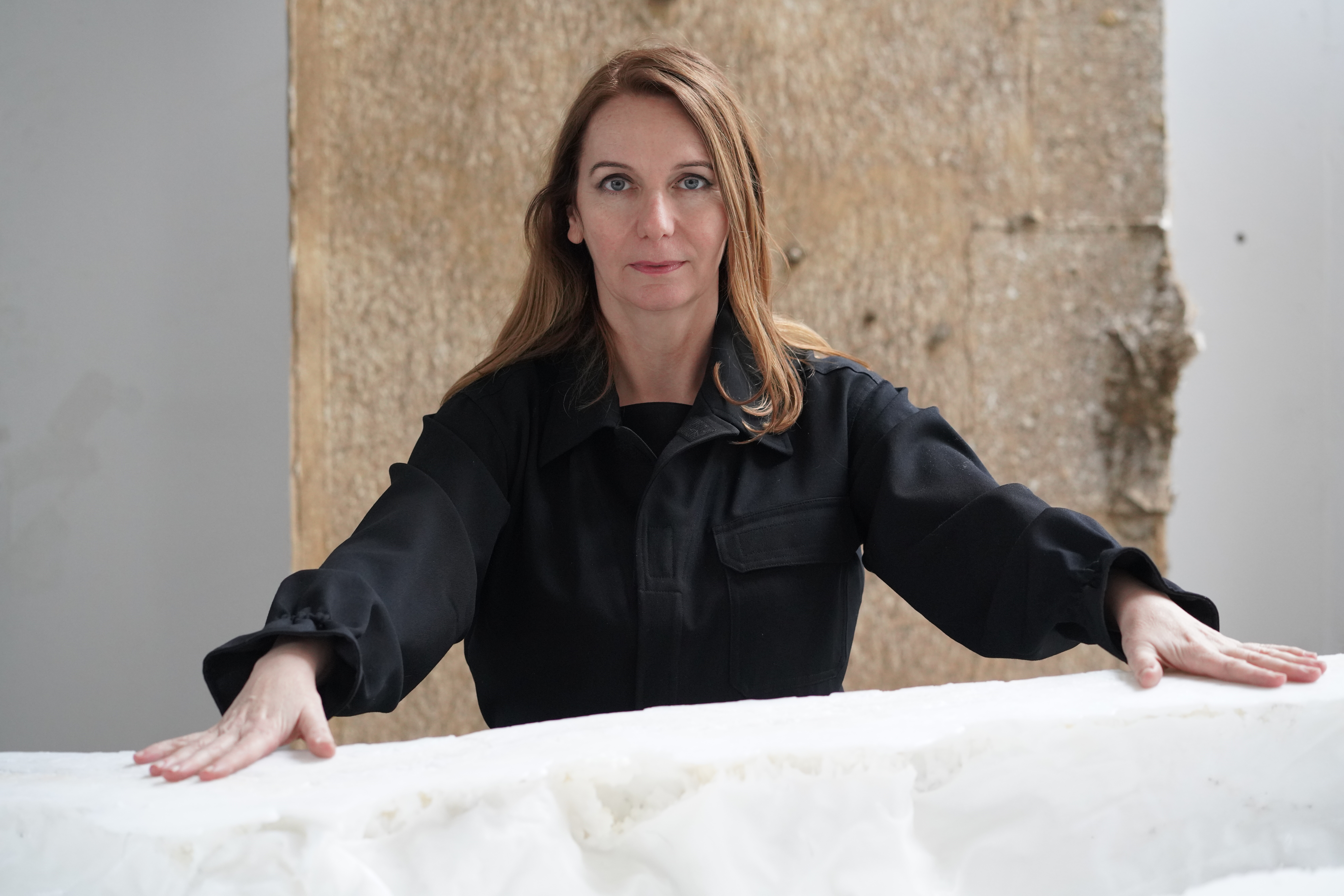
Gröting in 2018

Asta Gröting (born 1961 in Herford, Germany) is a contemporary artist. She works in sculpture, performance, and video. In her work, Gröting "is conceptually and emotionally asking questions of the social body by taking something away from it and allowing this absence to do the talking".

== Biography ==
Asta Gröting studied sculpture at the Düsseldorf Academy of Arts, graduating in 1986. Her work has been shown in solo exhibitions at KINDL - Centre for Contemporary Art Berlin, the Kunstraum Dornbirn, the Neuer Berliner Kunstverein, the LENTOS Art Museum in Linz, and the Henry Moore Institute, among others. She has also participated in international group exhibitions including the Maas Museum in Sydney, the 8th and the 14th Biennale of Sydney, the 44th Venice Biennale, the Fundación Juan March, the Belvedere and the 22nd Bienal de São Paulo.

Gröting studied sculpture at the State Academy of Fine Arts Düsseldorf from 1981 to 1987. From 1996 to 1997, she served as a visiting professor at the Valand Academy of the University of Gothenburg, the University of Kassel, and the Städelschule (State Academy of Fine Arts) in Frankfurt am Main. From 1997 to 2003, she was Professor of Sculpture at the Academy of Fine Arts Munich. From 2009 to 2025, she taught at the Braunschweig University of Art (HBK Braunschweig).

== Works (selection) ==
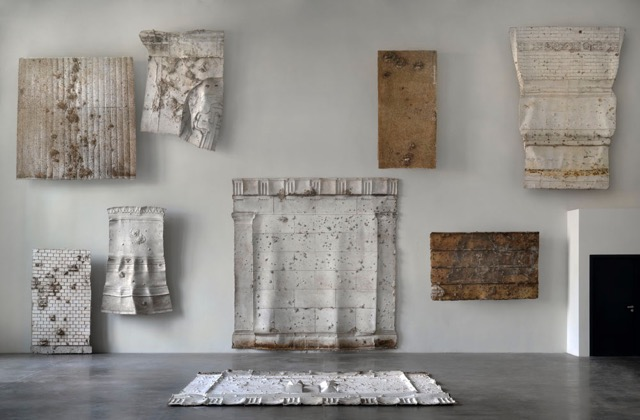
Asta Gröting, Berlin Facades, installation view, KINDL, Berlin, 2017. Photo: Jens Ziehe.

Gröting's earlier work focused on sculpture before she also turned to video and performance, starting 1993. Gröting's works often present ordinary, familiar elements, where the viewer's attention is drawn towards their material transformation, caused by the exaggeration of the familiar. In Gröting's work there is a focus on what is not visible, like the inner voice, the space between lovers having sex, the digestive system, or the inside of holes made by bullets, and the ways in which the invisible can be brought to the surface. As such, she allows absence to do the talking. In these explorations a sense of realism is at work that pays attention to what is not considered to be beautiful, or to what is seen as damaged or even damaging. She develops works that convert psychological and emotional perspectives to the complex relationships of people into clear forms. Often they are presented in work groups or series.

=== Time as a sculptural medium ===
The representation and manipulation of time through technical means is the subject of a number of filmic and performative works. By breaking down movement or using time-lapse, these works capture—through technology—what remains hidden to the human eye.

Since 1993, Gröting has produced film and video works where she examines both the relationship between humans and animals and their nature. The video Wolf and Dog (2021) shows an encounter between the two animals, recorded with an ultra-high-speed camera. In the extreme slow motion of their interaction, the domesticated dog appears aggressive, while the wolf behaves calmly and composedly—contradicting the familiar image of the wild wolf from fairy tales and the fears associated with it.

Kirsty Bell has written of another video, Primate and Human, that:

In this and all her works, Gröting draws us into her way of seeing. Her films and sculptures are interested in looking intently with a microscopic focus at surfaces, appearances and effects in order to ascertain what lies beneath them. Each piece seems to be seeded in the question, what is the nature of x? With a forensic attention to detail, she searches for aspects not visible to the naked eye, asking what can surfaces tell us that we don't know that we know? How can we look again at what is right before us?

=== Trauma and Architecture ===
Berlin Fassaden (2016–2018) consists of a series of negative imprints made out of silicone that are monumental in size. They track the traces of the bullet holes made during the war in facades that have not yet been renovated. For Gröting the casts function as photographic long exposures that depict the story from the moment of the bullets’ impact to the present time, taking along dust, dirt, and even graffiti. “I want to look from inside these destroyed walls and facades into the world,” Gröting says, “as if I could see my own face staring back at me.”

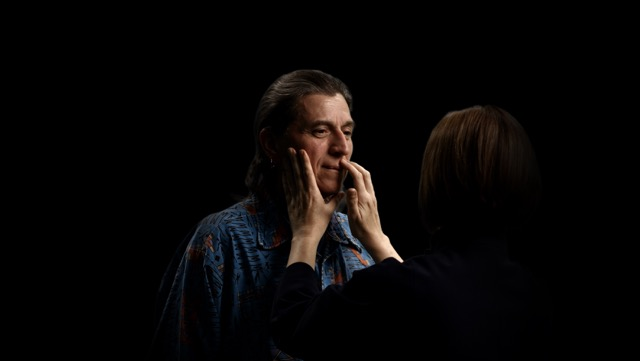

=== Labour and Industrialization ===
In "The Traveling Carriage of Goethe," "The Mercedes of Adenauer and My Smart" (2011), Gröting made full-scale casts of the undersides of three vehicles from three different centuries. The rubber molds visualize a sculptural history of movement. Motion is also the topic of Gröting's video Parken, in which from a bird's eye view we see several cars competing for a parking space.

=== Physical Communication ===
Space Between Lovers (2008–ongoing) is the materialization of a physical intimate moment. Two actors were covered in silicone while they were having sex. In this way, the in-between, the inner space was visualized sculpturally. Both intimacy and distance define also Space Between a Family (2010–2015), which consists of life-size casts of members of Gröting's family made over the course of several years. “It is not hard to imagine that these introspective figures possess internal organs,” the British author Deborah Levy writes, “but they are uncanny too, mournful grey ghosts of substance who seem to be emerging from both a war and a womb.”

From the early nineties onwards, Gröting took an interest in immaterial media like performance and video alongside sculpture. For The Inner Voice (1993–2004) Gröting explored ventriloquism as a performative instrument to research the soul and its inner workings. A series of videos came about depicting conversations between a dummy created by the artist and ventriloquists from all over the world. In their own native language they performed dialogues written by Gröting, Deborah Levy, and Tim Etchells. On several occasions Gröting worked together with the Native American ventriloquist Buddy Big Mountain.

Touch is an ongoing series, which the artist started in 2015. Gröting invited a number of friends to sit for a portrait. The portraits consists of the artist tracing the contours of their face with her hands. It recalls the gestures of sculpting, reading the face's expression.

=== Personal Power Relations ===
The interpersonal dimension of personal and social relationships, as well as the relationship between the unspoken and the unspeakable in the physical and psychological realms, is a recurring theme in Asta Gröting's long-term bodies of work.

The six-part series Miniature Studio (2022), a 3D-printed miniature of a scan of Gröting's studio, was created in response to urban development and real estate pressures in Berlin. It addresses questions about the size—and increasingly reduced scale—of affordable artists' studios, as well as the relationship between the artist's workspace and the artwork itself. Gröting has been involved in efforts to preserve the artists' studios at the Uferhallen in Berlin, together with artists including Katharina Grosse, Monica Bonvicini, John Bock, Heiner Franzen, Karin Sander, and others.

In the video Matthias, Helge and Asta (2025), Matthias Brandt poses the question of failure. Helge Schneider and Asta Gröting respond with glances. The video premiered in 2025 at the Städel Museum in Frankfurt am Main.

=== The Internal Organs ===
Gröting gained international recognition in the early 1990s with a series of works focusing on internal organs and the relationship between the interior and exterior of the body. In the sculpture Mensch (1990), the digestive system is reproduced in solid glass as an enlarged anatomical model. The work was exhibited at the 44th Venice Biennale in 1990.

The laser installation Atemkurve (Breathing Curve) (2025) represents human inhalation and exhalation. A line traces a variation of a medical graph measuring lung volume during the intake of oxygen and the release of carbon dioxide from the blood.

=== Nature and Display ===
The work Gelée Royal (2023) is part of a long-standing series exploring the relationship between (natural) objects and display. These wall works consist of acrylic or polyester blocks—transparent or tinted—mounted at a distance from the wall. Some contain embedded objects, while others allow the viewer to see objects attached to the wall through the block. The idea draws on the image of a magnifying or reducing lens.

== Solo exhibitions (selection) ==
- 2026 Asta Gröting: Things, Belvedere, Vienna, Austria
- 2026 Asta Gröting. Herz, carlier | gebauer, Berlin, Germany
- 2025 Asta Gröting. Ein Wolf, Primaten und eine Atemkurve, Städel Museum, Frankfurt am Main, Germany
- 2023 Fortune. Asta Gröting and Ming Wong, carlier | gebauer, Berlin, Germany
- 2023 n.b.k. Video-Forum | Fensterprojektionen, Goethe-Institut Montreal, Montreal, Canada
- 2023 Asta Gröting. Das Wesen von x – Gerhard-Altenbourg-Preis 2023, Lindenau-Museum Altenburg, Germany
- 2017 Berlin Fassaden, KINDL – Zentrum für Zeitgenössische Kunst, Berlin, Germany
- 2017 (Im)mutable, Asta Gröting – Sean Snyder, HBK Galerie, Braunschweig, Germany
- 2017 Die Geschichte der Werkzeuge ist das aufgeschlagene Buch der menschlichen Psychologie, Kunstraum Dornbirn, Austria
- 2016 Touch, Galerie Carlier | Gebauer, Berlin, Germany
- 2015 Asta Gröting, Galerie Carlier | Gebauer, Berlin, Germany
- 2014 Asta Gröting, Arbeiten aus der Sammlung der Landesbank Baden-Württemberg und der Sammlung Grässlin, ZKM | Zentrum für Kunst und Medientechnologie Karlsruhe, Germany
- 2010 Parallel Performances, Asta Gröting, Maria Eichhorn, Arter, Istanbul, Turkey
- 2010 Asta Gröting, Neuer Berliner Kunstverein, Berlin, Germany
- 2010 Asta Gröting, Lentos, Linz, Austria
- 2009 Asta Gröting Sculpture: 1987–2008, Henry Moore Sculpture Institute, Leeds, UK
- 2006 The Inner Voice, MARTa, Herford, Germany

== Awards ==
- 2023 Gerhard-Altenbourg-Preis des Lindenau-Museums Altenburg
- 1996: Preis der Bayrischen Landesbank International S.A.
- 1994: Otto-Dix-Preis, Gera
- 1991: Förderpreis für Bildende Kunst des Landes Nordrhein-Westfalen
- 1990: A.&W. Grohmann Fellowship, Baden-Baden
- 1989: Schmidt-Rotluff-Fellowship
- 1988: Stiftung Kunstfonds

== Public collections (selection) ==
Verein der Freunde der Nationalgalerie for the Collection Nationalgalerie Berlin, Berlin / Arnold Forde, Los Angeles, USA / Carol Schwartz, Denver, USA / Collection Helga de Alvear, Madrid, Spain / evn sammlung, Maria Enzersdorf, Austria / Fonds Régional d'Art Contemporain (FRAC), Limoges, France / Fundació la Caixa, Barcelona, Spain / Hypo-Bank, Munich / Institut für Auslandsbeziehungen (ifa), Stuttgart / Jerome Stern, New York, USA / Koç Foundation, Istanbul, Turkey / Landesbank Baden-Württemberg, Stuttgart / MARTa Herford, Herford / Museum Ludwig, Cologne / Saint Louis Art Museum, Saint Louis, USA / Sammlung Block, Berlin / Sammlung Deutsche Bank, Frankfurt a.M. / Sammlung Goetz, Munich / Sammlung Grässlin, St. Georgen / Sammlung Schwenk, Haigerloch / Staatsgalerie Stuttgart / Stedelijk Museum voor Actuele Kunst (SMAK), Gent, Belgium / Valdemar Gerdin, Stockholm, Sweden / Von der Heydt-Museum, Wuppertal

== Bibliography ==
- Asta Gröting. Das Wesen von x. Video Works 1993-2023. Gerhard-Altenbourg-Preis 2023, Spector Books, Leipzig, 2023, ISBN 978-3-95905-785-1
- Asta Gröting, Berlin Fassaden, ed. Andreas Fiedler, exhibition catalogue KINDL - Centre for Contemporary Art, Berlin, September 10 - December 3, 2017 ISBN 978-3-95679-356-1
- Asta Gröting, Die Geschichte der Werkzeuge ist das aufgeschlagene Buch der menschlichen Psychologie, exhibition catalogue Kunstraum Dornbirn, Austria, March 17 - May 14, 2017 ISBN 978-3-903153-88-2
- Asta Gröting, exhibition catalogue, eds. Marius Babias and Stella Rollig, Neuer Berliner Kunstverein - n.b.k. Berlin and Lentos Kunstmuseum Linz, Köln 2010 ISBN 978-3-86560-786-7
- Asta Gröting. Sculpture: 1987–2008, exhibition catalogue Henry Moore Sculpture Institute, 8 February - 26 April 2009, Leeds 2009
- Asta Gröting. The Inner Voice, eds. Jan Hoet and Christoph Keller, Revolver, Archiv für Aktuelle Kunst, Frankfurt am Main 2004 (English and German) ISBN 3-86588-003-7
