= Puster Valley =

Coordinates: 46°44′N 12°13′E

- District
- Comunità comprensoriale Val Pusteria; Bezirksgemeinschaft Pustertal
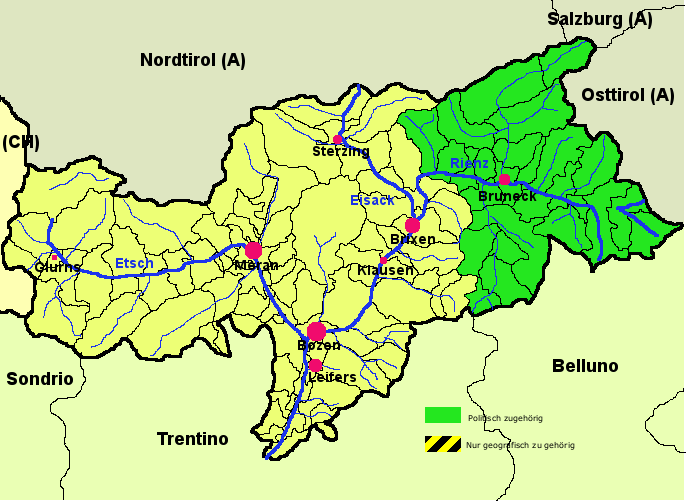
- Puster Valley (highlighted in green) within South Tyrol
- Country: Italy
- Autonomous region: Trentino-Alto Adige
- Autonomous province: South Tyrol
- Established: 1969
- Administrative seat: Bruneck (Brunico)

Area
  - Total: 2,072 km^{2} (800 sq mi)

Population (2005)
  - Total: 76,149
  - Density: 36.75/km^{2} (95.19/sq mi)
- Website: www.bezirksgemeinschaftpustertal.it

The Puster Valley (Italian: Val Pusteria [ˈval pusteˈriːa]; German: Pustertal, Ladin: Val de Puster, Slovene: Pustriška dolina) is one of the largest longitudinal valleys in the Alps that runs in an east-west direction between Lienz in East Tyrol, Austria, and Mühlbach near Brixen in South Tyrol, Italy. The South Tyrolean municipalities of the Puster Valley constitute the Puster Valley district.

== Puster Valley ==
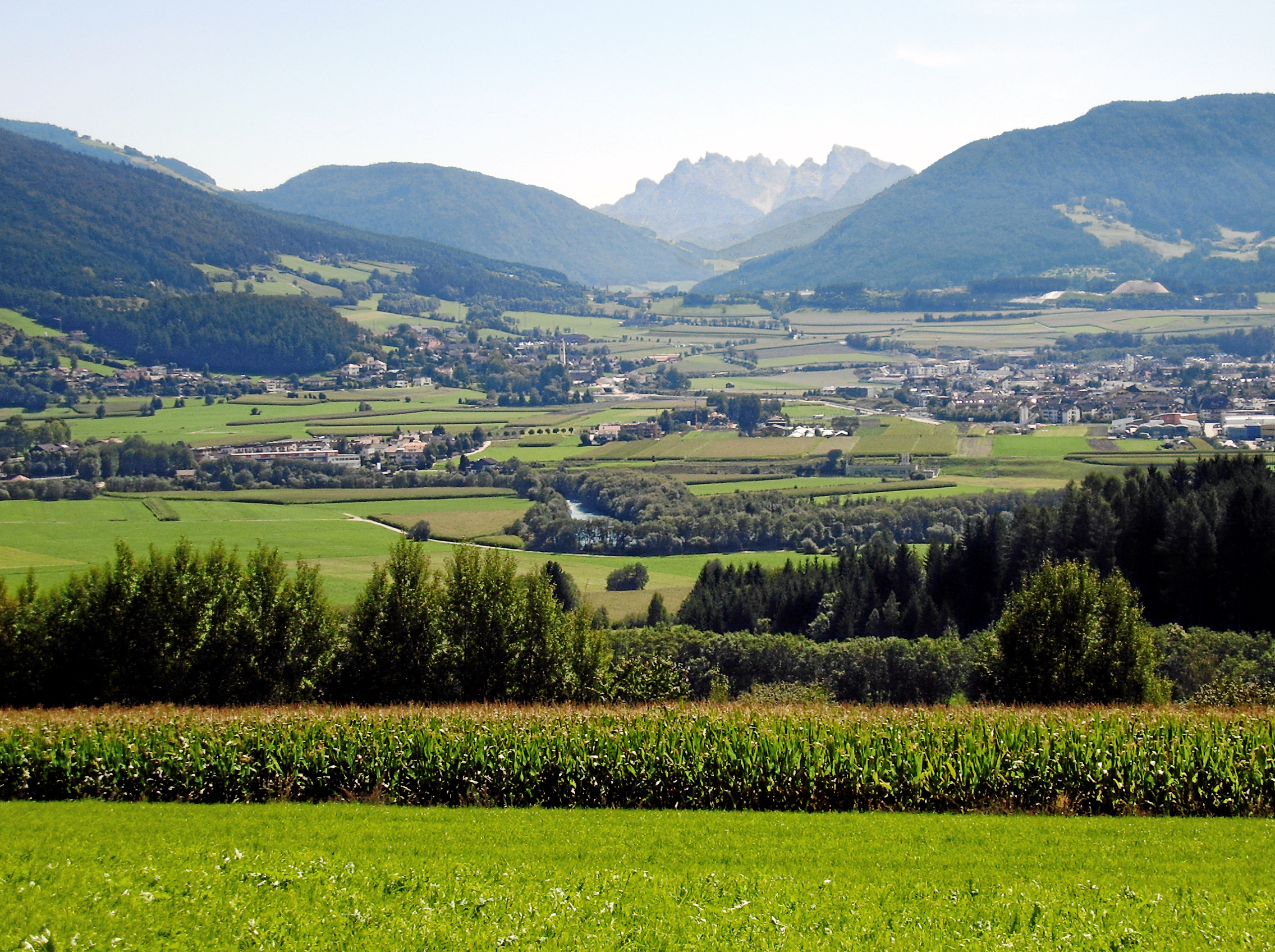
The Puster Valley at Bruneck

The Puster Valley is located in the western part of the Periadriatic Seam, which separates the Southern Limestone Alps from the Central Eastern Alps, as well as most of the limestone Alps from the central gneiss and slate peaks of the range's central section. East of Sillian, the Puster Valley leaves the Peradriatic Line (which moves into the Gail valley) and turns to the northeast towards Lienz.

Half of the valley drains to the west to the Adriatic via the Adige river; the other half drains to the east to the Black Sea via the Danube. The watershed lies in the shallow valley floor called Toblacher Feld (Conca di Dobbiaco). The Rienz river flows westwards through the Puster Valley and the Drau river flows eastwards into East Tyrol. The eastern part of the valley on the upper Drava is called Upper Puster Valley.

The towns in the Puster Valley are located between 750 and 1,180 meters (2,460 and 3,870 ft) above sea level. The most important of these towns in the western valley are Welsberg-Taisten, Olang, and Bruneck; the most important in the eastern valley are Toblach, Innichen, Sexten, and Sillian.

The largest tributaries of the Rienz river form the Antholzer Bach, the Ahr, the Pragser Bach, the Gsieser Bach, the Gran Ega, the Pfunderer Bach, and the Lüsenbach. The Puster Valley's largest side valley is the Tauferer Ahrntal. The Drau's largest eastern tributaries are the Sextner Bach and the Villgraten-Bach.

== History ==
The Puster Valley was inhabited since prehistoric times as finds belonging to the Iron Age have been found in that area. In more recent times this zone was inhabited by people belonging to the Illyrian stock: they were called "Saevates" by the Romans (hence the name "Sebatum" of the Roman station of today's Saint Lawrence.) In the 6th century, the Celtic invaders merged with the Illyrian population. Around the end of the I century B.C, the Rienz valley was mainly used by the Romans as an arterial road to connect the north-eastern regions of the Empire. The Puster Valley belonged to the imperial province of Noricum, and the local populations, during the four centuries of the domination of Rome, began to assimilate the customs, the language and finally the Christian religion. In the 5th century the Goths, the Baiuvarii and the Slavs decided to descend in this area, with consequent conflicts between Baiuvarii and Slavs, which ended with the Baiuvarii victory. In the course of their westward migration, the Slavs settled in East Tyrol and left visible traces in the place names. In the 10th century the Puster Valley started to belong to the Pustrissa countship, firstly mentioned in 974 as Pustrissa and Pustrussa; in 1091 the countship was ceded by the Emperor Henry IV to the Bishop of Brixen and in the 16th century the Hapsburg took possession of it. During the Napoleonic era, following the Austrian defeat at Austerlitz and the treaty of Pressburg in 1805, the entire region passed to the Bavaria: the Tyroleans, led by Andreas Hofer, repeatedly fought against the Bavarian domination. After Napoleon's fall, the Puster valley was reunited with Austria and, following the World War I, it was assigned to Italy.

Opening in 1871 the Puster Valley Railway uses the relative simple landscape to avoid climbing steep slopes.

== Puster Valley District ==
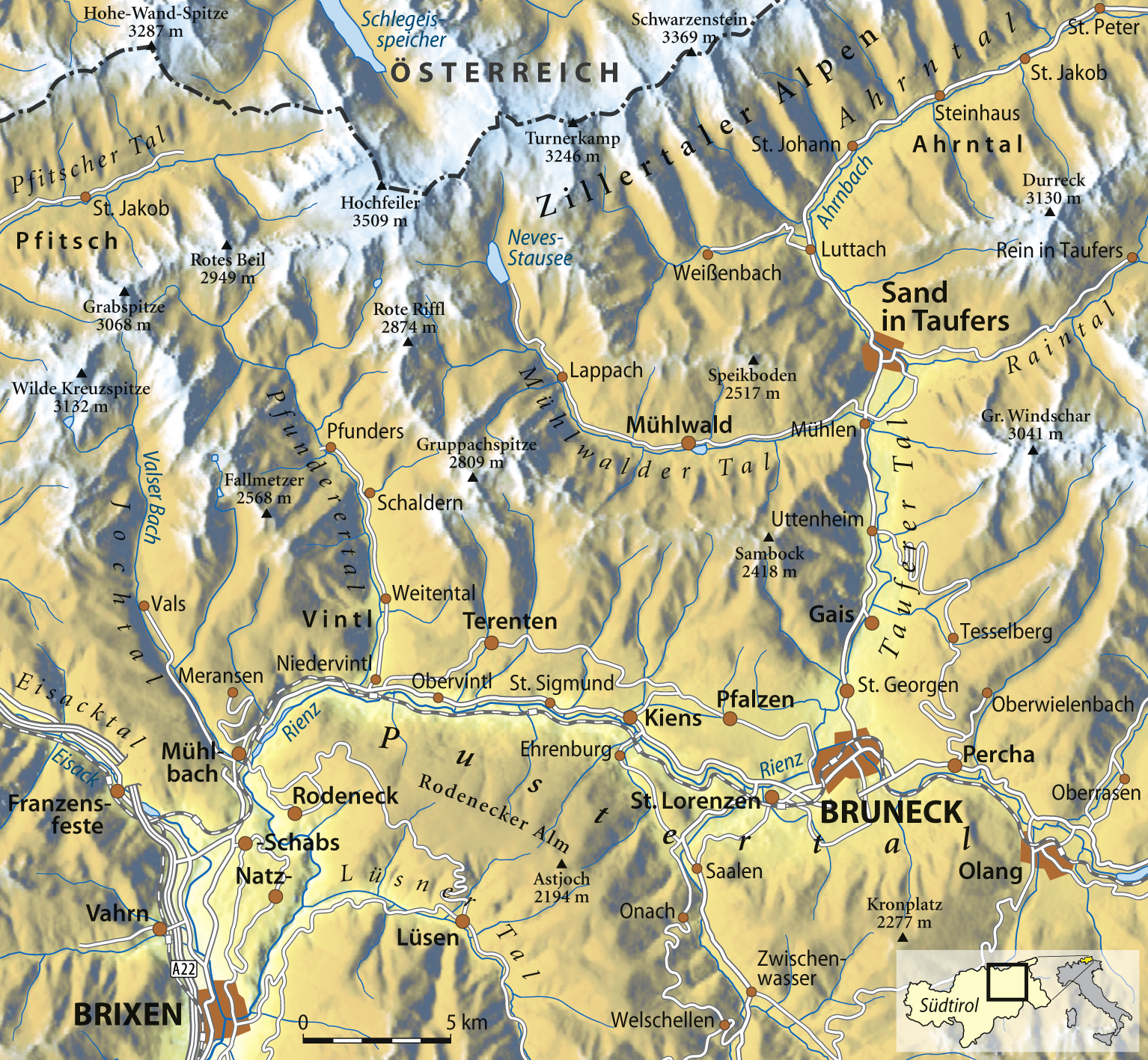
Map of the Puster Valley.

The Puster Valley District (Italian: Comprensorio della Val Pusteria; German: Bezirksgemeinschaft Pustertal) was founded in 1969 with the merger of 26 municipalities. Its combined area is 2,071 km² and its population is over 73,000. Its main town is Bruneck. According to the 2001 census, 80.96% of the population of the valley speak German, 13.40% Ladin, and 5.64% Italian as their native language.

The following municipalities are part of the Puster Valley District:

- Ahrntal
- Badia
- Bruneck (district capital)
- Corvara
- Gais
- Gsies
- Innichen
- Kiens
- La Val
- Mareo
- Mühlwald
- Niederdorf
- Olang
- Percha
- Pfalzen
- Prags
- Prettau
- Rasen-Antholz
- Sand in Taufers
- St. Lorenzen
- San Martin de Tor
- Sexten
- Terenten
- Toblach
- Vintl
- Welsberg-Taisten

== Gallery ==
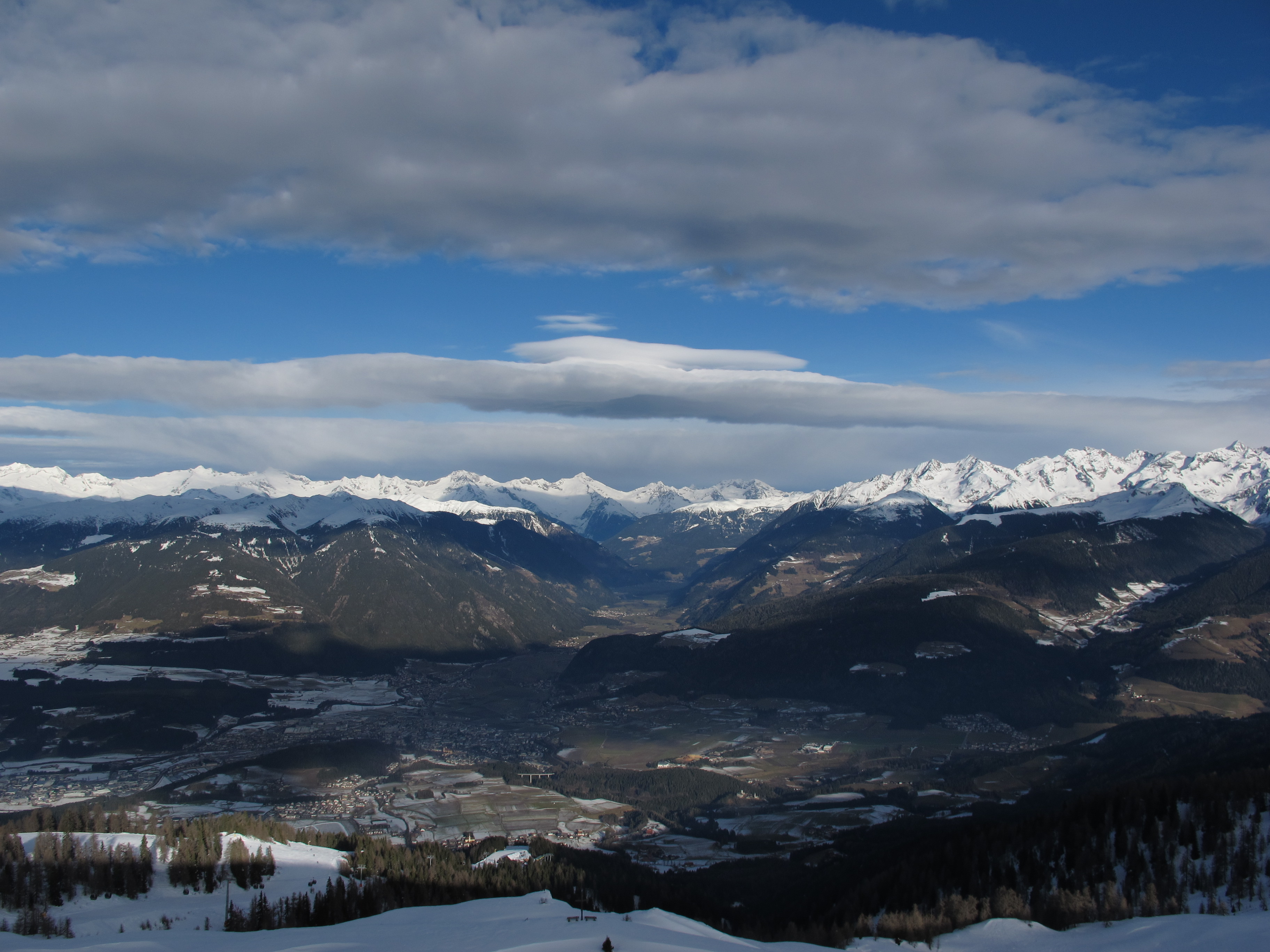
Ahrntal and Bruneck

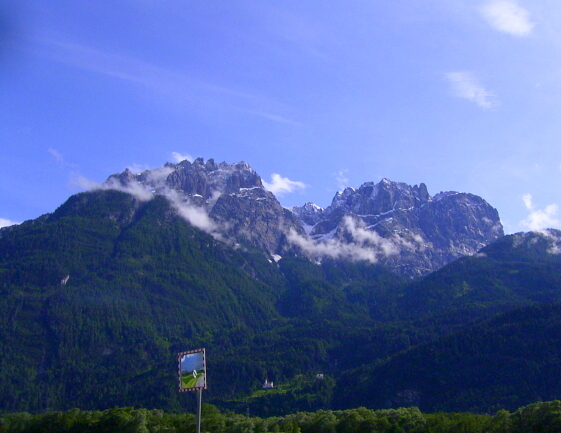
Lienzer Dolomite range in East Tyrol in the Upper Puster Valley

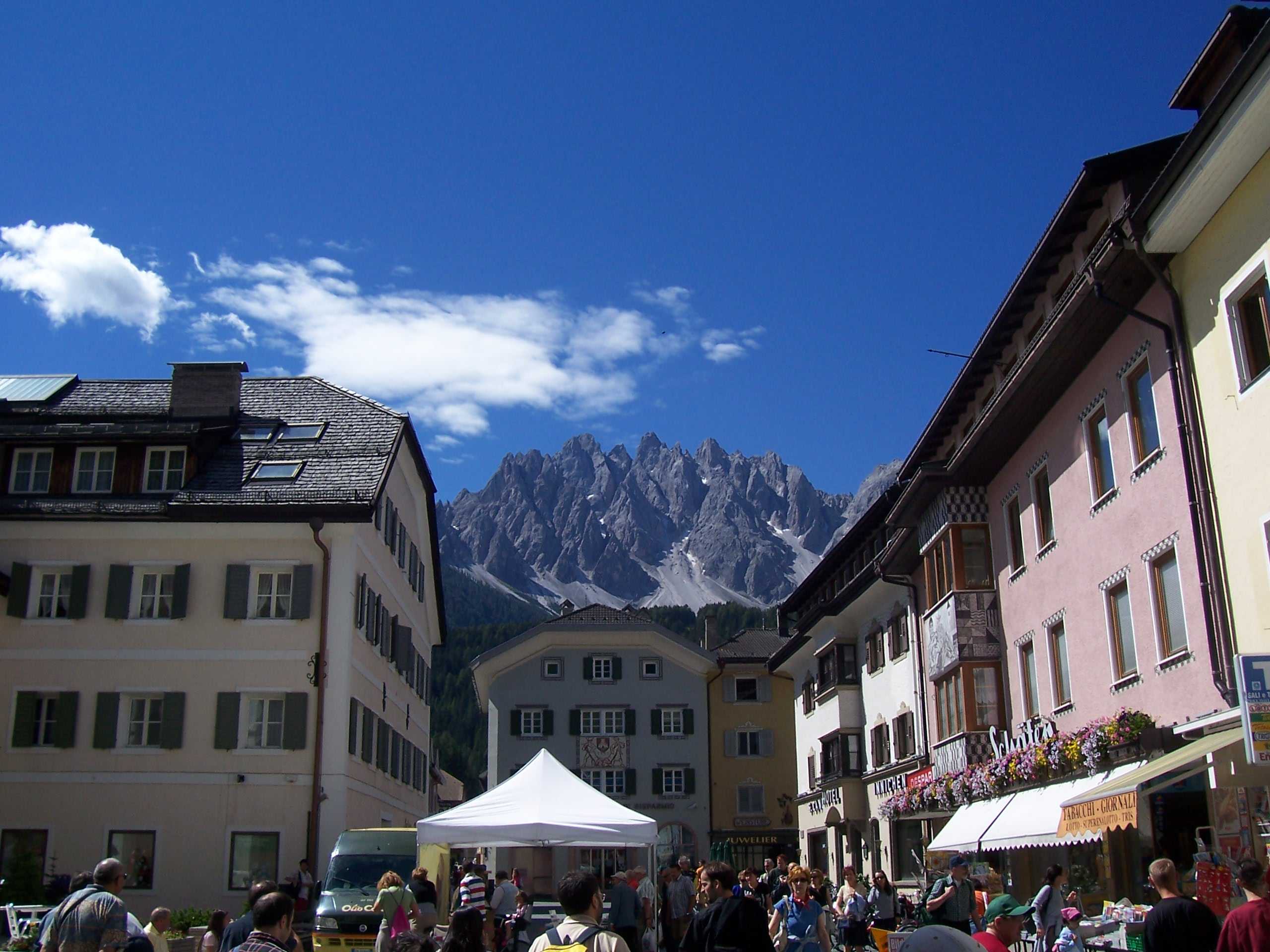
Innichen

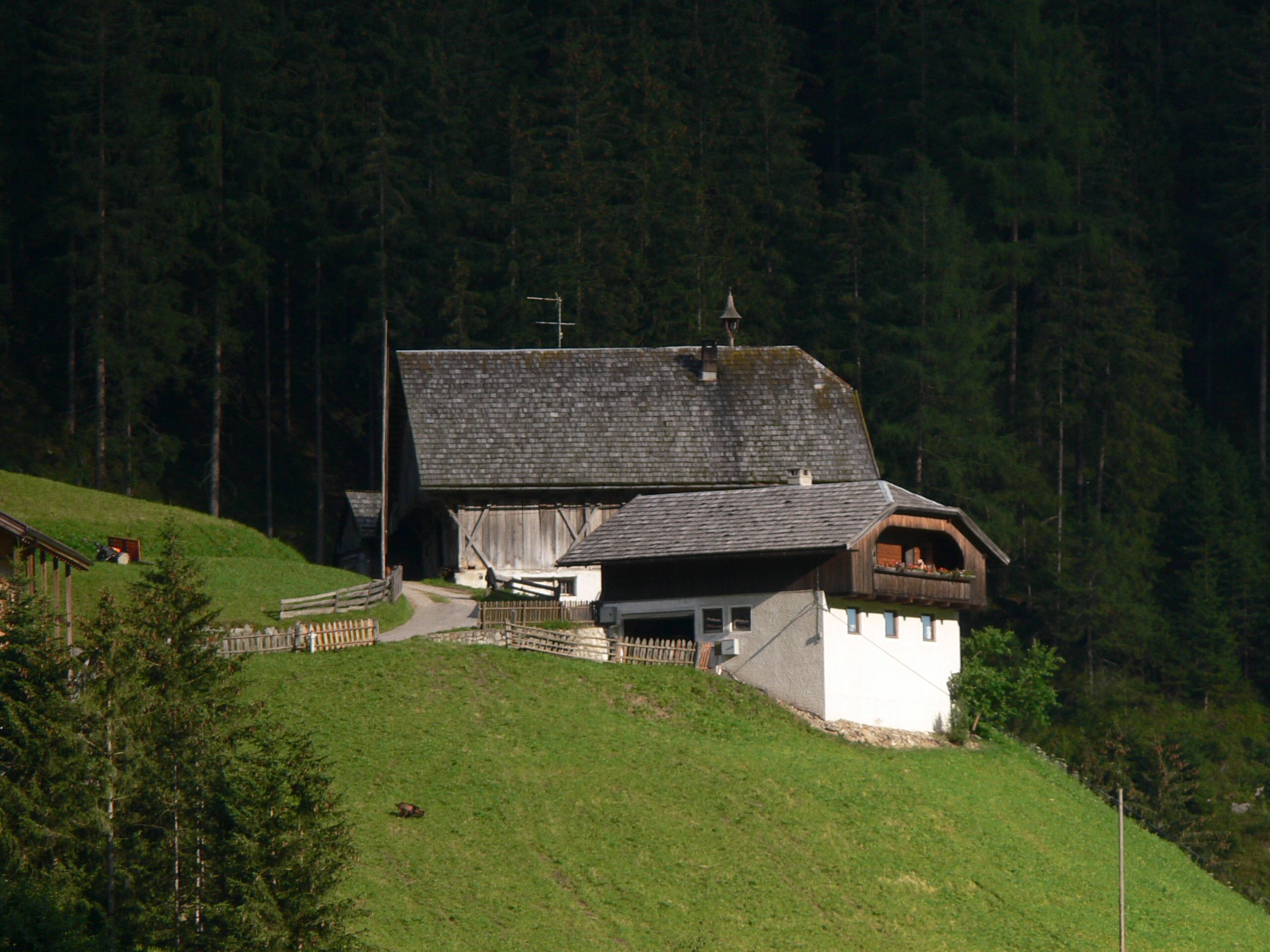
Farmhouse in the Antholz Mittertal valley

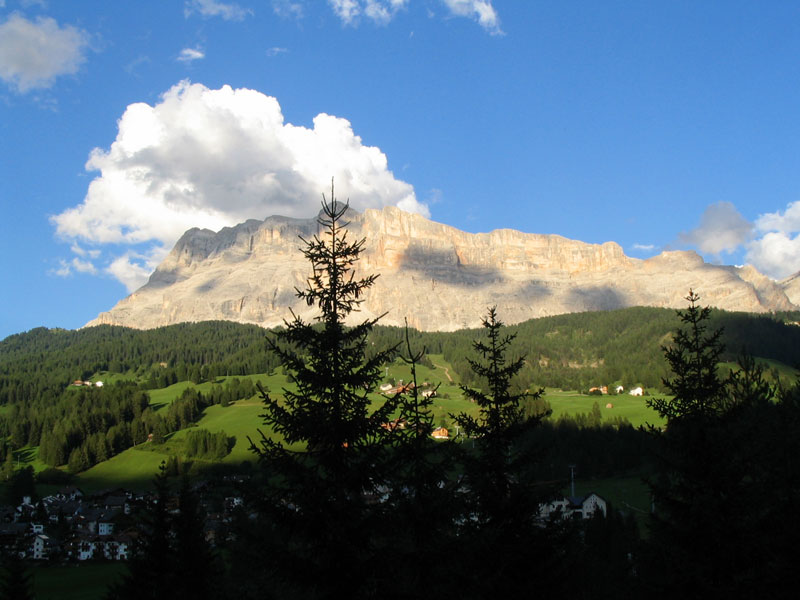
Heiligkreuzkofel in the Abteital valley
