= Rienz =

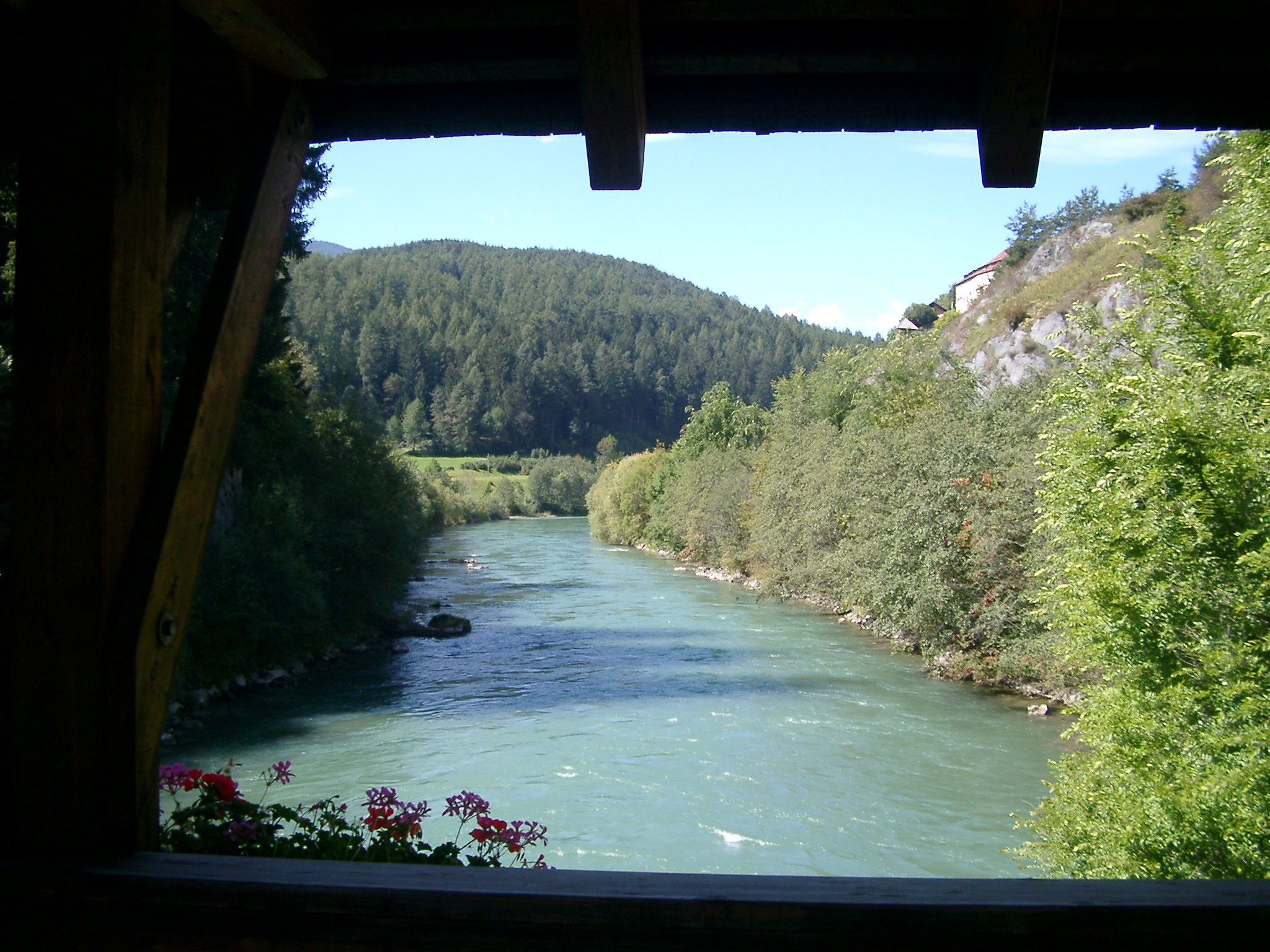
- The Rienz river, near St. Lorenzen

Location
- Country: Italy

Physical characteristics
- Source
  - location: Sexten Dolomites
  - coordinates: 46°38′03″N 12°17′55″E
  - elevation: 2,180 m (7,150 ft)
- Mouth: Eisack at Brixen
  - coordinates: 46.7129°N 11.6606°E
- Length: approx. 80 km (50 mi)

Basin features
- Progression: Eisack→ Adige→ Adriatic Sea

The Rienz (German pronunciation: [ˈriːɛnts]; Italian: Rienza [riˈɛntsa]) is a river in South Tyrol, Italy. Its source is located at 2,180 m of altitude, in the Dolomites mountains, south of Toblach: near Toblach it enters the Puster Valley, and, after 90 km (56 mi), it meets the Eisack river in the city of Brixen, at 550 m of altitude.

The Rienz flows through the following municipalities (source to mouth): Toblach, Niederdorf, Welsberg-Taisten, Olang, Rasen-Antholz, Bruneck, St. Lorenzen, Kiens, Vintl, Mühlbach, Rodeneck and Brixen.

The most significant affluents are:

- Ahr, forming the Ahrntal and responsible of 1/3 of the total discharge.
- Antholzer Bach.
- Gran Ega (Val Badia).
- Gsieser Bach.
- Pragser Bach.
- Pfunderer Bach.
- Wielenbach.

The maximum discharge of the Rienz is around 60 m^{3}/s.
