= Meransen =

Village in South Tyrol, Italy

Coordinates: 46.8148°N 11.6635°E

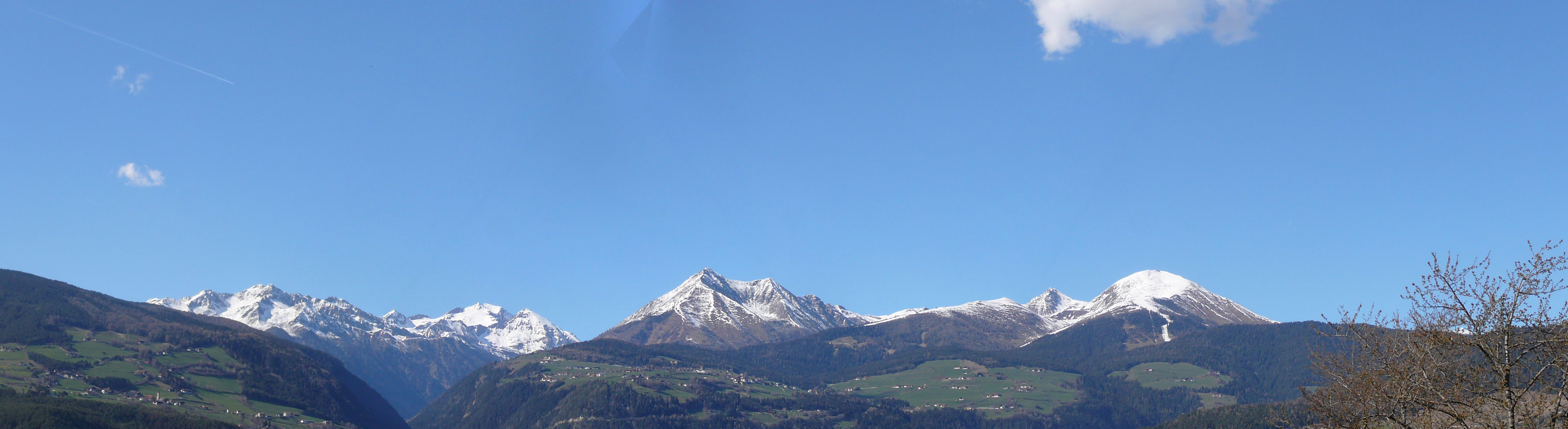
Gitschberg (far right), from the south

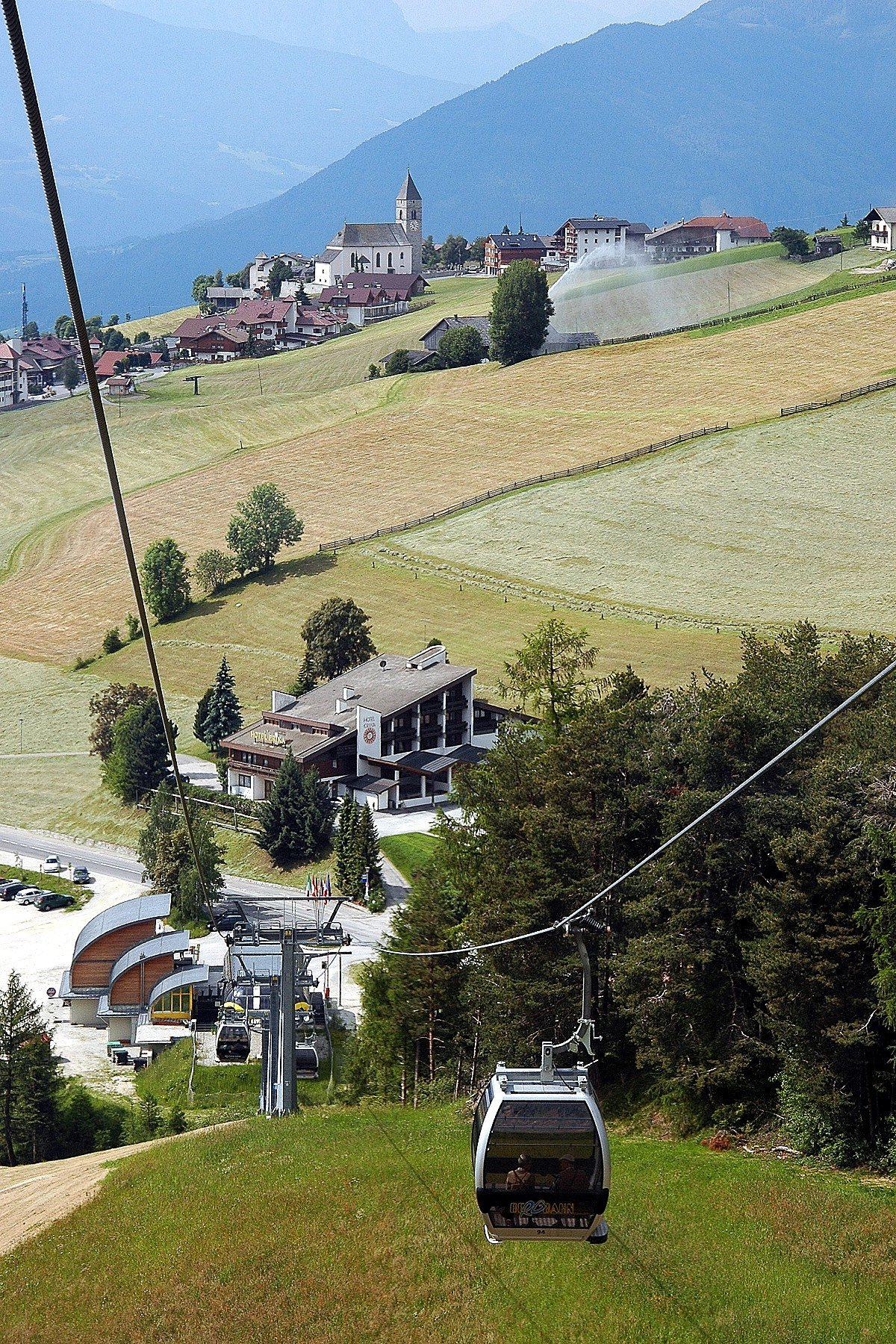
Aerial tramway at Meransen

Meransen (Italian: Maranza) is a village in South Tyrol, Italy, in the Mühlbach municipality between Pustertal and Eisacktal. It is located on the slopes of the Gitschberg mountain at an altitude of 1,414 m (4,639 ft).

The village has a population of around 850. During the winter season, the mountain is part of the Gitschberg Jochtal skiing area, which has several lifts and three aerial tramways. Meransen can be reached by motor vehicle or by the Meransner Bahn aerial tramway from Mühlbach.

The oldest documentation dates from 1200, where the village is named 'Morancin'.

The local economy is based on tourism and farming.

== Literature ==
- Karl Gruber: Aubet Cubet Quere. Die Wallfahrt zu den Heiligen Drei Jungfrauen von Meransen.
- Karl Gruber: Die Pfarrkirche von Meransen. Mit Studie von Rudolf Marini, Lana 1997.
- Josef Niedermair: Mühlbach, Meransen, Vals, Spinges, Rodeneck. Athesia, Bozen 1982, ISBN 88-7014-267-1.
- Andreas Oberhofer: Die Urkunden des Kirchenarchivs von Maranza, Dipl. masch. Innsbruck 2002.
- Hans Wielander [Hrsg.], Meransen. Ein Bildheft, Arunda. Aktuelle Südtiroler Kulturzeitschrift, 6, Schlanders 1978.
