= Wurzer =

Wurzer is a surname. Notable people with the surname include:

- Albert Wurzer, German bobsledder
- B. Wurzer, Italian luger
- Cathy Wurzer, American journalist and radio personality
- F. Wurzer, Italian luger
- Georg Wurzer (1907–1982), German football manager
