= Josef Trojer =

Italian luger

Medal record

Natural track luge

European Championships
Silver medal – second place	1973 Taisten	Men's singles

Josef Trojer was an Italian luger who competed in the 1970s. A natural track luger, he won the silver medal in the men's singles event at the 1973 FIL European Luge Natural Track Championships in Taisten, Italy.
