= Mitterstieler =

Mitterstieler is a surname. Notable people with the surname include:

- Helene Mitterstieler, Italian luger
- P. Mitterstieler, Italian luger
