= Martha Ruech =

Austrian luger

Medal record

Natural track luge

European Championships
Bronze medal – third place	1973 Taisten	Women's singles

Martha Ruech is an Austrian luger who competed during the early 1970s. A natural track luger, she won the bronze medal in the women's singles event at the 1973 FIL European Luge Natural Track Championships in Taisten, Italy.
