= Peter Votter =

Italian luger

Medal record

Natural track luge

European Championships
Gold medal – first place	1973 Taisten	Men's doubles

Peter Votter was an Italian luger.

Votter competed in the early 1970s; a natural track luger, he won a gold medal in the men's doubles event at the 1973 FIL European Luge Natural Track Championships in Taisten, Italy.
