= FIL European Luge Natural Track Championships 1973 =

The FIL European Luge Natural Track Championships 1973 took place in Taisten, Italy.

== Men's singles ==
Medal	Athlete	Time
Gold	Ernst Stangl (AUT)	
Silver	Josef Trojer (ITA)	
Bronze	Engelbert Fuchs (AUT)	

== Women's singles ==
Medal	Athlete	Time
Gold	Elfriede Pirkmann (AUT)	
Silver	Berta Pichler (AUT)	
Bronze	Martha Ruech (AUT)	

== Men's doubles ==
Medal	Athlete	Time
Gold	Italy (P. Mitterstieler, P. Votter)	
Silver	Austria (Anton Obernosterer, Gabriel Obernosterer)	
Bronze	Italy (F. Wurzer, B. Wurzer)	

== Medal table ==
Rank	Nation	Gold	Silver	Bronze	Total
1	Austria (AUT)	2	2	2	6
2	Italy (ITA)	1	1	1	3
Totals (2 entries)		3	3	3	9
