= Pragser Bach =

Location
- Country: Italy

Physical characteristics
- Mouth: Rienz
  - location: near Welsberg
  - coordinates: 46°44′40″N 12°07′53″E
- Length: 7.1 km (4.4 mi)
- Basin size: 98 km^{2} (38 sq mi)

Basin features
- Progression: Rienz→ Eisack→ Adige→ Adriatic Sea

The Pragser Bach (Italian: Rio Braies [ˈriːo ˈbraːjes]) is a stream in South Tyrol, Italy. It flows into the Rienz near Welsberg.
