= Friedrich Wurzer =

Italian luger

Medal record

Natural track luge

European Championships
Bronze medal – third place	1973 Taisten	Men's doubles

Friedrich Wurzer was an Italian luger who competed in the early 1970s. A natural track luger, he won a bronze medal in the men's doubles event at the 1973 FIL European Luge Natural Track Championships in Taisten, Italy.
