= Gran Ega =

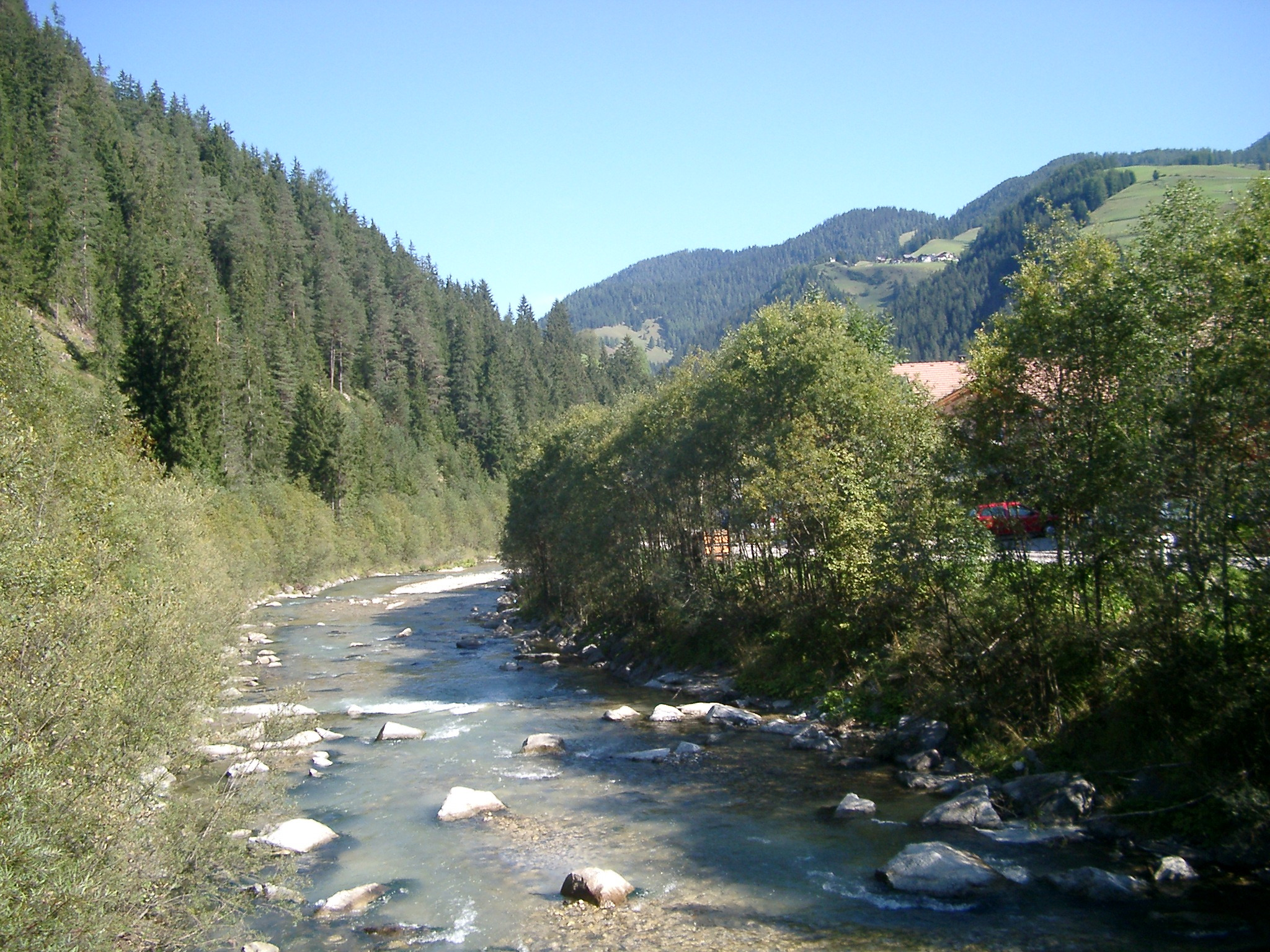
- The Gran Ega at Pederoa, La Val

Location
- Country: Italy

Physical characteristics
- Source
  - location: Val Badia (South Tyrol)
- Mouth: Rienz
  - location: St. Lorenzen
  - coordinates: 46.7843°N 11.8906°E
- Length: 34.7 km (21.6 mi)
- Basin size: 390 km^{2} (150 sq mi)

Basin features
- Progression: Rienz→ Eisack→ Adige→ Adriatic Sea

The Gran Ega (alternative Ladin name: Ghaidra; German: Gader; Italian: Gadera) is the main river of the Val Badia in South Tyrol, Italy. Its name literally translates to great water.
