= Gsieser Bach =

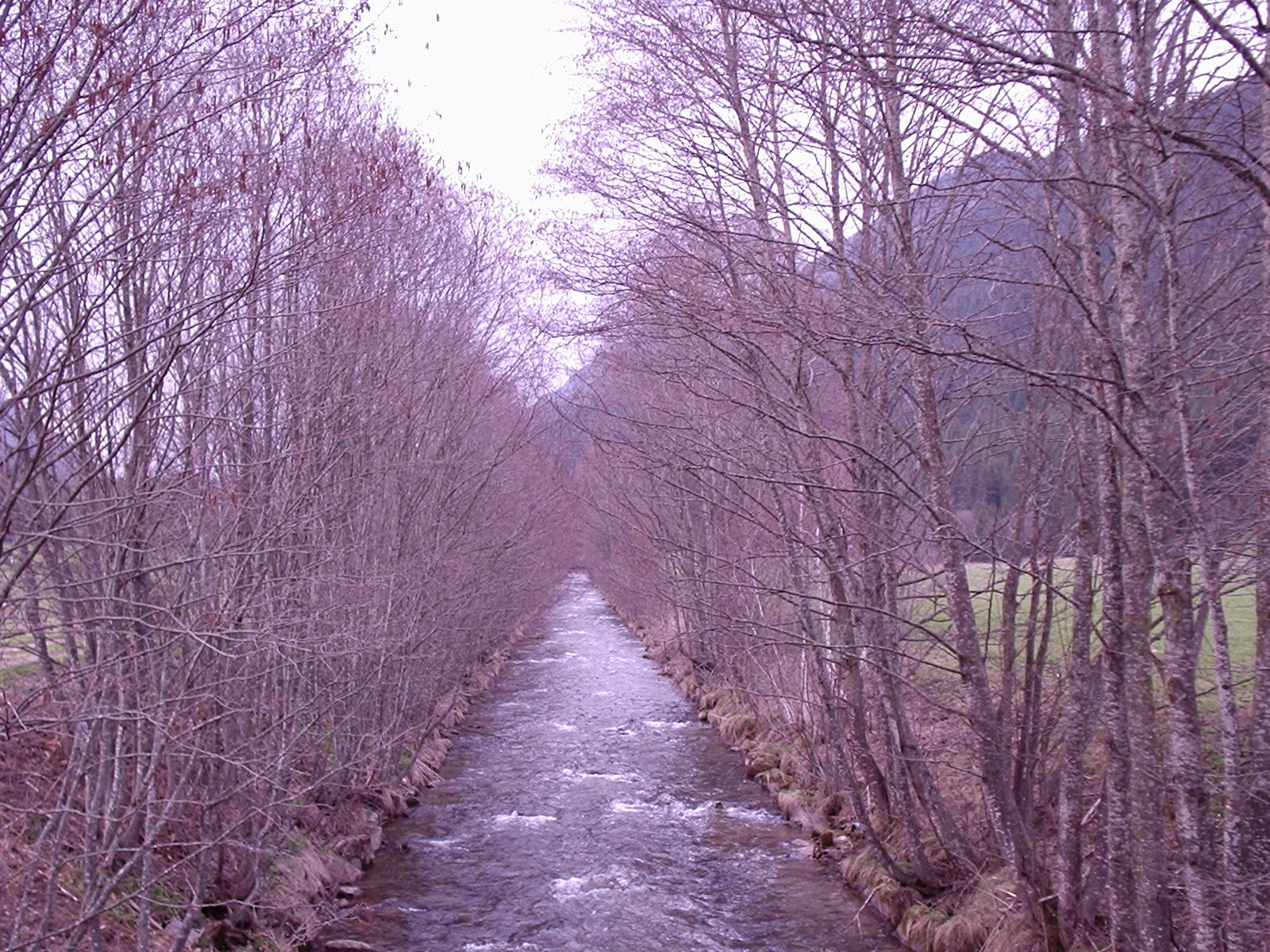

Location
- Country: Italy

Physical characteristics
- Mouth: Rienz
  - location: Welsberg
  - coordinates: 46.7597°N 12.0982°E
  - elevation: 1,071 m (3,514 ft)
- Length: 22.3 km (13.9 mi)
- Basin size: 145 km^{2} (56 sq mi)

Basin features
- Progression: Rienz→ Eisack→ Adige→ Adriatic Sea

The Gsieser Bach (Italian: Rio Casies [ˈriːo kaˈziːes]) is a stream in South Tyrol, Italy. It flows into the Rienz in Welsberg.
