= Pfunderer Bach =

Stream in South Tyrol, Italy

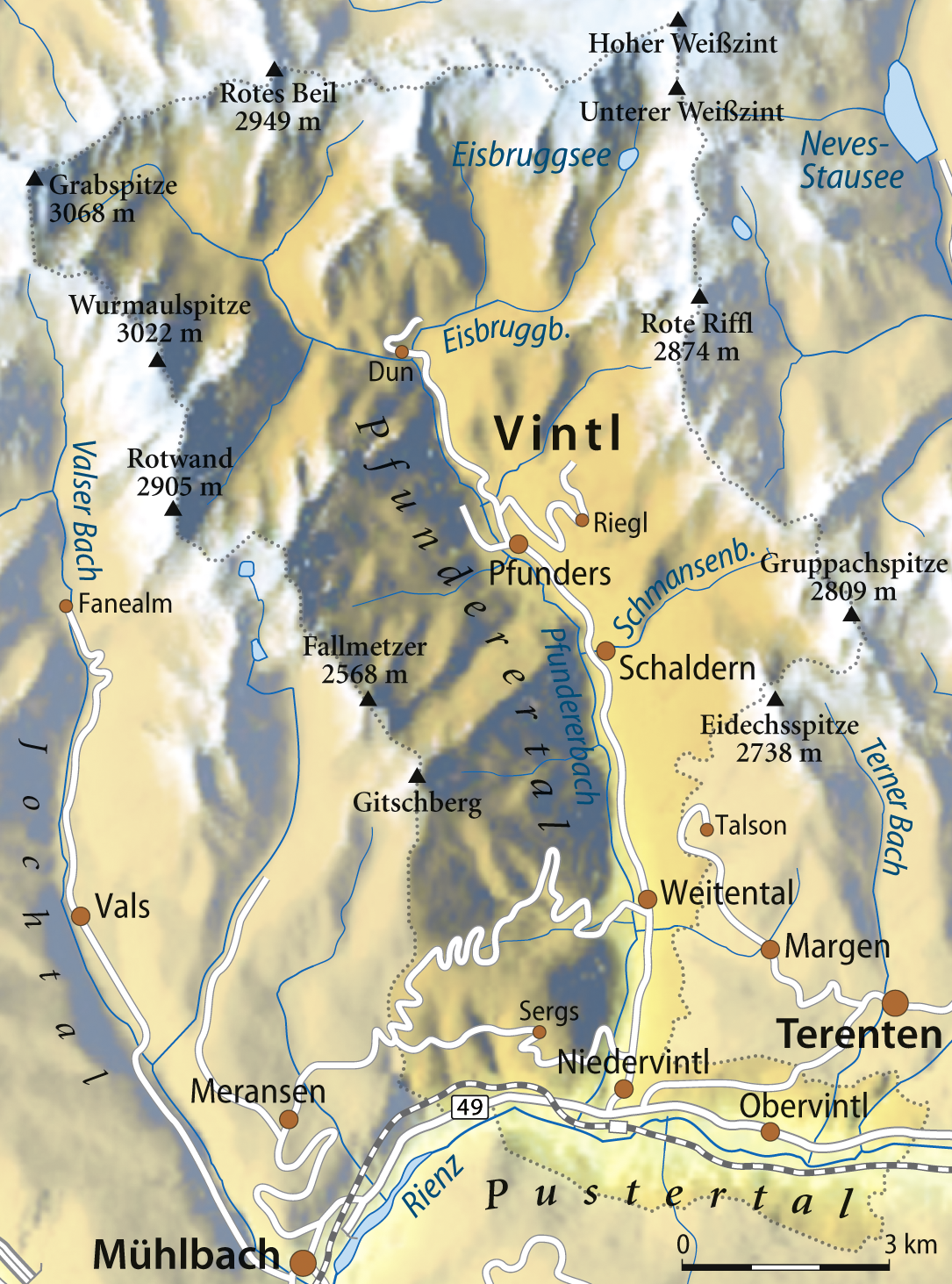

Location
- Country: Italy

Physical characteristics
- Mouth: Rienz
  - coordinates: 46.8133°N 11.7156°E
- Length: 20.8 km (12.9 mi)
- Basin size: 103 km^{2} (40 sq mi)

Basin features
- Progression: Rienz→ Eisack→ Adige→ Adriatic Sea

The Pfunderer Bach (Italian: Rio di Fundres [ˈriːo di ˈfundres]) is a stream in South Tyrol, Italy. It flows into the Rienz in Niedervintl.
