= Natz-Schabs =

- Comune
- Gemeinde Natz-Schabs; Comune di Naz-Sciaves
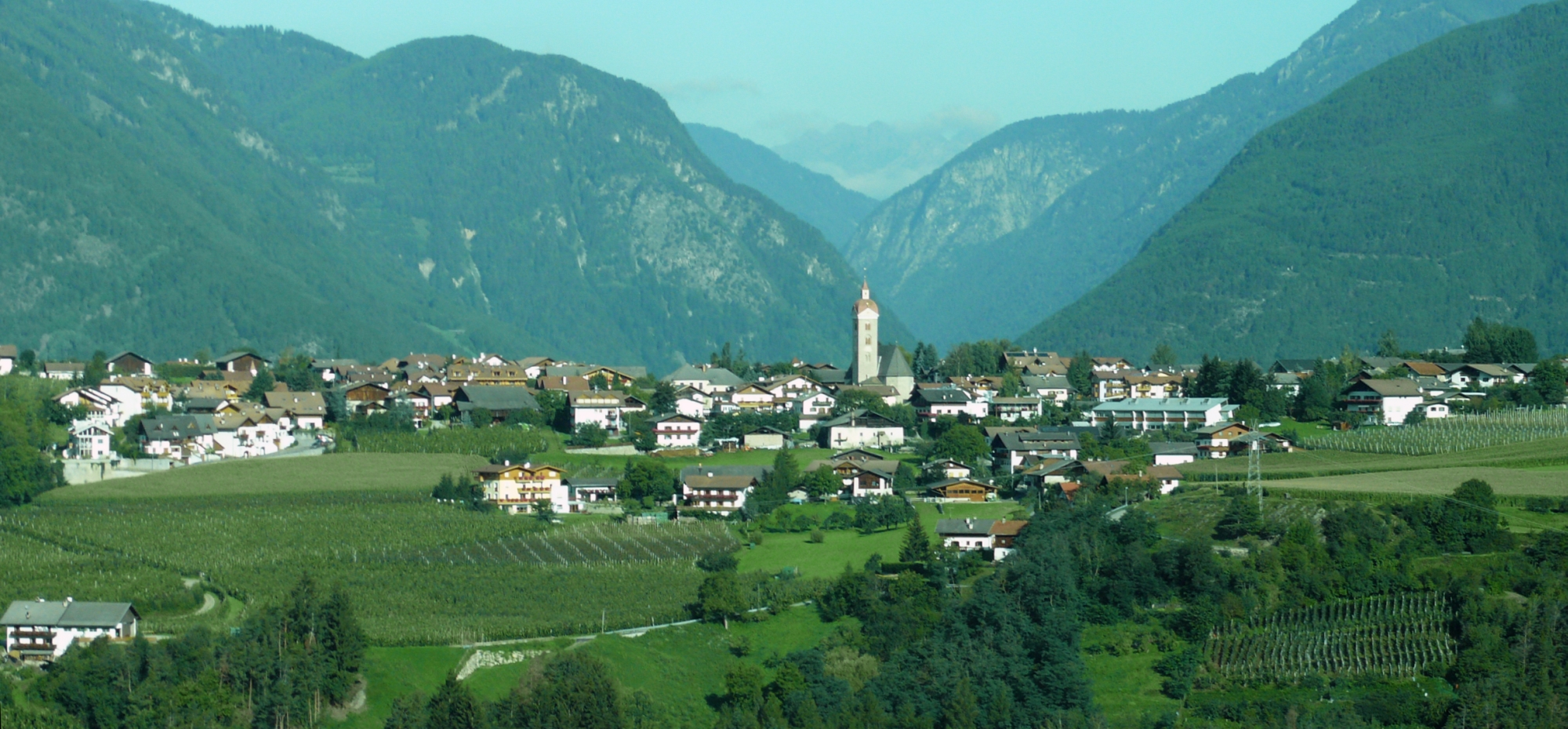
- View of Natz

- Location within Italy Location within Trentino-Alto Adige/Südtirol
- Coordinates: 46°46′N 11°40′E
- Country: Italy
- Region: Trentino-Alto Adige/Südtirol
- Province: South Tyrol (BZ)
- Frazioni: Aicha (Aica), Raas (Rasa), Viums (Fiumes)

Government
  - Mayor: Alexander Überbacher

Area
  - Total: 15.8 km^{2} (6.1 sq mi)

Population (Nov. 2010)
  - Total: 2,887
  - Density: 183/km^{2} (473/sq mi)
- Demonym(s): German: Schab(e)ser or Natzer; Italian: di Naz-Sciaves
- Time zone: UTC+1 (CET)
  - Summer (DST): UTC+2 (CEST)
- Postal code: 39040
- Dialing code: 0472
- Website: Official website

Natz-Schabs (German pronunciation: [nats-ʃaps]; Italian: Naz-Sciaves [natsˈʃaːves]) is a comune (municipality) in South Tyrol in northern Italy, located about 40 kilometres (25 mi) northeast of the city of Bolzano.

Pope Benedict XVI, whose maternal grandmother and great grandmother were born there, became an honorary citizen of the city in October 2011.

== Geography ==
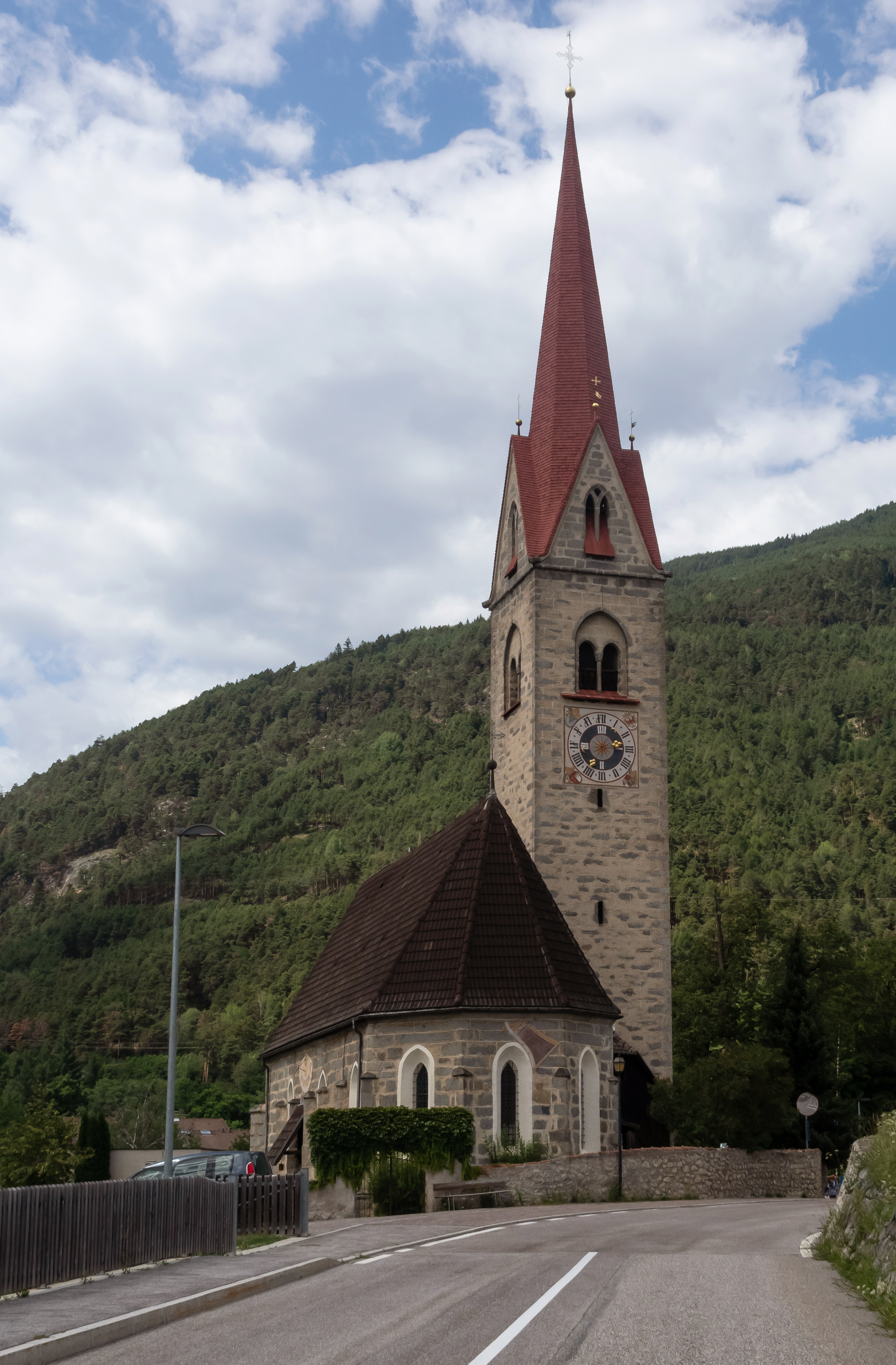
St. Margareth in Aicha

As of 30 November 2010, it had a population of 2,887 and an area of 15.8 square kilometres (6.1 mi^{2}).

Natz-Schabs borders the following municipalities: Brixen, Franzensfeste, Lüsen, Mühlbach, Rodeneck, and Vahrn.

=== Frazioni ===
The municipality of Natz-Schabs contains the frazioni (subdivisions, mainly villages and hamlets) Aicha (Aica), Natz (Naz), Raas (Rasa), Schabs (Sciaves) and Viums (Fiumes).

== History ==
=== Coat-of-arms ===
The emblem is party per fess of gules and argent. The upper part show the head of a heron, from which comes out gules flames in the bottom. It is the sign of the Lords of Sebs und Lyne who lived in the village since 1147 and afterwards changed the name to Schabs. The emblem appeared for the first time in 1365 and was granted in 1966.

== Main sights ==
=== Religious architecture ===
==== Schabs Parish church "Saint Margareth" ====
The Late Gothic parish church was consecrated in 1281 but the construction was completed only in 1454 and in the late 18th century the interior was restored in baroque. The side chapel was built in 1681 and contains interesting paintings by Kessler. In 2002 the church was enlarged extending the nave with a prominent portal. The slim bell tower is 72 metres (236 ft) high.

==== Natz Parish church Saints Philip and James ====
The first mention of the parish church in Natz dates back to 1157 but the church was consecrated in 1208 by the prince-bishop Konrad von Rodank in honour of Saint Philip and Saint Walpurga. The present church was completed in 1484 in Late Gothic and consecrated once again to the Saints Apostles Philip and James. The bell tower was built in 1400 with granite blocks; in 1635 was damaged by fire and in 1686 was covered with a dome in Baroque style. The high altar is work by Peter Lapper of Natz made in 1855. In the throne of the high altar are the statue of the Madonna, Saint Agnes and Saint Ursula which are Gothic works of 1499 attributed to Michael Parcher; the statues of St. Philip and St. James are by F. X. Renn of Imst made in 1857. The painting of the right lateral altar represent the Baptism of Jesus and the left side altar correspond to the Holy Family, both works are by Michael Lackner of Bruneck. The first organ was installed on May 1, 1909; the present one has been built by Orgelbau Pirchner of Steinach am Brenner and has 16 registers and 1250 pipes and was inaugurated on May 1, 1990.

==== Aicha church St. Nikolaus ====
According to the tradition, a chapel was built in 1400. The present church, surrounded by the churchyard, was built in the late 16th century next to a large linden. Above the main entrance, repaired by a porch, is a fresco attributed to Friedrich Pacher. The painting at the high altar shows Saint Nicholas, Saint Catherine and Saint Oswald ascribed to Johann Mitterwurzer.

== Society ==
=== Linguistic distribution ===
According to the 2024 census, 94.61% of the population speak German, 4.42% Italian and 0.96% Ladin as first language.

=== Demographic evolution ===
Historical population

Year	Pop.	±%
1861	?	—
1871	?	—
1881	?	—
1901	?	—
1911	?	—

Year	Pop.	±%
1921	1,072	—
1931	1,131	+5.5%
1936	1,141	+0.9%
1951	1,156	+1.3%
1961	1,207	+4.4%

Year	Pop.	±%
1971	1,297	+7.5%
1981	1,610	+24.1%
1991	2,051	+27.4%
2001	2,430	+18.5%

Source: Data from ISTAT
