= P. Mitterstieler =

Italian luger

Medal record

Natural track luge

European Championships
Gold medal – first place	1973 Taisten	Men's doubles

P. Mitterstieler was an Italian luger who competed in the early 1970s. A natural track luger, he won a gold medal in the men's doubles event at the 1973 FIL European Luge Natural Track Championships in Taisten, Italy.
