= Kiens =

- Comune
- Gemeinde Kiens; Comune di Chienes
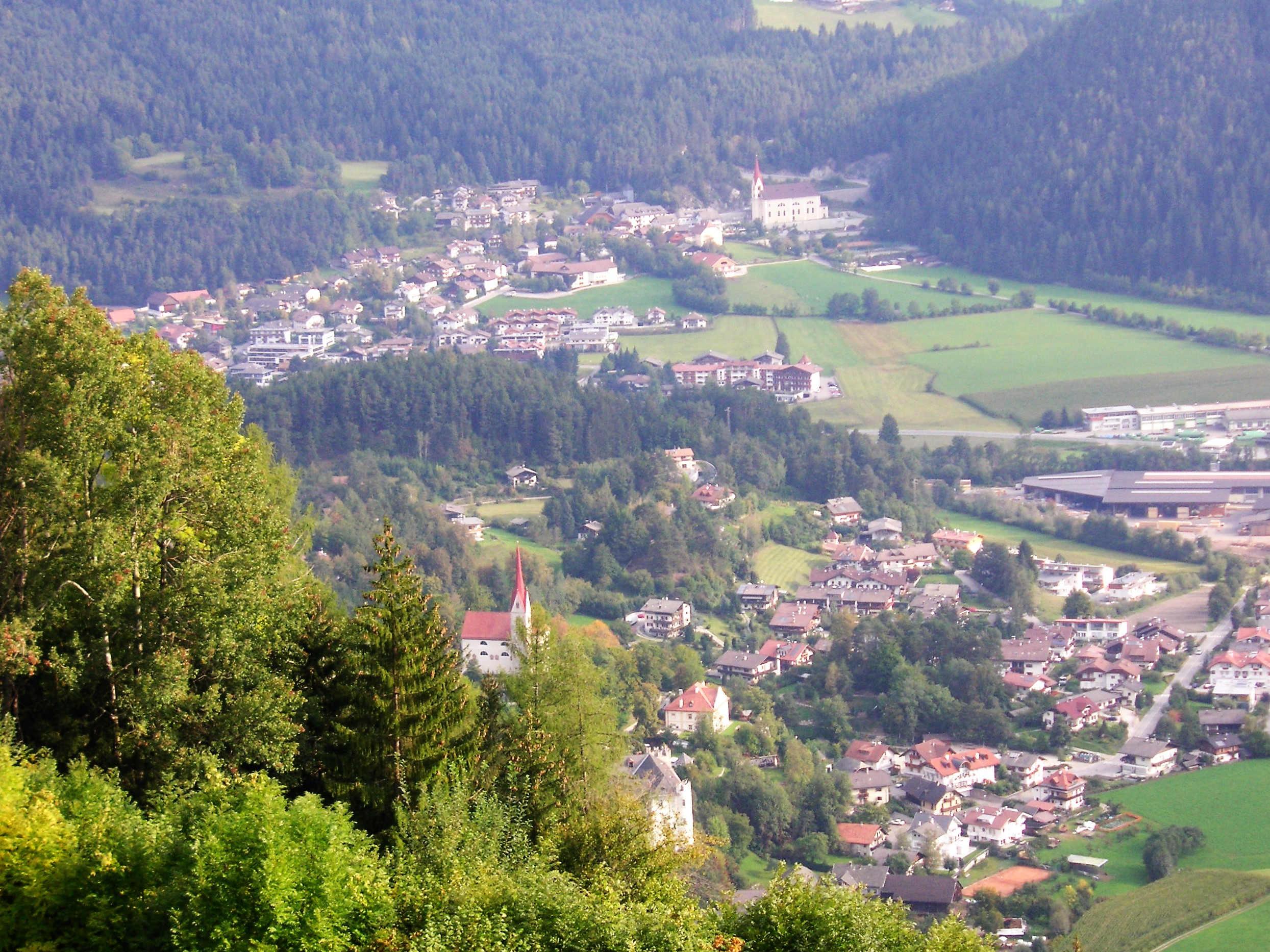
- View of Kiens

- Coat of arms

- Location within Italy Location within Trentino-Alto Adige/Südtirol
- Coordinates: 46°49′N 11°50′E
- Country: Italy
- Region: Trentino-Alto Adige/Südtirol
- Province: South Tyrol (BZ)
- Frazioni: Ehrenburg (Casteldarne), Getzenberg (Monghezzo), Hofern (Corti), St. Sigmund (San Sigismondo)

Government
  - Mayor: Markus Mitterhofer

Area
  - Total: 33.9 km^{2} (13.1 sq mi)

Population (Nov. 2010)
  - Total: 2,726
  - Density: 80.4/km^{2} (208/sq mi)
- Demonym(s): German: Kiener; Italian: di Chienes
- Time zone: UTC+1 (CET)
  - Summer (DST): UTC+2 (CEST)
- Postal code: 39030
- Dialing code: 0474
- Website: Official website

Kiens (Austrian German: [ˈkiːɛns]; Italian: Chienes [ˈkjɛːnes]) is a comune (municipality) and a village in South Tyrol in northern Italy, located about 50 kilometres (31 mi) northeast of Bolzano.

== Geography ==
As of 30 November 2010, it had a population of 2,726 and an area of 33.9 square kilometres (13.1 mi^{2}).

Kiens borders the following municipalities: Pfalzen, Rodeneck, St. Lorenzen, Mühlwald, Terenten and Vintl.

=== Frazioni ===
The municipality of Kiens contains the frazioni (subdivisions, mainly villages and hamlets) Ehrenburg (Casteldarne), Getzenberg (Monghezzo), Hofern (Corti) and St. Sigmund (San Sigismondo).

== History ==
The hamlet appears for the first time in the Freising book of traditions (Traditionsbuch) in a deed issued in the years 1005—39 as ″locus Kiehna″.

=== Coat-of-arms ===
The emblem is based on that of the family Schöneck; on gules a curved pile argent. In the right corner take place a five-pointed argent star, symbolizing the five villages in the municipality. The emblem was adopted in 1961.

== Society ==
=== Linguistic distribution ===
According to the 2024 census, 92.61% of the population speak German, 6.11% Italian and 1.28% Ladin as first language.

=== Demographic evolution ===
Historical population

Year	Pop.	±%
1861	?	—
1871	?	—
1881	?	—
1901	?	—
1911	?	—

Year	Pop.	±%
1921	1,479	—
1931	1,594	+7.8%
1936	1,696	+6.4%
1951	1,750	+3.2%
1961	1,948	+11.3%

Year	Pop.	±%
1971	2,198	+12.8%
1981	2,410	+9.6%
1991	2,476	+2.7%
2001	2,641	+6.7%

Source: Data from ISTAT

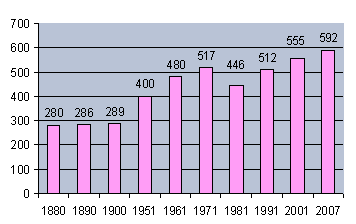
Source:

== St. Sigmund ==
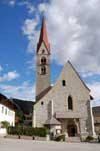
St. Sigmund parish church

St. Sigmund is a frazione of Kiens, its origins date back to 1050, when first it was called Burin and after Peuren, in 1317.

The town is located where the valley widens into a large flat area, for that reason it enjoys excellent weather conditions throughout the year.

From an architectural point of view, the buildings in the area are based on original South Tyrolean farmsteads style. Especially is notable the parish church (1449–89), where is present the oldest and best preserved altar in Tyrol, dated around 1430. Another point of interest is the Church of Our Lady (German: Stöcklkapelle) dating back to 1621 and built in Baroque style. Behind the railway station, in the river Rienz, there are the Ilstern thermal baths (German: Bad Ilstern), which once featured facilities for cures. Also in this area is the church of St. Ulrich that dates back to 1491 and is well preserved.
