= Terenten =

- Comune
- Gemeinde Terenten; Comune di Terento
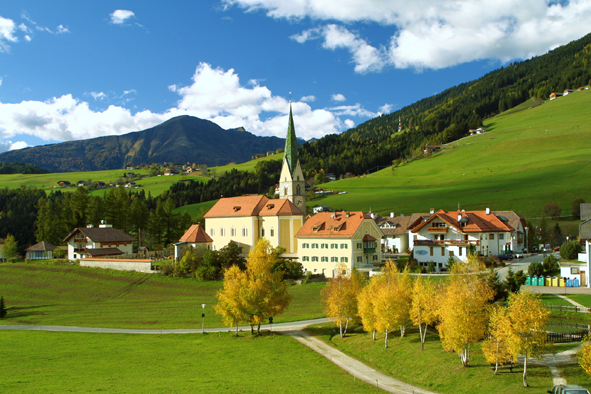
- Parish church of Saint George

- Coat of arms

- Location within Italy Location within Trentino-Alto Adige/Südtirol
- Coordinates: 46°50′N 11°47′E
- Country: Italy
- Region: Trentino-Alto Adige/Südtirol
- Province: South Tyrol (BZ)
- Frazioni: Pichlern (Colli in Pusteria)

Government
  - Mayor: Reinhold Weger

Area
  - Total: 42.5 km^{2} (16.4 sq mi)
- Elevation: 1,210 m (3,970 ft)

Population (Dec. 2015)
  - Total: 1,743
  - Density: 41.0/km^{2} (106/sq mi)
- Demonym(s): German: Terentner; Italian: di Terento
- Time zone: UTC+1 (CET)
  - Summer (DST): UTC+2 (CEST)
- Postal code: 39030
- Dialing code: 0472
- Website: Official website

Terenten (German pronunciation: [ˈterɛntn̩]; Italian: Terento [teˈrento]) is a comune (municipality) in South Tyrol in northern Italy, located about 50 kilometres (31 mi) northeast of Bolzano.

== Geography ==
As of December 31, 2015, it had a population of 1,743 and an area of 42.5 square kilometres (16.4 mi^{2}).

The municipality of Terenten contains the frazione (subdivision) Pichlern (Colli in Pusteria).

Terenten borders the following municipalities: Kiens, Mühlwald, and Vintl.

== History ==
=== Coat-of-arms ===
The emblem represents a sable plough on gules background; it is the symbol of the local agriculture. The arms were granted in 1969.

== Society ==
=== Linguistic distribution ===
According to the 2024 census, 99.05% of the population speak German, 0.71% Italian and 0.24% Ladin as first language.

=== Demographic evolution ===
Historical population

Year	Pop.	±%
1861	?	—
1871	?	—
1881	?	—
1901	?	—
1911	?	—

Year	Pop.	±%
1921	974	—
1931	1,007	+3.4%
1936	1,069	+6.2%
1951	1,067	−0.2%
1961	1,120	+5.0%

Year	Pop.	±%
1971	1,194	+6.6%
1981	1,324	+10.9%
1991	1,433	+8.2%
2001	1,572	+9.7%

Source: Data from ISTAT
