= Antholzer Bach =

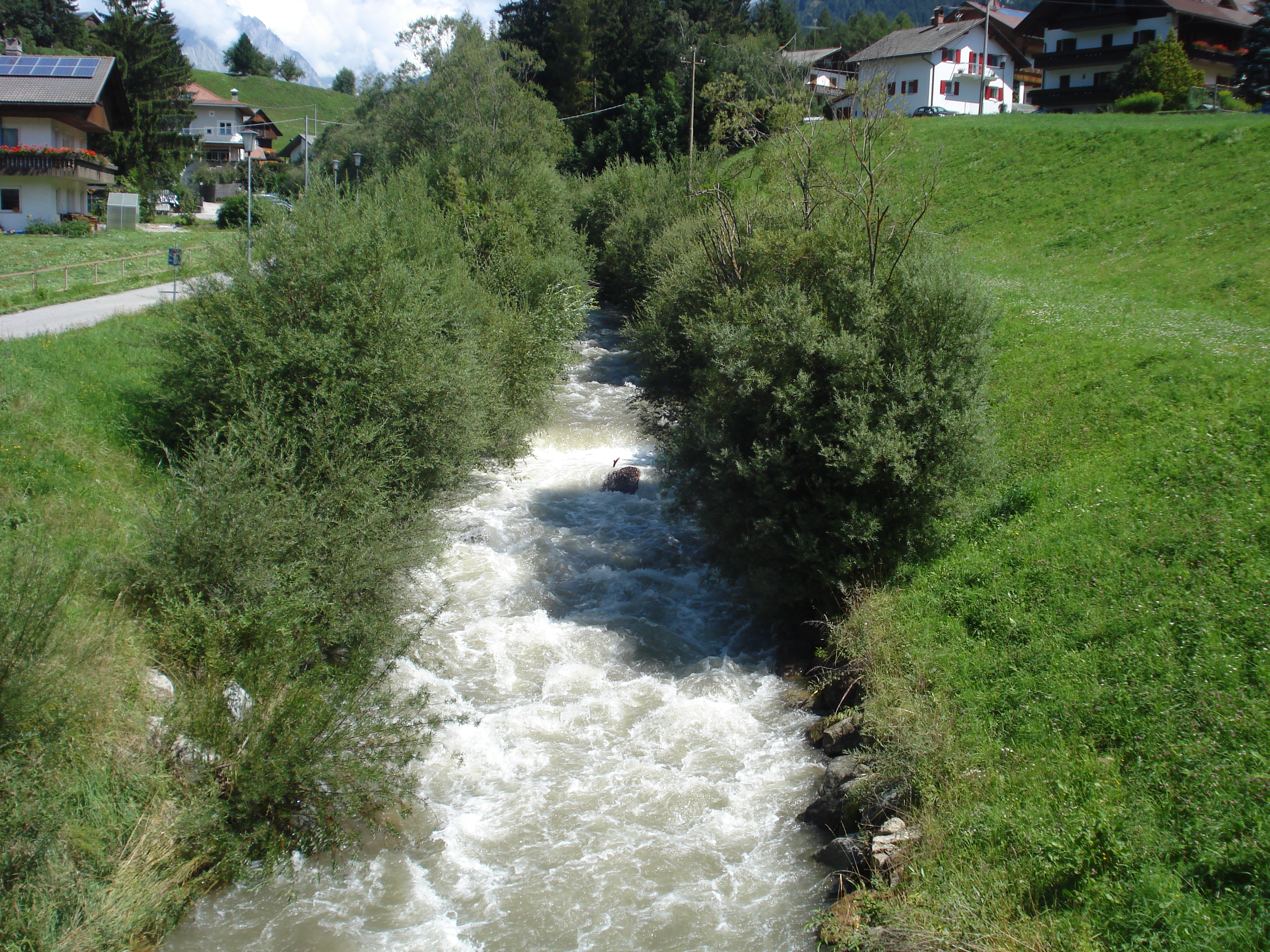

Location
- Country: Italy

Physical characteristics
- Source
  - location: Antholzer Tal
- Mouth: Rienz
  - coordinates: 46.7725°N 12.0278°E
  - elevation: 990 m (3,250 ft)
- Length: 24.6 km (15.3 mi)
- Basin size: 112 km^{2} (43 sq mi)

Basin features
- Progression: Rienz→ Eisack→ Adige→ Adriatic Sea

The Antholzer Bach (also German: Antholzerbach; Italian: Rio Anterselva [ˈriːo ˌanterˈselva]) is a stream in South Tyrol, Italy.
