= Lüsen =

- Comune
- Gemeinde Lüsen; Comune di Luson
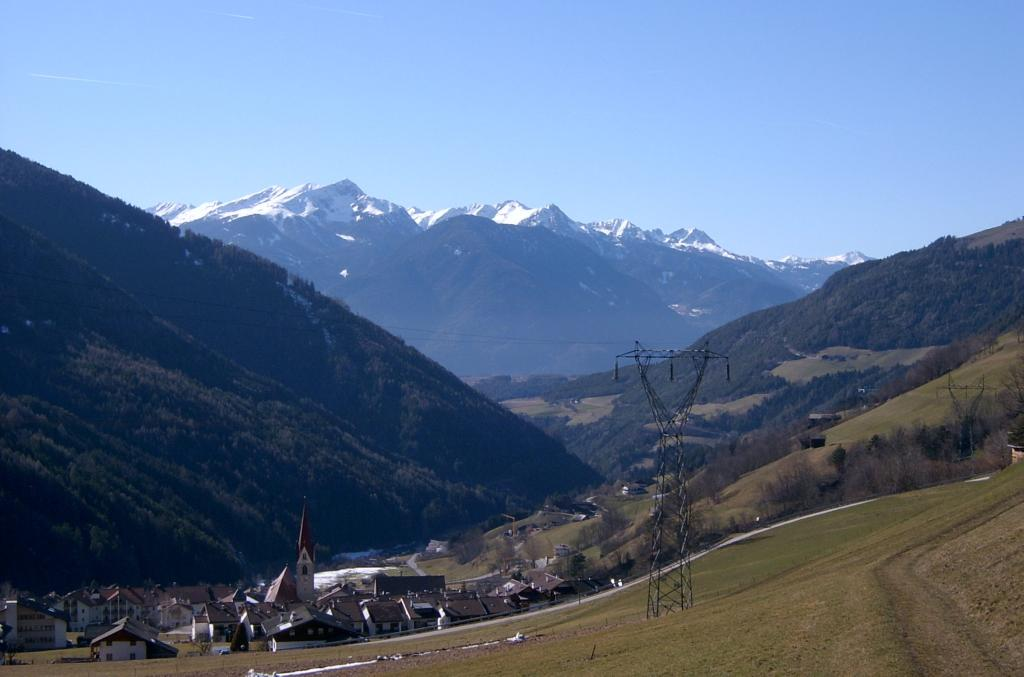
- View of Lüsen

- Location within Italy Location within Trentino-Alto Adige/Südtirol
- Coordinates: 46°45′N 11°46′E
- Country: Italy
- Region: Trentino-Alto Adige/Südtirol
- Province: South Tyrol (BZ)
- Frazioni: Berg (Monte), Petschied (Pezzè), Rungg (Ronco), Flitt (Valletta)

Government
  - Mayor: Carmen Plaseller

Area
  - Total: 74.2 km^{2} (28.6 sq mi)
- Elevation: 962 m (3,156 ft)

Population (Nov. 2010)
  - Total: 1,543
  - Density: 20.8/km^{2} (53.9/sq mi)
- Demonym(s): German:Lüsner; Italian: di Luson
- Time zone: UTC+1 (CET)
  - Summer (DST): UTC+2 (CEST)
- Postal code: 39040
- Dialing code: 0472
- Website: Official website

Lüsen (German: [ˈlyːsn̩]; Italian: Luson [luˈzon]) is a comune (municipality) and a village in South Tyrol, located about 40 kilometres (25 mi) northeast of Bolzano.

== Geography ==
As of 30 November 2010, it had a population of 1,543 and an area of 74.2 square kilometres (28.6 mi^{2}).

Lüsen (Luson) borders the following municipalities: Brixen, Mareo, Natz-Schabs, Rodeneck, St. Lorenzen, and San Martin de Tor.

=== Frazioni ===
The municipality of Lüsen (Luson) contains the frazioni (subdivisions, mainly villages and hamlets) Berg (Monte), Petschied (Pezzè), Rungg (Ronco) and Flitt (Valletta).

== History ==
=== Coat-of-arms ===
The emblem represents a knight in armor, with plumes, lance in rest on a horse facing left, both of argent on gules. The emblem, adopted in 1967, resumes an arms used by the administration of the Bishops of Brixen since 1607.

== Society ==
=== Linguistic distribution ===
According to the 2024 census, 97.61% of the population speak German, 1.97% Italian and 0.42% Ladin as first language.

=== Demographic evolution ===
Historical population

Year	Pop.	±%
1861	?	—
1871	?	—
1881	?	—
1901	?	—
1911	?	—

Year	Pop.	±%
1921	1,119	—
1931	1,158	+3.5%
1936	1,254	+8.3%
1951	1,205	−3.9%
1961	1,390	+15.4%

Year	Pop.	±%
1971	1,358	−2.3%
1981	1,366	+0.6%
1991	1,373	+0.5%
2001	1,455	+6.0%

Source: Data from ISTAT
