= Rodeneck =

- Comune
- Gemeinde Rodeneck; Comune di Rodengo
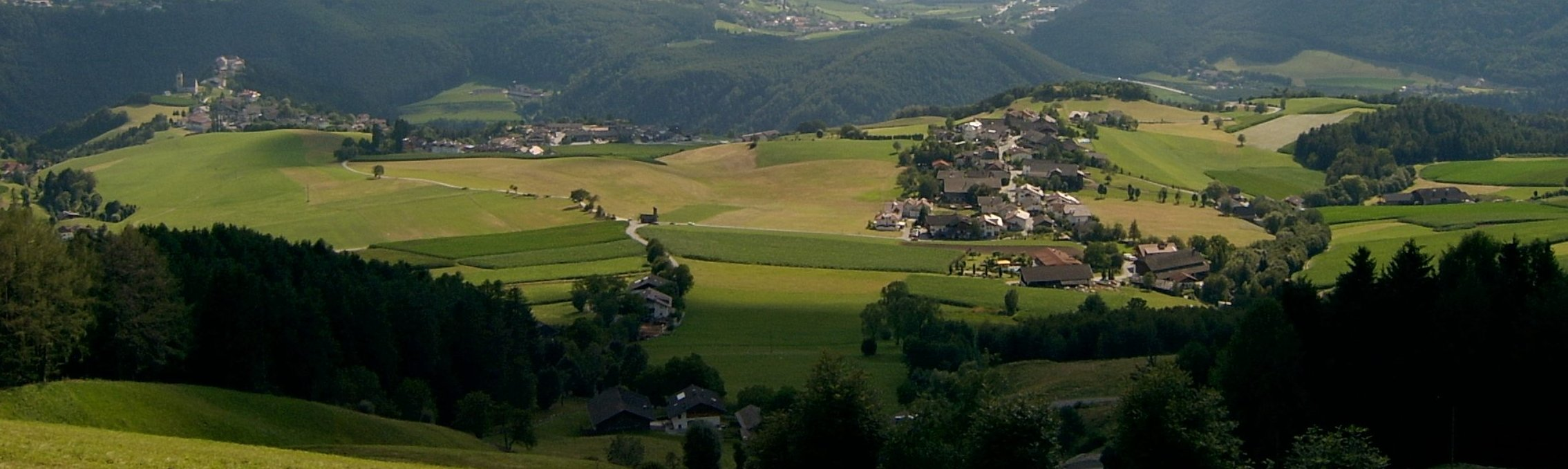
- View of Rodeneck

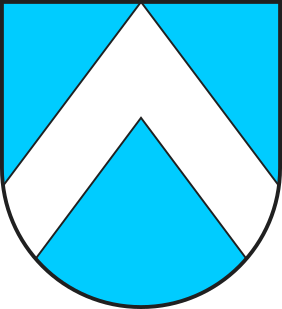
- Coat of arms

- Location within Italy Location within Trentino-Alto Adige/Südtirol
- Coordinates: 46°47′N 11°41′E
- Country: Italy
- Region: Trentino-Alto Adige/Südtirol
- Province: South Tyrol (BZ)
- Frazioni: Ahnerberg, Fröllerberg (Frella), Gifen (Chivo), Nauders, Spisses (Spissa), Sankt Pauls (San Paolo), Vill (Villa)

Government
  - Mayor: Helmut Achmüller

Area
  - Total: 29 km^{2} (11 sq mi)
- Elevation: 885 m (2,904 ft)

Population (Nov. 2010)
  - Total: 1,184
  - Density: 41/km^{2} (110/sq mi)
- Demonym(s): German: Rodenecker; Italian: di Rodengo
- Time zone: UTC+1 (CET)
  - Summer (DST): UTC+2 (CEST)
- Postal code: 39037
- Dialing code: 0472
- Website: Official website

Rodeneck (German: [ˈroːdənɛk]; Italian: Rodengo [roˈdeŋɡo, roˈdɛŋɡo]) is a comune (municipality) and a village in South Tyrol in northern Italy.

== Geography ==
Rodeneck borders the following municipalities: Kiens, Lüsen, Mühlbach, Natz-Schabs, St. Lorenzen and Vintl. In Rodeneck there are 7 municipal fractions: Vill, the largest and most populous fraction of the municipality, Nauders, Gifen, St. Pauls, Spisses, Ahnerberg and Fröllerberg, the municipal fraction with the fewest inhabitants

== History ==
=== Origin ===
The presence of non-local flint and quartz fragments suggests that the area was inhabited by hunters during the middle Stone Age (5000 BC). The discovery of middle Bronze Age forts dates permanent settlement to at least 1500 BC.

The community was mentioned by name for the first time in the Actum Rotungun of 1050–1065 AD as a place that has made donations to the bishop. In the following centuries, the name has appeared in a variety of forms. Between 1140 and 1147, Bishop Hartmann of Brixen made the town an alod and bestowed it upon his ministerialis Frederick II and his wife Gerbirg, who built a castle there.

At the start of the 19th century, Rodeneck became a municipality, administered by a mayor since 1822. In 1926, the municipality lost its autonomy and became part of the municipality of Mühlbach, and then winning back its independence in 1955 after a long struggle.

=== Coat-of-arms ===
The emblem is azure a chevron argent. It is the insignia of the Lords of Rodank who built the Rodenegg Castle in 1140. The coat of arms was granted in 1969.

== Society ==
=== Linguistic distribution ===
According to the 2024 census, 98.86% of the population speak German, 0.98% Italian and 0.16% Ladin as first language.

== Bibliography ==
- Freed, John B. (1995). Noble Bondsmen: Ministerial Marriages in the Archdiocese of Salzburg, 1100–1343. (Ithaca, NY: Cornell University Press).
