= Gitschberg =

Mountain in Italy

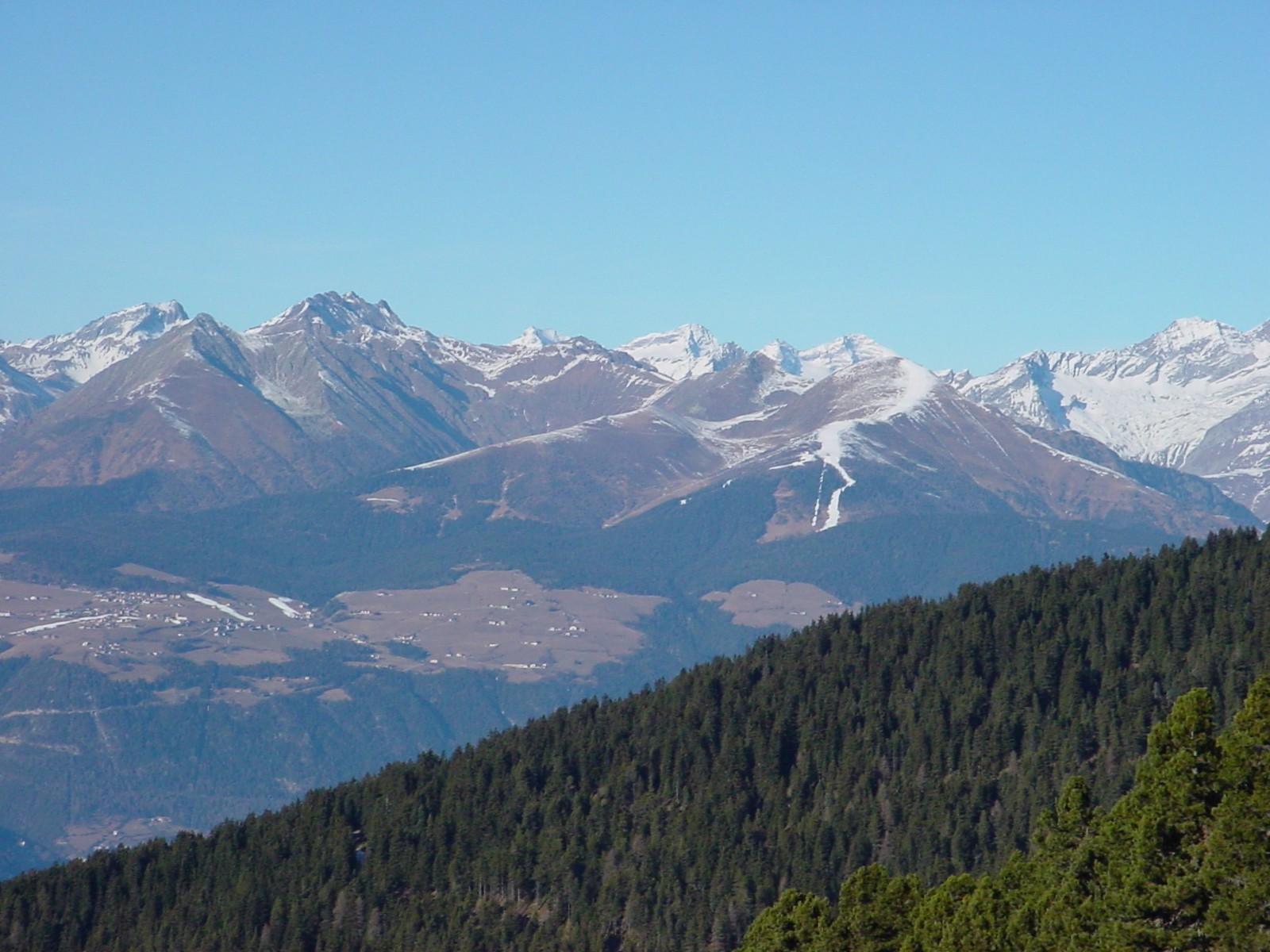

Highest point
- Elevation: 2,510 m (8,230 ft)
- Coordinates: 46°51′36″N 11°41′13″E

Geography
- Location: South Tyrol, Italy
- Parent range: Zillertal Alps

The Gitschberg is a mountain of the Zillertal Alps in South Tyrol, Italy.
