= Mühlbach, South Tyrol =

Mühlbach
- Comune
- Marktgemeinde Mühlbach; Comune di Rio di Pusteria
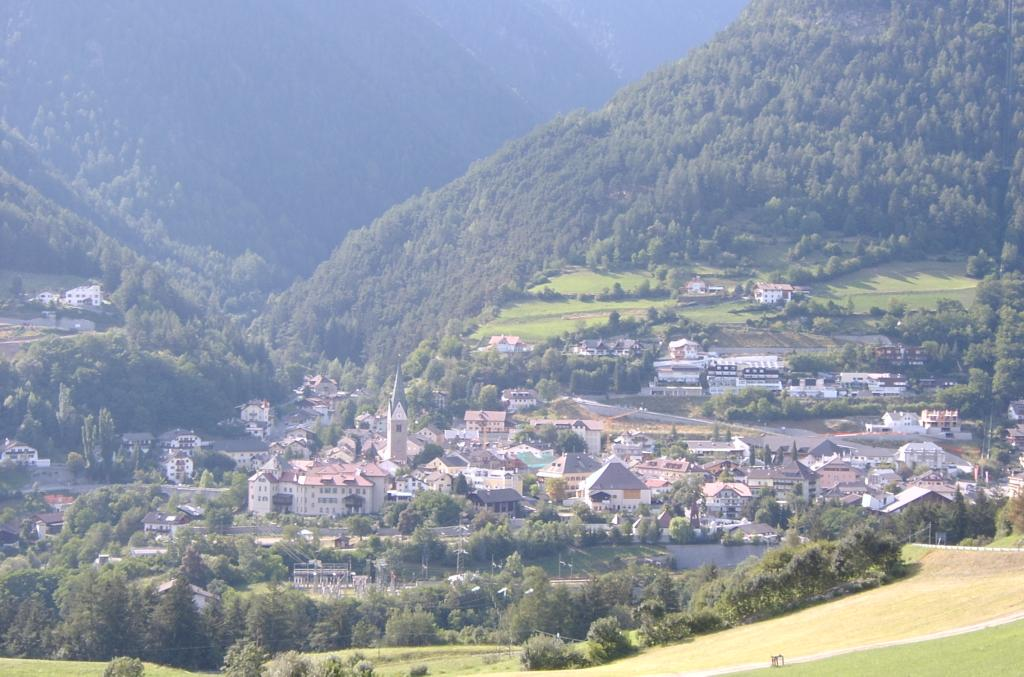
- View of Mühlbach

- Location within Italy Location within Trentino-Alto Adige/Südtirol
- Coordinates: 46°48′N 11°40′E
- Country: Italy
- Region: Trentino-Alto Adige/Südtirol
- Province: South Tyrol (BZ)
- Frazioni: Meransen (Maranza), Spinges (Spinga), Vals (Valles)

Government
  - Mayor: Heinrich Seppi

Area
  - Total: 84.1 km^{2} (32.5 sq mi)

Population (Nov. 2010)
  - Total: 2,955
  - Density: 35.1/km^{2} (91.0/sq mi)
- Demonym(s): German: Mühlbacher; Italian: di Rio Pusteria
- Time zone: UTC+1 (CET)
  - Summer (DST): UTC+2 (CEST)
- Postal code: 39037
- Dialing code: 0472
- Website: Official website

Mühlbach (German pronunciation: [ˈmyːlbax]; Italian: Rio di Pusteria [ˈriːo di pusteˈriːa]) is a comune (municipality) and a village on the Rienz in South Tyrol in northern Italy, located about 40 kilometres (25 mi) northeast of Bolzano.

== Geography ==
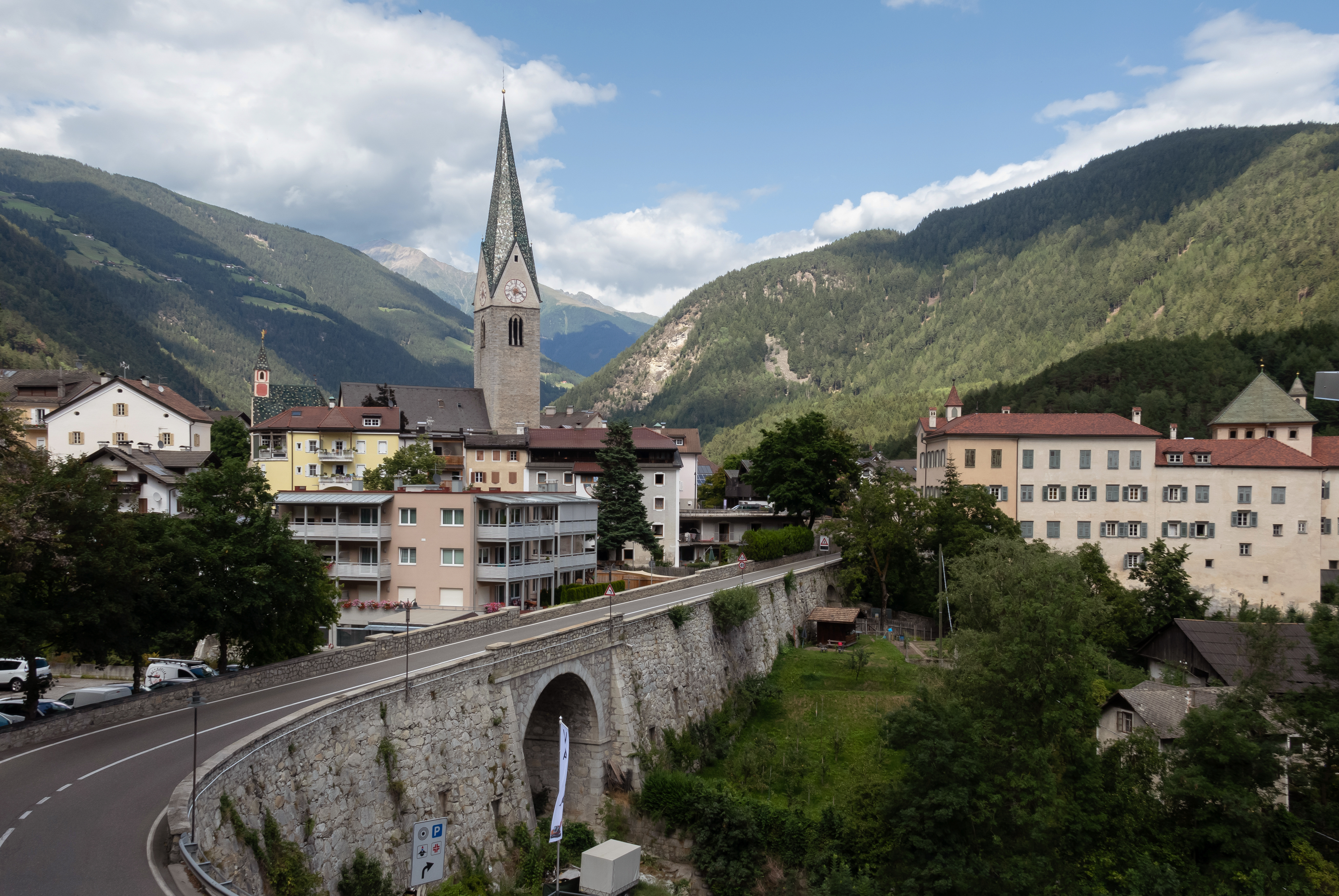
Mühlbach, church in the village

As of 30 November 2010, it had a population of 2,955 and an area of 84.1 square kilometres (32.5 mi^{2}).

The municipality of Mühlbach contains the frazioni (subdivisions, mainly villages and hamlets): Meransen (Maranza), Spinges (Spinga), Vals (Valles).

Mühlbach borders the following municipalities: Freienfeld, Franzensfeste, Natz-Schabs, Rodeneck, Pfitsch, and Vintl.

== History ==
=== Coat-of-arms ===
The emblem is crossed diagonally by an argent wavy stream on vert; at the top a water wheel and an argent donkey at bottom. The water wheel symbolizes the water mill once numerous in the area for the grinding; the donkey represents the pack animals used for the transport. The emblem was adopted in 1971.

== Society ==
=== Linguistic distribution ===
According to the 2024 census, 93.54% of the population speak German, 5.81% Italian and 0.66% Ladin as first language.

=== Demographic evolution ===
Historical population

Year	Pop.	±%
1861	?	—
1871	?	—
1881	?	—
1901	?	—
1911	?	—

Year	Pop.	±%
1921	1,820	—
1931	1,854	+1.9%
1936	1,853	−0.1%
1951	2,020	+9.0%
1961	2,024	+0.2%

Year	Pop.	±%
1971	2,039	+0.7%
1981	2,239	+9.8%
1991	2,410	+7.6%
2001	2,640	+9.5%

Source: Data from ISTAT
