= Pfalzen =

- Comune
- Gemeinde Pfalzen; Comune di Falzes
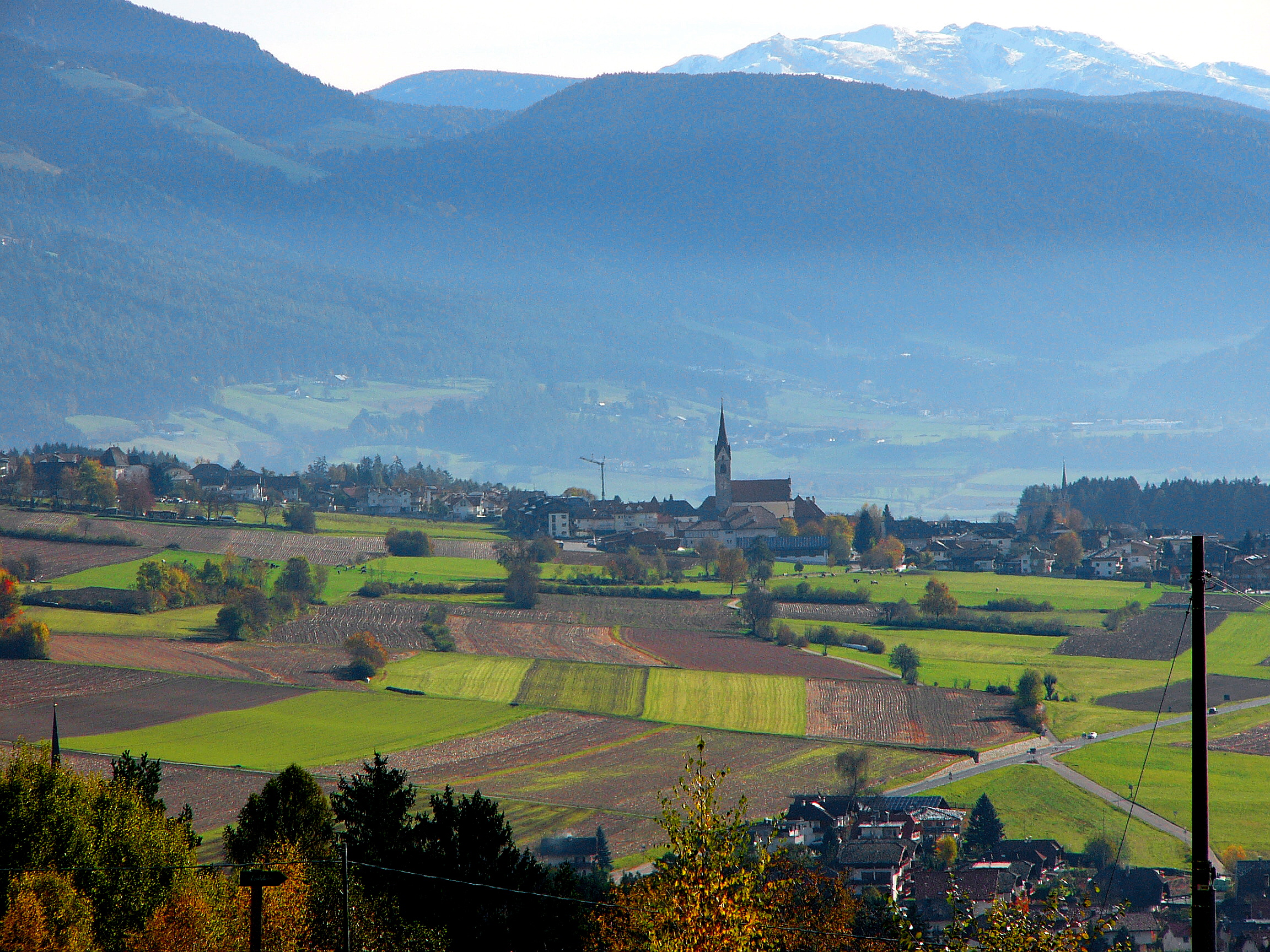
- View of Pfalzen

- Coat of arms

- Location within Italy Location within Trentino-Alto Adige/Südtirol
- Coordinates: 46°49′N 11°53′E
- Country: Italy
- Region: Trentino-Alto Adige/Südtirol
- Province: South Tyrol (BZ)
- Frazioni: Greinwalden (Grimaldo), Issing (Issengo)

Government
  - Mayor: Roland Tinkhauser (SVP)

Area
  - Total: 33.3 km^{2} (12.9 sq mi)
- Elevation: 1,022 m (3,353 ft)

Population (Dec. 2015)
  - Total: 2,753
  - Density: 82.7/km^{2} (214/sq mi)
- Demonym(s): German: Pfalzner; Italian: di Falzes
- Time zone: UTC+1 (CET)
  - Summer (DST): UTC+2 (CEST)
- Postal code: 39030
- Dialing code: 0474
- Website: Official website

Pfalzen (German pronunciation: [ˈpfaltsn̩]; Italian: Falzes [ˈfaltses]) is a comune (municipality) and a village in South Tyrol in northern Italy, located about 70 kilometres (43 mi) northeast of Bolzano.

== Geography ==
As of July 2023, it had a population of 3,106 and an area of 33.3 square kilometres (12.9 mi^{2}).

Pfalzen borders the following municipalities: Bruneck, Kiens, Gais, St. Lorenzen and Mühlwald.

=== Frazioni ===
The municipality of Pfalzen contains the frazioni (subdivisions, mainly villages and hamlets) Greinwalden (Grimaldo) and Issing (Issengo).

== History ==
=== Coat-of-arms ===
The escutcheon is party per pale of gules and argent; with a sickle in each side of opposite color. It is the coat of arms of the Plazoll zu Assling, Lords of Pfalzen in the Middle Ages, who built the castle of Sichelburg (sichel in German means sickle). The emblem was adopted in 1967.

== Society ==
=== Linguistic distribution ===
According to the 2024 census, 94.15% of the population speak German, 4.58% Italian and 1.26% Ladin as first language.

=== Demographic evolution ===
Historical population

Year	Pop.	±%
1861	?	—
1871	?	—
1881	?	—
1901	?	—
1911	?	—
1921	1,022	—

Year	Pop.	±%
1931	985	−3.6%
1936	1,126	+14.3%
1951	1,120	−0.5%
1961	1,221	+9.0%
1971	1,455	+19.2%
1981	1,756	+20.7%

Year	Pop.	±%
1991	2,049	+16.7%
2001	2,255	+10.1%
2011	2,620	+16.2%
2021	2,977	+13.6%

Source: Data from ISTAT

== Notable people ==
- Fabian Aichner - professional wrestler
- Luis Durnwalder - former Governor of South Tyrol (1989–2014)
