= Mareo =

- Comune
- Comun de Mareo; Comune di Marebbe; Gemeinde Enneberg
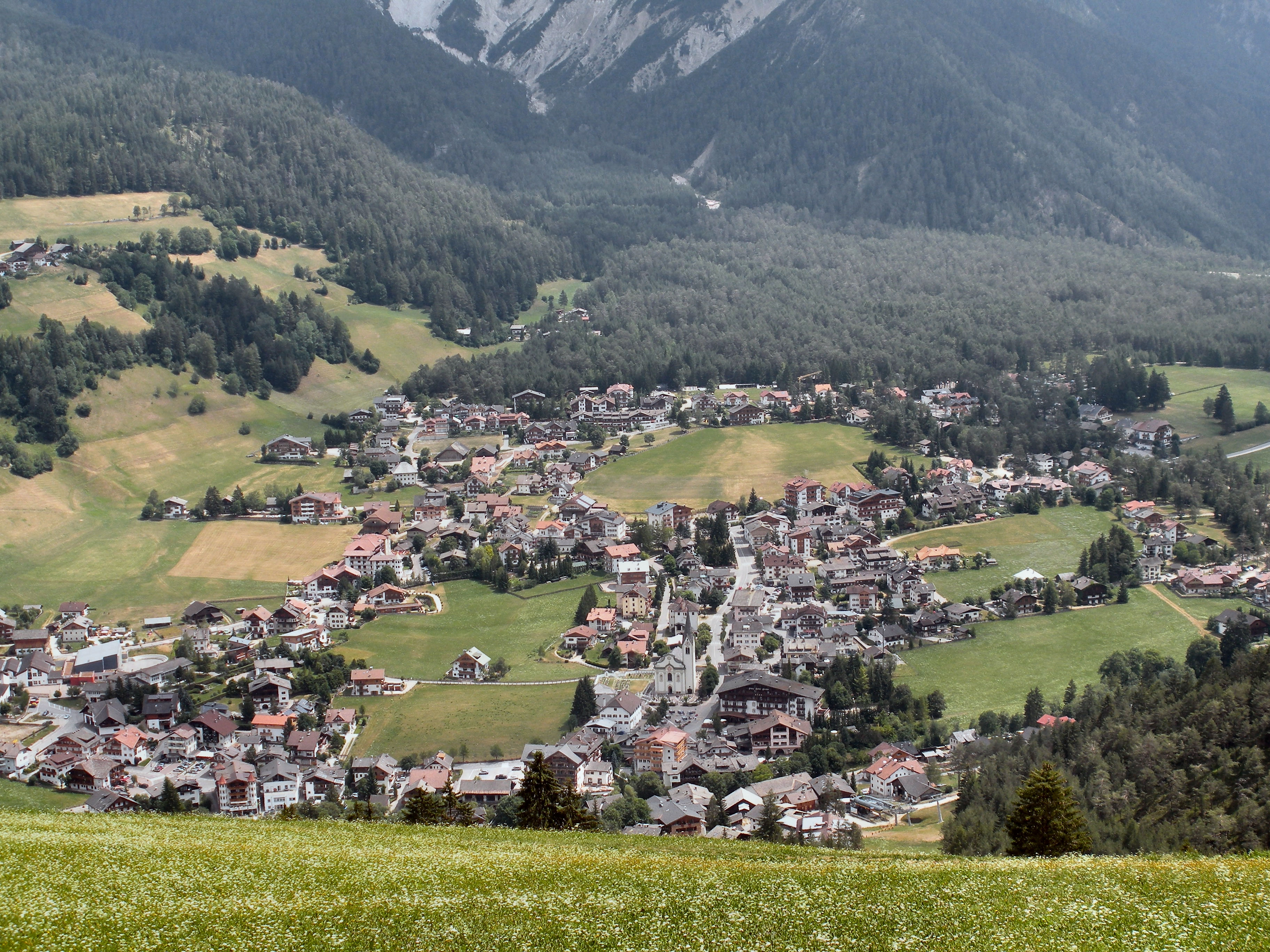

- Location within Italy Location within Trentino-Alto Adige/Südtirol
- Coordinates: 46°42′N 11°56′E
- Country: Italy
- Region: Trentino-Alto Adige/Südtirol
- Province: South Tyrol (BZ)
- Frazioni: Curt (Corte/Hof), Mantena, La Pli de Mareo, Pliscia (Plisa/Plaiken), Al Plan (San Vigilio/St. Vigil), Rina (Welschellen), Longega (Zwischenwasser)

Government
  - Mayor: Alberto Palfrader

Area
  - Total: 161.6 km^{2} (62.4 sq mi)

Population (Nov. 2010)
  - Total: 2,911
  - Density: 18.01/km^{2} (46.66/sq mi)
- Demonym(s): Ladin: maroi Italian: marebbani German: Enneberger
- Time zone: UTC+1 (CET)
  - Summer (DST): UTC+2 (CEST)
- Postal code: 39030
- Dialing code: 0474
- Website: Official website

Mareo (Italian: Marebbe [maˈrɛbbe]; German: Enneberg [ˈɛnebɛrɡ]) is a comune (municipality) in South Tyrol in northern Italy, located about 50 kilometres (31 mi) northeast of Bolzano.

== Geography ==
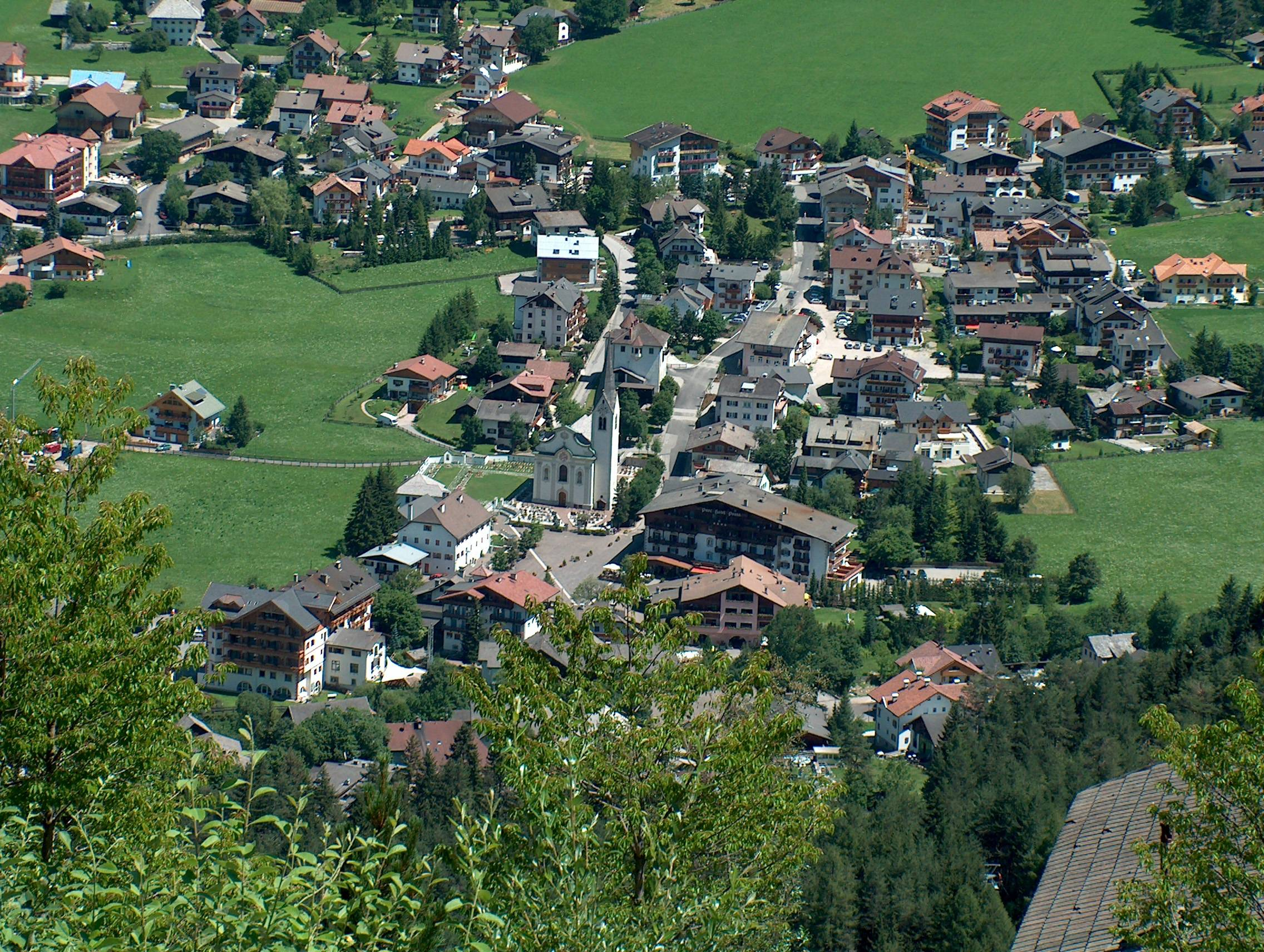
the town

As of 30 November 2010, it had a population of 2,911 and an area of 161.6 square kilometres (62.4 mi^{2}).

Mareo borders the following municipalities: Badia, Prags, Bruneck, Cortina d'Ampezzo, La Val, Lüsen, St. Lorenzen, San Martin de Tor and Olang.

=== Frazioni ===
The municipality of Mareo contains the frazioni (subdivisions, mainly villages and hamlets) Curt (Corte/Hof), Mantena, La Pli de Mareo, Pliscia (Plisa/Plaiken), Al Plan (San Vigilio/St. Vigil), Rina (Welschellen), and Longega (Zwischenwasser).

== History ==
=== Coat of arms ===
The shield is parted quarterly: the first part represents the Tyrolean Eagle on argent; the second the insignia of Austria. The third shows the head's dog of argent, with an or collar on gules, which represents the arms of the Lords of Ros that in thirteenth century had a castle in the village. The fourth arms is a sable hound with a gules bone in the jaws on argent; it’s the coat of Pracken family, one of the oldest families in Tyrol, which had properties in the area. The emblem was adopted in 1969.

== Society ==
=== Linguistic distribution ===
According to the 2024 census, 92.23% of the population speak Ladin, 4.32% Italian and 3.45% German as first language.

=== Demographic evolution ===
Historical population

Year	Pop.	±%
1861	?	—
1871	?	—
1881	?	—
1901	?	—
1911	?	—

Year	Pop.	±%
1921	1,885	—
1931	2,021	+7.2%
1936	2,078	+2.8%
1951	2,147	+3.3%
1961	2,269	+5.7%

Year	Pop.	±%
1971	2,377	+4.8%
1981	2,413	+1.5%
1991	2,574	+6.7%
2001	2,682	+4.2%

Source: Data from ISTAT
