= Vintl =

- Comune
- Gemeinde Vintl; Comune di Vandoies
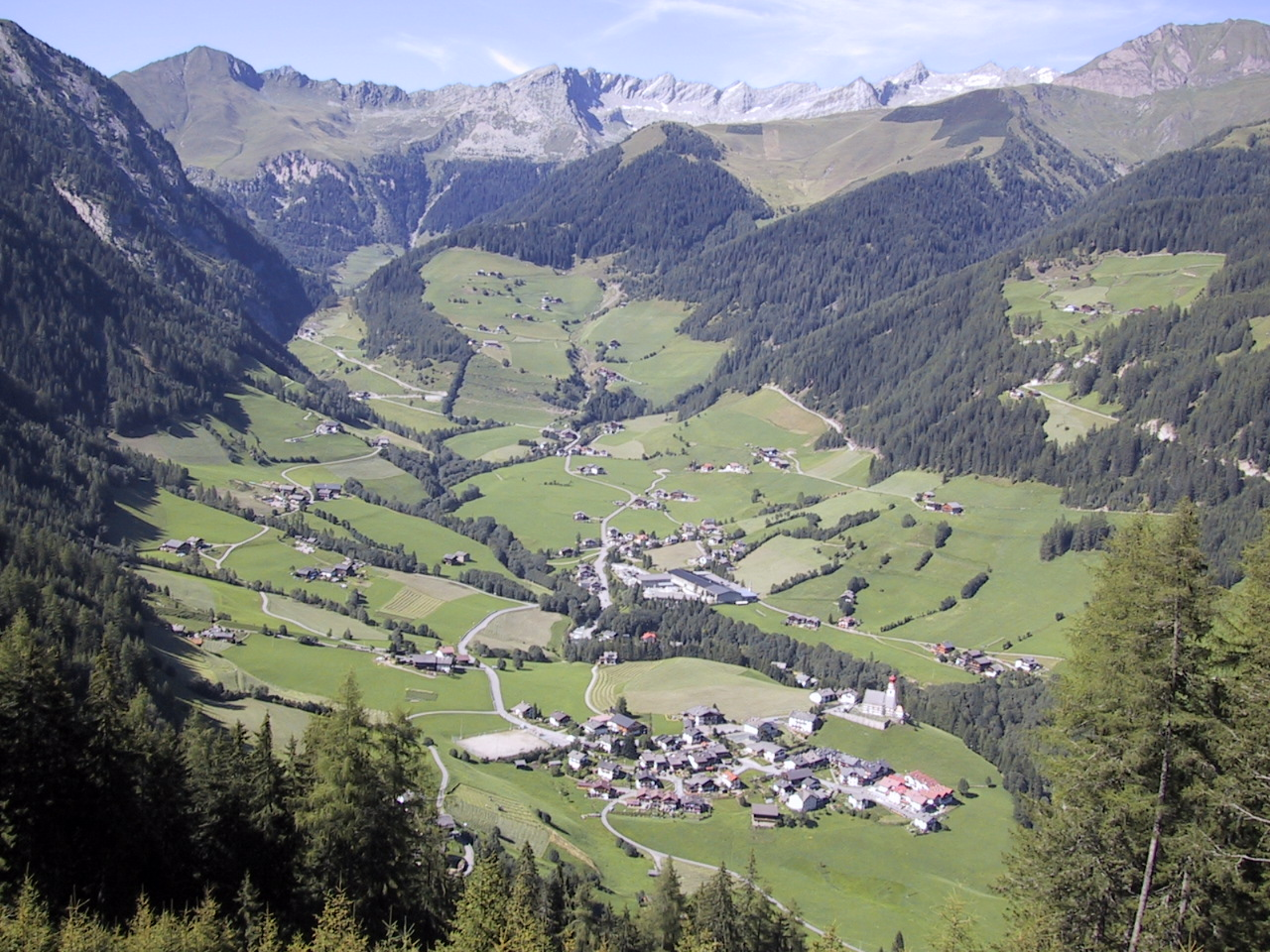
- Pfunders and other parts of the town

- Location within Italy Location within Trentino-Alto Adige/Südtirol
- Coordinates: 46°49′N 11°44′E
- Country: Italy
- Region: Trentino-Alto Adige/Südtirol
- Province: South Tyrol (BZ)
- Frazioni: Niedervintl (Vandoies di Sotto), Obervintl (Vandoies di Sopra), Weitental (Vallarga), Pfunders (Fundres)

Government
  - Mayor: Robert Seebacher

Area
  - Total: 110.6 km^{2} (42.7 sq mi)

Population (Nov. 2010)
  - Total: 3,264
  - Density: 29.51/km^{2} (76.44/sq mi)
- Demonym(s): German: Vintler or Vintila; Italian: di Vandoies
- Time zone: UTC+1 (CET)
  - Summer (DST): UTC+2 (CEST)
- Postal code: 39030
- Dialing code: 0472
- Website: Official website

Vintl (German: [ˈfɪntl̩]; Italian: Vandoies [vanˈdɔːjes]; Ladin: Vandoies) is a comune (municipality) in South Tyrol in northern Italy, located about 45 kilometres (28 mi) northeast of Bolzano.

== Geography ==
As of November 30, 2010, it had a population of 3,264 and an area of 110.6 square kilometres (42.7 mi^{2}).

The municipality of Vintl contains the frazioni (subdivisions, mainly villages and hamlets) Niedervintl (Vandoies di Sotto), Obervintl (Vandoies di Sopra), Weitental (Vallarga) and Pfunders (Fundres).

Vintl borders the following municipalities: Kiens, Mühlbach, Rodeneck, Mühlwald, Terenten, and Pfitsch.

=== Pfunderer Mountains ===
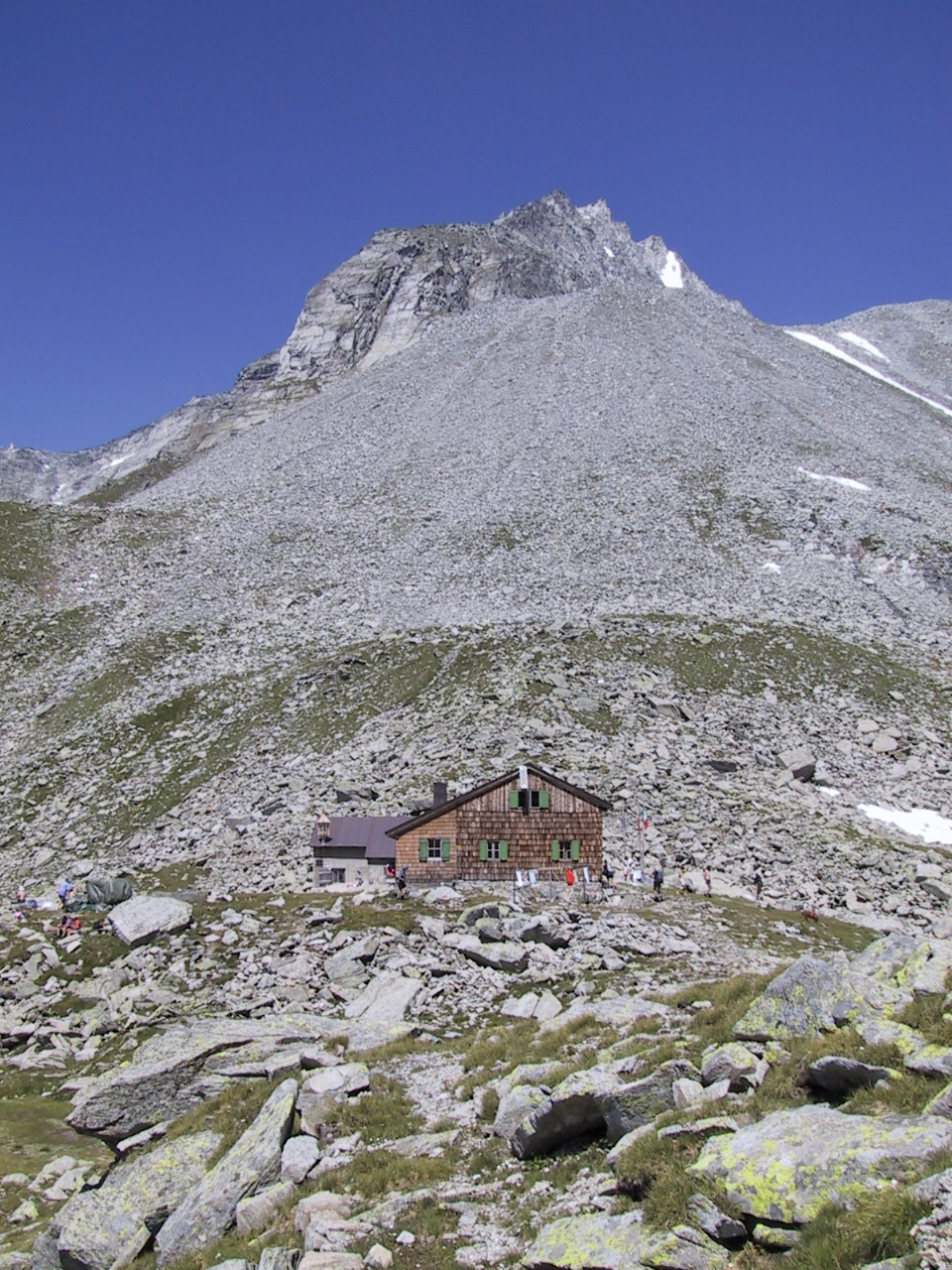
The Edelraut Hut and the Niederer Weißzint on the Pfunderer Ridgeway

The ridges south-west of the main chain of the Zillertal are called the Pfunderer Mountains and occupy an area of about 300 km². The Pfunderer valley is embedded in them. They also enclose the Valler Valley in the west, form the mountain chain with the Pfitscher Valley and extend eastwards into the municipalities of Mühlwald and Terenten. The most prominent peaks in the municipality of Vintl include the Niederer Weißzint (3,263 m) and the Grabspitze (3,068 m s.l.m.) near the Pfunderer Joch, the highest peak on the ridge between the Pfitscher valley and Weitenberger Kar, the Wurmaulspitze (3,022 m s.l.m.), the highest summit west of the Weitenberger Alm, the Napfspitze (2,888 m s.l.m.) south of the Eisbruggjoch col, the Hochgrubbachspitze (2,819 m), the highest point in the eastern Pfunderer and, in front of it, the Eidechsspitze (2,738 m s.l.m.), the Hausberg of Vintl. A well-known hiking trail is the Pfunderer Ridgeway starting from Sterzing and leading up through the Pfunderer mountains to the area of Bruneck.

== Society ==
=== Linguistic distribution ===
According to the 2024 census, 97.09% of the population speak German, 2.29% Italian and 0.62% Ladin as first language.

== Demographic evolution ==
Historical population

Year	Pop.	±%
1861	?	—
1871	?	—
1881	?	—
1901	?	—
1911	?	—

Year	Pop.	±%
1921	1,999	—
1931	2,080	+4.1%
1936	2,303	+10.7%
1951	2,355	+2.3%
1961	2,562	+8.8%

Year	Pop.	±%
1971	2,741	+7.0%
1981	2,849	+3.9%
1991	2,961	+3.9%
2001	3,108	+5.0%

Source: Data from ISTAT

== Twin towns ==
Vintl is twinned with:

- Siegsdorf, Germany, since 1970
