= St. Lorenzen =

- Comune
- Marktgemeinde St. Lorenzen; Comune di San Lorenzo di Sebato
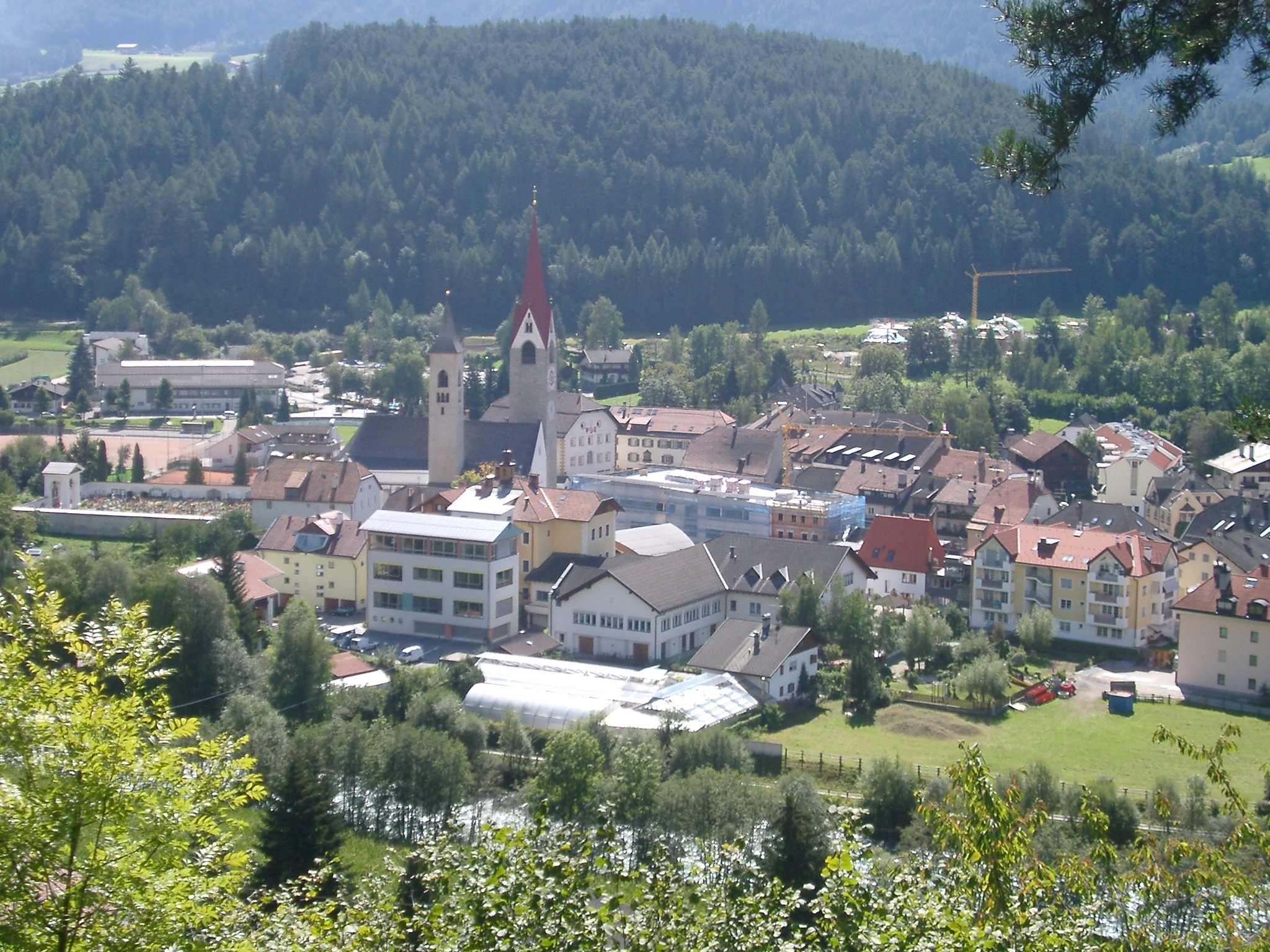
- View of St. Lorenzen

- Coat of arms

- Location within Italy Location within Trentino-Alto Adige/Südtirol
- Coordinates: 46°47′N 11°54′E
- Country: Italy
- Region: Trentino-Alto Adige/Südtirol
- Province: South Tyrol (BZ)
- Frazioni: Ellen (Elle), Fassing (Fassine), Runggen (Ronchi), Montal (Mantana), Pflaurenz (Floronzo), Saalen (Sares), Sonnenburg (Castelbadia), Stefansdorf (Sante Stefano), St Martin (San Martino), Moos (Palù), Lothen, Onach

Government
  - Mayor: Martin Ausserdorfer

Area
  - Total: 51.5 km^{2} (19.9 sq mi)
- Elevation: 810 m (2,660 ft)

Population (November 2010)
  - Total: 3,752
  - Density: 72.9/km^{2} (189/sq mi)
- Demonym(s): German: Lorenzner; Italian: Lorenzesi
- Time zone: UTC+1 (CET)
  - Summer (DST): UTC+2 (CEST)
- Postal code: 39030
- Dialing code: 0474
- Website: Official website

St. Lorenzen (German pronunciation: [saŋkt loˈrɛntsn̩]; Italian: San Lorenzo di Sebato [san loˈrɛntso di seˈbaːto]) is a comune (municipality) in South Tyrol in northern Italy, located about 50 kilometers (31 mi) northeast of Bolzano. As of 30 November 2010, it had a population of 3,752 and an area of 51.5 km^{2} (19.9 mi^{2}).

St Lorenzen borders the following municipalities: Bruneck, Kiens, Pfalzen, Lüsen, Mareo, and Rodeneck.

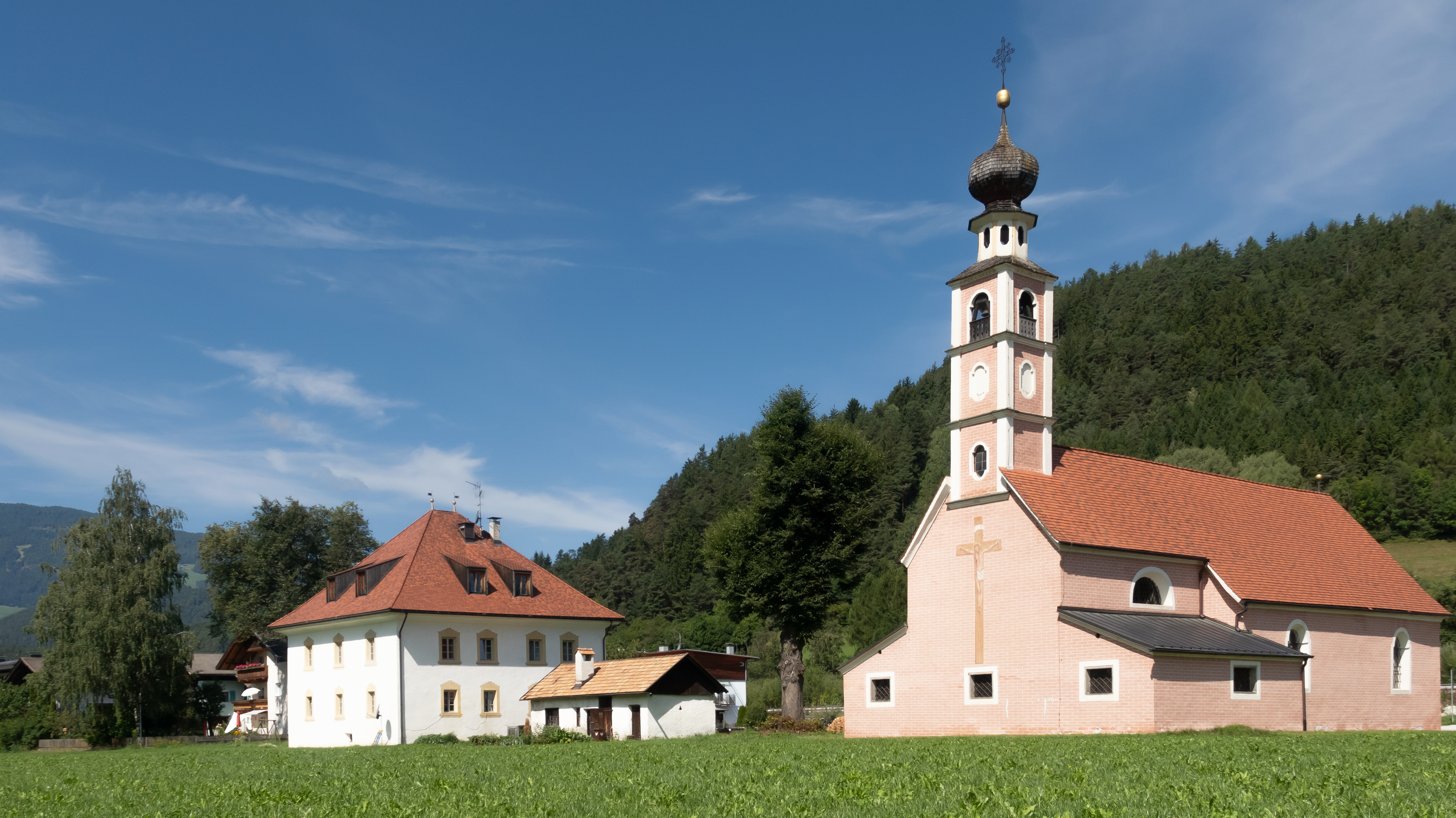
St. Lorenzen: The church Heiligkreuz in Fronwies

== Geography ==
As of 30 November 2010, it had a population of 3,752 and an area of 51.5 km^{2} (19.9 mi^{2}).

The municipality of St Lorenzen contains the frazioni (subdivisions, mainly villages and hamlets) Ellen (Elle), Fassing (Fassine), Runggen (Ronchi), Montal (Mantana), Pflaurenz (Floronzo), Saalen (Sares), Sonnenburg (Castelbadia), Stefansdorf (Sante Stefano), St Martin (San Martino), Moos (Palù), Lothen, and Onach.

St Lorenzen borders the following municipalities: Bruneck, Kiens, Pfalzen, Lüsen, Mareo, and Rodeneck.

== History ==
=== Coat of arms ===
The emblem represents Saint Laurence, with a vert palm in his right hand and a grill on the left, on argent. The emblem is used by the 17th century, but appears in the seal since 1271.

== Society ==
=== Linguistic distribution ===
According to the 2024 census, 93.84% of the population speak German, 3.95% Italian and 2.22% Ladin as first language.

=== Demographic evolution ===
Historical population

| Year | Pop. | ±% |
|---|---|---|
| 1861 | ? | — |
| 1871 | ? | — |
| 1881 | ? | — |
| 1901 | ? | — |
| 1911 | ? | — |

| Year | Pop. | ±% |
|---|---|---|
| 1921 | 2,298 | — |
| 1931 | 2,318 | +0.9% |
| 1936 | 2,511 | +8.3% |
| 1951 | 2,396 | −4.6% |
| 1961 | 2,415 | +0.8% |

| Year | Pop. | ±% |
|---|---|---|
| 1971 | 2,645 | +9.5% |
| 1981 | 2,950 | +11.5% |
| 1991 | 3,085 | +4.6% |
| 2001 | 3,438 | +11.4% |

Source: Data from ISTAT

== Notable people ==
- Jakob Hutter
