= Welsberg-Taisten =

- Comune
- Marktgemeinde Welsberg-Taisten; Comune di Monguelfo-Tesido
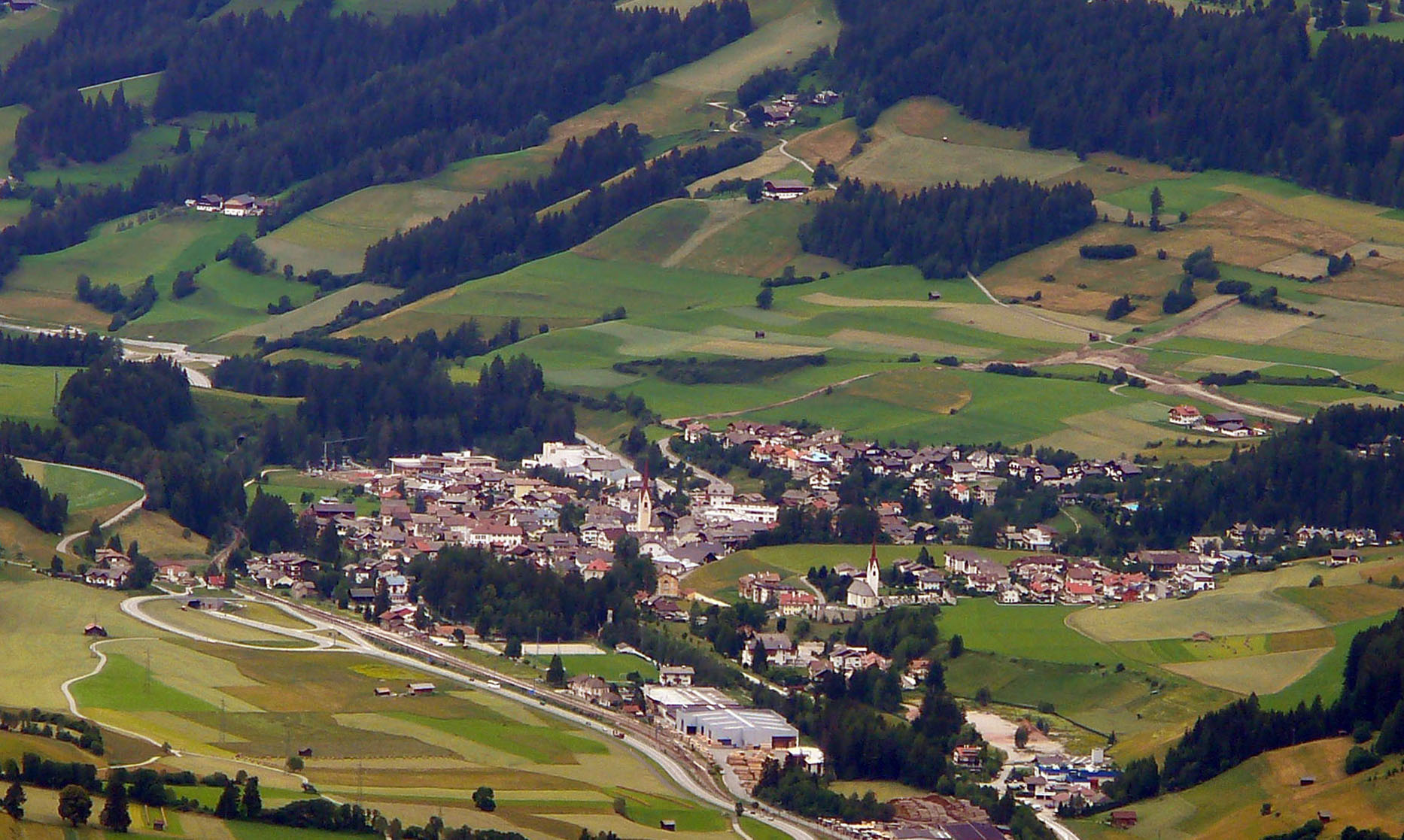
- Welsberg-Taisten

- Coat of arms

- Location within Italy Location within Trentino-Alto Adige/Südtirol
- Coordinates: 46°45′N 12°7′E
- Country: Italy
- Region: Trentino-Alto Adige/Südtirol
- Province: South Tyrol (BZ)
- Frazioni: Ried (Novale), Wiesen (Prati), Unterrain (Riva di Sotto), Taisten (Tesido)

Government
  - Mayor: Dominik Oberstaller

Area
  - Total: 46 km^{2} (18 sq mi)
- Elevation: 1,087 m (3,566 ft)
- Highest elevation: 2,687 m (8,816 ft)
- Lowest elevation: 1,042 m (3,419 ft)

Population (Nov. 2010)
  - Total: 2,809
  - Density: 61/km^{2} (160/sq mi)
- Demonym(s): German: Welsberger; Italian: di Monguelfo
- Time zone: UTC+1 (CET)
  - Summer (DST): UTC+2 (CEST)
- Postal code: 39035
- Dialing code: 0474
- Website: Official website

Welsberg-Taisten (Austrian German: [ˈvɛlsbɛrɡ ˈtaɪstn̩]; Italian: Monguelfo-Tesido [moŋˈɡwɛlfo ˈteːzido]) is a comune (municipality) in the province of South Tyrol in northern Italy, located about 60 kilometres (37 mi) northeast of the city of Bolzano.

== Geography ==
As of November 30, 2010, it had a population of 2,809 and an area of 46.6 square kilometres (18.0 mi^{2}). Welsberg-Taisten borders the following municipalities: Prags, Rasen-Antholz, Olang, Gsies, and Niederdorf.

=== Frazioni ===
The municipality of Welsberg-Taisten contains the frazioni (parishes) Welsberg (Monguelfo), Ried (Novale), Wiesen (Prati), Unterrain (Riva di Sotto) and Taisten (Tesido). Taisten lies 1,212 metres (3,976 ft) above sea level in the Puster Valley, east of Bruneck.

== History ==
=== Coat-of-arms ===
The emblem is quarterly argent and sable. It is the arms of the Earls of Welsberg, whose castle was in the municipality, which gave to the village its name. The emblem was adopted in 1932.

== Society ==
=== Linguistic distribution ===
According to the 2024 census, 91.33% of the population speak German, 8.41% Italian and 0.27% Ladin as first language.

=== Demographic evolution ===
Historical population

Year	Pop.	±%
1861	?	—
1871	?	—
1881	?	—
1901	?	—
1911	?	—

Year	Pop.	±%
1921	1,677	—
1931	1,858	+10.8%
1936	1,912	+2.9%
1951	1,954	+2.2%
1961	2,179	+11.5%

Year	Pop.	±%
1971	2,295	+5.3%
1981	2,242	−2.3%
1991	2,402	+7.1%
2001	2,528	+5.2%

Source: Data from ISTAT
