= FIL European Luge Natural Track Championships =

Sporting competition

The FIL European Luge Natural Track Championships, part of the International Luge Federation (FIL), have taken place since 1970. A team event was added for the 2010 championships. For information on luge championships in Europe that have been contested since 1914, please see FIL European Luge Championships.

== Host cities ==
- 1970: Kapfenberg, Austria
- 1971: Vandans, Austria
- 1973: Taisten, Italy
- 1974: Niedernsill, Austria
- 1975: Feld am See, Austria
- 1977: Seis am Schlern, Italy
- 1978: Aurach, Austria
- 1979: Aosta, Italy
- 1981: Niedernsill, Austria
- 1983: St. Konrad, Austria
- 1985: Szczyrk, Poland
- 1987: Jesenice, Yugoslavia
- 1989: Garmisch-Partenkirchen, West Germany
- 1991: Völs am Schlern, Italy
- 1993: Stein an der Enns, Austria
- 1995: Kandalaksha, Russia
- 1997: Passiria, Italy
- 1999: Szczyrk, Poland
- 2002: Frantschach, Austria
- 2004: Hüttau, Austria
- 2006: Umhausen, Austria
- 2008: Olang, Italy
- 2010: Sankt Sebastian, Austria
- 2012: Nouvoralsk, Russia
- 2014: Umhausen, Austria
- 2016: Passeiertal, Italy
- 2018: Winterleiten, Austria
- 2020: Moscow, Russia

== Men's singles ==
Debuted: 1970

Games	Gold	Silver	Bronze
1970 Kapfenberg	Ernst Stangl (AUT)	Anton Obernosterer (AUT)	Gottfried Lexer (AUT)
1971 Vandans	Anton Obernosterer (AUT)	Gottfried Lexer (AUT)	Erwin Eichelberger (AUT)
1973 Taisten	Ernst Stangl (AUT)	Josef Trojer (ITA)	Engelbert Fuchs (AUT)
1974 Niedernsill	Erich Graber (ITA)	Erwin Eichelberger (AUT)	Albert Eichelberger (AUT)
1975 Feld am See	Alfred Kogler (AUT)	Erich Graber (ITA)	Helmut Huter (AUT)
1977 Seis am Schlern	Erich Graber (ITA)	Werner Belkircher (ITA)	Damiano Lugon (ITA)
1978 Aurach	Hubert Mairamhof (ITA)	Werner Prantl (AUT)	Alfred Kogler (AUT)
1979 Aosta	Damiano Lugon (ITA)	Otto Bachman (ITA)	Andrea Millet (ITA)
1981 Niedernsill	Otto Bachman (ITA)	Damiano Lugon (ITA)	Othmar Neulichedl (ITA)
1983 St. Konrad	Otto Bachman (ITA)	Martin Jud (ITA)	Andreas Jud (ITA)
1985 Szczyrk	Manfred Danklmaier (AUT)	Damiano Lugon (ITA)	Robert Tomelitsch (AUT)
1987 Jesenice	Manfred Graber (ITA)	Harald Steinhauser (ITA)	Erhard Mahlknecht (ITA)
1989 Garmisch-Partenkirchen	Damiano Lugon (ITA)	Gerhard Pilz (AUT)	Manfred Graber (ITA)
1991 Völs am Schlern	Franz Obrist (ITA)	Erhard Mahlknecht (ITA)	Harald Steinhauser (ITA)
1993 Stein an der Enns	Anton Blasbichler (ITA)	Willi Danklmaier (AUT)	Franz Obrist (ITA)
1995 Kandalaksha	Manfred Graber (ITA)	Martin Gruber (ITA)	Robert Tomelitsch (AUT)
1997 Passiria	Reinhard Gruber (ITA)	Manfred Graber (ITA)	Gerhard Pilz (AUT)
1999 Szczyrk	Anton Blasbichler (ITA)	Robert Batkowski (AUT)	Gerald Kallan (AUT)
2002 Frantschach	Gerhard Pilz (AUT)	Robert Batkowski (AUT)	Gernot Schwab (AUT)
2004 Hüttau	Gerhard Pilz (AUT)	Andreas Castiglioni (ITA)	Gerald Kallan (AUT)
2006 Umhausen	Gernot Schwab (AUT)	Thomas Schopf (AUT)	Patrick Pigneter (ITA)
2008 Olang	Robert Batkowski (AUT)	Anton Blasbichler (ITA)	Patrick Pigneter (ITA)
2010 St. Sebastian	Patrick Pigneter (ITA)	Thomas Kammerlander (AUT)	Anton Blasbichler (ITA)

== Women's singles ==
Debuted: 1970

Games	Gold	Silver	Bronze
1970 Kapfenberg	Hannelore Plattner (AUT)	Klara Niedertscheider (AUT)	Maria Dibiasi (ITA)
1971 Vandans	Klara Niedertscheider (AUT)	Annemarie Ebner (AUT)	Ruth Oberhöller (AUT)
1973 Taisten	Elfriede Pirkmann (AUT)	Berta Pichler (AUT)	Martha Ruech (AUT)
1974 Niedernsill	Klara Niedertscheider (AUT)	Elfriede Pirkmann (AUT)	Annemarie Ebner (AUT)
1975 Feld am See	Klara Niedertscheider (AUT)	Annemarie Ebner (AUT)	Elfriede Pirkmann (AUT)
1977 Seis am Schlern	Helene Mitterstieler (ITA)	Elfriede Pirkmann (AUT)	Rosa Schwingshackl (ITA)
1978 Aurach	Elfriede Pirkmann (AUT)	Roswitha Fischer (ITA)	Ruth Oberhöller (AUT)
1979 Aosta	Roswitha Fischer (ITA)	Christa Fontana (ITA)	Herta Hafner (ITA)
1981 Niedernsill	Delia Vaudan (ITA)	Helene Mitterstieler (ITA)	Elfriede Pirkmann (AUT)
1983 St. Konrad	Ingerborg Innerhofer (AUT)	Irmgard Lanthaler (ITA)	Delia Vaudan (ITA)
1985 Szczyrk	Delia Vaudan (ITA)	Irmgard Lanthaler (ITA)	Herta Hafner (ITA)
1987 Jesenice	Delia Vaudan (ITA)	Helga Pichler (ITA)	Irene Koch (AUT)
1989 Garmisch-Partenkirchen	Delia Vaudan (ITA)	Jeanette Koppensteiner (AUT)	Irene Koch (AUT)
1991 Völs am Schlern	Doris Haselrieder (ITA)	Irene Koch (AUT)	Delia Vaudan (ITA)
1993 Stein an der Enns	Irene Zechner (AUT)	Doris Haselrieder (ITA)	Elvira Holzknecht (AUT)
1995 Kandalaksha	Irene Zechner (AUT)	Lyubov Panyutina (RUS)	Elvira Holzknecht (AUT)
1997 Passiria	Lyubov Panyutina (RUS)	Elvira Holzknecht (AUT)	Sonja Steinacher (ITA)
1999 Szczyrk	Sonja Steinacher (ITA)	Elvira Holzknecht (AUT)	Christa Gietl (ITA)
2002 Frantschach	Sandra Lanthaler (ITA)	Yekaterina Lavrentyeva (RUS)	Sonja Steinacher (ITA)
2004 Hüttau	Yekaterina Lavrentyeva (RUS)	Christa Gietl (ITA)	Barbara Abart (ITA)
2006 Umhausen	Christa Gietl (ITA)	Imelda Gruber (ITA)	Renate Gietl (ITA)
2008 Olang	Yekaterina Lavrentyeva (RUS)	Renate Kasslatter (ITA)	Renate Gietl (ITA)
2010 St. Sebastian	Yekaterina Lavrentyeva (RUS)	Evelin Lanthaler (ITA)	Renate Gietl (ITA)

== Men's doubles ==
Debuted: 1970

Games	Gold	Silver	Bronze
1970 Kapfenberg	Anton Obernosterer; Josef Lexer; Austria	H. Graber; Erich Graber; Italy	Josef Hilgartner; Gerhard Sandhofer; Austria
1971 Vandans	S. Graber; J. Niedermaier; Italy	Anton Obernosterer; Gabriel Obernosterer; Austria	Siegfried Wild; Othmar Hofer; Austria
1973 Taisten	P. Mitterstieler; P. Votter; Italy	Anton Obernosterer; Gabriel Obernosterer; Austria	F. Wurzer; B. Wurzer; Italy
1974 Niedernsill	Siegfried Wild; Othmar Hofer; Austria	R. Jud; Erich Graber; Italy	Helmut Kleinhofer; Karl Flacher; Austria
1975 Feld am See	R. Jud; Erich Graber; Italy	Engelbert Fuchs; Gottfried Kreuzer; Austria	Ernst Stangl; Erwin Eichelberger; Austria
1977 Seis am Schlern	R. Jud; Erich Graber; Italy	Johann Mair; Michael Plaikner; Italy	Hubert Mairamhof; J. Pioner; Italy
1978 Aurach	Werner Mücke; Helmut Huter; Austria	Hubert Mairamhof; J. Pioner; Italy	Gebhard Oberbichler; Hubert Ausserdorfer; Austria
1979 Aosta	Werner Prantl; Florian Prantl; Austria	Damiano Lugon; Andrea Millet; Italy	Oswald Pornbacher; Erich Graber; Italy
1981 Niedernsill	Oswald Pornbacher; Erich Graber; Italy	Hubert Mairamhof; H. Huber; Italy	Manfred Danklmaier; Willi Danklmaier; Austria
1983 St. Konrad	Andreas Jud; Gunther Steinhauser; Italy	Raimund Pigneter; Georg Antholzer; Italy	Roland Trattnig; Harald Rabitsch; Austria
1985 Szczyrk	Raimund Pigneter; Georg Antholzer; Italy	Almir Bentemps; Corrado Herin; Italy	Andreas Jud; Ernst Oberhammer; Italy
1987 Jesenice	Andreas Jud; Ernst Oberhammer; Italy	Almir Bentemps; Corrado Herin; Italy	Arnold Luger; Gunther Steinhauser; Italy
1989 Garmisch-Partenkirchen	Arnold Luger; Gunther Steinhauser; Italy	Manfred Graber; E. Marmsoler; Italy	Reinhold Bachmann; Manfred Als; Austria
1991 Völs am Schlern	Krzysztof Niewiadomski; Oktawian Samulski; Poland	Roland Niedermair; Hubert Burger; Italy	Georg Eberhardter; Walter Mauracher; Austria
1993 Stein an der Enns	Almir Bentemps; Corrado Herin; Italy	Jurgen Pezzi; Christian Hafner; Italy	Reinhold Bachmann; Manfred Als; Austria
1995 Kandalaksha	Andi Ruetz; Helmut Ruetz; Austria	Martin Psenner; Arthur Konig; Italy	Jurgen Pezzi; Christian Hafner; Italy
1997 Passiria	Andi Ruetz; Helmut Ruetz; Austria	Martin Psenner; Arthur Konig; Italy	Reinhard Beer; Herbert Kögl; Austria
1999 Szczyrk	Andi Ruetz; Helmut Ruetz; Austria	Peter Lechner; Peter Braunegger; Austria	Armin Mair; David Mair; Italy
2002 Frantschach	Wolfgang Schopf; Andreas Schopf; Austria	Reinhard Beer; Herbert Kögl; Austria	Andrzej Laszczak; Damian Waniczek; Poland
2004 Hüttau	Pavel Porzhnev; Ivan Lazarev; Russia	Denis Alimov; Roman Molvistov; Russia	Wolfgang Schopf; Andreas Schopf; Austria
2006 Umhausen	Pavel Porzhnev; Ivan Lazarev; Russia	Christian Schatz; Gerhard Mühlbacher; Austria	Denis Alimov; Roman Molvistov; Russia
2008 Olang	Pavel Porzhnev; Ivan Lazarev; Russia	Patrick Pigneter; Florian Clara; Italy	Aleksandr Yegorov; Pyotr Popov; Russia
2010 St. Sebastian	Patrick Pigneter; Florian Clara; Italy	Andrzej Laszczak; Damian Waniczek; Poland	Aleksandr Yegorov; Pyotr Popov; Russia

== Team event ==
Debuted: 2010.

Games	Gold	Silver	Bronze
2010 St. Sebastian	Melanie Batkowski; Thomas Kammerlander; Christian Schopf; Andreas Schopf; Austria	Renate Gietl; Alex Gruber; Patrick Pigneter; Florian Clara; Italy	Marlies Wagner; Gerald Kammerlander; Christian Schatz; Gerhard Mühlbacher; Austria

== Medal table ==
As of the 2010 FIL European Luge Natural Track Championships.

Rank	Nation	Gold	Silver	Bronze	Total
1	Italy	34	35	31	100
2	Austria	25	24	31	80
3	Russia	7	3	3	13
4	Poland	1	1	1	3
Totals (4 entries)		67	63	66	196
