= Ruetz =

Ruetz is a surname. Notable people with the name include:

- Andi Ruetz (born 1975), Austrian luger
- Babe Ruetz (1893–1997), American football coach
- Helmut Ruetz (born 1972), Austrian luger
- Howie Ruetz (1927–1999), American football player
- Joe Ruetz (1916–2003), American football player
- Michael Ruetz (1940–2024), German photographer and artist

== See also ==
- Ruetz (river), a river in Austria and Tyrol
