= FIL World Luge Natural Track Championships 2001 =

The FIL World Luge Natural Track Championships 2001 took place in Stein an der Enns, Austria. This marked the first time the championships were held in consecutive years since the first two championships were held in 1979 and 1980. The mixed team event was added to these championships.

== Men's singles ==
Medal	Athlete	Time
Gold	Anton Blasbichler (ITA)	
Silver	Ferdinand Hirzegger (AUT)	
Bronze	Gerhard Pilz (AUT)	

== Women's singles ==
Medal	Athlete	Time
Gold	Sonja Steinacher (ITA)	
Silver	Renate Gietl (ITA)	
Bronze	Sandra Mariner (AUT)	

== Men's doubles ==
Medal	Athlete	Time
Gold	Austria (Wolfgang Schopf, Andreas Schopf)	
Silver	Italy (Armin Mair, David Mair)	
Bronze	Austria (Peter Lechner, Peter Braunegger)	

== Mixed team ==
Medal	Athlete	Time
Gold	Italy (Sonja Steinacher, Anton Blasbichler, Armin Mair, David Mair)	
Silver	Austria (Marlies Wagner, Gerhard Pilz, Peter Lechner, Peter Braunegger)	
Bronze	Italy (Renate Gietl, Martin Gruber, Thomas Graf, Michael Graf)	

== Medal table ==
Rank	Nation	Gold	Silver	Bronze	Total
1	Italy (ITA)	3	2	1	6
2	Austria (AUT)	1	2	3	6
Totals (2 entries)		4	4	4	12
