= Prantl =

Prantl is a German surname. Notable people with the surname include:

- Florian Prantl, Austrian luger
- Heribert Prantl (born 1953), German journalist and jurist
- Karl Prantl (1923–2010), Austrian sculptor
- Karl Anton Eugen Prantl (1849–1893), German botanist
- Karl von Prantl (1820–1888), German philosopher
- Thomas Prantl (born 1974), German politician
- Werner Prantl, Austrian luger

== See also ==
- Gertrude Grob-Prandl
