= Lexer (surname) =

Lexer is a German surname. Notable people with the surname include:

- Erich Lexer, German physician
- Gottfried Lexer, Austrian luger
- Josef Lexer, Austrian luger
- Matthias Lexer, German lexicographer
- Ryan Lexer (born 1976), American-Israeli basketball player
