= Lugger (disambiguation) =

Lugger may refer to:

- Lugger, a type of small sailing vessel
- Alexander Lugger (b. 1968), Austrian ski mountaineer
- 7723 Lugger, a Mars-crossing asteroid
- Drascombe Lugger, a British boat design

== See also ==
- Luger (disambiguation)
- Lugar (disambiguation)
