= Lanthaler =

Lanthaler is a surname of South Tyrolean origin. Notable people with the surname include:

- Christian Lanthaler, Italian para-alpine skier
- Evelin Lanthaler (born 1991), Italian luger
- Irmgard Lanthaler, Italian luger
- Sandra Lanthaler (born 1984), Italian luger
