= Hilgartner =

Hilgartner is a surname. Notable people with the surname include:

- Jim Hilgartner, American author of poetry and fiction
- Josef Hilgartner, Austrian luger
