= Rätia cave =

Archaeological site in Austria

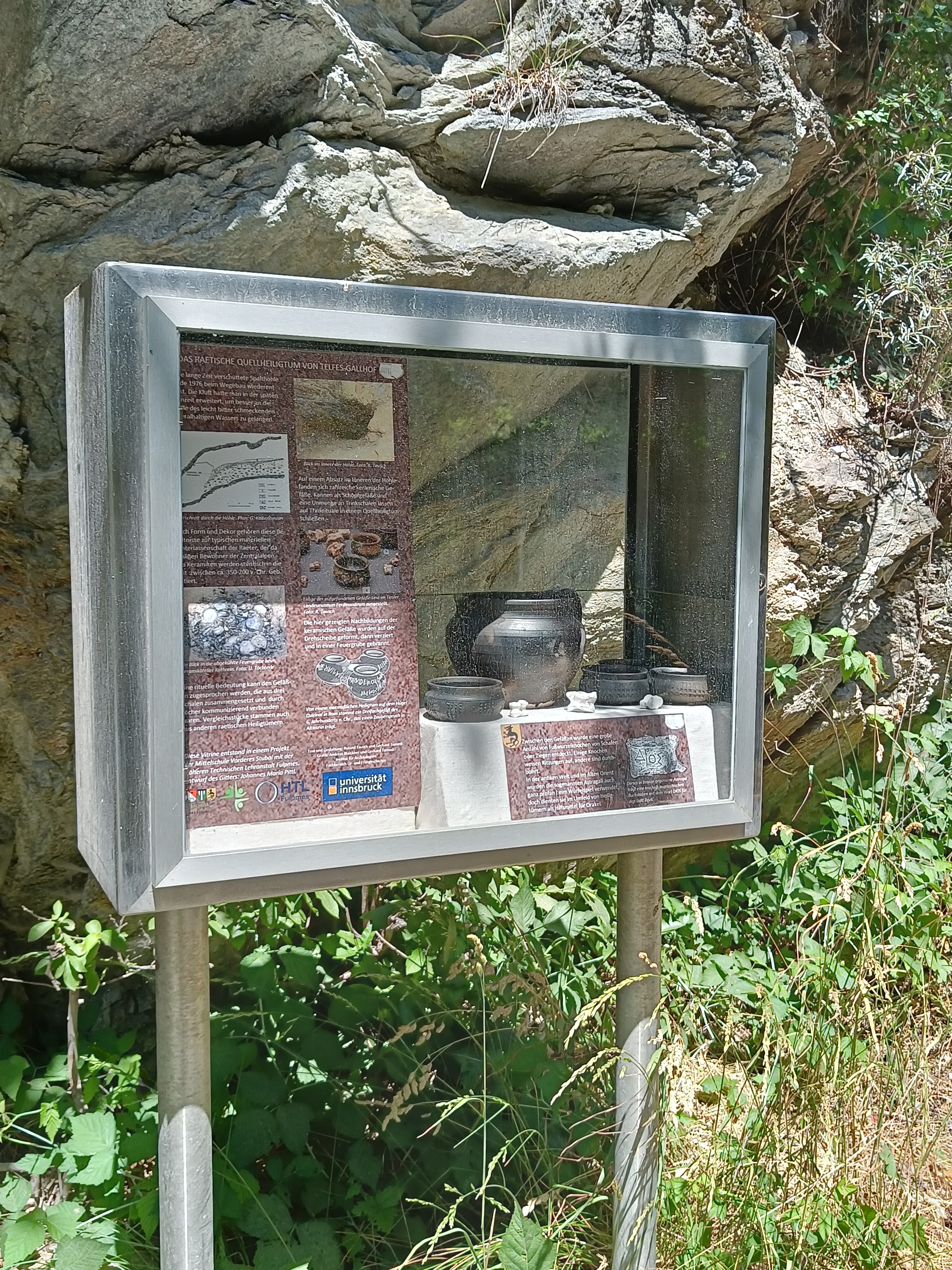
Information board in front of the Rätia cave.

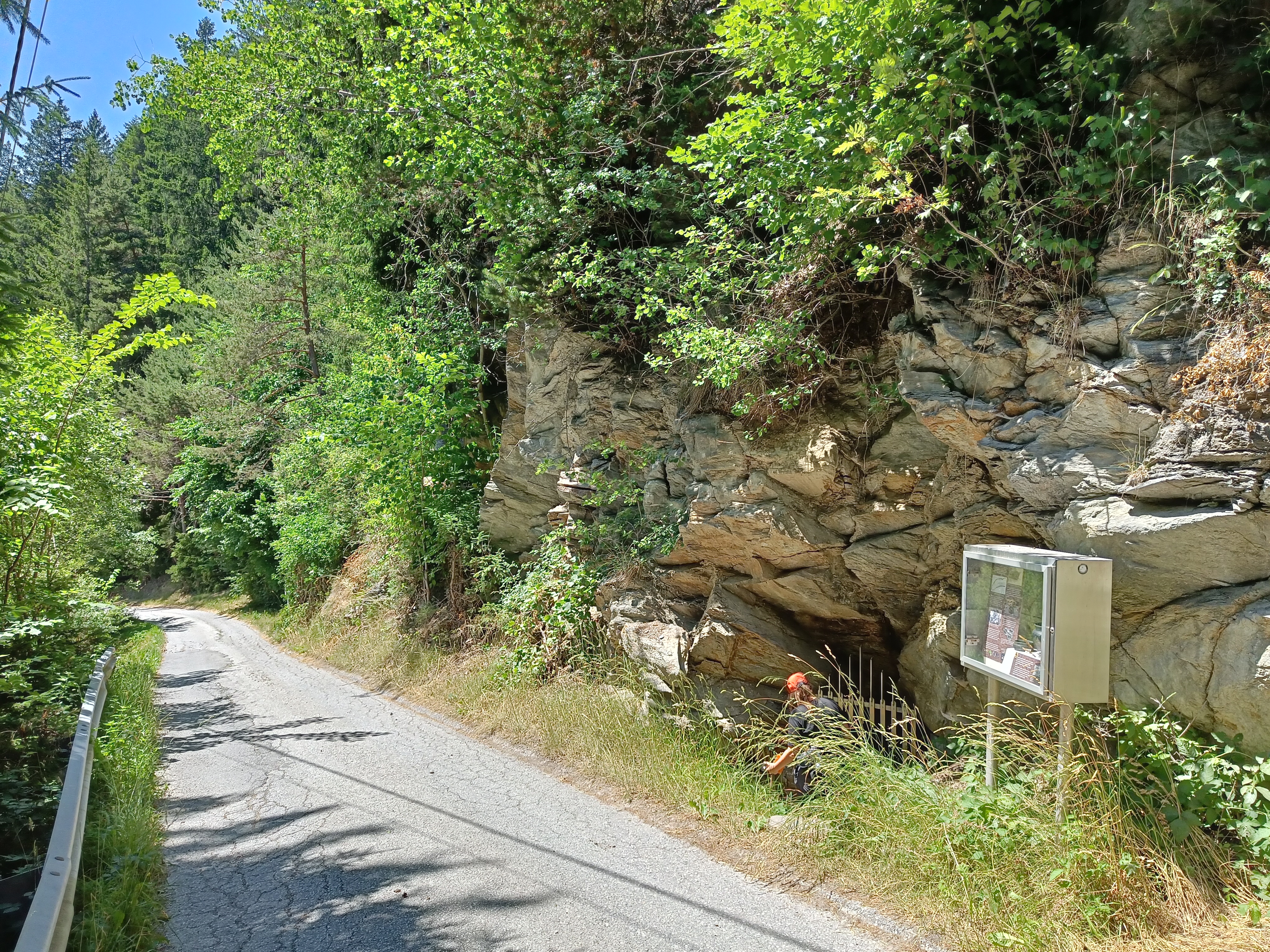
View of the Stubai valley with the cave's entrance.

The Rätia cave (Rätia-Höhle) is a cave northeast of Telfes in the lower Stubaital in Tirol, Austria. It was a holy well of the Rhaetian people from the Iron Age until the Roman conquest of the region.

== Description ==
The cave measures roughly 8 x 2 x 1.5 metres and was probably already used as a cistern in prehistoric times. It subsequently came to be known as the "Cistern of Telfes" (Zisterne von Telfes). Inside, condensation gathers from the stone. The mineral-rich, slightly sour water contains sulfate solutions and probably led to it becoming a holy well in the La Tène period.

== Finds ==
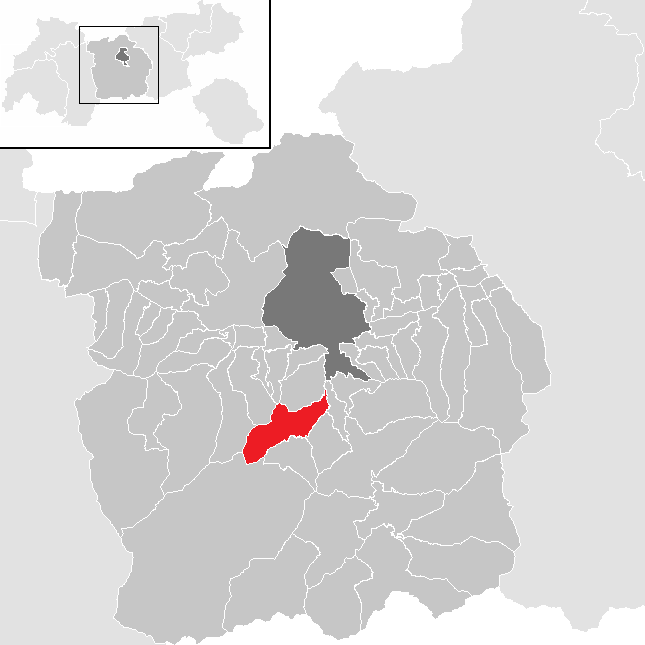
Site of the Gemeinde Telfes in Innsbruck-Land District, Tirol.

The cave was discovered in the area of Gallhof during the construction of a road in 1976. The Tyrolean State Museum launched a rescue excavation in March 1977, which found 43 worked astragaloi (knucklebones) from sheep or goats and over 200 well-preserved pots of the Fritzens-Sanzeno culture, an archaeological culture in the Alps in the Iron Age and La Tène period. The people of this culture, who have been identified as the Rhaetians known from textual sources, were totally wiped out or fully Romanised during the Roman conquest of Rhetia and the Alps (16-7 BC). The pottery and knucklebones are often marked by simple signs, similar to the letters of the so-called Rhaetian or north Etruscan alphabet.

The excavator Gerard Kaltenhauser suggested that the goddess Rehtia had been worshipped in this cave and that cups and votive gifts had been offered in the cave after drinking the healing waters. The term "Rhaetian" for the inhabitants of the later Roman province of Rhaetia should be derived from the name of this goddess Rehtia. Her main sanctuary was at Este, near the River Etsch.

The finds are displayed in the Tyrolean State Museum. Replicas of some vessels and astragaloi are displayed in a display case in front of the cave.

== Location ==
The Rätia cave ^{(47.17946°N 11.38280°E)} is located in the Ruetz valley, northeast of the Kirchbrücke between Wiesenhof ^{(47.1736387°N 11.3752117°E)} and Gallhof ^{(47.1818658°N 11.3875347°E)}. It is accessible from the road, whose construction led to the discovery of the cave in 1976.

== Bibliography ==
- Franz Fuhrmann, Laurin Luchner, Karl Oettinger et al. Reclams Kunstführer Band II, Salzburg, Tirol, Vorarlberg, Kärnten, Steiermark. Reclam, 1982, p. 473.
- Otto Helmut Urban: Wegweiser in die Urgeschichte Österreichs. Bundesverlag, Wien 1989, ISBN 3-215-06230-5, p. 219.
- Wilhelm Sydow, "Das latenezeitliche Quellheiligtum bei Telfes im Stubaital." In L. Zemmer-Plank & W. Sölder (ed.), Kult der Vorzeit in den Alpen. Opfergaben – Opferplätze – Opferbrauchtum. Teil 1. Verlagsanstalt Athesia, Bozen 2002, pp. 519–523.
- Gerard Kaltenhauser: Die urzeitliche Zisterne von Telfes im Stubai. In: Veröffentlichungen des Museums Ferdinandeum. Tiroler Landesmuseum, Jahrgang 58, Innsbruck 1978, pp. 67–119 (Excavation report with description of the finds; zobodat.at [PDF], accessed on 27 June 2023).
