= Arthur Künig =

Italian luger

Medal record

Natural track luge

Representing Italy

World Championships
Bronze medal – third place	1996 Oberperfuss	Men's doubles

European Championships
Silver medal – second place	1995 Kandalaksha	Men's doubles
Silver medal – second place	1997 Passiria	Men's doubles

Arthur Künig is an Italian luger who competed in the 1990s. A natural track luger, he won the bronze medal in the men's doubles event at the 1996 FIL World Luge Natural Track Championships in Oberperfuss, Austria.

Künig also won two consecutive silver medals in the men's doubles event at the FIL European Luge Natural Track Championships (1995, 1997).
