= Robert Jud =

Italian luger

Medal record

Natural track luge

European Championships
Gold medal – first place	1975 Feld am See	Men's doubles
Gold medal – first place	1977 Siusi allo Sciliar	Men's doubles
Silver medal – second place	1973 Tesido	Men's doubles

Robert Jud was an Italian luger who competed in the mid-1970s. A natural track luger, he and Erich Graber won three medals in the men's doubles event at the FIL European Luge Natural Track Championships with two golds (1975, 1977) and one silver (1974).
