= Innerhofer =

Innerhofer is a Tyrolean surname. Notable people with the surname include:

- Christof Innerhofer (born 1984), Italian alpine skier
- Ingerborg Innerhofer, Austrian luger
- Katharina Innerhofer (born 1991), Austrian biathlete
