= FIL European Luge Natural Track Championships 1981 =

The FIL European Luge Natural Track Championships 1981 took place in Niedernsill, Austria. This was the second time the city has hosted the championships after having done so in 1974.

== Men's singles ==
| Medal | Athlete | Time |
|---|---|---|
| Gold | Otto Bachman (ITA) | |
| Silver | Damiano Lugon (ITA) | |
| Bronze | Othmar Neulichedl (ITA) | |

== Women's singles ==
| Medal | Athlete | Time |
|---|---|---|
| Gold | Delia Vaudan (ITA) | |
| Silver | Helene Mitterstieler (ITA) | |
| Bronze | Elfriede Pirkmann (AUT) | |

== Men's doubles ==
| Medal | Athlete | Time |
|---|---|---|
| Gold | Italy (Oswald Pornbacher, Erich Graber) | |
| Silver | Italy (Hubert Mairamhof, H. Huber) | |
| Bronze | Austria (Manfred Danklmaier, Willi Danklmaier) | |

== Medal table ==
| Rank | Nation | Gold | Silver | Bronze | Total |
|---|---|---|---|---|---|
| 1 | Italy (ITA) | 3 | 3 | 1 | 7 |
| 2 | Austria (AUT) | 0 | 0 | 2 | 2 |
| Totals (2 entries) | | 3 | 3 | 3 | 9 |
