= Rabitsch =

Rabitsch is a surname. Notable people with the surname include:

- Christoph Rabitsch (born 1996), Austrian footballer
- Harald Rabitsch, Austrian luger
- Stephan Rabitsch (born 1991), Austrian racing cyclist
- Thomas Rabitsch (born 1956), Austrian keyboardist and record producer
