= Plaikner =

Plaikner is a German surname. Notable people with the surname include:

- Michael Plaikner (fl. 1970s), Italian luger of Austrian origin
- Walter Plaikner (born 1951), Italian luger and coach of Austrian origin
