= Beikircher =

Beikircher is a surname. Notable people with the surname include:

- Georg Beikircher (born 1963), Italian bobsledder
- Werner Beikircher, Italian luger
