= Werner Mücke =

Austrian luger

Medal record

Natural track luge

Representing Austria

World Championships
Silver medal – second place	1979 Inzing	Men's doubles
Bronze medal – third place	1980 Passeier	Men's doubles

European Championships
Gold medal – first place	1978 Aurach	Men's doubles

Werner Mücke was an Austrian luger who competed in the late 1970s and early 1980s. A natural track luger, he won two medals in the men's doubles event at the FIL World Luge Natural Track Championships with a silver in 1979 and a bronze in 1980.

Mücke also won the gold medal in the men's double event at the 1978 FIL European Luge Natural Track Championships in Aurach, Austria.
