= Holzknecht =

Holzknecht is a surname. Notable people with the surname include:

- Elvira Holzknecht (born 1973), Austrian luger
- Guido Holzknecht (1872–1931), Austrian radiologist
- Lorenzo Holzknecht (1984–2023), Italian ski mountaineer
- Norbert Holzknecht (born 1976), Austrian alpine slider
