= David Mair (natural track luger and skeleton racer) =

Italian luger and former skeleton racer (born 1980)

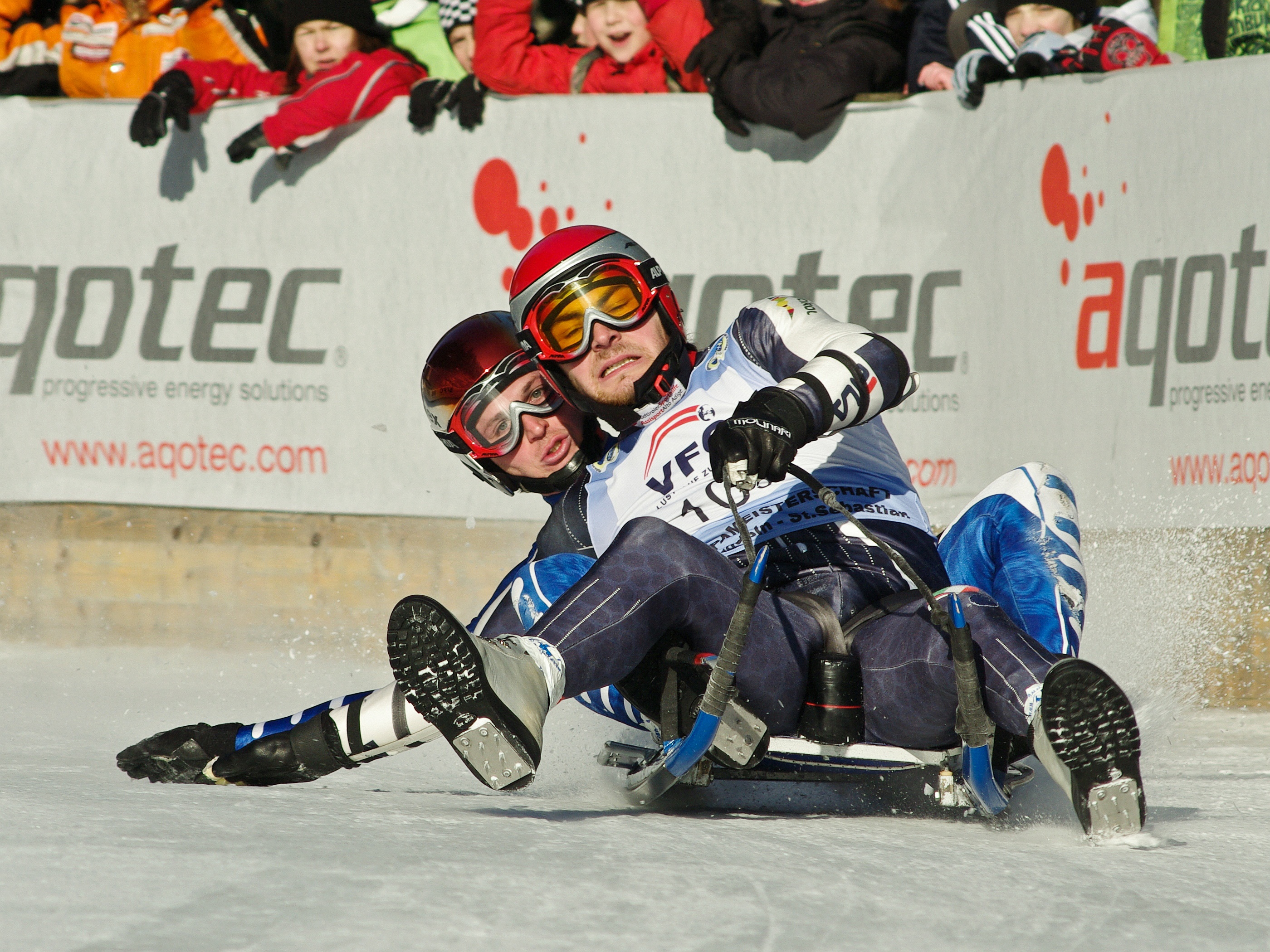
- David Mair (back) and Florian Breitenberger at the FIL European Luge Natural Track Championships 2010

Medal record

Natural track luge

World Championships
Gold medal – first place	2000 Olang-Valadora	Men's doubles
Gold medal – first place	2001 Stein an der Enns	Mixed team
Silver medal – second place	2001 Stein an der Enns	Men's doubles

European Championships
Bronze medal – third place	1999 Szczyrk	Men's doubles

David Mair (born 26 July 1980, in Meran) is an Italian luger and former skeleton racer. He competed until 2002 as a natural track luger, then until 2007 as a skeleton racer and switched back to natural track luge in 2009.

== Natural track career ==
As a natural track luger, Mair won a bronze medal at the FIL European Luge Natural Track Championships 1999, a gold medal at the FIL World Luge Natural Track Championships 2000 and a silver medal at the FIL World Luge Natural Track Championships 2001 in the Men's doubles with his brother Armin Mair. He also won a gold medal at the FIL World Luge Natural Track Championships 2001 in the mixed team event.

After five years as a skeleton racer he gave his comeback as a natural track luger in 2009.

== Skeleton career ==
In 2002 Mair switched to skeleton. In 2007 he finished seventh in the team event at the FIBT World Championships.
