= Lueger =

Lueger is a surname. Notable people with the surname include:

- Erazem Lueger (died 1484), Slovenian knight of Predjama Castle
- Karl Lueger (1844–1910), Austrian politician
- Otto Lueger (1843–1911), German civil engineer, teacher, and author

== See also ==
- Luger (disambiguation)
