= Alfred Kogler =

Austrian luger

Medal record

Natural track luge

World Championships
Gold medal – first place	1984 Kreuth	Men's singles
Silver medal – second place	1982 Feld am See	Men's doubles
Bronze medal – third place	1984 Kreuth	Men's doubles

European Championships
Gold medal – first place	1975 Feld am See	Men's singles
Bronze medal – third place	1978 Aurach	Men's doubles

Alfred Kogler was an Austrian luger who competed in the 1970s to mid-1980s. A natural track luger, he won a complete set of medals at the FIL World Luge Natural Track Championships with a gold in men's singles (1984), a silver in men's doubles (1982), and a bronze in men's doubles (1984).

Kogler also won two medals in the men's singles event at the FIL European Luge Natural Track Championships with a gold in 1975 and a bronze in 1978.
