= Andreas Schopf =

Austrian luger (born 1984)

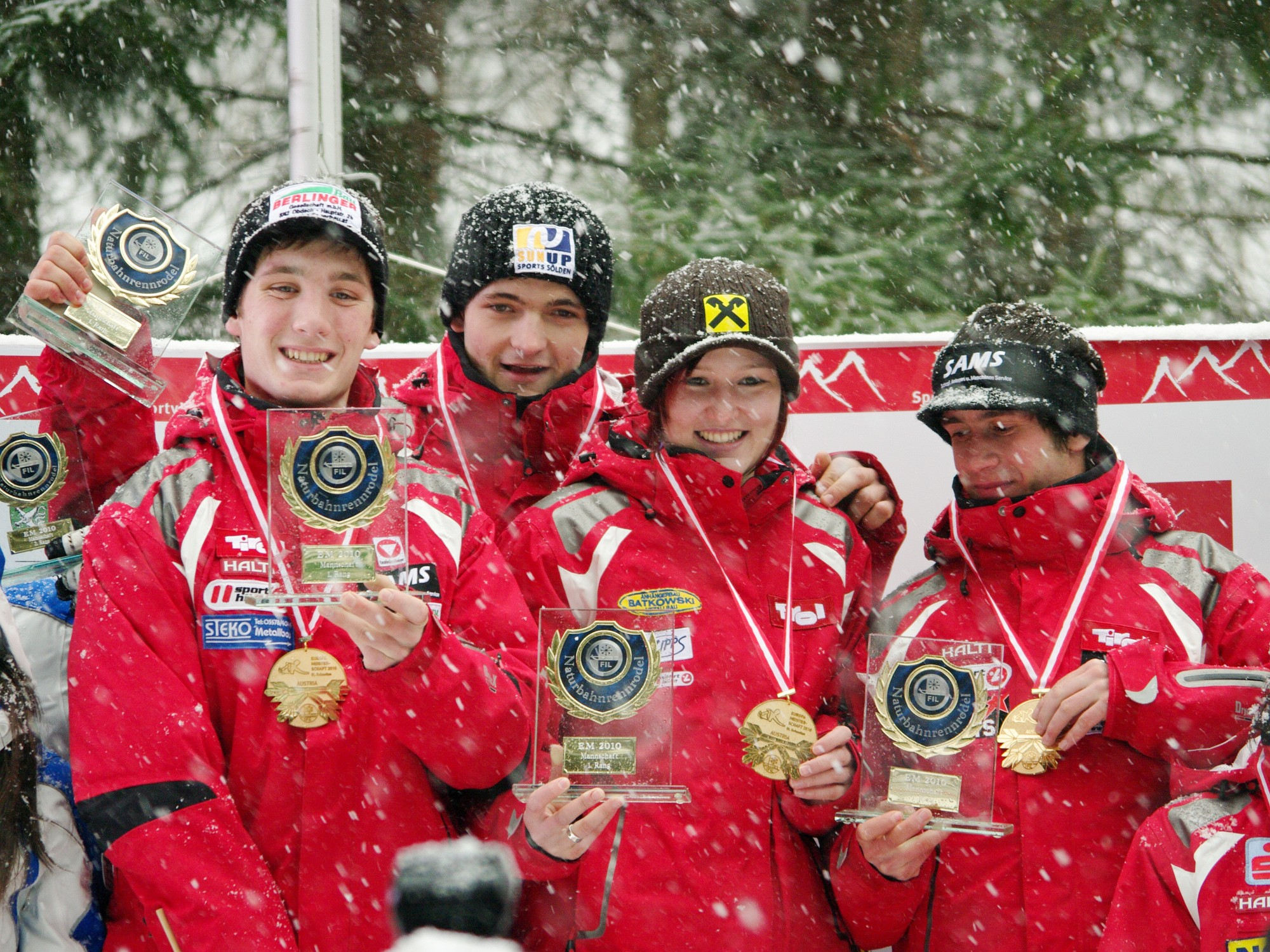
- Schopf (right) at the FIL European Luge Natural Track Championships 2009.
Medal record
Natural track luge
World Championships
Gold medal – first place	2001 Stein an der Enns	Men's doubles
Gold medal – first place	2003 Železniki	Men's doubles
Silver medal – second place	2009 Moos	Men's doubles
Silver medal – second place	2009 Moos	Mixed team
European Championships
Gold medal – first place	2002 Frantschach	Men's doubles
Gold medal – first place	2010 St. Sebastian	Mixed team
Bronze medal – third place	2004 Hüttau	Men's doubles

Andreas Schopf (born April 9, 1984) is an Austrian luger who has competed since 2000. A natural track luger, he won four medals at the FIL World Luge Natural Track Championships with two golds (Men's doubles: 2001, 2003) and two silvers (Men's doubles and mixed team: both 2009).

Schopf also won three medals at the FIL European Luge Natural Track Championships with two golds (men's doubles: 2002, mixed team: 2010) and a bronze (men's doubles: 2004).
