= Ferdinand Hirzegger =

Austrian luger (born 1976)

Medal record

Natural track luge

Representing Austria

World Championships
Silver medal – second place	2001 Stein an der Enns	Men's singles

Ferdinand Hirzeger (born 2 June 1976) is an Austrian luger who competed from 1996 to 2003. A natural track luger, he won the silver medal in the men's singles at the 2001 FIL World Luge Natural Track Championships in Stein an der Enns, Austria.
