= Manfred Danklmaier =

Austrian luger

Medal record

Natural track luge

European Championships
Gold medal – first place	1985 Szczyrk	Men's singles
Bronze medal – third place	1981 Niedernsill	Men's doubles

Manfred Danklmaier was an Austrian luger who competed in the 1980s. A natural track luger, he won two medals at the FIL European Luge Natural Track Championships with a gold in singles (1985) and a bronze in doubles (1981).
