= Helene Mitterstieler =

Italian luger

Medal record

Natural track luge

European Championships
Gold medal – first place	1977 Siusi allo Sciliar	Women's singles
Silver medal – second place	1981 Niedernsill	Women's singles

Helene Mitterstieler is an Italian luger who competed during the late 1970s and early 1980s. A natural track luger, she won two medals in the women's singles event at the FIL European Luge Natural Track Championships with a gold in 1977 and a silver in 1981.
