= FIL European Luge Natural Track Championships 1977 =

The FIL European Luge Natural Track Championships 1977 took place in Seis am Schlern, Italy.

== Men's singles ==
Medal	Athlete	Time
Gold	Erich Graber (ITA)	
Silver	Werner Belkircher (ITA)	
Bronze	Damiano Lugon (ITA)	

== Women's singles ==
Medal	Athlete	Time
Gold	Helene Mitterstieler (ITA)	
Silver	Elfriede Pirkmann (AUT)	
Bronze	Rosa Schwingshackl (ITA)	

Mitterstieler becomes the first non-Austrian to win this event at the natural track European championships.

== Men's doubles ==
Medal	Athlete	Time
Gold	Italy (R. Jud, Erich Graber)	
Silver	Italy (Johann Mair, Michael Plaikner)	
Bronze	Italy (Hubert Mairamhof, J. Pioner)	

== Medal table ==
Rank	Nation	Gold	Silver	Bronze	Total
1	Italy (ITA)	3	2	3	8
2	Austria (AUT)	0	1	0	1
Totals (2 entries)		3	3	3	9
