= Annemarie Ebner =

Austrian luger

Medal record

Natural track luge

European Championships
Silver medal – second place	1971 Vandans	Women's singles
Silver medal – second place	1975 Feld am See	Women's singles
Bronze medal – third place	1974 Niedernsill	Women's singles

Annemarie Ebner is an Austrian luger who competed in the 1970s. A natural track luger, she won three medals in the women's singles event at the FIL European Luge Natural Track Championships with two silvers (1971, 1975) and one bronze (1974).
