= FIL World Luge Natural Track Championships 1984 =

The FIL World Luge Natural Track Championships 1984 took place in Kreuth, West Germany.

== Men's singles ==
Medal	Athlete	Time
Gold	Alfred Kogler (AUT)	
Silver	Giuseppe Cerise (ITA)	
Bronze	Willi Danklmaier (AUT)	

== Women's singles ==
Medal	Athlete	Time
Gold	Delia Vaudan (ITA)	
Silver	Paula Peintner (ITA)	
Bronze	Irmgard Lanthaler (ITA)	

== Men's doubles ==
Medal	Athlete	Time
Gold	Italy (Andreas Jud, Ernst Oberhammer)	
Silver	Italy (Martin Jud, Harald Steinhauser)	
Bronze	Austria (Alfred Kogler, Franz Huber)	

== Medal table ==
Rank	Nation	Gold	Silver	Bronze	Total
1	Italy (ITA)	2	3	1	6
2	Austria (AUT)	1	0	2	3
Totals (2 entries)		3	3	3	9
