= FIL European Luge Natural Track Championships 1978 =

The FIL European Luge Natural Track Championships 1978 took place in Aurach, Austria.

== Men's singles ==
Medal	Athlete	Time
Gold	Hubert Mairamhof (ITA)	
Silver	Werner Prantl (AUT)	
Bronze	Alfred Kogler (AUT)	

== Women's singles ==
Medal	Athlete	Time
Gold	Elfriede Pirkmann (AUT)	
Silver	Roswitha Fischer (ITA)	
Bronze	Ruth Oberhöller (AUT)	

== Men's doubles ==
Medal	Athlete	Time
Gold	Austria (Werner Mücke, Helmut Huter)	
Silver	Italy (Hubert Mairamhof, J. Pioner)	
Bronze	Austria (Gebhard Oberbichler, Hubert Ausserdorfer)	

== Medal table ==
Rank	Nation	Gold	Silver	Bronze	Total
1	Austria (AUT)	2	1	3	6
2	Italy (ITA)	1	2	0	3
Totals (2 entries)		3	3	3	9
