= Siegfried Wild =

Austrian luger

Medal record

Natural track luge

European Championships
Gold medal – first place	1974 Niedernsill	Men's doubles
Bronze medal – third place	1971 Vandans	Men's doubles

Siegfried Wild was an Austrian luger who competed in the early 1970s. A natural track luger, he won two medals in the men's doubles event at the FIL European Luge Natural Track Championships with a gold in 1974 and bronze in 1971.
