= FIL European Luge Natural Track Championships 1999 =

The FIL European Luge Natural Track Championships 1999 took place in Szczyrk, Poland. This is the second this city has hosted these championships, doing so previously in 1985.

== Men's singles ==
Medal	Athlete	Time
Gold	Anton Blasbichler (ITA)	
Silver	Robert Batkowski (AUT)	
Bronze	Gerald Kallan (AUT)	

== Women's singles ==
Medal	Athlete	Time
Gold	Sonja Steinacher (ITA)	
Silver	Elvira Holzknecht (AUT)	
Bronze	Christa Gietl (ITA)	

== Men's doubles ==
Medal	Athlete	Time
Gold	Austria (Andi Ruetz, Helmut Ruetz)	
Silver	Austria (Peter Lechner, Peter Braunegger)	
Bronze	Italy (Armin Mair, David Mair)	

The Ruetz-Brothers won their third straight championships at this event.

== Medal table ==
Rank	Nation	Gold	Silver	Bronze	Total
1	Austria (AUT)	2	0	2	4
2	Italy (ITA)	1	3	1	5
Totals (2 entries)		3	3	3	9
