= Georg Antholzer =

Italian luger

Medal record

Natural track luge

European Championships
Gold medal – first place	1985 Szczyrk	Men's doubles
Silver medal – second place	1983 St. Konrad	Men's doubles

Georg Antholzer was an Italian luger who competed in the mid-1980s. A natural track luger, he won two medals in the men's doubles event at the FIL European Luge Natural Track Championships with a gold in 1985 and a silver in 1983.
