= Otto Bachmann =

Italian luger

Medal record

Natural track luge

World Championships
Silver medal – second place	1982 Feld am See	Men's singles
Bronze medal – third place	1980 Passier	Men's singles

European Championships
Gold medal – first place	1981 Niedernsill	Men's singles
Gold medal – first place	1983 St. Konrad	Men's singles
Silver medal – second place	1979 Aosta	Men's singles

Otto Bachman is a former Italian luger who competed in the late 1970s and early 1980s. A natural track luger, he won two medals in the men's singles event at the FIL World Luge Natural Track Championships (Silver: 1982, Bronze: 1980).

Bachmann found better success at the FIL European Luge Natural Track Championships where he won three medals in the men's singles event with two gold (1981, 1983) and one silver (1979).

As of 2008, he works as a sled constructor in Austria.
