= FIL World Luge Natural Track Championships 1982 =

The FIL World Luge Natural Track Championships 1982 took place in Feld am See, Austria.

== Men's singles ==
Medal	Athlete	Time
Gold	Gerhard Pircher (AUT)	
Silver	Otto Bachmann (ITA)	
Bronze	Werner Prantl (AUT)	

== Women's singles ==
Medal	Athlete	Time
Gold	Herta Hafner (ITA)	
Silver	Hilde Fuchs (AUT)	
Bronze	Paula Peintner (ITA)	

== Men's doubles ==
Medal	Athlete	Time
Gold	Italy (Andreas Jud, Ernst Oberhammer)	
Silver	Austria (Alfred Kogler, Franz Huber)	
Bronze	Austria (Werner Prantl, Florian Prantl)	

== Medal table ==
Rank	Nation	Gold	Silver	Bronze	Total
1	Italy (ITA)	2	1	1	4
2	Austria (AUT)	1	2	2	5
Totals (2 entries)		3	3	3	9
