= Franz Huber =

Austrian luger

Medal record

Natural track luge

World Championships
Silver medal – second place	1982 Feld am See	Men's doubles
Bronze medal – third place	1984 Kreuth	Men's doubles

Franz Huber is a former Austrian luger who competed during the 1980s. A natural track luger, he won two medals in the men's doubles event at the FIL World Luge Natural Track Championships with a silver in 1982 and a bronze in 1984.
