= Martin Psenner =

Italian luger (born 1976)

Medal record

Natural track luge

Representing Italy

World Championships
Bronze medal – third place	1996 Oberperfuss	Men's doubles

European Championships
Silver medal – second place	1995 Kandalaksha	Men's doubles
Silver medal – second place	1997 Passiria	Men's doubles

Martin Psenner (born 2 March 1976) is an Italian luger who has competed since 1994. A natural track luger, he won the bronze medal in the men's doubles event at the 1996 FIL World Luge Natural Track Championships in Oberperfuss, Austria.

Psenner also won two consecutive silver medals in the men's doubles event at the FIL European Luge Natural Track Championships (1995, 1997).
