= Jürgen Pezzi =

Italian luger

Medal record

Natural track luge

World Championships
Silver medal – second place	1994 Gsies	Men's doubles

European Championships
Silver medal – second place	1993 Stein an der Enns	Men's doubles
Bronze medal – third place	1995 Kandalaksha	Men's doubles

Jürgen Pezzi is an Italian luger who competed during the 1990s. A natural track luger, he won the silver medal in the men's doubles event at the 1994 FIL World Luge Natural Track Championships in Gsies, Italy.

Pezzi also won two medals in the men's doubles event at the FIL European Luge Natural Track Championships with a silver in 1993 and a bronze in 1995.
