= Gerhard Pircher =

Austrian luger

Medal record

Natural track luge

World Championships
Gold medal – first place	1982 Feld am See	Men's singles

Gerhard Pircher is a former Austrian luger who competed in the early 1980s. A natural track luger, he won the gold medal in the men's singles event at the 1982 FIL World Luge Natural Track Championships at Feld am See, Austria.
