= Robert Tomelitsch =

Austrian luger

Medal record

Natural track luge

European Championships
Bronze medal – third place	1985 Szczyrk	Men's singles
Bronze medal – third place	1993 Stein an der Enns	Men's singles

Robert Tomelitsch was an Austrian luger who competed in the 1980s and early 1990s. A natural track luger, he won two bronze medals in the men's singles event at the FIL European Luge Natural Track Championships (1985, 1993).
