= Damiano Lugon =

Italian luger (born 1956)

Medal record

Natural track luge

World Championships
Gold medal – first place	1979 Inzing	Men's doubles
Silver medal – second place	1979 Inzing	Men's singles
Silver medal – second place	1980 Passier	Men's singles
Silver medal – second place	1986 Fénis-Aosta	Men's singles

European Championships
Gold medal – first place	1979 Aosta	Men's singles
Gold medal – first place	1989 Garmisch-Partenkirchen	Men's singles
Silver medal – second place	1979 Aosta	Men's doubles
Silver medal – second place	1981 Niedernsill	Men's singles
Silver medal – second place	1985 Szczyrk	Men's singles
Bronze medal – third place	1977 Seis am Schlern	Men's singles

Damiano Lugon (born 1956) was an Italian luger who competed from the late 1970s to the late 1980s. A natural track luger, he won one gold medal and three silver medals at the FIL World Luge Natural Track Championships (Doubles: 1979, Singles: 1979, 1980, and 1986).

Lugon also earned six medals in the FIL European Luge Natural Track Championships with two gold (Singles: 1979, 1989), three silvers (Singles: 1981, 1985; Doubles: 1979), and one bronze (Singles: 1977).
