= Hilde Fuchs =

Austrian luger

Medal record

Natural track luge

World Championships
Silver medal – second place	1982 Feld am See	Women's singles

Hilde Fuchs was an Austrian luger who competed in the early 1980s. A natural track luger, she won the silver medal in the women's singles event at the 1982 FIL World Luge Natural Track Championships in Feld am See, Austria.
