= Sonja Steinacher =

Italian luger

Medal record

Natural track luge

Representing Italy

World Championships
| Gold medal – first place | 2001 Stein an der Enns | Women's singles |
| Gold medal – first place | 2003 Železniki | Women's singles |
| Gold medal – first place | 2003 Železniki | Mixed team |
| Silver medal – second place | 2000 Olang-Valadora | Women's singles |
| Bronze medal – third place | 1998 Rautavaara | Women's singles |

European Championships
| Gold medal – first place | 1999 Szczryk | Women's singles |
| Bronze medal – third place | 1997 Passiria | Women's singles |
| Bronze medal – third place | 2002 Frantschach | Women's singles |

Sonja Steinacher (born August 16, 1975 in Brixen) is a luger from Verdings/Klausen in South Tyrol who has competed for Italy since 1995. A natural track luger, she won five medals at the FIL World Luge Natural Track Championships with four medals in women's singles (Gold: 2001, 2003; Silver: 2000, Bronze: 1998) and a gold in the mixed team event (2003).

Steinacher also won three medals in the women's singles event at the FIL European Luge Natural Track Championships with one gold (1999 and two bronzes (1997, 2002).
