= Engelbert Fuchs =

Austrian luger

Medal record

Natural track luge

European Championships
| Silver medal – second place | 1975 Feld am See | Men's doubles |
| Bronze medal – third place | 1973 Taisten | Men's singles |

Engelbert Fuchs was an Austrian luger who competed in the 1970s. A natural track luger, he won two medals at the FIL European Luge Natural Track Championships with a silver in 1975 (Doubles) and a bronze in 1973 (Singles).
