= Anton Obernosterer =

Austrian luger

Medal record

Natural track luge

European Championships
Gold medal – first place	1970 Kapfenberg	Men's doubles
Gold medal – first place	1971 Vandans	Men's singles
Silver medal – second place	1970 Kapfenberg	Men's singles
Silver medal – second place	1971 Vandans	Men's doubles
Silver medal – second place	1973 Taisten	Men's doubles

Anton Obernoster was an Austrian luger who competed in the early 1970s. A natural track luger, he won five medals at the FIL European Luge Natural Track Championships with two golds (Doubles: 1970, Singles: 1971) and three silvers (Singles: 1970; Doubles: 1971, 1973).
