= Martin Jud =

Italian luger

Medal record

Natural track luge

World Championships
Silver medal – second place	1980 Passeier	Men's doubles
Silver medal – second place	1984 Kreuth	Men's doubles

European Championships
Silver medal – second place	1983 St. Konrad	Men's singles

Martin Jud was an Italian luger who competed in the early 1980s. A natural track luger, he won two silver medals in the men's doubles event at the FIL World Luge Natural Track Championships (1980, 1984).

Jud won a silver medal in the men's single event at the 1983 FIL European Luge Natural Track Championships in St. Konrad, Austria.
