= Delia Vaudan =

Italian luger

Medal record

Natural track luge

World Championships
Gold medal – first place	1979 Inzing	Women's singles
Gold medal – first place	1980 Passeier	Women's singles
Gold medal – first place	1984 Kreuth	Women's singles
Silver medal – second place	1986 Fénis-Aosta	Women's singles

European Championships
Gold medal – first place	1981 Niedernsill	Women's singles
Gold medal – first place	1985 Szczyrk	Women's singles
Gold medal – first place	1987 Jesenice	Women's singles
Gold medal – first place	1989 Garmisch-Partenkirchen	Women's singles
Bronze medal – third place	1983 St. Konrad	Women's singles
Bronze medal – third place	1991 Fié allo Sciliar	Women's singles

Delia Vaudan was an Italian luger who competed from the late 1970s to the early 1990s. A natural track luger, she won four medals in the women's singles at the FIL World Luge Natural Track Championships with one three golds (1979, 1980, and 1984) and one silver (1986).

Vaudan also won six medals at the FIL European Luge Natural Track Championships with four golds (1981, 1985, 1987, 1989) and two bronzes (1983, 1991).
