= Rosa Schwingshackl =

Italian luger

Medal record

Natural track luge

European Championships
Bronze medal – third place	1977 Seis am Schlern	Women's singles

Rosa Schwingschakl is an Italian luger who competed during the late 1970s. A natural track luger, she won the bronze medal in the women's singles event at the 1977 FIL European Luge Natural Track Championships in Seis am Schlern, Italy.
