= Manfred Als =

Austrian luger

Medal record

Natural track luge

European Championships
Bronze medal – third place	1989 Garmisch-Partenkirchen	Men's doubles
Bronze medal – third place	1993 Stein an der Enns	Men's doubles

Manfred Als was an Austrian luger who competed in the late 1980s and early 1990s. A natural track luger, he won two bronze medals in the men's doubles event at the FIL European Luge Natural Track Championships (1989, 1993).
