= Andreas Jud =

Italian luger

Medal record

Natural track luge

World Championships
Gold medal – first place	1982 Feld am See	Men's doubles
Gold medal – first place	1984 Kreuth	Men's doubles
Gold medal – first place	1990 Gsies	Men's doubles
Silver medal – second place	1986 Fénis-Aosta	Men's doubles

European Championships
Gold medal – first place	1983 St. Konrad	Men's doubles
Gold medal – first place	1987 Jesenice	Men's doubles
Bronze medal – third place	1983 St. Konrad	Men's singles
Bronze medal – third place	1985 Szczyrk	Men's doubles

Andreas Jud was an Italian luger who competed in the 1980s and early 1990s. A natural track luger, he won four medals in the men's doubles event at the FIL World Luge Natural Track Championships with three golds (1982, 1984, 1990) and one silver (1986).

Jud earned four medals at the FIL European Luge Natural Track Championships with two golds (Doubles: 1983, 1987) and two bronzes (Singles: 1983, Doubles: 1985).
