= Roswitha Fischer =

Italian luger

Medal record

Natural track luge

World Championships
Bronze medal – third place	1979 Inzing	Women's singles
Bronze medal – third place	1980 Passeier	Women's singles

European Championships
Gold medal – first place	1979 Aosta	Women's singles
Silver medal – second place	1978 Aurach	Women's singles

Roswitha Fischer was an Italian luger who competed in the late 1970s and early 1980s. A natural track luger, she won two bronze medals in the women's singles event at the FIL World Luge Natural Track Championships (1979, 1980).

Fischer also won two medals at the FIL European Luge Natural Track Championships with a gold in 1979 and a silver in 1978.
