= Willi Danklmaier =

Austrian luger

Medal record

Natural track luge

World Championships
| Silver medal – second place | 1992 Bad Goisern | Men's singles |
| Bronze medal – third place | 1984 Kreuth | Men's singles |

European Championships
| Silver medal – second place | 1993 Stein an der Enns | Men's singles |
| Bronze medal – third place | 1981 Niedernsill | Men's doubles |

Willi Danklmaier was an Austrian luger who competed from the early 1980s to the early 1990s. A natural track luger, he won two medals in the men's singles at the FIL World Luge Natural Track Championships (Silver: 1992, Bronze: 1984).

Danklmaier also won two medals at the FIL European Luge Natural Track Championships with a silver in singles in 1993 and a bronze in doubles in 1981.
