= Gabriel Obernosterer =

Austrian luger and politician

Medal record

Natural track luge

European Championships
Silver medal – second place	1971 Vandans	Men's doubles
Silver medal – second place	1973 Taisten	Men's doubles

Gabriel Obernoster (born 13 May 1955) is an Austrian former luger who competed in the early 1970s. He went on to own the Almwellness-Hotel and has been a member of the Austrian National Council (Nationalrat) since 2006. He was born in Lesachtal.

== Luging career ==
Obernosterer was active as a luger for the national squad of Austria in natural track luging. He won two silver medals in the men's doubles event at the FIL European Luge Natural Track Championships (1971, 1973).

== Political activity ==
Obernosterer was a member of the local council of his home town Lesachtal in Carinthia from 1985 until 1997. In 1995 he became a member of the Austrian Federal Economic Chamber (Wirtschaftskammer), in October 2006 he became a member of the National Council for the Austrian People’s Party (ÖVP).

Apart from his political activity, Obernosterer is a hotelier.

== Private life ==
Gabriel Obernosterer is married with two children.
