= Giuseppe Cerise =

Italian luger

Medal record

Natural track luge

World Championships
Silver medal – second place	1984 Kreuth	Men's singles

Giuseppe Cerise was an Italian luger who competed in the mid-1980s. A natural track luger, he won a silver medal in the men's singles event at the 1984 FIL World Luge Natural Track Championships in Kreuth, West Germany.
