= Hubert Mairamhof =

Italian luger

Medal record

Natural track luge

European Championships
Gold medal – first place	1978 Aurach	Men's singles
Silver medal – second place	1978 Aurach	Men's doubles
Silver medal – second place	1981 Niedernsill	Men's doubles
Bronze medal – third place	1977 Siusi allo Sciliar	Men's doubles

Hubert Mairamhof was an Italian luger who competed in the late 1970s and early 1980s. A natural track luger, he won four medals at the FIL European Luge Natural Track Championships with one gold (Singles: 1978), two silvers (Doubles: 1978, 1981), and one bronze (Doubles: 1977).
