= Paula Peintner =

Italian luger

Medal record

Natural track luge

World Championships
| Silver medal – second place | 1984 Kreuth | Women's singles |
| Bronze medal – third place | 1982 Feld am See | Women's singles |

Paula Peintner was an Italian luger who competed in the early 1980s. A natural track luger, she won two medals in the women's singles event at the FIL World Luge Natural Track Championships (Silver: 1984, Bronze: 1982).
