= Ruth Oberhöller =

Austrian luger

Medal record

Natural track luge

Representing Austria

European Championships
Bronze medal – third place	1971 Vandans	Women's singles
Bronze medal – third place	1978 Aurach	Women's singles

Ruth Oberhöller is an Austrian luger who competed in the 1970s. A natural track luger, she won two bronze medals in the women's singles event at the FIL European Luge Natural Track Championships (1971, 1978).
