= Othmar Neulichedl =

Italian luger

Medal record

Natural track luge

European Championships
Bronze medal – third place	1981 Niedernsill	Men's singles

Othmar Neulichedl was an Italian luger who competed in the early 1980s. A natural track luger, he won a bronze medal in the men's singles event at the 1981 FIL European Luge Natural Track Championships in Niedernsill, Austria.
