= Günther Steinhauser =

Italian luger

Medal record

Natural track luge

World Championships
Gold medal – first place	1994 Gsies	Men's doubles
Bronze medal – third place	1986 Fénis-Aosta	Men's doubles

European Championships
Gold medal – first place	1983 St. Konrad	Men's doubles
Gold medal – first place	1989 Garmisch-Partenkirchen	Men's doubles
Bronze medal – third place	1987 Jesenice	Men's doubles

Günther Steinhauser was an Italian luger who competed from the mid-1980s to the mid-1990s. A natural track luger, he won two medals in the men's doubles event at the FIL World Luge Natural Track Championships with a gold in 1994 and a bronze in 1986.

Steinhauser also won three medals in the men's doubles event at the FIL European Luge Natural Track Championships with two gold (1983, 1989) and one bronze (1987).
