= Irene Zechner =

Austrian luger

Medal record

Natural track luge

World Championships
Gold medal – first place	1996 Oberperfuss	Women's singles
Silver medal – second place	1990 Gsies	Women's singles
Silver medal – second place	1994 Gsies	Women's singles
Bronze medal – third place	1992 Bad Goisern	Women's singles

European Championships
Gold medal – first place	1993 Stein an der Enns	Women's singles
Gold medal – first place	1995 Kandalaksha	Women's singles
Silver medal – second place	1991 Fié allo Sciliar	Women's singles
Bronze medal – third place	1987 Jesenice	Women's singles
Bronze medal – third place	1989 Garmisch-Partenkirchen	Women's singles

Irene Zechner (née Koch) was an Austrian luger. A natural track luger, she won four medals in the women's singles event at the FIL World Luge Natural Track Championships with a gold in 1996, two silver medals in 1990 and 1994 and a bronze in 1992.

Zechner also won two gold medals in the women's singles event at the FIL European Luge Natural Track Championships (1993 and 1995), one silver medal in 1991 and two bronze medals in 1987 and 1989. She competed until 1996.
