= FIL European Luge Natural Track Championships 1983 =

The FIL European Luge Natural Track Championships 1983 took place in St. Konrad, Austria.

== Men's singles ==
| Medal | Athlete | Time |
|---|---|---|
| Gold | Otto Bachman (ITA) | |
| Silver | Martin Jud (ITA) | |
| Bronze | Andreas Jud (ITA) | |

== Women's singles ==
| Medal | Athlete | Time |
|---|---|---|
| Gold | Ingerborg Innerhofer (AUT) | |
| Silver | Irmgard Lanthaler (ITA) | |
| Bronze | Delia Vaudan (ITA) | |

== Men's doubles ==
| Medal | Athlete | Time |
|---|---|---|
| Gold | Italy (Andreas Jud, Gunther Steinhauser) | |
| Silver | Italy (Raimund Pigneter, Georg Antholzer) | |
| Bronze | Austria (Roland Trattnig, Harald Rabitsch) | |

== Medal table ==
| Rank | Nation | Gold | Silver | Bronze | Total |
|---|---|---|---|---|---|
| 1 | Italy (ITA) | 2 | 3 | 2 | 7 |
| 2 | Austria (AUT) | 1 | 0 | 1 | 2 |
| Totals (2 entries) | | 3 | 3 | 3 | 9 |
