= Erwin Eichelberger =

Austrian luger

Medal record

Natural track luge

European Championships
Silver medal – second place	1974 Niedernsill	Men's singles
Bronze medal – third place	1971 Vandans	Men's singles
Bronze medal – third place	1975 Feld am See	Men's singles

Erwin Eichelberger was an Austrian luger who competed in the 1970s. A natural track luger, he won three medals at the FIL European Luge Natural Track Championships with a silver (Singles: 1974) and two bronzes (Singles: 1971, Doubles: 1975).
