= Raimund Pigneter =

Italian luger

Medal record

Natural track luge

World Championships
Gold medal – first place	1980 Passeier	Men's doubles

European Championships
Gold medal – first place	1985 Szczyrk	Men's doubles
Silver medal – second place	1983 St. Konrad	Men's doubles

Raimund Pigneter was an Italian luger who competed in the late 1970s and early 1980s. A natural track luger, he won the gold medal in the men's doubles event at the 1980 FIL World Luge Natural Track Championships in Passeier, Italy.

Pigneter also won two medals in the men's doubles event at the FIL European Luge Natural Track Championships with a gold in 1985 and a silver in 1983.

He is the father of Patrick who competes in natural track luge.
