= Herbert Huber (luger) =

Italian luger

Medal record

Natural track luge

European Championships
Silver medal – second place	1981 Niedernsill	Men's doubles

Herbert Huber was an Italian luger who competed in the early 1980s. A natural track luger, he won a silver medal in the men's doubles event at the 1981 FIL European Luge Natural Track Championships in Niedernsill, Austria.
