= Helmut Kleinhofer =

Austrian luger

Medal record

Natural track luge

European Championships
Bronze medal – third place	1974 Niedernsill	Men's doubles

Helmut Kleinhofer was an Austrian luger who competed in the mid-1970s. A natural track luger, he won the bronze medal in the men's doubles event at the 1974 FIL European Luge Natural Track Championships in Niedernsill, Austria.
