= Klara Niedertscheider =

Austrian luger

Medal record

Natural track luge

European Championships
Gold medal – first place	1971 Vandans	Women's singles
Gold medal – first place	1974 Niedernsill	Women's singles
Gold medal – first place	1975 Feld am See	Women's singles
Silver medal – second place	1970 Kapfenberg	Women's singles

Klara Niedertscheider is an Austrian luger who competed in the early 1970s. A natural track luger, she won the four medals in the women's singles event at the FIL European Luge Natural Track Championships with three golds (1971, 1974, 1975) and one silver (1970).
