= Manfred Gräber =

Italian luger

Medal record

Natural track luge

World Championships
Gold medal – first place	1994 Gsies	Men's doubles
Silver medal – second place	1998 Rautavaara	Men's doubles

European Championships
Gold medal – first place	1987 Jesenice	Men's singles
Gold medal – first place	1995 Kandalaksha	Men's singles
Silver medal – second place	1989 Garmisch-Partenkirchen	Men's doubles
Silver medal – second place	1997 Passiria	Men's singles
Bronze medal – third place	1989 Garmisch-Partenkirchen	Men's singles

Manfred Gräber is an Italian luger who competed during the late 1980s and 1990s. A natural track luger, he won two medals in the men's doubles event at the FIL World Luge Natural Track Championships with a gold in 1994 and a silver in 1998.

Gräber found better success at the FIL European Luge Natural Track Championships where he won five medals. This included four medals in singles (gold: 1987, 1995; silver: 1997, bronze: 1989) and one in doubles (silver: 1989).
