= Christian Hafner =

Italian luger (born 1972)

Medal record

Natural track luge

Representing Italy

World Championships
Silver medal – second place	1994 Gsies	Men's doubles

European Championships
Silver medal – second place	1993 Stein an der Enns	Men's doubles
Silver medal – second place	1997 Moos in Passeier	Men's doubles
Bronze medal – third place	1995 Kandalaksha	Men's doubles

Christian Hafner (born 19 June 1972) is an Italian luger who competed during the 1990s. A natural track luger, he won the silver medal in the men's doubles event at the 1994 FIL World Luge Natural Track Championships in Gsies, Italy.

Hafner also won three medals in the men's doubles event at the FIL European Luge Natural Track Championships with two silver in 1993 and 1997 and a bronze in 1995.
