= Gebhard Oberbichler =

Austrian luger

Medal record

Natural track luge

European Championships
Bronze medal – third place	1978 Aurach	Men's doubles

Gebhard Oberbichler was an Austrian luger who competed in the late 1970s. A natural track luger, he won the bronze medal in the men's doubles event at the 1978 FIL European Luge Natural Track Championships in Aurach, Austria.
