= Elfriede Pirkmann =

Austrian luger

Medal record

Natural track luge

European Championships
Gold medal – first place	1973 Taisten	Women's singles
Gold medal – first place	1978 Aurach	Women's singles
Silver medal – second place	1974 Niedernsill	Women's singles
Silver medal – second place	1977 Seis am Schlern	Women's singles
Bronze medal – third place	1975 Feld am See	Women's singles
Bronze medal – third place	1981 Niedernsill	Women's singles

Elfriede Pirkmann is an Austrian luger who competed during the 1970s and early 1980s. A natural track luger, she won six medals in the women's singles event at the FIL European Luge Natural Track Championships with two golds (1973, 1978), two silvers (1974, 1977), and two bronzes (1975, 1981).
