= Oswald Pornbacher =

Italian luger

Medal record

Natural track luge

World Championships
| Gold medal – first place | 1980 Passeier | Men's doubles |

European Championships
| Gold medal – first place | 1981 Niedernsill | Men's doubles |
| Bronze medal – third place | 1979 Aosta | Men's doubles |

Oswald Pornbacher was an Italian luger who competed in the late 1970s and early 1980s. A natural track luger, he won the gold medal in the men's doubles event at the 1980 FIL World Luge Natural Track Championships in Passeier, Italy.

Pornbacher also won two medals in the men's doubles event at the FIL European Luge Natural Track Championships with a gold in 1981 and a bronze in 1979.
