= Josef Pioner =

Italian luger

Medal record

Natural track luge

European Championships
Silver medal – second place	1978 Aurach	Men's doubles
Bronze medal – third place	1977 Siusi allo Sciliar	Men's doubles

Josef Pioner was an Italian luger who competed in the late 1970s. A natural track luger, he won two medals in the men's doubles event at the FIL European Luge Natural Track Championships with a silver in 1978 and a bronze in 1977.
