= Herta Hafner =

Italian luger

Medal record

Natural track luge

World Championships
Gold medal – first place	1982 Feld am See	Women's singles

European Championships
Bronze medal – third place	1979 Aosta	Women's singles
Bronze medal – third place	1985 Szczyrk	Women's singles

Herta Hafner was an Italian luger who competed from the late 1970s to the mid-1980s. A natural track luger, she won the gold medal in the women's singles event at the 1982 FIL World Luge Natural Track Championships in Feld am See, Austria.

Hafner also earned to bronze medals in the women's singles event at the FIL European Luge Natural Track Championships (1979, 1985).
