= Helmut Huter =

Austrian luger

Medal record

Natural track luge

World Championships
Silver medal – second place	1979 Inzing	Men's doubles
Bronze medal – third place	1980 Passeier	Men's doubles

European Championships
Gold medal – first place	1978 Aurach	Men's doubles
Bronze medal – third place	1975 Feld am See	Men's singles

Helmut Huter was an Austrian luger who competed in the late 1970s and early 1980s. He won two medals in the men's doubles event at the FIL World Luge Natural Track Championships with a silver in 1979 and a bronze in 1980.

Huter also two medals at the FIL European Luge Natural Track Championships with a gold in 1978 (Doubles) and a bronze in 1975 (Singles).
