= Jeanette Koppensteiner =

Austrian luger

Medal record

Natural track luge

World Championships
Gold medal – first place	1990 Gsies	Women's singles

European Championships
Silver medal – second place	1989 Garmisch-Partenkirchen	Women's singles

Jeanette Koppensteiner was an Austrian luger who competed in the late 1980s and early 1990s. A natural track luger, she won the women's singles gold medal at the 1990 FIL World Luge Natural Track Championships in Gsies, Italy.

Koppensteiner also won a silver medal in the women's singles event at the 1989 FIL European Luge Natural Track Championships in Garmisch-Partenkirchen, West Germany.
