= Christa Fontana =

Italian luger

Medal record

Natural track luge

World Championships
Silver medal – second place	1980 Passeier	Women's singles

European Championships
Silver medal – second place	1979 Aosta	Women's singles

Christa Fontana was an Italian luger who competed in the late 1970s and early 1980s. As a natural luger, she won a silver medal in the women's singles event at the 1980 FIL World Luge Natural Track Championships in Passeier, Italy, as well as one in the women's singles event at the 1979 FIL European Luge Natural Track Championships in Aosta.
