= FIL European Luge Natural Track Championships 1970 =

The FIL European Luge Natural Track Championships 1970 took place in Kapfenberg, Austria.

== Men's singles ==
Medal	Athlete	Time
Gold	Ernst Stangl (AUT)	
Silver	Anton Obernosterer (AUT)	
Bronze	Gottfried Lexer (AUT)	

== Women's singles ==
Medal	Athlete	Time
Gold	Hannelore Plattner (AUT)	
Silver	Klara Niedertscheider (AUT)	
Bronze	Maria Dibiasi (ITA)	

== Men's doubles ==
Medal	Athlete	Time
Gold	Austria (Anton Obernosterer, Josef Lexer)	
Silver	Italy (H. Graber, Erich Graber)	
Bronze	Austria (Josef Hilgartner, Gerhard Sandhofer)	

== Medal table ==
Rank	Nation	Gold	Silver	Bronze	Total
1	Austria (AUT)	3	2	2	7
2	Italy (ITA)	0	1	1	2
Totals (2 entries)		3	3	3	9
