= Harald Rabitsch =

Austrian luger

Medal record

Natural track luge

European Championships
| Bronze medal – third place | 1983 St. Konrad | Men's doubles |

Harald Rabitsch was an Austrian luger who competed in the 1980s. A natural track luger, he won the bronze medal in the men's doubles event at the 1983 FIL European Luge Natural Track Championships in St. Konrad, Austria.
