= Howie Ruetz =

American football player (1927–1999)

No. 75
- Position: Defensive tackle

Personal information
- Born: August 18, 1927; Racine, Wisconsin, U.S.
- Died: July 2, 1999 (aged 71)
- Listed height: 6 ft 3 in (1.91 m)
- Listed weight: 255 lb (116 kg)

Career information
- High school: St. Catherine's (Racine)
- College: Loras (1950)
- NFL draft: 1951: 26th round, 313th overall pick

Career history
- Green Bay Packers (1951–1953)

Career NFL statistics
- Interceptions: 1
- Fumble recoveries: 3
- Stats at Pro Football Reference

Howard Peter Ruetz (August 18, 1927 – July 2, 1999) was a professional American football defensive tackle in the National Football League (NFL).

Born and raised in Racine, WI, he was the son of George "Babe" Ruetz, coach of the Racine Legion. He attended Racine St. Catherine's High School, graduating in 1947. He played at the collegiate level at Loras College, graduating in 1951, and the Green Bay Packers (1951–1953). He is a member of the Loras College 1947 Hall of Fame football team and the Racine County Sports Hall of Fame (2017).
