= Ernst Marmsoler =

Italian luger

Medal record

Natural track luge

European Championships
Silver medal – second place	1989 Garmisch-Partenkirchen	Men's doubles

Ernst Marmsoler was an Italian luger who competed in the 1980s. A natural track luger, he won the silver medal in the men's doubles event at the 1989 FIL European Luge Natural Track Championships in Garmisch-Partenkirchen, West Germany. In 1981, he also won a bronze medal in the men's doubles event at the 15th European Cup in Unterammergau.
