= FIL World Luge Natural Track Championships 1980 =

The FIL World Luge Natural Track Championships 1980 took place in Passeier, Italy.

== Men's singles ==
Medal	Athlete	Time
Gold	Erich Graber (ITA)	
Silver	Damiano Lugon (ITA)	
Bronze	Otto Bachmann (ITA)	

== Women's singles ==
Medal	Athlete	Time
Gold	Delia Vaudan (ITA)	
Silver	Christa Fontana (ITA)	
Bronze	Roswitha Fischer (ITA)	

== Men's doubles ==
Medal	Athlete	Time
Gold	Italy (Oswald Pornbacher, Raimund Pigneter)	
Silver	Italy (Martin Jud, Harald Steinhauser)	
Bronze	Austria (Werner Mücke, Helmut Huter)	

== Medal table ==
Rank	Nation	Gold	Silver	Bronze	Total
1	Italy (ITA)	3	3	2	8
2	Austria (AUT)	0	0	1	1
Totals (2 entries)		3	3	3	9
