= Marlies Wagner =

Austrian luger (born 1983)

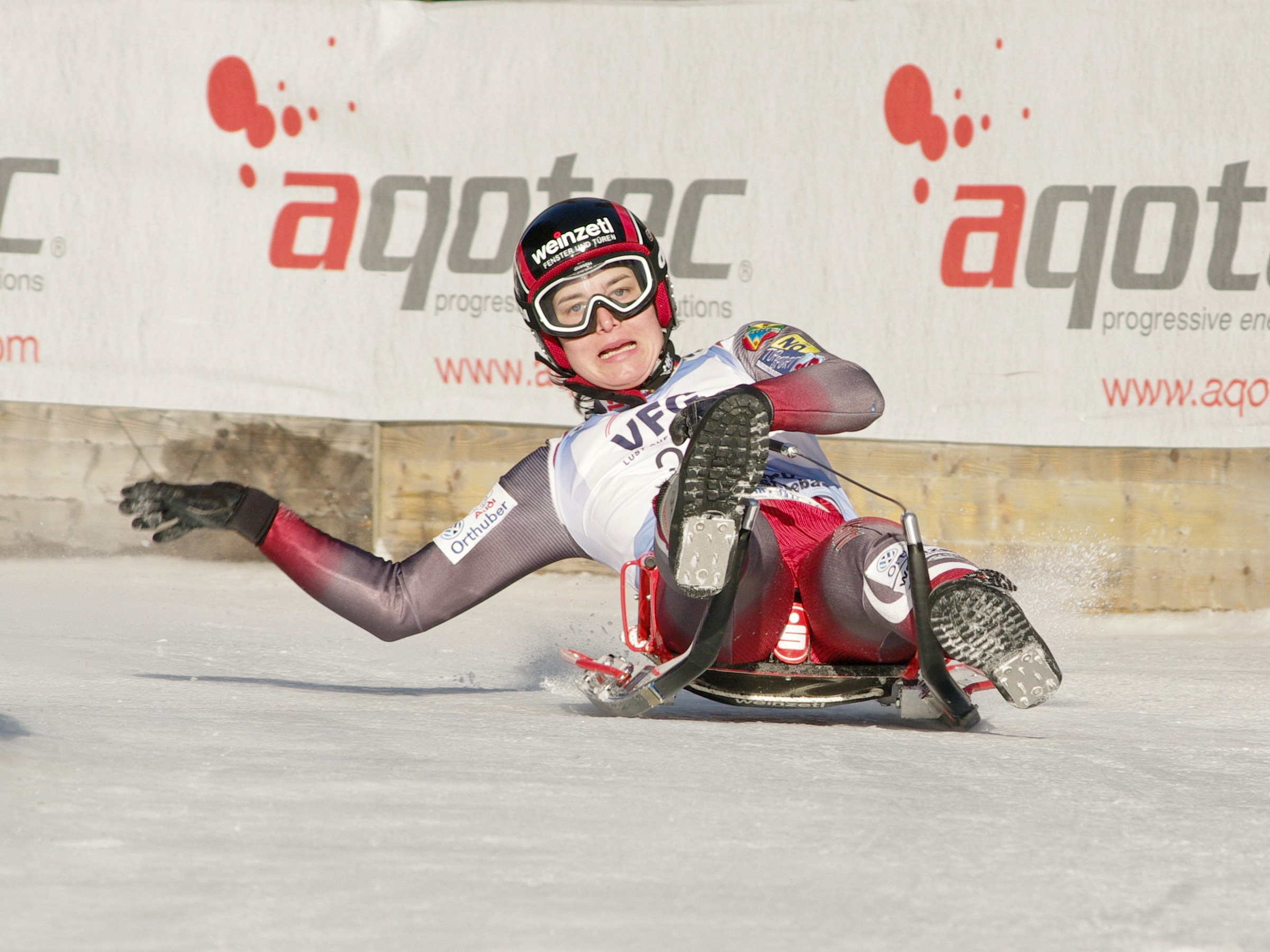

Medal record

Natural track luge

World Championships
Silver medal – second place	2001 Stein an der Enns	Mixed team
Bronze medal – third place	2007 Grande Prairie	Mixed team

World Championships
Bronze medal – third place	2010 St. Sebastian	Mixed team

Marlies Wagner (born 25 May 1983) is an Austrian luger who has competed since 1999. A natural track luger, she won two medals in the mixed team event at the FIL World Luge Natural Track Championships (Silver: 2001, Bronze: 2007).

Wagner also won a bronze in the mixed team event at the FIL European Luge Natural Track Championships 2010 in Sankt Sebastian, Austria.
