= Andrea Millet =

Italian luger

Medal record

Natural track luge

World Championships
Gold medal – first place	1979 Inzing	Men's doubles

European Championships
Silver medal – second place	1979 Aosta	Men's doubles
Bronze medal – third place	1979 Aosta	Men's singles

Andrea Millet was an Italian luger who competed in the late 1970s. A natural track luger, he won a gold medal in the men's doubles event at the 1979 FIL World Luge Natural Track Championships in Inzing, Austria.

Millet also won two medals at the 1979 FIL European Luge Natural Track Championships in Aosta, Italy with a silver in the doubles and a bronze in the singles.
