= Gerhard Sandhofer =

Austrian luger (born 1948)

Medal record

Natural track luge

European Championships
Bronze medal – third place	1970 Kapfenberg	Men's doubles

Gerhard Sandhofer (born 19 September 1948) is a former Austrian luger who competed in the early 1970s. A natural track luger, he won the bronze medal in the men's doubles event at the 1970 FIL European Luge Natural Track Championships in Kapfenberg, Austria.
