= FIL European Luge Natural Track Championships 1997 =

The FIL European Luge Natural Track Championships 1997 took place in Moos in Passeier, Italy.

== Men's singles ==
Medal	Athlete	Time
Gold	Reinhard Gruber (ITA)	
Silver	Manfred Graber (ITA)	
Bronze	Gerhard Pilz (AUT)	

== Women's singles ==
Medal	Athlete	Time
Gold	Lyubov Panyutina (RUS)	
Silver	Elvira Holzknecht (AUT)	
Bronze	Sonja Steinacher (ITA)	

Panyutina followed up her silver medal at the previous championships with a gold medal this time.

== Men's doubles ==
Medal	Athlete	Time
Gold	Austria (Andi Ruetz, Helmut Ruetz)	
Silver	Italy (Martin Psenner, Christian Hafner)	
Bronze	Austria (Reinhard Beer, Herbert Kögl)	

== Medal table ==
Rank	Nation	Gold	Silver	Bronze	Total
1	Italy (ITA)	1	2	1	4
2	Austria (AUT)	1	1	2	4
3	Russia (RUS)	1	0	0	1
Totals (3 entries)		3	3	3	9
