= FIL European Luge Natural Track Championships 1979 =

The FIL European Luge Natural Track Championships 1979 took place in Aosta, Italy.

== Men's singles ==
Medal	Athlete	Time
Gold	Damiano Lugon (ITA)	
Silver	Otto Bachman (ITA)	
Bronze	Andrea Millet (ITA)	

== Women's singles ==
Medal	Athlete	Time
Gold	Roswitha Fischer (ITA)	
Silver	Christa Fontana (ITA)	
Bronze	Herta Hafner (ITA)	

== Men's doubles ==
Medal	Athlete	Time
Gold	Austria (Werner Prantl, Florian Prantl)	
Silver	Italy (Damiano Lugon, Andrea Millet)	
Bronze	Italy (Oswald Pornbacher, Erich Graber)	

== Medal table ==
Rank	Nation	Gold	Silver	Bronze	Total
1	Italy (ITA)	2	3	3	8
2	Austria (AUT)	1	0	0	1
Totals (2 entries)		3	3	3	9
