= Babe Ruetz =

American football player and coach (1893–1927)

Profile
- Position: Head coach

Personal information
- Born: September 23, 1893; Racine, Wisconsin, U.S.
- Died: May 24, 1927 (aged 33); Racine, Wisconsin, U.S.
- Listed weight: 285 lb (129 kg)

Career history
- 1922–1924: Racine Legion
- Coaching profile at Pro Football Reference

George Gerhard "Babe" Ruetz (September 23, 1893 – May 24, 1927) was a sports promoter and professional football coach for the Racine Legion of the National Football League (NFL). Coaching the team from 1922 through 1924, Ruetz posted a record of 14 wins, 11 losses, and 6 ties, for an all-time winning percentage of .560.

A gridiron giant of the era, weighing in at 285 pounds, Ruetz was regarded as one of Racine, Wisconsin's best amateur football players of the 1910s and helped manage the local semi-pro club in that city prior to the establishment of the Horlick-Legion team in 1922.

Ruetz died in 1927 at the age of 33, following a protracted illness.

== Biography ==
=== Early life ===
George Ruetz was born September 23, 1893, in Racine, Wisconsin. He was later nicknamed "Babe" Ruetz as a play on the name of George Herman "Babe" Ruth, iconic slugger of the New York Yankees.

Beginning in 1910, Ruetz made a name for himself locally playing on various school and local semi-pro teams. He was elected the president of the Racine Football Association in August 1914, in charge of organizing the town semi-pro team that played that fall.

In 1918 Ruetz volunteered and became a member of the American armed forces, playing football for one of the many camp teams.

=== NFL coaching career ===
In 1921, Ruetz persuaded officials in the Racine post of the American Legion to sponsor a football team. Assisting in the club's creation through financial sponsorship was William Horlick, president of his family's eponymous malted milk company in Racine, a profitable firm of the day. Horlick also provided use of his company's employee ball yard, Horlick Athletic Field, for home games.

The Racine Horlick-Legion team joined the fledgling National Football League (NFL) in 1922, with Ruetz traveling to Canton, Ohio to make the $100 payment necessary to secure a club franchise for the legion.

The Racine Legion team remained an integral part of the NFL for three season, 1922 through 1924, during which Ruetz served as the team's head coach and general manager. Ruetz scheduled the team's first NFL game, played against the Chicago Bears on October 1, 1922, before a crowd of 4,000.

Unfortunately, expenses outstripped revenues for the Horlick-Legion team and significant financial losses were accrued in 1922 and 1923. The Legion post solicited donations from local fans and hosted fundraising event in an effort to offset this negative cash flow, managing to cobble together funds enough to play one final season, that of 1924. Ruetz was forced to step back from his managerial role in this third season, burdened by the time needed to maintain his local grocery business.

During his three year time at the helm of the Racine NFL team, the club posted a record of 14 wins, 11 losses, and 6 ties, for an all-time winning percentage of .560.

=== Life after football ===
Outside of football, George owned and operated a grocery store in Racine. He was a prominent figure in Racine's North Side Businessmen's Association and a member of the Knights of Columbus, the Fraternal Order of Eagles, and the Benevolent and Protective Order of Elks.

Ruetz was active in promoting baseball in Racine during the summer of 1926, serving as Secretary and Treasurer of the Racine Baseball Association.

=== Death and legacy ===
George Ruetz died the night of May 24, 1927, at his home in Racine following a lengthy illness. He was just 33 years old at the time of his death. He was buried with full military honors at Holy Cross Catholic Cemetery in Racine on May 27.

Ruetz was survived by one son, George Junior. A second son, Howard, would be born on August 18, 1927, several months after his father's death. Howie Ruetz, would go on to play 20 games for the Green Bay Packers of the NFL from 1951 to 1953.

A nephew, Joe Ruetz, would appear in 26 games for the Chicago Rockets of the All-America Football Conference (AAFC) in 1946 and 1948.

Ruetz's most fitting eulogy was offered in the local press during the tumultuous days ahead of the 1925 season, when he fought — unsuccessfully — to put together necessary funding for the Racine Legion team to continue in the NFL. The Racine Journal Times wrote:

"George (Babe) Ruetz, father of football in this city and who was responsible for building up the great Legion team in the National Professional Football League, is behind the plan to save Racine's franchise in the major league... It was George Ruetz who induced the Legion to go into the National Pro league. For years past he has been connected with amateur and semi-pro football teams and he has realized the big hold the game was getting in this country. Racine, he saw, was out of the college class and the only high type of football fans here could hope to see would be the professional variety.... George, with the limited resources of the Racine [Legion] post back of him but with the whole-soled assistance of...others went out and assembled two wonderful teams in 1922-23. His fighting teams earned the rep of being the closest approach to college organizations in the league. All this was because of Ruetz's guiding hand on the helm."
