= Gottfried Lexer =

Austrian luger

Medal record

Natural track luge

European Championships
| Silver medal – second place | 1971 Vandans | Men's singles |
| Bronze medal – third place | 1970 Kapfenberg | Men's singles |

Gottfried Lexer was an Austrian luger who competed in the early 1970s. A natural track luger, he won two medals in the men's singles event at the FIL European Luge Natural Track Championships with a silver in 1971 and a bronze in 1970
