= Ingerborg Innerhofer =

Austrian luger

Medal record

Natural track luge

European Championships
Gold medal – first place	1983 St. Konrad	Women's singles

Ingerborg Innerhofer was an Austrian luger who competed in the early 1980s. A natural track luger, she won the gold medal in the women's singles at the 1983 FIL European Luge Natural Track Championships in St. Konrad, Austria.
