= Erich Graber =

Italian luger

Medal record

Natural track luge

World Championships
Gold medal – first place	1980 Passier	Men's singles
Bronze medal – third place	1979 Inzing	Men's singles

European Championships
Gold medal – first place	1974 Niedernsill	Men's singles
Gold medal – first place	1975 Feld am See	Men's doubles
Gold medal – first place	1977 Siusi allo Sciliar	Men's singles
Gold medal – first place	1977 Siusi allo Sciliar	Men's doubles
Gold medal – first place	1981 Niedernsill	Men's doubles
Silver medal – second place	1970 Kapfenberg	Men's doubles
Silver medal – second place	1974 Niedernsill	Men's doubles
Silver medal – second place	1975 Feld am See	Men's singles
Bronze medal – third place	1979 Aosta	Men's doubles

Luge

World Championships
Bronze medal – third place	1965 Davos	Men's singles

Erich Graber was an Italian luger who competed from the mid-1960s to the early 1980s. A natural track luger, he won two medals in the men's singles event at the FIL World Luge Natural Track Championships (Gold: 1980, Bronze: 1979).

Graber also was successful in the FIL European Luge Natural Track Championships with nine medals, including five golds (Singles: 1974, 1975, 1977; Doubles: 1977, 1981), three silvers (Singles: 1975, Doubles: 1970, 1974), and one bronze (Doubles: 1979).

Graber also won a bronze in the men's singles event at the 1965 FIL World Luge Championships in Davos, Switzerland (Note: The first natural track championships in Europe did not occur until 1970 while the first natural track world championships did not occur until 1979. The first permanent artificially refrigerated bobsleigh, luge, or skeleton track was not constructed until 1969.).
