= FIL European Luge Natural Track Championships 1971 =

Austria FIL European Luge Natural Track Championships

The FIL European Luge Natural Track Championships 1971 took place in Vandans, Austria.

== Men's singles ==
Medal	Athlete	Time
Gold	Anton Obernosterer (AUT)	
Silver	Gottfried Lexer (AUT)	
Bronze	Erwin Eichelberger (AUT)	

== Women's singles ==
Medal	Athlete	Time
Gold	Klara Niedertscheider (AUT)	
Silver	Annemarie Ebner (AUT)	
Bronze	Ruth Oberhöller (AUT)	

== Men's doubles ==
Medal	Athlete	Time
Gold	Italy (S. Graber, J. Niedermaier)	
Silver	Austria (Anton Obernosterer, Gabriel Obernosterer)	
Bronze	Austria (Siegfried Wild, Othmar Hofer)	

== Medal table ==
Rank	Nation	Gold	Silver	Bronze	Total
1	Austria (AUT)	2	3	3	8
2	Italy (ITA)	1	0	0	1
Totals (2 entries)		3	3	3	9
