= Arnold Luger =

Italian luger

Medal record

Natural track luge

European Championships
Gold medal – first place	1989 Garmisch-Partenkirchen	Men's doubles
Bronze medal – third place	1987 Jesenice	Men's doubles

Arnold Luger was an Italian luger who competed during the 1980s. A natural track luger, he won two medals in the men's doubles event at the FIL European Luge Natural Track Championships with a gold in 1989 and a bronze in 1987.
