= Maria Dibiasi =

Italian luger

Medal record

Natural track luge

European Championships
Bronze medal – third place	1970 Kapfenberg	Women's singles

Maria Dibiasi is an Italian luger who competed in the early 1970s. A natural track luger, she won the bronze medal in the women's singles event at the 1970 FIL European Luge Natural Track Championships in Kapfenberg, Austria.
