= FIL European Luge Natural Track Championships 1989 =

The FIL European Luge Natural Track Championships 1989 took place in Garmisch-Partenkirchen, West Germany.

== Men's singles ==
| Medal | Athlete | Time |
|---|---|---|
| Gold | Damiano Lugon (ITA) | |
| Silver | Gerhard Pilz (AUT) | |
| Bronze | Manfred Graber (ITA) | |

== Women's singles ==
| Medal | Athlete | Time |
|---|---|---|
| Gold | Delia Vaudan (ITA) | |
| Silver | Jeanette Koppensteiner (AUT) | |
| Bronze | Irene Koch (AUT) | |

== Men's doubles ==
| Medal | Athlete | Time |
|---|---|---|
| Gold | Italy (Arnold Luger, Gunther Steinhauser) | |
| Silver | Italy (Manfred Graber, E. Marmsoler) | |
| Bronze | Austria (Reinhold Bachmann, Manfred Als) | |

== Medal table ==
| Rank | Nation | Gold | Silver | Bronze | Total |
|---|---|---|---|---|---|
| 1 | Italy (ITA) | 3 | 1 | 1 | 5 |
| 2 | Austria (AUT) | 0 | 2 | 2 | 4 |
| Totals (2 entries) | | 3 | 3 | 3 | 9 |
