= FIL World Luge Natural Track Championships 1979 =

The FIL World Luge Natural Track Championships 1979 took place in Inzing, Austria.

== Men's singles ==
Medal	Athlete	Time
Gold	Werner Prantl (AUT)	
Silver	Damiano Lugon (ITA)	
Bronze	Erich Graber (ITA)	

== Women's singles ==
Medal	Athlete	Time
Gold	Delia Vaudan (ITA)	
Silver	Ingrid Zameter (ITA)	
Bronze	Roswitha Fischer (ITA)	

== Men's doubles ==
Medal	Athlete	Time
Gold	Italy (Damiano Lugon, Andrea Millet)	
Silver	Austria (Werner Mücke, Helmut Huter)	
Bronze	Austria (Werner Prantl, Florian Prantl)	

== Medal table ==
Rank	Nation	Gold	Silver	Bronze	Total
1	Italy (ITA)	2	2	2	6
2	Austria (AUT)	1	1	1	3
Totals (2 entries)		3	3	3	9
