= Irmgard Lanthaler =

Italian luger

Medal record

Natural track luge

World Championships
Gold medal – first place	1986 Fénis-Aosta	Women's singles
Bronze medal – third place	1984 Kreuth	Women's singles

European Championships
Silver medal – second place	1983 St. Konrad	Women's singles
Silver medal – second place	1985 Szczyrk	Women's singles

Irmgard Lanthaler was an Italian luger who competed in the mid-1980s. A natural track luger, she won two medals in the women's singles event at the FIL World Luge Natural Track Championships (Gold: 1986, Bronze: 1984).

Lanthaler also won two silver medals in the women's singles event at the FIL European Luge Natural Track Championships (1983, 1985).
