= FIL European Luge Natural Track Championships 1975 =

The FIL European Luge Natural Track Championships 1975 took place in Feld am See, Austria.

== Men's singles ==
Medal	Athlete	Time
Gold	Alfred Kogler (AUT)	
Silver	Erich Graber (ITA)	
Bronze	Helmut Huter (AUT)	

== Women's singles ==
Medal	Athlete	Time
Gold	Klara Niedertscheider (AUT)	
Silver	Annemarie Ebner (AUT)	
Bronze	Elfriede Pirkmann (AUT)	

Niederscheider won her third gold in the last four natural track European championships and fourth in the past five.

== Men's doubles ==
Medal	Athlete	Time
Gold	Italy (R. Jud, Erich Graber)	
Silver	Austria (Engelbert Fuchs, Gottfried Kreuzer)	
Bronze	Austria (Ernst Stangl, Erwin Eichelberger)	

== Medal table ==
Rank	Nation	Gold	Silver	Bronze	Total
1	Austria (AUT)	2	2	3	7
2	Italy (ITA)	1	1	0	2
Totals (2 entries)		3	3	3	9
