= Helmut Ruetz =

Austrian luger (born 1972)

Medal record

Natural track luge

World Championships
Gold medal – first place	1998 Rautavaara	Men's doubles
Silver medal – second place	1996 Oberperfuss	Men's doubles

European Championships
Gold medal – first place	1995 Kandalaksha	Men's doubles
Gold medal – first place	1997 Passiria	Men's doubles
Gold medal – first place	1999 Szczyrk	Men's doubles

Helmut Ruetz (born 1972) is an Austrian luger who competed during the 1990s. A natural track luger, he won two medals in the men's doubles event at the FIL World Luge Natural Track Championships with a gold in 1998 and a silver in 1996.

Ruetz also won three consecutive gold medals in the men's doubles event at the FIL European Luge Natural Track Championships (1995, 1997, 1999).
