= Jim Hilgartner =

American author of poetry and fiction

Jim Hilgartner is an American author of poetry and fiction. He writes primarily short fiction, often composing longer stories from assembled shorter vignettes. He received his MFA from the University of Alabama. He taught at Alabama and at Alabama Southern Community College, and since 2006 has been teaching English at Huntingdon College in Montgomery, Alabama. Hilgartner has twice received the Fellowship in Literature from the Alabama State Council on the Arts: in 2001 and again in 2011.
