= Ernst Stangl =

Austrian luger

Medal record

Natural track luge

European Championships
Gold medal – first place	1970 Kapfenberg	Men's singles
Gold medal – first place	1973 Taisten	Men's singles
Bronze medal – third place	1975 Feld am See	Men's doubles

Ernst Stangl was an Austrian luger who competed in the early 1970s. A natural track luger, he won two gold medals in the men's singles (1970, 1973) and a bronze medal in the men's doubles (1975).
