= Lugar =

Lugar may refer to:

== People ==
- Richard Lugar (1932–2019), United States senator
- Robert Lugar (1773–1855), English architect and engineer

== Places and landmarks ==
- Lugar (country subdivision), in Portugal and Spain
- Lugar, East Ayrshire, a small village in southwest Scotland
- Lugar Research Center, a laboratory in Tbilisi, Georgia

== Other uses ==
- Lugar Water, a river in Scotland
- Lugar Heights, an animated television series

== See also ==
- Luger (disambiguation)
