= Michael Plaikner =

Italian luger

Medal record

Natural track luge

European Championships
Silver medal – second place	1977 Seis am Schlern	Men's doubles

Michael Plaikner was an Italian luger who competed in the mid-1970s. A natural track luger, he won a silver medal with Johann Mair in the men's doubles event at the 1977 FIL European Luge Natural Track Championships in Seis am Schlern, Italy.
