= FIL European Luge Natural Track Championships 1987 =

The FIL European Luge Natural Track Championships 1987 took place in Jesenice, Yugoslavia.

== Men's singles ==
Medal	Athlete	Time
Gold	Manfred Graber (ITA)	
Silver	Harald Steinhauser (ITA)	
Bronze	Erhard Mahlknecht (ITA)	

== Women's singles ==
Medal	Athlete	Time
Gold	Delia Vaudan (ITA)	
Silver	Helga Pichler (ITA)	
Bronze	Irene Koch (AUT)	

== Men's doubles ==
Medal	Athlete	Time
Gold	Italy (Andreas Jud, Ernst Oberhammer)	
Silver	Italy (Almir Bentemps, Corrado Herin)	
Bronze	Italy (Arnold Luger, Gunther Steinhauser)	

== Medal table ==
Rank	Nation	Gold	Silver	Bronze	Total
1	Italy (ITA)	3	3	2	8
2	Austria (AUT)	0	0	1	1
Totals (2 entries)		3	3	3	9
