= Peter Lechner =

Austrian luger (born 1966)

Medal record

Natural track luge

Representing Austria

World Championships
Silver medal – second place	2003 Železniki	Mixed team
Bronze medal – third place	2001 Stein an der Enns	Men's doubles

European Championships
Silver medal – second place	1999 Szczyrk	Men's doubles

Peter Lechner (born 15 April 1966) is an Austrian luger who competed during the late 1990s and early 2000s. A natural track luger, he won two medals at the FIL World Luge Natural Track Championships with a silver in 2003 (Mixed team) and a bronze in 2001 (Men's doubles)).

Lechner also earned a silver medal in the men's doubles event at the 1999 FIL European Luge Natural Track Championships in Szczyrk, Poland.
