= Josef Niedermair =

Italian luger

Medal record

Natural track luge

European Championships
Gold medal – first place	1971 Vandans	Men's doubles

Josef Niedermair was an Italian luger who competed in the early 1970s. A natural track luger, he won a gold medal in the men's doubles event at the 1971 FIL European Luge Natural Track Championships in Vandans, Austria. In 1970, he also won a bronze medal in the men's singles event at the 4th European Cup in Inzing, Austria.
