= FIL European Luge Natural Track Championships 1974 =

The FIL European Luge Natural Track Championships 1974 took place in Niedernsill, Austria.

== Men's singles ==
Medal	Athlete	Time
Gold	Erich Graber (ITA)	
Silver	Erwin Eichelberger (AUT)	
Bronze	Albert Eichelberger (AUT)	

Graber becomes the first non-Austrian to win the men's singles event at the natural track European Championships.

== Women's singles ==
Medal	Athlete	Time
Gold	Klara Niedertscheider (AUT)	
Silver	Elfriede Pirkmann (AUT)	
Bronze	Annemarie Ebner (AUT)	

== Men's doubles ==
Medal	Athlete	Time
Gold	Austria (Siegfried Wild, Othmar Hofer)	
Silver	Italy (R. Jud, Erich Graber)	
Bronze	Austria (Helmut Kleinhofer, Karl Flacher)	

== Medal table ==
Rank	Nation	Gold	Silver	Bronze	Total
1	Austria (AUT)	2	2	3	7
2	Italy (ITA)	1	1	0	2
Totals (2 entries)		3	3	3	9
