= Elvira Holzknecht =

Austrian luger (born 1973)

Medal record

Natural track luge

World Championships
Silver medal – second place	1992 Bad Goisern	Women's singles
Silver medal – second place	1996 Oberperfuss	Women's singles
Bronze medal – third place	2000 Olang-Valadora	Women's singles

European Championships
Silver medal – second place	1997 Passiria	Women's singles
Silver medal – second place	1999 Szczyrk	Women's singles
Bronze medal – third place	1993 Stein an der Enns	Women's singles
Bronze medal – third place	1995 Kandalaksha	Women's singles

Elvira Holzknecht (born 27 September 1973) was an Austrian luger who competed during the 1990s and early 2000s. A natural track luger, she won three medals in the women's singles event at the FIL World Luge Natural Track Championships with two silvers (1992, 1996) and a bronze (2000).

Holzknecht also won four medals at the FIL European Luge Natural Track Championships with two silvers (1997, 1999) and two bronzes (1993, 1995).
