= Albert Eichelberger =

Austrian luger

Medal record

Natural track luge

European Championships
Bronze medal – third place	1974 Niedernsill	Men's singles

Albert Eichelberger was an Austrian luger who competed in the 1970s. A natural track luger, he won the bronze medal in the men's singles event at the 1974 FIL European Luge Natural Track Championships.
