= Luger =

Luger may refer to:

- Luger pistol, a semi-automatic handgun
- Luger (1982 film), a Dutch film written and directed by Theo van Gogh
- Luger (2025 film), a Spanish independent action thriller film
- Operation Luger, a joint military operation between the Canadian Forces and Afghan National Army in July 2007
- A participant in the sport of luge

== People ==
- Arnold Luger, Italian luger
- Dan Luger (born 1975), English rugby union player
- Florian Luger (born 1994), Austrian model
- Georg Luger (1849–1923), Austrian firearm designer, developer of the Luger pistol
- Karolin Luger, Austrian-American biochemist and biophysicist
- Lex Luger (born 1958), American professional wrestler and football player
- Lex Luger (music producer) (born 1991), American hip hop record producer
- Meg Luger-Nikolai, American politician
- Peter Luger (1866–1941), German-American chef and restaurateur

== See also ==
- Lugar (disambiguation)
- Lugger
