= Armin Mair =

Italian luger (born 1977)

Medal record

Natural track luge

Representing Italy

World Championships
Gold medal – first place	2000 Olang-Valadora	Men's doubles
Gold medal – first place	2003 Železniki	Mixed team
Silver medal – second place	2001 Stein an der Enns	Men's doubles
Silver medal – second place	2005 Latsch	Men's doubles
Bronze medal – third place	2005 Latsch	Mixed team

European Championships
Bronze medal – third place	1999 Szczyrk	Men's doubles

Armin Mair (born 5 August 1977) is an Italian luger who competed from 1997 to 2005. A natural track luger, he won five medals at the FIL World Luge Natural Track Championships, including two golds (Men's doubles: 2000, Mixed team: 2003), two silvers (Men's doubles: 2001, 2005), and one bronze (2005).

Mair also earned a bronze medal in the men's doubles event at the 1999 FIL European Luge Natural Track Championships in Szczyrk, Poland.
