= Gottfried Kreuzer =

Austrian luger of the 1970s

Medal record

Natural track luge

European Championships
Silver medal – second place	1975 Feld am See	Men's doubles

Gottfried Kreuzer was an Austrian luger who competed in the mid-1970s. A natural track luger, he won the bronze medal in the men's doubles event at the 1975 FIL European Luge Natural Track Championships in Feld am See, Austria.
