= FIL European Luge Natural Track Championships 1995 =

The FIL European Luge Natural Track Championships 1995 took place in Kandalaksha, Russia.

== Men's singles ==
Medal	Athlete	Time
Gold	Manfred Graber (ITA)	
Silver	Martin Gruber (ITA)	
Bronze	Robert Tomelitsch (AUT)	

== Women's singles ==
Medal	Athlete	Time
Gold	Irene Zechner (AUT)	
Silver	Lyubov Panyutina (RUS)	
Bronze	Elvira Holzknecht (AUT)	

Panyutina becomes the first non-Austrian or Italian to medal in this event at the championships and the first Russian to do so as well.

== Men's doubles ==
Medal	Athlete	Time
Gold	Austria (Andi Ruetz, Helmut Ruetz)	
Silver	Italy (Martin Psenner, Arthur König)	
Bronze	Italy (Jurgen Pezzi, Christian Hafner)	

== Medal table ==
Rank	Nation	Gold	Silver	Bronze	Total
1	Austria (AUT)	2	0	2	4
2	Italy (ITA)	1	2	1	4
3	Russia (RUS)	0	1	0	1
Totals (3 entries)		3	3	3	9
