= Reinhard Gruber =

Italian luger (born 1977)

Medal record

Natural track luge

Representing Italy

World Championships
Gold medal – first place	1998 Rautavaara	Men's singles

European Championships
Gold medal – first place	1997 Moos in Passeier	Men's singles

Reinhard Gruber (born 23 June 1977) is a former Italian luger who has competed since the late 1990s. A natural track luger, he won the men's singles gold medal at the 1998 FIL World Luge Natural Track Championships in Rautavaara, Finland.

Gruber won a gold medal in the same event at the 1997 FIL European Luge Natural Track Championships in Moos in Passeier, Italy.
