= Hannelore Plattner =

Austrian luger

Medal record

Natural track luge

European Championships
Gold medal – first place	1970 Kapfenberg	Women's singles

Hannelore Plattner is an Austrian luger who competed in the early 1970s. A natural track luger, she won the gold medal in the women's singles event at the 1970 FIL European Luge Natural Track Championships in Kapfenberg, Austria.
