= Werner Prantl =

Austrian luger

Medal record

Natural track luge

World Championships
| Gold medal – first place | 1979 Inzing | Men's singles |
| Bronze medal – third place | 1979 Inzing | Men's doubles |
| Bronze medal – third place | 1982 Feld am See | Men's singles |
| Bronze medal – third place | 1982 Feld am See | Men's doubles |

European Championships
| Gold medal – first place | 1979 Aosta | Men's doubles |
| Silver medal – second place | 1978 Aurach | Men's singles |

Werner Prantl was an Austrian luger who competed in the late 1970s and early 1980s. A natural track luger, he won one gold (Singles: 1979) and three bronzes (Singles: 1982, Doubles: 1979, 1982) at the FIL World Luge Natural Track Championships.

Prantl also won two medals at the FIL European Luge Natural Track Championships with a gold in doubles (1979) and a silver singles (1978).
