= FIL European Luge Natural Track Championships 1985 =

The FIL European Luge Natural Track Championships 1985 took place in Szczyrk, Poland. This was the first time the championships did not take place either in Austria or in Italy.

== Men's singles ==
Medal	Athlete	Time
Gold	Manfred Danklmaier (AUT)	
Silver	Damiano Lugon (ITA)	
Bronze	Robert Tomelitsch (AUT)	

== Women's singles ==
Medal	Athlete	Time
Gold	Delia Vaudan (ITA)	
Silver	Irmgard Lanthaler (ITA)	
Bronze	Herta Hafner (ITA)	

== Men's doubles ==
Medal	Athlete	Time
Gold	Italy (Raimund Pigneter, Georg Antholzer)	
Silver	Italy (Almir Bentemps, Corrado Herin)	
Bronze	Italy (Andreas Jud, Ernst Oberhammer)	

== Medal table ==
Rank	Nation	Gold	Silver	Bronze	Total
1	Italy (ITA)	2	3	2	7
2	Austria (AUT)	1	0	1	2
Totals (2 entries)		3	3	3	9
