= Sandra Lanthaler =

Italian luger (born 1984)

Medal record

Natural track luge

Representing Italy

European Championships
Gold medal – first place	2002 Frantschach	Women's singles

Sandra Lanthaler (born 1 February 1984) is an Italian luger who has competed since the late 1990s. A natural track luger, she won the gold medal in the women's singles event at the 2002 FIL European Luge Natural Track Championships in Frantschach, Austria.
