= FIL European Luge Natural Track Championships 1993 =

The FIL European Luge Natural Track Championships 1993 took place in Stein an der Enns, Austria.

== Men's singles ==
Medal	Athlete	Time
Gold	Anton Blasbichler (ITA)	
Silver	Willi Danklmaier (AUT)	
Bronze	Franz Obrist (ITA)	

== Women's singles ==
Medal	Athlete	Time
Gold	Irene Zechner (AUT)	
Silver	Doris Haselrieder (ITA)	
Bronze	Elvira Holzknecht (AUT)	

== Men's doubles ==
Medal	Athlete	Time
Gold	Italy (Almir Bentemps, Corrado Herin)	
Silver	Italy (Jurgen Pezzi, Christian Hafner)	
Bronze	Austria (Reinhold Bachmann, Manfred Als)	

== Medal table ==
Rank	Nation	Gold	Silver	Bronze	Total
1	Italy (ITA)	2	2	1	5
2	Austria (AUT)	1	1	2	4
Totals (2 entries)		3	3	3	9
