= Florian Prantl =

Austrian luger

Medal record

Natural track luge

World Championships
Bronze medal – third place	1979 Inzing	Men's doubles
Bronze medal – third place	1982 Feld am See	Men's doubles

European Championships
Gold medal – first place	1979 Aosta	Men's doubles

Florian Prantl was an Austrian luger who competed in the late 1970s and early 1980s. A natural track luger, he won two bronze medals in the men's doubles event at the FIL World Luge Natural Track Championships (1979, 1982).

Prantl also won a gold medal in the men's double event at the 1979 FIL European Luge Natural Track Championships in Aosta, Italy.
