= Josef Lexer =

Austrian luger

Medal record

Natural track luge

European Championships
Gold medal – first place	1970 Kapfenberg	Men's doubles

Josef Lexer is a former Austrian luger who competed in the early 1970s. A natural track luger, he won the gold medal in the men's doubles event at the 1970 FIL European Luge Natural Track Championships in Kapfenberg, Austria.
