= Aurach bei Kitzbühel =

- Municipality
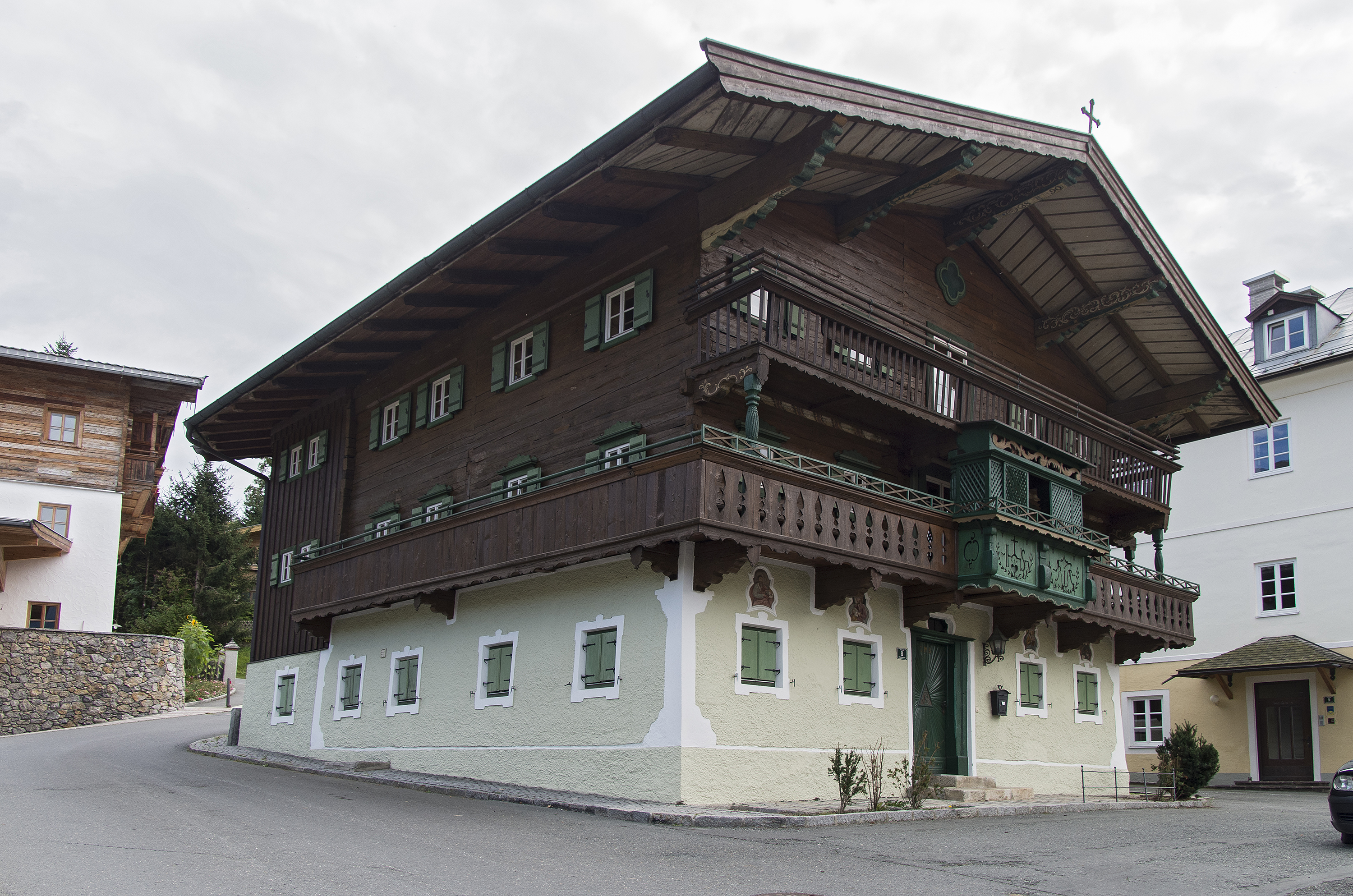
- Krämerhaus (Chandler House)

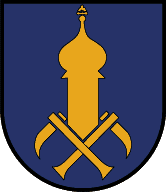
- Coat of arms

- Location within Austria
- Coordinates: 47°25′00″N 12°26′00″E
- Country: Austria
- State: Tyrol
- District: Kitzbühel

Government
  - Mayor: Andreas Koidl

Area
  - Total: 54.24 km^{2} (20.94 sq mi)
- Elevation: 846 m (2,776 ft)

Population (2021)
  - Total: 1,132
  - Density: 20.87/km^{2} (54.05/sq mi)
- Time zone: UTC+1 (CET)
  - Summer (DST): UTC+2 (CEST)
- Postal code: 6370
- Area code: 05356
- Vehicle registration: KB
- Website: www.aurach.tirol.gv.at

Aurach bei Kitzbühel (Bavarian: Aurach bei Kitzbichi) is a municipality in Kitzbühel District in the Kitzbühel Alps in the Austrian state of Tyrol.

Aurach is located 5 km south of district town of Kitzbühel on the river known as the Kitzbühler Ache and the road to Thurn Pass. The municipality is further divided into Unteraurach, Oberaurach and several scattered settlements and hamlets including Haberberg, Haselwand, Kochau, Sonnberg and Wiesenegg-Grüntal. It was mentioned for the first time in documents in 1289 s Orwiorwe. Formerly a part of Kitzbühel district, Aurach became an independent municipality in 1833. It has 1171 inhabitants (as at 1 Jan 2010).

Of historical significance is the former mine in the area of the Kelchalm.

Aurach has a wildlife park, situated at a height of 1,100 metres, which is home to typical Alpine animals such as red deer, ibex, mouflon, wild boar and lynx, as well as animals from other mountainous regions, including fallow deer, sika deer, llama and yak.

== Neighbouring municipalities ==
Fieberbrunn, Jochberg, Kitzbühel

in the state of Salzburg: Saalbach-Hinterglemm

== Population ==
Historical population
Year	Pop.	±%
1869	781	—
1880	771	−1.3%
1890	715	−7.3%
1900	740	+3.5%
1910	782	+5.7%
1923	822	+5.1%
1934	853	+3.8%
1939	738	−13.5%
1951	824	+11.7%
1961	828	+0.5%
1971	930	+12.3%
1981	1,024	+10.1%
1991	1,050	+2.5%
2001	1,203	+14.6%
2011	1,150	−4.4%
