= Sankt Konrad =

St. Konrad
- Municipality
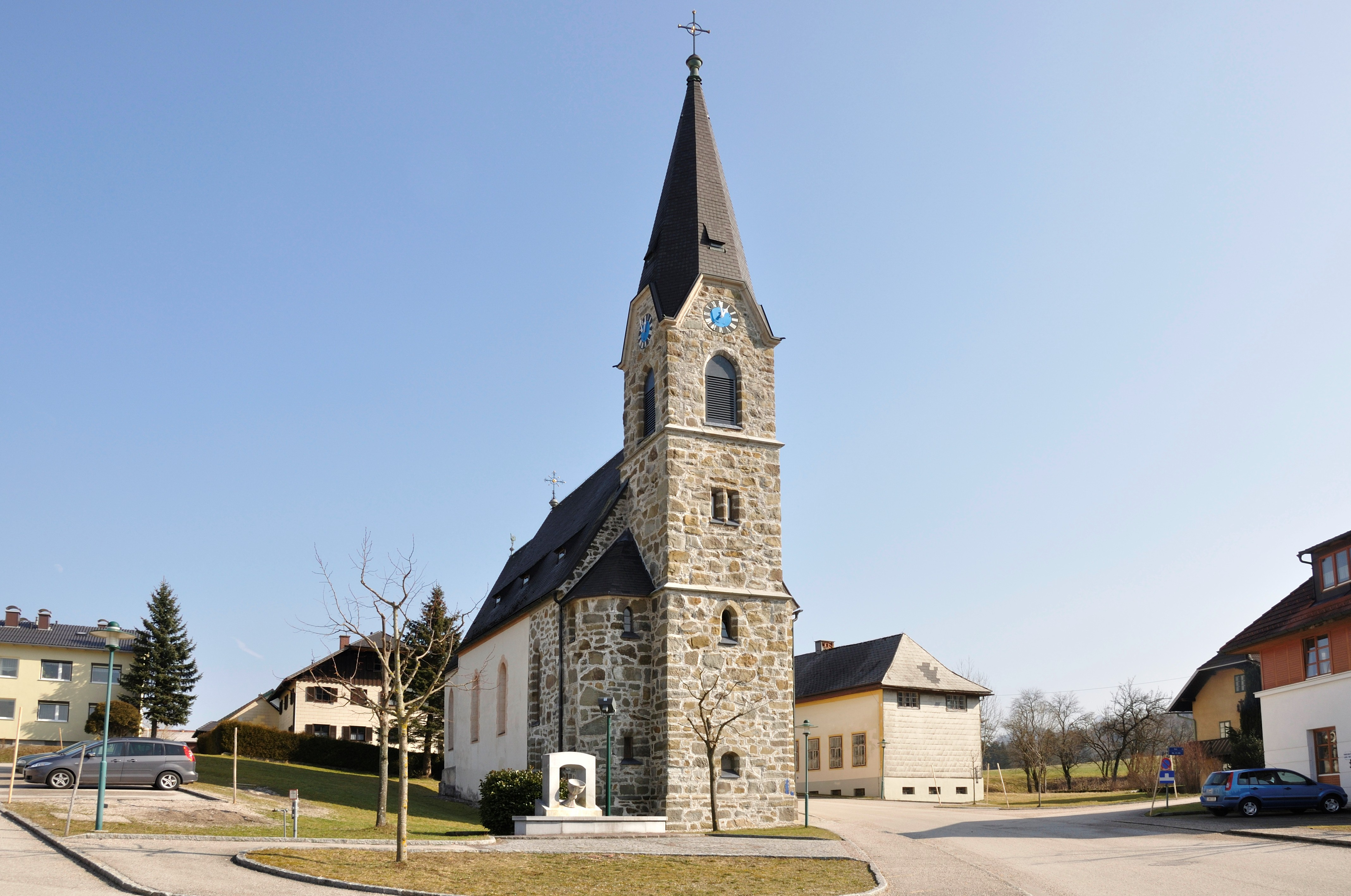
- Church of Saint Konrad

- Coat of arms

- Location within Austria
- Coordinates: 47°54′49″N 13°53′02″E
- Country: Austria
- State: Upper Austria
- District: Gmunden

Government
  - Mayor: Herbert Schönberger (ÖVP)

Area
  - Total: 19.27 km^{2} (7.44 sq mi)
- Elevation: 584 m (1,916 ft)

Population (2018-01-01)
  - Total: 1,115
  - Density: 57.86/km^{2} (149.9/sq mi)
- Time zone: UTC+1 (CET)
  - Summer (DST): UTC+2 (CEST)
- Postal code: 4817
- Area code: 07615
- Vehicle registration: GM
- Website: https://www.st-konrad.at/

St. Konrad (or Sankt Konrad) is a town in the Gmunden district in the Austrian state of Upper Austria in Austria.

== Geography ==
Sankt Konrad is part of the Salzkammergut resort area in Austria. It lies between the Traunsee and the Alm valley. About 51 percent of the municipality is forest, and 44 percent is farmland.
