= Seis am Schlern =

Alpine village in South Tyrol, Italy

Coordinates: 46°32′39″N 11°33′44″E

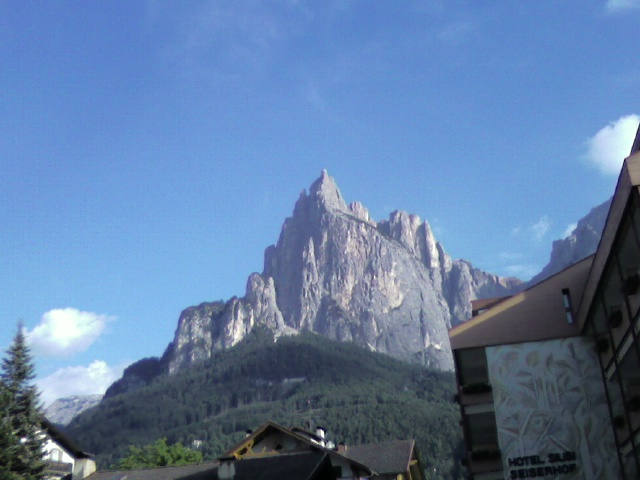
The Santner

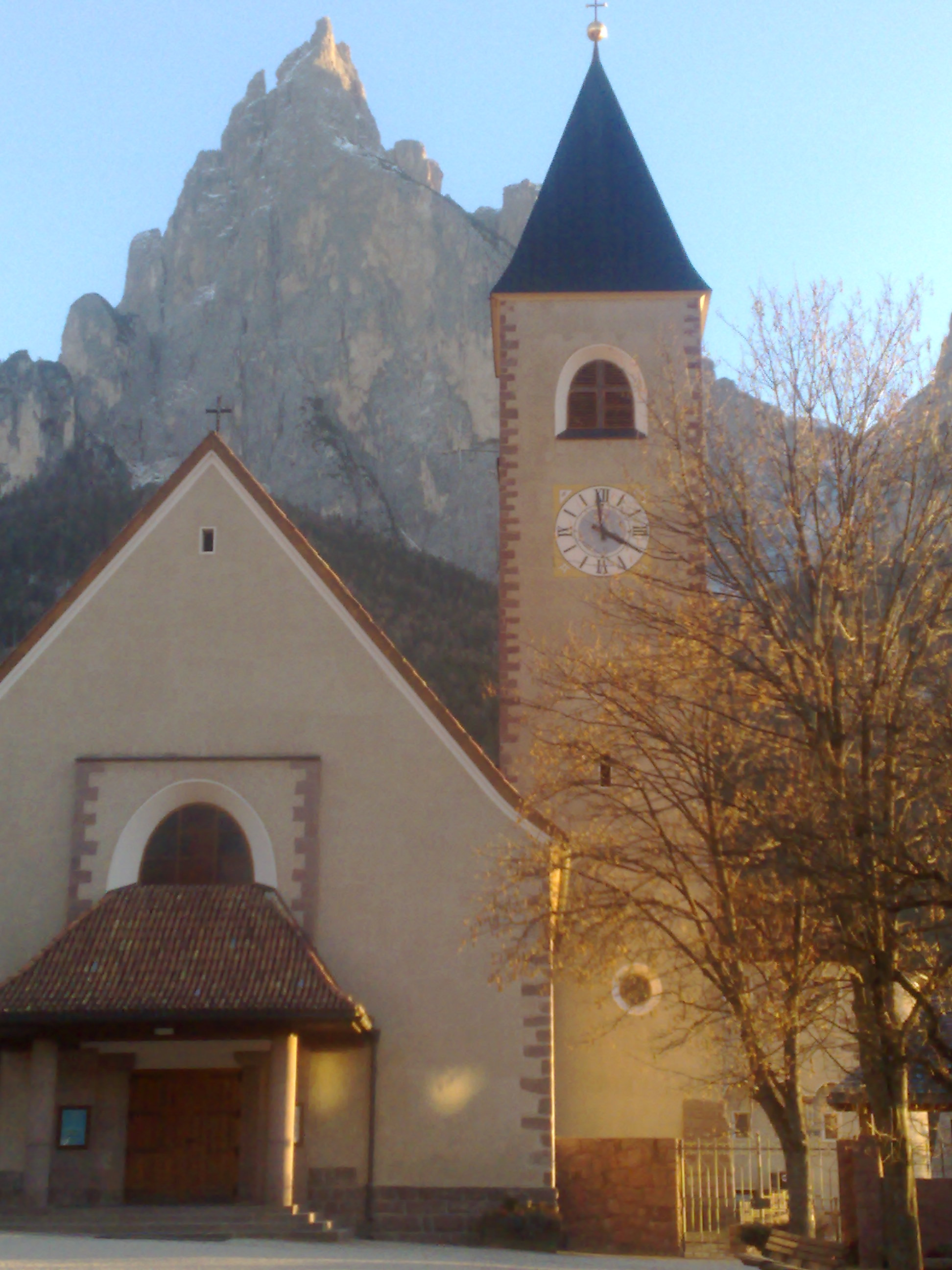
The main church

Seis am Schlern (Austrian German: [ˈsaɪs am ˈʃlɛrn]; Italian: Siusi allo Sciliar [ˈsjuːzi allo ʃʃiˈljar]) is an Alpine village in South Tyrol, in the Trentino-Alto Adige/Südtirol region of northern Italy. It is a frazione (borough) of the comune (municipality) of Kastelruth.

== Geography ==
The village lies in the Dolomites, in the shadow of the 2,563m high Schlern. The summit can be reached by following trail number one from the village.

== History ==
The peak at the north west end of the mountain was first climbed in 1888 by Johann Santner. It is named the Santner Spitze in his honour.

== Economy ==
The village is dependent on tourism, in Summer and Winter.

== Famous residents ==
The poet, composer and diplomat Oswald von Wolkenstein lived for a time in Seis. The German philosopher Wilhelm Dilthey died in the village on 1 October 1911.

The Russian scientist, historian and ethnologist Count Aleksey Alekseyevich Bobrinsky died in the Village on 4 December 1938.
