= Niedernsill =

Niedernsill Niedansü
- Municipality
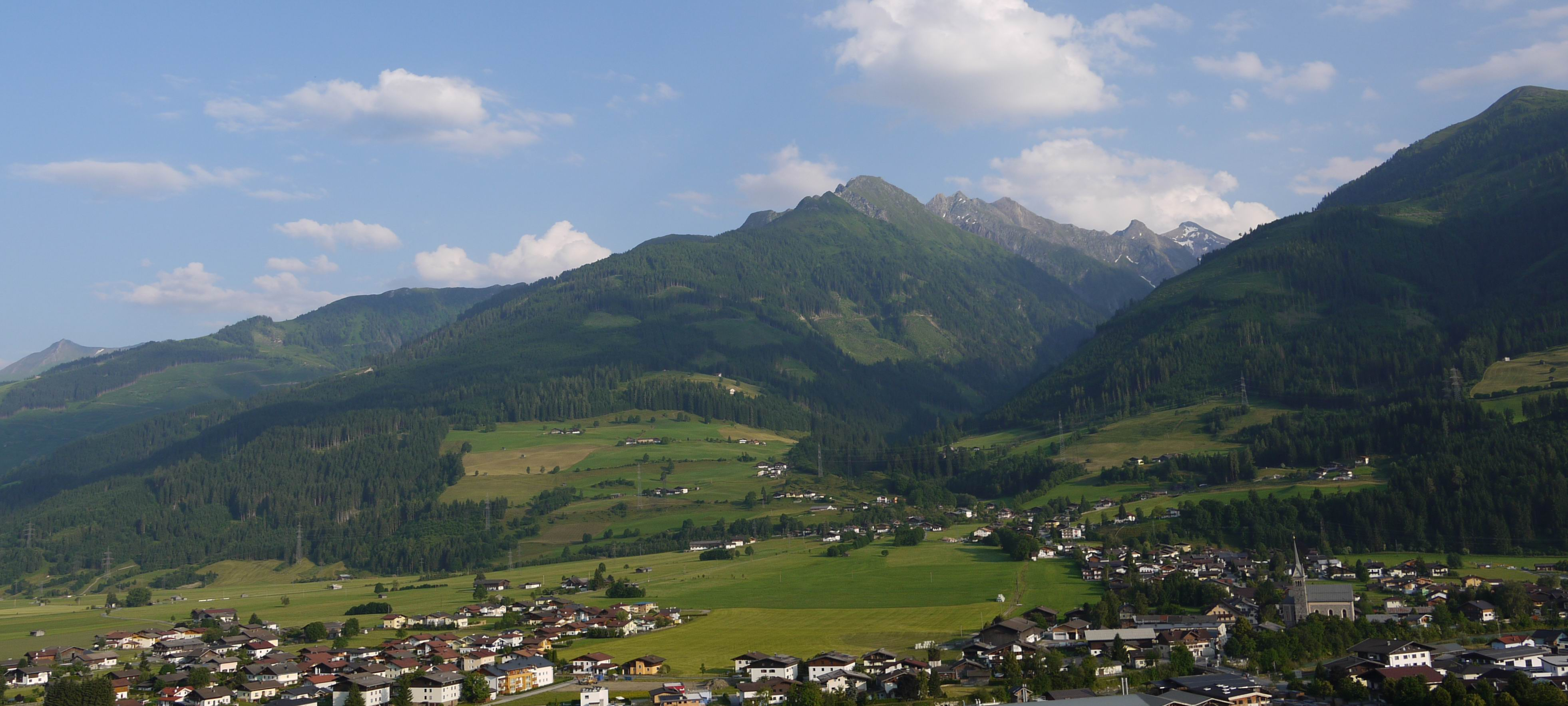
- View of Niedernsill

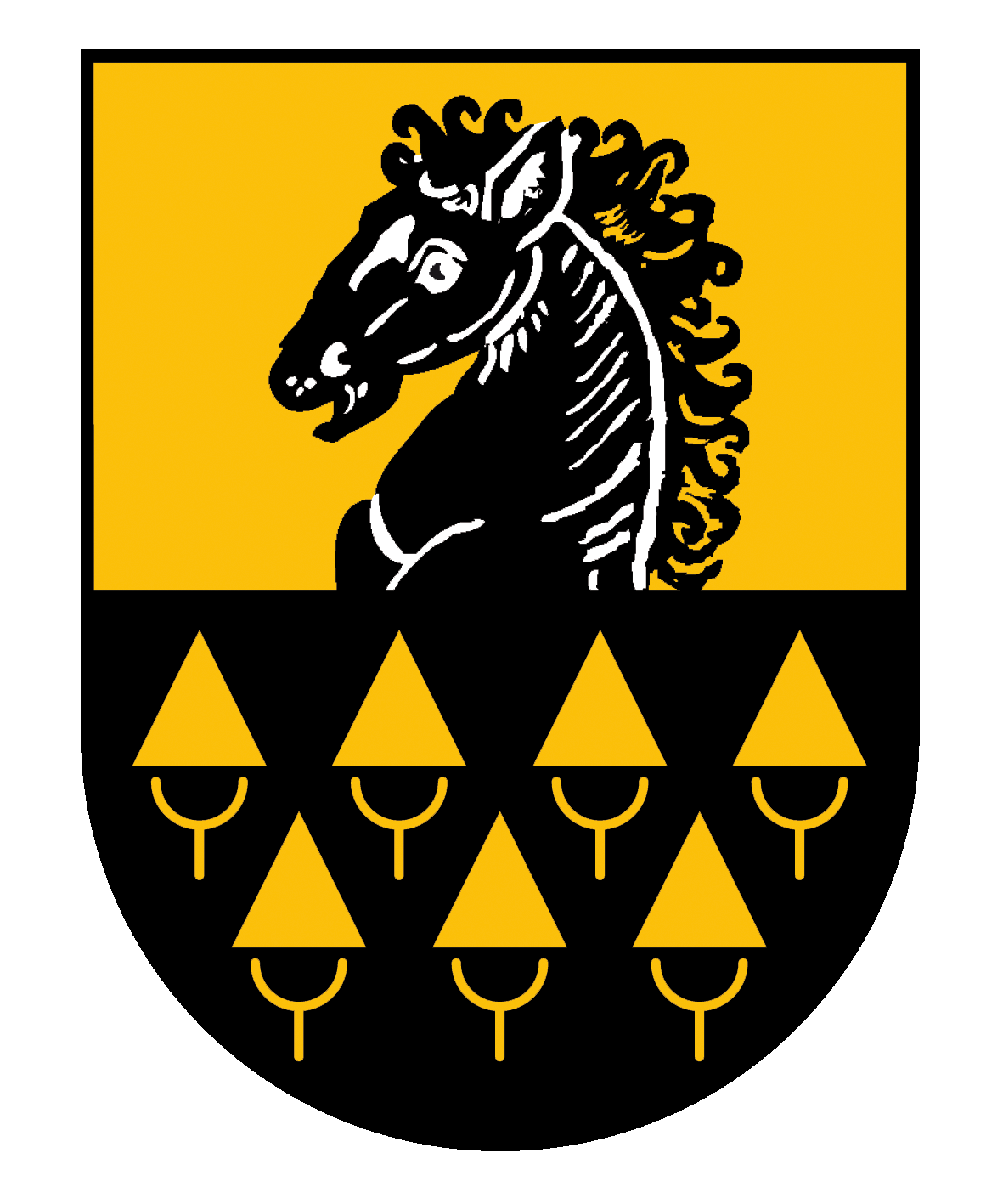
- Coat of arms

- Location within Austria
- Coordinates: 47°17′00″N 12°39′00″E
- Country: Austria
- State: Salzburg
- District: Zell am See

Government
  - Mayor: Günther Brennsteiner (ÖVP)

Area
  - Total: 56.54 km^{2} (21.83 sq mi)
- Elevation: 768 m (2,520 ft)

Population (2018-01-01)
  - Total: 2,694
  - Density: 47.65/km^{2} (123.4/sq mi)
- Time zone: UTC+1 (CET)
  - Summer (DST): UTC+2 (CEST)
- Postal code: 5722
- Area code: 06548
- Vehicle registration: ZE
- Website: www.niedernsill.at

Niedernsill (Austrian German: Niedansü) is a town located in the Zell am See district in the state of Salzburg in Austria. It is best known for its winter sports of skiing and its summer activities of hiking.

== Population ==
Historical population
Year	Pop.	±%
1869	923	—
1880	869	−5.9%
1890	877	+0.9%
1900	990	+12.9%
1910	1,016	+2.6%
1923	972	−4.3%
1934	1,157	+19.0%
1939	1,282	+10.8%
1951	1,365	+6.5%
1961	1,425	+4.4%
1971	1,654	+16.1%
1981	1,942	+17.4%
1991	2,085	+7.4%
2001	2,413	+15.7%
2011	2,497	+3.5%
