= 2022 in sports =

2022 in sports describes the year's events in world sports. The main events for this year were the 2022 Winter Olympic Games in Beijing, the 2022 Commonwealth Games in Birmingham, the UEFA Women's Euro 2022 in England and the 2022 FIFA World Cup in Qatar.

== Multi-sport events ==
- January 22–28: 2022 Special Olympics World Winter Games in Kazan, Russia Cancelled
- February 4–20: 2022 Winter Olympics, in Beijing, China
- March 4–13: 2022 Winter Paralympics, in Beijing, China
- April 16–22: 2020 Invictus Games, in The Hague, Netherlands
- April 22 – May 8: 2022 Central American and Caribbean Games, in San Salvador, El Salvador (Postponed to 2023)
- May 12–23: 2021 Southeast Asian Games in Hanoi, Vietnam
- May 13–29: 2021 World Masters Games in Kansai, Japan
- May 16–31: GCC Games – Kuwait
- June 25 – July 5: 2022 Mediterranean Games in Oran, Algeria
- July 7–17: 2022 World Games in Birmingham, United States
- July 28 – August 8: 2022 Commonwealth Games, in Birmingham, England
- October 1–15: 2022 South American Games, in Asunción, Paraguay
- April 28 – May 8: 2022 South American Youth Games in Rosario, Argentina
- December 20–28: 2021 Asian Youth Games in Shantou, China Cancelled
- July 24–30: 2022 European Youth Summer Olympic Festival in Banská Bystrica, Slovakia
- 2022 Children Games of Asia – Russia
- 2022 West Asian Para Games – Bahrain
- 2022 FISU Combat Games – Russia
- 2022 World Combat Games – Kazakhstan Cancelled
- 2022 World Masters Games – Japan Cancelled
- 2022 World Police and Fire Games – Netherlands
- 2022 World Firefighters Games – Portugal
- 2022 Winter Military World Games – Germany Cancelled
- 2022 Cadets Military World Games – Russia Cancelled
- 2022 World Nomad Games – Turkey
- 2022 ISF World Schools Games – France
- 2022 ASEAN University Games – Thailand 26 July–6 August 2022
- 2022 INAS European Games
- 2022 INAS Asian Games
- 2022 INAS African Games
- 2022 INAS American Games
- 2022 MED Senior Games
- 2022 World Medi Games
- 2022 European Open Trisome Games
- 2022 International Children's Games
- 2022 IWAS World Games – Portugal
- European Heart and Lung Transplant Championships 2022 / 6–11 June 2022 / Belgium
- European Transplant and Dialysis Sports Games 2022 / 21–28 August 2022 / Oxford, UK
- Transplant Games of America / 29 July – 3 August 2022 / USA (San Diego)
- 2022 Invictus Games
- 2022 Arab University Games
- 2022 International Youth Games
- 2022 ASEAN Para Games
- 2022 World Aquatics Championships
- 2022 FIA Motorsport Games
- 2022 Maccabiah Games
- 2022 Mediterranean Games
- 2022 Sukma Games
- 2022 South American Games
- 2022 European Company Sports Games of Summer
- 2022 European Company Sports Games of Winter
- 2022 European Martial Arts Games
- 2022 European Para Youth Games
- 2022 European Police and Fire Games
- 2022 European Youth Olympic Festival
- 2022 World Transplant Games (Winter) Cancelled
- 2022 FICEP-FISEC Games
- 2022 FISU America Games
- 2022 Gratitude Games
- 2022 World Air Games
- 2022 world wind Games
- 2022 Senior Olympics
- 2022 Huntsman World Senior Games
- 2022 Défi sportif
- 2022 World Roller Games
- 2022 World Martial Arts Games
- 2022 International Army Games
- 2022 Special Olympics European Games
- 2022 Special Olympics MENA Games
- 2022 European Universities Games
- 2022 Americas Masters Games – Rio de Janeiro Brazil TBD
- 2022 African Youth Games – Egypt
- 2022 U18 World School Summer Games – 14–22 May France

== Air sports ==
- April 6 – 9, 2022: 2022 World Cup of Indoor Skydiving in (Belgium) Charleroi
- April 20 – 30: 2022 FAI World Paramotor Championships in (Brazil) Saquarema
  - PF1 Subclass: (gold) (Italy) Pasquale Biondo, (silver) (France) Cyril Planton, (bronze) (France) Jean-Emile Oulha
  - PL1 Subclass: (gold) (France) Boris Tysebaert, (silver) (France) Michael Merle, (bronze) (Brazil) Marcelo Martins
  - PL2 Subclass: (gold) (France) Fabrice Breuzard, (silver) (France) Stephane Clavurier, (bronze) (Brazil) Valcir Aires
- June 4 – 11: 2022 FAI World Intermediate Aerobatic Championship in (Poland) Toruń
  - (gold) (Poland) Maciej Kulaszewski, (silver) (Romania) Petre-Florin Glontaru, (bronze) (Hungary) Balázs Kiss
- June 20 – 30: 2022 CISM World Military Parachuting Championship in (Austria) Güssing
- July 2 – 16: 2022 FAI World 13,5 m Class Gliding Championship in (Lithuania) Pociūnai
  - (gold) (Netherlands) Nick Hanenburg, (silver) (Lithuania) Darius Gudžiūnas, (bronze) (Lithuania) Linas Miežlaiškis
- July 8 – 14: 2022 FAI F3DE World Championships for Pylon Racing Model Aircraft in (United States) Muncie
  - F3D Class: (gold) (Sweden) Emil Broberg, (silver) (United States) Gino Del Ponte, (bronze) (Sweden) Gunnar Broberg
  - F3E Class: (gold) (Czech Republic) Tomáš Ciniburk, (silver) (Czech Republic) Jan Sedláček, (bronze) (Australia) Tyler Mees
- July 18 – 23: 2022 FAI World Freefall Style and Accuracy Landing Championships in (Czech Republic) Strakonice
- July 23 – 30: 2022 FAI F4 World Championships for Scale Model Aircraft in (Norway) Tønsberg
- July 23 – 30: 2022 FAI World Microlight Championships in (Czech Republic) Hosín
- July 23 – August 6: 2022 FAI World Gliding Championships in (Hungary) Matkópuszta
- August 4 – 13: 2022 FAI World Aerobatic Championships in (Poland) Leszno
- August 13 – 27: 2022 FAI Women's World Gliding Championships in (United Kingdom) Husbands Bosworth
- August 17 – 27: 2022 FAI World Glider Aerobatic Championships and 2022 FAI World Advanced Glider Aerobatic Championships in (France) Issoudun
- August 20 – 27: 2022 FAI F3J World Championship for Model Gliders in (Slovakia) Tekovský Hrádok
- August 20 – 27: 2022 FAI World Precision Flight Championship in (France) Albi
- September 10 – 17: 2022 FAI World Paramotor Slalom Championships in (Czech Republic) Strachotín
- October 2 – 8: 2022 FAI F3F World Championship for Model Gliders in (Denmark) Hanstholm
- October 9 – 14: 2022 FAI World Canopy Piloting Championships and 2022 FAI World Canopy Piloting Freestyle Championships in (United States) Eloy
- October 20 – 26: 2022 FAI World Formation Skydiving Championships, 2022 FAI World Canopy Formation Championships, 2022 FAI World Artistic Events Championships, 2022 FAI World Speed Skydiving Championships and 2022 FAI World Wingsuit Flight Championships in (United States) Eloy
- November 13 – 19: 2022 FAI World Rally Flying Championship in (South Africa) Brits

== American football ==
=== 2022 IFAF Women's World Championship ===
- July 28 – August 8: in Finland

=== National Football League ===
- February 6: 2022 Pro Bowl in (Nevada) Allegiant Stadium
  - American Football Conference defeated National Football Conference, 41–35.
- February 13: Super Bowl LVI in (California) SoFi Stadium
  - (California) Los Angeles Rams defeated (Ohio) Cincinnati Bengals, 23–20, to win their second Super Bowl.
- April 28 – 30: 2022 NFL draft in (Nevada) Las Vegas
- September 8 – January 8, 2023: 2022 NFL season

=== United States Football League ===
- April 16 – June 25: 2022 USFL season
  - July 3: 2022 USFL Championship Game in (Ohio) Canton – Birmingham Stallions defeated Philadelphia Stars, 33–30.

=== Indoor American football ===
- March 12 – July 30: 2022 IFL season
  - August 13: IFL National Championship in (Nevada) Henderson – Northern Arizona Wranglers defeated the Quad City Steamwheelers, 47–45
- March 12 – June 18: 2022 CIF season
  - June 25: Champions Bowl VII in (Kansas) Salina – Salina Liberty defeated the Omaha Beef, 38–34
- April 23 – July 30: 2022 NAL season
  - August 13: NAL Championship in (New York (state)) Albany – Albany Empire defeated the Carolina Cobras, 47–20

=== College Football Playoff and National Championship Game ===
- December 31, 2021: Cotton Bowl Classic in (Texas) Arlington (Playoff Semifinal Game)
  - Alabama Crimson Tide def. (Ohio) Cincinnati Bearcats, 27–6.
- December 31, 2021: Orange Bowl in (Florida) Miami Gardens(Playoff Semifinal Game)
  - (Georgia (U.S. state)) Georgia Bulldogs def. Michigan Wolverines, 34–11.
- January 10: College Football Playoff National Championship in (Indiana) Indianapolis (Cotton Bowl Winner vs. Orange Bowl Winner)
  - (Georgia (U.S. state)) Georgia Bulldogs def. Alabama Crimson Tide, 33–18

=== 2021–22 NCAA football bowl games ===
- December 17, 2021: Bahamas Bowl in (The Bahamas) Nassau
  - Middle Tennessee Blue Raiders def. (Ohio) Toledo Rockets, 31–24.
- December 17, 2021: Cure Bowl in (Florida) Orlando
  - (South Carolina) Coastal Carolina Chanticleers def. Northern Illinois Huskies, 47–41.
- December 18, 2021: Boca Raton Bowl in (Florida) Boca Raton
  - Western Kentucky Hilltoppers def. (North Carolina) Appalachian State Mountaineers, 59–38.
- December 18, 2021: New Mexico Bowl in Albuquerque
  - (California) Fresno State Bulldogs def. (Texas) UTEP Miners, 31–24.
- December 18, 2021: Independence Bowl in (Louisiana) Shreveport
  - (Alabama) UAB Blazers def. (Utah) BYU Cougars, 31–28.
- December 18, 2021: LendingTree Bowl in Alabama
  - (Virginia) Liberty Flames def. Eastern Michigan Eagles, 56–20.
- December 18, 2021: LA Bowl in (California) Inglewood
  - Utah State Aggies def. Oregon State Beavers, 24–13.
- December 18, 2021: New Orleans Bowl in New Orleans
  - Louisiana Ragin' Cajuns def. (West Virginia) Marshall Thundering Herd, 36–21.
- December 20, 2021: Myrtle Beach Bowl in (South Carolina) Conway
  - (Oklahoma) Tulsa Golden Hurricane def. (Virginia) Old Dominion Monarchs, 30–17.
- December 21, 2021: Famous Idaho Potato Bowl in Boise
  - Wyoming Cowboys def. (Ohio) Kent State Golden Flashes, 52–38.
- December 21, 2021: Frisco Bowl in (Texas) Frisco
  - (California) San Diego State Aztecs def. (Texas) UTSA Roadrunners, 38–24.
- December 22, 2021: Armed Forces Bowl in (Texas) Fort Worth
  - (New York (state)) Army Black Knights def. Missouri Tigers, 24–22.
- December 23, 2021: Frisco Football Classic in Frisco
  - (Ohio) Miami RedHawks def. North Texas Mean Green, 27–14.
- December 23, 2021: Gasparilla Bowl in Tampa
  - UCF Knights def. Florida Gators, 29–17.
- December 24, 2021: Hawaii Bowl in Honolulu
  - Canceled
- December 25, 2021: Camellia Bowl in (Alabama) Montgomery
  - (Georgia (U.S. state)) Georgia State Panthers def. (Indiana) Ball State Cardinals, 51–20.
- December 27, 2021: Quick Lane Bowl in Detroit
  - Western Michigan Broncos def. Nevada Wolf Pack, 52–24.
- December 27, 2021: Military Bowl in (Maryland) Annapolis
  - Canceled
- December 28, 2021: Birmingham Bowl in (Alabama) Birmingham
  - (Texas) Houston Cougars def. (Alabama) Auburn Tigers, 17–13.
- December 28, 2021: First Responder Bowl in (Texas) University Park
  - (Colorado) Air Force Falcons def. (Kentucky) Louisville Cardinals, 31–28.
- December 28, 2021: Liberty Bowl in (Tennessee) Memphis
  - Texas Tech Red Raiders def. Mississippi State Bulldogs, 34–7.
- December 28, 2021: Holiday Bowl in (California) San Diego
  - Canceled
- December 28, 2021: Guaranteed Rate Bowl in (Arizona) Phoenix
  - Minnesota Golden Gophers def. West Virginia Mountaineers, 18–6.
- December 29, 2021: Fenway Bowl in (Massachusetts) Boston
  - Canceled
- December 29, 2021: Pinstripe Bowl in (New York (state)) The Bronx
  - Maryland Terrapins def. Virginia Tech Hokies, 54–10.
- December 29, 2021: Cheez-It Bowl in (Florida) Orlando
  - (South Carolina) Clemson Tigers def. Iowa State Cyclones, 20–13.
- December 29, 2021: Alamo Bowl in (Texas) San Antonio
  - Oklahoma Sooners def. Oregon Ducks, 47–32.
- December 30, 2021: Peach Bowl in (Georgia (U.S. state)) Atlanta
  - Michigan State Spartans def. (Pennsylvania) Pittsburgh Panthers, 31–21.
- December 30, 2021: Duke's Mayo Bowl in Charlotte
  - South Carolina Gamecocks def. North Carolina Tar Heels, 38–21.
- December 30, 2021: Music City Bowl in Nashville
  - (Indiana) Purdue Boilermakers def. Tennessee Volunteers, 48–45.
- December 30, 2021: Las Vegas Bowl in (Nevada) Paradise
  - Wisconsin Badgers def. Arizona State Sun Devils, 20–13.
- December 31, 2021: Gator Bowl in (Florida) Jacksonville
  - (North Carolina) Wake Forest Demon Deacons def. (New Jersey) Rutgers Scarlet Knights, 38–10.
- December 31, 2021: Sun Bowl in (Texas) El Paso
  - Central Michigan Chippewas def. (Washington (state)) Washington State Cougars, 24–21.
- December 31, 2021: Arizona Bowl in Tucson
  - Canceled
- January 1: Fiesta Bowl in (Arizona) Glendale
  - Oklahoma State Cowboys def. (Indiana) Notre Dame Fighting Irish, 37–35.
- January 1: Rose Bowl in (California) Pasadena
  - Ohio State Buckeyes def. Utah Utes, 48–45.
- January 1: Sugar Bowl in (Louisiana) New Orleans
  - (Texas) Baylor Bears vs. (Mississippi) Ole Miss Rebels, 21–7.
- January 1: Outback Bowl in (Florida) Tampa
  - Arkansas Razorbacks def. (Pennsylvania) Penn State Nittany Lions, 24–10.
- January 1: Citrus Bowl in (Florida) Orlando
  - Kentucky Wildcats def. Iowa Hawkeyes, 20–17.
- January 4: Texas Bowl in Houston
  - Kansas State Wildcats def. (Louisiana) LSU Tigers, 42–20

== Aquatics ==
=== FINA ===
==== World Championships ====
===== 2022 World Aquatics Championships =====
- June 18 – July 3: in (Hungary) Budapest

===== Youth and Junior Championships =====
- August 10 – 13: 2022 FINA World Youth Artistic Swimming Championships in (United States) Charlotte
- August 23 – 27: 2022 FINA World Junior Artistic Swimming Championships in (Canada) Quebec City
- August 30 – September 4: 2022 FINA World Junior Swimming Championships in (Peru) Lima
- September 1 – 4: 2022 FINA World Junior Open Water Swimming Championships in (Seychelles) Mahé

===== Other discipline championships =====
- December 17 – 22: 2022 FINA World Swimming Championships (25 m) in (Australia) Melbourne
  - Moved from (Russia) Kazan due to Russo-Ukrainian War

==== 2022 FINA Diving World Series ====
- April 8 – 10: 2nd Leg in (Russia) Kazan
  - Cancelled due to Russo-Ukrainian War
- May 13 – 15: 1st Leg in (Canada) Montreal
- TBD: 3rd Leg in (China) Wuhan
- TBD: 4th Leg in (China) Zhuhai

==== 2022 FINA Artistic Swimming World Series ====
- March 19 & 20: 1st Leg in Canada and United States (Virtual event)
  - Women's Solo Technical winner: Varvara Subbotina
  - Women's Solo Free winner: (France) Eve Planeix
  - Women's Duet Technical winners: Varvara Subbotina & Svetlana Kolesnichenko
  - Women's Duet Free winners: (United States) Megumi Field, Natalia Vega & Anita Alvarez (reserve).
  - Women's Team Technical winners: France
  - Women's Team Free winners: Canada
  - Men's Solo Technical winner: Aleksandr Maltsev
  - Men's Solo Free winner: (Puerto Rico) Javier Ruisanchez
  - Mixed Duet Technical winners: Aleksandr Maltsev, Mayya Gurbanberdieva & Olesia Platonova (reserve).
  - Mixed Duet Free winners: Aleksandr Maltsev, Olesia Platonova & Mayya Gurbanberdieva (reserve).
  - Mixed Team Highlight winners: United States
- April 1 – 3: 2nd Leg in (France) Paris
  - Women's Solo Technical winner: (France) Oriane Jaillardon
  - Women's Solo Free winner: (Spain) Iris Tió
  - Women's Duet Technical winners: (France) Oriane Jaillardon, Romane Lunel & Sasha Comte (reserve)
  - Women's Duet Free winners: (United States) Megumi Field, Natalia Vega & Daniella Ramirez (reserve).
  - Women's Team Highlight winners: United States
  - Women's Team Free Combination winners: Israel
  - Women's Team Technical winners: United States
  - Women's Team Free winners: Spain
  - Men's Solo Technical winner: (Spain) Fernando Díaz del Río
  - Men's Solo Free winner: (Colombia) Gustavo Sánchez
  - Mixed Duet Technical winners: (Spain) Emma García & Pau Ribes
  - Mixed Duet Free winners: (Spain) Emma García & Pau Ribes
- April 8 – 10: 3rd Leg in (Russia) Kazan
  - Cancelled due to Russo-Ukrainian War
- May 7 & 8: 4th Leg in Australia (Virtual event)
  - Women's Solo Technical winner: (Austria) Vasiliki Alexandri
  - Women's Solo Free winner: (Canada) Audrey Lamothe
  - Women's Duet Technical winners: (Austria) Anna-Maria Alexandri & Eirini-Marina Alexandri
  - Women's Duet Free winners: (United States) Megumi Field & Natalia Vega
  - Women's Team Technical winners: United States
  - Women's Team Free winners: Canada
  - Men's Solo Technical winner: (Spain) Fernando Díaz del Río
  - Men's Solo Free winner: (Colombia) Gustavo Sánchez
  - Mixed Duet Technical winners: (Japan) Yotaro Sato & Tomoka Sato
  - Mixed Duet Free winners: (Japan) Yotaro Sato & Tomoka Sato
  - Mixed Team Highlight winners: United States
  - Mixed Team Free Combination winners: Israel
- May 20 – 22: Super Final in Athens
  - Women's Solo Technical winner: (Austria) Vasiliki Alexandri
  - Women's Solo Free winner: (Austria) Vasiliki Alexandri
  - Women's Duet Technical winners: (Austria) Anna-Maria Alexandri, Eirini-Marina Alexandri & Vasiliki Alexandri (reserve)
  - Women's Duet Free winners: (Austria) Anna-Maria Alexandri, Eirini-Marina Alexandri & Vasiliki Alexandri (reserve)
  - Women's Team Technical winners: United States
  - Women's Team Free winners: Israel
  - Men's Solo Technical winner: (Spain) Fernando Díaz del Río
  - Men's Solo Free winner: (Spain) Fernando Díaz del Río
  - Mixed Duet Technical winners: (Spain) Emma García & Pau Ribes
  - Mixed Duet Free winners: (Spain) Emma García & Pau Ribes
  - Mixed Team Highlight winners: United States
  - Mixed Team Free Combination winners: Greece

==== 2022 FINA Marathon Swim World Series ====
- May 28 & 29: 1st Leg in (Portugal) Setúbal
- July 9 & 10: 2nd Leg in (France) Paris
- August 26 – 28: 3rd Leg in (Canada) Lac-Mégantic
- October 7 – 9: 4th Leg in (Puerto Rico) Fajardo
- November 11 & 12: 5th Leg in (Israel) Eilat

=== Non-FINA Events ===
==== 2022 Red Bull Cliff Diving ====
- June 4: 1st stop in (United States) Boston
- June 18: 2nd stop in (France) Paris
- July 16: 3rd stop in (Denmark) Copenhagen
- August 13: 4th stop in (Norway) Oslo
- August 27: 5th stop in (Bosnia and Herzegovina) Mostar
- September 11: 6th stop in (Switzerland) Sisikon
- September 25: 7th stop in (Italy) Polignano A Mare

==== 2022 European Aquatics Championship ====
- August 11 – 21: in (Italy) Rome

== Archery ==
=== World and Continental Championships ===
- February 14 – 19: 2022 Archery European Indoor Championships in (Slovenia) Laško
  - Barebow winners: (Sweden) Leo Pettersson (m) / (Italy) Cinzia Noziglia (f)
  - Compound winners: (Netherlands) Mike Schloesser (m) / (United Kingdom) Ella Gibson (f)
  - Recurve winners: (France) Clément Jacquey (m) / (Italy) Lisa Barbelin (f)
  - Barebow U21 winners: (Italy) Davide Morra (m) / (Romania) Elena Topliceanu (f)
  - Compound U21 winners: (Denmark) Mathias Fullerton (m) / (Russia) Arina Cherkezova (f)
  - Recurve U21 winners: (Ukraine) Alexander Kryvoruchko (m) / (Ukraine) Dzvenyslava Chernyk (f)
  - Barebow Team winners: Sweden (Viggo Axelsson, Joakim Hassila, Leo Pettersson) (m) / Italy (Cinzia Noziglia, Fabia Rovatti, Laura Turello) (f)
  - Compound Team winners: Netherlands (Sil Pater, Mike Schloesser, Max Verwoerdt) (m) / Russia (Viktoria Balzhanova, Elizaveta Knyazeva, Alexandra Savenkova) (f)
  - Recurve Team winners: France (Thomas Chirault, Clément Jacquey, Jean-Charles Valladont) (m) / Ukraine (Veronika Marchenko, Anastasia Pavlova, Polina Rodionova) (f)
  - Compound U21 Team winners: Denmark (Christoffer Berg, Tore Bjarnarson, Mathias Fullerton) (m) / Turkey (Hazal Burun, Songül Lök, İpek Tomruk) (f)
  - Recurve U21 Team winners: Russian Archery Federation (Mukhibullo Makhmudov, Bair Torgubaev, Sergey Tsyrenov) (m) / Ukraine (Dzvenyslava Chernyk, Daria Koval, Zhanna Naumova) (f)
- February 19 – 27: 2022 World Para Archery Championship in (United Arab Emirates) Dubai
  - Recurve open winners: (Japan) Tomohiro Ueyama (m) / (Italy) Vincenza Petrilli (f)
  - Compound open winners: (United States) Matt Stutzman (m) / Tatiana Andrievskaia (f)
  - W1 winners: (Turkey) Yigit Aydin (m) / (United States) Lisa Coryell (f)
  - Visual impaired 1 winner: (Belgium) Ruben Vanhollebeke (x)
  - Recurve open tem winners: Iran (m) / Italy (f & x)
  - Compound open team winners: Iran (m) / Turkey (f) / Russian Archery Federation (x)
  - W1 team winners: Turkey (f) / Italy (f) / Russian Archery Federation (x)
- March 14–20: Puerto Rico Cup 2022 – Central American and Caribbean Games Qualifier in Bayamón
  - Recurve individual winners: (Puerto Rico) Adrián Muñóz (m) / (Mexico) Alejandra Valencia (f)
  - Compound individual winners: (Mexico) Rodrigo Olvera (m) / (Mexico) Dafne Quintero (f)
  - Recurve team winners: Guatemala (m) / Colombia (f) / Mexico (x)
  - Compound team winners: Mexico (m) / Colombia (f) / Colombia (x)
- May 3 – 8: 2022 European Grand Prix in (Bulgaria) Plovdiv
- June 6 – 12: 2022 European Archery Championships in (Germany) Munich
- September 4 – 10: 2022 World Archery 3D Championship in (Italy) Terni
- September 19 – 25 : 2022 Asian Games in (China) Hangzhou
- October 3 – 9: 2022 World Archery Field Championships in (United States) Yankton
- October 8 – 15 : 2022 Asian Para Games in (China) Hangzhou

=== 2022 Archery World Cup ===
- April 18 – 24: WC #1 in (Turkey) Antalya
  - Recurve individual winners: (Spain) Miguel Alvariño (m) / (United Kingdom) Bryony Pitman (f)
  - Recurve team winners: Chinese Taipei (m) / United Kingdom (f) / India (mixed)
  - Compound individual winners: (Netherlands) Mike Schloesser (m) / (United Kingdom) Ella Gibson (f)
  - Compound team winners: India (m) / Germany (f) / Colombia (mixed)
- May 16 – 22: WC #2 in Gwangju
  - Recurve individual winners: (South Korea) Kim Woo-jin (m) / (South Korea) Choi Mi-sun (f)
  - Recurve team winners: South Korea (m) / South Korea (f) / Germany (mixed)
  - Compound individual winners: (Netherlands) Mike Schloesser (m) / (South Korea) Kim Yun-hee (f)
  - Compound team winners: India (m) / South Korea (f) / Chinese Taipei (mixed)
- June 20 – 26: WC #3 in Paris
  - Recurve individual winners: (Brazil) Marcus Vinicius D'Almeida (m) / (Japan) Agu Utano (f)
  - Recurve team winners: South Korea (m) / Chinese Taipei (f) / United States (mixed)
  - Compound individual winners: (France) Nicolas Girard (m) / (United Kingdom) Ella Gibson (f)
  - Compound team winners: France (m) / Turkey (f) / India (mixed)
- July 18 – 24: WC #4 in Medellín
  - Recurve individual winners: (South Korea) Kim Woo-jin (m) / (South Korea) Choi Mi-sun (f)
  - Recurve team winners: South Korea (m) / South Korea (f) / Chinese Taipei (mixed)
  - Compound individual winners: (United States) James Lutz (m) / (United Kingdom) Ella Gibson (f)
  - Compound team winners: France (m) / Colombia (f) / Denmark (mixed)
- October 15 – 16: WC Finals in (Mexico) Tlaxcala

=== 2022 Indoor Archery World Series ===
- January 21 – 23: Nîmes Archery Tournament in (France) Nîmes
  - Recurve winners: (Germany) Felix Wieser (m) / (France) Lisa Barbelin (f)
  - Compound winners: (France) Jean-Philippe Boulch (m) / (Belgium) Sarah Prieels (f)
  - Barebow winners: (France) Henri Dedieu (m) / (Denmark) Maria Olesen (f)
- February 4 – 6: Vegas Shoot in (United States) Las Vegas
  - Recurve winners: (United States) Brady Ellison (m) / (United States) Casey Kaufhold (f)
  - Compound winners: (United States) Bodie Turner (m) / (United States) Liko Arreola (f)
  - Men's Barebow winner: (United States) Richard Stark
- February 5: Indoor Archery World Series Finals in (United States) Las Vegas (final)
  - Recurve winners: (Germany) Felix Wieser (m) / (United Kingdom) Penny Healey (f)
  - Compound winners: (France) Nicolas Girard (m) / (Slovenia) Toja Ellison (f)

=== 2022 Asia Cup ===
- March 13–19: Stage #1 in (Thailand) Bangkok

=== 2021 Summer World University Games ===
- June 26 – July 7: in (China) Chengdu

=== 2022 World Games ===
- July 7 – 17: in (United States) Birmingham

== Association football ==
=== FIFA ===
- November 20 – December 18: 2022 FIFA World Cup in Qatar
- August 10 – 28: 2022 FIFA U-20 Women's World Cup in Costa Rica
- October 11 – 30: 2022 FIFA U-17 Women's World Cup in India

Club competitions

- February 3 – 12: 2021 FIFA Club World Cup in United Arab Emirates

=== AFC ===
- January 20 – February 6: 2022 AFC Women's Asian Cup in India
- June 1 – 19: 2022 AFC U-23 Asian Cup in Uzbekistan

Club competitions

- March 8 – February 26, 2023: 2022 AFC Champions League
- April 5 – October 22: 2022 AFC Cup

=== CAF ===
- January 9 – February 6: 2021 Africa Cup of Nations in Cameroon
- July 2 – 23: 2022 Africa Women Cup of Nations in Morocco

Club competitions

- September 10, 2021 – May 29: 2021–22 CAF Champions League
- September 10, 2021 – May: 2021–22 CAF Confederation Cup

=== CONCACAF ===
- February 25 – March 12 2022 CONCACAF Women's U-20 Championship in Dominican Republic
  - United States defeats Mexico, 2–0. Canada took 3rd place against Puerto Rico, 2–0.
- April 23 – May 8 2022 CONCACAF Women's U-17 Championship in Dominican Republic
- June 18 – July 3 2022 CONCACAF U-20 Championship in Honduras
- July 4 – 20: 2022 CONCACAF W Championship in Mexico

Club competitions

- February 15 – May 5: 2022 CONCACAF Champions League
- TBD: 2022 CONCACAF League

=== CONMEBOL ===
- July 8 – 30: 2022 Copa América Femenina in Colombia

Club competitions

- February 8 – October 29: 2022 Copa Libertadores (final in (Ecuador) Guayaquil)
- March 8 – October 1: 2022 Copa Sudamericana (final in (Brazil) Brasília)
- February 23: 2022 Recopa Sudamericana in (Brazil) Curitiba
- October 13 – 28: 2022 Copa Libertadores Femenina in Ecuador
- February 5 – 20: 2022 U-20 Copa Libertadores in Ecuador

=== OFC ===
- July 5 – 31: 2022 OFC Women's Nations Cup
- April: 2022 OFC U-20 Women's Championship

Club competitions

- TBD: 2022 OFC Champions League

=== UEFA ===
- July 6 – 31: UEFA Women's Euro 2022 in England
- July 20 – August 2: 2022 UEFA European Under-19 Championship in Slovakia
- June 26 – July 9: 2022 UEFA Women's Under-19 Championship in Czech Republic
- May 16 – June 1: 2022 UEFA European Under-17 Championship in Israel
- May 3 – 15: 2022 UEFA Women's Under-17 Championship in Bosnia and Herzegovina
  - In the final, Germany def. Spain, 2–2, 3–2 on penalties.

Club competitions

- June 22, 2021 – May 28: 2021–22 UEFA Champions League (final in (France) Paris)
  - In the final, (Spain) Real Madrid def. (England) Liverpool, 1–0.
- August 3, 2021 – May 18: 2021–22 UEFA Europa League (final in (Spain) Seville)
  - In the final, (Germany) Eintracht Frankfurt def. (Scotland) Rangers, 1–1, 5–4 on penalties.
- July 6, 2021 – May 25: 2021–22 UEFA Europa Conference League (final in (Albania) Tirana)
  - In the final, (Italy) Roma def. (Netherlands) Feyenoord, 1–0.
- August 17, 2021 – May 21: 2021–22 UEFA Women's Champions League (final in (Italy) Turin)
  - In the final, (France) Lyon def. (Spain) Barcelona, 3–1.
- September 14, 2021 – April 25: 2021–22 UEFA Youth League (final in (Switzerland) Nyon)
  - In the final, (Portugal) Benfica def. (Austria) Red Bull Salzburg, 6–0.
- August 10: 2022 UEFA Super Cup in (Finland) Helsinki

== Badminton ==
=== Grade 1 ===
==== 2022 Thomas & Uber Cup ====
- May 8 – 15: in (Thailand) Nonthaburi
  - Thomas Cup: India def. Indonesia, 3–0.
  - Uber Cup: South Korea def. China, 3–2.

==== 2022 BWF World Championships ====
- August 21 – 28: in (Japan) Tokyo

==== Continental Championships ====
- February 11–13: Oceania Junior Mixed Team Championships 2022 in (New Zealand) Auckland
  - Cancelled
- February 14–17: Oceania Junior Championships 2022 in (New Zealand) Auckland
  - Cancelled
- February 14–17: 2022 All Africa Men's and Women's Team Badminton Championships in (Uganda) Kampala
  - Men's Team: (Algeria) def. (Egypt) , 3–0.
  - Women's Team: (Egypt) def. (Uganda) , 3–1.
- February 15–20: 2022 European Men's and Women's Team Badminton Championships in (Finland) Lahti
  - Cancelled
- February 15–20: 2022 Badminton Asia Team Championships in (Malaysia) Shah Alam
  - Men's Team: (Malaysia) def. (Indonesia) , 3–0.
  - Women's Team: (Indonesia) def. (South Korea) , 3–1.
- February 17–20: 2022 Pan Am M&F Cup in (Mexico) Acapulco
  - Men's Team: (Canada) def. (Brazil) , 3–2.
  - Women's Team: (United States) def. (Canada) , 3–0.
- February 18–20: 2022 Oceania Badminton Championships in (New Zealand) Auckland
  - Cancelled

=== Grade 2 ===
==== 2022 BWF World Tour ====
BWF World Tour Finals

- December 14 – 16: in (China) Guangzhou

Super 1000

- March 16 – 20: 2022 All England Open in Birmingham
  - Men's singles: (Denmark) Viktor Axelsen def. (India) Lakshya Sen, 21–10, 21–15.
  - Women's singles: (Japan) Akane Yamaguchi def. (South Korea) An Se-young, 21–15, 21–15.
  - Men's doubles: (Indonesia) Muhammad Shohibul Fikri & (Indonesia) Bagas Maulana def. (Indonesia) Mohammad Ahsan & (Indonesia) Hendra Setiawan, 21–19, 21–13.
  - Women's doubles: (Japan) Nami Matsuyama & (Japan) Chiharu Shida def. (China) Zhang Shuxian & (China) Zheng Yu, 21–13, 21–9.
  - Mixed doubles: (Japan) Yuta Watanabe & (Japan) Arisa Higashino def. (China) Wang Yilyu & (China) Huang Dongping, 21–19, 21–19.
- June 14 – 19: Indonesia Open in Jakarta
- November 29 – December 4: China Open in Guangzhou

Super 750

- June 28 – August 3: 2022 Malaysia Open in TBD
- August 30 – September 4: 2022 Japan Open in Osaka
- October 18 – 23: 2022 Denmark Open in Odense
- October 25 – 30: 2022 French Open in (France) Paris
- December 6 – 11: 2022 Fuzhou China Open in Fuzhou

Super 500

- January 11–16: 2022 India Open in New Delhi
  - Men's singles: (India) Lakshya Sen def. (Singapore) Loh Kean Yew, 24–22, 21–17.
  - Women's singles: (Thailand) Busanan Ongbamrungphan def. (Thailand) Supanida Katethong, 22–20, 19–21, 21–13.
  - Men's doubles: (India) Satwiksairaj Rankireddy & (India) Chirag Shetty def. (Indonesia) Mohammad Ahsan & (Indonesia) Hendra Setiawan, 21–16, 26–24.
  - Women's doubles: (Thailand) Benyapa Aimsaard & (Thailand) Nuntakarn Aimsaard def. (Russia) Anastasiia Akchurina & (Russia) Olga Morozova, 21–13, 21–5.
  - Mixed doubles: (Singapore) Terry Hee & (Singapore) Tan Wei Han def. (Malaysia) Chen Tang Jie & (Malaysia) Peck Yen Wei, 21–15, 21–18.
- April 5–10: 2022 Korea Open in (South Korea) Suncheon
  - Men's singles: (China) Weng Hongyang def. (Indonesia) Jonatan Christie, 12–21, 21–19, 21–15.
  - Women's singles: (South Korea) An Se-young def. (Thailand) Pornpawee Chochuwong, 21–17, 21–18.
  - Men's doubles: (South Korea) Kang Min-hyuk & (South Korea) Seo Seung-jae def. (Indonesia) Fajar Alfian & (Indonesia) Muhammad Rian Ardianto, 19–21, 21–15, 21–18.
  - Women's doubles: (South Korea) Jeong Na-eun & (South Korea) Kim Hye-jeong def. (Thailand) Benyapa Aimsaard & (Thailand) Nuntakarn Aimsaard, 21–16, 21–12.
  - Mixed doubles: (Malaysia) Tan Kian Meng & (Malaysia) Lai Pei Jing def. (South Korea) Ko Sung-hyun & (South Korea) Eom Hye-won, 21–15, 21–18.
- May 17–22: 2022 Thailand Open in Bangkok
  - Men's singles:
  - Women's singles:
  - Men's doubles:
  - Women's doubles:
  - Mixed doubles:

Super 300

- January 17–23: 2022 Syed Modi International in (India) Lucknow
  - Men's singles: Not awarded
  - Women's singles: (India) P. V. Sindhu def. (India) Malvika Bansod, 21–13, 21–16.
  - Men's doubles: (Malaysia) Man Wei Chong & (Malaysia) Tee Kai Wun def. (India) Krishna Prasad Garaga & (India) Vishnuvardhan Goud Panjala, 21–18, 21–15.
  - Women's doubles: (Malaysia) Anna Cheong & (Malaysia) Teoh Mei Xing def. (India) Gayathri Gopichand & (India) Treesa Jolly, 21–12, 21–13.
  - Mixed doubles: (India) Ishaan Bhatnagar & (India) Tanisha Crasto def. (India) T. Hema Nagendra Babu & (India) Srivedya Gurazada, 21–16, 21–12.
- March 1–6: 2022 Spain Masters in Huelva
  - Cancelled
- March 8–13: 2022 German Open in (Germany) Mülheim
  - Men's singles: (Thailand) Kunlavut Vitidsarn def. (India) Lakshya Sen, 21–18, 21–15.
  - Women's singles: (China) He Bingjiao def. (China) Chen Yufei, 21–14, 27–25.
  - Men's doubles: (Malaysia) Goh Sze Fei & (Malaysia) Nur Izzuddin def. (China) Liu Yuchen & (China) Ou Xuanyi, 23–21, 16–21, 21–14.
  - Women's doubles: (China) Chen Qingchen & (China) Jia Yifan def. (Bulgaria) Gabriela Stoeva & (Bulgaria) Stefani Stoeva, 21–16, 29–30, 21–19.
  - Mixed doubles: (Thailand) Dechapol Puavaranukroh & (Thailand) Sapsiree Taerattanachai def. (China) Ou Xuanyi & (China) Huang Yaqiong, 21–11, 21–9.
- March 22 – 27: 2022 Swiss Open in (Switzerland) Basel
  - Men's singles: (Indonesia) Jonatan Christie def. (India) Prannoy H. S., 21–12, 21–18.
  - Women's singles: (India) P. V. Sindhu def. (Thailand) Busanan Ongbamrungphan, 21–16, 21–8.
  - Men's doubles: (Indonesia) Fajar Alfian & (Indonesia) Muhammad Rian Ardianto def. (Malaysia) Goh Sze Fei & (Malaysia) Nur Izzuddin, 21–18, 21–19.
  - Women's doubles: (Bulgaria) Gabriela Stoeva & (Bulgaria) Stefani Stoeva def. (Germany) Linda Efler & (Germany) Isabel Lohau, 21–14, 21–12.
  - Mixed doubles: (Germany) Mark Lamsfuß & (Germany) Isabel Lohau def. (Malaysia) Goh Soon Huat & (Malaysia) Shevon Jemie Lai, 12–21, 21–18, 21–17.
- April 12–17: 2022 Korea Masters in (South Korea) Gwangju
  - Men's singles: (South Korea) Jeon Hyeok-jin def. (Japan) Kodai Naraoka, 21–17, 21–16.
  - Women's singles: (China) He Bingjiao def. (China) Chen Yufei, 21–14, 14–21, 21–9.
  - Men's doubles: (South Korea) Kim Gi-jung & (South Korea) Kim Sa-rang def. (China) Liu Yuchen & (China) Ou Xuanyi, 21–14, 21–16.
  - Women's doubles: (South Korea) Kim So-yeong & (South Korea) Kong Hee-yong def. (South Korea) Baek Ha-na & (South Korea) Lee Yu-rim, 21–17, 21–12.
  - Mixed doubles: (China) Wang Yilyu & (China) Huang Dongping def. (China) Ou Xuanyi & (China) Huang Yaqiong, 21–17, 21–17.

Super 100

- January 25–30: 2022 Odisha Open in (India) Cuttack
  - Men's singles: (India) Kiran George def. (India) Priyanshu Rajawat, 21–15, 14–21, 21–18.
  - Women's singles: (India) Unnati Hooda def. (India) Smit Toshniwal, 21–18, 21–11.
  - Men's doubles: (Malaysia) Nur Mohd Azriyn Ayub & (Malaysia) Lim Khim Wah def. (India) Ravikrishna Ps & (India) Sankar Prasad Udayakumar, 18–21, 21–14, 21–16.
  - Women's doubles: (India) Gayathri Gopichand & (India) Treesa Jolly def. (India) Sanyogita Ghorpade & (India) Shruti Mishra, 21–12, 21–10.
  - Mixed doubles: (Sri Lanka) Sachin Dias & (Sri Lanka) Thilini Hendahewa def. (India) Arjun M.R. & (India) Treesa Jolly, 21–16, 22–20.
- March 29 – April 3: 2022 Orléans Masters in (France) Orléans
  - Men's singles: (France) Toma Junior Popov def. (India) Mithun Manjunath, 21–11, 21–19.
  - Women's singles: (Indonesia) Putri Kusuma Wardani def. (United States) Iris Wang, 7–21, 21–19, 21–18.
  - Men's doubles: (Netherlands) Ruben Jille & (Netherlands) Ties van der Lecq def. (Malaysia) Junaidi Arif & (Malaysia) Muhammad Haikal, Walkover.
  - Women's doubles: (Bulgaria) Gabriela Stoeva & (Bulgaria) Stefani Stoeva def. (Germany) Stine Küspert & (Germany) Emma Moszczyński, 21–15, 21–14.
  - Mixed doubles: (Singapore) Terry Hee & (Singapore) Tan Wei Han def. (Indonesia) Rehan Naufal Kusharjanto & (Indonesia) Lisa Ayu Kusumawati, 21–12, 16–21, 21–13.

=== Grade 3 ===
==== BWF International Challenge ====
- January 27–30: 2022 Ukraine Open in Kyiv
  - Men's singles: (France) Christo Popov def. (Malaysia) Ong Ken Yon, 21–14, 22–20.
  - Women's singles: (Turkey) Aliye Demirbağ def. (Canada) Wen Yu Zhang, 21–13, 21–16.
  - Men's doubles: (Malaysia) Chia Wei Jie & (Malaysia) Low Hang Yee def. (Denmark) Emil Lauritzen & (Denmark) Mads Vestergaard, 19–21, 22–20, 23–21.
  - Women's doubles: (Germany) Stine Küspert & (Germany) Emma Moszczyński def. (Ukraine) Mariia Stoliarenko & (Ukraine) Yelyzaveta Zharka, 21–18, 21–12.
  - Mixed doubles: (Germany) Jones Ralfy Jansen & (Germany) Linda Efler def. (Germany) Jan Colin Völker & (Germany) Stine Küspert, 21–12, 21–11.
- February 7–11: 2022 Iran Fajr International Challenge in Shiraz
  - Men's singles: (India) Meiraba Luwang Maisnam def. (Ukraine) Danylo Bosniuk, 18–21, 21–13, 21–19.
  - Women's singles: (India) Tasnim Mir def. (Indonesia) Yulia Yosephine Susanto, 21–11, 11–21, 21–7.
  - Men's doubles: (Indonesia) Abiyyu Fauzan Majid & (Indonesia) Ferdian Mahardika Ranialdy def. (Iran) Amir Jabbari & (Iran) Mehran Shahbazi, 21–15, 21–12.
  - Women's doubles: (Russia) Ekaterina Malkova & (Russia) Anastasiia Shapovalova def. (Iran) Hajar Kabiri & (Iran) Saghar Rafei, 21–3, 21–13.
- February 18–20: 2022 African Badminton Championships in (Uganda) Kampala
  - Men's singles: (Nigeria) Anuoluwapo Juwon Opeyori def. (Uganda) Brian Kasirye, 21–14, 23–21.
  - Women's singles: (Egypt) Nour Ahmed Youssri def. (Egypt) Doha Hany, 21–16, 21–16.
  - Men's doubles: (Algeria) Koceila Mammeri & (Algeria) Youcef Sabri Medel def. (Egypt) Adham Hatem Elgamal & (Egypt) Ahmed Salah, 21–23, 21–19, 21–18.
  - Women's doubles: (Mauritius) Lorna Bodha & (Mauritius) Kobita Dookhee def. (South Africa) Amy Ackerman & (South Africa) Deidre Laurens Jordaan, 21–18, 22–20.
  - Mixed doubles: (Algeria) Koceila Mammeri & (Algeria) Tanina Mammeri def. (South Africa) Jarred Elliott & (South Africa) Amy Ackerman, 21–13, 21–14.
- February 24–27: 2022 Uganda International in Kampala
  - Men's singles: (France) Arnaud Merklé def. (India) Harshit Aggarwal, 21–15, 18–21, 21–16.
  - Women's singles: (Canada) Talia Ng def. (India) Mansi Singh, 21–10, 21–12.
  - Men's doubles: (Malaysia) Boon Xin Yuan & (Malaysia) Wong Tien Ci def. (Germany) Jones Ralfy Jansen & (Germany) Jan Colin Völker, 21–15, 21–14.
  - Women's doubles: (Malaysia) Kasturi Radhakrishnan & (Malaysia) Venosha Radhakrishnan def. (Italy) Martina Corsini & (Italy) Judith Mair, 21–18, 21–19.
  - Mixed doubles: (Algeria) Koceila Mammeri & (Algeria) Tanina Mammeri def. (India) Senthil Vel Govindarasu & (Malaysia) Venosha Radhakrishnan, 19–21, 21–18, 22–20.
- February 25–27: Italian Junior 2022 in (Italy) Milan
  - Cancelled
- March 22–27: Vietnam International Challenge 2022 in Hanoi
  - Cancelled
- March 24–27: 2022 Polish Open in (Poland) Arłamów
  - Men's singles: (India) Kiran George def. (Chinese Taipei) Lee Chia-hao, 21–15, 21–14.
  - Women's singles: (India) Anupama Upadhyaya def. (India) Aditi Bhatt, 17–21, 21–14, 21–17.
  - Men's doubles: (Denmark) Rasmus Kjær & (Denmark) Frederik Søgaard def. (Chinese Taipei) Su Ching-heng & (Chinese Taipei) Ye Hong-wei, 21–16, 17–21, 21–19.
  - Women's doubles: (Hong Kong) Yeung Nga Ting & (Hong Kong) Yeung Pui Lam def. (Chinese Taipei) Lee Chia-hsin & (Chinese Taipei) Teng Chun-hsun, 21–9, 21–18.
  - Mixed doubles: (Chinese Taipei) Ye Hong-wei & (Chinese Taipei) Lee Chia-hsin def. (Poland) Paweł Śmiłowski & (Poland) Wiktoria Adamek, 22–20, 21–17.
- April 6–10: Osaka International Challenge 2022 in (Japan) Sakai
  - Cancelled
- April 12–16: 2022 Mexican International Challenge in (Mexico) Aguascalientes
  - Men's singles: (Japan) Minoru Koga def. (Brazil) Jonathan Matias, 10–21, 22–20, 21–13.
  - Women's singles: (Japan) Riko Gunji def. (Japan) Natsuki Nidaira, 10–21, 22–20, 21–13.
  - Men's doubles: (Japan) Shuntaro Mezaki & (Japan) Haruya Nishida def. (Germany) Jones Ralfy Jansen & (Germany) Jan Colin Völker, 21–15, 21–16.
  - Women's doubles: (Japan) Rui Hirokami & (Japan) Yuna Kato def. (Japan) Ayako Sakuramoto & (Japan) Hinata Suzuki, 15–21, 21–19, 21–17.
  - Mixed doubles: (Japan) Naoki Yamada & (Japan) Moe Ikeuchi def. (United States) Vinson Chiu & (United States) Jennie Gai, 21–15, 18–21, 21–10.

==== BWF International Series ====
- January 13–16: 2022 Estonian International in (Estonia) Tallinn
  - Men's singles: (France) Alex Lanier def. (Malaysia) Kok Jing Hong, 22–20, 21–15.
  - Women's singles: (Estonia) Kristin Kuuba def. (Thailand) Thamonwan Nithiittikrai, 19–21, 23–21, 21–15.
  - Men's doubles: (Thailand) Ruttanapak Oupthong & (Thailand) Sirawit Sothon def. (Singapore) Danny Bawa Chrisnanta & (Singapore) Andy Kwek, 21–17, 17–21, 21–16.
  - Women's doubles: (Thailand) Chasinee Korepap & (Thailand) Jhenicha Sudjaipraparat def. (Russia) Viktoriia Kozyreva & (Russia) Mariia Sukhova, 21–14, 21–15.
  - Mixed doubles: (Thailand) Ratchapol Makkasasithorn & (Thailand) Jhenicha Sudjaipraparat def. (Thailand) Ruttanapak Oupthong & (Thailand) Chasinee Korepap, 21–15, 21–14.
- January 18–23: 2022 Swedish Open in (Sweden) Uppsala
  - Men's singles: (Malaysia) Kok Jing Hong def. (Malaysia) Yeoh Seng Zoe, Walkover.
  - Women's singles: (Thailand) Pitchamon Opatniput def. (Thailand) Pornpicha Choeikeewong, 16–21, 21–9, 21–16.
  - Men's doubles: (Singapore) Danny Bawa Chrisnanta & (Singapore) Andy Kwek def. (Malaysia) Chia Wei Jie & (Malaysia) Low Hang Yee, 21–13, 23–21.
  - Women's doubles: (Thailand) Chasinee Korepap & (Thailand) Jhenicha Sudjaipraparat def. (Sweden) Johanna Magnusson & (Sweden) Clara Nistad, 21–16, 23–21.
  - Mixed doubles: (Finland) Anton Kaisti & (Czech Republic) Alžběta Bášová def. (Denmark) Kristian Kræmer & (Denmark) Amalie Cecilie Kudsk, 21–19, 21–16.
- January 28–30: 2022 Swedish Junior Open in (Sweden) Uppsala
  - Cancelled
- February 2–06: 2022 Iran Junior International Series in Shiraz
  - Men's singles: (India) Sankar Subramanian def. (Iran) Ali Hayati, 21–17, 21–17.
  - Women's singles: (India) Samayara Panwar def. (Iran) Ferdous Foroughi, 21–14, 21–15.
  - Men's doubles: (Iran) Ali Hayati & (Iran) Mohammad Zarchi def. (Iran) Hajmalek Amirmohammad & (Iran) Amirhossein Hasani, 21–18, 21–16.
  - Women's doubles: (Iran) Ferdous Foroughi & (Iran) Mobina Nedaei def. (India) Samayara Panwar & (Armenia) Elen Tiraturyan, 21–15, 21–13.
- February 3–06: 2022 Malta Junior International in Cospicua
  - Cancelled
- February 10–13: 2022 Hungarian Junior International Championships in (Hungary) Pécs
  - Men's singles: (Germany) Sanjeevi Padmanabhan def. (France) Paul Tournefier, 21–19, 11–4 (ret).
  - Women's singles: (Czech Republic) Petra Maixnerová def. (Czech Republic) Lucie Krulová, Walkover.
  - Men's doubles: (Germany) Jarne Schlevoigt & (Germany) Nikolaj Stupplich def. (Serbia) Igor Jovanovic & (Serbia) Aleksandar Jovicic, Walkover.
  - Women's doubles: (Germany) Selin Hübsch & (Germany) Julia Meyer def. (France) Adele Fillonneau & (France) Eulalie Serre, 22–20, 21–10.
  - Mixed doubles: (Germany) Jarne Schlevoigt & (Germany) Julia Meyer def. (Germany) Jonathan Dresp & (Germany) Cara Siebrecht, 21–18, 25–23.
- March 10–13: 2022 Portugal International Championships in Caldas da Rainha
  - Men's singles: (Indonesia) Andi Fadel Muhammad def. (Denmark) Karan Rajan Rajarajan, 21–11, 21–18.
  - Women's singles: (Chinese Taipei) Hsu Wen-chi def. (Hong Kong) Yeung Sum Yee, 21–13, 21–17.
  - Men's doubles: (Chinese Taipei) Su Ching-heng & (Chinese Taipei) Ye Hong-wei def. (Chinese Taipei) Wei Chun-wei & (Chinese Taipei) Wu Guan-xun, 21–13, 21–14.
  - Women's doubles: (Hong Kong) Yeung Nga Ting & (Hong Kong) Yeung Pui Lam def. (France) Sharone Bauer & (France) Vimala Hériau, 21–14, 21–8.
  - Mixed doubles: (Chinese Taipei) Ye Hong-wei & (Chinese Taipei) Lee Chia-hsin def. (Germany) Jan Colin Völker & (Germany) Stine Küspert, 21–10, 19–21, 21–9.
- March 18–20: 2022 Spanish Junior Open in (Spain) Oviedo
  - Postponed
- March 24–26: Israel Junior 2022 in Rishon LeZion
  - Men's singles: (Czech Republic) David Smutný def. (Czech Republic) Daniel Dvořák, 21–13, 21–16.
  - Women's singles: (India) Anwesha Gowda def. (Czech Republic) Petra Maixnerová, 21–17, 21–8.
  - Men's doubles: (Czech Republic) Daniel Dvořák & (Czech Republic) Jan Rázl def. (Israel) Mayan Mogilner & (Israel) Sharon Perelshtein, 21–10, 21–6.
  - Women's doubles: (Estonia) Elisaveta Berik & (Estonia) Emili Pärsim def. (Croatia) Stella Balenović & (Croatia) Ana Pranić, 17–21, 21–11, 21–15.
  - Mixed doubles: (Czech Republic) Jan Rázl & (Czech Republic) Petra Maixnerová def. (Estonia) Rene Leeman & (Estonia) Emilia Shapovalova, 21–7, 21–10.

==== BWF Future Series ====
- January 27–30: 2022 Iceland International in Reykjavík
  - Cancelled
- February 28 – March 2: Uganda Junior International 2022 in Kampala
  - Men's singles: (Mauritius) Khemtish Rai Nundah def. (Uganda) Akbar Oduka, 21–15, 21–12.
  - Women's singles: (India) Anupama Upadhyaya def. (India) Meghana Mareddy, 21–10, 12–21, 21–17.
  - Men's doubles: (Mauritius) Jason Francois & (Mauritius) Khemtish Rai Nundah def. (Uganda) Guna Kusal Dhulupudi & (Uganda) Paul Makande, 21–18, 21–13.
  - Women's doubles: (Uganda) Fadilah Shamika Mohamed & (Uganda) Tracy Naluwooza def. (Uganda) Diya Chetan & (Uganda) Brenda Namanya, 21–5, 21–3.
  - Mixed doubles: (Uganda) Paul Makande & (Uganda) Fadilah Shamika Mohamed def. (Uganda) Abed Bukenya & (Uganda) Tracy Naluwooza, 21–15, 21–14.
- March 2–5: 2022 Slovak Open in (Slovenia) Trenčín
  - Men's singles: (Japan) Riku Hatano def. (Chinese Taipei) Chi Yu-jen, 21–17, 21–15.
  - Women's singles: (India) Aditi Bhatt def. (Chinese Taipei) Hsu Wen-chi, 19–21, 21–10, 25–23.
  - Men's doubles: (Malaysia) Boon Xin Yuan & (Malaysia) Wong Tien Ci def. (Hong Kong) Law Cheuk Him & (Hong Kong) Lee Chun Hei, 21–18, 14–21, 21–19.
  - Women's doubles: (Chinese Taipei) Lee Chia-hsin & (Chinese Taipei) Teng Chun-hsun def. (Hong Kong) Yeung Nga Ting & (Hong Kong) Yeung Pui Lam, 21–16, 15–21, 22–20.
  - Mixed doubles: (Hong Kong) Yeung Ming Nok & (Hong Kong) Yeung Pui Lam def. (Poland) Wiktor Trecki & (Poland) Magdalena Świerczyńska, 21–16, 21–12.
- March 16–20: Torneo Internacional Giraldilla 2022 in (Cuba) Havana
  - Postponed

== Bandy ==
- January 21 – 23: 2022 Bandy World Championship Y21 in (Finland) Jyväskylä
  - Cancelled due to the COVID-19 pandemic
- March 11 – 13: 2022 Girl's Bandy World Championship Y17 in (Sweden) Lidköping
- March 23 – 27: 2022 Women's Bandy World Championship in Åby
  - Final placements: (gold) : Sweden, (silver) : Norway, (bronze) : Finland
- March 24 – 26: 2022 Bandy World Championship Y17 in (Russia) Kemerovo
  - Cancelled due Russian invasion of Ukraine
- March 27 – April 3: 2020 Bandy World Championship in (Russia) Syktyvkar (since before postponed to 2022 due to the COVID-19 pandemic)
  - Cancelled due Russian invasion of Ukraine
- April 1 – 3: 2022 Bandy World Championship Y19 in (Sweden) Katrineholm

== Baseball ==
- January 28 – February 3: 2022 Caribbean Series in (Dominican Republic) Santo Domingo
  - In the final, (Colombia) Caimanes de Barranquilla def. (Dominican Republic) Gigantes del Cibao, 4–1, to win their 1st title.
- September 9 – 18: 2022 U-18 Baseball World Cup in (United States) Sarasota and Bradenton
- TBC: 2022 U-15 Baseball World Cup
- TBC: 2022 U-12 Baseball World Cup

=== Major League Baseball ===
- March 31 – October 2: 2022 Major League Baseball season
- July 12: 2022 Major League Baseball All-Star Game at Dodger Stadium in Los Angeles, California
- July 17–19: 2022 Major League Baseball draft
- October 7 – November 5: 2022 MLB postseason: (Texas) Houston Astros defeat (Pennsylvania) Philadelphia Phillies 4–2 in 2022 World Series

=== 2022 Little League Baseball World Series ===
- August 18 – 28: Little League World Series in (Pennsylvania) South Williamsport at both the Little League Volunteer Stadium and Howard J. Lamade Stadium

== Basketball ==
- September 22 – October 1: 2022 FIBA Women's Basketball World Cup in Australia

=== National Basketball Association ===
- October 19, 2021 – April 10, 2022: 2021–22 NBA season
- February 20: 2022 NBA All-Star Game at Rocket Mortgage FieldHouse in (United States) Cleveland, Ohio
  - All-Star Game: Team LeBron defeats Team Durant 163 – 160.
  - Skills Challenge: Team Cavs (Jarrett Allen, Darius Garland, Evan Mobley) (Cleveland)
  - Three Point Contest: Karl-Anthony Towns (Minnesota)
  - Slam Dunk Contest: Obi Toppin (New York)
- April 16 – June 16 : 2022 NBA playoffs (California) Golden State Warriors defeated (Massachusetts) Boston Celtics 4–2 in the 2022 NBA Finals
- June 23: 2022 NBA draft

=== National Collegiate Athletic Association ===
- March 15 – April 4: 2022 NCAA Division I men's basketball tournament
- March 18 – April 3: 2022 NCAA Division I women's basketball tournament

=== FIBA Africa ===
- October 21, 2021 – May 28: 2022 BAL season

=== FIBA Americas ===
- September 2 – 11: 2022 FIBA AmeriCup in Brazil
- December 10, 2021 – April: 2021–22 BCL Americas

=== FIBA Asia ===
- July 12 – 24: 2022 FIBA Asia Cup in Indonesia
- September 26 – October 1: 2022 FIBA Asia Champions Cup
- TBD for October: 2022–23 East Asia Super League

=== FIBA Europe ===
Men's

- September 30, 2021 – May 29: 2021–22 EuroLeague
  - In the final, (Turkey) Anadolu Efes def. (Spain) Real Madrid, 58–57.
- October 19, 2021 – May 11: 2021–22 EuroCup Basketball
  - In the final, (Italy) Virtus Segafredo Bologna def. (Turkey) Frutti Extra Bursaspor, 80–67.
- September 13, 2021 – May 8: 2021–22 Basketball Champions League
  - In the final, (Spain) Lenovo Tenerife def. (Spain) Baxi Manresa, 98–87.
- September 28, 2021 – April 27: 2021–22 FIBA Europe Cup
  - In the final, (Turkey) Bahçeşehir Koleji def. (Italy) UNAHOTELS Reggio Emilia, 72–69, 90–74.
- September 1 – 18: EuroBasket 2022 in Czech Republic, Georgia, Italy, Germany

Women's

- September 21, 2021 – April 10: 2021–22 EuroLeague Women
  - In the final, (Hungary) Sopron Basket def. (Turkey) Fenerbahçe, 60–55.
- September 23, 2021 – April 6: 2021–22 EuroCup Women
  - In the final, (France) Tango Bourges Basket def. (Italy) Umana Reyer Venezia, 74–38.

Regional
Men's

- September 23, 2021 –: 2021–22 Alpe Adria Cup
- October 12, 2021 – May 1: 2021–22 BIBL season
- October 1, 2021 –: 2021–22 Latvian–Estonian Basketball League
- September 24, 2021 –: 2021–22 BNXT League
- September 24, 2021 –: 2021–22 ABA League First Division
- October 11, 2021 –: 2021–22 ABA League Second Division

Women's

- September 30, 2021 –: 2021–22 Baltic Women's Basketball League
- September 29, 2021 –: 2021–22 WABA League

== Basque pelota ==
- October 23 – 30: 2022 Basque Pelota World Championships in (France) Biarritz

== Beach handball ==
=== AHF ===
- March 20 – 29: 2022 Asian Beach Handball Championship in (Thailand) Pattaya

=== EHF ===
==== 2021–22 European Beach Handball Tour ====
- January 29 & 30: Winter Prague Open Beach Handball in (Czech Republic) Prague
  - Winners: (Poland) Piotrków Trybunalski (m) / (Croatia) BHC Zagreb (f)
- May 26 – 29: Camelot Beach Tournament in (Netherlands) Tilburg
- June 2 – 5: AC Life StyleBeach Handball Erice in (Italy) Erice
- July 1 – 3: LBHX in France
- July 1 – 3: Damp Beach Open in (Germany) Damp
- July 14 & 15: Åhus Beachhandboll Festival in Sweden

== Beach tennis ==
=== 2022 ITF Beach Tennis World Tour ===
BT400

- February 17 – 19: BT400 #1 in (Brazil) Balneário Rincão

BT200

- January 21 – 23: BT200 #1 in (Brazil) Santos
  - Winners: (Brazil) André Baran & (France) Théo Irigaray (m) / (Italy) Giulia Gasparri & (Italy) Ninny Valentini
- January 28 – 30: BT200 #2 in (Brazil) Campinas
  - Winners: (Italy) Michele Cappelletti & (Spain) Antomi Ramos Viera (m) / (Venezuela) Patrícia Diaz & (Brazil) Rafaella Miiller
- February 4 – 6: BT200 #3 in (Brazil) Campinas
  - Winners: (Brazil) Daniel Schmitt & (Spain) João Wiesinger (m) / (Germany) Maraike Biglmaier & (Spain) Eva Fernández Palos
- February 11 – 13: BT200 #4 in (Brazil) Matinhos

BT50

- January 8 & 9: BT50 #1 in (Mexico) Puerto Morelos
  - Winners: (Puerto Rico) Hiram Ramos & (Puerto Rico) Luis Miguel Reyes Peñalverty (m) / (Portugal) Manuela Cunha & (Germany) Sophie Marie Schmidt
- January 14 – 16: BT50 #2 in (Brazil) Guarapari
  - Winners: (Brazil) Hugo Russo & (Brazil) Augusto Russo (m) / (Brazil) Juliana Lima & (Brazil) Bruna Macedo
- February 5 & 6: BT50 #3 in (Chile) Ránquil
  - Cancelled

BT10

- January 7: BT10 #1 in (Mexico) Puerto Morelos
  - Winners: (Argentina) Lucas Fabeiro & (Mexico) Jorge Molina (m) / (Portugal) Manuela Cunha & (Germany) Sophie Marie Schmidt
- January 13: BT10 #2 in (Brazil) Guarapari
  - Winners: (Brazil) Raphael Borges & (Brazil) Ronaldo Paiva (m) / (Brazil) Lara Albani & (Brazil) Brunella Paiva
- January 15: BT10 #3 in (United States) Tampa
  - Winners: (Venezuela) Jose Castillo & (Venezuela) Rafael Navas Crespo (m) / (Mexico) Jessica Cortes & (United States) Jessica Sucupira
- January 19: BT10 #4 in (Brazil) Santos
  - Winners: (Brazil) Gustavo Garbarski & (Brazil) Natã Porte (m) / (Brazil) Roberta Argentino & (Brazil) Julianna Martins
- January 27: BT10 #5 in (Brazil) Campinas
  - Winners: (Brazil) Pedro Dellanegra & (Brazil) Ricardo Strazzacappa Barone (m) / (Brazil) Brenda Brissac & (Brazil) Camila Gouveia de Barros
- January 28 – 30: BT10 #6 in (Aruba) Oranjestad
  - Winners: (France) Bertrand Coulet & (Netherlands) John Herrera (m) / (Aruba) Maria Buuts & (Netherlands) Martine van Woudenberg
- January 29 & 30: BT10 #7 in (Chile) Viña del Mar
  - Winners: (Chile) Braulio Cortés & (Chile) Pablo Rojas (m) / (Chile) Josefa Valdivia & (Chile) Javiera Veloso
- January 29: BT10 #8 in Estonia #1
  - Winners: (France) Estéban Bonnet & (France) Benjamin Gros (m) / (Estonia) Kätlin Järveoja & (Estonia) Eneli Pormeister
- January 30: BT10 #9 in Estonia #2
  - Winners: (France) Estéban Bonnet & (France) Benjamin Gros (m) / (Estonia) Kätlin Järveoja & (Estonia) Eneli Pormeister
- February 2 & 3: BT10 #10 in (Chile) Ránquil
  - Cancelled
- February 3: BT10 #11 in (Brazil) Campinas
  - Winners: (Brazil) Murilo Valadares & (Brazil) Augusto Oliveira (m) / (Brazil) Giovana Lourenço Trusz & (Brazil) Isadora Lourenço Trusz
- February 9 & 10: BT10 #12 in (Chile) Cobquecura
  - Cancelled
- February 10: BT10 #13 in (Brazil) Matinhos
  - Winners: (Brazil) Anderson Mendonça da Silva & (Brazil) Matheus Montibeller (m) / (Russia) Sophia Romanova & (Russia) Polina Soldatenkova
- February 18 – 20: BT10 #14 in (Chile) El Tabo
  - Cancelled
- February 25 & 26: BT10 #15 in (Chile) Algarrobo #1
  - Cancelled
- February 25 – 27: BT10 #16 in (Aruba) Oranjestad
- February 27: BT10 #15 in (Chile) Algarrobo #2
  - Cancelled

== Beach volleyball ==
=== 2022 Volleyball World Beach Pro Tour ===
Elite 16
Challenge

=== 2022–22 South American Continental Cup ===
- March 30 & 31, 2021: Continental Cup #1 in (Chile) Santiago
  - Men's winners: (Brazil) André Stein & George Wanderley, Runner-up: (Argentina) Julian Azaad & Nicolás Capogrosso
  - Women's winners: (Venezuela) Norisbeth Agudo & Gabriela Brito, Runner-up: (Argentina) Ana Gallay & Fernanda Pereyra
- January 7 – 9: Continental Cup #2 in (Argentina) San Juan
  - Men's winners: (Brazil) Adrielson Silva & Arthur da Silva Mariano, Runner-up: (Argentina) Nicolás Capogrosso & Tomás Capogrosso
  - Women's winners: (Argentina) Ana Gallay & Fernanda Pereyra, Runner-up: (Paraguay) Erika Mongelos & Giuliana Poletti
- January 14 – 16: Continental Cup #3 in (Uruguay) Montevideo
  - Men's winners: (Uruguay) Hans Hannibal & Marco Cairús, Runner-up: (Chile) Noé Aravena & Vicente Droguett
  - Women's winners: (Brazil) Ângela Lavalle & Claudinere Bento Sabino, Runner-up: (Chile) María Francisca Rivas & Chris Vorpahl
- February 4 – 6: Continental Cup #4 in (Chile) Viña del Mar
- March 4 – 6: Continental Cup #5 in (Peru) Mollendo
- March 11 – 13: Continental Cup #6 in (Bolivia) Cochabamba
- May 13 – 15: Continental Cup #7 in (Brazil) Uberlândia (final)

== Bobsleigh & Skeleton ==
- January 9: IBSF Skeleton Junior and U20 European Championships 2022 in (Germany) Altenberg
  - Juniors winners: (Russia) Evgeniy Rukosuev (m) / (France) Agathe Bessard (f)
  - U20 Skeleton winners: (Latvia) Elvis Veinbergs (m) / (Russia) Polina Turina (f)
- January 14 – 16: IBSF European Championships 2022 in (Switzerland) St. Moritz
  - 2-man Bobsleigh winners: (Germany) Francesco Friedrich & Thorsten Margis
  - 2-woman Bobsleigh winners: (Germany) Kim Kalicki & Lisa Buckwitz
  - 4-man Bobsleigh winners: Latvia (Oskars Ķibermanis, Edgars Nemme, Matīss Miknis, Dāvis Spriņģis)
  - Women's Monobob winner: (Germany) Mariama Jamanka
  - Skeleton winners: (Latvia) Martins Dukurs (m) / (Netherlands) Kimberley Bos (f)
- January 14 – 16: IBSF Junior and Youth European Championships 2022 in Winterberg
  - Juniors 2-man Bobsleigh winners: (Germany) Philipp Zielasko & Henrik Proske
  - U23 2-man Bobsleigh winners: (Russia) Stepan Dubinko & Aleksei Kislitsa
  - U23 2-woman Bobsleigh winners: (Romania) Georgeta Popescu & Antonia Sârbu
  - Juniors 2-woman Bobsleigh winners: (Germany) Maureen Zimmer & Anabel Galander
  - U23 4-man Bobsleigh winners: Russia (Stepan Dubinko, Nikita Ivanov, Ilia Ivanov, Aleksei Kislitsa)
  - Junior 4-man Bobsleigh winners: Germany (Nico Semmler, Oliver Peschk, Rupert Schenk, Marvin Paul)
  - Women's Monobob Youth winner: (Romania) Georgeta Popescu
  - Women's Monobob Junior winner: (Romania) Georgeta Popescu
- January 21 – 23: IBSF Junior World Championships 2022 in (Austria) Innsbruck
  - Juniors 2-man Bobsleigh winners: (Germany) Maximilian Illmann & Lukas Koller
  - U23 2-man Bobsleigh winners: (Germany) Laurin Zern & Rupert Schenk
  - U23 2-woman Bobsleigh winners: (Germany) Diana Filipszki & Lauryn Siebert
  - Juniors 2-woman Bobsleigh winners: (Russia) Lubov Chernykh & Anastasia Kurysheva
  - Junior 4-man Bobsleigh winners: Latvia (Dāvis Kaufmanis, Lauris Kaufmanis, Arnis Bebrišs, Ivo Dans Kleinbergs)
  - U23 4-man Bobsleigh winners: Russia (Stepan Dubinko, Nikita Ivanov, Egor Gryaznov, Aleksei Kislitsa)
  - Women's Monobob Junior winner: (Germany) Maureen Zimmer
  - Women's U23 monobob winner: (Slovakia) Viktória Čerňanská
  - Junior Skeleton winners: (Russia) Evgeniy Rukosuev (m) / (Germany) Susanne Kreher (f)
  - U20 Skeleton winners: (Germany) Lukas David Nydegger (m) / (Russia) Anastasiia Tsyganova (f)

=== 2021–22 Bobsleigh World Cup ===
- November 19 – 21, 2021: WC #1 in (Austria) Innsbruck #1
  - 2-man Bobsleigh winners: (Germany) Francesco Friedrich & Alexander Schüller
  - 2-woman Bobsleigh winners: (Germany) Laura Nolte & Leonie Fiebig
  - 4-man Bobsleigh winners: Germany (Francesco Friedrich, Alexander Schüller, Thorsten Margis, Candy Bauer)
- November 26 – 28, 2021: WC #2 in (Austria) Innsbruck #2
  - 2-man Bobsleigh winners: (Germany) Francesco Friedrich & Thorsten Margis
  - 2-woman Bobsleigh winners: (Germany) Laura Nolte & Deborah Levi
  - 4-man Bobsleigh winners: Germany (Francesco Friedrich, Alexander Schüller, Thorsten Margis, Martin Grothkopp)
- December 3 – 5, 2021: WC #3 in Altenberg #1
  - 2-man Bobsleigh winners: (Germany) Francesco Friedrich & Alexander Schüller
  - 2-woman Bobsleigh winners: (United States) Kaillie Humphries & Kaysha Love
  - 4-man Bobsleigh winners: Germany (Francesco Friedrich, Alexander Schüller, Thorsten Margis, Candy Bauer)
- December 10 – 12, 2021: WC #4 in Winterberg #1
  - 2-woman Bobsleigh winners: (Germany) Laura Nolte & Deborah Levi
  - 4-man Bobsleigh winners: Germany (Francesco Friedrich, Alexander Schüller, Thorsten Margis, Martin Grothkopp) (1st) / Germany (Francesco Friedrich, Alexander Schüller, Thorsten Margis, Candy Bauer) (2nd)
- December 17 – 19, 2021: WC #5 in Altenberg #2
  - 2-man Bobsleigh winners: (Germany) Francesco Friedrich & Thorsten Margis
  - 2-woman Bobsleigh winners: (Germany) Kim Kalicki & Lisa Buckwitz
  - 4-man Bobsleigh winners: Germany (Francesco Friedrich, Thorsten Margis, Martin Grothkopp, Alexander Schüller)
- December 31, 2021 – January 2: WC #6 in (Latvia) Sigulda
  - 2-man Bobsleigh winners: (Russia) Rostislav Gaitiukevich & Mikhail Mordasov (1st) / (Germany) Francesco Friedrich & Thorsten Margis (2nd)
  - 2-woman Bobsleigh winners: (United States) Elana Meyers Taylor & Lake Kwaza
- January 7 – 9: WC #7 in Winterberg #2
  - 2-man Bobsleigh winners: (Germany) Francesco Friedrich & Alexander Schüller
  - 2-woman Bobsleigh winners: (Germany) Laura Nolte & Deborah Levi
  - 4-man Bobsleigh winners: Germany (Francesco Friedrich, Alexander Schüller, Candy Bauer, Thorsten Margis)
- January 14 – 16: WC #8 in (Switzerland) St. Moritz
  - 2-man Bobsleigh winners: (Germany) Francesco Friedrich & Thorsten Margis
  - 2-woman Bobsleigh winners: (Germany) Kim Kalicki & Lisa Buckwitz
  - 4-man Bobsleigh winners: Latvia (Oskars Ķibermanis, Dāvis Spriņģis, Matīss Miknis, Edgars Nemme)
- 2-man Bobsleigh World Cup winner: (Germany) Francesco Friedrich
- 4-man Bobsleigh World Cup winner: (Germany) Francesco Friedrich
- 2-woman Bobsleigh World Cup winner: (United States) Elana Meyers Taylor

=== 2021–22 IBSF Women's Monobob World Series ===
- November 7–9, 2021: World Series #1 in (Canada) Whistler
  - Winner: (Canada) Alysia Rissling (3 times)
- November 11 & 12, 2021: World Series #2 in (Norway) Lillehammer
  - Winner: (Germany) Stephanie Schneider (2 times)
- November 20, 2021: World Series #3 in (Austria) Innsbruck
  - Winner: (United States) Elana Meyers Taylor
- November 23 & 24, 2021: World Series #4 in (United States) Park City
  - Winner: (Canada) Alysia Rissling (2 times)
- November 26, 2021: World Series #5 in (Germany) Altenberg
  - Winner: (Germany) Lisa Buckwitz
- November 27, 2021: World Series #6 in (Austria) Innsbruck
  - Winner: (United States) Elana Meyers Taylor
- December 3, 2021: World Series #7 in (Germany) Winterberg
  - Winner: (Australia) Breeana Walker
- December 4, 2021: World Series #8 in (Germany) Altenberg
  - Winner: (United States) Kaillie Humphries
- December 11, 2021: World Series #9 in (Latvia) Sigulda
  - Winner: (South Korea) Kim Yoo-ran
- December 11, 2021: World Series #10 in (Germany) Winterberg
  - Winner: (United States) Elana Meyers Taylor
- December 13 – 15, 2021: World Series #11 in (United States) Lake Placid
  - Winner: (Canada) Alysia Rissling (3 times)
- December 18, 2021: World Series #12 in (Germany) Altenberg
  - Winner: (Canada) Christine de Bruin
- January 1: World Series #13 in (Latvia) Sigulda
  - Winner: (Canada) Christine de Bruin
- January 6 & 7: World Series #14 in (Austria) Innsbruck
  - Winners: (Germany) Stephanie Schneider (1st) / (France) Margot Boch (2nd)
- January 8: World Series #15 in (Germany) Winterberg
  - Winner: (United States) Elana Meyers Taylor
- January 14: World Series #16 in (Germany) Winterberg
  - Winner: (Nigeria) Simidele Adeagbo
- January 15: World Series #17 in (Switzerland) St. Moritz
  - Winner: (United States) Kaillie Humphries
- World Cup winner: (United States) Elana Meyers Taylor

=== 2021–22 Skeleton World Cup ===
- November 19, 2021: WC #1 in (Austria) Innsbruck #1
  - Men's winner: (Russia) Aleksandr Tretyakov
  - Women's winner: (Russia) Elena Nikitina
- November 26, 2021: WC #2 in (Austria) Innsbruck #2
  - Men's winners: (China) Geng Wenqiang, (Germany) Christopher Grotheer, (United Kingdom) Matt Weston (same time)
  - Women's winner: (Russia) Elena Nikitina
- December 3, 2021: WC #3 in (Germany) Altenberg #1
  - Men's winner: (Germany) Axel Jungk
  - Women's winner: (Germany) Tina Hermann
- December 10, 2021: WC #4 in (Germany) Winterberg #1
  - Men's winner: (Russia) Aleksandr Tretyakov
  - Women's winner: (Netherlands) Kimberley Bos
- December 17, 2021: WC #5 in (Germany) Altenberg #2
  - Men's winner: (Latvia) Martins Dukurs
  - Women's winner: (Germany) Tina Hermann
- December 31, 2021: WC #6 in (Latvia) Sigulda
  - Men's winner: (Latvia) Tomass Dukurs
  - Women's winner: (Austria) Janine Flock
- January 7: WC #7 in (Germany) Winterberg #2
  - Men's winner: (Latvia) Martins Dukurs
  - Women's winner: (Netherlands) Kimberley Bos
- January 14: WC #8 in (Switzerland) St. Moritz
  - Men's winner: (Latvia) Martins Dukurs
  - Women's winner: (Australia) Jaclyn Narracott
- World Cup winners: (Latvia) Martins Dukurs (m) / (Netherlands) Kimberley Bos (f)

=== 2021–22 Para Sport World Cup ===
- November 22 & 23, 2021: Para Sport WC #1 in (United States) Lake Placid
  - Men's Para Bobsleigh winners: (United States) Robert Balk (1st) / (Spain) Israel Blanco (2nd)
- December 5 & 6, 2021: Para Sport WC #2 in (United States) Park City
  - Here 1st Para Bobsleigh competition is cancelled.
  - Men's Para Bobsleigh #2 winner: (United States) Robert Balk

=== 2021–22 IBSF Intercontinental Cup ===
- November 13 & 14, 2021: Intercontinental Cup #1 in (Canada) Whistler
  - Men's Skeleton winner: (Russia) Evgeniy Rukosuev (2 times)
  - Women's Skeleton winners: (Germany) Sophia Griebel (1st) / (Brazil) Nicole Rocha Silveira (2nd)
- November 23 & 24, 2021: Intercontinental Cup #2 in (United States) Park City
  - Men's Skeleton winners: (Germany) Felix Keisinger (1st) / (Germany) Lukas Nydegger (2nd)
  - Women's Skeleton winner: (Germany) Susanne Kreher (2 times)
- December 3 & 4, 2021: Intercontinental Cup #3 in (Austria) Innsbruck
  - Men's Skeleton winners: (China) Zheng Yin
  - Women's Skeleton winner: (China) Zhao Dan
- December 13, 2021: Intercontinental Cup #4 in (Latvia) Sigulda
  - Winners: (Russia) Evgeniy Rukosuev (m) / (Germany) Susanne Kreher (f)
- January 5 & 6: Intercontinental Cup #5 in (Germany) Altenberg
  - Men's Skeleton winners: (Russia) Evgeniy Rukosuev (1st) / (Germany) Felix Seibel (2nd)
  - Women's Skeleton winner: (Germany) Susanne Kreher (2 times)

=== 2021–22 IBSF Bobsleigh European Cup ===
- November 11–14, 2021: EC #1 in (Norway) Lillehammer
  - 2-man Bobsleigh winners: (Czech Republic) Adam Dobeš / Dominik Záleský (1st) / (Germany) Richard Oelsner / Georg Fleischhauer (2nd)
  - 2-woman Bobsleigh winners: (Germany) Stephanie Schneider & Claudia Schüßler (1st) / (Germany) Lisa Buckwitz & Marijana Herrmann (2nd)
  - 4-man Bobsleigh winners: (Russia) (Aleksey Stulnev, Vladislav Zharovtsev, Dmitriy Zakhryapin, Kirill Antyukh) (2 times)
- November 26 & 27, 2021: EC #2 in Altenberg
  - 2-man Bobsleigh winners: (Germany) Richard Oelsner & Georg Fleischhauer
  - 2-woman Bobsleigh winners: (Germany) Lisa Buckwitz & Vanessa Mark
  - 4-man Bobsleigh winners: Germany (Richard Oelsner, Bastian Heber, Henrik Bosse, Georg Fleischhauer)
- December 3–5, 2021: EC #3 in (Germany) Winterberg
  - 2-man Bobsleigh winners: (Germany) Maximilian Illmann & Philipp Wobeto
  - 2-woman Bobsleigh winners: (Germany) Stephanie Schneider & Theresa Leitz (2 times)
  - 4-man Bobsleigh winners: (Russia) (Aleksey Stulnev, Vladislav Zharovtsev, Dmitriy Zakhryapin, Kirill Antyukh) (2 times)
- December 11 & 12, 2021: EC #4 in (Latvia) Sigulda
  - 2-man Bobsleigh winners: (Germany) Richard Oelsner & Henrik Bosse (1st) / (Germany) Richard Oelsner & Georg Fleischhauer (2nd)
  - 2-woman Bobsleigh winners: (Germany) Stephanie Schneider & Claudia Schüßler
- January 6 – 8: EC #5 in (Austria) Innsbruck
  - 2-man Bobsleigh winners: (Germany) Richard Oelsner & Georg Fleischhauer
  - 2-woman Bobsleigh winners: (Germany) Maureen Zimmer & Neele Schuten
  - 4-man Bobsleigh winners: Germany (Jonas Jannusch, Felix Dahms, Benedikt Hertel, Christian Röder) (1st) / Italy (Patrick Baumgartner, Lorenzo Bilotti, Alex Verginer, Eric Fantazzini) (2nd)
- January 14 – 16: EC #6 in Winterberg (final)
  - 2-man Bobsleigh winners: (Germany) Richard Oelsner & Henrik Bosse
  - 2-woman Bobsleigh winners: (Germany) Stephanie Schneider & Tamara Seer
  - 4-man Bobsleigh winners: Germany (Nico Semmler, Oliver Peschk, Rupert Schenk, Marvin Paul)

=== 2021–22 IBSF Skeleton European Cup ===
- November 12 & 13, 2021: EC #1 in (Norway) Lillehammer
  - Men's winner: (China) Zheng Yin (2 times)
  - Women's winner: (China) Li Yuxi (2 times)
- November 19 & 20, 2021: EC #2 in (Germany) Winterberg
  - Men's winner: (China) Zheng Yin (2 times)
  - Women's winner: (China) Li Yuxi (2 times)
- December 3, 2021: EC #3 in (Austria) Innsbruck
  - Winners: (Germany) Stefan Röttig (m) / (United States) Mystique Ro (f)
- December 13 & 14, 2021: EC #4 in (Latvia) Sigulda
  - Men's winner: (Russia) Dmitrii Grevtsev (2 times)
  - Women's winner (Russia) Polina Tiurina (2 times)
- January 9 –: EC #5 in (Germany) Altenberg
  - Winners: (Germany) Stefan Röttig (m) / (France) Agathe Bessard (f)

=== 2021–22 IBSF Bobsleigh North American Cup ===
- November 7–9, 2021: NAC #1 in (Canada) Whistler
  - 2-man Bobsleigh winners: (Canada) Taylor Austin / Daniel Sunderland (2 times) / (Canada) Taylor Austin / Chris Patrician
- November 12–14, 2021: NAC #2 in (Canada) Whistler
  - 2-woman Bobsleigh winners: (Canada) Alysia Rissling / Wilson Eden (3 times)
  - 4-man Bobsleigh winners: (Canada) (Taylor Austin, Chris Patrician, Shaquille Murray-Lawrence, Daniel Sunderland) (3 times)
- November 27–29, 2021: NAC #3 in Park City
  - 2-man Bobsleigh winners: (United States) Frank Delduca & Boone Niederhofer (1st) / (United States) Frank Delduca & Kyle Wilcox
  - 2-woman Bobsleigh winners: (United States) Brittany Reinbolt & Nicole Brungardt (2 times)
  - 4-man Bobsleigh winners: United States (Frank Delduca, Adrian Adams, Kyle Wilcox, Boone Niederhofer) (1st) / Canada (Taylor Austin, Shaquille Murray-Lawrence, Mark Mlakar, Chris Patrician) (2nd)
- December 13 – 20, 2021: NAC #4 & #5 in Lake Placid
  - 2-man Bobsleigh winners: (United States) Frank Delduca & Kyle Wilcox (1st) / (United States) Frank Delduca & Boone Niederhofer (2nd) / (United States) Frank Delduca & Manteo Mitchell (3rd)
  - 2-woman Bobsleigh winners: (United States) Nicole Vogt & Jasmine Jones (1st) / (United States) Nicole Vogt & Nicole Brungardt (2nd) / (United States) Nicole Vogt & Emily Renna (3rd)
  - 4-man Bobsleigh winners: (Canada) (Taylor Austin, Chris Patrician, Shaquille Murray-Lawrence, Daniel Sunderland) (2 times) / United States (Frank Delduca, Adrian Adams, Kyle Wilcox, Boone Niederhofer) (2nd)

=== 2021–22 IBSF Skeleton North American Cup ===
- November 7–9, 2021: NAC #1 in (Canada) Whistler
  - Men's winners: (Austria) Alexander Schlintner (2 times) / (Canada) Evan Neufeldt
  - Women's winner: (Brazil) Nicole Rocha Silveira (3 times)
- November 19 & 20, 2021: NAC #2 in (United States) Park City
  - Men's winner: (Germany) Felix Seibel (2 times)
  - Women's winner: (Brazil) Nicole Rocha Silveira (2 times)
- December 13 – 15, 2021: NAC #3 & #4 in (United States) Lake Placid
  - Men's winners: (Spain) Ander Mirambell (1st) / (Australia) Nicholas Timmings (2 times)
  - Women's winner: (South Korea) Kim Eun-ji (3 times)

== Boccia ==
- December 3 – 14: 2022 World Boccia Championships in (Brazil) Rio de Janeiro

=== 2022 World Boccia Cup ===
- April 25 – May 1: WC #1 in (Canada) Montreal
- July 4 – 11: WC #2 in (Portugal) Póvoa de Varzim
- August 8 – 16: WC #3 in (Chinese Taipei) Taipei

=== 2022 World Boccia Intercontinental Challenger ===
- April 2 – 10: Challenger #1 in (Croatia) Zagreb
- August 1 – 7: Challenger #2 in (Netherlands) Veldhoven
- August 22 – 29: Challenger #3 in (Poland) Poznań
- September 6 – 14: Challenger #4 in (Italy) Olbia

== Bodybuilding ==
- September 2 – 4: 2022 IFBB World Fit Model Championships in Ukraine
- October 13 – 17: 2022 IFBB World Fitness Championships in (South Korea) Yeongju
- November 3 – 7: 2022 IFBB World Bodybuilding and Fitness Championships

== Boules ==
- May 12 – 15: 2022 Pétanque World Championships in (Denmark) Karlslunde
  - Women 1x1: (Switzerland) Sylviane Métairon def. (Norway) Ranu Homniam, 13–10.
  - Men 1x1: (Spain) Jesús Escacho def. (Italy) Diego Rizzi, 13–8.
  - Women 2x2: (Spain) Aurelia Blazquez & Sara Díaz def. (Malaysia) Nur Thahira Tasnim & Nur Ain Syuhada, 13–2.
  - Men 2x2: (Italy) Diego Rizzi & Alessio Cocciolo def. (Switzerland) Maiky Molinas & Joseph Molinas, 13–1.
  - Mix 2x2: (Thailand) Sarawut Sriboonpeng & Nantawan Fueangsanit def. (Spain) Sara Díaz & Javier Cardeñas, 13–4.

== Bowls ==
- January 7 – 23: 2022 World Indoor Bowls Championship in (England) Great Yarmouth
  - Open pairs: (Scotland) Stewart Anderson & (Scotland) Darren Burnett def. (England) Mark Dawes & (England) Jamie Chestney, 9–6, 7–11, 2–0.
  - Mixed pairs: (Guernsey) Alison Merrien & (Scotland) Paul Foster def. (Northern Ireland) Sandra Bailie & (England) Mark Dawes, 8–10, 9–6, 2–0.
  - Women's singles: (England) Katherine Rednall def. (Guernsey) Alison Merrien, 13–2, 14–2.
  - Men's singles: (England) Les Gillett def. (Scotland) Paul Foster, 8–7, 4–12, 1–2.

== Boxing ==
- January 20 – 30: ASBC Asian U22 Boxing Championships in (Uzbekistan) Tashkent
  - Minimumweight winners: (Uzbekistan) Asilbek Jalilov (m) / (Uzbekistan) Farzona Fozilova (f)
  - Women's Light Flyweight winner: (Uzbekistan) Sabina Bobokulova
  - Flyweight winners: (Uzbekistan) Mukhammadkodir Mamirjonov (m) / (Uzbekistan) Feruza Kazakova (f)
  - Bantamweight winners: (Uzbekistan) Shakhzod Muzafarov (m) / (Mongolia) Enkhjargal Munguntsetseg (f)
  - Featherweight winners: (Uzbekistan) Dilshod Abdumurodov (m) / (Japan) Sena Irie (f)
  - Lightweight winners: (Uzbekistan) Khurshidbek Rasuljonov (m) / (Mongolia) Badmaarag Ganzong (f)
  - Light Welterweight winners: (Uzbekistan) Ruslan Abdullaev (m) / (Uzbekistan) Mokhinabonu Abdullaeva (f)
  - Men's Welterweight winner: (Uzbekistan) Javlonbek Yuldashev
  - Men's Light Middleweight winner: (Uzbekistan) Aziz Tojiev
  - Men's Middleweight winner: (Uzbekistan) Abdulaziz Abdupattaev
  - Men's Light Heavyweight winner: (Uzbekistan) Jasurbek Yuldoshev
  - Men's Cruiserweight winner: (Uzbekistan) Timur Merjanov
  - Men's Heavyweight winner: (Tajikistan) Davlat Boltaev
  - Men's Super Heavyweight winner: (Uzbekistan) Jakhongir Zokirov
- May 8 – 20: 2022 IBA Women's World Boxing Championships in (Turkey) Istanbul
- March 22 – April 2: AMBC American Boxing Championships in (Ecuador) Guayaquil
- September 29 – October 9: 2022 FISU University World Cup Combat Sports in (Russia) Ekaterinburg
- November: 2022 AIBA Youth World Boxing Championships in (Spain) Alicante

== Bridge ==
- March 27 – April 9: 2021 World Bridge Team Championships in (Italy) Salsomaggiore Terme
- September 2 – 17: 2022 World Bridge Series in (Poland) Wrocław

== Canadian football ==
- June 9 – November 13: 2022 CFL season
  - November 20: 109th Grey Cup in (Saskatchewan) Regina – Toronto Argonauts 24, Winnipeg Blue Bombers 23
- August 27 – November 19: 2022 U Sports football season
  - November 26: 57th Vanier Cup in (Ontario) London – Laval 30, Saskatchewan 24

== Canoeing ==
- January 28 – 30: 2022 Oceania Canoe Slalom Championships in (Australia) Penrith
  - K1 winners: (Australia) Lucien Delfour (m) / (Australia) Jessica Fox (f)
  - C1 winners: (Australia) Tristan Carter (m) / (Australia) Jessica Fox (f)
- June 2 – 5: 2022 Wildwater Canoeing World Championships in (France) Treignac
- June 27 – July 2: 2022 Canoe Freestyle World Championships in (United Kingdom) Nottingham
- July 26 – 31: 2022 Canoe Slalom World Championships in (Germany) Augsburg
- August 3 – 7: 2022 Canoe Sprint World Championships in (Canada) Halifax
- August 16 – 21: 2022 Canoe Polo World Championships in (France) Saint-Omer
- September 22 – 25: 2022 ICF Dragon Boat World Championships in (Ukraine) Ternopil
- September 29 – October 2: 2022 Canoe Marathon World Championships in (Portugal) Ponte de Lima

== Casting ==
- August 31 – September 4: 2022 World Championship in Castingsport in (Estonia) Tallinn

== Cheerleading ==
- April 20 – 22: 2022 World Cheerleading Championships in (United States) Orlando

== Chess ==
- TBC: Women's Candidates Tournament 2022
- June: Candidates Tournament 2022
- July 26 – August 8: World Chess Olympiad 2022
- October 20 – 30: World Amateur Chess Championship 2022 in Malta
- November: World Team Chess Championship 2022

== Cricket ==
- October 5 – 10, 2021: 2021 Summer T20 Bash in United Arab Emirates
  - Two non-T20I twenty-over matches were also played, with Scotland beating Ireland by five wickets, and Namibia recording an 84 run victory over Papua New Guinea.
- January 14 – February 5: 2022 ICC Under-19 Cricket World Cup in West Indies
- January 18 – 24: 2022 Commonwealth Games Cricket Qualifier in Malaysia
- TBD for February: 2022 Uganda Cricket World Cup Challenge League B in Uganda
- March 4 – April 3: 2022 Women's Cricket World Cup in New Zealand
- October 16 – November 13: 2022 ICC Men's T20 World Cup in Australia

=== 2021–2023 ICC World Test Championship – Test series ===
- November 17 – December 7, 2021: New Zealand cricket team in India in 2021–22 in Mumbai
  - India win the Test series 1–0.
- November 21 – December 3, 2021: West Indian cricket team in Sri Lanka in 2021–22 in Galle
  - Sri Lanka won the 2-match series 2–0.
- November 26 – December 8, 2021: Pakistani cricket team in Bangladesh in 2021–22 in Dhaka
  - Pakistan win the Test series 2–0.
- December 8, 2021 – January 18: 2021–22 Ashes series in Brisbane, Adelaide, Melbourne, Sydney and Hobart
  - Australia successfully retained the Ashes by winning the first three Test matches.
- December 26, 2021 – January 15: Indian cricket team in South Africa in 2021–22 in Centurion, Johannesburg and Cape Town
  - South Africa won the 3-match series 2–1.
- January 1 – 15: Bangladeshi cricket team in New Zealand in 2021–22 in Tauranga and Christchurch
  - 2-match series drawn 1–1.
- February 17 – March 1: South African cricket team in New Zealand in 2021–22 in Christchurch and Wellington
  - 2-match series drawn 1–1.
- February 25 – March 9: Sri Lankan cricket team in India in 2021–22 in Bangalore and Mohali
  - India won the 2-match series 2–0.
- March 3 – 25: Australian cricket team in Pakistan in 2021–22 in Karachi, Rawalpindi and Lahore
  - Australia won the 3-match series 1–0.
- March 8 – 28: English cricket team in the West Indies in 2021–22 in Antigua and Barbuda, Barbados and Grenada
  - West Indies won the 3-match series 1–0.
- March 30 – April 11: Bangladeshi cricket team in South Africa in 2021–22 in TBD

=== 2020–2023 ICC Cricket World Cup Super League – ODI series ===
- September 1 – 5, 2021: Afghan cricket team in Pakistan in 2021–22 in Kabul
  - The tour was postponed due to the situation in Afghanistan, the logistics in travelling, and for the welfare of the team.
- September 2 – 7, 2021: South African cricket team in Sri Lanka in 2021–22 in Colombo
  - Sri Lanka won the 3-match series 2–1.
- November 26 – December 1, 2021: Dutch cricket team in South Africa in 2021–22 in Centurion
  - The second and third ODIs were postponed due to the COVID-19 pandemic.
- December 18 – 22, 2021: West Indian cricket team in Pakistan in 2021–22 in Karachi
  - The ODI matches were postponed following multiple cases of COVID-19 the West Indies team and support staff.
- January 8 – 14: Irish cricket team in the West Indies in 2021–22 in (Jamaica) Kingston
  - Ireland won the 3-match series 2–1.
- January 16 – 21: Zimbabwean cricket team in Sri Lanka in 2021–22 in Kandy
  - Sri Lanka won the 3-match series 2–1.
- January 21 – 25: Dutch cricket team against Afghanistan in Qatar in 2021–22 in Doha
  - Afghanistan won the 3-match series 3–0.
- January 30 – February 5: New Zealand cricket team in Australia in 2021–22 in Perth, Hobart and Sydney
  - Postponed.
- February 6 – 12: West Indian cricket team in India in 2021–22 in Ahmedabad, Jaipur and Kolkata
  - India won the 3-match series 3–0.
- March 18 – 23: Bangladeshi cricket team in South Africa in 2021–22 in TBD
  - Bangladesh won the 3-match series 2–1.
- March 29 – April 2: Australian cricket team in Pakistan in 2021–22 in Lahore
  - Pakistan won the 3-match series 2–1.
- March 29 – April 4: Dutch cricket team in New Zealand in 2021–22 in Dunedin and Hamilton
  - New Zealand won the 3-match series 3–0.
- TBD: Afghan cricket team in Zimbabwe in 2021–22 in TBD location
- TBD: Afghan cricket team in Bangladesh in 2021–22 in TBD location
- TBD: Afghan cricket team in India in 2021–22 in TBD location

=== 2019–2023 ICC Cricket World Cup League 2 – Tri-series ===
- September 13 – 20, 2021: 2021 Oman Tri-Nation Series (round 6) in Muscat
  - Of the six matches that were played, host Oman won three of their fixtures, with Nepal winning two matches and the United States winning one.
- September 25 – October 2, 2021: 2021 Oman Tri-Nation Series (round 7) in Muscat
  - Scotland won their first three matches, with Oman winning two of their fixtures, and Papua New Guinea remaining winless in the Cricket World Cup League 2 tournament. The sixth and final match of the series, between Oman and Scotland, was abandoned mid-way through Scotland's innings due to heavy rain caused by Cyclone Shaheen.
- November 26 – December 6, 2021: 2021 Namibia Tri-Nation Series in Windhoek
  - The series was called off after the first two matches due to the COVID-19 pandemic.
- TBD for February: 2022 Nepal Tri-Nation Series in Nepal
- TBD for March: 2022 Namibia Tri-Nation Series (March) in Windhoek
- TBD: 2021 United Arab Emirates Tri-Nation Series in TBD

== Cue sports ==
=== Carom billiards ===
- March 10 – 13: 2022 UMB World Three-cushion Championship for National Teams in (Germany) Viersen
  - Winner: Turkey, Runner-up: Colombia
- March 15 – 20: 2022 UMB World Five-pins Championship in (Italy) Calangianus
- September 20 – 22: 2022 UMB World Three-cushion Championship for Ladies in Netherlands
- November 9 – 13: 2022 UMB World Three-cushion Championship in South Korea

=== Pool ===
- March 2 – 12: 2022 European Pool Championships in (Slovenia) Laško
- March 28 – April 1: 2022 WPA World Ten-ball Championship in (United States) Las Vegas
  - Winner: (Poland) Wojciech Szewczyk, Runner-up: (Peru) Christopher Tévez
- July 25 – August 1: 2022 Youth European Pool Championships in (Bulgaria) Petrich
- September 6 – 11: 2022 WPA World Teams Ten-ball Championship in (Austria) Klagenfurt
- September 6 – 11: 2022 WPA World Women's Ten-ball Championship in (Austria) Klagenfurt
- November 30 – December 3: 2022 Mosconi Cup in (United States) Las Vegas

==== 2022 Euro Tour ====
- February 26 – 28: Laško Open in (Slovenia) Laško
  - Winner: (Poland) Wiktor Zieliński, Runner-up: (Germany) Joshua Filler
- April 29 – May 2: Treviso Open in Italy
- June 24 – 27: St. Johann im Pongau Open in Austria
- August 6 – 8: Petrich Open in Bulgaria

==== 2022 US Pro Billiard Series ====
- January 11 – 16: Arizona Open in (United States) Tucson
  - Winner: (Russia) Fedor Gorst, Runner-up: (Philippines) Roland Garcia
- February 9 – 12: Wisconsin Open in (United States) Baraboo
  - Winner: (Greece) Alex Kazakis, Runner-up: (Kuwait) Bader Alawadhi
- March 23 – 26: Las Vegas Open in (United States) Las Vegas
  - Winner: (Singapore) Aloysius Yapp, Runner-up: (Poland) Wojciech Szewczyk
- September 21 – 24: Michigan Open in (United States) Battle Creek
- October 19 – 22: Ohio Open in (United States) Wilmington
- TBD: Puerto Rico Open in San Juan (final)

=== Snooker ===
- February 10 – 14: 2022 World Women's Snooker Championship in (England) Sheffield
  - Winner: (Thailand) Nutcharut Wongharuthai; runner-up: (Belgium) Wendy Jans
- April 16 – May 2: 2022 World Snooker Championship in (England) Sheffield
  - Winner: (England) Ronnie O'Sullivan; runner-up: (England) Judd Trump

== Curling ==
=== 2022 Winter Olympics ===
- February 2 – 20: Curling at the 2022 Winter Olympics in (China) Beijing
  - Men's final placements: (gold) Sweden, (silver) Great Britain, (bronze) Canada
  - Women's final placements: (gold) Great Britain, (silver) Japan, (bronze) Sweden
  - Mixed doubles final placements: (gold) Italy, (silver) Norway, (bronze) Sweden

=== 2022 Winter Paralympics ===
- March 5 – 12: Wheelchair curling at the 2022 Winter Paralympics in Beijing
  - Final placements: (gold) China, (silver) Sweden, (bronze) Canada

=== 2021–22 curling season ===
- March 19 – 27: 2022 World Women's Curling Championship in Prince George
  - Final placements: (gold) : Switzerland, (silver) : South Korea, (bronze) : Canada
- April 2 – 10: 2022 World Men's Curling Championship in (United States) Las Vegas
  - Final placements: (gold) : Sweden, (silver) : Canada, (bronze) : Italy
- April 23 – 30: 2022 World Senior Curling Championships in (Switzerland) Geneva
- April 23 – 30: 2022 World Mixed Doubles Curling Championship in Geneva
  - Final placements: (gold) : Scotland, (silver) : Switzerland, (bronze) : Germany
- May 1 – 6: 2022 European Curling Championships in (Lithuania) Vilnius
- May 15 – 22: 2022 World Junior Curling Championships in (Sweden) Jönköping

=== 2021–2022 Grand Slam of Curling ===
- October 19 – 24, 2021: Masters in (Ontario) Oakville
  - Men's: (Scotland) Bruce Mouat defeated (Ontario) Brad Jacobs, 7–5.
  - Women's: (Manitoba) Tracy Fleury defeated (Manitoba) Jennifer Jones, 9–7.
- November 2 – 7, 2021: BOOST National in (Alberta) Chestermere
  - Men's: (Newfoundland and Labrador) Brad Gushue defeated (Scotland) Bruce Mouat, 5–2.
  - Women's: (Sweden) Anna Hasselborg defeated (Manitoba) Tracy Fleury, 9–6.
- January 14 – 16: Meridian Open in (Alberta) Camrose
  - Cancelled.
- April 12 – 17: Princess Auto Players' Championship in (Ontario) Toronto
  - Men's: (Scotland) Bruce Mouat defeated (Sweden) Niklas Edin, 8–3
  - Women's: (Sweden) Anna Hasselborg defeated (Manitoba) Kerri Einarson, 6–5
- May 3 – 8: KIOTI Tractor Champions Cup in (Alberta) Olds
  - Men's: (Newfoundland and Labrador) Brad Gushue defeated (Alberta) Kevin Koe, 8–5
  - Women's: (Manitoba) Kerri Einarson defeated (South Korea) Gim Un-chi, 10–6

== Cycling — BMX ==
=== International BMX events ===
- July 26 – 31: 2022 UCI BMX World Championships in (France) Nantes

=== 2022 UCI BMX Racing World Cup ===
- May 28 & 29: #1 in (United Kingdom) Glasgow
  - Men's Elite winners: (Colombia) Diego Arboleda (Round 1) / (France) Jérémy Rencurel (Round 2)
  - Women's Elite winner: (Netherlands) Laura Smulders (Round 1 & 2)

=== 2022 UCI BMX Freestyle World Cup ===
- May 25 – 29: #1 in (France) Montpellier
  - Park winners: (Japan) Rim Nakamura (m) / (Colombia) Lizsurley Villegas (f)
  - Flatland winners: (Japan) Kio Hayakawa (m) / (Germany) Julia Preuss (f)

== Cycling — Cross ==
Continental and World Championships

- November 6 & 7, 2021: UEC European Cyclo-cross Championships in (Netherlands) Col du Vam
  - Elite winners: (Netherlands) Lars van der Haar (m) / (Netherlands) Lucinda Brand (f)
  - U23 winners: (Netherlands) Ryan Kamp (m) / (Netherlands) Shirin van Anrooij (f)
  - Juniors winners: (Belgium) Aaron Dockx (m) / (United Kingdom) Zoe Bäckstedt (f)
- December 3 & 4, 2021: UCI Masters Cyclo-cross World Championships in (United Kingdom) East Suffolk
  - Masters 33–39 winners: (United Kingdom) Graham Briggs (m) / (Germany) Cindy Törber (f)
  - Masters 40–44 winners: (United Kingdom) Lewis Craven (m) / (United Kingdom) Ceris Gilfillan (f)
  - Masters 45–49 winners: (United Kingdom) Adrian Lansley (m) / (United Kingdom) Kate Eedy (f)
  - Masters 50–54 winners: (Germany) Jens Schwedler (m) / (United Kingdom) Helen Pattinson (f)
  - Masters 55–59 winners: (United States) Murray Swanson (m) / (Netherlands) Corinne Piloot (f)
  - Masters 60–64 winners: (France) Jean Malot (m) / (United Kingdom) Nicola Davies (f)
  - Masters 65–69 winners: (United Kingdom) Peter Harris (m) / (United Kingdom) Lydia Gould
  - Men's Masters 70–74 winner: (Spain) Francisco Sánchez De Diego
  - Women's Masters 70+ winner: (United States) Maurine Sweeney
  - Men's Masters Open 75–79 winner: (United States) John Elgart
  - Men's Masters Open 80+ winner: (United Kingdom) John Ginley
- December 4 & 5, 2021: Pan American Cyclo-cross Championships in (United States) Garland
  - Elite winners: (United States) Eric Brunner (m) / (United States) Raylyn Nuss (f)
  - U23 winners: (United States) Scott Funston (m) / (United States) Madigan Munro (f)
  - Juniors winners: (United States) Jack Spranger (m) / (Canada) Ava Holmgren (f)
- January 29 & 30: 2022 UCI Cyclo-cross World Championships in (United States) Fayetteville
  - Elite winners: (United Kingdom) Tom Pidcock (m) / (Netherlands) Marianne Vos (f)
  - U23 winners: (Belgium) Joran Wyseure (m) / (Netherlands) Puck Pieterse (f)
  - Juniors winners: (Switzerland) Jan Christen (m) / (United Kingdom) Zoe Bäckstedt (f)

=== 2021–22 UCI Cyclo-cross World Cup ===
- October 10, 2021: WC #1 in (United States) Waterloo
  - Elite winners: (Belgium) Eli Iserbyt (m) / (Netherlands) Marianne Vos (f)
- October 13, 2021: WC #2 in (United States) Fayetteville
  - Elite winners: (Belgium) Quinten Hermans (m) / (Netherlands) Lucinda Brand (f)
- October 17, 2021: WC #3 in (United States) Iowa City
  - Elite winners: (Belgium) Eli Iserbyt (m) / (Netherlands) Marianne Vos (f)
- October 24, 2021: WC #4 in (Belgium) Zonhoven
  - Elite winners: (Belgium) Toon Aerts (m) / (Netherlands) Denise Betsema (f)
- October 31, 2021: WC #5 in (Belgium) Overijse
  - Elite winners: (Belgium) Eli Iserbyt (m) / (Hungary) Kata Blanka Vas (f)
  - Juniors winner: (Netherlands) David Haverdings
- November 14, 2021: WC #6 in (Czech Republic) Tábor
  - Elite winners: (Netherlands) Lars van der Haar (m) / (Netherlands) Lucinda Brand (f)
  - U23 winner: (Netherlands) Mees Hendrikx
  - Juniors winners: (Netherlands) David Haverdings (m) / (United Kingdom) Zoe Bäckstedt (f)
- November 21, 2021: WC #7 in (Belgium) Koksijde
  - Elite winners: (Belgium) Eli Iserbyt (m) / (Netherlands) Annemarie Worst (f)
- November 28, 2021: WC #8 in (France) Besançon
  - Elite winners: (Belgium) Eli Iserbyt (m) / (Netherlands) Lucinda Brand (f)
- December 5, 2021: WC #9 in (Belgium) Antwerpen
  - Cancelled.
- December 12, 2021: WC #10 in (Italy) Val di Sole
  - Elite winners: (Belgium) Wout van Aert (m) / (Netherlands) Fem van Empel (f)
- December 18, 2021: WC #11 in (Netherlands) Rucphen
  - Elite winners: (United Kingdom) Tom Pidcock (m) / (Netherlands) Marianne Vos (f)
- December 19, 2021: WC #12 in (Belgium) Namur
  - Elite winners: (Belgium) Michael Vanthourenhout (m) / (Netherlands) Lucinda Brand (f)
  - U23 winner: (Netherlands) Pim Ronhaar
  - Juniors winners: (Netherlands) David Haverdings (m) / (United Kingdom) Zoe Bäckstedt (f)
- December 26, 2021: WC #13 in (Belgium) Dendermonde
  - Elite winners: (Belgium) Wout van Aert (m) / (Netherlands) Lucinda Brand (f)
  - U23 winner: (United Kingdom) Cameron Mason
  - Juniors winners: (Netherlands) David Haverdings (m) / (United Kingdom) Zoe Bäckstedt (f)
- January 2: WC #14 in (Netherlands) Hulst
  - Elite winners: (United Kingdom) Tom Pidcock (m) / (Netherlands) Lucinda Brand (f)
- January 16: WC #15 in (France) Flamanville
  - Elite winners: (Belgium) Eli Iserbyt (m) / (Netherlands) Fem van Empel (f)
  - U23 winner: (Belgium) Emiel Verstrynge
  - Juniors winners: (Netherlands) David Haverdings (m) / (Netherlands) Leonie Bentveld (f)
- January 23: WC #16 in (Netherlands) Hoogerheide (final)
  - Elite winners: (Belgium) Eli Iserbyt (m) / (Netherlands) Marianne Vos (f)
- Elite World Cup winners: (Belgium) Eli Iserbyt (m) / (Netherlands) Lucinda Brand (f)

=== 2021-2022 Cyclo-cross Superprestige ===
- October 3, 2021: Superprestige #1 in (Netherlands) Gieten
  - Elite winners: (Belgium) Toon Aerts (m) / (Netherlands) Lucinda Brand (f)
  - Juniors winners: (Netherlands) David Haverdings (m) / (United Kingdom) Zoe Bäckstedt (f)
- October 23, 2021: Superprestige #2 in (Belgium) Ruddervoorde
  - Elite winners: (Belgium) Eli Iserbyt (m) / (Netherlands) Denise Betsema (f)
  - Juniors winner: (Netherlands) David Haverdings
- November 11, 2021: Superprestige #3 in (Belgium) Niel
  - Elite winners: (Belgium) Eli Iserbyt (m) / (Netherlands) Lucinda Brand (f)
  - Juniors winner: (Belgium) Senne Bauwens
- November 20, 2021: Superprestige #4 in (Belgium) Merksplas
  - Elite winners: (Belgium) Eli Iserbyt (m) / (Netherlands) Lucinda Brand (f)
  - Juniors winner: (Netherlands) David Haverdings
- December 4, 2021: Superprestige #5 in (Belgium) Boom
  - Elite winners: (Belgium) Wout van Aert (m) / (Netherlands) Lucinda Brand (f)
  - Juniors winner: (Belgium) Yordi Corsus
- December 27, 2021: Superprestige #6 in (Belgium) Heusden-Zolder
  - Elite winners: (Belgium) Wout van Aert (m) / (Netherlands) Lucinda Brand (f)
  - Juniors winner: (Netherlands) David Haverdings
- December 29, 2021: Superprestige #7 in (Belgium) Diegem
  - Cancelled.
- February 12: Superprestige #8 in (Belgium) Gavere (final)
  - Elite winners: (Netherlands) Lars van der Haar (m) / (Netherlands) Lucinda Brand (f)
  - Juniors winner: (Netherlands) David Haverdings

=== X²O Badkamers Trofee 2021–2022 ===
- November 1, 2021: X²O Badkamers Trofee #1 in (Belgium) Audenarde
  - Elite winners: (Belgium) Eli Iserbyt (m) / (United States) Clara Honsinger (f)
  - U23 winner: (Netherlands) Pim Ronhaar
  - Juniors winner: (Belgium) Aaron Dockx
- November 27, 2021: X²O Badkamers Trofee #2 in (Belgium) Kortrijk
  - Elite winners: (Belgium) Toon Aerts (m) / (Netherlands) Lucinda Brand (f)
  - U23 winner: (Netherlands) Pim Ronhaar
  - Juniors winner: (Belgium) Kenay De Moyer
- December 30, 2021: X²O Badkamers Trofee #3 in (Belgium) Wuustwezel
  - Elite winners: (Belgium) Wout van Aert (m) / (Netherlands) Lucinda Brand (f)
  - U23 winner: (Belgium) Thibau Nys
  - Juniors winners: (Belgium) Kenay De Moyer (m) / (Netherlands) Leonie Bentveld (f)
- January 1: X²O Badkamers Trofee #4 in (Belgium) Baal
  - Elite winners: (Belgium) Wout van Aert (m) / (Netherlands) Lucinda Brand (f)
  - U23 winner: (Belgium) Thibau Nys
  - Juniors winners: (Netherlands) David Haverdings (m) / (Netherlands) Leonie Bentveld (f)
- January 5: X²O Badkamers Trofee #5 in (Belgium) Herentals
  - Elite winners: (Belgium) Wout van Aert (m) / (Netherlands) Lucinda Brand (f)
  - U23 winner: (Belgium) Thibau Nys
  - Juniors winners: (Netherlands) David Haverdings (m) / (Netherlands) Leonie Bentveld (f)
- January 22: X²O Badkamers Trofee #6 in (Belgium) Hamme
  - Elite winners: (Belgium) Laurens Sweeck (m) / (Netherlands) Lucinda Brand (f)
  - U23 winner: (Belgium) Joran Wyseure
  - Men's Juniors winner: (Netherlands) David Haverdings
- February 6: X²O Badkamers Trofee #7 in (Belgium) Lille
  - Elite winners: (Belgium) Toon Aerts (m) / (Netherlands) Lucinda Brand (f)
  - U23 winner: (Netherlands) Pim Ronhaar
  - Juniors winners: (Belgium) Yordi Corsus (m) / (United Kingdom) Zoe Bäckstedt
- February 13: X²O Badkamers Trofee #8 in (Belgium) Brussels (final)
  - Elite winners: (Belgium) Michael Vanthourenhout (m) / (Netherlands) Denise Betsema (f)
  - U23 winner: (Netherlands) Pim Ronhaar
  - Men's Juniors winner: (Netherlands) David Haverdings

=== Toi Toi Cup 2021–2022 ===
- September 28, 2021: Toi Toi Cup #1 in (Czech Republic) Mladá Boleslav
  - Elite winners: (Czech Republic) Michael Boroš (m) / (Czech Republic) Pavla Havlíková (f)
  - Juniors winners: (Czech Republic) Václav Ježek (m) / (Czech Republic) Eliška Hanáková (f)
- October 2, 2021: Toi Toi Cup #2 in (Czech Republic) Hlinsko
  - Elite winners: (Poland) Marek Konwa (m) / (Czech Republic) Kristýna Zemanová (f)
  - Juniors winners: (Czech Republic) Václav Ježek (m) / (Czech Republic) Vanda Dlasková (f)
- October 9, 2021: Toi Toi Cup #3 in (Czech Republic) Slaný
  - Elite winners: (Czech Republic) Michael Boroš (m) / (Czech Republic) Kristýna Zemanová (f)
  - Juniors winners: (Czech Republic) Václav Ježek (m) / (Czech Republic) Eliška Hanáková (f)
- October 16, 2021: Toi Toi Cup #4 in (Czech Republic) Rýmařov
  - Elite winners: (Czech Republic) Michael Boroš (m) / (Czech Republic) Kristýna Zemanová (f)
  - Juniors winners: (Czech Republic) Ondřej Novotný (m) / (Czech Republic) Eliška Hanáková (f)
- November 17, 2021: Toi Toi Cup #5 in (Czech Republic) Veselí nad Lužnicí
  - Elite winners: (Czech Republic) Michael Boroš (m) / (Czech Republic) Kristýna Zemanová (f)
  - Juniors winners: (Czech Republic) Adam Seeman (m) / (Netherlands) Leonie Bentveld (f)
- December 11, 2021: Toi Toi Cup #6 in (Czech Republic) Jičín (final)
  - Elite winners: (Czech Republic) Michael Boroš (m) / (Germany) Judith Krahl (f)

=== Ethias Cross 2021–2022 ===
- September 11, 2021: Ethias Cross #1 in (Belgium) Lokeren
  - Elite winners: (Belgium) Eli Iserbyt (m) / (Netherlands) Denise Betsema (f)
  - Juniors winner: (Belgium) Yordi Corsus
- September 18, 2021: Ethias Cross #2 in (Belgium) Beringen
  - Elite winners: (Belgium) Eli Iserbyt (m) / (Netherlands) Yara Kastelijn (f)
  - Juniors winner: (Belgium) Aaron Dockx
- September 18, 2021: Ethias Cross #3 in (Belgium) Bredene
  - Elite winners: (Belgium) Eli Iserbyt (m) / (Netherlands) Denise Betsema (f)
  - Juniors winner: (Belgium) Aaron Dockx
- October 2, 2021: Ethias Cross #4 in (Belgium) Meulebeke
  - Elite winners: (Belgium) Michael Vanthourenhout (m) / (Belgium) Sanne Cant (f)
  - Juniors winner: (Belgium) Kenay De Moyer
- November 13, 2021: Ethias Cross #5 in (Belgium) Leuven
  - Elite winners: (Belgium) Laurens Sweeck (m) / (United Kingdom) Anna Kay (f)
  - Juniors winner: (Belgium) Robby Dhondt
- December 11, 2021: Ethias Cross #6 in (Belgium) Essen
  - Elite winners: (Belgium) Wout Van Aert (m) / (United Kingdom) Zoe Bäckstedt (f)
  - Juniors winner: (Netherlands) David Haverdings
- February 5: Ethias Cross #7 in (Belgium) Kruibeke
  - Cancelled.
- February 5: Ethias Cross #7 in (Belgium) Maldegem
  - Elite winners: (Belgium) Laurens Sweeck (m) / (Netherlands) Annemarie Worst (f)
  - Juniors winner: (Belgium) Kenay De Moyer
- February 19: Ethias Cross #8 in (Belgium) Sint-Niklaas (final)
  - Elite winners: (Belgium) Michael Vanthourenhout (m) / (Netherlands) Lucinda Brand (f)
  - Juniors winner: (Netherlands) David Haverdings

=== National Trophy Series 2021–2022 ===
- September 19, 2021: National Trophy Series #1 in (United Kingdom) Derby
  - Elite winners: (United Kingdom) Lewis Askey (m) / (United Kingdom) Amira Mellor (f)
  - Juniors winners: (United Kingdom) Callum Laborde (m) / (United Kingdom) Ella MacLean-Howell (f)
- October 10, 2021: National Trophy Series #2 in (United Kingdom) Milnthorpe
  - Elite winners: (United Kingdom) Joseph Blackmore (m) / (United Kingdom) Amira Mellor (f)
  - Juniors winners: (United Kingdom) Nathan Smith (m) / (United Kingdom) Ella MacLean-Howell (f)
- October 24, 2021: National Trophy Series #3 in (United Kingdom) Falkirk
  - Elite winners: (United Kingdom) Corran Carrick-Anderson (m) / (United Kingdom) Josie Nelson (f)
  - Juniors winners: (United Kingdom) Nathan Smith (m) / (United Kingdom) Ella MacLean-Howell (f)
- November 21, 2021: National Trophy Series #4 in (United Kingdom) Sunderland
  - Elite winners: (United Kingdom) Rory Mcguire (m) / (United Kingdom) Amira Mellor (f)
  - Juniors winners: (United Kingdom) Nathan Smith (m) / (United Kingdom) Ella MacLean-Howell (f)
  - December 11, 2021: National Trophy Series #5 in (United Kingdom) Gravesend
  - Elite winners: (United Kingdom) Cameron Mason (m) / (United Kingdom) Millie Couzens (f)
  - Juniors winners: (United Kingdom) Nathan Smith (m) / (United Kingdom) Emily Carrick-Anderson (f)
- January 16: National Trophy Series #6 in (United Kingdom) Skipton (final)
  - Elite winners: (United Kingdom) Thomas Mein (m) / (United Kingdom) Anna Kay (f)
  - Juniors winners: (United Kingdom) Nathan Smith (m) / (United Kingdom) Ella MacLean-Howell (f)

=== USCX Cyclocross Series 2021–2022 ===
- September 25, 2021: USCX Cyclocross Series #1 in (United States) Rochester
  - Elite winners: (Belgium) Vincent Baestaens (m) / (Canada) Maghalie Rochette (f)
  - Juniors winners: (United States) Andrew August (m) / (United States) Katherine Sarkisov (f)
- September 26, 2021: USCX Cyclocross Series #2 in (United States) Rochester
  - Elite winners: (Belgium) Vincent Baestaens (m) / (Canada) Maghalie Rochette (f)
  - Juniors winners: (United States) Frank O'Reilly (m) / (United States) Katherine Sarkisov (f)
- October 2, 2021: USCX Cyclocross Series #3 in (United States) Baltimore
  - Elite winners: (Belgium) Vincent Baestaens (m) / (United States) Clara Honsinger (f)
  - Juniors winners: (United States) Marcis Shelton (m) / (United States) Katherine Sarkisov (f)
- October 3, 2021: USCX Cyclocross Series #4 in (United States) Baltimore
  - Elite winners: (Belgium) Vincent Baestaens (m) / (Canada) Maghalie Rochette (f)
  - Juniors winners: (United States) Frank O'Reilly (m) / (United States) Chloe Frazer (f)
- October 15, 2021: USCX Cyclocross Series #5 in (United States) Iowa City
  - Elite winners: (Belgium) Vincent Baestaens (m) / (Netherlands) Shirin van Anrooij (f)
  - Juniors winners: (United States) Jack Spranger (m) / (Canada) Isabella Holmgren (f)
- October 16, 2021: USCX Cyclocross Series #6 in (United States) Iowa City
  - Elite winners: (Belgium) Niels Vandeputte (m) / (Netherlands) Manon Bakker (f)
  - Juniors winners: (United States) Jack Spranger (m) / (United States) Katherine Sarkisov (f)
- October 23, 2021: USCX Cyclocross Series #7 in (United States) Mason
  - Elite winners: (United States) Eric Brunner (m) / (Canada) Maghalie Rochette (f)
  - Juniors winners: (United States) Jack Spranger (m) / (United States) Ava Holmgren (f)
- October 24, 2021: USCX Cyclocross Series #8 in (United States) Mason (final)
  - Elite winners: (United States) Kerry Werner (m) / (Canada) Maghalie Rochette (f)
  - Juniors winners: (Canada) Ian Ackert (m) / (Canada) Isabella Holmgren (f)

== Cycling — Indoor ==
- November 4 – 6: 2022 UCI Indoor Cycling World Championships in (Belgium) Ghent

== Cycling — Mountain bike ==
- August 24 – 28: 2022 UCI Mountain Bike World Championships in (France) Les Gets
- September 17 & 18: 2022 UCI Mountain Bike Marathon World Championships in (Denmark) Haderslev
- October 2: 2022 UCI Mountain Bike Eliminator World Championships in (Spain) Barcelona

=== 2022 UCI Mountain Bike World Cup ===
- March 26 & 27: #1 in (France) Lourdes
  - DHI winners: (France) Amaury Pierron (m) / (Switzerland) Camille Balanche (f)
- April 8 – 10: #2 in (Brazil) Petrópolis
  - XCC winners: (South Africa) Alan Hatherly (m) / (France) Pauline Ferrand-Prévot (f)
  - XCO winners: (Switzerland) Nino Schurter (m) / (Australia) Rebecca McConnell (f)
- May 6 – 8: #3 in (Germany) Albstadt
  - XCC winners: (New Zealand) Sam Gaze (m) / (Australia) Rebecca McConnell (f)
  - XCO winners: (United Kingdom) Tom Pidcock (m) / (Australia) Rebecca McConnell (f)
- May 13 – 15: #4 in (Czech Republic) Nové Město na Moravě
  - XCC winners: (Germany) Luca Schwarzbauer (m) / (Switzerland) Jolanda Neff (f)
  - XCO winners: (United Kingdom) Tom Pidcock (m) / (Australia) Rebecca McConnell (f)
- May 21 & 22: #5 in (United Kingdom) Fort William
  - DHI winners: (France) Amaury Pierron (m) / (Germany) Nina Hoffmann (f)

== Cycling — Road ==
- March 23 – 26: 2022 African Road Cycling Championships in (Egypt) Cairo
  - Seniors ITT winners: (South Africa) Gustav Basson (m) / (Algeria) Nesrine Houili (f)
  - Juniors ITT winners: (Eritrea) Aklilu Arefayne (m) / (South Africa) Caitlin Thompson (f)
  - Seniors Team Time Trial winners: Eritrea (m) / Eritrea (f)
  - Juniors Team Time Trial winners: Eritrea (m) / Eritrea (f)
- August 14 – 21: 2022 European Road Cycling Championships in (Germany) Munich
- September 18 – 25: 2022 UCI Road World Championships in (Australia) Wollongong

=== 2022 UCI World Tour ===
- February 20 – 26: (United Arab Emirates) UAE Tour
  - Winner: (Slovenia) Tadej Pogačar (UAE Team Emirates)
- February 26: (Belgium) 2022 Omloop Het Nieuwsblad
  - Winner: (Belgium) Wout van Aert (Team Jumbo–Visma)
- March 5: (Italy) 2022 Strade Bianche
  - Winner: (Slovenia) Matej Mohorič (Team Bahrain Victorious)
- March 6 – 13: (France) 2022 Paris–Nice
  - Winner: (Slovenia) Primož Roglič (Team Jumbo–Visma)
- March 7 – 13: (Italy) 2022 Tirreno–Adriatico
  - Winner: (Slovenia) Tadej Pogačar (UAE Team Emirates)
- March 19: (Italy) 2022 Milan–San Remo
  - Winner: (Slovenia) Matej Mohorič (Team Bahrain Victorious)
- March 21 – 27: (Spain) 2022 Volta a Catalunya
  - Winner: (Colombia) Sergio Higuita (Bora–Hansgrohe)
- March 23: (Belgium) 2022 Classic Brugge–De Panne
  - Winner: (Belgium) Tim Merlier (Alpecin–Fenix)
- March 25: (Belgium) 2022 E3 Saxo Bank Classic
  - Winner: (Belgium) Wout van Aert (Team Jumbo–Visma)
- March 27: (Belgium) 2022 Gent–Wevelgem
  - Winner: (Eritrea) Biniam Girmay (Intermarché–Wanty–Gobert Matériaux)
- March 30: (Belgium) 2022 Dwars door Vlaanderen
  - Winner: (Netherlands) Mathieu van der Poel (Alpecin–Fenix)
- April 3: (Belgium) 2022 Tour of Flanders
  - Winner: (Netherlands) Mathieu van der Poel (Alpecin–Fenix)
- April 4 – 9: (Spain) 2022 Tour of the Basque Country
  - Winner: (Colombia) Daniel Martínez (INEOS Grenadiers)
- April 10: (Belgium) 2022 Amstel Gold Race
  - Winner: (Poland) Michał Kwiatkowski (INEOS Grenadiers)
- April 17: (France) 2022 Paris–Roubaix
  - Winner: (Netherlands) Dylan van Baarle (INEOS Grenadiers)
- April 20: (Belgium) 2022 La Flèche Wallonne
  - Winner: (Belgium) Dylan Teuns (Team Bahrain Victorious)
- April 24: (Belgium) 2022 Liège–Bastogne–Liège
  - Winner: (Belgium) Remco Evenepoel (Quick-Step Alpha Vinyl Team)
- April 26 – May 1: (Switzerland) 2022 Tour de Romandie
  - Winner: Aleksandr Vlasov (Bora–Hansgrohe)
- May 1: (Germany) 2022 Eschborn–Frankfurt
  - Winner: (Republic of Ireland) Sam Bennett (Bora–Hansgrohe)
- May 6 – 29: (Italy) 2022 Giro d'Italia
  - Winner: (Australia) Jai Hindley (Bora–Hansgrohe)
- June 5 – 12: (France) 2022 Critérium du Dauphiné
  - Winner: (Slovenia) Primož Roglič (Team Jumbo–Visma)
- June 12 – 19: (Switzerland) 2022 Tour de Suisse
  - Winner: (United Kingdom) Geraint Thomas (INEOS Grenadiers)

=== 2022 UCI ProSeries ===
- February 2 – 6: (Spain) 2022 Volta a la Comunitat Valenciana
  - Winner: (Russia) Aleksandr Vlasov (Bora–Hansgrohe)
- February 10 – 13: (France) 2022 Tour de la Provence
  - Winner: (Colombia) Nairo Quintana (Arkéa–Samsic)
- February 10 – 15: 2022 Tour of Oman
  - Winner: (Czech Republic) Jan Hirt (Intermarché–Wanty–Gobert Matériaux)
- February 13: (Spain) 2022 Clásica de Almería
  - Winner: (Norway) Alexander Kristoff (Intermarché–Wanty–Gobert Matériaux)
- February 16 – 20: (Portugal) 2022 Volta ao Algarve
  - Winner: (Belgium) Remco Evenepoel (Quick-Step Alpha Vinyl Team)
- February 16 – 20: (Spain) 2022 Vuelta a Andalucía
  - Winner: (Netherlands) Wout Poels (Team Bahrain Victorious)
- February 26: (France) 2022 Faun-Ardèche Classic
  - Winner: (United States) Brandon McNulty (UAE Team Emirates)
- February 27: (Belgium) 2022 Kuurne–Brussels–Kuurne
  - Winner: (Netherlands) Fabio Jakobsen (Quick-Step Alpha Vinyl Team)
- February 27: (France) 2022 La Drôme Classic
  - Winner: (Denmark) Jonas Vingegaard (Team Jumbo–Visma)
- March 2: (Italy) 2022 Trofeo Laigueglia
  - Winner: (Slovenia) Jan Polanc (UAE Team Emirates)
- March 16: (Belgium) 2022 Nokere Koerse
  - Winner: (Belgium) Tim Merlier (Alpecin–Fenix)
- March 16: (Italy) 2022 Milano–Torino
  - Winner: (United Kingdom) Mark Cavendish (Quick-Step Alpha Vinyl Team)
- March 17: (France) 2022 Grand Prix de Denain
  - Winner: (Germany) Max Walscheid (Cofidis)
- March 18: (Belgium) 2022 Bredene Koksijde Classic
  - Winner: (Germany) Pascal Ackermann (UAE Team Emirates)
- March 27: (Italy) 2022 GP Industria & Artigianato di Larciano
  - Winner: (Italy) Diego Ulissi (UAE Team Emirates)
- April 2: (Spain) 2022 GP Miguel Induráin
  - Winner: (France) Warren Barguil (Arkéa–Samsic)
- April 6: (Belgium) 2022 Scheldeprijs
  - Winner: (Norway) Alexander Kristoff (Intermarché–Wanty–Gobert Matériaux)
- April 10 – 17: 2022 Presidential Tour of Turkey
  - Winner: (New Zealand) Patrick Bevin (Israel–Premier Tech)
- April 13: (Belgium) 2022 Brabantse Pijl
  - Winner: (United States) Magnus Sheffield (INEOS Grenadiers)
- April 18 – 22: (Italy) 2022 Tour of the Alps
  - Winner: (France) Romain Bardet (Team DSM)
- May 3 – 8: (France) 2022 Four Days of Dunkirk
  - Winner: (Belgium) Philippe Gilbert (Lotto–Soudal)
- May 14: (France) 2022 Grand Prix du Morbihan
  - Winner: (France) Julien Simon (Team TotalEnergies)
- May 15: (France) 2022 Tro-Bro Léon
  - Winner: (France) Hugo Hofstetter (Arkéa–Samsic)

=== 2022 UCI Women's World Tour ===
- March 5: (Italy) 2022 Strade Bianche
  - Winner: (Belgium) Lotte Kopecky (SD Worx)
- March 12: (Netherlands) 2022 Ronde van Drenthe
  - Winner: (Netherlands) Lorena Wiebes (Team DSM)
- March 20: (Italy) 2022 Trofeo Alfredo Binda-Comune di Cittiglio
  - Winner: (Italy) Elisa Balsamo (Trek–Segafredo)
- March 24: (Belgium) 2022 Classic Brugge–De Panne
  - Winner: (Italy) Elisa Balsamo (Trek–Segafredo)
- March 27: (Belgium) 2022 Gent–Wevelgem
  - Winner: (Italy) Elisa Balsamo (Trek–Segafredo)
- April 3: (Belgium) 2022 Tour of Flanders
  - Winner: (Belgium) Lotte Kopecky (SD Worx)
- April 10: (Netherlands) 2022 Amstel Gold Race
  - Winner: (Italy) Marta Cavalli (FDJ Nouvelle-Aquitaine Futuroscope)
- April 16: (France) 2022 Paris–Roubaix
  - Winner: (Italy) Elisa Longo Borghini (Trek–Segafredo)
- April 20: (Belgium) 2022 La Flèche Wallonne
  - Winner: (Italy) Marta Cavalli (FDJ Nouvelle-Aquitaine Futuroscope)
- April 24: (Belgium) Liège–Bastogne–Liège
  - Winner: (Netherlands) Annemiek van Vleuten (Movistar Team)

=== 2022 UCI Women's ProSeries ===
- February 26: (Belgium) 2022 Omloop Het Nieuwsblad
  - Winner: (Netherlands) Annemiek van Vleuten (Movistar Team)
- March 16: (Belgium) 2022 Nokere Koerse
  - Winner: (Netherlands) Lorena Wiebes (Team DSM)
- March 30: (Belgium) 2022 Dwars door Vlaanderen
  - Winner: (Italy) Chiara Consonni (Valcar–Travel & Service)
- April 13: (Belgium) 2022 Brabantse Pijl
  - Winner: (Netherlands) Demi Vollering (SD Worx)
- April 29 – May 1: (Luxembourg) 2022 Festival Elsy Jacobs
  - Winner: (Italy) Marta Bastianelli (UAE Team ADQ)

== Darts ==
=== Professional Darts Corporation ===
- December 15, 2021 – January 3: 2022 PDC World Darts Championship in (England) London
  - (Scotland) Peter Wright defeated (England) Michael Smith, 7–5.
- January 28 – 30: 2022 Masters in (England) Milton Keynes
  - (England) Joe Cullen defeated (England) Dave Chisnall, 11–9.
- February 3 – June 13: 2022 Premier League Darts
  - (Netherlands) Michael van Gerwen defeated (England) Joe Cullen, 11–10.
- March 4 – 6: 2022 UK Open in (England) Minehead
  - (Netherlands) Danny Noppert defeated (England) Michael Smith, 11–10.
- June 16 – 19: 2022 PDC World Cup of Darts in (Germany) Frankfurt
  - Australia (Damon Heta and Simon Whitlock) beat Wales (Gerwyn Price and Jonny Clayton), 3–1.
- July 16 – 24: 2022 World Matchplay in (England) Blackpool
  - (Netherlands) Michael van Gerwen defeated (Wales) Gerwyn Price, 18–14.
- October 2 – 8: 2022 World Grand Prix in (England) Leicester
  - (Netherlands) Michael van Gerwen defeated (England) Nathan Aspinall, 5–3.
- October 27 – 30: 2022 European Championship in (Germany) Dortmund
  - (England) Ross Smith defeated (England) Michael Smith, 11–8.
- November 12 – 20: 2022 Grand Slam of Darts in (England) Wolverhampton
  - (England) Michael Smith defeated (England) Nathan Aspinall, 16–5.
- November 26 – 27: 2022 Players Championship Finals in (England) Minehead
  - (Netherlands) Michael van Gerwen defeated (England) Rob Cross, 11–6.

==== World Series of Darts ====
- June 3 – 4: 2022 US Darts Masters in (United States) New York
  - Michael Smith defeated Michael van Gerwen , 8–4.
- June 10 – 11: 2022 Nordic Darts Masters in (Denmark) Copenhagen
  - Dimitri Van den Bergh defeated Gary Anderson , 11–5.
- June 24 – 25: 2022 Dutch Darts Masters in (Netherlands) Amsterdam
  - Dimitri Van den Bergh defeated Dirk van Duijvenbode , 8–2.
- August 12 – 13: 2022 Queensland Darts Masters in (Australia) Townsville
  - Michael van Gerwen defeated Gerwyn Price , 8–5.
- August 19 – 20: 2022 New South Wales Darts Masters in (Australia) Wollongong
  - Jonny Clayton defeated James Wade , 8–1.
- August 26 – 27: 2022 New Zealand Darts Masters in Hamilton
  - Gerwyn Price defeated Jonny Clayton , 8–4.
- September 16 – 18: 2022 World Series of Darts Finals in (Netherlands) Amsterdam
  - Gerwyn Price defeated Dirk van Duijvenbode , 11–10.

=== World Darts Federation ===
- April 2 – 10: 2022 WDF World Darts Championship in (England) Frimley Green
  - Men: (Northern Ireland) Neil Duff defeated (France) Thibault Tricole, 6–5.
  - Women: (England) Beau Greaves defeated (England) Kirsty Hutchinson, 4–0.

==== 2022 Masters ====
- February 18 – 20: Slovak Masters in (Slovakia) Šamorín
  - postponed
- March 11 – 13: Budapest Masters in Hungary
  - (Hungary) Andras Borbely defeated (Hungary) János Végső, 6–3.
- April 8 – 10: German Masters in (Germany) Kalkar
- April 30 – May 1: Denmark Masters in Esbjerg
  - (England) James Richardson defeated (Netherlands) Jelle Klaasen, 6–5.
- July 30 & 31: Luxembourg Masters in Luxembourg City
- October 2: Australian Masters in (Australia) Geelong
- November 4 – 6: Hungarian Masters in (Hungary) Budapest (final)

== Dancesport ==
- May 1: 2022 WDSF PD Latin World Championship in (China) Shijiazhuang

== Dodgeball ==
- TBD: 2022 World Dodgeball Championships

== Disc golf ==
Men's PDGA Majors

- January 14 – 16: Shelly Sharpe Memorial in (Arizona) Scottsdale
  - Winners: (Arizona) Anthony Barela (m) / (Arizona) Jennifer Allen (f)
- January 21 – 23: DG1 Presents: The Winter Wonderland Amateur Showcase in Florida
  - Winners: (Florida) Luke Callaghan (m) / (Florida) Jordan Lynds (f)
- February 19 & 20: The 2022 Gulf Coast Charity Open in (Florida) Tampa
- February 24 – 27: Las Vegas Challenge in (Nevada) Henderson
- March 3 – 6: Memorial Championship in (Arizona) Scottsdale
- March 3 – 5: 2022 NZ Disc Golf Championships in (New Zealand) Wellington
- March 11 – 13: St. Patrick's Classic – California Amateur State Championships in Orangevale
- March 18: Daniel Boe Memorial – Weekend 1 in (California) Escondido
- March 18 – 20: The Open at Belton a DGPT Silver Series Event in (Texas) Belton
- March 18 – 20: St. Patrick's Classic in (California) Orangevale
- March 25 – 27: Auburn Amateur Driving in (California) Auburn
- March 25 – 27: Daniel Boe Memorial – Weekend 2 in (California) Escondido
- March 25 – 27: Sun King's Throw Down the Mountain X (Weekend 3) in (Florida) Brooksville
- March 26 & 27: Southern Michigan Open Dexter

=== 2022 Disc Golf Pro Tour ===
- February 24 – 27: Las Vegas Challenge in (Nevada) Henderson
- March 11 – 13: Waco Annual Charity in (Texas) Waco
- March 24 – 27: 27th Annual Texas State Disc Golf Championship in Tyler

=== 2022 National Amateur Disc Golf Tour ===
- January 1 & 2: Zanfel Premier Tour #1 in (Arizona) Mesa
  - Winners: (Arizona) Brad Wylam (m) / (Arizona) Camella Aday (f)
- February 5 & 6: Zanfel Premier Tour #2 in (Georgia (U.S. state)) Appling

=== 2022 PDGA Euro Tour ===
- March 4 – 6: ET#1 – Pro Forester in (Croatia) Varaždin

== Draughts ==
- January 5 – 20: 2022 World Draughts Championship match in (Netherlands) Eindhoven
  - (Netherlands) Roel Boomstra def. (Russia) Alexander Schwarzman
- May 1 – 5: 2022 Draughts World National Teams Championship in (Turkey) Antalya
  - Open final placements: (gold) Netherlands, (silver) Senegal, (bronze) France
  - Women's final placements: (gold) Netherlands, (silver) Ukraine, (bronze) Poland
- May 8: 2022 Draughts World National Teams Championship Blitz in (Turkey) Antalya
  - Final placements: (gold) Cameroon, (silver) France, (bronze) Netherlands
- July 10: 2022 Draughts World Championship Blitz in (Latvia) Riga
- October 28 – November 5: 2022 Draughts World Youth Championship in (Turkey) Antalya
- December 17 & 18: 2022 Draughts World Championship Rapid in (Poland) Warsaw

=== 2022 Draughts World Cup ===
- January 22 – 29: WC #1 in (Burkina Faso) Ouagadougou
  - Winners: (Cameroon) Jean Marc Ndjofang (m) / (Russia) Anastasia Arkhangelskaya (f)
- July 2 – 9: WC #2 in (Latvia) Riga
- July 16 – 23: WC #3 in (Netherlands) Heerhugowaard
- October 16 – 21: WC #4 in (Netherlands) Beilen
- December 10 – 17: WC #5 in (Poland) Warsaw (final)

== Equestrianism ==
- August 6 – 14: 2022 FEI World Equestrian Games in (Denmark) Herning
- September 14 – 18: 2022 World Eventing Championships in (Italy) Pratoni del Vivaro
- September 15 – 18: 2022 Single Driving World Championship in (France) Le Pin-au-Haras
- September 21 – 25: 2022 Four-in-Hand Driving World Championship in (Italy) Pratoni del Vivaro
- October 22: 2022 FEI Endurance World Championship in (Italy) Verona

=== 2021–22 FEI World Cup Dressage ===
- April 6 – 10: FEI World Cup Dressage final in (Germany) Leipzig

=== 2021–22 FEI World Cup Jumping ===
- April 6 – 10: FEI World Cup Jumping final in (Germany) Leipzig

=== 2021–22 FEI World Cup Driving ===
- April 6 – 10: FEI World Cup Jumping final in (Germany) Leipzig

=== 2022 FEI Jumping Nations Cup ===
- January 19 – 23: Nations Cup #1 in (United Arab Emirates) Abu Dhabi
  - Winners: Ireland
- March 16 – 20: Nations Cup #2 in (Mexico) Coapexpan
- May 10 – 15: Nations Cup #3 in (United States) San Juan Capistrano
- May 31 – June 5: Nations Cup #4 in (Canada) Langley
- June 3 – 6: Nations Cup #5 in (Switzerland) St. Gallen
- June 9 – 12: Nations Cup #6 in (Poland) Sopot
- June 23 – 26: Nations Cup #7 in (Netherlands) Rotterdam
- July 14 – 17: Nations Cup #8 in (Sweden) Falsterbo
- July 27 – 31: Nations Cup #9 in (United Kingdom) Twineham
- August 17 – 21: Nations Cup #10 in (Republic of Ireland) Dublin
- September 29 – October 2: Nations Cup #11 in (Spain) Barcelona (final)

== Fencing ==
- July 15 – 23: 2022 World Fencing Championships in (Egypt) Cairo

=== 2021–22 Fencing World Cup ===
- November 19 – 21, 2021: WC #1 in (Estonia) Tallinn
  - Women's Épée winner: (France) Joséphine Jacques-André-Coquin
  - Women's Team Épée winners: Russia
- November 19 – 21, 2021: WC #2 in (Switzerland) Bern
  - Men's Épée winner: (Venezuela) Rubén Limardo
  - Men's Team Épée winners: Russia
- December 10 – 12, 2021: WC #3 in (France) Saint-Maur-des-Fossés
  - Women's Foil winner: (Italy) Alice Volpi
  - Women's Team Foil winners: Italy
- January 14 – 16: WC #4 in (France) Paris
  - Men's Foil winner: (Hong Kong) Cheung Ka Long
  - Men's Team Foil winners: Italy
- January 14 – 16: WC #5 in (Poland) Poznań
  - Women's Foil winner: (Italy) Alice Volpi
  - Women's Team Foil winners: United States
- January 15 – 17: WC #6 in (Georgia (country)) Tbilisi
  - Men's Sabre winner: (Georgia (country)) Sandro Bazadze
  - Women's Sabre winner: (France) Caroline Queroli
  - Men's Team Sabre winners: South Korea
  - Women's Team Sabre winners: South Korea
- January 28 – 30: WC #7 in (Bulgaria) Plovdiv
  - Women's Sabre winner: (Azerbaijan) Anna Bashta
  - Women's Team Sabre winners: France
- January 28 – 30: WC #8 in (Qatar) Doha
  - Men's Épée winner: (France) Yannick Borel
  - Women's Épée winner: (Estonia) Katrina Lehis
- February 11 – 13: WC #9 in Sochi
  - Men's Épée winner: (Italy) Valerio Cuomo
  - Men's Team Épée winners: Russia
- February 11 – 13: WC #10 in (Spain) Barcelona
  - Women's Épée winner: (South Korea) Song Se-ra
  - Women's Team Épée winners: France
- February 25 – 27: WC #11 in (Egypt) Cairo
  - Men's Foil winner: (Russia) Anton Borodachev
  - Men's Team Foil winners: United States
- February 25 – 27: WC #12 in (Mexico) Guadalajara
  - Women's Foil winner: (Italy) Alice Volpi
  - Women's Team Foil winners: United States
- March 4 – 6: WC #13 in (Greece) Athens
  - Women's Sabre winner: (Azerbaijan) Anna Bashta
  - Women's Team Sabre winners: Italy
- March 4 – 6: WC #14 in (Hungary) Budapest
  - Men's Épée winner: (Venezuela) Rubén Limardo
  - Women's Épée winner: (Italy) Alberta Santuccio
- March 18 – 20: WC #15 in Budapest
  - Men's Sabre winner: (Hungary) Áron Szilágyi
  - Men's Team Sabre winners: Hungary
- March 18 – 20: WC #16 in (Turkey) Istanbul
  - Women's Sabre winner: (France) Manon Apithy-Brunet
  - Women's Team Sabre winners: South Korea
- April 15 – 17: WC #17 in (France) Paris
  - Men's Épée winner: (France) Nelson Lopez-Pourtier
  - Men's Team Épée winners: Hungary
- April 15 – 18: WC #18 in (Serbia) Belgrade
  - Men's Foil winner: (Italy) Tommaso Marini
  - Women's Foil winner: (Germany) Anne Sauer
  - Men's Team Foil winners: Italy
  - Women's Team Foil winners: France
- April 29 – May 1: WC #19 in (Bulgaria) Plovdiv
  - Men's Foil winner: (Italy) Alessio Foconi
  - Men's Team Foil winners: Italy
- April 29 – May 1: WC #20 in (Germany) Tauberbischofsheim
  - Women's Foil winner: (United States) Lee Kiefer
  - Women's Team Foil winners: Italy
- April 29 – May 1: WC #21 in (Egypt) Cairo
  - Men's Épée winner: (France) Yannick Borel
  - Women's Épée winner: (South Korea) Choi In-jeong
- May 6 – 8: WC #22 in (Spain) Madrid
  - Men's Sabre winner: (South Korea) Oh Sang-uk
  - Men's Team Sabre winners: South Korea
- May 6 – 8: WC #23 in (Tunisia) Hammamet
  - Women's Sabre winner: (Japan) Misaki Emura
  - Women's Team Sabre winners: South Korea
- May 12 – 14: WC #24 in (Germany) Heidenheim an der Brenz
  - Men's Épée winner: (France) Romain Cannone
  - Men's Team Épée winners: South Korea
- May 13 – 15: WC #25 in (South Korea) Incheon
  - Men's Foil winner: (Italy) Tommaso Marini
  - Women's Foil winner: (United States) Lee Kiefer
- May 20 – 22: WC #26 in (Italy) Padua
  - Men's Sabre winner: (Hungary) Áron Szilágyi
  - Women's Sabre winner: (Azerbaijan) Anna Bashta
- May 27 – 29: WC #27 in (Poland) Katowice
  - Women's Épée winner: (South Korea) Choi In-jeong
  - Women's Team Épée winners: South Korea
- May 27 – 29: WC #28 in (Georgia (country)) Tbilisi
  - Men's Épée winner: (Ukraine) Volodymyr Stankevych
  - Men's Team Épée winners: Switzerland

== Field hockey ==
- October 13, 2021 – June 19: 2021–22 Women's FIH Pro League
- October 16, 2021 – June 30: 2021–22 Men's FIH Pro League
- February 2 – 6: 2022 Men's FIH Indoor Hockey World Cup and 2022 Women's FIH Indoor Hockey World Cup in (Belgium) Liège
- July 1 – 17: 2022 Women's FIH Hockey World Cup in (Spain) Terrassa and (Netherlands) Amstelveen

=== EHF ===
- January 14 – 16: 2022 Men's EuroHockey Indoor Championship II in Paredes
  - Winners: Spain, 2nd: Poland, 3rd: Croatia, 4th: Ukraine, 5th: Portugal, 6th: Turkey, 7th: Slovakia, 8th: Italy
  - Spain and Poland promoted for 2024 Men's EuroHockey Indoor Championship.
- January 21 – 23: 2022 Women's EuroHockey Indoor Championship II in Ourense
  - Winners: Spain, 2nd: Belgium, 3rd: Poland, 4th: Switzerland, 5th: Scotland, 6th: Ireland
  - Spain and Belgium promoted for 2024 Women's EuroHockey Indoor Championship.
- TBD: 2022 Men's EuroHockey Indoor Championship III in (Cyprus) Nicosia
- TBD: 2022 Women's EuroHockey Indoor Championship III in (Slovakia) Bratislava
- TBD for December: 2022 Men's EuroHockey Indoor Championship and 2022 Women's EuroHockey Indoor Championship in (Germany) Hamburg

=== AHF ===
- January 21 – 28: 2022 Women's Hockey Asia Cup in (Oman) Muscat
  - In the final, Japan defeated South Korea, 4–2, to win their 3rd title. India took third place.
  - Japan, South Korea, India and China qualified for 2022 Women's FIH Hockey World Cup.

=== AHfH ===
- January 17 – 23: 2022 Men's Hockey Africa Cup of Nations in (Ghana) Accra
  - In the final, South Africa defeated Egypt, after penalties, 3–1, to win their 8th title. Nigeria took third place.
  - South Africa qualified for 2023 Men's FIH Hockey World Cup.
- January 17 – 23: 2022 Women's Hockey Africa Cup of Nations in Accra
  - In the final, South Africa defeated Ghana, 3–1, to win their 7th title. Kenya took third place.
  - South Africa qualified for 2022 Women's FIH Hockey World Cup.

=== PAHF ===
- January 19 – 30: 2022 Men's Pan American Cup and 2022 Women's Pan American Cup in Santiago
  - Men's tournament: In the final, Argentina defeated Chile, 5–1, to win their 5th title. Canada took third place.
  - Argentina and Chile qualified for 2023 Men's FIH Hockey World Cup.
  - Women's tournament: In the final, Argentina defeated Chile, 4–2, to win their 6th title. Canada took third place.
  - Argentina, Chile and Canada qualified for 2022 Women's FIH Hockey World Cup.

== Figure skating ==
=== International figure skating events ===
==== 2022 Winter Olympics ====
- February 4 – 20: Figure skating at the 2022 Winter Olympics in (China) Beijing

==== 2021–22 ISU Figure Skating Championships ====
- January 10 – 16: European Championships in (Estonia) Tallinn
  - Men's champion: (Russia) Mark Kondratiuk
  - Women's champion: (Russia) Kamila Valieva
  - Pairs champions: (Russia) Anastasia Mishina / Aleksandr Galliamov
  - Ice dance champions: (Russia) Victoria Sinitsina / Nikita Katsalapov
- January 18 – 23: Four Continents Championships in (Estonia) Tallinn
  - Men's champion: (South Korea) Cha Jun-hwan
  - Women's champion: (Japan) Mai Mihara
  - Pairs champions: (United States) Audrey Lu / Misha Mitrofanov
  - Ice dance champions: (United States) Caroline Green / Michael Parsons
- March 7 – 13: World Junior Championships in (Estonia) Tallinn
- March 21 – 27: World Championships in (France) Montpellier

==== 2021–22 ISU Grand Prix of Figure Skating ====
- October 22 – 24, 2021: Skate America in (United States) Las Vegas
  - Men's champion: (United States) Vincent Zhou
  - Women's champion: (Russia) Alexandra Trusova
  - Pairs champions: (Russia) Evgenia Tarasova / Vladimir Morozov
  - Ice dance champions: (United States) Madison Hubbell / Zachary Donohue
- October 29 – 31, 2021: Skate Canada in Vancouver
  - Men's champion: (United States) Nathan Chen
  - Women's champion: (Russia) Kamila Valieva
  - Pairs chmpions: (China) Sui Wenjing / Han Cong
  - Ice dance champions: (Canada) Piper Gilles / Paul Poirier
- November 5 – 7, 2021: Gran Premio d'Italia in (Italy) Turin
  - Men's champion: (Japan) Yuma Kagiyama
  - Women's champion: (Russia) Anna Shcherbakova
  - Pairs chmpions: (China) Sui Wenjing / Han Cong
  - Ice dance champions: (France) Gabriella Papadakis / Guillaume Cizeron
- November 12 – 14, 2021: NHK Trophy in (Japan) Tokyo
  - Men's champion: (Japan) Shoma Uno
  - Women's champion: (Japan) Kaori Sakamoto
  - Pairs champions: (Russia) Anastasia Mishina / Aleksandr Galliamov
  - Ice dance champions: (Russia) Victoria Sinitsina / Nikita Katsalapov
- November 19 – 21, 2021: Internationaux de France in Grenoble
  - Men's champion: (Japan) Yuma Kagiyama
  - Women's champion: (Russia) Anna Shcherbakova
  - Pairs champions: (Russia) Aleksandra Boikova / Dmitrii Kozlovskii
  - Ice dance champions: (France) Gabriella Papadakis / Guillaume Cizeron
- November 26 – 28, 2021: Rostelecom Cup in (Russia) Sochi
  - Men's champion: (Georgia (country)) Morisi Kvitelashvili
  - Women's champion: (Russia) Kamila Valieva
  - Pairs champions: (Russia) Anastasia Mishina / Aleksandr Galliamov
  - Ice dance champions: (Russia) Victoria Sinitsina / Nikita Katsalapov
- TBD: Grand Prix Final in TBD

==== 2021–22 ISU Junior Grand Prix ====
- August 18 – 21, 2021: JGP #1 in (France) Courchevel
  - Junior men's champion: (United States) Ilia Malinin
  - Junior women's champion: (United States) Lindsay Thorngren
  - No junior pairs event held.
  - Junior ice dance champion: (United States) Katarina Wolfkostin / Jeffrey Chen
- August 25 – 28, 2021: JGP #2 in (France) Courchevel #2
  - Junior men's champion: (Canada) Wesley Chiu
  - Junior women's champion: (United States) Isabeau Levito
  - No junior pairs event held.
  - Junior ice dance champion: (United States) Oona Brown / Gage Brown
- September 1 – 4, 2021: JGP #3 in (Slovakia) Košice
  - Junior men's champion: (Russia) Kirill Sarnovskiy
  - Junior women's champion: (Russia) Veronika Zhilina
  - Junior pairs champion: (Russia) Anastasia Mukhortova / Dmitry Evgenyev
  - Junior ice dance champion: (Canada) Natalie D'Alessandro / Bruce Waddell
- September 15 – 18, 2021: JGP #4 in (Russia) Krasnoyarsk
  - Junior men's champion: (Russia) Gleb Lutfullin
  - Junior women's champion: (Russia) Sofia Akateva
  - Junior pairs champion: (Russia) Ekaterina Chikmareva / Matvei Ianchenkov
  - Junior ice dance champion: (Russia) Irina Khavronina / Dario Cirisano
- September 22 – 25, 2021: JGP #5 in (Slovenia) Ljubljana
  - Junior men's champion: (Russia) Ilya Yablokov
  - Junior women's champion: (Russia) Adeliia Petrosian
  - No junior pairs event held.
  - Junior ice dance champion: (Russia) Vasilisa Kaganovskaia / Valeriy Angelopol
- September 29 – October 2, 2021: JGP #6 in (Poland) Gdańsk
  - Junior men's champion: (Russia) Gleb Lutfullin
  - Junior women's champion: (Russia) Sofia Akateva
  - Junior pairs champion: (Russia) Ekaterina Chikmareva / Matvei Ianchenkov
  - Junior ice dance champion: (Russia) Irina Khavronina / Dario Cirisano
- October 6 – 9, 2021: JGP #7 in (Austria) Linz
  - Junior men's champion: (United States) Ilia Malinin
  - Junior women's champion: (Russia) Sofia Muravieva
  - Junior pairs champion: (Russia) Natalia Khabibullina / Ilya Knyazhuk
  - Junior ice dance champion: (Russia) Sofya Tyutyunina / Alexander Shustitskiy
- TBD: JGP Final in TBD

==== 2021–22 ISU Challenger Series ====
- September 10 – 12, 2021: Lombardia Trophy in (Italy) Bergamo
  - Men's champion: (Italy) Daniel Grassl
  - Women's champion: (United States) Alysa Liu
  - Pairs not included as part of Challenger event.
  - Ice dance champion: (Italy) Charlène Guignard / Marco Fabbri
- September 16 – 18, 2021: Autumn Classic in (Canada) Pierrefonds
  - Men's not included as part of Challenger event.
  - Women's champion: (Cyprus) Marilena Kitromilis
  - Pairs champion: (Japan) Riku Miura / Ryuichi Kihara
  - Ice dance champion: (Canada) Piper Gilles / Paul Poirier
- September 22 – 25, 2021: Nebelhorn Trophy in (Germany) Oberstdorf
  - Men's champion: (United States) Vincent Zhou
  - Women's champion: (United States) Alysa Liu
  - Pairs champion: (Germany) Minerva Fabienne Hase / Nolan Seegert
  - Ice dance champion: (Finland) Juulia Turkkila / Matthias Versluis
- ~~Sept. 30 – Oct. 2, 2021: Nepela Memorial in (Slovakia) Bratislava~~
- October 7 – 10, 2021: Finlandia Trophy in (Finland) Espoo
  - Men's champion: (United States) Jason Brown
  - Women's champion: (Russia) Kamila Valieva
  - Pairs champion: (Russia) Anastasia Mishina / Aleksandr Galliamov
  - Ice dance champion: (France) Gabriella Papadakis / Guillaume Cizeron
- October 13 – 17, 2021: Asian Open Trophy in (China) Beijing
  - Did not meet minimum entry requirements for Challenger events.
- October 28 – 31, 2021: Denis Ten Memorial Challenge in (Kazakhstan) Nur-Sultan
  - Men's champion: (Russia) Petr Gumennik
  - Women's champion: (Belarus) Viktoriia Safonova
  - Pairs not included as part of Challenger event.
  - Ice dance champion: (Russia) Anastasia Skoptsova / Kirill Aleshin
- November 11 – 14, 2021: Cup of Austria in Graz
  - Men's champion: (Georgia (country)) Nika Egadze
  - Women's champion: (Japan) Wakaba Higuchi
  - Pairs not included as part of Challenger event.
  - Ice dance champion: (Italy) Charlène Guignard / Marco Fabbri
- November 18 – 21, 2021: Warsaw Cup in (Poland) Warsaw
  - Men's champion: (Japan) Sōta Yamamoto
  - Women's champion: (Russia) Maiia Khromykh
  - Pairs champion: (Russia) Evgenia Tarasova / Vladimir Morozov
  - Ice dance champion: (Russia) Diana Davis / Gleb Smolkin
- December 8 – 11, 2021: Golden Spin of Zagreb in (Croatia) Sisak
  - Men's champion: (Canada) Keegan Messing
  - Women's champion: (Georgia (country)) Anastasia Gubanova
  - Pairs champion: (United States) Audrey Lu / Misha Mitrofanov
  - Ice dance champion: (United States) Kaitlin Hawayek / Jean-Luc Baker

== Fistball ==
=== EFA ===
- January 7 – 8: EFA 2022 Women's Champions Cup in (Germany) Calw
  - In the final, (Germany) TSV Dennach def. (Germany) TSV Calw, 4–2 (15–13, 11–9, 11–9, 9–11, 11–13, 11–5). (Switzerland) SVD Diepoldsau-Schmitter took third place.
- January 8 – 9: EFA 2022 Men's Champions Cup in (Germany) Pfungstadt
  - In the final, (Germany) TSV Pfungstadt def. (Austria) Union Tigers Vöcklabruck, 4–0 (11–9, 11–9, 11–7, 11–6). (Germany) TV Käfertal took third place.
- June 10 – 12: 2020 Men's Fistball European Championships in (Italy) Caldaro
- July 29 – 30: EFA 2022 Fistball U21 Men's European Championship in (Germany) Vaihingen an der Enz
- July 30 – 31: EFA 2022 Fistball U18 European Championships in (Germany) Vaihingen an der Enz
- October 1 – 2: 2022 European Youth Cup in (Germany) Kellinghusen

== Floorball ==
- Champions Cup – cancelled
- July 8 – 12 2022: Floorball at the 2022 World Games in United States
  - Champion: Sweden
- August 31 – September 4: 2022 Women's U-19 World Floorball Championships in Poland
  - Champion: Sweden
- November 5 – 13: 2022 Men's World Floorball Championships in Switzerland
  - Champion: Sweden

== Flying disc ==
- June 25 – July 2: 2022 World Masters Ultimate Club Championships in (Republic of Ireland) Limerick
- July 23 – 30: 2022 World Ultimate Club Championships in (United States) Lebanon
- August 1 – 6: 2022 World Overall Flying Disc Championships in (United States) San Diego
- August 6 – 13: 2022 World Junior Ultimate Championships in (Dominican Republic) Punta Cana
- August 17 – 20: 2022 World Team Disc Golf Championships in (Croatia) Varaždin

== Futsal ==
=== UEFA ===
- January 19 – February 6: UEFA Futsal Euro 2022 in Netherlands
- March 24 – 27: UEFA Women's Futsal Euro 2022 (final four in (Portugal) Gondomar)
- April 30 – May 1: 2021–22 UEFA Futsal Champions League (final four in (Latvia) Riga)
- September 3 – 10: 2022 UEFA Under-19 Futsal Championship in (Spain) Jaén

=== CONMEBOL ===
- January 29 – February 6: 2022 Copa América de Futsal in (Brazil) Rio de Janeiro
- April 30 – May 7: 2022 Copa Libertadores de Futsal in Argentina
- June 4 – 11: 2022 Copa Libertadores de Futsal Femenino in Bolivia

=== AFC ===
- September 25 – October 20: 2022 AFC Futsal Asian Cup in Kuwait

== Gymnastics ==
- March 10 – 13: 2022 Acrobatic Gymnastics World Championships in (Azerbaijan) Baku
- June 1 – 5: 2022 European Trampoline Championships in (Italy) Rimini
- June 15 – 19: 2022 Rhythmic Gymnastics European Championships in (Israel) Tel Aviv
- June 16 – 18: 2022 Aerobic Gymnastics World Championships in (Portugal) Guimarães
- August 11 – 21: 2022 European Women's Artistic Gymnastics Championships and 2022 European Men's Artistic Gymnastics Championships in (Germany) Munich
- September 14 – 17: 2022 European Championships in TeamGym in (Luxembourg) Luxemburg City
- September 14 – 19: 2022 Rhythmic Gymnastics World Championships in (Bulgaria) Sofia
- October 29 – November 6: 2022 World Artistic Gymnastics Championships in (United Kingdom) Liverpool
- November 16 – 19: 2022 Trampoline Gymnastics World Championships in (Bulgaria) Sofia

=== 2022 FIG Artistic Gymnastics World Cup series ===
World Cup series

- February 24 – 27: WC #1 in (Germany) Cottbus
- March 2 – 5: WC #2 in (Qatar) Doha
- March 13 – 20: WC #3 in (Egypt) Cairo
- March 31 – April 4: WC #4 in (Azerbaijan) Baku (final)

World Challenge Cup series

- May 26 – 29: WCC #1 in (Bulgaria) Varna
- June 9 – 12: WCC #2 in (Croatia) Osijek
- June 16 – 19: WCC #3 in (Slovenia) Koper
- September 24 & 25: WCC #4 in (France) Paris
- September 30 – October 2: WCC #5 in (Hungary) Szombathely
- October 7 – 9: WCC #6 in (Turkey) Mersin (final)

=== 2022 FIG Acrobatic Gymnastics World Cup series ===
- May 13 – 15: WC #1 in (Portugal) Maia
  - Men's Pair winners: (United States) Angel Felix & Braiden McDougall
  - Women's Pair winners: (Ukraine) Viktoria Kozlovska & Taisia Marchenko
  - Mixed Pair winners: (Belgium) Helena Heijens & Bram Roettger
  - Men's Group winners: (United Kingdom) Bradley Gold, Archie Goonesekera, Finlay Gray, Andrew Morris-Hunt
  - Women's Group winners: (Belgium) Kim Bergmans, Lise De Meyst, Bo Hollebosch
- June 3 – 5: WC #2 in (Poland) Rzeszów

=== 2022 FIG Tumbling and Trampoline Gymnastics World Cup series ===
- February 12 & 13: WC #1 in (Azerbaijan) Baku
  - Trampoline winners: (Belarus) Ivan Litvinovich (m) / (Russia) Irina Kundius (f)
  - Trampoline Synchro winners: Belarus (Andrei Builou & Ivan Litvinovich) (m) / Turkey (Sıla Karakuş & Livanur Yalçın) (f)
- May 27 & 28: WC #2 in (Italy) Rimini
- June 25 & 26: WC #3 in (Portugal) Coimbra
- July 1 & 2: WC #4 in (Switzerland) Arosa
- September 23 & 24: WC #5 in (Russia) Saint Petersburg

=== 2022 FIG Rhythmic Gymnastics World Cup series ===
- March 18 – 20: WC #1 in (Greece) Athens
- April 8 – 10: WC #2 in (Bulgaria) Sofia
- April 15 – 17: WC #3 in (Uzbekistan) Tashkent
- April 22 – 24: WC #4 in (Azerbaijan) Baku
- June 3 – 5: WC #5 in (Italy) Pesaro

World Challenge Cup series

- May 20 – 22: WCC #1 in (Spain) Pamplona
- May 27 – 29: WCC #2 in (Portugal) Portimão
- August 19 – 21: WCC #3 in (Russia) Moscow
- August 26 – 28: WCC #4 in (Romania) Cluj-Napoca
- September 2 – 4: WCC #5 in (Belarus) Minsk

=== 2022 FIG Aerobic Gymnastics World series ===
- March 25 – 27: WC #1 in (Portugal) Cantanhede
  - Individual winners: (Spain) Miquel Mañé (m) / (Brazil) Tamires Silva
  - Mixed Pairs winners: (Hungary) Dániel Bali & Fanni Mazacs
  - Trio winners: (Hungary) Dániel Bali, Balázs Farkas & Fanni Mazacs
  - Group winners: Italy
- April 23 & 24: WC #2 in (Japan) Tokyo
- May 13 & 14: WC #3 in (Portugal) Maia

== Handball ==
=== IHF ===
- June 22 – July 3: 2022 Women's Junior World Handball Championship in Slovenia
- August 3 – 14: 2022 IHF Women's Youth World Championship in Georgia
- October 17 – 23: 2022 IHF Men's Super Globe in Saudi Arabia

=== AHF ===
- January 18 – 31: 2022 Asian Men's Handball Championship in Dammam
  - In the final, Qatar defeated Bahrain, 29–24, to win their 5th title. Saudi Arabia took third place.
  - Qatar, Bahrain, Saudi Arabia, Iran and South Korea qualified for the 2023 World Men's Handball Championship.
- February 12 – 21: 2022 Asian Women's Junior Handball Championship in (Uzbekistan) Tashkent
- February 25 – March 7: 2021 Asian Women's Youth Handball Championship in (Kazakhstan) Almaty
- June 18 – 27: 2020 Asian Club League Handball Championship in (Qatar) Doha
- July 16 – 25: 2022 Asian Men's Youth Handball Championship in TBD
- August 13 – 22: 2022 Asian Men's Junior Handball Championship in TBD

=== EHF ===
- January 13 – 30: 2022 European Men's Handball Championship in Hungary and Slovakia
  - In the final, Sweden defeated Spain, 27–26, to win their 5th title. Denmark took third place.
  - Sweden along with Spain, Denmark qualified for the 2023 World Men's Handball Championship and for the 2024 European Men's Handball Championship.
  - France and Norway qualified for the 2023 World Men's Handball Championship.
- November 4 – 20: 2022 European Women's Handball Championship in Slovenia, North Macedonia and Montenegro

Club competitions

- September 15, 2021 – June 19: 2021–22 EHF Champions League (final four in (Germany) Cologne)
- September 11, 2021 – June 5: 2021–22 Women's EHF Champions League (final four in (Hungary) Budapest)
- August 28, 2021 – May 29: 2021–22 EHF European League
- October 16, 2021 – May 15: 2021–22 Women's EHF European League
- September 11, 2021 – May 29: 2021–22 EHF European Cup
- October 14, 2021 – ?: 2021–22 Women's EHF European Cup

Regional club competitions

- September 4, 2021 – ?: 2021–22 Baltic Handball League
- September 14, 2021 – ?: 2021–22 BENE-League Handball
- September 4, 2021 – ?: 2021–22 Women Handball International League

=== SCAHC ===
- January 25 – 29: 2022 South and Central American Men's Handball Championship in Recife
  - In the final, Brazil defeated Argentina, 20–17, to win their 1st title. Chile took third place.
  - Brazil, Argentina, Chile along Uruguay qualified for the 2023 World Men's Handball Championship.

== Horse racing ==
=== United States ===
US Triple Crown

- May 7: Kentucky Derby at Churchill Downs
- May 21: Preakness Stakes at (Maryland) Pimlico
- June 11: Belmont Stakes at (New York (state)) Belmont Park

Breeders Cup

- Nov 4–5: Breeders Cup at (Kentucky) Keenland

=== Hong Kong ===
Hong Kong Triple Crown

- January 23: Hong Kong Stewards' Cup in Hong Kong
  - Winner: (Australia) Zac Purton
- February 20: Hong Kong Gold Cup in Hong Kong
- May 22: Hong Kong Champions & Chater Cup in Hong Kong

== Ice climbing ==
- January 26–29: 2022 UIAA Ice Climbing World Championships in (Switzerland) Saas-Fee
  - Lead winners: (France) Louna Ladevant (m) / (Switzerland) Petra Klingler (f)
  - Speed winners: (Iran) Mohsen Beheshti Rad (m) / (Russia) Natalia Savitskaia (f)
- January 26–29: 2022 UIAA Ice Climbing World Youth Championships in (Switzerland) Saas-Fee
  - Lead U16 winners: (United States) Landers Gaydosh (m) / (Russia) Arina Kolegova (f)
  - Speed U16 winners: (Russia) Roman Shubin (m) / (Russia) Arina Kolegova (f)
  - Lead U19 winners: (United States) Keenan Griscom (m) / (Russia) Polina Bratukhina (f)
  - Speed U19 winners: (Russia) Danila Naumov (m) / (Russia) Anna Altsibeeva (f)
  - Lead U21 winners: (Russia) Ivan Loshchenko (m) / (Russia) Iuliia Filateva (f)
  - Speed U21 winners: (Russia) Nikita Glazyrin (m) / (Russia) Iuliia Filateva (f)
- February 4–6: 2022 UIAA Ice Climbing North American Championships in (United States) Ouray
- February 4–6: 2022 UIAA Ice Climbing North American Youth Championships in (United States) Ouray
- February 18–20: 2022 UIAA Ice Climbing European Championships in (Finland) Oulu
- February 18–20: 2022 UIAA Ice Climbing European Youth Championships in (Finland) Oulu

=== 2022 UIAA Ice Climbing World Cup ===
- February 25–27: WC #1 in (South Korea) Cheongsong
  - Cancelled
- March 4–6: WC #2 in (Russia) Tyumen
  - Cancelled
- March 11–13: WC #3 in (Russia) Kirov (final)
  - Cancelled

=== 2021–2022 UIAA Ice Climbing European Cup ===
- November 13, 2021: EC #1 in (Switzerland) Bern
  - Lead winners: (Russia) Nikolay Primerov (m) / (Switzerland) Sina Goetz (f)
- November 27, 2021: EC #2 in (Slovakia) Žilina
  - Lead winners: (Canada) David Bouffard (m) / (Poland) Olga Kosek (f)
- December 4, 2021: EC #3 in (Czech Republic) Brno
  - Lead winners: (France) Virgile Devin (m) / (Finland) Enni Bertling (f)
- December 11, 2021: EC #4 in (Netherlands) Utrecht
  - Lead winners: (France) Virgile Devin (m) / (Netherlands) Marianne van der Steen (f)
- December 11, 2021: EC #4 in (Netherlands) Utrecht
  - Lead winners: (France) Virgile Devin (m) / (Netherlands) Marianne van der Steen (f)
- January 22: EC #5 in (Liechtenstein) Malbun
  - Lead winners: (France) Louna Ladevant (m) / (Switzerland) Sina Goetz (f)
- February 18–20: EC #6 in (Finland) Oulu (final)

== Ice hockey ==
=== Ice Hockey World Championships ===
- March 3 – 9: 2022 IIHF World Championship Division IV in Bishkek
  - Final placements: (gold) : Kyrgyzstan, (silver) : Iran, (bronze) : Singapore, 4th: Malaysia, 5th: Kuwait
  - Kyrgyzstan, Iran, Singapore and Malaysia promoted to Division III B for 2023.
- March 21 – April 9: 2022 IIHF World Championship Division III in Kockelscheuer and Cape Town
  - Group A final placements: (gold) : United Arab Emirates, (silver) : Turkey, (bronze) : Turkmenistan, 4th: Chinese Taipei, 5th: Luxembourg
  - United Arab Emirates and Turkey promoted to Division II B for 2023.
  - Group B final placements: (gold) : South Africa, (silver) : Thailand, (bronze) : Bosnia and Herzegovina
  - South Africa and Thailand promoted to Division III A for 2023.
- April 18 – 30: 2022 IIHF World Championship Division II in Reykjavík and Zagreb
  - Group A final placements: (gold) : China, (silver) : Netherlands, (bronze) : Croatia, 4th: Spain, 5th: Israel
  - China promoted to Division I B for 2023.
  - Group B final placements: (gold) : Iceland, (silver) : Georgia, (bronze) : Belgium, 4th: Bulgaria, 5th: Mexico
  - Iceland promoted to Division II A for 2023.
- April 25 – May 8: 2022 IIHF World Championship Division I in Ljubljana and Tychy
  - Group A final placements: (gold) : Slovenia, (silver) : Hungary, (bronze) : Lithuania, 4th: South Korea, 5th: Romania
  - Slovenia and Hungary promoted to Top Division for 2023.
  - Group B final placements: (gold) : Poland, (silver) : Japan, (bronze) : Ukraine, 4th: Estonia, 5th: Serbia
  - Poland promoted to Division I A for 2023.
- May 13 – 29: 2022 IIHF World Championship in Tampere and Helsinki
  - Final placements: (gold) : Finland, (silver) : Canada, (bronze) : Czechia, 4th: United States
  - Italy and Great Britain relegated to Division I A for 2023.

=== IIHF World Women's Championship ===
- March 22 – April 9: 2022 IIHF Women's World Championship Division III in Sofia and Belgrade
  - Group A final placements: (gold) : Belgium, (silver) : Lithuania, (bronze) : Bulgaria
  - Belgium promoted to Division II B for 2023.
  - Group B final placements: (gold) : Estonia, (silver) : Serbia, (bronze) : Bosnia and Herzegovina, 4th: Israel
  - Estonia promoted to Division III A for 2023.
- April 3 – May 23: 2022 IIHF Women's World Championship Division II in Jaca and Zagreb
  - Group A final placements: (gold) : Great Britain, (silver) : Latvia, (bronze) : Spain, 4th: Chinese Taipei, 5th: Mexico
  - Great Britain promoted to Division I B for 2023.
  - Group B final placements: (gold) : Iceland, (silver) : Australia, (bronze) : Turkey, 4th: South Africa, 5th: Croatia
  - Iceland promoted to Division II A for 2023.
- April 8 – 30: 2022 IIHF Women's World Championship Division I in Katowice and Angers
  - Group A final placements: (gold) : France, (silver) : Norway, (bronze) : Slovakia, 4th: Austria, 5th: Netherlands
  - France promoted to Top Division for 2023.
  - Group B final placements: (gold) : China, (silver) : Poland, (bronze) : Italy, 4th: Kazakhstan, 5th: South Korea, 6th: Slovenia
  - China promoted to Division I A for 2023.
- August 26 – September 4: 2022 IIHF Women's World Championship in Herning and Frederikshavn
  - Final placements: (gold) : Canada, (silver) : United States, (bronze) : Czechia, 4th: Switzerland
  - Denmark relegated to Division I for 2023.

=== IIHF World Junior Championship ===
- December 26, 2021 – January 5: 2022 World Junior Ice Hockey Championships in (Canada) Edmonton and Red Deer, rescheduled to August 9 – 20, 2022.
  - On December 29, 2021, the IIHF Council cancelled the remainder of the tournament due to the ongoing COVID-19 pandemic and spread of the Omicron variant.
- December 12 – 18, 2021: 2022 World Junior Ice Hockey Championships – Division I in Hørsholm (Group A) and Tallinn (Group B)
  - Group A final placements: (gold) : Latvia, (silver) : Norway, (bronze) : Kazakhstan, 4th: Denmark, 5th: Hungary, Suspended: Belarus
  - Latvia promoted to Top Division for 2022 and 2023.
  - Note: Belarus placed 1st in Group A but was suspended from IIHF competitions. Runner-ups Latvia therefore got promoted to 1st.
  - Group B final placements: (gold) : France, (silver) : Slovenia, (bronze) : Japan, 4th: Ukraine, 5th: Estonia, 6th: Poland
  - France and Slovenia promoted to Division I A for 2023
- December 13 – 19, 2021 and January 10 – 16: 2022 World Junior Ice Hockey Championships – Division II in Brașov (Group A) and Belgrade (Group B)
  - Group A final placements: (gold) : Italy, (silver) : South Korea, (bronze) : Great Britain, 4th: Spain, 5th: Lithuania, 6th: Romania
  - Italy and South Korea promoted to Division I B for 2023.
  - Group B final placements: (gold) : Croatia, (silver) : Netherlands, (bronze) : Serbia, 4th: Belgium, 5th: Iceland
  - Croatia and Netherlands promoted to Division II A for 2023.
- January 6 – 16: 2022 World Junior Ice Hockey Championships – Division III in (Mexico) Queretaro, rescheduled to July 22 – 30, 2022.
  - On December 24, 2021, the tournament was cancelled due to the ongoing COVID-19 pandemic and spread of the Omicron variant.
- July 22 – 30: 2022 World Junior Ice Hockey Championships – Division III in Queretaro
  - Final placements: (gold) : Chinese Taipei, (silver) : Mexico, (bronze) : Australia, 4th: Israel
  - Chinese Taipei and Mexico promoted to Division II B for 2023.
- August 9 – 20: 2022 World Junior Ice Hockey Championships in Edmonton and Red Deer
  - Final placements: (gold) : Canada, (silver) : Finland, (bronze) : Sweden, 4th: Czechia

=== National Hockey League ===
- October 12 – April 30: 2021–22 NHL season
  - Presidents' Trophy and Eastern Conference winners: Florida Panthers
  - Western Conference winners: Colorado Avalanche
  - Art Ross Trophy winner: (Canada) Connor McDavid ( (Alberta) Edmonton Oilers)
- January 1: 2022 NHL Winter Classic at the Target Field in Minneapolis
  - The (Missouri) St. Louis Blues defeated the Minnesota Wild, 6–4.
- February 5: 2022 National Hockey League All-Star Game in (Nevada) Las Vegas
- May 2 – June 26: 2022 NHL Playoffs
  - The Colorado Avalanche def. the (Florida) Tampa Bay Lightning, 4–2 in games played, to win their third Stanley Cup championship.
- July 7 – 8: 2022 NHL entry draft in (Canada) Montreal

#1: (Slovakia) Juraj Slafkovský (to the (Quebec) Montreal Canadiens from (Finland) TPS)

=== Champions Hockey League ===
- August 26, 2021 – March 1: 2021–22 Champions Hockey League

=== IIHF Continental Cup ===
- September 24, 2021 – March 6: 2021–22 IIHF Continental Cup

=== Kontinental Hockey League ===
- September 1, 2021 – April 30: 2021–22 KHL season

=== Euro Hockey Tour ===
- November 10, 2021 – May 8: 2021–22 Euro Hockey Tour in (Finland) Helsinki, (Czech Republic) Prague, (Russia) Moscow

=== Hockey Europe ===
- September 11, 2021 –: (Austria) / (Italy) / (Slovenia) 2021–22 Alps Hockey League
- September 16, 2021 –: (Austria) / (Czech Republic) / (Hungary) / (Italy) / (Slovakia) / (Slovenia) 2021–22 ICE Hockey League season
- October 2, 2021 –: (Belgium) / (Netherlands) 2021–22 BeNe League

== Ice stock sport ==
- February 16 – 27: 2022 Icestocksport World Championships in (Italy) Klobenstein

== Judo ==
- August 7 – 14: 2022 World Judo Championships in (Uzbekistan) Tashkent

=== Judo World Tour ===
- January 28 – 30: (Portugal) 2022 Judo Grand Prix Almada
  - Extra-lightweight winners: (South Korea) Lee Ha-rim (m) / (Portugal) Catarina Costa (f)
  - Half-lightweight winners: (Moldova) Denis Vieru (m) / (Kosovo) Distria Krasniqi (f)
  - Lightweight winners: (Uzbekistan) Murodjon Yuldoshev (m) / (Brazil) Rafaela Silva (f)
  - Half-middleweight winners: (Belgium) Matthias Casse (m) / (Netherlands) Joanne van Lieshout (f)
  - Middleweight winners: (Netherlands) Jesper Smink (m) / (Croatia) Lara Cvjetko (f)
  - Half-heavyweight winners: (Portugal) Jorge Fonseca (m) / (South Korea) Yoon Hyun-ji (f)
  - Heavyweight winners: (South Korea) Kim Min-jong (m) / (South Korea) Kim Ha-yun (f)
- February 5 & 6: (France) 2022 Judo Grand Slam Paris
  - Extra-lightweight winners: (Japan) Ryuju Nagayama (m) / (Japan) Natsumi Tsunoda (f)
  - Half-lightweight winners: (Mongolia) Yondonperenlein Baskhüü (m) / (France) Amandine Buchard (f)
  - Lightweight winners: (Georgia (country)) Lasha Shavdatuashvili (m) / (Japan) Haruka Funakubo (f)
  - Half-middleweight winners: (Japan) Sotaro Fujiwara (m) / (Japan) Nami Nabekura (f)
  - Middleweight winners: (Japan) Sanshiro Murao (m) / (France) Margaux Pinot (f)
  - Half-heavyweight winners: (Belgium) Toma Nikiforov (m) / (France) Audrey Tcheuméo (f)
  - Heavyweight winners: (Mongolia) Odkhüügiin Tsetsentsengel (m) / (Japan) Wakaba Tomita (f)
- February 17 – 19: (Israel) 2022 Judo Grand Slam Tel Aviv
  - Extra-lightweight winners: (Ukraine) Artem Lesiuk (m) / (France) Shirine Boukli (f)
  - Half-lightweight winners: (Israel) Baruch Shmailov (m) / (France) Astride Gneto (f)
  - Lightweight winners: (Azerbaijan) Hidayat Heydarov (m) / (France) Priscilla Gneto (f)
  - Half-middleweight winners: (Belgium) Matthias Casse (m) / (Japan) Megumi Horikawa (f)
  - Middleweight winners: (Azerbaijan) Mammadali Mehdiyev (m) / (Japan) Shiho Tanaka (f)
  - Half-heavyweight winners: (Georgia (country)) Ilia Sulamanidze (m) / (Poland) Beata Pacut (f)
  - Heavyweight winners: (Georgia (country)) Guram Tushishvili (m) / (France) Romane Dicko (f)
- April 1 – 3: (Turkey) 2022 Judo Grand Slam Antalya
  - Extra-lightweight winners: (Chinese Taipei) Yang Yung-wei (m) / (Mongolia) Ganbaataryn Narantsetseg (f)
  - Half-lightweight winners: (Moldova) Denis Vieru (m) / (Hungary) Réka Pupp (f)
  - Lightweight winners: (Georgia (country)) Giorgi Terashvili (m) / (Canada) Jessica Klimkait (f)
  - Half-middleweight winners: (Brazil) Guilherme Schimidt (m) / (United Kingdom) Lucy Renshall (f)
  - Middleweight winners: (Cuba) Iván Felipe Silva Morales (m) / (France) Marie-Ève Gahié (f)
  - Half-heavyweight winners: (Portugal) Jorge Fonseca (m) / (Germany) Anna-Maria Wagner (f)
  - Heavyweight winners: (Georgia (country)) Guram Tushishvili (m) / (France) Léa Fontaine (f)
- June 3 – 5: (Georgia (country)) 2022 Judo Grand Slam Tbilisi

=== Judo Senior European Cup ===
- March 19 & 20: Senior European Cup #1 in (Latvia) Riga
- April 23 & 24: Senior European Cup #2 in (Croatia) Dubrovnik

=== Judo European Cup ===
- February 11 – 13: European Cup #1 in (Bosnia and Herzegovina) Sarajevo
  - Extra-lightweight winners: (Azerbaijan) Turan Bayramov (m) / (Turkey) Gülkader Şentürk (f)
  - Half-lightweight winners: (Turkey) Ejder Toktay (m) / (Switzerland) Binta Ndiaye (f)
  - Lightweight winners: (Germany) Michel Adam (m) / (Spain) Carla Ubasart Mascaró (f)
  - Half-middleweight winners: (France) Arnaud Aregba (m) / (Spain) Sarai Padilla (f)
  - Middleweight winners: (Germany) Martin Matijass (m) / (Croatia) Lara Cvjetko (f)
  - Half-heavyweight winners: (Italy) Enrico Bergamelli (m) / (Kosovo) Loriana Kuka (f)
  - Heavyweight winners: (Slovenia) Vito Dragič (m) / (France) Valentine Marchand (f)
- February 26 & 27: European Cup #2 in (Poland) Warsaw

=== Judo European Open ===
- March 5 & 6: European Open #1 in (Czech Republic) Prague

=== Judo African Open ===
- March 12 & 13: African Open #1 in (Tunisia) Tunis
- March 19 & 20: African Open #2 in (Algeria) Algiers

== Karate ==
- May 25 – 29: 2022 European Karate Championships in (Turkey) Gaziantep
- May 26 – 28: 2022 Pan American Karate Championships in Curaçao
- June 4 – 5: 2022 Oceania Karate Championships in New Caledonia

=== 2022 Karate1 Premier League ===
- February 18 – 20: #1 in (United Arab Emirates) Fujairah
  - Kata winners: (Turkey) Enes Özdemir (m) / (Japan) Kiyou Shimizu (f)
  - Men's −60 kg winner: (Jordan) Abdullah Hammad
  - Men's −67 kg winner: (Kazakhstan) Didar Amirali
  - Men's −75 kg winner: (Egypt) Abdalla Abdelaziz
  - Men's −84 kg winner: (Egypt) Youssef Badawy
  - Men's +84 kg winner: (Egypt) Hazeem Mohamed
  - Women's −50 kg winner: (Kazakhstan) Moldir Zhangbyrbay
  - Women's −55 kg winner: (Russia) Anna Chernysheva
  - Women's −61 kg winner: (Italy) Alessandra Mangiacapra
  - Women's −68 kg winner: (Azerbaijan) Irina Zaretska
  - Women's +68 kg winner: (France) Nancy Garcia
- April 22 – 24: #2 in (Portugal) Matosinhos
  - Kata winners: (Japan) Kakeru Nishiyama (m) / (Japan) Kiyou Shimizu (f)
  - Men's −60 kg winner: (Greece) Christos-Stefanos Xenos
  - Men's −67 kg winner: (France) Steven Da Costa
  - Men's −75 kg winner: (Italy) Daniele De Vivo
  - Men's −84 kg winner: (Netherlands) Brian Timmermans
  - Men's +84 kg winner: (Spain) Babacar Seck
  - Women's −50 kg winner: (Venezuela) Yorgelis Salazar
  - Women's −55 kg winner: (Ukraine) Anzhelika Terliuga
  - Women's −61 kg winner: (Ukraine) Anita Serogina
  - Women's −68 kg winner: (Italy) Silvia Semeraro
  - Women's +68 kg winner: (Croatia) Lucija Lesjak
- May 13 – 15: #3 in (Morocco) Rabat
  - Kata winners: (Japan) Kazumasa Moto (m) / (Japan) Hikaru Ono (f)
  - Men's −60 kg winner: (Morocco) Abdel Ali Jina
  - Men's −67 kg winner: (Greece) Dionysios Xenos
  - Men's −75 kg winner: (Egypt) Abdalla Abdelaziz
  - Men's −84 kg winner: (Egypt) Youssef Badawy
  - Men's +84 kg winner: (Egypt) Taha Tarek Mahmoud
  - Women's −50 kg winner: (Egypt) Reem Ahmed Salama
  - Women's −55 kg winner: (Ukraine) Anzhelika Terliuga
  - Women's −61 kg winner: (Egypt) Dahab Ali
  - Women's −68 kg winner: (Switzerland) Elena Quirici
  - Women's +68 kg winner: (Japan) Ayumi Uekusa
- September 2 – 4: #4 in (Azerbaijan) Baku

=== 2022 Karate1 Series A ===
- January 28 – 30: #1 in Pamplona
  - Kata winners: (Japan) Ryuji Moto (m) / (Spain) Gema Morales (f)
  - Kata Team winners: Kuwait (Mohammad Hussain, Sayed Salman Al-Mosawi, Mohammad Al-Mosawi) (m) / Spain (Raquel Roy Rubio, María López Pintado, Lidia Rodríguez Encabo) (f)
  - Men's −60 kg winner: (Italy) Danilo Greco
  - Men's −67 kg winner: (Russia) Ernest Sharafutdinov
  - Men's −75 kg winner: (France) Kilian Cizo
  - Men's −84 kg winner: (France) Dany Makamata
  - Men's +84 kg winner: (Czech Republic) Ondřej Bosák
  - Women's −50 kg winner: (Brazil) Valéria Kumizaki
  - Women's −55 kg winner: (Germany) Mia Bitsch
  - Women's −61 kg winner: (Switzerland) Elena Quirici
  - Women's −68 kg winner: (Netherlands) Lynn Snel
  - Women's +68 kg winner: (Russia) Tatiana Zyabkina
- June 10 – 12: #2 in (Egypt) Cairo
- September 23 – 25: #3 in (Chile) Temuco
- November 11 – 13: #4 in (China) TBD

== Kickboxing ==
International competitions

- September 16–25: WAKO Children, Cadet and Junior World Championship in (Republic of Ireland) Dublin
- November 11–20: WAKO Senior and Master European Championship in (Turkey) Antalya

=== 2022 WAKO World Cup ===
- March 3–6: WC #1 in (Republic of Ireland) Dublin
- May 5–8: WC #2 in (Turkey) Istanbul
- May 26–29: WC #3 in (Austria) Innsbruck
  - Cancelled
- June 1–5: WC #4 in (Hungary) Budapest
- June 16–19: WC #5 in (Italy) Rimini

=== 2022 WAKO European Cup ===
- January 21–23: EC #1 in (Italy) Lignano Sabbiadoro
  - Cancelled
- February 11–13: EC #2 in (Croatia) Karlovac
- March 18–20: EC #3 in (Serbia) Belgrade

== Korfball ==
- January 28 – 30: 2022 IKF Europa Shield in (Czech Republic) Prostějov
  - Event cancelled due Covid-19 situation in Europe.
- February 10 – 12: 2022 IKF Europa Cup in (Netherlands) Papendrecht
- April 15 – 17: 2022 IKF U19 World Korfball Championship in (Czech Republic) Kutná Hora
- July 2 – 3: 2022 U17 Korfball World Cup in (Netherlands) Eindhoven
- August 19 & 20: 2022 World Beach Korfball Championship in (Morocco) Nador

== Lacrosse ==
- June 29 – July 9: 2022 World Lacrosse Women's World Championship in (United States) Towson

=== National Lacrosse League ===
- December 3, 2021 — June 18, 2022: 2022 NLL season
  - MVP: Dhane Smith
  - NLL Cup: Colorado Mammoth

== Lifesaving ==
- September 25 – October 2: 2022 Lifesaving World Championships in (Italy) Riccione

== Luge ==
- January 15 & 16: 2022 FIL Junior European Luge Championships in (Austria) Bludenz
  - Men's singles winner: (Slovakia) Marián Skupek
  - Women's singles winner: (Germany) Melina Fischer
  - Men's doubles winners: (Germany) Moritz Jäger & Valentin Steudte
  - Women's doubles winners: (Latvia) Viktorija Ziediņa & Selina Zvilna
  - Team relay winners: Germany (Melina Fischer, Timon Grancagnolo, Moritz Jäger & Valentin Steudte)
- January 22 & 23: 2022 FIL European Luge Championships at the (Switzerland) St. Moritz-Celerina Olympic Bobrun
  - Men's singles winner: (Austria) Wolfgang Kindl
  - Women's singles winner: (Germany) Natalie Geisenberger
  - Men's doubles winners: (Germany) Toni Eggert & Sascha Benecken
  - Team Relay winners: Latvia (Elīna Ieva Vītola, Kristers Aparjods, Mārtiņš Bots & Roberts Plūme)
- January 22 & 23: 2022 FIL U23 European Luge Championships at the (Switzerland) St. Moritz-Celerina Olympic Bobrun
  - Men's U23 singles winner: (Italy) Leon Felderer
  - Women's U23 singles winner: (Latvia) Elīna Ieva Vītola
  - Men's U23 doubles winners: (Latvia) Mārtiņš Bots & Roberts Plūme
- January 28 & 29: 2022 FIL Junior World Championships in Winterberg
  - Men's singles winner: (Russia) Matvei Perestoronin
  - Women's singles winner: (Germany) Jessica Degenhardt
  - Men's doubles winners: (Latvia) Eduards Ševics-Mikeļševics & Lūkass Krasts
  - Women's doubles winners: (Germany) Luisa Romanenko & Pauline Patz
  - Team Relay winners: Germany (Jessica Degenhardt, Florian Müller, Moritz Jäger & Valentin Steudte)
- February 4 – 6: 2022 FIL Junior World Luge Natural Track Championships in (Italy) Jaufental
- February 10 – 13: FIL European Luge Natural Track Championships 2022 in (Italy) Laas

=== 2021–22 Luge World Cup ===
- November 20 & 21, 2021: WC #1 in (China) Yanqing
  - Men's singles winner: (Germany) Johannes Ludwig
  - Women's singles winner: (Austria) Madeleine Egle
  - Doubles winners: (Germany) Toni Eggert & Sascha Benecken
  - Team relay winners: Austria (Madeleine Egle, David Gleirscher, Thomas Steu & Lorenz Koller)
- November 27 & 28, 2021: WC #2 in Sochi
  - Men's singles winner: (Germany) Johannes Ludwig
  - Women's singles winner: (Germany) Anna Berreiter
  - Doubles winners: (Latvia) Andris Šics & Juris Šics
  - Team relay winners: Russia (Victoria Demchenko, Semen Pavlichenko, Andrei Bogdanov & Yuri Prokhorov)
- December 4 & 5, 2021: WC #3 in (Russia) Sochi
  - Men's singles winner: (Latvia) Kristers Aparjods
  - Women's singles winner: (Germany) Julia Taubitz
  - Doubles winners: (Russia) Andrei Bogdanov & Yuri Prokhorov
- December 11 & 12, 2021: WC #4 in Altenberg
  - Men's singles winners: (Austria) Wolfgang Kindl & (Germany) Max Langenhan (same time)
  - Women's singles winner: (Austria) Madeleine Egle
  - Doubles winners: (Austria) Thomas Steu & Lorenz Koller
  - Team relay winners: Germany (Julia Taubitz, Max Langenhan, Toni Eggert & Sascha Benecken)
- December 18 & 19, 2021: WC #5 in (Austria) Innsbruck
  - Men's singles winner: (Germany) Johannes Ludwig
  - Women's singles winner: (Germany) Julia Taubitz
  - Doubles winners: (Austria) Thomas Steu & Lorenz Koller
- January 1 & 2: WC #6 in (Germany) Winterberg
  - Men's singles winner: (Germany) Johannes Ludwig
  - Women's singles winner: (Germany) Julia Taubitz
  - Doubles winners: (Germany) Tobias Wendl & Tobias Arlt
  - Team relay winners: Latvia (Elīza Tīruma, Kristers Aparjods, Mārtiņš Bots & Roberts Plūme)
- January 8 & 9: WC #7 in (Latvia) Sigulda
  - Men's singles winner: (Latvia) Kristers Aparjods
  - Doubles winners: (Germany) Toni Eggert & Sascha Benecken
  - Women's singles winner: (Austria) Madeleine Egle
- January 15 & 16: WC #8 in Oberhof
  - Men's singles winner: (Germany) Johannes Ludwig
  - Doubles winners: (Germany) Toni Eggert & Sascha Benecken
  - Women's singles winner: (Austria) Madeleine Egle
  - Team relay winners: Germany (Julia Taubitz, Johannes Ludwig, Toni Eggert & Sascha Benecken)
- January 22 & 23: WC #9 in (Switzerland) St. Moritz
  - Doubles winners: (Germany) Toni Eggert & Sascha Benecken
  - Men's singles winner: (Austria) Wolfgang Kindl
  - Women's singles winner: (Germany) Natalie Geisenberger
  - Team relay winners: Latvia (Elīna leva Vītola, Kristers Aparjods, Mārtiņš Bots & Roberts Plūme)
- Doubles World Cup winners: (Germany) Toni Eggert & Sascha Benecken
- Men's singles World Cup winner: (Germany) Johannes Ludwig
- Women's singles World Cup winner: (Germany) Julia Taubitz
- Team relay World Cup winners: Germany

=== 2021–22 Sprint World Cup ===
- December 4 & 5, 2021: WC #1 in (Russia) Sochi
  - Men's singles winner: (Italy) Dominik Fischnaller
  - Women's singles winner: (Germany) Julia Taubitz
  - Doubles winners: (Latvia) Andris Šics & Juris Šics
- December 18 & 19, 2021: WC #2 in (Austria) Innsbruck
  - Men's singles winner: (Austria) Wolfgang Kindl
  - Women's singles winner: (Austria) Madeleine Egle
  - Doubles winners: (Germany) Toni Eggert & Sascha Benecken
- January 8 & 9: WC #3 in (Latvia) Sigulda
  - Men's singles winner: (Germany) Felix Loch
  - Women's singles winner: (Russia) Tatiana Ivanova
  - Doubles winners: (Latvia) Andris Šics & Juris Šics

=== 2021–22 Natural Track Luge World Cup ===
- January 8 & 9: WC #1 in (Austria) Umhausen
  - Men's singles winner: (Austria) Thomas Kammerlander
  - Women's singles winner: (Italy) Evelin Lanthaler
  - Doubles winners: (Italy) Patrick Pigneter & Florian Clara
  - Team winners: Italy (Evelin Lanthaler & Alex Gruber)
- January 15 & 16: WC #2 in (Austria) Umhausen
  - Men's singles winner: (Italy) Alex Gruber
  - Women's singles winner: (Italy) Evelin Lanthaler
  - Doubles winners: (Italy) Patrick Pigneter & Florian Clara
- January 22 & 23: WC #3 in (Romania) Vatra Dornei
  - Men's singles winner: (Austria) Thomas Kammerlander
  - Women's singles winner: (Italy) Evelin Lanthaler
  - Doubles winners: (Italy) Patrick Pigneter & Florian Clara
- January 29 & 30: WC #4 in Deutschnofen
  - Men's singles winner: (Italy) Alex Gruber
  - Women's singles winner: (Italy) Evelin Lanthaler
  - Doubles winners: (Italy) Patrick Pigneter & Florian Clara
  - Team winners: Italy (Evelin Lanthaler & Alex Gruber)
- February 19 & 20: WC #5 in (Austria) Mariazell
  - Men's singles winner: (Austria) Michael Scheikl
  - Women's singles winner: (Italy) Evelin Lanthaler
  - Doubles winners: (Italy) Patrick Pigneter & Florian Clara
- Men's singles World Cup winner: (Italy) Alex Gruber
- Women's singles World Cup winner: (Italy) Evelin Lanthaler
- Doubles World Cup winners: (Italy) Patrick Pigneter & Florian Clara

== Minigolf ==
- August 10 – 13: 2022 World Minigolf Championships in (Germany) Wanne-Eickel

== Modern pentathlon ==
=== 2022 Modern Pentathlon World Cup ===
- March 22 – 27: #1 in (Egypt) Cairo
  - Winners: (France) Christopher Patte (m) / (Italy) Elena Micheli (f)
  - Mixed Relay winners: (Egypt) Salma Abdelmaksoud & Mohanad Shaban
- April 25 – May 1: #2 in (Hungary) Budapest
  - Winners: (Czech Republic) Martin Vlach (m) / (Hungary) Michelle Gulyás (f)
  - Mixed Relay winners: (Egypt) Noureldin Karim & Haydy Morsy
- May 10 – 15: #3 in (Bulgaria) Albena
  - Winners: (South Korea) Jun Woong-tae (m) / (Lithuania) Ieva Serapinaitė (f)
  - Mixed Relay winners: (Mexico) Emiliano Hernández & Tamara Vega

== Motorsports ==
=== 2022 Formula One World Championship ===
- March 20: 2022 Bahrain Grand Prix
  - Winner: (Monaco) Charles Leclerc (Ferrari)
- March 27: (Saudi Arabia) 2022 Saudi Arabian Grand Prix
  - Winner: (Netherlands) Max Verstappen (Red Bull Racing-RBPT)
- April 10: (Australia) 2022 Australian Grand Prix
  - Winner: (Monaco) Charles Leclerc (Ferrari)
- April 24: (Italy) 2022 Emilia Romagna Grand Prix
  - Winner: (Netherlands) Max Verstappen (Red Bull Racing-RBPT)
- May 8: (United States) 2022 Miami Grand Prix
  - Winner: (Netherlands) Max Verstappen (Red Bull Racing-RBPT)
- May 22: (Spain) 2022 Spanish Grand Prix
  - Winner: (Netherlands) Max Verstappen (Red Bull Racing-RBPT)
- May 29: 2022 Monaco Grand Prix
  - Winner: (Mexico) Sergio Pérez (Red Bull Racing-RBPT)
- June 12: 2022 Azerbaijan Grand Prix
  - Winner: (Netherlands) Max Verstappen (Red Bull Racing-RBPT)
- June 19: (Canada) 2022 Canadian Grand Prix
  - Winner: (Netherlands) Max Verstappen (Red Bull Racing-RBPT)
- July 3: (United Kingdom) 2022 British Grand Prix
  - Winner: (Spain) Carlos Sainz Jr. (Ferrari)
- July 10: (Austria) 2022 Austrian Grand Prix
  - Winner: (Monaco) Charles Leclerc (Ferrari)
- July 24: (France) 2022 French Grand Prix
  - Winner: (Netherlands) Max Verstappen (Red Bull Racing-RBPT)
- July 31: (Hungary) 2022 Hungarian Grand Prix
  - Winner: (Netherlands) Max Verstappen (Red Bull Racing-RBPT)
- August 28: (Belgium) 2022 Belgian Grand Prix
  - Winner: (Netherlands) Max Verstappen (Red Bull Racing-RBPT)
- September 4: (Netherlands) 2022 Dutch Grand Prix
  - Winner: (Netherlands) Max Verstappen (Red Bull Racing-RBPT)
- September 9: (Italy) 2022 Italian Grand Prix
  - Winner: (Netherlands) Max Verstappen (Red Bull Racing-RBPT)
- October 2: 2022 Singapore Grand Prix
  - Winner: (Mexico) Sergio Pérez (Red Bull Racing-RBPT)
- October 9: (Japan) 2022 Japanese Grand Prix
  - Winner: (Netherlands) Max Verstappen (Red Bull Racing-RBPT)
- October 23: (United States) 2022 US Grand Prix
  - Winner: (Netherlands) Max Verstappen (Red Bull Racing-RBPT)
- October 30: 2022 Mexico City Grand Prix
  - Winner: (Netherlands) Max Verstappen (Red Bull Racing-RBPT)
- November 13: (Brazil) 2022 Brazilian Grand Prix
  - Winner: (United Kingdom) George Russel (Mercedes-AMG Petronas)
- November 20: (Emirate of Abu Dhabi) 2022 Abu Dhabi Grand Prix
  - Winner: (Netherlands) Max Verstappen (Red Bull Racing-RBPT)
- World Drivers' Champion: (Netherlands) Max Verstappen (Red Bull Racing-RBPT)
- World Constructors' Champion: Red Bull Racing-RBPT

=== 2021–22 Formula E World Championship ===
- January 28: (Saudi Arabia) 2022 Diriyah ePrix #1
  - Winner: (Netherlands) Nyck de Vries (Mercedes-EQ Formula E Team)
- January 29: (Saudi Arabia) 2022 Diriyah ePrix #2
  - Winner: (Switzerland) Edoardo Mortara (ROKiT Venturi Racing)
- February 12: 2022 Mexico City ePrix
  - Winner: (Germany) Pascal Wehrlein (Porsche Formula E Team)
- April 9: (Italy) 2022 Rome ePrix #1
  - Winner: (New Zealand) Mitch Evans (Jaguar Racing)
- April 10: (Italy) 2022 Rome ePrix #2
  - Winner: (New Zealand) Mitch Evans (Jaguar Racing)
- April 30: 2022 Monaco ePrix
  - Winner: (Belgium) Stoffel Vandoorne (Mercedes-EQ Formula E Team)
- May 14: (Germany) 2022 Berlin ePrix #1
  - Winner: (Switzerland) Edoardo Mortara (ROKiT Venturi Racing)
- May 15: (Germany) 2022 Berlin ePrix #2
  - Winner: (Netherlands) Nyck de Vries (Mercedes-EQ Formula E Team)
- June 4: (Indonesia) 2022 Jakarta ePrix
  - Winner: (New Zealand) Mitch Evans (Jaguar Racing)
- July 2: (Morocco) 2022 Marrakesh ePrix
  - Winner: (Switzerland) Edoardo Mortara (ROKiT Venturi Racing)
- July 16: (United States) 2022 New York City ePrix #1
  - Winner: (New Zealand) Nick Cassidy (Envision Racing)
- July 17: (United States) 2022 New York City ePrix #2
  - Winner: (Portugal) António Félix da Costa (DS Techeetah)

=== 2022 FIA World Endurance Championship ===
- March 18: (United States) 2022 1000 Miles of Sebring
  - Hypercar winners: (France) Alpine Elf Team ( (France) Nicolas Lapierre, (Brazil) André Negrão, (France) Matthieu Vaxivière)
  - LMP2 winners: (United States) United Autosports USA ( (United Kingdom) Paul di Resta, (United States) Josh Pierson, (United Kingdom) Oliver Jarvis)
  - LMGTE Pro winners: (Germany) Porsche GT Team ( (France) Kévin Estre, (Denmark) Michael Christensen)
  - LMGTE Am winners: (Canada) Northwest AMR ( (Canada) Paul Dalla Lana, (United Kingdom) David Pittard, (Denmark) Nicki Thiim)
- May 7: (Belgium) 2022 6 Hours of Spa-Francorchamps
  - Hypercar winners: (Japan) Toyota Gazoo Racing ( (United Kingdom) Mike Conway, (Japan) Kamui Kobayashi, (Argentina) José María López)
  - LMP2 winners: (Belgium) W Racing Team ( (Netherlands) Robin Frijns, (Indonesia) Sean Gelael, (Germany) René Rast)
  - LMGTE Pro winners: (Italy) AF Corse ( (United Kingdom) James Calado, (Italy) Alessandro Pier Guidi)
  - LMGTE Am winners: (Germany) Dempsey-Proton Racing ( (United Kingdom) Sebastian Priaulx, (Germany) Christian Ried, (United Kingdom) Harry Tincknell)

=== 2022 World Touring Car Cup ===
- May 7 – 8: Round #1 at (France) Circuit de Pau-Ville
  - Winners: (Argentina) Néstor Girolami (Race 1) / (Spain) Mikel Azcona (Race 2)
- May 26 – 28: Round #2 at (Germany) Nürburgring
  - Cancelled
- June 11 – 12: Round #3 at (Hungary) Hungaroring
  - Winners: (Spain) Mikel Azcona (Race 1) / (Uruguay) Santiago Urrutia (Race 2)
- June 25 – 26: Round #4 at (Spain) Aragón
  - Winners: (Belgium) Gilles Magnus (Race 1) / (Spain) Mikel Azcona (Race 2)
- July 2 – 3: Round #5 at (Portugal) Vila Real
  - Winners: (Uruguay) Santiago Urrutia (Race 1) / (United Kingdom) Robert Huff (Race 2)
- July 23 – 24: Round #6 at (Italy) Vallelunga
  - Winners: (Argentina) Néstor Girolami (Race 1) / (Belgium) Gilles Magnus (Race 2)

=== 2022 World Rally Championship ===
- January 20 – 23: (Monaco) Monte Carlo Rally
  - Overall winners: (France) Sébastien Loeb & (France) Isabelle Galmiche (M-Sport Ford WRT)
  - WRC-2 winners: (Norway) Andreas Mikkelsen & (Norway) Torstein Eriksen (Toksport WRT)
  - WRC-3 winners: (Finland) Sami Pajari & (Finland) Enni Mälkönen
- February 24 – 27: Rally Sweden
  - Overall winners: (Finland) Kalle Rovanperä & (Finland) Jonne Halttunen (Toyota Gazoo Racing WRT)
  - WRC-2 winners: (Norway) Andreas Mikkelsen & (Norway) Torstein Eriksen (Toksport WRT)
  - WRC-3 winners: (Finland) Lauri Joona & (Finland) Mikael Korhonen
- April 21 – 24: Croatia Rally
  - Overall winners: (Finland) Kalle Rovanperä & (Finland) Jonne Halttunen (Toyota Gazoo Racing WRT)
  - WRC-2 winners: (France) Yohan Rossel & (France) Benjamin Boulloud (PH Sport)
  - WRC-3 winners: (Hungary) Zoltán László & (Hungary) Tamás Kürti
- May 19 – 22: Rally de Portugal
  - Overall winners: (Finland) Kalle Rovanperä & (Finland) Jonne Halttunen (Toyota Gazoo Racing WRT)
  - WRC-2 winners: (France) Yohan Rossel & (France) Valentin Sarreaud (PH Sport)
  - WRC-3 winners: (Finland) Sami Pajari & (Finland) Enni Mälkönen
- June 2 – 5: (Italy) Rally Italia Sardegna
  - Overall winners: (Estonia) Ott Tänak & (Finland) Martin Järveoja (Hyundai Shell Mobis WRT)
  - WRC-2 winners: Nikolay Gryazin & Konstantin Aleksandrov (Toksport WRT)
  - WRC-3 winners: (Czech Republic) Jan Černý & (Czech Republic) Tomáš Střeska
- June 23 – 26: Safari Rally Kenya
  - Overall winners: (Finland) Kalle Rovanperä & (Finland) Jonne Halttunen (Toyota Gazoo Racing WRT)
  - WRC-2 winners: (Poland) Kajetan Kajetanowicz & (Poland) Maciej Szczepaniak
  - WRC-3 winners: (Kenya) Maxine Wahome & (Kenya) Murage Waigwa
- July 14 – 17: Rally Estonia
  - Overall winners: (Finland) Kalle Rovanperä & (Finland) Jonne Halttunen (Toyota Gazoo Racing WRT)
  - WRC-2 winners: (Norway) Andreas Mikkelsen & (Norway) Torstein Eriksen (Toksport WRT)
  - WRC-3 winners: (Finland) Sami Pajari & (Finland) Enni Mälkönen

=== 2022 World Rally-Raid Championship ===
- January 1 – 14: 2022 Dakar Rally in Saudi Arabia
  - Bikes winner: (United Kingdom) Sam Sunderland (Gas Gas Factory Team)
  - Quads winner: (France) Alexandre Giroud (Yamaha Racing – SMX – Drag'On)
  - Cars winner: (Qatar) Nasser Al-Attiyah (Toyota Gazoo Racing)
  - Light prototypes winner: (Chile) Francisco López Contardo (EKS – South Racing)
  - SSV winner: (United States) Austin Jones (Can-Am Factory South Racing)
  - Trucks winner: Dmitry Sotnikov (Kamaz Master)
  - Classics winner: (France) Serge Mogno (Team FSO)
- March 5 – 10: Abu Dhabi Desert Challenge in United Arab Emirates
  - Bikes winner: (United Kingdom) Sam Sunderland (Gas Gas Factory Team)
  - Cars winner: (France) Stéphane Peterhansel (Audi RS Q e-tron)
  - T3 winner: (Chile) Francisco López Contardo (EKS – South Racing)
  - T4 winner: (Poland) Marek Goczał (Cobant-Energylandia Rally Team
  - T5 winner: (Netherlands) Kees Koolen (Iveco PowerStar)

=== 2022 Extreme E Championship ===
- February 19 – 20: Desert X-Prix in (Saudi Arabia) Neom
  - Winners: (Germany) Rosberg X Racing ( (Sweden) Johan Kristoffersson & (Sweden) Mikaela Åhlin-Kottulinsky)

=== 2022 FIA World Cup for Cross-Country Bajas ===
- February 11 – 13: Baja Russia – Northern Forest
  - Winners: (Russia) Vladimir Vasilyev & (Latvia) Oleg Uperenko (Mini Cooper Countryman)
- February 17 – 19: Jordan Baja
  - Winners: (Saudi Arabia) Saleh Alsaif & (Russia) Egor Okhotnikov (BRP Can-Am Maverick X3)

=== 2022 FIM Bajas World Cup ===
- February 17 – 19: Jordan Baja
  - Winner: (United Arab Emirates) Mohammed Al Balooshi
- March 24 – 26: Qatar International Baja
  - Winner: (Poland) Konrad Dąbrowski
- May 6 – 8: (Portugal) Baja do Oeste
  - Winner: (Portugal) Micael Simão

=== 2022 MotoGP World Championship ===
- March 6: Grand Prix of Qatar
  - MotoGP winner: (Italy) Enea Bastianini
  - Moto2 winner: (Italy) Celestino Vietti
  - Moto3 winner: (Italy) Andrea Migno
- March 20: Pertamina Grand Prix of Indonesia
  - MotoGP winner: (Portugal) Miguel Oliveira
  - Moto2 winner: (Thailand) Somkiat Chantra
  - Moto3 winner: (Italy) Dennis Foggia
- April 3: Gran Premio Michelin de la República Argentina
  - MotoGP winner: (Spain) Aleix Espargaró
  - Moto2 winner: (Italy) Celestino Vietti
  - Moto3 winner: (Spain) Sergio García
- April 10: (United States) Red Bull Grand Prix of the Americas
  - MotoGP winner: (Italy) Enea Bastianini
  - Moto2 winner: (Italy) Tony Arbolino
  - Moto3 winner: (Spain) Jaume Masià
- April 24: Grande Prémio Tissot de Portugal
  - MotoGP winner: (France) Fabio Quartararo
  - Moto2 winner: (United States) Joe Roberts
  - Moto3 winner: (Spain) Sergio García
- May 1: (Spain) Gran Premio Red Bull de España
  - MotoGP winner: (Italy) Francesco Bagnaia
  - Moto2 winner: (Japan) Ai Ogura
  - Moto3 winner: (Spain) Izan Guevara
  - MotoE winner: (Brazil) Eric Granado (both races)
- May 15: Shark Grand Prix de France
  - MotoGP winner: (Italy) Enea Bastianini
  - Moto2 winner: (Spain) Augusto Fernández
  - Moto3 winner: (Spain) Jaume Masià
  - MotoE winner: (Italy) Mattia Casadei (Race 1) / (Switzerland) Dominique Aegerter (Race 2)
- May 29: (Italy) Gran Premio d'Italia Oakley
  - MotoGP winner: (Italy) Francesco Bagnaia
  - Moto2 winner: (Spain) Pedro Acosta
  - Moto3 winner: (Spain) Sergio García
  - MotoE winner: (Switzerland) Dominique Aegerter (Race 1) / (Italy) Matteo Ferrari (Race 2)
- June 5: (Catalonia) Gran Premi Monster Energy de Catalunya
  - MotoGP winner: (France) Fabio Quartararo
  - Moto2 winner: (Italy) Celestino Vietti
  - Moto3 winner: (Spain) Izan Guevara

=== 2022 Superbike World Championship ===
- April 9 & 10: Round #1 in (Spain) MotorLand Aragón
  - WorldSBK winners: (United Kingdom) Jonathan Rea (Race 1) / (Spain) Álvaro Bautista (SP Race & Race 2)
  - WorldSSP winners: (Italy) Lorenzo Baldassarri (Race 1) / (Switzerland) Dominique Aegerter (Race 2)
- April 23 & 24: Round #2 in (Netherlands) Assen
  - WorldSBK winners: (United Kingdom) Jonathan Rea (Race 1 & SP Race) / (Spain) Álvaro Bautista (Race 2)
  - WorldSSP winners: (Switzerland) Dominique Aegerter (both races)
- May 21 & 22: Round #3 in (Portugal) Estoril
  - WorldSBK winners: (Spain) Álvaro Bautista (Race 1) / (United Kingdom) Jonathan Rea (SP Race & Race 2)
  - WorldSSP winners: (Switzerland) Dominique Aegerter (both races)

=== 2022 FIM Motocross World Championship ===
- February 27: (United Kingdom) MXGP of Great Britain
  - MXGP winners: (Slovenia) Tim Gajser (Race 1) / (Spain) Jorge Prado (Race 2)
  - MX2 winner: (Germany) Simon Längenfelder (both races)
- March 6: (Lombardy) MXGP of Lombardia
  - MXGP winners: (Spain) Jorge Prado (Race 1) / (Slovenia) Tim Gajser (Race 2)
  - MX2 winner: (Belgium) Jago Geerts (both races)
- March 20: MXGP of Argentina
  - MXGP winners: (France) Maxime Renaux (Race 1) / (Slovenia) Tim Gajser (Race 2)
  - MX2 winners: (Belgium) Jago Geerts (Race 1) / (France) Tom Vialle (Race 2)
- April 3: MXGP of Portugal
  - MXGP winners: (Spain) Jorge Prado (Race 1) / (Slovenia) Tim Gajser (Race 2)
  - MX2 winners: (France) Tom Vialle (Race 1) / (Belgium) Jago Geerts (Race 2)
- April 10: MXGP of Trentino
  - MXGP winner: (Slovenia) Tim Gajser (both races)
  - MX2 winner: (France) Tom Vialle (both races)
- April 24: MXGP of Latvia
  - MXGP winner: (Slovenia) Tim Gajser (both races)
  - MX2 winner: (Belgium) Jago Geerts (both races)
- May 8: MXGP of Italy
  - MXGP winner: (Slovenia) Tim Gajser (both races)
  - MX2 winners: (Belgium) Jago Geerts (Race 1) / (France) Tom Vialle (Race 2)
- May 15: (Sardinia) MXGP of Sardegna
  - MXGP winner: (Netherlands) Calvin Vlaanderen (both races)
  - MX2 winners: (Belgium) Jago Geerts (Race 1) / (France) Tom Vialle (Race 2)
- May 29: MXGP of Spain
  - MXGP winner: (France) Maxime Renaux (both races)
  - MX2 winners: (France) Tom Vialle (both races)
- June 5: MXGP of France
  - MXGP winners: (Switzerland) Jeremy Seewer (Race 1) / (Netherlands) Glenn Coldenhoff (Race 2)
  - MX2 winners: (France) Tom Vialle (Race 1) / (France) Thibault Benistant (Race 2)
- June 12: MXGP of Germany
  - MXGP winners: (Slovenia) Tim Gajser (Race 1) / (Switzerland) Jeremy Seewer (Race 2)
  - MX2 winners: (France) Tom Vialle (Race 1) / (France) Thibault Benistant (Race 2)
- June 26: MXGP of Indonesia
  - MXGP winner: (Slovenia) Tim Gajser (both races)
  - MX2 winner: (France) Tom Vialle (both races)
- July 17: MXGP of Czech Republic
  - MXGP winners: (Switzerland) Jeremy Seewer (Race 1) / (France) Maxime Renaux (Race 2)
  - MX2 winners: (France) Thibault Benistant (Race 1) / (Belgium) Jago Geerts (Race 2)
- July 24: MXGP of Flanders
  - MXGP winners: (Netherlands) Brian Bogers (Race 1) / (Netherlands) Glenn Coldenhoff (Race 2)
  - MX2 winners: (Netherlands) Kay de Wolf (Race 1) / (Belgium) Jago Geerts (Race 2)

=== 2022 FIM SuperEnduro World Championship ===
- December 4, 2021: #1 in (Poland) Łódź
  - Winner: (United Kingdom) Billy Bolt
  - Juniors winner: (Poland) Dominik Olszowy
- February 5: #2 in (Hungary) Budapest
  - Winner: (United Kingdom) Billy Bolt
- March 3: #3 in (Israel) Jerusalem
  - Winner: (United Kingdom) Billy Bolt
- March 19: #4 in (Germany) Riesa
  - Winner: (United Kingdom) Billy Bolt
- March 20: #5 in (Germany) Riesa
  - Winner: (United Kingdom) Billy Bolt

=== 2022 AMA Supercross Championship ===
- January 8: #1 in (California) Anaheim
  - 450SX winner: (Germany) Ken Roczen
  - 250SX winner: (United States) Christian Craig
- January 15: #2 in (California) Oakland
  - 450SX winner: (United States) Jason Anderson
  - 250SX winner: (United States) Christian Craig
- January 22: #3 in (California) San Diego
  - 450SX winner: (United States) Chase Sexton
  - 250SX winner: (United States) Michael Mosiman
- January 29: #4 in (California) Anaheim
  - 450SX winner: (United States) Eli Tomac
  - 250SX winner: (United States) Christian Craig
- February 5: #5 in (Arizona) Glendale
  - 450SX winner: (United States) Eli Tomac
  - 250SX winner: (Australia) Hunter Lawrence
- February 12: #6 in (California) Anaheim
  - 450SX winner: (United States) Jason Anderson
  - 250SX winner: (United States) Christian Craig
- February 19: #7 in (Minnesota) Minneapolis
  - 450SX winner: (United States) Jason Anderson
  - 250SX winner: (Australia) Jett Lawrence
- February 26: #8 in (Texas) Arlington
  - 450SX winner: (United States) Eli Tomac
  - 250SX winner: (United States) Cameron McAdoo
- March 5: #9 in (Florida) Daytona
  - 450SX winner: (United States) Eli Tomac
  - 250SX winner: (Australia) Jett Lawrence
- March 12: #10 in (Michigan) Detroit
  - 450SX winner: (United States) Eli Tomac
  - 250SX winner: (Australia) Jett Lawrence
- March 19: #11 in (Indiana) Indianapolis
  - 450SX winner: (United States) Eli Tomac
  - 250SX winner: (Australia) Jett Lawrence
- March 26: #12 in (Washington (state)) Seattle
  - 450SX winner: (United States) Eli Tomac
  - 250SX winner: (Australia) Hunter Lawrence
- April 9: #13 in (Missouri) St. Louis
  - 450SX winner: (France) Marvin Musquin
  - 250SX winner: (United States) RJ Hampshire
- April 16: #14 in (Georgia (country)) Hampton
  - 450SX winner: (United States) Jason Anderson
  - 250SX winner: (Australia) Hunter Lawrence
- April 23: #15 in (Massachusetts) Foxborough
  - 450SX winner: (United States) Jason Anderson
  - 250SX winner: (Australia) Jett Lawrence
- April 30: #16 in (Colorado) Denver
  - 450SX winner: (United States) Jason Anderson
  - 250SX winner: (Australia) Hunter Lawrence
- May 7: #17 in (Utah) Salt Lake City
  - 450SX winner: (United States) Jason Anderson
  - 250SX winner: (United States) Nate Thrasher

=== 2022 FIM Ice Speedway World Championship ===
- February 12 & 13: #1 in (Russia) Tolyatti
  - Winner: (Russia) Nikita Bogdanov (2 times)
- April 2 & 3: #2 in (Netherlands) Heerenveen
  - Winner: (Sweden) Martin Haarahiltunen (2 times)

=== 2022 Speedway Grand Prix ===
- April 30: #1 in (Croatia) Goričan
  - Winner: (Poland) Bartosz Zmarzlik
- May 14: #2 in (Poland) Warsaw
  - Winner: (Australia) Max Fricke
- May 28: #3 in (Czech Republic) Prague
  - Winner: (Slovakia) Martin Vaculík
- June 4: #4 in (Germany) Teterow
  - Winner: (Poland) Patryk Dudek

=== 2022 FIM Supermoto World Championship ===
- April 17: #1 in (Italy) Busca
  - Winner: (Germany) Marc Reiner Schmidt
- May 8: #2 in (Spain) Alcarràs
  - Winner: (Brazil) Diogo Moreira

=== 2022 FIM Sidecar Motocross World Championship ===
- April 24: #1 in (Netherlands) Markelo
  - Winners: (Netherlands) Etienne Bax & (Czech Republic) Ondřej Čermák
- May 22: #2 in (Netherlands) Markelo
  - Winners: (Netherlands) Etienne Bax & (Czech Republic) Ondřej Čermák

=== 2022 FIM Enduro World Championship ===
- May 6 – 8: EnduroGP of Spain
  - Stage 1 winner: (Italy) Andrea Verona
  - Stage 2 winner: (Spain) Josep García
- May 13 – 15: EnduroGP of Portugal
  - Stage 1 winner: (Australia) Wil Ruprecht
  - Stage 2 winner: (Australia) Wil Ruprecht

== Netball ==
International tournaments

Date	Tournament	Winners	Runners up
15–19 January	2022 Netball Quad Series	Australia	England
12–18 February	2022 ECCB International Netball Series	Saint Vincent and the Grenadines	Saint Lucia
12–15 May	2022 Europe Netball Open Challenge	Republic of Ireland	United Arab Emirates
19–23 July	2023 Netball World Cup qualification – Oceania	Tonga	Fiji
29 Jul–7 Aug	2022 Commonwealth Games	Australia	Jamaica
21–27 August	2023 Netball World Cup qualification – Africa	South Africa	Malawi
3–11 September	2022 Asian Netball Championships	Sri Lanka	Singapore
12–23 October	2022 Taini Jamison Trophy Series	New Zealand	Jamaica
5–9 October	2022 England Uganda netball series	England	Uganda
12–16 October	2023 Netball World Cup Regional Qualifier – Europe	Wales	Scotland
16–21 October	2023 Netball World Cup Regional Qualifier – Americas	Jamaica	Trinidad and Tobago
12–23 October	2022 Constellation Cup	Australia	New Zealand
26 Oct–3 Nov	2022 Australia England netball series	Australia	England
5–6 November	2022 Fast5 Netball World Series	Australia	South Africa
5–6 November	2022 Men's Fast5 Netball World Series	Australia	New Zealand
12–23 October	2022 SPAR Diamond Challenge	South Africa	Scotland

Major national leagues

Host	League	Winners	Runners up
Australia	Suncorp Super Netball	West Coast Fever	Melbourne Vixens
New Zealand	ANZ Premiership	Central Pulse	Northern Stars
United Kingdom	Netball Superleague	Manchester Thunder	Loughborough Lightning

== Orienteering ==
- March 13 – 19: 2022 World Ski Orienteering Championships in (Finland) Kemi
- June 26 – 30: 2022 World Orienteering Championships in Denmark
- July 15 – 20: 2022 World MTB Orienteering Championships in (Sweden) Falun
- July 19 – 23: 2022 World Trail Orienteering Championships in (Poland) Jelenia Góra

Continental championships

- May 18 – 22: 2022 European MTB Orienteering Championships in (Lithuania) Ignalina

=== 2022 Orienteering World Cup ===
- May 26 – 29: Round 1 in Borås
  - Sprint winners: (Norway) Kasper Fosser (m) / (Sweden) Tove Alexandersson (f)
  - Knock-out sprint winners: (Switzerland) Matthias Kyburz (m) / (Sweden) Tove Alexandersson (f)
  - Sprint relay winners: Sweden 2 (Lina Strand, Martin Regborn, Emil Svensk, Karolin Ohlsson)

== Parkour ==
- October 14 – 16: 2022 Parkour World Championships in (Japan) Tokyo

== Pickleball ==
- April 22 – 30: 2022 Minto US Open Pickleball Championships in Naples, Florida
- June 29 – July 3: 2022 English Open Pickleball Championships, Southampton, England
- July: Pickleball accepted as an exhibition sport at the 2022 Maccabiah Games
- August 25 – 28: 2022 French Open Pickleball Championships in Saint-Raphaël, France
- September 9 – 11: 2022 Italian Open Pickleball Championships in Tocco da Casauria, Italy
- November 5 – 13: 2022 Margaritaville USA Pickleball National Championships in Indian Wells, California

== Powerboat racing ==
=== 2022 UIM XCAT World Championship ===
- March 4 – 6: #1 in (United Arab Emirates) Fujairah
  - Race 1 winners: (Italy) Giovanni Carpitella & (Australia) Darren Nicholson (222 Offshore)
  - Race 2 winners: (Monaco) Tomaso Polli & (Monaco) Matteo Nicolini (Six)

=== 2022 UIM V2 Powerboat World Championship ===
- April 22 – 24: #1 in (Malta) St. Paul's Bay
  - Winners: (Malta) El Diablo (Race 1) / (Malta) Freccia Blu (Races 2 & 3)

=== 2022 Formula 500 World Championship ===
- May 14 & 15: #1 in (Czech Republic) Jedovnice
  - Winner: (Hungary) Attila Havas

=== 2022 Formula 250 World Championship ===
- May 14 & 15: #1 in (Czech Republic) Jedovnice
  - Winner: (Hungary) Péter Bodor

=== 2022 Formula 125 World Championship ===
- May 14 & 15: #1 in (Czech Republic) Jedovnice
  - Winner: (Estonia) Joonas Lember

== Powerlifting ==
- May 21 – 29: 2022 World Classic & Equipped Bench Press Championship in (Kazakhstan) Almaty
- June 6 – 12: 2022 World Classic Open Powerlifting Championships in (South Africa) Sun City
- November 14 – 20: 2022 World Equipped Open Powerlifting Championships in (Denmark) Viborg

== Racquetball ==
- August 19 – 27: 2022 Racquetball World Championships in (Mexico) San Luis Potosí

=== 2022 International Racquetball Tour ===
Grand Slam

- January 20 – 23: 2022 Suivant Consulting Grand Slam in (Georgia (U.S. state)) Lilburn
  - Singles: (Mexico) Andree Parrilla def. (Canada) Kane Waselenchuk, 14–15, 15–2, 11–10.
  - Doubles: (Bolivia) Conrrado Moscoso & (Bolivia) Roland Keller Vargas def. (Mexico) Rodrigo Montoya & (Mexico) Javier Mar, 15–14, 15–14.

Tier 1

- March 10 – 13: 43rd Lewis Drug Pro/Am in (South Dakota) Sioux Falls

Tier 3

- January 14 – 16: 2022 Wintergreen Classic in (Maryland) Millersville
  - (Mexico) Daniel de la Rosa def. (Colombia) Mario Mercado, 9–15, 15–10, 11–5.

Tier 4

- March 25 & 26: 2022 Warhawk Open in (Louisiana) Monroe

Tier 5

- January 7 & 8: 2022 Racquetball Blizzard Tournament in (Missouri) St. Louis
  - (Iowa) Andrew Gleason def. (Illinois) Blase Zera, 15–8, 15–1.
- January 28 – 30: 2022 NRT Kick Off Tournament in (Nebraska) Omaha
  - (Colorado) Adam Manilla def. (Minnesota) John Goth, 15–5, 15–8.
- February 4 & 5: 2022 Midwest Racquetball Championships in (Missouri) St. Louis
- February 25 – 27: Peachtree OPEN Championships in (Georgia (U.S. state)) Lilburn

=== 2022 Ladies Professional Racquetball Tour ===
Super MAX Slam

- June 9 – 12: 2022 TeamRoot.Com Super MAX Slam! in (Kansas) Overland Park

Grand Slam

- May 12 – 15: 2022 Sweet Caroline Open in (South Carolina) Greenville

Tier 1

- February 17 – 19: 2022 Vero Beach Open in (Florida) Vero Beach
- March 4 – 6: 2022 Boston Open in (Massachusetts) Boston
- April 29 – May 1: 2022 Battle at the Alamo in (Texas) San Antonio

Outdoor

- March 24 – 27: 2022 Beach Bash in (Florida) Hollywood

== Racketlon ==
- August 19 – 22: 2022 FIR World Championships Juniors & Seniors in (Austria) Vienna
- August 24 – 28: 2022 FIR World Championships Elite & Amateurs in (Austria) Graz

=== 2022 FIR World Tour ===
- March 4 – 6: IWT French Open in (France) Montreuil
- March 18 – 20: CHA Spanish Open in (Spain) Elche
- April 8 – 10: CHA Nick Matthew Steel City Open in (United Kingdom) Sheffield
- April 23 & 24: CHA Moscow Open in Russia
- June 24 – 26: IWT Swiss Open in (Switzerland) Zürich
- July 8 – 10: IWT Latvian Open in (Latvia) Riga
- July 22 – 24: IWT London Open in (England) Roehampton
- August 5 – 7: IWT German Open in (Germany) Nußloch
- October 14 & 15: CHA Romanian Open in (Romania) Bucharest
- October 28 – November 6: IWT Indian Open & CHA in (India) TBD
- November 11 – 13: IWT Czech Open in (Czech Republic) Prague

== Ringette ==
- October 31 – November 6: 2022 World Ringette Championships in (Finland) Espoo

== Rowing ==
- January 29 & 30: 2022 European Rowing Indoor Championships in (Sweden) Jönköping
  - Competition cancelled.
- February 25 & 26: 2022 World Rowing Indoor Championships in (Germany) Hamburg
- August 11 – 14: 2022 European Rowing Championships in (Germany) Munich
- September 18 – 25: 2022 World Rowing Championships in (Czech Republic) Račice
- October 7 – 9: 2022 World Rowing Coastal Championships in (United Kingdom) Saundersfoot
- October 14 – 16: 2022 World Rowing Beach Sprint Finals in (United Kingdom) Saundersfoot

== Rugby league ==
- October 15 – November 19: 2021 Rugby League World Cup in England

== Rugby sevens ==
- September 9 – 11: 2022 Rugby World Cup Sevens in (South Africa) Cape Town

=== 2021–22 World Rugby Sevens Series ===
- November 26 & 27, 2021: Dubai Sevens I in (United Arab Emirates) Dubai
  - Winners: South Africa, 2nd: United States, 3rd: Argentina, 4th: Fiji
- December 3 & 4, 2021: Dubai Sevens II in (United Arab Emirates) Dubai
  - Winners: South Africa, 2nd: Australia, 3rd: Argentina, 4th: France
- January 21 – 23: Spain Sevens I in Málaga
  - Winners: South Africa, 2nd: Argentina, 3rd: England, 4th: Australia
- January 28 – 30: Spain Sevens II in Sevilla
  - Winners: South Africa, 2nd: Australia, 3rd: Argentina, 4th: Ireland
- April 9 & 10: Singapore Sevens in Singapore
  - Winners: Fiji, 2nd: New Zealand, 3rd: Australia, 4th: Ireland
- April 16 & 17: Canada Sevens in Vancouver
  - Winners: Argentina, 2nd: Fiji, 3rd: Australia, 4th: Samoa
- May 20 – 22: France Sevens in Toulouse
  - Winners: Fiji, 2nd: Ireland, 3rd: France, 4th: Samoa

=== 2021–22 World Rugby Women's Sevens Series ===
- November 26 – 27, 2021: Dubai Women's Sevens I in (United Arab Emirates) Dubai
  - Winners: Australia, 2nd: Fiji, 3rd: France, 4th: Russia
- December 3 – 4, 2021: Dubai Women's Sevens II in (United Arab Emirates) Dubai
  - Winners: Australia, 2nd: Fiji, 3rd: France, 4th: Russia
- January 21 – 23: Spain Sevens I in Málaga
  - Winners: United States, 2nd: Russia, 3rd: Australia, 4th: France
- January 28 – 30: Spain Sevens II in Sevilla
  - Winners: Australia, 2nd: Ireland, 3rd: England, 4th: United States
- April 30 – May 1: Canada Women's Sevens in Langford
  - Winners: Australia, 2nd: New Zealand, 3rd: Ireland, 4th: France
- May 20 – 22: France Women's Sevens in Toulouse
  - Winners: New Zealand, 2nd: Australia, 3rd: Fiji, 4th: Ireland
- Final positions: (gold) Australia, (silver) France, (bronze) Fiji

== Rugby Union ==
- October 8 – November 21: 2021 Rugby World Cup in New Zealand
- February 5 – March 19: 2022 Six Nations Championship
- February 5 – March 19: 2022 Women's Six Nations Championship
- September 24, 2021 – June 23/24/25: (Ireland) / (Italy) / (Scotland) / (South Africa) / (Wales) 2021–22 United Rugby Championship
- July 9 – 18: 2022 Oceania Rugby Women's Championship

=== Rugby Europe ===
- February 5 – March 20: (Georgia (country)) / (Netherlands) / (Portugal) / (Romania) / (Russia) / (Spain) 2022 Rugby Europe Championship
- October 9, 2021 – TBD: (Belgium) / (Germany) / (Lithuania) / (Poland) / (Switzerland) / (Ukraine) 2021–22 Rugby Europe Trophy

Club competitions

- December 10, 2021 – May 28: (England) / (France) / (Ireland) / (Scotland) / (Wales) 2021–22 European Rugby Champions Cup (final in (France) Marseille)
- December 10, 2021 – May 27: (England) / (France) / (Italy) / (Scotland) / (Wales) 2021–22 EPCR Challenge Cup (final in (France) Marseille)

== Sailing ==
- February 18 – 23: 2022 Raceboard European Championships in (Portugal) Vilamoura
- April 11 – 16: 2022 Windsurfing European Championships in (Italy) Cagliari
- April 12 – 16: 2022 Zoom8 European Championships in (Austria) Mörbisch am See
- April 14 – 21: 2022 U21 Laser and Laser Radial European Championships in (France) Hourtin
- April 17 – 23: 2022 Techno 293 and 293 Plus European Championships in (Italy) Cagliari
- April 29 – May 6: 2022 A-Catamaran World Championship in (United States) Houston
  - Open discipline standings: (gold) (United States) Ravi Parent, (silver) (Poland) Jakub Surowiec, (bronze) (United States) Riley Gibbs
  - Classic discipline standings: (gold) (Australia) Andrew Landenberger, (silver) (Spain) Micky Todd, (bronze) (Australia) Andreas Landenberger
- April 29 – May 6: 2022 Optimist Asian & Oceanian American Championship in (South Korea) Yeosu
- May 9 – 15: 2022 Melges 24 World Championship in (United States) Fort Lauderdale
  - Final standings: (gold) (United States) Raza Mixta, (silver) (United States) Zenda Express, (bronze) (United States) Monsoon
- May 10 – 24: 2022 Hobie 16 World Championship in (Spain)
- May 12 – 16: 2022 Lightning Master World Championship in (United States) Charleston
- May 15 – 22: 2022 IQFoil European Championships in (Italy) Nago-Torbole
- May 15 – 20: 2022 2.4mR European Championship in (France) Quiberon
- May 16 – 21: 2022 Lightning World Championship in (United States) Charleston
  - Final standings: (gold) (United States) Team PatStrong, (silver) (Chile) Ojo de Lince, (bronze) Argentina
- May 21 – 28: 2022 ILCA 7 Men's World Championship in (Mexico) Nuevo Vallarta
  - Final standings: (gold) (France) Jean-Baptiste Bernaz, (silver) (Cyprus) Pavlos Kontides, (bronze) (Croatia) Filip Jurišić
- May 23 – 29: 2022 Raceboard World Championships in (Hungary) Balatonföldvár
- May 30 – June 7: 2022 ILCA 7 Masters World Championship in (Mexico) Nuevo Vallarta
- June 9 – 12: 2022 Eurosaf Youth Match Race European Championship in (Italy) Ledro
- June 10 – 18: 2022 6m World Championship in (Spain) Sanxenxo
- June 12 – 17: 2022 Dragon World Championship in (Germany) Kühlungsborn
- June 18 – 22: 2022 World Foil Championships
- June 18 – 25: 2022 ILCA 4 Youth European Championships in (Poland) Dziwnów
- June 22 – 26: 2022 Match Racing Open European Championship in (Italy) Ravenna
- June 30 – July 8: 2022 29er European Championship in (Denmark) Copenhagen

=== 2022 World Match World Championship ===
- April 19 – 23: 2022 Congressional Cup (WC #1) in (United States) Long Beach

=== 2022 World Match Racing Tour ===
- April 13 – 16: 2022 Ficker Cup (WMRT #1) in (United States) Long Beach
- April 28 – May 1: Szczecin Match Race (WMRT #2) in (Poland) Szczecin
- May 6 – 8: Porto Montenegro Match Race (WMRT #3) in Tivat
- May 20 – 22: NJK Open Spring Cup 2022 (WMRT #4) in Finland
- May 24 – 29: Island Match Cup (WMRT #5) in Puerto Rico
- June 2 – 6: Match Race (WMRT #6) in Germany
- June 4 & 5: GKSS Spring Cup (WMRT #7) in Sweden
- June 16 – 19: OM International Ledro Match Race 2022 in (Italy) Ledro

=== 2022 Sail Grand Prix ===
- May 14 & 15: SailGP #1 in (Bermuda) Hamilton
- June 18 & 19: SailGP #2 in (United States) Chicago

=== 2022 iQFOiL International Games ===
- January 24 – 29: iQFOiL International Games #1 in (Spain) Lanzarote
  - Winners: (France) Nicolas Goyard (m) / (Spain) Pilar Lamadrid (f)
- March 8 – 13: iQFOiL International Games #2 in (Spain) Cádiz
- March 22 – 27: iQFOiL International Games #3 in (Spain) Palma de Mallorca
- May 3 – 8: iQFOiL International Games #4 in (Italy) Tremosine sul Garda
- July 23 – 30: iQFOiL International Games #5 in Germany
- September 5 – 11: iQFOiL International Games #5 in Croatia (final)

== Shooting sports ==
- August 1 – 9: 2021 World Running Target Championships in (France) Châteauroux
- September 27 – October 10: 2022 World Shotgun Championships in (Croatia) Osijek
- October 12 – 27: ISSF World Shooting Championships in (Egypt) Cairo

=== 2022 ISSF World Cup ===
- February 28 – March 6: WC #1 in (Egypt) Cairo
  - 10m Air Pistol winners: (India) Chaudhary Saurabh (m) / (Greece) Anna Korakaki (f)
  - 25m Rapid Fire Pistol winners: (France) Jean Quiquampoix (m) / (France) Mathilde Lamolle (f)
  - 10m Air Rifle winners: (Italy) Danilo Sollazzo (m) / (France) Océanne Muller (f)
  - 50m Rifle 3 Positions winners: (Slovakia) Patrik Jány (m) / (Norway) Jeanette Hegg Duestad (f)
  - 10m Air Pistol Mixed Team winners: Serbia (Zorana Arunović, Damir Mikec)
  - 25m Rapid Fire Pistol Mixed Team winners: India (Rhythm Sangwan, Anish Anish)
  - 10m Air Rifle Mixed Team winners: Norway (Jeanette Hegg Duestad, Jon-Hermann Hegg)
  - 50m Rifle 3 Positions Mixed Team winners: Norway (Jenny Stene, Jon-Hermann Hegg)
  - 10m Air Pistol Team winners: Germany (Michael Schwald, Robin Walter, Philipp Grimm) (m) / India (Esha Singh, Ruchita Vinerkar, Shri Nivetha Paramanantham) (f)
  - 25m Rapid Fire Pistol Team winners: Germany (Christian Reitz, Oliver Geis, Florian Peter) (m) / India (Rahi Sarnobat, Rhythm Sangwan, Esha Singh) (f)
  - 10m Air Rifle Team winners: Croatia (Miran Maričić, Petar Gorša, Borna Petanjek) (m) / Hungary (Eszter Mészáros, Eszter Dénes, Gitta Bajos) (f)
  - 50m Rifle 3 Positions Team winners: Austria (Thomas Mathis, Gernot Rumpler, Andreas Thum) (m) / Slovenia (Urška Kuharič, Živa Dvoršak, Klavdija Jerovšek) (f)
- March 8 – 19: WC #2 in (Cyprus) Nicosia
  - Trap winners: (Turkey) Oğuzhan Tüzün (m) / (Slovakia) Zuzana Rehák-Štefečeková (f)
  - Skeet winners: (Egypt) Azmy Mehelba (m) / (United Kingdom) Amber Hill (f)
  - Trap Team winners: Kuwait (Naser Al-Meqlad, Talal Al-Rashidi, Abdulrahman Al-Faihan) (m) / Australia (Penny Smith, Laetisha Scanlan, Catherine Skinner) (f)
  - Skeet Team winners: Italy (Tammaro Cassandro, Elia Sdruccioli, Gabriele Rossetti) (m) / Italy (Chiara Cainero, Martina Bartolomei, Diana Bacosi) (f)
  - Trap Mixed Team winners: Turkey (Murat İlbilgi, Rümeysa Pelin Kaya)
  - Skeet Mixed Team winners: Italy (Tammaro Cassandro, Diana Bacosi)
- March 27 – April 7: WC #3 in (Peru) Lima
  - Trap winners: (Spain) Alberto Fernández (m) / (Italy) Gaia Ragazzini (f)
  - Skeet winners: (Peru) Nicolás Pacheco (m) / (United States) Dania Jo Vizzi (f)
  - Trap Team winners: United States (William Hinton, Derrick Mein, Casey Wallace) (m) / United States (Kayle Browning, Aeriel Skinner, Rachel Tozier) (f)
  - Skeet Team winners: Italy (Cristian Ciccotti, Domenico Simeone, Marco Sablone) (m) / United States (Caitlin Connor, Austen Smith, Dania Jo Vizzi) (f)
  - Trap Mixed Team winners: Spain (Alberto Fernández, Fátima Gálvez)
  - Skeet Mixed Team winners: Italy (Domenico Simeone, Simona Scocchetti)
- April 9 – 19: WC #4 in (Brazil) Rio de Janeiro
  - 10m Air Rifle winners: (Croatia) Petar Gorša (m) / (Germany) Anna Janssen (f)
  - 10m Air Pistol winners: (Slovakia) Juraj Tužinský (m) / (Serbia) Zorana Arunović (f)
  - 10m Air Rifle Mixed Team winners: Czech Republic (Lucie Brázdová, Jiří Přívratský)
  - 10m Air Pistol Mixed Team winners: Germany (Sandra Reitz, Christian Reitz)
  - 10m Air Rifle Team winners: United States (Lucas Kozeniesky, Rylan Kissell, William Shaner) (m) / Germany (Anna Janssen, Lisa Müller, Anita Magold) (f)
  - 10m Air Pistol Team winners: Germany (Paul Fröhlich, Robin Walter, David Probst) (m) / Iran (Golnoush Sebghatollahi, Hanieh Rostamian, Elham Harijani) (f)
  - 50m Rifle 3 Positions winners: (Czech Republic) Jiří Přívratský (m) / (Norway) Jeanette Hegg Duestad (f)
  - 25m Rapid Fire Pistol winners: (Germany) Christian Reitz (m) / (France) Camille Jedrzejewski (f)
  - 25m Rapid Fire Pistol Team winners: Germany (Christian Reitz, Oliver Geis, Florian Peter) (m) / Germany (Doreen Vennekamp, Sandra Reitz, Monika Karsch) (f)
  - 50m Rifle 3 Positions Team winners: Czech Republic (Jiří Přívratský, František Smetana, Petr Nymburský) (m) / Norway (Jeanette Hegg Duestad, Kathrine Lund, Jenny Stene) (f)
  - 50m Rifle 3 Positions Mixed Team winners: Czech Republic (Lucie Brázdová, Jiří Přívratský)

=== 2022 ISSF Grand Prix 10m Rifle/Pistol ===
- January 12 – 16: Grand Prix #1 in (Slovenia) Ruše
  - 10m Air Pistol winners: (Azerbaijan) Ruslan Lunev (m) / (Russia) Vitalina Batsarashkina (f)
  - 10m Air Rifle winners: (Croatia) Miran Maričić (m) / (Serbia) Andrea Arsović (f)
  - 10m Air Pistol Mixed Team winners: Greece (Anna Korakaki, Dionysios Korakakis)
  - 10m Air Rifle Mixed Team winners: Hungary I (István Péni, Eszter Mészáros)
  - Air Pistol Team winners: Russia (Artem Chernousov, Vadim Mukhametyanov, Anton Aristarkhov) (m) / Russia (Vitalina Batsarashkina, Daria Sirotkina, Anna Asomchik) (f)
  - Air Rifle Team winners: Russia (Vladimir Maslennikov, Evgenii Potapov, Alexander Dryagin) (m) / Poland (Aneta Stankiewicz, Natalia Kochańska, Julia Piotrowska) (f)
- January 18 – 22: Grand Prix #2 in Osijek
  - 10m Air Pistol winners: (Russia) Artem Chernousov (m) / (Hungary) Veronika Major (f)
  - 10m Air Rifle winners: (Ukraine) Serhiy Kulish (m) / (Serbia) Andrea Arsović (f)
  - Air Pistol Team winners: Serbia (Damir Mikec, Dusko Petrov, Dimitrije Grgić) (m) / Italy (Sara Costantino, Brunella Aria, Chiara Giancamilli) (f)
  - Air Rifle Team winners: Croatia (Petar Gorša, Miran Maričić, Borna Petanjek) (m) / Russia (Yulia Kruglova, Yulia Karimova, Aigul Khabibullina) (f)
  - 10m Air Pistol Mixed Team winners: Russia (Vitalina Batsarashkina, Artem Chernousov)
  - 10m Air Rifle Mixed Team winners: France I (Océanne Muller, Brian Baudouin)
- February 8 – 18: Grand Prix #3 in Jakarta
  - 10m Air Rifle winners: (Thailand) Napis Tortungpanich (m) / (Romania) Laura Ilie (f)
  - 10m Air Pistol winners: (Indonesia) Muhamad Iqbal Raia Prabowa (m) / (Malaysia) Nurul Syasya Nadiah Mohd Ariffin (f)
  - Air Pistol Team winners: Indonesia (Muhamad Iqbal Raia Prabowa, Wira Sukmana, Deny Pratama) (m) / Singapore (Teo Shun Xie, Xiu Hong Teh, Mak Amanda Sao Keng) (f)
  - Air Rifle Team winners: Singapore (Gai Tianrui, Zen Joi Lionel Wong, Marat Veloso) (m) / Singapore (Natanya Tan, Adele Tan, Fernel Tan) (f)
  - 10m Air Pistol Mixed Team winners: Thailand 2 (Natsara Champalat & Tatsura Banphaveerachon)
  - 10m Air Rifle Mixed Team winners: Indonesia I (Monica Daryanti & Fathur Gustafian)

== Skyrunning ==
- February 4 & 5: 2022 Skysnow World Championships in (Spain) Sierra Nevada
- September 9 – 11: 2022 Skyrunning World Championships in (Italy) Ossola

== Sled dog racing ==
- February 23 – 27: 2022 IFSS On-Snow World Championships in (Sweden) Åsarna
- February 28 – March 4: 2022 IFSS/WSA Long Distance World Championship in (Sweden) Särna
- March 10 – 12: 2022 Sleddog World Championship in (Sweden) Östersund

== Softball ==
- November 26 – December 4: 2022 Men's Softball World Cup in New Zealand

=== 2022 Little League Baseball World Series ===
- Men
- Women

=== 2022 Junior League Baseball World Series ===
- Women

=== 2022 Senior League Baseball World Series ===
- Men
- Women

== Speed skating ==
=== 2022 Winter Olympics ===
- February 5–19: Speed skating at the 2022 Winter Olympics in (China) Beijing
  - Women's 3000 m winners: (gold) : (Netherlands) Irene Schouten, (silver) : (Italy) Francesca Lollobrigida, (bronze) : (Canada) Isabelle Weidemann
- February 5–16: Short track speed skating at the 2022 Winter Olympics in (China) Beijing

=== Major competitions ===
- December 15–17, 2021: 2021 Four Continents Speed Skating Championships in Calgary
  - 500 m winners: (United States) Austin Kleba (m) / (Kazakhstan) Yekaterina Aydova (f)
  - 1000 m winners: (Kazakhstan) Denis Kuzin (m) / (Chinese Taipei) Huang Yu-ting (f)
  - 1500 m winners: (Kazakhstan) Dmitry Morozov (m) / (Canada) Kali Christ (f)
  - Mass Start winners: (South Korea) Um Cheon-Ho (m) / (South Korea) Park Chae-won (f)
  - Men's 5000 m winner: (Canada) Ted-Jan Bloemen
  - Women's 3000 m winner: (United States) Jamie Jurak
  - Team Pursuit winners: Canada (Ted-Jan Bloemen, Hayden Mayeur, Kaleb Müller, Jess Neufeld) (m) / United States (Giorgia Birkeland, Jamie Jurak, Sarah Warren, Dessie Weigel) (f)
  - Team Sprint winners: United States (Austin Kleba, Brett Perry, Zach Stoppelmoor, Tanner Worley) (m) / United States (Giorgia Birkeland, McKenzie Browne, Chrysta Rands, Sarah Warren) (f)
- January 7–9: 2022 European Speed Skating Championships in Heerenveen
  - 500 m winners: (Poland) Piotr Michalski (m) / (Netherlands) Femke Kok (f)
  - 1000 m winners: (Netherlands) Thomas Krol (m) / (Netherlands) Jutta Leerdam (f)
  - 1500 m winners: (Netherlands) Kjeld Nuis (m) / (Netherlands) Antoinette de Jong (f)
  - Men's 5000 m winner: (Netherlands) Patrick Roest
  - Women's 3000 m winner: (Netherlands) Irene Schouten
  - Mass Start winners: (Belgium) Bart Swings (m) / (Netherlands) Irene Schouten (f)
  - Team Pursuit winners: Netherlands (Sven Kramer, Marcel Bosker, Patrick Roest) (m) / Netherlands (Ireen Wüst, Antoinette de Jong, Irene Schouten, Marijke Groenewoud (reserve)) (f)
  - Team Sprint winners: Netherlands (Merijn Scheperkamp, Kai Verbij, Tijmen Snel, Thomas Krol (reserve)) (m) / Poland (Andżelika Wójcik, Kaja Ziomek, Karolina Bosiek, Olga Kaczmarek (reserve))
- January 14–16: 2022 European Short Track Speed Skating Championships in (Germany) Dresden
  - Competition cancelled.
- January 14–16: 2022 Four Continents Short Track Speed Skating Championships (United States) Salt Lake City
  - Competition cancelled.
- January 28–30: 2022 World Junior Speed Skating Championships in (Austria) Innsbruck
  - 500 m winners: (Netherlands) Joep Wennemars (m) / (Netherlands) Pien Smit (f)
  - 1000 m winners: (Netherlands) Joep Wennemars (m) / (Japan) Yukino Yoshida (f)
  - 1500 m winners: (Netherlands) Tim Prins (m) / (Netherlands) Jade Groenewoud (f)
  - Mass Start winners: (South Korea) Yang Ho-jun (m) / (Netherlands) Chloé Hoogendoorn (f)
  - Men's 5000 m winner: (Norway) Sigurd Henriksen
  - Women's 3000 m winner: (Netherlands) Jade Groenewoud
  - Team Pursuit winners: Japan (Kotaro Kasahara, Issei Matsumoto, Shomu Sasaki) (m) / Netherlands (Jade Groenewoud, Chloé Hoogendoorn, Evelien Vijn) (f)
  - Team Sprint winners: Russia (Sergei Bukuev, Nikita Proshin, Vsevolod Yatov) (m) / Netherlands (Jildou Hoekstra, Chloé Hoogendoorn, Pien Smit) (f)
- Overall winners: (Netherlands) Joep Wennemars (m) / (Netherlands) Jade Groenewoud (f)
- March 3–6: 2022 World Sprint Speed Skating Championships and 2022 World Allround Speed Skating Championships in (Norway) Hamar
- March 4–6: 2022 World Junior Short Track Speed Skating Championships in (Poland) Gdańsk
- March 18–20: 2022 World Short Track Speed Skating Championships in (Canada) Montreal

=== 2021–22 ISU Speed Skating World Cup ===
- November 12–14, 2021: WC #1 in (Poland) Tomaszów Mazowiecki
  - 1st 500 m winners: (China) Gao Tingyu (m) / (United States) Erin Jackson (f)
  - 2st 500 m winners: (Japan) Tatsuya Shinhama (m) / (United States) Erin Jackson (f)
  - 1000 m winners: (Netherlands) Hein Otterspeer (m) / (United States) Brittany Bowe (f)
  - 1500 m winners: (South Korea) Kim Min-seok (m) / (Japan) Miho Takagi (f)
  - Mass Start winners: (Japan) Masahito Obayashi (m) / (Netherlands) Irene Schouten (f)
  - Men's 5000 m winner: (Sweden) Nils van der Poel
  - Women's 3000 m winner: (Netherlands) Irene Schouten
  - Team Pursuit winners: Netherlands (Sven Kramer, Patrick Roest, Marcel Bosker) (m) / Canada (Ivanie Blondin, Isabelle Weidemann, Valérie Maltais) (f)
- November 19–21, 2021: WC #2 in (Norway) Stavanger
  - 1st 500 m winners: (Canada) Laurent Dubreuil (m) / (United States) Erin Jackson (f)
  - 2st 500 m winners: (Japan) Tatsuya Shinhama (m) / (Japan) Nao Kodaira (f)
  - 1000 m winners: (Netherlands) Thomas Krol (m) / (United States) Brittany Bowe (f)
  - 1500 m winners: (China) Ning Zhongyan (m) / (Japan) Miho Takagi (f)
  - Men's 10000 m winner: (Sweden) Nils van der Poel
  - Women's 5000 m winner: (Netherlands) Irene Schouten
  - Team Sprint winners: China (Haotian Wang, Lian Ziwen, Ning Zhongyan, Haonan Du) (m) / Poland (Andżelika Wójcik, Kaja Ziomek, Natalia Czerwonka, Karolina Bosiek) (f)
- December 3–5, 2021: WC #3 in Salt Lake City
  - 1st 500 m winners: (Japan) Yamato Matsui (m) / (United States) Erin Jackson (f)
  - 2st 500 m winners: (Japan) Wataru Morishige (m) / (Poland) Andżelika Wójcik (f)
  - 1000 m winners: (Netherlands) Thomas Krol (m) / (Japan) Miho Takagi (f)
  - 1500 m winners: (United States) Joey Mantia (m) / (Japan) Miho Takagi (f)
  - Mass Start winners: (Belgium) Bart Swings (m) / (Canada) Ivanie Blondin (f)
  - Men's 5000 m winner: (Sweden) Nils van der Poel
  - Women's 3000 m winner: (Netherlands) Irene Schouten
  - Team Pursuit winners: United States (Joey Mantia, Emery Lehman, Casey Dawson) (m) / Canada (Valérie Maltais, Ivanie Blondin, Isabelle Weidemann, Alexa Scott) (f)
- December 10–12, 2021: WC #4 in Calgary
  - 1st 500 m winners: (Canada) Laurent Dubreuil (m) / (Russia) Olga Fatkulina (f)
  - 2st 500 m winners: (Russia) Viktor Mushtakov (m) / (Russia) Angelina Golikova (f)
  - 1000 m winners: (China) Ning Zhongyan (m) / (Japan) Nao Kodaira (f)
  - 1500 m winners: (United States) Joey Mantia (m) / (United States) Brittany Bowe (f)
  - Mass Start winners: (Netherlands) Albertus Hoolwerf (m) / (Italy) Francesca Lollobrigida (f)
  - Men's 5000 m winner: (Sweden) Nils van der Poel
  - Women's 3000 m winner: (Italy) Francesca Lollobrigida
  - Team Pursuit winners: United States (Ethan Cepuran, Casey Dawson, Emery Lehman, Joey Mantia) (m) / Canada (Valérie Maltais, Ivanie Blondin, Isabelle Weidemann, Alexa Scott) (f)
- March 12–13: WC #5 in (Netherlands) Heerenveen (final)
  - 1st 500 m winners: (Japan) Tatsuya Shinhama (m) / (United States) Erin Jackson (f)
  - 2st 500 m winners: (Japan) Tatsuya Shinhama (m) / (United States) Erin Jackson (f)
  - 1000 m winners: (Netherlands) Kjeld Nuis (m) / (Japan) Miho Takagi (f)
  - 1500 m winners: (Netherlands) Kjeld Nuis (m) / (Japan) Miho Takagi (f)
  - Mass Start winners: (Belgium) Bart Swings (m) / (Netherlands) Irene Schouten (f)
  - Men's 5000 m winner: (Sweden) Nils van der Poel
  - Women's 3000 m winner: (Netherlands) Irene Schouten

=== 2021–22 ISU Short Track Speed Skating World Cup ===
- October 21–24, 2021: WC #1 in Beijing
  - 500 m winners: (Hungary) Shaolin Sándor Liu (m) / (Poland) Natalia Maliszewska (f)
  - 1000 m winners: (South Korea) Hwang Dae-heon (m) / (Netherlands) Suzanne Schulting (f)
  - 1500 m winners: (Russia) Semion Elistratov (m) / (South Korea) Lee Yu-bin (f)
  - Men's 5000 m Relay winners: Netherlands (Itzhak de Laat, Sjinkie Knegt, Sven Roes, Jens van 't Wout)
  - Women's 3000 m Relay winners: China (Fan Kexin, Guo Yihan, Qu Chunyu, Zhang Yuting)
  - Mixed 2000 m Relay winners: China (Fan Kexin, Ren Ziwei, Wu Dajing, Zhang Yuting)
- October 28–31, 2021: WC #2 in (Japan) Nagoya
  - 500 m winners: (South Korea) Hwang Dae-heon (m) / (Italy) Arianna Fontana (f)
  - 1000 m winners: (China) Ren Ziwei (m) / (United States) Kristen Santos (f)
  - 1500 m winners: (Italy) Yuri Confortola (m) / (Netherlands) Suzanne Schulting (f)
  - Men's 5000 m Relay winners: Canada (Pascal Dion, Steven Dubois, Charles Hamelin, Jordan Pierre-Gilles)
  - Women's 3000 m Relay winners: Netherlands (Selma Poutsma, Suzanne Schulting, Yara van Kerkhof, Xandra Velzeboer, Rianne de Vries)
  - Mixed 2000 m Relay winners: Russia (Ekaterina Efremenkova, Semion Elistratov, Sofia Prosvirnova, Pavel Sitnikov)
- November 18–21, 2021: WC #3 in (Hungary) Debrecen
  - 500 m winners: (Hungary) Shaolin Sándor Liu (m) / (Netherlands) Suzanne Schulting (f)
  - 1000 m winners: (South Korea) Hwang Dae-heon (m) / (Netherlands) Suzanne Schulting (f)
  - 1500 m winners: (China) Ren Ziwei (m) / (Netherlands) Suzanne Schulting (f)
  - Men's 5000 m Relay winners: Canada (Charles Hamelin, Maxime Laoun, Steven Dubois, Jordan Pierre-Gilles, Pascal Dion)
  - Women's 3000 m Relay winners: Netherlands (Selma Poutsma, Suzanne Schulting, Yara van Kerkhof, Xandra Velzeboer, Rianne de Vries)
  - Mixed 2000 m Relay winners: China (Qu Chunyu, Fan Kexin, Zhang Yuting, Wu Dajing, Ren Ziwei, Sun Long, Yu Songnan)
- November 25–28, 2021: WC #4 in Dordrecht (final)
  - 500 m winners: (China) Wu Dajing (m) / (Canada) Kim Boutin (f)
  - 1000 m winners: (Hungary) Shaoang Liu (m) / (South Korea) Choi Min-jeong (f)
  - 1500 m winners: (China) Ren Ziwei (m) / (South Korea) Lee Yu-bin (f)
  - Men's 5000 m Relay winners: South Korea (Kim Dong-wook, Kwak Yoon-Gy, Park In-wook, Park Jang-hyuk)
  - Women's 3000 m Relay winners: Netherlands (Selma Poutsma, Suzanne Schulting, Yara van Kerkhof, Xandra Velzeboer, Rianne de Vries)
  - Mixed 2000 m Relay winners: Netherlands (Sjinkie Knegt, Selma Poutsma, Suzanne Schulting, Jens Van 't Wout)

== Speed skiing ==
- January 28 – 30: 2022 FIS Speed Skiing World Championships in (France) Vars
  - Men's winners: (France) Simon Billy
  - Women's winner: (Italy) Valentina Greggio

=== 2022 Speed Skiing World Cup ===
- February 11 & 12: WC #1 in (Finland) Salla
  - Men's winner: (Italy) Simone Origone (2 times)
  - Women's winner: (Italy) Valentina Greggio (2 times)
- March 10 – 12: WC #2 in (Sweden) Idrefjäll
  - Men's winners: (France) Simon Billy (1st and 2nd) / (France) Bastien Montès (3rd)
  - Women's winner: (Italy) Valentina Greggio (3 times)
- March 31 – April 2: WC #3 in (Andorra) Grandvalira/Grau Roig
  - Men's winner: (Italy) Simone Origone (2 times)
  - Women's winner: (Italy) Valentina Greggio (2 times)
- World Cup winners: (Italy) Simone Origone (m) / (Italy) Valentina Greggio (f)

== Sport climbing ==
=== 2022 IFSC Climbing World Cup ===
- April 8 – 10: WC #1 in (Switzerland) Meiringen
  - Boulder winners: (Japan) Tomoa Narasaki (m) / (Slovenia) Janja Garnbret (f)
- May 6 – 8: WC #2 in (South Korea) Seoul
  - Boulder winners: (Japan) Kokoro Fujii (m) / (United States) Natalia Grossman (f)
  - Speed winners: (Indonesia) Veddriq Leonardo (m) / (Poland) Aleksandra Mirosław (f)
- May 20 – 22: WC #3 in (United States) Salt Lake City
  - Boulder winners: (France) Mejdi Schalck (m) / (United States) Natalia Grossman (f)
  - Speed winners: (Indonesia) Kiromal Katibin (m) / (Poland) Aleksandra Mirosław (f)
- May 27 – 29: WC #4 in (United States) Salt Lake City
  - Boulder winners: (Japan) Yoshiyuki Ogata (m) / (United States) Natalia Grossman (f)
  - Speed winners: (Indonesia) Veddriq Leonardo (m) / (Poland) Aleksandra Mirosław (f)
- June 10–12: WC #5 in (Italy) Brixen
  - Boulder winners: (Germany) Yannick Flohé (m) / (United States) Natalia Grossman (f)
- June 22 – 25: WC #6 in (Austria) Innsbruck
  - Boulder winners: (United States) Colin Duffy (m) / (United States) Natalia Grossman (f)
  - Lead winners: (United States) Colin Duffy (m) / (Slovenia) Janja Garnbret (f)
- June 30 – July 2: WC #7 in (Switzerland) Villars
  - Lead winners: (Japan) Taisei Homma (m) / (Slovenia) Janja Garnbret (f)
  - Speed winners: (China) Long Jianguo (m) / (China) Deng Lijuan (f)
- July 8–10: WC #8 in (France) Chamonix
  - Lead winners: (Czech Republic) Adam Ondra (m) / (Slovenia) Janja Garnbret (f)
  - Speed winners: (China) Long Jinbao (m) / (China) Deng Lijuan (f)
- July 22–23: WC #9 in (France) Briançon
  - Lead winners: (United States) Jesse Grupper (m) / (Slovenia) Janja Garnbret (f)
- September 2–3: WC #10 in (Slovenia) Koper
  - Lead winners: (Slovenia) Luka Potočar (m) / (Japan) Ai Mori (f)
- September 9–11: WC #11 in (United Kingdom) Edinburgh
  - Lead winners: (United States) Jesse Grupper (m) / (Japan) Ai Mori (f)
  - Speed winners: (United States) Samuel Watson (m) / (Poland) Aleksandra Kałucka (f)
- September 24–26: WC #12 in (Indonesia) Jakarta
  - Lead winners: (Japan) Ao Yurikusa (m) / (Slovenia) Janja Garnbret (f)
  - Speed winners: (Indonesia) Aspar Aspar (m) / (China) Deng Lijuan (f)
- October 20–22: WC #13 in (Japan) Morioka
  - Combined (boulder & lead) winners: (Japan) Tomoa Narasaki (m) / (Japan) Ai Mori (f)

== Sport fishing ==
=== Fly fishing ===
- September 25 – October 2: 2022 Fly Fishing World Championship in (Spain) Asturias

=== Fresh water ===
- February 19 & 20: 2022 Ice Fishing World Championship in Šiauliai
  - Individual: (gold) (Belarus) Aliaksei Yudzenkou, (silver) (Ukraine) Pavlo Khvas, (bronze) (Lithuania) Deividas Račkauskas.
  - Teams: (gold) Lithuania, (silver) Belarus, (bronze) Ukraine.
- April 30 & May 1: 2022 Carnivorous Artificial Baits Shore Fishing World Championship in Campobasso
  - Individual: (gold) (Italy) Bruno Mariano Spino, (silver) (Italy) Luca Benedetti, (bronze) (Italy) Valentino Vidrasc.
  - Teams: (gold) Italy, (silver) Slovakia, (bronze) Poland.
- May 28 & 29: 2022 Trout Fishing with Natural Baits World Championship in (France) Pont-de-Chéruy
- July 9 & 10: 2022 Feeder Fishing World Championship for Nations in (Ukraine) Kyiv
- August 20 & 21: 2022 Coarse Angling World Championship for Ladies in (France) Coudekerque-Branche
- August 31 – September 3: 2022 Carp Fishing World Championship for Ladies in (England) Oxford
- September 10 & 11: 2022 Coarse Angling World Championship for Nations in (Croatia) Osijek
- September 21 – 24: 2022 Carp Fishing World Championship in (Ukraine) Prylbychi
- September 24 & 25: 2022 Carnivorous Artificial Baits Kayaks Fishing World Championship in (Portugal) Torre de Moncorvo
- October 6 – 8: 2022 Carnivorous Artificial Baits Boats Fishing World Championship in (Poland) Orzysz
- October 20 – 22: 2022 Black-Bass Fishing World Championship in (United States) Columbia
- November 5 & 6: 2022 Trout Area Fishing World Championship
- November 19 & 20: 2022 Street Fishing World Championship in (Belgium) Ghent
- December 3 & 4: 2022 Feeder Free Style Method Fishing World Championship in (South Africa) Bloemhof Dam

=== Sea ===
- May 28 – June 4: 2022 Shore Angling Pair Angling World Championship in Mimizan
  - Individual: (gold) (France) Frédéric Joubert & Jonathan Selleslagh, (silver) (Scotland) William Buckley & Michael McLoughlin, (bronze) (Germany) Fabian Frenzel & Sebastian Lucklum.
  - Teams: (gold) France, (silver) Spain, (bronze) Belgium.
- September 10 – 17: 2022 Big Game Fishing World Championship in (Italy) Pescara
- September 24 – October 1: 2022 Boat Angling World Championship in (Portugal) Albufeira
- November 19 – 26: 2022 Shore Angling World Championship in (Tunisia) Hammamet
- TBC: 2022 Long Casting of Sea Weights World Championship in Paraguay

== Squash ==
- May 13 – 22: 2022 PSA Men's World Squash Championship in (Egypt) Cairo
  - (Egypt) Ali Farag def. (Egypt) Mohamed El Shorbagy, 9–11, 11–8, 7–11, 11–9, 11–2.
- May 13 – 22: 2022 PSA Women's World Squash Championship in (Egypt) Cairo
  - (Egypt) Nour El Sherbini def. (Egypt) Nouran Gohar, 7–11, 11–7, 11–8, 11–7.

=== 2021–22 PSA World Tour ===
Gold

- September 23 – 27, 2021: Oracle Netsuite Open in (United States) San Francisco
  - Men's: (Egypt) Ali Farag def. (New Zealand) Paul Coll, 9–11, 12–10, 11–8, 11–8.
  - Women's: (United States) Amanda Sobhy def. (Egypt) Salma Hany, 11–7, 11–8, 11–4.
- November 14 – 19, 2021: Canary Wharf Classic in (England) London
  - Men's: (New Zealand) Paul Coll def. (Egypt) Ali Farag, 7–11, 13–11, 11–5, 11–6.
- December 12 – 20, 2021: CIB Black Ball Squash Open in (Egypt) Cairo
  - Women's: (Egypt) Nour El Sherbini def. (Egypt) Hania El Hammamy, 11–7, 9–11, 11–1, 11–7.
- December 16 – 20, 2021: CIB Black Ball Squash Open in (Egypt) Cairo
  - Men's: (New Zealand) Paul Coll def. (Egypt) Ali Farag, 11–7, 11–5, 13–11.
- January 4 – 9: Houston Open in (United States) Houston
  - Men's: (Egypt) Ali Farag def. (Egypt) Mazen Hesham, 11–6, 8–11, 11–7, 11–3.
- March 6 – 11: OptAsia Championships in (United Kingdom) London
  - Men's: (Egypt) Ali Farag def. (Peru) Diego Elías, 4–11, 11–8, 11–8, 13–11.
- March 13 – 18: GillenMarkets Canary Wharf Classic in (United Kingdom) London
  - Men's: (Egypt) Fares Dessouky def. (Egypt) Mostafa Asal, 11–5, 13–11, 12–10.
- May 1 – 7: J.P. Morgan Tournament of Champions in (United States) New York City
  - Men's: (Egypt) Ali Farag def. (Peru) Diego Elías, 16–14, 9–11, 11–9, 11–5.
  - Women's: (Egypt) Nouran Gohar def. (United States) Amanda Sobhy, 11–7, 11–7, 11–3.
- June 7 – 11: Necker Mauritius Open in Forbach
  - Men's: (Peru) Diego Elías def. (England) Mohamed El Shorbagy, 11–2, 11–9, 11–8.

Silver

- August 9 – 13, 2021: Manchester Open in (England) Manchester
  - Men's: (Peru) Diego Elías def. (Wales) Joel Makin, 12–10, 11–6, 11–6.
  - Women's: (Egypt) Hania El Hammamy def. (England) Sarah-Jane Perry, 11–5, 11–9, 11–7.
- January 26 – 30: Sturbridge Capital Motor City Open in (United States) Bloomfield Hills
  - Men's: (Peru) Diego Elías def. (Egypt) Fares Dessouky, 11–5, 11–8, 11–9.
- April 13 – 18: Manchester Open in (England) Manchester
  - Men's: (Wales) Joel Makin def. (Egypt) Mohamed El Shorbagy, 11–7, 5–11, 13–11, 11–4.
  - Women's: (New Zealand) Joelle King def. (England) Sarah-Jane Perry, 11–8, 11–9, 11–8.

Bronze

- October 19 – 23, 2021: DAC Pro Squash Classic in (United States) Detroit
  - Women's: (Egypt) Nouran Gohar def. (England) Georgina Kennedy, 11–8, 11–6, 11–1.
- November 23 – 27, 2021: Malaysian Open in (Malaysia) Kuala Lumpur
  - Men's: (India) Saurav Ghosal def. (Colombia) Miguel Ángel Rodríguez, 11–7, 11–8, 13–11.
  - Women's: (Malaysia) Aifa Azman def. (Egypt) Salma Hany, 12–10, 11–8, 11–4.
- January 27 – 31: Cleveland Classic in (United States) Pepper Pike
  - Women's: (England) Georgina Kennedy def. (England) Sarah-Jane Perry, 11–7, 6–11, 11–2, 11–6.
- February 2 – 6: Gaynor Cincinnati Cup in (United States) Detroit
  - Women's: (Egypt) Nouran Gohar def. (United States) Olivia Fiechter, 11–6, 11–3, 11–8.
- February 16 – 20: Squash on Fire Open in (United States) Washington, D.C.
  - Men's: (Egypt) Mohamed El Shorbagy def. (Wales) Joel Makin, 11–5, 11–9, 11–18.
  - Women's: (Egypt) Nour El Sherbini def. (New Zealand) Joelle King, 6–11, 11–8, 16–14, 13–11.
- March 15 – 19: Karachi Open Squash Championships in (Pakistan) Karachi
  - Men's: (Egypt) Karim Abdel Gawad def. (Egypt) Youssef Soliman, 11–5, 11–9, 11–6.
- April 20 – 24: Carol Weymuller Open in (United States) New York City
  - Women's: (Egypt) Rowan Elaraby def. (Malaysia) Sivasangari Subramaniam, 11–7, 6–11, 11–9, 11–6.

Platinum

- August 16 – 22, 2021: Allam British Open in (England) Hull
  - Men's: (New Zealand) Paul Coll def. (Egypt) Ali Farag, 6–11, 11–6, 11–6, 11–8.
  - Women's: (Egypt) Nour El Sherbini def. (Egypt) Nouran Gohar, 9–11, 13–11, 5–11, 11–7, 11–2.
- September 10 – 17, 2021: CIB Egyptian Open in (Egypt) Cairo
  - Men's: (Egypt) Ali Farag def. (Egypt) Mohamed El Shorbagy, 6–11, 9–11, 11–2, 11–6, 11–5.
  - Women's: (Egypt) Nouran Gohar def. (Egypt) Nour El Sherbini, 11–7, 11–4, 5–11, 7–11, 12–10.
- October 1 – 6, 2021: U.S. Open in (United States) Philadelphia
  - Men's: (Egypt) Mostafa Asal def. (Egypt) Tarek Momen, 5–11, 5–11, 11–9, 12–10, 11–3.
  - Women's: (Egypt) Nouran Gohar def. (Egypt) Hania El Hammamy, 9–11, 11–9, 11–7, 11–3.
- October 17 – 23, 2021: Qatar Classic in Doha
  - Men's: (Peru) Diego Elías def. (New Zealand) Paul Coll, 13–11, 5–11, 13–11, 11–9.
- February 23 – March 2: Windy City Open in (United States) Chicago
  - Men's: (New Zealand) Paul Coll def. (Egypt) Youssef Ibrahim, 7–11, 10–12, 11–4, 11–7, 11–9.
  - Women's: (Egypt) Nouran Gohar def. (Egypt) Hania El Hammamy, 15–13, 11–9, 11–8.
- March 12 – 17: CIB Black Ball Squash Open in (Egypt) Cairo
  - Women's: (Egypt) Nouran Gohar def. (Egypt) Nour El Sherbini, 17–15, 11–8, 2–0, rtd.
- March 28 – April 3: Allam British Open in (England) Hull
  - Men's: (New Zealand) Paul Coll def. (Egypt) Ali Farag, 12–10, 11–6, 11–4.
  - Women's: (Egypt) Hania El Hammamy def. (Egypt) Nouran Gohar, 11–9, 11–7, 8–11, 11–4.
- May 27 – June 3: El Gouna international in (Egypt) El Gouna
  - Men's: (Egypt) Mostafa Asal def. (New Zealand) Paul Coll, 11–8, 11–9, 11–5.
  - Women's: (Egypt) Hania El Hammamy def. (Egypt) Nouran Gohar, 11–2, 11–4, 8–11, 9–11, 11–4.

==== 2021–22 PSA World Tour Finals ====
  - Men's: (Egypt) Mostafa Asal def. (New Zealand) Paul Coll, 13–11, 11–8, 11–7.
  - Women's: (Egypt) Nour El Sherbini def. (Egypt) Nouran Gohar, 11–6, 11–8, 11–5.

== Surfing ==
=== 2022 World Surf League ===
- January 29 – February 10: Billabong Pipeline Masters in (Hawaii) Oahu
  - Winners: (United States) Kelly Slater (m) / (Hawaii) Moana Jones Wong (f)
- February 11 – 23: Hurley Pro Sunset Beach in (Hawaii) Oahu
  - Winners: (Hawaii) Barron Mamiya (m) / (Costa Rica) Brisa Hennessy (f)
- March 3 – 13: MEO Pro Portugal in Peniche
  - Winners: (United States) Griffin Colapinto (m) / (Brazil) Tatiana Weston-Webb (f)
- April 10 – 20: Rip Curl Pro Bells Beach in (Australia) Bells Beach
  - Winners: (Brazil) Filipe Toledo (m) / (Australia) Tyler Wright (f)
- April 24 – May 4: Margaret River Pro in (Australia) Margaret River
  - Winners: (Australia) Jack Robinson (m) / (Australia) Isabella Nichols (f)
- May 28 – June 6: Quiksilver Pro G-Land in (Indonesia) G-Land
  - Winners: (Australia) Jack Robinson (m) / (France) Johanne Defay (f)

=== 2022 World Surf Challenger Series ===
- May 7 – 15: Gold Coast in (Australia) Gold Coast

== Synchronized skating ==
- April 7 – 9: 2022 ISU World Synchronized Skating Championships in (Canada) Hamilton
  - Final placements: (gold) : (Canada) Les Suprêmes, (silver) : (Finland) Marigold IceUnity, (bronze) : (Finland) Rockettes

== Table tennis ==
- September 30 – October 9: 2022 World Table Tennis Team Championships in (China) Chengdu

=== 2022 WTT Feeder ===
- January 10 – 15: WTT Feeder Düsseldorf I in (Germany) Düsseldorf
  - Men's singles: (Austria) Robert Gardos def. (Puerto Rico) Brian Afanador, 4–1 (11–9, 11–8, 11–7, 5–11, 11–9).
  - Women's singles: (Slovakia) Barbora Balážová def. (Germany) Shan Xiaona, 4–3 (13–11, 11–5, 5–11, 8–11, 11–3, 11–13, 11–4).
  - Men's doubles: (France) Félix Lebrun & (France) Esteban Dorr def. (Portugal) Diogo Chen & (France) Florian Bourrassaud, 3–1 (11–8, 4–11, 11–9, 11–7).
  - Women's doubles: (Croatia) Hana Arapović & (Bulgaria) Polina Trifonova def. (Croatia) Ivana Malobabić & (Croatia) Mateja Jeger, 3–0 (walkover).
- January 17 – 23: WTT Feeder Düsseldorf II in (Germany) Düsseldorf
  - Men's singles: (Germany) Patrick Franziska def. (Romania) Ovidiu Ionescu, 4–0 (11–5, 11–6, 11–9, 11–8).
  - Women's singles: (Russia) Elizabet Abraamian def. (Austria) Amelie Solja, 4–3, (11–13, 7–11, 11–7, 8–11, 11–6, 11–5, 11–8).
  - Men's doubles: (France) Alexis Lebrun & (France) Félix Lebrun def. (Romania) Ovidiu Ionescu & (Spain) Álvaro Robles, 3–1 (11–7, 11–6, 10–12, 11–7).
  - Women's doubles: (Germany) Chantal Mantz & (Germany) Yuan Wan def. (Italy) Giorgia Piccolin & (Italy) Debora Vivarelli, 3–0 (11–7, 11–4, 11–9).
  - Mixed doubles: (Serbia) Dimitrije Levajac & (Serbia) Izabela Lupulesku def. (Italy) John Oyebode & (Italy) Gaia Monfardini, 3–2 (11–8, 8–11, 11–5, 6–11, 11–5).
- February 27 – March 5: WTT Feeder Muscat in (Oman) Muscat

=== 2022 WTT Youth Star Contender ===
- January 31 – February 6: Youth Star Contender #1 in (Tunisia) Tunis
  - U19 singles winners: (France) Alexis Lebrun (m) / (Romania) Elena Zaharia (f)
  - U15 singles winners: (Slovakia) Samuel Arpáš (m) / (Russia) Anastasiia Ivanova (f)
  - U19 doubles winners: (Belgium) Louis Laffineur & (Belgium) Adrien Rassenfosse (m) / (Russia) Vlada Voronina & (Russia) Lyubov Tenser (f)
  - U15 doubles winners: (Portugal) Tiago Abiodun & (France) Flavien Coton (m) / (Spain) María Berzosa & (Portugal) Mariana Santa Comba (f)
- February 14 – 20: Youth Star Contender #2 in (Belgium) Spa
- February 14 – 20: Youth Star Contender #3 in (France) Metz
- February 26 – March 4: Youth Star Contender #4 in (Portugal) Vila Real

=== ETTU ===
- January 12 – TBD: European Champions League (Men's and Women's)
- January 12 – TBD: ETTU Cup (Men's and Women's)
- January 28 – TBD: ETTU Europe Trophy

== Taekwondo ==
- April 21 – 24: 2022 World Taekwondo Poomsae Championships in (South Korea) Goyang
- May 19 – 22: 2022 European Taekwondo Championships and 2022 Para-European Taekwondo Championships in (United Kingdom) Manchester

== Tennis ==
=== Grand Slam ===
- January 17 – 30: 2022 Australian Open
  - Men's singles: (Spain) Rafael Nadal def. (Russia) Daniil Medvedev, 2–6, 6–7^{(5–7)}, 6–4, 6–4, 7–5.
  - Men's doubles: (Australia) Thanasi Kokkinakis & (Australia) Nick Kyrgios def. (Australia) Matthew Ebden & (Australia) Max Purcell, 7–5, 6–4
  - Women's singles: (Australia) Ashleigh Barty def. (United States) Danielle Collins, 6–3, 7–6^{(7–2)}
  - Women's doubles: (Czech Republic) Barbora Krejčíková & (Czech Republic) Kateřina Siniaková def. (Kazakhstan) Anna Danilina & (Brazil) Beatriz Haddad Maia, 6–7^{(3–7)}, 6–4, 6–4
  - Mixed doubles: (France) Kristina Mladenovic & (Croatia) Ivan Dodig def. (Australia) Jaimee Fourlis & (Australia) Jason Kubler, 6–3, 6–4
- May 29 – June 11: 2022 French Open
  - Men's singles: (Spain) Rafael Nadal def. (Norway) Casper Ruud, 6–3, 6–3, 6–0.
  - Men's doubles: (El Salvador) Marcelo Arévalo & (Netherlands) Jean-Julien Rojer def. (Croatia) Ivan Dodig & (United States) Austin Krajicek, 6–7^{(4–7)}, 7–6^{(7–5)}, 6–3.
  - Women's singles: (Poland) Iga Świątek def. (United States) Coco Gauff, 6–1, 6–3.
  - Women's doubles: (France) Caroline Garcia & (France) Kristina Mladenovic def. (United States) Coco Gauff & (United States) Jessica Pegula, 2–6, 6–3, 6–2.
  - Mixed doubles: (Japan) Ena Shibahara & (Netherlands) Wesley Koolhof def. (Norway) Ulrikke Eikeri & (Belgium) Joran Vliegen, 7–6^{(7–5)}, 6–2.
- June 27 – July 10: 2022 Wimbledon Championships
  - Men's singles: (Serbia) Novak Djokovic def. (Australia) Nick Kyrgios, 4–6, 6–3, 6–4, 7–6^{(7–3)}.
  - Men's doubles: (Australia) Matthew Ebden & (Australia) Max Purcell def. (Croatia) Nikola Mektić & (Croatia) Mate Pavić, 7–6^{(7–5)}, 6–7^{(3–7)}, 4–6, 6–4, 7–6^{(10–2)}.
  - Women's singles: (Kazakhstan) Elena Rybakina def. (Tunisia) Ons Jabeur, 3–6, 6–2, 6–2.
  - Women's doubles: (Czech Republic) Barbora Krejčiková & (Czech Republic) Kateřina Siniaková def. (Belgium) Elise Mertens & (China) Zhang Shuai, 6–2, 6–4.
  - Mixed doubles: (United Kingdom) Neal Skupski & (United States) Desirae Krawczyk def. (Australia) Matthew Ebden & (Australia) Samantha Stosur, 6–4, 6–3.
- August 28 – September 11: 2022 U.S. Open
  - Men's singles: (Spain) Carlos Alcaraz def. (Norway) Casper Ruud, 6–4, 2–6, 7–6^{(7–1)}, 6–3.
  - Men's doubles: (United States) Rajeev Ram & (United Kingdom) Joe Salisbury def. (Netherlands) Wesley Koolhof & (United Kingdom) Neal Skupski, 7–6^{(7–4)}, 7–5.
  - Women's singles: (Poland) Iga Świątek def. (Tunisia) Ons Jabeur, 6–2, 7–6^{(7–5)}.
  - Women's doubles: (Czech Republic) Barbora Krejčíková and (Czech Republic) Kateřina Siniaková def. (United States) Caty McNally & (United States) Taylor Townsend, 3–6, 7–5, 6–1.
  - Mixed doubles: (Australia) Storm Sanders & (Australia) John Peers def. (Belgium) Kirsten Flipkens & (France) Édouard Roger-Vasselin, 4–6, 6–4, [10–7].

=== 2022 ATP Tour ===
ATP Tour Masters 1000

- March 7 – 20: 2022 BNP Paribas Open in (United States) Indian Wells
  - Singles: (United States) Taylor Fritz def. (Spain) Rafael Nadal, 6–3, 7–6^{(7–5)}.
  - Doubles: (United States) John Isner & (United States) Jack Sock def. (Netherlands) Wesley Koolhof & (United Kingdom) Neal Skupski, 7–6^{(7–5)}, 6–4.
- March 21 – April 3: 2022 Miami Open in (United States) Miami Gardens
  - Singles: (Spain) Carlos Alcaraz def. (Norway) Casper Ruud, 7–5, 6–4.
  - Doubles: (Poland) Hubert Hurkacz & (United States) John Isner def. (Mexico) Santiago González & (France) Édouard Roger-Vasselin, 7–6^{(7–4)}, 6–3.
- April 10 – 17: 2022 Monte-Carlo Masters in (Monaco) Monte Carlo
  - Singles: (Greece) Stefanos Tsitsipas def. (Spain) Alejandro Davidovich Fokina, 6–3, 7–6^{(7–3)}.
  - Doubles: (United States) Rajeev Ram & (United Kingdom) Joe Salisbury def. (Colombia) Juan Sebastián Cabal & (Colombia) Robert Farah, 6–4, 3–6, [10–7].
- May 2 – 8: 2022 Mutua Madrid Open in (Spain) Madrid
  - Singles: (Spain) Carlos Alcaraz def. (Germany) Alexander Zverev, 6–3, 6–1.
  - Doubles: (Netherlands) Wesley Koolhof & (United Kingdom) Neal Skupski def. (Colombia) Juan Sebastián Cabal & (Colombia) Robert Farah, 6–7^{(4–7)}, 6–4, [10–5].
- May 9 – 15: 2022 Italian Open in (Italy) Rome
  - Singles: (Serbia) Novak Djokovic def. (Greece) Stefanos Tsitsipas, 6–0, 7–6^{(7–5)}.
  - Doubles: (Croatia) Nikola Mektić & (Croatia) Mate Pavić def. (United States) John Isner & (Argentina) Diego Schwartzman, 6–2, 6–7^{(6–8)}, [12–10].

ATP Tour 500

- February 7 – 13: 2022 ABN AMRO World Tennis Tournament in (Netherlands) Rotterdam
  - Singles: (Canada) Félix Auger-Aliassime def. (Greece) Stefanos Tsitsipas, 6–4, 6–2.
  - Doubles: (Netherlands) Robin Haase & (Netherlands) Matwé Middelkoop def. (South Africa) Lloyd Harris & (Germany) Tim Pütz, 4–6, 7–6^{(7–5)}, [10–5].
- February 14 – 20: 2022 Rio Open in (Brazil) Rio de Janeiro
  - Singles: (Spain) Carlos Alcaraz def. (Argentina) Diego Schwartzman, 6–4, 6–2.
  - Doubles: (Italy) Simone Bolelli & (Italy) Fabio Fognini def. (United Kingdom) Jamie Murray & (Brazil) Bruno Soares, 7–5, 6–7^{(2–7)}, [10–6].
- February 21 – 26: 2022 Dubai Tennis Championships in (United Arab Emirates) Dubai
  - Singles: (Russia) Andrey Rublev def. (Czech Republic) Jiří Veselý, 6–3, 6–4.
  - Doubles: (Germany) Tim Pütz & (New Zealand) Michael Venus def. (Croatia) Nikola Mektić & (Croatia) Mate Pavić, 6–3, 6–7^{(5–7)}, [16–14].
- February 21 – 27: 2022 Abierto Mexicano Telcel in (Mexico) Acapulco
  - Singles: (Spain) Rafael Nadal def. (United Kingdom) Cameron Norrie, 6–4, 6–4.
  - Doubles: (Spain) Feliciano López & (Greece) Stefanos Tsitsipas def. (El Salvador) Marcelo Arévalo & (Netherlands) Jean-Julien Rojer, 7–5, 6–4.
- April 18 – 24: 2022 Barcelona Open Banc Sabadell in (Spain) Barcelona
  - Singles: (Spain) Carlos Alcaraz def. (Spain) Pablo Carreño Busta, 6–3, 6–2.
  - Doubles: (Germany) Kevin Krawietz & (Germany) Andreas Mies def. (Netherlands) Wesley Koolhof & (United Kingdom) Neal Skupski, 6–7^{(3–7)}, 7–6^{(7–5)}, [10–6].

ATP Tour 250

- January 3 – 9: 2022 Adelaide International 1 in (Australia) Adelaide
  - Singles: (France) Gaël Monfils def. (Russia) Karen Khachanov, 6–4, 6–4.
  - Doubles: (India) Rohan Bopanna & (India) Ramkumar Ramanathan def. (Croatia) Ivan Dodig & (Brazil) Marcelo Melo, 7–6^{(8–6)}, 6–1.
- January 3 – 9: 2022 Melbourne Summer Set in (Australia) Melbourne
  - Singles: (Spain) Rafael Nadal def. (United States) Maxime Cressy, 7–6^{(8–6)}, 6–3.
  - Doubles: (Netherlands) Wesley Koolhof & (United Kingdom) Neal Skupski def. (Kazakhstan) Aleksandr Nedovyesov & (Pakistan) Aisam-ul-Haq Qureshi, 6–4, 6–4.
- January 10 – 16: 2022 Adelaide International 2 in (Australia) Adelaide
  - Singles: (Australia) Thanasi Kokkinakis def. (France) Arthur Rinderknech, 6–7^{(6–8)}, 7–6^{(7–5)}, 6–3.
  - Doubles: (Netherlands) Wesley Koolhof & (United Kingdom) Neal Skupski def. (Uruguay) Ariel Behar & (Ecuador) Gonzalo Escobar, 7–6^{(7–5)}, 6–4.
- January 10 – 16: 2022 Sydney International in (Australia) Sydney
  - Singles: (Russia) Aslan Karatsev def. (United Kingdom) Andy Murray, 6–3, 6–3.
  - Doubles: (Australia) John Peers & (Slovakia) Filip Polášek def. (Italy) Simone Bolelli & (Italy) Fabio Fognini, 7–5, 7–5.
- January 31 – February 6: 2022 Open Sud de France in Montpellier
  - Singles: (Kazakhstan) Alexander Bublik def. (Germany) Alexander Zverev, 6–4, 6–3.
  - Doubles: (France) Pierre-Hugues Herbert & (France) Nicolas Mahut def. (United Kingdom) Lloyd Glasspool & (Finland) Harri Heliövaara, 4–6, 7–6^{(7–3)}, [12–10].
- January 31 – February 6: 2022 Maharashtra Open in (India) Pune
  - Singles: (Portugal) João Sousa def. (Finland) Emil Ruusuvuori, 7–6^{(11–9)}, 4–6, 6–1.
  - Doubles: (India) Rohan Bopanna & (India) Ramkumar Ramanathan def. (Australia) Luke Saville & (Australia) John-Patrick Smith, 6–7^{(10–12)}, 6–3, [10–6].
- January 31 – February 6: 2022 Córdoba Open in (Argentina) Córdoba
  - Singles: (Spain) Albert Ramos Viñolas def. (Chile) Alejandro Tabilo, 4–6, 6–3, 6–4.
  - Doubles: (Mexico) Santiago González & (Argentina) Andrés Molteni def. (Slovakia) Andrej Martin & (Austria) Tristan-Samuel Weissborn, 7–5, 6–3.
- February 7 – 13: 2022 Argentina Open in Buenos Aires
  - Singles: (Norway) Casper Ruud def. (Argentina) Diego Schwartzman, 5–7, 6–2, 6–3.
  - Doubles: (Mexico) Santiago González & (Argentina) Andrés Molteni def. (Italy) Fabio Fognini & (Argentina) Horacio Zeballos, 6–1, 6–1.
- February 7 – 13: 2022 Dallas Open in (United States) Dallas
  - Singles: (United States) Reilly Opelka def. (United States) Jenson Brooksby, 7–6^{(7–5)}, 7–6^{(7–3)}.
  - Doubles: (El Salvador) Marcelo Arévalo & (Netherlands) Jean-Julien Rojer def. (United Kingdom) Lloyd Glasspool & (Finland) Harri Heliövaara, 7–6^{(7–4)}, 6–4.
- February 14 – 19: 2022 Qatar ExxonMobil Open in Doha
  - Singles: (Spain) Roberto Bautista Agut def. (Georgia (country)) Nikoloz Basilashvili, 6–3, 6–4.
  - Doubles: (Netherlands) Wesley Koolhof & (United Kingdom) Neal Skupski def. (India) Rohan Bopanna & (Canada) Denis Shapovalov, 7–6^{(7–4)}, 6–1.
- February 14 – 20: 2022 Delray Beach Open in (United States) Delray Beach
  - Singles: (United Kingdom) Cameron Norrie def. (United States) Reilly Opelka, 7–6^{(7–1)}, 7–6^{(7–4)}.
  - Doubles: (El Salvador) Marcelo Arévalo & (Netherlands) Jean-Julien Rojer def. (Kazakhstan) Aleksandr Nedovyesov & (Pakistan) Aisam-ul-Haq Qureshi, 6–2, 6–7^{(5–7)}, [10–4].
- February 14 – 20: 2022 Open 13 in (France) Marseille
  - Singles: (Russia) Andrey Rublev def. (Canada) Félix Auger-Aliassime, 7–5, 7–6^{(7–4)}.
  - Doubles: (Ukraine) Denys Molchanov & (Russia) Andrey Rublev def. (South Africa) Raven Klaasen & (Japan) Ben McLachlan, 4–6, 7–5, [10–7].
- February 21 – 27: 2022 Chile Open in Santiago
  - Singles: (Spain) Pedro Martínez def. (Argentina) Sebastián Báez, 4–6, 6–4, 6–4.
  - Doubles: (Brazil) Rafael Matos & (Brazil) Felipe Meligeni Alves def. (Sweden) André Göransson & (United States) Nathaniel Lammons, 7–6^{(10–8)}, 7–6^{(7–3)}.
- April 4 – 10: 2022 U.S. Men's Clay Court Championships in (United States) Houston
  - Singles: (United States) Reilly Opelka def. (United States) John Isner, 6–3, 7–6^{(9–7)}.
  - Doubles: (Australia) Matthew Ebden & (Australia) Max Purcell def. (Serbia) Ivan Sabanov & (Serbia) Matej Sabanov, 6–3, 6–3.
- April 4 – 10: 2022 Grand Prix Hassan II in (Morocco) Marrakesh
  - Singles: (Belgium) David Goffin def. (Slovakia) Alex Molčan, 3–6, 6–3, 6–3.
  - Doubles: (Brazil) Rafael Matos & (Spain) David Vega Hernández def. (Italy) Andrea Vavassori & (Poland) Jan Zieliński, 6–1, 7–5.
- April 18 – 24: 2022 Serbia Open in Belgrade
  - Singles: Andrey Rublev def. (Serbia) Novak Djokovic, 6–2, 6–7^{(4–7)}, 6–0.
  - Doubles: (Uruguay) Ariel Behar & (Ecuador) Gonzalo Escobar def. (Croatia) Nikola Mektić & (Croatia) Mate Pavić, 6–2, 3–6, [10–6].
- April 25 – May 1: 2022 Estoril Open in (Portugal) Cascais
  - Singles: (Argentina) Sebastián Báez def. (United States) Frances Tiafoe, 6–3, 6–2.
  - Doubles: (Portugal) Nuno Borges & (Portugal) Francisco Cabral def. (Argentina) Máximo González & (Sweden) André Göransson, 6–2, 6–3.
- April 25 – May 1: 2022 BMW Open in (Germany) Munich
  - Singles: (Denmark) Holger Rune def. (Netherlands) Botic van de Zandschulp, 3–4, ret.
  - Doubles: (Germany) Kevin Krawietz & (Germany) Andreas Mies def. (Brazil) Rafael Matos & (Spain) David Vega Hernández, 4–6, 6–4, [10–7].
- May 16 – 21: 2022 Geneva Open in (Switzerland) Geneva
  - Singles: (Norway) Casper Ruud def. (Portugal) João Sousa, 7–6^{(7–3)}, 4–6, 7–6^{(7–1)}.
  - Doubles: (Croatia) Nikola Mektić & (Croatia) Mate Pavić def. (Spain) Pablo Andújar & (Netherlands) Matwé Middelkoop, 2–6, 6–2, [10–3].
- May 16 – 21: 2022 ATP Lyon Open in (France) Lyon
  - Singles: (United Kingdom) Cameron Norrie def. (Slovakia) Alex Molčan, 6–3, 6–7^{(3–7)}, 6–1.
  - Doubles: (Croatia) Ivan Dodig & (United States) Austin Krajicek def. (Argentina) Máximo González & (Brazil) Marcelo Melo, 6–3, 6–4.

Teams

- January 1 – 9: 2022 ATP Cup in (Australia) Sydney
  - In the final, Canada def. Spain, 2–0.

=== 2022 WTA Tour ===
WTA 1000

- February 21 – 27: 2022 Qatar Total Open in Doha
  - Singles: (Poland) Iga Świątek def. (Estonia) Anett Kontaveit, 6–2, 6–0.
  - Doubles: (United States) Coco Gauff & (United States) Jessica Pegula def. (Russia) Veronika Kudermetova & (Belgium) Elise Mertens, 3–6, 7–5, [10–5].
- March 7 – 20: 2022 BNP Paribas Open in (United States) Indian Wells
  - Singles: (Poland) Iga Świątek def. (Greece) Maria Sakkari, 6–4, 6–1.
  - Doubles: (China) Xu Yifan & (China) Yang Zhaoxuan def. (United States) Asia Muhammad & (Japan) Ena Shibahara, 7–5, 7–6^{(7–4)}.
- March 22 – April 3: 2022 Miami Open in (United States) Miami Gardens
  - Singles: (Poland) Iga Świątek def. (Japan) Naomi Osaka, 6–4, 6–0.
  - Doubles: (Germany) Laura Siegemund & Vera Zvonareva def. Veronika Kudermetova & (Belgium) Elise Mertens, 7–6^{(7–3)}, 7–5.
- April 25 – May 8: 2022 Mutua Madrid Open in (Spain) Madrid
  - Singles: (Tunisia) Ons Jabeur def. (United States) Jessica Pegula, 7–5, 0–6, 6–2.
  - Doubles: (Canada) Gabriela Dabrowski & (Mexico) Giuliana Olmos def. (United States) Desirae Krawczyk & (Netherlands) Demi Schuurs, 7–6^{(7–1)}, 5–7, [10–7].
- May 9 – 15: 2022 Italian Open in (Italy) Rome
  - Singles: (Poland) Iga Świątek def. (Tunisia) Ons Jabeur, 6–2, 6–2.
  - Doubles: Veronika Kudermetova & Anastasia Pavlyuchenkova def. (Canada) Gabriela Dabrowski & (Mexico) Giuliana Olmos, 1–6, 6–4, [10–7].

WTA 500

- January 4 – 9: 2022 Adelaide International 1 in (Australia) Adelaide
  - Singles: (Australia) Ashleigh Barty def. (Kazakhstan) Elena Rybakina, 6–3, 6–2.
  - Doubles: (Australia) Ashleigh Barty & (Australia) Storm Sanders def. (Croatia) Darija Jurak & (Slovenia) Andreja Klepač, 6–1, 6–4.
- January 10 – 16: 2022 Sydney International in (Australia) Sydney
  - Singles: (Spain) Paula Badosa def. (Czech Republic) Barbora Krejčíková, 6–3, 4–6, 7–6^{(7–4)}.
  - Doubles: (Kazakhstan) Anna Danilina & (Brazil) Beatriz Haddad Maia def. (Germany) Vivian Heisen & (Hungary) Panna Udvardy, 4–6, 7–5, [10–8].
- February 6 – 13: 2022 St. Petersburg Ladies' Trophy in (Russia) Saint Petersburg
  - Singles: (Estonia) Anett Kontaveit def. (Greece) Maria Sakkari, 5–7, 7–6^{(7–4)}, 7–5.
  - Doubles: (Russia) Anna Kalinskaya & (United States) Caty McNally def. (Poland) Alicja Rosolska & (New Zealand) Erin Routliffe, 6–3, 7–6^{(7–5)}, [10–4].
- February 14 – 19: 2022 Dubai Tennis Championships in (United Arab Emirates) Dubai
  - Singles: (Latvia) Jeļena Ostapenko def. (Russia) Veronika Kudermetova, 6–0, 6–4.
  - Doubles: (Russia) Veronika Kudermetova & (Belgium) Elise Mertens def. (Ukraine) Lyudmyla Kichenok & (Latvia) Jeļena Ostapenko, 6–1, 6–3.
- April 4 – 10: 2022 Charleston Open in (United States) Charleston
  - Singles: (Switzerland) Belinda Bencic def. (Tunisia) Ons Jabeur, 6–1, 5–7, 6–4.
  - Doubles: (Slovenia) Andreja Klepač & (Poland) Magda Linette def. (Czech Republic) Lucie Hradecká & (India) Sania Mirza, 6–2, 4–6, [10–7].
- April 18 – 24: 2022 Porsche Tennis Grand Prix in (Germany) Stuttgart
  - Singles: (Poland) Iga Świątek def. Aryna Sabalenka, 6–2, 6–2.
  - Doubles: (United States) Desirae Krawczyk & (Netherlands) Demi Schuurs def. (United States) Coco Gauff & (China) Zhang Shuai, 6–3, 6–4.

WTA 250

- January 4 – 9: 2022 Melbourne Summer Set 1 in (Australia) Melbourne
  - Singles: (Romania) Simona Halep def. (Russia) Veronika Kudermetova, 6–2, 6–3.
  - Doubles: (United States) Asia Muhammad & (United States) Jessica Pegula def. (Italy) Sara Errani & (Italy) Jasmine Paolini, 6–3, 6–1.
- January 4 – 9: 2022 Melbourne Summer Set 2 in (Australia) Melbourne
  - Singles: (United States) Amanda Anisimova def. (Belarus) Aliaksandra Sasnovich, 7–5, 1–6, 6–4.
  - Doubles: (United States) Bernarda Pera & (Czech Republic) Kateřina Siniaková def. (Czech Republic) Tereza Martincová & (Egypt) Mayar Sherif, 6–2, 6–7^{(7–9)}, [10–5].
- January 10 – 16: 2022 Adelaide International 2 in (Australia) Adelaide
  - Singles: (United States) Madison Keys def. (United States) Alison Riske, 6–1, 6–2.
  - Doubles: (Japan) Eri Hozumi & (Japan) Makoto Ninomiya def. (Czech Republic) Tereza Martincová & (Czech Republic) Markéta Vondroušová, 1–6, 7–6^{(7–4)}, [10–7].
- February 21 – 27: 2022 Abierto Zapopan in (Mexico) Guadalajara
  - Singles: (United States) Sloane Stephens def. (Czech Republic) Marie Bouzková, 7–5, 1–6, 6–2.
  - Doubles: (United States) Kaitlyn Christian & (Belarus) Lidziya Marozava def. (China) Wang Xinyu & (China) Zhu Lin, 7–5, 6–3.
- February 28 – March 6: 2022 WTA Lyon Open in (France) Lyon
  - Singles: (China) Zhang Shuai def. (Ukraine) Dayana Yastremska, 3–6, 6–3, 6–4.
  - Doubles: (Germany) Laura Siegemund & Vera Zvonareva def. (United Kingdom) Alicia Barnett & (United Kingdom) Olivia Nicholls, 7–5, 6–1.
- February 28 – March 6: 2022 Monterrey Open in (Mexico) Monterrey
  - Singles: (Canada) Leylah Fernandez def. (Colombia) Camila Osorio, 6–7^{(5–7)}, 6–4, 7–6^{(7–3)}.
  - Doubles: (United States) Catherine Harrison & (United States) Sabrina Santamaria def. (China) Han Xinyun & Yana Sizikova, 1–6, 7–5, [10–6].
- April 4 – 10: 2022 Copa Colsanitas in (Colombia) Bogotá
  - Singles: (Germany) Tatjana Maria def. (Brazil) Laura Pigossi, 6–3, 4–6, 6–2.
  - Doubles: (Australia) Astra Sharma & (Indonesia) Aldila Sutjiadi def. (United States) Emina Bektas & (United Kingdom) Tara Moore, 4–6, 6–4, [11–9].
- April 18 – 24: 2022 İstanbul Cup in (Turkey) Istanbul
  - Singles: Anastasia Potapova def. Veronika Kudermetova, 6–3, 6–1.
  - Doubles: (Czech Republic) Marie Bouzková & (Spain) Sara Sorribes Tormo def. Natela Dzalamidze & Kamilla Rakhimova, 6–3, 6–4.
- May 16 – 21: 2022 Grand Prix SAR La Princesse Lalla Meryem in (Morocco) Rabat
  - Singles: (Italy) Martina Trevisan def. (United States) Claire Liu, 6–2, 6–1.
  - Doubles: (Japan) Eri Hozumi & (Japan) Makoto Ninomiya def. (Romania) Monica Niculescu & Alexandra Panova, 6–7^{(7–9)}, 6–3, [10–8].
- May 16 – 21: 2022 Internationaux de Strasbourg in (France) Strasbourg
  - Singles: (Germany) Angelique Kerber def. (Slovenia) Kaja Juvan, 7–6^{(7–5)}, 6–7^{(0–7)}, 7–6^{(7–5)}.
  - Doubles: (United States) Nicole Melichar-Martinez & (Australia) Daria Saville def. (Czech Republic) Lucie Hradecká & (Czech Republic) Sania Mirza, 5–7, 7–5, [10–6].

=== 2022 ATP Challenger Tour ===
Challenger 80

- January 3 – 9: 2022 Bendigo International in (Australia) Bendigo
  - Singles: (United States) Ernesto Escobedo def. (France) Enzo Couacaud, 5–7, 6–3, 7–5.
  - Doubles: (Belgium) Ruben Bemelmans & (Germany) Daniel Masur def. (France) Enzo Couacaud & (Slovenia) Blaž Rola, 7–6^{(7–2)}, 6–4.
- January 3 – 9: 2022 Traralgon International in (Australia) Traralgon
  - Singles: (Czech Republic) Tomáš Macháč def. (United States) Bjorn Fratangelo, 7–6^{(7–2)}, 6–3.
  - Doubles: (France) Manuel Guinard & (Czech Republic) Zdeněk Kolář def. (Switzerland) Marc-Andrea Hüsler & (Switzerland) Dominic Stricker, 6–3, 6–4.
- January 10 – 16: 2022 Città di Forlì II in (Italy) Forlì
  - Singles: (United Kingdom) Jack Draper vs. (United Kingdom) Jay Clarke, 6–3, 6–0.
  - Doubles: (France) Sadio Doumbia & (France) Fabien Reboul def. (Colombia) Nicolás Mejía & (United States) Alexander Ritschard, 6–2, 6–3.
- January 17 – 23: 2022 Città di Forlì III in (Italy) Forlì
  - Singles: (Russia) Pavel Kotov def. (France) Quentin Halys, 7–5, 6^{(5)}–7^{(7)}, 6–3.
  - Doubles: (Romania) Victor Vlad Cornea & (Germany) Fabian Fallert def. (Czech Republic) Jonáš Forejtek & (Netherlands) Jelle Sels 6–4, 6–7^{(6–8)}, [10–7].
- January 17 – 23: 2022 Challenger Concepción in (Chile) Concepción
  - Singles: (Colombia) Daniel Elahi Galán def. (Argentina) Santiago Rodríguez Taverna 6–1, 3–6, 6–3.
  - Doubles: (Ecuador) Diego Hidalgo & (Colombia) Cristian Rodríguez def. (Argentina) Francisco Cerúndolo & (Argentina) Camilo Ugo Carabelli 6–2, 6–0.
- January 24 – 30: 2022 Open Quimper Bretagne in (France) Quimper
  - Singles: (Canada) Vasek Pospisil def. (France) Grégoire Barrère 6–4, 3–6, 6–1.
  - Doubles: (France) Albano Olivetti & (Spain) David Vega Hernández def. (Netherlands) Sander Arends & (Netherlands) David Pel 3–6, 6–4, [10–8].
- January 24 – 30: 2022 Columbus Challenger in (United States) Columbus
  - Singles: (Japan) Yoshihito Nishioka def. (Switzerland) Dominic Stricker 6–2, 6–4.
  - Doubles: (United States) Tennys Sandgren & (Denmark) Mikael Torpegaard def. (Switzerland) Luca Margaroli & (Japan) Yasutaka Uchiyama 5–7, 6–4, [10–5].
- January 24 – 30: 2022 Santa Cruz Challenger in (Bolivia) Santa Cruz de la Sierra
  - Singles: (Argentina) Francisco Cerúndolo def. (Argentina) Camilo Ugo Carabelli 6–4, 6–3.
  - Doubles: (Ecuador) Diego Hidalgo & (Colombia) Cristian Rodríguez def. (Slovakia) Andrej Martin & (Austria) Tristan-Samuel Weissborn 4–6, 6–3, [10–8].
- January 31 – February 6: 2022 Cleveland Challenger in (United States) Cleveland
  - Singles: (Switzerland) Dominic Stricker def. (Japan) Yoshihito Nishioka 7–5, 6–1.
  - Doubles: (United States) William Blumberg & (United States) Max Schnur def. (United States) Robert Galloway & (United States) Jackson Withrow 6–3, 7–6^{(7–4)}.
- February 7 – 13: 2022 Bengaluru Open in (India) Bangalore
  - Singles: (Chinese Taipei) Tseng Chun-hsin def. (Croatia) Borna Gojo 6–4, 7–5.
  - Doubles: (India) Saketh Myneni & (India) Ramkumar Ramanathan def. (France) Hugo Grenier & (France) Alexandre Müller 6–3, 6–2.
- February 7 – 13: 2022 Challenger La Manche in (France) Cherbourg-en-Cotentin
  - Singles: (France) Benjamin Bonzi def. (France) Constant Lestienne 6–4, 2–6, 6–4.
  - Doubles: (France) Jonathan Eysseric & (France) Quentin Halys def. (Germany) Hendrik Jebens & (Germany) Niklas Schell 7–6^{(8–6)}, 6–2.
- February 14 – 20: 2022 Bengaluru Open II in (India) Bangalore
  - Singles: (Australia) Aleksandar Vukic def. (Bulgaria) Dimitar Kuzmanov, 6–4, 6–4.
  - Doubles: (Austria) Alexander Erler & (India) Arjun Kadhe def. (India) Saketh Myneni & (India) Ramkumar Ramanathan, 6–3, 6–7^{(4–7)}, [10–7].
- February 14 – 20: 2022 Città di Forlì IV in (Italy) Forlì
  - Singles: (United Kingdom) Jack Draper def. (Netherlands) Tim van Rijthoven, 6–1, 6–2.
  - Doubles: (Romania) Victor Vlad Cornea & (Germany) Fabian Fallert def. (Croatia) Antonio Šančić & (Slovakia) Igor Zelenay, 6–4, 3–6, [10–2].

Challenger 50

- January 3 – 9: 2022 Challenger de Tigre in (Argentina) Buenos Aires
  - Singles: (Argentina) Facundo Díaz Acosta vs. (Argentina) Santiago Rodríguez Taverna, 6–4, 6–2.
  - Doubles: (Peru) Conner Huertas del Pino & (Germany) Mats Rosenkranz def. (Argentina) Matías Franco Descotte & (Argentina) Facundo Díaz Acosta, 0–0, 6–5, ret.
- January 3 – 9: 2022 Città di Forlì in (Italy) Forlì
  - Singles: (Italy) Luca Nardi def. (India) Mukund Sasikumar, 6–3, 6–1.
  - Doubles: (Italy) Marco Bortolotti & (India) Arjun Kadhe def. (Belgium) Michael Geerts & (United States) Alexander Ritschard, 7–6^{(7–5)}, 6–2.
- January 10 – 16: 2022 Aberto Santa Catarina de Tenis in (Brazil) Blumenau
  - Singles: (Brazil) Igor Marcondes vs. (Argentina) Juan Bautista Torres
  - Doubles: (Bolivia) Boris Arias & (Bolivia) Federico Zeballos def. (Ecuador) Diego Hidalgo & (Colombia) Cristian Rodríguez, 7–6^{(7–3)}, 6–1.

== Teqball ==
=== 2022 European Teqball Tour ===
- February 25 – 27: European Teqball Tour #1 in (Portugal) Lisbon

=== 2022 US Teqball Tour ===
- January 15 & 16: USA Teqball Tour #1 in (United States) San Diego
  - In the final, (France) Hugo Rabeux & (France) Julien Grondin def. (Poland) Bartłomiej Frańczuk & (Hungary) Martin Csereklye, 2–1 (11–12, 12–8, 12–8). (Hungary) Ádám Blázsovics & (Hungary) Csaba Bányik took third place.

== Triathlon ==
- February 3 – 6: 2022 World Triathlon Winter Championships and 2022 World Triathlon Winter Duathlon Championships in (Andorra) Sant Julià de Lòria
  - Winners: (Italy) Franco Pesavento (m) / (Russia) Anna Medvedeva (f)
  - Duathlon winners: (Italy) Franco Pesavento (m) / (Russia) Anna Medvedeva (f)
  - U23 winners: (Italy) Mattia Tanara (m) / (Norway) Julie Meinicke (f)
  - U23 Duathlon winners: (Italy) Mattia Tanara (m) / (Norway) Julie Meinicke (f)
  - Juniors winners: (Spain) Alvaro López Lucia (m) / (Norway) Victoria Nitteberg (f)
  - Juniors Duathlon winners: (Spain) Alvaro López Lucia (m) / (Norway) Victoria Nitteberg (f)
- February 18 & 19: 2022 Europe Triathlon Winter Championships in (Italy) Rotzo
  - Winners: (Russia) Pavel Andreev (m) / (Russia) Daria Rogozina (f)
  - U23 winners: (Russia) Danila Egorov (m) / (Russia) Valeria Kuznetsova (f)
  - Juniors winners: (Italy) Lukas Lanzinger (m) / (Russia) Kseniia Skvortsova (f)
- February 20: 2022 South American Triathlon Championships in (Chile) Villarrica
  - Winners: (Brazil) Manoel Messias (m) / (Brazil) Luisa Baptista (f)
- February 26: 2022 Pan American Duathlon Championships in (Colombia) Tocancipá
  - Winners: (Colombia) Camilo Duarte Escamilla (m) / (Mexico) Jazmín Aguilar (f)
  - U23 winner: (Colombia) Hernando Córdoba
  - Juniors winners: (Colombia) Nicolás Gomez (m) / (Colombia) Lilian Sofía Molina Marín (f)
- May 7: 2022 World Triathlon Middle Distance Duathlon Championships in (Denmark) Viborg
  - Winners: (Slovakia) Ondrej Kubo (m) / (Switzerland) Melanie Maurer (f)
- May 7: 2021 Ironman World Championship in (United States) St. George
  - Winners: (Norway) Kristian Blummenfelt (m) / (Switzerland) Daniela Ryf (f)
- June 6 – 12: 2022 World Triathlon Multisport Championships in (Romania) Târgu Mureș
- June 22 – 26: 2022 World Triathlon Sprint & Relay Championships in (Canada) Montreal
- October 6: 2022 Ironman World Championship in (United States) Kailua-Kona
- October 28: 2022 Ironman 70.3 World Championship in (United States) St. George

=== 2022 World Triathlon Championship Series ===
- May 14 & 15: WTCS #1 in (Japan) Yokohama
  - Winners: (United Kingdom) Alex Yee (m) / (United Kingdom) Georgia Taylor-Brown (f)

=== 2022 World Triathlon Cup ===
- May 28: WTC #1 in (Italy) Arzachena
  - Sprint winners: (United Kingdom) Jonny Brownlee (m) / (France) Sandra Dodet (f)
- July 24: WTC #2 in (Spain) Pontevedra
  - Winners: (Spain) Sergio Baxter (m) / (Czech Republic) Petra Kuříková (f)

=== 2022 Africa Triathlon Cup ===
- February 13: ATC #1 in (South Africa) Maselspoort
  - Winners: (South Africa) Nicholas Quenet (m) / (South Africa) Shanae Williams (f)

=== 2022 Oceania Triathlon Cup ===
- February 26: OTC #1 in (Australia) Devonport
  - Winners: (Australia) Matthew Hauser (m) / (Australia) Matilda Offord (f)

=== 2022 Americas Triathlon Cup ===
- February 13: ATC #1 in (Chile) Viña del Mar
  - Winners: (Brazil) Manoel Messias (m) / (Brazil) Luisa Baptista (f)
- February 20: ATC #2 in (Chile) Villarrica
  - Winners: (Brazil) Manoel Messias (m) / (Brazil) Luisa Baptista (f)

== Tug of war ==
- March 3 – 6: 2022 Tug of War World Indoor Championship in (Netherlands) Doetinchem
- September 14 – 18: 2022 Tug of War World Outdoor Championship in (Netherlands) Holten

== Underwater sports ==
- June 20 – 26: 2022 Finswimming European Junior Championships in (Poland) Poznań
- June 25 – July 1: 2022 European Championships in Underwater Rugby in (Norway) Stavanger
- July 18 – 23: 2022 Finswimming Indoor World Championships in (Colombia) Cali
- August 13 & 14: 2022 Freshwater Spearfishing European Championships in (Finland) Punkaharju
- August 28 – September 4: 2022 Underwater Orienteering European Championships in (Hungary) Gyékényes
- September 12 – 17: 2022 Finswimming Open Water World Championships in (Italy) Viverone

=== 2022 World Cup ===
- January 27 – 31: CMAS Finswimming World Cup "Pool and Open Water" in (Egypt) Sharm el-Sheikh
  - Canceled.
- February 25 – 27: Finswimming World Cup – Round Swimming Pool in (Hungary) Eger
  - Winners: (Germany) Max Poschart (m) / (Hungary) Dorottya Pernyész (f)
  - Youth winners: (Hungary) Larion Lipők (m) / (Hungary) Dorottya Pernyész (f)
  - Teams Champion: Tomsk Oblast
  - National Federations Champion: (Colombia) Colombian Federation of Underwater Activities
- March 18 – 20: Finswimming World Cup – Round Swimming Pool in (Italy) Lignano Sabbiadoro
- April 1 & 2: FISU University World Cup Finswimming in (Italy) Lignano Sabbiadoro
- April 22 – 24: Finswimming World Cup – Round Swimming Pool in (Germany) Leipzig
- April 28 – May 1: World Spearfishing Cup Clubs in (Croatia) Zadar
- May 13 – 15: Finswimming World Cup – Round Swimming Pool in (United States) Coral Springs
- October 21 – 25: Finswimming World Cup – Round Swimming Pool in (China) Jiangle County (final)

== University sports ==
FISU – FISU World University Championships – 2021 Summer World University Games

1. FISU World University Championship Ski Orienteering Place: Jachymov, CZECH REPUBLIC 22–26 February 2022
2. FISU World University Championship Speed Skating Place: Lake Placid, UNITED STATES OF AMERICA 2–5 March 2022
3. FISU World University Championship Cross Country Place: Aveiro, PORTUGAL 12 March 2022
4. FISU University World Cup Finswimming Place: Lignano Sabbiadoro, ITALY 1–2 April 2022
5. FISU World University Championship Sport Climbing Place: Innsbruck, AUSTRIA 14–17 June 2022
6. FISU University World Cup Floorball Place: Liberec, CZECH REPUBLIC 20–24 June 2022
7. FISU University World Cup Handball Place: Pristina, KOSOVO 11–17 July 2022
8. FISU World University Championship Futsal Place: Braga-Guimaraes, PORTUGAL 18–24 July 2022
9. FISU World University Championship Golf Place: Torino, ITALY 20–23 July 2022
10. FISU World University Championship Orienteering Place: Magglingen – Biel/Bienne, SWITZERLAND 17–21 August 2022
11. FISU World University Championship Beach Volleyball Place: Lake Placid, UNITED STATES OF AMERICA 24–28 August 2022
12. FISU World University Championship Triathlon Place: Maceio, BRAZIL 10–11 September 2022
13. FISU World University Championship Mind Sports Place: Antwerp, BELGIUM 12–17 September 2022
14. FISU World University Championship Canoe Sprint Place: Bydgoszcz, POLAND 16–18 September 2022
15. FISU World University Championship Modern Pentathlon Place: Buenos Aires, ARGENTINA 21–25 September 2022
16. FISU University World Cup Combat Sports 29 September −8 October 2022 Place : Moved from Russia to TBD
17. FISU University World Cup 3x3 Basketball Place: Xiamen, CHINA (PEOPLE'S REPUBLIC OF) 20–23 October 2022
18. FISU University World Cup Cheerleading Place: Heraklion (Creta), GREECE 4–6 November 2022
19. FISU World University Championship Squash Place: New Giza, EGYPT 7–13 November 2022 5–9 December 2022

=== Others ===
1. 2022 FISU Volunteer Leaders Academy (Online) 17 June 2022
2. International Day of University Sport (IDUS) 2022 IDUS 2022 20 September 2022
3. FISU World Forum 2022 Place: Cartago, COSTA RICA

=== Cancelled ===
1. FISU University World Cup American Football Place: Monterrey, MEXICO Cancelled
2. FISU University World Cup Powerlifting Place: 25–29 July 2022 CANCELLED
3. FISU World University Championship Waterski & Wakeboard Place: 24–27 August 2022 CANCELLED

== Volleyball ==
- May 31 – July 17: 2022 FIVB Volleyball Women's Nations League
  - In the final, Italy def. Brazil, 3–0.
- June 6 – July 24: 2022 FIVB Volleyball Men's Nations League
  - In the final, France def. United States, 3–2.
- August 26 – September 11: 2022 FIVB Volleyball Men's World Championship in Poland and Slovenia
- September 23 – October 15: 2022 FIVB Volleyball Women's World Championship in Netherlands and Poland

=== CEV ===
- September 22, 2021 – May 22: 2021–22 CEV Champions League
  - In the final, (Poland) ZAKSA Kędzierzyn-Koźle def. (Italy) Itas Trentino, 3–0.
- September 21, 2021 – May 22: 2021–22 CEV Women's Champions League
  - In the final, (Turkey) VakıfBank Istanbul def. (Italy) A. Carraro Imoco Conegliano, 3–1.
- November 9, 2021 – March 23: 2021–22 CEV Cup
  - In the final, (Italy) Vero Volley Monza def. (France) Tours VB, 3–0, 3–0.
- November 16, 2021 – March 22: 2021–22 Women's CEV Cup
  - In the final, (Turkey) Eczacıbaşı Dynavit def. (Germany) Allianz MTV Stuttgart, 3–1, 3–1.
- November 10, 2021 – March 22: 2021–22 CEV Challenge Cup
  - In the final, (France) Narbonne Volley def. (Turkey) Halkbank Ankara, 0–3, 3–1, [21–19].
- November 17, 2021 – March 23: 2021–22 CEV Women's Challenge Cup
  - In the final, (Italy) Savino Del Bene Scandicci def. (Spain) Sanaya Libby's La Laguna, 3–0, 3–0.

Regional

- October 3, 2021 –: 2021– 2022 Baltic Volleyball League
- October 2, 2021 –: 2021– 2022 Baltic Volleyball League
- September 30, 2021 –: 2021–2022 MEVZA League
- October 6, 2021 –: 2021–2022 MEVZA Women's League

== Water Polo ==
- July 30 – August 7: 2022 World Men's Youth Water Polo Championships in (Australia) Brisbane
- August 13 – 21: 2022 World Women's Youth Water Polo Championships in (Australia) Brisbane
- August 27 – September 10: 2022 European Water Polo Championship in (Croatia) Split
- August 27 – September 10: 2022 Women's European Water Polo Championship in (Croatia) Split
- September 18 – 25: 2022 LEN European U19 Water Polo Championship in (Montenegro) Podgorica

=== 2022 FINA Water Polo World League ===
- March 7 – 13: Intercontinental Cup in (Peru) Lima
  - Winners: (United States) (m) / (Australia) (f)
- April 22 – 24: Europe Women's Final in (Spain) Santa Cruz
- April 28 – 30: Europe Men's Final in (Hungary) Budapest
- July 23 – 29: Men's Super Final in (France) Strasbourg

=== LEN Champions League ===
- September 23, 2021 –: 2021–22 LEN Champions League
- September 30, 2021 –: 2021–22 LEN Euro Cup

Regional

- November 24, 2021 –: 2021–2022 Regional Water Polo League

== Water Skiing & Wakeboarding ==
- July 25 – 30: 2022 World Wakeboard Championships in (Italy) Rieti

== Weightlifting ==
- TBC: 2022 World Weightlifting Championships in (China) Chongqing
