= 2018 in sports by month =

== Calendar by month ==
=== January ===
Date	Sport	Venue/Event	Status	Winner/s
14 December 2017–1	Darts	(England) 2018 PDC World Darts Championship	International	(England) Rob Cross
1	Ice hockey	(United States) 2018 NHL Winter Classic	Domestic	(New York (state)) New York Rangers
26 December 2017–5	Ice hockey	(United States) 2018 World Junior Ice Hockey Championships	International	Canada
5–7	Speed skating	(Russia) 2018 European Speed Skating Championships	Continental	Netherlands
29 December 2017–6	Ski jumping	(Germany) / (Austria) 2017–18 Four Hills Tournament	International	(Poland) Kamil Stoch
30 December 2017–6	Tennis	(Australia) 2018 Hopman Cup	International	Switzerland (Belinda Bencic & Roger Federer)
6–12	Ice hockey	(Poland) 2018 IIHF World Women's U18 Championship Division I – Group B	International	Denmark was promoted to Division I – Group A Australia was relegated to Division I – Group B Qualification
6–13	Ice hockey	(Russia) 2018 IIHF World Women's U18 Championship	International	United States
6–14	Darts	(England) 2018 BDO World Darts Championship	International	Men: (England) Glen Durrant; Women: (England) Lisa Ashton
6–14	Rugby sevens	(Uruguay) / (Chile) 2018 Sudamérica Rugby Sevens	Continental	South Africa Academy (invitational team)
6–20	Rally raid	(Peru) / (Bolivia) / (Argentina) 2018 Dakar Rally	International	Cars: (Spain) Carlos Sainz ( (France) Team Peugeot Total); Bikes: (Austria) Matthias Walkner ( (Austria) Red Bull KTM Factory Racing); Quads: (Chile) Ignacio Casale ( (Chile) Casale Racing); Trucks: (Russia) Eduard Nikolaev ( (Russia) Kamaz); UTV: (Brazil) Reinaldo Varela (South Racing Can-Am)
30 December 2017–7	Cross-country skiing	(Switzerland) / (Germany) / (Italy) 2017–18 Tour de Ski	International	Men: (Switzerland) Dario Cologna; Women: (Norway) Heidi Weng
8	American football	(United States) 2018 College Football Playoff National Championship	Domestic	Alabama Crimson Tide
8–14	Ice hockey	(Italy) 2018 IIHF World Women's U18 Championship Division I – Group A	International	Japan was promoted to Top Division; Norway was relegated to Division I – Group B
8–20	Cricket	(Pakistan) / (United Arab Emirates) 2018 Blind Cricket World Cup	International	India
9–27	Association football	(China) 2018 AFC U-23 Championship	Continental	Uzbekistan
10–16	Ice hockey	(Serbia) 2018 World Junior Ice Hockey Championships Division II – Group B	International	Spain was promoted to Division II – Group A Turkey was relegated to Division III
11–14	Bandy	(China) 2018 Women's Bandy World Championship	International	Sweden
11–14	Curling	(Canada) 2018 Continental Cup of Curling	International	(Canada) / (United States) Team North America
11–28	Bowls	(England) 2018 World Indoor Bowls Championship	International	Open: (England) Mark Dawes; Women: (England) Katherine Rednall
12–14	Golf	(Malaysia) 2018 EurAsia Cup	International	Europe
12–14	Indoor field hockey	(Belgium) 2018 Men's EuroHockey Indoor Nations Championship	Continental	Austria
12–14	Speed skating	(Germany) 2018 European Short Track Speed Skating Championships	Continental	Men: (Netherlands) Sjinkie Knegt; Women: (Italy) Arianna Fontana
12–28	Handball	(Croatia) 2018 European Men's Handball Championship	Continental	Spain
13	Formula E	(Morocco) 2018 Marrakesh ePrix (FE #3)	International	(Sweden) Felix Rosenqvist ( (India) Mahindra Racing)
13–31	Association football	(Ecuador) 2018 South American Under-20 Women's Football Championship	Continental	Brazil
13–3 February	Cricket	(New Zealand) 2018 Under-19 Cricket World Cup	International	India
13–4 February	Association football	(Morocco) 2018 African Nations Championship	Continental	Morocco
14–21	Snooker	(England) 2018 Masters (Triple Crown #2)	International	(Northern Ireland) Mark Allen
15–21	Figure skating	(Russia) 2018 European Figure Skating Championships	Continental	Men: (Spain) Javier Fernández; Ladies: Alina Zagitova; Pairs: Russia (Evgenia Tarasova & Vladimir Morozov); Ice dance: France (Gabriella Papadakis & Guillaume Cizeron)
15–28	Tennis	(Australia) 2018 Australian Open (Grand Slam #1)	International	Men: (Switzerland) Roger Federer; Women: (Denmark) Caroline Wozniacki
17–27	Handball	(Gabon) 2018 African Men's Handball Championship	Continental	Tunisia
18–28	Association football	(Trinidad and Tobago) 2018 CONCACAF Women's U-20 Championship	Continental	Mexico
18–28	Handball	(South Korea) 2018 Asian Men's Handball Championship	Continental	Qatar
19–21	Indoor field hockey	(Czech Republic) 2018 Women's EuroHockey Indoor Nations Championship	Continental	Germany
19–21	Ski jumping	(Germany) FIS Ski Flying World Championships 2018	International	Individual: Daniel-André Tande; Team: Norway
19–25	Surfing	(China) 2018 ISA World Longboard Surfing Championship	International	Men's open: (Hawaii) Kai Sallas; Women's open: Tory Gilkerson; Aloha Cup: United States; Team points: United States
20–21	Luge	(Germany) 2018 Junior European Luge Championships	Continental	Germany
20–28	Netball	(England) / (South Africa) 2018 Netball Quad Series (January)	International	Australia
22–27	Figure skating	(Chinese Taipei) 2018 Four Continents Figure Skating Championships	International	Men: (China) Jin Boyang; Ladies: (Japan) Kaori Sakamoto; Pairs: United States (Tarah Kayne & Danny O'Shea); Ice dance: United States (Kaitlin Hawayek & Jean-Luc Baker)
22–28	Biathlon	(Italy) 2018 IBU Open European Championships	Continental	France
22–28	Ice hockey	(Bulgaria) 2018 World Junior Ice Hockey Championships Division III	International	Israel was promoted to Division II – Group B New Zealand was relegated to Division III Qualification
25–28	Bobsleigh & Skeleton	(Switzerland) 2018 IBSF Junior & U23 World Championships	International	Germany
25–28	Multi-sport	(United States) Winter X Games XXII	International	United States
25–28	Rallying	(Monaco) 2018 Monte Carlo Rally (WRC #1)	International	(France) Sébastien Ogier & Julien Ingrassia ( (United Kingdom) M-Sport)
25–20 October	Rallying	(European Union) 2018 FIA R-GT Cup	Continental	France (Raphaël Astier & Frédéric Vauclaire)
26–28	Darts	(England) 2018 Masters	International	(Netherlands) Michael van Gerwen
26–28	Rugby sevens	(Australia) 2018 Sydney Sevens (WRSS #3) (Australia) 2018 Sydney Women's Sevens (WRWSS #2)	International	Men: Australia; Women: Australia
27	Horse racing	(United States) 2018 Pegasus World Cup	International	Horse: (United States) Gun Runner; Jockey: (France) Florent Geroux; Trainer: (United States) Steve Asmussen
27–28	Ice hockey	(United States) 63rd National Hockey League All-Star Game	Domestic	Pacific Division (NHL); MVP: (Minnesota) Brock Boeser ( (British Columbia) Vancouver Canucks)
27–28	Luge	(Latvia) FIL European Luge Championships 2018	Continental	Russia
27–4 February	Nordic skiing	(Switzerland) 2018 Nordic Junior World Ski Championships	International	Norway
27–3 March	Rugby union	(Argentina) / (Brazil) / (Canada) / (Chile) / (United States) / (Uruguay) 2018 Americas Rugby Championship	Continental	United States
28	American football	(United States) 2018 Pro Bowl	Domestic	American Football Conference (AFC); Offensive MVP: (California) Delanie Walker ( Tennessee Titans); Defensive MVP: (Texas) Von Miller ( (Colorado) Denver Broncos)
28–4 February	Bandy	(Russia) / (China) 2018 Bandy World Championship	International	Division A: Russia; Division B: Netherlands
30–4 February	Biathlon	(Slovenia) 2018 IBU Junior Open European Championships	Continental	Russia
30–4 February	Ice hockey	(Mexico) 2018 IIHF World Women's U18 Championship Division I – Group B Qualification	International	Netherlands was promoted to Division I – Group B
30–8 February	Alpine skiing	(Switzerland) World Junior Alpine Skiing Championships 2018	International	Switzerland
30–10 February	Futsal	(Slovenia) UEFA Futsal Euro 2018	Continental	Portugal

=== February ===
Date	Sport	Venue/Event	Status	Winner/s
1–3	Athletics	(Iran) 2018 Asian Indoor Athletics Championships	Continental	Kazakhstan
1–4	Roller derby	(England) 2018 Roller Derby World Cup	International	United States
1–11	Futsal	(Chinese Taipei) 2018 AFC Futsal Championship	Continental	Iran
2–3	Luge	(Germany) 2018 Junior World Luge Championships	International	Germany
2–3	Motorsport	(Saudi Arabia) 2018 Race of Champions	International	Race of Champions: (United Kingdom) David Coulthard; Nations' Cup: Germany (Timo Bernhard & René Rast)
2–8	Baseball	(Mexico) 2018 Caribbean Series	Regional	(Puerto Rico) Criollos de Caguas
2–18 March	Rugby union	(England) / (France) / (Ireland) / (Italy) / (Scotland) / (Wales) 2018 Women's Six Nations Championship	Continental	France
3	Formula E	(Chile) 2018 Santiago ePrix (FE #4)	International	(France) Jean-Éric Vergne ( (China) Techeetah)
3–4	Cyclo-cross	(Netherlands) 2018 UCI Cyclo-cross World Championships	International	Men: (Belgium) Wout van Aert; Women: (Belgium) Sanne Cant
3–4	Rugby sevens	2018 New Zealand Sevens (WRSS #4)	International	Fiji
3–4	Table tennis	(Switzerland) 2018 Europe Top 16 Cup	Continental	Men: (Germany) Timo Boll; Women: (Romania) Bernadette Szőcs
3–17 March	Rugby union	(England) / (France) / (Ireland) / (Italy) / (Scotland) / (Wales) 2018 Six Nations Championship	Continental	Ireland
4	American football	(United States) Super Bowl LII	Domestic	(Pennsylvania) Philadelphia Eagles
5–7	Ice hockey	(South Africa) 2018 World Junior Ice Hockey Championships Division III Qualification	International	South Africa was promoted to Division III
6–11	Badminton	(Malaysia) 2018 Badminton Asia Team Championships	Continental	Men: Indonesia; Women: Japan
6–11	Badminton	(New Zealand) 2018 Oceania Badminton Championships	Continental	Men: (New Zealand) Abhinav Manota; Women: (Australia) Chen Hsuan-yu
7–11	Amateur wrestling	(Nigeria) 2018 African Wrestling Championships	Continental	Freestyle: Nigeria; Greco-Roman: Egypt; Women's freestyle: Nigeria
7–11	Indoor field hockey	(Germany) 2018 Men's Indoor Hockey World Cup (Germany) 2018 Women's Indoor Hockey World Cup	International	Men: Austria; Women: Germany
8–20	Cycling	(Myanmar) / (Malaysia) 2018 Asian Road and Track Cycling Championships	Continental	Road: Japan; Track: Japan
9–25	Multi-sport	(South Korea) 2018 Winter Olympics	International	Norway
10–18 March	Rugby union	(Belgium) / (Georgia (country)) / (Germany) / (Romania) / (Russia) / (Spain) 2018 Rugby Europe Championship	Continental	Georgia
11	Triathlon	(South Africa) 2018 ITU Triathlon World Cup #1	International	Men: (South Africa) Richard Murray; Women: (United Kingdom) Vicky Holland
12–15	Badminton	(Algeria) 2018 All Africa Team Badminton Championships	Continental	Men: Algeria; Women: Mauritius
13–18	Badminton	(Russia) 2018 European Team Badminton Championships	Continental	Men: Denmark; Women: Denmark
14–19	Archery	(United States) 2018 World Indoor Archery Championships	International	United States
14–21	Association football	(Argentina) / (Brazil) 2018 Recopa Sudamericana	Continental	(Brazil) Grêmio
15–18	Badminton	(Trinidad and Tobago) 2018 Pan Am Badminton Championships (Team Event)	Continental	Men: Canada; Women: Canada
15–18	Rallying	2018 Rally Sweden (WRC #2)	International	(Belgium) Thierry Neuville & Nicolas Gilsoul ( (South Korea) Hyundai)
16	Rugby league	(Australia) 2018 World Club Challenge	International	(Australia) Melbourne Storm
16–18	Badminton	(Algeria) 2018 African Badminton Championships	Continental	Men: (Mauritius) Georges Paul; Women: (Mauritius) Kate Foo Kune
16–26	Shooting sport	(Hungary) 2018 10m European Shooting Championships	Continental	Russia
16–27 October	Rallying	(European Union) / (Russia) / (United Arab Emirates) / (Qatar) / (Kazakhstan) / (Morocco) 2018 FIA World Cup for Cross-Country Rallies	International	(Poland) Jakub Przygoński (driver) & (Belgium) Tom Colsoul (co-driver)
16–16 November	NASCAR	(United States) 2018 NASCAR Camping World Truck Series	Domestic	(Iowa) Brett Moffitt ( (North Carolina) Hattori Racing Enterprises)
16–17 November	Rallying	(European Union) 2018 European Rally Trophy	Continental	Overall: Portugal (Alexandre Camacho & Rui Rodrigues); For detailed results on various rallies, click here.
17–4 August	Rugby union	(Argentina) / (Australia) / (Japan) / (New Zealand) / (South Africa) 2018 Super Rugby season	International	(New Zealand) Crusaders
17–17 November	NASCAR	(United States) 2018 NASCAR Xfinity Series	Domestic	(California) Tyler Reddick ( (North Carolina) JR Motorsports)
18	NASCAR	(United States) 2018 Daytona 500	Domestic	(North Carolina) Austin Dillon ( (North Carolina) Richard Childress Racing)
18	Basketball	(United States) 2018 NBA All-Star Game	Domestic	All-Star Game: Team LeBron; MVP: (Ohio) LeBron James ( (Ohio) Cleveland Cavaliers)
18–18 November	NASCAR	(United States) 2018 Monster Energy NASCAR Cup Series	Domestic	(Connecticut) Joey Logano ( (North Carolina) Team Penske)
19–25	Snooker	(England) 2018 World Grand Prix	International	(England) Ronnie O'Sullivan
21–25	Ski orienteering	(Estonia) 2018 World University Ski Orienteering Championship	International	Norway
22–25	Table tennis	(England) 2018 ITTF Team World Cup	International	Men: China; Women: China
23–7 October	Rallying	(Ivory Coast) / (Kenya) / (South Africa) / (Zambia) / (Uganda) / (Tanzania) / (Rwanda) 2018 African Rally Championship	Continental	(Kenya) Manvir Baryan (driver) & (United Kingdom) Drew Sturrock (co-driver)
24	Association football	(Morocco) 2018 CAF Super Cup	Continental	(Morocco) Wydad Casablanca
25	Marathon	(Japan) 2018 Tokyo Marathon (WMM #1)	International	Men: (Kenya) Dickson Chumba; Women: (Ethiopia) Birhane Dibaba
25–28	Ice hockey	(Bosnia and Herzegovina) 2018 IIHF World Championship Division III – Qualification	International	Turkmenistan was promoted to Division III
26–4 March	Biathlon	(Estonia) 2018 IBU Youth/Junior World Championships	International	Russia
27–4 March	Amateur wrestling	(Kyrgyzstan) 2018 Asian Wrestling Championships	Continental	Men's freestyle: Uzbekistan; Men's Greco-Roman: Kyrgyzstan; Women's freestyle: China
28–4 March	Track cycling	(Netherlands) 2018 UCI Track Cycling World Championships	International	Netherlands

=== March ===
Date	Sport	Venue/Event	Status	Winner/s
1–4	Golf	2018 WGC-Mexico Championship	International	(United States) Phil Mickelson
1–4	Athletics	(United Kingdom) 2018 IAAF World Indoor Championships	International	United States
2	Triathlon	(United Arab Emirates) 2018 ITU World Triathlon Series #1	International	Men: (South Africa) Henri Schoeman; Women: (Netherlands) Rachel Klamer
2–4	Short track speed skating	(Poland) 2018 World Junior Short Track Speed Skating Championships	International	South Korea
2–4	Pool	(Gibraltar) 2018 World Pool Masters	International	(Netherlands) Niels Feijen
2–4	Rugby sevens	(United States) 2018 USA Sevens (WRSS #5)	International	United States
3	Formula E	2018 Mexico City ePrix (FE #5)	International	(Germany) Daniel Abt ( (Germany) Abt Sportsline)
3–4	Speed skating	(China) 2018 World Sprint Speed Skating Championships	International	Men: (Norway) Håvard Lorentzen; Women: (Netherlands) Jorien ter Mors
3–10	Beach soccer	(Peru) 2018 Copa América de Beach Soccer	Continental	Brazil
3–10	Curling	(Scotland) 2018 World Junior Curling Championships	International	Men: Canada (Skip: Tyler Tardi); Women: Canada (Skip: Kaitlyn Jones)
3–25 November	Motorsport	(Australia) / (New Zealand) 2018 Supercars Championship	Regional	(New Zealand) Scott McLaughlin ( (Australia) DJR Team Penske)
4–25 March	Cricket	(Zimbabwe) 2018 Cricket World Cup Qualifier	International	Afghanistan
5–11	Figure skating	(Bulgaria) 2018 World Junior Figure Skating Championships	International	Men: Alexey Erokhov; Ladies: Alexandra Trusova; Pairs: Russia (Daria Pavliuchenko & Denis Khodykin); Ice dance: Russia (Anastasia Skoptsova & Kirill Aleshin)
5–18	Tennis	(United States) 2018 Indian Wells Masters	International	Men: (Argentina) Juan Martín del Potro; Women: (Japan) Naomi Osaka
7–25	Association football	(Argentina) 2018 South American Under-17 Women's Football Championship	Continental	Brazil
8–11	Rallying	2018 Rally Mexico (WRC #3)	International	(France) Sébastien Ogier & Julien Ingrassia ( (United Kingdom) M-Sport Ford WRT)
8–11	Table tennis	(Belarus) 2018 European Under-21 Table Tennis Championships	Continental	Men: (Czech Republic) Tomáš Polanský; Women: (Russia) Mariia Tailakova
8–25 November	Rallying	(Mexico) / (Canada) / (Venezuela) 2018 NACAM Rally Championship	Regional	(Mexico) Ricardo Triviño (driver) & (Spain) Marc Martí (co-driver)
9–11	Speed skating	(Netherlands) 2018 World Allround Speed Skating Championships	International	Men: (Netherlands) Patrick Roest; Women: (Japan) Miho Takagi
9–11	Speed skating	(United States) 2018 World Junior Speed Skating Championships	International	Men: (Norway) Allan Dahl Johansson; Women: (Netherlands) Joy Beune
9–18	Multi-sport	(South Korea) 2018 Winter Paralympics	International	United States
9–18	Ski jumping	(Norway) Raw Air 2018	International	(Poland) Kamil Stoch
10	Triathlon	(Australia) 2018 ITU Triathlon World Cup #2	International	Men: (South Africa) Richard Murray; Women: (Australia) Emma Jeffcoat
10–11	Rugby sevens	2018 Canada Sevens (WRSS #6)	International	Fiji
10–11	Athletics	(Portugal) 2018 European Throwing Cup	Continental	Germany
10–28	Chess	(Germany) Candidates Tournament 2018	International	(United States) Fabiano Caruana
11–16 September	IndyCar	(United States) / (Canada) 2018 IndyCar Series	International	(New Zealand) Scott Dixon ( (United States) Chip Ganassi Racing)
11–20 December	Surfing	(Australia) / (Brazil) / (Indonesia) / (South Africa) / (French Polynesia) / (United States) / (France) / (Portugal) / (Hawaii) 2018 World Surf League	International	Men: (Brazil) Gabriel Medina; Women: (Australia) Stephanie Gilmore
13–2 April	Basketball	(United States) 2018 NCAA Division I men's basketball tournament	Domestic	(Pennsylvania) Villanova Wildcats; MOP: (Delaware) Donte DiVincenzo (Villanova)
14–18	Shooting sport	(Malaysia) 2018 World University Shooting Championship	International	Italy
15–19	Table tennis	(Australia) 2018 Oceania Table Tennis Championships	Continental	Men: (Australia) Chris Yan; Women: (Australia) Jian Fang Lay
15–25 November	Rallying	(Paraguay) / (Argentina) / (Brazil) / (Bolivia) / (Uruguay) 2018 Codasur South American Rally Championship	Continental	(Paraguay) Gustavo Saba (driver) & (Argentina) Fernando Mussano (co-driver)
16–17	Synchronized skating	(Croatia) 2018 ISU World Junior Synchronized Skating Championships	International	(Russia) Spartak-Junost
16–18	Speed skating	(Canada) 2018 World Short Track Speed Skating Championships	International	Men: (Canada) Charles Hamelin; Women: (South Korea) Choi Min-jeong
16–29	Chess	(Georgia (country)) 2018 European Individual Chess Championship	Continental	(Croatia) Ivan Šarić
16–1 April	Basketball	(United States) 2018 NCAA Division I women's basketball tournament	Domestic	(Indiana) Notre Dame Fighting Irish; MOP: (Wisconsin) Arike Ogunbowale (Notre Dame)
17	Formula E	(Uruguay) 2018 Punta del Este ePrix (FE #6)	International	(France) Jean-Éric Vergne ( (China) Techeetah)
17	Road bicycle racing	(Italy) 2018 Milan–San Remo (Monument #1)	International	(Italy) Vincenzo Nibali ( Bahrain–Merida)
17–18	Freestyle wrestling	(Japan) 2018 Wrestling World Cup - Women's freestyle	International	Japan
17–23	Ice hockey	(Spain) 2018 IIHF Women's World Championship Division II – Group B	International	Spain was promoted to Division II – Group A Romania was relegated to Division III
17–25	Curling	(Canada) 2018 Ford World Women's Curling Championship	International	Canada (Skip: Jennifer Jones)
18	Motorcycle racing	2018 Qatar motorcycle Grand Prix	International	MotoGP: (Italy) Andrea Dovizioso ( (Italy) Ducati Team); Moto2: (Italy) Francesco Bagnaia ( (Italy) Sky Racing Team VR46); Moto3: (Spain) Jorge Martín ( (Italy) Del Conca Gresini Moto3)
19–25	Figure skating	(Italy) 2018 World Figure Skating Championships	International	Men: (United States) Nathan Chen; Ladies: (Canada) Kaetlyn Osmond; Pairs: Germany (Aliona Savchenko & Bruno Massot); Ice dance: France (Gabriella Papadakis & Guillaume Cizeron)
19–25	Snooker	(Wales) 2018 Players Championship	International	(England) Ronnie O'Sullivan
19–1 April	Tennis	(United States) 2018 Miami Open	International	Men: (United States) John Isner; Women: (United States) Sloane Stephens
21–25	Golf	(United States) 2018 WGC-Dell Technologies Match Play	International	(United States) Bubba Watson
21–25	Handball	(Brazil) 2018 Pan American Women's Junior Handball Championship	Continental	Brazil
22–24	Water polo	(Spain) 2018 LEN Women's Europa Cup – Super Final	Continental	Greece
22–25	Speed skating	(Belarus) 2018 World University Speed Skating Championship	International	Japan
22–14 October	Rallying	(European Union) 2018 European Rally Championship	Continental	(Russia) Aleksey Lukyanuk & Alexey Arnautov ( (Russia) Russian Performance Motorsport)
24	Athletics	(Spain) 2018 IAAF World Half Marathon Championships	International	Men: (Kenya) Geoffrey Kamworor; Women: (Ethiopia) Netsanet Gudeta
24–30	Ice hockey	(Croatia) 2018 IIHF World U18 Championships Division II – Group B	International	Spain was promoted to Division II – Group A Iceland was relegated to Division III – Group A
25	Formula One	(Australia) 2018 Australian Grand Prix	International	(Germany) Sebastian Vettel ( (Italy) Ferrari)
25	Triathlon	(New Zealand) 2018 ITU Triathlon World Cup #3	International	Men: (Australia) Declan Wilson; Women: (United States) Kirsten Kasper
26–1 April	Weightlifting	(Romania) 2018 European Weightlifting Championships	Continental	Georgia
26–1 April	Ice hockey	(Turkey) 2018 IIHF World U18 Championships Division III – Group A	International	Belgium was promoted to Division II – Group B Chinese Taipei was relegated to Division III – Group B
29–30 September	Baseball	(United States) / (Canada) 2018 Major League Baseball season	Domestic	AL 2018 Season: (Massachusetts) Boston Red Sox; NL 2018 Season: (Wisconsin) Milwaukee Brewers
29–2 April	Golf	(United States) 2018 ANA Inspiration	International	(Sweden) Pernilla Lindberg
31	Horse racing	(United Arab Emirates) 2018 Dubai World Cup	International	Horse: (Republic of Ireland) Thunder Snow; Jockey: (Belgium) Christophe Soumillon; Trainer: (United Arab Emirates) Saeed bin Suroor
31	Professional boxing	(United Kingdom) Anthony Joshua vs. Joseph Parker	International	(United Kingdom) Anthony Joshua
31–6 April	Ice hockey	(Slovenia) 2018 IIHF Women's World Championship Division II – Group A	International	Netherlands was promoted to Division I – Group B Mexico was relegated to Division II – Group B
31–8 April	Curling	(United States) 2018 World Men's Curling Championship	International	Sweden (Skip: Niklas Edin)

=== April ===
Date	Sport	Venue/Event	Status	Winner/s
1	Road bicycle racing	(Belgium) 2018 Tour of Flanders (Monument #2)	International	(Netherlands) Niki Terpstra ( (Belgium) Quick-Step Floors)
1–7	Ice hockey	(Estonia) 2018 IIHF World U18 Championships Division II – Group A	International	Great Britain was promoted to Division I – Group B Australia was relegated to Division II – Group B
1–9	Fencing	(Italy) 2018 Junior World Fencing Championships	International	Russia
2–8	Basketball	(China) 2018 FIBA Under-16 Asian Championship	Continental	Australia
2–8	Ice hockey	(Latvia) 2018 IIHF World U18 Championships Division I – Group A	International	Latvia was promoted to Top Division; Slovenia was relegated to Division I – Group B
2–8	Snooker	2018 China Open	International	(England) Mark Selby
3–8	Handball	(Mexico) 2018 Nor.Ca. Men's Handball Championship	Continental	Cuba
3–8	Ice hockey	(Philippines) 2018 IIHF Challenge Cup of Asia — Top Division	Continental	Mongolia
4–15	Multi-sport	(Australia) 2018 Commonwealth Games	International	Australia
4–22	Association football	(Chile) 2018 Copa América Femenina	Continental	Brazil
5–8	Golf	(United States) 2018 Masters Tournament	International	(United States) Patrick Reed
5–8	Rallying	(France) 2018 Tour de Corse (WRC #4)	International	(France) Sébastien Ogier & Julien Ingrassia ( (United Kingdom) M-Sport Ford WRT)
5–8	Water polo	(Croatia) 2018 LEN Men's Europa Cup – Super Final	Continental	Croatia
6–7	Synchronized skating	(Sweden) 2018 ISU World Synchronized Skating Championships	International	(Finland) Marigold IceUnity
6–8	Judo	(France) / (New Caledonia) 2018 Oceania Judo Championships	Continental	Australia
6–8	Rugby sevens	2018 Hong Kong Sevens (WRSS #7)	International	Fiji
6–8	Table tennis	(Japan) 2018 ITTF-ATTU Asian Cup	Continental	Men: (China) Fan Zhendong; Women: (China) Zhu Yuling
6–16	Ultramarathon	(Morocco) 2018 Marathon des Sables	International	Men: (Morocco) Rachid El Morabity; Women: (United States) Magdalena Boulet
6–20	Association football	(Jordan) 2018 AFC Women's Asian Cup	Continental	Japan
7	Athletics	(Switzerland) 2018 World University Cross Country Championships	International	Men: (Algeria) El Hocine Zourkane; Women: (Germany) Caterina Granz
7–8	Freestyle wrestling	(United States) 2018 Wrestling World Cup - Men's freestyle	International	United States
7–15	Volleyball	(Czech Republic) / (Slovakia) 2018 Boys' U18 Volleyball European Championship	Continental	Germany
7–16	Modern pentathlon	(Portugal) 2018 World Youth A Modern Pentathlon Championships	International	Men: (Egypt) Ahmed El-Gendy; Women: (Italy) Alice Rinaudo
7–20	Chess	(Slovakia) 2018 European Women's Chess Championship	Continental	(Russia) Valentina Gunina
7–25 November	Motorsport	(Council of Europe) / (Bahrain) / (United Arab Emirates) 2018 FIA Formula 2 Championship	International	(United Kingdom) George Russell ( (France) ART Grand Prix)
4 October 2017–8	Ice hockey	(United States) / (Canada) 2017–18 NHL season	Domestic	Presidents' Trophy: (Tennessee) Nashville Predators; Art Ross Trophy: (Ontario) Connor McDavid ( (Alberta) Edmonton Oilers)
8	Formula One	2018 Bahrain Grand Prix	International	(Germany) Sebastian Vettel ( (Italy) Ferrari)
8	Motorcycle racing	(Argentina) 2018 Argentine motorcycle Grand Prix	International	MotoGP: (United Kingdom) Cal Crutchlow ( (Monaco) LCR Honda); Moto2: (Italy) Mattia Pasini ( (Italy) Italtrans Racing Team); Moto3: (Italy) Marco Bezzecchi ( (Germany) Redox PrüstelGP)
8	Road bicycle racing	(France) 2018 Paris–Roubaix (Monument #3)	International	(Slovakia) Peter Sagan ( (Germany) Bora–Hansgrohe)
8–14	Ice hockey	(France) 2018 IIHF Women's World Championship Division I – Group A	International	France was promoted to Top Division; Slovakia was relegated to Division I – Group B
8–14	Ice hockey	(Italy) 2018 IIHF Women's World Championship Division I – Group B	International	Italy was promoted to Division I – Group A Poland was relegated to Division II – Group A
8–18 November	Motorsport	(European Union) / (Morocco) / (Argentina) / (China) / (Japan) / (Macau) 2018 World Touring Car Cup	International	(Italy) Gabriele Tarquini ( (Italy) BRC Racing Team)
10–14	Handball	(Argentina) 2018 Pan American Women's Youth Handball Championship	Continental	Brazil
10–15	Equestrianism	(France) 2018 FEI World Cup Show Jumping and Dressage Finals	International	Show Jumping: (United States) Beezie Madden; Dressage: (Germany) Isabell Werth
17 October 2017–11	Basketball	(United States) / (Canada) 2017–18 NBA season	Domestic	Top Seed: (Texas) Houston Rockets; Top Scorer: (California) James Harden (Houston Rockets)
12	Basketball	(United States) 2018 WNBA draft	International	#1: A'ja Wilson (to the (Nevada) Las Vegas Aces from the South Carolina Gamecocks)
12–15	Judo	(Tunisia) 2018 African Judo Championships	Continental	Tunisia
12–15	Trampolining	(Azerbaijan) 2018 European Trampoline Championships	Continental	Russia
13–15	Acrobatic gymnastics	(Belgium) 2018 Acrobatic Gymnastics World Championships	International	Russia
13–21	Volleyball	(Bulgaria) 2018 Girls' U17 Volleyball European Championship	Continental	Russia
14	Formula E	(Italy) 2018 Rome ePrix (FE #7)	International	(United Kingdom) Sam Bird ( (United Kingdom) DS Virgin Racing)
14	Horse racing	(United Kingdom) 2018 Grand National	International	Horse: (Republic of Ireland) Tiger Roll; Jockey: (Republic of Ireland) Davy Russell; Trainer: (Republic of Ireland) Gordon Elliott
14–20	Ice hockey	(Ukraine) 2018 IIHF World U18 Championships Division I – Group B	International	Ukraine was promoted to Division I – Group A Romania was relegated to Division II – Group A
14–20	Ice hockey	(Spain) 2018 IIHF World Championship Division II – Group B	International	Spain was promoted to Division II – Group A Luxembourg was relegated to Division III
14–21 October	Motorsport	(European Union) 2018 International GT Open	International	Overall: (Denmark) Mikkel Mac; Pro AM: (United Kingdom) Tom Onslow-Cole; AM: (Poland) Andrzej Lewandowski
14–24 November	Motorsport	(Council of Europe) / (Canada) / (United States) / (South Africa) 2018 FIA World Rallycross Championship	International	Johan Kristoffersson ( Volkswagen RX Sweden)
15	Formula One	(China) 2018 Chinese Grand Prix	International	(Australia) Daniel Ricciardo ( (Austria) Red Bull Racing)
15–19	Fencing	(Armenia) 2018 European Fencing Under 23 Championships	Continental	Italy
15–22	Tennis	(Monaco) 2018 Monte-Carlo Masters	International	(Spain) Rafael Nadal
15–28 October	Motorsport	(European Union) 2018 European Le Mans Series	International	LMP2: (France) Andrea Pizzitola & (Russia) Roman Rusinov; LMP3: (Netherlands) Job van Uitert, (Canada) John Farano, & (United Kingdom) Rob Garofall; LMGTE: (Italy) Gianluca Roda & (Italy) Giorgio Roda
16	Marathon	(United States) 2018 Boston Marathon (WMM #2)	International	Men: (Japan) Yuki Kawauchi; Women: (United States) Desiree Linden
16–22	Ice hockey	(South Africa) 2018 IIHF World Championship Division III	International	Georgia was promoted to Division II – Group B Hong Kong was relegated to Division III – Qualification
19–29	Ice hockey	(Russia) 2018 IIHF World U18 Championships	International	Finland
20–22	Judo	(Costa Rica) 2018 Pan American Judo Championships	Continental	Cuba
21–22	Rugby sevens	2018 Japan Women's Sevens (WRWSS #3)	International	New Zealand
21–28	Curling	(Sweden) 2018 World Mixed Doubles Curling Championship (Sweden) 2018 World Senior Curling Championships	International	Mixed Doubles: Switzerland (Michèle Jäggi & Sven Michel); Senior Men: Canada (Skip: Wade White); Senior Women: Canada (Skip: Sherry Anderson)
21–7 May	Snooker	(England) 2018 World Snooker Championship (Triple Crown #3)	International	(Wales) Mark Williams
22	Marathon	(United Kingdom) 2018 London Marathon (WMM #3)	International	Men: (Kenya) Eliud Kipchoge; Women: (Kenya) Vivian Cheruiyot
22	Motorcycle racing	(United States) 2018 Motorcycle Grand Prix of the Americas	International	MotoGP: (Spain) Marc Márquez ( (Japan) Repsol Honda Team); Moto2: (Italy) Francesco Bagnaia ( (Italy) Sky Racing Team VR46); Moto3: (Spain) Jorge Martín ( (Italy) Del Conca Gresini Moto3)
22	Road bicycle racing	(Belgium) 2018 Liège–Bastogne–Liège (Monument #4)	International	(Luxembourg) Bob Jungels ( (Belgium) Quick-Step Floors)
22–28	Ice hockey	(Hungary) 2018 IIHF World Championship Division I – Group A	International	Great Britain and Italy were promoted to Top Division; Poland was relegated to Division I – Group B
22–28	Ice hockey	(Lithuania) 2018 IIHF World Championship Division I – Group B	International	Lithuania was promoted to Division I – Group A Croatia was relegated to Division II – Group A
23	Association football	(Switzerland) 2017–18 UEFA Youth League Final	Continental	(Spain) Barcelona
23–29	Ice hockey	(Netherlands) 2018 IIHF World Championship Division II – Group A	International	Netherlands was promoted to Division I – Group B Iceland was relegated to Division II – Group B
24–29	Badminton	(China) 2018 Badminton Asia Championships	Continental	Men: (Japan) Kento Momota; Women: (Chinese Taipei) Tai Tzu-ying
24–29	Badminton	(Spain) 2018 European Badminton Championships	Continental	Men: (Denmark) Viktor Axelsen; Women: (Spain) Carolina Marín
24–5 May	Association football	(Liberia) 2018 WAFU/FOX U-20 Tournament	Regional	Gambia
26–28	Ice hockey	(New Zealand) 2018 IIHF World U18 Championships Division III – Group B	International	New Zealand was promoted to Division III – Group A
26–28	American football	(United States) 2018 NFL draft	Domestic	#1 pick: (Texas) Baker Mayfield (to the (Ohio) Cleveland Browns from the Oklahoma Sooners)
26–28	Judo	(Israel) 2018 European Judo Championships	Continental	Russia
26–29	Badminton	(Guatemala) 2018 Pan Am Badminton Championships	Continental	Men: (Brazil) Ygor Coelho; Women: (Canada) Michelle Li
26–29	Rallying	2018 Rally Argentina (WRC #5)	International	(Estonia) Ott Tänak & Martin Järveoja ( (Japan) Toyota Gazoo Racing WRT)
28	Formula E	(France) 2018 Paris ePrix (FE #8)	International	(France) Jean-Éric Vergne ( (China) Techeetah)
28	Triathlon	(Bermuda) 2018 ITU World Triathlon Series #2	International	Men: (Norway) Casper Stornes; Women: (Bermuda) Flora Duffy
28–29	Rugby sevens	2018 Singapore Sevens (WRSS #8)	International	Fiji
28–1 May	3x3 basketball	(China) 2018 FIBA 3x3 Asia Cup	Continental	Men: Australia; Women: New Zealand
28–2 June	Rugby union	(Hong Kong) / (Malaysia) / (South Korea) 2018 Asia Rugby Championship	Continental	Hong Kong
29	Formula One	2018 Azerbaijan Grand Prix	International	(United Kingdom) Lewis Hamilton ( (Germany) Mercedes)
29–6 May	Table tennis	(Sweden) 2018 World Team Table Tennis Championships	International	Men: China; Women: China
30–6 May	Amateur wrestling	(Russia) 2018 European Wrestling Championships	Continental	Russia

=== May ===
Date	Sport	Venue/Event	Status	Winner/s
2–12	Futsal	(Thailand) 2018 AFC Women's Futsal Championship	Continental	Iran
2–20	Chess	(China) Women's World Chess Championship 2018 (match)	International	(China) Ju Wenjun
3–6	Amateur wrestling	(Peru) 2018 Pan-American Wrestling Championships	Continental	United States
3–17 November	Rallying	(Jordan) / (Cyprus) / (Lebanon) / (Iran) / (Kuwait) / (Qatar) 2018 Middle East Rally Championship	Regional	(Qatar) Nasser Al-Attiyah & (France) Matthieu Baumel ( (United Kingdom) M-Sport)
4	Athletics	Qatar Athletic Super Grand Prix (Diamond League #1)	International	United States
4–6	Basketball	(Greece) 2018 Basketball Champions League Final Four	Continental	(Greece) AEK Athens
4–20	Ice hockey	(Denmark) 2018 IIHF World Championship	International	Sweden
4–20	Association football	(England) 2018 UEFA European Under-17 Championship	Continental	Netherlands
4–27	Road bicycle racing	(Italy) 2018 Giro d'Italia (Grand Tour #1)	International	(United Kingdom) Chris Froome ( (United Kingdom) Team Sky)
5	Horse racing	(United States) 2018 Kentucky Derby	International	Horse: (United States) Justify; Jockey: (United States) Mike Smith; Trainer: (United States) Bob Baffert
5–6	Athletics	(China) 2018 IAAF World Race Walking Team Championships	International	China
5–6	Triathlon	(China) 2018 ITU Triathlon World Cup #5	International	Men: (Azerbaijan) Rostyslav Pevtsov; Women: (Australia) Emma Jeffcoat
5–13	Tennis	(Spain) 2018 Madrid Open	International	Men: (Germany) Alexander Zverev; Women: (Czech Republic) Petra Kvitová
5–2 December	Rallying	(New Zealand) / (Australia) / (Malaysia) / (Japan) / (China) / (India) 2018 Asia-Pacific Rally Championship	Regional	(Japan) Yuya Sumiyama (driver) & (Japan) Takahiro Yasui (co-driver)
5–16 June 2019	Motorsport	(European Union) / (Japan) / (China) / (United States) 2018–19 FIA World Endurance Championship	International	
6	Motorcycle racing	(Spain) 2018 Spanish motorcycle Grand Prix	International	MotoGP: (Spain) Marc Márquez ( (Belgium) Repsol Honda); Moto2: (Italy) Lorenzo Baldassarri ( (United Kingdom) Pons Racing); Moto3: (Germany) Philipp Öttl ( (Germany) Südmetall Schedl GP Racing)
6–21 October	Motorsport	(European Union) 2018 TCR Europe Series	Continental	(Spain) Mikel Azcona ( (Spain) PCR Sport)
9–21	Association football	(Lithuania) 2018 UEFA Women's Under-17 Championship	Continental	Spain
10–13	Taekwondo	(Russia) 2018 European Taekwondo Championships	Continental	Russia
10–13	Karate	(Serbia) 2018 European Karate Championships	Continental	Spain
10–13	Golf	(United States) 2018 Players Championship	International	(United States) Webb Simpson
12	Athletics	(China) Shanghai Golden Grand Prix (Diamond League #2)	International	China
12	Rugby union	(Spain) 2018 European Rugby Champions Cup Final	Continental	(Ireland) Leinster
12	Triathlon	(Japan) 2018 ITU World Triathlon Series #3	International	Men: (Spain) Mario Mola; Women: (Bermuda) Flora Duffy
12–13	Rugby sevens	2018 Canada Women's Sevens (WRWSS #4)	International	New Zealand
12–14 October	Motorsport	(European Union) 2018 FIA Formula 3 European Championship	International	(Germany) Mick Schumacher ( (Italy) Prema Powerteam)
13	Formula One	(Spain) 2018 Spanish Grand Prix	International	(United Kingdom) Lewis Hamilton ( (Germany) Mercedes)
13–20	Field hockey	(South Korea) 2018 Asian Women's Hockey Champions Trophy	Continental	South Korea
14–20	Tennis	(Italy) 2018 Italian Open	International	Men: (Spain) Rafael Nadal; Women: (Ukraine) Elina Svitolina
15–20	Pool	(China) 2018 World Cup of Pool	International	China (Wu Jia-qing & Liu Haitao)
16	Association football	(France) 2018 UEFA Europa League Final	Continental	(Spain) Atlético Madrid
16–19	Golf	(Philippines) 2018 World University Golf Championship	International	Men: (Japan) Daiki Imano; Women: (South Korea) Ma Da-som
17–20	Rallying	2018 Rally de Portugal (WRC #6)	International	(Belgium) Thierry Neuville & Nicolas Gilsoul ( (South Korea) Hyundai Shell Mobis WRT)
17–20	Golf	(United States) The Tradition	International	(Spain) Miguel Ángel Jiménez
18–19	Table tennis	(Vanuatu) 2018 ITTF-Oceania Cup	Continental	Men: (Australia) Hu Heming; Women: (Australia) Jian Fang Lay
18–20	Basketball	(Serbia) 2018 EuroLeague Final Four	Continental	(Spain) Real Madrid
19	Athletics	(United Kingdom) 2018 European 10,000m Cup	Continental	Men: (Germany) Richard Ringer; Women: (Israel) Lonah Chemtai Salpeter
19	Formula E	(Germany) 2018 Berlin ePrix (FE #9)	International	(Germany) Daniel Abt ( (Germany) Abt Sportsline)
19	Horse racing	(United States) 2018 Preakness Stakes	Domestic	Horse: (United States) Justify; Jockey: (United States) Mike Smith; Trainer: (United States) Bob Baffert
19	Triathlon	(Kazakhstan) 2018 ITU Triathlon World Cup #6	International	Men: (Russia) Dmitry Polyanski; Women: (France) Sandra Dodet
20	Motorcycle racing	(France) 2018 French motorcycle Grand Prix	International	MotoGP: (Spain) Marc Márquez ( (Japan) Repsol Honda Team); Moto2: (Italy) Francesco Bagnaia ( (Italy) Sky Racing Team VR46); Moto3: (Spain) Albert Arenas ( (Spain) Ángel Nieto Team Moto3)
20–26	Nine-pin bowling	(Romania) 2018 nine-pin bowling Single's World Championships	International	Single classic: (Serbia) Vilmoš Zavarko (Men), (Germany) Sina Beißer (Women); Sprint: (Serbia) Vilmoš Zavarko (Men), (Croatia) Ines Maričić (Women); Combination: (Serbia) Vilmoš Zavarko (Men), (Serbia) Jasmina Anđelković (Women); Mixed tandem: (Czech Republic) Renáta Navrkalová & Jan Endršt
20–27	Badminton	(Thailand) 2018 Thomas & Uber Cup	International	Thomas Cup: China; Uber Cup: Japan
20–27	Volleyball	(Thailand) 2018 Asian Girls' U17 Volleyball Championship	Continental	Japan
20–29 September	NASCAR	(Canada) 2018 NASCAR Pinty's Series	Domestic	(Quebec) Louis-Philippe Dumoulin ( (United States) Dodge)
24	Association football	(Ukraine) 2018 UEFA Women's Champions League Final	Continental	(France) Lyon
24–27	Golf	(England) 2018 BMW PGA Championship	International	(Italy) Francesco Molinari
24–27	Golf	(United States) Senior PGA Championship	International	(England) Paul Broadhurst
26	Association football	(Ukraine) 2018 UEFA Champions League Final	Continental	(Spain) Real Madrid
26	Athletics	(United States) Prefontaine Classic (Diamond League #3)	International	United States
26	Rugby union	(Republic of Ireland) 2018 Pro14 Grand Final	International	(Ireland) Leinster
26–27	Rowing	(France) 2018 European Rowing Junior Championships	Continental	Czech Republic
26–8 June	Multi-sport event	(Bolivia) 2018 South American Games	Continental	Colombia
26–9 June	Association football	(France) 2018 Toulon Tournament	International	England
26–7 October	Motorsport	(European Union) 2018 European Truck Racing Championship	Continental	(Germany) Jochen Hahn ( (Germany) Team Hahn Racing)
27	Formula One	2018 Monaco Grand Prix	International	(Australia) Daniel Ricciardo ( (Austria) Red Bull Racing)
27	INDYCAR	(United States) 2018 Indianapolis 500	International	(Australia) Will Power ( (United States) Team Penske)
27–9 June	Association football	(South Africa) 2018 COSAFA Cup	Regional	Zimbabwe
27–10 June	Tennis	(France) 2018 French Open (Grand Slam #2)	International	Men: (Spain) Rafael Nadal; Women: (Romania) Simona Halep
28–2 June	Water polo	(China) 2018 FINA Women's Water Polo World League Super Final	International	United States
28–7 June	Ice hockey	(United States) 2018 Stanley Cup Final	Domestic	(Washington, D.C.) Washington Capitals
30–17 June	Rugby union	(France) 2018 World Rugby Under 20 Championship	International	France
31	Athletics	(Italy) Golden Gala (Diamond League #4)	International	United States
31–3 June	Darts	(Germany) 2018 PDC World Cup of Darts	International	Netherlands (Michael van Gerwen & Raymond van Barneveld)
31–3 June	Golf	(United States) 2018 U.S. Women's Open	International	(Thailand) Ariya Jutanugarn
31–8 June	Basketball	(United States) 2018 NBA Finals	Domestic	(California) Golden State Warriors
31–10 June	Association football	2018 ConIFA World Football Cup	International	Kárpátalja

=== June ===
Date	Sport	Venue/Event	Status	Winner/s
1–3	Canoe slalom	(Czech Republic) 2018 European Canoe Slalom Championships	Continental	Germany
1–3	Rhythmic gymnastics	(Spain) 2018 Rhythmic Gymnastics European Championships	Continental	Russia
1–3	Aerobic gymnastics	(Portugal) 2018 Aerobic Gymnastics World Championships	International	Russia
2	Horse racing	(United Kingdom) 2018 Epsom Derby	International	Horse: (Republic of Ireland) Masar; Jockey: (United Kingdom) William Buick; Trainer: (United Kingdom) Charlie Appleby
2	Triathlon	(Italy) 2018 ITU Triathlon World Cup #7	International	Men: (Italy) Delian Stateff; Women: (Austria) Lisa Perterer
2–3	Rugby sevens	(England) 2018 London Sevens (WRSS #9)	International	Fiji
2–9	Motorcycle speedway	(Germany) / (United Kingdom) / (Poland) 2018 Speedway of Nations	International	Russia (Artem Laguta, Emil Sayfutdinov & Gleb Chugunov)
3	Motorcycle racing	(Italy) 2018 Italian motorcycle Grand Prix	International	MotoGP: (Spain) Jorge Lorenzo ( (Italy) Ducati Corse); Moto2: (Portugal) Miguel Oliveira ( (Finland) Ajo Motorsport); Moto3: (Spain) Jorge Martín ( (Italy) Gresini Racing)
3–10	Cricket	(Malaysia) 2018 Women's Twenty20 Asia Cup	Continental	Bangladesh
4–10	Amateur wrestling	(Turkey) 2018 European U23 Wrestling Championship	Continental	Russia
4–10	Diving	(China) 2018 FINA Diving World Cup	International	China
5–9	BMX racing	(Azerbaijan) 2018 UCI BMX World Championships	International	Men: (France) Sylvain André; Women: (Netherlands) Laura Smulders
5–9	Squash	(United Arab Emirates) 2018 Men's PSA World Series Finals (United Arab Emirates) 2018 Women's PSA World Series Finals	International	Men: (Egypt) Mohamed El Shorbagy; Women: (Egypt) Nour El Sherbini
5–9	Fencing	(Tunisia) 2018 African Fencing Championships	Continental	Egypt
5–13	Amateur boxing	(Bulgaria) 2018 Women's European Amateur Boxing Championships	Continental	Russia
6–12	Association football	(United States) 2018 CONCACAF Women's U-17 Championship	Continental	United States
7	Athletics	(Norway) Bislett Games (Diamond League #5)	International	United States
7	Triathlon	(United Kingdom) 2018 ITU World Triathlon Mixed Relay Series #1	International	United States (Kirsten Kasper, Eli Hemming, Katie Zaferes, & Matthew McElroy)
7–9	Water polo	(Italy) 2017–18 LEN Champions League Final Eight	Continental	(Greece) Olympiacos
7–10	Athletics	(Japan) 2018 Asian Junior Athletics Championships	Continental	Japan
7–10	Rallying	(Italy) 2018 Rally Italia Sardegna (WRC #7)	International	(Belgium) Thierry Neuville & Nicolas Gilsoul ( (South Korea) Hyundai Shell Mobis WRT)
8–10	Golf	(United States) 2018 Curtis Cup	International	United States
8–10	Rugby sevens	2018 France Women's Sevens (WRWSS #5)	International	New Zealand
8–10	Canoe sprint	(Serbia) 2018 Canoe Sprint European Championships	Continental	Hungary
8–12	3x3 basketball	(Philippines) 2018 FIBA 3x3 World Cup	International	Men: Serbia; Women: Italy
9	Horse racing	(United States) 2018 Belmont Stakes	Domestic	Horse: (United States) Justify; Jockey: (United States) Mike Smith; Trainer: (United States) Bob Baffert
9–10	Rugby sevens	(France) 2018 Paris Sevens (WRSS #10)	International	South Africa
9–16	Rugby union	(Fiji) 2018 World Rugby Pacific Nations Cup	Regional	Fiji
10	Athletics	(Sweden) Stockholm Bauhaus Athletics (Diamond League #6)	International	Great Britain
10	Formula E	(Switzerland) 2018 Zürich ePrix (FE #10)	International	(Brazil) Lucas di Grassi ( (Germany) Abt Sportsline)
10	Formula One	(Canada) 2018 Canadian Grand Prix	International	(Germany) Sebastian Vettel ( (Italy) Ferrari)
10	Triathlon	(United Kingdom) 2018 ITU World Triathlon Series #4	International	Men: (South Africa) Richard Murray; Women: (United Kingdom) Vicky Holland
10	Triathlon	(Mexico) 2018 ITU Triathlon World Cup #8	International	Men: (Mexico) Rodrigo González; Women: (United States) Chelsea Sodaro
10–16	Basketball	(Canada) 2018 FIBA Under-18 Americas Championship	Continental	United States
10–17	Volleyball	(Vietnam) 2018 Asian Women's U19 Volleyball Championship	Continental	Japan
14–17	Golf	(United States) 2018 U.S. Open	International	(United States) Brooks Koepka
14–24	American football	(China) 2018 World University American Football Championship	International	Mexico
14–15 July	Association football	(Russia) 2018 FIFA World Cup	International	France
15–17	Table tennis	(Paraguay) 2018 ITTF Pan-America Cup	Continental	Men: (Brazil) Hugo Calderano; Women: (Canada) Zhang Mo
15–20	Fencing	(Cuba) 2018 Pan American Fencing Championships	Continental	United States
16–17	Endurance racing	(France) 2018 24 Hours of Le Mans	International	(Switzerland) Sébastien Buemi, (Japan) Kazuki Nakajima, & (Spain) Fernando Alonso ( (Japan) Toyota Motorsport GmbH)
16–21	Fencing	(Serbia) 2018 European Fencing Championships	Continental	Russia
16–24	Handball	(Greenland) 2018 Pan American Men's Handball Championship	Continental	Argentina
16–18 August	Rugby union	(Kenya) / (Morocco) / (Namibia) / (Tunisia) / (Uganda) / (Zimbabwe) 2018 Rugby Africa Gold Cup	Continental	Namibia
17	Motorcycle racing	(Catalonia) 2018 Catalan motorcycle Grand Prix	International	MotoGP: (Spain) Jorge Lorenzo ( (Italy) Ducati Corse); Moto2: (France) Fabio Quartararo ( (Italy) Speed Up); Moto3: (Italy) Enea Bastianini ( (Luxembourg) Leopard Racing)
17	Triathlon	(Belgium) 2018 ITU Triathlon World Cup #9	International	Men: (Belgium) Jelle Geens; Women: (United States) Summer Cook
17–22	Fencing	(Thailand) 2018 Asian Fencing Championships	Continental	South Korea
18–23	Water polo	(Hungary) 2018 FINA Men's Water Polo World League Super Final	International	Montenegro
18–24	Sailing	(Germany) 2018 Men's Laser Radial World Championship	International	(Australia) Zac Littlewood
18–25	Sailing	(Indonesia) 2018 Asian Sailing Championship	Continental	China
20–23	Sport climbing	(Slovakia) 2018 World University Climbing Championships	International	France
20–24	Volleyball	(Portugal) 2018 FIVB Volleyball Men's Challenger Cup (Peru) 2018 FIVB Volleyball Women's Challenger Cup	International	Men: Portugal; Women: Bulgaria
21	Basketball	(United States) 2018 NBA draft	International	#1: (The Bahamas) Deandre Ayton (to the Phoenix Suns from the Arizona Wildcats)
22–1 July	Multi-sport	(Spain) 2018 Mediterranean Games	Regional	Italy
23–1 July	Field hockey	(Netherlands) 2018 Men's Hockey Champions Trophy	International	Australia
24	Formula One	(France) 2018 French Grand Prix	International	(United Kingdom) Lewis Hamilton ( (Germany) Mercedes)
25–30	Swimming	(Papua New Guinea) 2018 Oceania Swimming Championships	Continental	New Zealand
26–30	Floorball	(Poland) 2018 World University Floorball Championship	International	Men: Czech Republic; Women: Finland
26–1 July	Basketball	(San Marino) 2018 FIBA European Championship for Small Countries (Republic of Ireland) 2018 FIBA Women's European Championship for Small Countries	Continental	Men: Malta; Women: Denmark
28–1 July	Golf	(United States) 2018 KPMG Women's PGA Championship	International	(South Korea) Park Sung-hyun
28–1 July	Golf	(United States) U.S. Senior Open	International	(United States) David Toms
28–1 July	Canoe sprint	(Italy) 2018 European Junior & U23 Canoe Sprint Championships	Continental	Junior: Belarus; U23: Belarus & Poland (tie)
29–6 July	Volleyball	(Iran) 2018 Asian Boys' U18 Volleyball Championship	Continental	Japan
14 October 2017–30	Sailing	(Council of Europe) / (South Africa) / (Australia) / (Hong Kong) / (China) / (New Zealand) / (Brazil) / (United States) 2017–18 Volvo Ocean Race	International	Overall: (China) Dongfeng Race Team (Skipper: (France) Charles Caudrelier); In-port series: (Spain) MAPFRE (Skipper: (Spain) Xabi Fernández)
30	Athletics	(France) Meeting de Paris (Diamond League #7)	International	Jamaica
30–8 July	Basketball	(Argentina) 2018 FIBA Under-17 Basketball World Cup	International	United States

=== July ===
Date	Sport	Venue/Event	Status	Winner/s
1	Formula One	(Austria) 2018 Austrian Grand Prix	International	(Netherlands) Max Verstappen ( (Austria) Red Bull Racing)
1	Motorcycle racing	(Netherlands) 2018 Dutch TT	International	MotoGP: (Spain) Marc Márquez ( (Belgium) Repsol Honda); Moto2: (Italy) Francesco Bagnaia ( (Italy) Sky Racing Team by VR46); Moto3: (Spain) Jorge Martín ( (Italy) Gresini Racing)
1–14	Handball	(Hungary) 2018 Women's Junior World Handball Championship	International	Hungary
2–15	Tennis	(United Kingdom) 2018 Wimbledon Championships (Grand Slam #3)	International	Men: (Serbia) Novak Djokovic; Women: (Germany) Angelique Kerber
4–8	Modern pentathlon	(Hungary) 2018 World University Modern Pentathlon Championships	International	Men: (France) Brice Loubet; Women: (Italy) Elena Micheli
4–8	Swimming	(Finland) 2018 European Junior Swimming Championships	Continental	Russia
5	Athletics	(Switzerland) Athletissima (Diamond League #8)	International	United States
5–8	Athletics	(Hungary) 2018 European Athletics U18 Championships	Continental	Great Britain
6–8	Beach soccer	(Portugal) 2018 Women's Euro Beach Soccer Cup	Continental	Russia
6–14	Triathlon	(Denmark) 2018 ITU Multisport World Championships	International	Duathlon: (Denmark) Andreas Schilling / (Austria) Sandrina Illes; Cross triathlon: (Spain) Rubén Ruzafa / (United Kingdom) Lesley Paterson; Aquathlon: (Belgium) Emmanuel Lejeune / (Iceland) Edda Hannesdottir; Long Distance: (Spain) Pablo Dapena Gonzalez / (Denmark) Helle Frederiksen
6–15	Road bicycle racing	(Italy) 2018 Giro Rosa	International	(Netherlands) Annemiek van Vleuten ( (Australia) Mitchelton–Scott)
6–15	Baseball	2018 World University Baseball Championship	International	Japan
7–8	Triathlon	(Hungary) 2018 ITU Triathlon World Cup #10	International	Men: Cancelled; Women: (United Kingdom) Sophie Coldwell
7–14	Weightlifting	(Uzbekistan) 2018 Junior World Weightlifting Championships	International	Medal Tally: Uzbekistan; Men's Team: Iran; Women's Team: United States
7–15	Basketball	(Hungary) 2018 FIBA Europe Under-20 Championship for Women	Continental	Spain
7–15	Softball	(Canada) 2018 Junior Men's Softball World Championship	International	Australia
7–29	Road bicycle racing	2018 Tour de France (Grand Tour #2)	International	(United Kingdom) Geraint Thomas ( (United Kingdom) Team Sky)
8	Formula One	(United Kingdom) 2018 British Grand Prix	International	(Germany) Sebastian Vettel ( (Italy) Ferrari)
8–14	Volleyball	(Dominican Republic) 2018 Women's Pan-American Volleyball Cup	Continental	United States
9–13	Beach volleyball	(Germany) 2018 World University Beach Volleyball Championship	International	Men: Germany (Dan John & Eric Stadie); Women: Canada (Nicole McNamara & Megan McNamara)
10–15	Athletics	(Finland) 2018 IAAF World U20 Championships	International	Kenya
10–15	Beach volleyball	(China) 2018 FIVB Beach Volleyball U19 World Championships	International	Men: Russia (Denis Shekunov & Dmitrii Veretiuk); Women: Russia (Mariia Bocharova & Maria Voronina)
11–18	Volleyball	(Kazakhstan) 2018 Asian Women's Club Volleyball Championship	Continental	(Thailand) Supreme Chonburi
12–14	Rugby sevens	(Namibia) 2018 World University Rugby Sevens Championship	International	Men: South Africa; Women: France
12–15	Golf	(United States) Senior Players Championship	International	(Fiji) Vijay Singh
12–15	Golf	(United States) 2018 U.S. Senior Women's Open	International	(England) Laura Davies
12–21	Lacrosse	(Israel) 2018 World Lacrosse Championship	International	United States
13	Athletics	(Morocco) Meeting International Mohammed VI d'Athlétisme de Rabat (Diamond League #9)	International	United States
13–22	Basketball	(Bulgaria) 2018 FIBA Europe Under-20 Championship Division B	Continental	Poland
14–15	Athletics	(United Kingdom) 2018 Athletics World Cup	International	United States
14–15	Formula E	(United States) 2018 New York City ePrix (FE #11 & #12)	International	Race 1: (Brazil) Lucas di Grassi ( (Germany) Abt Sportsline); Race 2: (France) Jean-Éric Vergne ( (China) Techeetah)
14–15	Triathlon	(Germany) 2018 ITU World Triathlon Series #5 (Germany) 2018 ITU Triathlon Mixed Relay World Championships	International	Men: (Spain) Mario Mola; Women: Cassandre Beaugrand; Mixed Relay: France (Léonie Périault, Dorian Coninx, Cassandre Beaugrand, & Vincent Luis)
14–21	Sailing	(United States) 2018 Youth Sailing World Championships	International	United States
14–22	Badminton	(Indonesia) 2018 Badminton Asia Junior Championships	Continental	China
14–22	Basketball	(Germany) 2018 FIBA Europe Under-20 Championship	Continental	Israel
14–22	Volleyball	(Belgium) / (Netherlands) 2018 Men's U20 Volleyball European Championship	Continental	Russia
14–27	Water polo	(Spain) 2018 Women's European Water Polo Championship	Continental	Netherlands
15	Motorcycle racing	(Germany) 2018 German motorcycle Grand Prix	International	MotoGP: (Spain) Marc Márquez ( (Belgium) Repsol Honda); Moto2: (South Africa) Brad Binder ( (Finland) Ajo Motorsport); Moto3: (Spain) Jorge Martín ( (Italy) Gresini Racing)
15	Professional boxing	(Malaysia) Manny Pacquiao vs. Lucas Matthysse	International	(Philippines) Manny Pacquiao
15–22	Beach volleyball	(Netherlands) 2018 European Beach Volleyball Championships	Continental	Men: Norway (Anders Mol & Christian Sørum); Women: Netherlands (Sanne Keizer & Madelein Meppelink)
15–24	Table tennis	(Romania) 2018 Table Tennis European Youth Championships	Continental	France
15–27	Multi-sport	(Federated States of Micronesia) 2018 Micronesian Games	Regional	Palau
15–28	Multi-sport	(Portugal) 2018 European Universities Games	Continental	(Portugal) University of Coimbra
16–20	Finswimming	(Serbia) 2018 Finswimming World Championships	International	Russia
16–26	Handball	(Oman) 2018 Asian Men's Junior Handball Championship	Continental	South Korea
16–28	Water polo	(Spain) 2018 Men's European Water Polo Championship	Continental	Serbia
16–29	Association football	(Finland) 2018 UEFA European Under-19 Championship	Continental	Portugal
17	Baseball	(United States) 2018 Major League Baseball All-Star Game	Domestic	American League; MVP: (New Mexico) Alex Bregman ( (Texas) Houston Astros)
17–21	Orienteering	(Finland) 2018 World University Orienteering Championships	International	Norway
17–22	Canoe slalom	(Italy) 2018 World Junior and U23 Canoe Slalom Championships	International	Czech Republic
17–23	Modern pentathlon	(Hungary) 2018 European Modern Pentathlon Championships	Continental	Men: (France) Valentin Prades; Women: (France) Marie Oteiza
18–22	Artistic swimming	(Hungary) 2018 FINA Artistic Swimming Junior World Championships	International	Russia
18–30	Association football	(Switzerland) 2018 UEFA Women's Under-19 Championship	Continental	Spain
19–22	Golf	(Scotland) 2018 Open Championship	International	(Italy) Francesco Molinari
19–22	Karate	(Japan) 2018 World University Karate Championship	International	Japan
19–27	Fencing	(China) 2018 World Fencing Championships	International	Italy
19–28	Multi-sport event	(Algeria) 2018 African Youth Games	Continental	Egypt
19–29	Handball	(Slovenia) 2018 European Men's Under-20 Handball Championship	Continental	Slovenia
19–3 August	Multi-sport event	(Colombia) 2018 Central American and Caribbean Games	Continental	Mexico
20	Athletics	(Monaco) Herculis (Diamond League #10)	International	United States
20–22	Rugby sevens	(United States) 2018 Rugby World Cup Sevens	International	Men: New Zealand; Women: New Zealand
21–22	Athletics	(United Kingdom) Müller Anniversary Games (Diamond League #11)	International	United States
21–28	Volleyball	(Bahrain) 2018 Asian Men's U20 Volleyball Championship	Continental	Iran
21–29	Basketball	(Belarus) 2018 FIBA Under-17 Women’s Basketball World Cup	International	United States
21–29	Darts	(England) 2018 World Matchplay	International	(Scotland) Gary Anderson
21–5 August	Field hockey	(England) 2018 Women's Hockey World Cup	International	Netherlands
21–12 August	Association football	(Council of Europe) / (Singapore) / (United States) 2018 International Champions Cup	International	(England) Tottenham Hotspur
22	Formula One	(Germany) 2018 German Grand Prix	International	(United Kingdom) Lewis Hamilton ( (Germany) Mercedes)
22–29	Olympic weightlifting	(Italy) 2018 European Youth Weightlifting Championships	Continental	Romania
23–29	Diving	(Ukraine) 2018 FINA World Junior Diving Championships	International	China
23–29	Muay Thai	(Thailand) 2018 World University Muaythai Championship	International	Thailand
24–29	Beach handball	(Russia) 2018 Men's Beach Handball World Championships (Russia) 2018 Women's Beach Handball World Championships	International	Men: Brazil; Women: Greece
25–29	Rowing	(Poland) 2018 World Rowing U23 Championships	International	United States
26–29	Rallying	2018 Rally Finland (WRC #8)	International	Estonia (Ott Tänak & Martin Järveoja) ( (Finland) Toyota Gazoo Racing WRT)
26–29	Golf	(Scotland) Senior Open Championship	International	(Spain) Miguel Ángel Jiménez
26–29	Beach volleyball	(Latvia) 2018 European U22 Beach Volleyball Championships	Continental	Men: Latvia (Kristaps Šmits & Mihails Samoilovs); Women: Russia (Nadezda Makroguzova & Svetlana Kholomina)
27–29	Association football	(United States) 2018 Women's International Champions Cup	International	(United States) North Carolina Courage
27–29	Triathlon	(Canada) 2018 ITU World Triathlon Series #6 (Canada) 2018 ITU World Triathlon Mixed Relay Series #2	International	Men: (Spain) Mario Mola; Women: (United Kingdom) Vicky Holland; Mixed Relay: Australia (Ashleigh Gentle, Aaron Royle, Natalie van Coevorden, & Jacob Birtwhistle)
28–5 August	Basketball	(Latvia) 2018 FIBA Europe Under-18 Championship	Continental	Serbia
29	Formula One	(Hungary) 2018 Hungarian Grand Prix	International	(United Kingdom) Lewis Hamilton ( (Germany) Mercedes)
29–4 August	American football	(Finland) 2018 European Championship of American football	Continental	France
29–7 August	Modern pentathlon	(Czech Republic) 2018 World Junior Modern Pentathlon Championships	International	Men: (Egypt) Ahmed El Gendy; Women: (Italy) Elena Micheli
30–5 August	Badminton	(China) 2018 BWF World Championships	International	Men: (Japan) Kento Momota; Women: (Spain) Carolina Marín
30–5 August	Handball	(Croatia) 2018 World University Handball Championship	International	Men: South Korea; Women: Japan
30–6 August	Volleyball	(Myanmar) 2018 Asian Men's Club Volleyball Championship	Continental	(Iran) Khatam Ardakan
30–12 August	Sailing	(Denmark) 2018 Sailing World Championships	International	Netherlands
30–12 August	Shooting sport	(Austria) 2018 European Shotgun Championship	Continental	Italy
31–4 August	Road bicycle racing	(Portugal) 2018 World University Cycling Championship	International	Germany

=== August ===
Date	Sport	Venue/Event	Status	Winner/s
1–5	Athletics	(Nigeria) 2018 African Championships in Athletics	Continental	Kenya
1–7	Basketball	(Mexico) 2018 FIBA Under-18 Women's Americas Championship	Continental	United States
2–5	Artistic gymnastics	(United Kingdom) 2018 European Women's Artistic Gymnastics Championships	Continental	Italy
2–5	Golf	(England) 2018 Women's British Open	International	(England) Georgia Hall
2–5	Wushu	(Macau) 2018 World University Wushu Championship	International	China
2–5	Golf	(United States) 2018 WGC-Bridgestone Invitational	International	(United States) Justin Thomas
2–5	Rowing	(United Kingdom) 2018 European Rowing Championships	Continental	Romania
2–7	Track cycling	(United Kingdom) 2018 UEC European Track Championships	Continental	Netherlands
2–12	Multi-sport	(United Kingdom) / (Germany) 2018 European Championships	Continental	Russia
2–12	Softball	(Japan) 2018 Women's Softball World Championship	International	United States
3–12	Aquatic sports	(United Kingdom) 2018 European Aquatics Championships	Continental	Russia
4–11	Orienteering	(Latvia) 2018 World Orienteering Championships	International	Norway
4–12	Basketball	(Italy) 2018 FIBA Under-18 Women's European Championship	Continental	Germany
5	Motorcycle racing	2018 Czech Republic motorcycle Grand Prix	International	MotoGP: (Italy) Andrea Dovizioso ( (Italy) Ducati Corse); Moto2: (Portugal) Miguel Oliveira ( (Finland) Ajo Motorsport); Moto3: (Italy) Fabio Di Giannantonio ( (Italy) Gresini Racing)
5–10	Wheelchair rugby	(Australia) 2018 Wheelchair Rugby World Championship	International	Japan
5–11	Basketball	(Thailand) 2018 FIBA Under-18 Asian Championship	Continental	Australia
5–12	Road bicycle racing	(United Kingdom) 2018 European Road Cycling Championships	Continental	Men's Road: (Italy) Matteo Trentin; Women's Road: (Italy) Marta Bastianelli; Men's TT: (Belgium) Victor Campenaerts; Women's TT: (Netherlands) Ellen van Dijk
5–18	Association football	(French Polynesia) 2018 OFC U-19 Championship	Continental	New Zealand
5–24	Association football	(France) 2018 FIFA U-20 Women's World Cup	International	Japan
6–12	Athletics	(Germany) 2018 European Athletics Championships	Continental	Great Britain
6–12	Tennis	(Canada) 2018 Rogers Cup	International	Men: (Spain) Rafael Nadal; Women: (Romania) Simona Halep
7	Mountain bike racing	(United Kingdom) 2018 European Mountain Bike Championships	Continental	Men: (Switzerland) Lars Förster; Women: (Switzerland) Jolanda Neff
7–19	Handball	(Poland) 2018 Women's Youth World Handball Championship	International	Russia
8–12	Golf	(United Kingdom) 2018 European Golf Team Championships	Continental	Men's Team: Spain; Women's Team: Sweden; Mixed Team: Iceland
8–12	Rowing	(Czech Republic) 2018 World Rowing Junior Championships	International	United States
9–11	Triathlon	(United Kingdom) 2018 European Triathlon Championships	Continental	Men: Pierre Le Corre; Women: (Switzerland) Nicola Spirig; Mixed Relay: France
9–12	Artistic gymnastics	(United Kingdom) 2018 European Men's Artistic Gymnastics Championships	Continental	Russia
9–12	Golf	(United States) 2018 PGA Championship	International	(United States) Brooks Koepka
9–14	Swimming	(Japan) 2018 Pan Pacific Swimming Championships	Continental	United States
9–19	Handball	(Croatia) 2018 European Men's U-18 Handball Championship	Continental	Sweden
10–11	BMX racing	(United Kingdom) 2018 European BMX Championships	Continental	Men: (United Kingdom) Kyle Evans; Women: (Netherlands) Laura Smulders
10–12	Athletics	(Canada) 2018 NACAC Championships	Regional	United States
10–12	Rowing	(China) 2018 World University Rowing Championships	International	Great Britain
10–12	Canoe sprint	(Hungary) 2018 World University Canoe Sprint Championship	International	Hungary
10–18	Basketball	(Serbia) 2018 FIBA Europe Under-16 Championship	Continental	Croatia
10–19	Basketball	(Mozambique) 2018 FIBA Under-18 Women's African Championship	Continental	Mali
10–19	Racquetball	(Costa Rica) 2018 Racquetball World Championships	International	Men: (Mexico) Rodrigo Montoya; Women: (Guatemala) Ana Gabriela Martinez
10–19	Baseball	(Panama) 2018 U-15 Baseball World Cup	International	United States
11–19	Water polo	(Hungary) 2018 FINA World Men's Youth Water Polo Championships	International	Greece
12	Motorcycle racing	(Austria) 2018 Austrian motorcycle Grand Prix	International	MotoGP: (Spain) Jorge Lorenzo ( (Italy) Ducati Corse); Moto2: (Italy) Francesco Bagnaia ( (Italy) Sky Racing Team by VR46); Moto3: (Italy) Marco Bezzecchi ( (Germany) Redox Prüstel GP)
13–19	Tennis	(United States) 2018 Western & Southern Open	International	Men: (Serbia) Novak Djokovic; Women: (Netherlands) Kiki Bertens
14–19	Archery	(Colombia) 2018 Pan American Archery Championships	Continental	United States
14–19	Beach volleyball	(Germany) 2018 FIVB Beach Volleyball World Tour Finals	International	Men: (Norway) Anders Mol / Christian Sørum; Women: (Brazil) Ágatha Bednarczuk / Eduarda Santos Lisboa
15	Association football	(Estonia) 2018 UEFA Super Cup	Continental	(Spain) Atlético Madrid
15–19	Track cycling	(Switzerland) 2018 UCI Junior Track Cycling World Championships	International	Germany
15–19	Disc golf	(Croatia) 2018 European Disc Golf Championships	Continental	Men: (Germany) Simon Lizotte; Women: (Finland) Henna Blomroos
15–19	Canoe slalom	(Slovakia) 2018 European Junior and U23 Canoe Slalom Championships	Continental	Czech Republic
16–19	Rallying	(Germany) 2018 Rallye Deutschland (WRC #9)	International	(Estonia) Ott Tänak & Martin Järveoja ( (Japan) Toyota Gazoo Racing WRT)
17–25	Basketball	(Lithuania) 2018 FIBA Europe Under-16 Championship for Women	Continental	Italy
17–26	Wheelchair basketball	(Germany) 2018 Wheelchair Basketball World Championship	International	Men: Great Britain; Women: Netherlands
18	Athletics	(United Kingdom) Müller Grand Prix Birmingham (Diamond League #12)	International	Kenya
18	Triathlon	(Switzerland) 2018 ITU Triathlon World Cup #11	International	Men: (Norway) Gustav Iden; Women: (Switzerland) Nicola Spirig
18–2 September	Multi-sport	(Indonesia) 2018 Asian Games	Continental	China
18–6 October	Rugby union	(Argentina) / (Australia) / (New Zealand) / (South Africa) 2018 Rugby Championship	International	New Zealand
19–26	Futsal	(Kazakhstan) 2018 World University Futsal Championships	International	Russia (Men & Women)
20–26	Para-athletics	(Germany) 2018 World Para Athletics European Championships	Continental	Poland
20–31	Amateur boxing	(Hungary) 2018 AIBA Youth World Boxing Championships	International	Russia
21–26	Summer biathlon	(Czech Republic) 2018 Summer Biathlon World Championships	International	Czech Republic
21–26	Track cycling	(Switzerland) 2018 UEC European Track Championships (under-23 & junior)	Continental	Italy
21–12 September	Basketball	(United States) 2018 WNBA Playoffs	Domestic	(Washington (state)) Seattle Storm
22–31	Baseball	(United States) 2018 Women's Baseball World Cup	International	Japan
23–26	Canoe sprint	(Portugal) 2018 ICF Canoe Sprint World Championships	International	Germany
23–29	Carrom	(South Korea) 2018 Carrom World Cup	International	Men: Sri Lanka; Women: India
24–2 September	Basketball	(Mali) 2018 FIBA Under-18 African Championship	Continental	Mali
24–10 September	Rugby union	(Romania) 2018 World Rugby Under 20 Trophy	International	Fiji
25–26	Triathlon	(Canada) 2018 ITU World Triathlon Series #7	International	Men: (Spain) Mario Mola; Women: (United Kingdom) Vicky Holland
25–16 September	Road bicycle racing	(Spain) 2018 Vuelta a España (Grand Tour #3)	International	(United Kingdom) Simon Yates ( (Australia) Mitchelton–Scott)
26	Formula One	(Belgium) 2018 Belgian Grand Prix	International	(Germany) Sebastian Vettel ( (Italy) Ferrari)
27–1 September	Archery	(Poland) 2018 European Archery Championships	Continental	Turkey
27–2 September	Water polo	(Serbia) 2018 FINA World Women's Youth Water Polo Championships	International	Men: Greece; Women: Spain
27–9 September	Tennis	(United States) 2018 US Open (Grand Slam #4)	International	Men: (Serbia) Novak Djokovic; Women: (Japan) Naomi Osaka
28–2 September	Volleyball	(Mexico) 2018 Men's Pan-American Volleyball Cup	Continental	Argentina
29–2 September	Track cycling	(Mexico) 2018 Pan American Track Cycling Championships	Continental	United States
29–3 September	Drag racing	(United States) 2018 NHRA Chevrolet Performance U.S. Nationals	Domestic	For results, click here.
30	Athletics	(Switzerland) Weltklasse Zürich (Diamond League #13)	International	Kenya
30–4 September	Basketball	(Colombia) 2018 South American Basketball Championship for Women	Continental	Argentina
31	Athletics	(Belgium) Memorial Van Damme (Diamond League #14)	International	United States
31–2 September	3x3 basketball	(Hungary) 2018 FIBA 3x3 Under-18 Europe Cup	Continental	Men: Hungary; Women: Belgium

=== September ===
Date	Sport	Venue/Event	Status	Winner/s
1–2	Rowing	(Belarus) 2018 European Rowing U23 Championships	Continental	Romania
1–2	Triathlon	(Sweden) 2018 FISU World University Triathlon Championship	International	Men: (Germany) Lars Pfeifer; Women: Jeanne Lehair; Mixed Team Relay: France
1–2	Triathlon	(South Africa) 2018 Ironman 70.3 World Championship	International	Men: (Germany) Jan Frodeno; Women: (Switzerland) Daniela Ryf
1–2	Triathlon	(Czech Republic) 2018 ITU Triathlon World Cup #12	International	Men: (Russia) Dmitry Polyanski; Women: (Czech Republic) Vendula Frintová
1–5	Sailing	(France) 2018 FISU World University Sailing Championship	International	Men: Australia (Skipper: Thomas Grimes); Women: France (Skipper: Elodie Bonafous)
1–6	Amateur boxing	(Russia) 2018 FISU World University Boxing Championships	International	Russia
1–9	Netball	(Singapore) 2018 Asian Netball Championships	Continental	Sri Lanka
1–9	Volleyball	(Albania) 2018 Women's U19 Volleyball European Championship	Continental	Italy
1–8 December	American football	(United States) 2018 NCAA Division I FBS football season	Domestic	Alabama Crimson Tide
2	Formula One	(Italy) 2018 Italian Grand Prix	International	(United Kingdom) Lewis Hamilton ( (Germany) Mercedes)
2–14	Shooting sport	(South Korea) 2018 ISSF World Shooting Championships	International	China
3–8	Six-red snooker	(Thailand) 2018 Six-red World Championship	International	(England) Kyren Wilson
4–9	Amateur wrestling	(Brazil) 2018 FISU World University Wrestling Championship	International	Men's Freestyle: Japan; Women's Freestyle: Canada; Greco-Roman: Turkey
4–9	Field archery	(Italy) 2018 World Field Archery Championships	International	Italy
4–9	Water polo	(Russia) 2018 FINA Women's Water Polo World Cup	International	United States
4–15	Association football	(Bangladesh) 2018 SAFF Championship	Regional	Maldives
4–16	Chess	(Turkey) 2018 World Junior Chess Championship	International	Men: (Iran) Parham Maghsoodloo; Women: (Russia) Aleksandra Maltsevskaya
5–9	Mountain bike racing	(Switzerland) 2018 UCI Mountain Bike World Championships	International	Switzerland
6–12	Squash	(United Kingdom) 2018 FISU World University Squash Championship	International	Great Britain
6–15	Modern pentathlon	(Mexico) 2018 World Modern Pentathlon Championships	International	Men: (United Kingdom) James Cooke; Women: (Belarus) Anastasiya Prokopenko
6–16	Sport climbing	(Austria) 2018 IFSC Climbing World Championships	International	Men: (Austria) Jakob Schubert; Women: (Slovenia) Janja Garnbret
6–30 December	American football	(United States) 2018 NFL season	Domestic	AFC: (Missouri) Kansas City Chiefs; NFC: (Louisiana) New Orleans Saints
7–14	Handball	(Morocco) 2018 African Men's Junior Handball Championship	Continental	Egypt
7–15	Multi-sport	(Malaysia) 2018 Asia Pacific Masters Games	Continental	For all the individual sports results, click here.
7–16	Badminton	(Estonia) 2018 European Junior Badminton Championships	Continental	France
8	Ultramarathon	(Croatia) 2018 IAU 100 km World Championships	International	Men: (Japan) Hideaki Yamauchi; Women: (Croatia) Nikolina Šustić
8–9	Athletics	(Czech Republic) 2018 IAAF Continental Cup	International	Team Americas
9	Motorcycle racing	2018 San Marino and Rimini's Coast motorcycle Grand Prix	International	MotoGP: (Italy) Andrea Dovizioso ( (Italy) Ducati Corse); Moto2: (Italy) Francesco Bagnaia ( (Italy) Sky Racing Team by VR46); Moto3: (Italy) Lorenzo Dalla Porta ( (United Kingdom) Leopard Racing)
9–16	Rowing	(Bulgaria) 2018 World Rowing Championships	International	Italy
9–22	Association football	(Solomon Islands) 2018 OFC U-16 Championship	Continental	New Zealand
10–16	Rhythmic gymnastics	(Bulgaria) 2018 Rhythmic Gymnastics World Championships	International	Russia
10–16	Swimming	(Algeria) 2018 African Swimming Championships	Continental	Egypt
10–30	Volleyball	(Italy) / (Bulgaria) 2018 FIVB Volleyball Men's World Championship	International	Poland
11–16	Water polo	(Germany) 2018 FINA Men's Water Polo World Cup	International	Hungary
11–23	Equestrianism	(United States) 2018 FEI World Equestrian Games	International	Germany
12–16	Curling	(China) 2018–19 Curling World Cup – First Leg	International	Men: Canada (Skip: Kevin Koe); Women: Canada (Skip: Rachel Homan); Mixed Doubles: Canada (Laura Walker & Kirk Muyres)
12–16	Triathlon	(Australia) 2018 ITU World Triathlon Series Grand Final	International	Men: (France) Vincent Luis; Women: (Australia) Ashleigh Gentle
12–18	Chess	(Brazil) 2018 FISU World University Chess Championship	International	
13–16	Rallying	2018 Rally Turkey (WRC #10)	International	(Estonia) Ott Tänak & (Estonia) Martin Järveoja ( (Japan) Toyota Gazoo Racing WRT)
13–16	Golf	(France) 2018 Evian Championship	International	(United States) Angela Stanford
14–15	Mountain bike racing	(Italy) 2018 UCI Mountain Bike Marathon World Championships	International	Men: (Brazil) Henrique Avancini; Women: (Denmark) Annika Langvad
14–16	3x3 basketball	(Romania) 2018 FIBA 3x3 Europe Cup	Continental	Men: Serbia; Women: France
15	Professional boxing	(United States) Canelo Álvarez vs. Gennady Golovkin II	International	(Mexico) Canelo Álvarez
15–22	Handball	(Morocco) 2018 African Men's Youth Handball Championship	Continental	Egypt
15–22	Surfing	(Japan) 2018 ISA World Surfing Games	International	Men: (Argentina) Santiago Muñiz; Women: (Australia) Sally Fitzgibbons
15–23	Netball	(Australia) / (New Zealand) 2018 Netball Quad Series (September)	International	Australia
15–28	Cricket	(United Arab Emirates) 2018 Asia Cup	Continental	India
16	Formula One	2018 Singapore Grand Prix	International	(United Kingdom) Lewis Hamilton ( (Germany) Mercedes)
16	Marathon	(Germany) 2018 Berlin Marathon (WMM #4)	International	Men: (Kenya) Eliud Kipchoge; Women: (Kenya) Gladys Cherono Kiprono
16	Mountain running	(Andorra) 2018 World Mountain Running Championships	International	Men: (Uganda) Robert Chemonges; Women: (Kenya) Lucy Wambui Murigi
16–26	Handball	(Jordan) 2018 Asian Men's Youth Handball Championship	Continental	Bahrain
17–21	Netball	(Uganda) 2018 FISU World University Netball Championship	International	Uganda
17–23	Amateur wrestling	(Slovakia) 2018 World Junior Wrestling Championships	International	Men's Freestyle: Russia; Women's Freestyle: Japan; Greco-Roman: Iran
18–23	Table tennis	(Spain) 2018 European Table Tennis Championships	Continental	Men: (Germany) Timo Boll; Women: (Poland) Li Qian
20–23	Weightlifting	(Poland) 2018 FISU World University Weightlifting Championships	International	Japan
20–27	Judo	(Azerbaijan) 2018 World Judo Championships	International	Japan
20–7 October	Association football	(Malaysia) 2018 AFC U-16 Championship	Continental	Japan
21–23	Tennis	(United States) 2018 Laver Cup	International	Team Europe
22	Triathlon	(China) 2018 ITU Triathlon World Cup #13	International	Men: (Norway) Gustav Iden; Women: (United States) Taylor Spivey
22–30	Basketball	(Spain) 2018 FIBA Women's Basketball World Cup	International	United States
22–30	Road bicycle racing	(Austria) 2018 UCI Road World Championships	International	Netherlands
23	Motorcycle racing	2018 Aragon motorcycle Grand Prix	International	MotoGP: (Spain) Marc Márquez ( (Belgium) Repsol Honda); Moto2: (South Africa) Brad Binder ( (Finland) Ajo Motorsport); Moto3: (Spain) Jorge Martín ( (Italy) Gresini Racing)
23–6 October	Chess	(Georgia (country)) 43rd Chess Olympiad	International	Open: China; Women: China
25–30	Canoe slalom	(Brazil) 2018 ICF Canoe Slalom World Championships	International	Great Britain
28–30	Golf	(France) 2018 Ryder Cup	International	(European Union) Team Europe
28–30	Table tennis	(China) 2018 ITTF Women's World Cup	International	(China) Ding Ning
30	Formula One	(Russia) 2018 Russian Grand Prix	International	(United Kingdom) Lewis Hamilton ( (Germany) Mercedes)
30–6 October	Darts	(Republic of Ireland) 2018 World Grand Prix	International	(Netherlands) Michael van Gerwen
30–20 October	Volleyball	(Japan) 2018 FIVB Volleyball Women's World Championship	International	Serbia

=== October ===
Date	Sport	Venue/Event	Status	Winner/s
1–13	Rugby league	(Australia) 2018 Emerging Nations World Championship	International	Malta
3–9	Handball	(Kazakhstan) 2018 Asian Women's Club League Handball Championship	Continental	(Kazakhstan) Almaty Club
4–7	Golf	(South Korea) 2018 International Crown	International	South Korea
4–7	Rallying	(United Kingdom) 2018 Wales Rally GB (WRC #11)	International	(France) Sébastien Ogier & (France) Julien Ingrassia ( (United Kingdom) M-Sport World Rally Team)
4–17	Association football	(United States) 2018 CONCACAF Women's Championship	Continental	United States
6–7	Motorcycle racing	(United States) 2018 Motocross des Nations	International	France
6–13	Multi-sport	(Indonesia) 2018 Asian Para Games	Continental	China
6–18	Multi-sport	(Argentina) 2018 Summer Youth Olympics	International	Russia
7	Formula One	(Japan) 2018 Japanese Grand Prix	International	(United Kingdom) Lewis Hamilton ( (Germany) Mercedes)
7	Horse racing	(France) 2018 Prix de l'Arc de Triomphe	International	Horse: (United Kingdom) Enable; Jockey: (Italy) Frankie Dettori; Trainer: (United Kingdom) John Gosden
7	Marathon	(United States) 2018 Chicago Marathon (WMM #5)	International	Men: (United Kingdom) Mo Farah; Women: (Kenya) Brigid Kosgei
7	Motorcycle racing	2018 Thailand motorcycle Grand Prix	International	MotoGP: (Spain) Marc Márquez ( (Belgium) Repsol Honda); Moto2: (Italy) Francesco Bagnaia ( (Italy) SKY Racing Team by VR46); Moto3: (Italy) Fabio Di Giannantonio ( (Italy) Gresini Racing)
7–14	Tennis	(China) 2018 Shanghai Masters	International	(Serbia) Novak Djokovic
11–17	Golf	(United States) 2018 Senior LPGA Championship	International	(England) Laura Davies
13	Road bicycle racing	(Italy) 2018 Il Lombardia (Monument #5)	International	(France) Thibaut Pinot ( (France) Groupama–FDJ)
13	Triathlon	(United States) 2018 Ironman World Championship	International	Men: (Germany) Patrick Lange; Women: (Switzerland) Daniela Ryf
13	Triathlon	(United States) 2018 ITU Triathlon World Cup #15	International	Men: (France) Vincent Luis; Women: (United States) Renee Tomlin
13–14	Rugby sevens	(Tunisia) 2018 Africa Men's Sevens	Continental	Zimbabwe
13–20	Curling	(Canada) 2018 World Mixed Curling Championship	International	Canada (Skip: Mike Anderson)
15–21	Badminton	(Malaysia) 2018 World University Badminton Championships	International	Chinese Taipei
16–19	Handball	(Qatar) 2018 IHF Super Globe	International	(Spain) Barcelona
18–28	Field hockey	(Oman) 2018 Asian Men's Hockey Champions Trophy	Continental	India / Pakistan
18–4 November	Association football	(Indonesia) 2018 AFC U-19 Championship	Continental	Saudi Arabia
19–21	Table tennis	(France) 2018 ITTF Men's World Cup	International	(China) Fan Zhendong
19–28	Baseball	(Colombia) 2018 U-23 Baseball World Cup	International	Mexico
19–1 November	Chess	(Greece) 2018 World Youth Chess Championship	International	Men's U18: (Slovakia) Viktor Gazik; Women's U18: (Russia) Polina Shuvalova
20–21	Rugby sevens	(United States) 2018 USA Women's Sevens (WRWSS #1)	International	New Zealand
20–27	Olympic weightlifting	(Poland) 2018 European Junior & U23 Weightlifting Championships	Continental	Russia
20–28	Amateur wrestling	(Hungary) 2018 World Wrestling Championships	International	Russia
21	Formula One	2018 United States Grand Prix	International	(Finland) Kimi Räikkönen ( (Italy) Ferrari)
21	Motorcycle racing	(Japan) 2018 Japanese motorcycle Grand Prix	International	MotoGP: (Spain) Marc Márquez ( (Belgium) Repsol Honda); Moto2: (Italy) Francesco Bagnaia ( (Italy) SKY Racing Team by VR46); Moto3: (Italy) Marco Bezzecchi ( (Germany) Redox PrüstelGP)
21	Triathlon	(Ecuador) 2018 ITU Triathlon World Cup #16	International	Men: (Spain) David Castro Fajardo; Women: (Ukraine) Yuliya Yelistratova
21–28	Tennis	(Singapore) 2018 WTA Finals	International	Singles: (Ukraine) Elina Svitolina; Doubles: (Hungary) Tímea Babos / (France) Kristina Mladenovic
23–28	Baseball	(United States) 2018 World Series	Domestic	(Massachusetts) Boston Red Sox
25–28	Golf	(China) 2018 WGC-HSBC Champions	International	(United States) Xander Schauffele
25–28	Rallying	(Catalonia) 2018 Rally Catalunya (WRC #12)	International	(France) Sébastien Loeb & (Monaco) Daniel Elena ( (France) Citroën World Rally Team)
25–28	Darts	(Germany) 2018 European Championship	International	(England) James Wade
25–3 November	Artistic gymnastics	(Qatar) 2018 World Artistic Gymnastics Championships	International	United States
27	Triathlon	(South Korea) 2018 ITU Triathlon World Cup #17	International	Men: (Switzerland) Max Studer; Women: (Japan) Ai Ueda
27–28	Netball	(Australia) 2018 Fast5 Netball World Series	International	New Zealand
28	Formula One	(Mexico) 2018 Mexican Grand Prix	International	(Netherlands) Max Verstappen ( (Austria) Red Bull Racing)
28	Motorcycle racing	(Australia) 2018 Australian motorcycle Grand Prix	International	MotoGP: (Spain) Maverick Viñales ( (Italy) Yamaha Motor Racing); Moto2: (South Africa) Brad Binder ( (Finland) Ajo Motorsport); Moto3: (Spain) Albert Arenas ( (Spain) Ángel Nieto Team)
28–3 November	Basketball	(India) 2018 FIBA Under-18 Women's Asian Championship	Continental	China
29–4 November	Tennis	(France) 2018 Paris Masters	International	(Russia) Karen Khachanov
30–4 November	Tennis	(China) 2018 WTA Elite Trophy	International	(Australia) Ashleigh Barty

=== November ===
Date	Sport	Venue/Event	Status	Winner/s
1–10	Weightlifting	(Turkmenistan) 2018 World Weightlifting Championships	International	China
1–21	Association football	(United States) 2018 CONCACAF U-20 Championship	Continental	United States
2–3	Horse racing	(United States) 2018 Breeders' Cup	International	Breeders' Cup Classic: Horse: (United States) Accelerate; Jockey: (Dominican Republic) Joel Rosario; Trainer: (United States) John Sadler
2–4	Judo	(Hungary) 2018 European U23 Judo Championships	Continental	Russia
2–9	Association football	(Egypt) / (Tunisia) 2018 CAF Champions League Final	Continental	(Tunisia) Espérance de Tunis
2–12	Shooting sport	(Mexico) 2018 Shooting Championship of the Americas	Continental	United States
2–23	Chess	(Russia) Women's World Chess Championship 2018 (tournament)	International	(China) Ju Wenjun
3	Cyclocross	(Netherlands) 2018 UEC European Cyclo-cross Championships	Continental	Men: (Netherlands) Mathieu van der Poel; Women: (Netherlands) Annemarie Worst
3–10	Association football	(Japan) / (Iran) 2018 AFC Champions League Final	Continental	(Japan) Kashima Antlers
3–10	Curling	(South Korea) 2018 Pacific-Asia Curling Championships	Continental	Men: Japan (Skip: Yuta Matsumura); Women: South Korea (Skip: Kim Min-ji)
4	Marathon	(United States) 2018 New York City Marathon (WMM #6)	International	Men: (Ethiopia) Lelisa Desisa; Women: (Kenya) Mary Keitany
4	Motorcycle racing	(Malaysia) 2018 Malaysian motorcycle Grand Prix	International	MotoGP: (Spain) Marc Márquez ( (Belgium) Repsol Honda); Moto2: (Italy) Luca Marini ( (Italy) Sky Racing Team by VR46); Moto3: (Spain) Jorge Martin ( (Italy) Gresini Racing)
5–18	Badminton	(Canada) 2018 BWF World Junior Championships	International	China
6	Horse racing	(Australia) 2018 Melbourne Cup	International	Horse: (United Kingdom) Cross Counter; Jockey: (Australia) Kerrin McEvoy; Trainer: (United Kingdom) Charlie Appleby
6–10	Beach soccer	(United Arab Emirates) 2018 Beach Soccer Intercontinental Cup	International	Iran
6–10	Tennis	(Italy) 2018 Next Generation ATP Finals	International	(Greece) Stefanos Tsitsipas
6–11	Karate	(Spain) 2018 World Karate Championships	International	Japan
7–10	Trampolining	(Russia) 2018 Trampoline Gymnastics World Championships	International	China
7–11	Swimming	(Peru) 2018 South American Swimming Championships	Continental	Brazil
8–12	Sambo	(Romania) 2018 World Sambo Championships	International	Russia
8–15	Baseball	2018 MLB Japan All-Star Series	International	Samurai Japan
9–24	Cricket	(Cricket West Indies) 2018 ICC Women's World Twenty20	International	Australia
9–28	Chess	(England) World Chess Championship 2018	International	(Norway) Magnus Carlsen
10	Triathlon	(Japan) 2018 ITU Triathlon World Cup #18	International	Men: (Spain) Vicente Hernández; Women: (United States) Summer Cook
10–11	Tennis	(Czech Republic) 2018 Fed Cup Final	International	Czech Republic
10–18	Darts	(England) 2018 Grand Slam of Darts	International	(Wales) Gerwyn Price
10–9 December	Association football	(Argentina) / (Spain) 2018 Copa Libertadores Finals	Continental	(Argentina) River Plate
11	Formula One	(Brazil) 2018 Brazilian Grand Prix	International	(United Kingdom) Lewis Hamilton ( (Germany) Mercedes)
11–18	Tennis	(United Kingdom) 2018 ATP Finals	International	Singles: (Germany) Alexander Zverev; Doubles: (United States) Mike Bryan / Jack Sock
12–18	Amateur wrestling	(Romania) 2018 World U23 Wrestling Championship	International	Men's Freestyle: Russia; Women's Freestyle: Japan; Greco-Roman: Georgia
13–1 December	Association football	(Uruguay) 2018 FIFA U-17 Women's World Cup	International	Spain
15–18	Golf	(United States) 2018 CME Group Tour Championship	International	(United States) Lexi Thompson
15–18	Rallying	2018 Rally Australia (WRC #13)	International	(Finland) Jari-Matti Latvala & Miikka Anttila ( (Japan) Toyota Gazoo Racing WRT)
15–24	Amateur boxing	(India) 2018 AIBA Women's World Boxing Championships	International	China
16–24	Curling	(Estonia) 2018 European Curling Championships	Continental	Men: Scotland (Skip: Bruce Mouat); Women: Sweden (Skip: Anna Hasselborg)
17–25	Field hockey	(China) 2018 Women's Hockey Champions Trophy	International	Netherlands
17–1 December	Association football	(Ghana) 2018 Africa Women Cup of Nations	Continental	Nigeria
18	Motorcycle racing	2018 Valencian Community motorcycle Grand Prix	International	MotoGP: (Italy) Andrea Dovizioso ( (Italy) Ducati Corse); Moto2: (Portugal) Miguel Oliveira ( (Finland) Ajo Motorsport); Moto3: (Turkey) Can Öncü ( (Finland) Ajo Motorsport)
18–1 December	Association football	(New Caledonia) 2018 OFC Women's Nations Cup	Continental	New Zealand
20–25	Table tennis	(Chile) 2018 Pan American Table Tennis Championships	Continental	Men: (United States) Kanak Jha; Women: (Puerto Rico) Adriana Díaz
21–25	Golf	(Australia) 2018 World Cup of Golf	International	Belgium (Thomas Pieters & Thomas Detry)
23–25	Tennis	(France) 2018 Davis Cup Final	International	Croatia
25	Canadian football	(Canada) 106th Grey Cup	Domestic	(Alberta) Calgary Stampeders
25	Formula One	(United Arab Emirates) 2018 Abu Dhabi Grand Prix	International	(United Kingdom) Lewis Hamilton ( (Germany) Mercedes)
25	Horse racing	2018 Japan Cup	International	Horse: (Japan) Almond Eye; Jockey: (France) Christophe Lemaire; Trainer: (Japan) Sakae Kunieda
26–2 December	Volleyball	(Poland) 2018 FIVB Volleyball Men's Club World Championship	International	(Italy) Trentino Volley
27–9 December	Snooker	(England) 2018 UK Championship (Triple Crown #1)	International	(England) Ronnie O'Sullivan
28–16 December	Field hockey	(India) 2018 Men's Hockey World Cup	International	Belgium
29–1 December	Rugby sevens	(United Arab Emirates) 2018 Dubai Sevens (WRSS #1) (United Arab Emirates) 2018 Dubai Women's Sevens (WRWSS #2)	International	Men: New Zealand; Women: New Zealand
29–4 December	Handball	(Brazil) 2018 South and Central American Women's Handball Championship	Continental	Brazil
29–16 December	Handball	(France) 2018 European Women's Handball Championship	Continental	France
30–9 December	Handball	(Japan) 2018 Asian Women's Handball Championship	Continental	South Korea

=== December ===
Date	Sport	Venue/Event	Status	Winner/s
1	Auto racing	(Bahrain) 2018 FIA GT Nations Cup	International	Turkey (Ayhancan Güven & Salih Yoluç) ( (United Kingdom) Ram Racing)
1	Professional boxing	(United States) Deontay Wilder vs. Tyson Fury	International	(United States) Deontay Wilder & (United Kingdom) Tyson Fury fought to a Split Decision Draw
1–9	Floorball	(Czech Republic) 2018 Men's World Floorball Championships	International	Finland
2–9	Table tennis	(Australia) 2018 World Junior Table Tennis Championships	International	China
2–12	Handball	(Republic of the Congo) 2018 African Women's Handball Championship	Continental	Angola
4–7	Nine-ball pool	(England) 2018 Mosconi Cup	International	(United States) Team USA
4–9	Volleyball	(China) 2018 FIVB Volleyball Women's Club World Championship	International	(Turkey) Vakıfbank İstanbul
5–9	Curling	(United States) 2018–19 Curling World Cup – Second Leg	International	Men's: United States (Skip: John Shuster); Women's: Japan (Skip: Satsuki Fujisawa); Mixed Doubles: Norway (Kristin Skaslien & Magnus Nedregotten)
5–12	Association football	(Colombia) / (Brazil) 2018 Copa Sudamericana Finals	Continental	(Brazil) Atlético Paranaense
6–9	Figure skating	(Canada) 2018–19 Grand Prix of Figure Skating Final	International	Men: Nathan Chen; Ladies: (Japan) Rika Kihira; Pairs: France (Vanessa James & Morgan Ciprès); Ice Dance: United States (Madison Hubbell & Zachary Donohue)
8–9	Rugby sevens	2018 South Africa Sevens (WRSS #2)	International	Fiji
8–14	Beach soccer	(Egypt) 2018 Africa Beach Soccer Cup of Nations	Continental	Senegal
8–14	Ice hockey	(Poland) 2019 World Junior Ice Hockey Championships – Division I Group B	International	Slovenia was promoted to Division I – Group A Japan was relegated to Division II – Group A
9	Cross country running	(Netherlands) 2018 European Cross Country Championships	Continental	Men: (Norway) Filip Ingebrigtsen; Women: (Turkey) Yasemin Can
9	Horse racing	2018 Hong Kong Cup	International	Horse: (United Kingdom) Glorious Forever; Jockey: (Brazil) Silvestre de Sousa; Trainer: (Hong Kong) Frankie Lor
9–15	Ice hockey	(Germany) 2019 World Junior Ice Hockey Championships – Division I Group A	International	Germany was promoted to Top Division; France was relegated to Division I – Group B
11–16	Swimming	(China) 2018 FINA World Swimming Championships (25 m)	International	United States
12–16	Badminton	(China) 2018 BWF World Tour Finals	International	Men: (China) Shi Yuqi; Women: (India) P. V. Sindhu
12–16	Taekwondo	(China) 2018 World Taekwondo Grand Slam	International	Great Britain
12–22	Association football	(United Arab Emirates) 2018 FIFA Club World Cup	International	(Spain) Real Madrid
13–16	Table tennis	(South Korea) 2018 ITTF World Tour Grand Finals	International	Men: (Japan) Tomokazu Harimoto; Women: (China) Chen Meng
13–1 January 2019	Darts	(England) 2019 PDC World Darts Championship	International	(Netherlands) Michael van Gerwen
14–20	Nine-ball pool	(Qatar) 2018 WPA World Nine-ball Championship	International	(Germany) Joshua Filler
15	Formula E	(Saudi Arabia) Ad Diriyah ePrix (FE #1)	International	(Portugal) António Félix da Costa ( (United Kingdom) BMW i Andretti Motorsport)
26–30	Chess	(Russia) 2018 World Rapid & Blitz Chess Championships	International	Rapid (Open): (Russia) Daniil Dubov; Rapid (Women): (China) Ju Wenjun; Blitz (Open): (Norway) Magnus Carlsen; Blitz (Women): (Russia) Kateryna Lagno
26–5 January 2019	Ice hockey	(Canada) 2019 World Junior Ice Hockey Championships	International	Finland
29–6 January 2019	Cross-country skiing	(Italy) / (Switzerland) / (Germany) 2018–19 Tour de Ski	International	Men: (Norway) Johannes Høsflot Klæbo; Women: (Norway) Ingvild Flugstad Østberg
30–6 January 2019	Ski jumping	(Germany) / (Austria) 2018–19 Four Hills Tournament	International	(Japan) Ryoyu Kobayashi
