= 2017 FIL Junior European Luge Championships =

The 2017 FIL Junior European Luge Championships took place under the auspices of the International Luge Federation at Oberhof, Germany from 21 to 22 January 2017.

== Schedule ==
Four events will be held.

Date	Events
21 January	Junior doubles first run
21 January	Junior doubles second run
22 January	Junior men first run
22 January	Junior men second run
22 January	Junior women first run
22 January	Junior women second run
22 January	Team relay

== Medalists ==
Event:	Gold:	Time	Silver:	Time	Bronze:	Time
Junior men's Singles	(Germany) Max Langenhan	1:30.823	(Latvia) Kristers Aparjods	1:30.922 +0.099	(Austria) Nico Gleirscher	1:31.043 +0.220
Junior Women's Singles	(Germany) Jessica Tiebel	1:23.333	(Austria) Hannah Prock	1:23.380 +0.047	(Germany) Cheyenne Rosenthal	1:23.471 +0.138
Junior Doubles	Hannes Orlamünder; Paul Gubitz; Germany	1:17.055	Nico Semmler; Johannes Pfeiffer; Germany	1:17.179 +0.124	Ivan Nagler; Fabian Malleier; Italy	1:17.243 +0.188
Mixed Team Relay	Germany; Jessica Tiebel; Max Langenhan; Hannes Orlamünder/Paul Gubitz	2:02.713	Italy; Hannah Niederkofler; Lukas Gufler; Ivan Nagler/Fabian Malleier	2:03.615 +0.902	Latvia; Elina Ieva Vitola; Kristers Aparjods; Martins Bots/Roberts Plume	2:03.738 +1.025

== Medal table ==
Rank	Nation	Gold	Silver	Bronze	Total
1	Germany (GER)	4	1	1	6
2	Austria (AUT)	0	1	1	2
2	Italy (ITA)	0	1	1	2
2	Latvia (LAT)	0	1	1	2
Totals (4 entries)		4	4	4	12
