= Juri Gatt =

Austrian luger (born 2001)

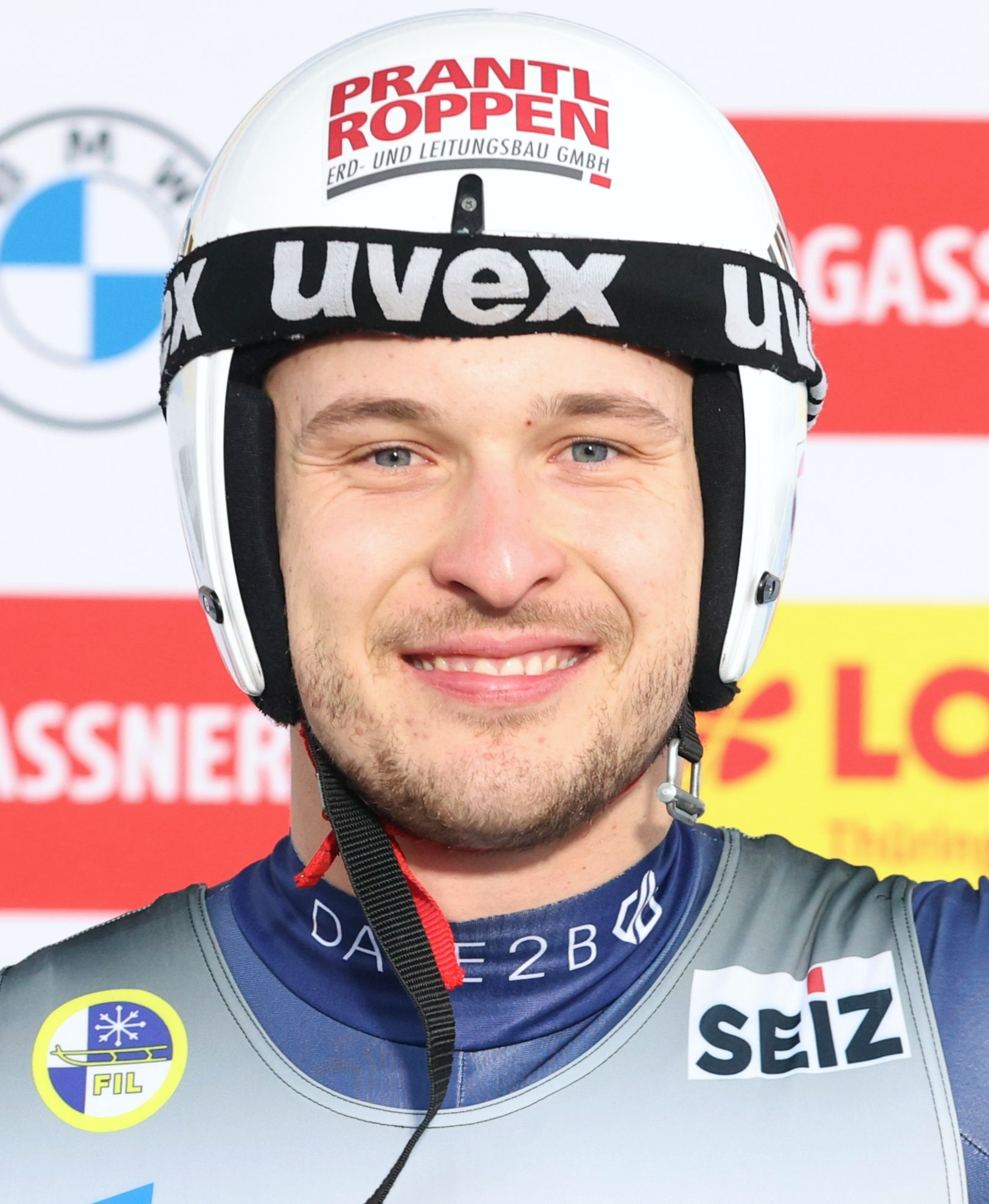
- Gatt in 2024

Personal information
- Nationality: Austrian
- Born: 9 August 2001 (age 24) Innsbruck, Austria

Sport
- Sport: Luge
Medal record
Men's luge
Representing Austria
World Championships
| Gold medal – first place | 2024 Altenberg | Doubles |
| Bronze medal – third place | 2024 Alternberg | Sprint |
European Championships
| Gold medal – first place | 2025 Winterberg | Team relay |
| Silver medal – second place | 2025 Winterberg | Doubles |
| Silver medal – second place | 2026 Oberhof | Team relay |
| Bronze medal – third place | 2026 Oberhof | Doubles |

Juri Gatt (born 9 August 2001) is an Austrian luger.

== Career ==
Gatt represented Austria at the 2016 Winter Youth Olympics and placed seventh in the doubles event, and ninth in the team relay.

He competed at the 2019 Junior World Luge Championships and won a gold medal in the team relay. He then competed at the 2020 FIL Junior European Luge Championships and won a silver medal in the team relay.

During the first race of the 2022–23 Luge World Cup on 3 December 2022, Gatt and his doubles teammate Riccardo Schöpf won their first Luge World Cup race.

He competed at the 2024 FIL World Luge Championships and won a god medal in the doubles event with a time of 1:22.924. He also won a bronze medal in the sprint event with a time of 27.973.

In January 2025, he competed at the 2025 FIL European Luge Championships, and won a gold medal in the team relay, and a silver medal in the doubles event.
