= 2020 FIL Junior European Luge Championships =

- Venue: Winterberg bobsleigh, luge, and skeleton track, Winterberg, Germany
- Dates: 31 January

The 2020 FIL Junior European Luge Championships took place under the auspices of the International Luge Federation at the Winterberg bobsleigh, luge, and skeleton track, Winterberg, Germany on 31 January 2020.

== Schedule ==
Four events were held.

Date	Events
31 January	Junior Men 1st run
31 January	Junior Men 2nd run
31 January	Junior Women 1st run
31 January	Junior Women 2nd run
31 January	Junior Doubles 1st run
31 January	Junior Doubles 2nd run
31 January	Team relay

== Medal summary ==
=== Medal table ===
* Host nation (Germany)

Rank	Nation	Gold	Silver	Bronze	Total
1	Germany (GER)*	2	1	2	5
2	Russia (RUS)	1	2	1	4
3	Italy (ITA)	1	0	0	1
4	Austria (AUT)	0	1	0	1
5	Romania (ROU)	0	0	1	1
Totals (5 entries)		4	4	4	12

=== Medalists ===
Event	Gold		Silver		Bronze	
Junior Men's singles	Pavel Repilov; Russia	1:53.896	Matvei Perestoronin; Russia	1:53.907	Florian Müller; Germany	1:54.320
Junior Women's singles	Verena Hofer; Italy	1:29.887	Jessica Degenhardt; Germany	1:29.965	Isabell Richter; Germany	1:29.986
Junior Doubles	Germany; Max Ewald; Jakob Jannusch	1:34.100	Russia; Dmitriy Buchnev; Daniil Kilseev	1:34.257	Russia; Mikhail Karnaukhov; Iurii Chirva	1:34.920
Team relay	Germany; Jessica Degenhardt; Florian Müller; Max Ewald / Jakob Jannusch	2:21.383	Austria; Barbara Allmaier; Florian Tanzer; Juri Gatt / Riccardo Schöpf	2:22.883	Romania; Corina Buzățoiu; Eduard Crăciun; Răzvan Turea / Sebastian Motzca	2:24.980
