= 2019 Junior World Luge Championships =

The 34th Junior World Luge Championships took place under the auspices of the International Luge Federation at Innsbruck, Austria from 1 to 2 February 2019.

== Schedule ==
Four events will be held.

Date	Events
2 February	Junior men first run
2 February	Junior men second run
2 February	Junior women first run
2 February	Junior women second run
3 February	Junior doubles first run
3 February	Junior doubles second run
3 February	Team relay

== Medalists ==
Event:	Gold	Time	Silver	Time	Bronze	Time
Junior Men's	Max Langenhan; Germany	1:41.403	Bastian Schulte; Austria	1:41.746	Lukas Gufler; Italy	1:41.931
Junior Women's	Cheyenne Rosenthal; Germany	1:21.364	Verena Hofer; Italy	1:21.388	Jessica Degenhardt; Germany	1:21.438
Junior Doubles	Germany; Hannes Orlamünder; Paul Gubitz	1:20.623	Russia; Dmitry Buchnev; Daniil Kilseev	1:20.830	Russia; Andrey Shander; Semen Mikov	1:21.198
Team Relay	Austria; Lisa Schulte; Bastian Schulte; Juri Gatt; Riccardo Schöpf	2:10.926	Germany; Cheyenne Rosenthal; Max Langenhan; Hannes Orlamünder; Paul Gubitz	2:10.954	Russia; Tatiana Tcvetova; Alexey Dmitriev; Dmitry Buchnev; Daniil Kilseev	2:11.174

== Medal table ==
* Host nation (Austria)

Rank	Nation	Gold	Silver	Bronze	Total
1	Germany (GER)	3	1	1	5
2	Austria (AUT)*	1	1	0	2
3	Russia (RUS)	0	1	2	3
4	Italy (ITA)	0	1	1	2
Totals (4 entries)		4	4	4	12
