= Riccardo Schöpf =

Austrian luger (born 2001)

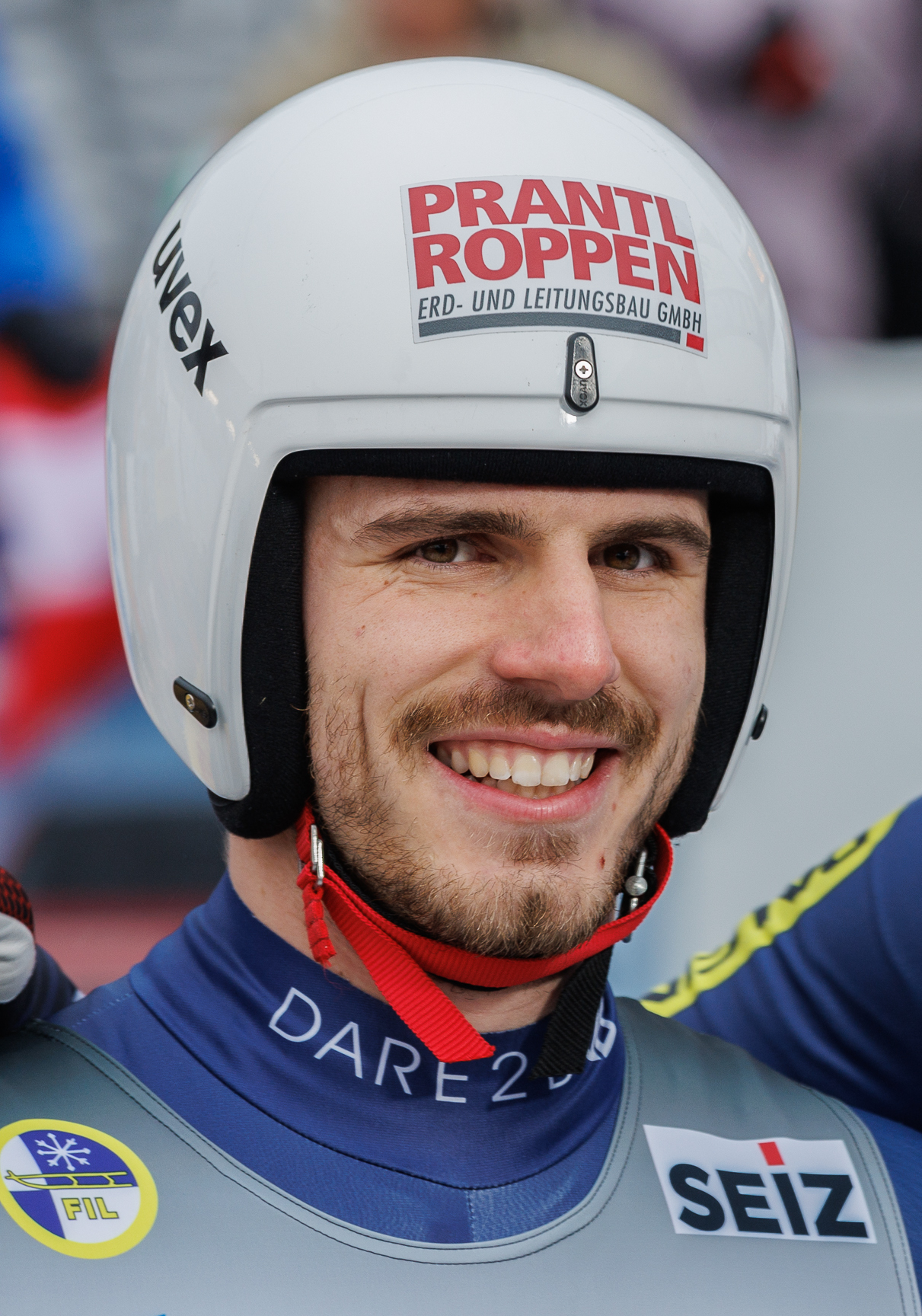
- Schöpf in 2024

Personal information
- Nationality: Austrian
- Born: 27 June 2001 (age 25) Innsbruck, Austria

Sport
- Sport: Luge
Medal record
Men's luge
Representing Austria
World Championships
Gold medal – first place	2024 Altenberg	Doubles
Bronze medal – third place	2024 Alternberg	Sprint
European Championships
Gold medal – first place	2025 Winterberg	Team relay
Silver medal – second place	2025 Winterberg	Doubles
Silver medal – second place	2026 Oberhof	Team relay
Bronze medal – third place	2026 Oberhof	Doubles

Riccardo Martin Schöpf (born 27 June 2001) is an Austrian luger.

== Career ==
Schöpf competed at the 2019 Junior World Luge Championships and won a gold medal in the team relay. He then competed at the 2020 FIL Junior European Luge Championships and won a silver medal in the team relay.

During the first race of the 2022–23 Luge World Cup on 3 December 2022, Schöpf and his doubles teammate Juri Gatt won their first Luge World Cup race.

He competed at the 2024 FIL World Luge Championships and won a god medal in the doubles event with a time of 1:22.924. He also won a bronze medal in the sprint event with a time of 27.973.

In January 2025, he competed at the 2025 FIL European Luge Championships, and won a gold medal in the team relay, and a silver medal in the doubles event.
