= 2018 Junior World Luge Championships =

The 33rd Junior World Luge Championships took place under the auspices of the International Luge Federation at Altenberg, Germany from 2 to 3 February 2018.

== Schedule ==
Four events will be held.

| Date | Events |
|---|---|
| 2 February | Junior men first run |
| 2 February | Junior men second run |
| 2 February | Junior women first run |
| 2 February | Junior women second run |
| 3 February | Junior doubles first run |
| 3 February | Junior doubles second run |
| 3 February | Team relay |

== Medalists ==
| Event: | Gold: | Time | Silver: | Time | Bronze: | Time |
|---|---|---|---|---|---|---|
| Junior Men's | (Germany) Max Langenhan | 1:43.662 | (Germany) David Nössler | 1:44.247 +0.585 | (Germany) Paul-Lukas Heider | 1:44.349 +0.687 |
| Junior Women's | (Germany) Jessica Tiebel | 1:23.951 | (Russia) Tatiana Tcvetova | 1:24.373 +0.422 | (Germany) Jessica Degenhardt | 1:24.385 +0.434 |
| Junior Doubles | Ivan Nagler; Fabian Malleier; Italy | 1:21.285 | Hannes Orlamünder; Paul Gubitz; Germany | 1:21.500 +0.215 | Vsevolod Kashkin; Konstantin Korshunov; Russia | 1:21.679 +0.394 |
| Team Relay | Germany; Max Langenhan; Jessica Tiebel; Hannes Orlamünder/Paul Gubitz | 2:15.921 | Russia; Danil Lebedev; Tatiana Tcvetova; Vsevolod Kashkin/Konstantin Korshunov | 2:16.874 +0.953 | Italy; Leon Felderer; Verena Hofer; Ivan Nagler/Fabian Malleier | 2:16.972 +1.051 |

== Medal table ==
| Rank | Nation | Gold | Silver | Bronze | Total |
|---|---|---|---|---|---|
| 1 | Germany (GER) | 3 | 2 | 2 | 7 |
| 2 | Italy (ITA) | 1 | 0 | 1 | 2 |
| 3 | Russia (RUS) | 0 | 2 | 1 | 3 |
| Totals (3 entries) | | 4 | 4 | 4 | 12 |
