= Paul Gubitz =

German luger (born 1999)

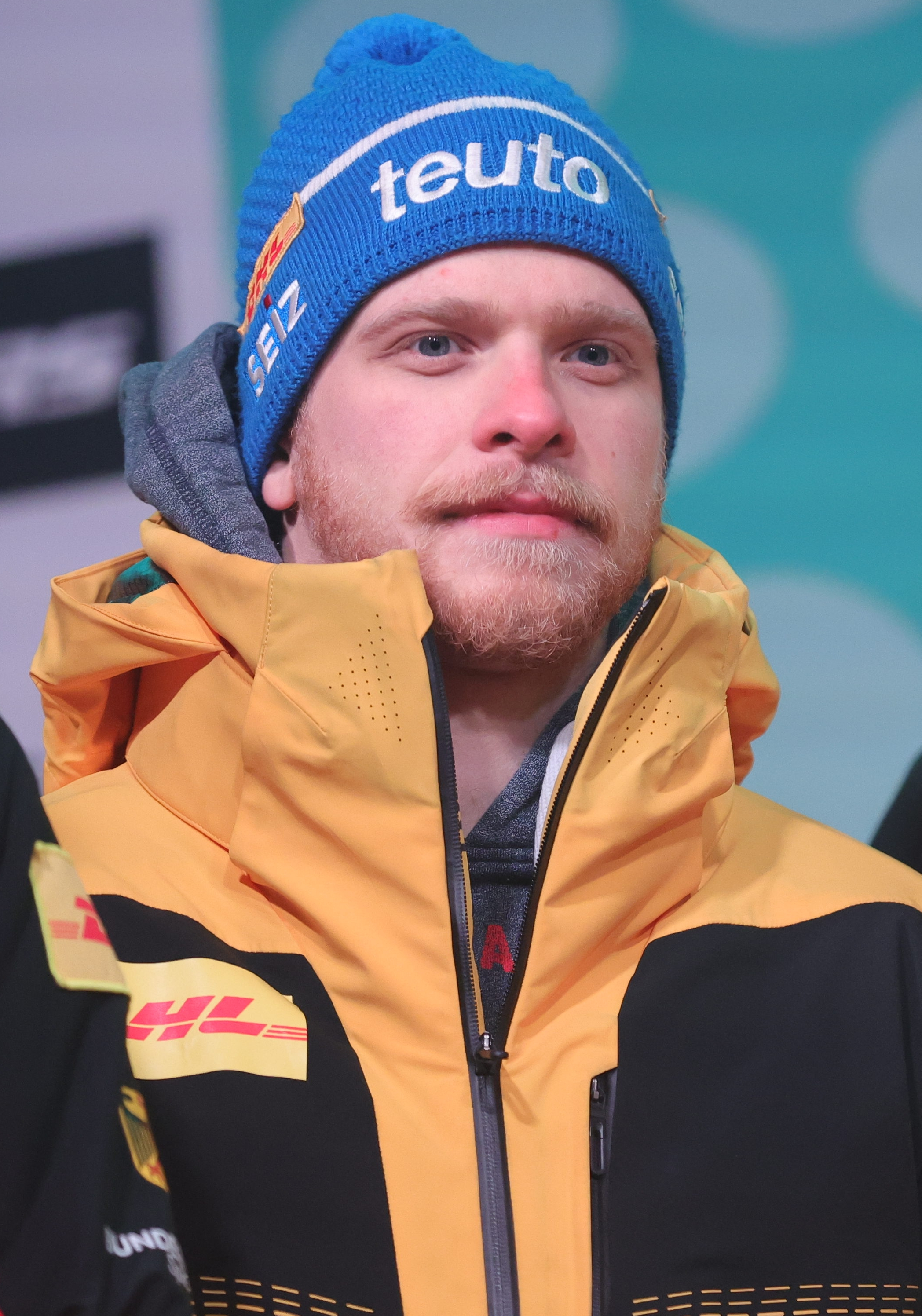
- Gubitz in 2024

Personal information
- Nationality: German
- Born: 23 May 1999 (age 27)

Sport
- Sport: Luge
Medal record
Men's luge
Representing Germany
World Championships
| Gold medal – first place | 2025 Whistler | Doubles |
| Gold medal – first place | 2025 Whistler | Team relay |
| Silver medal – second place | 2025 Whistler | Mixed doubles |
Junior World Championships
| Gold medal – first place | 2018 Altenberg | Team relay |
| Gold medal – first place | 2019 Innsbruck | Doubles |
| Silver medal – second place | 2018 Altenberg | Doubles |
| Silver medal – second place | 2019 Innsbruck | Team relay |
Winter Youth Olympic Games
| Gold medal – first place | 2016 Lillehammer | Team relay |
| Silver medal – second place | 2016 Lillehammer | Doubles |

Paul Constantin Gubitz (born 23 May 1999) is a German luger.

== Career ==
Gubitz and his doubles teammate, Hannes Orlamünder, have been a luge duo since 2011. He competed at the 2016 Winter Youth Olympics and won a gold medal in the team relay and a silver medal in the doubles event.

He competed at the 2018 Junior World Luge Championships and won a gold medal in the team relay and a silver medal in the doubles event. He again competed at the 2019 Junior World Luge Championships and won a gold medal in the doubles event and a silver medal in the team relay.

He represented Germany at the 2025 FIL World Luge Championships and won a silver medal in the inaugural mixed doubles event at the FIL World Luge Championships with a time of 1:22.912 on the first day of the competition. He also won gold medals in the doubles and team relay events.
