= 2018 FIL Junior European Luge Championships =

The 2018 FIL Junior European Luge Championships took place under the auspices of the International Luge Federation at Winterberg, Germany from 20 to 21 January 2018.

== Schedule ==
Four events were held.

Date	Events
21 January	Junior doubles first run
21 January	Junior doubles second run
22 January	Junior men first run
22 January	Junior men second run
22 January	Junior women first run
22 January	Junior women second run
22 January	Team relay

== Medalists ==
Event:	Gold:	Time	Silver:	Time	Bronze:	Time
Junior Men's	(Germany) Max Langenhan	1:52.642	(Germany) Moritz Bollmann	1:53.122 +0.480	(Germany) David Nössler	1:53.135 +0.493
Junior Women's	(Germany) Cheyenne Rosenthal	1:28.306	(Germany) Jessica Tiebel	1:28.338 +0.032	(Italy) Verena Hofer	1:28.455 +0.149
Junior Doubles	Dmitriy Buchnev; Daniil Kilseev; Russia	1:27.251	Vsevolod Kashkin; Konstantin Korshunov; Russia	1:27.283 +0.032	Marian Gâtlan; Flavius Crăciun; Romania	1:27.441 +0.190
Mixed Team Relay	Germany; Cheyenne Rosenthal; Max Langenhan; Hendrik Seibert/Calvin Luke Meister	2:11.229	Italy; Verena Hofer; Leon Felderer; Felix Schwarz/Lukas Gufler	2:11.906 +0.677	Russia; Kristina Shamova; Danil Lebedev; Dmitriy Buchnev/Daniil Kilseev	2:11.959 +0.730

== Medal table ==
Rank	Nation	Gold	Silver	Bronze	Total
1	Germany (GER)	3	2	1	6
2	Russia (RUS)	1	1	1	3
3	Italy (ITA)	0	1	1	2
4	Romania (ROM)	0	0	1	1
Totals (4 entries)		4	4	4	12
