= Hannes Orlamünder =

German luger (born 1999)

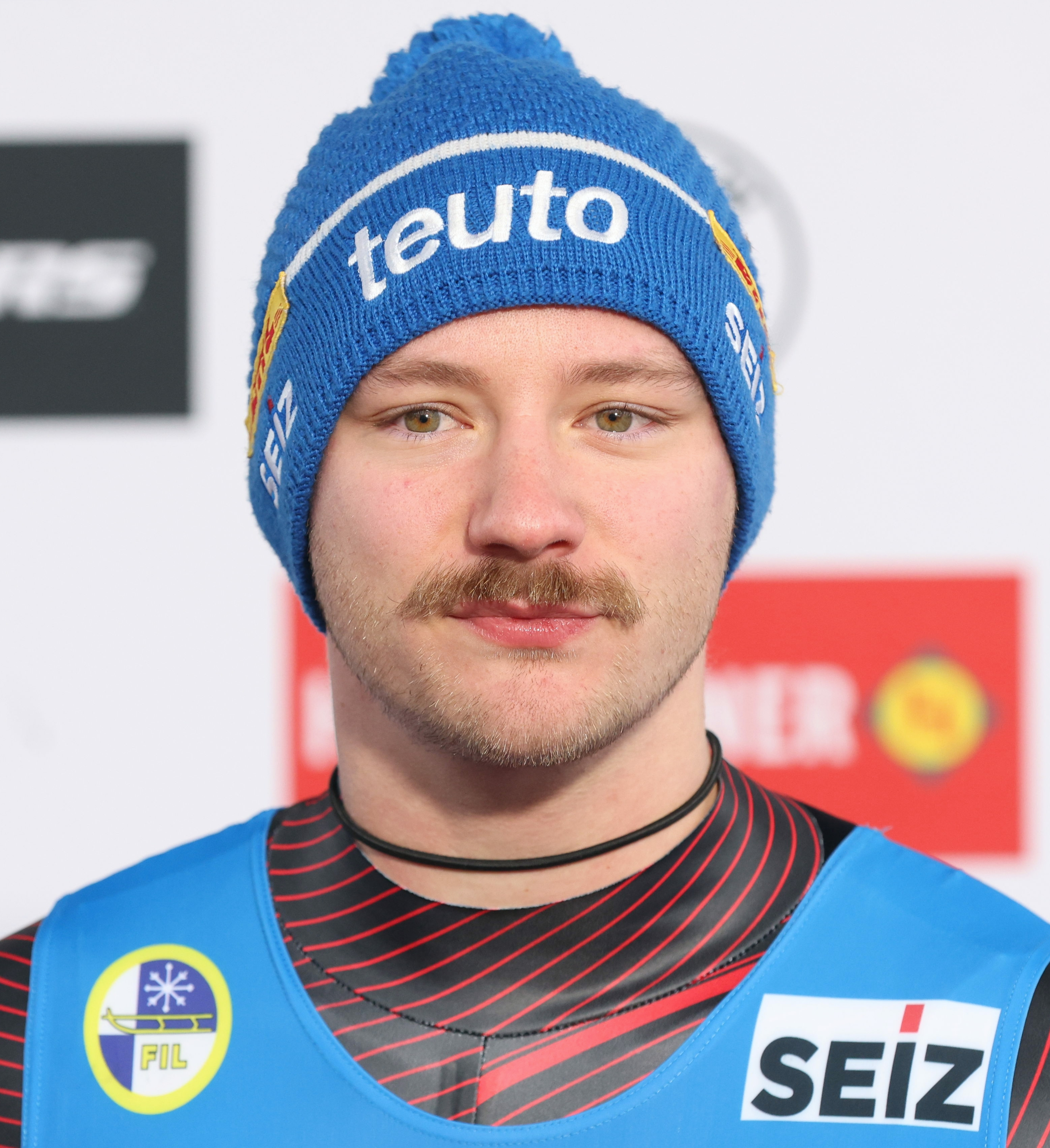
- Orlamünder in 2024

Personal information
- Nationality: German
- Born: 24 July 1999 (age 26)

Sport
- Sport: Luge
Medal record
Men's luge
Representing Germany
World Championships
Gold medal – first place	2025 Whistler	Doubles
Gold medal – first place	2025 Whistler	Team relay
Silver medal – second place	2025 Whistler	Mixed doubles
Junior World Championships
Gold medal – first place	2018 Altenberg	Team relay
Gold medal – first place	2019 Innsbruck	Doubles
Silver medal – second place	2018 Altenberg	Doubles
Silver medal – second place	2019 Innsbruck	Team relay
Winter Youth Olympic Games
Gold medal – first place	2016 Lillehammer	Mixed team
Silver medal – second place	2016 Lillehammer	Doubles

Hannes Orlamünder (born 24 July 1999) is a German luger.

== Career ==
Orlamünder and his doubles teammate, Paul Gubitz, have been a luge duo since 2011. He competed at the 2016 Winter Youth Olympics and won a gold medal in the team relay and a silver medal in the doubles event.

He competed at the 2018 Junior World Luge Championships and won a gold medal in the team relay and a silver medal in the doubles event. He again competed at the 2019 Junior World Luge Championships and won a gold medal in the doubles event and a silver medal in the team relay.

He represented Germany at the 2025 FIL World Luge Championships and won a silver medal in the inaugural mixed doubles event at the FIL World Luge Championships with a time of 1:22.912 on the first day of the competition. He also won gold medals in the doubles and team relay events.
