= 2019 FIL World Luge Championships – Women's sprint =

Women's sprint at the 2019 FIL World Luge Championships
- Venue: Winterberg bobsleigh, luge, and skeleton track
- Location: Winterberg, Germany
- Dates: 25 January 2019
- Competitors: 37 from 17 nations
- Winning time: 38.628

Medalists
gold medal	Natalie Geisenberger	Germany
silver medal	Julia Taubitz	Germany
bronze medal	Dajana Eitberger	Germany

2019 FIL World Luge Championships
Individual	men		women
Doubles	doubles
Sprint	men	doubles	women
Relay		mixed

The Women's sprint competition at the 2019 FIL World Luge Championships was held on 25 January 2019.

== Results ==
The qualification was held at 10:10 and the final at 14:36.

Rank	Bib	Name	Country	Qualification		Final	
Rank	Bib	Name	Country	Time	Rank	Time	Diff
1st place, gold medalist(s)	15	Natalie Geisenberger	Germany	38.498	2	38.628	
2nd place, silver medalist(s)	14	Julia Taubitz	Germany	38.416	1	38.635	+0.007
3rd place, bronze medalist(s)	11	Dajana Eitberger	Germany	38.533	4	38.668	+0.040
4	7	Emily Sweeney	United States	38.529	3	38.747	+0.119
5	9	Tatjana Hüfner	Germany	38.806	14	38.794	+0.166
6	6	Ekaterina Baturina	Russia	38.653	8	38.801	+0.173
7	12	Tatiana Ivanova	Russia	38.534	5	38.819	+0.191
8	13	Summer Britcher	United States	38.650	7	38.896	+0.268
9	8	Elīza Cauce	Latvia	38.856	15	39.050	+0.422
10	2	Ulla Zirne	Latvia	38.782	12	39.065	+0.437
11	4	Kendija Aparjode	Latvia	38.754	11	39.237	+0.609
12	10	Andrea Vötter	Italy	38.673	9	39.250	+0.622
13	3	Madeleine Egle	Austria	38.795	13	39.253	+0.625
14	24	Hannah Prock	Austria	38.702	10	39.562	+0.934
15	16	Sandra Robatscher	Italy	38.558	6	DSQ	
16	19	Viktoriia Demchenko	Russia	38.885	16		
17	27	Lisa Schulte	Austria	38.904	17		
18	18	Kimberley McRae	Canada	38.920	18		
19	1	Birgit Platzer	Austria	38.934	19		
20	17	Raluca Strămăturaru	Romania	38.969	20		
21	23	Verónica María Ravenna	Argentina	39.099	21		
21	20	Natalie Maag	Switzerland	39.099	21		
23	5	Ekaterina Katnikova	Russia	39.111	23		
24	22	Aileen Frisch	South Korea	39.181	24		
25	37	Trinity Ellis	Canada	39.224	25		
26	30	Katarína Šimoňáková	Slovakia	39.342	26		
27	28	Klaudia Domaradzka	Poland	39.387	27		
28	29	Ewa Kuls-Kusyk	Poland	39.401	28		
29	26	Natalia Wojtuściszyn	Poland	39.435	29		
30	21	Olena Stetskiv	Ukraine	39.582	30		
31	31	Mihaela-Carmen Manolescu	Romania	39.862	31		
32	36	Danielle Scott	Great Britain	40.028	32		
33	32	Daria Obratov	Netherlands	40.182	33		
34	35	Elsa Desmond	Great Britain	40.228	34		
35	34	Lin Sin-rong	Chinese Taipei	40.238	35		
36	33	Dania Obratov	Netherlands	40.586	36		
37	25	Jung Hye-sun	South Korea	41.048	37		
