= 2019 FIL World Luge Championships – Women's singles =

Women's singles at the 2019 FIL World Luge Championships
- Venue: Winterberg bobsleigh, luge, and skeleton track
- Location: Winterberg, Germany
- Dates: 26 January
- Competitors: 37 from 17 nations
- Winning time: 1:53.868

Medalists
gold medal	Natalie Geisenberger	Germany
silver medal	Julia Taubitz	Germany
bronze medal	Emily Sweeney	United States

2019 FIL World Luge Championships
Individual	men		women
Doubles	doubles
Sprint	men	doubles	women
Relay		mixed

The Women's singles competition at the 2019 FIL World Luge Championships was held on 26 January 2019.

== Results ==
The first run was held at 14:23 and the second run at 16:20.

Rank	Bib	Name	Country	Run 1	Rank	Run 2	Rank	Total	Diff
1st place, gold medalist(s)	3	Natalie Geisenberger	Germany	57.142	1	56.726	1	1:53.868	
2nd place, silver medalist(s)	5	Julia Taubitz	Germany	57.348	2	56.945	4	1:54.293	+0.425
3rd place, bronze medalist(s)	16	Emily Sweeney	United States	57.467	4	56.914	2	1:54.381	+0.513
4	6	Tatiana Ivanova	Russia	57.492	5	56.932	3	1:54.424	+0.556
5	1	Summer Britcher	United States	57.408	3	57.029	6	1:54.437	+0.569
6	10	Ulla Zirne	Latvia	57.545	7	57.088	7	1:54.633	+0.765
7	11	Andrea Vötter	Italy	57.551	8	57.101	8	1:54.652	+0.784
8	18	Ekaterina Baturina	Russia	57.559	9	57.103	9	1:54.662	+0.794
9	14	Sandra Robatscher	Italy	57.657	10	57.016	5	1:54.673	+0.805
10	9	Tatjana Hüfner	Germany	57.502	6	57.274	13	1:54.766	+0.908
11	4	Elīza Cauce	Latvia	57.713	12	57.124	11	1:54.837	+0.969
12	2	Dajana Eitberger	Germany	57.749	13	57.106	10	1:54.855	+0.987
13	15	Viktoriia Demchenko	Russia	57.751	14	57.155	12	1:54.906	+1.038
14	17	Kimberley McRae	Canada	57.671	11	57.418	16	1:55.089	+1.221
15	12	Ekaterina Katnikova	Russia	57.781	15	57.503	18	1:55.284	+1.416
16	13	Raluca Strămăturaru	Romania	57.910	17	57.395	14	1:55.305	+1.437
17	19	Hannah Prock	Austria	57.978	18	57.438	17	1:55.416	+1.548
18	22	Natalie Maag	Switzerland	58.157	20	57.410	15	1:55.567	+1.699
19	20	Birgit Platzer	Austria	58.087	19	57.540	19	1:55.627	+1.759
20	21	Lisa Schulte	Austria	57.891	16	59.038	20	1:56.929	+3.061
21	23	Olena Stetskiv	Ukraine	58.333	21	did not advance			
22	24	Aileen Frisch	South Korea	58.388	22	did not advance			
23	26	Katarína Šimoňáková	Slovakia	58.352	23	did not advance			
24	27	Verónica María Ravenna	Argentina	58.411	24	did not advance			
25	28	Ewa Kuls-Kusyk	Poland	58.539	25	did not advance			
26	30	Natalia Wojtuściszyn	Poland	58.572	26	did not advance			
27	29	Klaudia Domaradzka	Poland	58.754	27	did not advance			
28	33	Mihaela-Carmen Manolescu	Romania	59.019	28	did not advance			
29	25	Trinity Ellis	Canada	59.325	29	did not advance			
30	34	Elsa Desmond	Great Britain	59.398	30	did not advance			
31	32	Danielle Scott	Great Britain	59.456	31	did not advance			
32	37	Lin Sin-rong	Chinese Taipei	59.481	32	did not advance			
33	35	Daria Obratov	Netherlands	59.632	33	did not advance			
34	36	Dania Obratov	Netherlands	1:00.523	34	did not advance			
35	8	Madeleine Egle	Austria	1:01.884	35	did not advance			
—	7	Kendija Aparjode	Latvia	did not finish					
—	31	Jung Hye-sun	South Korea	did not finish					
