= 2021 FIL World Luge Championships – Women's singles =

Women's singles at the 2021 FIL World Luge Championships
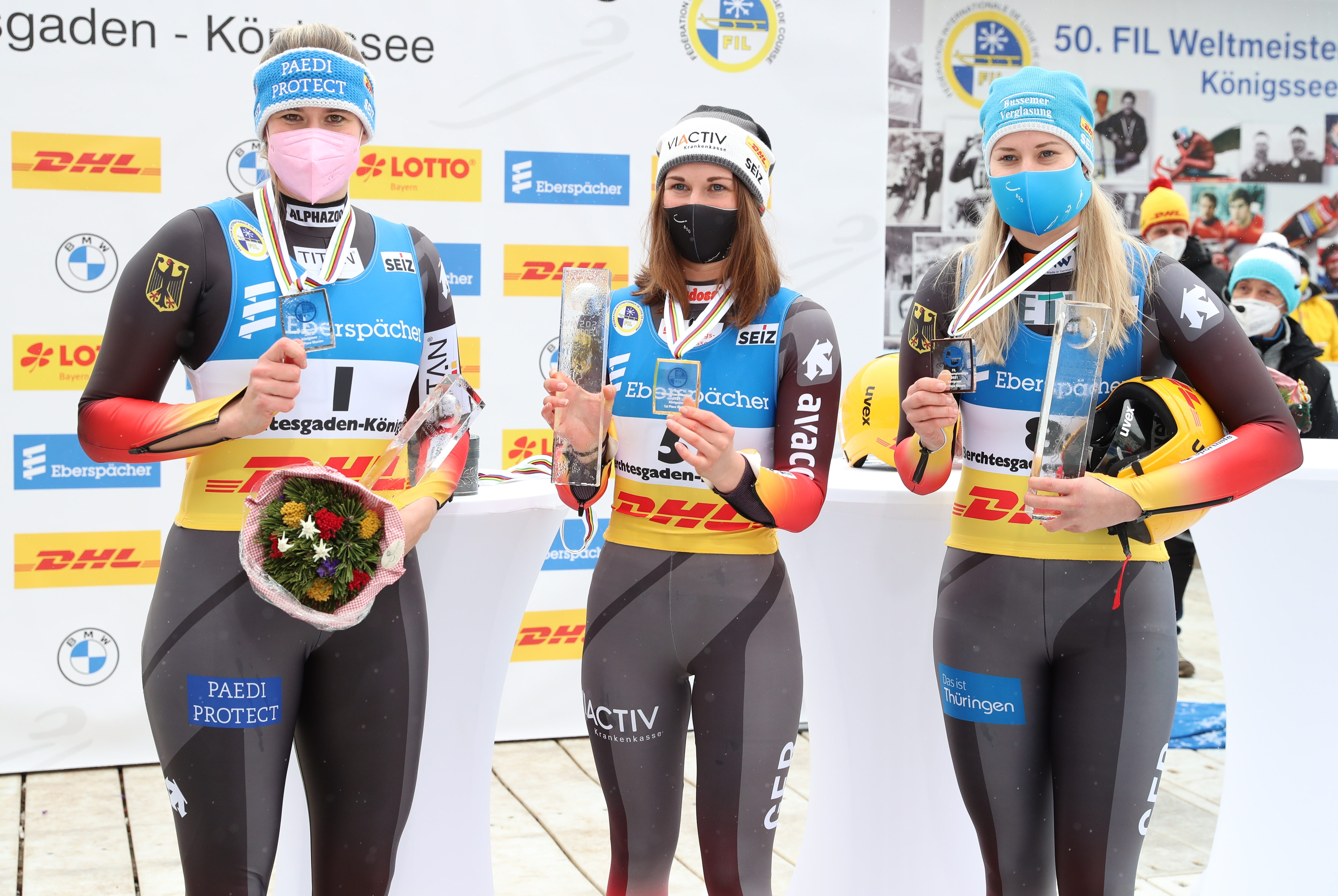
- Women's at the FIL World Luge Championships Königssee 2021 by Sandro Halank
- Venue: Königssee bobsleigh, luge, and skeleton track
- Location: Königssee, Germany
- Dates: 31 January
- Competitors: 45 from 20 nations
- Winning time: 1:41.132

Medalists
gold medal	Julia Taubitz	Germany
silver medal	Natalie Geisenberger	Germany
bronze medal	Dajana Eitberger	Germany

The Women's singles competition at the 2021 FIL World Luge Championships was held on 31 January 2021.

== Results ==
The first run was started at 10:00 and the final run at 11:50.

Rank	Bib	Name	Country	Run 1	Rank	Run 2	Rank	Total	Diff
1st place, gold medalist(s)	5	Julia Taubitz	Germany	50.417	1	50.715	1	1:41.132	
2nd place, silver medalist(s)	1	Natalie Geisenberger	Germany	50.629	2	50.818	2	1:41.447	+0.315
3rd place, bronze medalist(s)	8	Dajana Eitberger	Germany	50.760	3	50.844	3	1:41.604	+0.472
4	13	Anna Berreiter	Germany	50.908	4	51.062	4	1:41.970	+0.838
5	2	Tatiana Ivanova	Russian Luge Federation	50.947	5	51.230	7	1:42.177	+1.045
6	4	Summer Britcher	United States	50.965	7	51.318	8	1:42.283	+1.151
7	18	Emily Sweeney	United States	51.072	9	51.219	6	1:42.291	+1.159
8	14	Kendija Aparjode	Latvia	51.212	13	51.212	5	1:42.424	+1.292
9	10	Elīza Tīruma	Latvia	51.131	10	51.334	9	1:42.465	+1.333
10	12	Ekaterina Katnikova	Russian Luge Federation	51.062	8	51.433	11	1:42.495	+1.363
11	21	Lisa Schulte	Austria	51.159	11	51.430	10	1:42.589	+1.457
12	11	Ashley Farquharson	United States	51.169	12	51.537	14	1:42.706	+1.574
13	7	Ulla Zirne	Latvia	51.265	14	51.443	13	1:42.708	+1.576
14	16	Hannah Prock	Austria	51.297	15	51.434	12	1:42.731	+1.599
15	6	Madeleine Egle	Austria	50.950	6	51.959	20	1:42.909	+1.777
16	24	Elīna Ieva Vītola	Latvia	51.368	16	51.552	15	1:42.920	+1.788
17	19	Natalie Maag	Switzerland	51.376	17	51.625	17	1:43.001	+1.869
18	15	Ekaterina Baturina	Russian Luge Federation	51.468	19	51.558	16	1:43.026	+1.894
19	20	Brittney Arndt	United States	51.437	18	51.647	18	1:43.084	+1.952
20	25	Carolyn Maxwell	Canada	51.493	20	51.726	19	1:43.219	+2.087
21	22	Selina Egle	Austria	51.514	21	Did not advance			
22	23	Verena Hofer	Italy	51.624	22	Did not advance			
23	17	Marion Oberhofer	Italy	51.644	23	Did not advance			
24	9	Andrea Vötter	Italy	51.775	24	Did not advance			
25	27	Olena Stetskiv	Ukraine	51.777	25	Did not advance			
26	29	Verónica María Ravenna	Argentina	51.853	26	Did not advance			
27	26	Raluca Strămăturaru	Romania	51.955	27	Did not advance			
28	28	Aileen Frisch	South Korea	51.970	28	Did not advance			
29	31	Klaudia Domaradzka	Poland	52.001	29	Did not advance			
30	30	Yulianna Tunytska	Ukraine	52.423	30	Did not advance			
31	32	Katarína Šimoňáková	Slovakia	52.455	31	Did not advance			
32	37	Tove Kohala	Sweden	52.540	32	Did not advance			
33	44	Detelina Marinova	Bulgaria	52.705	33	Did not advance			
34	39	Anna Bryk	Poland	53.156	34	Did not advance			
35	41	Cezara Curmei	Romania	53.310	35	Did not advance			
36	38	Natalia Jamróz	Poland	53.427	36	Did not advance			
37	36	Mihaela Manolescu	Romania	53.453	37	Did not advance			
38	42	Daria Obratov	Netherlands	53.541	38	Did not advance			
39	33	Jung Hye-sun	South Korea	53.634	39	Did not advance			
40	40	Elsa Desmond	Ireland	54.097	40	Did not advance			
41	43	Doina Descalui	Moldova	54.864	41	Did not advance			
42	45	Lin Sin-rong	Chinese Taipei	55.734	42	Did not advance			
43	35	Ioana Buzățoiu	Romania	56.450	43	Did not advance			
	3	Victoria Demchenko	Russian Luge Federation	did not finish					
	34	Olena Smaha	Ukraine	did not finish					
