= 2021 FIL European Luge Championships – Women's singles =

Women's singles at the 2021 FIL European Luge Championships
- Venue: Sigulda bobsleigh, luge, and skeleton track
- Location: Sigulda, Latvia
- Dates: 10 January
- Winning time: 1:23.594

Medalists
gold medal	Tatiana Ivanova	Russia
silver medal	Natalie Geisenberger	Germany
bronze medal	Victoria Demchenko	Russia

The women's singles competition at the 2021 FIL European Luge Championships was held on 10 January 2021.

== Results ==
The first run was held at 10:33 and the second run at 11:55.

Rank	Bib	Name	Country	Run 1	Rank	Run 2	Rank	Total	Diff
1st place, gold medalist(s)	23	Tatiana Ivanova	Russia	41.834	2	41.760	1	1:23.594	
2nd place, silver medalist(s)	26	Natalie Geisenberger	Germany	41.829	1	41.817	2	1:23.646	+0.052
3rd place, bronze medalist(s)	18	Victoria Demchenko	Russia	41.882	3	41.873	3	1:23.755	+0.161
4	28	Julia Taubitz	Germany	41.968	4	41.936	4	1:23.904	+0.310
5	15	Elīna Ieva Vītola	Latvia	42.005	5	41.989	5	1:23.994	+0.400
6	27	Elīza Tīruma	Latvia	42.014	6	42.011	6	1:24.025	+0.431
7	16	Ulla Zirne	Latvia	42.029	8	42.034	7	1:24.063	+0.469
8	17	Ekaterina Katnikova	Russia	42.035	9	42.045	8	1:24.080	+0.486
9	25	Madeleine Egle	Austria	42.022	7	42.092	9	1:24.114	+0.520
10	24	Dajana Eitberger	Germany	42.141	10	42.152	10	1:24.293	+0.699
11	22	Andrea Vötter	Italy	42.190	11	42.172	11	1:24.362	+0.768
12	11	Yulianna Tunytska	Ukraine	42.343	13	42.361	14	1:24.704	+1.110
13	13	Olena Stetskiv	Ukraine	42.370	14	42.356	13	1:24.726	+1.132
14	19	Anna Berreiter	Germany	42.397	15	42.412	15	1:24.809	+1.215
15	4	Verena Hofer	Italy	42.449	16	42.416	16	1:24.865	+1.271
16	10	Natalie Maag	Switzerland	42.598	17	42.283	12	1:24.881	+1.287
17	21	Lisa Schulte	Austria	42.324	12	42.593	19	1:24.917	+1.323
18	8	Ekaterina Baturina	Russia	42.608	18	42.421	17	1:25.029	+1.435
19	9	Katarína Šimoňáková	Slovakia	42.620	19	42.558	18	1:25.178	+1.584
20	6	Nina Zöggeler	Italy	42.716	20	43.083	21	1:25.799	+2.205
21	2	Tove Kohala	Sweden	44.057	22	42.961	20	1:27.018	+3.424
22		Olena Smaha	Ukraine	Did not qualify via Nationscup					
23		Natalia Jamróz	Poland	Did not qualify via Nationscup					
24		Anna Bryk	Poland	Did not qualify via Nationscup					
25		Hannah Prock	Austria	Did not qualify via Nationscup					
26		Detelina Marinova	Bulgaria	Did not qualify via Nationscup					
27		Elsa Desmond	Ireland	Did not qualify via Nationscup					
28		Doina Descalui	Moldova	Did not qualify via Nationscup					
29		Dania Obratov	Netherlands	Did not qualify via Nationscup					
30		Daria Obratov	Netherlands	Did not qualify via Nationscup					
	3	Klaudia Domaradzka	Poland	42.923	21	Did not finish			
	20	Kendija Aparjode	Latvia	Did not finish					
