= Julia Taubitz =

German luger (born 1996)

- Taubitz in 2026

Personal information
- Nationality: German
- Born: 1 March 1996 (age 30) Annaberg-Buchholz, Germany
- Height: 1.75 m (5 ft 9 in)
- Weight: 63 kg (139 lb)

Sport
- Country: Germany
- Sport: Luge
- Event: Singles
- Club: WSC Erzgebirge Oberwiesenthal
Medal record
Women's luge
Representing Germany
Olympic Games
Gold medal – first place	2026 Milano Cortina	Singles
Gold medal – first place	2026 Milano Cortina	Team relay
World Championships
Gold medal – first place	2020 Sochi	Team relay
Gold medal – first place	2021 Königssee	Singles
Gold medal – first place	2021 Königssee	Sprint
Gold medal – first place	2024 Alternberg	Sprint
Gold medal – first place	2024 Altenberg	Team relay
Gold medal – first place	2025 Whistler	Singles
Gold medal – first place	2025 Whistler	Mixed singles
Gold medal – first place	2025 Whistler	Team relay
Silver medal – second place	2019 Winterberg	Singles
Silver medal – second place	2019 Winterberg	Sprint
Silver medal – second place	2020 Sochi	Singles
Silver medal – second place	2021 Königssee	Team relay
Silver medal – second place	2023 Oberhof	Singles
Silver medal – second place	2023 Oberhof	Sprint
Silver medal – second place	2024 Altenberg	Singles
European Championships
Gold medal – first place	2025 Winterberg	Singles
Gold medal – first place	2026 Oberhof	Mixed singles
Silver medal – second place	2020 Lillehammer	Singles
Silver medal – second place	2024 Igls	Singles
Silver medal – second place	2024 Igls	Team relay
Silver medal – second place	2025 Winterberg	Team relay
World Cup
Event	1st	2nd	3rd
Singles	21	18	14
Sprint	11	2	2
Team relay	8	6	1
Mixed singles	2	3	1
Total	42	29	18
- Updated as of 8 March 2026

Julia Taubitz (born 1 March 1996) is a German luger. She is the 2026 Winter Olympic champion in women's singles and the team relay, an eight-time World champion, and two-time European champion.

== Career ==
She made her debut in the Luge World Cup at the age of 19 on November 28, 2015 on the Olympia Eiskanal Igls, where she won the bronze medal at the 2014 Junior World Championships. In her first World Cup races, she finished 18th. On January 16, 2016, she finished ninth on the Oberhof luge track, a top 10 result for the first time. She was the fourth German starter for the Luge World Championships 2016 on the artificial ice track in Königsseequalify and reached sixth place on January 29, 2016 in the sprint competition, which was held for the first time. A day later she reached sixth place again in the actual World Championship race for women and was thus the official U-23 world champion ahead of the American Summer Britcher and Russia's Victoria Demchenko. On February 6, Julia Taubitz also won gold at the Junior World Championships held at Winterberg.

In the 2016/17 World Cup, she also qualified for the Luge World Championships on the Olympia Eiskanal Igls. With an eighth place in the women's race, she secured the silver medal in the U-23 area behind Summer Britcher and ahead of Victoria Demchenko. In the pre-Olympic season, Julia Taubitz was able to achieve a podium finish for the first time in the Olympic Sliding Centre in Pyeongchang. She took third place behind Tatiana Ivanova and Natalie Geisenberger.

In the Olympic season on January 20, 2018 in Lillehammer, she again took third place behind Summer Britcher and Natalie Geisenberger. She missed qualifying for the 2018 Winter Olympics as the fourth best German in the World Cup.

After missing the Olympic qualification, she started the 2018/19 World Cup with two second places. Both in the normal competition and in the sprint competition, she took second place on the Olympia Eiskanal Igls behind the Olympic champion Natalie Geisenberger. In Whistler, too, she took second place behind Geisenberger. In Calgary, Taubitz won her first World Cup races on the bobsleigh and luge track in Canada Olympic Park both in singles ahead of Geisenberger and in the relay with Felix Loch, Tobias Wendl and Tobias Arlt. Taubitz won her second individual World Cup victory in heavy snowfall and difficult conditions in Koenigssee in Schoenau. She also took first place in the team relay with Sebastian Bley, Toni Eggert and Sascha Benecken. At the 2019 World Championships in Winterberg, she won a silver medal in both the sprint and the individual competition.

After the resignation of Tatjana Hüfner and the pregnancies of Natalie Geisenberger and Dajana Eitberger, Taubitz was considered the best-performing member of an almost completely newly assembled German women's team from the 2019/20 season. From the beginning she was able to live up to her new responsibility and fought with the Russian Tatiana Ivanova for victory in the overall World Cup. In Lake Placid, Altenberg and Sigulda she won her World Cup races three to five, and she also won her first two sprint races in Lake Placid and Sigulda. At the 2020 European Championships in Lillehammer, she won the silver medal behind Tatiana Ivanova and ahead of Victoria Demchenko. At the 2020 World Championships in Sochi, she was only beaten by the local hero Ekaterina Katnikova and, like last year, won the silver medal. In the final race with the team relay, Taubitz won her first world championship title alongside Johannes Ludwig and the double Eggert/Benecken. In the last race of the season in Königssee, she took second place behind Anna Berreiter, while Ivanova only finished sixth. She was able to celebrate her first victory in the overall World Cup.

At the start of the 2020/21 season, Taubitz achieved something historic. Despite the return of Geisenberger and Eitberger with extremely strong performances in the World Cup, Taubitz maintained her leadership role in the team. At the first race weekend in Igls, she was able to win three races in one day – the classic individual race, the race in the team relay (with Felix Loch, who also won all three races of the weekend and the doubles Eggert/Benecken) and the sprint race. Although she was not able to repeat the victory in the overall World Cup from the previous season, she achieved a good second place with six wins this season. In addition, their strong performances were rewarded with two gold and one silver medal at the 2021 World Championships in Königssee.

She competed at the 2024 FIL World Luge Championships and won gold medals in the sprint event and the team relay.

At the 2026 Winter Olympics, Taubitz won gold medals in both the Women's singles event and the team relay.

== Luge results ==
All results are sourced from the International Luge Federation (FIL) and German Bobsleigh, Luge and Skeleton Federation (BSD).

=== Olympic Games ===
Event	Age	Singles	Team relay
(China) 2022 Beijing	25	7th	—
(Italy) 2026 Milano Cortina	29	Gold	Gold

=== World Championships ===
- 15 medals – (8 gold, 7 silver)

Year	Age	Singles	Sprint	Team relay	Mixed singles
(Germany) 2016 Königssee	19	6th	6th	—	
(Austria) 2017 Innsbruck	20	8th	12th	—	
(Germany) 2019 Winterberg	22	Silver	Silver	—	
(Russia) 2020 Sochi	23	Silver	4th	Gold	
(Germany) 2021 Königssee	24	Gold	Gold	Silver	
(Germany) 2023 Oberhof	26	Silver	Silver	—	
(Germany) 2024 Altenberg	27	Silver	Gold	Gold	
(Canada) 2025 Whistler	28	Gold	—N/a	Gold	Gold

=== World Cup ===
Season	Singles									Sprint				Team relay						Mixed singles			Points	Overall	Singles	Sprint
Season	1	2	3	4	5	6	7	8	9	1	2	3	4	1	2	3	4	5	6	1	2	3	Points	Overall	Singles	Sprint
2015–16	18	11	13	17	16	9	–	6	–	14	–	13	N/A	–	–	–	–	–	–	—N/a			309	15th	—N/a	NC
2016–17	13	8	13	15	13	26	13	3	7	9	14	–	N/A	–	–	–	–	–	–	—N/a			376	12th	—N/a	NC
2017–18	5	5	6	11	DNF	DSQ	–	3	7	5	–	4	12	–	–	–	–	–	–	—N/a			473	8th	—N/a	NC
2018–19	2	2	1	3	1	9	24	5	5	2	3	12	N/A	–	1	1	–	–	–	—N/a			793	2nd	—N/a	4th
2019–20	3	1	4	1	3	1	4	3	2	1	6	1	N/A	3	2	4	–	–	–	—N/a			965	1st	—N/a	1st
2020–21	1	5	10	1	1	4	5	2	2	1	1	1	N/A	1	–	–	2	–	CNX	—N/a			976	2nd	2nd	1st
2021–22	2	9	1	2	1	1	2	2	4	1	2	5	N/A	7	–	1	4	1	–	—N/a			979	1st	2nd	1st
2022–23	3	2	3	3	8	1	1	2	5	3	1	1	N/A	1	–	–	2	–	–	—N/a			947	1st	1st	1st
2023–24	2	1	2	2	1	3	1	3	9	1	1	1	N/A	1	–	2	5	–	–	—N/a			1034	1st	1st	1st
2024–25	1	2	3	9	10	1	2	8	1	—N/a				CNX	2	–	–	2	–	1	2	3	657	—N/a	1st	—N/a
2025–26	12	8	1	3	2	6	3	1	2	—N/a				–	5	–	1	–	–	2	2	1	634	—N/a	1st	—N/a

Note: Prior to 2020/21 season, to be classified in sprint standings athletes must compete on all sprint events throughout the season.

=== European Championships ===
- 2016 Altenberg – 6th in Singles
- 2017 Königssee – 8th in Singles
- 2018 Sigulda – 6th in Singles
- 2019 Oberhof – 5th in Singles
- 2020 Lillehammer – (silver) in Singles, 4th in Team relay
- 2021 Sigulda – 4th in Singles
- 2022 St. Moritz – 4th in Singles
- 2023 Sigulda – 8th in Singles

=== U23 World Championships ===
- 2016 Königssee– (silver) in Singles
- 2017 Innsbruck – (bronze) in Singles
- 2019 Winterberg – (gold) in Singles

=== Junior World Championships ===
- 2014 Sigulda – (bronze) in Singles
- 2015 Lillehammer – 5th in Singles
- 2016 Winterberg – (gold) in Singles, (gold) in Team relay

=== German Championships ===
- 2016 Königssee – 5th in Singles
- 2017 Altenberg – 5th in Singles
- 2018 Winterberg – (bronze) in Singles
- 2019 Oberhof – (gold) in Singles
- 2020 Königssee – (silver) in Singles
- 2021 Altenberg – (gold) in Singles
- 2022 Oberhof – (silver) in Singles
