= 2020 FIL World Luge Championships – Women's singles =

Women's singles at the 2020 FIL World Luge Championships
- Venue: Sliding Center Sanki
- Location: Sochi, Russia
- Dates: 15 February
- Competitors: 29 from 14 nations
- Winning time: 1:39.398

Medalists
gold medal	Ekaterina Katnikova	Russia
silver medal	Julia Taubitz	Germany
bronze medal	Victoria Demchenko	Russia

The Women's singles competition at the 2020 FIL World Luge Championships was held on 15 February 2020.

== Results ==
The first run was held at 16:18 and the second run at 18:05.

Rank	Bib	Name	Country	Run 1	Rank	Run 2	Rank	Total	Diff
1st place, gold medalist(s)	9	Ekaterina Katnikova	Russia	49.755 TR	1	49.643	2	1:39.398	
2nd place, silver medalist(s)	6	Julia Taubitz	Germany	49.891	4	49.601 TR	1	1:39.492	+0.094
3rd place, bronze medalist(s)	5	Victoria Demchenko	Russia	49.828	2	49.709	4	1:39.537	+0.139
4	7	Kendija Aparjode	Latvia	49.955	6	49.871	5	1:39.826	+0.428
5	2	Tatiana Ivanova	Russia	50.172	13	49.665	3	1:39.837	+0.439
6	4	Anna Berreiter	Germany	49.920	5	49.958	8	1:39.878	+0.480
7	1	Summer Britcher	United States	50.022	8	49.943	7	1:39.965	+0.567
8	14	Cheyenne Rosenthal	Germany	50.079	11	49.966	9	1:40.045	+0.647
9	11	Ulla Zirne	Latvia	50.073	10	49.984	10	1:40.057	+0.659
10	10	Andrea Vötter	Italy	50.008	7	50.053	11	1:40.061	+0.663
11	3	Madeleine Egle	Austria	50.043	9	50.088	12	1:40.131	+0.733
12	16	Ashley Farquharson	United States	50.202	14	49.934	6	1:40.136	+0.738
13	12	Natalie Maag	Switzerland	50.170	12	50.188	15	1:40.358	+0.960
14	8	Elīza Cauce	Latvia	49.841	3	50.616	18	1:40.457	+1.059
15	17	Verena Hofer	Italy	50.383	16	50.181	13	1:40.564	+1.166
16	15	Lisa Schulte	Austria	50.370	15	50.195	16	1:40.565	+1.167
17	18	Brittney Arndt	United States	50.412	17	50.184	14	1:40.596	+1.198
18	19	Marion Oberhofer	Italy	50.436	18	50.222	17	1:40.658	+1.260
19	21	Nina Zöggeler	Italy	50.730	20	50.688	19	1:41.418	+2.020
20	22	Raluca Strămăturaru	Romania	50.641	19	50.943	20	1:41.584	+2.186
21	24	Aileen Frisch	South Korea	50.803	21	Did not advance			
22	20	Klaudia Domaradzka	Poland	50.843	22	Did not advance			
23	27	Michaela Maršíková	Czech Republic	51.220	23	Did not advance			
24	26	Jung Hye-sun	South Korea	51.239	24	Did not advance			
25	25	Tatiana Salnikova	Kazakhstan	51.252	25	Did not advance			
26	29	Dania Obratov	Netherlands	52.595	26	Did not advance			
27	28	Daria Obratov	Netherlands	53.187	27	Did not advance			
28	13	Olesya Mikhaylenko	Russia	57.041	28	Did not advance			
	23	Katarína Šimoňáková	Slovakia	Did not finish		Did not advance			
