= 2018–19 Luge World Cup =

International luge competition

Winners
- Men's singles: (Russia) Semen Pavlichenko
- Men's sprint: (Russia) Roman Repilov
- Doubles: (Germany) Toni Eggert / Sascha Benecken
- Doubles sprint: (Germany) Toni Eggert / Sascha Benecken
- Women's singles: (Germany) Natalie Geisenberger
- Women's sprint: (Germany) Natalie Geisenberger
- Team relay: Germany

Competitions
- Venues: 9/9

The 2018–19 Luge World Cup was a multi race tournament over a season for Luge, organised by the FIL. The season started on 24 November 2018 in Innsbruck, Austria, and finished 24 February 2019 in Sochi, Russia.

== Calendar ==
| Venue | Date | Details |
|---|---|---|
| (Austria) Innsbruck | 24–25 November | Sprint |
| (Canada) Whistler (Vancouver) | 30 November–1 December | Team Relay |
| (Canada) Calgary | 7–8 December | Team Relay |
| (United States) Lake Placid | 15–16 December | Sprint/FIL America-Pacific Championships |
| (Germany) Königssee | 5–6 January | Team Relay. Men's race shortened to one run due to heavy snowfall. |
| (Latvia) Sigulda | 12–13 January | Team Relay |
| (Germany) Winterberg | 25–27 January | World Championships (Doesn't count toward to the World Cup standings) |
| (Germany) Altenberg | 2–3 February | Team Relay/FIL Asian Championships. Due to heavy snowfall, women's race shortened to one run and team relay cancelled but rescheduled to Sochi. |
| (Germany) Oberhof | 9–10 February | Team Relay/FIL European Championships |
| (Russia) Sochi | 23–24 February | Sprint and Team Relay |

== Results ==
=== Men's singles ===
| Event: | Gold: | Time | Silver: | Time | Bronze: | Time |
|---|---|---|---|---|---|---|
| Innsbruck | (Germany) Johannes Ludwig | 1:40.294 (50.193 / 50.101) | (Italy) Dominik Fischnaller | 1:40.392 (50.275 / 50.117) | (Austria) Wolfgang Kindl | 1:40.438 (50.421 / 50.017) |
| Innsbruck (Sprint) | (Austria) Wolfgang Kindl | 32.560 | (Russia) Aleksandr Gorbatcevich | 32.590 | (Germany) Felix Loch | 32.661 |
| Whistler (Vancouver) | (Austria) Wolfgang Kindl | 1:39.774 (49.837 / 49.937) | (Germany) Felix Loch | 1:39.873 (49.906 / 49.967) | (Austria) Reinhard Egger | 1:39.901 (49.886 / 50.015) |
| Calgary | (Austria) Wolfgang Kindl | 1:29.249 (44.644 / 44.605) | (Russia) Roman Repilov | 1:29.315 (44.670 / 44.645) | (Austria) David Gleirscher | 1:29.370 (44.699 / 44.671) |
| Lake Placid | (Russia) Roman Repilov | 1:43.048 (51.520 / 51.528) | (Germany) Johannes Ludwig | 1:43.219 (51.578 / 51.641) | (Austria) Reinhard Egger | 1:43.275 (51.605 / 51.670) |
| Lake Placid (Sprint) | (Russia) Roman Repilov | 32.554 | (Russia) Semen Pavlichenko | 32.588 | (Germany) Johannes Ludwig | 32.667 |
| Königssee | (Austria) Reinhard Egger | 50.084 | (Italy) Dominik Fischnaller | 50.104 | (Germany) Sebastian Bley | 50.192 |
| Sigulda | (Russia) Semen Pavlichenko | 1:36.074 (48.122 / 47.952) | (Russia) Aleksandr Gorbatcevich | 1:36.262 (48.153 / 48.109) | (Austria) David Gleirscher | 1:36.338 (48.262 / 48.076) |
| Altenberg | (Germany) Felix Loch | 1:48.669 (54.329 / 54.340) | (Austria) Reinhard Egger | 1:48.673 (54.272 / 54.401) | (Germany) Johannes Ludwig | 1:48.780 (54.354 / 54.426) |
| Oberhof | (Russia) Semen Pavlichenko | 1:26.203 (43.231 / 42.972) | (Russia) Roman Repilov | 1:26.247 (43.188 / 43.059) | (Latvia) Kristers Aparjods | 1:26.384 (43.290 / 43.094) |
| Sochi | (Russia) Semen Pavlichenko | 1:43.867 (52.023 / 51.844) | (Russia) Roman Repilov | 1:44.301 (52.198 / 52.103) | (Italy) Dominik Fischnaller | 1:44.327 (52.143 / 52.184) |
| Sochi (Sprint) | (Russia) Semen Pavlichenko | 35.566 | (Russia) Roman Repilov | 35.584 | (Russia) Maksim Aravin | 35.615 |

=== Women's singles ===
| Event: | Gold: | Time | Silver: | Time | Bronze: | Time |
|---|---|---|---|---|---|---|
| Innsbruck | (Germany) Natalie Geisenberger | 1:19.619 (39.769 / 39.850) | (Germany) Julia Taubitz | 1:19.885 (39.745 / 39.910) | (Germany) Tatjana Hüfner | 1:19.885 (39.892 / 39.993) |
| Innsbruck (Sprint) | (Germany) Natalie Geisenberger | 29.887 | (Germany) Julia Taubitz | 29.909 | (Germany) Dajana Eitberger | 29.944 |
| Whistler (Vancouver) | (Germany) Natalie Geisenberger | 1:16.904 (38.510 / 38.394) | (Germany) Julia Taubitz | 1:17.195 (38.601 / 38.594) | (United States) Emily Sweeney | 1:17.321 (38.616 / 38.705) |
| Calgary | (Germany) Julia Taubitz | 1:33.408 (46.675 / 46.733) | (Germany) Natalie Geisenberger | 1:33.512 (46.763 / 46.749) | (Canada) Kimberley McRae | 1:33.885 (46.829 / 47.056) |
| Lake Placid | (Germany) Dajana Eitberger | 1:27.674 (43.789 / 43.885) | (Germany) Natalie Geisenberger | 1:27.705 (43.801 / 43.904) | (Germany) Julia Taubitz | 1:27.929 (43.852 / 44.077) |
| Lake Placid (Sprint) | (Germany) Natalie Geisenberger | 37.667 | (United States) Summer Britcher | 37.745 | (Germany) Julia Taubitz | 37.753 |
| Königssee | (Germany) Julia Taubitz | 1:44.971 (52.566 / 52.405) | (United States) Summer Britcher | 1:45.391 (52.676 / 52.715) | (Austria) Hannah Prock | 1:45.586 (52.544 / 53.042) |
| Sigulda | (Russia) Tatiana Ivanova | 1:24.336 (42.272 / 42.064) | (Germany) Natalie Geisenberger | 1:24.464 (42.337 / 42.127) | (United States) Summer Britcher | 1:24.686 (42.427 / 42.259) |
| Altenberg | (Italy) Sandra Robatscher | 53.932 | (Germany) Natalie Geisenberger | 54.022 | (Russia) Victoria Demchenko | 54.178 |
| Oberhof | (Germany) Natalie Geisenberger | 1:22.810 (41.365 / 41.445) | (Germany) Tatjana Hüfner | 1:23.033 (41.462 / 41.571) | (Germany) Dajana Eitberger | 1:23.127 (41.455 / 41.672) |
| Sochi | (Germany) Natalie Geisenberger | 1:40.374 (50.163 / 50.211) | (Russia) Victoria Demchenko | 1:40.527 (50.232 / 50.295) | (Germany) Dajana Eitberger | 1:40.703 (50.316 / 50.387) |
| Sochi (Sprint) | (Russia) Victoria Demchenko | 31.505 | (Germany) Dajana Eitberger | 31.609 | (Germany) Natalie Geisenberger | 31.642 |

=== Doubles ===
| Event: | Gold: | Time | Silver: | Time | Bronze: | Time |
|---|---|---|---|---|---|---|
| Innsbruck | Thomas Steu; Lorenz Koller; Austria | 1:19.476 (39.793 / 39.683) | Toni Eggert; Sascha Benecken; Germany | 1:19.656 (39.796 / 39.860) | Vladislav Yuzhakov; Yuri Prokhorov; Russia | 1:19.758 (39.826 / 39.932) |
| Innsbruck (Sprint) | Thomas Steu; Lorenz Koller; Austria | 29.916 | Vladislav Yuzhakov; Yuri Prokhorov; Russia | 29.975 | Tobias Wendl; Tobias Arlt; Germany | 30.002 |
| Whistler (Vancouver) | Toni Eggert; Sascha Benecken; Germany | 1:16.691 (38.386 / 38.305) | Robin Johannes Geueke; David Gamm; Germany | 1:16.710 (38.403 / 38.307) | Tobias Wendl; Tobias Arlt; Germany | 1:16.720 (38.428 / 38.292) |
| Calgary | Tobias Wendl; Tobias Arlt; Germany | 1:27.489 (43.769 / 43.720) | Toni Eggert; Sascha Benecken; Germany | 1:27.580 (43.785 / 43.795) | Thomas Steu; Lorenz Koller; Austria | 1:27.761 (43.828 / 43.933) |
| Lake Placid | Toni Eggert; Sascha Benecken; Germany | 1:27.492 (43.864 / 43.628) | Tobias Wendl; Tobias Arlt; Germany | 1:27.812 (43.950 / 43.862) | Thomas Steu; Lorenz Koller; Austria | 1:28.032 (44.077 / 43.955) |
| Lake Placid (Sprint) | Toni Eggert; Sascha Benecken; Germany | 37.471 | Chris Mazdzer; Jayson Terdiman; United States | 37.669 | Tristan Walker; Justin Snith; Canada | 37.701 |
| Königssee | Toni Eggert; Sascha Benecken; Germany | 1:41.851 (50.693 / 51.158) | Tobias Wendl; Tobias Arlt; Germany | 1:42.157 (51.006 / 51.151) | Thomas Steu; Lorenz Koller; Austria | 1:42.683 (51.237 / 51.446) |
| Sigulda | Toni Eggert; Sascha Benecken; Germany | 1:24.119 (42.059 / 42.060) | Oskars Gudramovičs; Pēteris Kalniņš; Latvia | 1:24.498 (42.220 / 42.278) | Andris Šics; Juris Šics; Latvia | 1:24.588 (42.284 / 42.304) |
| Altenberg | Thomas Steu; Lorenz Koller; Austria | 1:23.463 (41.508 / 41.955) | Toni Eggert; Sascha Benecken; Germany | 1:23.506 (41.547 / 41.959) | Andris Šics; Juris Šics; Latvia | 1:23.849 (41.722 / 42.127) |
| Oberhof | Tobias Wendl; Tobias Arlt; Germany | 1:21.951 (40.963 / 40.988) | Toni Eggert; Sascha Benecken; Germany | 1:22.151 (41.154 / 40.997) | Andris Šics; Juris Šics; Latvia | 1:22.274 (41.159 / 41.115) |
| Sochi | Alexander Denisyev; Vladislav Antonov; Russia | 1:39.814 (49.997 / 49.817) | Toni Eggert; Sascha Benecken; Germany | 1:39.867 (49.890 / 49.977) | Vsevolod Kashkin; Konstantin Korshunov; Russia | 1:40.007 (49.879 / 50.128) |
| Sochi (Sprint) | Alexander Denisyev; Vladislav Antonov; Russia | 31.450 | Andris Šics; Juris Šics; Latvia | 31.461 | Toni Eggert; Sascha Benecken; Germany | 31.524 |

=== Team relay ===
| Event: | Gold: | Time | Silver: | Time | Bronze: | Time |
|---|---|---|---|---|---|---|
| Whistler (Vancouver) | Russia; Tatiana Ivanova; Semen Pavlichenko; Vsevolod Kashkin/Konstantin Korshunov | 2:04.124 (40.158 / 1:21.952) | Germany; Natalie Geisenberger; Felix Loch; Toni Eggert/Sascha Benecken | 2:04.214 (40.046 / 1:22.015) | Canada; Kyla Marie Graham; Reid Watts; Tristan Walker/Justin Snith | 2:04.413 (40.249 / 1:22.297) |
| Calgary | Germany; Julia Taubitz; Felix Loch; Tobias Wendl/Tobias Arlt | 2:21.550 (46.046 / 1:33.785) | United States; Summer Britcher; Tucker West; Chris Mazdzer/Jayson Terdiman | 2:21.819 (46.131 / 1:33.764) | Austria; Birgit Platzer; Wolfgang Kindl; Thomas Steu/Lorenz Koller | 2:21.920 (46.336 / 1:34.025) |
| Königssee | Germany; Julia Taubitz; Sebastian Bley; Toni Eggert/Sascha Benecken | 2:47.982 (54.824 / 1:51.393) | Austria; Hannah Prock; Reinhard Egger; Thomas Steu/Lorenz Koller | 2:48.182 (55.087 / 1:51.392) | United States; Summer Britcher; Tucker West; Chris Mazdzer/Jayson Terdiman | 2:48.487 (55.200 / 1:51.608) |
| Sigulda | Latvia; Kendija Aparjode; Kristers Aparjods; Oskars Gudramovičs/Pēteris Kalniņš | 2:13.213 (43.361 / 1:28.071) | Russia; Tatiana Ivanova; Semen Pavlichenko; Vladislav Yuzhakov/Yuri Prokhorov | 2:13.369 (43.376 / 1:27.928) | Germany; Natalie Geisenberger; Felix Loch; Toni Eggert/Sascha Benecken | 2:13.606 (43.360 / 1:28.393) |
| Altenberg | cancelled due to continued snowfall but rescheduled to Sochi | | | | | |
| Oberhof | Italy; Andrea Vötter; Dominik Fischnaller; Ivan Nagler/Fabian Malleier | 2:22.827 (46.219 / 1:34.335) | Germany; Natalie Geisenberger; Johannes Ludwig; Tobias Wendl/Tobias Arlt | 2:22.943 (46.112 / 1:34.501) | Latvia; Elīza Cauce; Inārs Kivlenieks; Andris Šics/Juris Šics | 2:23.256 (46.537 / 1:34.805) |
| Sochi | Russia; Victoria Demchenko; Semen Pavlichenko; Alexander Denisyev/Vladislav Antonov | 2:45.272 (53.817 / 1:48.991) | Germany; Natalie Geisenberger; Felix Loch; Toni Eggert/Sascha Benecken | 2:45.344 (53.764 / 1:49.525) | Latvia; Kendija Aparjode; Kristers Aparjods; Andris Šics/Juris Šics | 2:45.399 (53.895 / 1:49.514) |

== Standings ==
=== Men's singles ===
| Pos. | Luger | Points |
|---|---|---|
| 1. | Semen Pavlichenko (RUS) | 788 |
| 2. | Roman Repilov (RUS) | 718 |
| 3. | Felix Loch (GER)* | 685 |
| 4. | Johannes Ludwig (GER) | 666 |
| 5. | Dominik Fischnaller (ITA) | 623 |
| 6. | Reinhard Egger (AUT) | 596 |
| 7. | Wolfgang Kindl (AUT) | 579 |
| 8. | David Gleirscher (AUT) | 526 |
| 9. | Chris René Eißler (GER) | 432 |
| 10. | Kevin Fischnaller (ITA) | 402 |

- Final standings after 12 events
- (*Champion 2018)

=== Men's singles Sprint ===
| Pos. | Luger | Agg. time |
|---|---|---|
| 1. | Roman Repilov (RUS) | 1:40.877 |
| 2. | Semen Pavlichenko (RUS) | 1:40.886 |
| 3. | Felix Loch (GER) | 1:41.126 |
| 4. | Johannes Ludwig (GER) | 1:41.169 |
| 5. | Dominik Fischnaller (ITA) | 1:41.225 |
| 6. | Kevin Fischnaller (ITA) | 1:41.622 |
| 7. | Chris René Eißler (GER) | 1:41.657 |
| 8. | Max Langenhan (GER) | 1:41.806 |

- Final standings after 3 events

Only 8 lugers competed on all events

=== Women's singles ===
| Pos. | Luger | Points |
|---|---|---|
| 1. | Natalie Geisenberger (GER)* | 1052 |
| 2. | Julia Taubitz (GER) | 793 |
| 3. | Summer Britcher (USA) | 637 |
| 4. | Dajana Eitberger (GER) | 631 |
| 5. | Tatiana Ivanova (RUS) | 592 |
| 6. | Tatjana Hüfner (GER) | 572 |
| 7. | Andrea Vötter (ITA) | 546 |
| 8. | Elīza Cauce (LAT) | 441 |
| 9. | Victoria Demchenko (RUS) | 420 |
| 10. | Kendija Aparjode (LAT) | 419 |

- Final standings after 12 events
- (*Champion 2018)

=== Women's singles Sprint ===
| Pos. | Luger | Agg. time |
|---|---|---|
| 1. | Natalie Geisenberger (GER)* | 1:39.196 |
| 2. | Dajana Eitberger (GER) | 1:39.337 |
| 3. | Summer Britcher (USA) | 1:39.755 |
| 4. | Julia Taubitz (GER) | 1:40.065 |
| 5. | Andrea Vötter (ITA) | 1:40.096 |
| 6. | Tatiana Ivanova (RUS) | 1:40.125 |
| 7. | Ekaterina Baturina (RUS) | 1:40.311 |
| 8. | Tatjana Hüfner (GER) | 1:40.595 |

- Final standings after 3 events
- (*Champion 2018)

Only 8 lugers competed on all events

=== Doubles ===
| Pos. | Team | Points |
|---|---|---|
| 1. | Toni Eggert / Sascha Benecken (GER)* | 1050 |
| 2. | Thomas Steu / Lorenz Koller (AUT) | 817 |
| 3. | Tobias Wendl / Tobias Arlt (GER) | 790 |
| 4. | Andris Šics / Juris Šics (LAT) | 731 |
| 5. | Vladislav Yuzhakov / Yuri Prokhorov (RUS) | 562 |
| 6. | Robin Johannes Geueke / David Gamm (GER) | 517 |
| 7. | Kristens Putins / Imants Marcinkēvičs (LAT) | 482 |
| 8. | Chris Mazdzer / Jayson Terdiman (USA) | 459 |
| 9. | Vsevolod Kashkin / Konstantin Korshunov (RUS) | 443 |
| 10. | Tristan Walker / Justin Snith (CAN) | 412 |

- Final standings after 12 events
- (*Champion 2018)

=== Doubles Sprint ===
| Pos. | Team | Agg. time |
|---|---|---|
| 1. | Toni Eggert / Sascha Benecken (GER) | 1:39.033 |
| 2. | Thomas Steu / Lorenz Koller (AUT) | 1:39.226 |
| 3. | Andris Šics / Juris Šics (LAT)* | 1:39.245 |
| 4. | Tobias Wendl / Tobias Arlt (GER) | 1:39.590 |
| 5. | Vladislav Yuzhakov / Yuri Prokhorov (RUS) | 1:39.932 |
| 6. | Robin Johannes Geueke / David Gamm (GER) | 1:40.964 |
| 7. | Wojclech Jerzy Chmielewski / Jakub Kowalewski (POL) | 1:40.703 |
| 8. | Kristens Putins / Imants Marcinkēvičs (LAT) | 1:50.854 |

- Final standings after 3 events
- (*Champion 2018)

Only 8 double sleds competed on all events

=== Team Relay ===
| Pos. | Team | Points |
|---|---|---|
| 1. | Germany* | 525 |
| 2. | Russia | 455 |
| 3. | Latvia | 410 |
| 4. | Austria | 316 |
| 5. | United States | 315 |
| 6. | Italy | 308 |
| 7. | Canada | 216 |
| 8. | Ukraine | 203 |
| 9. | Poland | 165 |
| 10. | Slovakia | 46 |

- Final standings after 6 events
- (*Champion 2018)

== Medal table ==
| Rank | Nation | Gold | Silver | Bronze | Total |
|---|---|---|---|---|---|
| 1 | Germany | 20 | 22 | 15 | 57 |
| 2 | Russia | 12 | 10 | 4 | 26 |
| 3 | Austria | 7 | 2 | 10 | 19 |
| 4 | Italy | 2 | 2 | 1 | 5 |
| 5 | Latvia | 1 | 2 | 6 | 9 |
| 6 | United States | 0 | 4 | 3 | 7 |
| 7 | Canada | 0 | 0 | 3 | 3 |
| Totals (7 entries) | | 42 | 42 | 42 | 126 |
