= 2019 FIL World Luge Championships – Doubles =

Doubles at the 2019 FIL World Luge Championships
- Venue: Winterberg bobsleigh, luge, and skeleton track
- Location: Winterberg, Germany
- Dates: 26 January
- Competitors: 42 from 13 nations
- Teams: 21
- Winning time: 1:27.256

Medalists
gold medal	Toni Eggert; Sascha Benecken	Germany
silver medal	Tobias Wendl; Tobias Arlt	Germany
bronze medal	Thomas Steu; Lorenz Koller	Austria

2019 FIL World Luge Championships
Individual	men		women
Doubles	doubles
Sprint	men	doubles	women
Relay		mixed

The Doubles competition at the 2019 FIL World Luge Championships was held on 26 January 2019.

== Results ==
The first run was held at 11:14 and the second run at 12:42.

Rank	Bib	Name	Country	Run 1	Rank	Run 2	Rank	Total	Diff
1st place, gold medalist(s)	5	Toni Eggert; Sascha Benecken	Germany	43.643	2	43.613	1	1:27.256	
2nd place, silver medalist(s)	4	Tobias Wendl; Tobias Arlt	Germany	43.604	1	43.730	5	1:27.334	+0.078
3rd place, bronze medalist(s)	3	Thomas Steu; Lorenz Koller	Austria	43.670	3	43.727	4	1:27.397	+0.141
4	1	Oskars Gudramovičs; Pēteris Kalniņš	Latvia	43.768	5	43.650	2	1:27.418	+0.162
5	2	Andris Šics; Juris Šics	Latvia	43.682	4	43.770	8	1:27.452	+0.196
6	6	Ludwig Rieder; Patrick Rastner	Italy	43.796	6	43.756	7	1:27.552	+0.296
7	7	Vladislav Yuzhakov; Iurii Prokhorov	Russia	43.843	8	43.774	9	1:27.617	+0.361
8	10	Wojciech Chmielewski; Jakub Kowalewski	Poland	43.857	9	43.810	11	1:27.667	+0.411
9	8	Kristens Putins; Imants Marcinkēvičs	Latvia	43.823	7	43.686	14	1:27.691	+0.435
10	11	Vsevolod Kashkin; Konstantin Korshunov	Russia	43.938	11	43.780	10	1:27.718	+0.462
11	9	Chris Mazdzer; Jayson Terdiman	United States	43.890	10	43.830	13	1:27.720	+0.464
12	16	Aleksandr Denisev; Vladislav Antonov	Russia	44.032	12	43.743	6	1:27.775	+0.519
13	13	Ivan Nagler; Fabian Malleier	Italy	44.185	13	43.713	3	1:27.898	+0.642
14	12	Robin Geueke; David Gamm	Germany	44.243	15	43.811	12	1:28.054	+0.798
15	15	Park Jin-yong; Kang Doung-kyu	South Korea	44.332	16	44.113	15	1:28.445	+1.198
16	20	Emanuel Rieder; Simon Kainzwaldner	Italy	44.197	14	44.265	16	1:28.462	+1.206
17	21	Vasile Gîtlan; Flavius Craciun	Romania	45.199	18	44.564	17	1:19.763	+2.507
18	19	Rupert Staudinger; John-Paul Kibble	Great Britain	45.132	17	45.475	18	1:30.607	+3.351
19	17	Ihor Stakhiv; Andriy Lysetskyy	Ukraine	45.590	19	Did not qualify			
—	18	Filip Vejdělek; Zdeněk Pěkný	Czech Republic	Did not finish					
—	14	Tristan Walker; Justin Snith	Canada	Disqualified					
