= 2020 FIL European Luge Championships – Women's singles =

Women's singles at the 2020 FIL European Luge Championships
- Venue: Lillehammer Olympic Bobsleigh and Luge Track
- Location: Lillehammer, Norway
- Dates: 18 January
- Competitors: 24 from 11 nations
- Winning time: 1:35.482

Medalists
gold medal	Tatiana Ivanova	Russia
silver medal	Julia Taubitz	Germany
bronze medal	Victoria Demchenko	Russia

The Women's singles competition at the 2020 FIL European Luge Championships was held on 18 January 2020.

== Competition schedule ==
All times are (UTC+1).

Date	Time	Event
18 January	09:50	Run 1
18 January	11:15	Run 2

== Results ==
Two runs in one day, were used to determine the winner.

Rank	Bib	Name	Country	Run 1	Rank	Run 2	Rank	Total	Diff
1st place, gold medalist(s)	28	Tatiana Ivanova	Russia	47.826	3	47.656	1	1:35.482	
2nd place, silver medalist(s)	24	Julia Taubitz	Germany	47.753	1	47.871	3	1:35.624	+0.142
3rd place, bronze medalist(s)	25	Victoria Demchenko	Russia	47.758	2	47.894	4	1:35.652	+0.170
4	23	Andrea Vötter	Italy	47.937	5	47.912	5	1:35.849	+0.367
5	14	Madeleine Egle	Austria	47.837	4	48.024	7	1:35.861	+0.379
6	26	Ekaterina Katnikova	Russia	48.009	7	47.854	2	1:35.863	+0.381
7	17	Ulla Zirne	Latvia	47.967	6	48.143	8	1:36.110	+0.628
8	19	Jessica Tiebel	Germany	48.082	8	48.200	10	1:36.282	+0.800
9	20	Kendija Aparjode	Latvia	48.130	9	48.263	13	1:36.393	+0.911
10	21	Elīza Cauce	Latvia	48.204	10	48.207	11	1:36.411	+0.929
11	27	Anna Berreiter	Germany	48.684	18	47.932	6	1:36.616	+1.134
12	18	Natalie Maag	Switzerland	48.405	13	48.317	14	1:36.722	+1.240
13	15	Raluca Strămăturaru	Romania	48.535	16	48.215	12	1:36.750	+1.268
14	13	Nina Zöggeler	Italy	48.702	19	48.162	9	1:36.864	+1.382
15	12	Olena Stetskiv	Ukraine	48.547	17	48.372	16	1:36.919	+1.437
16	9	Marion Oberhofer	Italy	48.358	11	48.652	19	1:37.010	+1.528
17	6	Elīna Ieva Vītola	Latvia	48.532	15	48.568	18	1:37.100	+1.618
18	5	Vilde Tangnes	Norway	48.423	14	48.717	20	1:37.140	+1.658
19	11	Cheyenne Rosenthal	Germany	48.862	21	48.363	15	1:37.225	+1.743
20	8	Olesya Mikhaylenko	Russia	49.117	23	48.483	17	1:37.600	+2.118
21	1	Hannah Prock	Austria	48.749	20	49.061	22	1:37.810	+2.328
22	2	Klaudia Domaradzka	Poland	49.067	22	48.819	21	1:37.886	+2.404
23		Michaela Maršíková	Czech Republic	Did not qualify via Nationscup					
24		Olena Smaha	Ukraine	Did not qualify via Nationscup					
25		Tove Kohala	Sweden	Did not qualify via Nationscup					
26		Daria Obratov	Netherlands	Did not qualify via Nationscup					
27		Dania Obratov	Netherlands	Did not qualify via Nationscup					
	10	Katarína Šimoňáková	Slovakia	48.376	12	Did not finish			
	34	Verena Hofer	Italy	Did not finish					
