= 2019 FIL World Luge Championships – Men's sprint =

Men's sprint at the 2019 FIL World Luge Championships
- Venue: Winterberg bobsleigh, luge, and skeleton track
- Location: Winterberg, Germany
- Dates: 25 January
- Competitors: 37 from 18 nations
- Winning time: 35.835

Medalists
gold medal	Jonas Müller	Austria
silver medal	Felix Loch	Germany
bronze medal	Semen Pavlichenko	Russia

2019 FIL World Luge Championships
Individual	men		women
Doubles	doubles
Sprint	men	doubles	women
Relay		mixed

The Men's sprint competition at the 2019 FIL World Luge Championships was held on 25 January 2019.

== Results ==
The qualification was held at 11:44 and the final at 15:33.

Rank	Bib	Name	Country	Qualification		Final	
Rank	Bib	Name	Country	Time	Rank	Time	Diff
1st place, gold medalist(s)	2	Jonas Müller	Austria	35.832	2	35.835	
2nd place, silver medalist(s)	13	Felix Loch	Germany	35.895	4	35.859	+0.024
3rd place, bronze medalist(s)	11	Semen Pavlichenko	Russia	35.801	1	35.889	+0.054
4	15	Johannes Ludwig	Germany	36.096	12	35.914	+0.079
5	19	Kristers Aparjods	Latvia	35.981	8	35.954	+0.119
6	12	Reinhard Egger	Austria	36.106	15	35.963	+0.128
7	7	Chris Eißler	Germany	35.858	3	35.968	+0.133
8	14	Wolfgang Kindl	Austria	36.018	10	35.988	+0.153
9	6	Kevin Fischnaller	Italy	35.968	7	35.992	+0.157
10	17	Stepan Fedorov	Russia	36.098	13	36.085	+0.250
11	10	Dominik Fischnaller	Italy	35.956	6	36.094	+0.259
12	20	Riks Rozītis	Latvia	36.082	11	36.176	+0.341
13	21	Reid Watts	Canada	36.102	14	36.178	+0.343
14	9	David Gleirscher	Austria	36.017	9	36.498	+0.663
15	5	Aleksandr Gorbatcevich	Russia	35.933	5	36.801	+0.966
16	23	Valentin Crețu	Romania	36.120	16		
16	16	Jozef Ninis	Slovakia	36.120	16		
18	4	Sebastian Bley	Germany	36.121	18		
19	27	Mateusz Sochowicz	Poland	36.124	19		
20	3	Tucker West	United States	36.144	20		
21	18	Inārs Kivlenieks	Latvia	36.163	21		
22	1	Jonathan Gustafson	United States	36.170	22		
23	26	Arturs Dārznieks	Latvia	36.276	23		
24	24	Anton Dukach	Ukraine	36.312	24		
25	8	Roman Repilov	Russia	36.377	25		
26	22	Maciej Kurowski	Poland	36.464	26		
27	25	Andriy Mandziy	Ukraine	36.476	27		
28	34	Alexander Ferlazzo	Australia	36.510	28		
29	28	Theodor Turea	Romania	36.870	29		
30	29	Aleksander Melås	Norway	36.912	30		
31	30	Svante Kohala	Sweden	36.987	31		
32	33	Žiga Biruš	Slovenia	37.163	32		
33	31	Michael Lejsek	Czech Republic	37.213	33		
34	35	Rupert Staudinger	Great Britain	37.371	34		
35	37	Raymond Thompson	Great Britain	38.042	35		
	38	Luke Farrar	Great Britain	DNF			
	36	Lien Te-an	Chinese Taipei	DNS			
	32	Pavel Angelov	Bulgaria	DSQ			
