= 2019 FIL World Luge Championships – Doubles' sprint =

Doubles' sprint at the 2019 FIL World Luge Championships
- Venue: Winterberg bobsleigh, luge, and skeleton track
- Location: Winterberg, Germany
- Dates: 25 January
- Competitors: 42 from 13 nations
- Teams: 21
- Winning time: 30.812

Medalists
gold medal	Toni Eggert; Sascha Benecken	Germany
silver medal	Tobias Wendl; Tobias Arlt	Germany
bronze medal	Thomas Steu; Lorenz Koller	Austria

2019 FIL World Luge Championships
Individual	men		women
Doubles	doubles
Sprint	men	doubles	women
Relay		mixed

The Doubles' sprint competition at the 2019 FIL World Luge Championships was held on 25 January 2019.

== Results ==
The qualification was held at 09:00 and the final at 13:44.

Rank	Bib	Name	Country	Qualification		Final Run	
Rank	Bib	Name	Country	Time	Rank	Time	Diff
1st place, gold medalist(s)	15	Toni Eggert; Sascha Benecken	Germany	30.669	1	30.812	
2nd place, silver medalist(s)	14	Tobias Wendl; Tobias Arlt	Germany	30.706	2	30.824	+0.012
3rd place, bronze medalist(s)	13	Thomas Steu; Lorenz Koller	Austria	30.719	3	30.829	+0.017
4	12	Andris Šics; Juris Šics	Latvia	30.759	6	30.868	+0.056
5	10	Chris Mazdzer; Jayson Terdiman	United States	30.830	10	30.895	+0.083
6	4	Vsevolod Kashkin; Konstantin Korshunov	Russia	30.805	9	30.960	+0.148
7	9	Robin Geueke; David Gamm	Germany	30.779	7	30.979	+0.167
8	8	Ludwig Rieder; Patrick Rastner	Italy	30.747	5	30.983	+0.171
9	20	Alexander Denisyev; Vladislav Antonov	Russia	30.743	4	30.989	+0.177
10	5	Wojciech Chmielewski; Jakub Kowalewski	Poland	30.781	8	31.032	+0.220
11	11	Vladislav Yuzhakov; Iurii Prokhorov	Russia	31.000	14	31.034	+0.222
12	7	Kristens Putins; Imants Marcinkēvičs	Latvia	30.892	12	31.071	+0.259
13	6	Tristan Walker; Justin Snith	Canada	30.886	11	31.102	+0.290
14	19	Emanuel Rieder; Simon Kainzwaldner	Italy	30.940	13	31.173	+0.361
15	2	Park Jin-yong; Kang Doung-kyu	South Korea	31.088	15	31.367	+0.555
16	16	Vasile Gitlan; Flavius Craciun	Romania	31.132	16		
17	17	Ivan Nagler; Fabian Malleier	Italy	31.148	17		
18	18	Ihor Stakhiv; Andriy Lysetskyy	Ukraine	31.374	18		
19	3	Filip Vejdělek; Zdeněk Pěkný	Czech Republic	31.637	19		
20	21	Rupert Staudinger; John-Paul Kibble	Great Britain	32.008	20		
21	1	Oskars Gudramovičs; Pēteris Kalniņš	Latvia	32.510	21		
