= Olena Smaha =

Ukrainian luger (born 2000)

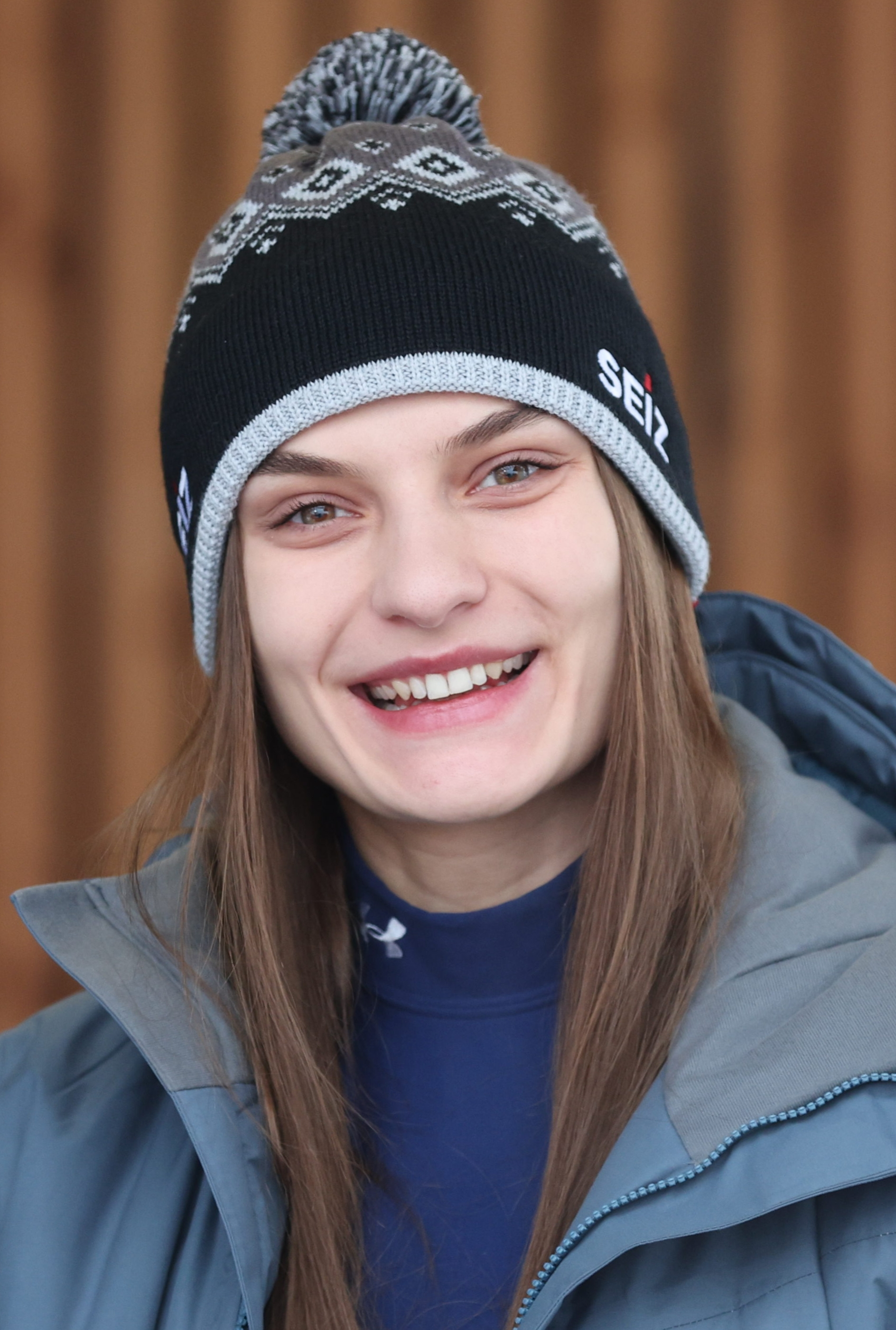
- Smaha in 2024

Personal information
- Born: 13 January 2000 (age 26) Lviv, Ukraine

Sport
- Country: Ukraine
- Sport: Luge
- Event: Women's singles

Olena Smaha (Ukrainian: Олена Смага, born 13 January 2000 in Lviv) is a Ukrainian luger. She competed at the 2026 Winter Olympics.

During the singles luge at the 2026 Olympics, Smaha wrote "remembrance is not a violation" on her glove to protest the disqualification of skeleton racer Vladyslav Heraskevych. The Internationa Olympic Committee barred Heraskevych from competing due to his helmet, which paid tribute to athletes killed in the Russian invasion of Ukraine.

== Career results ==
=== Winter Olympics ===
| Year | Event | Singles | Relay |
|---|---|---|---|
| 2026 | Cortina d'Ampezzo, Italy | 20 | — |

=== World Championships ===
| Year | Event | Singles | Mixed Singles | Singles sprint |
|---|---|---|---|---|
| 2021 | Königssee, Germany | DNF | —N/a | 30 |
| 2025 | Whistler, Canada | 29 | 16 | —N/a |

=== European Championships ===
| Year | Event | Singles | Relay | Mixed Singles |
|---|---|---|---|---|
| 2020 | Lillehammer, Norway | DNQ | — | —N/a |
| 2021 | Sigulda, Latvia | DNQ | — | —N/a |
| 2022 | St. Moritz, Switzerland | 20 | — | —N/a |
| 2025 | Winterberg, Germany | 19 | — | —N/a |
| 2026 | Oberhof, Germany | 17 | — | DSQ |

=== Luge World Cup ===
==== Rankings ====
| Season | Singles | Singles Sprint | Overall |
|---|---|---|---|
| 2018–19 | 48 | — | —N/a |
| 2019–20 | 28 | — | —N/a |
| 2020–21 | 29 | — | 31 |
| 2021–22 | 29 | — | 30 |
| 2022–23 | 43 | — | 43 |
| 2023–24 | Missed the season | | |
| 2024–25 | 27 | —N/a | |
| 2025–26 | 16 | —N/a | |
