= 2019 FIL World Luge Championships – Men's singles =

Men's singles at the 2019 FIL World Luge Championships
- Venue: Winterberg bobsleigh, luge, and skeleton track
- Location: Winterberg, Germany
- Dates: 27 January
- Competitors: 38 from 19 nations
- Winning time: 1:44.250

Medalists
gold medal	Felix Loch	Germany
silver medal	Reinhard Egger	Austria
bronze medal	Semen Pavlichenko	Russia

2019 FIL World Luge Championships
Individual	men		women
Doubles	doubles
Sprint	men	doubles	women
Relay		mixed

The men's singles competition at the 2019 FIL World Luge Championships was held on 27 January 2019.

== Results ==
The first run was held at 11:10 and the second run at 13:18.

Rank	Bib	Name	Country	Run 1	Rank	Run 2	Rank	Total	Diff
1st place, gold medalist(s)	6	Felix Loch	Germany	52.063	1	52.187	2	1:44.250	
2nd place, silver medalist(s)	8	Reinhard Egger	Austria	52.176	5	52.174	1	1:44.350	+0.100
3rd place, bronze medalist(s)	2	Semen Pavlichenko	Russia	52.112	2	52.251	5	1:44.363	+0.113
4	7	Johannes Ludwig	Germany	52.170	4	52.243	4	1:44.413	+0.163
5	14	Chris Eißler	Germany	52.301	7	52.267	7	1:44.568	+0.318
6	5	Roman Repilov	Russia	52.208	6	52.369	10	1:44.577	+0.327
7	3	Dominik Fischnaller	Italy	52.335	9	52.334	9	1:44.669	+0.419
8	19	Wolfgang Kindl	Austria	52.498	12	52.233	3	1:44.731	+0.481
9	12	Tucker West	United States	52.303	8	52.536	16	1:44.839	+0.589
10	9	Kevin Fischnaller	Italy	52.143	3	52.697	24	1:44.840	+0.590
11	10	Inārs Kivlenieks	Latvia	52.362	10	52.488	13	1:44.850	+0.600
12	17	Kristers Aparjods	Latvia	52.583	13	52.302	8	1:44.885	+0.635
13	13	Jozef Ninis	Slovakia	52.488	11	52.552	17	1:45.040	+0.790
14	24	Jonathan Gustafson	United States	52.845	22	52.260	6	1:45.105	+0.855
15	16	Stepan Fedorov	Russia	52.679	15	52.437	12	1:45.116	+0.866
16	20	Riks Rozītis	Latvia	52.705	17	52.413	11	1:45.118	+0.868
17	18	Valentin Crețu	Romania	52.687	16	52.558	18	1:45.245	+0.995
18	23	Reid Watts	Canada	52.665	14	52.605	19	1:45.270	+1.020
19	21	Mateusz Sochowicz	Poland	52.817	20	52.491	14	1:45.308	+1.058
20	15	Sebastian Bley	Germany	52.817	19	52.493	15	1:45.310	+1.060
21	25	Arturs Dārznieks	Latvia	52.747	18	52.630	22	1:45.377	+1.127
22	22	Anton Dukach	Ukraine	52.833	21	52.619	20	1:45.452	+1.202
23	26	Andriy Mandziy	Ukraine	53.060	23	52.623	21	1:45.683	+1.433
24	28	Maciej Kurowski	Poland	53.124	24	52.689	23	1:45.813	+1.563
25	27	Alexander Ferlazzo	Australia	53.240	25	52.954	25	1:46.194	+1.944
26	30	Theodor Turea	Romania	53.417	26	did not advance			
27	33	Rupert Staudinger	Great Britain	53.657	27	did not advance			
28	29	Aleksander Melås	Norway	53.734	28	did not advance			
29	32	Svante Kohala	Sweden	53.870	29	did not advance			
30	35	Pavel Angelov	Bulgaria	53.902	30	did not advance			
31	31	Žiga Biruš	Slovenia	53.960	31	did not advance			
32	34	Michael Lejsek	Czech Republic	54.293	32	did not advance			
33	36	Luke Farrar	Great Britain	54.566	33	did not advance			
34	37	Raymond Thompson	Great Britain	54.912	34	did not advance			
35	38	Lien Te-an	Chinese Taipei	55.479	35	did not advance			
—	1	Jonas Müller	Austria	did not finish					
—	11	Aleksandr Gorbatcevich	Russia	did not finish					
—	4	David Gleirscher	Austria	Disqualified					
