= 2019 FIL World Luge Championships – Team relay =

Team relay at the 2019 FIL World Luge Championships
- Venue: Winterberg bobsleigh, luge, and skeleton track
- Location: Winterberg, Germany
- Dates: 27 January
- Competitors: 44 from 11 nations
- Teams: 11
- Winning time: 2:24.116

Medalists
gold medal	Tatiana Ivanova; Semen Pavlichenko; Vladislav Yuzhakov; Yuri Prokhorov	Russia
silver medal	Hannah Prock; Reinhard Egger; Thomas Steu; Lorenz Koller	Austria
bronze medal	Natalie Geisenberger; Felix Loch; Toni Eggert; Sascha Benecken	Germany

2019 FIL World Luge Championships
Individual	men		women
Doubles	doubles
Sprint	men	doubles	women
Relay		mixed

The Team relay competition at the 2019 FIL World Luge Championships was held on 27 January 2019.

== Results ==
The race was started at 16:00.

Rank	Bib	Country	Time	Diff
1st place, gold medalist(s)	10	Russia	2:24.116	
2nd place, silver medalist(s)	9	Austria	2:24.624	+0.508
3rd place, bronze medalist(s)	11	Germany	2:24.647	+0.531
4	7	Italy	2:24.809	+0.693
5	3	Canada	2:24.875	+0.759
6	6	United States	2:25.147	+1.031
7	4	Poland	2:25.948	+1.832
8	5	Romania	2:26.125	+2.009
9	2	Ukraine	2:27.538	+3.242
10	1	Great Britain	2:31.037	+6.921
—	8	Latvia	Disqualified	
