= 2020 FIL World Luge Championships =

Championships held in February 2020 in Russia

- Venue: Sliding Center Sanki, Sochi, Russia
- Dates: 14–16 February

The 2020 FIL World Luge Championships were held from 14 to 16 February 2020 in Sochi, Russia.

== Schedule ==
Seven events were held.

All times are local (UTC+3).

Date	Time	Events
14 February	09:00	Doubles' sprint qualification
14 February	10:00	Women's sprint qualification
14 February	11:15	Men's sprint qualification
14 February	13:30	Doubles' sprint final
14 February	14:25	Women's sprint final
14 February	15:20	Men's sprint final
15 February	13:40	Doubles 1st run
15 February	15:05	Doubles 2nd run
15 February	16:15	Women 1st run
15 February	18:05	Women 2nd run
16 February	13:15	Men 1st run
16 February	15:20	Men 2nd run
16 February	17:50	Team relay

== Medal summary ==
=== Medal table ===
* Host nation (Russia)

Rank	Nation	Gold	Silver	Bronze	Total
1	Russia*	5	2	1	8
2	Germany	2	1	2	5
3	Austria	0	2	1	3
4	Italy	0	1	1	2
4	Latvia	0	1	1	2
6	United States	0	0	1	1
Totals (6 entries)		7	7	7	21

=== Medalists ===
Event	Gold		Silver		Bronze	
Men's singles	Roman Repilov; Russia	1:43.099	Jonas Müller; Austria	1:43.131	Wolfgang Kindl; Austria	1:43.301
Men's sprint	Roman Repilov; Russia	34.901	David Gleirscher; Austria	34.907	Dominik Fischnaller; Italy	34.959
Women's singles	Ekaterina Katnikova; Russia	1:39.398	Julia Taubitz; Germany	1:39.492	Victoria Demchenko; Russia	1:39.537
Women's sprint	Ekaterina Katnikova; Russia	31.105	Tatiana Ivanova; Russia	31.113	Elīza Cauce; Latvia	31.142
Doubles	Germany; Toni Eggert; Sascha Benecken	1:39.384	Russia; Alexander Denisyev; Vladislav Antonov	1:39.488	Germany; Tobias Wendl; Tobias Arlt	1:39.526
Doubles' sprint	Russia; Alexander Denisyev; Vladislav Antonov	31.281	Italy; Emanuel Rieder; Simon Kainzwaldner	31.326	Germany; Tobias Wendl; Tobias Arlt	31.362
Team relay	Germany; Julia Taubitz; Johannes Ludwig; Toni Eggert / Sascha Benecken	2:44.213	Latvia; Kendija Aparjode; Kristers Aparjods; Andris Šics / Juris Šics	2:44.534	United States; Summer Britcher; Tucker West; Chris Mazdzer / Jayson Terdiman	2:44.557
