= Reinhard Egger =

Austrian luger (born 1989)

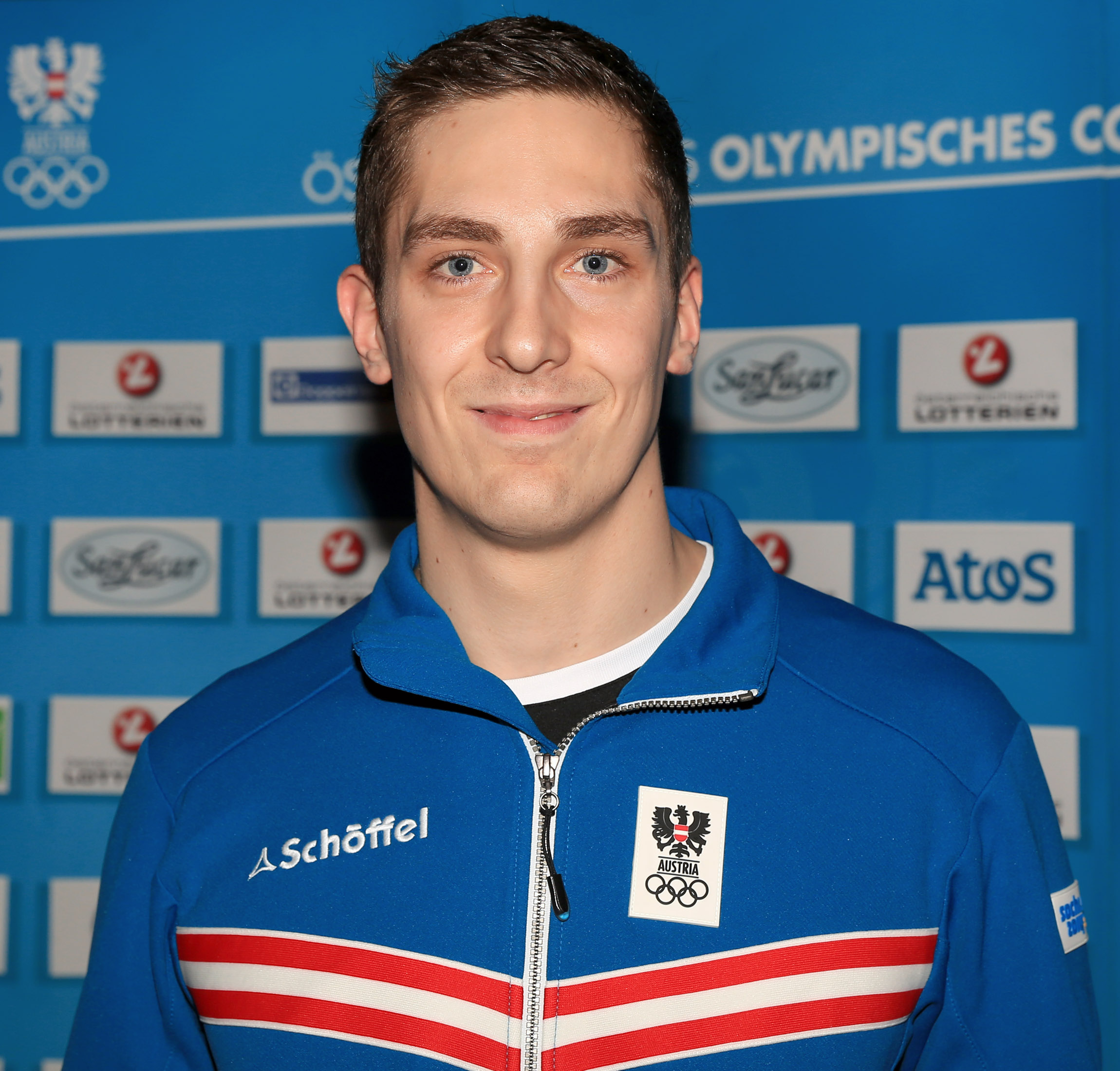

Personal information
- Nationality: Austrian
- Born: 11 September 1989 (age 37) Wörgl, Austria
- Height: 1.91 m (6 ft 3 in)
- Weight: 95 kg (209 lb)

Sport
- Country: Austria
- Sport: Luge
- Event: Singles
Medal record
World Championships
Silver medal – second place	2019 Winterberg	Singles
Silver medal – second place	2019 Winterberg	Team relay

Reinhard Egger (born 11 September 1989) is an Austrian luger who has competed since 1999. On 21 November 2009, he finished seventh in the men's singles event at a World Cup event in Calgary. During the 2018–19 Luge World Cup season, Egger finished third in Whistler and third in Lake Placid.
