= Yuri Prokhorov (luger) =

Russian luger (born 1991)

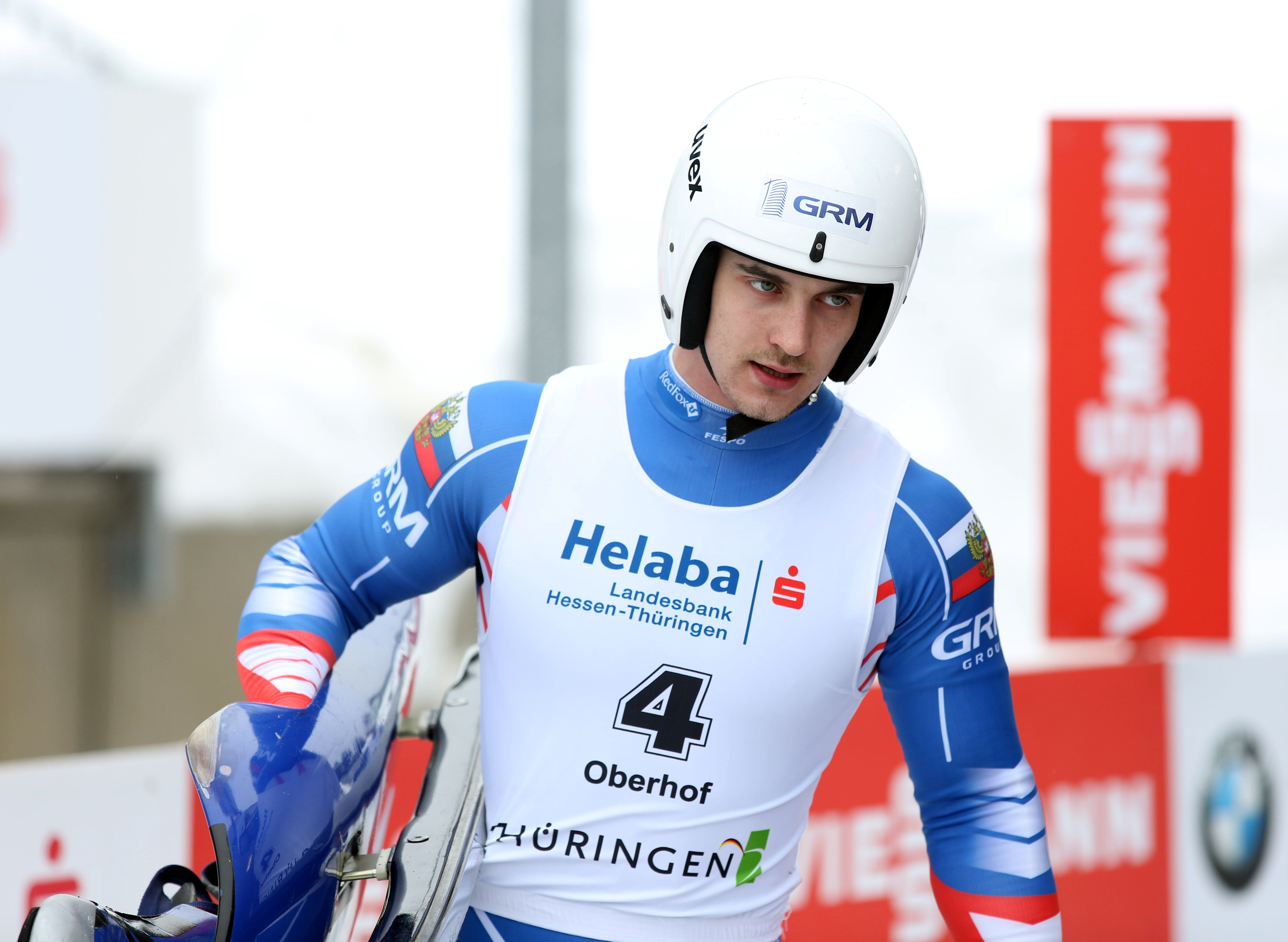
- Prokhorov in 2017

Personal information
- Native name: Юрий Вадимович Прохоров
- Full name: Yuri Vadimovich Prokhorov
- Nationality: Russian
- Born: 11 November 1991 (age 34) Dmitrov, Moscow Oblast, Russia
- Height: 1.73 m (5 ft 8 in)
- Weight: 76 kg (168 lb)

Sport
- Country: Russia
- Sport: Luge
- Event: Doubles
Medal record
World Championships
Gold medal – first place	2019 Winterberg	Team relay
European Championships
Bronze medal – third place	2020 Lillehammer	Doubles
Bronze medal – third place	2022 St. Moritz	Team relay

Yuri Vadimovich Prokhorov (Russian: Юрий Вадимович Прохоров; born 11 November 1991) is a Russian luger.

He participated at the 2019 FIL World Luge Championships, winning a medal. He also participated in the Men's doubles event at the 2022 Winter Olympics.
