= Lin Sin-rong =

Taiwanese bobsledder & luger (born 1998)

Lin Sin-Rong
Personal information
- Nationality: Republic of China (Taiwan)
- Born: 3 July 1998 (age 27) New Taipei City, Taiwan

Sport
- Sport: Luge; Bobsleigh

Lin Sin-rong (Chinese: 林欣蓉; pinyin: Lín Xīnróng; born 3 July 1998) is a Taiwanese bobsledder and luger who competed at the 2022 and 2026 Winter Olympics. She was the opening flagbearer for Chinese Taipei at the 2026 Olympics.

In the 2022 Olympics, she placed 31st in the luge.

She competed in both the two woman and monobob events at the 2026 Olympics. She placed 21st in the monobob and 25th in the two woman alongside Lin Song-En.
