= Victoria Demchenko =

Russian luger (born 1995)

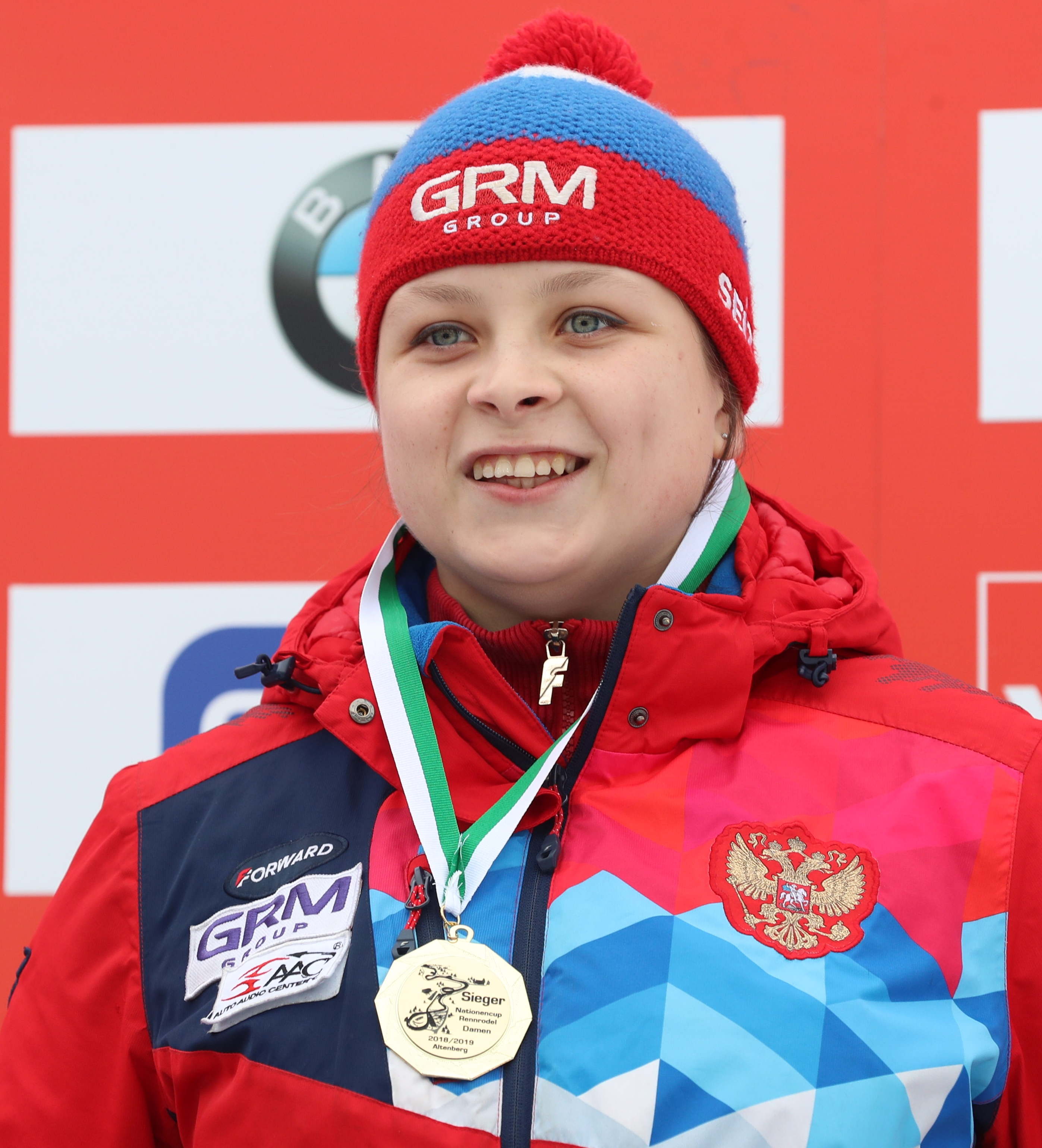
- Women's Nations Cup at 2018-19 Luge World Cup in Altenberg

Personal information
- Full name: Victoria Albertovna Demchenko
- Nationality: Russian
- Born: 26 November 1995 (age 30) Chusovoy, Russia
- Height: 1.80 m (5 ft 11 in)
- Weight: 78 kg (172 lb)

Sport
- Country: Russia
- Sport: Luge
- Event: Singles
Medal record
World Championships
Bronze medal – third place	2020 Sochi	Singles
European Championships
Bronze medal – third place	2020 Lillehammer	Singles
Bronze medal – third place	2021 Sigulda	Singles

Victoria Albertovna Demchenko (Russian: Виктория Альбертовна Демченко; born 26 November 1995) is a Russian luger. She is the daughter of Albert Demchenko, who is also her coach.

Demchenko's best results to date came in the 2018–19 season, finishing thrice in the top three. In the Königssee stage she had a heavy crash, after which she was taken to the hospital and released after only having a minor concussion. She won her first World Cup title in the Sochi stage in sprint.

== World Cup podiums ==
Season	Date	Location	Discipline	Place
2016–17	15 January 2017	Sigulda, Latvia	Singles (sprint)	3rd
2017–18	21 January 2018	Lillehammer, Norway	Singles (sprint)	2nd
2018–19	3 February 2019	Altenberg, Germany	Singles	3rd
2018–19	23 February 2019	Sochi, Russia	Singles	2nd
2018–19	24 February 2019	Sochi, Russia	Singles (sprint)	1st
2018–19	24 February 2019	Sochi, Russia	Team relay	1st
2019–20	30 November 2019	Lake Placid, United States	Singles	3rd
2019–20	13 December 2019	Whistler, Canada	Singles	3rd
2019–20	26 January 2020	Sigulda, Latvia	Singles (sprint)	2nd
2019–20	29 February 2020	Königssee, Germany	Singles	3rd
2019–20	1 March 2020	Königssee, Germany	Team relay	3rd
2020–21	28 November 2021	Sochi, Russia	Singles	3rd
2020–21	28 November 2021	Sochi, Russia	Team relay	1st
