= Lisa Schulte (luger) =

Austrian luger (born 2000)

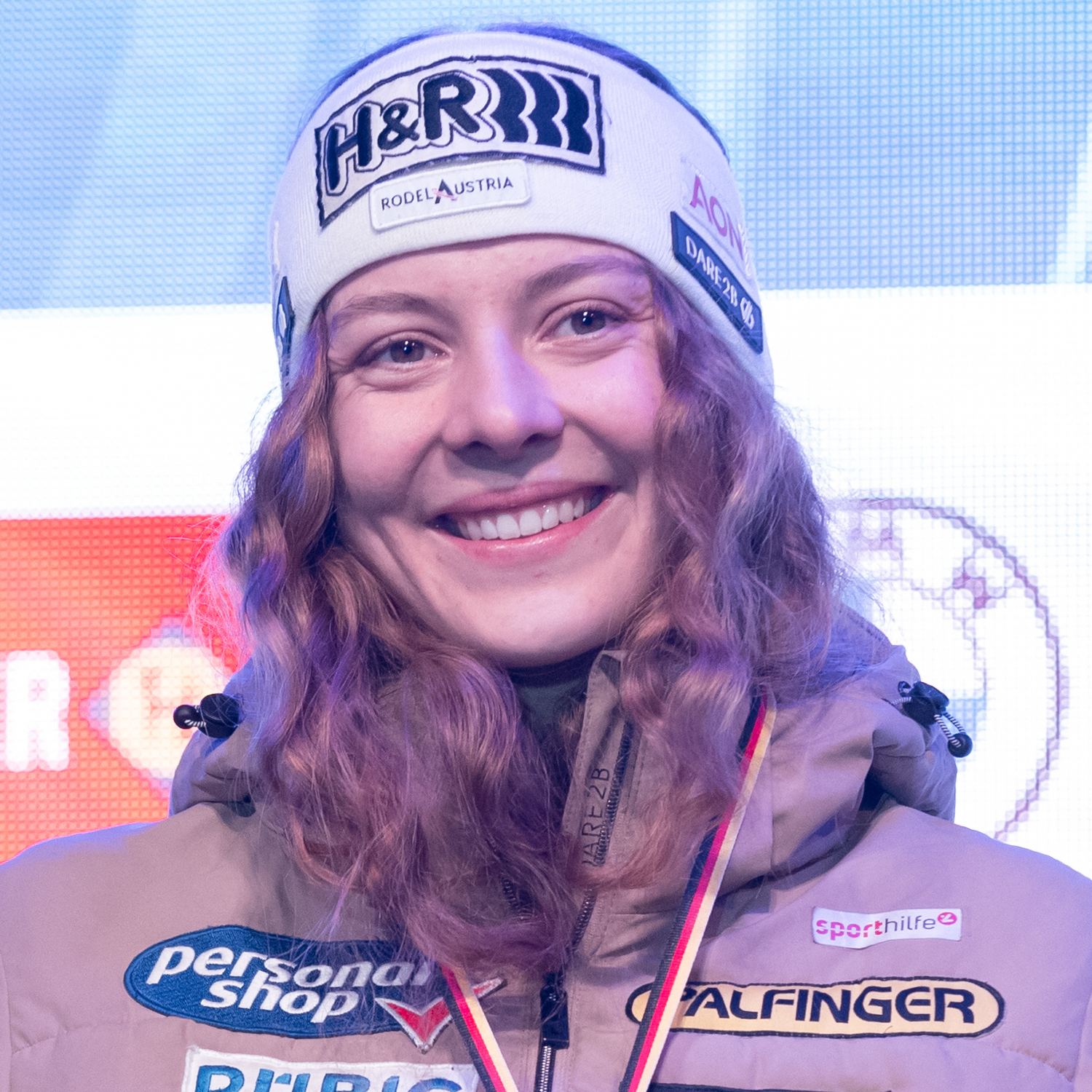
- Schulte in 2026

Personal information
- Nationality: Austrian
- Born: 13 December 2000 (age 25) Regensburg, Germany
- Height: 175 cm (5 ft 9 in)

Sport
- Country: Austria
- Sport: Luge
- Event: Singles
Medal record
Women's luge
Representing Austria
Olympic Games
| Silver medal – second place | 2026 Milano Cortina | Team relay |
World Championships
| Gold medal – first place | 2024 Altenberg | Singles |
European Championships
| Silver medal – second place | 2026 Oberhof | Singles |
| Silver medal – second place | 2026 Oberhof | Team relay |
| Bronze medal – third place | 2026 Oberhof | Mixed singles |
| Bronze medal – third place | 2025 Winterberg | Singles |
Junior Championships
| Silver medal – second place | 2019 Innsbruck | Team relay |
| Bronze medal – third place | 2020 Oberhof | Singles |

Lisa Schulte (born 13 December 2000) is an Austrian luger.

== Career ==
In the first race of the 2021-22 season in Yanqing, Schulte took third place and was on the individual podium for the first time in her career.

Schulte is included in Austria at the 2022 Winter Olympics alongside Madeleine Egle and Hannah Prock; she finished the race in sixth position (+1.431 s) which ended in victory by Natalie Geisenberger. Madeleine Egle was selected for the team relay.

She wins the single-seater title at the 2024 World Luge Championships in Altenberg.

== Personal life ==
Born in Germany, Schulte moved to Austria with her family at the age of 2. She was naturalized as German in 2016.
