= Ekaterina Katnikova =

Russian luger (born 1994)

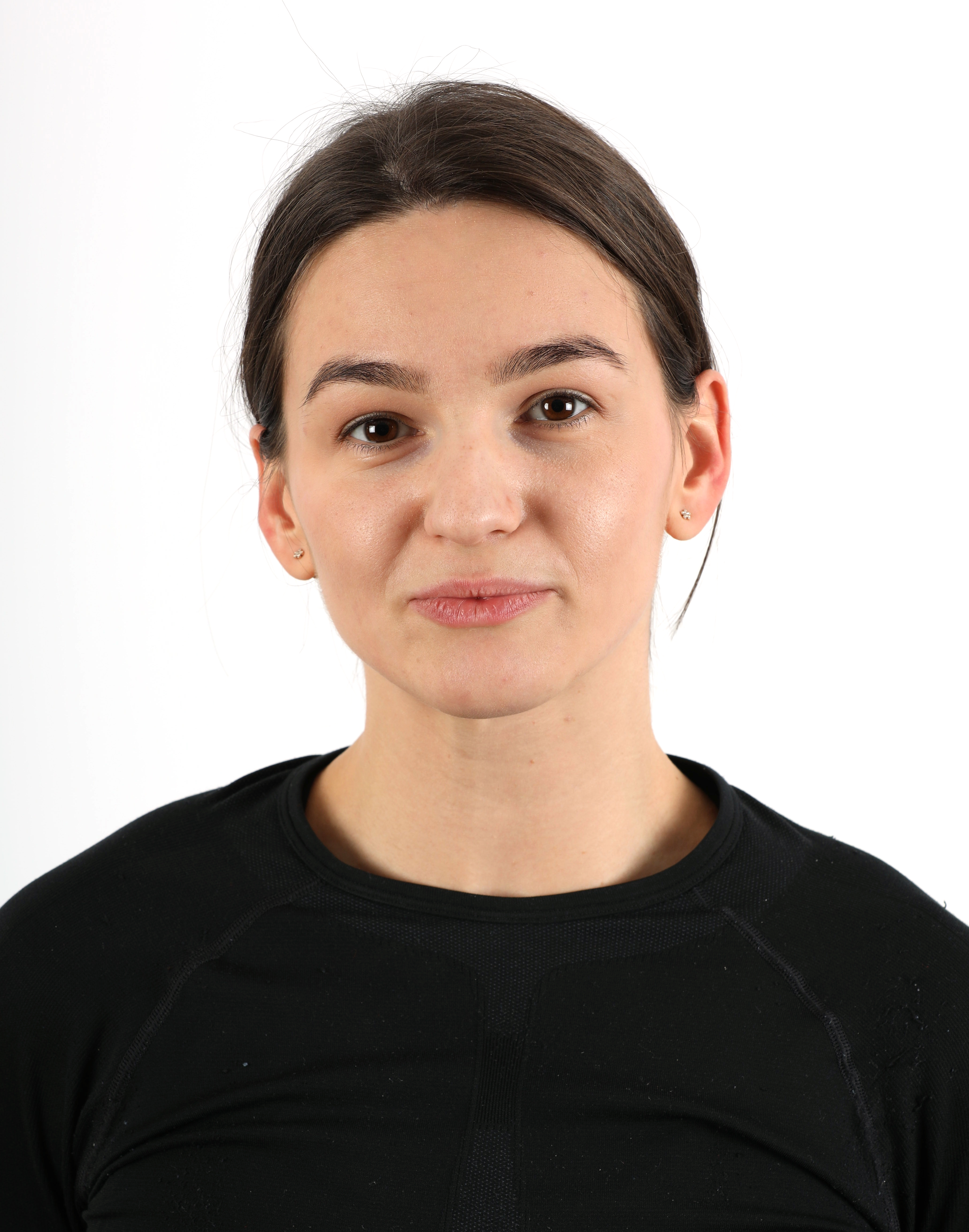
- Katnikova in 2018

Personal information
- Full name: Ekaterina Nikolayevna Katnikova
- Nationality: Russian
- Born: 22 March 1994 (age 32) Chusovoy, Russia
- Height: 1.73 m (5 ft 8 in)
- Weight: 67 kg (148 lb)

Sport
- Country: Russia
- Sport: Luge
- Event: Singles
Medal record
Women's luge
Representing Russia
World Championships
Gold medal – first place	2020 Sochi	Singles
Gold medal – first place	2020 Sochi	Sprint

Ekaterina Nikolayevna Katnikova (Russian: Екатерина Николаевна Катникова; born 22 March 1994) is a Russian luger who has competed since 2014. She is a two-time World Champion.

== Career ==
Katinkova started luging at the age of seven. She had a successful youth and junior career, winning back-to-back bronze medals from 2012 to 2014 and gold at the 2015 U23 World Championships. From 2014 and 2015, she was placed second in the overall classification of the Nation's Cup.

She won the sprint event at the 2020 World Championships, surprisingly surpassing Tatiana Ivanova. She then won another gold medal in singles, becoming only the second Russian and first post-Soviet female luger to do so in this event. In team relay, Katnikova started, but failed to hit the touchpad in the final passage, disqualifying her team from the competition.
