= Hannah Prock =

Austrian luger (born 2000)

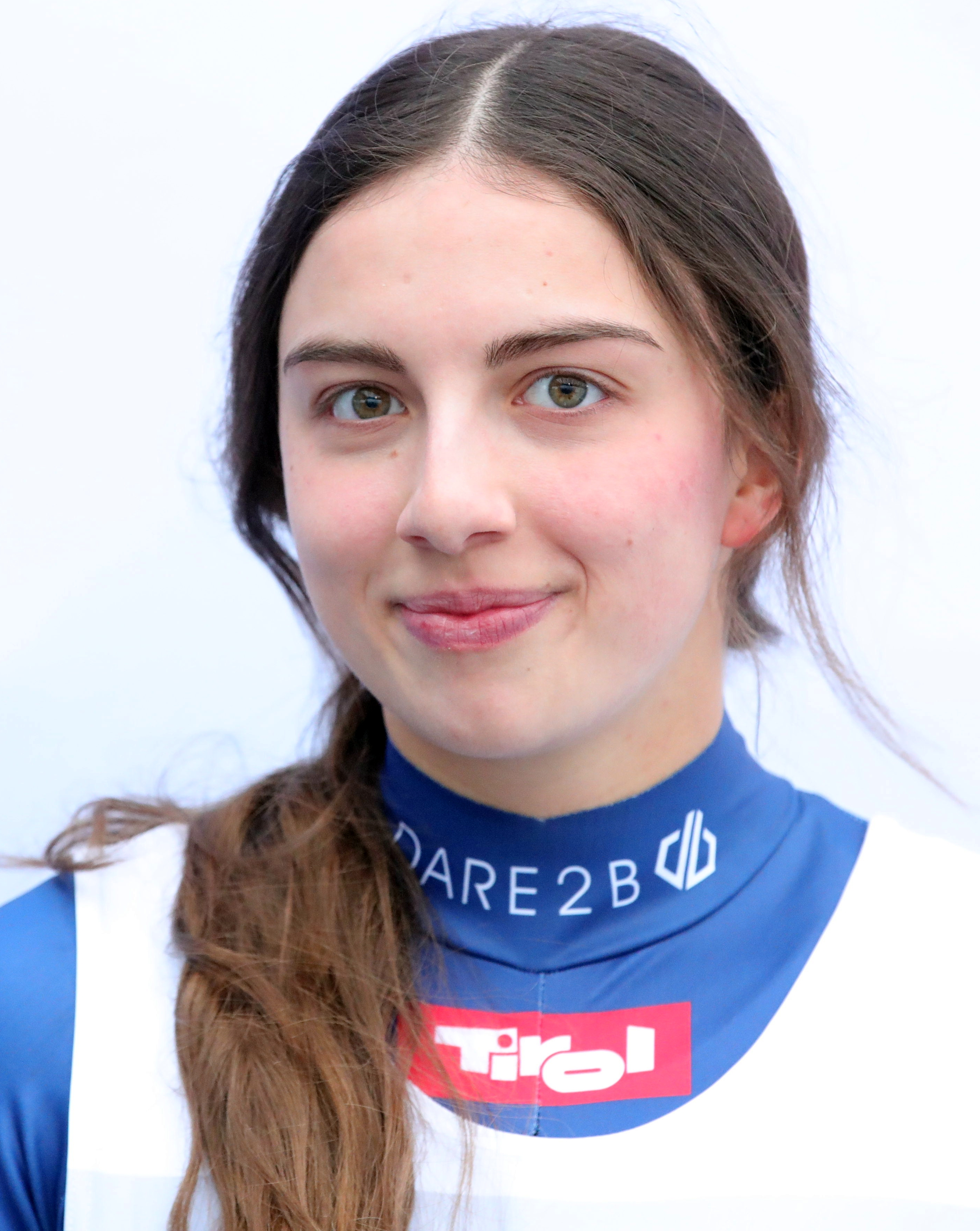
- Prock in 2023

Personal information
- Nationality: Austrian
- Born: 2 February 2000 (age 26) Innsbruck, Tyrol, Austria
- Height: 1.72 m (5 ft 8 in)
- Weight: 64 kg (141 lb)

Sport
- Country: Austria
- Sport: Luge
- Event: Singles
Medal record
World Championships
Silver medal – second place	2019 Winterberg	Team relay

Hannah Prock (born 2 February 2000) is an Austrian luger.

== Professional career ==
She competed in the women's singles event at the 2018 Winter Olympics and 2022 Winter Olympics She took her first podium finish in the Luge World Cup in January 2019 when she finished third at a competition at Königssee.

== Personal life ==
She is the daughter of former luger Markus Prock and the cousin of ski jumper Gregor Schlierenzauer.
