= Katarína Šimoňáková =

Slovak luger

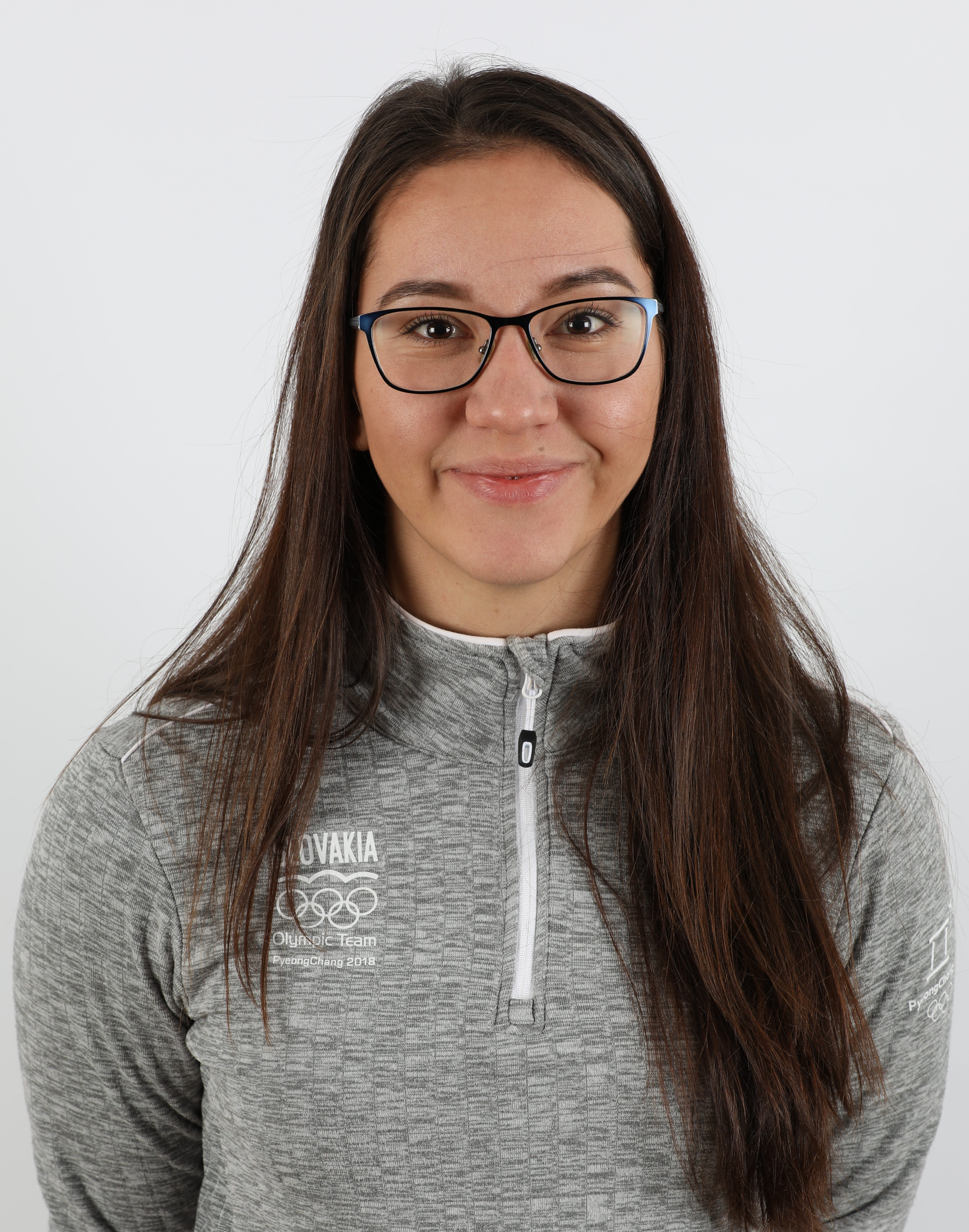
- Šimoňáková in 2018

Personal information
- Nationality: Slovak
- Born: 31 January 1998 (age 27); Spišská Nová Ves, Slovakia

Sport
- Sport: Luge

Katarína Šimoňáková (born 31 January 1998) is a Slovak luger. She competed in the women's singles event at the 2018 Winter Olympics.

Olympic Games
Preceded by Veronika Velez-Zuzulová	Flagbearer for Slovakia; Beijing 2022 together with Marek Hrivík	Succeeded by Incumbent
