= 2019 FIL World Luge Championships =

- Venue: Winterberg bobsleigh, luge, and skeleton track, Winterberg, Germany
- Dates: 25–27 January
- Competitors: 120 from 23 nations

The 2019 FIL World Luge Championships took place under the auspices of the International Luge Federation at the Winterberg bobsleigh, luge, and skeleton track in Winterberg, Germany from 25 to 27 January 2019.

== Schedule ==
Five events were held.

Date	Time	Events
25 January	13:40	Doubles' sprint
25 January	14:35	Women's sprint
25 January	15:30	Men's sprint
26 January	11:10	Doubles
26 January	14:20	Women
27 January	11:05	Men
27 January	15:50	Team relay

== Medal summary ==
=== Medal table ===
* Host nation (Germany)

Rank	Nation	Gold	Silver	Bronze	Total
1	Germany (GER)*	5	5	2	12
2	Austria (AUT)	1	2	2	5
3	Russia (RUS)	1	0	2	3
4	United States (USA)	0	0	1	1
Totals (4 entries)		7	7	7	21

=== Medalists ===
Event	Gold		Silver		Bronze	
Men's singles	Felix Loch; Germany	1:44.250	Reinhard Egger; Austria	1:44.350	Semen Pavlichenko; Russia	1:44.363
Men's sprint	Jonas Müller; Austria	35.835	Felix Loch; Germany	35.859	Semen Pavlichenko; Russia	35.889
Women's singles	Natalie Geisenberger; Germany	1:53.868	Julia Taubitz; Germany	1:54.293	Emily Sweeney; United States	1:54.381
Women's sprint	Natalie Geisenberger; Germany	38.628	Julia Taubitz; Germany	38.635	Dajana Eitberger; Germany	38.668
Doubles	Germany; Toni Eggert; Sascha Benecken	1:27.256	Germany; Tobias Wendl; Tobias Arlt	1:27.334	Austria; Thomas Steu; Lorenz Koller	1:27.397
Doubles' sprint	Germany; Toni Eggert; Sascha Benecken	30.812	Germany; Tobias Wendl; Tobias Arlt	30.824	Austria; Thomas Steu; Lorenz Koller	30.829
Team relay	Russia; Tatiana Ivanova; Semen Pavlichenko; Vladislav Yuzhakov; Yuri Prokhorov	2:24.116	Austria; Hannah Prock; Reinhard Egger; Thomas Steu; Lorenz Koller	2:24.624	Germany; Natalie Geisenberger; Felix Loch; Toni Eggert; Sascha Benecken	2:24.647
