= Winterberg bobsleigh, luge, and skeleton track =

Sports facility in Winterberg, Germany

Coordinates: 51°11′03″N 8°30′24″E

Track map.

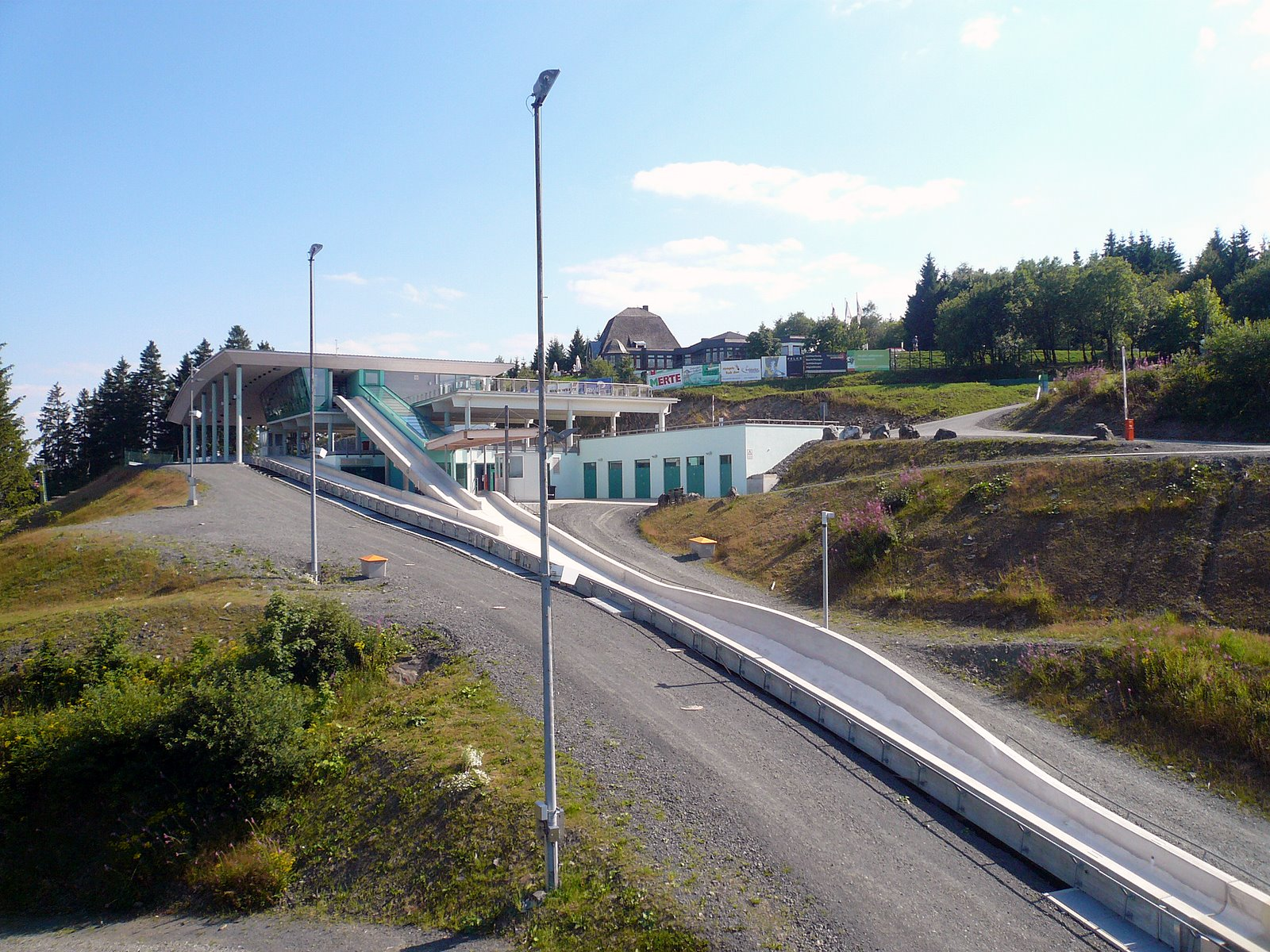
Start house

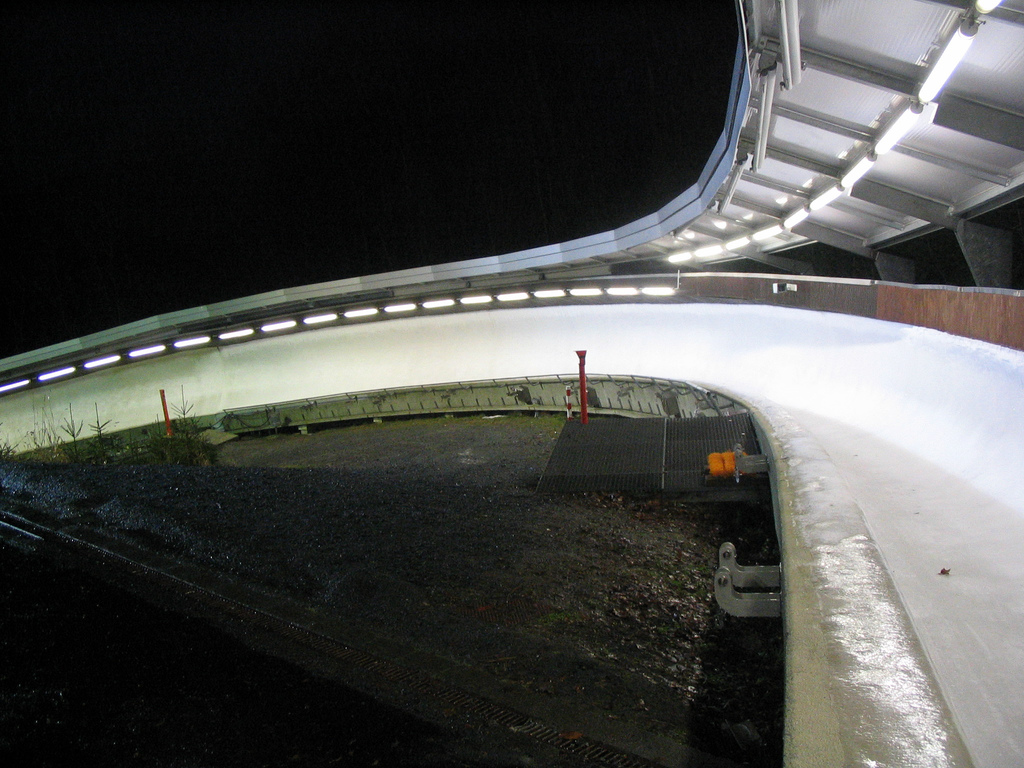
Picture of the Winterberg track Turn 7 at night in December 2006.

The Winterberg bobsleigh, luge, and skeleton track is a bobsleigh, luge, and skeleton track located in Winterberg, Germany. It is the only track of its kind in the world with a turn that has corporate sponsorship with turn seven being sponsored by Veltins, a German brewery which has its headquarters located in neighboring Meschede.

== History ==
Completed in 1977, the track underwent a redesign of its start house area where the women's luge start house was moved from before turn four to near the men's luge start house prior to turn one in 2006. This was done under the auspices of the International Bobsleigh and Tobogganing Federation (FIBT) and the International Luge Federation (FIL) and included a completely covered sled storage area, new changing rooms, and facilities for coaches and officials. The women's singles luge start house was integrated near the men's singles luge start house during the construction. The track hosted the first two-woman bobsleigh world championships in 2000.

== Statistics ==
Physical statistics
Sport	Length	Turns	Vertical drop
Bobsleigh and skeleton	1,330 metres (4,360 ft)	14	110 metres (360 ft)
Luge - men's singles	1,324 metres (4,344 ft)	14	110 metres (360 ft)
Luge - women's singles	1,293 metres (4,242 ft)	14	110 metres (360 ft)
Luge - men's doubles	945 metres (3,100 ft)	11	90 metres (300 ft)

The venue includes a maximum grade of 15% and an average grade of 9.8%

Turn number	Name	Reason named
1, 2, 3	Omega Kurve	After the Omega shape.
7.	Veltins Kreisel	270-degree Kreisel (circular) curve sponsored by Veltins, a German brewery located in neighboring Meschede.
11, 12, 13	Labyrinth (not listed on track map)	Three turns in quick succession without a straight (labyrinth)

Turns 4–6, 8–10 and 14 have no names listed in the track diagram.

Track records
Sport	Record	Nation - athlete(s)	Date	Time (seconds)
Bobsleigh two-man	Start	Germany - Francesco Friedrich & Thorsten Margis	5 December 2015	5.05
Bobsleigh two-man	Track	Germany - Francesco Friedrich & Alexander Schüller	25 February 2024	54.39
Bobsleigh four-man	Start	Germany - Francesco Friedrich, Thorsten Margis, Candy Bauer, & Alexander Schüller	10 January 2021	4.96
Bobsleigh four-man	Track	Germany - Francesco Friedrich, Thorsten Margis, Alexander Schüller, & Felix Straub	3 March 2024	53.11
Bobsleigh two-woman	Start	Canada - Kaillie Humphries, Heather Moyse	12 December 2009	5.54
Bobsleigh two-woman	Track	Germany - Laura Nolte & Deborah Levi	2 March 2024	55.75
Luge - men's singles	Start	Andi Langenhan - Germany	7 December 2007	4.536
Luge - men's singles	Track	Anton Dukach - Ukraine	7 February 2015	52.037
Luge - women's singles	Start	Natalie Geisenberger - Germany	31 October 2009	4.915
Luge - women's singles	Track	Natalie Geisenberger - Germany	14 December 2008	56.192
Luge - men's doubles	Start	Germany - Tobias Wendl & Tobias Arlt	9 January 2010	3.616
Luge - men's doubles	Track	Germany - Walther & Grüneker	10 January 2009	44.106
Skeleton - men	Track	Marcus Wyatt - United Kingdom	23 February 2024	55.26
Skeleton - women	Track	Kimberley Bos - Netherlands	10 December 2021	56.70

== Championships hosted ==
- FIBT World Championships: 1995 (bobsleigh), 2000 (women's bobsleigh), 2003 (women's bobsleigh), 2015 (bobsleigh and skeleton)
- FIL European Luge Championships: 1982, 1992, 2000, 2006
- FIL World Luge Championships: 1989, 1991, 2019
