= List of Polish sports players =

Note: Names that cannot be confirmed in Wikipedia database nor through given sources are subject to removal. If you would like to add a new name please consider writing about the player first.

This is a partial list of Polish sportspeople.

== Alpine skiing ==
- Andrzej Bachleda-Curuś II
- Agnieszka Gąsienica-Daniel
- Maryna Gąsienica-Daniel

== American football ==
- Sebastian Janikowski
- Rob Gronkowski thru ancestry

== Archery ==
- Iwona Dzięcioł
- Katarzyna Klata
- Joanna Nowicka
- Irena Szydłowska

== Athletics ==
- Andrzej Badeński
- Sylwester Bednarek
- Teresa Ciepły
- Kamila Chudzik
- Paweł Czapiewski
- Marian Dudziak
- Leszek Dunecki
- Paweł Fajdek
- Marian Foik
- Halina Górecka
- Zbigniew Jaremski
- Anna Jesień
- Celina Jesionowska
- Jarosława Jóźwiakowska
- Ryszard Katus
- Urszula Kielan
- Ewa Kłobukowska
- Władysław Komar
- Halina Konopacka
- Robert Korzeniowski
- Władysław Kozakiewicz
- Elżbieta Krzesińska
- Zdzisław Krzyszkowiak
- Adam Kszczot
- Andrzej Kupczyk
- Janusz Kusociński
- Maria Kwaśniewska
- Lucyna Langer
- Marcin Lewandowski
- Zenon Licznerski
- Tomasz Majewski
- Piotr Małachowski
- Bronisław Malinowski
- Bogusław Mamiński
- Wiesław Maniak
- Aleksandra Mirosław
- Artur Partyka
- Jerzy Pietrzyk
- Marek Plawgo
- Ryszard Podlas
- Monika Pyrek
- Anna Rogowska
- Tadeusz Rut
- Janusz Sidło
- Kamila Skolimowska
- Tadeusz Ślusarski
- Barbara Sobotta
- Irena Szewińska
- Józef Szmidt
- Jadwiga Wajs
- Stanisława Walasiewicz
- Sebastian Wenta
- Jan Werner
- Joanna Wiśniewska
- Anita Włodarczyk
- Urszula Włodarczyk
- Paweł Wojciechowski
- Marian Woronin
- Jacek Wszoła
- Krystyna Zabawska
- Andrzej Zieliński
- Kazimierz Zimny
- Szymon Ziółkowski
- Krzysztof Zwoliński

== Badminton ==
- Robert Mateusiak
- Nadieżda Zięba

== Basketball ==
- Aleksander Balcerowski
- Agnieszka Bibrzycka
- Aaron Cel
- Margo Dydek
- Aleksander Dziewa
- Jacob Eisner
- Jakub Garbacz
- Marcin Gortat
- Michał Ignerski
- Steve Javie
- Edward Jurkiewicz
- Przemek Karnowski
- Thomas Kelati
- Eugeniusz Kijewski
- Ewelina Kobryn
- Łukasz Kolenda
- Łukasz Koszarek
- Maciej Lampe
- Mieczysław Łopatka
- Dominik Olejniczak
- Andrzej Pluta
- Mateusz Ponitka
- A. J. Slaughter
- Jeremy Sochan
- Michał Sokołowski
- Szymon Szewczyk
- Krzysztof Szubarga
- Cezary Trybański
- Adam Waczyński
- Adam Wójcik

== Beach volleyball ==
- Monika Brzostek
- Grzegorz Fijałek
- Kinga Kołosińska
- Mariusz Prudel

== Biathlon ==
- Józef Gąsienica-Sobczak
- Magdalena Gwizdoń
- Monika Hojnisz
- Zofia Kiełpińska
- Stanisław Łukaszczyk
- Helena Mikołajczyk
- Weronika Nowakowska-Ziemniak
- Krystyna Guzik
- Andrzej Rapacz
- Józef Rubiś
- Tomasz Sikora
- Anna Stera-Kustusz
- Stanisław Szczepaniak

== Bobsleigh ==
- Dawid Kupczyk
- Marcin Niewiara
- Michał Zblewski

== Boxing ==
- Kazimierz Adach
- Tomasz Adamek
- Jerzy Adamski
- Aleksy Antkiewicz
- Wojciech Bartnik
- Brunon Bendig
- Leszek Błażyński
- Zygmunt Chychła
- Stanisław Dragan
- Leszek Drogosz
- Jan Dydak
- Krzysztof Głowacki
- Andrzej Gołota
- Janusz Gortat
- Józef Grudzień
- Józef Grzesiak
- Marian Kasprzyk
- Leszek Kosedowski
- Krzysztof Kosedowski
- Jerzy Kulej
- Dariusz Michalczewski
- Karolina Michalczuk
- Henryk Niedźwiedzki
- Artur Olech
- Kazimierz Paździor
- Henryk Petrich
- Zbigniew Pietrzykowski
- Grzegorz Proksa
- Wiesław Rudkowski
- Jerzy Rybicki
- Grzegorz Skrzecz
- Paweł Skrzecz
- Hubert Skrzypczak
- Jan Szczepański
- Kazimierz Szczerba
- Artur Szpilka
- Mariusz Wach
- Tadeusz Walasek
- Krzysztof Włodarczyk
- Janusz Zarenkiewicz

== Canoeing ==
- Paweł Baraszkiewicz
- Dariusz Białkowski
- Izabela Dylewska
- Marek Dopierała
- Edyta Dzieniszewska
- Maciej Freimut
- Andrzej Gronowicz
- Marcin Grzybowski
- Daniel Jędraszko
- Stefan Kapłaniak
- Krzysztof Kołomański
- Aneta Konieczna
- Grzegorz Kotowicz
- Magdalena Krukowska
- Wojciech Kurpiewski
- Marek Łbik
- Piotr Markiewicz
- Beata Mikołajczyk
- Karolina Naja
- Jerzy Opara
- Rafał Piszcz
- Grzegorz Polaczyk
- Mateusz Polaczyk
- Dariusz Popiela
- Adam Seroczyński
- Piotr Siemionowski
- Beata Sokołowska-Kulesza
- Michał Staniszewski
- Władysław Szuszkiewicz
- Marek Twardowski
- Marta Walczykiewicz
- Daniela Walkowiak-Pilecka
- Marek Witkowski
- Ewelina Wojnarowska
- Władysław Zieliński

== Cross-Country skiing ==
- Sylwia Jaśkowiec
- Justyna Kowalczyk
- Józef Łuszczek
- Jan Staszel

== Cycling ==
- Edward Barcik
- Andrzej Bek
- Joachim Halupczok
- Zenon Jaskuła
- Janusz Kierzkowski
- Benedykt Kocot
- Michał Kwiatkowski
- Czesław Lang
- Józef Lange
- Jan Łazarski
- Marek Leśniewski
- Lucjan Lis
- Rafał Majka
- Tadeusz Mytnik
- Mieczysław Nowicki
- Tomasz Stankiewicz
- Andrzej Sypytkowski
- Stanisław Szozda
- Ryszard Szurkowski
- Franciszek Szymczyk
- Maja Włoszczowska

== Equestrian ==
- Michał Antoniewicz
- Janusz Bobik
- Kazimierz Gzowski
- Wiesław Hartman
- Zdzisław Kawecki
- Jan Kowalczyk
- Marian Kozicki
- Adam Królikiewicz
- Seweryn Kulesza
- Janusz Olech
- Henryk Leliwa-Roycewicz
- Karol Rómmel
- Kazimierz Szosland
- Józef Trenkwald
- Maria Zandbang

== Fencing ==
- Robert Andrzejuk
- Egon Franke
- Sylwia Gruchała
- Piotr Jabłkowski
- Piotr Kiełpikowski
- Adam Krzesiński
- Andrzej Lis
- Tomasz Motyka
- Magdalena Mroczkiewicz
- Jerzy Pawłowski
- Anna Rybicka
- Cezary Siess
- Ryszard Sobczak
- Aleksandra Socha
- Mariusz Strzałka
- Leszek Swornowski
- Marian Sypniewski
- Adam Wiercioch
- Barbara Wolnicka-Szewczyk
- Witold Woyda
- Radosław Zawrotniak

== Field hockey ==
- Tomasz Choczaj
- Tomasz Cichy
- Eugeniusz Gaczkowski
- Rafał Grotowski
- Robert Grzeszczak
- Paweł Jakubiak
- Zbigniew Juszczak
- Aleksander Korcz
- Dariusz Małecki
- Dariusz Marcinkowski
- Piotr Mikuła
- Marcin Pobuta
- Paweł Sobczak
- Tomasz Szmidt
- Krzysztof Wybieralski
- Łukasz Wybieralski

== Figure skating ==
- Grzegorz Filipowski
- Mariusz Siudek
- Dorota Zagórska

== Football ==
- Jakub Błaszczykowski
- Zbigniew Boniek
- Artur Boruc
- Kazimierz Deyna
- Jan Domarski
- Jerzy Dudek
- Marek Fundakowski (born 1988), striker
- Paul Freier (Polish born)
- Robert Gadocha
- Łukasz Garguła
- Jerzy Gorgoń
- Kazimierz Górski
- Paweł Janas
- Stan Javie
- Andrzej Juskowiak
- Jacek Krzynówek
- Zbigniew Kaczmarek
- Henryk Kasperczak
- Miroslav Klose (Mirosław Klose, Polish born)
- Hubert Kostka
- Józef Klotz (1900–1941)
- Wojciech Krauze
- Grzegorz Lato
- Robert Lewandowski
- Włodzimierz Lubański
- Józef Młynarczyk
- Piotr Nowak
- Emmanuel Olisadebe
- Łukasz Piszczek
- Lukas Podolski (Łukasz Podolski, Polish born)
- Tomasz Radzinski (Polish born)
- Grzegorz Rasiak
- Marek Saganowski
- Ebi Smolarek
- Włodzimierz Smolarek
- Andrzej Szarmach
- Jan Tomaszewski
- Władysław Żmuda
- Maciej Żurawski

== Formula one ==
- Robert Kubica

== Freestyle skiing ==
- Karolina Riemen

== Gymnastics ==
- Leszek Blanik
- Jerzy Jokiel
- Natalia Kot
- Joanna Mitrosz
- Helena Rakoczy

== Handball ==
- Zdzisław Antczak
- Karol Bielecki
- Janusz Brzozowski
- Kinga Byzdra
- Piotr Cieśla
- Jan Gmyrek
- Mateusz Jachlewski
- Mariusz Jurasik
- Bartosz Jurecki
- Michał Jurecki
- Alfred Kałuziński
- Jerzy Klempel
- Patryk Kuchczyński
- Zygfryd Kuchta
- Karolina Kudłacz
- Zbigniew Kwiatkowski
- Krzysztof Lijewski
- Marcin Lijewski
- Jerzy Melcer
- Ryszard Przybysz
- Henryk Rozmiarek
- Artur Siódmiak
- Andrzej Sokołowski
- Sławomir Szmal
- Karolina Szwed-Orneborg
- Andrzej Szymczak
- Grzegorz Tkaczyk
- Tomasz Tłuczyński
- Adam Weiner
- Bogdan Wenta
- Damian Wleklak
- Mieczysław Wojczak
- Alina Wojtas
- Włodzimierz Zieliński

== Ice hockey ==
- Mariusz Czerkawski
- Krzysztof Oliwa
- Wojtek Wolski

== Judo ==
- Rafał Kubacki
- Waldemar Legień
- Beata Maksymow
- Paweł Nastula
- Janusz Pawłowski
- Aneta Szczepańska
- Paweł Zagrodnik
- Janusz Wojnarowicz

== Luge ==
- Helena Boettcher
- Edward Fender
- Barbara Gorgoń
- Jerzy Koszla
- Lucjan Kudzia
- Maciej Kurowski
- Andrzej Laszczak
- Krzysztof Niewiadomski
- Danuta Nycz
- Mieczysław Pawełkiewicz
- Irena Pawełczyk
- Ryszard Pędrak-Janowicz
- Barbara Piecha
- Oktawian Samulski
- Maria Semczyszak
- Janina Susczewska
- Damian Waniczek
- Jerzy Wojnar

== MMA ==
- Jan Blachowicz
- Mamed Khalidov
- Marcin Held
- Damian grabowski
- Krzysztof Soszynski

== Modern pentathlon ==
- Maciej Czyżowicz
- Dariusz Goździak
- Dorota Idzi
- Janusz Pyciak-Peciak
- Arkadiusz Skrzypaszek

== Motorboat ==
- Bernard Marszałek

== Mountaineering ==
- Jerzy Kukuczka
- Piotr Pustelnik
- Wanda Rutkiewicz
- Krzysztof Wielicki

== Nordic combined ==
- Franciszek Gąsienica Groń
- Stefan Hula, Sr.

== Rallying ==
- Kuba Giermaziak
- Janusz Kulig
- Sobiesław Zasada

== Rowing ==
- Miłosz Bernatajtys
- Kajetan Broniewski
- Michał Cieślak
- Małgorzata Dłużewska
- Magdalena Fularczyk
- Wojciech Jankowski
- Michał Jeliński
- Teodor Kocerka
- Marek Kolbowicz
- Adam Korol
- Czesława Kościańska
- Tomasz Kucharski
- Maciej Łasicki
- Julia Michalska
- Bartłomiej Pawełczak
- Łukasz Pawłowski
- Paweł Rańda
- Jacek Streich
- Robert Sycz
- Tomasz Tomiak
- Konrad Wasielewski

== Sailing ==
- Mateusz Kusznierewicz
- Przemysław Miarczyński
- Zofia Noceti-Klepacka

== Shooting ==
- Sylwia Bogacka
- Władysław Karaś
- Małgorzata Książkiewicz
- Renata Mauer
- Mirosław Rzepkowski
- Adam Smelczyński
- Józef Zapędzki

== Ski jumping ==
- Stanisław Bobak
- Piotr Fijas
- Wojciech Fortuna
- Stanisław Gąsienica Daniel
- Stefan Hula
- Maciej Kot
- Dawid Kubacki
- Antoni Łaciak
- Adam Małysz
- Stanisław Marusarz
- Andrzej Stękała
- Kamil Stoch
- Piotr Żyła

== Snowboarding ==
- Paulina Ligocka
- Jagna Marczułajtis

== Speed skating ==
- Zbigniew Bródka
- Katarzyna Bachleda-Curuś
- Natalia Czerwonka
- Konrad Niedźwiedzki
- Helena Pilejczyk
- Erwina Ryś-Ferens
- Elwira Seroczyńska
- Jan Szymański
- Katarzyna Woźniak
- Luiza Złotkowska

== Speedway ==
- Tomasz Gollob
- Jarosław Hampel
- Edward Jancarz
- Jerzy Szczakiel
- Andrzej Wyglenda
- Bartosz Zmarzlik

== Strongman ==
- Mateusz Kieliszkowski
- Sławomir Orzeł
- Mariusz Pudzianowski

== Swimming ==
- Konrad Czerniak
- Agnieszka Czopek
- Otylia Jędrzejczak
- Radosław Kawęcki
- Paweł Korzeniowski
- Mateusz Sawrymowicz
- Rafał Szukała
- Artur Wojdat

== Table tennis ==
- Andrzej Grubba
- Natalia Partyka

== Tennis ==
- Marta Domachowska
- Wojtek Fibak
- Mariusz Fyrstenberg
- Hubert Hurkacz
- Jerzy Janowicz
- Jadwiga Jędrzejowska
- Angelique Kerber (Andżelika Kerber, Polish born)
- Łukasz Kubot
- Magda Linette
- Marcin Matkowski
- Michał Przysiężny
- Agnieszka Radwańska
- Urszula Radwańska
- Iga Świątek
- Bohdan Tomaszewski

== Volleyball ==
- Halina Aszkiełowicz
- Natalia Bamber
- Zbigniew Bartman
- Bronisław Bebel
- Agnieszka Bednarek-Kasza
- Izabela Bełcik
- Ryszard Bosek
- Hanna Busz
- Lidia Chmielnicka
- Krystyna Czajkowska
- Eleonora Dziękiewicz
- Katarzyna Gajgał
- Wiesław Gawłowski
- Małgorzata Glinka
- Maria Golimowska
- Piotr Gruszka
- Krzysztof Ignaczak
- Aleksandra Jagieło
- Krystyna Jakubowska
- Jakub Jarosz
- Joanna Kaczor
- Klaudia Kaczorowska
- Marek Karbarz
- Danuta Kordaczuk
- Grzegorz Kosok
- Krystyna Krupa
- Jadwiga Książek
- Michał Kubiak
- Bartosz Kurek
- Lech Łasko
- Józefa Ledwig
- Dominika Leśniewicz
- Maria Liktoras
- Zbigniew Lubiejewski
- Paulina Maj
- Joanna Mirek
- Marcin Możdżonek
- Agata Mróz-Olszewska
- Barbara Niemczyk
- Piotr Nowakowski
- Krystyna Ostromęcka
- Anna Podolec
- Elżbieta Porzec
- Sylwia Pycia
- Milena Rosner
- Michał Ruciak
- Jadwiga Rutkowska
- Mirosław Rybaczewski
- Włodzimierz Sadalski
- Milena Sadurek
- Edward Skorek
- Katarzyna Skowrońska
- Magdalena Śliwa
- Maria Śliwka
- Włodzimierz Stefański
- Sebastian Świderski
- Dorota Świeniewicz
- Zofia Szczęśniewska
- Anna Werblińska
- Wanda Wiecha
- Michał Winiarski
- Łukasz Wiśniewski
- Mariusz Wlazły
- Tomasz Wójtowicz
- Paweł Zagumny
- Zbigniew Zarzycki
- Paweł Zatorski
- Mariola Zenik
- Łukasz Żygadło
- Wilfredo Leon

== Weightlifting ==
- Waldemar Baszanowski
- Jan Bochenek
- Bartłomiej Bonk
- Kazimierz Czarnecki
- Grzegorz Cziura
- Marcin Dołęga
- Marek Gołąb
- Zbigniew Kaczmarek
- Szymon Kołecki
- Waldemar Malak
- Mieczysław Nowak
- Norbert Ozimek
- Ireneusz Paliński
- Tadeusz Rutkowski
- Norbert Schemansky
- Marek Seweryn
- Zygmunt Smalcerz
- Stanley Stanczyk
- Henryk Trębicki
- Agata Wróbel
- Adrian Zieliński
- Marian Zieliński

== Wrestling ==
- Roman Bierła
- Jan Dołgowicz
- Jacek Fafiński
- Marek Garmulewicz
- Andrzej Głąb
- Damian Janikowski
- Józef Lipień
- Kazimierz Lipień
- Monika Michalik
- Adam Sandurski
- Władysław Stecyk
- Piotr Stępień
- Andrzej Supron
- Józef Tracz
- Agnieszka Wieszczek
- Ryszard Wolny
- Andrzej Wroński
- Włodzimierz Zawadzki
- Józef Bednarski

== See also ==
- Poland at the Olympics
- Poland at the Paralympics
- Sport in Poland
