= Poland at the 1964 Winter Olympics =

- IOC code: POL
- NOC: Polish Olympic Committee
- Website: www.pkol.pl (in Polish)

in Innsbruck
- Competitors: 51 (40 men, 11 women) in 8 sports
- Flag bearers: Jerzy Wojnar, Luge
- Medals: Gold 0 Silver 0 Bronze 0 Total 0

Winter Olympics appearances (overview)
- 1924; 1928; 1932; 1936; 1948; 1952; 1956; 1960; 1964; 1968; 1972; 1976; 1980; 1984; 1988; 1992; 1994; 1998; 2002; 2006; 2010; 2014; 2018; 2022; 2026

Poland competed at the 1964 Winter Olympics in Innsbruck, Austria.

== Alpine skiing ==
Men

Athlete	Event	Race	
Athlete	Event	Time	Rank
Andrzej Dereziński	Downhill	2:35.89	49
Bronisław Trzebunia	Downhill	2:32.29	40
Jerzy Woyna Orlewicz	Downhill	2:25.88	24
Andrzej Dereziński	Giant Slalom	DSQ	–
Jerzy Woyna Orlewicz	Giant Slalom	2:06.44	41
Bronisław Trzebunia	Giant Slalom	1:59.82	29

Men's slalom

Athlete	Qualifying				Final					
Athlete	Time 1	Rank	Time 2	Rank	Time 1	Rank	Time 2	Rank	Total	Rank
Bronisław Trzebunia	57.72	38	56.55	13 QF	1:16.27	27	1:06.46	26	2:22.73	27
Andrzej Dereziński	56.75	35	56.66	14 QF	1:18.21	30	1:09.30	34	2:27.51	33
Jerzy Woyna Orlewicz	54.55	17 QF	–	–	1:18.31	31	1:06.68	28	2:24.99	30

Women

Athlete	Event	Race 1		Race 2		Total	
Athlete	Event	Time	Rank	Time	Rank	Time	Rank
Maria Gąsienica Daniel-Szatkowska	Downhill					2:11.75	41
Maria Gąsienica Daniel-Szatkowska	Giant Slalom					2:10.20	36
Maria Gąsienica Daniel-Szatkowska	Slalom	DSQ	–	–	–	DSQ	–

== Biathlon ==
Men

Event	Athlete	Time	Misses	Adjusted time ^{1}	Rank
20 km	Stanisław Styrczula	1'32:52.1	4	1'40:52.1	35
20 km	Józef Gąsienica-Sobczak	1'22:00.6	6	1'34:00.6	20
20 km	Stanisław Szczepaniak	1'27:43.5	3	1'33:43.5	18
20 km	Józef Rubiś	1'22:31.6	2	1'26:31.6	6

^{1} Two minutes added per miss.

== Cross-country skiing ==
Men

Event	Athlete	Race	
Event	Athlete	Time	Rank
15 km	Józef Gut Misiaga	57:27.1	45
15 km	Tadeusz Jankowski	55:57.2	33
15 km	Edward Budny	55:35.2	28
15 km	Józef Rysula	54:09.4	21
30 km	Henryk Marek	DSQ	–
30 km	Tadeusz Jankowski	1'42:34.0	40
30 km	Alfons Dorner	1'41:31.9	35
30 km	Józef Rysula	1'38:29.1	24

Men's 4 × 10 km relay

Athletes	Race	
Athletes	Time	Rank
Józef Gut Misiaga; Tadeusz Jankowski; Edward Budny; Józef Rysula	2'27:27.0	8

Women

Event	Athlete	Race	
Event	Athlete	Time	Rank
5 km	Weronika Budny	21:07.1	27
5 km	Czesława Stopka	20:34.4	24
5 km	Teresa Trzebunia	20:25.8	23
5 km	Stefania Biegun	19:16.0	14
10 km	Teresa Trzebunia	47:20.3	24
10 km	Czesława Stopka	46:57.1	23
10 km	Stefania Biegun	44:45.0	18

Women's 3 x 5 km relay

Athletes	Race	
Athletes	Time	Rank
Teresa Trzebunia; Czesława Stopka; Stefania Biegun	1'08:55.4	7

== Ice hockey ==
=== First round ===
Winners (in bold) qualified for the Group A to play for 1st-8th places. Teams, which lost their qualification matches, played in Group B for 9th-16th places.

Team 1	Score	Team 2
**Germany**	2–1	Poland

=== Consolation round ===
Rank	Team	Pld	W	L	T	GF	GA	Pts
9	Poland	7	6	1	0	40	13	12
10	Norway	7	5	2	0	40	19	10
11	Japan	7	4	2	1	35	31	9
12	Romania	7	3	3	1	31	28	7
13	Austria	7	3	3	1	24	28	7
14	Yugoslavia	7	3	3	1	29	37	7
15	Italy	7	2	5	0	24	42	4
16	Hungary	7	0	7	0	14	39	0

- Poland 6-1 Romania
- Poland 4-2 Norway
- Poland 6-2 Hungary
- Poland 7-0 Italy
- Japan 4-3 Poland
- Poland 9-3 Yugoslavia
- Austria 1-5 Poland

**Contestants**; Andrzej Fonfara; Bronisław Gosztyła; Henryk Handy; Tadeusz Kilanowicz; Józef Kurek; Gerard Langner; Józef Manowski; Jerzy Ogórczyk; Stanisław Olczyk; Władysław Pabisz; Hubert Sitko; Augustyn Skórski; Józef Stefaniak; Andrzej Szal; Sylwester Wilczek; Józef Wiśniewski; Andrzej Żurawski

== Luge ==
Men

Athlete	Run 1		Run 2		Run 3		Run 4		Total	
Athlete	Time	Rank	Time	Rank	Time	Rank	Time	Rank	Time	Rank
Edward Fender	DNF	–	–	–	–	–	–	–	DNF	–
Jerzy Wojnar	1:04.47	33	53.14	10	1:10.72	31	1:03.36	29	4:11.69	28
Mieczysław Pawełkiewicz	54.00	14	52.70	5	52.66	6	53.66	10	3:33.02	6
Lucjan Kudzia	53.11	9	55.44	21	52.36	4	53.51	8	3:34.42	11

(Men's) Doubles

Athletes	Run 1		Run 2		Total	
Athletes	Time	Rank	Time	Rank	Time	Rank
Lucjan Kudzia; Ryszard Pędrak	51.95	6	51.82	5	1:43.77	5
Edward Fender; Mieczysław Pawełkiewicz	52.60	9	52.53	7	1:45.13	7

Women

Athlete	Run 1		Run 2		Run 3		Run 4		Total	
Athlete	Time	Rank	Time	Rank	Time	Rank	Time	Rank	Time	Rank
Barbara Gorgoń-Flont	54.24	9	53.01	6	52.46	6	53.02	5	3:32.73	5
Helena Macher	53.15	6	54.50	9	54.55	9	53.67	8	3:35.87	8
Irena Pawełczyk	52.81	5	52.42	4	52.47	7	52.82	4	3:30.52	4

== Nordic combined ==
Events:

- normal hill ski jumping (Three jumps, best two counted and shown here.)
- 15 km cross-country skiing

Athlete	Event	Ski Jumping				Cross-country			Total	
Athlete	Event	Distance 1	Distance 2	Points	Rank	Time	Points	Rank	Points	Rank
Erwin Feidor	Individual	68.0	72.0	219.1	8	54:41.3	187.06	19	406.16	14

== Ski jumping ==
Athletes performed three jumps, the best two were counted and are shown here.

Athlete	Event	Jump 1		Jump 2		Total	
Athlete	Event	Distance	Points	Distance	Points	Points	Rank
Ryszard Witke	Normal hill	73.5	94.5	72.0	91.6	186.1	45
Antoni Łaciak	Normal hill	72.5	95.1	74.0	99.2	194.3	34
Piotr Wala	Normal hill	75.0	101.1	74.0	100.9	201.0	22
Józef Przybyła	Normal hill	78.0	104.5	74.0	98.7	203.2	18
Ryszard Witke	Large hill	86.0	96.4	74.0	90.9	187.3	35
Andrzej Sztolf	Large hill	85.0	96.7	79.5	99.5	196.2	26
Józef Przybyła	Large hill	92.0	106.1	87.5	105.2	211.3	9
Piotr Wala	Large hill	86.5	97.0	88.0	105.9	205.5	15

== Speed skating ==
Women

Event	Athlete	Race	
Event	Athlete	Time	Rank
500 m	Helena Pilejczyk	50.1	23
500 m	Adelajda Mroske	49.9	22
500 m	Elwira Seroczyńska	48.8	16
1000 m	Elwira Seroczyńska	1:42.1	22
1000 m	Adelajda Mroske	1:41.7	21
1000 m	Helena Pilejczyk	1:39.8	15
1500 m	Elwira Seroczyńska	2:39.3	26
1500 m	Helena Pilejczyk	2:38.3	25
1500 m	Adelajda Mroske	2:36.4	22
3000 m	Helena Pilejczyk	5:47.3	26
3000 m	Adelajda Mroske	5:47.1	25
