= Poland at the 1960 Winter Olympics =

- IOC code: POL
- NOC: Polish Olympic Committee
- Website: www.pkol.pl (in Polish)

in Squaw Valley
- Competitors: 13 (7 men, 6 women) in 4 sports
- Flag bearer: Józef Karpiel
- Medals Ranked 11th: Gold 0 Silver 1 Bronze 1 Total 2

Winter Olympics appearances (overview)
- 1924; 1928; 1932; 1936; 1948; 1952; 1956; 1960; 1964; 1968; 1972; 1976; 1980; 1984; 1988; 1992; 1994; 1998; 2002; 2006; 2010; 2014; 2018; 2022; 2026

Poland participated at the 1960 Winter Olympics in Squaw Valley, United States, held between 18 and 28 February 1960. The country's participation in the Games marked its eighth appearance at the Winter Olympics since its debut in the 1924 Games.

The Polish team consisted of 13 athletes including six women who competed across four sports. Skier Józef Karpiel was the country's flag-bearer during the opening ceremony. Poland was ranked eleventh in the overall medal table with two medals including a silver and a bronze.

== Background ==
Poland first competed at the Winter Olympics in the inaugural 1924 Games held in Chamonix, France. The nation's participation in the 1960 Winter Olympics marked its eighth consecutive appearance at the Winter Olympics since its debut.

The 1960 Winter Olympics were held in Squaw Valley, United States between 18 and 28 February 1960. The Polish team consisted of 13 athletes including six women who competed across four sports. Skier Józef Karpiel was the country's flag-bearer during the opening ceremony.

== Medalists ==
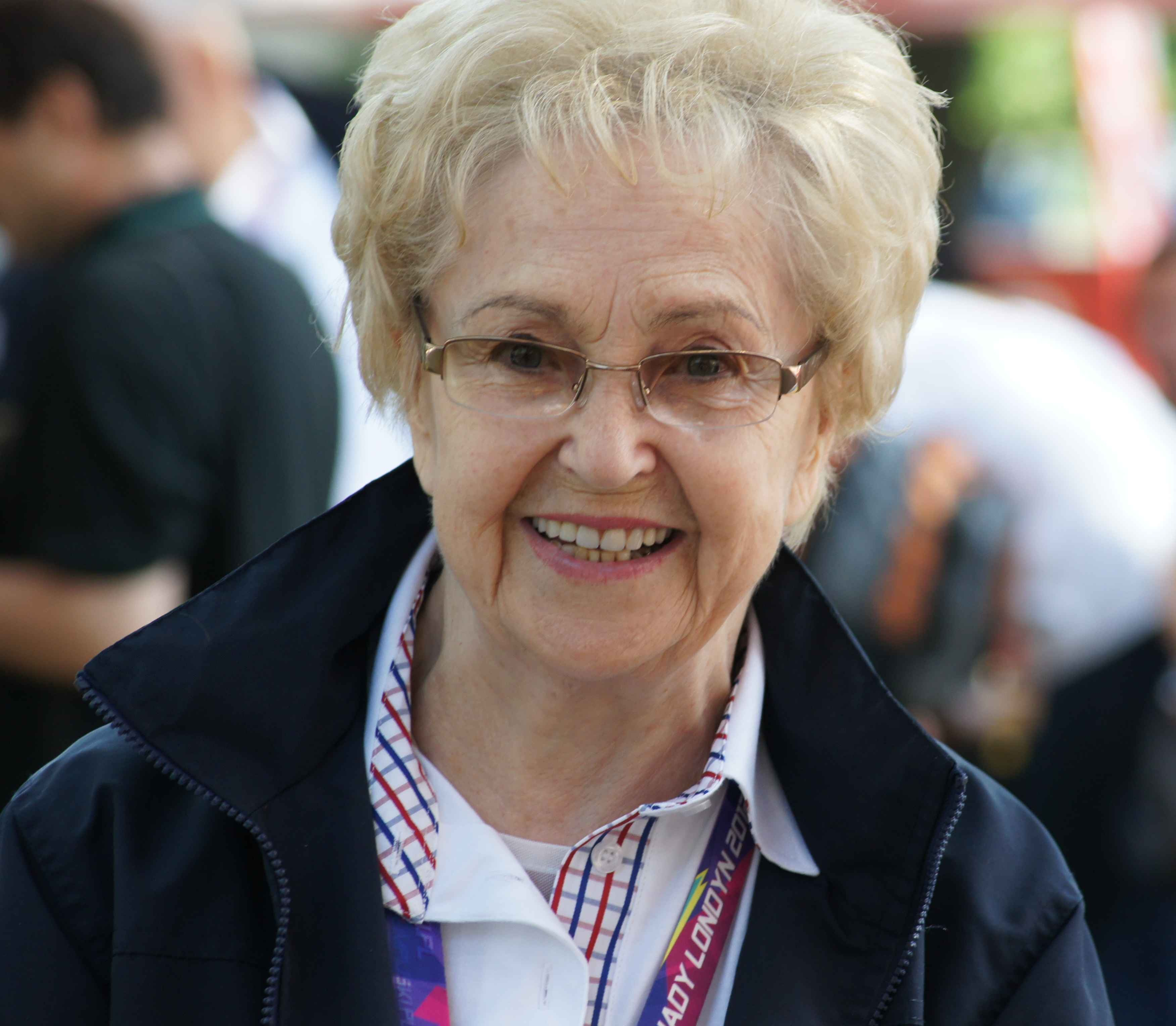
Helena Pilejczyk won the bronze medal

Poland was ranked eleventh in the overall medal table with two medals including a silver and a bronze. The country won both medals in the same speed skating event.

Medal	Name	Sport	Event
Silver	Elwira Seroczyńska	Speed skating	Women's 1500 m
Bronze	Helena Pilejczyk	Speed skating	Women's 1500 m

== Competitors ==
There were 13 athletes including six women who took part in the medal events across six sports.

Sport	Men	Women	Athletes
Cross-country skiing	5	3	8
Nordic combined	1	0	1
Ski jumping	1	0	1
Speed skating	0	3	3
Total	7	6	13

== Cross-country skiing ==
The cross-country skiing events took place between 19 and 27 February 1960 and consisted of six medal events. Poland sent the highest number of athletes (eight) to compete in the sport. In the individual events, Józef Rysula recorded the best finish in 18th place in the men's 15 km event with a best time of 54 minutes and 13.3 seconds. The women's and men's relay team were ranked fourth and sixth in the overall classification respectively.

Men

Event	Athlete	Race	
Event	Athlete	Time	Rank
Andrzej Mateja	Men's 15 km	58:09.1	43
Józef Gut Misiaga	Men's 15 km	58:03.6	41
Józef Rysula	Men's 15 km	54:13.3	18
Kazimierz Zelek	Men's 15 km	55:59.4	28
Andrzej Mateja	Men's 30 km	2'01:54.7	23
Józef Gąsienica-Sobczak	Men's 30 km	2'06:12.7	34
Kazimierz Zelek	Men's 30 km	2'01:27.1	22
Andrzej Mateja	Men's 50 km	DNF	–
Andrzej Mateja; Józef Gut Misiaga; Józef Rysula; Kazimierz Zelek	Men's 4 x 10 km relay	2'26:25.3	6

Women

Event	Athlete	Race	
Event	Athlete	Time	Rank
Anna Krzeptowska-Żebracka	Women's 10 km	44:36.1	20
Helena Gąsienica Daniel	Women's 10 km	45:08.2	21
Józefa Czerniawska-Pęksa	Women's 10 km	42:45.5	14
Stefania Biegun	Women's 10 km	42:45.5	13
Helena Gąsienica Daniel; Józefa Czerniawska-Pęksa; Stefania Biegun	Women's 3 x 5 km relay	1'07:24.6	4

== Nordic combined ==
The Nordic combined event consisted of ski jumping and 15 km (9.3 mi) cross-country skiing. It was held between 22 and 24 February at Olympic Jumping Hill. The lone competitor Józef Karpiel finished in 19th place.

Athlete	Event	Ski Jumping				Cross-country			Total	
Athlete	Event	Distance 1	Distance 2	Points	Rank	Time	Points	Rank	Points	Rank
Józef Karpiel	Individual	56.5	65.0	194.5	25	1'02:14.0	225.484	16	419.984	19

== Ski jumping ==
Ski jumping event was held on 21 February at Olympic Jumping Hill. Austria had four entrants to the competition. The lone competitor Władysław Tajner 31st with a combined score of 188.2.

Athlete	Event	Jump 1			Jump 2			Total	
Athlete	Event	Distance	Points	Rank	Distance	Points	Rank	Points	Rank
Władysław Tajner	Normal hill	78.5	87.6	39	79.5	100.6	23	188.2	31

== Speed skating ==
Speed skating events were held at the Speed Skating Oval. The sport resulted in the best haul of medals for Poland with a silver and a bronze each. In the women's 1,500 m event, Elwira Seroczyńska won silver and Helena Pilejczyk won the bronze medal.

Event	Athlete	Race	
Event	Athlete	Time	Rank
Elwira Seroczyńska	Women's 500 m	46.8	6
Helena Pilejczyk	Women's 500 m	48.2	12
Elwira Seroczyńska	Women's 1,000 m	DNF	–
Helena Pilejczyk	Women's 1,000 m	1:35.8	5
Elwira Seroczyńska	Women's 1,500 m	2:25.7	2nd place, silver medalist(s)
Helena Pilejczyk	Women's 1,500 m	2:27.1	3rd place, bronze medalist(s)
Elwira Seroczyńska	Women's 3,000 m	5:27.3	7
Helena Pilejczyk	Women's 3,000 m	5:26.2	6
