= Luge at the 1964 Winter Olympics – Women's singles =

Women's singles at the IX Olympic Winter Games
- Venue: Olympic Sliding Centre Innsbruck
- Dates: 30 January – 4 February 1964
- Competitors: 17 from 7 nations
- Winning time: 3:24.67

Medalists
1st place, gold medalist(s)		Ortrun Enderlein	United Team of Germany
2nd place, silver medalist(s)		Ilse Geisler	United Team of Germany
3rd place, bronze medalist(s)		Leni Thurner	Austria

The Women's singles luge competition at the 1964 Winter Olympics in Innsbruck was held from 30 January to 4 February, at Olympic Sliding Centre Innsbruck.

== Results ==
Rank	Athlete	Country	Run 1	Run 2	Run 3	Run 4	Total
1st place, gold medalist(s)	Ortrun Enderlein	United Team of Germany	51.13	51.12	50.87	51.55	3:24.67
2nd place, silver medalist(s)	Ilse Geisler	United Team of Germany	51.28	51.48	51.20	53.46	3:27.42
3rd place, bronze medalist(s)	Leni Thurner	Austria	52.08	52.08	52.42	52.48	3:29.06
4	Irena Pawełczyk	Poland	52.81	52.42	52.47	52.82	3:30.52
5	Barbara Gorgoń-Flont	Poland	54.24	53.01	52.46	53.02	3:32.73
6	Olina Hátlová-Tylová	Czechoslovakia	51.37	57.94	51.65	51.80	3:32.76
7	Friederike Matejka	Austria	53.61	52.98	53.94	54.15	3:34.68
8	Helena Macher	Poland	53.15	54.50	54.55	53.67	3:35.87
9	Hana Nesvadbová	Czechoslovakia	53.56	53.45	54.67	54.42	3:36.10
10	Minna Blüml	United Team of Germany	56.87	53.80	52.33	53.32	3:36.32
11	Ursula Amstein	Switzerland	54.25	56.58	55.90	56.08	3:42.81
12	Elisabeth Nagele	Switzerland	55.28	55.10	57.61	55.30	3:43.29
13	Erica Prugger	Italy	55.24	87.28	54.98	55.69	4:13.19
-	Erica Außendorfer	Italy	56.03	?	?	DNF	-
-	Antonia Lanthaler	Austria	54.30	DNF	-	-	-
-	Monika Lücker	Switzerland	55.35	DNF	-	-	-
-	Dorothy Hirschland	United States	86.06	DNS	-	-	-
