= Mahlknecht =

Mahlknecht is a surname. Notable people with the surname include:

- Beatrix Mahlknecht, Italian luger
- Erhard Mahlknecht, Italian luger
- Ivo Mahlknecht (1939–2020), Italian alpine skier
- Ulrich Mahlknecht (born 1967), German-Italian scientist
