= List of flag bearers for Poland at the Olympics =

Poland at the Olympics
- IOC code: POL
- NOC: Polish Olympic Committee
- Website: www.olimpijski.pl (in Polish)
- Medals: Gold 80 Silver 100 Bronze 151 Total 331

Summer appearances
- 1924; 1928; 1932; 1936; 1948; 1952; 1956; 1960; 1964; 1968; 1972; 1976; 1980; 1984; 1988; 1992; 1996; 2000; 2004; 2008; 2012; 2016; 2020; 2024

Winter appearances
- 1924; 1928; 1932; 1936; 1948; 1952; 1956; 1960; 1964; 1968; 1972; 1976; 1980; 1984; 1988; 1992; 1994; 1998; 2002; 2006; 2010; 2014; 2018; 2022; 2026

Other related appearances
- Russian Empire (1900, 1912); Austria (1908–1912)

This is a list of flag bearers who have represented Poland at the Olympics.

Flag bearers carry the national flag of their country at the opening ceremony of the Olympic Games.

#	Event year	Season	Flag bearer	Sport	Ref.
1	1924	Winter	Kazimierz Smogorzewski	Official (journalist)	
2	1924	Summer	Sławosz Szydłowski	Athletics	
3	1928	Winter	Andrzej Krzeptowski I	Ski jumping Nordic combined	
4	1928	Summer	Marian Cieniewski	Wrestling (did not compete)	
5	1932	Winter	Józef Stogowski	Ice hockey	
6	1932	Summer	Janusz Ślązak	Rowing	
7	1936	Winter	Bronisław Czech	Ski jumping Nordic combined Cross-country skiing Alpine skiing	
8	1936	Summer	Klemens Biniakowski	Athletics	
9	1948	Winter	Stanisław Marusarz	Ski jumping	
10	1948	Summer	Mieczysław Łomowski	Athletics	
11	1952	Winter	Stanisław Marusarz	Ski jumping	
12	1952	Summer	Teodor Kocerka	Rowing	
13	1956	Winter	Tadeusz Kwapień	Cross-country skiing	
14	1956	Summer	Tadeusz Rut	Athletics	
15	1960	Winter	Józef Karpiel	Nordic combined Cross-country skiing	
16	1960	Summer	Teodor Kocerka	Rowing	
17	1964	Winter	Jerzy Wojnar	Luge	
18	1964	Summer	Waldemar Baszanowski	Weightlifting	
19	1968	Winter	Stanisław Szczepaniak	Biathlon	
20	1968	Summer	Waldemar Baszanowski	Weightlifting	
21	1972	Winter	Andrzej Bachleda	Alpine skiing	
22	1972	Summer	Waldemar Baszanowski	Weightlifting	
23	1976	Winter	Wojciech Truchan	Biathlon	
24	1976	Summer	Grzegorz Śledziewski	Canoeing	
25	1980	Winter	Józef Łuszczek	Cross-country skiing	
26	1980	Summer	Czesław Kwieciński	Wrestling	
27	1984	Winter	Józef Łuszczek	Cross-country skiing	
28	1988	Winter	Henryk Gruth	Ice hockey	
29	1988	Summer	Bogdan Daras	Wrestling	
30	1992	Winter	Henryk Gruth	Ice hockey	
31	1992	Summer	Waldemar Legień	Judo	
32	1994	Winter	Tomasz Sikora	Biathlon	
33	1996	Summer	Rafał Szukała	Swimming	
34	1998	Winter	Jan Ziemianin	Biathlon	
35	2000	Summer	Andrzej Wroński	Wrestling	
36	2002	Winter	Mariusz Siudek	Figure skating	
37	2004	Summer	Bartosz Kizierowski	Swimming	
38	2006	Winter	Paulina Ligocka	Snowboarding	
39	2008	Summer	Marek Twardowski	Canoeing	
40	2010	Winter	Konrad Niedźwiedzki	Speed skating	
41	2012	Summer	Agnieszka Radwańska	Tennis	
42	2014	Winter	Dawid Kupczyk	Bobsleigh	
43	2016	Summer	Karol Bielecki	Handball	
44	2018	Winter	Zbigniew Bródka	Speed skating	
45	2020	Summer	Maja Włoszczowska	Cycling	
45	2020	Summer	Paweł Korzeniowski	Swimming	
46	2022	Winter	Aleksandra Król	Snowboarding	
46	2022	Winter	Zbigniew Bródka	Speed skating	
47	2024	Summer	Anita Włodarczyk	Athletics	
47	2024	Summer	Przemysław Zamojski	Basketball	

== See also ==
- Poland at the Olympics
