= Marianne Nachmann =

German luger (1931–2026)

Medal record

Luge

World Championships
Bronze medal – third place	1955 Oslo	Women's singles

Marianne Nachmann née Bauer (10 July 1931 – 5 April 2026) was a West German luger who competed during the 1950s. At the inaugural FIL World Luge Championships in Oslo, Norway in 1955, she won the bronze medal in the women's singles event. She competed at 1963 in Imst, Austria, where she placed 17th.

In April 1957 she married the fellow luger Fritz Nachmann with whom she was married for nearly 69 years. She died at age 94 in April 2026.
