= FIL World Luge Championships 1962 =

The FIL World Luge Championships 1962 took place in Krynica, Poland. This was the city's second time hosting the event, doing so previously in 1958.

== Men's singles ==
Medal	Athlete	Time
Gold	Thomas Köhler (GDR)	
Silver	Jerzy Wojnar (POL)	
Bronze	Jochen Asche (GDR)	

== Women's singles ==
Medal	Athlete	Time
Gold	Ilse Geisler (GDR)	
Silver	Gerda Rieser-Cegnar (AUT)	
Bronze	Danuta Nycz (POL)	

== Men's doubles ==
Medal	Athlete	Time
Gold	Italy (Giovanni Graber, Gianpaolo Ambrosi)	
Silver	West Germany (Fritz Nachmann, Max Leo)	
Bronze	Czechoslovakia (Manfred Novotný, Petr Škrabálek)	

== Medal table ==
Rank	Nation	Gold	Silver	Bronze	Total
1	East Germany (GDR)	2	0	1	3
2	Italy (ITA)	1	0	0	1
3	Poland (POL)	0	1	1	2
4	Austria (AUT)	0	1	0	1
4	West Germany (FRG)	0	1	0	1
6	Czechoslovakia (TCH)	0	0	1	1
Totals (6 entries)		3	3	3	9
