= FIL World Luge Championships 1961 =

The FIL World Luge Championships 1961 took place in Girenbad, Switzerland.

== Men's singles ==
Medal	Athlete	Time
Gold	Jerzy Wojnar (POL)	
Silver	Hans Plenk (FRG)	
Bronze	Reinhold Senn (AUT)	

== Women's singles ==
Medal	Athlete	Time
Gold	Elisabeth Nagele (SUI)	
Silver	Marianne Winkler (FRG)	
Bronze	Helene Thurner (AUT)	

== Men's doubles ==
Medal	Athlete	Time
Gold	Italy (Roman Pichler, Karl Prinoth)	
Silver	Italy (David Moroder, Raimondo Prinoth)	
Bronze	Austria (Helmut Thaler, Reinhold Senn)	

== Medal table ==
Rank	Nation	Gold	Silver	Bronze	Total
1	Italy (ITA)	1	1	0	2
2	Poland (POL)	1	0	0	1
2	Switzerland (SUI)	1	0	0	1
4	West Germany (FRG)	0	2	0	2
5	Austria (AUT)	0	0	3	3
Totals (5 entries)		3	3	3	9
