= Haselrieder =

Haselrieder is a German surname. Notable people with the surname include:

- Doris Haselrieder, Italian luger
- Oswald Haselrieder (born 1971), Italian luger, husband of Doris
