= Josef Lenz =

German luger (1934–2023)

Medal record

Men's Luge

Representing West Germany

European Championships
Gold medal – first place	1962 Weissenbach	Men's singles

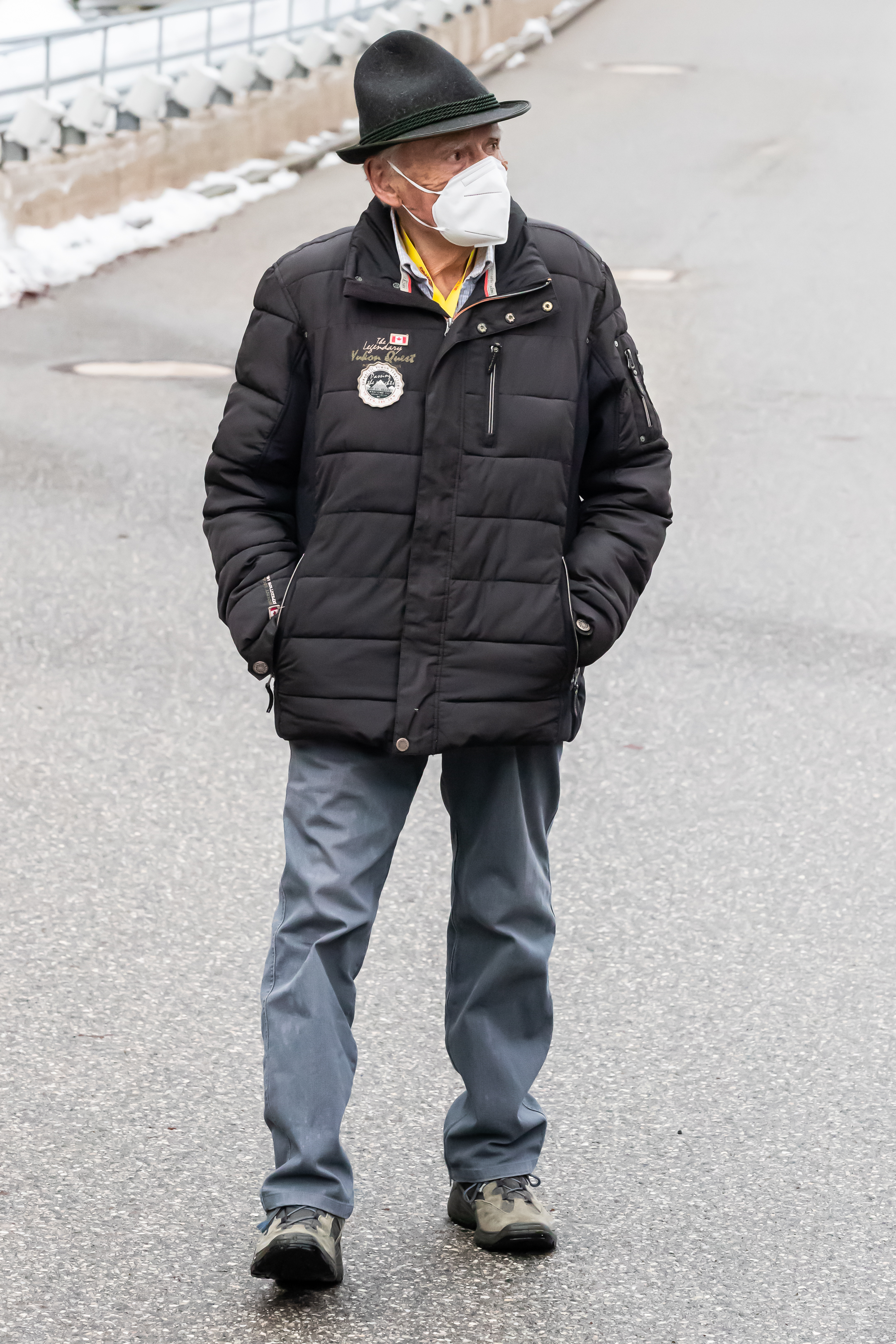
Josef Lenz at the World Champs in Königssee (2021)

Josef "Sepp" Lenz (8 February 1935 – 3 May 2023) was a West German luger who competed in the 1960s. He won the gold medal in the men's singles event at the 1962 FIL European Luge championships in Weissenbach, Austria.

== Biography ==
Lenz was born in Königssee on 8 February 1935. He was selected for the men's singles event at the 1964 Winter Olympics, but was severely injured at the luge track in Igls and did not compete as a result.

Lenz later became a luge coach, being involved in the early career of Austria's Markus Prock. In 1966 he became coach of the German national team, a position he held until 1995. Under his leadership the national team won 31 gold, 31 silver and 34 bronze medals at the Olympics, World Championships and European Championships. Lugers who he guided to success included double World Champion and future International Luge Federation President Josef Fendt, 1984 Winter Olympic doubles champions Hans Stangassinger and Franz Wembacher, and triple Olympic champion Georg Hackl. Along with his father, he also constructed a naturally refrigerated luge track on the banks of the Königssee, the forerunner to the present artificial Königssee track. He subsequently designed other tracks, including the Utah Olympic Park Track, and acted as a consultant for the Alpensia Sliding Centre.

In December 1993, Lenz lost his left leg below the knee when he did not get out of the way of an American luger while clearing off the ice at the bobsleigh, luge, and skeleton track in Winterberg, Germany. Lenz returned to coach the German team at the 1994 Winter Olympics in Lillehammer two months later.

Lenz died on 3 May 2023, at the age of 88.
