= Zdzisław Siuda =

Polish luger

Medal record

Luge

Representing Poland

European Championships
Bronze medal – third place	1962 Weissenbach	Men's singles

Zdzisław Siuda was a Polish luger who competed in the early 1960s. He won a bronze medal in the men's singles event at the 1962 FIL European Luge Championships in Weissenbach, Austria.
