= Pawelczyk =

Pawelczyk is a surname. Notable people with the surname include:

- Alfons Pawelczyk (born 1933), German politician
- Irena Pawełczyk (born 1934), Polish luger
- James A. Pawelczyk (born 1960), American astronaut
