= Manfred Stengl =

Austrian motorcycle racer, luger, and bobsledder

Personal information
- Nationality: Austrian
- Born: 1 April 1946 Salzburg, Austria
- Died: 6 June 1992 (aged 46) Douglas, Isle of Man

Sport
- Country: Austria
- Sport: Luge, Bobsleigh, Motorcycle racing
Motorcycle racing career statistics
Isle of Man TT career
TTs contested	8 (1984, 1986-1992)
TT wins	0
TT podiums	0
Medal record
Luge
Olympic Games
Gold medal – first place	1964 Innsbruck	Men's doubles
European Championships
Silver medal – second place	1962 Weissenbach	Men's doubles
Bobsleigh
World Championships
Bronze medal – third place	1975 Cervinia	Four-man

Manfred Stengl (1 April 1946 – 6 June 1992) was an Austrian luger, bobsleigher and motorcycle road racer.

Stengl was born in Salzburg. He worked as a road-building engineer.

Stengl won the gold medal in the men's doubles event at the 1964 Winter Olympics in Innsbruck. He also won the silver medal in the men's doubles event at the 1962 FIL European Luge Championships in Weissenbach, Austria.

In the 1970s, Stengl turned his attention to bobsleigh, winning a bronze in the four-man event at the 1975 FIBT World Championships in Cervinia, Italy.

Stengl was also active in motorcycle racing, participating in many events from the late 1960s and until his death.

Stengl died in a motorcycle accident during the 1992 Isle of Man TT while competing in the Senior TT category.
