= Hubert Burger =

Italian luger

Medal record

Natural track luge

World Championships
Silver medal – second place	1998 Rautavaara	Men's doubles
Bronze medal – third place	1994 Gsies	Men's doubles

European Championships
Silver medal – second place	1991 Völs am Schlern	Men's doubles

Hubert Burger is an Italian luger who competed during the 1990s. A natural track luger, he won two medals in the men's doubles event at the FIL World Luge Natural Track Championships with a silver in 1998 and a bronze in 1994.

Burger also won a silver medal in the men's doubles event at the 1991 FIL European Luge Natural Track Championships in Völs am Schlern, Italy.
