= Niewiadomski =

Niewiadomski (feminine: Niewiadomska) is a surname. Notable people with the surname include:

- Eligiusz Niewiadomski (1869–1923), Polish painter and art critic
- Julia Niewiadomska (born 2002), Polish handballer
- Krzysztof Niewiadomski (born 1970), Polish luger
- Mariusz Niewiadomski (born 1959), Polish footballer
- Zbigniew Niewiadomski (born 1946), Polish sprint canoer
