= FIL European Luge Natural Track Championships 1991 =

The FIL European Luge Natural Track Championships 1991 took place in Völs am Schlern, Italy.

== Men's singles ==
Medal	Athlete	Time
Gold	Franz Obrist (ITA)	
Silver	Erhard Mahlknecht (ITA)	
Bronze	Harald Steinhauser (ITA)	

== Women's singles ==
Medal	Athlete	Time
Gold	Doris Haselrieder (ITA)	
Silver	Irene Koch (AUT)	
Bronze	Delia Vaudan (ITA)	

== Men's doubles ==
Medal	Athlete	Time
Gold	Poland (Krzysztof Niewiadomski, Oktawian Samulski)	
Silver	Italy (Roland Niedermair, Hubert Burger)	
Bronze	Austria (Georg Eberhardter, Walter Mauracher)	

Niewiadomski and Samulski become the first non-Austrian or Italian competitors to medal at the natural track European championships.

== Medal table ==
Rank	Nation	Gold	Silver	Bronze	Total
1	Italy (ITA)	2	2	2	6
2	Poland (POL)	1	0	0	1
3	Austria (AUT)	0	1	1	2
Totals (3 entries)		3	3	3	9
