= Roland Niedermair =

Italian luger

Medal record

Natural track luge

World Championships
Bronze medal – third place	1994 Gsies	Men's doubles

European Championships
Silver medal – second place	1991 Völs am Schlern	Men's doubles

Roland Niedermair is an Italian luger who competed during the 1990s. A natural track luger, he won the bronze medal in the men's doubles event at the 1994 FIL World Luge Natural Track Championships in Gsies, Italy.

Niedermair also won a silver medal in the men's doubles event at the 1991 FIL European Luge Natural Track Championships in Völs am Schlern, Italy.
