= FIL European Luge Championships 1962 =

The FIL European Luge Championships 1962 took place in Weißenbach, Austria. It marked the first time event was held under the auspices of the International Luge Federation (FIL) which was formed in 1957. Also, it was the first time the championships had been held after being cancelled from 1957 to 1961.

== Men's singles ==
Medal	Athlete	Time
Gold	Josef Lenz (FRG)	
Silver	Anton Venier (AUT)	
Bronze	Zdzyslaw Siuda (POL)	

== Women's singles ==
Medal	Athlete	Time
Gold	Irene Pawelczyk (POL)	
Silver	Helene Thurner (AUT)	
Bronze	Gerda Cegner-Rieser (AUT)	

== Men's doubles ==
Medal	Athlete	Time
Gold	Austria (Anton Venier, Ewald Walch)	
Silver	Austria (Josef Feistmantl, Manfred Stengl)	
Bronze	Austria (Reinhold Frosch, Ludwig Gassner)	

== Medal table ==
Rank	Nation	Gold	Silver	Bronze	Total
1	Austria (AUT)	1	3	2	6
2	Poland (POL)	1	0	1	2
3	West Germany (FRG)	1	0	0	1
Totals (3 entries)		3	3	3	9
