= Raimondo Prinoth =

Italian luger (1944–2006)

Medal record

Luge

World Championships
| Silver medal – second place | 1961 Girenbad | Men's doubles |

Raimondo Prinoth (21 October 1944 – 21 July 2006) was an Italian luger who competed during the 1960s. He won the silver medal in the men's doubles event at the 1961 FIL World Luge Championships in Girenbad, Switzerland. He also competed at the 1968 Winter Olympics.
