= Anton Venier =

Austrian luger

Medal record

Luge

World Championships
Bronze medal – third place	1963 Imst	Men's doubles

European Championships
Gold medal – first place	1962 Weissenbach	Men's doubles
Silver medal – second place	1962 Weissenbach	Men's singles

Anton Venier was an Austrian luger who competed in the early 1960s. He won a bronze medal in the men's doubles event at the 1963 FIL World Luge Championships in Imst, Austria.

Venier also won two medals at the 1962 FIL European Luge Championships in Weissenbach, Austria with a gold in the men's doubles and a silver in the men's singles event.
