= Reinhold Senn =

Austrian luger (1936–2023)

Medal record

Luge

Olympic Games
Silver medal – second place	1964 Innsbruck	Men's doubles

World Championships
Bronze medal – third place	1961 Girenbad	Men's singles
Bronze medal – third place	1961 Girenbad	Men's doubles

European Championships
Silver medal – second place	1967 Königssee	Men's doubles

Reinhold Senn (6 December 1936 in Imst – 1 June 2023) was an Austrian luger who competed during the 1960s.

Senn won the silver medal in the men's doubles event at the 1964 Winter Olympics in Innsbruck.

At the 1961 FIL World Luge Championships in Girenbad, Switzerland, Senn won bronze medals in the men's singles and men's doubles event. He won a silver medal in the men's doubles event at the 1967 FIL European Luge Championships in Königssee, West Germany.

Senn died on 1 June 2023, at the age of 86.
