= Enrico Prinoth =

Italian luger

Medal record

Luge

World Championships
Gold medal – first place	1961 Girenbad	Men's doubles

Enrico Prinoth was an Italian luger who competed during the 1960s. He won the gold medal in the men's doubles event at the 1961 FIL World Luge Championships in Girenbad, Switzerland.
