= Reinhold Frosch =

Austrian luger (1935–2012)

Medal record

Luge

World Championships
Gold medal – first place	1960 Garmisch-Partenkirchen	Men's doubles
Silver medal – second place	1960 Garmisch-Partenkirchen	Men's singles
Bronze medal – third place	1958 Krynica	Men's singles

European Championships
Bronze medal – third place	1962 Weissenbach	Men's doubles

Reinhold Frosch (9 April 1935 – 14 February 2012) was an Austrian luger who competed from the mid-1950s to the early 1960s. He won a complete set of medals at the FIL World Luge Championships with a gold in the men's doubles (1960), a silver in the men's singles event (1960), and a bronze in the men's singles event (1958).

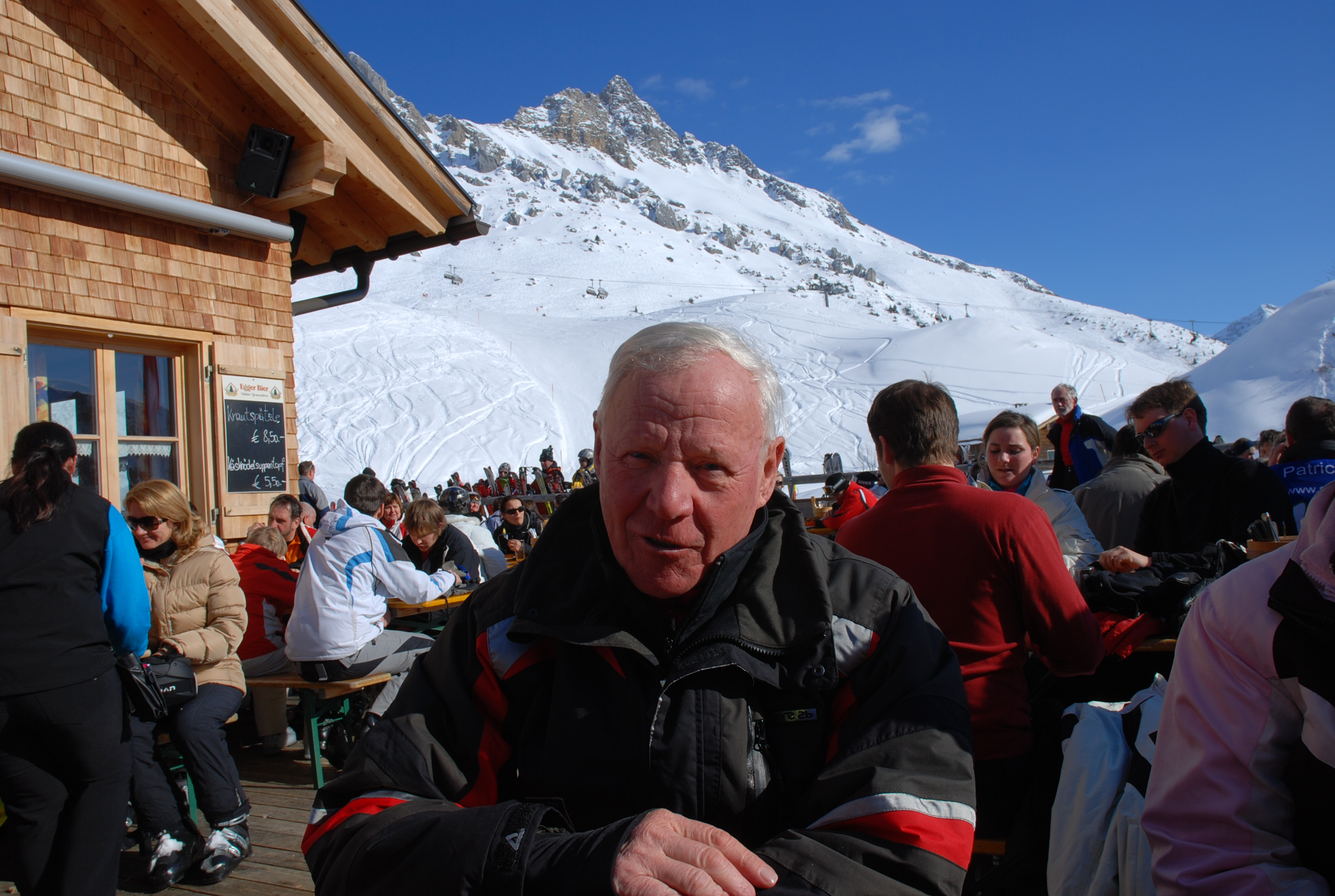
Frosch in 2011

Frosch also won a bronze medal in the men's doubles event at the 1962 FIL European Luge Championships in Weissenbach, Austria.
