= Gerda Rieser-Cegnar =

Austrian luger

Medal record

Luge

World Championships
Silver medal – second place	1962 Krynica	Women's singles

European Championships
Bronze medal – third place	1962 Weissenbach	Women's singles

Gerda Rieser-Cegnar (sometimes listed as Gerda Cegner-Reiser) is an Austrian luger who competed in the early 1960s. She won the silver medal in the women's singles event at the 1962 FIL World Luge Championships in Krynica, Poland.

Rieser-Cegnar also won a bronze medal in the women's singles event at the 1962 FIL European Luge Championships in Weissenbach, Austria.
