= Budny =

Budny is a Polish and Belarusian surname. Notable people with the surname include:

- Benyash Budny, 16th-century writer and translator in Belarus
- Edward Budny (born 1937), Polish cross-country skier
- Symon Budny (c. 1533–1593), Polish-Belarusian humanist and educator
- Weronika Budny (born 1941), Polish cross-country skier
