= Marianne Winkler =

German luger

Medal record

Luge

World Championships
Silver medal – second place	1961 Girenbad	Women's singles

Marianne Winkler was a West German luger who competed in the early 1960s. She won the silver medal in the women's singles at the 1961 FIL World Luge Championships in Girenbad, Switzerland.
