= Manfred Novotný =

Czech luger

Medal record

Luge

World Championships
Bronze medal – third place	1962 Krynica	Men's doubles

Manfred Novotný was a Czechoslovak luger who competed during the early 1960s. He won the bronze medal in the men's doubles event at the 1962 FIL World Luge Championships in Krynica, Poland.
