= FIL World Luge Championships 1960 =

The FIL World Luge Championships 1960 took place in Garmisch-Partenkirchen, West Germany. This was an extraordinary event because, the sport dèbut at the Winter Olympics was delayed 4 years, as track was not constructed for the 1960 Winter Olympics in Squaw Valley.

== Men's singles ==
Medal	Athlete	Time
Gold	Helmut Berndt (GER)	
Silver	Reinhold Frosch (AUT)	
Bronze	Hans Plenk (GER)	

== Women's singles ==
Medal	Athlete	Time
Gold	Maria Isser (AUT)	
Silver	Hannelore Possmoser (AUT)	
Bronze	Erika Leitner (ITA)	

== Doubles ==
Medal	Athlete	Time
Gold	Austria (Reinhold Frosch, Ewald Walch)	
Silver	Austria (Herbert Thaler, Helmut Thaler)	
Bronze	West Germany (Horst Tiedge, Hans Plenk)	

== Medal table ==
Rank	Nation	Gold	Silver	Bronze	Total
1	Austria (AUT)	2	3	0	5
2	West Germany (FRG)	1	0	2	3
3	Italy (ITA)	0	0	1	1
Totals (3 entries)		3	3	3	9
