= Oktawian Samulski =

Polish luger

Medal record

Natural track luge

European Championships
Gold medal – first place	1991 Völs am Schlern	Men's doubles

Oktawian Samulski is a former Polish luger who competed in the late 1980s. A natural track luger, he won the gold medal in the men's doubles event at the 1991 FIL European Luge Natural Track Championships in Völs am Schlern, Italy.
