= Horst Tiedge =

German luger (born 1935)

Medal record

Luge

World Championships
| Bronze medal – third place | 1960 Garmisch-Partenkirchen | Men's doubles |

Horst Tiedge (born 1935) was a West German luger who competed in the late 1950s and early 1960s. He won the bronze medal in the men's doubles event at the 1960 FIL World Luge Championships in Garmisch-Partenkirchen, West Germany. He was born in Ilmenau.
