= Hannelore Possmoser =

Austrian luger

Medal record

Luge

World Championships
Silver medal – second place	1960 Garmisch-Partenkirchen	Women's singles

Hannelore Possmoser (sometimes shown as Hanna Possmoser) was an Austrian luger who competed during the late 1950s and early 1960s. She won the silver medal in the women's singles at the 1960 FIL World Luge Championships in Garmisch-Partenkirchen, West Germany.
