= Elisabeth Nagele =

Swiss luger

Medal record

Luge

World Championships
| Gold medal – first place | 1961 Girenbad | Women's singles |

Elisabeth Nagele (12 June 1933 – 22 June 1993) was a Swiss luger who competed in the early 1960s. She won the gold medal in the women's singles at the 1961 FIL World Luge Championships in Girenbad, Switzerland. Nagele also finished 12th in the women's singles event at the 1964 Winter Olympics in Innsbruck. She later served as a delegate to the International Luge Federation (FIL) in the late 1980s.
