= Klaus Bonsack =

East German luger (1941–2023)

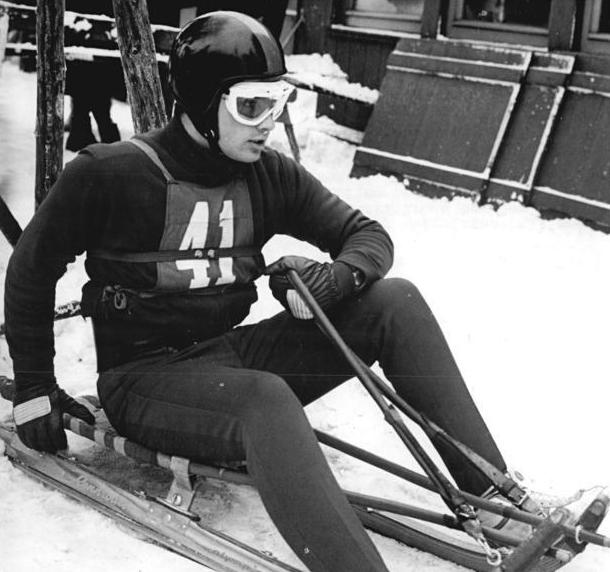
- Bonsack in 1969

Personal information
- Born: 26 December 1941 Waltershausen, Gau Thuringia, Germany
- Died: 5 March 2023 (aged 81) Innsbrück, Austria
Medal record
Men's luge
Representing Germany
Olympic Games
Silver medal – second place	1964 Innsbruck	Men's singles
Representing East Germany
Olympic Games
Gold medal – first place	1968 Grenoble	Men's doubles
Bronze medal – third place	1968 Grenoble	Men's singles
Bronze medal – third place	1972 Sapporo	Men's doubles
World Championships
Gold medal – first place	1967 Hammarstrand	Men's doubles
Silver medal – second place	1965 Davos	Men's doubles
Silver medal – second place	1967 Hammarstrand	Men's singles
Bronze medal – third place	1963 Imst	Men's singles
Bronze medal – third place	1969 Königssee	Men's doubles

Klaus Bonsack (26 December 1941 – 5 March 2023), also known as Klaus-Michael Bonsack, was an East German luger who competed during the 1960s and early 1970s.

Bonsack was born in Waltershausen, Thuringia on 26 December 1941. He won four Winter Olympic medals in men's luge, including one gold (doubles: 1968), one silver (singles: 1964), and two bronzes (singles: 1968, doubles: 1972).

Bonsack also won five medals at the FIL World Luge Championships, including one gold (doubles: 1967), two silvers (doubles: 1965, singles: 1967), and two bronzes (singles: 1963, doubles: 1969).

Bonsack later served as chairman of the track construction commission, approving the final homologation of Cesana Pariol prior to the 2006 Winter Olympics for luge to compete at the track. He was among the first three inductees in the International Luge Federation (FIL) Hall of Fame in 2004, along with compatriot Margit Schumann and Italian luger Paul Hildgartner.

Bonsack later emigrated to Austria where he became a luge coach. One of his students, Doris Neuner, won gold in the women's singles event at the 1992 Winter Olympics in Albertville.

Bonsack died in Innsbruck on 5 March 2023, at the age of 81.

== Sources ==
- FIL approves track for use for the 2006 Winter Olympics, featuring Bonsack
- FIL-Luge.org January 7, 2004 Hall of Fame induction.
- Fuzilogik Sports – Winter Olympic results – Men's luge
- Hickok sports information on World champions in luge and skeleton.
- List of Great Olympians BO
