= Petr Škrabálek =

Czech luger

Medal record

Luge

World Championships
Bronze medal – third place	1962 Krynica-Zdrój	Men's doubles

Petr Škrabálek was a Czech luger who competed for Czechoslovakia during the early 1960s. He won the bronze medal in the men's doubles event at the 1962 FIL World Luge Championships in Krynica-Zdrój, Poland.
