= Jochen Asche =

East German luger

Medal record

Luge
Bronze medal – third place	Schierke 1958	Men's singles
Gold medal – first place	Oybin 1959	Men's singles

World Championships
Bronze medal – third place	1962 Krynica	Men's singles

Jochen Asche was an East German luger who competed during the 1960s. He won the bronze medal in the men's singles event at the 1962 FIL World Luge Championships in Krynica, Poland. He was an athlete of the Wintersportverein und Bobclub Friedrichroda.
