= Max Leo =

German luger (1941–2012)

Medal record

Luge

World Championships
Silver medal – second place	1962 Krynica	Men's doubles

Max Leo (1941 — July 20, 2012) was a West German luger who competed during the early 1960s. He won the silver medal in the men's doubles event at the 1962 FIL World Luge Championships in Krynica, Poland. He had been married to alpine skier Burgl Färbinger.
