= Halina Lacheta =

Polish luger

Medal record

Luge

World Championships
Bronze medal – third place	1958 Krynica	Men's doubles

Halina Lacheta is a Polish luger who competed in the late 1950s. She won the bronze medal in the men's doubles event at the 1958 FIL World Luge Championships in Krynica, Poland.
