= Henryk Gruth =

Polish ice hockey player

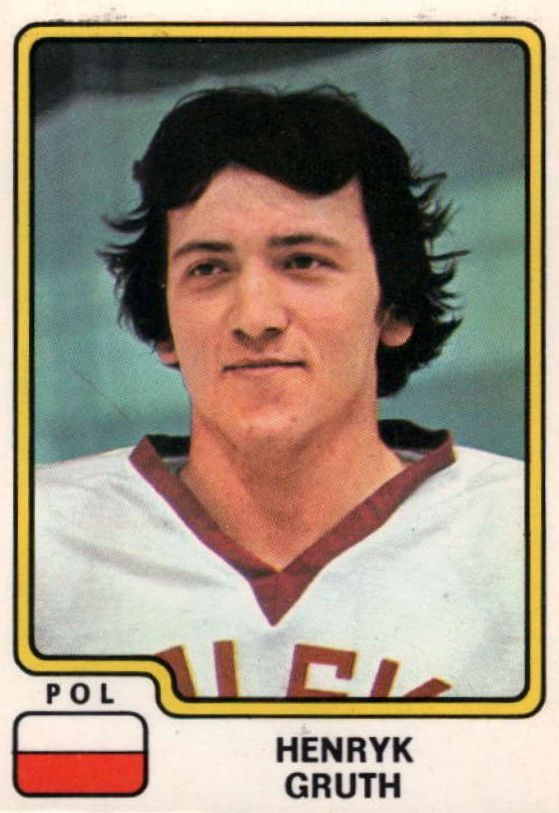
- Born: 2 September 1957 (age 68) Ruda Śląska, Poland
- Height: 6 ft 0 in (183 cm)
- Weight: 198 lb (90 kg; 14 st 2 lb)
- Position: Defence
- Shot: Left
- Played for: GKS Tychy; Zürcher SC
- National team: Poland
- Playing career: 1978–1993

Henryk Jerzy Gruth (born 2 September 1957) is a former Polish professional ice hockey defenceman. One of the best Polish players, Gruth played for GKS Katowice and GKS Tychy in Poland. He spent one season in Switzerland with the Zürcher SC, where he scored seven goals and nineteen assists. He was inducted to the IIHF Hall of Fame in 2006.

== International career ==
Gruth was captain of the Poland men's national ice hockey team from 1982 to 1994, and played for Poland at the Winter Olympics in 1980, 1984, 1988 and 1992, and 17 Ice Hockey World Championships. He holds the record for the most selection to the Polish squad, with 248, as well as the record for the most points (109).

He was inducted to the IIHF Hall of Fame in 2006.

== Coaching career ==
Following his playing days, Gruth turned to coaching. In 1996-97, he was head coach of EHC Salzgitter of the 2. Bundesliga in Germany. He had a record of 5–17–2. He was head coach of the ZSC Lions when current head coach Christian Weber was downgraded to the role of assistant of Beat Lautenschlager with the GCK Lions of the NLB.

Olympic Games
Preceded by Józef Łuszczek	Flagbearer for Poland; Calgary 1988, Albertville 1992	Succeeded by Tomasz Sikora
