= Giovanni Graber =

Italian luger (1939–2024)

Medal record

Luge

World Championships
Gold medal – first place	1962 Krynica	Men's doubles

Giovanni Graber (26 March 1939 – 20 December 2024) was an Italian luger who competed during the 1950s and the 1960s. He won a medal in the men's doubles event at the FIL World Luge Championships with a gold in 1962.

Graber competed in two Winter Olympics in the men's doubles event, finishing tied for fifth in 1964 and eighth in 1968. He died on 20 December 2024, at the age of 85.

== Sources ==
- Wallenchinsky, David. (1984). "Luge: Men's Two-seater". In The Complete Book the Olympics: 1896-1980. New York: Penguin Books. p. 576.
