= Giampaolo Ambrosi =

Italian luger (born 1940)

Medal record

Men's luge

Representing Italy

World Championships
Gold medal – first place	1962 Krynica	Men's doubles

Giampaolo Ambrosi (born 28 July 1940 in Pergine Valsugana) is an Italian former luger who competed during the early 1960s. He won the gold medal in the men's doubles event at the 1962 FIL World Luge Championships in Krynica, Poland.

Ambrosi also finished tied for fifth in the men's doubles event at the 1964 Winter Olympics in Innsbruck.
