= Helmut Thaler =

Austrian luger (born 1940)

Medal record

Luge

Representing Austria

Olympic Games
Silver medal – second place	1964 Innsbruck	Men's doubles

World Championships
Silver medal – second place	1960 Garmisch-Partenkirchen	Men's doubles
Bronze medal – third place	1961 Girenbad	Men's doubles

European Championships
Silver medal – second place	1967 Königssee	Men's doubles

Helmut Thaler (born 22 January 1940) was an Austrian luger who competed from the late 1950s to the late 1960s. He won the silver medal in the men's doubles event at the 1964 Winter Olympics in Innsbruck and competed at the 1968 Winter Olympics.

Thaler also won two medals in the men's doubles event at the FIL World Luge Championships with a silver in 1960 and a bronze in 1961. He won a silver medal in the men's doubles event at the 1967 FIL European Luge Championships in Königssee, West Germany.
