= Antonia Lanthaler =

Austrian luger

Personal information
- Nationality: Austrian
- Born: 3 April 1946 (age 78); Kreith Stubai, Austria

Sport
- Sport: Luge

Antonia Lanthaler (born 3 April 1946) is an Austrian luger. She competed in the women's singles event at the 1964 Winter Olympics.
