= FIL World Luge Natural Track Championships 1994 =

The FIL World Luge Natural Track Championships 1994 took place in Gsies, Italy. This was the second time the city had hosted the event having done so in 1990.

== Men's singles ==
Medal	Athlete	Time
Gold	Gerhard Pilz (AUT)	
Silver	Franz Obrist (ITA)	
Bronze	Erhard Mahlknecht (ITA)	

== Women's singles ==
Medal	Athlete	Time
Gold	Beatrix Mahlknecht (ITA)	
Silver	Irene Zechner (AUT)	
Bronze	Doris Haselrieder (ITA)	

== Men's doubles ==
Medal	Athlete	Time
Gold	Italy (Manfred Graber, Gunther Steinhauser)	
Silver	Italy (Jurgen Pezzi, Christian Hafner)	
Bronze	Italy (Roland Niedermair, Hubert Burger)	

== Medal table ==
Rank	Nation	Gold	Silver	Bronze	Total
1	Italy (ITA)	2	2	3	7
2	Austria (AUT)	1	1	0	2
Totals (2 entries)		3	3	3	9
