= Erika Leitner =

Italian luger

Medal record

Luge

World Championships
Bronze medal – third place	1960 Garmisch-Partenkirchen	Women's singles

European Championships
Bronze medal – third place	1955 Hahnenklee	Women's singles

Erika Leitner was an Italian luger who competed in the late 1950s and early 1960s. She won the bronze medal in the women's singles at the 1960 FIL World Luge Championships in Garmisch-Partenkirchen, West Germany.

Leitner also won a bronze medal in the women's singles event at the 1955 European luge championships in Hahnenklee, West Germany.
