= Ernst Berndt =

Olympic athlete and luger (1915–1990)

Medal record

Men's luge

Representing West Germany

World Championships
Gold medal – first place	1960 Garmisch-Partenkirchen	Men's singles

Ernst Helmut Berndt (17 June 1915 – 30 April 1990) was a Sudeten German-Czechoslovak athlete who competed in both track and field and luge. As a hurdler he represented Czechoslovakia at the 1936 Summer Olympics. Berndt was born in Liberec in June 1915. He moved to Lower Saxony after World War II and took up luge. Competing for West Germany, he became the German national champion in 1958 before winning the gold medal in the men's singles event at the 1960 FIL World Luge Championships in Garmisch-Partenkirchen. He died in Seesen in April 1990 at the age of 74.
