= Kazimierz Zelek =

Polish cross-country skier

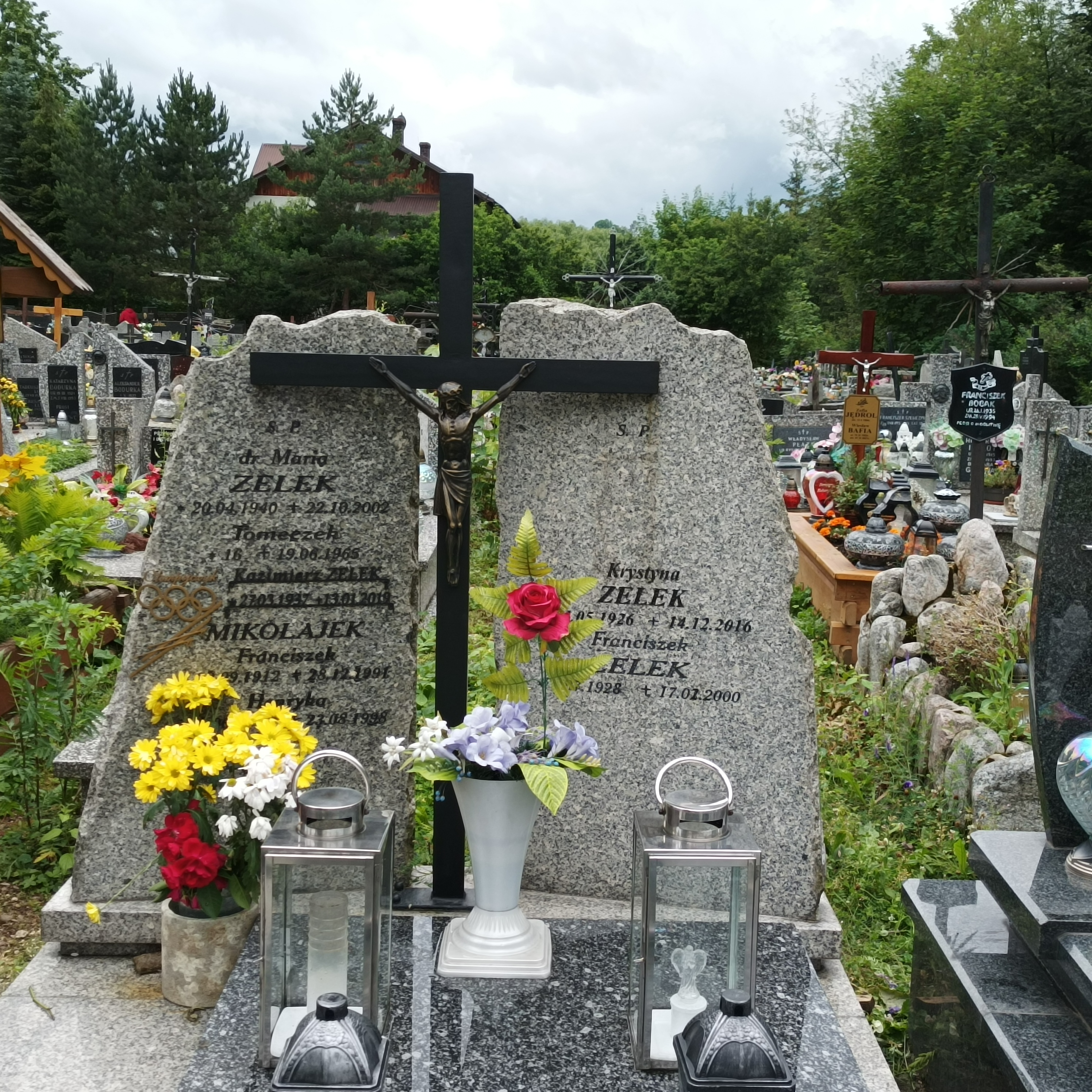
- Kazimierz Zelek's gravestone

Personal information
- Nationality: Polish
- Born: 27 March 1937; Zakopane, Poland
- Died: 13 January 2019 (aged 81)

Sport
- Sport: Cross-country skiing

Kazimierz Zelek (27 March 1937 – 13 January 2019) was a Polish cross-country skier. He competed in the men's 15 kilometre event at the 1960 Winter Olympics.
