= Ulrich Mahlknecht =

German-Italian physician scientist (born 1967)

Ulrich Rudolph Mahlknecht (born April 29, 1967) is an internationally renowned German/Italian physician scientist.

== Scientific achievements ==
Mahlknecht grew up in La Villa in South Tyrol, Italy. He studied medicine at the University of Bochum, the University of Birmingham, the Paris-Sud 11 University and the University of Tübingen, where he received his medical doctorate in 1995. He received his postgraduate medical training in internal medicine at the University of Freiburg in Freiburg im Breisgau. From 1996 until 1999 Ulrich Mahlknecht was a graduate student at the Picower Graduate School Of Molecular Medicine (State University of New York), where he was then employed as a postdoc and later as the Senior Scientist. He has actively published in cancer and HIV research, authoring several classic papers. From 1999 until 2003 he received specialist training in internal medicine and hematology/oncology at the Goethe University Frankfurt in Frankfurt am Main, where he became an assistant professor of internal medicine. From 2004 until 2007 he was an associate professor at the University Hospital Heidelberg where he was the head of the acute leukemias and myelodysplastic syndromes task force. Ulrich Mahlknecht was the founder of the Heidelberg excellence center for myelodysplastic syndromes. Since 2012 Ulrich Mahlknecht is head of the department of hematology/oncology at the St. Lukas Klinik in Solingen, Germany.

Ulrich Mahlknecht was a scholar within a Deutsche Forschungsgemeinschaft young investigator excellence research program (Emmy Noether-Program). His research was later also supported by the Deutsche José Carreras Leukemia Foundation. In 2007 Ulrich Mahlknecht became a full professor of medicine at the Saarland University, where he is currently head of the Division of Immunotherapy and Gene Therapy within the Department of Internal Medicine. Ulrich Mahlknecht is president of the Clinical Epigenetics Society (CLEPSO), a non-for-profit international organization, which supports basic, translational and clinical research within the field of epigenetics. In 2009 Ulrich Mahlknecht founded and became editor-in-chief of the Clinical Epigenetics journal. He serves also as an editor-in-chief for the Journal of Clinical Trials and the Journal of Blood disorders & Transfusion, and he is deputy editor-in-chief of Genetics and Epigenetics. In addition, he is on the editorial board of numerous other journals within the fields of genetics, epigenetics, hematology and oncology. In May 2019 Ulrich Mahlknecht was presented with the Albert Nelson Marquis Lifetime Achievement Award by Marquis Who's Who in recognition of his outstanding contributions to his profession and as a leader in the fields of healthcare and higher education.
