= Fritz Nachmann =

German luger (born 1929)

Medal record

Men's Luge

Representing West Germany

Olympic Games
Bronze medal – third place	1968 Grenoble	Men's doubles

World Championships
Gold medal – first place	1957 Davos	Men's doubles
Gold medal – first place	1958 Krynica	Men's doubles
Gold medal – first place	1963 Imst	Men's singles
Silver medal – second place	1962 Krynica	Men's doubles
Bronze medal – third place	1955 Oslo	Men's doubles

European Championships
Silver medal – second place	1967 Königssee	Men's singles

Fritz Nachmann (born 16 August 1929) is a West German former luger who competed during the 1950s and the 1960s. He was born in Kreuth. He won the bronze medal in the men's doubles event at the 1968 Winter Olympics in Grenoble. Nachmann also won five medals at the FIL World Luge Championships with four medals in men's doubles (gold: FIL World Luge Championships 1957, FIL World Luge Championships 1958; silver: FIL World Luge Championships 1962, bronze: FIL World Luge Championships 1955) and one medal in men's singles (gold: FIL World Luge Championships 1963). He also won a silver medal in the men's singles event at the 1967 FIL European Luge Championships in Königssee, West Germany.
