= Marek Fundakowski =

Polish footballer (born 1988)

Personal information
- Full name: Marek Andrzej Fundakowski
- Date of birth: 18 April 1988 (age 38)
- Place of birth: Jasło, Poland
- Height: 1.82 m (6 ft 0 in)
- Position: Striker

Team information
- Current team: Karpaty Krosno
- Number: 9

Senior career*
| Years | Team | Apps | (Gls) |
| 2003–2004 | Krośnianka Krosno | | |
| 2004–2006 | Stal Mielec | | |
| 2006–2007 | Young Fellows Juventus | 15 | (1) |
| 2007–2008 | Korona Kielce | 3 | (0) |
| 2007–2008 | Korona Kielce (MESA) | 19 | (9) |
| 2008 | Korona Kielce II | 13 | (6) |
| 2009 | Hetman Zamość | 36 | (15) |
| 2010–2011 | Motor Lublin | 44 | (4) |
| 2011–2013 | ASIL Lysi | 47 | (20) |
| 2013–2016 | Karpaty Krosno | 58 | (9) |
| 2016–2017 | Izolator Boguchwała | | |
| 2018– | Karpaty Krosno | 240 | (35) |
| 2024 | → Glinik Gorlice (loan) | 16 | (6) |
- * Club domestic league appearances and goals as of 22:50, 17 July 2026 (UTC)

Marek Andrzej Fundakowski (born 18 April 1988) is a Polish footballer who plays as a striker for Karpaty Krosno. He also played in Krośnianka Krosno, Stal Mielec and SC Young Fellows Juventus.

== Honours ==
Karpaty Krosno

- Polish Cup (Subcarpathia regionals): 2019–20
- Polish Cup (Krosno regionals): 2017–18, 2019–20, 2020–21, 2021–22
