= Tadeusz Jankowski =

Polish cross-country skier (1930–2022)

Personal information
- Nationality: Polish
- Born: 20 April 1930 Jabłonki, Poland
- Died: 24 May 2022 (aged 92) Zakopane, Poland

Sport
- Sport: Cross-country skiing

Tadeusz Jankowski (20 April 1930 – 24 May 2022) was a Polish cross-country skier. He competed in the men's 15 kilometre event at the 1964 Winter Olympics.

He died in Zakopane on 24 May 2022, at the age of 92.
