= Helena Boettcher =

Polish luger

Medal record

Luge

World Championships
Silver medal – second place	1958 Krynica	Women's singles

Helena Boettcher was a Polish luger who competed during the 1950s. She won the silver medal in the women's singles event at the 1958 FIL World Luge Championships in Krynica, Poland.
