= Sławomir Orzeł =

Polish strongman competitor and bodybuilder

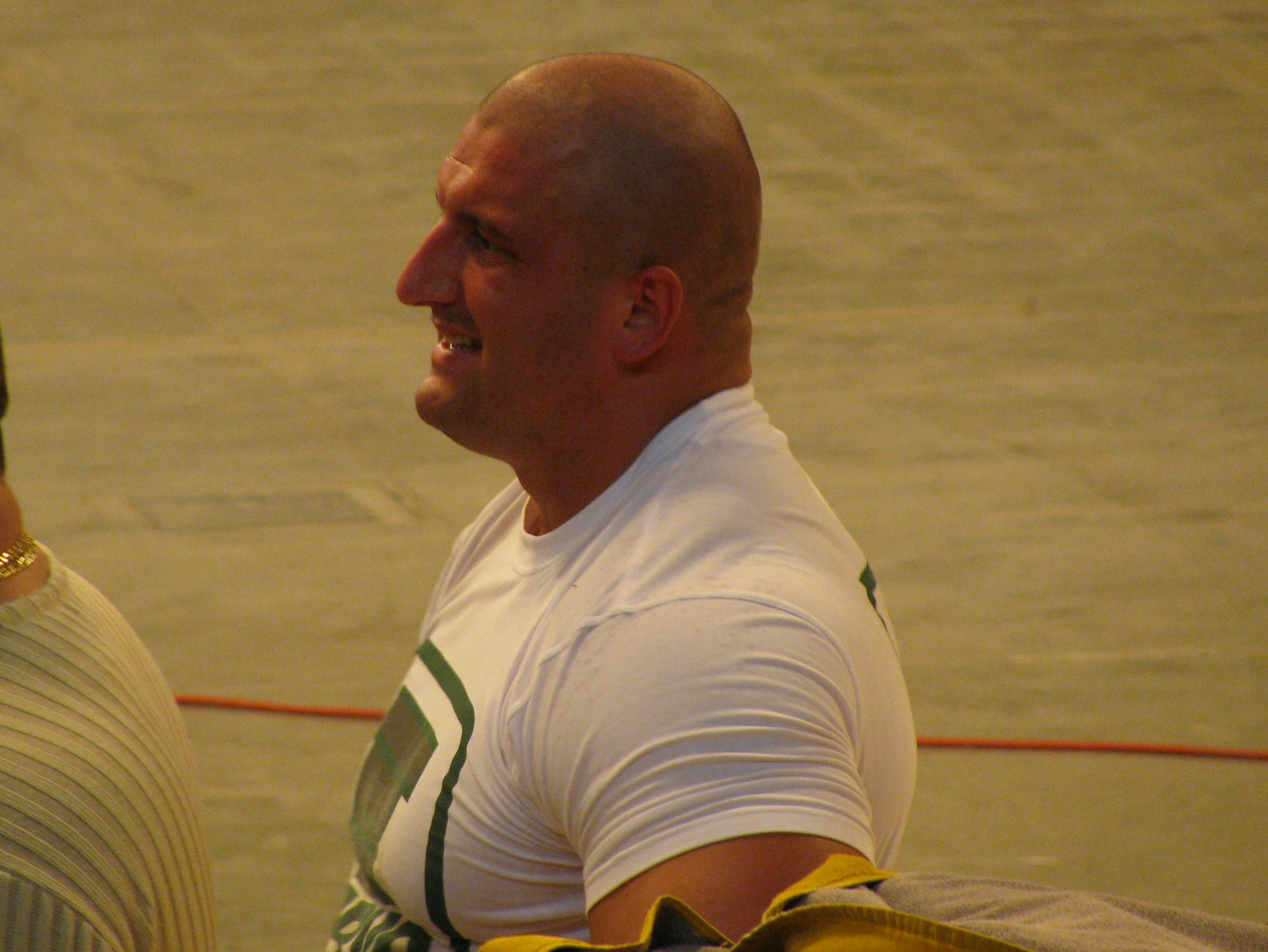
Orzel at the Pojedynek Gigantów, Łódź 2009.

Sławomir Orzeł (born 1979 in Puck) is a Polish strongman competitor and bodybuilder who is known by the nickname Max. He lives in Karwieńskie Błota in Gmina Krokowa.

== Strongman achievements ==
- 2004
  - Poland vs IFSA Baltic Team – 2nd
- 2005
  - Poland's Strongest Man – 4th
- 2007
  - Poland's Strongest Man 2007 – 5th
