= Jerzy Wojnar =

Polish luger (1930–2005)

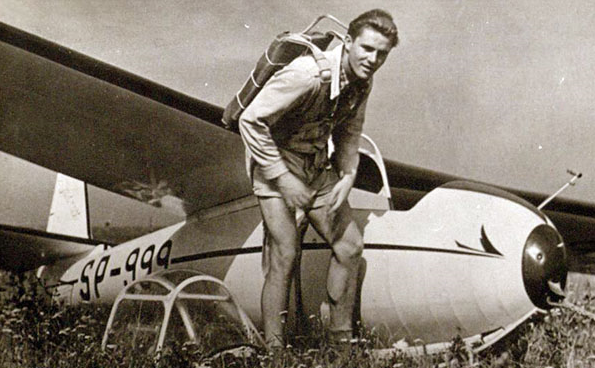
- Born: 7 October 1930; Lwów, Second Polish Republic
- Died: 2 February 2005 (aged 74); Warsaw, Poland

Jerzy Wojnar
Medal record

Luge

World Championships
Gold medal – first place	1958 Krynica	Men's singles
Gold medal – first place	1961 Girenbad	Men's singles
Silver medal – second place	1962 Krynica	Men's singles

Jerzy Wojnar (7 October 1930 in Lwów – 2 February 2005 in Warsaw) was a Polish pilot and luger who competed from the mid-1950s to the late 1960s. He won the three medals in the men's singles event at the FIL World Luge Championships with two golds (1958, 1961) and one silver (1962).

Wojnar competed in two Winter Olympics, earning his best finish of eighth in the men's singles event at Grenoble in 1968.

Olympic Games
Preceded by Józef Karpiel	Flagbearer for Poland; Innsbruck 1964	Succeeded by Stanisław Szczepaniak
