= Andrzej Mateja =

Polish cross-country skier (1935–2019)

Personal information
- Nationality: Polish
- Born: 26 August 1935; Kościelisko, Poland
- Died: 5 March 2019 (aged 83)
- Height: 175 cm (5 ft 9 in)

Sport
- Sport: Cross-country skiing

Andrzej Mateja (26 August 1935 – 5 March 2019) was a Polish cross-country skier. He competed at the 1956 Winter Olympics and the 1960 Winter Olympics. He died on 5 March 2019.
