= Ilse Geisler =

East German luger

Medal record

Women's luge

Representing Germany

Olympic Games
Silver medal – second place	1964 Innsbruck	Women's singles

Representing East Germany

World Championships
Gold medal – first place	1962 Krynica	Women's singles
Gold medal – first place	1963 Imst	Women's singles
Bronze medal – third place	1965 Davos	Women's singles

Ilse Geisler (later Vorsprach and since divorced, born 10 January 1941) is an East German luger who competed from the late 1950s to the mid-1960s. She won the silver medal in the women's singles event at the 1964 Winter Olympics in Innsbruck.

She was born in Kunnersdorf. Geisler also won three medals in the women's singles event at the FIL World Luge Championships with two golds (1962, 1963) and one bronze (1965).
