= Władysław Żmuda =

Władysław Żmuda can refer to:

- Władysław Jan Żmuda (born 1939), Polish footballer
- Władysław Antoni Żmuda (born 1954), Polish footballer
