= Danuta Nycz =

Polish luger

Medal record

Luge

World Championships
Bronze medal – third place	1962 Krynica	Women's singles

Danuta Nycz is a Polish luger who competed in the early 1960s. She won the bronze medal in the women's singles event at the 1962 FIL World Luge Championships in Krynica, Poland.

== Bibliography ==
- Hickok sports information on World champions in luge and skeleton.
- SportQuick.com information on World champions in luge (in French)
