= FIL World Luge Championships 1963 =

The FIL World Luge Championships 1963 took place in Imst, Austria.

== Men's singles ==
Medal	Athlete	Time
Gold	Fritz Nachmann (GER)	
Silver	Hans Plenk (GER)	
Bronze	Klaus Bonsack (GDR)	

== Women's singles ==
Medal	Athlete	Time
Gold	Ilse Geisler (GDR)	
Silver	Helene Thurner (AUT)	
Bronze	Janina Susczewska (POL)	

Geisler becomes the first woman to repeat as World Champion.

== Doubles ==
Medal	Athlete	Time
Gold	Poland (Ryszard Pędrak-Janowicz, Lucjan Kudzia)	
Silver	Poland (Edward Fender, Mieczysław Pawełkiewicz)	
Bronze	Austria (Anton Venier, Ewald Walch)	

== Medal table ==
Rank	Nation	Gold	Silver	Bronze	Total
1	Poland (POL)	1	1	1	3
2	West Germany (FRG)	1	1	0	2
3	East Germany (GDR)	1	0	1	2
4	Austria (AUT)	0	1	1	2
Totals (4 entries)		3	3	3	9
