= Piotr Wala =

Polish ski jumper

Personal information
- Nationality: Polish
- Born: 16 December 1936; Bystra Śląska, Poland
- Died: 22 October 2013 (aged 76); Bielsko-Biała, Poland

Sport
- Sport: Ski jumping

Piotr Wala (16 December 1936 – 22 October 2013) was a Polish ski jumper. He competed in the normal hill and large hill events at the 1964 Winter Olympics.
