= Jerzy Koszla =

Polish luger (1935–1959)

Medal record

Luge

World Championships
Silver medal – second place	1958 Krynica	Men's doubles

Jerzy Koszla (3 October 1935 – 17 September 1959) was a Polish luger who competed during the late 1950s. He won the silver medal in the men's doubles event at the 1958 FIL World Luge Championships in Krynica, Poland.

Koszla died the following year in a motorcycle accident.
