= Maria Semczyszak =

Polish luger

Medal record

Luge

World Championships
Gold medal – first place	1958 Krynica	Women's singles

Maria Semczyszak (born 21 March 1932 in Andrzejówka) was a Polish luger who competed during the 1950s. She won the gold medal in the women's singles event at the 1958 FIL World Luge Championships in Krynica, Poland.
