= FIL World Luge Championships 1958 =

The FIL World Luge Championships 1958 took place in Krynica, Poland.

== Men's singles ==
Medal	Athlete	Time
Gold	Jerzy Wojnar (POL)	
Silver	Ryszard Pędrak-Janowicz (POL)	
Bronze	Reinhold Frosch (AUT)	

== Women's singles ==
Medal	Athlete	Time
Gold	Maria Semczyszak (POL)	
Silver	Helena Boettcher (POL)	
Bronze	Barbara Gorgoń (POL)	

== Men's doubles ==
Medal	Athlete	Time
Gold	West Germany (Josef Strillinger, Fritz Nachmann)	
Silver	Poland (Jerzy Koszla, Janina Susczewska)	
Bronze	Poland (Ryszard Pędrak-Janowicz, Halina Lacheta)	

Strillinger and Nachmann became the first repeat champions at the World Championships.

== Medal table ==
Rank	Nation	Gold	Silver	Bronze	Total
1	Poland (POL)	2	3	2	7
2	West Germany (FRG)	1	0	0	1
3	Austria (AUT)	0	0	1	1
Totals (3 entries)		3	3	3	9
