= Beatrix Mahlknecht =

Italian luger

Medal record

Natural track luge

World Championships
Gold medal – first place	1994 Gsies	Women's singles

Beatrix Mahlknecht was an Italian luger who competed during the mid-1990s. A natural track luger, she won the gold medal in the women's singles event at the 1994 FIL World Luge Natural Track Championships in Gsies, Italy.
