= Doris Haselrieder =

Italian luger

Medal record

Natural track luge

World Championships
Bronze medal – third place	1994 Gsies	Women's singles

European Championships
Gold medal – first place	1991 Fié allo Sciliar	Women's singles
Silver medal – second place	1993 Stein an der Enns	Women's singles

Doris Haselrieder is a retired Italian luger who competed in the early to mid-1990s. A natural track luger, she won the bronze medal in the women's singles event at the 1994 FIL World Luge Natural Track Championships in Gsies, Italy.

Haselrieder also won two medals in the women's singles event at the FIL European Luge Natural Track Championships with a gold in 1991 and a silver in 1993.

Her husband, Oswald, won the bronze medal in the men's doubles event at the 2006 Winter Olympics in Turin. They had a child at the end of July 2007.
