= Józef Łuszczek =

Polish cross-country skier

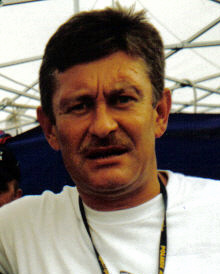

Personal information
- Born: 20 May 1955

Sport
- Country: Poland
- Sport: cross-country skiing

Józef Łuszczek (born 20 May 1955 in Ząb) is a Polish former cross-country skier who competed from 1978 to 1984. He won two medals at the 1978 FIS Nordic World Ski Championships in Lahti with a gold in the 15 km and a bronze in the 30 km.

Łuszczek's best Winter Olympic finish was 5th in the 30 km event at Lake Placid, New York, in 1980.

Olympic Games
Preceded by Wojciech Truchan	Flagbearer for Poland; Lake Placid 1980, Sarajevo 1984	Succeeded by Henryk Gruth
