= Janina Susczewska =

Polish luger

Medal record

Luge

World Championships
Silver medal – second place	1958 Krynica	Men's doubles
Bronze medal – third place	1963 Imst	Women's singles

Janina Susczewska-Siwy (born 14 February 1936 in Brzozówka near Grodno) is a Polish luger who competed in the late 1950s and early 1960s. She won two medals at the FIL World Luge Championships with a silver in the men's doubles event (1958) and a bronze medal in the women's singles event (1963).
