= Krzysztof Niewiadomski =

Polish luger

Medal record

Natural track luge

European Championships
| Gold medal – first place | 1991 Völs am Schlern | Men's doubles |

Krzysztof Niewiadomski was a Polish luger who played competitively in the late 1980s. He won the gold medal in the men's doubles event at the 1991 FIL European Luge Natural Track Championships in Völs am Schlern, Italy.
