= Erhard Mahlknecht =

Italian luger

Medal record

Natural track luge

World Championships
Bronze medal – third place	1994 Gsies	Men's singles

European Championships
Silver medal – second place	1991 Fié allo Sciliar	Men's singles
Bronze medal – third place	1987 Jesenice	Men's singles

Erhard Mahlknecht was an Italian luger who competed in from the late 1980s to the mid-1990s. A natural track luger, he won a bronze in the singles event at the 1996 FIL World Luge Natural Track Championships in Oberperfuss, Austria.

Mahlknecht also won two men's singles medals at the FIL European Luge Natural Track Championships with a silver in 1991 and a bronze in 1987.
