= Wojciech Krauze =

Polish footballer

Personal information
- Date of birth: 3 July 1983 (age 43)
- Place of birth: Poland
- Height: 1.76 m (5 ft 9 in)
- Position: Striker

Team information
- Current team: Tarnovia Tarnów
- Number: 10

Senior career*
| Years | Team | Apps | (Gls) |
| 2000 | Tarnovia Tarnów | | |
| 2001–2002 | Unia Tarnów | | |
| 2003–2005 | GKS Katowice | 17 | (1) |
| 2005–2006 | Szczakowianka Jaworzno | 28 | (5) |
| 2006–2007 | Thyella Patras | 27 | (3) |
| 2007 | Korinthos | | |
| 2008 | LKS Nieciecza | | |
| 2008 | Kmita Zabierzów | 12 | (0) |
| 2009–2012 | Stal Rzeszów | 83 | (8) |
| 2012 | SG Diepholz von 1870 | | |
| 2012–2013 | BSV Schwarz-Weiß Rehden | 1 | (1) |
| 2013–2016 | Türk-Birlikspor Pinneberg | 42 | (8) |
| 2016–2018 | FC Elmshorn | 41 | (12) |
| 2018–2019 | VfL Pinneberg | | |
| 2019–2020 | Watra Białka Tatrzańska | 0 | (0) |
| 2020–2021 | Unia Tarnów | 12 | (1) |
| 2021–2022 | Igloopol Dębica | 8 | (0) |
| 2022–2023 | LKS Rudka | 13 | (4) |
| 2023– | Tarnovia Tarnów | 9 | (0) |
- * Club domestic league appearances and goals as of 3 July 2024

Wojciech Krauze (born 7 July 1983) is a Polish professional footballer who plays as a forward for Tarnovia Tarnów.

In early 2009, he moved to the III liga club Stal Rzeszów, scoring three goals in the spring round. With Krauze in the roster, Stal earned promotion to the third tier. He played in Rzeszów for three seasons before moving to Germany.

== Honours ==
Unia Tarnów

- IV liga Lesser Poland East: 2020–21
