= Lucjan Kudzia =

Polish luger (born 1942)

Medal record

Luge

World Championships
Gold medal – first place	1963 Imst	Men's doubles

Lucjen Jacenty Kudzia (born 14 April 1942 in Zawoja) is a Polish former luger who competed during the early 1960s. He won a gold medal in the men's doubles event at the 1963 FIL World Luge Championships in Imst, Austria.

Kudzia competed in the 1964 Winter Olympics where he finished tied for fifth in the men's doubles event.
