= Józef Gut Misiaga =

Polish cross-country skier

Personal information
- Nationality: Polish
- Born: 25 May 1939 (age 85); Zakopane, Poland

Sport
- Sport: Cross-country skiing

Józef Gut Misiaga (born 25 May 1939) is a Polish cross-country skier. He competed at the 1960 Winter Olympics and the 1964 Winter Olympics.
