= Mieczysław Pawełkiewicz =

Polish luger (1938–2007)

Medal record

Luge

Representing Poland

World Championships
Silver medal – second place	1963 Imst	Men's doubles
Silver medal – second place	1965 Davos	Men's singles

Mieczysław Pawełkiewicz (February 13, 1938, Bielsko-Biała – December 3, 2007, Bielsko-Biała) was a Polish luger who competed during the mid-1960s. He won two silver medals at the FIL World Luge Championships, earning his first in men's doubles in 1963 and his second in men's singles in 1965.

Pawełkiewicz also competed in luge at the 1964 Winter Olympics in Innsbruck, finishing sixth in the men's singles and seventh in the men's doubles event, respectively.
