= Józef Rysula =

Polish cross-country skier (1939–2020)

Personal information
- Nationality: Polish
- Born: 13 March 1939; Kościelisko, Poland
- Died: 23 November 2020 (aged 81)

Sport
- Sport: Cross-country skiing

Józef Rysula (13 March 1939 – 23 November 2020) was a Polish cross-country skier. He competed at the 1960 Winter Olympics in Squaw Valley, the 1964 Winter Olympics in Innsbruck, and the 1968 Winter Olympics in Grenoble.
