= Edward Budny =

Polish cross-country skier

Personal information
- Nationality: Polish
- Born: 24 May 1937 (age 87); Kozy, Poland

Sport
- Sport: Cross-country skiing

Edward Budny (born 24 May 1937) is a Polish cross-country skier. He competed in the men's 15 kilometre event at the 1964 Winter Olympics.
