= Ryszard Pędrak-Janowicz =

Polish luger (1932–2004)

Medal record

Luge

Representing Poland

World Championships
Gold medal – first place	1963 Imst	Men's doubles
Silver medal – second place	1958 Krynica	Men's singles
Bronze medal – third place	1958 Krynica	Men's doubles

Ryszard Pędrak-Janowicz (17 May 1932 in Lwów – 1 February 2004 in Kraków) was a Polish luger who competed from the mid-1950s to the mid-1960s. He won a complete set of medals at the FIL World Luge Championships with a gold in the men's doubles (1963), a silver in the men's singles (1958) and a bronze in the men's doubles event (1958).

Pędrak-Janowicz competed in the 1964 Winter Olympics where he finished tied for fifth in the men's doubles event.
