= Edward Fender =

Polish luger (1942–2021)

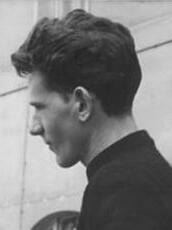
- Fender in 1959

Medal record

Luge

World Championships
Silver medal – second place	1963 Imst	Men's doubles

Edward Fender (8 August 1942 – 6 November 2021) was a Polish luger who competed during the mid-1960s. He won the silver medal in the men's doubles event at the 1963 FIL World Luge Championships in Imst, Austria.

Fender also finished seventh in the men's doubles event at the 1964 Winter Olympics in Innsbruck.

He died on 6 November 2021, at the age of 79.

== Sources ==
- Hickok sports information on World champions in luge and skeleton.
- Wallechinsky, David. (1984). "Luge - Men's singles". The Complete Book of the Olympics: 1896-1980. New York: Penguin Books. pp. 575–6.
