= Elwira Seroczyńska =

Polish speed skater

Personal information
- Born: 1 May 1931 Wilno, Poland
- Died: 24 December 2004 (aged 73) London, England
- Height: 1.60 m (5 ft 3 in)
- Weight: 59 kg (130 lb)

Sport
- Country: Poland
- Sport: Speed skating
Medal record
Women's speed skating
Representing Poland
Olympic Games
Silver medal – second place	1960 Squaw Valley	1,500 m

Elwira Seroczyńska, née Potapowicz (1 May 1931 – 24 December 2004) was a Polish speed skater.

Seroczyńska was born as Elwira Potapowicz in Wilno, Poland (now Vilnius, Lithuania). A graduate of the State Administrative and Economic School in Elbląg (1951), she and became Polish Allround Champion for the first time in 1952. She would eventually become Polish Allround Champion a total of five times, last in 1963. Apart from her allround titles she won 17 distance titles (some also count the out of competition 1953 1000m race as a title) and established 16 official Polish distance records and one combination record. Several combinations skated at Polish championships were never recognised as being a Polish record due to the combination of distances skated. During her skating career she was member of Stal Elbląg (1950–1953), FSO-Stal Warszawa (1954–1957) and Sarmata Warszawa (1957–1964). At the 1960 Winter Olympics, she won a silver medal on the 1,500 m. At the 1962 World Championships in Imatra, she won a Gold Medal on the 500m. After her skating career she studied at the Warsaw Academy of Physical Education (1972), where she received a master's degree and became trainer of the Polish skating team. She died in London, United Kingdom at the age of 73.

== Results ==
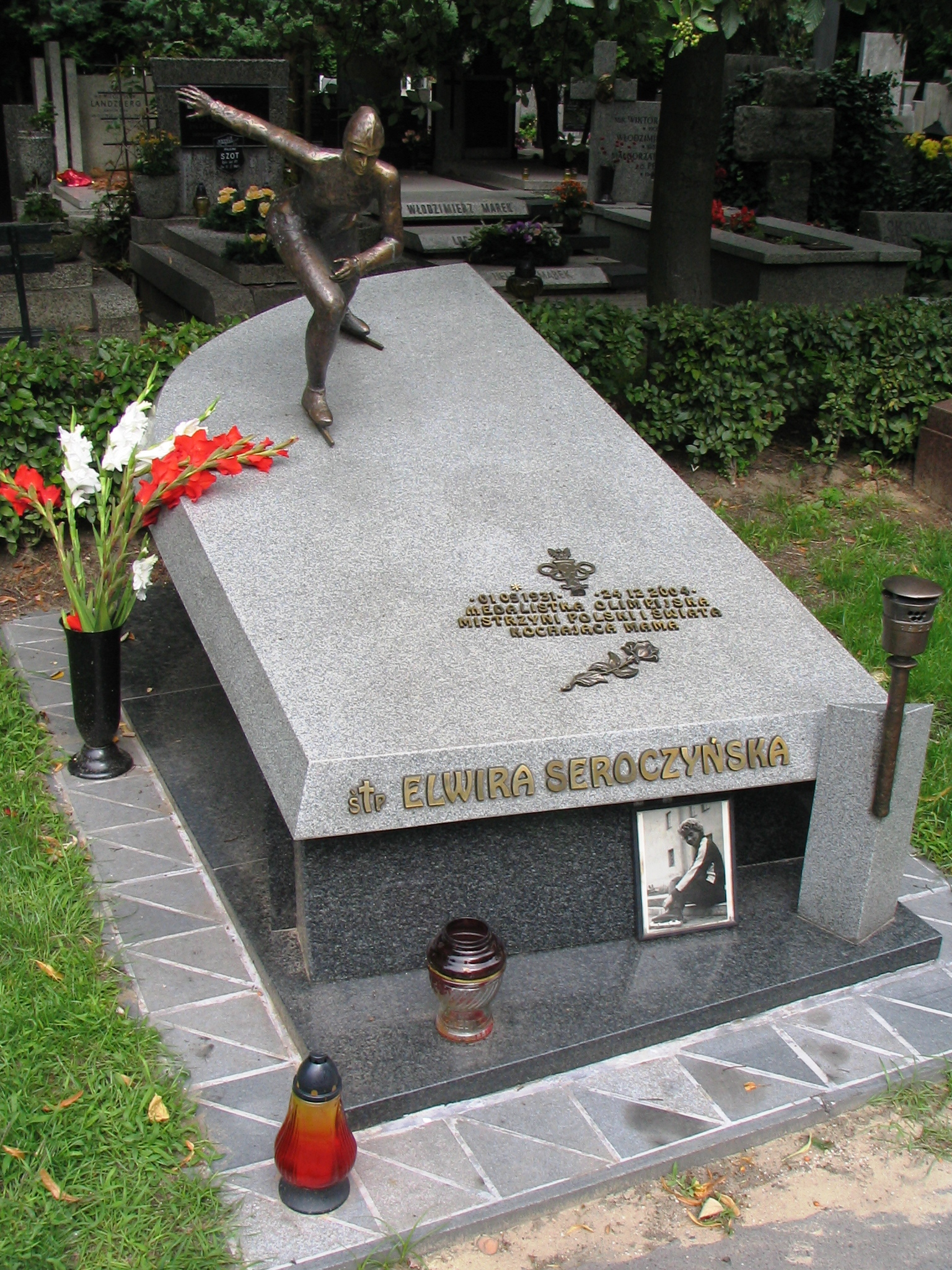
Elwira's grave at Powązki Military Cemetery

Participations
Year	Polish Allround	Polish Distance	Wch Allround	Winter Olympics
1951	2nd	3rd 500m 1st 1000m		
1952	1st	1st 500m 3rd 3000m 1st 1500m 3rd 5000m		
1953	1st	1st 500m 1st 3000m 1st 1500m 2nd 5000m		
1954	1st	2nd 500m 1st 3000m 1st 1000m 1st 5000m		
1956	2nd	2nd 500m 2nd 1500m 2nd 1000m 3rd 3000m		
1957	2nd	1st 500m 2nd 1500m 2nd 1000m 3rd 3000m	11th	
1959	1st	1st 500m 1st 1500m 1st 1000m 2nd 3000m	10th	
1960			11th	6th 500m 2nd 1500m fell 1000m 7th 3000m
1961	3rd	1st 500m 3rd 1500m 3rd 1000m 3rd 3000m	14th	
1962			9th	
1963	1st	1st 500m 2nd 1500m 1st 1000m 1st 3000m	NC21	
1964		4th 500m 4th 1500m 2nd 1000m		16th 500m 26th 1500m 22nd 1000m

medal count
Championships	Gold medal	Silver medal	Bronze medal
Winter Olympics		1	
World Speed Skating Championships			
Polish Allround	5	3	1
Polish Distance	17	10	8

== Personal records ==
Personal records
Distance	Time	Place	Date
500 m	46.8	Squaw Valley	20 Feb 1960
1,000 m	1:39.2	Karuizawa	22 Feb 1963
1,500 m	2:25.7	Squaw Valley	21 Feb 1960
3,000 m	5:27.3	Squaw Valley	23 Feb 1960
5,000 m	10:10.0	Zakopane	1964
Mini combination	207.850	Medeo	20/21 Jan 1960
Small combination	247.850	Zakopane	01/03 Feb 1953
Old combination	228.250	Medeo	21/22 Jan 1955

Best times in Poland
Distance	Time	Place	Date
500 m	48.3	Zakopane	25 Feb 1961
1,000 m	1:38.4	Zakopane	12 Jan 1964
1,500 m	2:37.3	Zakopane	25 Feb 1961
3,000 m	5:36.2	Zakopane	27 Jan 1963
5,000 m	10:10.0	Zakopane	1964
Mini combination	208.166	Zakopane	25/26 Feb 1961
Small combination	247.850	Zakopane	01/03 Feb 1953
Old combination	235.391	Zakopane	05/06 Feb 1954
