= Helena Pilejczyk =

Polish speed skater (1931–2023)

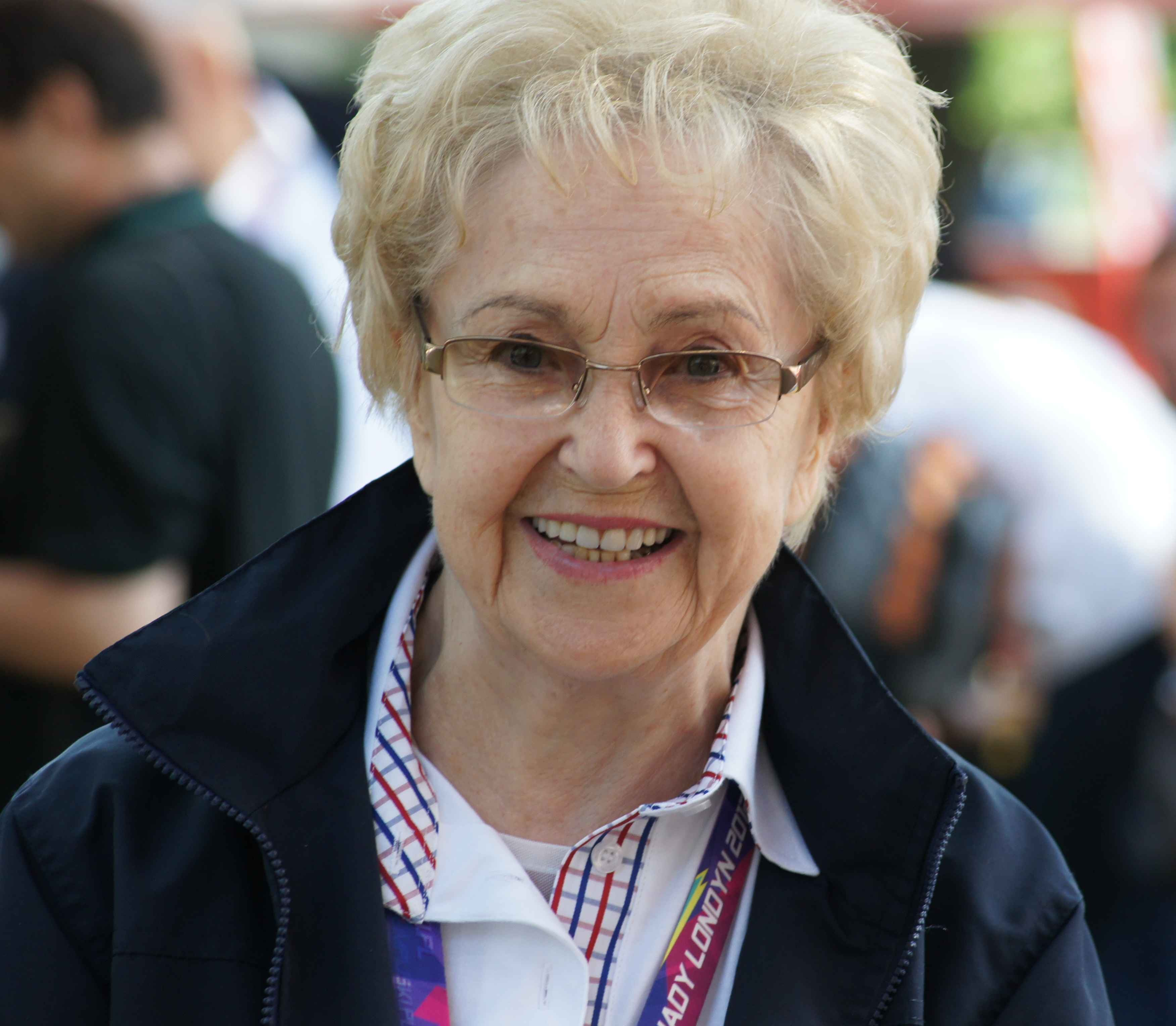
- Pilejczyk in 2011

Personal information
- Born: Helena Majcher; 1 April 1931 Zieluń, Poland
- Died: 12 November 2023 (aged 92) Elbląg, Poland
- Height: 1.59 m (5 ft 3 in)
- Weight: 51 kg (112 lb)

Sport
- Country: Poland
- Sport: Speed skating
Medal record
Women's speed skating
Representing Poland
Olympic Games
Bronze medal – third place	1960 Squaw Valley	1,500 m

Helena Pilejczyk (née Majcher; 1 April 1931 – 12 November 2023) was a Polish speed skater. Pilejczyk was the Olympic bronze medal winner in the 1,500 m in Squaw Valley (1960). Her first appearance at the Polish national Championships speed skating was in 1953, while the last time she could be seen skating internationally was during the masters games of 2002, where she competed in the category for female skaters 70 years and above. She achieved 40 Polish skating records and won 37 Polish titles for distance, allround and relay race events. Pilejczyk died in Elbląg on 12 November 2023, at the age of 92.

== Results ==
Participations
Year	Polish Allround	Polish Distance	Wch Allround	Winter Olympics
1953	> 5th	5th 1500m 4th 5000m		
1954	2nd	1st 500m 2nd 3000m 2nd 1000m 2nd 5000m		
1956	1st	1st 500m 1st 1500m 1st 1000m 1st 3000m		
1957	1st	2nd 500m 1st 1500m 1st 1000m 1st 3000m	9th	
1958	1st	1st 500m 1st 1500m 1st 1000m 1st 3000m	5th	
1960			5th	12th 500m 3rd 1500m 5th 1000m 6th 3000m
1961	2nd	3rd 500m 2nd 1500m 2nd 1000m 2nd 3000m	7th	
1962	1st	1st 500m 1st 1500m 1st 1000m 1st 3000m	NC17	
1963	2nd	2nd 500m 1st 1500m 2nd 1000m 2nd 3000m	NC25	
1964		3rd 500m 3rd 1500m 3rd 1000m 3rd 3000m		23rd 500m 25th 1500m 15th 1000m 26th 3000m
1965	8th			
1966	4th	2nd 1500m 3rd 1000m		
1967	3rd			
1968	2nd	5th 500m 2nd 1500m 3rd 1000m 2nd 3000m	NC32	
1969	1st	3rd 500m 1st 1500m 2nd 1000m 1st 3000m	NC24	
1970	2nd	3rd 500m 2nd 1500m 3rd 1000m 1st 3000m		
1971	1st	3rd 500m 1st 1500m 1st 1000m 1st 3000m	NC26	
1972	4th	5th 500m 2nd 1500m 5th 1000m 1st 3000m		

medal count
Championships	Gold medal	Silver medal	Bronze medal
Winter Olympics			1
World Allround			
European Championships			
Polish Allround	6	5	1
Polish Distance	24	16	11

== Personal records ==
Personal records
Distance	Time	Place	Date
500 m	47.8	Karuizawa	21 February 1963
1,000 m	1:35.8	Squaw Valley	22 February 1960
1,500 m	2:27.1	Squaw Valley	21 February 1960
3,000 m	5:15.2	Zakopane	29 December 1969
5,000 m	10:06.2	Medeo	22 January 1955
Mini combination	199.766	Zakopane	5/6 January 1971
Old combination	229.387	Medeo	21/22 January 1955

Best times in Poland
Distance	Time	Place	Date
500 m	47.8	Zakopane	11 January 1964
1,000 m	1:37.4	Zakopane	6 January 1971
1,500 m	2:29.04	Zakopane	5 February 1972
3,000 m	5:15.2	Zakopane	29 December 1969
5,000 m	10:35.6	Zakopane	6 February 1954
Mini combination	199.766	Zakopane	5/6 January 1971
Old combination	236.353	Zakopane	5/6 February 1954
