= Barbara Gorgoń =

Polish luger (1936–2020)

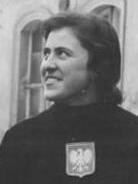
- Barbara Gorgoń in 1959

Medal record

Luge

Representing Poland

World Championships
Bronze medal – third place	1958 Krynica	Women's singles

Barbara Gorgoń (sometimes shown as Barbara Gorgoń-Flont; born 11 January 1936 in Gródek nad Dunajcem - 13 April 2020) was a Polish former luger who competed between the late 1950s and the mid-1960s. She won the bronze medal in the women's singles event at the 1958 FIL World Luge Championships in Krynica, Poland.

Gorgoń also finished fifth in the women's singles event at the 1964 Winter Olympics in Innsbruck.
