= Józef Karpiel =

Polish Nordic combined skier

Personal information
- Nationality: Polish
- Born: 18 January 1932; Kościelisko, Poland
- Died: 29 November 1994 (aged 62); Zakopane, Poland

Sport
- Sport: Nordic combined

Józef Karpiel (18 January 1932 – 29 November 1994) was a Polish skier. He competed in the Nordic combined event at the 1960 Winter Olympics.
