= Irena Pawełczyk =

Polish luger

Medal record

Luge

European Championships
Gold medal – first place	1962 Weissenbach	Women's singles

Irena Pawełczyk (born 9 March 1934 in Katowice) is a Polish luger who competed in the early 1960s. She won the gold medal in the women's singles event at the 1962 FIL European Luge Championships in Weissenbach, Austria.

Pawełczyk also finished fourth in the women's singles event at the 1964 Winter Olympics in Innsbruck.
