= Völs am Schlern =

Völs am Schlern Fíe / Fië (Ladin)
- Comune
- Gemeinde Völs am Schlern (German); Comune di Fiè allo Sciliar (Italian)
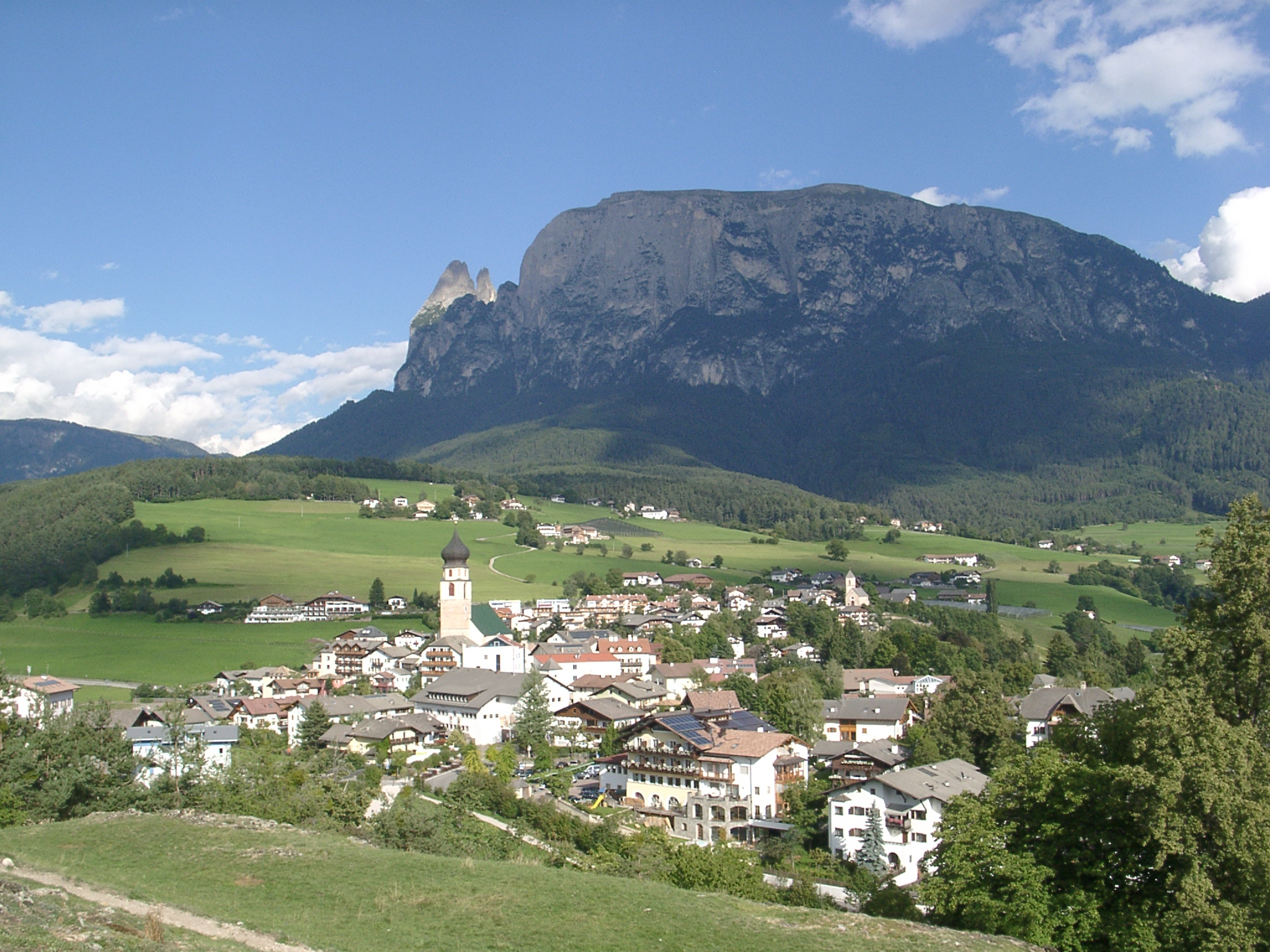
- Völs am Schlern

- Location within Italy Location within Trentino-Alto Adige/Südtirol
- Coordinates: 46°31′N 11°30′E
- Country: Italy
- Region: Trentino-Alto Adige/Südtirol
- Province: South Tyrol (BZ)
- Frazioni: Blumau (Prato all'Isarco), Oberaicha (Aica di Sopra), Peterbühl, St. Anton (S. Antonio), Obervöls (Fiè di Sopra), Prösels (Presule), Prösler Ried (Novale di Presule), St. Kathrein (Santa Caterina), St. Konstantin (San Costantino), Ums (Umes), Unteraicha (Aica di Sotto), Untervöls (Fiè di Sotto), Völser Ried (Novale di Fiè)

Government
  - Mayor: Othmar Stampfer (SVP)

Area
  - Total: 44.4 km^{2} (17.1 sq mi)
- Elevation: 880 m (2,890 ft)

Population (Nov. 2010)
  - Total: 3,463
  - Density: 78.0/km^{2} (202/sq mi)
- Demonym(s): German: Völser; Italian: di Fiè
- Time zone: UTC+1 (CET)
  - Summer (DST): UTC+2 (CEST)
- Postal code: 39050
- Dialing code: 0471
- Website: Official website

Völs am Schlern (Austrian German: [ˈfœls am ˈʃlɛrn]; Italian: Fiè allo Sciliar [ˈfjɛ allo ʃʃiˈljar]; Ladin: Fíe or Fië), often abbreviated to Völs, is a municipality in South Tyrol in northern Italy. It is located at the foot of the Schlern mountain, about 12 kilometres (7 miles) east of Bolzano.

== Geography ==
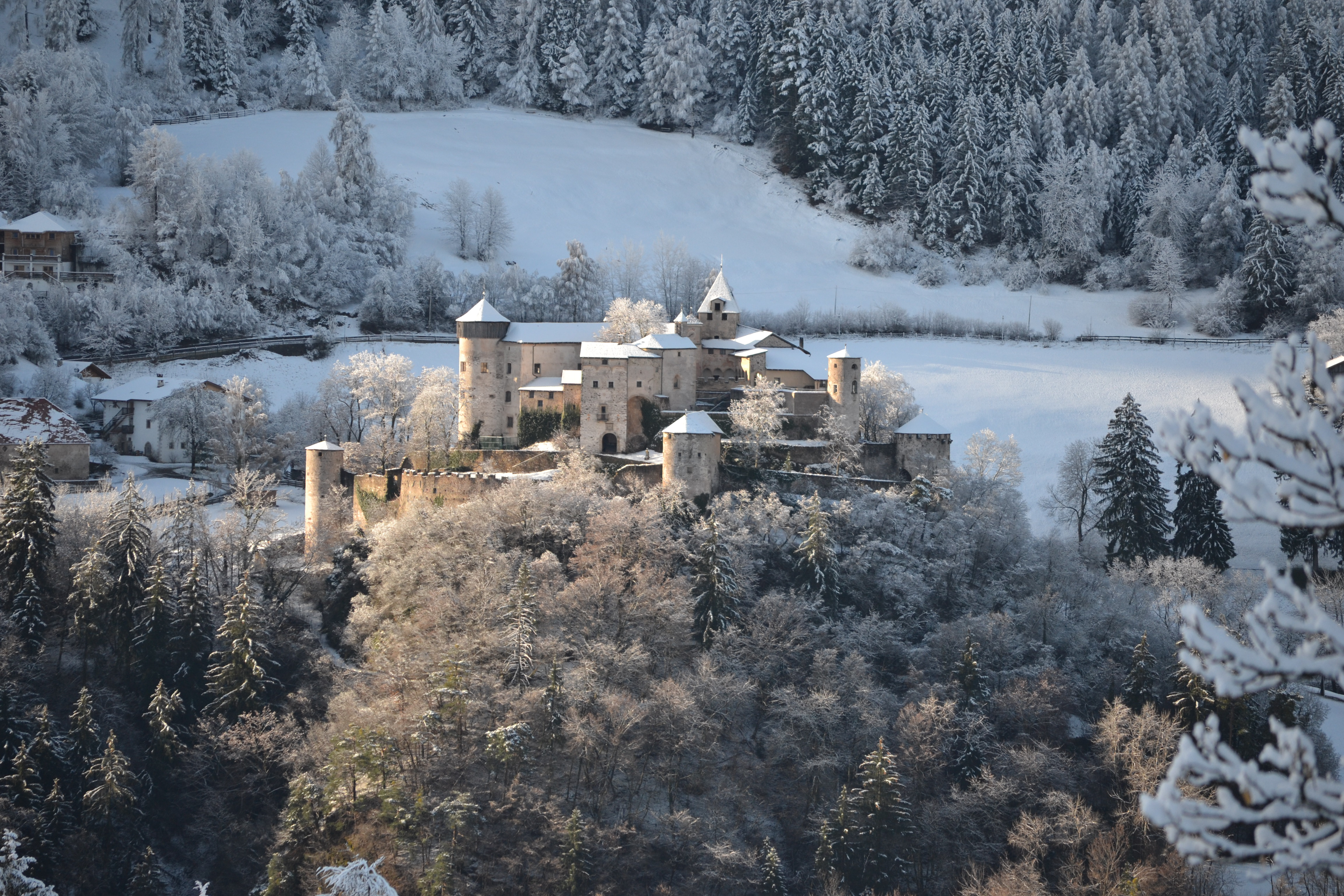
Prösels Castle

As of November 30, 2010, it had a population of 3,463 and an area of 44.4 square kilometres (17.1 mi^{2}).

The municipality of Völs am Schlern contains the frazioni (subdivisions, mainly villages and hamlets) Blumau (Prato all'Isarco), Oberaicha (Aica di Sopra), Peterbühl, St. Anton (S. Antonio), Obervöls (Fiè di Sopra), Prösels (Presule), Prösler Ried (Novale di Presule), St. Kathrein (Santa Caterina), St. Konstantin (San Costantino), Ums (Umes), Unteraicha (Aica di Sotto), Untervöls (Fiè di Sotto), and Völser Ried (Novale di Fiè).

Völs am Schlern borders the following municipalities: Kastelruth, Karneid, Ritten and Tiers.

Prösels Castle is also located in the municipality.

== History ==
The hamlet appears for the first time in the Carolingian period in a deed issued by king Arnolf in 888 named as “Fellis“, then located within the Bavarian duchy (“in Bauuariae partibus sita inter montana“).

=== Coat-of-arms ===
The emblem is party per cross, the first and the fourth are sable with central band of argent, the first represents a cross and the fourth a rose both on gules. The second and third a column of argent with an or crown on a gules background. The emblem is a combination of the insignias of three local families, the first and fourth the Knights of Völs and Prösels and the third the Count Colonna. The emblem was adopted in 1966.

== Society ==
=== Linguistic distribution ===
According to the 2024 census, 92.75% of the population speak German, 6.45% Italian and 0.80% Ladin as first language.

=== Demographic evolution ===
Historical population

Year	Pop.	±%
1860	?	—
1870	?	—
1880	1,615	—
1900	?	—
1910	1,612	—

Year	Pop.	±%
1921	1,677	+4.0%
1931	1,937	+15.5%
1936	1,948	+0.6%
1951	2,079	+6.7%
1961	2,025	−2.6%

Year	Pop.	±%
1971	2,167	+7.0%
1981	2,520	+16.3%
1991	2,649	+5.1%
2001	3,038	+14.7%

Source: Data from ISTAT

== Culture ==
=== Music ===
Every summer Semper Music International Festival brings internationally renowned musicians and students from all over the world to Vōls am Schlern.
