= Girenbad =

Village in Switzerland

Coordinates: 47°18′31″N 8°52′20″E

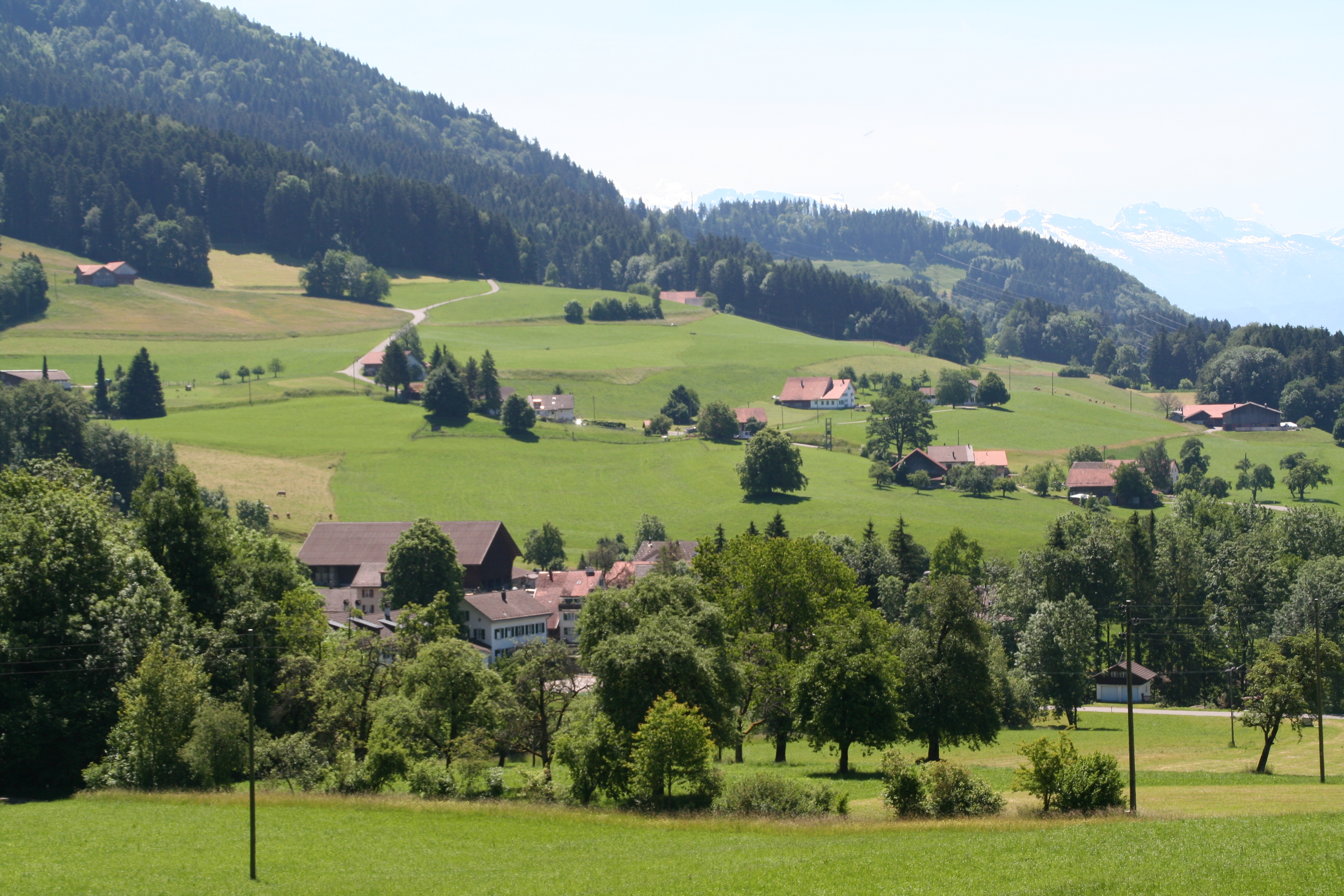
Girenbad

Girenbad is a village in the municipality of Hinwil in the Canton of Zürich, Switzerland.
