= Weißenbach bei Liezen =

- Former municipality
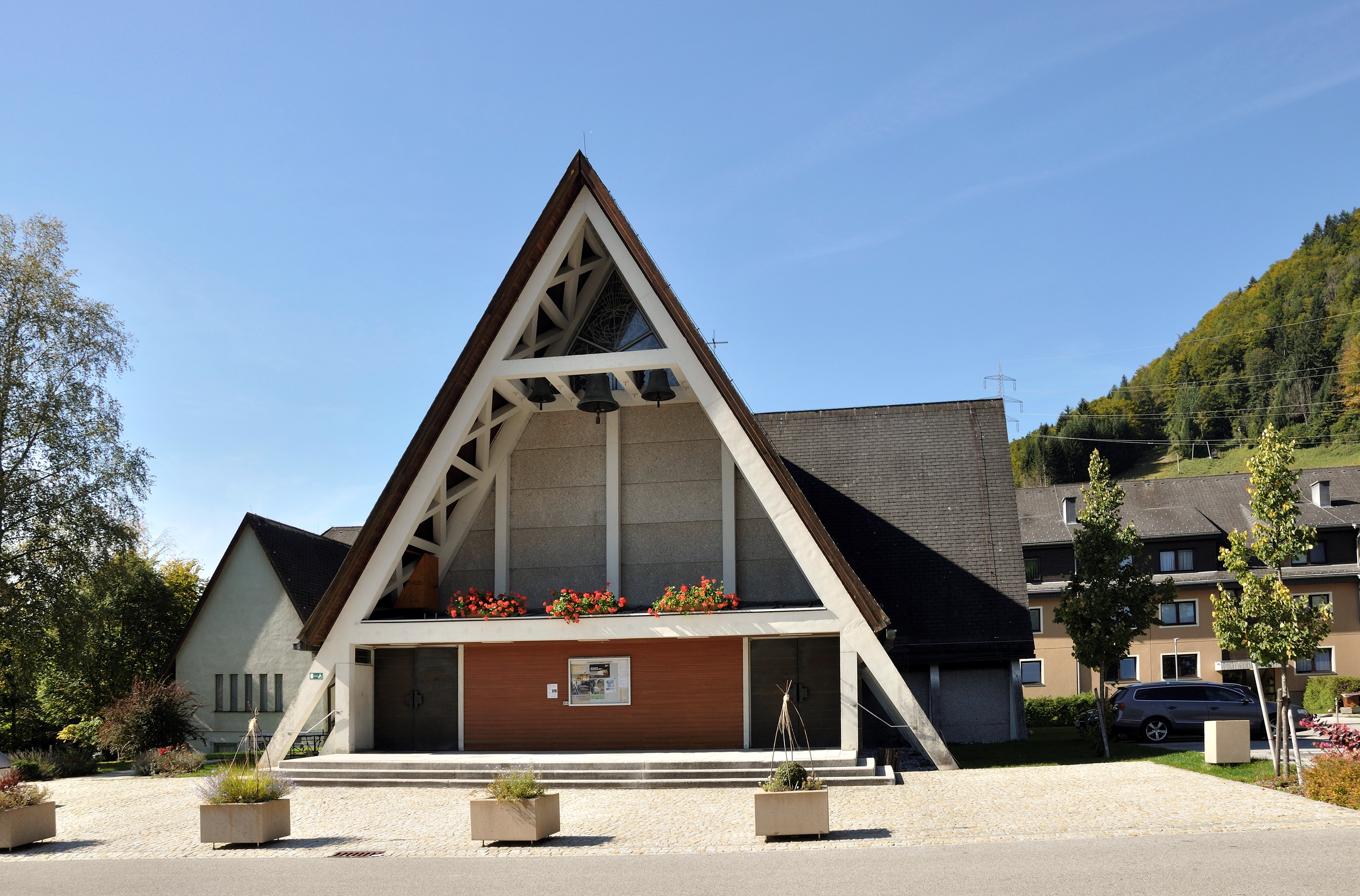
- Church in Weißenbach

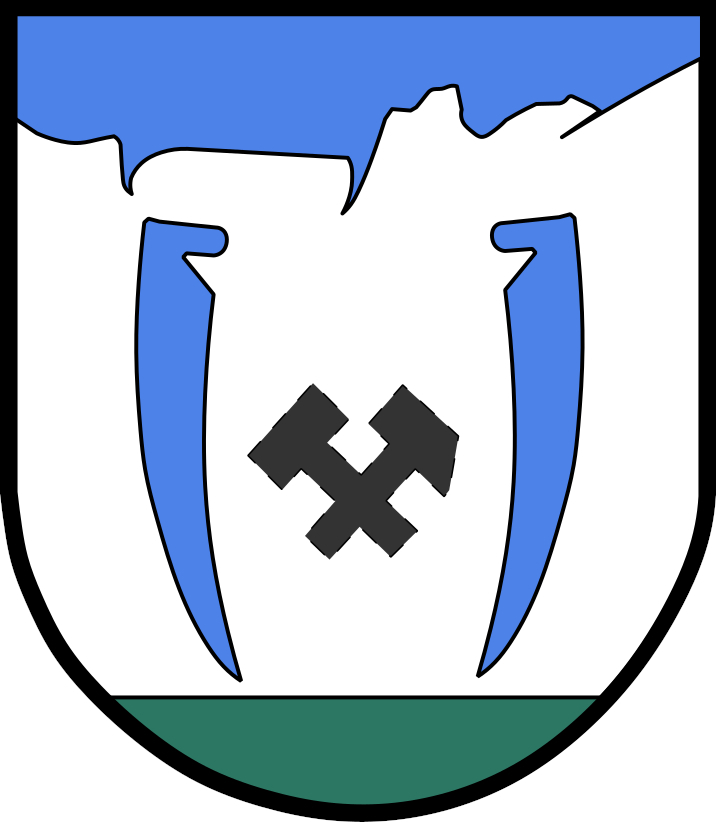
- Coat of arms

- Location within Austria
- Coordinates: 47°34′17″N 14°12′07″E
- Country: Austria
- State: Styria
- District: Liezen

Area
  - Total: 35.82 km^{2} (13.83 sq mi)
- Elevation: 654 m (2,146 ft)

Population (1 January 2016)
  - Total: 1,117
  - Density: 31.18/km^{2} (80.77/sq mi)
- Time zone: UTC+1 (CET)
  - Summer (DST): UTC+2 (CEST)
- Postal code: 8940
- Area code: 03612
- Vehicle registration: LI
- Website: www.weissenbach.at

Weißenbach bei Liezen is a former municipality in the district of Liezen in the Austrian state of Styria. Since the 2015 Styria municipal structural reform, it is part of the municipality Liezen.

== Population ==
Historical population
Year	Pop.	±%
1869	465	—
1880	459	−1.3%
1890	468	+2.0%
1900	416	−11.1%
1910	378	−9.1%
1923	382	+1.1%
1934	418	+9.4%
1939	648	+55.0%
1951	684	+5.6%
1961	709	+3.7%
1971	836	+17.9%
1981	965	+15.4%
1991	1,047	+8.5%
2001	1,158	+10.6%
2011	1,116	−3.6%
