= France at the 1968 Winter Olympics =

- IOC code: FRA
- NOC: French Olympic Committee

in Grenoble
- Competitors: 75 (64 men, 11 women) in 10 sports
- Flag bearer: Gilbert Poirot (ski jumping)
- Medals Ranked 3rd: Gold 4 Silver 3 Bronze 2 Total 9

Winter Olympics appearances (overview)
- 1924; 1928; 1932; 1936; 1948; 1952; 1956; 1960; 1964; 1968; 1972; 1976; 1980; 1984; 1988; 1992; 1994; 1998; 2002; 2006; 2010; 2014; 2018; 2022; 2026

France was the host nation for the 1968 Winter Olympics in Grenoble. It was the second time that France had hosted the Winter Olympic Games (after the 1924 Games in Chamonix), and the fourth time overall (after the 1900 and 1924 Summer Olympics, both in Paris).

== Medalists ==
Medal	Name	Sport	Event
Gold	Jean-Claude Killy	Alpine skiing	Men's downhill
Gold	Jean-Claude Killy	Alpine skiing	Men's giant slalom
Gold	Jean-Claude Killy	Alpine skiing	Men's slalom
Gold	Marielle Goitschel	Alpine skiing	Women's slalom
Silver	Guy Périllat	Alpine skiing	Men's downhill
Silver	Isabelle Mir	Alpine skiing	Women's downhill
Silver	Annie Famose	Alpine skiing	Women's giant slalom
Bronze	Annie Famose	Alpine skiing	Women's slalom
Bronze	Patrick Pera	Figure skating	Men's singles

== Alpine skiing ==
Men

Athlete	Event	Race 1		Race 2		Total	
Athlete	Event	Time	Rank	Time	Rank	Time	Rank
Léo Lacroix	Downhill					2:03.86	20
Bernard Orcel	Downhill					2:02.22	8
Guy Périllat	Downhill					1:59.93	2nd place, silver medalist(s)
Jean-Claude Killy	Downhill					1:59.85	1st place, gold medalist(s)
Bernard Orcel	Giant Slalom	DSQ	–	–	–	DSQ	–
Georges Mauduit	Giant Slalom	1:44.86	4	1:48.92	12	3:33.78	9
Guy Périllat	Giant Slalom	1:44.78	3	1:47.28	5	3:32.06	4
Jean-Claude Killy	Giant Slalom	1:42.74	1	1:46.54	2	3:29.28	1st place, gold medalist(s)

Men's slalom

Athlete	Heat 1		Heat 2		Final					
Athlete	Time	Rank	Time	Rank	Time 1	Rank	Time 2	Rank	Total	Rank
Jean-Pierre Augert	52.10	3	54.91	1 QF	51.32	17	DSQ	–	DSQ	–
Guy Périllat	57.71	3	55.37	1 QF	49.89	6	DSQ	–	DSQ	–
Alain Penz	54.63	2 QF	–	–	49.89	6	51.25	11	1:41.14	8
Jean-Claude Killy	49.89	1 QF	–	–	49.37	1	50.36	4	1:39.73	1st place, gold medalist(s)

Women

Athlete	Event	Race 1		Race 2		Total	
Athlete	Event	Time	Rank	Time	Rank	Time	Rank
Florence Steurer	Downhill					1:43.00	9
Marielle Goitschel	Downhill					1:42.95	8
Annie Famose	Downhill					1:42.15	5
Isabelle Mir	Downhill					1:41.33	2nd place, silver medalist(s)
Marielle Goitschel	Giant Slalom					1:56.09	7
Isabelle Mir	Giant Slalom					1:56.07	6
Florence Steurer	Giant Slalom					1:54.75	4
Annie Famose	Giant Slalom					1:54.61	2nd place, silver medalist(s)
Florence Steurer	Slalom	DSQ	–	–	–	DSQ	–
Annie Famose	Slalom	42.21	7	45.68	3	1:27.89	3rd place, bronze medalist(s)
Isabelle Mir	Slalom	42.14	6	46.08	4	1:28.22	5
Marielle Goitschel	Slalom	40.27	2	45.59	2	1:25.86	1st place, gold medalist(s)

== Biathlon ==
Men

Event	Athlete	Time	Penalties	Adjusted time ^{1}	Rank
20 km	Guy Daraffourg	1'23:51.4	18	1'41:51.4	58
20 km	Louis Romand	1'25:55.2	12	1'37:55.2	57
20 km	Aimé Gruet-Masson	1'20:50.4	11	1'31:50.4	42
20 km	Jean-Claude Viry	1'19:16.2	10	1'29:16.2	35

^{1} One minute added per close miss (a hit in the outer ring), two minutes added per complete miss.

Men's 4 x 7.5 km relay

Athletes	Race		
Athletes	Misses ^{2}	Time	Rank
Daniel Claudon; Serge Legrand; Aimé Gruet-Masson; Jean-Claude Viry	10	2'31:12.9	10

^{2} A penalty loop of 200 metres had to be skied per missed target.

== Bobsleigh ==
Sled	Athletes	Event	Run 1		Run 2		Run 3		Run 4		Total	
Sled	Athletes	Event	Time	Rank	Time	Rank	Time	Rank	Time	Rank	Time	Rank
FRA-1	Bertrand Croset; Henri Sirvain	Two-man	1:12.36	15	1:12.79	16	1:12.35	11	1:13.78	20	4:51.28	16
FRA-2	Gérard Christaud-Pipola; Jacques Christaud-Pipola	Two-man	1:11.24	6	1:34.47	20	1:12.49	13	1:13.47	18	5:11.67	20

Sled	Athletes	Event	Run 1		Run 2		Total	
Sled	Athletes	Event	Time	Rank	Time	Rank	Time	Rank
FRA-1	Francis Luiggi; André Patey; Gérard Monrazel; Maurice Grether	Four-man	1:10.65	7	1:08.19	7	2:18.84	7
FRA-2	Bertrand Croset; Claude Roussel; Louis Courtois; Henri Sirvain	Four-man	1:11.11	12	1:08.61	11	2:19.72	11

== Cross-country skiing ==
Men

Event	Athlete	Race	
Event	Athlete	Time	Rank
15 km	Jean Jobez	53:22.1	46
15 km	Félix Mathieu	52:58.8	44
15 km	Victor Arbez	51:20.5	28
15 km	Roger Pires	50:52.6	24
30 km	Roger Pires	1'45:54.6	43
30 km	Luc Colin	1'45:40.7	42
30 km	Philippe Baradel	1'45:33.3	41
30 km	Jean Jobez	1'45:08.8	39
50 km	Luc Colin	2'48:57.9	44
50 km	Claude Legrand	2'45:36.9	41
50 km	Fernand Borrel	2'45:10.6	40
50 km	Roger Pires	2'36:48.8	24

Men's 4 × 10 km relay

Athletes	Race	
Athletes	Time	Rank
Félix Mathieu; Victor Arbez; Philippe Baradel; Roger Pires	2'21:23.0	11

== Figure skating ==
Men

Athlete	CF	FS	Points	Places	Rank
Jacques Mrozek	18	20	1601.0	179	20
Philippe Pélissier	14	12	1706.0	114	13
Patrick Péra	3	7	1864.5	31	3rd place, bronze medalist(s)

Women

Athlete	CF	FS	Points	Places	Rank
Sylvaine Duban	19	29	1551.4	219	27
Micheline Joubert	28	15	1594.8	182	20

== Ice hockey ==
=== Consolation round ===
Teams in this group play for 9th-14th places. France entered in this round, from the start, they did not play for a medal.

Rank	Team	Pld	W	L	T	GF	GA	Pts
9	Yugoslavia	5	5	0	0	33	9	10
10	Japan	5	4	1	0	27	12	8
11	Norway	5	3	2	0	15	15	6
12	Romania	5	2	3	0	22	23	4
13	Austria	5	1	4	0	12	27	2
14	France	5	0	5	0	9	32	0

Norway – France 4:1 (1:1, 2:0, 1:0)
Goalscorers: Hagensen, Smefjell, Dalsören, Mikkelsen – Liberman.

France – Romania 3:7 (0:2, 0:2, 3:3)
Goalscorers: Itzicsohn, Mazza, Lacarriere – Iuliu Szabo 2, Florescu 2, Pana, Geza Szabo, Stefan.

France – Austria 2:5 (0:1, 2:3, 0:1)
Goalscorers: Faucomprez, Caux – Puschnig 2, Kirchbaumer, St. John, Schupp.

France – (Socialist Federal Republic of Yugoslavia) Yugoslavia 1:10 (0:6, 0:1, 1:3)
Goalscorers: Itzicsohn – Tisler 3, Ivo Jan 2, Felc 2, Beravs, Roman Smolej, Hiti.

France – Japan 2:6 (0:0, 0:4, 2:2)
Goalscorers: Mazza, Faucomprez – Ebina 2, Hikigi, Itoh, Okajima, Araki.

=== Contestants ===
14. FRANCE
Goaltenders: Jean-Claude Sozzi, Bernard Deschamps
Defence: Joel Godeau, Claude Blanchard, Philippe Lacarriere, René Blanchard, Joel Gauvin
Forwards: Bernard Cabanis, Gerard Faucomprez, Alain Mazza, Olivier Prechac, Gilbert Lepre, Patrick Pourtanel, Michel Caux, Gilbert Itzicsohn, Daniel Grando, Patrick Francheterre, Charles Liberman.

== Luge ==
Men

Athlete	Run 1		Run 2		Run 3		Total	
Athlete	Time	Rank	Time	Rank	Time	Rank	Time	Rank
Ion Pervilhac	1:01.98	38	1:02.99	40	1:01.45	37	3:06.42	38
Jean-Pierre De Petro	1:01.03	36	1:01.24	34	1:01.26	35	3:03.53	35
Georges Tresallet	59.75	28	1:00.41	31	1:00.21	30	3:00.37	29

(Men's) Doubles

Athletes	Run 1		Run 2		Total	
Athletes	Time	Rank	Time	Rank	Time	Rank
Georges Tresallet; Ion Pervilhac	49.97	11	49.29	9	1:39.26	11

Women

Athlete	Run 1		Run 2		Run 3		Total	
Athlete	Time	Rank	Time	Rank	Time	Rank	Time	Rank
Jacqueline Barasinski	51.96	20	52.39	21	52.44	20	2:36.79	20
Sylvette Grassi	51.85	17	52.08	20	52.55	21	2:36.48	19

== Nordic combined ==
Events:

- normal hill ski jumping (Three jumps, best two counted and shown here.)
- 15 km cross-country skiing

Athlete	Event	Ski Jumping				Cross-country			Total	
Athlete	Event	Distance 1	Distance 2	Points	Rank	Time	Points	Rank	Points	Rank
Jean-Marie Bourgeois	Individual	53.5	52.5	111.4	40	50:18.0	214.50	9	325.90	38
Émile Salvi	Individual	63.0	63.0	158.6	39	53:44.3	173.78	32	332.38	37
Gervais Poirot	Individual	53.0	53.0	102.4	41	50:22.2	213.58	10	315.98	41

== Ski jumping ==
Athlete	Event	Jump 1		Jump 2		Total	
Athlete	Event	Distance	Points	Distance	Points	Points	Rank
Michel Saint Lezer	Normal hill	67.0	85.0	64.0	79.7	164.7	50
Maurice Arbez	Normal hill	70.0	91.3	68.5	87.4	178.7	41
Alain Macle	Normal hill	74.0	104.2	72.5	99.8	204.0	18
Gilbert Poirot	Normal hill	76.5	106.7	73.5	100.4	207.1	10
Michel Saint Lezer	Large hill	85.5	80.6	76.0	62.3	142.9	54
Maurice Arbez	Large hill	87.0	83.2	79.0	66.0	149.2	50
Alain Macle	Large hill	89.5	93.7	93.5	100.3	194.0	17
Gilbert Poirot	Large hill	97.0	103.7	94.0	100.0	203.7	10

== Speed skating ==
Men

Event	Athlete	Race	
Event	Athlete	Time	Rank
500 m	François Perrenoud	44.1	46
500 m	Michel Thépénier	43.8	45
1500 m	François Perrenoud	2:14.0	37
1500 m	Michel Thépénier	2:13.7	36
5000 m	François Perrenoud	8:07.5	31
5000 m	Michel Thépénier	8:06.2	30
10,000 m	François Perrenoud	17:10.2	26

Women

Event	Athlete	Race	
Event	Athlete	Time	Rank
500 m	Martine Ivangine	48.5	22
500 m	Marie-Louise Perrenoud	48.2	19
1000 m	Patricia Demartini	1:44.6	28
1000 m	Marie-Louise Perrenoud	1:39.3	24
1000 m	Martine Ivangine	1:37.4	17
1500 m	Patricia Demartini	2:40.6	29
1500 m	Marie-Louise Perrenoud	2:39.2	28
1500 m	Martine Ivangine	2:29.9	14
3000 m	Marie-Louise Perrenoud	5:41.7	25
3000 m	Martine Ivangine	5:19.3	15
