= Bobsleigh at the 1972 Winter Olympics – Four-man =

Four-man at the XI Olympic Winter Games
- Venue: Sapporo Teine
- Dates: 11–12 February 1972
- Competitors: 72 from 11 nations
- Winning time: 4:43.07

Medalists
1st place, gold medalist(s)		Switzerland; Jean Wicki, Hans Leutenegger, Werner Camichel, Edy Hubacher
2nd place, silver medalist(s)		Italy; Nevio De Zordo; Adriano Frassinelli; Corrado Dal Fabbro; Gianni Bonichon
3rd place, bronze medalist(s)		West Germany; Wolfgang Zimmerer, Stefan Gaisreiter, Walter Steinbauer, Peter Utzschneider

The four-man bobsleigh competition at the 1972 Winter Olympics in Sapporo was held on 11 and 12 February, at Sapporo Teine.

== Results ==
Rank	Country	Athletes	Run 1	Run 2	Run 3	Run 4	Total
1st place, gold medalist(s)	Switzerland (SUI-1)	Jean Wicki; Hans Leutenegger; Werner Camichel; Edy Hubacher	70.71	71.44	70.21	70.71	4:43.07
2nd place, silver medalist(s)	Italy (ITA-1)	Nevio De Zordo; Adriano Frassinelli; Corrado Dal Fabbro; Gianni Bonichon	71.39	71.33	70.19	70.92	4:43.83
3rd place, bronze medalist(s)	West Germany (FRG-1)	Wolfgang Zimmerer; Stefan Gaisreiter; Walter Steinbauer; Peter Utzschneider	71.18	71.75	70.30	70.69	4:43.92
4	Switzerland (SUI-2)	Hans Candrian; Erwin Juon; Gaudenz Beeli; Heinz Schenker	72.36	71.89	70.09	70.22	4:44.56
5	West Germany (FRG-2)	Horst Floth; Donat Ertel; Walter Gillik; Pepi Bader	70.83	71.88	71.06	71.32	4:45.09
6	Austria (AUT-1)	Herbert Gruber; Utz Chwalla; Josef Eder; Josef Oberhauser	71.20	72.46	71.11	71.00	4:45.77
7	Austria (AUT-2)	Werner Delle Karth; Werner Moser; Walter Delle Karth; Fritz Sperling	71.58	72.46	71.16	71.46	4:46.66
8	Italy (ITA-2)	Gianfranco Gaspari; Roberto Zandonella; Mario Armano; Luciano De Paolis	71.89	72.49	71.11	71.24	4:46.73
9	France	Patrick Parisot; Yves Bonsang; Alain Roy; Gilles Morda	71.79	72.18	71.27	71.51	4:46.75
10	Romania	Ion Panţuru; Ion Zangor; Dumitru Pascu; Dumitru Focşeneanu	72.07	72.65	71.08	71.32	4:47.12
11	Sweden	Carl-Erik Eriksson; Tom Mentzer; Thomas Gustafsson; Jan Johansson	72.14	72.42	71.43	71.41	4:47.40
12	Japan (JPN-1)	Susumu Esashika; Kazumi Abe; Rikio Sato; Yoshiyuki Ichihashi	71.51	72.99	71.42	72.00	4:47.92
13	Canada	Hans Gehrig; David Richardson; Peter Blakeley; Andrew Faulds	72.61	72.43	70.76	72.26	4:48.06
14	United States (USA-2)	Boris Said, Jr. James Copley; Ken Morris; Phil Duprey	72.31	72.34	71.80	71.98	4:48.43
15	Great Britain (GBR-2)	John Hammond; Jackie Price; Alan Jones; Peter Clifford	73.00	72.49	72.72	72.25	4:50.46
16	Great Britain (GBR-1)	John Evelyn; Mike Freeman; Gomer Lloyd; Bill Sweet	72.83	73.65	72.55	72.00	4:51.03
	Japan (JPN-2)	Toshihisa Nagata; Hiroshi Inaba; Koichi Sugawara; Akihiko Suzuki	71.51	72.99	DQ	DQ	DQ
	United States (USA-1)	Jim Hickey Jr. Jim Bridges; Howard Siler, Jr. Thomas Becker	DQ	DQ	DQ	DQ	DQ
