= Bobsleigh at the 1968 Winter Olympics – Two-man =

Two-man at the X Olympic Winter Games
- Venue: L'Alpe d'Huez
- Dates: 8–11 February 1968
- Competitors: 44 from 11 nations
- Winning time: 4:41.54

Medalists
| 1st place, gold medalist(s) | | Eugenio Monti, Luciano De Paolis | Italy |
| 2nd place, silver medalist(s) | | Horst Floth, Pepi Bader | West Germany |
| 3rd place, bronze medalist(s) | | Ion Panţuru, Nicolae Neagoe | Romania |

The Two-man bobsleigh competition at the 1968 Winter Olympics in Grenoble was held on 4 and 5 February, at L'Alpe d'Huez. There was a tie for first place. Despite initially ruling that both teams would be awarded the gold medals, the judges awarded the sole gold to the Italian team based on their fastest single heat time. Panturu and Neagoe are the only Romanians to medal at the Winter Olympics as of the 2026 Games.

== Results ==
| Rank | Country | Athletes | Run 1 | Run 2 | Run 3 | Run 4 | Total |
|---|---|---|---|---|---|---|---|
| 1st place, gold medalist(s) | Italy (ITA-1) | Eugenio Monti; Luciano De Paolis | 70.13 | 70.72 | 70.64 | 70.05 | 4:41.54 |
| 2nd place, silver medalist(s) | West Germany (FRG-1) | Horst Floth; Pepi Bader | 70.76 | 70.43 | 70.20 | 70.15 | 4:41.54 |
| 3rd place, bronze medalist(s) | Romania (ROU-1) | Ion Panţuru; Nicolae Neagoe | 70.20 | 71.62 | 71.31 | 71.33 | 4:44.46 |
| 4 | Austria (AUT-1) | Erwin Thaler; Reinhold Durnthaler | 71.27 | 71.26 | 70.72 | 71.88 | 4:45.13 |
| 5 | Great Britain (GBR-1) | Tony Nash; Robin Dixon | 70.57 | 71.60 | 71.77 | 71.22 | 4:45.16 |
| 6 | United States (USA-1) | Paul Lamey; Robert Huscher | 71.30 | 71.54 | 71.04 | 72.15 | 4:46.03 |
| 7 | West Germany (FRG-2) | Wolfgang Zimmerer; Peter Utzschneider | 72.36 | 71.94 | 70.77 | 71.33 | 4:46.40 |
| 8 | Austria (AUT-2) | Max Kaltenberger; Fritz Dinkhauser | 71.34 | 72.15 | 71.00 | 72.14 | 4:46.63 |
| 9 | Switzerland (SUI-1) | Jean Wicki; Hans Candrian | 70.60 | 71.72 | 72.01 | 72.65 | 4:46.98 |
| 10 | Switzerland (SUI-2) | René Stadler; Max Forster | 71.60 | 72.74 | 72.36 | 72.46 | 4:49.16 |
| 11 | United States (USA-2) | Howard Clifton; Michael Luce | 72.10 | 72.18 | 71.88 | 73.15 | 4:49.31 |
| 12 | Italy (ITA-2) | Rinaldo Ruatti; Sergio Mocellini | 71.80 | 72.29 | 73.27 | 72.95 | 4:50.31 |
| 13 | Spain (ESP-2) | José María Palomo; José Manuel Pérez | 71.97 | 72.60 | 74.34 | 72.25 | 4:51.16 |
| 14 | Sweden (SWE-1) | Rolf Höglund; Börje Hedblom | 72.77 | 73.17 | 72.62 | 72.63 | 4:51.19 |
| 15 | Great Britain (GBR-2) | John Blockey; Mike Freeman | 72.06 | 72.25 | 73.79 | 73.17 | 4:51.27 |
| 16 | France (FRA-1) | Bertrand Croset; Henri Sirvain | 72.36 | 72.79 | 72.35 | 73.78 | 4:51.28 |
| 17 | Spain (ESP-1) | Eugenio Baturone; Maximiliano Jones | 72.76 | 74.30 | 72.81 | 71.67 | 4:51.54 |
| 18 | Sweden (SWE-2) | Carl-Erik Eriksson; Eric Wennerberg | 72.75 | 72.69 | 72.84 | 73.41 | 4:51.69 |
| 19 | Canada (CAN-1) | Purvis McDougall; Bob Storey | 73.89 | 72.80 | 73.68 | 73.73 | 4:54.10 |
| 20 | France (FRA-2) | Gérard Christaud-Pipola; Jacques Christaud-Pipola | 71.24 | 94.47 | 72.49 | 73.47 | 5:11.67 |
| – | Romania (ROU-2) | Romeo Nedelcu; Gheorghe Maftei | ? | ? | ? | DNF | – |
| – | Canada (CAN-2) | Hans Gehrig; Harry Goetschi | DQ | – | – | – | – |
