= Austria at the 1968 Winter Olympics =

- IOC code: AUT
- NOC: Austrian Olympic Committee
- Website: www.olympia.at (in German)

in Grenoble
- Competitors: 76 (63 men, 13 women) in 10 sports
- Flag bearer: Emmerich Danzer (figure skating)
- Medals Ranked 5th: Gold 3 Silver 4 Bronze 4 Total 11

Winter Olympics appearances (overview)
- 1924; 1928; 1932; 1936; 1948; 1952; 1956; 1960; 1964; 1968; 1972; 1976; 1980; 1984; 1988; 1992; 1994; 1998; 2002; 2006; 2010; 2014; 2018; 2022; 2026

Austria competed at the 1968 Winter Olympics in Grenoble, France.

== Medalists ==
Medal	Name	Sport	Event
Gold	Olga Pall	Alpine skiing	Women's downhill
Gold	Wolfgang Schwarz	Figure skating	Men's singles
Gold	Manfred Schmid	Luge	Men's individual
Silver	Herbert Huber	Alpine skiing	Men's slalom
Silver	Erwin Thaler; Reinhold Durnthaler; Herbert Gruber; Josef Eder	Bobsleigh	Four-man
Silver	Manfred Schmid; Ewald Walch	Luge	Men's doubles
Silver	Reinhold Bachler	Ski jumping	Men's normal hill
Bronze	Heini Meßner	Alpine skiing	Men's giant slalom
Bronze	Alfred Matt	Alpine skiing	Men's slalom
Bronze	Christl Haas	Alpine skiing	Women's downhill
Bronze	Baldur Preiml	Ski jumping	Men's normal hill

== Alpine skiing ==
Men

Athlete	Event	Race 1		Race 2		Total	
Athlete	Event	Time	Rank	Time	Rank	Time	Rank
Egon Zimmermann	Downhill					2:02.55	13
Gerhard Nenning	Downhill					2:02.31	9
Karl Schranz	Downhill					2:01.89	5
Heini Meßner	Downhill					2:01.93	4
Werner Bleiner	Giant Slalom	1:46.56	16	DSQ	–	DSQ	–
Gerhard Nenning	Giant Slalom	1:46.47	15	1:47.14	4	3:33.61	8
Karl Schranz	Giant Slalom	1:45.28	6	1:47.80	8	3:33.08	6
Heini Meßner	Giant Slalom	1:45.16	5	1:46.67	3	3:31.83	3rd place, bronze medalist(s)

Men's slalom

Athlete	Heat 1		Heat 2		Final					
Athlete	Time	Rank	Time	Rank	Time 1	Rank	Time 2	Rank	Total	Rank
Karl Schranz	52.56	1 QF	–	–	DSQ	–	49.53	1	DSQ	–
Heini Meßner	51.76	1 QF	–	–	52.32	27	51.83	14	1:44.15	14
Alfred Matt	50.99	1 QF	–	–	49.68	2	50.41	5	1:40.09	3rd place, bronze medalist(s)
Herbert Huber	53.04	1 QF	–	–	50.06	13	49.76	2	1:39.82	2nd place, silver medalist(s)

Women

Athlete	Event	Race 1		Race 2		Total	
Athlete	Event	Time	Rank	Time	Rank	Time	Rank
Gertrud Gabl	Downhill					1:43.97	12
Brigitte Seiwald	Downhill					1:41.82	4
Christl Haas	Downhill					1:41.41	3rd place, bronze medalist(s)
Olga Pall	Downhill					1:40.87	1st place, gold medalist(s)
Lisi Pall	Giant Slalom					2:00.91	27
Brigitte Seiwald	Giant Slalom					1:57.26	11
Gertrud Gabl	Giant Slalom					1:56.85	9
Olga Pall	Giant Slalom					1:55.61	5
Gertrud Gabl	Slalom	DNF	–	–	–	DNF	–
Olga Pall	Slalom	43.59	16	47.52	9	1:31.11	9
Bernadette Rauter	Slalom	43.34	14	47.10	8	1:30.44	8
Brigitte Seiwald	Slalom	41.52	4	59.77	30	1:41.29	24

== Biathlon ==
Men

Event	Athlete	Time	Penalties	Adjusted time ^{1}	Rank
20 km	Franz Vetter	1'16:25.0	20	1'36:25.0	56
20 km	Adolf Scherwitzl	1'30:21.7	4	1'34:21.7	50
20 km	Horst Schneider	1'24:49.6	9	1'33:49.6	47
20 km	Paul Ernst	1'25:47.9	6	1'31:47.9	40

^{1} One minute added per close miss (a hit in the outer ring), two minutes added per complete miss.

Men's 4 x 7.5 km relay

Athletes	Race		
Athletes	Misses ^{2}	Time	Rank
Paul Ernst; Adolf Scherwitzl; Horst Schneider; Franz Vetter	10	2'33:47.1	11

^{2} A penalty loop of 200 metres had to be skied per missed target.

== Bobsleigh ==
Sled	Athletes	Event	Run 1		Run 2		Run 3		Run 4		Total	
Sled	Athletes	Event	Time	Rank	Time	Rank	Time	Rank	Time	Rank	Time	Rank
AUT-1	Erwin Thaler; Reinhold Durnthaler	Two-man	1:11.27	7	1:11.26	3	1:10.72	3	1:11.88	7	4:45.13	4
AUT-2	Max Kaltenberger; Fritz Dinkhauser	Two-man	1:11.34	9	1:12.15	9	1:11.00	5	1:12.14	8	4:46.63	8

Sled	Athletes	Event	Run 1		Run 2		Total	
Sled	Athletes	Event	Time	Rank	Time	Rank	Time	Rank
AUT-1	Erwin Thaler; Reinhold Durnthaler; Herbert Gruber; Josef Eder	Four-man	1:10.08	2	1:07.40	2	2:17.48	2nd place, silver medalist(s)
AUT-2	Manfred Hofer; Hans Ritzl; Fritz Dinkhauser; Karl Pichler	Four-man	1:10.90	9	1:09.12	15	2:20.02	13

== Cross-country skiing ==
Men

Event	Athlete	Race	
Event	Athlete	Time	Rank
15 km	Walter Failer	54:12.5	51
15 km	Ernst Pühringer	53:23.0	47
15 km	Heinrich Wallner	52:53.6	42
15 km	Andreas Janc	51:29.8	31
30 km	Hansjörg Farbmacher	1'49:43.3	50
30 km	Franz Vetter	1'45:11.2	40
30 km	Ernst Pühringer	1'44:51.0	38
50 km	Franz Vetter	2'43:51.1	34
50 km	Andreas Janc	2'32:32.2	13

Men's 4 × 10 km relay

Athletes	Race	
Athletes	Time	Rank
Heinrich Wallner; Franz Vetter; Ernst Pühringer; Andreas Janc	2'22:29.4	13

== Figure skating ==
Men

Athlete	CF	FS	Points	Places	Rank
Günter Anderl	20	23	1574,7	193	23
Emmerich Danzer	4	1	1873.0	29	4
Wolfgang Schwarz	1	2	1904.1	13	1st place, gold medalist(s)

Women

Athlete	CF	FS	Points	Places	Rank
Elisabeth Nestler	26	21	1562.6	2089	23
Elisabeth Mikula	17	19	1612.5	164	18
Beatrix Schuba	3	12	1773.2	51	5

== Ice hockey ==
=== Consolation round ===
Teams in this group play for 9th-14th places. Austria entered in this round, from the start they did not play for the medals.

Rank	Team	Pld	W	L	T	GF	GA	Pts
9	Yugoslavia	5	5	0	0	33	9	10
10	Japan	5	4	1	0	27	12	8
11	Norway	5	3	2	0	15	15	6
12	Romania	5	2	3	0	22	23	4
13	Austria	5	1	4	0	12	27	2
14	France	5	0	5	0	9	32	0

Romania – Austria 3:2 (2:1, 1:1, 0:0)
Goalscorers: Fagarasi, Calamar, Mois – Schupp, Samonig.

(Socialist Federal Republic of Yugoslavia) Yugoslavia – Austria 6:0 (2:0, 2:0, 2:0)
Goalscorers: Ivo Jan 3, Roman Smolej, Tisler, Klinar.

France – Austria 2:5 (0:1, 2:3, 0:1)
Goalscorers: Faucomprez, Caux – Puschnig 2, Kirchbaumer, St. John, Schupp.

Norway – Austria 5:4 (3:1, 2:1, 0:2)
Goalscorers: Dalsören 2, Bjölbak, Olsen, Hansen – Schupp 2, Weingärtner, St. John.

Japan – Austria 11:1 (1:0, 6:0, 4:1)
Goalscorers: Itoh 2, Okajima 2, Hikigi 2, Araki, Kudo, Takashima, Toriyabe, Iwamoto – Puschnig.

=== Contestants ===
13. AUSTRIA
Goaltenders: Franz Schilcher, Karl Pregl
Defence: Gerd Schager, Gerhard Felfernig, Josef Mössmer, Hermann Erhard, Gerhard Hausner
Forwards: Dieter Kalt, Adelbert St. John, Josef Puschnig, Josef Schwitzer, Heinz Schupp, Walter König, Heinz Knoflach, Klaus Weingartner, Klaus Kirchbaumer, Günter Burkhart, Paul Samonig

== Luge ==
Men

Athlete	Run 1		Run 2		Run 3		Total	
Athlete	Time	Rank	Time	Rank	Time	Rank	Time	Rank
Peter Kretauer	DSQ	–	–	–	–	–	DSQ	–
Helmut Thaler	58.42	14	59.03	16	58.60	14	2:56.05	14
Josef Feistmantl	57.78	6	58.06	5	57.73	4	2:53.27	5
Manfred Schmid	57.16	1	57.73	3	57.59	2	2:52.48	1st place, gold medalist(s)

(Men's) Doubles

Athletes	Run 1		Run 2		Total	
Athletes	Time	Rank	Time	Rank	Time	Rank
Manfred Schmid; Ewald Walch	48.16	2	48.18	2	1:36.34	2nd place, silver medalist(s)
Josef Feistmantl; Wilhelm Bichl	48.81	6	49.30	10	1:38.11	7

Women

Athlete	Run 1		Run 2		Run 3		Total	
Athlete	Time	Rank	Time	Rank	Time	Rank	Time	Rank
Elfriede Wäger	51.93	18	50.44	12	52.04	17	2:34.41	15
Marlene Korthals	49.72	9	50.31	8	51.30	12	2:31.33	10
Leni Thurner	49.64	6	50.15	7	50.71	7	2:30.50	9

== Nordic combined ==
Events:

- normal hill ski jumping (Three jumps, best two counted and shown here.)
- 15 km cross-country skiing

Athlete	Event	Ski Jumping				Cross-country			Total	
Athlete	Event	Distance 1	Distance 2	Points	Rank	Time	Points	Rank	Points	Rank
Helmut Voggenberger	Individual	67.5	66.0	181.9	32	54:57.2	160.07	37	341.97	35
Waldemar Heigenhauser	Individual	69.0	68.5	197.2	21	55:00.4	159.49	38	356.69	34
Ulli Öhlböck	Individual	64.0	64.0	168.8	36	52:23.9	189.20	23	358.00	32

== Ski jumping ==
Athlete	Event	Jump 1		Jump 2		Total	
Athlete	Event	Distance	Points	Distance	Points	Points	Rank
Sepp Lichtenegger	Normal hill	72.5	98.3	70.0	94.8	193.1	29
Max Golser	Normal hill	74.0	102.7	65.0	83.3	186.0	36
Reinhold Bachler	Normal hill	77.5	107.8	76.0	106.4	214.2	2nd place, silver medalist(s)
Baldur Preiml	Normal hill	80.0	113.8	72.5	98.8	212.6	3rd place, bronze medalist(s)
Baldur Preiml	Large hill	80.5	66.1	87.0	86.2	152.3	48
Sepp Lichtenegger	Large hill	91.0	90.8	91.0	93.8	184.6	28
Max Golser	Large hill	95.0	98.9	91.5	91.5	190.4	22
Reinhold Bachler	Large hill	98.5	107.3	95.0	103.4	210.7	6

== Speed skating ==
Men

Event	Athlete	Race	
Event	Athlete	Time	Rank
500 m	Otmar Braunecker	42.1	26
1500 m	Erich Korbel	2:15.7	44
1500 m	Hermann Strutz	2:14.8	40
1500 m	Otmar Braunecker	2:14.4	39
5000 m	Erich Korbel	8:20.8	37
5000 m	Hermann Strutz	7:53.3	16
10,000 m	Hermann Strutz	16:24.9	17
