= Bobsleigh at the 1968 Winter Olympics – Four-man =

Four-man at the X Olympic Winter Games
- Venue: L'Alpe d'Huez
- Dates: 16 February 1968
- Competitors: 76 from 11 nations
- Winning time: 2:17.39

Medalists
1st place, gold medalist(s)		Italy; Eugenio Monti, Luciano De Paolis, Roberto Zandonella, Mario Armano
2nd place, silver medalist(s)		Austria; Erwin Thaler, Reinhold Durnthaler, Herbert Gruber, Josef Eder
3rd place, bronze medalist(s)		Switzerland; Jean Wicki, Hans Candrian, Willi Hofmann, Walter Graf

The Four-man bobsleigh competition at the 1968 Winter Olympics in Grenoble was held on 16 February, at L'Alpe d'Huez. A sudden thaw in the ice on the track limited the competition to two runs.

== Results ==
Rank	Country	Athletes	Run 1	Run 2	Total
1st place, gold medalist(s)	Italy (ITA-1)	Eugenio Monti; Luciano De Paolis; Roberto Zandonella; Mario Armano	69.84	67.55	2:17.39
2nd place, silver medalist(s)	Austria (AUT-1)	Erwin Thaler; Reinhold Durnthaler; Herbert Gruber; Josef Eder	70.08	67.40	2:17.48
3rd place, bronze medalist(s)	Switzerland (SUI-1)	Jean Wicki; Hans Candrian; Willi Hofmann; Walter Graf	70.65	67.39	2:18.04
4	Romania	Ion Panţuru; Petre Hristovici; Gheorghe Maftei; Nicolae Neagoe	70.59	67.55	2:18.14
5	West Germany (FRG-1)	Horst Floth; Willi Schäfer; Frank Lange; Pepi Bader	70.49	67.84	2:18.33
6	Italy (ITA-2)	Gianfranco Gaspari; Giuseppe Rescigno; Andrea Clemente; Leonardo Cavallini	70.24	68.12	2:18.36
7	France (FRA-1)	Francis Luiggi; André Patey; Gérard Monrazel; Maurice Grether	70.65	68.19	2:18.84
8	Great Britain (GBR-1)	Tony Nash; Guy Renwick; Robin Widdows; Robin Dixon	70.45	68.39	2:18.84
9	West Germany (FRG-2)	Wolfgang Zimmerer; Stefan Gaisreiter; Hans Baumann; Peter Utzschneider	71.12	68.35	2:19.47
10	United States (USA-2)	Boris Said, Jr. David Dunn; Robert Crowley; Phil Duprey	71.08	68.48	2:19.56
11	France (FRA-2)	Bertrand Croset; Claude Roussel; Louis Courtois; Henri Sirvain	71.11	68.61	2:19.72
12	Switzerland (SUI-2)	René Stadler; Hansruedi Müller; Robert Zimmermann; Ernst Schmidt	71.02	68.81	2:19.83
13	Austria (AUT-2)	Manfred Hofer; Hans Ritzl; Fritz Dinkhauser; Karl Pichler	70.90	69.12	2:20.02
14	Great Britain (GBR-2)	John Blockey; John Brown; Tim Thorn; Mike Freeman	71.52	68.67	2:20.19
15	United States (USA-1)	Bill Hickey; Howard Clifton; Michael Luce; Paul Savage	71.45	68.92	2:20.37
16	Sweden	Rolf Höglund; Hans Hallén; Sven Martinsson; Börje Hedblom	72.20	69.90	2:22.10
17	Canada	Purvis McDougall; Bob Storey; Michael Young; Andrew Faulds	72.61	70.21	2:22.82
18	Spain (ESP-2)	Víctor Palomo; Maximiliano Jones; José Clot; Eugenio Baturone	72.86	70.32	2:23.18
19	Spain (ESP-1)	Guillermo Rosal; Néstor Alonso; José Manuel Pérez; Antonio Marín	72.90	71.42	2:24.32
