= Italy at the 1968 Winter Olympics =

- IOC code: ITA
- NOC: Italian National Olympic Committee
- Website: www.coni.it (in Italian)

in Grenoble
- Competitors: 52 (44 men, 8 women) in 8 sports
- Flag bearer: Clotilde Fasolis
- Medals Ranked 4th: Gold 4 Silver 0 Bronze 0 Total 4

Winter Olympics appearances (overview)
- 1924; 1928; 1932; 1936; 1948; 1952; 1956; 1960; 1964; 1968; 1972; 1976; 1980; 1984; 1988; 1992; 1994; 1998; 2002; 2006; 2010; 2014; 2018; 2022; 2026

Italy competed at the 1968 Winter Olympics in Grenoble, France.

== Medalists ==
Medal	Name	Sport	Event
Gold	Eugenio Monti; Luciano De Paolis	Bobsleigh	Two-man
Gold	Eugenio Monti; Luciano De Paolis; Roberto Zandonella; Mario Armano	Bobsleigh	Four-man
Gold	Franco Nones	Cross-country skiing	Men's 30 km
Gold	Erika Lechner	Luge	Women's individual

== Alpine skiing ==
Men

Athlete	Event	Race 1		Race 2		Total	
Athlete	Event	Time	Rank	Time	Rank	Time	Rank
Renato Valentini	Downhill					2:05.61	28
Teresio Vachet	Downhill					2:04.90	22
Gerardo Mussner	Downhill					2:02.50	11
Ivo Mahlknecht	Downhill					2:02.00	6
Renato Valentini	Giant Slalom	1:50.03	35	DNF	–	DNF	–
Ivo Mahlknecht	Giant Slalom	1:49.04	31	1:51.04	23	3:40.08	26
Gerardo Mussner	Giant Slalom	1:47.27	20	1:49.93	16	3:37.20	17
Bruno Piazzalunga	Giant Slalom	1:45.95	9	1:48.57	10	3:34.52	11

Men's slalom

Athlete	Heat 1		Heat 2		Final					
Athlete	Time	Rank	Time	Rank	Time 1	Rank	Time 2	Rank	Total	Rank
Bruno Piazzalunga	52.11	3	DNF	–	did not advance					
Gerardo Mussner	54.60	4	55.55	2	did not advance					
Carlo Senoner	54.18	2 QF	–	–	51.63	20	DNF	–	DNF	–
Ivo Mahlknecht	52.82	2 QF	–	–	52.22	26	53.03	20	1:45.25	19

Women

Athlete	Event	Race 1		Race 2		Total	
Athlete	Event	Time	Rank	Time	Rank	Time	Rank
Lotte Nogler	Downhill					DNF	–
Glorianda Cipolla	Downhill					1:49.02	31
Clotilde Fasolis	Downhill					1:48.90	30
Giustina Demetz	Downhill					1:44.22	13
Clotilde Fasolis	Giant Slalom					2:05.20	32
Lotte Nogler	Giant Slalom					2:04.87	31
Glorianda Cipolla	Giant Slalom					2:00.07	23
Giustina Demetz	Giant Slalom					1:57.86	14
Giustina Demetz	Slalom	n/a	?	DNF	–	DNF	–
Clotilde Fasolis	Slalom	46.40	24	54.32	26	1:40.72	22
Lotte Nogler	Slalom	46.03	22	52.30	21	1:38.33	20
Glorianda Cipolla	Slalom	43.15	12	46.59	7	1:29.74	7

== Bobsleigh ==
Sled	Athletes	Event	Run 1		Run 2		Run 3		Run 4		Total	
Sled	Athletes	Event	Time	Rank	Time	Rank	Time	Rank	Time	Rank	Time	Rank
ITA-1	Eugenio Monti; Luciano De Paolis	Two-man	1:10.13	1	1:10.72	2	1:10.64	2	1:10.05	1	4:41.54	1st place, gold medalist(s)
ITA-2	Rinaldo Ruatti; Sergio Mocellini	Two-man	1:11.80	11	1:12.29	12	1:13.27	17	1:12.95	14	4:50.31	12

Sled	Athletes	Event	Run 1		Run 2		Total	
Sled	Athletes	Event	Time	Rank	Time	Rank	Time	Rank
ITA-1	Eugenio Monti; Luciano De Paolis; Roberto Zandonella; Mario Armano	Four-man	1:09.84	1	1:07.55	3	2:17.39	1st place, gold medalist(s)
ITA-2	Gianfranco Gaspari; Giuseppe Rescigno; Andrea Clemente; Leonardo Cavallini	Four-man	1:10.24	3	1:08.12	6	2:18.36	6

== Cross-country skiing ==
Men

Event	Athlete	Race	
Event	Athlete	Time	Rank
15 km	Franco Nones	52:06.8	36
15 km	Franco Manfroi	51:47.7	32
15 km	Giulio Deflorian	50:19.4	15
15 km	Gianfranco Stella	49:59.8	13
30 km	Franco Manfroi	1'41:11.8	25
30 km	Gianfranco Stella	1'40:42.0	23
30 km	Giulio Deflorian	1'37:12.9	5
30 km	Franco Nones	1'35:39.2	1st place, gold medalist(s)
50 km	Elviro Blanc	2'38:12.4	27
50 km	Livio Stuffer	2'37:46.6	26
50 km	Aldo Stella	2'33:17.9	17
50 km	Mario Bacher	2'31:33.8	12

Men's 4 × 10 km relay

Athletes	Race	
Athletes	Time	Rank
Giulio Deflorian; Franco Nones; Palmiro Serafini; Aldo Stella	2'16:32.2	6

== Figure skating ==
Men

Athlete	CF	FS	Points	Places	Rank
Giordano Abbondati	12	18	1690.9	117	14

Women

Athlete	CF	FS	Points	Places	Rank
Rita Trapanese	27	24	1549.2	216.5	25

== Luge ==
Men

Athlete	Run 1		Run 2		Run 3		Total	
Athlete	Time	Rank	Time	Rank	Time	Rank	Time	Rank
Raimondo Prinoth	58.80	17	59.16	19	58.89	18	2:56.85	18
Sigisfredo Mair	58.22	13	59.51	24	58.45	11	2:56.18	16
Giovanni Graber	58.09	11	58.59	12	58.88	17	2:55.56	12
Emilio Lechner	57.94	9	58.63	13	58.53	12	2:55.10	10

(Men's) Doubles

Athletes	Run 1		Run 2		Total	
Athletes	Time	Rank	Time	Rank	Time	Rank
Giovanni Graber; Enrico Graber	49.01	7	49.14	8	1:38.15	8
Ernesto Mair; Sigisfredo Mair	49.10	10	49.57	11	1:38.67	10

Women

Athlete	Run 1		Run 2		Run 3		Total	
Athlete	Time	Rank	Time	Rank	Time	Rank	Time	Rank
Cristina Pabst	DSQ	–	–	–	–	–	DSQ	–
Erica Prugger	1:01.90	21	50.91	14	51.40	14	2:44.21	21
Erika Lechner	48.76	1	49.39	1	50.51	5	2:27.66	1st place, gold medalist(s)

== Nordic combined ==
Events:

- normal hill ski jumping (Three jumps, best two counted and shown here.)
- 15 km cross-country skiing

Athlete	Event	Ski Jumping				Cross-country			Total	
Athlete	Event	Distance 1	Distance 2	Points	Rank	Time	Points	Rank	Points	Rank
Ezio Damolin	Individual	70.0	71.5	206.0	13	49:36.2	223.54	4	429.54	5
Fabio Morandini	Individual	66.0	66.5	181.7	33	50:08.5	216.56	7	398.26	17

== Ski jumping ==
Athlete	Event	Jump 1		Jump 2		Total	
Athlete	Event	Distance	Points	Distance	Points	Points	Rank
Giacomo Aimoni	Normal hill	72.5	97.8	71.5	97.2	195.0	25
Giacomo Aimoni	Large hill	93.0	98.1	92.0	97.2	195.3	16

== Speed skating ==
Men

Event	Athlete	Race	
Event	Athlete	Time	Rank
500 m	Elio Locatelli	42.1	26
1500 m	Guido Gillarduzzi	2:14.1	38
1500 m	Renato De Riva	2:13.6	34
1500 m	Elio Locatelli	2:13.3	33
1500 m	Giancarlo Gloder	2:13.2	32
5000 m	Renato De Riva	7:58.2	26
5000 m	Guido Gillarduzzi	7:57.4	23
5000 m	Giancarlo Gloder	7:54.5	18
10,000 m	Giancarlo Gloder	17:03.2	24
10,000 m	Renato De Riva	16:39.5	19
