= Bobsleigh at the 1968 Winter Olympics =

Bobsleigh at the X Olympic Winter Games
- Venue: L'Alpe d'Huez
- Dates: 8–11 February 1968
- Competitors: 90 from 11 nations

Bobsleigh at the 1968 Winter Olympics consisted of two events, at L'Alpe d'Huez. The competition took place between 8 and 11 February 1968.

== Medal summary ==
=== Medal table ===
Rank	Nation	Gold	Silver	Bronze	Total
1	Italy	2	0	0	2
2	Austria	0	1	0	1
2	West Germany	0	1	0	1
4	Romania	0	0	1	1
4	Switzerland	0	0	1	1
Totals (5 entries)		2	2	2	6

Five countries won medals in Grenoble, with Italy leading the medal table, winning both gold medals. West Germany won its first medal in bobsleigh, while Romania's bronze medal was its first, and as of 2010, only, Winter Olympic medal.

=== Events ===
Event	Gold		Silver		Bronze	
Two-man	Italy (ITA-1); Eugenio Monti; Luciano de Paolis	4:41.54	West Germany (FRG-1); Horst Floth; Pepi Bader	4:41.54	Romania (ROU-1); Ion Panțuru; Nicolae Neagoe	4:44.46
Four-man	Italy (ITA-1); Eugenio Monti; Luciano de Paolis; Roberto Zandonella; Mario Armano	2:17.39	Austria (AUT-1); Erwin Thaler; Reinhold Durnthaler; Herbert Gruber; Josef Eder	2:17.48	Switzerland (SUI-1); Jean Wicki; Hans Candrian; Willi Hofmann; Walter Graf	2:18.04

There was a tie for first place in the two-man event. Despite initially ruling that both teams would be awarded the gold medals, the judges awarded the sole gold to the Italian team based on their fastest single heat time.

== Participating NOCs ==
Eleven nations participated in bobsleigh at the 1968 Games. West Germany made their Olympic bobsleigh debut, in their first games sending athletes separate from a unified German team.

- Austria (9)
- Canada (6)
- Spain (9)
- France (10)
- West Germany (8)
- Great Britain (8)
- Italy (10)
- Romania (5)
- Switzerland (9)
- Sweden (6)
- United States (10)
