= Switzerland at the 1968 Winter Olympics =

- IOC code: SUI
- NOC: Swiss Olympic Association
- Website: www.swissolympic.ch (in German and French)

in Grenoble
- Competitors: 34 (29 men, 5 women) in 7 sports
- Flag bearer: Alois Kälin (Nordic combined)
- Medals Ranked 14th: Gold 0 Silver 2 Bronze 4 Total 6

Winter Olympics appearances (overview)
- 1924; 1928; 1932; 1936; 1948; 1952; 1956; 1960; 1964; 1968; 1972; 1976; 1980; 1984; 1988; 1992; 1994; 1998; 2002; 2006; 2010; 2014; 2018; 2022; 2026

Switzerland competed at the 1968 Winter Olympics in Grenoble, France.

== Medalists ==
Medal	Name	Sport	Event
Silver	Willy Favre	Alpine skiing	Men's giant slalom
Silver	Alois Kälin	Nordic combined	Men's individual
Bronze	Jean-Daniel Dätwyler	Alpine skiing	Men's downhill
Bronze	Fernande Bochatay	Alpine skiing	Women's giant slalom
Bronze	Jean Wicki; Hans Candrian; Willi Hofmann; Walter Graf	Bobsleigh	Four-man
Bronze	Josef Haas	Cross-country skiing	Men's 50 km

== Alpine skiing ==
Men

Athlete	Event	Race 1		Race 2		Total	
Athlete	Event	Time	Rank	Time	Rank	Time	Rank
Dumeng Giovanoli	Downhill					2:02.98	16
Jos Minsch	Downhill					2:02.76	14
Edy Bruggmann	Downhill					2:02.36	10
Jean-Daniel Dätwyler	Downhill					2:00.32	3rd place, bronze medalist(s)
Stefan Kälin	Giant Slalom	1:48.98	29	1:51.44	31	3:40.42	28
Dumeng Giovanoli	Giant Slalom	1:46.13	11	1:47.42	6	3:33.55	7
Edy Bruggmann	Giant Slalom	1:46.00	10	1:48.91	11	3:34.91	12
Willy Favre	Giant Slalom	1:43.94	2	1:47.56	7	3:31.50	2nd place, silver medalist(s)

Men's slalom

Athlete	Heat 1		Heat 2		Final					
Athlete	Time	Rank	Time	Rank	Time 1	Rank	Time 2	Rank	Total	Rank
Andreas Sprecher	54.78	3	52.99	1 QF	51.91	24	DSQ	–	DSQ	–
Willy Favre	53.65	1 QF	–	–	DSQ	–	–	–	DSQ	–
Peter Frei	55.66	2 QF	–	–	50.04	12	51.94	15	1:41.98	10
Dumeng Giovanoli	51.14	1 QF	–	–	49.89	6	50.33	3	1:40.22	4

Women

Athlete	Event	Race 1		Race 2		Total	
Athlete	Event	Time	Rank	Time	Rank	Time	Rank
Vreni Inäbnit	Downhill					1:45.16	18
Madeleine Wuilloud	Downhill					1:44.49	16
Annerösli Zryd	Downhill					1:43.76	11
Fernande Bochatay	Downhill					1:42.87	7
Madeleine Wuilloud	Giant Slalom					DNF	–
Vreni Inäbnit	Giant Slalom					1:58.50	19
Annerösli Zryd	Giant Slalom					1:57.60	13
Fernande Bochatay	Giant Slalom					1:54.74	3rd place, bronze medalist(s)
Fernande Bochatay	Slalom	DSQ	–	–	–	DSQ	–
Vreni Inäbnit	Slalom	45.45	21	49.73	16	1:35.18	17
Madeleine Wuilloud	Slalom	44.86	19	48.41	12	1:33.27	13
Annerösli Zryd	Slalom	42.97	11	48.44	13	1:31.41	11

== Bobsleigh ==
Sled	Athletes	Event	Run 1		Run 2		Run 3		Run 4		Total	
Sled	Athletes	Event	Time	Rank	Time	Rank	Time	Rank	Time	Rank	Time	Rank
SUI-1	Jean Wicki; Hans Candrian	Two-man	1:10.60	4	1:11.72	7	1:12.01	10	1:12.65	13	4:46.98	9
SUI-2	René Stadler; Max Forster	Two-man	1:11.60	10	1:12.74	15	1:12.36	12	1:12.46	11	4:49.16	10

Sled	Athletes	Event	Run 1		Run 2		Total	
Sled	Athletes	Event	Time	Rank	Time	Rank	Time	Rank
SUI-1	Jean Wicki; Hans Candrian; Willi Hofmann; Walter Graf	Four-man	1:10.65	7	1:07.39	1	2:18.04	3rd place, bronze medalist(s)
SUI-2	René Stadler; Hansruedi Müller; Robert Zimmermann; Ernst Schmidt	Four-man	1:11.02	10	1:08.81	13	2:19.83	12

== Cross-country skiing ==
Men

Event	Athlete	Race	
Event	Athlete	Time	Rank
15 km	Konrad Hischier	52:06.4	35
15 km	Albert Giger	51:26.6	30
15 km	Flury Koch	50:37.2	19
15 km	Josef Haas	50:34.8	18
30 km	Fritz Stuessi	1'43:57.8	35
30 km	Florian Koch	1'43:06.9	32
30 km	Konrad Hischier	1'42:26.1	30
30 km	Denis Mast	1'41:58.8	28
50 km	Denis Mast	DNF	–
50 km	Franz Kälin	2'44:29.7	37
50 km	Alois Kälin	2'36:40.8	23
50 km	Josef Haas	2'29:14.8	3rd place, bronze medalist(s)

Men's 4 × 10 km relay

Athletes	Race	
Athletes	Time	Rank
Konrad Hischier; Josef Haas; Flury Koch; Alois Kälin	2'15:32.4	5

== Figure skating ==
Women

Athlete	CF	FS	Points	Places	Rank
Charlotte Walter	21	26	1571.5	202.5	22

== Nordic combined ==
Events:

- normal hill ski jumping (Three jumps, best two counted and shown here.)
- 15 km cross-country skiing

Athlete	Event	Ski Jumping				Cross-country			Total	
Athlete	Event	Distance 1	Distance 2	Points	Rank	Time	Points	Rank	Points	Rank
Alois Kälin	Individual	71.0	69.5	193.2	24	47:21.5	254.79	1	447.99	2nd place, silver medalist(s)

== Ski jumping ==
Athlete	Event	Jump 1		Jump 2		Total	
Athlete	Event	Distance	Points	Distance	Points	Points	Rank
Josef Zehnder	Normal hill	73.5	65.4	67.5 (fall)	88.8	154.2	52
Josef Zehnder	Large hill	84.0	81.5	79.5	71.7	153.2	47

== Speed skating ==
Men

Event	Athlete	Race	
Event	Athlete	Time	Rank
500 m	Hansruedi Widmer	43.7	44
500 m	Ruedi Uster	43.6	43
1500 m	Franz Krienbühl	2:16.3	48
1500 m	Hansruedi Widmer	2:16.1	47
5000 m	Ruedi Uster	8:12.2	35
5000 m	Franz Krienbühl	8:08.9	34
