= José Pérez =

José Pérez or Jose Perez may refer to:

== Sportspeople ==
=== Association football ===
- José Pérez (Uruguayan footballer) (1897–1920), Uruguayan footballer
- José Pérez (Argentine footballer) (1912–1986), Argentine football player and manager
- José Ricardo Pérez (born 1963), Colombian football defender
- José Andrés Pérez (born 1972), Mexican football manager and former player
- José Manuel Pérez (footballer) (born 1985), Spanish footballer
- José Pérez (Chilean footballer) (born 1985), Chilean footballer
- José Pérez (Cuban footballer), (born 1999), Cuban footballer

=== Combat sports ===
- José Luis Pérez (wrestler) (1925–1963), Mexican wrestler
- José Pérez (pentathlete) (born 1928), Mexican Olympic modern pentathlete and fencer
- José Miguel Pérez (fencer) (born 1938), Puerto Rican fencer
- José Pérez (fencer) (born 1958), Spanish Olympic fencer
- José Pérez (Venezuelan boxer) (born 1964), former Venezuelan boxer
- José Pérez (judoka) (born 1965), Puerto Rican judoka
- José Pérez Reyes (born 1975), boxer from the Dominican Republic

=== Other sports ===
- Jose Perez (American football) (born 1985), American football player and former baseball player
- José Pérez (baseball) (1898–?), Cuban baseball player
- José Pérez (equestrian), Mexican Olympic equestrian
- José Pérez (hurdler) (born 1971), Cuban hurdler
- José Pérez (sailor) (born 1961), Olympic sailor
- José Pérez (sport shooter) (born 1957), Spanish sports shooter
- José Pérez (weightlifter) (born 1945), Dominican Republic Olympic weightlifter
- José Pérez Colmenares (1914–1944), Venezuelan baseball pioneer
- José Pérez Francés (born 1936), Spanish road racing cyclist
- José Pérez Llácer (1927–2006), Spanish racing cyclist
- José Luis Pérez (equestrian) (born 1943), Mexican equestrian
- José Manuel Pérez (bobsleigh) (born 1947), Spanish bobsledder
- José Miguel Pérez (triathlete) (born 1986), Spanish triathlete

== Others ==
- Jose P. Perez (1946–2021), Filipino lawyer, associate justice of the Supreme Court
- Jose Perez (actor), (born 1940), American actor
- José Pérez Adán (born 1952), Spanish sociologist
- José Pérez Arriagada (born 1940), Chilean politician
- José Joaquín Pérez (1801–1889), Chilean political figure
- José María Pérez de Urdininea (1784–1865), president of Bolivia
- José Pérez Caldas (1917—2004), Uruguayan Air Force officer and diplomat
- José Pérez Hervás (1880–1946), Spanish writer, lexicographer and translator
- José Pérez Ocaña (1947–1983), Spanish performance artist and painter
- José Pérez Rosa, Puerto Rican senator and politician
- José Rico Pérez (1918–2010), Spanish businessman, chairman of the Spanish football club Hércules CF
- José Pérez de Lama Halcón (died 1985), Spanish architect
- José Pérez Riera, Puerto Rican politician

== See also ==
- Estadio José Alberto Pérez, a multi-use stadium in Valera, Trujillo, Venezuela
- José Antonio Pérez (disambiguation)
- José Luis Pérez (disambiguation)
- José María Pérez (disambiguation)
- José Miguel Pérez (disambiguation)
