= José Manuel Pérez =

José Manuel Pérez may refer to:

- José Manuel Pérez (bobsleigh) (born 1947), Spanish bobsledder
- José Manuel Pérez-Muñoz (born 1978), Spanish composer
- José Manuel Pérez-Aicart (born 1982), Spanish racing driver
- José Manuel Pérez (footballer) (born 1985), Spanish footballer

== See also ==
- José Pérez (disambiguation)
