= Spain at the 1968 Winter Olympics =

- IOC code: ESP (SPA used at these Games)
- NOC: Spanish Olympic Committee
- Website: www.coe.es (in Spanish)

in Grenoble
- Competitors: 20 (men) in 3 sports
- Flag bearer: Aurelio García
- Medals: Gold 0 Silver 0 Bronze 0 Total 0

Winter Olympics appearances (overview)
- 1936; 1948; 1952; 1956; 1960; 1964; 1968; 1972; 1976; 1980; 1984; 1988; 1992; 1994; 1998; 2002; 2006; 2010; 2014; 2018; 2022; 2026

Spain competed at the 1968 Winter Olympics in Grenoble, France.

== Alpine skiing ==
Men

Athlete	Event	Race 1		Race 2		Total	
Athlete	Event	Time	Rank	Time	Rank	Time	Rank
Antonio Campaña	Downhill					2:11.11	52
Luciano del Cacho	Downhill					2:08.85	39
Francisco Fernández Ochoa	Downhill					2:08.67	38
Aurelio García	Downhill					2:06.84	32
Jorge Rodríguez	Giant Slalom	1:57.92	61	1:59.32	61	3:57.24	59
Antonio Campaña	Giant Slalom	1:53.77	49	1:55.18	43	3:48.95	44
Francisco Fernández Ochoa	Giant Slalom	1:52.57	44	1:53.40	38	3:45.97	38
Aurelio García	Giant Slalom	1:51.57	39	1:56.61	48	3:48.18	42

Men's slalom

Athlete	Heat 1		Heat 2		Final					
Athlete	Time	Rank	Time	Rank	Time 1	Rank	Time 2	Rank	Total	Rank
Secundino Rodríguez	57.30	4	55.44	2	did not advance					
Aurelio García	51.44	1 QF	–	–	DNF	–	–	–	DNF	–
Carlos Adsera	56.04	2 QF	–	–	59.54	42	57.67	27	1:57.21	27
Francisco Fernández Ochoa	53.43	3	56.19	1 QF	53.52	31	54.61	23	1:48.13	23

== Bobsleigh ==
Sled	Athletes	Event	Run 1		Run 2		Run 3		Run 4		Total	
Sled	Athletes	Event	Time	Rank	Time	Rank	Time	Rank	Time	Rank	Time	Rank
ESP-1	Keiran Davis; Maximiliano Jones	Two-man	1:12.76	18	1:14.30	19	1:12.81	15	1:11.67	6	4:51.54	17
ESP-2	José María Palomo; José Manuel Pérez	Two-man	1:11.97	12	1:12.60	13	1:14.34	20	1:12.25	10	4:51.16	13

Sled	Athletes	Event	Run 1		Run 2		Total	
Sled	Athletes	Event	Time	Rank	Time	Rank	Time	Rank
ESP-1	Guillermo Rosal; Néstor Alonso; José Manuel Pérez; Antonio Marín	Four-man	1:12.90	19	1:11.42	19	2:24.32	19
ESP-2	Víctor Palomo; Maximiliano Jones; José Clot; Keiran Davis	Four-man	1:12.86	18	1:10.32	18	2:23.18	18

== Luge ==
Men

Athlete	Run 1		Run 2		Run 3		Total	
Athlete	Time	Rank	Time	Rank	Time	Rank	Time	Rank
Luis Omedes	1:14.43	46	1:04.89	45	1:05.82	47	3:25.14	45
Jorge Monjo	1:05.18	45	1:03.35	42	1:15.12	46	3:13.65	43
Jorge Roura	1:04.01	44	1:05.54	46	1:04.42	45	3:13.97	44
Jesús Gatell	1:03.15	42	1:04.38	43	1:04.25	44	3:11.78	42
