= Hansruedi =

Hansruedi is a Swiss masculine given name. Notable people with the name include:

- Hansruedi Beugger (1930–2020), Swiss bobsledder
- Hansruedi Blatter (1936–1971), Swiss footballer
- Hansruedi Bruder (1937–1998), Swiss sprinter
- Hansruedi Engler (1928–2011), Swiss canoeist
- Hansruedi Fässler (born 1949), Swiss footballer
- Hansruedi Führer (born 1937), Swiss footballer
- Hansruedi Glauser (1945–2014), Swiss chess player
- Hansruedi von Gunten (1928–2021), Swiss chemist and mountaineer
- Hansruedi Jost (1934–2016), Swiss hammer thrower
- Hansrüedi Knill (born 1940), Swiss middle-distance runner
- Hansruedi Kunz (born 1945), Swiss decathlete
- Hansruedi Märki (born 1960), Swiss cyclist
- Hansruedi Müller (born 1940), Swiss bobsledder
- Hansruedi Roth (born 1942), Swiss luger
- Hansruedi Schafroth (born 1934), Swiss sports shooter
- Hansruedi Schär (born 1957), Swiss footballer
- Hansruedi Scheller (1931–2007), Swiss rower
- Hansruedi Schneider (1926–2017), Swiss sports shooter
- Hansruedi Süssli (born 1951), Swiss biathlete
- Hansruedi Widmer (born 1944), Swiss speed skater
- Hansruedi Wiedmer (born 1945), Swiss sprinter
