= Maximiliano Jones =

Maximiliano Jones may refer to:

- Maximiliano Cipriano Jones (1877-1944), Equatoguinean planter
- Maximiliano Jones (bobsledder) (born 1944), Spanish bobsledder
