= Ernst Schmidt =

Ernst Schmidt may refer to:

- Ernst Schmidt (communist), German Communist Party activist
- Ernst Schmidt (physician), German physician and member of the SS
- Ernst Schmidt (bobsleigh), Swiss bobsledder
- Ernst Schmidt (politician), German American physician, socialist politician, and classical scholar
- Ernst Heinrich Wilhelm Schmidt, inventor of the Schmidt hammer and Schmidt number
- Ernst Schmidt, character in The Cloverfield Paradox

== See also ==
- Ernest Schmidt, basketball player
- Ernst Johann Schmitz, zoologist and priest
