= Antonio Marín =

Antonio Marín (with diacritic) or Antonio Marin (no diacritic) may refer to:

- Antonio Marín (bobsleigh) (born 1945), Spanish bobsledder
- Antonio Marín Muñoz (born 1970), Spanish writer and historian
- Antonio Marín (footballer, born 1996), Spanish footballer
- Antonio Marin (footballer, born 2001), Croatian footballer
