= Perrenoud =

Perrenoud is a surname. Notable people with the surname include:

- François Perrenoud (born 1949), French speed skater
- Marc Perrenoud (born 1981), Swiss jazz pianist and composer
- Marie-Louise Perrenoud (born 1947), French speed skater
- fr:Philippe Perrenoud (born 1955), Swiss politician
- fr:Philippe Perrenoud (sociologue) (born 1944), Swiss sociologist
