= Morandini =

Morandini is an Italian surname. Notable people with the surname include:

- Fabio Morandini (born 1945), Italian skier
- Francesco Morandini (c. 1544 – 1597), Italian painter
- Giovanni Battista Morandini (born 1937), Vatican diplomat
- Ismael Morandini (1978–2010), Argentine actor
- Jean-Marc Morandini (born 1965), French journalist
- Marcello Morandini (born 1940), Italian designer and architect
- Mickey Morandini (born 1966), American baseball player
- Norma Morandini (born 1948), Argentine politician
