= Armano =

Armano is a surname. Notable people with the surname include:

- Gino Armano (1927–2003), Italian footballer
- Mario Armano (born 1946), Italian bobsledder
