= Demartini =

Demartini or DeMartini is a surname. Notable people with the surname include:

- Joseph F. DeMartini (1927–2019), American watercolor artist
- Nicolás Demartini (born 1999), Argentine footballer
- Patricia Demartini (born 1950), French speed skater
- Warren DeMartini (born 1963), American musician

== See also ==
- De Martini
