= David Dunn (disambiguation) =

David Dunn (born 1979) is an English footballer.

David Dunn may also refer to:

- Dave Dunn (born 1948), Canadian ice hockey player
- Dave Dunn (American football) (born 1965), American football coach
- David Dunn (footballer, born 1981), Scottish footballer
- David Dunn (American football) (born 1972), former American football wide receiver
- David Dunn (bobsleigh) (born 1936), American bobsledder
- David Dunn (Maine politician) (1811–1894), U.S. politician
- David Dunn (Unbreakable), character in the Unbreakable film trilogy
- David B. Dunn (born 1949), American diplomat
- David Dunn (musician) (born 1984), American musician
- David Dunn (Montana politician), American politician, member of the Montana House of Representatives

== See also ==
- David Dunne (disambiguation)
- David Dun, thriller writer
