= Ichihashi =

Ichihashi (written: 市橋) is a Japanese surname. Notable people with the surname include:

- Ari Ichihashi (市橋 有里; born 1977), Japanese long-distance runner
- Tatsuya Ichihashi (市橋 達也; born 1979), Japanese rapist, murderer, and fugitive
- Tokizo Ichihashi (市橋 時蔵; 1909–?), Japanese footballer
- Yamato Ichihashi (1878–1963), Japanese-American academic
- Yoshiyuki Ichihashi (市橋 善行; born 1949), Japanese bobsledder
- Matthew Ichihashi Potts, American theologian and preacher
