= Oquendo =

Oquendo or de Oquendo is a surname of Basque origin and is a Castilianized variant of "Okendo". Notable people with the surname include:

- Adrián Oquendo (born 1990), Cuban rower
- Alexandra Oquendo (born 1984), Puerto Rican volleyball player
- Angel Oquendo, Puerto Rican actor
- Antonio de Oquendo (1577–1640), Spanish admiral
- Carlos Oquendo (born 1987), Colombian cyclist
- Carlos Oquendo de Amat (1905–1936), Peruvian poet
- Constanza Oquendo (born 1988), Venezuelan fashion designer
- Danny Oquendo (born 1987), American football player
- Fres Oquendo (born 1973), Puerto Rican heavyweight boxer
- Ian Oquendo, named used from 2001 to 2003 by American professional baseball player Ian Snell (born 1981)
- Jonathan Oquendo (born 1983), Puerto Rican professional boxer
- José Oquendo (born 1963), Puerto Rican baseball player and coach
- José Alberto Pérez Oquendo, full name of Cuban professional football player José Pérez (Cuban footballer) (born 1999)
- Kario Oquendo (born 2000), American basketball player
- Luis Oquendo (1925–1992), Cuban actor
- Manny Oquendo (1931–2009), Puerto Rican percussionist
- Maria A. Oquendo, American psychiatrist
- Mateo Rosas de Oquendo (ca. 1559–1612), viceregal Peru's earliest satirist
- Miguel de Oquendo (1534–1588), Spanish admiral

== See also ==
- Marquess of Oquendo, a hereditary title in the Spanish peerage
- Oquendo-class destroyer, a class of Spanish Navy destroyers constructed between 1951 and 1970
- Spanish cruiser Almirante Oquendo, a Spanish Navy armored cruiser of the 1890s
