= Pompanin =

Pompanin is an Italian surname. Notable people with the surname include:

- Dino Pompanin (1930–2015), Italian alpine skier
- Rosa Pompanin (born 1984), Italian curler
- Sergio Pompanin (born 1939), Italian bobsledder
