= Tomas Gustafson (disambiguation) =

T[h]omas Gustafs[s]on may refer to:

- Tomas Gustafson (born 1959), Swedish speed skater.
- Tomas Gustafsson (born 1973), aka Tomas Antonelius, Swedish footballer
- Thomas Gustafsson (born 1968), aka Thomas G:son, Swedish composer and musician
- Thomas Gustafsson (bobsleigh) (born 1948), aka Thomas Morghult
- Tom Gustafson (born 1949), American attorney and former Speaker of the Florida House of Representatives
