= José Miguel Pérez =

José Miguel Pérez may refer to:

- José Miguel Pérez (fencer) (born 1938), Puerto Rican fencer
- José Miguel Pérez (triathlete) (born 1986), Spanish triathlete
- José Miguel Pérez (politician) (1896-1936), a co-founder of the Communist Party of Cuba
- José Miguel Pérez García (1957–2024), Spanish academic and politician

See also:

- Miguel José Pérez, full name of Miguel Pérez (wrestler) (1937–2005), Puerto Rican professional wrestler
