= Rescigno =

Rescigno is a surname. Notable people with the surname include:

- Giuseppe Rescigno (born 1934), Italian bobsledder
- Joseph Rescigno (born 1945), American conductor
- Nicola Rescigno (1916–2008), Italian-American conductor
- Xavier Rescigno (1912–2005), American baseball player
