= Hallen =

Hallen may refer to:

- Hallen Court District, Sweden
- Hallen, Gloucestershire, England
- Hallen, Sweden, in Åre Municipality, Jämtland County
- Hallen A.F.C., a football club in Hallen, England
- Hallen (surname), an English surname

== See also ==
- Halen, a municipality in Limburg, Belgium
- Hallein, a town in the Austrian state of Salzburg
- Hallen derrick, a lifting device
