= Paul Savage (bobsleigh) =

American bobsledder (born 1935)

Personal information
- Nationality: American
- Born: May 28, 1935 (age 91) Au Sable Forks, New York, United States

Sport
- Sport: Bobsleigh

Paul Savage (born May 28, 1935) is an American bobsledder. He competed in the four-man event at the 1968 Winter Olympics.
