= Hiroshi Inaba =

Japanese bobsledder (born 1948)

Personal information
- Nationality: Japanese
- Born: 2 March 1948 (age 77); Hokkaido, Japan

Sport
- Sport: Bobsleigh

Hiroshi Inaba (稲葉 博志, Inaba Hiroshi, born 2 March 1948) is a Japanese bobsledder. He competed in the four man event at the 1972 Winter Olympics.
