= Harry Goetschi =

Canadian bobsledder

Personal information
- Nationality: Canadian
- Born: 9 August 1939 (age 85); Zürich, Switzerland

Sport
- Sport: Bobsleigh

Harry Goetschi (born 9 August 1939) is a Canadian bobsledder. He competed in the two-man event at the 1968 Winter Olympics.
