= James Copley (bobsleigh) =

American bobsledder

Personal information
- Nationality: American
- Born: October 18, 1951 (age 74)

Sport
- Sport: Bobsleigh

James Copley (born October 18, 1951) is an American bobsledder. He competed in the four man event at the 1972 Winter Olympics.
