= Allen Hachigian =

American bobsledder

Medal record

Bobsleigh

World Championships
Bronze medal – third place	1969 Lake Placid	Four-man

Allan Hachigian is an American bobsledder who competed from the late 1960s to the early 1980s. He won a bronze medal in the four-man event at the 1969 FIBT World Championships in Lake Placid, New York.
