= De Martini =

De Martini is an Italian surname. Notable people with the surname include:

- Angelo De Martini (1897–1979), Italian cyclist
- Francesco De Martini (1903–1981), Italian military officer
- Frank De Martini (1952–2001), American architect
- Joseph De Martini (1894–1984), American painter
- Susy De Martini (born 1952), Italian politician

== See also ==
- Demartini
