= Willi Schäfer (bobsleigh) =

German bobsledder

Personal information
- Nationality: German
- Born: 29 August 1932 (age 92); Tutzing, Germany

Sport
- Sport: Bobsleigh

Willi Schäfer (born 29 August 1932) is a German bobsledder. He competed in the four-man event at the 1968 Winter Olympics.
