= Walter Gillik =

German bobsledder

Personal information
- Nationality: German
- Born: 29 July 1938 (age 86); Opava, Czechoslovakia

Sport
- Sport: Bobsleigh

Walter Gillik (born 29 July 1938) is a German bobsledder. He competed in the four man event at the 1972 Winter Olympics.
