= David Richardson (bobsleigh) =

Canadian bobsledder

Personal information
- Born: 25 March 1948 (age 78) Montreal, Quebec, Canada

Sport
- Sport: Bobsleigh

David Richardson (born 25 March 1948) is a Canadian bobsledder. He competed in the four man event at the 1972 Winter Olympics.
