= Ken Morris =

American bobsledder

Personal information
- Born: August 19, 1942 (age 83) New York City, United States

Sport
- Sport: Bobsleigh

Ken Morris (born August 19, 1942) is an American bobsledder. He competed in the four man event at the 1972 Winter Olympics.
