= Eugenio Baturone =

Spanish bobsledder (born 1941)

Personal information
- Full name: Eugenio Baturone Ribas
- Born: 23 February 1941 (age 85) Málaga, Spain

Sport
- Sport: Bobsleigh
Medal record
Men's bobsleigh
Representing Spain
European Championships
Silver medal – second place	1970 Cortina d'Ampezzo	Four-man

Eugenio Baturone Ribas (Note: In this Spanish name, the first or paternal surname is Baturone and the second or maternal family name is Ribas.) (born 23 February 1941) is a Spanish bobsledder. He competed in the two-man and the four-man events at the 1968 Winter Olympics.
