= Peter Blakeley (bobsleigh) =

Canadian bobsledder (born 1946)

Personal information
- Born: 8 March 1946 (age 79) Montreal, Quebec, Canada

Sport
- Sport: Bobsleigh

Peter Blakeley (born 8 March 1946) is a Canadian bobsledder. He competed in the four man event at the 1972 Winter Olympics.
