= FIBT World Championships 1970 =

Winter sport competition

1970 World Championships
- Location: St. Moritz, Switzerland

The FIBT World Championships 1970 took place in St. Moritz, Switzerland for the record eleventh time. The Swiss city had hosted the event previously in 1931 (Four-man), 1935 (Four-man), 1937 (Four-man), 1938 (Two-man), 1939 (Two-man), 1947, 1955, 1957, 1959, and 1965.

== Two man bobsleigh ==
Pos	Team	Time
Gold	West Germany (Horst Floth, Pepi Bader)	
Silver	West Germany (Wolfgang Zimmerer, Peter Utzschneider)	
Bronze	Switzerland (Gion Caviezel, Hans Candrian)	

The Swiss earned their first championships medal since 1960.

== Four man bobsleigh ==
Pos	Team	Time
Gold	Italy (Nevio de Zordo, Roberto Zandonella, Mario Armano, Luciano de Paolis)	
Silver	West Germany (Wolfgang Zimmerer, Walter Steinbauer, Pepi Bader, Peter Utzschneider)	
Bronze	Switzerland (René Stadler, Hans Candrian, Max Forster, Peter Schärer)	

== Medal table ==
Rank	Nation	Gold	Silver	Bronze	Total
1	West Germany (FRG)	1	2	0	3
2	Italy (ITA)	1	0	0	1
3	Switzerland (SUI)	0	0	2	2
Totals (3 entries)		2	2	2	6
