= Romeo Nedelcu =

Romanian bobsledder

Personal information
- Nationality: Romanian
- Born: 14 November 1939 (age 85); Bucharest, Romania

Sport
- Sport: Bobsleigh

Romeo Nedelcu (born 14 November 1939) is a Romanian bobsledder. He competed in the two-man event at the 1968 Winter Olympics.
