= FIBT World Championships 1969 =

Winter sport competition

1969 World Championships
- Location: Lake Placid, New York

The FIBT World Championships 1969 took place in Lake Placid, New York, United States for the third time, hosting the event previously in 1949, and 1961. This also marked the first time both events were able to be competed since 1965.

== Two man bobsleigh ==
Pos	Team	Time
Gold	Italy (Nevio De Zordo, Adriano Frassinelli)	
Silver	Romania (Ion Panţuru, Dumitru Focseneanu)	
Bronze	Italy (Gianfranco Gaspari, Mario Armano)	

== Four man bobsleigh ==
Pos	Team	Time
Gold	West Germany (Wolfgang Zimmerer, Peter Utzschneider, Walter Steinbauer, Stefan Gaisreiter)	
Silver	Italy (Gianfranco Gaspari, Sergio Pompanin, Roberto Zandonella, Mario Armano)	
Bronze	United States (Les Fenner, Robert Huscher, Howard Siler, Allen Hachigian)	

== Medal table ==
Rank	Nation	Gold	Silver	Bronze	Total
1	Italy (ITA)	1	1	1	3
2	West Germany (FRG)	1	0	0	1
3	Romania (ROU)	0	1	0	1
4	United States (USA)	0	0	1	1
Totals (4 entries)		2	2	2	6
