= Alan Jones (bobsleigh) =

British bobsledder

Personal information
- Nationality: British
- Born: 25 October 1946 (age 78)

Sport
- Sport: Bobsleigh

Alan Jones (born 25 October 1946) is a British bobsledder. He competed in the four man event at the 1972 Winter Olympics.
