= Frank Lange (bobsleigh) =

German bobsledder (1934–2023)

Personal information
- Nationality: German
- Born: 26 November 1934; Wuppertal, Germany
- Died: 19 January 2023 (aged 88)

Sport
- Sport: Bobsleigh

Frank Lange (26 November 1934 – 19 January 2023) was a German bobsledder. He competed in the four-man event at the 1968 Winter Olympics.
