= Tom Mentzer =

Swedish bobsledder (born 1943)

Personal information
- Full name: Björn Tommy Mentzer
- Nationality: Swedish
- Born: 15 September 1943 (age 81); Stockholm, Sweden

Sport
- Sport: Bobsleigh

Björn Tommy "Tom" Mentzer (born 15 September 1943) is a Swedish bobsledder. He competed in the four man event at the 1972 Winter Olympics.

Mentzer represented Djurgårdens IF.
