= Werner Moser =

Austrian bobsledder

Personal information
- Nationality: Austrian
- Born: 22 December 1950 (age 74)

Sport
- Sport: Bobsleigh

Werner Moser (born 22 December 1950) is an Austrian bobsledder. He competed in the four man event at the 1972 Winter Olympics.
