= Erwin Juon =

Swiss bobsledder (born 1945)

Personal information
- Nationality: Swiss
- Born: 18 August 1945 (age 79)

Sport
- Sport: Bobsleigh

Erwin Juon (born 18 August 1945) is a Swiss bobsledder. He competed in the four man event at the 1972 Winter Olympics.
