= Robert Crowley (bobsleigh) =

American bobsledder

Personal information
- Nationality: American
- Born: July 21, 1942 (age 84) Jay, New York, United States

Sport
- Sport: Bobsleigh

Robert Crowley (born July 21, 1942) is an American bobsledder. He competed in the four-man event at the 1968 Winter Olympics.
