= John Brown (bobsleigh) =

British bobsledder and rugby player (1935–2019)

Personal information
- Full name: Harold John Catleugh Brown
- Nationality: British
- Born: 21 April 1935 London, England
- Died: 30 March 2019 (aged 83)

Sport
- Sport: Bobsleigh; Rugby union
Medal record
Men's bobsleigh
Representing Great Britain
European Championships
Bronze medal – third place	1968 St. Moritz	Four-man

Harold John Catleugh Brown (21 April 1935 – 30 March 2019) was a British bobsledder and rugby player. He competed in the four-man event at the 1968 Winter Olympics.
