= Jim Bridges =

American bobsledder (born 1951)

Personal information
- Born: January 24, 1951 (age 75) St. Louis, Missouri, U.S.

Sport
- Sport: Bobsleigh

Jim Bridges (born January 24, 1951) is an American bobsledder. He competed in the four man event at the 1972 Winter Olympics.
