= Gion Caviezel =

Swiss bobsledder (1936–2004)

Medal record

Bobsleigh

World Championships
Bronze medal – third place	1970 St. Moritz	Two-man

Gion Flurin Caviezel (20 August 1936 – 1 November 2004) was a Swiss bobsledder who competed in the late 1960s and early 1970s.

Born in Samaden, son of Berta Amalia Graf and Jakob Caviezel, a police officer, Gion Caviezel studied as an engineer.

Gion Caviezel had won the Swiss bobsled championships for three times. He won a bronze medal in the two-man event at the 1970 FIBT World Championships in St. Moritz.

Gion Cavieziel died in St. Moritz on 1 November 2004 after a short illness. FIBT president Robert H. Storey mourned him.

== Incident ==
In 1967, Gion Caviezel was arrested after the discovery of the body of a 21-year-old Alsatian woman, Evelyne North, who was his girlfriend; the young woman was stabbed and shot near her home in Molsheim, 26 km (16 mi) west of Strasbourg. Caviezel's business card was found in the woman's house; the police released him soon after because there was no evidence against him.

== Personal life ==
He married Maria Felicitas Frank in May 1973 and had two daughters, Flurina Christina and Barbara.
