= Utz Chwalla =

Austrian bobsledder

Personal information
- Nationality: Austrian
- Born: 22 September 1942 (age 82); Frýdek, Protectorate of Bohemia and Moravia

Sport
- Sport: Bobsleigh

Utz Chwalla (born 22 September 1942) is an Austrian bobsledder. He competed in the four man event at the 1972 Winter Olympics.
