= Hallen (surname) =

Hallen or Hallén is a surname. Notable people with the surname include:

- Andreas Hallén (1846–1925), Swedish composter
- Arvid Hallén (born 1950), Swedish sociologist
- Bob Hallen (born 1975), American footballer
- Christian Hallén-Paulsen (1945–2012), Norwegian luger
- Erik Hallén (1899–1975), Swedish physicist and engineer
- Ernest Hallen (1875–1947), American photographer
- Frederick Hallen (1859–1920), Canadian-American vaudeville entertainer
- Hans Hallén (1935–2013), Swedish bobsledder
- James Hallen (1829–1901), British veterinarian
- Yngve Hallén (born 1968), Norwegian sports executive
