= Yves Bonsang =

French bobsledder

Personal information
- Nationality: French
- Born: 19 May 1950
- Died: 13 January 2000 (aged 49)

Sport
- Sport: Bobsleigh

Yves Bonsang (19 May 1950 – 13 January 2000) was a French bobsledder. He competed in the four man event at the 1972 Winter Olympics.
