= Les Fenner =

American bobsledder

Medal record

Bobsleigh

World Championships
Bronze medal – third place	1969 Lake Placid	Four-man

Les Fenner (born c.1923) is an American bobsledder who competed in the late 1960s. He won a bronze medal in the four-man event at the 1969 FIBT World Championships in Lake Placid, New York.

Fenner was in the US Air Force. He was from Keeseville, New York.
