= Koichi Sugawara =

Japanese bobsledder (born 1950)

Personal information
- Nationality: Japanese
- Born: 8 March 1950 (age 75); Hokkaido, Japan

Sport
- Sport: Bobsleigh

Koichi Sugawara (菅原 貢一, Sugawara Kōichi, born 8 March 1950) is a Japanese bobsledder. He competed in the four man event at the 1972 Winter Olympics.
