= Gilles Morda =

French bobsledder

Personal information
- Nationality: French
- Born: 4 April 1946
- Died: 27 September 2003 (aged 57)

Sport
- Sport: Bobsleigh

Gilles Morda (4 April 1946 – 27 September 2003) was a French bobsledder. He competed in the four man event at the 1972 Winter Olympics.
