= David Dunne =

David Dunne may refer to:

- David Dunne (DJ), British DJ and radio presenter
- David Dunne (swimmer) (born 1955), British former swimmer
- David Dunne (hurler) (born 1995), Irish hurler

== See also ==
- David Dunn (disambiguation)
