= Toshihisa Nagata =

Japanese bobsledder (born 1945)

Personal information
- Nationality: Japanese
- Born: 12 May 1945 (age 79); Hokkaido, Japan

Sport
- Sport: Bobsleigh

Toshihisa Nagata (長田 利久, Nagata Toshihisa, born 12 May 1945) is a Japanese bobsledder. He competed in the four man event at the 1972 Winter Olympics.
