= Erich Korbel =

Austrian speed skater (1941–2023)

Personal information
- Nationality: Austrian
- Born: 7 July 1941; Vienna, Nazi Germany
- Died: 4 January 2023 (aged 81); Gloggnitz, Austria

Sport
- Sport: Speed skating

Erich Korbel (7 July 1941 – 4 January 2023) was an Austrian speed skater. He competed at the 1964 Winter Olympics and the 1968 Winter Olympics.
