= Néstor Alonso =

Spanish bobsledder (born 1941)

Personal information
- Nationality: Spanish
- Born: 25 May 1941 (age 83); Barcelona, Spain

Sport
- Sport: Bobsleigh

Néstor Alonso (born 25 May 1941) is a Spanish bobsledder. He competed in the four-man event at the 1968 Winter Olympics.
