= Franco Manfroi =

Medal record

Men's cross-country skiing

World Championships
Bronze medal – third place	1966 Oslo	4 x 10 km

Franco Manfroi (Forno di Canale 11 June 1939 - Belluno 12 October 2005) was a former Italian cross-country skier who competed in the 1960s. He earned a bronze medal in the 4 x 10 km at the 1966 FIS Nordic World Ski Championships in Oslo. He was an athlete of the G.S. Fiamme Oro.

== Further notable results ==
- 1963
  - 2nd, Italian men's championships of cross-country skiing, 50 km
- 1964:
  - 3rd, Italian men's championships of cross-country skiing, 30 km
  - 3rd, Italian men's championships of cross-country skiing, 15 km
- 1965:
  - 3rd, Italian men's championships of cross-country skiing, 50 km
  - 3rd, Italian men's championships of cross-country skiing, 30 km
- 1966:
  - 2nd, Italian men's championships of cross-country skiing, 30 km
  - 3rd, Italian men's championships of cross-country skiing, 50 km
  - 3rd, Italian men's championships of cross-country skiing, 15 km
- 1969
  - 3rd, Italian men's championships of cross-country skiing, 30 km
- 1970
  - 3rd, Italian men's championships of cross-country skiing, 50 km
- 1971
  - 3rd, Italian men's championships of cross-country skiing, 30 km

== Books ==
- Dario Fontanive, Due scie nel vento, Franco Manfroi Una vita pre lo sci, Edizioni Grafisma 2007 (in Italian)
