= Lotte Nogler =

Italian alpine skier (born 1947)

Lotte Nogler (born 27 February 1947, in Tscherms) is an Italian former alpine skier who competed in the 1968 Winter Olympics.
