= Denis Mast =

Swiss cross-country skier

Personal information
- Nationality: Swiss
- Born: 4 March 1941 (age 84); Les Verrières, Switzerland

Sport
- Sport: Cross-country skiing

Denis Mast (born 4 March 1941) is a Swiss cross-country skier. He competed in the men's 30 kilometre event at the 1968 Winter Olympics.
