= Thomas Gustafsson (bobsleigh) =

Swedish bobsledder (born 1948)

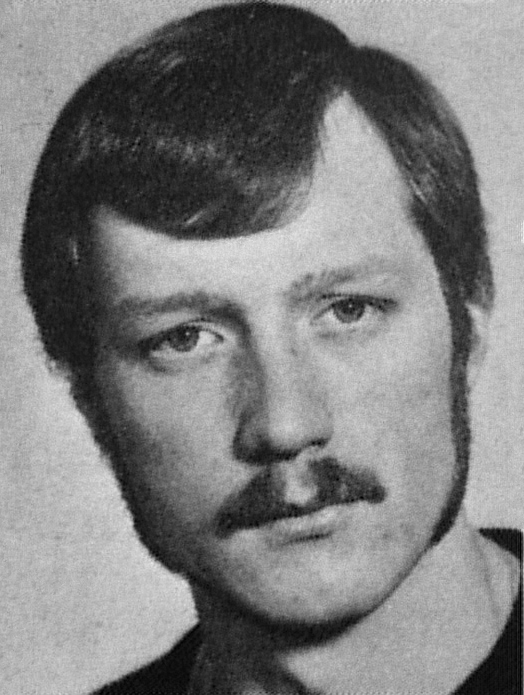

Personal information
- Nationality: Swedish
- Born: 29 March 1948 (age 77); Stockholm, Sweden

Sport
- Sport: Bobsleigh
- Club: Djurgårdens IF

Thomas Gustafsson (also Morghult; born 29 March 1948) is a retired Swedish bobsledder. He finished 11th in the four man event at the 1972 Winter Olympics.

Gustafsson represented Djurgårdens IF.
