= Francis Luiggi =

French bobsledder (1932–2019)

Personal information
- Nationality: French
- Born: 19 January 1932; Marseille, France
- Died: 1 August 2019 (aged 87); Sassenage, France

Sport
- Sport: Bobsleigh

Francis Luiggi (19 January 1932 – 1 August 2019) was a French bobsledder. He competed in the four-man event at the 1968 Winter Olympics.

His death was announced on 6 August 2019.
