= Manfred Hofer =

Austrian bobsledder

Personal information
- Nationality: Austrian
- Born: 15 June 1935 (age 91) Dornbirn, Austria
- Height: 184 cm (6 ft 0 in)
- Weight: 89 kg (196 lb)

Sport
- Sport: Bobsleigh
Medal record
Men's bobsleigh
Representing Austria
European Championships
Silver medal – second place	1966 Garmisch-Partenkirchen	Two-man

Manfred Hofer (born 15 June 1935) is an Austrian bobsledder. He competed in the four-man event at the 1968 Winter Olympics.
