= Claude Roussel (athlete) =

French bobsledder

Personal information
- Nationality: French
- Born: 29 May 1941; La Fresnaye, France
- Died: 19 May 1992 (aged 50)

Sport
- Sport: Bobsleigh

Claude Roussel (29 May 1941 – 19 May 1992) was a French bobsledder. He competed in the four-man event at the 1968 Winter Olympics.
