= Hans Ritzl =

Austrian bobsledder

Personal information
- Nationality: Austrian
- Born: 13 March 1939 (age 86); Innsbruck, Nazi Germany

Sport
- Sport: Bobsleigh

Hans Ritzl (born 13 March 1939) is an Austrian bobsledder. He competed in the four-man event at the 1968 Winter Olympics.
