= Maximiliano Cipriano Jones =

Maximiliano Cipriano Jones Brown (1870–1944) was a Fernandino who became the richest black planter of the island Fernando Po, Spanish Guinea in 1929.

== Family ==
Maximiliano Cipriano Jones Brow was son of Alfredo José Jones of Sierra Leone, and his wife Julia Brown. His wife was Rooth Níger. His son, Wilwardo Jones Níger, was also a planter on the island, and a political. His grandson Miguel Jones, was a Spanish soccer player, and his grandson José Luis Jones, was also a political.
