= Ernesto Maier =

Italian luger (born 1946)

Medal record

Luge

World Championships
Bronze medal – third place	1967 Hammarstrand	Men's doubles

Ernesto Maier (sometimes shown as Ernst Mair, born 1946) was an Italian luger who competed during the late 1960s and the early 1970s. He won the bronze medal in the men's doubles event at the 1967 FIL World Luge Championships in Hammarstrand, Sweden.

Maier also finished eighth in the men's doubles event at the 1972 Winter Olympics in Sapporo.
