= Adriano Frassinelli =

Italian bobsledder (born 1943)

Medal record

Bobsleigh

Representing Italy

Olympic Games
Silver medal – second place	1972 Sapporo	Four-man

World Championships
Gold medal – first place	1969 Lake Placid	Two-man

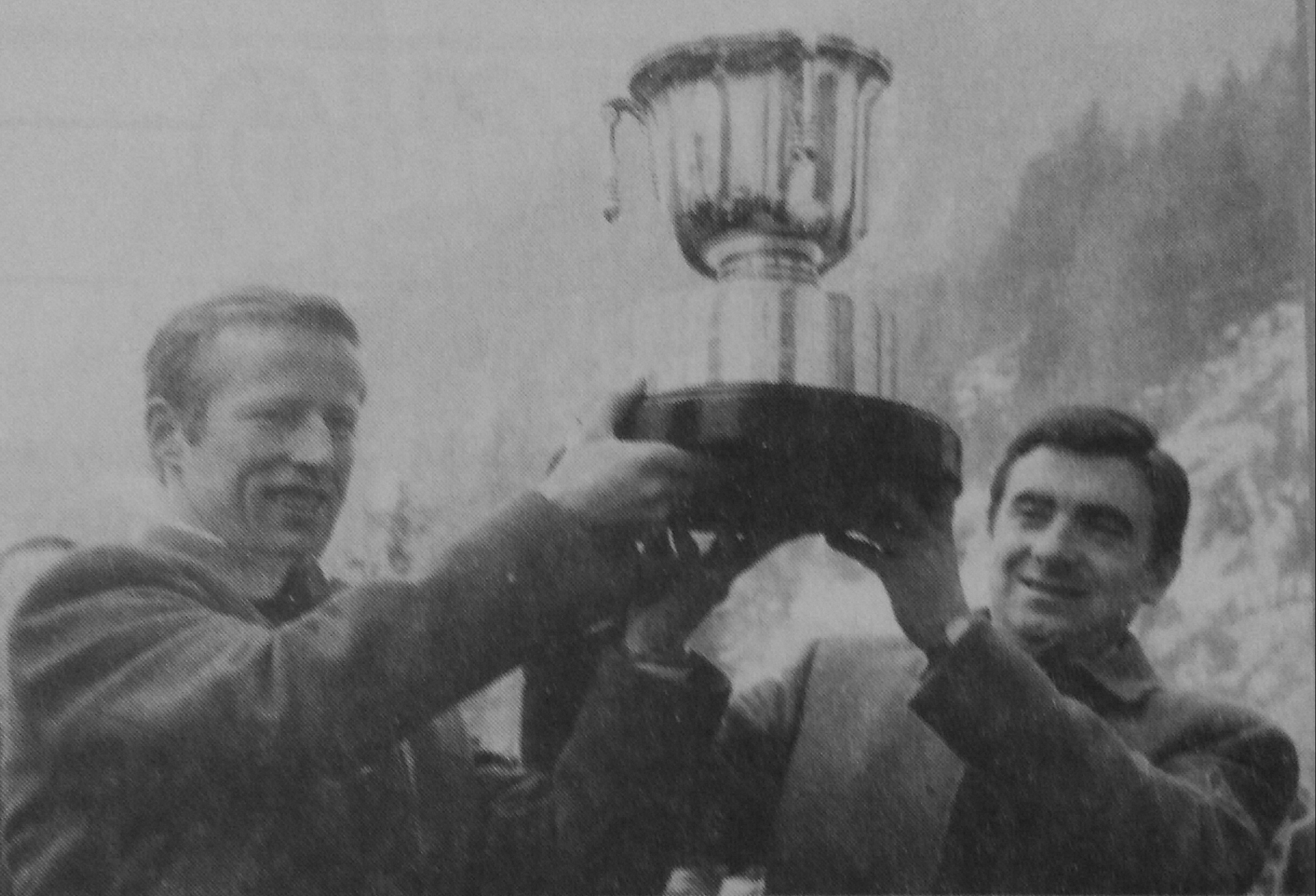

Adriano Frassinelli (born 11 April 1943) is an Italian bobsledder who competed in the late 1960s and early 1970s. He won the silver medal in the four-man event at the 1972 Winter Olympics in Sapporo.

He won a gold medal in the two-man event at the 1969 FIBT World Championships in Lake Placid, New York.
