= Luc Colin =

French cross-country skier (1935–1999)

Personal information
- Nationality: French
- Born: 1 June 1935; Bussang, France
- Died: 25 May 1999 (aged 63)

Sport
- Sport: Cross-country skiing

Luc Colin (1 June 1935 – 25 May 1999) was a French cross-country skier. He competed in the men's 30 kilometre event at the 1968 Winter Olympics.
