= Emilio Lechner =

Italian luger (born 1940)

Personal information
- Nationality: Italian
- Born: 8 November 1940 (age 84); Maranza, Italy

Sport
- Sport: Luge

Emilio Lechner (born 8 November 1940) is an Italian luger. He competed at the 1968 Winter Olympics and the 1972 Winter Olympics.
