= Guillermo Rosal =

Spanish bobsledder

Personal information
- Full name: Guillermo Rosal Bertrand
- Born: 23 March 1945 (age 81) Barcelona, Spain

Sport
- Sport: Bobsleigh
Medal record
Men's bobsleigh
Representing Spain
European Championships
Silver medal – second place	1970 Cortina d'Ampezzo	Four-man

Guillermo Rosal Bertrand (Note: In this Spanish name, the first or paternal surname is Rosal and the second or maternal family name is Bertrand.) (born 23 March 1945) is a Spanish bobsledder. He competed in the four-man event at the 1968 Winter Olympics.
