= David Dunn (bobsleigh) =

American bobsledder

Personal information
- Born: June 1, 1936 (age 90) Milwaukee, Wisconsin, United States

Sport
- Sport: Bobsleigh

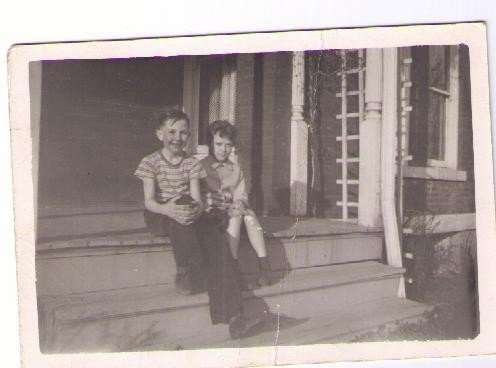
David Dunn and friend Corky Sonnors in Hillsboro, Ohio. Circa 1943

David Dunn (born June 1, 1936) is an American bobsledder. He competed in the four-man event at the 1968 Winter Olympics.
