= José Manuel Pérez-Muñoz =

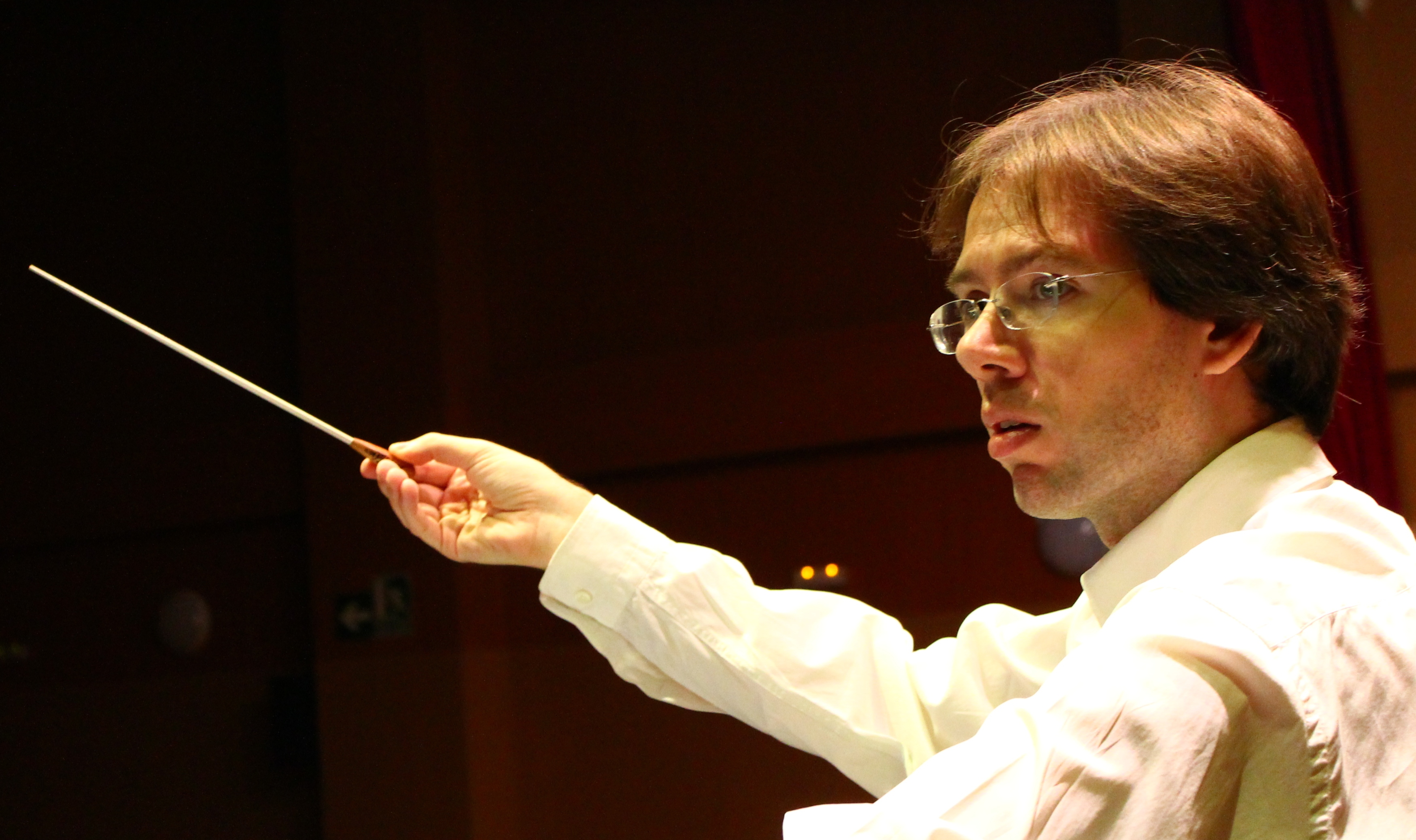

Background information
- Born: October 10, 1978 (age 47); Sevilla, Andalucía, Spain
- Genres: Film score
- Occupations: Film score composer, conductor
- Instrument: Piano
- Website: www.jmpmusica.com

José Manuel Pérez-Muñoz, is a Spanish composer and conductor born in Sevilla (Andalusia), Spain, on October 10, 1978

== Biography ==
José Manuel got his Composition degree from the Conservatorio Superior de Música de Sevilla. In 2006, he started his collaboration with the production company 2/14 (Dosdecatorce) in the creation of their audiovisual products, specifically short films and documentaries. In 2008, he wrote the music for the promotional videos of the Festival Iberoamericano de Huelva. That same year, he worked as music assistant for the TV show "La Batalla de los Coros." Between 2010 and 2012, he was a member of the organization committee of the Festival de Música de Cine de Úbeda, being in charge of concerts. In 2011, he arrived at the Conservatorio Profesional de Música de Osuna as professor of composition, teaching classes in Harmony, Analysis, and Basis for Composition. That same year, he created the seminar "Técnica de la Música de Cine" (Techniques in Film Music) at the Escuela Andaluza de Medios Audiovisuales ESAMA, which he still teaches. .

== Filmography ==
Ha compuesto las bandas sonoras originales de los siguientes audiovisuales:

- PieNegro directed by Guillermo Rojas (2006)
- En la otra camilla directed by Luis Melgar (2008)
- Milicianos andaluces directed by Luis Melgar (2008)
- Patrulla perdida directed by Guillermo Rojas (2009)

== Awards ==
- 2009 Mejor banda sonora original por "Patrulla Perdida" en el Festival Internacional de Cortometrajes Pilas en Corto
