= Adolf Scherwitzl =

Austrian biathlete (1938–2026)

Personal information
- Nationality: Austrian
- Born: 27 June 1938 Feistritz an der Gail, Gau Kärnten, Germany
- Died: 7 April 2026 (aged 87) Villach, Carinthia, Austria

Sport
- Sport: Biathlon

Adolf Scherwitzl (27 June 1938 – 7 April 2026) was an Austrian biathlete. He competed at the 1964 Winter Olympics and the 1968 Winter Olympics. Scherwitzl died in Villach, Carinthia on 7 April 2026, at the age of 87.
