= Antonio Marín Muñoz =

Spanish writer and historian (born 1970)

Antonio Marín Muñoz born in Lopera, Province of Jaen, Spain, 1970 is a writer and historian. He specializes in the contemporary history of Spain.

== Biography ==
Licensed in Law for her University of Granada. His first book went out to the light in the year 2001 and took for title The Civil war in Lopera and Porcuna (1936–1939), which already reaches the fourth edition. This book contains a biography of the English poets Ralph Fox and John Cornford.

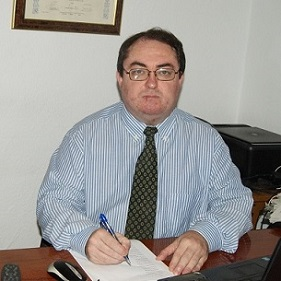
Antonio Marín Muñoz.

Close to his writer's facet, his collaboration is habitual in articles of opinion, of history, since of general information in the media of written communication. He is the Director and founder of the newspapers Campiña Digital and Lopera Digital.

His book, I Besiege to the Sanctuary of the Virgin of the Head (1936–1937) it has been a best-seller, since it is a question of a pleasant, rigorous work and of easy reading, that it makes wake up the interest of the reading lover of the history. The critique has emphasized the objectivity and the impartiality with the one that has treated this episode of the Spanish Civil War.

In his book "The reconstruction of the province of Jaén under Franco 'this writer includes a study of the works carried out by the Directorate General of Devastated Regions in the province of Jaén during Franco (1939-1957). Detail of the reconstruction after the civil war.

In 2012 the publisher Portilla Foundation, located in Florida (USA), has published his novel "The difficult years in Jaen," which reconstructs the life of a Spanish during the war in a town of Jaen.

This writer published in the 2014 historical novel "A nurse at the Battle of Lopera," which has been published by the Editorial Circle Red. In this book the story of a nurse who develops its work in the Battle of Lopera (1936), during the Spanish civil war is discussed. You learn about the harsh working conditions at the front, love, deceit, motherhood ...

In the year 2019 he published the novel "Republic. Jaén 1931", edited by the Editorial Red Circle, and that gathers the singular history of the journeyman Andrés Martos who will live fully the entry into the Second Spanish Republic (1931-1936). In this book, fiction is mixed with historical data, a good ingredient for lovers of history.

In 2025, his new novel, "Death of Peasants in the Olive Groves of Jaén," was published. This historical fiction recounts a series of peasant strikes that took place in Lopera (Jaén) between 1919 and 1920.

== Bibliography ==
- The Civil war in Lopera and Porcuna (1936-1939). Vestiges of the contest. (2001). ISBN 978-84-607-2112-3.
- Vestiges of the Civil war in Lopera (Edits the Official Chamber of Trade and Industry of Jaen) (2002). ISBN 84-95425-12-2.
- I besiege to the Sanctuary of the Virgin of the Head, of Andújar (1936-1937) (2004). ISBN 978-84-612-2222-3.
- Postwar period in Lopera (1939-1950) (2006). ISBN 84-611-1346-2.
- The reconstruction of the province of Jaen under the Franco's regime (1939-1957) (2007). ISBN 978-84-611-8488-0.
- Those terrible years (2010). ISBN 978-84-614-3526-5.
- The difficult years in Jaen (Editorial Portilla Foundation) (2012). ISBN 978-1-4774-1261-9.
- A nurse at the Battle of Lopera (Editorial Red Circle) (2014). ISBN 978-84-9050-977-7.
- Republic. Jaén 1931 (Editorial Red Circle) (2019). ISBN 978-84-1317-402-0.
- Death of Peasants in the Olive Groves of Jaén. Editorial Grupo J3V. (2025). ISBN 979-13-990334-9-6.
