= Louis Courtois (bobsleigh) =

French bobsledder

Personal information
- Nationality: French
- Born: 27 January 1938; Sassenage, France
- Died: 3 April 2001 (aged 63)

Sport
- Sport: Bobsleigh

Louis Courtois (27 January 1938 – 3 April 2001) was a French bobsledder. He competed in the four-man event at the 1968 Winter Olympics, finishing 11th.
