= Ion Pervilhac =

French luger (born 1947)

Personal information
- Nationality: French
- Born: 28 May 1947 (age 77); New York City, United States

Sport
- Sport: Luge

Ion Pervilhac (born 28 May 1947) is a French luger. He competed in the men's singles and doubles events at the 1968 Winter Olympics.
