= Howard Siler =

American bobsledder

Medal record

Bobsleigh

Representing the United States

World Championships
| Bronze medal – third place | 1969 Lake Placid | Four-man |

Howard Banford Siler Jr. (June 18, 1945 – July 8, 2014) was an American bobsledder who competed from the late 1960s to the early 1980s.

== Biography ==
Howard Siler won a bronze medal in the four-man bobsledding event at the 1969 FIBT World Championships in Lake Placid, New York. Competing in two Winter Olympics, Siler's best Olympic finish was fifth place in the two-man event at the 1980 Winter Olympics in Lake Placid. In all, he was a 5-time US champion and a 9-time member of the US World team.

in 1985 Siler served as the United States team coach and also as chairman of the US Bobsled Federation Competition Committee. Siler later coached the Jamaican bobsleigh team that participated at the 1988 Winter Olympics in Calgary. He was the inspiration for the character of Irving "Irv" Blitzer (played by John Candy) in the American film Cool Runnings (1993).

Unlike the fictional Blitzer, Siler was employed outside his sporting activities, as an insurance executive. He died July 8, 2014, at his home in Clermont, Florida at the age of 69. In his obituary published by the Los Angeles Times, Siler's wife Debra Shea Siler is quoted as saying her husband was disappointed that Cool Runnings portrayed the Jamaican athletes as "cutesy, silly." Siler had agreed to coach the Jamaican bobsledding team because he found them to be serious and committed athletes.
