= José María Palomo =

Spanish bobsledder

Personal information
- Nationality: Spanish
- Born: 24 July 1946; Barcelona, Spain
- Died: 30 November 2020 (aged 74)

Sport
- Sport: Bobsleigh

José María Palomo (24 July 1946 – 30 November 2020) was a Spanish bobsledder. He competed in the two-man event at the 1968 Winter Olympics.
