= Georges Tresallet =

French luger (born 1937)

Personal information
- Nationality: French
- Born: 7 November 1937 (age 87); Albertville, France

Sport
- Sport: Luge

Georges Tresallet (born 7 November 1937) is a French luger. He competed in the men's singles and doubles events at the 1968 Winter Olympics.
