= Glorianda Cipolla =

Italian alpine skier (born 1946)

Glorianda Cipolla (born 2 October 1946) is an Italian former alpine skier who competed in the 1968 Winter Olympics.
