= Michel Thépénier =

French speed skater (born 1945)

Personal information
- Nationality: French
- Born: 6 January 1945 Charens, France
- Died: 24 September 2025 (aged 80)

Sport
- Sport: Speed skating

Michel Thépénier (6 January 1945 – 24 September 2025) was a French speed skater. He competed in three events at the 1968 Winter Olympics.
