= Paul Ernst (biathlete) =

Austrian biathlete (1935–2024)

Personal information
- Nationality: Austrian
- Born: 11 September 1935 Reutte, Austria
- Died: 27 March 2024 (aged 88)

Sport
- Sport: Biathlon

Paul Ernst (11 September 1935 – 27 March 2024) was an Austrian biathlete. He competed at the 1964 Winter Olympics and the 1968 Winter Olympics.
