= Robert Huscher =

American bobsledder (1938–2024)

Medal record

Bobsleigh

World Championships
Bronze medal – third place	1969 Lake Placid	Four-man

Robert Huscher (January 23, 1938 – February 12, 2024) was an American bobsledder who competed in the late 1960s. Huscher was in the US Navy when he competed in the 1968 Winter Olympics. He won a bronze medal in the four-man event at the 1969 FIBT World Championships in Lake Placid, New York. Huscher died on February 12, 2024, at the age of 86.

== Sources ==
- Bobsleigh four-man world championship medalists since 1930
- Wallechinsky, David (1984). "Bobsled: Two-man". In The Complete Book of the Olympics: 1896 - 1980. New York: Penguin Books. p. 559.
