= Horst Schneider =

Austrian biathlete (born 1939)

Personal information
- Nationality: Austrian
- Born: 13 February 1939 (age 86) Lienz, Nazi Germany

Sport
- Sport: Biathlon

Horst Schneider (born 13 February 1939) is an Austrian biathlete. He competed in the 20 km individual event at the 1968 Winter Olympics.
