= Henri Sirvain =

French bobsledder

Personal information
- Nationality: French
- Born: 6 September 1941 (age 83); Thorens-Glières, France

Sport
- Sport: Bobsleigh

Henri Sirvain (born 6 September 1941) is a French bobsledder. He competed in the two-man and the four-man events at the 1968 Winter Olympics.
