= Hans Hallén =

Swedish bobsledder

Personal information
- Nationality: Swedish
- Born: 9 October 1935; Njurunda, Sweden
- Died: 22 February 2013 (aged 77); Sundsvall, Sweden

Sport
- Sport: Bobsleigh

Hans Hallén (9 October 1935 – 22 February 2013) was a Swedish bobsledder. He competed in the four-man event at the 1968 Winter Olympics.
