= Ernst Schmidt (communist) =

German communist activist in West Germany during the Cold War

- Born: 12 October 1924
- Died: 16 December 2009 (aged 85)
- Conviction: Anti-constitutional activities
- Penalty: 15 months imprisonment

Ernst Schmidt (12 October 1924 – 16 December 2009) was a German communist activist in West Germany during the Cold War. He was an active member of the Communist Party of Germany, which was banned as unconstitutional in 1956, and was sentenced to prison for anti-constitutional activities. Late in life and after abandoning communism, he was noted as a local historian in Essen.

== Life ==
Schmidt was an eager member of Hitlerjugend and served as a soldier on the eastern front during the Second World War. After being taken prisoner of war, he attended a Comintern indoctrination school in the Soviet Union and became a fanatical Stalinist prior to his return to Germany. After the war, he joined the Communist Party of Germany, which was banned by the West German government in 1956. In the 1950s, Schmidt was one of the publishers of the newspaper Der Ruhrbote, which supported the then-banned Communist Party. For this reason he was sentenced to 15 months imprisonment for anti-constitutional activities. He served six months and was released on parole. In 1968 he joined the German Communist Party.

In the 1970s, he began revisiting his political views and finally came to abandon communism, which he later would describe as the second totalitarian ideology he had succumbed to. He left the German Communist Party and other communist-affiliated organisations such as the partially banned VVN in 1982. In the same year, he earned a doctorate in history at the University of Bremen. In 1986, he joined the SPD. Late in life, he built an archive on the local history of Essen in the 19th and 20th centuries, and published an autobiography titled Vom Staatsfeind zum Stadthistoriker ("From Enemy of the State to City Historian").

== Publications ==
- Vom Staatsfeind zum Stadthistoriker. Essen: Klartext, 1998
