= Sven Martinsson =

Swedish bobsledder

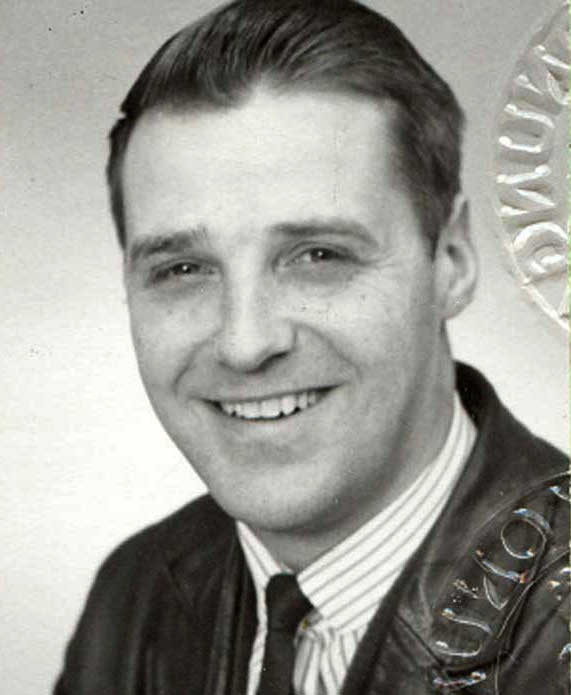

Personal information
- Born: 22 September 1935 (age 90) Götene, Sweden
- Height: 179 cm (5 ft 10 in)
- Weight: 73 kg (161 lb)

Sport
- Sport: Bobsled
- Club: Ostermans Boblag, Stockholm

Sven Erik Martinsson (born 22 September 1935) is a retired Swedish bobsledder. He competed in the four-man event at the 1968 Winter Olympics and finished 16th.
