= Martine Ivangine =

French speed skater (born 1947)

Personal information
- Nationality: French
- Born: 12 December 1947 (age 77); Saint-Gervais, France

Sport
- Sport: Speed skating

Martine Ivangine (born 12 December 1947) is a French speed skater. She competed in four events at the 1968 Winter Olympics.
