= André Patey =

French bobsledder (1942–2020)

Personal information
- Nationality: French
- Born: 16 January 1942
- Died: 16 February 2020 (aged 78)

Sport
- Sport: Bobsleigh

André Patey (16 January 1942 – 16 February 2020) was a French bobsledder. He competed in the four-man event at the 1968 Winter Olympics.
