= Hans Baumann (bobsleigh) =

German bobsledder (born 1932)

Hans Baumann (born 26 December 1932) is a former German bobsledder who competed at the 1968 Winter Olympics. In Grenoble he was a member of the West German four-man bobsleigh team, alongside Wolfgang Zimmerer, Stefan Gaisreiter, and Peter Utzschneider, that finished ninth in the event among nineteen squads. He was born in Munich and was a member of Bobclub München.
