= José María Pérez =

José María Pérez may refer to:

- José María Pérez de Urdininea (1784–1865), Bolivian politician, the third President of Bolivia
- José María Pérez Medrano (1920–2008), Spanish footballer who played as a forward for Real Sociedad
- José María Pérez Gay (1944–2013), Mexican academic, writer, translator and diplomatic
- José María Pérez, Cuba is a small town in Villa Clara, Cuba
