= José Clot =

Spanish bobsledder (born 1946)

Personal information
- Nationality: Spanish
- Born: 22 January 1946 (age 79); Barcelona, Spain

Sport
- Sport: Bobsleigh

José Clot (born 22 January 1946) is a Spanish bobsledder. He competed in the four-man event at the 1968 Winter Olympics.
