= Andrea Clemente =

Italian bobsledder (1942–1970)

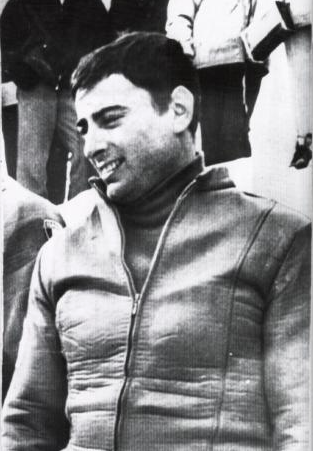
- Clemente in 1970

Personal information
- Nationality: Italian
- Born: 6 July 1942 San Nicola, Italy
- Died: 16 January 1970 (aged 27) Breuil-Cervinia, Italy

Sport
- Sport: Bobsleigh
Medal record
Men's bobsleigh
Representing Italy
European Championships
Bronze medal – third place	1969 Cervinia	Two-man

Andrea Clemente (6 July 1942 – 16 January 1970) was an Italian bobsledder. He competed in the four-man event at the 1968 Winter Olympics.
