= Jean Jobez =

French cross-country skier (born 1943)

Personal information
- Nationality: French
- Born: 17 April 1943 (age 81); Bellefontaine, France

Sport
- Sport: Cross-country skiing

Jean Jobez (born 17 April 1943) is a French cross-country skier. He competed at the 1968 Winter Olympics and the 1972 Winter Olympics.
