= Sergio Pompanin =

Italian bobsledder (born 1939)

Medal record

Bobsleigh

World Championships
Silver medal – second place	1969 Lake Placid	Four-man

Sergio Pompanin (born March 6, 1939) is an Italian bobsledder who competed in the late 1960s. He won a silver medal in the four-man event at the 1969 FIBT World Championships in Lake Placid, New York.
