= Aimé Gruet-Masson =

French biathlete (1940–2014)

Personal information
- Nationality: French
- Born: 8 December 1940; Septmoncel, France
- Died: 12 July 2014 (aged 73)

Sport
- Sport: Biathlon

Aimé Gruet-Masson (8 December 1940 – 12 July 2014) was a French biathlete. He competed at the 1968 Winter Olympics, the 1972 Winter Olympics and the 1976 Winter Olympics.
