= Jean-Claude Viry =

French biathlete (1943–2011)

Personal information
- Nationality: French
- Born: 15 August 1943; La Bresse, France
- Died: 20 April 2011 (aged 67)

Sport
- Sport: Biathlon

Jean-Claude Viry (15 August 1943 – 20 April 2011) was a French biathlete. He competed at the 1968 Winter Olympics and the 1976 Winter Olympics.
