= Philippe Baradel =

French cross-country skier (1938–2009)

Personal information
- Nationality: French
- Born: 6 January 1938; Gérardmer, France
- Died: 31 March 2009 (aged 71)

Sport
- Sport: Cross-country skiing

Philippe Baradel (6 January 1938 – 31 March 2009) was a French cross-country skier. He competed in the men's 30 kilometre event at the 1968 Winter Olympics.
