= Bertrand Croset =

French bobsledder

Personal information
- Nationality: French
- Born: 20 June 1941; Thorens-Glières, France
- Died: 7 February 2002 (aged 60); Annecy, France

Sport
- Sport: Bobsleigh

Bertrand Croset (20 June 1941 – 7 February 2002) was a French bobsledder. He competed in the two-man and the four-man events at the 1968 Winter Olympics.
