= Gianni Bonichon =

Italian bobsledder (1944–2010)

Medal record

Bobsleigh

Representing Italy

Olympic Games
Silver medal – second place	1972 Sapporo	Four-man

Gianni Bonichon (13 October 1944 – 3 January 2010) was an Italian bobsledder who competed in the late 1960s and early 1970s. He won the silver medal in the four-man event at the 1972 Winter Olympics in Sapporo.

Bonichon was born in Nus and died in Aosta, on 3 January 2010.
