= Brigitte Seiwald =

Austrian alpine skier (born 1945)

Brigitte Seiwald (born 12 September 1945 in Innsbruck) is an Austrian former alpine skier who competed in the 1968 Winter Olympics.
