= Karl Pichler =

Austrian bobsledder

Personal information
- Nationality: Austrian
- Born: 2 December 1937 (age 88) Gargazon, Italy
- Height: 184 cm (6 ft 0 in)
- Weight: 95 kg (209 lb)

Sport
- Sport: Bobsleigh
Medal record
Men's bobsleigh
Representing Austria
European Championships
Silver medal – second place	1966 Garmisch-Partenkirchen	Two-man

Karl Pichler (born 2 December 1937) is an Austrian bobsledder. He competed in the four-man event at the 1968 Winter Olympics.
