= Otmar Braunecker =

Austrian speed skater (born 1943)

Personal information
- Nationality: Austrian
- Born: 4 April 1943 (age 81); Klagenfurt, Nazi Germany

Sport
- Sport: Speed skating

Otmar Braunecker (born 4 April 1943) is an Austrian speed skater. He competed at the 1968 Winter Olympics and the 1972 Winter Olympics.
