= Fritz Dinkhauser =

Austrian politician (born 1940)

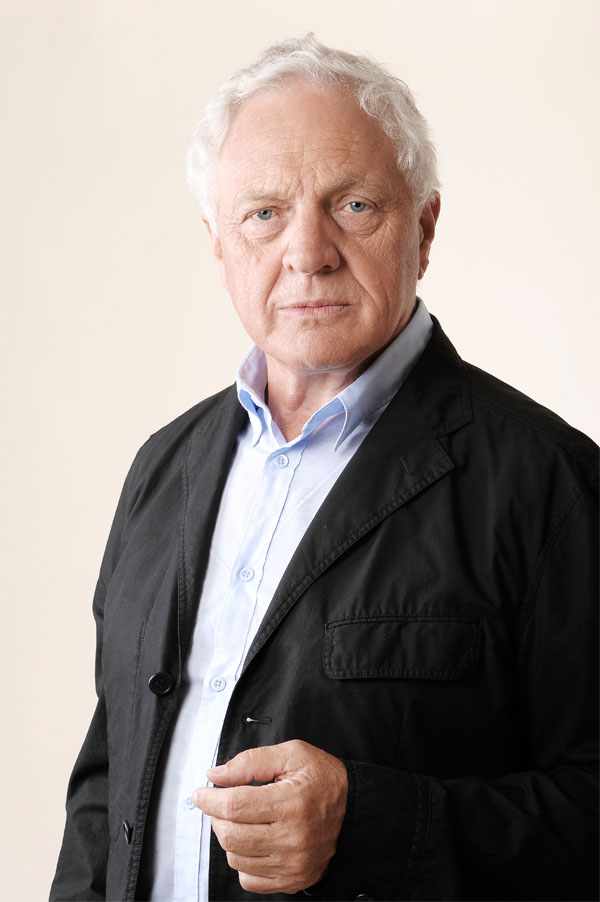
Portrait of Dinkhauser from 2008

Friedrich Josef Lienhard "Fritz" Dinkhauser (born 16 April 1940) is an Austrian politician.

Born in Innsbruck, he competed in sports in his youth and won the Tyrol state championship in the hammer throw on six occasions and represented Austria at the 1968 Winter Olympics in the bobsleigh. At that competition he placed eighth in the two-man bob with Max Kaltenberger and 13th in the four-man event.

After retiring from sports he entered politics through the labour movement, working as secretary for ÖAAB Tyrol, which was a socialist Christian trade union body associated with the Austrian People's Party. He worked as kammerrat for the Tyrol-level Austrian Chamber of Labour in 1979 and served as the vice-chairman of that body from 1985 to 1989. He became regional chairman in 1991 then, after a brief period as national vice chairman, rose to head the ÖAAB nationally in 1994.

He founded Citizens' Forum Austria in 2008 for the Tyrolean state election that year and became a member of the Tyrolean Parliament. He later stood nationally, but his party did not receive sufficient votes to enter Austrian Parliament.

He was given the Decoration of Honour for Services to the Republic of Austria in 2007.
