= Gérard Monrazel =

French bobsledder

Personal information
- Nationality: French
- Born: 30 April 1943 (age 81); Lafayette, Algeria

Sport
- Sport: Bobsleigh

Gérard Monrazel (born 30 April 1943) is a French bobsledder. He competed in the four-man event at the 1968 Winter Olympics.
