= Yoshiyuki Ichihashi =

Japanese bobsledder (born 1949)

Personal information
- Nationality: Japanese
- Born: 6 March 1949 (age 76); Hokkaido, Japan

Sport
- Sport: Bobsleigh

Yoshiyuki Ichihashi (市橋 善行, Ichihashi Yoshiyuki, born 6 March 1949) is a Japanese bobsledder. He competed in the four man event at the 1972 Winter Olympics.
