= José Pérez de Lama Halcón =

José Pérez de Lama (died 31 July 2025), also known as Osfa, was a Spanish architect, researcher, and teacher. He was known for his contribution to contemporary architectural thought, digital urbanism, and free culture.

== Experimental work and activism ==
Under the pseudonym "Osfa", he was one of the founding members of the hackitectura.net collective (2000–11), from which he promoted various initiatives dedicated to exploring the links between free technologies, social networks, and urban territories. In this context, his contribution to the development of Indymedia Estrecho (2003-2007), Fadaiat (2004 and 2005), WikiPlaza (2009-2010), and Mapping the Commons (2010/11) stands out. Some of the results of these initiatives were presented at renowned international institutions, such as the ZKM Center for Art and Media Technology in Karlsruhe or LABoral.

== Career ==
Pérez de Lama studied at the University of Seville and the University of California, Los Angeles (UCLA). In 2007, he obtained his doctorate with the thesis Entre Blade Runner y Mickey Mouse. Nuevas condiciones urbanas: una perspectiva desde Los Angeles, California (1999-2002).

In 2017, he was appointed Associate Professor in the area of Architectural Composition at the School of Architecture of the University of Seville. In addition to his work as a professor and researcher at the school, he also held the positions of Deputy Director of Teaching Innovation and Adjunct Director of the Innovation and Design Center [IND]. He also played a fundamental role in the establishment and consolidation of FabLab Sevilla, which he directed until 2017. This work was accompanied by important reflection and theorization on the intersection between free culture and digital manufacturing. Under his leadership, in 2011 FabLab Sevilla became part of the international FabLab Network, promoted by the Center for Bits and Atoms of the Massachusetts Institute of Technology.

Pérez de Lama authored numerous publications, including articles in journals, books, and collaborations in collective works. His last book, Máquinas rebeldes - Sobre arquitectura, ciudad y mundo digital, collects texts published by Pérez de Lama between 1999 and 2017, grouped into three stages: punk years, years of enthusiasm, and years of melancholy.

In 1995, he received the City of Seville Research Prize for the study Biografía del patio mediterráneo. Thirty years later, in 2025, a new edition would be published, presented posthumously at the Official College of Architects of Seville.

In 1987, he participated in the drafting of the Master Plan for the EXPO'92 Universal Exposition in Seville, collaborating with Jaime López de Asiaín and other co-authors on the chapter about the bioclimatic conditioning of open spaces.

He was also notable for his active work as a blogger, serving as editor of Arquitectura Contable from 2014, and previously, among others, on his teaching blog CA 1112/a @ htca4 (2007-2014).

== Death ==
Pérez de Lama died on July 31, 2025.
