= Franz Vetter =

Austrian skier (1933–2009)

Personal information
- Nationality: Austrian
- Born: 3 December 1933 Steinach am Brenner, Austria
- Died: 21 October 2009 (aged 75)

Sport
- Sport: Biathlon, cross-country skiing

Franz Vetter (3 December 1933 – 21 October 2009) was an Austrian skier. He competed at the 1964 Winter Olympics and the 1968 Winter Olympics.
