= Fritz Stuessi =

Swiss cross-country skier

Personal information
- Nationality: Swiss
- Born: 15 March 1945; Glarus, Switzerland
- Died: 8 July 1970 (aged 25)

Sport
- Sport: Cross-country skiing

Fritz Stuessi (15 March 1945 – 8 July 1970) was a Swiss cross-country skier. He competed in the men's 30 kilometre event at the 1968 Winter Olympics.
