= Guido Gillarduzzi =

Italian speed skater

Personal information
- Nationality: Italian
- Born: 7 October 1939 Cortina d'Ampezzo, Italy
- Died: 30 April 2016 (aged 76) San Candido, Italy

Sport
- Sport: Speed skating

Guido Gillarduzzi (7 October 1939 – 30 April 2016) was an Italian speed skater. He competed in four events at the 1968 Winter Olympics.
