= Willi Hofmann =

Swiss bobsledder (born 1940)

Medal record

Men's bobsleigh

Representing Switzerland

Olympic Games
Bronze medal – third place	1968 Grenoble	Four-man

European Championships
Gold medal – first place	1968 St. Moritz	Four-man

Willi Hofmann (born 27 December 1940) is a Swiss bobsledder who competed in the late 1960s and early 1970s. He won a bronze medal in the four-man event at the 1968 Winter Olympics in Grenoble.
