= Hansruedi Widmer =

Swiss speed skater (born 1944)

Personal information
- Born: 4 April 1944 (age 82) Basel, Switzerland
- Died: 1994 or earlier
- Height: 1.75 m (5 ft 9 in)
- Weight: 68 kg (150 lb)

Sport
- Sport: Speed skating
- Club: Internationaler Schlittschuh-Club Davos

Hansruedi Widmer (born 4 April 1944) is a retired speed skater from Switzerland. He competed at the 1968 Winter Olympics in the 500 m and 1500 m events and finished beyond the 40th position.

Personal bests:

- 500 m – 40.4 (1973)
- 1000 m – 1:22.9 (1973)
- 1500 m – 2:10.05 (1974)
- 5000 m – 8:00.2 (1969)
- 10000 m - 16:46.5 (1969)
