= Phil Duprey =

American bobsledder

Personal information
- Nationality: American
- Born: February 6, 1944 Lake Placid, New York, United States
- Died: February 17, 2015 (aged 71)

Sport
- Sport: Bobsleigh

Phil Duprey (February 6, 1944 – February 17, 2015) was an American bobsledder. He competed at the 1968, 1972 and the 1976 Winter Olympics.
