= François Perrenoud =

French speed skater (born 1949)

Personal information
- Nationality: French
- Born: 21 November 1949 (age 75); Vevey, Switzerland

Sport
- Sport: Speed skating

François Perrenoud (born 21 November 1949) is a French speed skater. He competed in four events at the 1968 Winter Olympics.
