= Antonio Marín (bobsleigh) =

Spanish bobsledder

Personal information
- Nationality: Spanish
- Born: 29 March 1945 (age 79); Barcelona, Spain

Sport
- Sport: Bobsleigh

Antonio Marín (born 29 March 1945) is a Spanish bobsledder. He competed in the four-man event at the 1968 Winter Olympics.
