= Pepi Bader =

West German bobsledder (1941–2021)

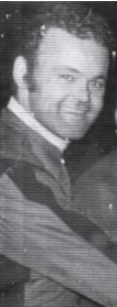
- Bader in 1970

Medal record

Men's bobsleigh

Representing West Germany

Olympic Games
Silver medal – second place	1968 Grenoble	Two-man
Silver medal – second place	1972 Sapporo	Two-man

World Championships
Gold medal – first place	1970 St. Moritz	Two-man
Silver medal – second place	1970 St. Moritz	Four-man

European Championships
Silver medal – second place	1970 Cortina d'Ampezzo	Two-man

Josef "Pepi" Bader (29 May 1941 – 30 October 2021) was a West German bobsledder who competed in the late 1960s and early 1970s. He was born in Grainau.

Competing in two Winter Olympics, he won silver medals in the two-man event both in 1968 and 1972.

Bader also won two medals at the 1970 FIBT World Championships in St. Moritz with a gold in the two-man event and a silver in the four-man event.

Bader died in Garmisch-Partenkirchen on 30 October 2021, at the age of 80.
