= José Pérez (Cuban footballer) =

Cuban footballer

Personal information
- Full name: José Alberto Pérez Oquendo
- Date of birth: 15 September 1999 (age 27)
- Place of birth: Cuba
- Position: Midfielder

Team information
- Current team: FC Ciudad de La Habana

Senior career*
Years	Team	Apps	(Gls)
2019–	FC Ciudad de La Habana		

International career^{‡}
2018	Cuba U20	2	(1)
2019–	Cuba	5	(0)
- * Club domestic league appearances and goals as of 14 April 2021 ‡ National team caps and goals as of 14 April 2021

José Alberto Pérez Oquendo (born 15 September 1999) is a Cuban professional football player who plays for FC Ciudad de La Habana.

== Club career ==
José Pérez made his professional debut for Cuba on the 12 Octobre 2019 in a CONCACAF Nations League A loss against the United States.
