= José Miguel Pérez (triathlete) =

Spanish triathlete

José Miguel Pérez (born 31 August 1986, in Cuenca, Spain) is a Spanish triathlete.

At the 2012 Summer Olympics men's triathlon on Tuesday 7 August he placed 24th.
