= Ernst Schmidt (bobsleigh) =

Swiss bobsledder (born 1942)

Personal information
- Nationality: Swiss
- Born: 13 August 1942 (age 82); Veltheim, Switzerland

Sport
- Sport: Bobsleigh

Ernst Schmidt (born 13 August 1942) is a Swiss bobsledder. He competed in the four-man event at the 1968 Winter Olympics.
