= Jacques Christaud-Pipola =

French bobsledder

Personal information
- Nationality: French
- Born: 13 August 1948 (age 76); Voiron, France

Sport
- Sport: Bobsleigh

Jacques Christaud-Pipola (born 13 August 1948) is a French bobsledder. He competed at the 1968 Winter Olympics and the 1972 Winter Olympics.
