= José Manuel Pérez (footballer) =

Spanish footballer

Personal information
- Full name: José Manuel Pérez Rodríguez
- Date of birth: 24 May 1985 (age 41)
- Place of birth: Seville, Spain
- Height: 1.79 m (5 ft 10 in)
- Position: Left back

Youth career
- Sevilla

Senior career*
Years	Team	Apps	(Gls)
2004–2009	Sevilla C		
2007–2008	Sevilla B	7	(0)
2009–2010	Lucena	29	(0)
2010–2011	Alcalá	10	(0)
2011–2012	Sporting Villanueva	13	(1)
2012	Móstoles	1	(0)
2012–2014	Racing Ferrol	74	(2)
2014–2015	Cultural Leonesa	32	(2)
2015–2017	Burgos	3	(0)
- * Club domestic league appearances and goals

José Manuel Pérez Rodríguez (born 24 May 1985) is a Spanish former footballer who played as a left back.

== Club career ==
Born in Seville, Andalusia, Pérez graduated from local Sevilla FC's youth system, making his senior debuts with the C-team in the 2004–05 season, in Tercera División. Two years later he first featured with the reserves, being promoted from Segunda División B, and on 11 November 2007 played his first game as a professional, starting in a 1–0 away win against CD Numancia in the Segunda División.

On 28 January 2009 Pérez joined Lucena CF, also in the third division. He then continued his career in the same category but also in the fourth level, representing CD Alcalá, Sporting Villanueva Promesas and Racing de Ferrol, achieving promotion to division three with the latter in 2013 by appearing in 32 matches and scoring once.

On 14 July 2014, Pérez moved to Cultural y Deportiva Leonesa.
