= Patricia Demartini =

French speed skater (born 1950)

Personal information
- Nationality: French
- Born: 14 August 1950 (age 74); Grenoble, France

Sport
- Sport: Speed skating

Patricia Demartini (born 14 August 1950) is a French speed skater. She competed in two events at the 1968 Winter Olympics.
