= Maximiliano Jones (bobsledder) =

Spanish bobsledder

Personal information
- Full name: Maximiliano Jones Ivina
- Nationality: Spain
- Born: 17 June 1944 (age 82) Santa Isabel, Spanish Guinea (now Malabo, Equatorial Guinea)

Sport
- Sport: Bobsleigh

Maximiliano Jones Ivina (born 17 June 1944) is a Spanish bobsledder. He competed in the two-man and the four-man events at the 1968 Winter Olympics.
