= Hansruedi Müller =

Swiss bobsledder (born 1940)

Personal information
- Nationality: Swiss
- Born: 8 November 1940 (age 84); Koblenz, Germany

Sport
- Sport: Bobsleigh

Hansruedi Müller (born 8 November 1940) is a Swiss bobsledder. He competed in the four-man event at the 1968 Winter Olympics.
