= Max Forster =

Swiss bobsledder (born 1934)

Medal record

Bobsleigh

World Championships
| Gold medal – first place | 1971 Cervinia | Four-man |
| Bronze medal – third place | 1970 St. Moritz | Four-man |

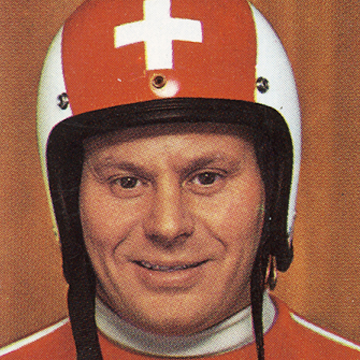
Max Forster, Swiss Olympian

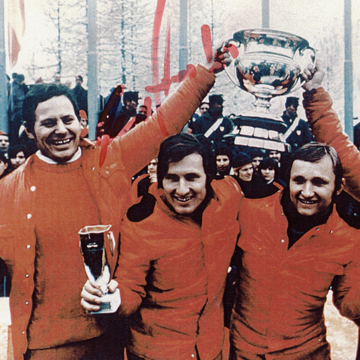
World Championships 1971, Cervina, Italy

Max Forster (born November 3, 1934) is a Swiss bobsledder who competed in the early 1970s. He won two medals in the four-man event at the FIBT World Championships with a gold in 1971 and a bronze in 1970. He also competed at the 1968 Winter Olympics.
