= Walter Graf (bobsledder) =

Swiss bobsledder (1937–2021)

Medal record

Men's bobsleigh

Representing Switzerland

Olympic Games
| Bronze medal – third place | 1968 Grenoble | Four-man |

European Championships
| Gold medal – first place | 1968 St. Moritz | Four-man |

Walter Andreas Graf (3 March 1937 – 2 February 2021) was a Swiss bobsledder who competed in the late 1960s and early 1970s. He won a bronze medal in the four-man event at the 1968 Winter Olympics in Grenoble.
