= Fabio Morandini =

Italian Nordic combined skier

Personal information
- Nationality: Italian
- Born: 17 December 1945 (age 79); Predazzo, Trentino-Alto Adige, Italy

Sport
- Sport: Nordic combined

Fabio Morandini (Italian pronunciation: [ˈfaːbjo moˈrandiːni]; born 17 December 1945) is an Italian skier. He competed in the Nordic combined at the 1968 Winter Olympics and the 1972 Winter Olympics.
