= Marie-Louise Perrenoud =

French speed skater (born 1947)

Personal information
- Nationality: French
- Born: 6 July 1947 (age 77); Prague, Czechoslovakia

Sport
- Sport: Speed skating

Marie-Louise Perrenoud (born 6 July 1947) is a French speed skater. She competed in four events at the 1968 Winter Olympics.
