= José Miguel Pérez (fencer) =

Puerto Rican fencer

Personal information
- Born: 7 June 1938 Quebradillas, Puerto Rico
- Died: 1 May 2024 (aged 85) Quebradillas, Puerto Rico

Sport
- Sport: Fencing

José Miguel Pérez (7 June 1938 – 2 May 2024) was a Puerto Rican fencer. He competed in the individual and team épée events at the 1968 Summer Olympics.
