= Giuseppe Rescigno =

Italian bobsledder (1934–1984)

Personal information
- Nationality: Italian
- Born: 13 March 1934; Castel San Giorgio, Italy
- Died: 3 June 1984 (aged 50)

Sport
- Sport: Bobsleigh

Giuseppe Rescigno (13 March 1934 – 3 June 1984) was an Italian bobsledder. He competed in the four-man event at the 1968 Winter Olympics.
