= Herbert Gruber =

Austrian bobsledder (born 1942)

Medal record

Men's bobsleigh

Representing Austria

Olympic Games
Silver medal – second place	1968 Grenoble	Four-man

World Championships
Bronze medal – third place	1971 Cervinia	Two-man

European Championships
Silver medal – second place	1967 Igls	Four-man

Herbert Gruber (born 9 November 1942) is an Austrian bobsledder who competed in the late 1960s and early 1970s. He won a silver medal in the four-man event at the 1968 Winter Olympics in Grenoble and finished eighth in the two-man event at the 1972 Winter Olympics in Sapporo.

Gruber also won a bronze medal in the two-man event at the 1971 FIBT World Championships in Cervinia.
