= Max Kaltenberger =

Austrian bobsledder

Personal information
- Nationality: Austrian
- Born: 8 February 1941 (age 84); Vienna, Nazi Germany

Sport
- Sport: Bobsleigh

Max Kaltenberger (born 8 February 1941) is an Austrian bobsledder. He competed in the two-man event at the 1968 Winter Olympics.
