= Roberto Zandonella =

Italian bobsledder (born 1944)

Medal record

Bobsleigh

Olympic Games
Gold medal – first place	1968 Grenoble	Four-man

World Championships
Gold medal – first place	1970 St. Moritz	Four-man
Silver medal – second place	1969 Lake Placid	Four-man

Roberto Zandonella (born 14 April 1944) is an Italian bobsledder who competed in the late 1960s and early 1970s. He won a gold medal in the four-man event at the 1968 Winter Olympics in Grenoble.

Zandonella also won two medals in the four-man event at the FIBT World Championships with a gold in 1970 and a silver in 1969.
