= Josef Eder =

Austrian bobsledder (born 1942)

Olympic medal record

Bobsleigh
Silver medal – second place	1968 Grenoble	Four-man

Josef Eder (born 2 May 1942) is an Austrian bobsledder who competed in the late 1960s. He won a silver medal in the four-man event at the 1968 Winter Olympics in Grenoble.
