= Jean Wicki =

Swiss bobsledder (1933–2023)

Medal record

Men's bobsleigh

Representing Switzerland

Olympic Games
Gold medal – first place	1972 Sapporo	Four-man
Bronze medal – third place	1968 Grenoble	Four-man
Bronze medal – third place	1972 Sapporo	Two-man

European Championships
Gold medal – first place	1968 St. Moritz	Four-man

Jean Roland Wicki (18 June 1933 – 11 June 2023) was a Swiss bobsledder who competed in the late 1960s and early 1970s. Competing in two Winter Olympics, he won three medals with one gold (Four-man: 1972) and two bronzes (Two-man: 1972, Four-man: 1968). He announced his retirement from the sport in February 1972.

Wicki died on 11 June 2023 at the age of 89.

== Sources ==
- Bobsleigh two-man Olympic medalists 1932-56 and since 1964
- Bobsleigh four-man Olympic medalists for 1924, 1932-56, and since 1964
- DatabaseOlympics.com profile
- Death announcement
