= José Manuel Pérez (bobsleigh) =

Spanish bobsledder

Personal information
- Full name: José Manuel Pérez de Vega
- Born: 10 May 1947 (age 79) Valencia, Spain

Sport
- Sport: Bobsleigh
Medal record
Men's bobsleigh
Representing Spain
European Championships
Silver medal – second place	1970 Cortina d'Ampezzo	Four-man

José Manuel Pérez de Vega (Note: In this Spanish name, the first or paternal surname is Pérez and the second or maternal family name is Vega.) (born 10 May 1947) is a Spanish bobsledder. He competed in the two-man and the four-man events at the 1968 Winter Olympics.
