= Gianfranco Gaspari =

Italian bobsledder (born 1938)

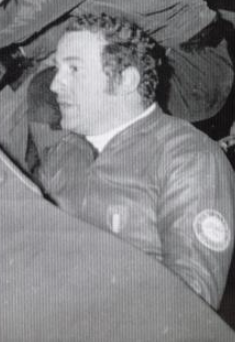
- Gaspari in 1970

Medal record

Men's bobsleigh

Representing Italy

World Championships
Gold medal – first place	1971 Cervinia	Two-man
Silver medal – second place	1966 Cortina d'Ampezzo	Two-man
Silver medal – second place	1969 Lake Placid	Four-man
Bronze medal – third place	1969 Lake Placid	Two-man

European Championships
Gold medal – first place	1970 Cortina d'Ampezzo	Two-man

Gianfranco Gaspari (born 5 August 1938) is an Italian bobsledder who competed from the late 1960s to the early 1970s. He won four medals at the FIBT World Championships with one gold (two-man: 1971), two silvers (two-man: 1966, four-man: 1969), and one bronze (two-man: 1969).

Gaspari finished 21 seconds behind fellow Italian bobsledder Eugenio Monti in the two-man event at the 1966 FIBT World Championships in Cortina d'Ampezzo.

Competing in two Winter Olympics, his best finish was fourth in the two-man event at Sapporo in 1972.
