= Luciano de Paolis =

Italian bobsledder (born 1941)

Medal record

Men's Bobsleigh

Representing Italy

Olympic Games
Gold medal – first place	1968 Grenoble	Two-man
Gold medal – first place	1968 Grenoble	Four-man

World Championships
Gold medal – first place	1970 St. Moritz	Four-man

Luciano de Paolis (born 14 June 1941 in Rome) is an Italian bobsledder who competed in the late 1960s. At the 1968 Winter Olympics in Grenoble, he won gold medals in the two-man and four-man events.

== Biography ==
De Paolis also won a gold medal in the four-man event at the 1970 FIBT World Championships in St. Moritz.

Winter Olympics
Preceded by Bruno Alberti	Flag bearer for Italy; 1972 Sapporo	Succeeded by Gustav Thöni
