= Hans Candrian =

Swiss bobsledder (1938–1999)

Medal record

Men's bobsleigh

Representing Switzerland

Olympic Games
Bronze medal – third place	1968 Grenoble	Four-man

World Championships
Silver medal – second place	1973 Lake Placid	Two-man
Silver medal – second place	1974 St. Moritz	Four-man
Bronze medal – third place	1970 St. Moritz	Two-man
Bronze medal – third place	1970 St. Moritz	Four-man

European Championships
Gold medal – first place	1968 St. Moritz	Four-man

Hans Candrian (6 March 1938 – 9 January 1999) was a Swiss bobsledder who competed in the late 1960s and early 1970s. Competing in two Winter Olympics, he won a bronze medal in the four-man event at Grenoble in 1968. Candrian also won four medals at the FIBT World Championships with four silver (Two-man: 1973, Four-man: 1974) and two bronzes (Two-man and four-man: both 1970).
