= Mario Armano =

Italian bobsledder (born 1946)

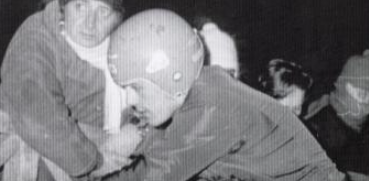
- Armano in 1970

Medal record

Men's bobsleigh

Representing Italy

Olympic Games
Gold medal – first place	1968 Grenoble	Four-man

World Championships
Gold medal – first place	1970 St. Moritz	Four-man
Gold medal – first place	1971 Cervinia	Two-man
Silver medal – second place	1969 Lake Placid	Four-man
Bronze medal – third place	1969 Lake Placid	Two-man

European Championships
Gold medal – first place	1970 Cortina d'Ampezzo	Two-man

Mario Armano (born 25 July 1946) is a retired Italian bobsledder who competed in the late 1960s and early 1970s. Competing in two Winter Olympics, he won a gold medal in the four-man event at Grenoble in 1968.

Armano also won four medals at the FIBT World Championships with two golds (Two-man: 1971, Four-man: 1970), one silver (Four-man: 1969), and one bronze (Two-man: 1969).
