= Canada at the 1968 Winter Olympics =

- IOC code: CAN
- NOC: Canadian Olympic Committee
- Website: www.olympic.ca (in English and French)

in Grenoble, France 6 February 1968 – 18 February 1968
- Competitors: 70 (55 men, 15 women) in 9 sports
- Flag bearer: Nancy Greene (alpine skiing)
- Medals Ranked 13th: Gold 1 Silver 1 Bronze 1 Total 3

Winter Olympics appearances (overview)
- 1924; 1928; 1932; 1936; 1948; 1952; 1956; 1960; 1964; 1968; 1972; 1976; 1980; 1984; 1988; 1992; 1994; 1998; 2002; 2006; 2010; 2014; 2018; 2022; 2026

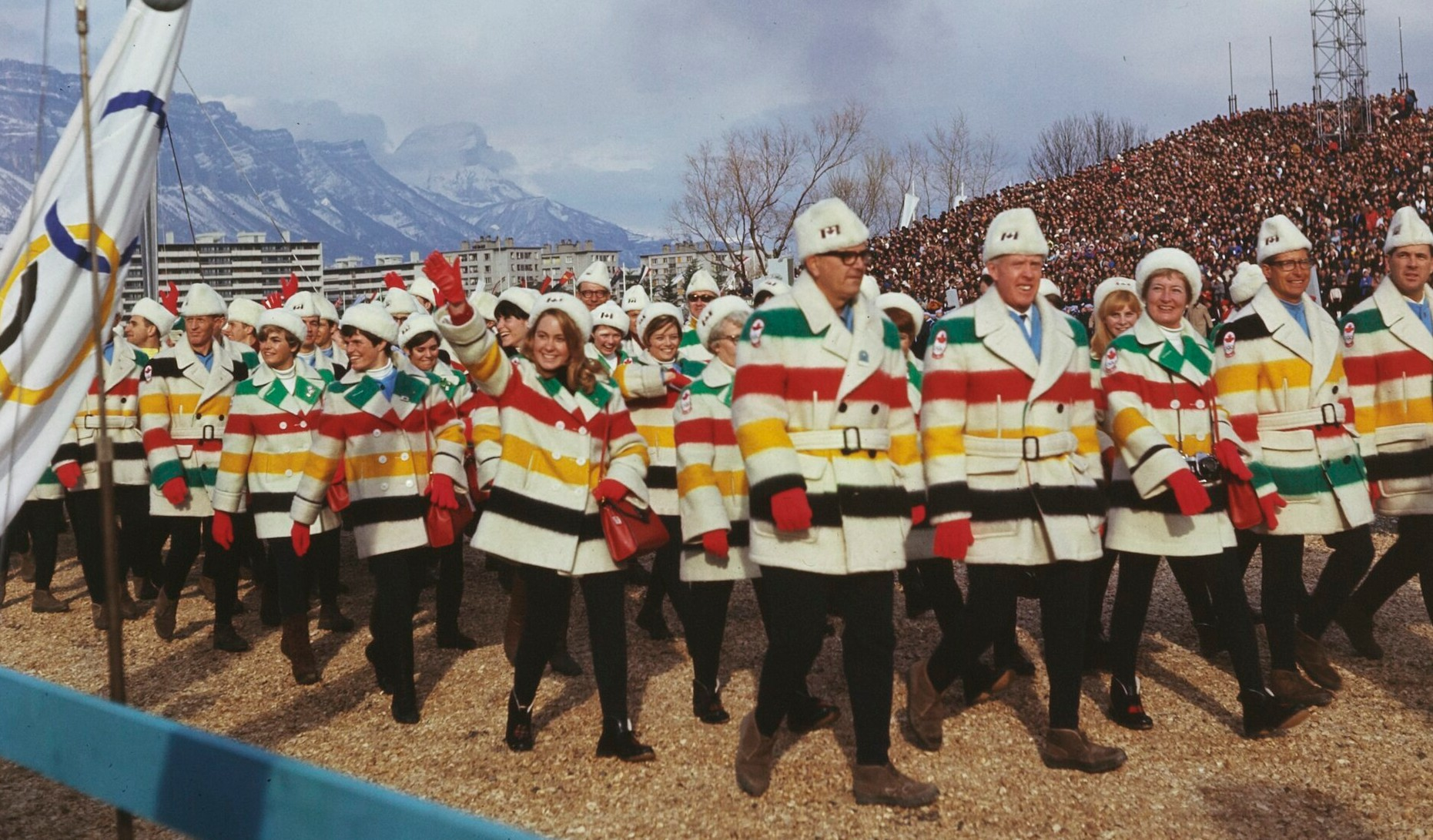
The Canadian team during the opening ceremony, wearing Hudson's Bay point blanket coats featuring Hudson's Bay stripes

Canada competed at the 1968 Winter Olympics in Grenoble, France. Canada has competed at every Winter Olympic Games. This was the first Winter Olympic Games in which the new Maple Leaf Flag was used to represent the country.

== Medalists ==
Medal	Name	Sport	Event
Gold	Nancy Greene	Alpine skiing	Women's giant slalom
Silver	Nancy Greene	Alpine skiing	Women's slalom
Bronze	Canada men's national ice hockey team: Roger Bourbonnais; Ken Broderick; Ray Cadieux; Paul Conlin; Gary Dineen; Brian Glennie; Ted Hargreaves; Fran Huck; Marshall Johnston; Barry MacKenzie; Bill MacMillan; Steve Monteith; Morris Mott; Terry O'Malley; Danny O'Shea; Gerry Pinder; Herb Pinder; Wayne Stephenson	Ice hockey	Men's competition

== Alpine skiing ==
Men

Athlete	Event	Race 1		Race 2		Total	
Athlete	Event	Time	Rank	Time	Rank	Time	Rank
Peter Duncan	Downhill					DSQ	–
Rod Hebron	Downhill					DNF	–
Gerry Rinaldi	Downhill					2:06.30	31
Wayne Henderson	Downhill					2:05.56	27
Keith Shepherd	Giant Slalom	DSQ	–	–	–	DSQ	–
Scott Henderson	Giant Slalom	1:47.85	25	1:50.65	19	3:38.50	21
Rod Hebron	Giant Slalom	1:47.07	19	DNF	–	DNF	–
Peter Duncan	Giant Slalom	1:47.06	18	1:51.11	26	3:38.17	18

Men's slalom

Athlete	Heat 1		Heat 2		Final					
Athlete	Time	Rank	Time	Rank	Time 1	Rank	Time 2	Rank	Total	Rank
Scott Henderson	DSQ	–	56.71	3	did not advance					
Peter Duncan	54.57	3	55.07	2	did not advance					
Robert Swan	53.50	2 QF	–	–	53.75	34	DSQ	–	DSQ	–
Rod Hebron	56.12	4	54.52	1 QF	DNF	–	–	–	DNF	–

Women

Athlete	Event	Race 1		Race 2		Total	
Athlete	Event	Time	Rank	Time	Rank	Time	Rank
Betsy Clifford	Downhill					1:47.60	23
Karen Dokka	Downhill					1:47.55	22
Judi Leinweber	Downhill					1:45.60	20
Nancy Greene	Downhill					1:43.12	10
Betsy Clifford	Giant Slalom					DSQ	–
Judi Leinweber	Giant Slalom					2:00.57	25
Karen Dokka	Giant Slalom					1:58.36	16
Nancy Greene	Giant Slalom					1:51.97	1st place, gold medalist(s)
Betsy Clifford	Slalom	DNF	–	–	–	DNF	–
Judi Leinweber	Slalom	DSQ	–	–	–	DSQ	–
Karen Dokka	Slalom	44.92	20	49.59	15	1:34.51	15
Nancy Greene	Slalom	41.45	3	44.70	1	1:26.15	2nd place, silver medalist(s)

== Biathlon ==
Men

Event	Athlete	Time	Penalties	Adjusted time ^{1}	Rank
20 km	George Rattai	1'24:03.0	11	1'35:03.0	54
20 km	James Boyde	1'27:02.0	8	1'35:02.0	53
20 km	George Ede	1'26:41.8	8	1'34:41.8	51
20 km	Esko Karu	1'21:42.9	11	1'32:42.9	46

^{1} One minute added per close miss (a hit in the outer ring), two minutes added per complete miss.

Men's 4 x 7.5 km relay

Athletes	Race		
Athletes	Misses ^{2}	Time	Rank
George Ede; Knowles McGill; George Rattai; Esko Karu	–	DNF	–

^{2} A penalty loop of 200 metres had to be skied per missed target.

== Bobsleigh ==
Sled	Athletes	Event	Run 1		Run 2		Run 3		Run 4		Total	
Sled	Athletes	Event	Time	Rank	Time	Rank	Time	Rank	Time	Rank	Time	Rank
CAN-1	Purvis McDougall; Bob Storey	Two-man	1:13.89	20	1:12.80	17	1:13.68	18	1:13.73	19	4:54.10	19
CAN-2	Hans Gehrig; Harry Goetschi	Two-man	DSQ	–	–	–	–	–	–	–	DSQ	–

Sled	Athletes	Event	Run 1		Run 2		Total	
Sled	Athletes	Event	Time	Rank	Time	Rank	Time	Rank
CAN-1	Purvis McDougall; Bob Storey; Michael Young; Andrew Faulds	Four-man	1:12.61	17	1:10.21	17	2:22.82	17

== Cross-country skiing ==
Men

Event	Athlete	Race	
Event	Athlete	Time	Rank
15 km	Rolf Pettersen	58:31.8	63
15 km	David Rees	58:25.9	61
15 km	Nils Skulbru	55:53.4	56
30 km	Rolf Pettersen	1'55:37.2	61
30 km	David Rees	1'52:46.6	58
30 km	Nils Skulbru	1'50:06.1	52
50 km	David Rees	2'56:00.5	46

Men's 4 × 10 km relay

Athletes	Race	
Athletes	Time	Rank
Nils Skulbru; Rolf Pettersen; Esko Karu; David Rees	2'29:12.7	14

== Figure skating ==
Men

Athlete	CF	FS	Points	Places	Rank
Steve Hutchinson	22	21	1578.3	193	22
David McGillivray	21	9	1663.7	139	16
Jay Humphry	9	6	1795.0	63	7

Women

Athlete	CF	FS	Points	Places	Rank
Lyndai Cowan	23	DNF	–	–	DNF
Linda Carbonetto	24	9	1662.9	111	13
Karen Magnussen	10	4	1759.4	63	7

Pairs

Athletes	SP	FS	Points	Places	Rank
Betty McKilligan; John McKilligan	17	17	254.8	154	17
Anna Forder; Richard Stephens	16	16	269.2	138	16

== Ice hockey ==
=== Medal Round ===
Rank	Team	Pld	W	L	T	GF	GA	Pts
1	Soviet Union	7	6	1	0	48	10	12
2	Czechoslovakia	7	5	1	1	33	17	11
3	Canada (bronze)	7	5	2	0	28	15	10
4	Sweden	7	4	2	1	23	18	9
5	Finland	7	3	3	1	17	23	7
6	United States	7	2	4	1	23	28	5
7	West Germany	7	1	6	0	13	39	2
8	East Germany	7	0	7	0	13	48	0

Canada – West Germany 6:1 (0:0, 4:1, 2:0)
Goalscorers: Bourbonnais 2, Cadieux, Dinnen, Mott, Huck – Kopf.
Referees: Seglin, Snětkov (URS)

Canada – Finland 2:5 (1:2, 0:1, 1:2)
Goalscorers: O'Shea, McMillan – Keinonen, Oksanen, J. Peltonen, Koskela, Wahlsten.
Referees: Trumble (USA), Seglin (URS)

Canada – East Germany 11:0 (4:0, 4:0, 3:0)
Goalscorers: Mott 4, Huck 2, Hargreaves, O'Shea, Bourbonnais, Monteith, H. Pinder.
Referees: Trumble (USA), Sillankorva (FIN)

Canada – (United States) USA 3:2 (1:2, 0:0, 2:0)
Goalscorers: Cadieux 2, Johnston – Pleau, Riutta.
Referees: Snětkov, Seglin (URS)

Czechoslovakia – Canada 2:3 (0:0, 0:3, 2:0)
Goalscorers: Havel, Nedomanský – Huck, Bourbonnais, Cadieux.
Referees: Trumble (USA), Sillankorva (FIN)

Sweden – Canada 0:3 (0:2, 0.0, 0:1)
Goalscorers: Johnston, G. Pinder, O'Shea.
Referees: Sillankorva (FIN), Kořínek (TCH)

(Soviet Union) USSR – Canada 5:0 (1:0, 1:0, 3:0)
Goalscorers: Firsov 2, Mišakov, Staršinov, Zimin.
Referees: Trumble (USA), Dahlberg (SWE)

=== Leading scorers/Awards ===
Rk	Team	GP	G	A	Pts
6th	(Canada) Fran Huck	7	4	5	9
8th	(Canada) Marshall Johnston	7	2	6	8

IIHF Award:

Best Goaltender	(Canada) Ken Broderick

=== Contestants ===
(bronze) CANADA
Goaltenders: Ken Broderick, Wayne Stephenson.
Defence: Marshall Johnston, Terry O'Malley, Barry MacKenzie, Brian Glennie, Paul Conlin.
Forwards: Fran Huck, Morris Mott, Ray Cadieux, Roger Bourbonnais, Danny O'Shea, Bill MacMillan, Gary Dineen, Ted Hargreaves, Herb Pinder, Steve Monteith, Gerry Pinder.
Coach: Jackie McLeod.

== Luge ==
Men

Athlete	Run 1		Run 2		Run 3		Total	
Athlete	Time	Rank	Time	Rank	Time	Rank	Time	Rank
D'Arcy Coulson	1:02.69	39	1:31.24	47	1:02.19	42	3:36.12	47
Colin Nelson	1:01.13	37	1:01.90	38	1:01.53	38	3:04.56	37
Roger Eddy	1:00.69	33	1:00.30	30	1:00.40	32	3:01.39	31
Larry Arbuthnot	1:00.10	30	1:00.92	33	1:01.99	41	3:03.01	33

Women

Athlete	Run 1		Run 2		Run 3		Total	
Athlete	Time	Rank	Time	Rank	Time	Rank	Time	Rank
Phyllis Walter	DSQ	–	–	–	–	–	DSQ	–
Martha Diplock	51.94	19	51.51	18	52.03	16	2:35.48	18
Linda Crutchfield-Bocock	50.64	13	50.54	13	51.28	11	2:32.46	12

== Ski jumping ==
Athlete	Event	Jump 1		Jump 2		Total	
Athlete	Event	Distance	Points	Distance	Points	Points	Rank
Claude Trahan	Normal hill	61.5	74.2	56.0	56.4	130.6	57
Ulf Kvendbo	Normal hill	61.5	75.2	63.0	78.1	153.3	53
John McInnes	Normal hill	61.5	75.7	60.5	72.6	148.3	55
Claude Trahan	Large hill	64.0	40.0	69.0	51.0	91.0	58
John McInnes	Large hill	71.5	58.5	73.5	61.8	120.3	57
Ulf Kvendbo	Large hill	76.5	69.5	77.0	69.2	138.7	55

== Speed skating ==
Men

Event	Athlete	Race	
Event	Athlete	Time	Rank
500 m	Bob Hodges	43.3	41
500 m	Pete Williamson	42.6	33
500 m	Bob Boucher	42.0	25
1500 m	Pete Williamson	2:16.0	46
1500 m	Bob Hodges	2:12.0	26
5000 m	Bob Hodges	8:05.0	29
5000 m	Paul Enock	7:54.8	19
10,000 m	Bob Hodges	17:01.9	23
10,000 m	Paul Enock	16:21.2	15

Women

Event	Athlete	Race	
Event	Athlete	Time	Rank
500 m	Doreen McCannell	49.0	24
500 m	Marcia Parsons	48.8	23
500 m	Wendy Thompson	48.2	19
1000 m	Wendy Thompson	1:41.1	27
1000 m	Marcia Parsons	1:37.7	21
1000 m	Doreen McCannell	1:37.6	20
1500 m	Marcia Parsons	2:34.4	24
1500 m	Doreen McCannell	2:32.2	21
3000 m	Marcia Parsons	5:29.5	22
3000 m	Doreen McCannell	5:21.5	18

== Official Outfitter ==
HBC was the official outfitter of clothing for members of the Canadian Olympic team. It was HBC last Olympics until 2006.
