= Hextall =

Hextall is a surname. Notable people with the surname include:

- Brett Hextall (born 1988), American ice hockey player, son of Ron
- Bryan Hextall (1913–1984), Canadian ice hockey player
- Bryan Hextall Jr. (born 1941), Canadian ice hockey player, son of Bryan Sr.
- Dennis Hextall (born 1943), Canadian ice hockey player, son of Bryan Sr.
- John Hextall (1861–1914), Canadian settler
- Leah Hextall (born c. 1981), Canadian sports journalist
- Ron Hextall (born 1964), Canadian ice hockey player, son of Bryan Jr.

== Other uses ==
- The Hextalls, a Canadian pop punk band.
