= 1967–68 Canada men's national ice hockey team =

The 1967–68 Canada men's national ice hockey team represented Canada and won the bronze medal at the 1968 Winter Olympics held in Grenoble, France. This tournament also counted as the IIHF World Championships and the IIHF European Championships. The matches were played at the Palais des Sports.

This was the last men's ice hockey team to compete for Canada at the Olympics until the 1980 Winter Olympics held in Lake Placid.

== History ==
In 1965 a permanent national team was established in Winnipeg, Manitoba. The team was coached by Jackie MacLeod and managed by Father David Bauer.

Due to disagreements with the IIHF over the use of professional athletes at world championships, Canada completely withdrew from international amateur hockey and did not send teams to the 1972 or 1976 Winter Olympics.

=== 1968 Winter Olympics ===
Official roster for the 1968 Winter Olympics:

- Head coach: Jackie McLeod
- Roger Bourbonnais
- Kenneth Broderick
- Raymond Cadieux
- Paul Conlin
- Gary Dineen
- Brian Glennie
- Ted Hargreaves
- Francis Huck
- Larry Johnston (C)
- John McKenzie
- William MacMillan
- Stephen Monteith
- Morris Mott
- Terrence O'Malley
- Daniel O'Shea
- Gerald Pinder
- Herb Pinder
- Wayne Stephenson

== See also ==
- Canada men's national ice hockey team
- Ice hockey at the 1968 Winter Olympics
- Ice hockey at the Olympic Games
- List of Canadian national ice hockey team rosters

Preceded by 1963–64 Canada men's national ice hockey team	Canada men's Olympic ice hockey team 1968	Succeeded by 1979–80 Canada men's national ice hockey team
