= 1967 World Allround Speed Skating Championships for women =

International speed skating competition

1967 World Allround Speed Skating Championships for Women
- Venue: IJsselstadion, Deventer, Netherlands
- Dates: 18–19 February
- Competitors: 33 from 12 nations

Medalist women
| 1st place, gold medalist(s) | | Stien Kaiser | NED |
| 2nd place, silver medalist(s) | | Lāsma Kauniste | SOV |
| 3rd place, bronze medalist(s) | | Dianne Holum | USA |

The 28th edition of the World Allround Speed Skating Championships for Women took place on 18 and 19 February 1967 in Deventer at the IJsselstadion ice rink.

Title holder was Valentina Stenina from the Soviet Union.

== Distance medalists ==
| Event | Gold (gold) | Silver (silver) | Bronze (bronze) |
|---|---|---|---|
| 500m | Mary Meyers | Irina Yegorova; Dianne Holum | |
| 1500m | Stien Kaiser | Lidiya Skoblikova | Kaija Mustonen |
| 1000m | Stien Kaiser | Kim Song-soon | Dianne Holum |
| 3000m | Stien Kaiser | Ans Schut | Kaija Mustonen |

== Classification ==
| Rank | Skater | Country | Points Samalog | 500m | 1500m | 1000m | 3000m |
|---|---|---|---|---|---|---|---|
| 1st place, gold medalist(s) | Stien Kaiser | Netherlands | 195.384 | 46.5 (4) | 2:23.0 (gold) | 1:36.2 (gold) | 5:18.7 (gold) |
| 2nd place, silver medalist(s) | Lāsma Kauniste | Soviet Union | 199.584 | 46.6 (5) | 2:26.3 (4) | 1:38.3 (4) | 5:30.4 (5) |
| 3rd place, bronze medalist(s) | Dianne Holum | United States | 199.600 | 46.1 (2) | 2:26.4 (5) | 1:37.5 (3) | 5:35.7 (9) |
| 4 | Lidiya Skoblikova | Soviet Union | 199.784 | 46.8 (6) | 2:23.9 (2) | 1:39.4 (8) | 5:31.9 (7) |
| 5 | Ans Schut | Netherlands | 199.917 | 48.0 (14) | 2:26.7 (6) | 1:39.1 (6) | 5:20.8 (2) |
| 6 | Valentina Stenina | Soviet Union | 201.200 | 46.9 (7) | 2:27.4 (8) | 1:40.1 (11) | 5:30.7 (6) |
| 7 | Irina Yegorova | Soviet Union | 201.933 | 46.1 (2) | 2:29.7 (11) | 1:38.3 (4) | 5:40.7 (12) |
| 8 | Kaija Mustonen | Finland | 202.133 | 49.1 (28) | 2:26.2 (3) | 1:39.5 (9) | 5:27.3 (3) |
| 9 | Kim Song-soon | North Korea | 202.567 | 48.0 (14) | 2:27.8 (2) | 1:37.1 (2) | 5:40.5 (11) |
| 10 | Wil Burgmeijer | Netherlands | 202.633 | 47.4 (13) | 2:30.1 (13) | 1:39.1 (6) | 5:33.9 (8) |
| 11 | Han Pil-hwa | North Korea | 204.950 | 48.1 (17) | 2:29.9 (12) | 1:41.4 (15) | 5:37.1 (10) |
| 12 | Carry Geijssen | Netherlands | 205.017 | 48.2 (19) | 2:26.7 (6) | 1:46.1 * (30) | 5:29.2 (4) |
| 13 | Mary Meyers | United States | 205.516 | 46.0 (gold) | 2:30.4 (16) | 1:39.6 (10) | 5:27.5 (16) |
| 14 | Kaija-Liisa Keskivitikka | Finland | 206.750 | 48.7 (24) | 2:30.2 (14) | 1:40.4 (13) | 5:46.7 (14) |
| 15 | Anna Sablina | Soviet Union | 207.000 | 49.2 (30) | 2:29.4 (10) | 1:40.6 (14) | 5:46.2 (13) |
| 16 | Martine Ivangine | France | 207.634 | 47.6 (10) | 2:30.2 (14) | 1:43.2 (23) | 5:50.2 (15) |
| NC17 | Sigrid Sundby | Norway | 147.833 | 47.6 (10) | 2:30.4 (16) | 1:40.2 (12) | – |
| NC18 | Sachiko Saito | Japan | 149.217 | 46.9 (7) | 2:33.5 (25) | 1:42.3 (17) | – |
| NC19 | Lisbeth Berg | Norway | 149.333 | 47.8 (13) | 2:31.0 (18) | 1:42.4 (18) | – |
| NC20 | Adelajda Mroske | Poland | 150.550 | 48.0 (14) | 2:33.0 (24) | 1:43.1 (22) | – |
| NC21 | Herlind Hürdler | East Germany | 150.933 | 48.7 (24) | 2:31.9 (20) | 1:43.2 (23) | – |
| NC22 | Rita Schmidt | East Germany | 151.000 | 47.7 (12) | 2:36.0 (28) | 1:42.6 (19) | – |
| NC23 | Christina Lindblom-Scherling | Sweden | 151.100 | 48.3 (21) | 2:32.1 (22) | 1:44.2 (27) | – |
| NC24 | Tuula Vilkas | Finland | 151.217 | 49.0 (27) | 2:31.7 (19) | 1:43.3 (25) | – |
| NC25 | Akiko Aruga | Japan | 151.383 | 48.8 (26) | 2:31.9 (20) | 1:43.9 (26) | – |
| NC26 | Doreen McCannell | Canada | 151.583 | 48.2 (19) | 2:32.2 (23) | 1:45.3 (29) | – |
| NC27 | Ruth Schleiermacher | East Germany | 151.700 | 48.4 (22) | 2:36.6 (29) | 1:42.2 (16) | – |
| NC28 | Ylva Hedlund | Sweden | 151.800 | 49.1 (28) | 2:33.6 (26) | 1:43.0 (21) | – |
| NC29 | Ko Kyung-hi | North Korea | 152.000 | 48.5 (23) | 2:36.6 (29) | 1:42.6 (19) | – |
| NC30 | Marianna Kaim | Poland | 152.167 | 48.1 (17) | 2:34.4 (27) | 1:45.2 (28) | – |
| NC31 | Patricia Demartini | France | 166.850 | 53.7 (32) | 2:45.0 (32) | 1:56.3 (32) | – |
| NC32 | Wendy Thompson | Canada | 169.200 | 1:01.1 * (33) | 2:45.0 (32) | 1:46.2 (31) | – |
| NC | Ko Kwang-za | North Korea | 103.300 | 49.4 (31) | 2:41.7 (31) | DNS | – |

* = Fell
DNS = Did not start

== Attribution ==
In Dutch
