= 1963–64 Canada men's national ice hockey team =

The 1963–64 Canada men's national ice hockey team represented Canada at the 1964 Winter Olympics held in Innsbruck, Austria. The matches were played in the Olympiahalle Innsbruck.

For the first time in Canadian Olympic hockey history, the nation was represented by a national team rather than a club team.

The 1964 Olympic tournament also counted as IIHF World Championship and IIHF European Championship. The Canadian team was awarded a "world championship" bronze medal, but, because of different rules for eliminating ties for Olympics and World Championships Team Canada finished in 4th place in the Olympic standings.

== History ==
The idea of a national team was the brainchild of Father David Bauer who in 1962 successfully presented the concept to the Canadian Amateur Hockey Association (CAHA).

Bauer, who was then with St. Mark's College and the University of British Columbia, put together the Canadian team, which included Brian Conacher, Roger Bourbonnais, Marshall Johnston, and goaltender Seth Martin who had won the world championship with the Trail Smoke Eaters in 1961. Martin had the most international experience on the team and was also the oldest player at 31. Bauer's team was considered strong on defence, but short on goal scoring.

This national team participated in the 1964 Winter Olympics in Innsbruck, Austria. Team Canada performed well and finished the tournament with five wins and two losses, but lost 3–2 to the Soviet Union for the opportunity to play in the gold medal game. This placed Canada in a three-way tie with Czechoslovakia and Sweden for second place in the tournament. Based on goal differential, Canada was placed third in the World Championships behind the Sweden, with Czechoslovakia in fourth. Olympic officials calculated the standing on different tie-breaking rules that based the goal differential over the entire tournament – not just among teams involved in the medal round. The Olympic decision dropped Canada to fourth place and out of the medals for the first time in Olympic hockey history.

=== 1964 Winter Olympics roster ===
- Head coach: David Bauer
- General Manager and Assistant Coach - Bob Hindmarch
- Hank Akervall (C)
- Gary Begg
- Roger Bourbonnais
- Ken Broderick
- Ray Cadieux
- Terry Clancy
- Brian Conacher
- Paul Conlin
- Gary Dineen
- Bob Forhan
- Marshall Johnston
- Seth Martin
- Barry MacKenzie
- Terry O'Malley
- Rod Seiling
- George Swarbrick

== See also ==
- Canada men's national ice hockey team
- Ice hockey at the 1964 Winter Olympics
- Ice hockey at the Olympic Games
- List of Canadian national ice hockey team rosters

Preceded by Kitchener-Waterloo Dutchmen	Canada men's Olympic ice hockey team 1964	Succeeded by 1967–68 Canada men's national ice hockey team
