= Mary Berger =

Mary Berger may refer to:

- Mary Odilia Berger (1823–1880), German-American religious leader, founded Sisters of St. Mary
- Mary Berger (speed skater) (1946–2024), American speed skater
