= Dan Maloney =

Canadian ice hockey player and coach (1950–2018)

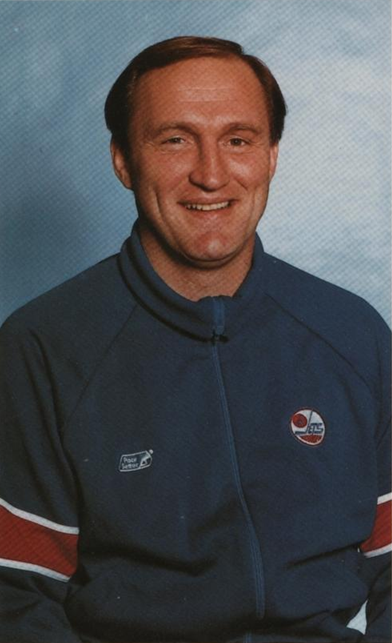
- Maloney in 1988 card as coach of the Winnipeg Jets
- Born: September 24, 1950 Barrie, Ontario, Canada
- Died: November 19, 2018 (aged 68) Barrie, Ontario, Canada
- Height: 6 ft 1 in (185 cm)
- Weight: 195 lb (88 kg; 13 st 13 lb)
- Position: Left wing
- Shot: Left
- Played for: Chicago Black Hawks; Los Angeles Kings; Detroit Red Wings; Toronto Maple Leafs
- NHL draft: 14th overall, 1970; Chicago Black Hawks
- Playing career: 1970–1982

Daniel Charles "Snowshoes" Maloney (September 24, 1950 – November 19, 2018) was a Canadian professional ice hockey left winger in the National Hockey League (NHL) and NHL coach. He featured in the 1971 Stanley Cup Final with the Chicago Blackhawks.

He coached the Toronto Maple Leafs from 1984 to 1986 and the Winnipeg Jets from 1986 to 1989.

== Playing career ==
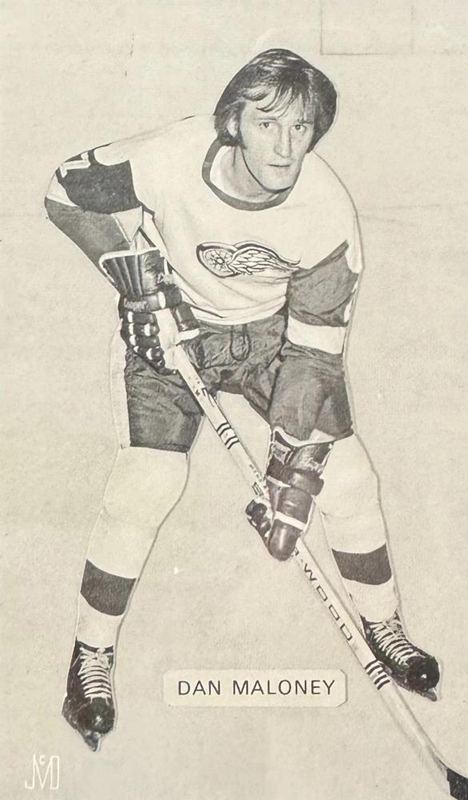
Mid 1970s postcard of Maloney for Detroit Red Wings

Drafted 14th overall by the Chicago Black Hawks in the 1970 NHL entry draft, Maloney played two seasons for the Black Hawks and later played for the Los Angeles Kings, Detroit Red Wings and Toronto Maple Leafs tallying 192 goals, 259 assists and 451 points in 737 games over the course of his playing career. Upon retiring as a player he was offered an assistant coach position with the Maple Leafs in 1982, and promoted to head coach in 1984. He coached two seasons with the Leafs, then coached three more years as head coach of the Winnipeg Jets.

Maloney is known as having had one of the hardest right-hand punches in his day, and is considered by many hockey fans to have been the greatest fighter (along with the Flyers' Dave Schultz) in NHL history. The two finally squared off in a fight in a game in Los Angeles on January 4, 1975, with Maloney considered the winner. But Maloney was more than a fighter, as he tallied 27 goals in back to back seasons (1974–75 and 1975–76). Maloney was part of the trade that sent Marcel Dionne from Detroit to the Los Angeles Kings. Schultz was traded to the Kings a year later to replace Maloney as their enforcer.

As a member of the Red Wings, he was the third NHL player to be charged by local authorities with a crime resulting from action on the ice. In the second period of a 7–3 loss to Toronto at Maple Leaf Gardens on November 5, 1975, Maloney came to the defense of teammate Bryan Hextall by attacking the Maple Leafs' Brian Glennie from behind, flattening him with a right‐hand punch, hitting him several more times and repeatedly lifting and dropping him, face first, to the ice. Glennie sustained a mild concussion. Despite Glennie's hit on Hextall being described by The Associated Press as "a clean check", Maloney claimed the force of the contact was excessive and that he had no intention of injuring him. He was charged with assault by Attorney General of Ontario Roy McMurtry the following day on November 6, but was acquitted just under eight months later on June 30, 1976.

== Personal life ==
During his time with the Red Wings, Maloney lived year-round in Detroit area (Southfield, Michigan). Maloney's nephew, Trenton Bourque, was drafted by the St. Louis Blues in 2017.

In his later years Maloney lived in the Barrie or Orillia, Ontario, area. Maloney died on November 19, 2018, after a period of declining health; he was 68. He would posthumously be diagnosed with chronic traumatic encephalopathy (CTE).

== Career statistics ==
			Regular season					Playoffs
Season	Team	League	GP	G	A	Pts	PIM	GP	G	A	Pts	PIM
1967–68	Markham Seal-a-Wax	MetJHL	—	—	—	—	—	—	—	—	—	—
1968–69	London Knights	OHA-Jr.	53	12	28	40	62	6	2	1	3	16
1969–70	London Knights	OHA-Jr.	54	31	35	66	232	11	1	3	4	66
1970–71	Chicago Black Hawks	NHL	74	12	14	26	174	10	0	1	1	8
1971–72	Dallas Black Hawks	CHL	72	25	45	70	161	12	4	5	9	44
1972–73	Chicago Black Hawks	NHL	57	13	17	30	63	—	—	—	—	—
1972–73	Los Angeles Kings	NHL	14	4	7	11	18	—	—	—	—	—
1973–74	Los Angeles Kings	NHL	65	15	17	32	113	5	0	0	0	2
1974–75	Los Angeles Kings	NHL	80	27	39	66	165	3	0	0	0	2
1975–76	Detroit Red Wings	NHL	77	27	39	66	203	—	—	—	—	—
1976–77	Detroit Red Wings	NHL	34	13	13	26	64	—	—	—	—	—
1977–78	Detroit Red Wings	NHL	68	16	29	45	151	—	—	—	—	—
1977–78	Toronto Maple Leafs	NHL	13	3	4	7	25	13	1	3	4	17
1978–79	Toronto Maple Leafs	NHL	77	17	36	53	157	6	3	3	6	2
1979–80	Toronto Maple Leafs	NHL	71	17	16	33	102	—	—	—	—	—
1980–81	Toronto Maple Leafs	NHL	65	20	21	41	183	3	0	0	0	4
1981–82	Toronto Maple Leafs	NHL	44	8	7	15	71	—	—	—	—	—
NHL totals			737	192	259	451	1,489	40	4	7	11	35

== Coaching record ==
Team	Year	Regular season						Postseason
Team	Year	G	W	L	T	Pts	Finish	Result
Toronto Maple Leafs	1984–85	80	20	52	8	48	5th in Norris	Missed playoffs
Toronto Maple Leafs	1985–86	80	25	48	7	57	4th in Norris	Won in division semi-finals (3-0 vs. CHI); Lost in division finals (3-4 vs. STL)
Winnipeg Jets	1986–87	80	40	32	8	88	3rd in Smythe	Won in division semi-finals (4-2 vs. CGY); Lost in division finals (0-4 vs. EDM)
Winnipeg Jets	1987–88	80	33	36	11	77	3rd in Smythe	Lost in division semi-finals (1-4 vs. EDM)
Winnipeg Jets	1988–89	52	18	25	9	(64)	5th in Smythe	Fired
Winnipeg Total		212	91	93	28	210		5-10 (0.333)
Toronto Total		160	45	100	15	105		6-4 (0.600)
Total		372	136	193	43	315		11-14 (0.440)

Preceded by J. P. Bordeleau	Chicago Blackhawks first-round draft pick 1970	Succeeded by Dan Spring
Preceded by Danny Grant	Detroit Red Wings captain 1977–78	Succeeded by Dennis Hextall
Preceded by John Ferguson Sr.	Head coach of the Winnipeg Jets; 1986–89	Succeeded by Rick Bowness
Preceded by Mike Nykoluk	Head coach of the Toronto Maple Leafs; 1984–86	Succeeded by John Brophy
