= Leah Hextall =

Canadian sports broadcaster and play-by-play announcer

- Born: 1978 or 1979 (age 46–47); Brandon, Manitoba, Canada
- Occupations: Sports journalist, play-by-play broadcaster
- Years active: 2003–present
- Relatives: Bryan Hextall (grandfather); Bryan Hextall Jr (uncle); Dennis Hextall (uncle); Ron Hextall (cousin)
- Website: www.leahhextall.com

Leah Hextall (born 1978 or 1979) is a Canadian sports journalist and ice hockey play-by-play broadcaster and reporter. In March 2020, she became the first woman to call play-by-play for a nationally televised NHL game as part of Sportsnet’s first all-female broadcast team. Hextall had previously made history as the first woman to call an NCAA Men's Ice Hockey Championship game, for ESPN at the 2019 tournament.

== Broadcast career ==
Hextall graduated from the Columbia Academy of Radio, Television and Recording Arts in Vancouver with a diploma in radio and television broadcasting in 2003. She worked for CTV Winnipeg from 2005 to 2012, and for the New England Sports Network (NESN) as host of NESN Sports Today from 2012 to 2014. In 2014, she joined Sportsnet as the studio host for regional Calgary Flames game broadcasts.

After being let go in 2016 amid larger organizational changes at Sportsnet, she became interested in expanding her skill set and, recognizing the dearth of women in play-by-play announcing in ice hockey, became invested in pursuing play-by-play. Encouraged by legendary NHL broadcaster Mike "Doc" Emrick and the first female colour commentator on Hockey Night in Canada, Cassie Campbell-Pascall, both of whom she had worked with while in previous hosting roles, she began refining her announcing skills. Her television debut calling play-by-play was a four-game set of Canadian Women's Hockey League (CWHL) games in January 2018. She returned to the role for the CWHL in January 2019, notably using the non-standard term "defencewoman" to refer to the defensive players. During that period, Hextall called games on the side, generally for free, including for the Brandon Wheat Kings of the Western Hockey League (WHL).

Hextall has a segment called "Hextall on Hockey," which airs weekly on the AM radio station 680 CJOB in Winnipeg and is rebroadcast by a number of stations across Canada. The under two-minute segments are united by the theme of ice hockey and, while the most frequent topic is the Winnipeg Jets, Hextall has used the segment to highlight issues within the hockey world, including sexism and other social injustices.

In May 2021, the New York Post reported ESPN had signed Hextall to the NHL on ESPN broadcast team as a play-by-play announcer and to "other posts" for the upcoming 2021–22 NHL season. The hiring, later confirmed by The Athletic, makes her "the first woman to hold [a play-by-play] role as part of a national TV broadcast." ESPN removed her from NHL play-by-play duties following the 2022-23 season, but kept her as a rinkside reporter for select games, mainly with the #2 team of Bob Wischusen and Ryan Callahan. However, she does do play-by-play announcing for the NCAA women's ice hockey tournament.

== Personal life ==
Hextall's grandfather, Bryan Hextall Sr., played 11 seasons in the National Hockey League and was named to the Hockey Hall of Fame in 1969. Her uncle Bryan Hextall Jr. played 10 seasons as a centerman, and her uncle Dennis Hextall played 12 seasons as a (ice hockey) center. Her cousin Ron Hextall played 13 years in the NHL as a goaltender, mostly for the Philadelphia Flyers, and won the Vezina Trophy in 1987. Ron is in the Flyers' Hall of Fame and later served as the general manager for the Flyers, as well as the Pittsburgh Penguins from 2021 to 2023.

Outside of hockey, Hextall hosted events at the Progressive Conservative Party of Manitoba Annual General Meeting in 2017 and served as a communications staffer for Brian Pallister's government in Manitoba between 2017 and 2020.

== See also ==
- List of NHL on Sportsnet commentators
