= Steve Hutchinson =

Steve Hutchinson may refer to:

- Steve Hutchinson (American football) (born 1977), National Football League offensive lineman
- Steve Hutchinson (figure skater) (born 1949), Canadian figure skater
