= Brett Hextall =

American ice hockey player (born 1988)

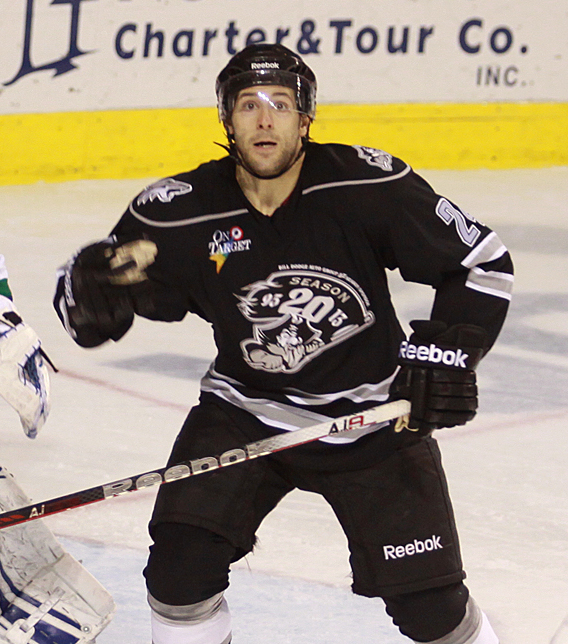
- Hextall with the Portland Pirates in 2012
- Born: April 2, 1988 (age 38) Philadelphia, Pennsylvania, U.S.
- Height: 5 ft 10 in (178 cm)
- Weight: 181 lb (82 kg; 12 st 13 lb)
- Position: Right wing
- Shot: Right
- Played for: Portland Pirates; Lehigh Valley Phantoms
- NHL draft: 159th overall, 2008; Phoenix Coyotes
- Playing career: 2011–2015

Medal record

Ice hockey

Representing Canada West

World Junior A Challenge
| Gold medal – first place | 2007 Trail | |

Brett Hextall (born April 2, 1988) is an American-born Canadian former professional ice hockey player and current coach, who played four seasons in the American Hockey League (AHL) for the Portland Pirates and Lehigh Valley Phantoms.

== Playing career ==
Hextall was drafted by the Phoenix Coyotes in the sixth round (159th overall) of the 2008 NHL entry draft.

In April 2011, the Coyotes signed Hextall to an entry-level contract. He played the next three seasons for the Portland Pirates, the Coyotes' AHL affiliate. Following the 2013–14 season, the Coyotes did not make a qualifying offer to Hextall, allowing him to become an unrestricted free agent.

On August 25, 2014, the Lehigh Valley Phantoms signed Hextall to a one-year AHL contract. He retired following the season.

== Coaching career ==
Hextall joined the Philadelphia Flyers coaching staff in 2017. He served as a player development coach until 2020, before moving to the Pittsburgh Penguins in 2021 as an integrated development coach working under his father and Penguins general manager, Ron Hextall.

== Personal life ==
Hextall is the son of former NHL goaltender and former general manager of the Pittsburgh Penguins Ron Hextall (and grandson of Bryan Jr. and great-grandson of Bryan Sr.). Brett studied at the University of North Dakota, just like his great-uncle Dennis.

Hextall currently lives in Iowa City with his wife Mamie, who is a resident doctor.

== Career statistics ==
| | | | Regular season | | | | | Playoffs |
| Season | Team | League | GP | G | A | Pts | PIM | GP | G | A | Pts | PIM |
|---|---|---|---|---|---|---|---|---|---|---|---|---|
| 2006–07 | Penticton Vees | BCHL | 59 | 18 | 27 | 45 | 156 | 11 | 2 | 2 | 4 | 8 |
| 2007–08 | Penticton Vees | BCHL | 54 | 24 | 48 | 72 | 52 | 15 | 12 | 3 | 15 | 12 |
| 2008–09 | University of North Dakota | WCHA | 42 | 12 | 14 | 26 | 95 | — | — | — | — | — |
| 2009–10 | University of North Dakota | WCHA | 34 | 14 | 12 | 26 | 88 | — | — | — | — | — |
| 2010–11 | University of North Dakota | WCHA | 39 | 13 | 16 | 29 | 63 | — | — | — | — | — |
| 2011–12 | Portland Pirates | AHL | 72 | 7 | 8 | 15 | 59 | — | — | — | — | — |
| 2012–13 | Portland Pirates | AHL | 66 | 9 | 6 | 15 | 79 | 3 | 0 | 0 | 0 | 4 |
| 2013–14 | Portland Pirates | AHL | 59 | 11 | 12 | 23 | 83 | — | — | — | — | — |
| 2014–15 | Lehigh Valley Phantoms | AHL | 63 | 6 | 8 | 14 | 119 | — | — | — | — | — |
| AHL totals | | | 260 | 33 | 34 | 67 | 340 | 3 | 0 | 0 | 0 | 4 |

== Notable awards and honors ==
- WCHA All-Academic Team (2009–10, 2010–11).
