= George Ede (biathlete) =

Canadian biathlete

George Ede (9 May 1940 – 9 June 2012) was a Canadian biathlete who competed in the 1968 Winter Olympics.
