= Marcia Parsons =

Canadian speed skater

Personal information
- Born: 23 April 1948 (age 77) Red Deer, Alberta, Canada

Sport
- Sport: Speed skating

Marcia Parsons (born 23 April 1948) is a Canadian speed skater. She competed in four events at the 1968 Winter Olympics.
