= Purvis McDougall =

Canadian bobsledder

Personal information
- Born: 3 August 1935; Montreal, Quebec, Canada
- Died: 9 September 2001 (aged 66); Montreal, Canada

Sport
- Sport: Bobsleigh

Purvis McDougall (3 August 1935 – 9 September 2001) was a Canadian bobsledder. He competed in the two-man and the four-man events at the 1968 Winter Olympics.
