= Lyndsai Cowan =

Canadian figure skater

Personal information
- Born: 6 January 1949 (age 77) Toronto, Ontario, Canada

Sport
- Sport: Figure skating

Lyndsai Cowan (born 6 January 1949) is a Canadian figure skater. She competed in the ladies' singles event at the 1968 Winter Olympics.

== Competitive career ==
Cowan won the bronze medal in the women's singles event at the 1968 Canadian Figure Skating Championships in Vancouver, finishing behind Karen Magnussen and Linda Carbonetto.

At the 1968 Winter Olympics in Grenoble, France, Cowan was one of three Canadian competitors in the women's singles event, alongside Magnussen and Carbonetto. She did not finish the competition, while Magnussen placed seventh and Carbonetto thirteenth.
