= Pete Williamson =

Canadian speed skater

Personal information
- Born: 1 August 1946; Winnipeg, Manitoba, Canada
- Died: 7 July 1991 (aged 44); Winnipeg, Manitoba, Canada

Sport
- Sport: Speed skating

Pete Williamson (1 August 1946 – 7 July 1991) was a Canadian speed skater. He competed in two events at the 1968 Winter Olympics.
