= George Rattai =

Canadian biathlete (born 1943)

George Rattai (born 12 October 1943) is a Canadian former biathlete who competed in the 1968 Winter Olympics.
