= Brian Glennie =

Canadian ice hockey player (1946–2020)

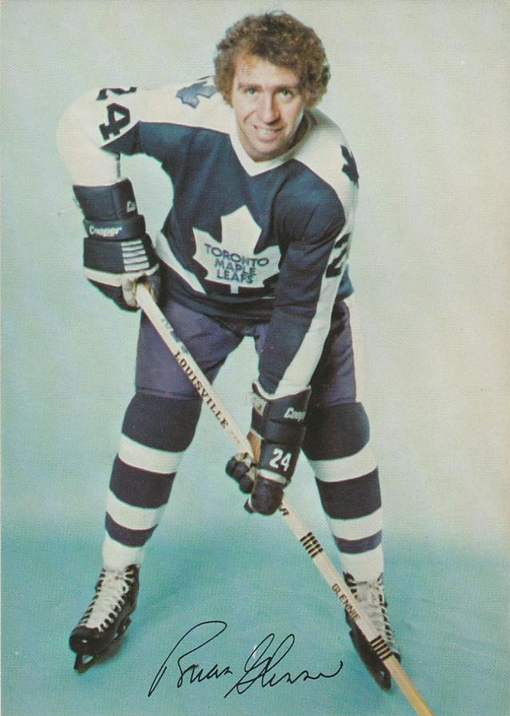
- Glennie in 1976 postcard
- Born: August 29, 1946 Toronto, Ontario, Canada
- Died: February 7, 2020 (aged 73) Ottawa, Ontario, Canada
- Height: 6 ft 1 in (185 cm)
- Weight: 197 lb (89 kg; 14 st 1 lb)
- Position: Defence
- Shot: Left
- Played for: Toronto Maple Leafs; Los Angeles Kings
- National team: Canada
- Playing career: 1968–1979
Medal record
Men's ice hockey
Bronze medal – third place	1968 Grenoble	team

Brian Glennie (August 29, 1946 – February 7, 2020) was a Canadian professional ice hockey defenceman who played in the National Hockey League (NHL) from 1969 until 1979. Glennie was a master of the hip-check.

== Amateur career ==
Glennie was born in Toronto, Ontario. He had an outstanding junior career with the Toronto Marlboros of the Ontario Hockey Association, eventually captaining the team to the 1967 Memorial Cup. As a PeeWee he was coached by future Toronto Maple Leafs coach Roger Neilson.

After junior Glennie joined the Canadian National Team program run by Father David Bauer for the 1967–68 season. He was a member of the Canadian team in the 1968 Olympics at Grenoble, France which won the bronze medal. This tournament was also representative of the IIHF World Championship.

== Pro career ==
As a pro Glennie went on to play 572 career NHL games, all but 18 with the Toronto Maple Leafs, scoring 14 goals and 100 assists for 114 points. Glennie, a defensive, hard-hitting defenceman was often paired with the offensively-skilled defencemen on the Leafs, such as Tim Horton, Börje Salming and more frequently former Marlboro teammate Jim McKenny. Glennie has described his playing style as "a standup guy who would take the guy out" and his partner would then "get the puck and start something happening." In 2008, The Hockey News ranked Glennie #6 on their list of the best all-time body checkers.

He was a member of Team Canada in the 1972 Summit Series. While he did not have the opportunity to play against the Soviet Union, Brian played in Canada's three mid-series exhibition games, two against Sweden and one against reigning world champion Czechoslovakia. He counted the experience among the greatest of his life.

Glennie sustained a mild concussion in the second period of a 7–3 win over the Detroit Red Wings at Maple Leaf Gardens on November 5, 1975, after Dan Maloney attacked him from behind, flattened him with a right-hand punch, hit him several more times and repeatedly lifted and dropped him to the ice. Maloney had come to the defence of teammate Bryan Hextall who had received a hit from Glennie which was described by The Associated Press as "a clean check." Maloney, who claimed the force of the contact was excessive and that he had no intention of injuring Glennie, was charged with assault by Attorney General of Ontario Roy McMurtry the following day on November 6. The third NHL player to ever be prosecuted by local authorities with a crime resulting from action on the ice, Maloney was acquitted just under eight months later on June 30, 1976.

In 1978, Glennie joined Lanny McDonald in a Swanson Hungry-Man entree commercial in which Glennie rips off the door of the refrigerator. Glennie died in Ottawa at the age of 73 in February 2020 after years of declining health.

== Honours and awards ==
1967 Memorial Cup (captain)
Bronze medal 1968 Winter Olympics
Inducted Canada's Sports Hall of Fame in 2005.

== Career statistics ==
=== Regular season and playoffs ===
			Regular season					Playoffs
Season	Team	League	GP	G	A	Pts	PIM	GP	G	A	Pts	PIM
1964–65	Toronto Marlboros	OHA	56	2	18	20	84	19	0	9	9	22
1965–66	Toronto Marlboros	OHA	48	5	18	23	134	14	0	4	4	57
1966–67	Michigan State University	WCHA	2	0	0	0	4	—	—	—	—	—
1966–67	Toronto Marlboros	OHA	43	5	39	44	113	17	2	12	14	44
1966–67	Toronto Marlboros	MC	—	—	—	—	—	9	2	9	11	18
1967–68	Ottawa Nationals	OHA Sr	30	2	10	12	20	—	—	—	—	—
1967–68	Canadian National Team	Intl	10	2	10	12	20	—	—	—	—	—
1968–69	Rochester Americans	AHL	15	1	1	2	16	—	—	—	—	—
1968–69	Tulsa Oilers	CHL	25	4	7	11	40	7	1	3	4	12
1969–70	Toronto Maple Leafs	NHL	52	1	14	15	50	—	—	—	—	—
1970–71	Toronto Maple Leafs	NHL	54	0	8	8	31	3	0	0	0	0
1971–72	Toronto Maple Leafs	NHL	61	2	8	10	44	5	0	0	0	25
1972–73	Toronto Maple Leafs	NHL	44	1	10	11	54	—	—	—	—	—
1973–74	Toronto Maple Leafs	NHL	65	4	18	22	100	3	0	0	0	10
1974–75	Toronto Maple Leafs	NHL	63	1	7	8	110	—	—	—	—	—
1975–76	Toronto Maple Leafs	NHL	69	0	8	8	75	6	0	1	1	15
1976–77	Toronto Maple Leafs	NHL	69	1	10	11	73	2	0	0	0	0
1977–78	Toronto Maple Leafs	NHL	77	2	15	17	62	13	0	0	0	16
1978–79	Los Angeles Kings	NHL	18	2	2	4	22	—	—	—	—	—
NHL totals			572	14	100	114	621	32	0	1	1	66

=== International ===
Year	Team	Event	GP	G	A	Pts	PIM
1968	Canada	OLY	7	0	1	1	10
Senior totals			7	0	1	1	10
