= Anna Sablina =

Russian speed skater

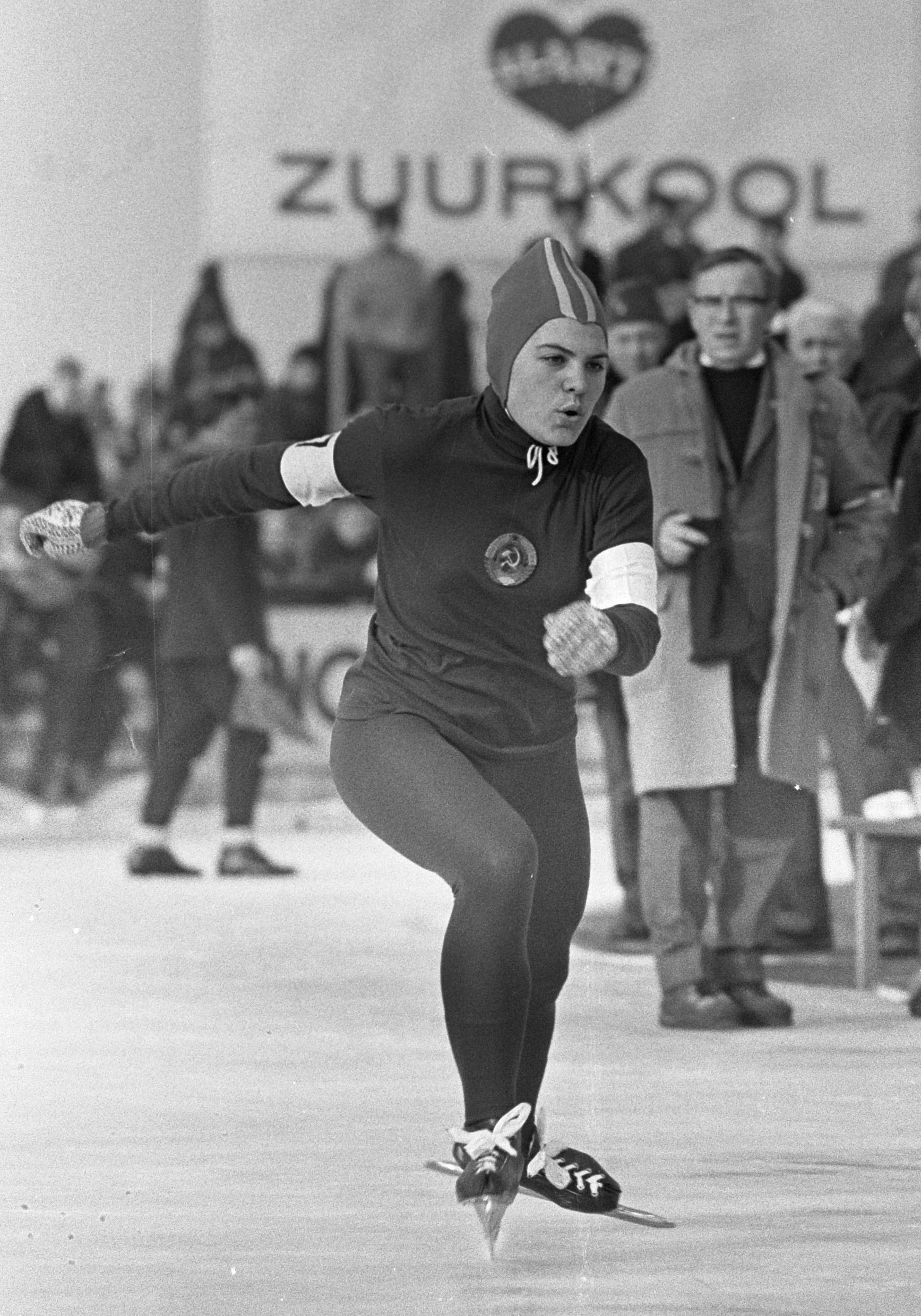
- Sablina in 1967

Personal information
- Full name: Anna Aleksandrovna Sablina
- Born: 22 February 1945 (age 81) Chelyabinsk, Russian SFSR, Soviet Union
- Height: 1.60 m (5 ft 3 in)
- Weight: 56 kg (123 lb)

Sport
- Sport: Speed skating
- Club: Burevestnik Chelyabinsk

Anna Aleksandrovna Sablina (née Subareva; Russian: Анна Александровна Саблина, née Субарева; born 22 February 1945) is a retired Russian speed skater. She competed at the 1968 Winter Olympics in the 3000 m and finished in eighth place.

Personal bests:

- 500 m – 45.99 (1975)
- 1000 m – 1:32.2 (1973)
- 1500 m – 2:17.25 (1975)
- 3000 m – 4:52.52 (1973)
