= Dennis Hextall =

Canadian ice hockey player

- Born: April 17, 1943 (age 83) Poplar Point, Manitoba, Canada
- Height: 5 ft 11 in (180 cm)
- Weight: 175 lb (79 kg; 12 st 7 lb)
- Position: center
- Shot: Left
- Played for: New York Rangers; Los Angeles Kings; California Golden Seals; Minnesota North Stars; Detroit Red Wings; Washington Capitals
- Playing career: 1967–1980

Dennis Hextall (born April 17, 1943) is a former NHL all star professional hockey forward who spent most of his career with the Minnesota North Stars and Detroit Red Wings. Won a national championship with University of North Dakota. Led the NHL western conference in assists. Led the North Stars in assists, points and penalty minutes while serving as assistant captain. As captain of the Redwings he ended the playoff drought of the 70s by leading Detroit to the 2nd round of the 78 playoffs. Served as assistant captain-player/coach to end his career with the Washington Capitals. Served multiple years as the president of the Redwing Alumni. Served as Commissioner of the IHL. He is the son of Bryan Hextall, brother of Bryan Hextall Jr., uncle of Ron Hextall and sportscaster Leah Hextall, and great-uncle of AHL player Brett Hextall.

== Personal ==
Hextall was born in Poplar Point, a community 33 km northeast of Portage la Prairie, Manitoba, in 1943.

== Career ==
Hextall played two years at the University of North Dakota, then played briefly in the Eastern Hockey League, Central Professional Hockey League, and American Hockey League (AHL). He broke into the NHL with the New York Rangers during the 1968 playoffs. Over the next few years he jumped back and forth between the AHL and NHL, spending time with the Rangers, Los Angeles Kings and California Golden Seals. In 1972 he secured a spot with the Minnesota North Stars, for whom he played five seasons as assistant captain. He then spent four seasons as captain with the Detroit Red Wings and two more with the Washington Capitals. In thirteen NHL seasons he played 681 games and recorded 153 goals, 350 assists, 503 points, and 1398 penalty minutes.

Hextall is currently on the board of directors of the Detroit Red Wings alumni team, and is active in its efforts to raise money for children's charities in Metro Detroit. He is also the coaching director for the Victory Honda AAA hockey club. In September 2009, Hextall was named the President and Commissioner of the International Hockey League, a mid-level minor hockey league based in the northern Midwestern United States.

== Awards and honours ==
Award	Year
All-WCHA Second team	1964–65
All-WCHA First Team	1965–66

- AHL Second All-Star Team (1969)
- Played in NHL All-Star Game (1974 & 1975)
- "Honoured Member" of the Manitoba Hockey Hall of Fame
- Member of the Manitoba Sports Hall of Fame (2008)

== Career statistics ==
			Regular season					Playoffs
Season	Team	League	GP	G	A	Pts	PIM	GP	G	A	Pts	PIM
1961–62	Brandon Wheat Kings	MJHL	39	11	18	29	24	9	0	3	3	4
1961–62	Brandon Wheat Kings	M-Cup	—	—	—	—	—	11	2	3	5	9
1962–63	Brandon Wheat Kings	MJHL	39	21	46	67	17	19	16	10	26	12
1962–63	Brandon Wheat Kings	M-Cup	—	—	—	—	—	9	5	6	11	8
1963–64	University of North Dakota	WCHA	—	—	—	—	—	—	—	—	—	—
1964–65	University of North Dakota	WCHA	33	17	36	53	33	—	—	—	—	—
1965–66	University of North Dakota	WCHA	30	19	29	48	30	—	—	—	—	—
1966–67	Knoxville Knights	EHL	61	20	56	76	202	4	3	2	5	21
1967–68	Omaha Knights	CPHL	10	0	2	2	9	—	—	—	—	—
1967–68	Buffalo Bisons	AHL	51	15	33	48	114	5	1	5	6	12
1967–68	New York Rangers	NHL	—	—	—	—	—	2	0	0	0	0
1968–69	New York Rangers	NHL	13	1	4	5	25	—	—	—	—	—
1968–69	Buffalo Bisons	AHL	60	21	44	65	179	6	1	3	4	6
1969–70	Los Angeles Kings	NHL	28	5	7	12	40	—	—	—	—	—
1969–70	Springfield Kings	AHL	10	5	8	13	52	—	—	—	—	—
1969–70	Montreal Voyageurs	AHL	29	10	19	29	126	8	2	5	7	29
1970–71	California Golden Seals	NHL	78	21	31	52	217	—	—	—	—	—
1971–72	Minnesota North Stars	NHL	33	6	10	16	49	7	0	2	2	19
1971–72	Cleveland Barons	AHL	5	1	1	2	18	—	—	—	—	—
1972–73	Minnesota North Stars	NHL	78	30	52	82	140	6	2	0	2	16
1973–74	Minnesota North Stars	NHL	78	20	62	82	138	—	—	—	—	—
1974–75	Minnesota North Stars	NHL	80	17	57	74	147	—	—	—	—	—
1975–76	Minnesota North Stars	NHL	59	11	35	46	93	—	—	—	—	—
1975–76	Detroit Red Wings	NHL	17	5	9	14	71	—	—	—	—	—
1976–77	Detroit Red Wings	NHL	78	14	32	46	158	—	—	—	—	—
1977–78	Detroit Red Wings	NHL	78	16	33	49	195	7	1	1	2	10
1978–79	Detroit Red Wings	NHL	20	4	8	12	33	—	—	—	—	—
1978–79	Washington Capitals	NHL	26	2	9	11	43	—	—	—	—	—
1979–80	Washington Capitals	NHL	15	1	1	2	49	—	—	—	—	—
NHL totals			681	153	350	503	1,398	22	3	3	6	45

== See also ==
- Notable families in the NHL

Sporting positions
Preceded by Dan Maloney	Detroit Red Wings captain 1978–79	Succeeded by Nick Libett; Paul Woods
