= Ron Hextall =

Canadian ice hockey player (born 1964)

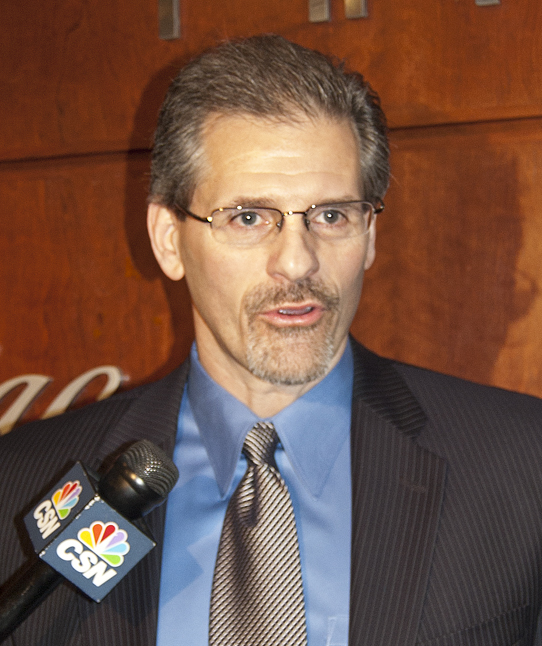
- Hextall in 2014
- Born: May 3, 1964 (age 62) Brandon, Manitoba, Canada
- Height: 6 ft 3 in (191 cm)
- Weight: 205 lb (93 kg; 14 st 9 lb)
- Position: Goaltender
- Caught: Left
- Played for: Philadelphia Flyers; Quebec Nordiques; New York Islanders
- National team: Canada
- NHL draft: 119th overall, 1982; Philadelphia Flyers
- Playing career: 1984–1999

Ronald Jeffrey Hextall (born May 3, 1964) is a Canadian former professional ice hockey player and executive. He was most recently the general manager of the Pittsburgh Penguins of the National Hockey League (NHL). Hextall was a goaltender for 13 seasons for the Philadelphia Flyers, Quebec Nordiques, and New York Islanders from 1986 to 1999. He served as assistant general manager for the Flyers for one season, and was promoted to general manager of the Philadelphia Flyers, replacing Paul Holmgren on May 7, 2014. He held this position for four and a half seasons. Before this he served as assistant general manager for the Los Angeles Kings, who won the Stanley Cup in 2012.

Hextall played 11 of his 13 seasons over two stints with the Flyers. He holds several team records and is a member of the Flyers Hall of Fame. During his rookie season in 1986–87, he was awarded the Vezina Trophy as the league's top goaltender and led the Flyers to the Stanley Cup Final. Despite the Flyers' loss to the Edmonton Oilers in seven games, he won the Conn Smythe Trophy as the playoffs' most valuable player, making him one of only six players to win the trophy in a losing effort. (Note: As of 2024.) Injuries in the middle of his career contributed to a drop in his playing ability; as a result, he was traded on three occasions in the off-seasons between 1992 and 1994 to the Nordiques, the Islanders and then back to the Flyers. Upon his return to Philadelphia, Hextall regained confidence and form, recording goals against averages (GAA) below 3.00 in each of his five subsequent seasons – the lowest of his career. He retired from the NHL at the end of the 1998–99 season.

Hextall became the first NHL goaltender to score a goal by shooting the puck into the opponent's empty net, against the Boston Bruins in the 1987–88 season. The following season, he became the first goaltender to score in the playoffs, by shooting the puck into the Washington Capitals' empty net. His mobile style of play, in which he provided support to his defencemen by coming out of the goal area to play the puck was revolutionary, and inspired future generations of goaltenders, such as Martin Brodeur. He was also known for being one of the NHL's most aggressive goaltenders: he was suspended for six or more games on three occasions, had more than 100 penalty minutes in each of his first three seasons, and set new records for the number of penalty minutes recorded by a goaltender in the NHL.

== Early life ==
Ron Hextall was born on May 3, 1964, in Brandon, Manitoba, the third and youngest child of Bryan and Fay Hextall. Hextall is a third-generation NHL player – his grandfather, Hall of Famer Bryan Hextall, played 11 seasons with the New York Rangers, and was inducted into the Hockey Hall of Fame in 1969. His father, Bryan Hextall, Jr., played in the NHL for 10 seasons, most notably for the Pittsburgh Penguins, and his uncle, Dennis Hextall, played 14 seasons of NHL hockey, not staying with any one club for longer than five years. During his youth, Hextall saw his father and uncle often roughed up by the Philadelphia Flyers, whose aggressive style of play for much of the 1970s gave the team the name "Broad Street Bullies". Hextall later reflected that during this period he "hated the Flyers."

Because of his father's career, Hextall's education was far from stable; each year began at Brandon, and once the hockey season commenced in October, he moved to a school nearer to where his father was playing. At school, he achieved B and C grades, putting in the minimum amount of effort, but his mind remained on hockey, and specifically goaltending. "Everybody else would be working and I'd be drawing pictures of Tony Esposito and Jimmy Rutherford," he recalled. Hextall came to mostly enjoy the constant moving, later saying "I got to hang around NHL rinks. What more would I have wanted?"

Although both his father and grandfather played as forwards, his father was happy for him to play in goal, but insisted that he try other positions to improve his skating: Bryan believed his son would have made a good defenceman. Hextall's mother thought her son's love for hockey exceeded that of her husband's teammates and believed it would drive him to achieve his aim of goaltending in the NHL. Each summer, Hextall received training at the hockey school at which his father taught, but the hockey programs in Pittsburgh and Atlanta were sub-standard, and meant that during his teenage years, he was behind many of his fellow players. He describes himself as "[not] what you would call real polished" in his first year of junior hockey, aged 17.

== Playing career ==
=== Junior hockey ===
Hextall began his junior hockey career in 1980 with the Melville Millionaires in the Saskatchewan Junior Hockey League (SJHL). In the 1980–81 season, his solitary season with the club, he played 37 games with a goals against average (GAA) of 6.57. In one game that season, against the Prince Albert Raiders, Hextall faced 105 shots, and made 84 saves, a performance described as brilliant by the Regina Leader-Post. Although the Millionaires lost 21–2, the reporter noted that if it was not for Hextall, the Raiders could have scored "34 or 35". Millionaires teammate Mark Odnokon praised his performance, particularly the way "he lived up to his responsibilities and stayed in there until the end." In 2009, Hextall was inducted as one of the inaugural members of the SJHL Hall of Fame.

Hextall returned to Brandon for the 1981–82 season, playing for the Brandon Wheat Kings in the Western Hockey League (WHL). He played 30 regular season games for the Wheat Kings, during which he recorded a GAA of 5.71. The Wheat Kings reached the playoffs but were swept four games to none (4–0) in the first-round by the Regina Pats. Hextall played in three of the games, but completed only two and had a GAA of 9.32. His team was regarded as a poor one at the time by critics and Hextall had to battle in each game. Flyers' scout Gerry Melnyk said he could understand why many teams did not rate Hextall: "There were teams who thought he was loony." Melnyk claimed it was these attributes which he was attracted by, and he felt that Hextall could fit in well with the Flyers. Subsequently, the Flyers chose Hextall in the sixth round of the 1982 NHL Draft, 119th overall.

After his selection, Hextall remained with Brandon for two further seasons. He played 44 games in 1982–83, recording a GAA of 5.77 during a season in which the Wheat Kings did not qualify for the playoffs. The following year was his most successful in the WHL: a GAA of 4.29 across his 46 regular season games, which included 29 wins – more than in the previous two seasons combined. He played in ten of the twelve playoff games, recording five wins and five losses, with a GAA of 3.75. During the 1983–84 season, Hextall set a record for the most penalty minutes accumulated by a goaltender, being assessed for 117 minutes during the regular season.

=== Professional hockey ===
Hextall arrived at the Philadelphia Flyers training camp in 1984 with the expectation of playing in the NHL. However, the Flyers subsequently sent him to their farm team in the International Hockey League (IHL), the Kalamazoo Wings. Although disappointed, Hextall was now playing at a higher level than at WHL and made his debut in professional hockey. He played 19 games for Kalamazoo, recording six wins and a GAA of 4.35. During the season, he moved to the Flyers' other farm team; Hershey Bears of the American Hockey League (AHL), where he played 11 times, with four wins, and a GAA of 3.68.

In the following season, Hextall remained with Hershey, appearing in 53 games during the 1985–86 season. He recorded 30 wins and the lowest GAA average of his career to that point, 3.41. The Bears finished the regular season as league leaders, and won the John D. Chick Trophy as the South Division Champions. Hextall lived up to his aggressive reputation in the Conference final, played against the St. Catharines Saints, fighting three different members of the opposition side during a single bench-clearing brawl. The Bears advanced to the Calder Cup final, having beaten the New Haven Nighthawks 4–1 and the St. Catharines Saints 4–3. In the final, they faced the Adirondack Red Wings, who won the championship by four games to two. Hextall played 13 games in the playoffs, of which his team won five, and his GAA was 3.23. He was named as the Dudley "Red" Garrett Memorial Award winner, as the AHL's outstanding rookie player. Looking back on his time in the AHL, Hextall reflected that despite his initial disappointment at not being selected to play for the Flyers straight away, "the two years that I spent in the American League got me to the point where I was sure I could be a No. 1 goaltender at the NHL level."

=== Philadelphia Flyers (1986–1992) ===
==== First three seasons ====
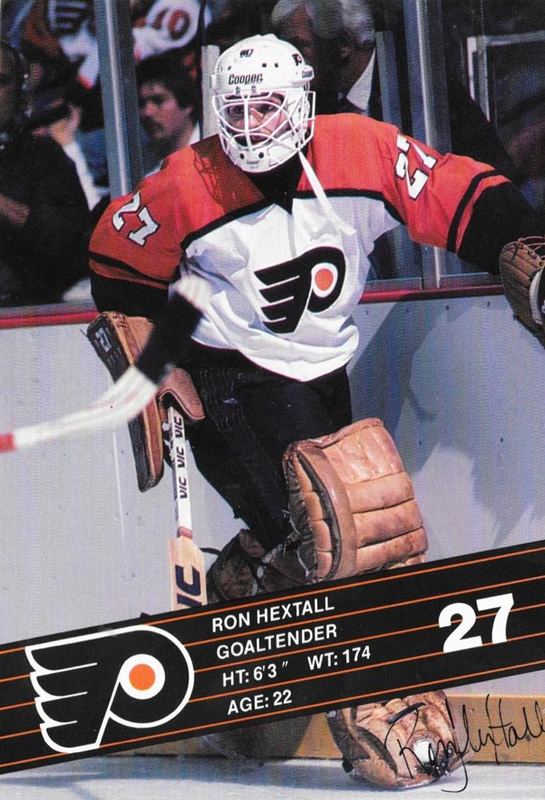
Hextall with the Philadelphia Flyers in 1986

After his performances in the AHL, Hextall was invited to the Flyers' training camp as a long-shot. His play in four exhibition games convinced Flyers' coach Mike Keenan to call up Hextall to the NHL and to play him in the opening game of the 1986–87 season, against the Edmonton Oilers. Hextall conceded a goal from the first shot he faced in the game but allowed no further shots past him, leading his side to a 2–1 victory. Hextall continued to display the aggressive nature with which he had always played, swinging his stick at Brad Smith and Troy Murray early in his first NHL season. Despite these swipes, Hextall claimed at the time that, "I used to be worse, I've learned to control my temper." Two months after making these comments, Hextall was involved in a fight with opposing New Jersey Devils goaltender Alain Chevrier. Having lost to the Devils, the Flyers wanted revenge for Steve Richmond's punch on Kjell Samuelsson at the end of the game; Hextall targeted Chevrier in a fight labelled by Chico Resch as "like a heavyweight against a lightweight." Hextall and seven other players were fined $300 each for their part in the brawl.

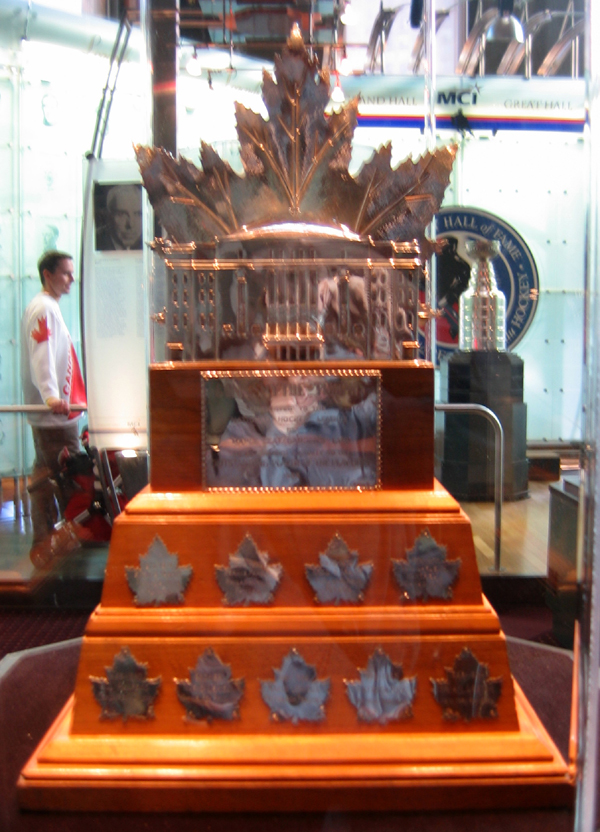
Hextall's play in his rookie year in the NHL earned him the Vezina Trophy and the pictured Conn Smythe Trophy.

In 66 regular season games during his rookie year, Hextall posted a GAA of 3.00 and recorded 37 wins. He was awarded the Vezina Trophy for the most outstanding goaltender by the NHL general managers, but he was second in the voting to Luc Robitaille for the Calder Memorial Trophy, awarded to the "player selected as the most proficient in his first year of competition". Hextall led the Flyers to top their Conference, and win the Prince of Wales Trophy. The Flyers progressed to face the Edmonton Oilers in the Stanley Cup Final, having beaten the New York Rangers 4–2, the New York Islanders 4–3, and the Montreal Canadiens 4–2. Following their series victory over Montreal, Flyers captain Dave Poulin identified Hextall as the team's leading performer. In the fourth game of the Finals, Hextall received two penalties, first a ten-minute misconduct penalty for "expressing his displeasure at the fourth Oiler goal," and later a five-minute penalty for slashing Kent Nilsson. In the latter incident, Hextall had received a slash from Glenn Anderson for which there was no call from the referees, and Hextall sought revenge by striking the back of Nilsson's knees. After the game Hextall expressed remorse for striking the wrong player but not for his action:

If somebody slaps you in the face, you're going to slap him back, it's not like he gave me a touch to jar the puck. What's he going to do next, break my arm? I'm sorry it was Nilsson and not Anderson I hit, but I just reacted. At the time, it seemed the right thing to do.

The performance of Hextall in the next game tied the series and forced a seventh game; at the end, the Flyers team surrounded Hextall in congratulation and the Oilers player Kevin Lowe said that Hextall "held them in it". Between the sixth and seventh games, the Oilers' forward Wayne Gretzky described Hextall as "probably the best goaltender I've ever played against in the NHL." Edmonton won the final game of the series to take the Stanley Cup. Robin Finn, writing in The New York Times, said that the team won the title "without their trademark, those endless waves of madcap scoring", primarily due to the "heroics of Hextall". Flyers teammate Rick Tocchet said that when he realised his side were going to lose, his "first thought was to feel sorry for Ronny Hextall, because he did everything he could to get us here and keep us in it." Hextall was awarded the Conn Smythe Trophy for the most valuable player in the playoffs, becoming only the fourth player from a losing side to be awarded the trophy. During the off-season, Hextall received an eight-game suspension for the start of the 1987–88 season after his slash on Nilsson. Speaking on behalf of the NHL, Brian O'Neill said that: "There is no justification for any player to swing his stick in retaliation and this is especially the case for a goaltender whose stick, because of its weight, can cause serious injury."

I don't mean to sound cocky, but I knew it was just a matter of time before I flipped one in.

— Hextall addresses the media after scoring his first NHL goal

The Flyers had a difficult start to the 1987–88 season, partly attributed by Keenan to the absence of Hextall. Hextall returned to the Flyers line-up against the New York Rangers, and made over 40 saves in a 2–2 tie. Just over a month later, on December 8, 1987, Hextall became the first goaltender to shoot at goal and score in the NHL when he scored an empty net goal towards the end of a game against the Boston Bruins. (Note: Billy Smith was the first NHL goaltender to be credited with a goal, on November 28, 1979, when he was the last player on the New York Islanders team to touch the puck before opposition defencemen Rob Ramage passed the puck into his own net.) The Flyers led 4–2 which prompted the Bruins to pull their goaltender in favour of an extra attacker. The puck was dumped into the Philadelphia zone by the Bruins, and Hextall picked it up without any players near him; his shot fired into the air, bounced and rolled into the net. Hextall had targeted becoming the "first NHL goaltender to score a true goal" over a year earlier, and, speaking after the game, commented that: "I knew I could do it. It was a matter of when." Despite his early season suspension, and a shoulder injury late in the season which made him miss five games, Hextall played 62 of the 67 games for which he was available during the regular season. He recorded 30 wins, and a GAA of 3.50, slightly higher than during his rookie year. Hextall struggled in the playoffs: he was replaced in successive games of the series against the Washington Capitals having conceded four goals in each. In the final two games of the series, which the Capitals won 4–3, Hextall gave up a further 12 goals, and completed the playoffs with a GAA of 4.75.

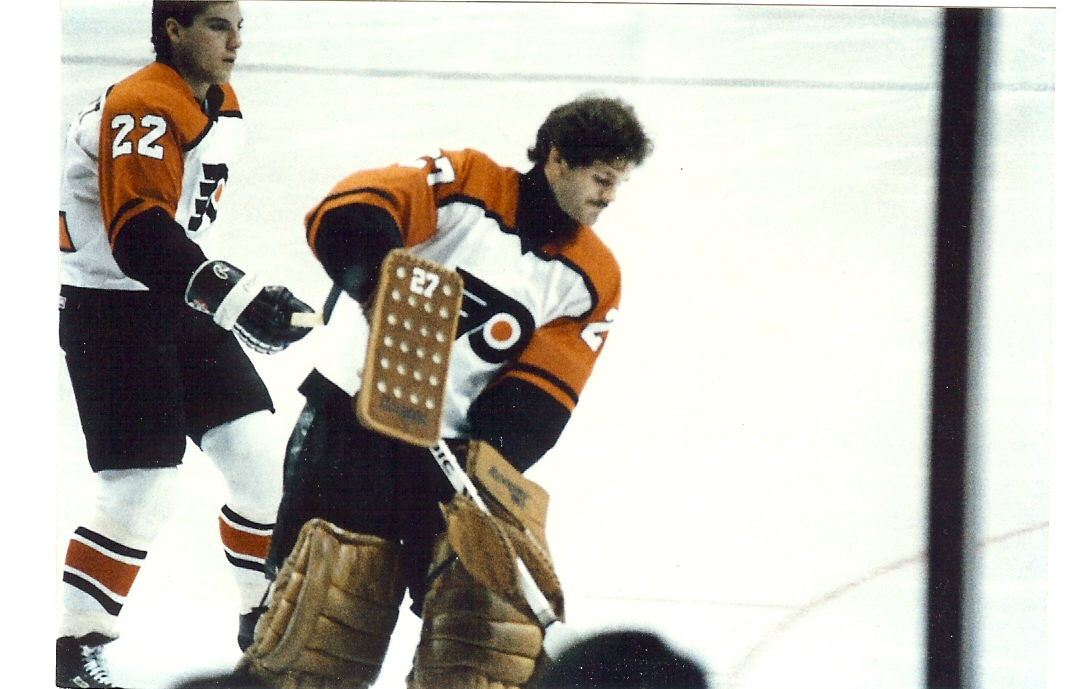
Hextall in 1987, pictured alongside Rick Tocchet

In each of his first two seasons, Hextall accumulated 104 penalty minutes during the regular season, the first time that a goaltender had collected over 100. In the 1988–89 season, he broke his own record, being assessed 113 penalty minutes, the most by any goaltender in an NHL season (as of 2015). Hextall completed the 1988–89 regular season with 30 wins, the third consecutive season in which he had recorded so many, and the first time a goaltender had recorded 30 wins in each of their first three seasons in the NHL. The Flyers finished fourth in the Patrick Division and qualified for the playoffs. They faced the Washington Capitals in the first round, and the teams shared the first four games. The Flyers won the fifth, despite being 5–4 down in the third period. Flyers' defenceman Mark Howe credited their victory to Hextall. Late in the game, the Capitals pulled their goaltender, and Hextall scored the second goal of his career. The puck was shot into the Flyers' left defensive zone by Scott Stevens, and Hextall went around the back of his net, controlled the puck and shot at the goal. He became the first goaltender to score a goal in the NHL playoffs. The Flyers won 8–5, and went on to win the series 4–2, which Joe Sexton of The New York Times attributed primarily to Hextall's return to form.

Against the Penguins in the Patrick Division Final, Hextall's performances were mixed: he under-performed early in the series, and in game five was swapped out of the net and then reinstated twice during a 10–7 defeat for the Flyers. Hextall faced 17 shots in the game, conceding nine of the Penguins goals. After the game, he denied being out of control, despite having assaulted one of the officials and chasing Rob Brown around the ice. He said, "I like to think I'm strong mentally. Hey, if I was as out of control as people say I am, I wouldn't be in the National Hockey League." The Penguins coach, Gene Ubriaco, agreed with Hextall's assessment, and believed the goaltender lost control intentionally: "He uses a loss of control to his advantage, in a way. He's the extreme example of controlled violence. And they [the Flyers] live and die with it." The Flyers won the next game to force a decider, but Hextall was ruled out of the contest with a first degree sprain of the medial collateral ligament (MCL) in his right knee. Hextall's injury kept him out of the first three games of the series against the Canadiens, during which the Canadiens took a 2–1 lead. He returned for the fourth game, but could not prevent his side losing 3–0. The Flyers won the following game to extend the series to six games, but lost the next game 4–2, and were eliminated. Hextall displayed his violent side during the final minutes of game six, skating out of his crease to attack Chris Chelios. Hextall claimed that the attack was in retaliation for Chelios' hit on his Flyer teammate Brian Propp in game one, when Chelios caught Flyer Propp with a "flying elbow" to the side of the head, rendering him unconscious. Hextall was given a 12-game suspension for his actions, at the beginning of the 1989–90 season. Following the announcement of the suspension, Hextall stated his disappointment, and added that his intention was to fight rather than hurt Chelios.

==== Contract rebel and injury troubles ====
Prior to the 1989–90 season, Hextall became unhappy that his eight-year, $4 million contract was only earning him $325,000 a year, and hired a confrontational agent, Ritch Winter, to renegotiate his contract. The Flyers refused to deal with the agent, and at a tearful press conference, Hextall declared his contract invalid and announced that he would not take part in the team's training camp. After negotiations about which neither side revealed details, Hextall returned to practice with the team on October 20, 42 days later. Hextall suffered a slight groin pull during his first game back, and in his second, he hurt his left hamstring. Just under a month later, while playing for the Hershey Bears in an attempt to establish his fitness, he was carried off the ice after once more hurting his groin. In total that season, Hextall appeared nine times; once for the Bears in the AHL, and eight times for the Flyers. In the NHL, he recorded a GAA of 4.15, the highest he averaged during any single season of the NHL.

Hextall continued to be plagued by groin injuries during the next two seasons, twice straining his left groin muscle in the 1990–91 season. The Flyers' orthopaedist, Dr. Arthur Bartolozzi, suggested a possible reason for his series of injuries:

He is in motion anticipating the shot before the guy even hits the puck. So he's already on the ice or doing a split or anticipating the shot well before it's made. That's probably what makes him a great goaltender. But it's also what may predispose him to injury.

In 1990–91, Hextall appeared in 36 NHL games, less than half of those played by the Flyers that season. He recorded 13 wins, with a GAA of 3.13. For the second successive year, the Flyers failed to qualify for the playoffs. Early the following season, Hextall received the third significant suspension of his career, missing six games for slashing Detroit forward Jim Cummins during a preseason game. Suspension, further injuries, and a lack of form meant Hextall appeared 45 times for the Flyers. He recorded 16 wins during the season, resulting in his lowest win percentage in the NHL, 35.56%.

=== Quebec Nordiques (1992–1993) ===
In the 1992 off-season, Hextall was part of the trade which brought Eric Lindros to the Philadelphia Flyers. Lindros, who had been picked first overall by the Quebec Nordiques in the 1991 entry draft, had refused to play for Quebec during the 1991–92 season, forcing the club's owner Marcel Aubut to trade him. While negotiating to get the best possible deal, Aubut traded Lindros to both the Flyers and the Rangers, meaning an arbitrator had to rule which club should receive him. During the ten days between the trades being made and the arbitrator's ruling, there was a lot of speculation about which Flyers' and Rangers' players were involved in the potential trades. Hextall was among the players mentioned, something which he was unhappy about. Speaking through his agent, Hextall admitted to being "scared to death" about the possibility of moving with his family to the French-speaking area. On July 30, the arbitrator ruled in favour of the Philadelphia Flyers, and Hextall was traded to Quebec, along with five other players, two first round selections (in 1993 and 1994), and $15,000,000 cash for Lindros.

In The New York Times preview of the Adams Division for the 1992–93 season, Hextall is described as "inconsistent and injury-prone", while the players gained in the Lindros trade were collectively dubbed as "good players but no superstars." Hextall regained some of the confidence he displayed during his first years in Philadelphia, and although a strained thigh muscle kept him out towards the end of the regular season, he helped the Nordiques to reach the playoffs for the first time since 1987. Quebec were eliminated 4–2 by the Montreal Canadiens in the first round, during which Hextall was praised as being "at the top of his game".

=== New York Islanders (1993–1994) ===
After only one season with the Nordiques, Hextall was traded to the New York Islanders in return for Mark Fitzpatrick on June 20, 1993, a move made because the Nordiques could only protect one goalie for the expansion draft and instead of losing him chose to trade him to Long Island. The two teams also traded first-round draft picks. The move was a surprise for Hextall, who had settled in well in Quebec with his family. Don Maloney, the Islanders' general manager, described the trade as "too good to pass up". The trade was praised on the Islanders' side by The New York Times as possibly "the best in the league over the off season". Hextall had a poor beginning to his career as an Islander, conceding 23 goals in 14 periods at the start of the 1993–94 season, resulting in his replacement prior to the third period against the New Jersey Devils in mid-October. During that game, in which the Islanders were playing at home, Hextall was jeered by the crowd, something to which he had become accustomed during his time with Philadelphia. In contrast to the fans' derision, Hextall's teammates backed him, taking some of the blame themselves, and expressing their belief in their new colleague. Steve Thomas suggested that Hextall was "one of the best goalies in the league, easily in the top five or 10," while coach Al Arbour dismissed dropping Hextall, saying that "We're not playing well in front of the goaltender and he can only be as good as the guys in front of him." Any thoughts that Arbour might have had of replacing Hextall as the team's number-one goaltender were limited by the play of his back-up, Tom Draper, who recorded a GAA of 4.23 in the seven NHL games he played that season. This, coupled with the lack of experienced goaltenders at the club's IHL affiliate, the Salt Lake Golden Eagles, resulted in Hextall starting 20 games in a row until Jamie McLennan was called up from the Golden Eagles.

The break, and challenge, that Hextall was afforded by McLennan's call-up helped him to recover his form, and in February, he made consecutive shutouts against the Ottawa Senators and Washington Capitals. He recorded another shutout in his next home game, against the Flyers, and was shortly thereafter named as the NHL's player of the week. During the regular season with the Islanders, Hextall recorded a career-best five shutouts, and a GAA of 3.08, the best since his rookie year. Maloney described Hextall's time with the team as having "a slow start and a disastrous finish". The Islanders reached the playoffs, but were swept 4–0 by their rivals, the New York Rangers. Hextall played three of the four games, conceding 16 goals for a GAA of 6.08, the worst average of his NHL career by some distance. After the season had concluded, Maloney said that he believed that only two Islanders players had distinguished themselves during the 1993–94 season, with one of those being Jamie McLennan. He also praised Hextall's play during his long sequence of starts, but five months later, Maloney traded Hextall back to Philadelphia. He described the move as being two-pronged: it would appease the fans and prevent the derisory calls when the team was struggling, and it would give McLennan a chance to establish himself as the number-one goaltender. Hextall was traded with a sixth-round draft pick to the Flyers for goaltender Tommy Söderström on September 22, 1994.

=== Return to Philadelphia (1994–1999) ===
In the 1994–95 season, his first season back in Philadelphia, Hextall played 31 games and recorded his lowest GAA in a season to that point, 2.89. The Flyers reached the playoffs for the first time in six years. After defeating the Buffalo Sabres in the first round, the Flyers faced the New York Rangers in the second. Following the Rangers sweep of the Islanders the previous season, the Rangers' fans chanted "We Want Hex-tall!" during their game-six victory in the first round. The Flyers' coach, Terry Murray dismissed the chants, stating that "emotionally he's really under control." The New York Times supported this belief, claiming that "this isn't the same Ron Hextall they remember so fondly". The Flyers won the first two games of the series, and at Madison Square Garden, Hextall had a quiet game in which he even acted as a calming influence to teammates Kevin Haller and Dmitri Yushkevich, a turnaround from the aggressiveness he had displayed earlier in his career. The Flyers swept the Rangers 4–0 and advanced to the Conference Final against the New Jersey Devils, to whom they lost 4–2. Hextall's statistics in the playoffs were his best since his rookie year: he recorded ten wins with a GAA of 2.81.

For the first time in three seasons, Hextall was not traded during the off-season, and remained with the Flyers for the 1995–96 season. During the regular season, Hextall improved on his figures from the previous year, passing 30 wins for the first time since 1988–89. His GAA of 2.17 was both the best in the NHL that year, and the best of Hextall's career. In the playoffs, Hextall played in all twelve of the Flyers' games, a 4–2 first round victory over the Tampa Bay Lightning followed by a 4–2 defeat to the Florida Panthers. His GAA of 2.13 was his lowest recorded in any postseason. He continued to perform well over the next two seasons, passing 30 wins again in 1996–97, and adding another nine shutouts to the four he had made in 1995–96. Over his first five seasons in the NHL, Hextall only made one shutout, while in his final six seasons, he achieved the feat on nineteen occasions. The Flyers progressed to the 1997 Stanley Cup Final, though Hextall only appeared in eight playoff games, finishing seven of them. Throughout the season and the playoffs, the uncertainty in goal resulted in Hextall and Garth Snow swapping places regularly. Snow started nine of the ten games during the first two rounds, but Hextall replaced him in game two of the Conference Final, and remained the starting goaltender for the remainder of the series. A loss against the Detroit Red Wings in the first game of the Stanley Cup Final resulted in coach Murray switching back to Snow for the second game. Hextall returned for games three and four, but the Flyers were swept 4–0 by the Red Wings.

In his final two playing seasons, both spent at the Flyers, Hextall made fewer appearances; he played 46 games in 1997–98, and 23 in 1998–99. He maintained a sub-3.00 GAA in each year, repeating the achievement in each of his final five seasons in the NHL having failed to do so in the previous eight seasons. At the end of 1998–99, Hextall was waived by the Flyers, and after going unclaimed in the expansion draft, he announced his retirement on September 6, 1999.

== International career ==
Hextall's first international recognition came when he was named as part of Team Canada's squad for the 1987 Canada Cup. During a practice session, he chopped Sylvain Turgeon's arm with his stick during a scrimmage, claiming that the left wing was too close to the goal. Turgeon missed the tournament with a fractured arm; Hextall was back-up to Grant Fuhr and did not play a single game. He later represented Canada in the 1992 World Championships, playing five games to record one win and a GAA of 2.86 as Canada were eliminated in the quarter-finals.

== Playing style and criticism ==
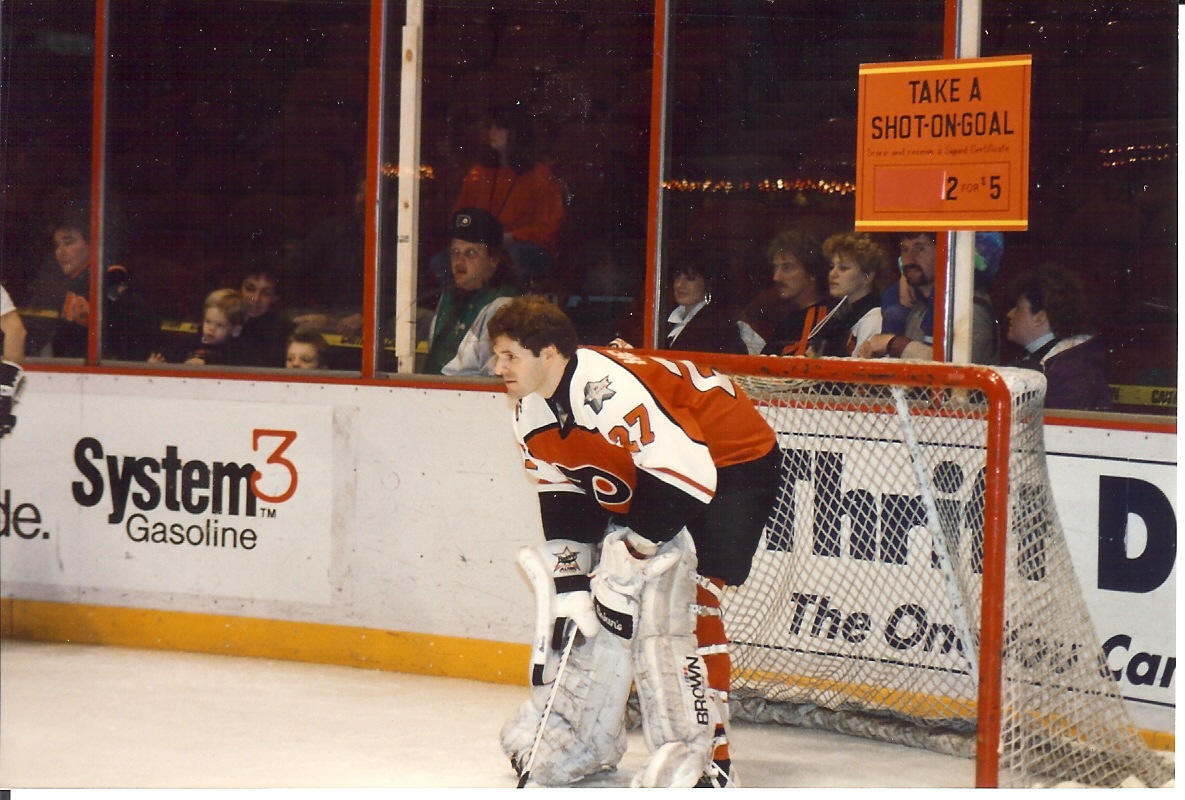
Hextall in goal during the 1992 Flyers' Wives Carnival

Hextall brought a new style of goaltending to the NHL, providing support to his two defencemen due to his willingness to come out of the net and play the puck. He was known for his excellent puck-handling ability. In Hextall's time, goaltenders would limit themselves to stopping the puck behind the net, make short push passes, or at most clear the puck out of the zone with "clumsy" backhands. He distinguished himself by using his stick as a defenceman would; for example, he was capable of starting a counterattack, easily lifting the puck or bouncing it off the glass. Hextall's puck-handling ability meant that it was inadvisable to try a dump and chase strategy of sending the puck in a corner, regaining it, and establishing an attack in the offensive zone, because Hextall would invariably get to the puck first and clear it out of his zone towards a waiting player in the neutral zone. He was described by former NHL player Peter McNab as the "original outlet pass goalie".

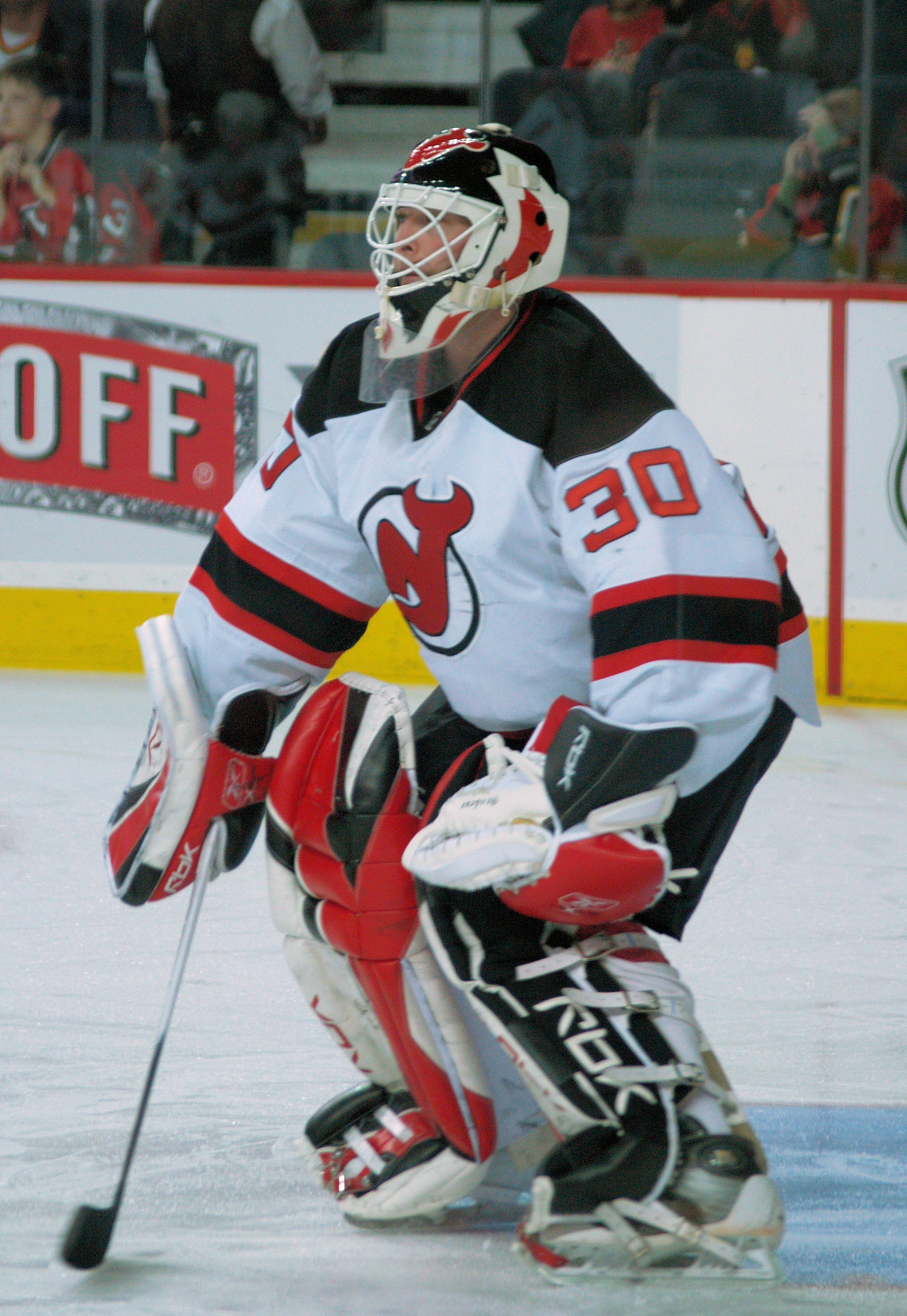
Martin Brodeur admired and adopted Hextall's mobile style.

While playing junior hockey, Hextall's coaches advised him that he would not reach the NHL if he continued to move the puck. Not everyone agreed; NHL goaltender Darren Pang described feeling as if "he had just witnessed Superman flying out of a phone booth" when he saw Hextall's puckhandling ability in a minor league game. Former NHL goaltender Johnny Bower, when scouting for the Toronto Maple Leafs in Brandon, remarked that Hextall would at times let in soft goals, and doubted if he would reach the NHL; Hextall retained a tendency to let in occasional weak goals throughout his career. Hextall claims his adventurous style stemmed from his youth, when he played on outdoor ice rinks with a skater's stick, rather than the heftier goaltender's stick. Martin Brodeur modelled his own play on that of Hextall, saying "I love the fact that he was playing the puck. He was one of the first goalies that came out and played the puck. He was a little rough for my liking, but it was entertaining. The playing of the puck was the big thing." Hextall's mobility provided extra passing opportunities for his defencemen: when killing a penalty they would frequently pass the puck back to him, relieving some of the pressure on his team. He is described on the Hockey Hall of Fame's Legends of Hockey website as being "perhaps the game's most mobile goalie of all time."

Hextall was also notorious for his highly aggressive and intimidating style of play. Frank Orr, a columnist in the Toronto Star, suggested that Hextall's aggressive nature, which resulted in three suspensions of six or more games during his NHL career, was an intentional part of his game designed to protect him. He theorized that because Hextall's style of play frequently took him out of his goal crease, the threat of physical violence lessened the chances of him being challenged by an attacker when out of position. In the 1993 playoff series between the Montreal Canadiens and Hextall's Nordiques, the Canadiens' coach Jacques Demers designed a plan to disrupt Hextall's play after Montreal had lost its two first games to Quebec. He noted that Hextall would be off his game if he were disturbed or bumped. Montreal then won four straight games to win the series in six games. Demers felt that Hextall's emotional play lessened his effectiveness; while acknowledging him as a "great competitor", he felt that "he didn't reach the level of a Grant Fuhr or a Martin Brodeur [because] he lost his cool if you got in his face."

Rogie Vachon, who served as the general manager of the Los Angeles Kings during the early part of the Hextall's playing career, praised his goaltending ability, but felt that his aggressive conduct "shouldn't be in hockey and I think it tarnishes his image, too. He can play. He doesn't need that shit." His view was shared by many, leading Hextall to be tagged as one of the most "revered and reviled" players in the league. Former NHL goaltender John Davidson commented that Hextall "thrived" on being a villain; he further described him as a "great character", and noted that "when he came to town, fans would want to race to the arena to boo him."

== Management career ==
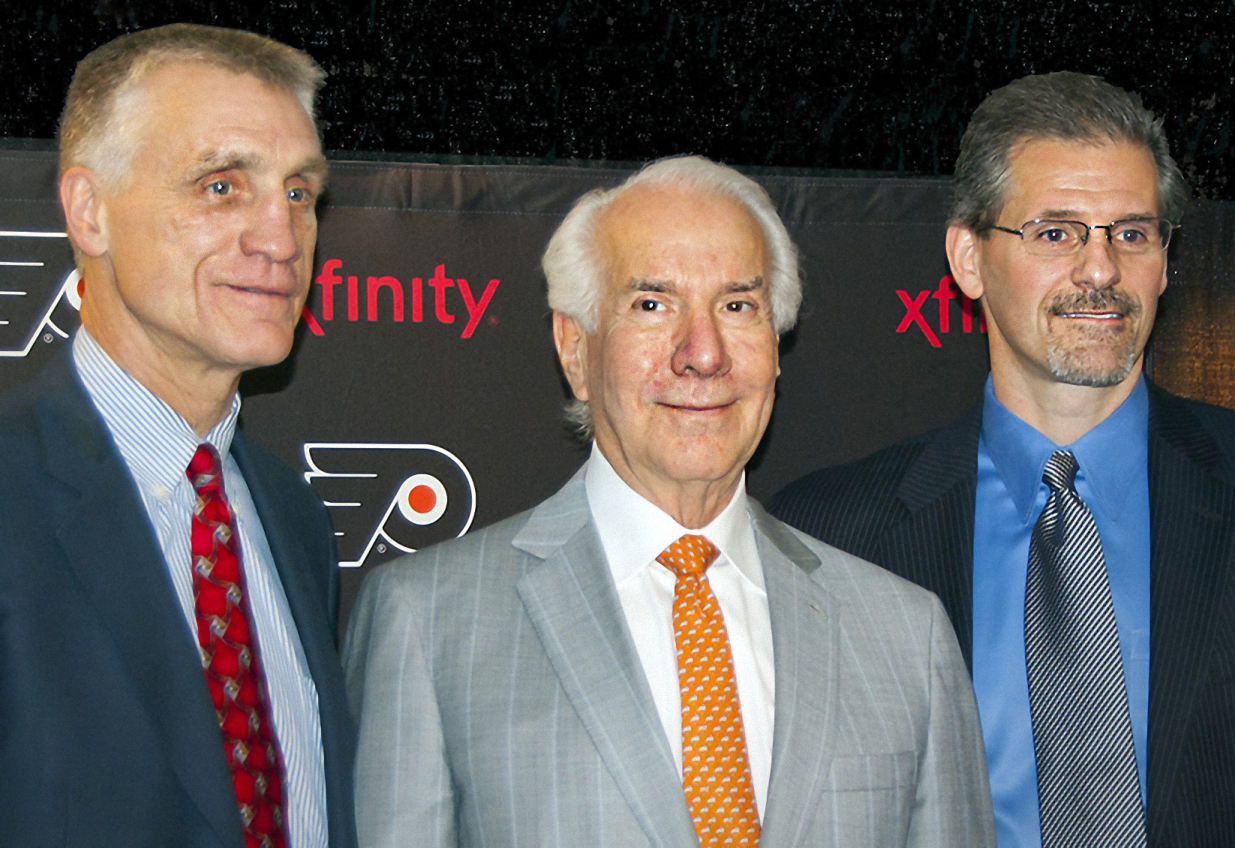
Ron Hextall (r) with Flyers' President Paul Holmgren (l) and Chairman Ed Snider (c) on May 7, 2014, as he was named general manager of the team

Upon his retirement from playing in 1999, Hextall immediately joined the Philadelphia Flyers' staff as a professional scout. He was promoted to director of professional player personnel three years later and was considered by the Manitoba Sports Hall of Fame to be a key factor in the success experienced by the Flyers during the early 2000s when they won the Atlantic Division three times while reaching the Eastern Conference Finals on two occasions. In June 2006, Hextall moved to the Los Angeles Kings to take on the role of vice president and assistant general manager. In addition, Hextall served as the general manager of the Manchester Monarchs of the AHL, the Kings' primary minor league affiliate. On June 11, 2012, Hextall finally won a Stanley Cup, as the assistant general manager of the Kings. On July 15, 2013, Hextall returned to the Flyers and was named assistant general manager and director of hockey operations. On May 7, 2014, Hextall was named general manager of the Flyers, following the promotion of Paul Holmgren to team president. On November 26, 2018, the Flyers fired Hextall as general manager. He was an advisor in the hockey operations department for the Kings.

On February 9, 2021, Hextall was announced as the new general manager for the Pittsburgh Penguins. His tenure in Pittsburgh rapidly became controversial among fans and sports journalists, with The Athletic summarizing his tenure by calling him "one of the worst general managers in franchise history. He may well have destroyed the Penguins with his ghastly record of player transactions." Widely faulted moves through the 2022 off-season included trading Mike Matheson for the older and more expensive Jeff Petry, declining to retain John Marino, and re-signing Kasperi Kapanen and an aging Jeff Carter. The Penguins struggled throughout the 2022–23 season, and by the trade deadline were in danger of missing the playoffs for the first time in sixteen years. Hextall opted to clear salary cap space by trading or waiving a number of players, including Kapanen, but then made the widely criticized decision to trade a 2023 second-round pick to the Nashville Predators for Mikael Granlund. Granlund was considered a declining player with an undesirable contract, and would subsequently score only one goal in twenty games with the Penguins, dubbed "a complete non-factor." The Penguins ultimately missed the playoffs, ending their league-best appearance streak, leading to immediate calls for Hextall to be sacked. On April 14, 2023, the Penguins announced that they had fired Hextall and executive Brian Burke.

== Personal life ==
Hextall married Diane Ogibowski, a former figure skater, and the pair have four children: Kristin, Brett, Rebecca, and Jeffrey.

Brett Hextall was drafted by the Phoenix Coyotes as a sixth-round pick (159th overall) in the 2008 NHL entry draft. He was signed to an entry-level contract with the team in April 2011 and played for four seasons in the minor leagues before retiring. Had he made it to the NHL, Brett Hextall would have become the second fourth-generation player in NHL history, after Blake Geoffrion.

Ron Hextall's cousin Leah Hextall is an announcer for ESPN.

== Awards and honours ==
Award	Year(s)
WHL
East Second All-Star Team	1984
AHL
Dudley "Red" Garrett Memorial Award	1986
AHL First All-Star Team	1986
NHL
Vezina Trophy	1987
Conn Smythe Trophy	1987
NHL All-Rookie Team	1987
NHL First All-Star Team	1987
NHL All-Star Game	1988
Philadelphia Flyers
Bobby Clarke Trophy	1987, 1988, 1989
Inducted into Flyers Hall of Fame	2008
Los Angeles Kings
Stanley Cup champion (as an assistant general manager/vice president)	2012

== Records ==
=== NHL ===
- Most penalty minutes by a goaltender in a single season – 113 (1988–89)

=== Philadelphia Flyers ===
- Most career games played by a goaltender – 489
- Most career wins – 240
- Most career playoff wins – 45
- Most career points by a goaltender – 28
- Most career penalty minutes by a goaltender – 476

== Career statistics ==
=== Regular season and playoffs ===
Bold indicates led league

			Regular season									Playoffs
Season	Team	League	GP	W	L	T	MIN	GA	SO	GAA	SV%	GP	W	L	MIN	GA	SO	GAA	SV%
1980–81	Melville Millionaires	SJHL	37	7	24	0	2001	219	0	6.57	—	—	—	—	—	—	—	—	—
1981–82	Brandon Wheat Kings	WHL	30	12	11	0	1398	133	0	5.71	.864	3	0	2	103	16	0	9.32	—
1982–83	Brandon Wheat Kings	WHL	44	13	30	0	2589	249	0	5.77	—	—	—	—	—	—	—	—	—
1983–84	Brandon Wheat Kings	WHL	46	29	13	2	2670	190	0	4.27	.883	10	5	5	592	37	0	3.75	—
1984–85	Kalamazoo Wings	IHL	19	6	11	1	1103	80	0	4.35	—	—	—	—	—	—	—	—	—
1984–85	Hershey Bears	AHL	11	4	6	0	555	34	0	3.68	.888	—	—	—	—	—	—	—	—
1985–86	Hershey Bears	AHL	53	30	19	2	3061	174	5	3.41	.894	13	5	7	780	42	1	4.27	—
1986–87	Philadelphia Flyers	NHL	**66**	**37**	21	6	**3799**	190	1	3.00	**.902**	**26**	**15**	11	**1540**	**71**	2	2.77	.908
1987–88	Philadelphia Flyers	NHL	62	30	22	7	3560	208	0	3.51	.885	7	2	4	379	30	0	4.75	.847
1988–89	Philadelphia Flyers	NHL	64	30	28	6	3756	202	0	3.23	.891	15	8	7	886	49	0	3.32	.890
1989–90	Philadelphia Flyers	NHL	8	4	2	1	419	29	0	3.67	.880	—	—	—	—	—	—	—	—
1989–90	Hershey Bears	AHL	1	1	0	0	49	3	0	3.67	.880	—	—	—	—	—	—	—	—
1990–91	Philadelphia Flyers	NHL	36	13	16	5	2035	106	0	3.13	.892	—	—	—	—	—	—	—	—
1991–92	Philadelphia Flyers	NHL	45	16	21	6	2668	151	3	3.40	.883	—	—	—	—	—	—	—	—
1992–93	Quebec Nordiques	NHL	54	29	16	5	2988	172	0	3.45	.888	6	2	4	372	18	0	2.90	.915
1993–94	New York Islanders	NHL	65	27	26	6	3581	184	5	3.08	.898	3	0	3	158	16	0	6.08	.800
1994–95	Philadelphia Flyers	NHL	31	17	9	4	1824	88	1	2.89	.890	15	10	5	897	42	0	2.81	.904
1995–96	Philadelphia Flyers	NHL	53	31	13	7	3102	112	4	**2.17**	.913	12	6	6	761	27	0	2.13	.915
1996–97	Philadelphia Flyers	NHL	55	31	16	5	3094	132	5	2.56	.897	8	4	3	443	22	0	2.97	.892
1997–98	Philadelphia Flyers	NHL	46	21	17	7	2688	97	4	2.17	.911	1	0	0	20	1	0	3.00	.875
1998–99	Philadelphia Flyers	NHL	23	10	7	4	1235	52	0	2.53	.888	—	—	—	—	—	—	—	—
NHL totals			608	296	214	69	34,749	1,723	23	2.98	.895	93	47	43	5,456	276	2	3.03	.897

=== International ===
Year	Team	Event	GP	W	L	T	MIN	GA	SO	GAA
1992	Canada	WC	5	1	2	1	273	13	0	2.86
Senior totals			5	1	2	1	273	13	0	2.86

== Bibliography ==
- Allen, Kevin; Bower, Johnny (2002). Without Fear: Hockey's 50 greatest goaltenders. Chicago: Triumph Books. ISBN 978-1-57243-484-4. OCLC 49936232.

Preceded by John Vanbiesbrouck	Winner of the Vezina Trophy; 1987	Succeeded by Grant Fuhr
Preceded by Mark Howe	Winner of the Bobby Clarke Trophy; 1987–1989	Succeeded by Rick Tocchet
Preceded by Patrick Roy	Winner of the Conn Smythe Trophy; 1987	Succeeded by Wayne Gretzky
Preceded by Paul Holmgren	General manager of the Philadelphia Flyers; 2014–2018	Succeeded by Chuck Fletcher
Preceded by Patrik Allvin (interim)	General manager of the Pittsburgh Penguins; 2021–2023	Succeeded by Kyle Dubas
