= Kim Song-soon =

North Korean speed skater (born 1940)

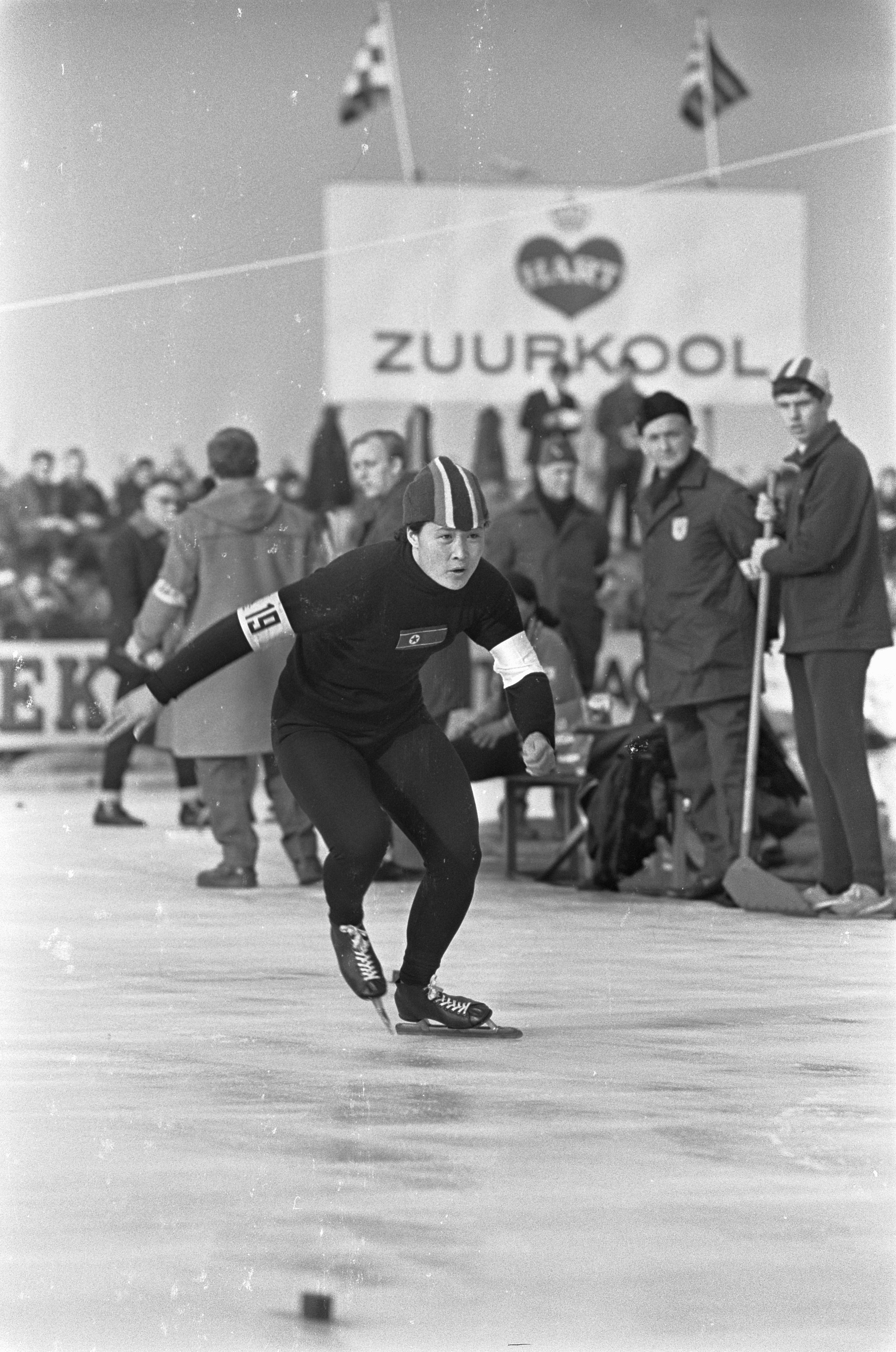

Personal information
- Nationality: North Korean
- Born: 7 June 1940 (age 85) Pyongyang, North Korea

Sport
- Sport: Speed skating

Kim Song-soon (born 7 June 1940) is a North Korean speed skater. She competed in two events at the 1964 Winter Olympics.
