= Terry O'Malley =

Canadian ice hockey player (born 1940)

Olympic medal record

Representing Canada

Men's ice hockey
Bronze medal – third place	1968 Grenoble	Ice hockey

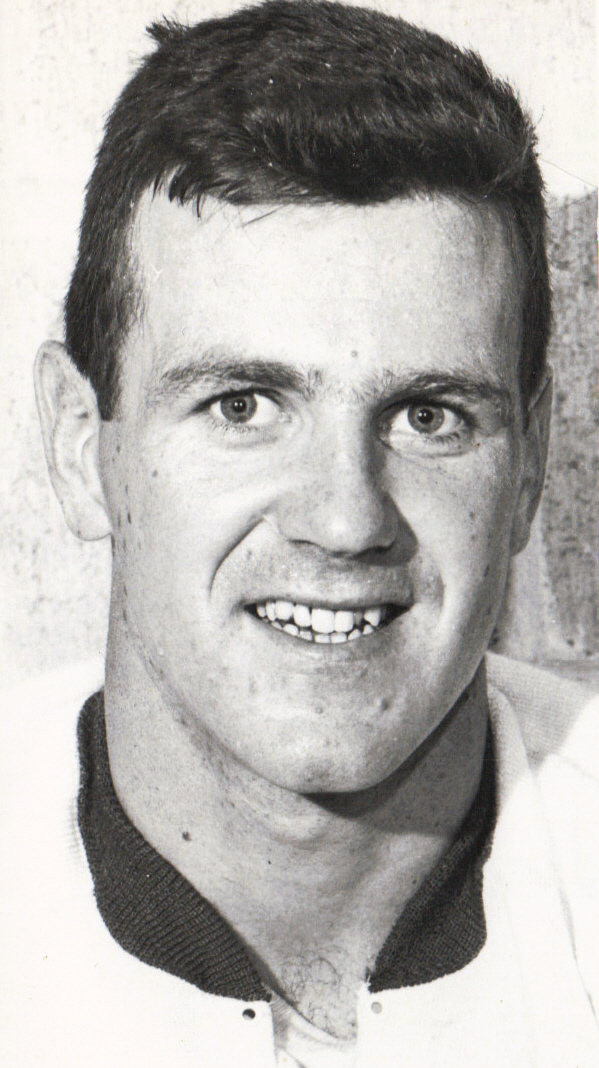
Picture of Canadian Olympic Ice Hockey Defenseman Terry O'Malley

Terrence M. "Terry" O'Malley (born October 21, 1940, in Toronto, Ontario) is a Canadian retired ice hockey player, currently serving as an assistant coach to the Regina Cougars women's ice hockey team of the University of Regina, a position he has held since 2006. He is an Olympian who represented Canada at three Winter Olympics (1964, 1968 and 1980), winning a bronze medal in 1968. A long-time coach for a variety of Notre Dame Hounds' bantam and midget hockey teams at the Athol Murray College of Notre Dame in Wilcox, Saskatchewan, he was inducted into the International Ice Hockey Federation Hall of Fame in 1998.

== Career ==
O'Malley played high school and junior ice hockey at Toronto's St. Michael's College, winning a Memorial Cup Championship in 1961 under the coaching of Father David Bauer. After the team's Memorial Cup run, Father Bauer became the head coach of the University of British Columbia men's ice hockey team, the UBC Thunderbirds. For the 1962–1963 season, O'Malley, along with Ken Broderick, Dave Chambers, and Barry MacKenzie enrolled at the University of British Columbia where they played for the UBC Thunderbirds.

In 1962, he joined the National and Olympic hockey university programs initiated by Father David Bauer in Vancouver, as well as when it moved to Winnipeg in the fall of 1964. His career development centered on education and International hockey including seven years with the Japan Hockey League. He also was head coach of the hockey team at the University of British Columbia. Following his hockey career, he was recruited by Martin Kenney Sr. along with fellow-Olympian Barry MacKenzie to join the Athol Murray College of Notre Dame, in Wilcox, Saskatchewan. He was named the College's President in 2003, a position he held until 2006.

A defensive defenseman, he represented Canada on both Olympic and Canadian National teams from 1964 to 1970, and again in 1980. In 1966 he was captain of Team Canada and in 1968 he won a bronze medal at the Winter Olympics in Grenoble, France.

O'Malley was inducted into the International Ice Hockey Federation Hall of Fame in 1998.

== Personal life ==
O'Malley earned a Bachelor of Arts and master's degree in Canadian history from the University of Manitoba. He later earned a Ph.D. in Sacred Letters from Saint Mark's College in British Columbia.
