= Esko Karu =

Canadian biathlete

Esko Karu (24 April 1946 in Rovaniemi, Finland – 7 December 2003) was a Canadian cross-country skier who competed in the 1968 Winter Olympics.
