= Steve Hutchinson (figure skater) =

Canadian figure skater

Personal information
- Full name: Steven Hutchinson
- Born: May 18, 1949 (age 77) Vancouver, British Columbia, Canada
- Height: 1.85 m (6 ft 1 in)

Figure skating career
- Country: Canada
- Skating club: Kerrisdale FSC

Steven Hutchinson (born May 18, 1949 in Vancouver) is a Canadian figure skater. He is the 1968 Canadian bronze medalist and 1965 Junior national champion. He placed 22nd at the 1968 Winter Olympics.

== Competitive highlights ==
Competition	1964-65	1965-66	1966-67	1967-68
Winter Olympic Games				22nd
Canadian Championships	1st J.	4th		3rd
