= Wendy Thompson =

Canadian speed skater

Personal information
- Born: 26 January 1946 (age 79) Winnipeg, Manitoba, Canada

Sport
- Sport: Speed skating

Wendy Thompson (born 26 January 1946) is a Canadian speed skater. She competed in two events at the 1968 Winter Olympics.
