= Steve Monteith =

Canadian ice hockey player

- Born: September 21, 1943 (age 82) Stratford, Ontario, Canada
- Height: 5 ft 11 in (180 cm)
- Weight: 170 lb (77 kg; 12 st 2 lb)
- Position: Forward
- Shot: Left
- National team: Canada
- Playing career: N/A–N/A

Steve Monteith
Medal record

Representing Canada

Men's Ice Hockey
Bronze medal – third place	1968 Grenoble	Team

Stephen Monteith (born September 21, 1943, in Stratford, Ontario) is an ice hockey player who played for the Canadian national team. He won a bronze medal at the 1968 Winter Olympics.
