= Mary Meyers =

American speed skater (1946–2024)

Personal information
- Full name: Mary Margret Meyers
- Born: February 10, 1946 Saint Paul, Minnesota, U.S.
- Died: March 21, 2024 (aged 78)
Medal record
Women's speed skating
Representing United States
Olympic Games
Silver medal – second place	1968 Grenoble	500 m

Mary Margret Meyers (later Berger, then Rothstein, February 10, 1946 – March 21, 2024) was an American speed skater who competed in the 1968 Winter Olympics. She was born in Saint Paul, Minnesota. In 1968 she won the silver medal in the 500 metres event. Meyers died on March 21, 2024, at the age of 78.

== Sources ==
- Evans, Hilary; Gjerde, Arild; Heijmans, Jeroen; Mallon, Bill; et al. "Mary Meyers". Olympics at Sports-Reference.com. Sports Reference LLC. Archived from the original on 2020-04-18.
