= Roger Bourbonnais =

Canadian ice hockey player

- Born: October 26, 1942 (age 83) Edmonton, Alberta, Canada
- Height: 5 ft 9 in (175 cm)
- Weight: 163 lb (74 kg; 11 st 9 lb)
- Position: Centre
- Shot: Left
- Played for: Edmonton Flyers; Edmonton Oil Kings
- National team: Canada
- Playing career: 1962–1969

Olympic medal record

Men's Ice hockey
Bronze medal – third place	1968 Grenoble	Ice hockey

Ice Hockey World Championships
Bronze medal – third place	1966 Ljubljana	
Bronze medal – third place	1967 Vienna	

Roger Maurice Bourbonnais (born October 26, 1942) is a former ice hockey player who represented Canada in both the IIHF World Championships and the Winter Olympics. His contributions to the sport earned him induction into the International Ice Hockey Federation Hall of Fame in 1999 and the Alberta Hockey Hall of Fame in 2011.

== Career ==
Bourbonnais played junior hockey with the Edmonton Oil Kings between 1960 and 1963. During his final season, he captained the team and guided them to their first Memorial Cup title.

After finishing his junior hockey career, he was invited by Father David Bauer to enroll at the University of British Columbia. During his time there, Bauer coached the team as they represented Canada men's national ice hockey team at the Winter Olympics.

Bourbonnais represented Canada at the Winter Olympics in 1964 and 1968, and also played in the IIHF World Championships in 1965, 1966, and 1967. Under the guidance of Coach Bauer, he helped the team earned two bronze medals. His strong international performance caught the eye of the NHL's Detroit Red Wings, but he declined their offer in order to continue his studies in law.

Bourbonnais was honoured for his outstanding contributions to international ice hockey with his induction into the International Ice Hockey Federation Hall of Fame in 1999, recognizing his success as a key member of Canada's national team during the 1960s. Over a decade later, in 2011, his legacy was further celebrated with his induction into the Alberta Hockey Hall of Fame.

== Personal life ==
His granddaughter, Jaime Bourbonnais, was a member of the Canadian women's national ice hockey team.

Year	Tournament	No	GP	G	A	TP	PIM
1969	World & European Championships - Pool A	19	10	1	3	4	6
1968	Olympic Games—Men's Hockey	8	7	4	2	6	0
1967	World & European Championships—Pool A	14	7	2	3	5	6
1966	World & European Championships—Pool A	14	7	3	4	7	8
1965	World & European Championships—Pool A	14	7	0	0	0	4
1964	Olympic Games—Men's Hockey	8	7	0	5	5	0
