= Bryan Hextall =

Canadian ice hockey player (1913–1984)

- Hockey Hall of Fame, 1969
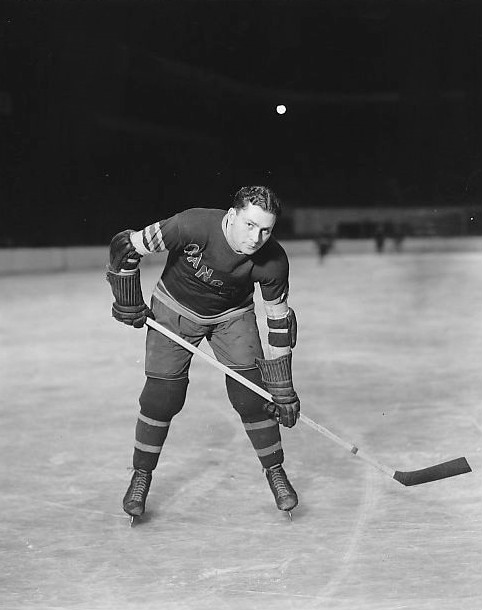
- Born: July 31, 1913 Grenfell, Saskatchewan, Canada
- Died: July 25, 1984 (aged 70) Poplar Point, Manitoba, Canada
- Height: 5 ft 10 in (178 cm)
- Weight: 180 lb (82 kg; 12 st 12 lb)
- Position: Right wing
- Shot: Left
- Played for: New York Rangers
- Playing career: 1933–1948

Bryan Aldwyn Hextall (July 31, 1913 – July 25, 1984) was a Canadian professional ice hockey forward who played for the New York Rangers in the National Hockey League (NHL). Considered one of the top wingers of the 1940s, he led the NHL in goal scoring twice and in points once. Additionally, he was named a first-team All-Star three times, and a second-team All-Star once.

Hextall scored the overtime-winning goal that clinched the 1940 Stanley Cup for the Rangers. He is the father of one of hockey's greatest families, as his sons Bryan Jr. and Dennis, and grandson Ron all had lengthy NHL careers. Bryan Sr. was elected to the Hockey Hall of Fame in 1969.

== Playing career ==
Born in Grenfell, Saskatchewan in 1913, Hextall grew up in Poplar Point, Manitoba. He played his first hockey there, winning the Manitoba juvenile championship in 1929–30. He played junior hockey with the Winnipeg Monarchs in 1931–32 before switching to the Portage Terriers with whom he won the Manitoba Junior Hockey League scoring title in 1932–33.

Hextall began his professional career in 1933–34 with the Vancouver Lions of the North West Hockey League (NWHL). He played three seasons in Vancouver, leading the NWHL in scoring with 27 goals in 1935–36. He moved on to the Philadelphia Ramblers of the International-American Hockey League the following year, again leading the league with 27 goals.

The New York Rangers brought Hextall up for three games in 1937. He made the team full-time in 1937–38. A left-handed shooter, Hextall played his "off wing" – right wing – at a time before it was common practice. He scored at least 20 goals seven times in his career, mainly while playing on the Rangers' top line with Phil Watson and Lynn Patrick.

Hextall led the NHL in goal scoring and was named a first-team All-Star for the first time in 1939–40. He was one of the Rangers' top players during the 1940 Stanley Cup Final against the Toronto Maple Leafs. Hextall scored a hat trick against the Leafs and added an assist to lead the Rangers to a come-from-behind victory in game two of the series, and scored the overtime winning goal in the sixth game that clinched the third Stanley Cup championship in Rangers history. The Rangers would not win another for 54 years.

A second All-Star selection followed in 1940–41 as Hextall again led the NHL in goal scoring and finished in a tie for second in overall points. He led the league in points in 1941–42; his total of 56 standing seven better than second place. Additionally, he was named to the first All-Star team for the third consecutive season.

Hextall scored career highs in goals, 27, and points, 59, in 1942–43 and was again named a post-season All-Star, this time on the second team. In addition to being a top scorer, Hextall was also durable. He appeared in 340 consecutive games for the Rangers between 1937 and 1944. His streak came to an end in 1944 when Canadian war authorities denied him a permit to cross into the United States. The Rangers' attempts to regain his services were unsuccessful, Unable to play in the NHL, Hextall regained his amateur status and played senior hockey briefly with the St. Catharines Saints in the Ontario Hockey Association's senior division.

The conclusion of World War II allowed Hextall to return to the Rangers in 1945–46, however, his return was short-lived. He was hospitalized with a liver ailment, an illness that ruled him out of season after just three games, and led to fears it would end his career. Hextall overcame doctors expectations, appearing in all 60 games for the Rangers in 1946–47. After a final season in the NHL in 1947–48, Hextall split the 1948–49 American Hockey League season between the Cleveland Barons and Washington Lions before announcing his retirement.

Hextall was inducted into the Hockey Hall of Fame in 1969, and is an honoured member of the Manitoba Hockey Hall of Fame. Additionally, the Manitoba hall named him to its all-century second All-Star team.

== Off the ice ==
He was the first of three generations of Hextalls in the NHL. His sons Bryan Jr. and Dennis both had long careers, and his grandson Ron was a longtime goaltender in the league.

Hextall battled circulation problems in his lower legs following his retirement, an ailment that ultimately led to the amputation of both legs below the knee in 1978. Artificial legs allowed him to maintain his hobby of hunting. He died of a heart attack at his home in Poplar Point, Manitoba, in 1984.

== Career statistics ==
=== Regular season and playoffs ===
			Regular season					Playoffs
Season	Team	League	GP	G	A	Pts	PIM	GP	G	A	Pts	PIM
1931–32	Winnipeg Monarchs	WJrHL	4	0	0	0	0	1	2	0	2	0
1932–33	Portage Terriers	WJrHL	12	10	8	18	6	2	0	0	0	4
1933–34	Portage Terriers	MJHL	7	6	4	10	8	—	—	—	—	—
1933–34	Vancouver Lions	NWHL	5	2	0	2	0	—	—	—	—	—
1934–35	Vancouver Lions	NWHL	32	14	10	24	27	8	0	0	0	10
1935–36	Vancouver Lions	NWHL	40	27	9	36	65	7	1	2	3	15
1936–37	Philadelphia Ramblers	IAHL	48	29	23	52	34	6	2	4	6	6
1936–37	New York Rangers	NHL	3	0	1	1	0	—	—	—	—	—
1937–38	New York Rangers	NHL	48	17	4	21	6	3	2	0	2	0
1938–39	New York Rangers	NHL	48	20	15	35		7	0	1	1	4
1939–40	New York Rangers	NHL	48	24	15	39	52	12	4	3	7	11
1940–41	New York Rangers	NHL	48	26	18	44	16	3	0	1	1	0
1941–42	New York Rangers	NHL	48	24	32	56	30	6	1	1	2	4
1942–43	New York Rangers	NHL	50	27	32	59	28	—	—	—	—	—
1943–44	New York Rangers	NHL	50	21	33	54	41	—	—	—	—	—
1944–45	St. Catharines Saints	OHA Sr	1	0	1	1	0	—	—	—	—	—
1945–46	New York Rangers	NHL	3	0	1	1	0	—	—	—	—	—
1946–47	New York Rangers	NHL	60	20	10	30	18	—	—	—	—	—
1947–48	New York Rangers	NHL	43	8	14	22	18	6	1	3	4	0
1947–48	Cleveland Barons	AHL	32	12	17	29	14	—	—	—	—	—
1947–48	Washington Lions	AHL	25	6	6	12	2	—	—	—	—	—
NHL totals			449	187	175	362	227	37	8	9	17	19

Preceded by Bill Cowley	NHL Scoring Champion; 1942	Succeeded by Doug Bentley
