= Paul Conlin =

Canadian ice hockey player

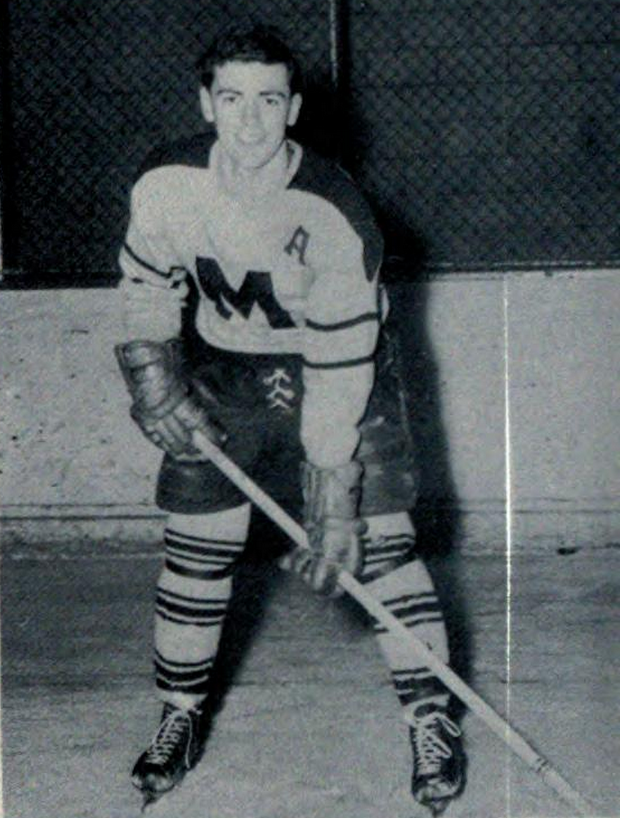
- with the St. Michaels Majors, c. 1962

Personal information
- Born: January 26, 1943 (age 83) Lucan Biddulph, Ontario, Canada
- Height: 5 ft 10 in (1.78 m)
- Weight: 185 lb (84 kg)

Sport
- Country: Canada
- Sport: Ice hockey
Medal record
Men's ice hockey
Representing Canada
Olympic Games
| Bronze medal – third place | 1968 Grenoble | Team |

Paul Joseph D. Conlin (born January 26, 1943) is a Canadian ice hockey player who played for the St. Michael's Majors and Canadian national team. He scored the game-winning goal in the 1961 Memorial Cup for the St. Mike's Majors. He played for Canada in the 1964 and 1968 Olympics and won a bronze medal at the 1968 Winter Olympics. He is a lawyer practising in Ottawa, Ontario. In 2012 he was inducted into the Lucan Hall of Fame.
