= Ray Cadieux =

Canadian ice hockey player

- Born: December 27, 1941 (age 84) Ottawa, Ontario, Canada
- Height: 5 ft 10 in (178 cm)
- Weight: 170 lb (77 kg; 12 st 2 lb)
- Position: Right wing
- National team: Canada
- Playing career: 1963–1972

Ray Cadieux
Medal record

Representing Canada

Men's Ice Hockey
Bronze medal – third place	1968 Grenoble	Team

Raymond Cadieux (born December 27, 1941) is a Canadian former ice hockey player who played for the Canadian national team. He won a bronze medal at the 1968 Winter Olympics.

After his years with the national team: "A chartered accountant, Ray Cadieux remained in Winnipeg where he has been a long-time volunteer for CAA Manitoba and Misericordia Health Centre."
