= Bryan Hextall Jr. =

Canadian ice hockey player

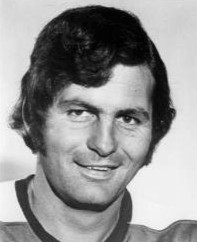
- Hextall as a member of the Pittsburgh Penguins, 1973.
- Born: May 23, 1941 (age 83); Winnipeg, Manitoba, Canada
- Height: 5 ft 11 in (180 cm)
- Weight: 170 lb (77 kg; 12 st 2 lb)
- Position: Centre
- Shot: Left
- Played for: New York Rangers; Pittsburgh Penguins; Atlanta Flames; Detroit Red Wings; Minnesota North Stars
- Playing career: 1961–1976

Bryan Lee Hextall Jr. (born May 23, 1941) is a Canadian former professional ice hockey forward who played in the National Hockey League from 1962 to 1976. Hextall comes from a family rich in the history of hockey. The son of Bryan Hextall, brother of Dennis Hextall, father of Ron Hextall, and grandfather of Brett Hextall, he played the majority of his NHL career with the Pittsburgh Penguins. He spent time with the New York Rangers, Atlanta Flames, Detroit Red Wings, and the Minnesota North Stars, as well as with additional teams in the American Hockey League, WHL, CSHL, and the EPHL. He retired from the NHL after 549 games, with a total of 99 goals, 161 assists, 260 points, and 736 penalty minutes.

== Career statistics ==
=== Regular season and playoffs ===
| | | | Regular season | | | | | Playoffs |
| Season | Team | League | GP | G | A | Pts | PIM | GP | G | A | Pts | PIM |
|---|---|---|---|---|---|---|---|---|---|---|---|---|
| 1958–59 | Brandon Wheat Kings | MJHL | 30 | 19 | 23 | 42 | 15 | 3 | 1 | 1 | 2 | 0 |
| 1959–60 | Brandon Wheat Kings | MJHL | 29 | 22 | 25 | 47 | 33 | 22 | 15 | 14 | 29 | 12 |
| 1960–61 | Brandon Wheat Kings | MJHL | 31 | 22 | 35 | 57 | 54 | 9 | 7 | 7 | 14 | 10 |
| 1960–61 | Winnipeg Rangers | M-Cup | — | — | — | — | — | 5 | 4 | 1 | 5 | 15 |
| 1960–61 | Edmonton Oil Kings | M-Cup | — | — | — | — | — | 5 | 2 | 2 | 4 | 0 |
| 1961–62 | Kitchener Beavers | EPHL | 56 | 22 | 23 | 45 | 48 | 7 | 1 | 0 | 1 | 0 |
| 1962–63 | Baltimore Clippers | AHL | 50 | 8 | 14 | 22 | 26 | — | — | — | — | — |
| 1962–63 | New York Rangers | NHL | 21 | 0 | 2 | 2 | 10 | — | — | — | — | — |
| 1963–64 | Baltimore Clippers | AHL | 54 | 10 | 12 | 22 | 39 | — | — | — | — | — |
| 1964–65 | Baltimore Clippers | AHL | 71 | 13 | 30 | 43 | 46 | 5 | 0 | 2 | 2 | 6 |
| 1965–66 | Vancouver Canucks | WHL | 41 | 8 | 20 | 28 | 37 | 7 | 3 | 1 | 4 | 23 |
| 1966–67 | Vancouver Canucks | WHL | 61 | 14 | 42 | 56 | 60 | 8 | 3 | 5 | 8 | 11 |
| 1967–68 | Rochester Americans | AHL | 72 | 24 | 47 | 71 | 134 | 11 | 4 | 10 | 14 | 13 |
| 1968–69 | Vancouver Canucks | WHL | 70 | 22 | 56 | 78 | 104 | 8 | 4 | 7 | 11 | 22 |
| 1969–70 | Pittsburgh Penguins | NHL | 66 | 12 | 19 | 31 | 87 | 10 | 0 | 1 | 1 | 34 |
| 1970–71 | Pittsburgh Penguins | NHL | 76 | 16 | 32 | 48 | 133 | — | — | — | — | — |
| 1971–72 | Pittsburgh Penguins | NHL | 78 | 20 | 24 | 44 | 126 | 4 | 0 | 2 | 2 | 9 |
| 1972–73 | Pittsburgh Penguins | NHL | 78 | 21 | 33 | 54 | 113 | — | — | — | — | — |
| 1973–74 | Pittsburgh Penguins | NHL | 37 | 2 | 7 | 9 | 39 | — | — | — | — | — |
| 1973–74 | Atlanta Flames | NHL | 40 | 2 | 4 | 6 | 55 | 4 | 0 | 1 | 1 | 16 |
| 1974–75 | Atlanta Flames | NHL | 74 | 18 | 16 | 34 | 62 | — | — | — | — | — |
| 1975–76 | Detroit Red Wings | NHL | 21 | 0 | 4 | 4 | 29 | — | — | — | — | — |
| 1975–76 | Minnesota North Stars | NHL | 58 | 8 | 20 | 28 | 84 | — | — | — | — | — |
| 1977–78 | Brandon Olympics | CSHL | 30 | 7 | 34 | 41 | 45 | — | — | — | — | — |
| NHL totals | | | 549 | 99 | 161 | 260 | 738 | 18 | 0 | 4 | 4 | 59 |

== Awards and achievements ==
- Calder Cup Championship AHL (1968)
- WHL Championship (1969)
- Honoured Member of the Manitoba Hockey Hall of Fame

== See also ==
- Notable families in the NHL
