= Sweden at the 1968 Winter Olympics =

- IOC code: SWE
- NOC: Swedish Olympic Committee
- Website: www.sok.se (in Swedish and English)

in Grenoble
- Competitors: 68 (59 men, 9 women) in 9 sports
- Flag bearer: Barbro Martinsson (Cross-country skiing)
- Medals Ranked 7th: Gold 3 Silver 2 Bronze 3 Total 8

Winter Olympics appearances (overview)
- 1924; 1928; 1932; 1936; 1948; 1952; 1956; 1960; 1964; 1968; 1972; 1976; 1980; 1984; 1988; 1992; 1994; 1998; 2002; 2006; 2010; 2014; 2018; 2022; 2026

Sweden competed at the 1968 Winter Olympics in Grenoble, France.

== Medalists ==
Medal	Name	Sport	Event
Gold	Toini Gustafsson	Cross-country skiing	Women's 5 km
Gold	Toini Gustafsson	Cross-country skiing	Women's 10 km
Gold	Johnny Höglin	Speed skating	Men's 10 000 m
Silver	Jan Halvarsson; Bjarne Andersson; Gunnar Larsson; Assar Rönnlund	Cross-country skiing	Men's 4 × 10 km relay
Silver	Britt Strandberg; Toini Gustafsson; Barbro Martinsson	Cross-country skiing	Women's 3 x 5 km relay
Bronze	Lars-Göran Arwidson; Tore Eriksson; Olle Petrusson; Holmfrid Olsson	Biathlon	Men's 4 x 7.5 km relay
Bronze	Gunnar Larsson	Cross-country skiing	Men's 15 km
Bronze	Örjan Sandler	Speed skating	Men's 10 000 m

== Alpine skiing ==
Men

Athlete	Event	Race 1		Race 2		Total	
Athlete	Event	Time	Rank	Time	Rank	Time	Rank
Per-Olov Richardsson	Downhill					2:09.83	43
Rune Lindström	Downhill					2:05.69	29
Lars Olsson	Giant Slalom	1:48.69	28	DSQ	–	DSQ	–
Bengt-Erik Grahn	Giant Slalom	1:48.68	27	1:57.78	54	3:46.46	39
Olle Rolén	Giant Slalom	1:47.52	22	1:50.83	22	3:38.35	20
Rune Lindström	Giant Slalom	1:46.94	17	1:50.11	17	3:37.05	16

Men's slalom

Athlete	Heat 1		Heat 2		Final					
Athlete	Time	Rank	Time	Rank	Time 1	Rank	Time 2	Rank	Total	Rank
Per-Olov Richardsson	54.83	2 QF	–	–	52.46	28	DSQ	–	DSQ	–
Bengt-Erik Grahn	54.28	1 QF	–	–	49.74	3	DSQ	–	DSQ	–
Olle Rolén	54.15	1 QF	–	–	51.77	22	DSQ	–	DSQ	–
Rune Lindström	53.85	2 QF	–	–	51.19	15	50.80	8	1:41.99	11

Women

Athlete	Event	Race 1		Race 2		Total	
Athlete	Event	Time	Rank	Time	Rank	Time	Rank
Ingrid Sundberg	Giant Slalom					2:08.54	35
Ingrid Sundberg	Slalom	46.91	27	52.65	23	1:39.56	21

== Biathlon ==
Men

Event	Athlete	Time	Penalties	Adjusted time ^{1}	Rank
20 km	Nore Westin	1'21:09.4	7	1'28:09.4	30
20 km	Holmfrid Olsson	1'19:01.8	6	1'25:01.8	20
20 km	Olle Petrusson	1'18:31.2	6	1'24:31.2	19
20 km	Lars-Göran Arwidson	1'18:08.9	6	1'24:08.9	17

^{1} One minute added per close miss (a hit in the outer ring), two minutes added per complete miss.

Men's 4 x 7.5 km relay

Athletes	Race		
Athletes	Misses ^{2}	Time	Rank
Lars-Göran Arwidson; Tore Eriksson; Olle Petrusson; Holmfrid Olsson	0	2'17:26.3	3rd place, bronze medalist(s)

^{2} A penalty loop of 200 metres had to be skied per missed target.

== Bobsleigh ==
Sled	Athletes	Event	Run 1		Run 2		Run 3		Run 4		Total	
Sled	Athletes	Event	Time	Rank	Time	Rank	Time	Rank	Time	Rank	Time	Rank
SWE-1	Rolf Höglund; Börje Hedblom	Two-man	1:12.77	19	1:13.17	18	1:12.62	14	1:12.63	12	4:51.19	14
SWE-2	Carl-Erik Eriksson; Eric Wennerberg	Two-man	1:12.75	17	1:12.69	14	1:12.84	16	1:13.41	17	4:51.69	18

Sled	Athletes	Event	Run 1		Run 2		Total	
Sled	Athletes	Event	Time	Rank	Time	Rank	Time	Rank
SWE-1	Rolf Höglund; Hans Hallén; Sven Martinsson; Börje Hedblom	Four-man	1:12.20	16	1:09.90	16	2:22.10	16

== Cross-country skiing ==
Men

Event	Athlete	Race	
Event	Athlete	Time	Rank
15 km	Assar Rönnlund	49:25.3	11
15 km	Bjarne Andersson	48:41.1	6
15 km	Jan Halvarsson	48:39.1	5
15 km	Gunnar Larsson	48:33.7	3rd place, bronze medalist(s)
30 km	Ingvar Sandström	1'39:47.5	21
30 km	Bruno Åvik	1'39:38.1	20
30 km	Jan Halvarsson	1'38:23.2	12
30 km	Gunnar Larsson	1'37:48.1	8
50 km	Assar Rönnlund	2'31:19.3	10
50 km	Jan Halvarsson	2'30:05.9	7
50 km	Gunnar Larsson	2'29:37.2	6
50 km	Melcher Risberg	2'29:37.0	5

Men's 4 × 10 km relay

Athletes	Race	
Athletes	Time	Rank
Jan Halvarsson; Bjarne Andersson; Gunnar Larsson; Assar Rönnlund	2'10:13.2	2nd place, silver medalist(s)

Women

Event	Athlete	Race	
Event	Athlete	Time	Rank
5 km	Barbro Tano	17:35.8	18
5 km	Britt Strandberg	17:25.8	15
5 km	Barbro Martinsson	16:52.9	4
5 km	Toini Gustafsson	16:45.2	1st place, gold medalist(s)
10 km	Britt Strandberg	39:25.7	15
10 km	Barbro Tano	39:09.6	10
10 km	Barbro Martinsson	38:07.1	4
10 km	Toini Gustafsson	36:46.5	1st place, gold medalist(s)

Women's 3 x 5 km relay

Athletes	Race	
Athletes	Time	Rank
Britt Strandberg; Toini Gustafsson; Barbro Martinsson	57:51.0	2nd place, silver medalist(s)

== Figure skating ==
Men

Athlete	CF	FS	Points	Places	Rank
Thomas Callerud	27	27	1399.3	241	27

== Ice hockey ==
Summary

Team	Event	First round	Medal round / Consolation round							
Team	Event	Opposition Score	Opposition Score	Opposition Score	Opposition Score	Opposition Score	Opposition Score	Opposition Score	Opposition Score	Rank
Sweden men's	Men's tournament	BYE MR	United States; W 4–3	West Germany; W 5–4	East Germany; W 5–2	Finland; W 5–1	Soviet Union; L 2–3	Canada; L 0–3	Czechoslovakia; T 2–2	4

=== Medal Round ===
Rank	Team	Pld	W	L	T	GF	GA	Pts
1	Soviet Union	7	6	1	0	48	10	12
2	Czechoslovakia	7	5	1	1	33	17	11
3	Canada	7	5	2	0	28	15	10
4	Sweden	7	4	2	1	23	18	9
5	Finland	7	3	3	1	17	23	7
6	United States	7	2	4	1	23	28	5
7	West Germany	7	1	6	0	13	39	2
8	East Germany	7	0	7	0	13	48	0

Sweden – (United States) USA 4:3 (0:0, 4:2, 0:1)
Goalscorers: Nilsson, Wickberg, Hedlund, Bengsston – Falkman, Lilyholm, Nanne.
Referees: McEvoy, Kubinec (CAN)

Sweden – West Germany 5:4 (4:3, 0:0, 1:1)
Goalscorers: Svedberg, Lundström, Nordlander, Olsson, Öberg – Kuhn, Hanig, Reif, Kopf.
Referees: Kořínek, Bucala (TCH)

Sweden – East Germany 5:2 (1:0, 2:1, 2:1)
Goalscorers: Hedlund 2, Wickberg, Lundström, Henriksson – Plotka, Fuchs.
Referees: Seglin (URS), Wycisk (POL)

Sweden – Finland 5:1 (1:0, 2:1, 2:0)
Goalscorers: Wickberg 2, Granholm, Nillsson, Bengsston – Oksanen.
Referees: Kubinec (CAN), Kořínek (TCH)

(Soviet Union) USSR – Sweden 3:2 (1:1, 0:0, 2:1)
Goalscorers: Firsov 2, Blinov – Öberg, Svedberg.
Referees: Kubinec (CAN), Kořínek (TCH)

Sweden – Canada 0:3 (0:2, 0.0, 0:1)
Goalscorers: Johnston, G. Pinder, O‘Shea.
Referees: Sillankorva (FIN), Kořínek (TCH)

Czechoslovakia – Sweden 2:2 (1:1, 1:0, 0:1)
Goalscorers: Golonka, Hrbatý – Bengtsson, Henriksson.
Referees: Trumble (USA), Sillankorva (FIN)

=== Contestants ===
4. SWEDEN
Goaltenders: Leif Holmqvist, Hans Dahllöf.
Defence: Arne Carlsson, Nils Johansson, Bert-Olov Nordlander, Lars-Erik Sjöberg, Roland Stoltz, Lennart Svedberg.
Forwards: Folke Bengtsson, Svante Granholm, Henric Hedlund, Leif Henriksson, Tord Lundström, Lars-Göran Nilsson, Roger Olsson, Björn Palmqvist, Håkan Wickberg, Carl-Göran Öberg.
Coach: Arne Strömberg.

== Luge ==
Men

Athlete	Run 1		Run 2		Run 3		Total	
Athlete	Time	Rank	Time	Rank	Time	Rank	Time	Rank
Ivar Bjare	1:00.73	34	1:01.44	36	1:00.63	33	3:02.80	32
Per-Ulf Helander	1:00.25	31	1:01.67	37	1:01.20	34	3:03.12	34
Hans Sahlin	59.12	24	59.36	22	59.98	28	2:58.46	25
Jan Nilsson	59.00	20	59.67	27	59.24	23	2:57.91	23

(Men's) Doubles

Athletes	Run 1		Run 2		Total	
Athletes	Time	Rank	Time	Rank	Time	Rank
Ivar Bjare; Jan Nilsson	51.04	13	50.52	13	1:41.56	13

Women

Athlete	Run 1		Run 2		Run 3		Total	
Athlete	Time	Rank	Time	Rank	Time	Rank	Time	Rank
Berit Salomonsson	50.89	14	51.35	17	51.31	13	2:33.55	13

== Ski jumping ==
Athlete	Event	Jump 1		Jump 2		Total	
Athlete	Event	Distance	Points	Distance	Points	Points	Rank
Ulf Norberg	Normal hill	65.5	82.6	66.0	84.4	167.0	48
Thord Karlsson	Normal hill	67.5	85.8	69.5	90.0	175.8	43
Mats Östman	Normal hill	67.5	87.8	64.0	77.7	165.5	49
Kurt Elimä	Normal hill	71.0	95.4	69.5	90.5	185.9	37
Mats Östman	Large hill	83.0	76.6	79.5	72.2	148.8	52
Kjell Sjöberg	Large hill	85.5	86.1	73.0	59.1	145.2	53
Kurt Elimä	Large hill	87.5	88.9	85.5	85.1	174.0	37
Thord Karlsson	Large hill	91.0	92.3	87.5	86.9	179.2	32

== Speed skating ==
Men

Event	Athlete	Race	
Event	Athlete	Time	Rank
500 m	Manne Lavås	41.8	24
500 m	Heike Hedlund	41.2	15
500 m	Hasse Börjes	41.2	15
500 m	Håkan Holmgren	40.8	8
1500 m	Göran Claeson	2:08.6	20
1500 m	Manne Lavås	2:07.8	16
1500 m	Örjan Sandler	2:07.0	10
1500 m	Johnny Höglin	2:05.2	5
5000 m	Jonny Nilsson	7:32.9	7
5000 m	Örjan Sandler	7:32.8	6
5000 m	Johnny Höglin	7:32.7	5
10,000 m	Jonny Nilsson	15:39.6	6
10,000 m	Örjan Sandler	15:31.8	3rd place, bronze medalist(s)
10,000 m	Johnny Höglin	15:23.6 OR	1st place, gold medalist(s)

Women

Event	Athlete	Race	
Event	Athlete	Time	Rank
500 m	Ylva Hedlund	49.9	26
500 m	Christina Lindblom-Scherling	47.7	15
1000 m	Ylva Hedlund	1:37.5	19
1000 m	Christina Lindblom-Scherling	1:36.9	15
1500 m	Ylva Hedlund	2:31.5	20
1500 m	Christina Karlsson	2:31.4	18
1500 m	Christina Lindblom-Scherling	2:27.5	9
3000 m	Christina Karlsson	5:17.2	13
3000 m	Christina Lindblom-Scherling	5:09.8	7
