= Luge at the 1968 Winter Olympics – Doubles =

Doubles at the X Olympic Winter Games
- Venue: Villard-de-Lans
- Dates: 18 February 1968
- Competitors: 30 from 9 nations
- Winning time: 1:35.85

Medalists
1st place, gold medalist(s)		Klaus-Michael Bonsack, Thomas Köhler	East Germany
2nd place, silver medalist(s)		Manfred Schmid, Ewald Walch	Austria
3rd place, bronze medalist(s)		Wolfgang Winkler, Fritz Nachmann	West Germany

The doubles luge competition at the 1968 Winter Olympics in Grenoble was held on 18 February, at Villard-de-Lans. With his win, Thomas Köhler became the first person to win in both men's singles (1964) and doubles.

== Results ==
Rank	Athletes	Country	Run 1	Run 2	Total
1st place, gold medalist(s)	Klaus-Michael Bonsack; Thomas Köhler	East Germany	47.88	47.97	1:35.85
2nd place, silver medalist(s)	Manfred Schmid; Ewald Walch	Austria	48.16	48.18	1:36.34
3rd place, bronze medalist(s)	Wolfgang Winkler; Fritz Nachmann	West Germany	48.58	48.71	1:37.29
4	Hans Plenk; Bernhard Aschauer	West Germany	48.70	48.91	1:37.61
5	Horst Hörnlein; Reinhard Bredow	East Germany	48.80	49.01	1:37.81
6	Zbigniew Gawior; Ryszard Gawior	Poland	49.01	48.84	1:37.85
7	Josef Feistmantl; Wilhelm Biechl	Austria	48.81	49.30	1:38.11
8	Giovanni Graber; Enrico Graber	Italy	49.01	49.14	1:38.15
9	Lucjan Kudzia; Stanisław Paczka	Poland	49.09	49.08	1:38.17
10	Ernesto Mair; Sigisfredo Mair	Italy	49.10	49.57	1:38.67
11	Georges Tresallet; Ion Pervilhac	France	49.97	49.29	1:39.26
12	Horst Urban; Roland Urban	Czechoslovakia	50.46	50.02	1:40.48
13	Jan Hamřík; František Halíř	Czechoslovakia	51.85	50.85	1:42.70
14	Ivar Bjare; Jan Nilsson	Sweden	51.04	52.52	1:43.56
-	Mike Hessel; Jim Moriarty	United States	DNF	-	-
