= Avik =

Avik or Åvik are a surname and a given name. Notable people with these names include:

== Given name ==
- Avik Bhattacharya (born 1976), Indian remote sensing specialist, professor at IIT Bombay
- Avik Chowdhury (born 1984), Indian cricketer
- Avik Kabessa, Israeli-American businessman
- Avik Mukhopadhyay, Indian cinematographer
- Avik Roy, Bengali-American journalist, editor, political strategist and investment analyst

== Surname ==
- Bruno Åvik (born 1940), Finnish-born Swedish cross-country skier

== See also ==
- Åvik, a village in Norway
- Aavik
