= Roura (surname) =

Roura is a surname. Notable people with the surname include:

== People with this name ==
- Conrado Roura (born 1996), Argentine rugby union player
- Eudald Carbonell Roura (born 1953), Spanish archaeologist, anthropologist and paleontologist
- Gisela Riera Roura (born 1976), retired Spanish tennis player
- Jordi Roura (born 1967), Spanish football player
- Jorge Roura (born 1946), Spanish luger
- Sergio Roura (born 1972), Spanish swimmer
- Teresa Jordà i Roura (born 1972), Catalan politician
- Trinidad Roura, maiden name of Trinidad Roxas (1899–1995), Philippine first lady

== See also ==
- Roura, French Guiana
