= Luge at the 1968 Winter Olympics – Men's singles =

Men's singles at the X Olympic Winter Games
- Venue: Villard-de-Lans
- Dates: 11–13 February 1968
- Competitors: 50 from 14 nations
- Winning time: 2:52.48

Medalists
1st place, gold medalist(s)		Manfred Schmid	Austria
2nd place, silver medalist(s)		Thomas Köhler	East Germany
3rd place, bronze medalist(s)		Klaus-Michael Bonsack	East Germany

The men's singles luge competition at the 1968 Winter Olympics in Grenoble was held from 11 to 13 February, at Villard-de-Lans. Originally, four runs were scheduled, but poor weather meant that the competition was delayed, and the fourth run was eventually cancelled.

== Results ==
Rank	Athlete	Country	Run 1	Run 2	Run 3	Total
1st place, gold medalist(s)	Manfred Schmid	Austria	57.16	57.73	57.59	2:52.48
2nd place, silver medalist(s)	Thomas Köhler	East Germany	57.68	57.47	57.51	2:52.66
3rd place, bronze medalist(s)	Klaus-Michael Bonsack	East Germany	57.90	57.63	57.80	2:53.33
4	Zbigniew Gawior	Poland	57.55	58.35	57.61	2:53.51
5	Josef Feistmantl	Austria	57.78	58.06	57.73	2:53.57
6	Hans Plenk	West Germany	57.30	58.37	58.00	2:53.67
7	Horst Hörnlein	East Germany	57.49	58.04	58.57	2:54.10
8	Jerzy Wojnar	Poland	58.16	58.38	58.08	2:54.62
9	Leonhard Nagenrauft	West Germany	57.87	58.45	58.39	2:54.71
10	Emilio Lechner	Italy	57.94	58.63	58.53	2:55.10
11	Wolfgang Winkler	West Germany	58.08	58.86	58.41	2:55.35
12	Giovanni Graber	Italy	58.09	58.59	58.88	2:55.56
13	Lucjan Kudzia	Poland	59.27	58.46	58.18	2:55.91
14	Helmut Thaler	Austria	58.42	59.03	58.60	2:56.05
15	Jan Hamřík	Czechoslovakia	58.43	58.56	59.07	2:56.06
16	Sigisfredo Mair	Italy	58.22	59.51	58.45	2:56.18
17	Fritz Nachmann	West Germany	58.54	59.05	58.82	2:56.41
18	Raimondo Prinoth	Italy	58.80	59.16	58.89	2:56.85
19	Rolf Greger Strøm	Norway	59.04	59.28	58.67	2:56.99
20	František Halíř	Czechoslovakia	59.07	59.10	58.93	2:57.10
21	Jan-Axel Strøm	Norway	58.84	59.26	59.04	2:57.14
22	Tadeusz Radwan	Poland	59.03	59.01	59.19	2:57.23
23	Jan Nilsson	Sweden	59.00	59.67	59.24	2:57.91
24	Horst Urban	Czechoslovakia	58.93	59.54	59.91	2:58.38
25	Hans Sahlin	Sweden	59.12	59.36	59.98	2:58.46
26	Kim Layton	United States	59.73	59.45	59.46	2:58.64
27	Roland Urban	Czechoslovakia	59.20	59.59	00.24	2:59.03
28	James Murray	United States	00.34	59.94	59.72	3:00.00
29	Georges Tresallet	France	59.75	00.41	00.21	3:00.37
30	Mike Hessel	United States	00.00	00.46	00.16	3:00.62
31	Roger Eddy	Canada	00.69	00.30	00.40	3:01.39
32	Ivar Bjare	Sweden	00.73	01.44	00.63	3:02.80
33	Larry Arbuthnot	Canada	00.10	00.92	01.99	3:03.01
34	Per-Ulf Helander	Sweden	00.25	01.67	01.20	3:03.12
35	Jean-Pierre De Petro	France	01.03	01.24	01.26	3:03.53
36	Werner Sele	Liechtenstein	00.92	01.27	01.69	3:03.88
37	Colin Nelson	Canada	01.13	01.90	01.53	3:04.56
38	Ion Pervilhac	France	01.98	02.99	01.45	3:06.42
39	Richard Liversedge	Great Britain	02.83	02.81	01.40	3:07.04
40	James Manclark	Great Britain	02.99	03.12	01.83	3:07.94
41	Simon Beck	Liechtenstein	03.52	04.54	03.59	3:11.65
42	Jesús Gatell	Spain	03.15	04.38	04.25	3:11.78
43	Jorge Monjo	Spain	05.18	03.35	05.12	3:13.65
44	Jorge Roura	Spain	04.01	05.54	04.42	3:13.97
45	Luis Omedes	Spain	14.43	04.89	05.82	3:25.14
46	Robin Partch	United States	30.36	59.78	59.53	3:29.67
47	D'Arcy Coulson	Canada	02.69	31.24	02.19	3:36.12
-	Julius Schädler	Liechtenstein	DNF	-	-	-
-	Peter Kretauer	Austria	DQ	-	-	-
-	Wolfgang Scheidel	East Germany	DQ	-	-	-
