= Helena Macher =

Polish luger

Medal record

Luge

European Championships
Bronze medal – third place	1967 Königssee	Women's singles

Helena Macher (born 17 October 1937) is a Polish luger who competed in the late 1960s. She won the bronze medal in the women's singles event at the 1967 FIL European Luge Championships in Königssee, West Germany.

At the 1968 Winter Olympics in Grenoble, France, she originally finished seventh in the women's singles event, but was awarded fourth place upon the disqualifications of the East German team of Ortrun Enderlein (who finished first), Anna-Maria Müller (second), and Angela Knösel (fourth) when the East Germans were discovered to have their runners being illegally heated. Macher also finished eighth in the women's singles event at the 1964 Winter Olympics in Innsbruck.
