= Aavik =

Estonian-Norwegian family name

Origin
- Languages: Estonian, Norwegian
- Region of origin: Estonia, Norway

Aavik is an Estonian and Norwegian surname . In Estonian Aavik is a variation of Haavik, meaning "aspen forest". Notable people with the surname include:

- Arvi Aavik (born 1969), Estonian wrestler
- Asbjørn Aavik (1902–1997), Norwegian Lutheran missionary
- Edgar Eduard Aavik (1913–1998), Estonian-Australian sculptor, member of Six Directions
- Evald Aavik (1941–2024), Estonian actor
- Heldur Aavik or Heldur Jõgioja, Estonian musician, composer, writer, and journalist
- Johannes Aavik (1880–1973), Estonian philologist
- Juhan Aavik (1884–1982), Estonian composer
- Kadri Aavik (born 1980), Estonian sociologist and gender studies scholar
- Priidu Aavik (1905–1991), Estonian painter
- Priit Aavik (born 1994), Estonian swimmer
