= František Halíř =

Czech luger (born 1950)

Personal information
- Nationality: Czech
- Born: 10 May 1950 (age 74); Jablonec nad Nisou, Czechoslovakia

Sport
- Sport: Luge

František Halíř (born 10 May 1950) is a Czech luger. He competed in the men's singles and doubles events at the 1968 Winter Olympics.
