= Jan Nilsson =

Jan Nilsson may refer to:

- Jan "Flash" Nilsson, Swedish race car driver
- Jan Nilsson (luger), Swedish luger
- Janne Nilsson, Swedish politician
