= Simon Beck (luger) =

Liechtenstein luger (born 1947)

Personal information
- Born: 20 December 1947 (age 77); Triesenberg, Liechtenstein

Sport
- Sport: Luge

Simon Beck (born 20 December 1947) is a Liechtensteiner luger. He competed in the men's singles event at the 1968 Winter Olympics.
