= Józef Matlak =

Polish luger

Medal record

Luge

European Championships
Bronze medal – third place	1967 Königssee	Men's singles

Józef Matlak was a Polish luger who competed during the 1960s. He won the bronze medal in the men's singles event at the 1967 FIL European Luge Championships in Königssee, West Germany.
