= Kim Layton =

American luger (born 1942)

Personal information
- Born: 26 November 1942 (age 83) San Luis Obispo, California, United States

Sport
- Sport: Luge

Kim Layton (born November 26, 1942) is an American luger. He competed in the men's singles event at the 1968 Winter Olympics.
