= Roger Eddy =

Roger Eddy may refer to:

- Roger Eddy (luger) (born 1946), Canadian former luger
- Roger L. Eddy (born 1958), member of the Illinois House of Representatives
