= Bernhard Aschauer =

German luger (born 1945)

Personal information
- Nationality: German
- Born: 28 May 1945 (age 79); Schönau am Königssee, Germany

Sport
- Sport: Luge

Bernhard Aschauer (born 28 May 1945) is a German luger. He competed in the men's doubles event at the 1968 Winter Olympics.
