= Enrico Graber =

Italian luger (born 1948)

Personal information
- Nationality: Italian
- Born: 17 June 1948 (age 76); Olang, Italy

Sport
- Sport: Luge

Enrico Graber (born 17 June 1948) is an Italian luger who competed in the men's doubles event at the 1968 Winter Olympics.
