= James Manclark =

British luger (1939–2026)

Personal information
- Full name: James William McKinnon Manclark
- Born: 3 December 1939 Peebles, Scotland
- Died: 10 February 2026 (aged 86) Haddington, Scotland

Sport
- Sport: Luge

James William McKinnon Manclark (3 December 1939 – 10 February 2026) was a British luger. He competed in the men's singles event at the 1968 Winter Olympics.

Manclark worked as a farmer. He discovered luge while on holiday in Switzerland. He later competed in bobsleigh and elephant polo.

Manclark died on 10 February 2026, at the age of 86.
