= Asbjørn Aavik =

Norwegian missionary (1902–1997)

- Born: November 30, 1902; Aavig, Norway
- Died: November 20, 1997 (aged 94)
- Education: Fjellhaug utdanningssenter
- Occupation: Lutheran missionary to China

Asbjørn Aavik (November 30, 1902 – November 20, 1997) was a Norwegian Lutheran missionary to China. He was also the author of approximately forty books.

== Early years ==
Aavik was born in Aavig (in the present-day Lindesnes Municipality), Norway. From 1921 to 1926, he received education at Fjellhaug utdanningssenter in Oslo, a missionary school affiliated with the Norwegian Lutheran Mission.

== Missionary work ==
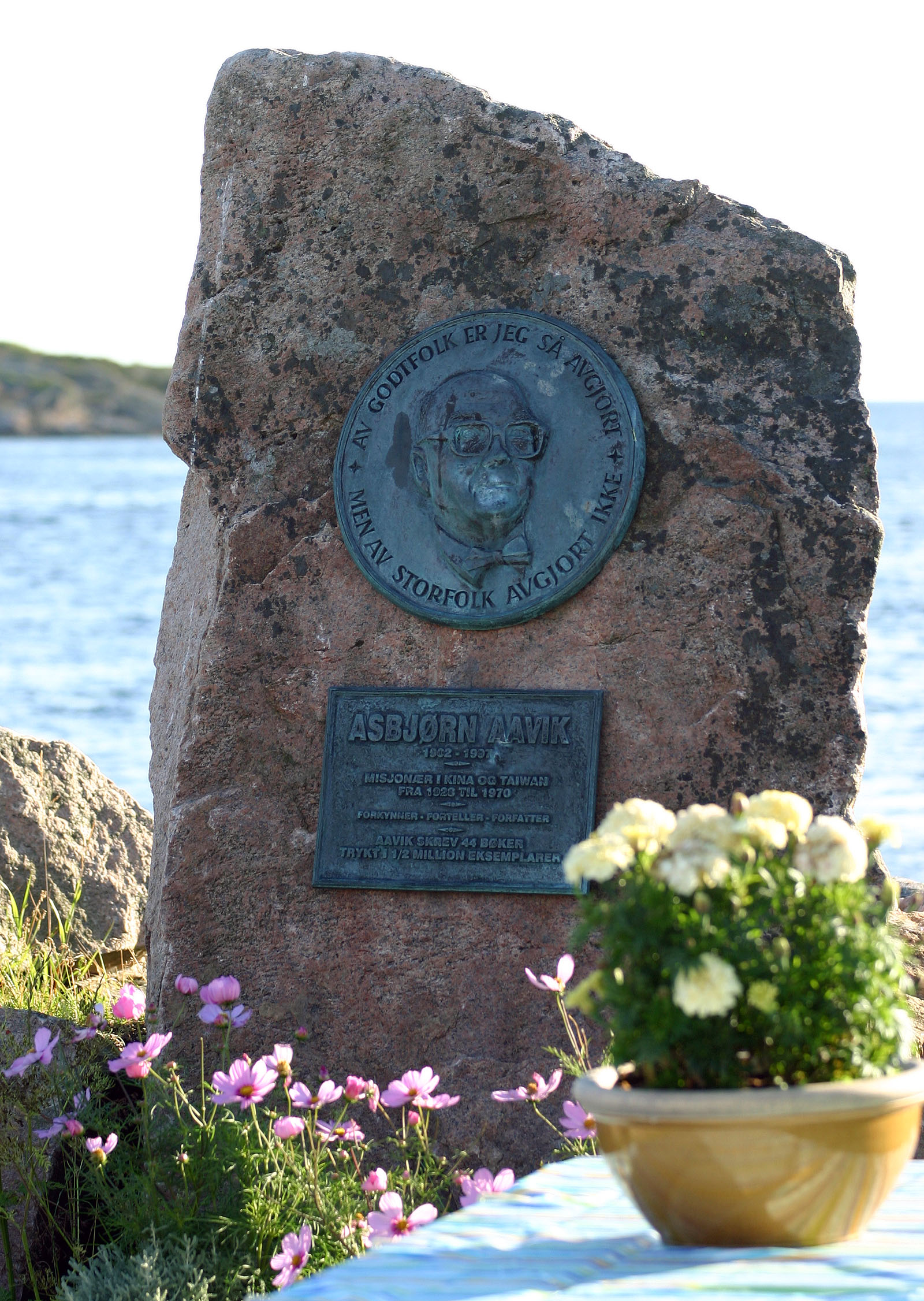
Asbjørn Aavik memorial at Åvik in Lindesnes

He was sent to China in 1928 where he started on the China Mission Association's mission fields around Laohekou in Hubei. Aavik married Ragna Torgersen (1906–1984) in 1932 and later moved to the Yunyang northwestern mission area. The situation was turbulent, not least because of robber bands and the communist insurgency in the 1930s. In 1935 the couple decided to return to Norway.

The planned return trip to China had to be postponed because the missionaries in China warned of increasing uncertainty and unease, but in 1938 Aavik traveled alone, without family, back to the same mission field in China. The Norwegian missionaries would later temporarily and definitely leave this field because of World War II and the subsequent communist advance. Aavik returned home for the second time in 1946.

Aavik still came back to the Republic of China, now Taiwan, where he worked with less interruption from 1952 to 1970. His work consisted partly in teaching at a Bible school at Kaohsiung and at the Lutheran Theological Seminary in Taipei and Taichung. He also became the first principal at the China Lutheran Seminary in Hsinchu.

He was the writer of many missionary books. In the summer of 1999, a memorial stone was unveiled for the missionary in Åvik.

== Selected works ==
=== Best known ===
- Temple of the Spirit'', 1953 (translated to Chinese)
- Holy unrest, 1956

=== Novels ===
- They are waiting, 1940 (published in four editions)
- Nybrott, 1941
- Dalen, 1949 (best novel winner)
- The white river, 1951
- The Red Lotus, 1957
- The earth is bleeding, 1964

=== Autobiographical ===
- Roses in the rain: Young year in China, 1977
- Aavik in maturation: Rich years in China
- Grotid in the storm: War years in China, 1982

=== Other ===
- At the border, 1948
- The struggle for borders. Tanganyika and Christian Mission, 1952
- The shade of the bamboo carpet, 1955
- At the Kingdom Gate, 1959
- The East Comes, 1962
- God of Jacob, 1965
- The Missionary Association in Asia, 1966
- The Kingdom Comes, 1967
- Everyday, 1968
- The Sand by the Sea, 1968
- Elisa – Safat's son, 1969
- The sand was white, 1970
- Window to Hong Kong, 1971
- Golden Sand, 1973
- Window to Japan, 1973
- Wrecked silver: King Saul, 1975
- The China I saw again, 1980
- Years in the sun, Breakthrough in Taiwan, 1984
- Hiking, 1987 (devotional)

=== Articles ===
- Harald Stene Dehlin and Asbjørn Aavik:The priest with the red ads, Luther, 1979 (if Olaf Stromme) ISBN 82-531-4141-6
- "The mission of a track change" I:Norwegian Journal of mission, Årg. 6, No. 2 (1952)
- "A Christian statesman and the world" I:Norwegian Journal of mission, Årg. 17, No. 2 (1963) (If Chiang Kai-Chek)

== See also ==
- Marie Monsen

== Related literature ==
- Gunnar Bråthen:Spirit and mission: the revival of Samba Its mission field in China, 1930–1932, with particular emphasis on how Marie Monsen and Asbjørn Aavik experienced this. Unpublished student assignment, MF, 2001
- Asbjørn Nordgård:The wizards: they taught me something for life and eternity. Lunde, 2005 ISBN 82-520-4840-4
