= Stanisław Paczka =

Polish luger (1945–1969)

Personal information
- Nationality: Polish
- Born: 16 September 1945; Kuków, Poland
- Died: 1 February 1969 (aged 23); Schönau am Königssee, Germany

Sport
- Sport: Luge

Stanisław Paczka (16 September 1945 – 1 February 1969) was a Polish luger. He competed in the men's doubles event at the 1968 Winter Olympics.
