= FIL Junior World Cup Luge on Natural Track =

The FIL Junior World Cup Luge on Natural Track is a competition series organized by the International Luge Federation (FIL) in natural track luge and was used to promote the international development of the sport as a replacement introduced to the Intercontinental Cup (IC Cup, later European Cup) by the FIL. A luge is a small one- or two-person sled on which one sleds supine (face up) and feet-first. A luger steers by using the calf muscles to flex the sled's runners or by exerting opposite shoulder pressure to the seat.

== History ==
This event has been annual from December to February since winter 2014/2015. The overall winners in the disciplines single-seater women, single-seater men and double-seaterare determined for the junior and youth classes. Both men and women can compete in the double-seater, but the participants are almost exclusively men. All athletes with a valid FIL license who are at least 15 years old and not yet 21 years old in the year in which the season ends, are eligible to participate. A maximum of six women in single-seaters, six men in single-seaters and three pairs of two-seaters can participate in a World Cup race per national association.

The result of a World Cup race is determined by the sum of the times achieved in two rounds. In exceptional weather or track conditions, the race can also be decided in a single pass. The starting order in the first run is determined by the progress in the World Cup ranking. The World Cup leader starts last and the athletes with the fewest or no World Cup points start first. The overall result of the previous year is decisive in the first season race. The second round starts after the fallen classification of the first run, so the halftime leader starts last. Before each scoring round, at least one forerunner must be on the track.

== Awarding of points and overall rating ==
For each World Cup race, World Cup points are awarded according to the FIL point scheme. The winner receives 100 points, the second place 85 points, the third place 70 points and the further ranks fewer and fewer points, up to place 39, for which two points are awarded. All athletes from 40th place receive a World Cup point.
