= Svennevik =

Village in Lindesnes Municipality, Norway

Svennevik Svenevig
- Village
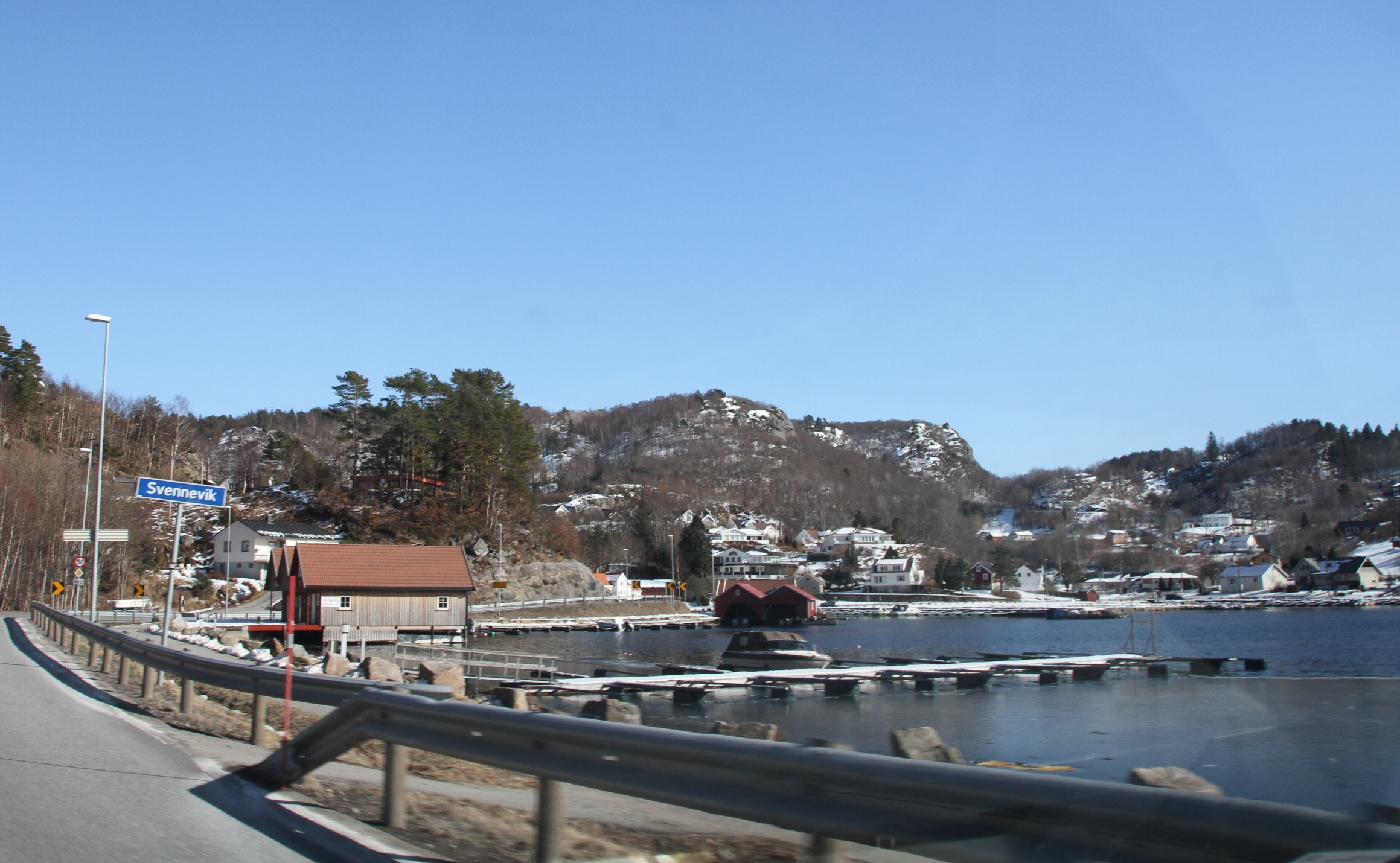
- View of the village
- Interactive map of Svennevik
- Coordinates: 58.04861°N 7.20079°E
- Country: Norway
- Region: Southern Norway
- County: Agder
- District: Lindesnes
- Municipality: Lindesnes Municipality

Area
  - Total: 0.34 km^{2} (0.13 sq mi)
- Elevation: 3 m (9.8 ft)

Population (2025)
  - Total: 388
  - Density: 1,141/km^{2} (2,960/sq mi)
- Time zone: UTC+01:00 (CET)
  - Summer (DST): UTC+02:00 (CEST)
- Post Code: 4521 Lindesnes

Svennevik is a village in Lindesnes Municipality in Agder county, Norway. The village is located on the southern coastline, about 3 kilometres (1.9 mi) east of the village of Høllen on the Lindesnes peninsula and about the same distance northwest of the village of Åvik. The Remesfjorden is located along the west side of the village.

The 0.34-square-kilometre (84-acre) village has a population (2025) of 388 and a population density of 1,141 inhabitants per square kilometre (2,960/sq mi).
