= Wilhelm Bichl =

Austrian luger (born 1949)

Medal record

Luge

European Championships
Gold medal – first place	1967 Königssee	Men's doubles

Wilhelm Bichl (born 3 February 1949 in Hall in Tirol) is an Austrian luger who competed in the late 1960s. He won a gold medal in the men's doubles event at the 1967 FIL European Luge Championships in Königssee, West Germany.

Bichl also finished seventh in the men's doubles event at the 1968 Winter Olympics in Grenoble.
