= Jorge Roura =

Spanish luger (born 1946)

Personal information
- Nationality: Spanish
- Born: 20 June 1946 (age 78)

Sport
- Sport: Luge

Jorge Roura (born 20 June 1946) is a Spanish luger. He competed in the men's singles event at the 1968 Winter Olympics.
