= FIL European Luge Championships 1967 =

The FIL European Luge Championships 1967 took place in Königssee, West Germany. It was the first time the championships were held after being cancelled from 1963 to 1966.

== Men's singles ==
Medal	Athlete	Time
Gold	Leonhard Nagenrauft (FRG)	
Silver	Fritz Nachmann (FRG)	
Bronze	Jozef Matlak (POL)	

== Women's singles ==
Medal	Athlete	Time
Gold	Christina Schmuck (FRG)	
Silver	Angelika Dünhaupt (FRG)	
Bronze	Helene Macher (POL)	

== Men's doubles ==
Medal	Athlete	Time
Gold	Austria (Josef Feistmantl, Wilhelm Bichl)	
Silver	Austria (Helmut Thaler, Reinhold Senn)	
Bronze	Poland (Ryszard Gawlor, Zbigniew Gawlor)	

== Medal table ==
Rank	Nation	Gold	Silver	Bronze	Total
1	West Germany (FRG)	2	2	0	4
2	Austria (AUT)	1	1	0	2
3	Poland (POL)	0	0	3	3
Totals (3 entries)		3	3	3	9
