= Svinør =

Island in Agder, Norway

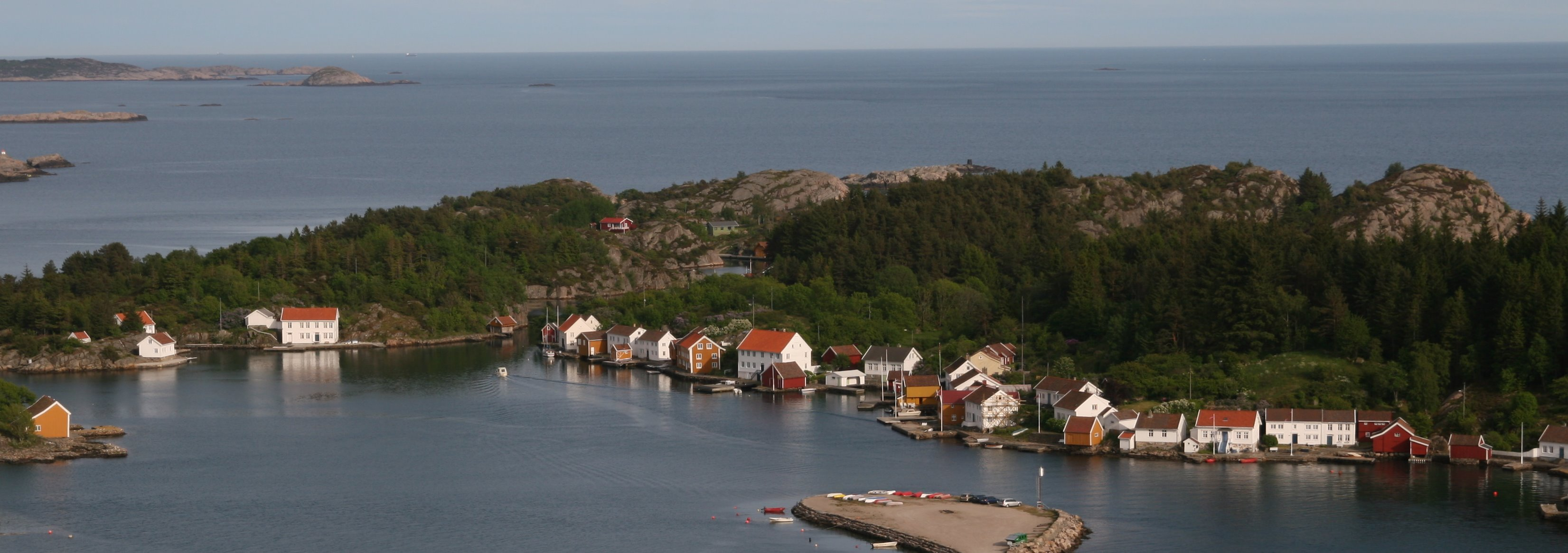
- View of Svinør
- Interactive map of the island

Geography
- Location: Agder, Norway
- Coordinates: 58.02998°N 7.22488°E
- Area: 0.3 km^{2} (0.12 sq mi)
- Length: 1 km (0.6 mi)
- Width: 1 km (0.6 mi)
- Coastline: 3.8 km (2.36 mi)

Administration
- Norway
- County: Agder
- Municipality: Lindesnes Municipality

Demographics
- Population: 0 (since 1993)

Svinør is an island in Lindesnes Municipality in Agder county, Norway. The 0.3-square-kilometre (74-acre) island lies immediately south of the mainland by the village of Åvik. The island essentially forms the southern part of the Åvik village harbour. The island sits about half-way between the Lindesnes peninsula to the west and the town of Mandal to the east. The fishing village is very picturesque due to its wooden houses dating back to the 1700s and 1800s.

== History ==
Svinør was once a very prosperous port with its own customs house. The port was a good port to protect ships in bad weather, especially near the harsh waters surrounding the Lindesnes peninsula (the Norwegian term uthavn meaning "exterior harbor" was used for the harbour). During the early 1800s, there were over 100 residents on the small island, but by 1993, the last permanent resident left the island, leaving the island as a haven for holiday cottages that bring many residents each summer.

== Media gallery ==
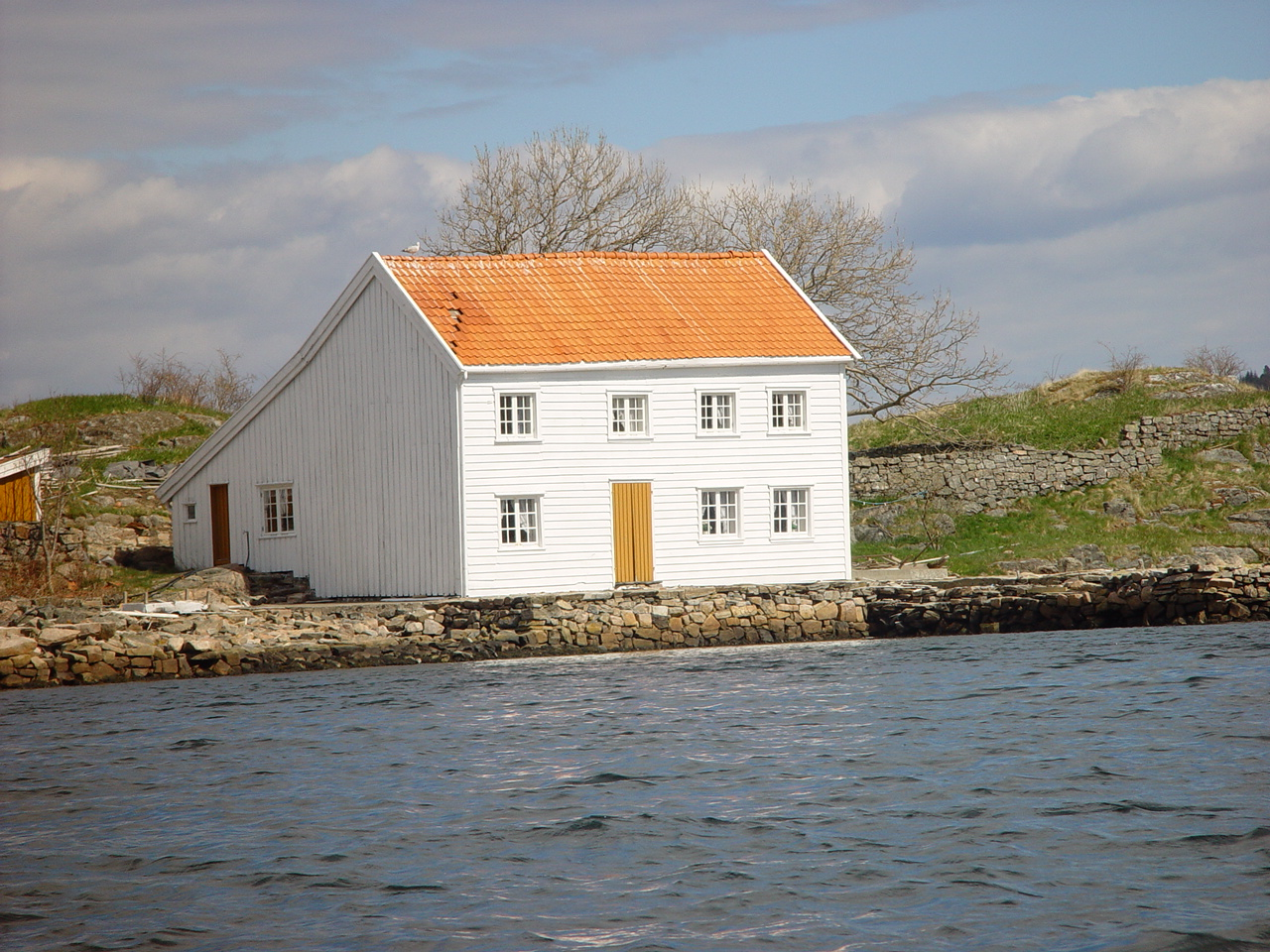
House in Svinør (previously a ship works)

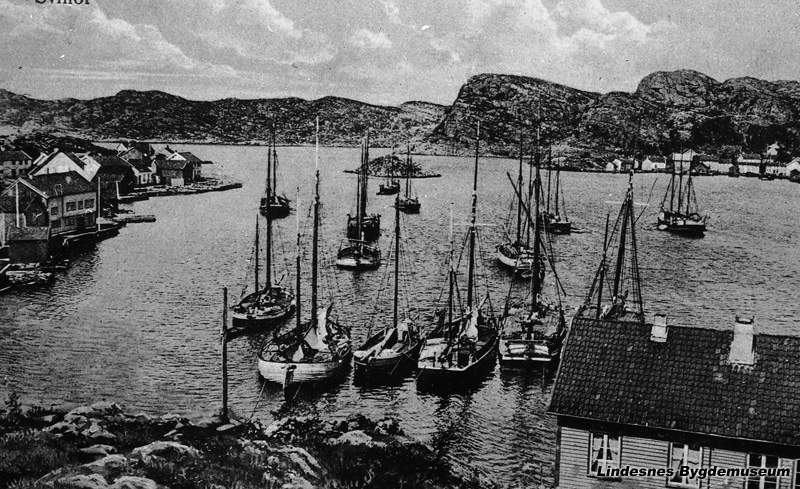
Svinør in the past, in the background we can see Åvik village on the mainland.

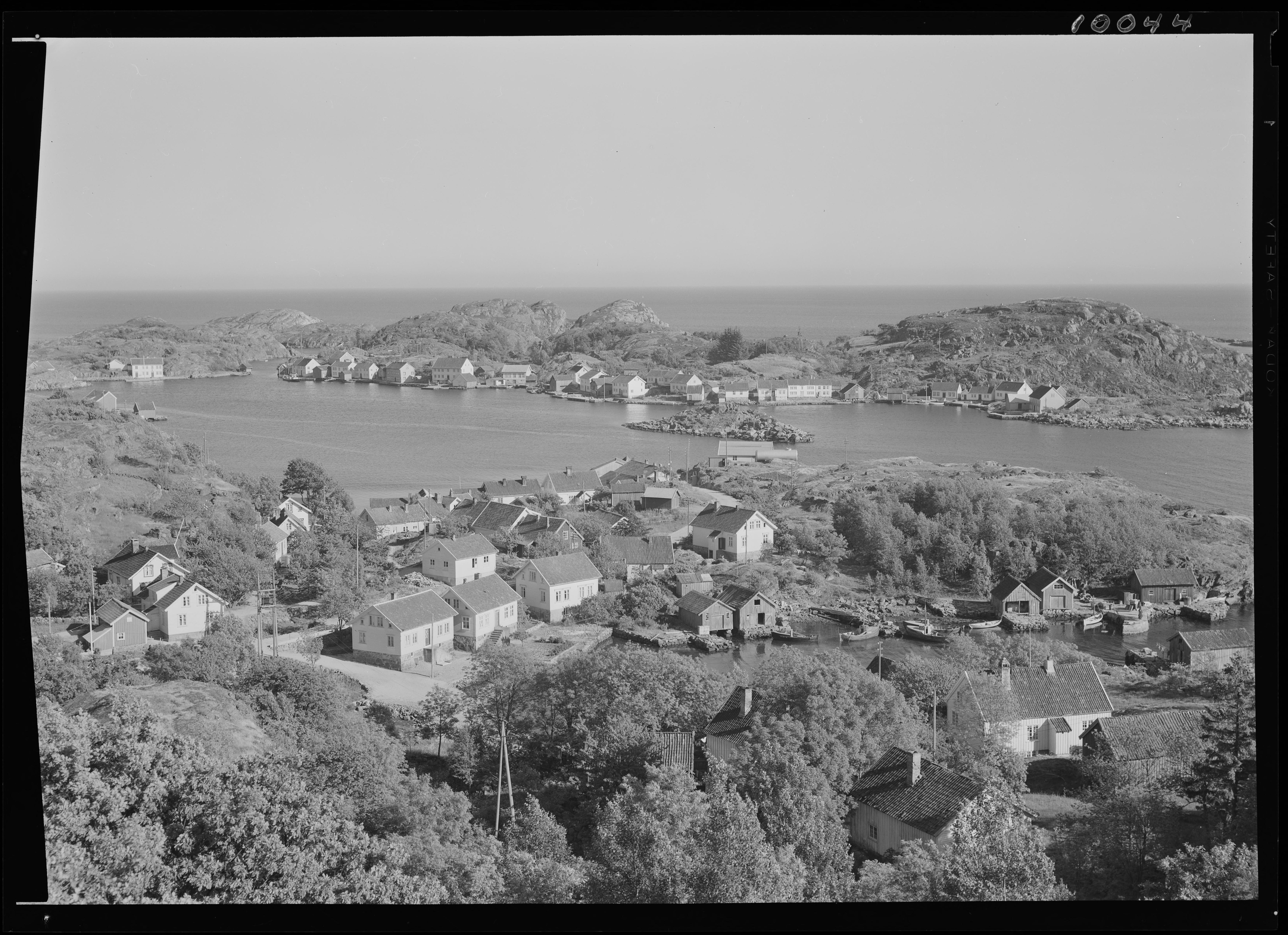
Åvik village in the foreground, Svinør island in the background.

== See also ==
- List of islands of Norway
