= Hans Sahlin =

Swedish luger (1946–2013)

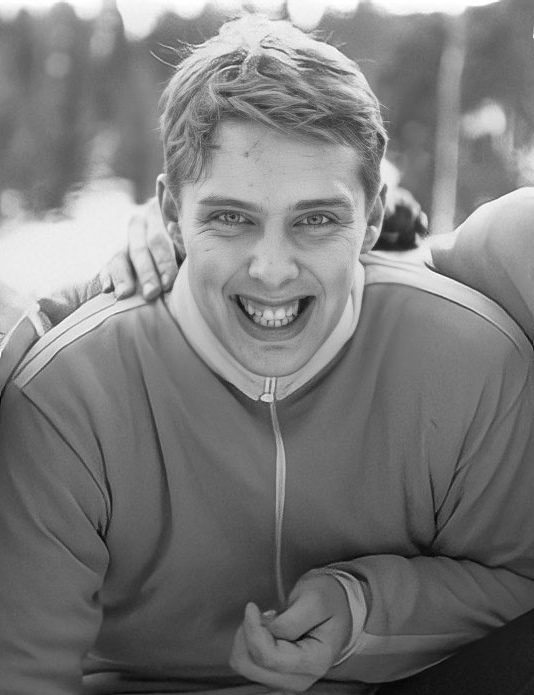

Personal information
- Nationality: Swedish
- Born: 8 May 1946 Östersund, Sweden
- Died: 10 November 2013 (aged 67) Timrå, Sweden
- Height: 182 cm (6 ft 0 in)
- Weight: 83 kg (183 lb)

Sport
- Sport: Luge
- Club: Arta BK, Hammarstrand

Hans Erik Wilhelm Sahlin (8 May 1946 – 10 November 2013) was a Swedish luger. He won the national title in 1967 and placed 25th in the singles event at the 1968 Winter Olympics.
