= Ivar Bjare =

Swedish luger (1943–1995)

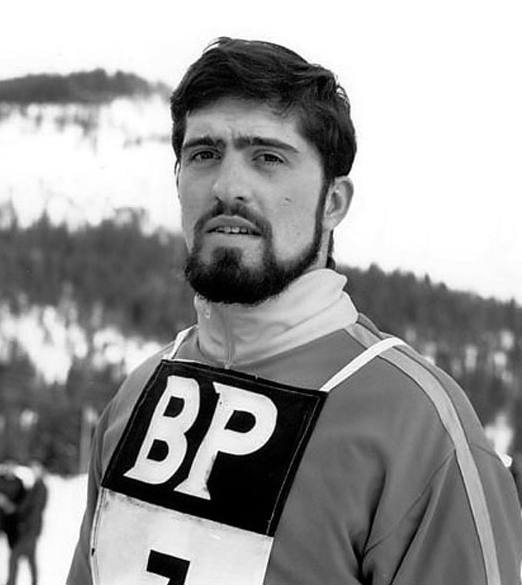

Personal information
- Nationality: Swedish
- Born: 30 April 1943; Stockholm, Sweden
- Died: 24 November 1995 (aged 52); Saltsjöbaden, Sweden

Sport
- Sport: Luge
- Club: Saltsjöbaden's RK

Ivar Bjare (30 April 1943 – 24 November 1995) was a Swedish luger. He competed in the men's singles and doubles events at the 1968 Winter Olympics.
