= Roger Eddy (luger) =

Canadian luger (born 1946)

Roger Eddy (born 13 May 1946) is a former luger who competed for Canada at the 1968 Winter Olympics, in the Luge Men's singles event.

He ranked in 31st position. His first run was 00.69, his second run 00.30, and his third run 00.40, for 3:01.39 overall.

Eddy trained at the first luge run in North America, built in Lolo Hot Springs, Montana in 1965. He was a freshman forestry student from Saskatchewan studying at the University of Montana at the time, and founded the school's first Luge Club with Jim Murray.

After the Olympics, Eddy continued to luge internationally until 1973. He "was named coach of the Canadian national team in 1974".

Eddy went on to a 25-year career with the Parks Canada, including a stint at Glacier National Park (Canada), retiring in 2008.
