= Marie Monsen =

Norwegian missionary

Marie Monsen

Marie Monsen (Chinese: 孟慕貞 or 孟瑪麗; born 1878 in Sandviken, Norway – 1962) was an evangelical Lutheran Norwegian missionary active in North and Central China between 1901 and 1932.

== Career ==
Marie Monsen was born in 1878 in Sandviken, Norway. Monsen started her working life as a graduate teacher before retraining as a nurse and arrived in China on 1 September 1901. She began a three-term, 30-year mission, becoming an important figure in the history of the charismatic renewal in China. While popular with the Chinese, she was nonetheless marginalized by some traditionalists in Norway due to her heterodox Christian beliefs.

Between 1901 and 1932 she worked almost exclusively for the China Mission Association, and became widely acknowledged as one of the matriarchs of the Chinese house church movement, working closely with Asbjørn Aavik, another prominent missionary. In 1935 Monsen joined the free evangelical congregation in Bergen, Norway, having returned home in 1932 to care for her sick parents. She remained active in the intercession ministry, retiring in 1962.

She wrote a short book detailing many of the events that took place during her missionary work in China, entitled A Present Help.

Her remains are held at Solheim cemetery in Bergen, Norway.

== Monument in Bergen, Norway ==
Monsen figures prominently in the introduction of The Heavenly Man, a true account of the life of Liu Zhenying, a contemporary Chinese Christian better known as Brother Yun. In 1999 Yun asked the congregation of a church in Bergen to prepare a monument representing Monsen's missionary work in Henan, his home province. The monument was completed in 2001.
