= Rolf Höglund =

Swedish bobsledder

Personal information
- Nationality: Swedish
- Born: 14 August 1940 (age 84); Finspång, Sweden

Sport
- Sport: Bobsleigh

Rolf Höglund (born 14 August 1940) is a Swedish bobsledder. He competed in the two-man and the four-man events at the 1968 Winter Olympics.
