= Priidu Aavik =

Estonian painter

Priidu Aavik (22 April 1905 – 22 April 1991) was an Estonian painter.

He was born in Novgorod, Russian Empire.

He died in Tallinn.
