= Börje Hedblom =

Swedish bobsledder (1940–1976)

Personal information
- Nationality: Swedish
- Born: 13 March 1940; Stockholm, Sweden
- Died: 28 December 1976 (aged 36); Stockholm, Sweden

Sport
- Sport: Bobsleigh

Börje Hedblom (13 March 1940 – 28 December 1976) was a Swedish bobsledder. He competed in the two-man and the four-man events at the 1968 Winter Olympics.
