= Avik Kabessa =

Chief Executive Officer of Carmel (car service company)

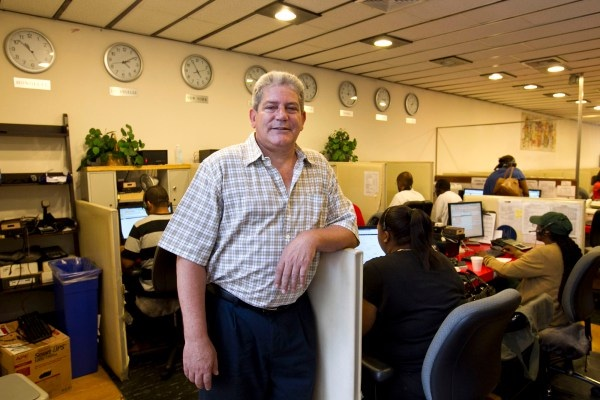
- Born: Israel
- Occupation: Businessman

Avik Kabessa is the CEO of car service company Carmel.

== History ==
=== Veterinary clinic ===
Kabessa received his degree in veterinary medicine at Ross University School of Medicine in St. Kitts in 1994. In 1996, he founded the Medical Center for Animals in Ashqelon, Israel.

=== Positions and contributions ===
Kabessa is the president and co-founder of Livery Roundtable (LRT). Created in 2008, LRT represents the interest of 240 bases with 14,000 drivers. The LRT is responsible for many local and state laws that have bettered the livery driver working conditions. In 2009, Kabessa was active in promulgating a law that on workers compensation insurance. The law created a workers compensation fund for 23,000 livery drivers. Avik is the Chairman of the New York State Independent Livery Benefit Fund. In 2011, he was awarded Livery Round Table Honoree.
