= Jan Nilsson (luger) =

Swedish luger (born 1947)

Personal information
- Nationality: Swedish
- Born: 26 February 1947 (age 79) Ragunda, Sweden

Sport
- Sport: Luge

Jan Nilsson (born 26 February 1947) is a Swedish luger. He competed in the men's singles and doubles events at the 1968 Winter Olympics.
