= Sergio Roura =

Spanish swimmer

Personal information
- Born: September 7, 1972 (age 53)

Sport
- Sport: Swimming

Sergio Roura (born 7 September 1972) is a Spanish freestyle swimmer who competed in the 1992 Summer Olympics.
