= Zbigniew Gawior =

Polish luger (1946–2003)

Medal record

Luge

European Championships
Bronze medal – third place	1967 Königssee	Men's doubles

Zbiginew Gawior (December 15, 1946 – May 20, 2003) was a Polish luger who competed in the late 1960s. He won a bronze medal in the men's doubles event at the 1967 FIL European Luge Championships in Königssee, West Germany.

Gawior also finished sixth in the men's doubles event at the 1968 Winter Olympics in Grenoble.
