= Ylva Hedlund =

Swedish speed skater

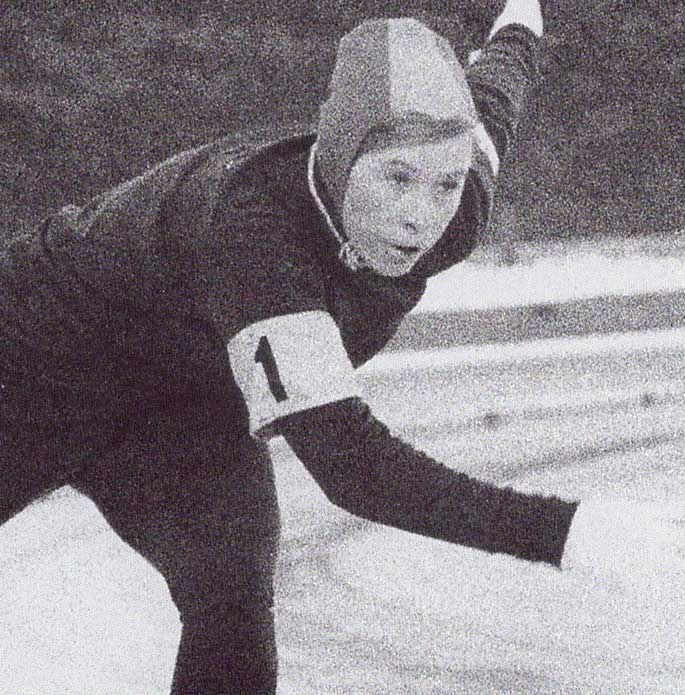

Personal information
- Nationality: Swedish
- Born: 22 November 1949 (age 75); Lidingö, Sweden

Sport
- Sport: Speed skating
- Club: IFK Lidingö

Ylva Hedlund (later Langermo; born 22 November 1949) is a Swedish speed skater. She competed at the 1968 and the 1972 Winter Olympics with the best result of 14th place over 1000 m in 1972.

Her father Göthe Hedlund was an Olympic medalist in speed skating.
