= Bruno Åvik =

Swedish cross-country skier

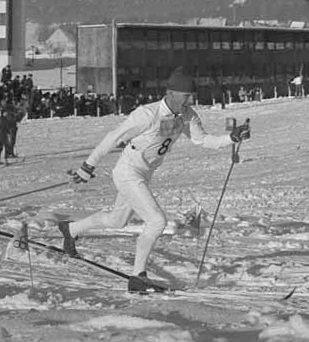
- Åvik at the 1968 Olympics

Personal information
- Born: 14 November 1940 (age 85) Kokkola, Finland
- Height: 173 cm (5 ft 8 in)
- Weight: 69 kg (152 lb)

Sport
- Sport: Cross-country skiing
- Club: Sälens IF, Transtrand

Bruno Valdemar Åvik (born 14 November 1940) is a retired Swedish cross-country skier. He competed in the 30 km event at the 1968 Winter Olympics and finished in 20th place. Åvik was born in Finland, but in 1959 moved to Sweden and became a Swedish citizen in 1966.

== Cross-country skiing results ==
=== Olympic Games ===
Year	Age	15 km	30 km	50 km	4 × 10 km relay
1968	27	—	20	—	—
