= Åvik =

Village in Lindesnes Municipality, Norway

- Village
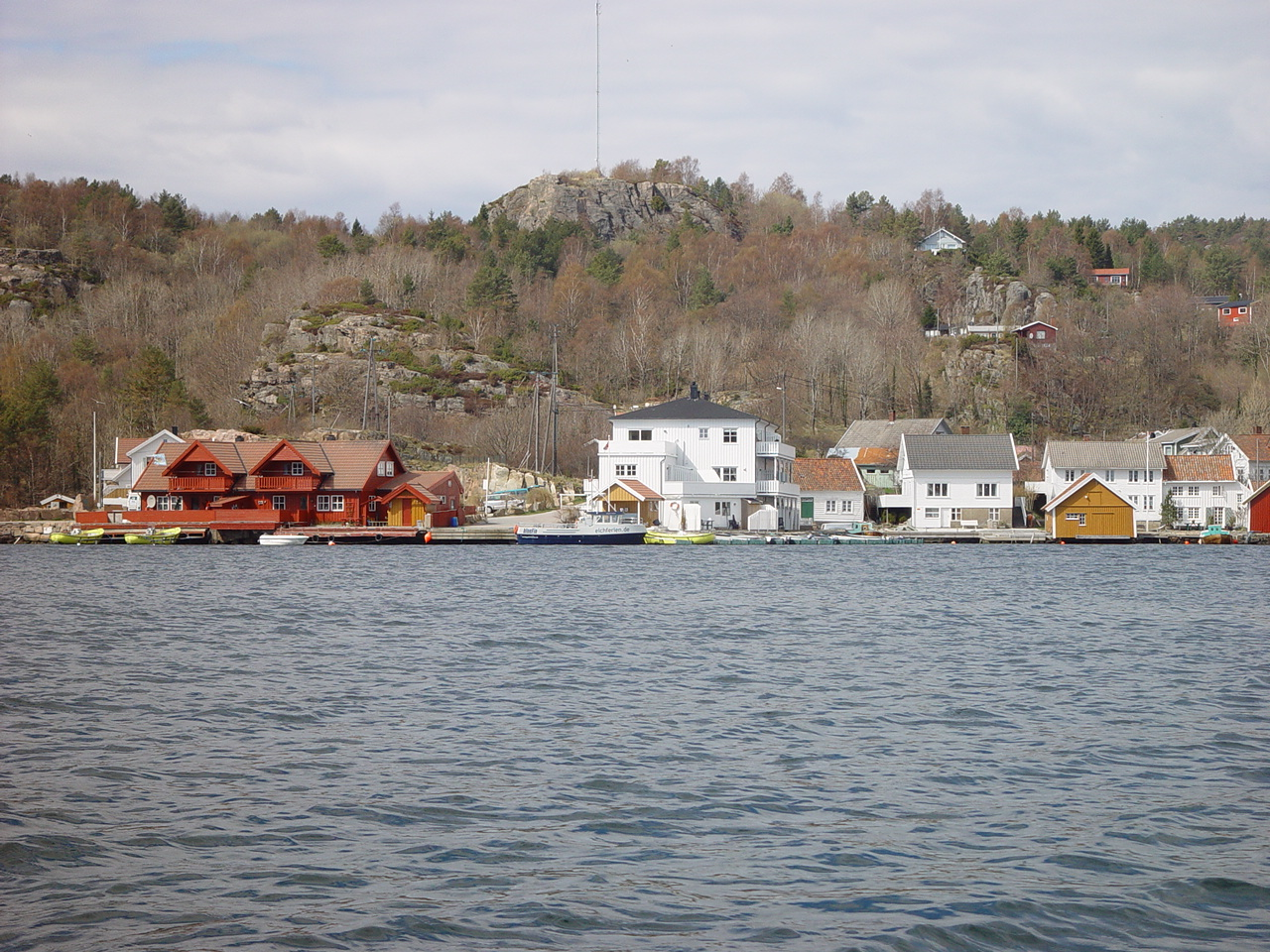
- View of the village harbour
- Interactive map of Åvik
- Coordinates: 58.03277°N 7.22122°E
- Country: Norway
- Region: Southern Norway
- County: Agder
- Municipality: Lindesnes Municipality
- Elevation: 1 m (3.3 ft)
- Time zone: UTC+01:00 (CET)
  - Summer (DST): UTC+02:00 (CEST)
- Post Code: 4520 Lindesnes

Åvik is a small seaport village in Lindesnes Municipality in Agder county, Norway. The village is on the coast near the southernmost part of Norway, about two kilometres (1.2 mi) to the southeast of the village of Svennevik. Åvik sits on the mainland, about 300 metres (980 ft) north of the island of Svinør, and together, the harbours of Åvik and Svinør form one large harbour area. There are many old wooden houses in Åvik.

== Media gallery ==
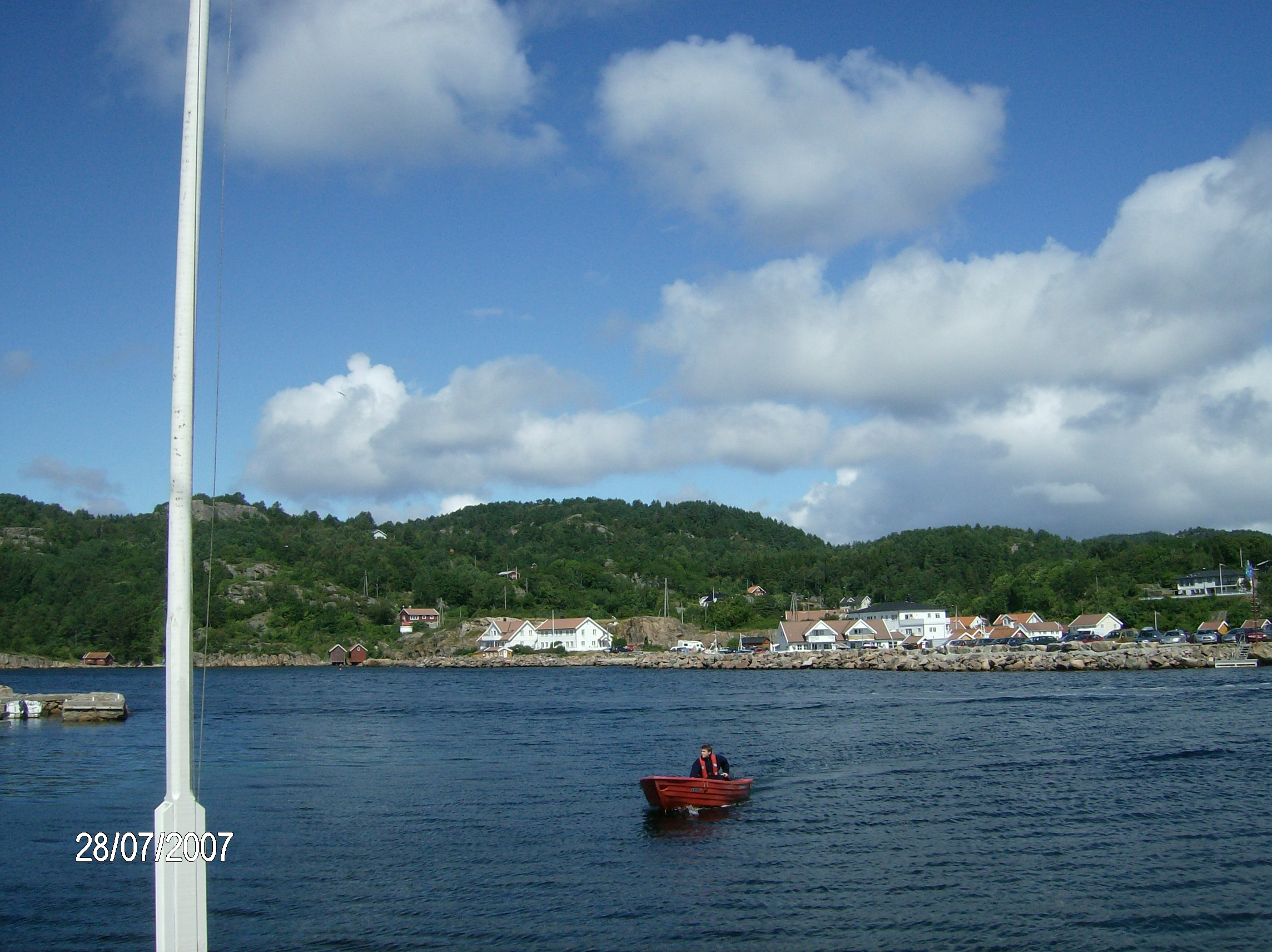
Åvik from Svinør

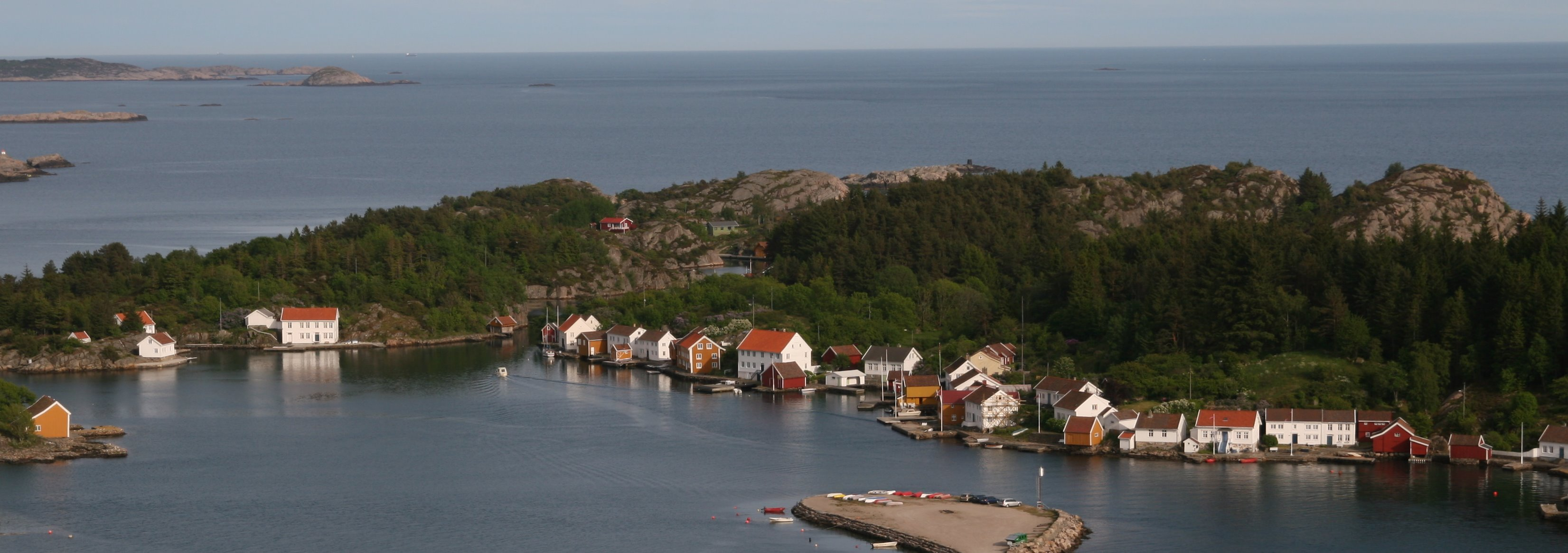
Svinør from Åvik. The small round pier in the foreground is connected to Åvik.

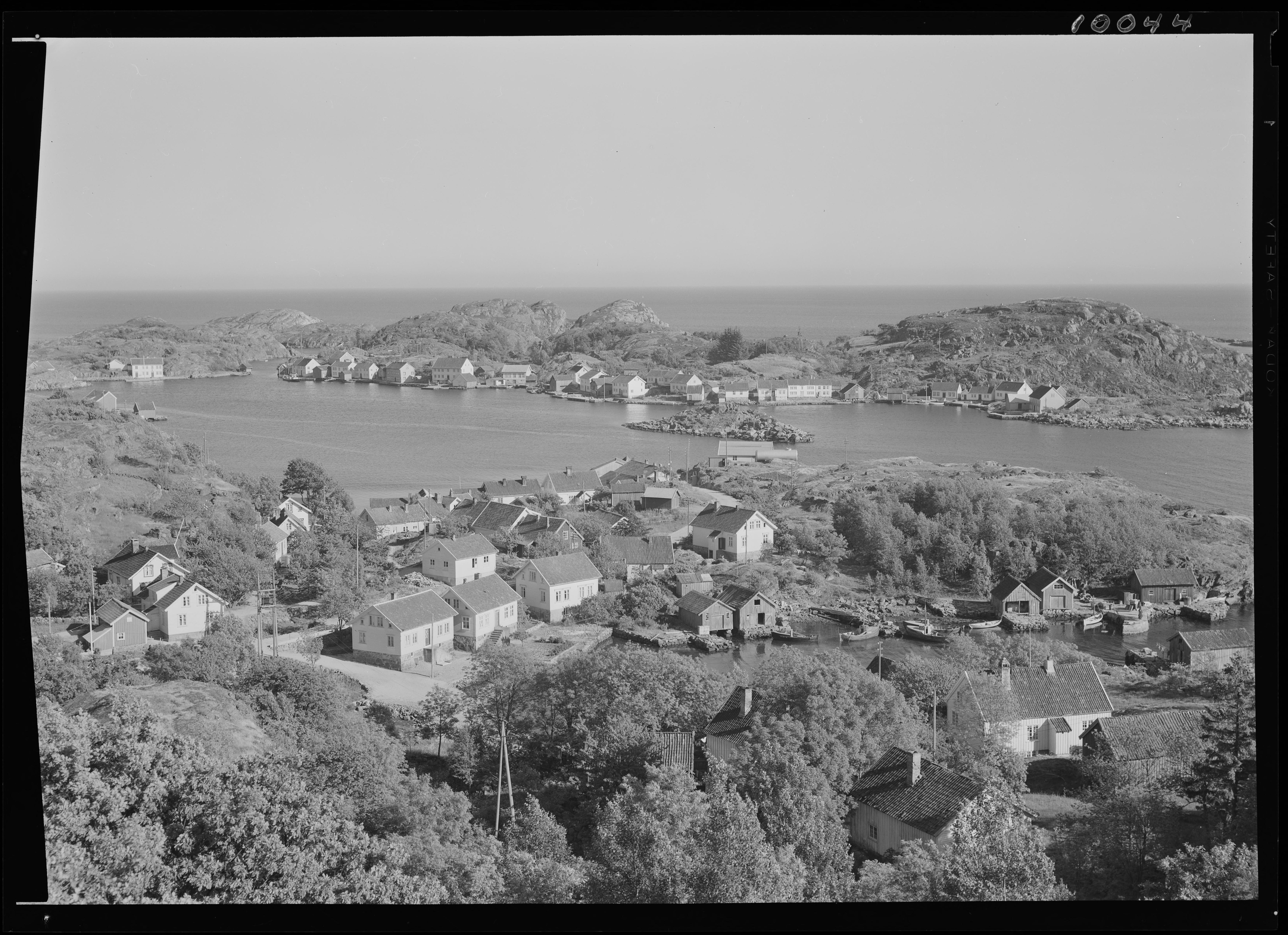
Åvik (foreground) and Svinør (distance) from the 1950s
