= Luge =

Sliding sport and type of sled

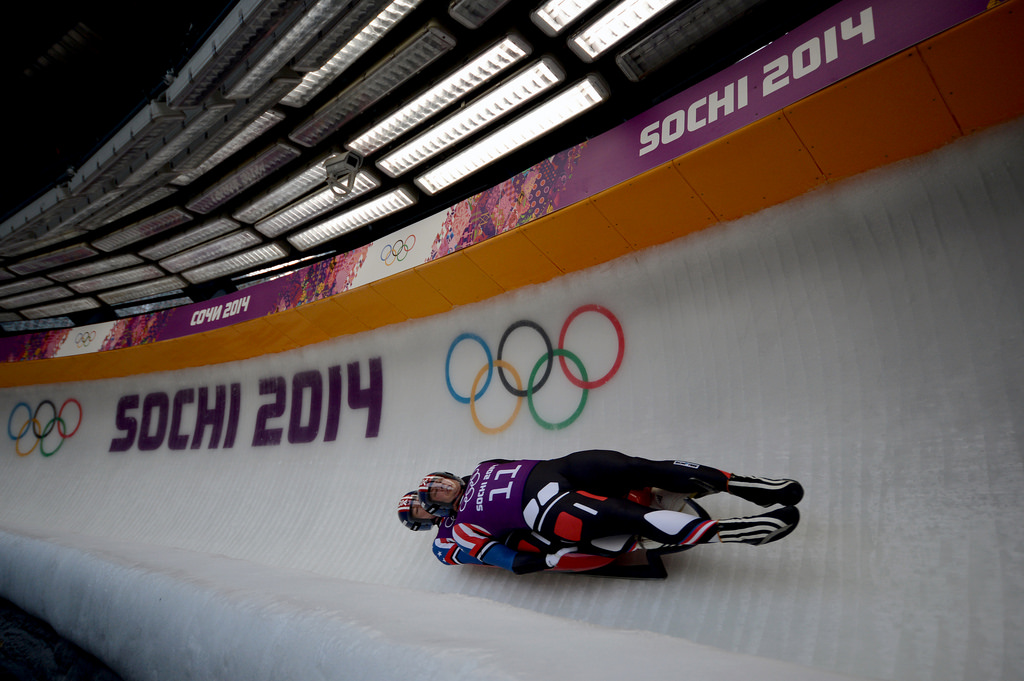
- American lugers at the 2014 Winter Olympics
- Highest governing body: Fédération Internationale de Luge
- First played: 1870s

Characteristics
- Contact: No
- Team members: Teams of one or two
- Mixed-sex: Yes, but usually in separate competitions
- Type: Winter sport, Time trial
- Equipment: Sled, helmet, suit, visor, gloves, finger spikes, booties
- Venue: Luge tracks

Presence
- Olympic: Part of Winter Olympic program since 1964

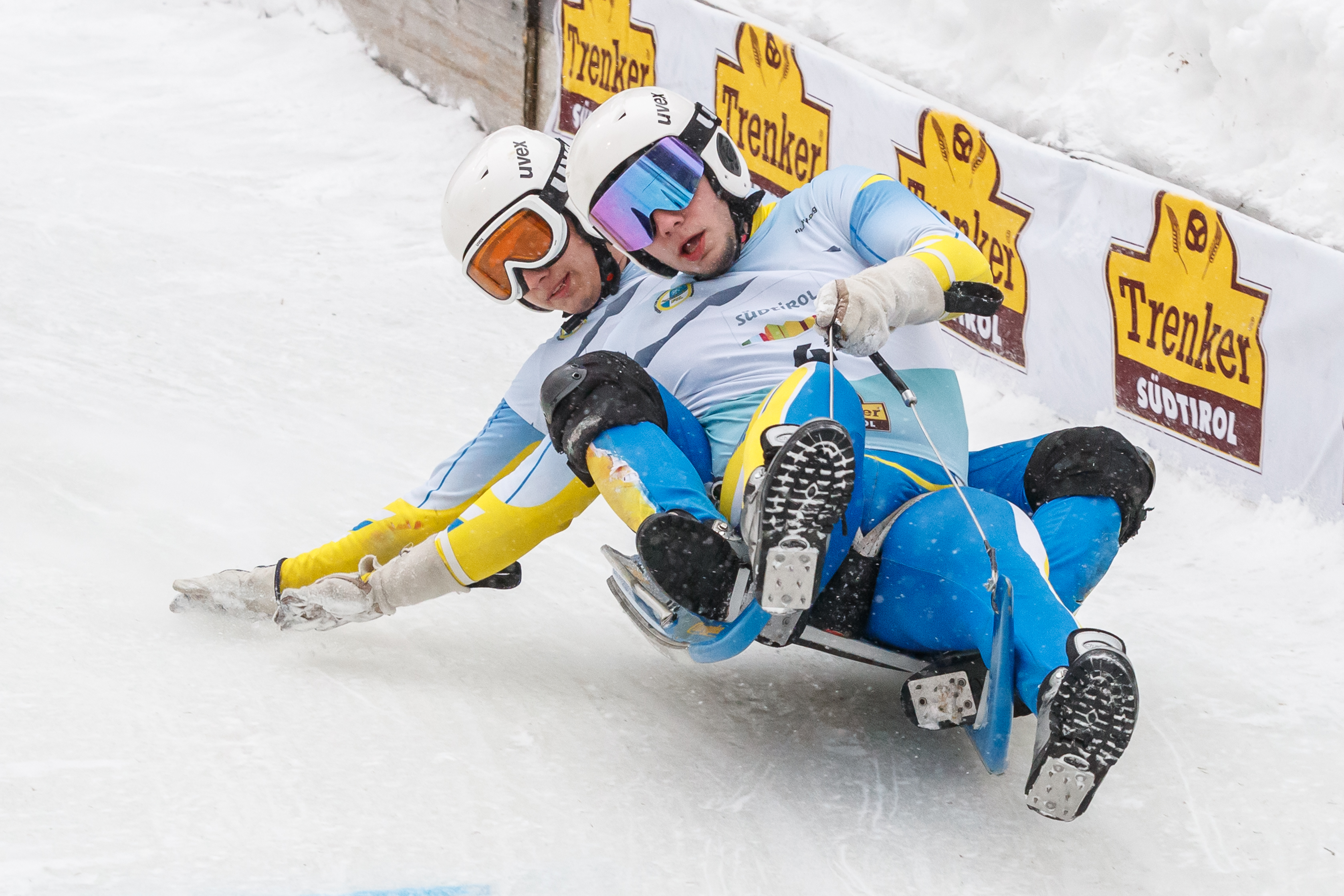
Doubles luge, Myroslav and Ivan Lenko at the 2022 Luge World Cup trainings

A luge (/luːʒ/) is a small one- or two-person sled on which one sleds supine (face up) and feet first. A luger begins seated, propelling themselves initially from handles on either side of the start ramp, then steers by using the calf muscles to flex the sled's runners or by exerting opposite shoulder pressure to the pod. Racing sleds weigh 21–25 kg (46–55 lb) for singles and 25–30 kg (55–66 lb) for doubles. Luge is also the name of an Olympic sport that employs that sled and technique.

It is not to be confused with skeleton bob, which is also a single person tray-like sled in the bobsleigh family, and the name of the sport that uses that sled, but which is designed for a running start, steering by shoulders and feet, and to be laid on face-down and head-first. While skeleton and bobsleigh are part of one international federation and sport, luge is organised separately by the International Luge Federation (FIL).

Lugers can reach speeds of over 140 km/h (87 mph; 39 m/s), and is the fastest of the three 'sliding' sports. Austrian luger Manuel Pfister reached a top speed of 154 km/h (96 mph; 43 m/s) on a track in Whistler, Canada, prior to the 2010 Winter Olympics. Lugers compete against a timer in one of the most precisely timed sports in the world—to one millisecond on artificial tracks.

The first recorded use of the term "luge" dates to 1905 and derives from the Savoy/Swiss dialect use of the French word luge, meaning "small coasting sled".

== History ==
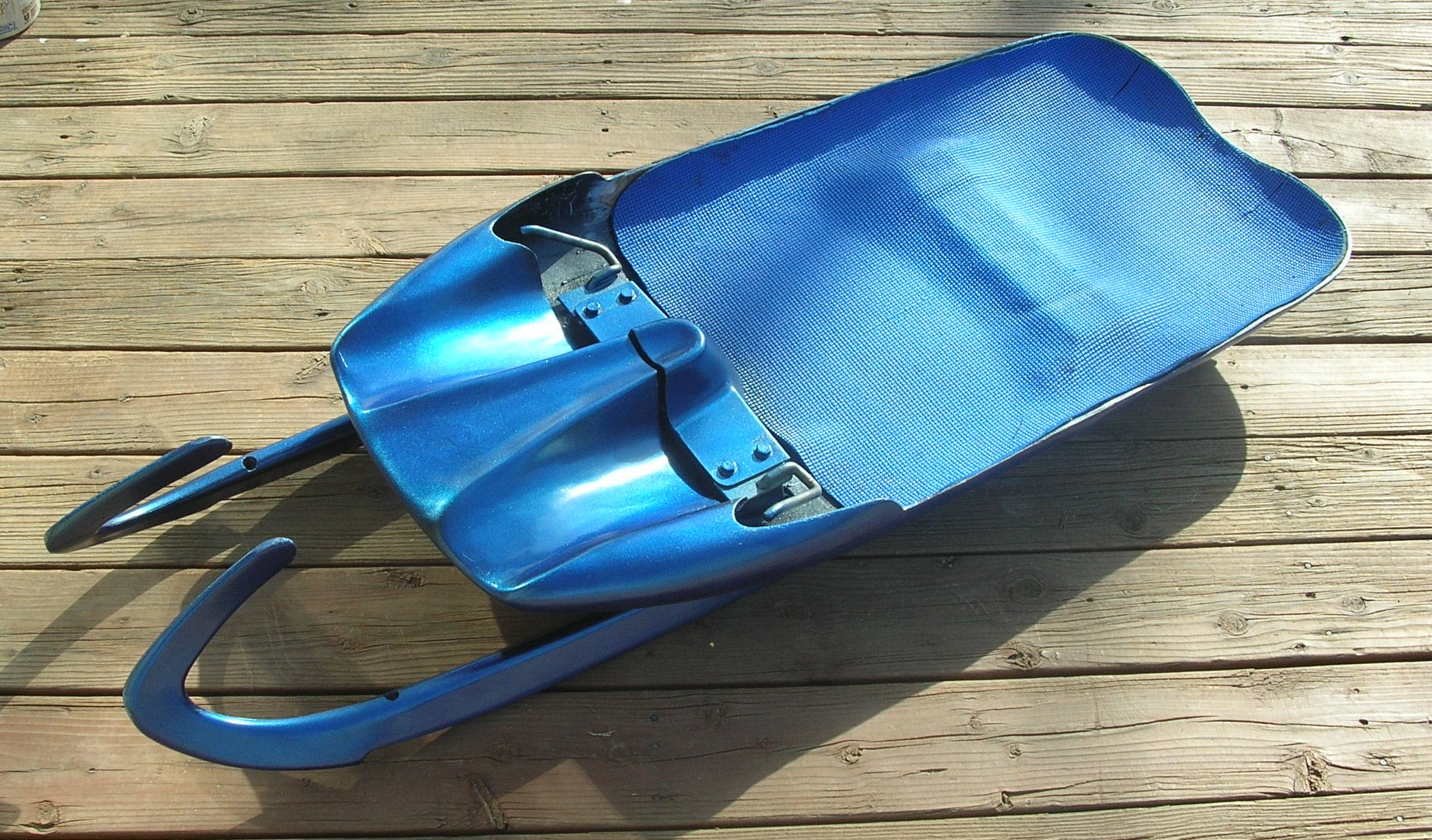
Luge sled, with steel runners removed

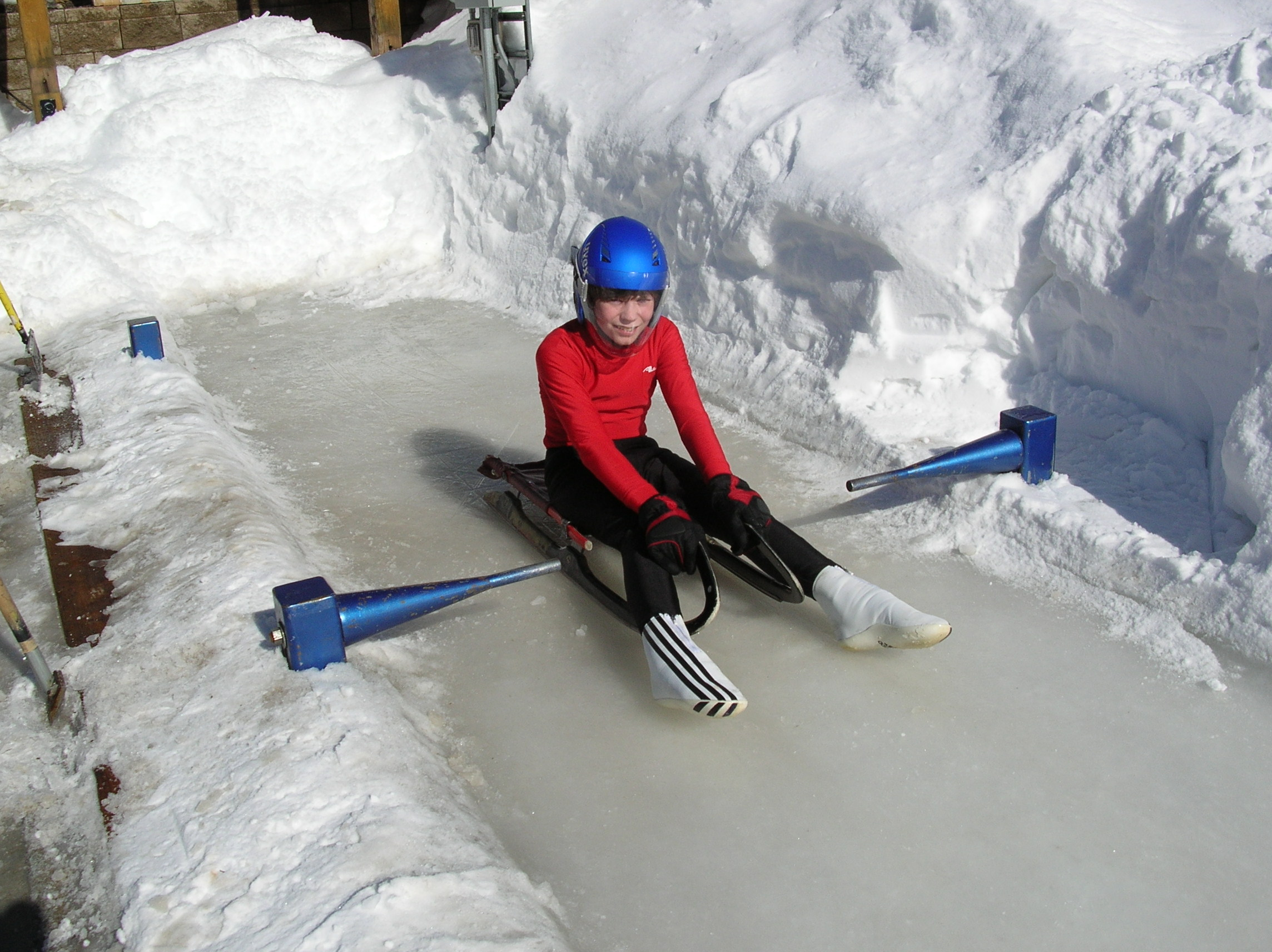
A young luger on the start ramp at the Utah Olympic track

The practical use of sleds is ancient and widespread. The first recorded sled races took place in Norway sometime during the 15th century.

The sport of luge, like the skeleton and the bobsleigh, originated in Davos and the health-spa town of St Moritz, Switzerland, in the mid-to-late 19th century, through the endeavours of hotel entrepreneur Caspar Badrutt. Badrutt successfully sold the idea of winter resorting, as well as rooms with food, drink, and activities. His more adventurous English guests began adapting delivery boys' sleds for recreation, which led to collisions with pedestrians as they sped down the lanes and alleys of the village.

The first organized meeting of the sport took place in 1883 in Switzerland. In 1913, the International Sled Sports Federation (German: Internationaler Schlittensportverband) was founded in Dresden, Germany. This body governed the sport until 1935, when it was incorporated in the International Bobsleigh and Tobogganing Federation (French: Fédération Internationale de Bobsleigh et de Tobogganing, FIBT). After it had been decided that luge would replace the sport of skeleton at the Olympic Games, the first World Championships in the sport were held in 1955 in Oslo (Norway). In 1957, the International Luge Federation (French: Fédération Internationale de Luge de Course, FIL) was founded. Luge events were first included in the Winter Olympic Games in 1964.

Americans were slow to adopt the sport of luge. The first luge run in North America was built at Lolo Hot Springs, Montana, in 1965. Although the United States competed in every Olympic luge event from 1964 to 1976, it was not until 1979 that the United States Luge Association was founded. The first artificial American track was completed in that year for use in the 1980 XIII Winter Olympic Games at Lake Placid, New York. Since that time the United States luge program has greatly improved. A second artificial track was constructed near Park City, Utah, for the 2002 XIX Olympic Winter Games at Salt Lake City.

Caitlin Nash and Natalie Corless, both of Canada, became the first all-female team to compete in a Senior World Cup doubles race in luge in 2019.

== Artificial tracks ==
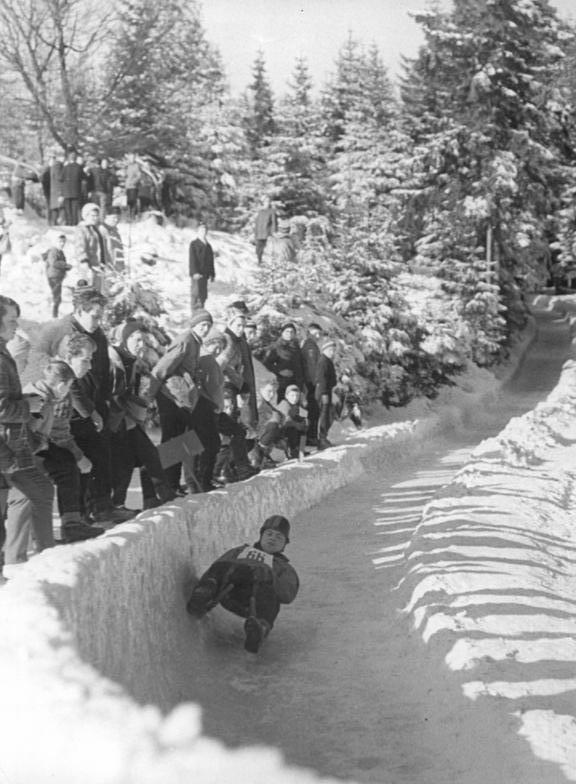
German luger Thomas Köhler in 1964

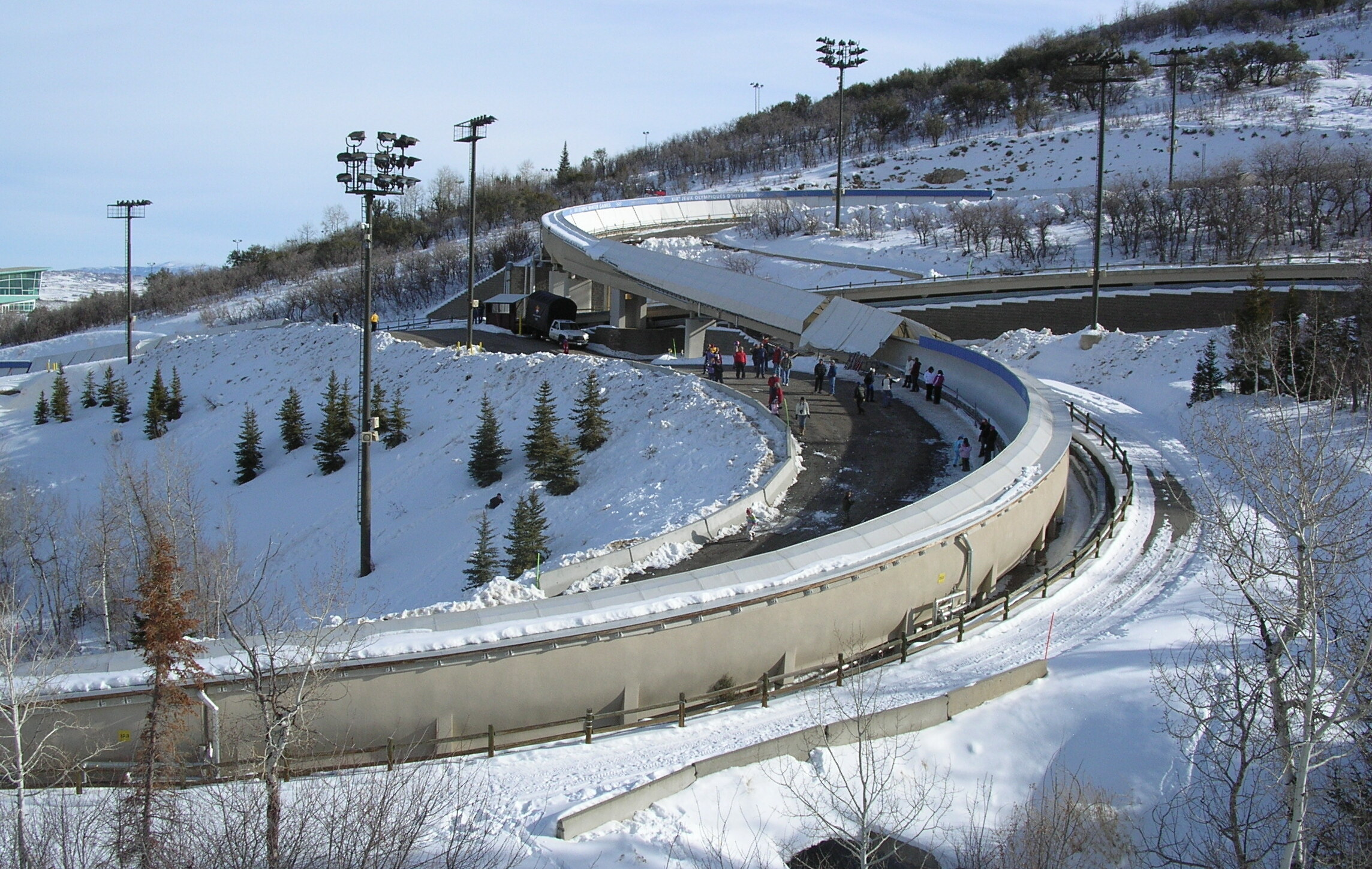
Curves 11 and 12 on the Utah Olympic track near Park City, Utah

Artificial luge tracks have specially designed and constructed banked curves plus walled-in straights. Most tracks are artificially refrigerated, but artificial tracks without artificial cooling also exist (for example, in St. Moritz). Tracks tend to be very smooth.

The athletes ride in a flat, aerodynamic position on the sled, keeping their heads low to minimize air resistance. They steer the sled mainly with their calves by applying pressure on the runners—right calf to turn left, left calf to turn right. It takes a precise mix of shifting body weight, applying pressure with calves and rolling the shoulders. There are also handles for minor adjustments. A successful luger maintains complete concentration and relaxation on the sled while travelling at high speeds. Fastest times result from following the perfect "line" down the track. Any slight error, such as brushing against the wall, costs time. Track conditions are also important. Softer ice tends to have more grip which leads to slower times, while harder ice tends to have less grip which leads to faster times. Lugers race at speeds averaging 120–145 km/h (75–90 mph) around high banked curves while experiencing a centripetal acceleration of up to 5g. Men's Singles have their start locations near where the bobsled and skeleton competitors start at most tracks, while both the Doubles and Women's Singles competition have their starthouse located farther down the track. Artificial track luge is the fastest and most agile sledding sport.

== Natural track luge ==
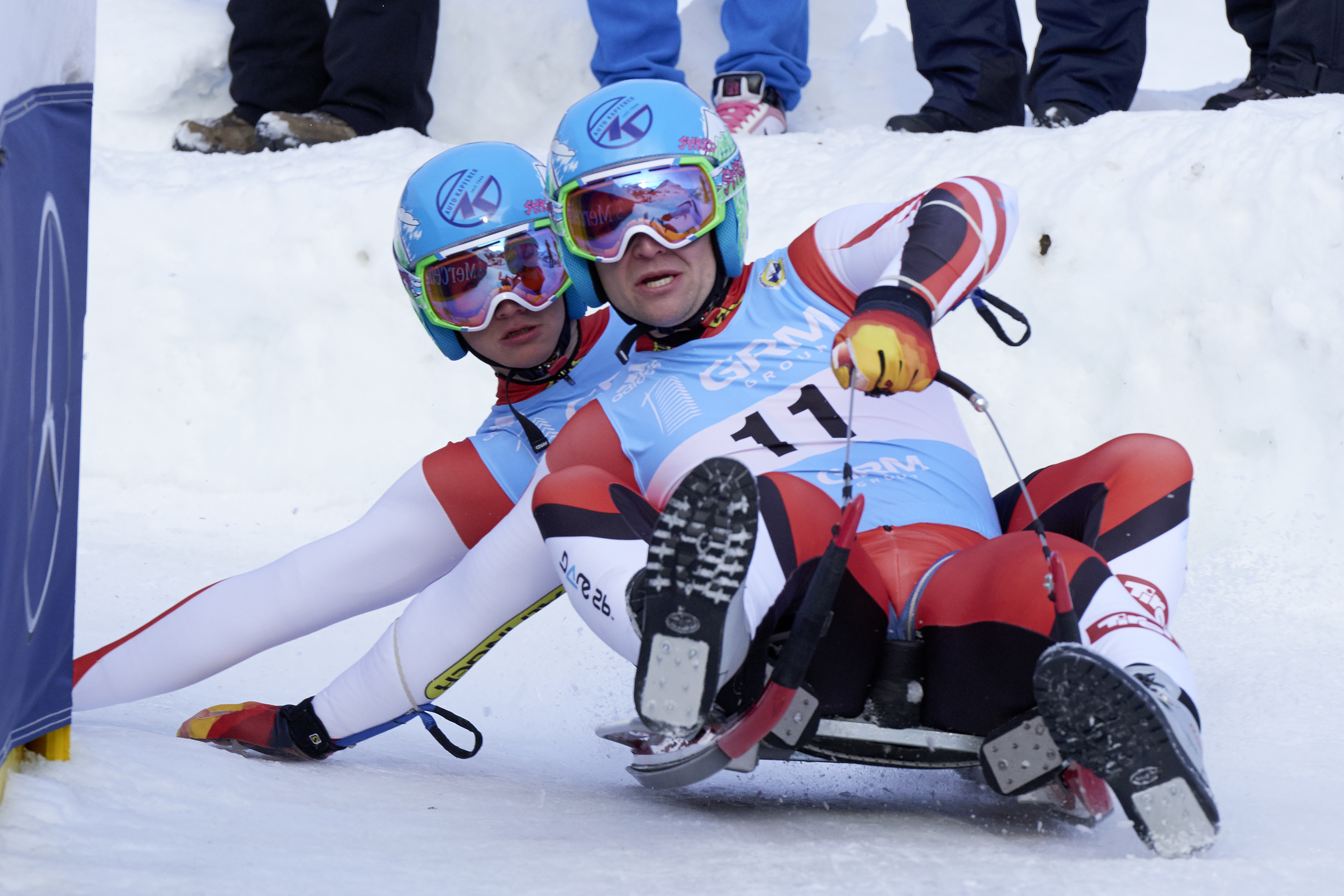
Natural lugers on double sled

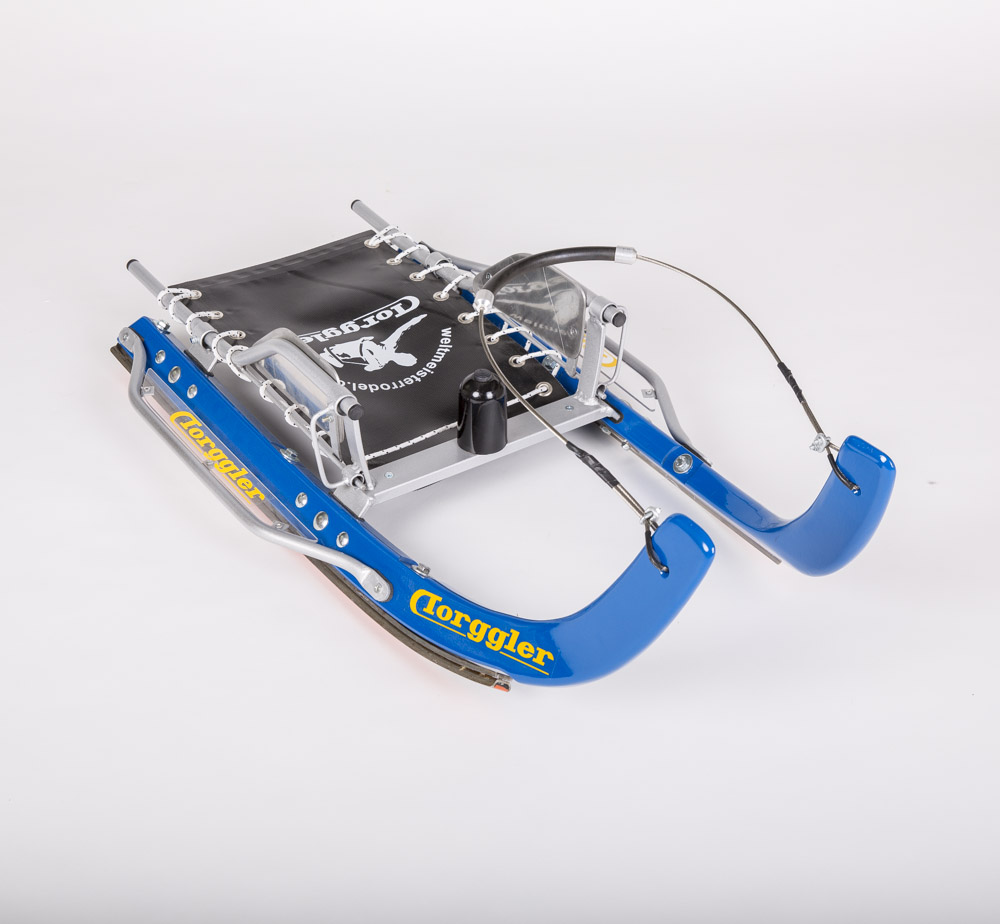
Luge "natural track racing sled" with steering rope and runners

Natural tracks are adapted from existing mountain roads and paths. Artificially banked curves are not permitted. The track's surface should be horizontal. They are naturally iced. Tracks can get rough from the braking and steering action. Athletes use a steering rein, put out their hands and use their legs to steer around the tight corners. Braking is often required in front of curves and is accomplished by the use of spikes built on the bottom of the shoes. Tracks have a slope of not more than 15%.

Most of the tracks are situated in Austria and Italy, with others in Germany, Poland, Russia, Slovenia, Switzerland, Croatia, Liechtenstein, France, Turkey, Sweden, Norway, Romania, Slovakia, New Zealand, Canada and the United States.

The Upper Peninsula Luge Club in Negaunee, Michigan, is the only natural luge track iced for competition in the United States. The ~700 meter (half-mile) track has a 88-meter (289 ft) vertical drop and a portion is open to winter public sliding.

Canada has tracks in Camrose, Hinton, Grande Prairie, Calgary, and Calabogie. The track in Naseby, New Zealand, is the only one in the Southern Hemisphere. The track is 360 metres long, and is open to the public through winter.

World championships have been held since 1979 while European championships have been held since 1970. In season 2015/16 FIL started with the Junior Worldcup.

== Events ==
There are five luge disciplines.

- Men's singles
- Men's doubles
- Women's singles
- Women's doubles
- Team relay

These are further broken into several age classes: multiple youth and junior classes that cover the age range 7–20, and general class (age 21+). Older competitors may enjoy the sport in masters (age 30–50) and senior masters (age 51+) classes. In a team relay competition, one man, one woman, and a doubles pair form a team. A touchpad at the bottom of the run is touched by a competitor signaling a teammate at the top of the run to start.

Rules and procedures for races are very precise:

- A drawing is held to determine start order for the race. Athletes are assigned a number which is displayed on a bib. For most races, all categories race 2 runs. During the Olympic Games the men's and women's singles races are held over 4 runs. Conversely, men's doubles is 2 runs. The cumulative time of all runs is used to determine finish order. In all three events, the start order after the first run is determined by the outcome of the previous run, with the last-place slider sliding first, the next-to-last place slider sliding second, and so forth, with the leader of the previous run sliding last.
- Physical measurements of the sled are taken, and the temperature of the sled's steel blades is checked and may not be more than 5 °C (9 °F) above that of a previously established control temperature. Additionally, for artificial track races, the athlete must first be weighed. This is to determine whether the athlete is entitled to carry extra weight on their body while sliding. Men may use additional weight amounting to 75% of the difference between body weight and a base weight of 90 kg (200 lb). Women may use additional weight amounting to 50% of the difference between body weight and a base weight of 70 kg (150 lb). Doubles athletes may use additional weight amounting to 50% of the difference between body weight and a base weight of 90 kg (200 lb). Additional weight is not allowed if the body weight of the front person and back person together exceeds 180 kg (400 lb). If one of the partners weighs more than 90 kg, the weight exceeding the 90 kg mark is added to the lighter partner. If there should still be a difference between the partner's weight and the 90 kg mark, the difference can be compensated according to an official weight table. Between runs, athletes are randomly selected for additional weight checks. Before each run, the sled (with the athlete, for artificial track races) is weighed at the start ramp.
- Once an athlete is on their sled, they are audibly notified that the track is clear. At this point, a tone sounds and the athlete has thirty seconds to begin their run. A run becomes official when an athlete and their sled, in contact with each other, crosses the finish line. If an athlete and sled are not within contact of each other, the athlete is disqualified from further competition. Disqualifications may also take place for any violation of rules and regulations. Certain disqualifications may be appealed.

== Training ==
The sport of luge requires an athlete to balance mental and physical fitness. Physically, a luger must have strong muscles in the neck, upper body, abdomen and thigh. Athletes also use wind tunnels to train. Strength training is essential to withstand the extreme G-forces of tight turns at high speeds. Since lugers have very little protection other than a visor and helmet, they must be able to endure the physical pounding administered by the track when mistakes are made.

== Risks ==
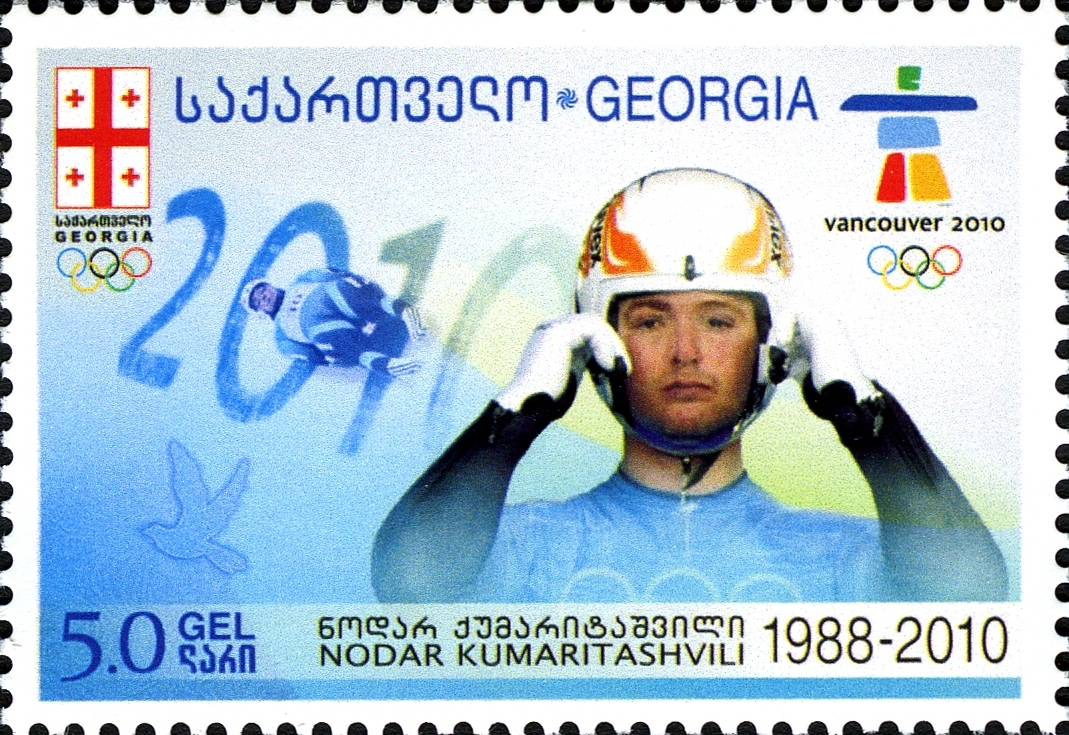
Georgian stamp of Nodar Kumaritashvili

As with many extreme sports, luging has risks. Though most injuries involve bumps, bruises, broken bones and concussions, fatalities do occasionally occur. Georgian luger Nodar Kumaritashvili suffered a fatal crash during his final practice run for the 2010 Winter Olympics on the Whistler Sliding Centre in Whistler, British Columbia, Canada. Hours later, the International Luge Federation concluded that the accident was caused by a steering error and not a track error; nevertheless, changes to the track were made before the re-opening. The coroner's report differed somewhat, saying that the accident was brought on by several factors including the high speed of the track and its technical difficulty. He wrote "Mr. Kumaritashvili was [probably] sliding faster than ever before in his life, and was attempting to go even faster, while simultaneously struggling to learn the intricacies of the track and the dynamics it created." Kumaritashvili was the fourth athlete to die while in preparation for a Winter Olympics competition, following speed skier Nicolas Bochatay, aged 27, who died while preparing for the Albertville 1992 games; and British luger Kazimierz Kay-Skrzypecki and skier Ross Milne, aged 19, who both died in the run-up to the Innsbruck 1964 games.

== Governing body ==
The sport of luge is governed by the Fédération International de Luge de Course (FIL, International Luge Federation). The FIL is based in Salzburg, Austria, and includes 53 member nations. It has traditionally had a dominant number of German-speaking representatives.

The following persons have been president of the FIL:

- Bert Isatitsch, Austria (1957–1994)
- Josef Fendt, Germany (1994–2020)
- Einars Fogelis, Latvia (2020–present)

== Olympic medal table ==
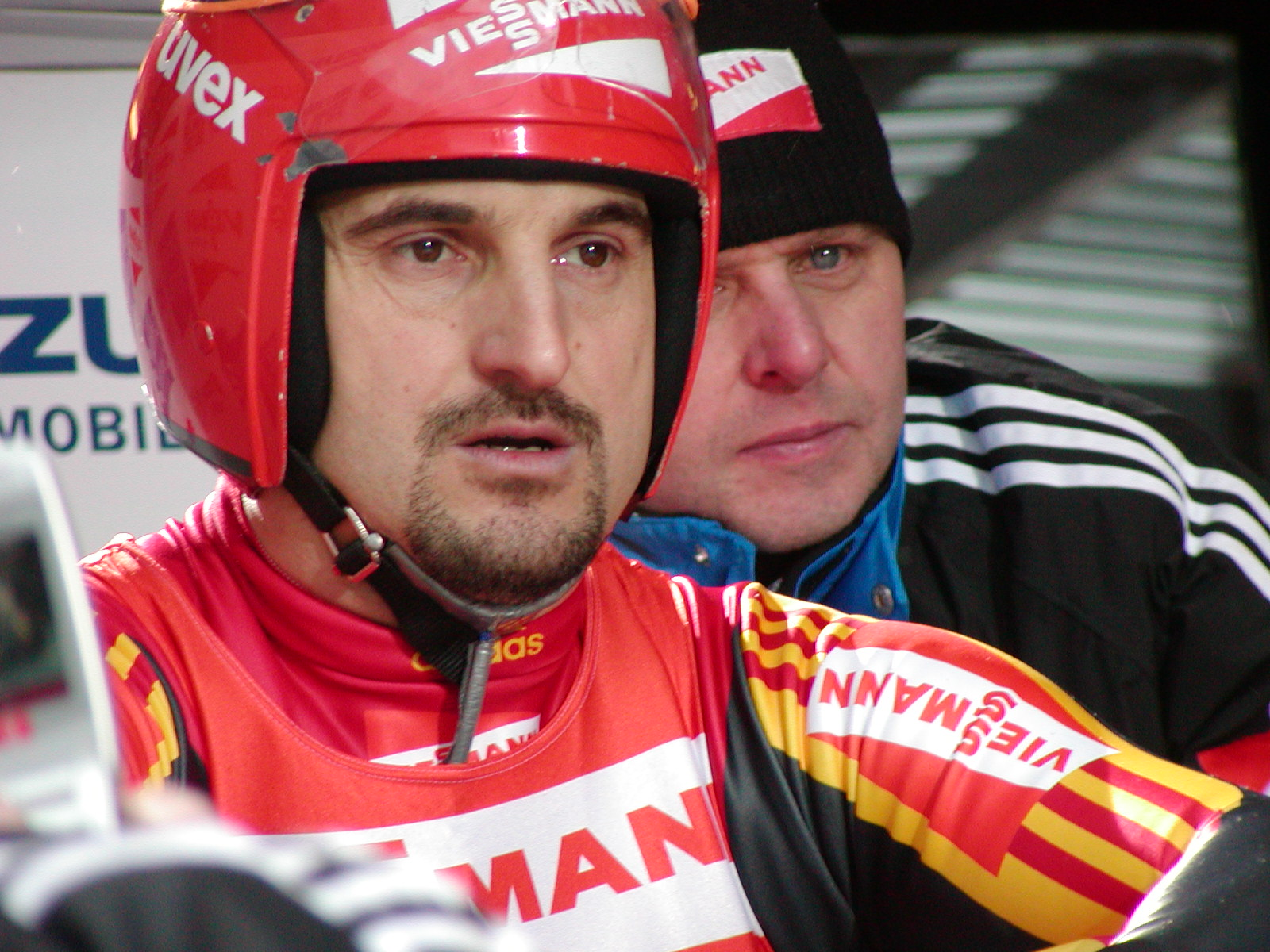
Georg Hackl of Germany, Olympic champion with five medals attained in consecutive Olympics, of which three are gold medals.

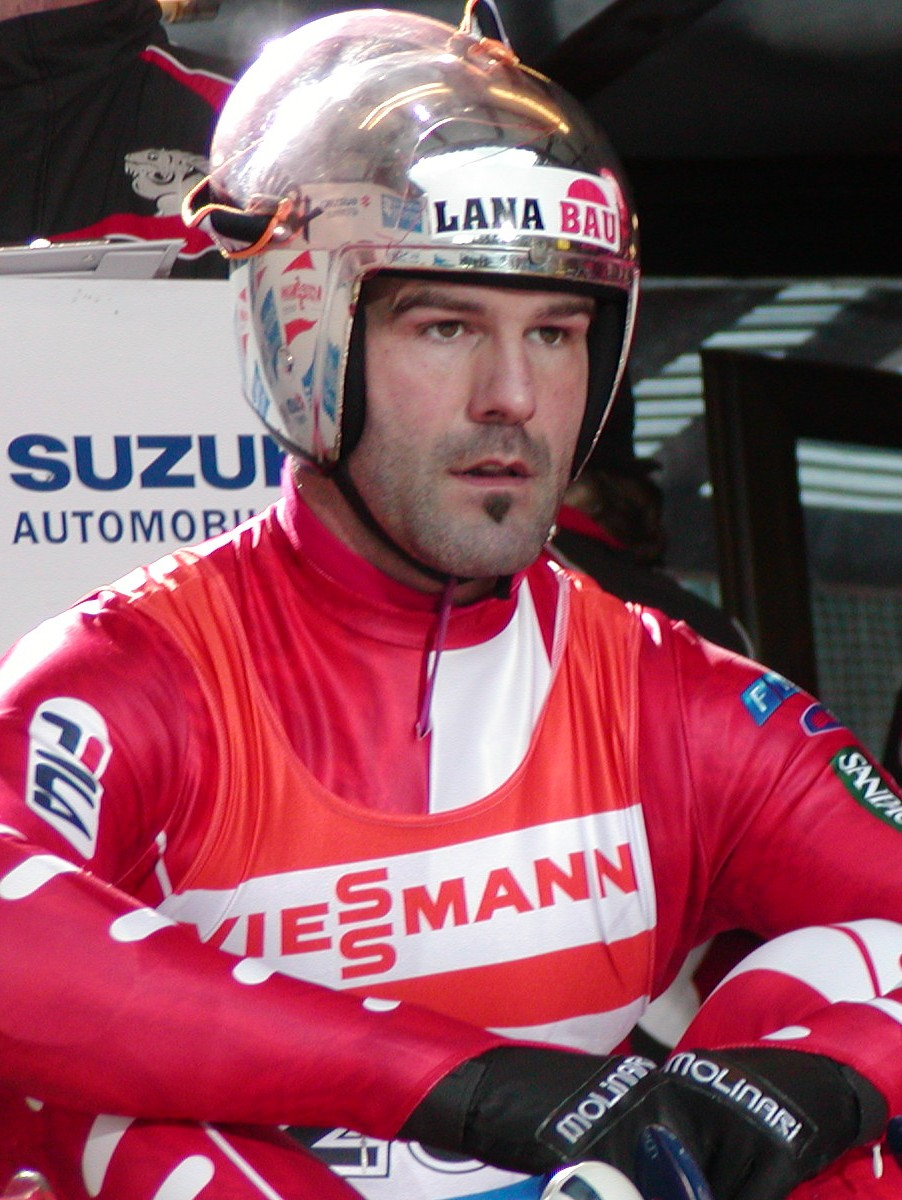
Armin Zöggeler is an Italian luger, and is the first athlete to have won a medal in six consecutive Olympics in the same individual event (men's singles luge between 1994-2014).

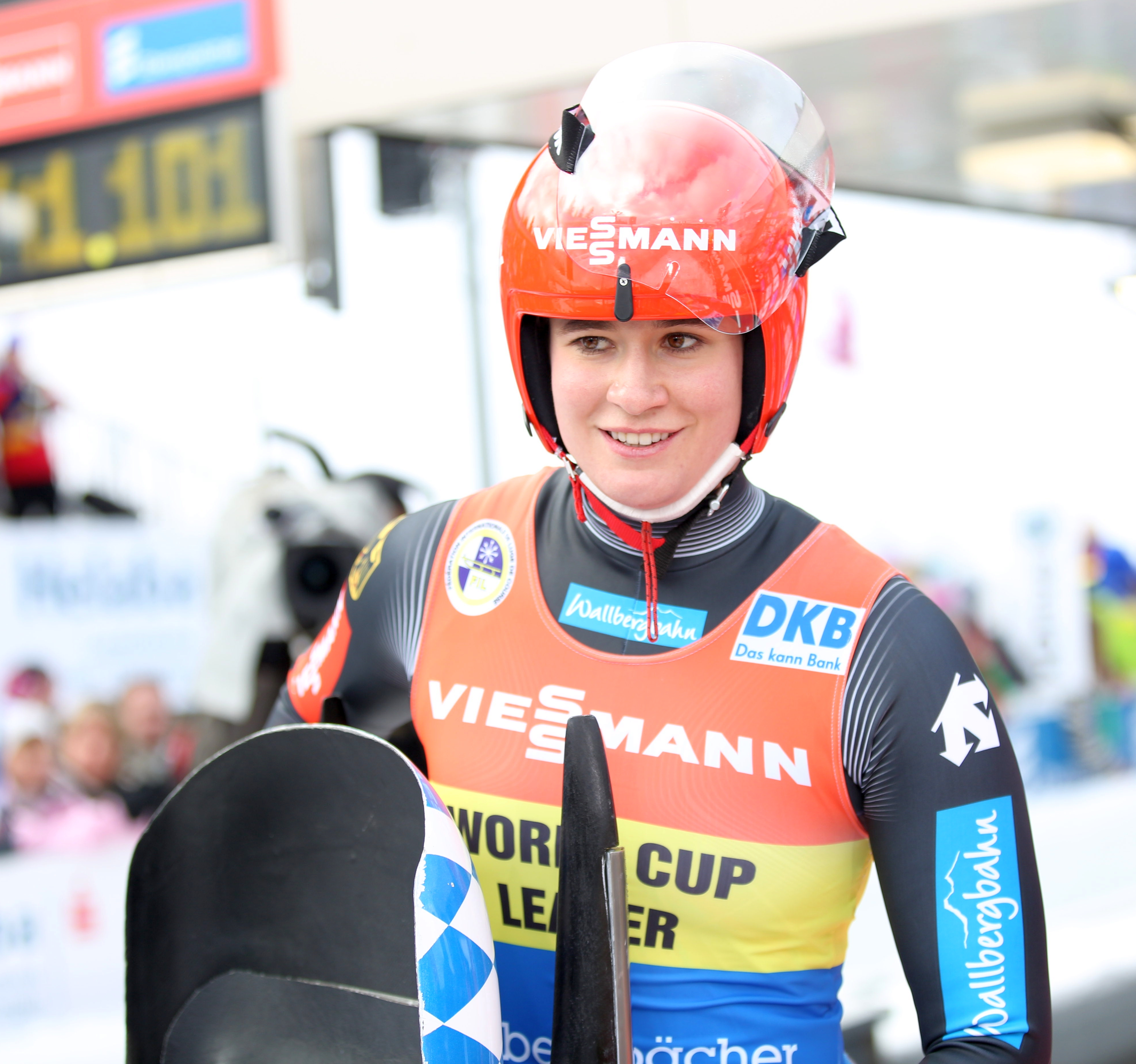
Natalie Geisenberger of Germany, Olympic champion with seven medals attained in consecutive Olympics, of which six are gold medals.

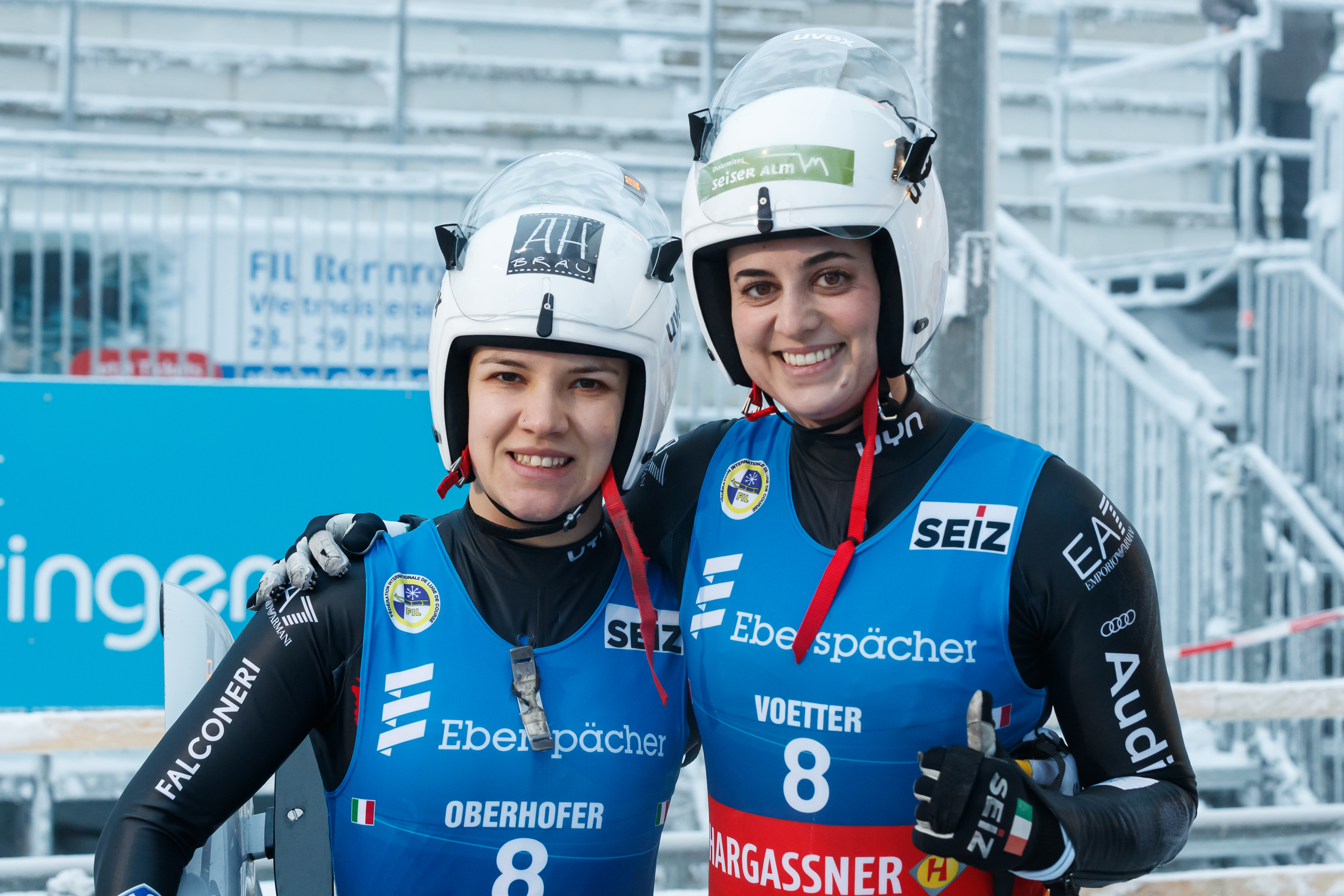
Andrea Vötter and Marion Oberhofer, 2026 Olympic gold (women's doubles) and bronze (team relay) medalists, the first ever champions in the women's doubles event at the Olympics.

=== Men's singles ===
Up to: 2026

Rank	Nation	Gold	Silver	Bronze	Total
1	Germany^{[a]}	12	7	7	26
2	Italy	3	2	5	10
3	Austria	2	4	2	8
4	Russia^{[b]}	0	3	2	5
5	United States	0	1	0	1
6	Latvia	0	0	1	1
Totals (6 entries)		17	17	17	51

=== Doubles ===
Up to: 2026

Rank	Nation	Gold	Silver	Bronze	Total
1	Germany^{[a]}	12	5	8	25
2	Austria	3	5	3	11
3	Italy	3	2	3	8
4	United States	0	2	2	4
5	Latvia	0	1	1	2
6	Russia^{[b]}	0	1	0	1
Totals (6 entries)		18	16	17	51

=== Women's singles ===
Up to: 2026

Rank	Nation	Gold	Silver	Bronze	Total
1	Germany^{[a]}	13	14	9	36
2	Italy	2	0	0	2
3	Austria	1	2	3	6
4	Russia^{[b]}	1	0	2	3
5	Latvia	0	1	0	1
6	United States	0	0	2	2
7	Canada	0	0	1	1
Totals (7 entries)		17	17	17	51

=== Women's doubles ===
Up to: 2026

Rank	Nation	Gold	Silver	Bronze	Total
1	Italy	1	0	0	1
2	Germany	0	1	0	1
3	Austria	0	0	1	1
Totals (3 entries)		1	1	1	3

=== Team relay ===
Up to: 2026

Rank	Nation	Gold	Silver	Bronze	Total
1	Germany	4	0	0	4
2	Austria	0	2	1	3
3	Canada	0	1	0	1
3	Russia	0	1	0	1
5	Latvia	0	0	2	2
6	Italy	0	0	1	1
Totals (6 entries)		4	4	4	12

=== Total Olympic Medals ===
Up to: 2026

Rank	Nation	Gold	Silver	Bronze	Total
1	Germany^{[a]}	41	27	24	92
2	Italy	9	4	9	22
3	Austria	6	13	10	29
4	Russia^{[b]}	1	5	4	10
5	United States	0	3	4	7
6	Latvia	0	2	4	6
7	Canada	0	1	1	2
Totals (7 entries)		57	55	56	168

- ^[a] Including East Germany and West Germany
- ^[b] Including Soviet Union and Russian Olympic Committee

== Fatal accidents ==
Competitor	Year	Track	Race	Event
(United Kingdom) Kazimierz Kay-Skrzypeski	1964	(Austria) Innsbruck	Training run	1964 Winter Olympics
(Poland) Stanisław Paczka	1969	(Germany) Königssee	First run	FIL World Luge Championships 1969
(Georgia (country)) Nodar Kumaritashvili	2010	(Canada) Whistler	Training run	2010 Winter Olympics

== See also ==
- World Luge Championships
- World Luge Natural Track Championships
- List of Luge World Cup champions
- European Luge Championships
- European Luge Natural Track Championships
- Bobsleigh
- Skeleton
- Toboggan
- Street luge
