= Bobsleigh at the 1964 Winter Olympics – Two-man =

Two-man at the IX Olympic Winter Games
- Venue: Bob und Rodelbahn Igls
- Dates: 31 January – 1 February 1964
- Competitors: 42 from 11 nations
- Winning time: 4:21.90

Medalists
1st place, gold medalist(s)		Anthony Nash; Robin Thomas Dixon	Great Britain
2nd place, silver medalist(s)		Sergio Zardini; Romano Bonagura	Italy
3rd place, bronze medalist(s)		Eugenio Monti; Sergio Siorpaes	Italy

Two-man bobsleigh at the 1964 Winter Olympics took place on 31 January and 1 February at Bob und Rodelbahn Igls, Innsbruck, Austria. This event was last run at the 1956 Winter Olympics as bobsleigh was not part of the 1960 games.

The winning athletes were those who posted the shortest total time over four separate runs. British duo Anthony Nash
Robin Thomas Dixon took gold, the first medal of any kind on this event for Great Britain. Taking silver and bronze were the two Italian crews.

== Results ==
Rank	Country	Athletes	Run 1	Run 2	Run 3	Run 4	Total	Behind
1st place, gold medalist(s)	Great Britain (GBR-1)	Anthony Nash; Robin Thomas Dixon	1:05.53	1:05.10	1:05.39	1:05.88	4:21.90	—
2nd place, silver medalist(s)	Italy (ITA-2)	Sergio Zardini; Romano Bonagura	1:05.63	1:05.13	1:05.21	1:06.05	4:22.02	+0.12
3rd place, bronze medalist(s)	Italy (ITA-1)	Eugenio Monti; Sergio Siorpaes	1:05.94	1:04.90	1:05.41	1:06.38	4:22.63	+0.73
4	Canada (CAN-2)	Vic Emery; Peter Kirby	1:05.15	1:05.93	1:05.96	1:06.45	4:23.49	+1.59
5	United States (USA-1)	Larry McKillip; Jim Lamy	1:06.17	1:06.34	1:05.84	1:06.25	4:24.60	+2.70
6	United Team of Germany (EUA-1)	Franz Wörmann; Hubert Braun	1:06.87	1:06.42	1:05.17	1:06.24	4:24.70	+2.80
7	United States (USA-2)	Charlie McDonald; Chuck Pandolph	1:05.97	1:05.85	1:06.16	1:07.02	4:25.00	+3.10
8	Austria (AUT-1)	Erwin Thaler; Josef Nairz	1:05.72	1:06.98	1:06.48	1:06.33	4:25.51	+3.61
9	Austria (AUT-2)	Franz Isser; Reinhold Durnthaler	1:06.94	1:06.71	1:07.40	1:07.04	4:28.09	+6.19
10	Switzerland (SUI-1)	Hans Zoller; Robert Zimmermann	1:06.97	1:06.20	1:07.60	1:07.38	4:28.15	+6.25
11	Canada (CAN-1)	John Emery; Gordon Currie	1:07.85	1:07.64	1:06.75	1:06.63	4:28.87	+6.97
12	Sweden (SWE-1)	Kjell Lutteman; Heino Freyberg	1:06.81	1:06.99	1:07.93	1:07.20	4:28.93	+7.03
13	Romania (ROU-1)	Ion Panţuru; Hariton Pașovschi	1:07.74	1:06.97	1:06.92	1:07.47	4:29.10	+7.20
14	United Team of Germany (EUA-2)	Hans Maurer; Rupert Grasegger	1:06.72	1:07.76	1:06.92	1:08.37	4:29.77	+7.87
15	Romania (ROU-2)	Alexandru Oancea; Constantin Cotacu	1:07.31	1:08.93	1:06.75	1:07.26	4:30.25	+8.35
16	Great Britain (GBR-2)	Bill McCowen; Andrew Hedges	1:07.47	1:07.73	1:06.52	1:08.95	4:30.67	+8.77
17	Switzerland (SUI-2)	Herbert Kiesel; Oskar Lory	1:07.33	1:07.70	1:07.92	1:08.25	4:31.20	+9.30
18	Argentina (ARG-1)	Héctor Tomasi; Fernando Rodríguez	1:07.59	1:09.20	1:07.36	1:07.72	4:31.87	+9.97
19	Argentina (ARG-2)	Roberto José Bordeu; Hernán Agote	1:10.15	1:08.45	1:11.33	1:10.26	4:40.19	+18.29
DNF	Belgium (BEL-1)	Jean-Marie Buisset; Claude Englebert	1:09.63	1:10.01				
DNF	Sweden (SWE-2)	Jan-Erik Åkerström; Carl-Erik Eriksson	1:08.01	1:11.81				
