= Bobsleigh at the 1964 Winter Olympics – Four-man =

Four-man at the IX Olympic Winter Games
- Venue: Bob und Rodelbahn Igls
- Dates: 5–7 February 1964
- Competitors: 73 from 11 nations
- Winning time: 4:14.46

Medalists
1st place, gold medalist(s)		Peter Kirby; Doug Anakin; John Emery; Vic Emery	Canada
2nd place, silver medalist(s)		Erwin Thaler; Adolf Koxeder; Josef Nairz; Reinhold Durnthaler	Austria
3rd place, bronze medalist(s)		Eugenio Monti; Sergio Siorpaes; Benito Rigoni; Gildo Siorpaes	Italy

Four-man bobsleigh at the 1964 Winter Olympics took place on 5 and 7 February at Bob und Rodelbahn Igls, Innsbruck, Austria. This event was last run at the 1956 Winter Olympics, as bobsleigh was not part of the 1960 games.

The winning athletes were those who posted the shortest total time over four separate runs. Canada were surprise gold medal winners, having first entered a bobsleigh team in a competitive event only 8 years previous. Favourites for the event were the Italians who finished in 3rd and 4th. Second place Austria never had an individual run which was quicker than third best, but their consistency earned them the silver medal.

== Results ==
Rank	Country	Athletes	Run 1	Run 2	Run 3	Run 4	Total	Behind
1st place, gold medalist(s)	Canada (CAN-1)	Peter Kirby; Doug Anakin; John Emery; Vic Emery	1:02.99	1:03.82	1:03.64	1:04.01	4:14.46	—
2nd place, silver medalist(s)	Austria (AUT-1)	Erwin Thaler; Adolf Koxeder; Josef Nairz; Reinhold Durnthaler	1:03.67	1:03.94	1:03.74	1:04.13	4:15.48	+1.02
3rd place, bronze medalist(s)	Italy (ITA-2)	Eugenio Monti; Sergio Siorpaes; Benito Rigoni; Gildo Siorpaes	1:03.43	1:04.07	1:04.02	1:04.08	4:15.60	+1.14
4	Italy (ITA-1)	Sergio Zardini; Sergio Mocellini; Ferruccio Dalla Torre; Romano Bonagura	1:03.95	1:04.10	1:03.59	1:04.25	4:15.89	+1.43
5	United Team of Germany (EUA-1)	Franz Schelle; Ludwig Siebert; Josef Sterff; Otto Göbl	1:04.21	1:03.50	1:04.15	1:04.33	4:16.19	+1.73
6	United States (USA-1)	Bill Hickey; Reg Benham; Bill Dundon; Chuck Pandolph	1:03.90	1:04.11	1:04.43	1:04.79	4:17.23	+2.77
7	Austria (AUT-2)	Paul Aste; Herbert Gruber; Andreas Arnold; Hans Stoll	1:04.65	1:04.40	1:04.43	1:04.25	4:17.13	+2.67
8	Switzerland (SUI-2)	Herbert Kiesel; Bernhard Wild; Hansruedi Beugger; Oskar Lory	1:04.33	1:04.54	1:04.65	1:04.60	4:18.12	+3.66
9	United Team of Germany (EUA-2)	Franz Wörmann; Anton Wackerle; Rupert Grasegger; Hubert Braun	1:04.47	1:04.42	1:05.25	1:04.54	4:18.68	+4.22
10	Switzerland (SUI-1)	Hans Zoller; Hans Kleinpeter; Fritz Lüdi; Robert Zimmermann	1:04.83	1:04.52	1:04.97	1:04.73	4:19.05	+4.59
11	Sweden (SWE-1)	Kjell Holmström; Walter Aronson; Kjell Lutteman; Carl-Erik Eriksson; Heino Freyberg	1:04.26	1:04.04	1:04.56	1:06.38	4:19.24	+4.78
12	Great Britain (GBR-1)	Tony Nash; Guy Renwick; David Lewis; Robin Dixon	1:04.56	1:05.07	1:04.64	1:05.13	4:19.40	+4.94
13	Great Britain (GBR-2)	Bill McCowen; Robin Widdows; Robin Seel; Andrew Hedges	1:04.49	1:04.68	1:05.53	1:04.73	4:19.43	+4.97
14	Canada (CAN-2)	Monty Gordon; Christopher Ondaatje; David Hobart; Gordon Currie	1:04.63	1:04.43	1:05.06	1:05.66	4:19.78	+5.32
15	Romania (ROU-1)	Ion Panţuru; Gheorghe Maftei; Constantin Cotacu; Hariton Pașovschi	1:04.70	1:04.89	1:05.05	1:05.16	4:19.80	+5.34
16	Argentina (ARG-1)	Héctor Tomasi; Carlos Alberto Tomasi; Hernán Agote; Fernando Rodríguez	1:05.74	1:06.08	1:07.07	1:06.62	4:25.51	+11.05
17	Belgium (BEL-1)	Jean de Crawhez; Thierry De Borchgrave; Charly Bouvy; Camille Liénard; Jean-Marie Buisset	1:07.46	1:05.56	1:06.51	1:06.31	4:25.84	+11.38
DNF	United States (USA-2)	Larry McKillip; Bob Rogers; Mike Baumgartner; Jim Lamy	1:03.92	1:04.22				
