= Bobsleigh at the 1964 Winter Olympics =

Bobsleigh at the IX Olympic Winter Games
- Venue: Innsbruck, Austria
- Dates: 31 January – 7 February 1964
- Competitors: 81 from 11 nations

The Bobsleigh 1964 Winter Olympics events took place between 31 January and 7 February 1964 at Bob und Rodelbahn Igls, Innsbruck, Austria. This marked the return of Bobsleigh to the Winter Olympic Games as no bob events took place at the 1960 Winter Olympics.

== Events ==
Event	Gold		Silver		Bronze	
Two-man	Great Britain; Tony Nash; Robin Thomas Dixon	4:21.90	Italy; Sergio Zardini; Romano Bonagura	4:22.02	Italy; Eugenio Monti; Sergio Siorpaes	4:22.63
Four-man	Canada; Peter Kirby; Doug Anakin; John Emery; Vic Emery	4:14.46	Austria; Erwin Thaler; Adolf Koxeder; Josef Nairz; Reinhold Durnthaler	4:15.48	Italy; Eugenio Monti; Sergio Siorpaes; Benito Rigoni; Gildo Siorpaes	4:15.60

== Medal table ==
Rank	Nation	Gold	Silver	Bronze	Total
1	Canada	1	0	0	1
1	Great Britain	1	0	0	1
3	Italy	0	1	2	3
4	Austria	0	1	0	1
Totals (4 entries)		2	2	2	6

== Participating nations ==
- Argentina (5)
- Austria (9)
- Belgium (6)
- Canada (8)
- United Team of Germany (9)
- Great Britain (9)
- Italy (8)
- Romania (5)
- Sweden (6)
- Switzerland (8)
- United States (9)
