= Austria at the 1964 Winter Olympics =

- IOC code: AUT
- NOC: Austrian Olympic Committee
- Website: www.olympia.at (in German)

in Innsbruck
- Competitors: 83 (69 men, 14 women) in 10 sports
- Flag bearer: Regine Heitzer (figure skating)
- Medals Ranked 2nd: Gold 4 Silver 5 Bronze 3 Total 12

Winter Olympics appearances (overview)
- 1924; 1928; 1932; 1936; 1948; 1952; 1956; 1960; 1964; 1968; 1972; 1976; 1980; 1984; 1988; 1992; 1994; 1998; 2002; 2006; 2010; 2014; 2018; 2022; 2026

Austria was the host nation of the 1964 Winter Olympics in Innsbruck.

== Medalists ==
Medal	Name	Sport	Event
Gold	Egon Zimmermann	Alpine skiing	Men's downhill
Gold	Pepi Stiegler	Alpine skiing	Men's slalom
Gold	Christl Haas	Alpine skiing	Women's downhill
Gold	Josef Feistmantl; Manfred Stengl	Luge	Men's doubles
Silver	Karl Schranz	Alpine skiing	Men's giant slalom
Silver	Edith Zimmermann	Alpine skiing	Women's downhill
Silver	Erwin Thaler; Adolf Koxeder; Josef Nairz; Reinhold Durnthaler	Bobsleigh	Four-man
Silver	Regine Heitzer	Figure skating	Women's singles
Silver	Reinhold Senn; Helmut Thaler	Luge	Men's doubles
Bronze	Pepi Stiegler	Alpine skiing	Men's giant slalom
Bronze	Traudl Hecher	Alpine skiing	Women's downhill
Bronze	Leni Thurner	Luge	Women's singles

== Alpine skiing ==
Men

Athlete	Event	Race	
Athlete	Event	Time	Rank
Karl Schranz	Downhill	2:20.98	11
Heini Meßner	Downhill	2:20.74	10
Gerhard Nenning	Downhill	2:19.98	7
Egon Zimmermann	Downhill	2:18.16	1st place, gold medalist(s)
Egon Zimmermann	Giant Slalom	DNF	–
Gerhard Nenning	Giant Slalom	1:49.68	6
Pepi Stiegler	Giant Slalom	1:48.05	3rd place, bronze medalist(s)
Karl Schranz	Giant Slalom	1:47.09	2nd place, silver medalist(s)

Men's slalom

Athlete	Qualifying				Final					
Athlete	Time 1	Rank	Time 2	Rank	Time 1	Rank	Time 2	Rank	Total	Rank
Hias Leitner	54.90	20 QF	–	–	1:17.07	29	1:02.57	12	2:19.64	21
Gerhard Nenning	53.60	10 QF	–	–	1:10.29	4	1:02.91	13	2:13.20	7
Karl Schranz	53.55	8 QF	–	–	1:10.04	2	1:11.54	36	2:21.58	24
Pepi Stiegler	53.41	6 QF	–	–	1:09.03	1	1:02.10	8	2:11.13	1st place, gold medalist(s)

Women

Athlete	Event	Race 1		Race 2		Total	
Athlete	Event	Time	Rank	Time	Rank	Time	Rank
Edda Kainz	Downhill					2:02.69	22
Traudl Hecher	Downhill					1:56.66	3rd place, bronze medalist(s)
Edith Zimmermann	Downhill					1:56.42	2nd place, silver medalist(s)
Christl Haas	Downhill					1:55.39	1st place, gold medalist(s)
Marianne Jahn-Nutt	Giant Slalom					1:55.95	13
Traudl Hecher	Giant Slalom					1:54.55	8
Edith Zimmermann	Giant Slalom					1:54.21	6
Christl Haas	Giant Slalom					1:53.86	4
Marianne Jahn-Nutt	Slalom	DNF	–	–	–	DNF	–
Christl Haas	Slalom	46.43	10	48.68	5	1:35.11	6
Edith Zimmermann	Slalom	46.24	9	48.03	4	1:34.27	5
Traudl Hecher	Slalom	44.52	3	DNF	–	DNF	–

== Biathlon ==
Men

Event	Athlete	Time	Misses	Adjusted time ^{1}	Rank
20 km	Paul Ernst	DNF	–	–	DNF
20 km	Adolf Scherwitzl	1'36:12.7	6	1'48:12.7	41
20 km	Walter Müller	1'25:12.3	7	1'39:12.3	34
20 km	Hansjörg Farbmacher	1'28:11.3	4	1'36:11.3	28

^{1} Two minutes added per miss.

== Bobsleigh ==
Sled	Athletes	Event	Run 1		Run 2		Run 3		Run 4		Total	
Sled	Athletes	Event	Time	Rank	Time	Rank	Time	Rank	Time	Rank	Time	Rank
AUT-1	Erwin Thaler; Josef Nairz	Two-man	1:05.72	4	1:06.98	11	1:06.48	8	1:06.33	5	4:25.51	8
AUT-2	Franz Isser; Reinhold Durnthaler	Two-man	1:06.94	11	1:06.71	9	1:07.40	15	1:07.04	10	4:28.09	9

Sled	Athletes	Event	Run 1		Run 2		Run 3		Run 4		Total	
Sled	Athletes	Event	Time	Rank	Time	Rank	Time	Rank	Time	Rank	Time	Rank
AUT-1	Erwin Thaler; Adolf Koxeder; Josef Nairz; Reinhold Durnthaler	Four-man	1:03.67	3	1:03.94	3	1:03.74	3	1:04.13	3	4:15.48	2nd place, silver medalist(s)
AUT-2	Paul Aste; Herbert Gruber; Andreas Arnold; Hans Stoll	Four-man	1:04.65	14	1:04.40	9	1:04.43	6	1:04.25	4	4:17.73	7

== Cross-country skiing ==
Men

Event	Athlete	Race	
Event	Athlete	Time	Rank
15 km	Günther Rieger	1'01:07.3	59
15 km	Anton Kogler	59:10.6	53
15 km	Hubert Schrott	59:01.7	52
15 km	Hermann Lackner	58:04.0	48
30 km	Franz Vetter	DNF	–
30 km	Hermann Mayr	1'48:53.3	56
30 km	Hansjörg Farbmacher	1'41:37.1	36
30 km	Andreas Janc	1'40:23.3	31
50 km	Hermann Mayr	3'08:48.6	33
50 km	Andreas Janc	2'58:43.8	21

Men's 4 × 10 km relay

Athletes	Race	
Athletes	Time	Rank
Günther Rieger; Hansjörg Farbmacher; Anton Kogler; Andreas Janc	2'34:48.9	11

Women

Event	Athlete	Race	
Event	Athlete	Time	Rank
5 km	Heiderun Ludwig	20:11.3	20
10 km	Heiderun Ludwig	47:27.6	25

== Figure skating ==
Men

Athlete	CF	FS	Points	Places	Rank
Wolfgang Schwarz	17	13	1695.9	127	15
Peter Jonas	9	6	1752.0	79	7
Emmerich Danzer	5	3	1824.0	42	5

Women

Athlete	CF	FS	Points	Places	Rank
Ingrid Ostler	16	20	1684.8	171	20
Helli Sengtschmid	18	3	1782.1	85	9
Regine Heitzer	2	5	1945.5	22	2nd place, silver medalist(s)

Pairs

Athletes	Points	Places	Rank
Ingeborg Strell; Ferdinand Dedovich	83.6	129	15
Gerlinde Schönbauer; Wilhelm Bietak	87.7	108	12

== Ice hockey ==
=== First round ===
Winners (in bold) qualified for the Group A to play for 1st-8th places. Teams, which lost their qualification matches, played in Group B for 9th-16th places.

Team 1	Score	Team 2
Austria	2–8	**Finland**

=== Consolation Round ===
Rank	Team	Pld	W	L	T	GF	GA	Pts
9	Poland	7	6	1	0	40	13	12
10	Norway	7	5	2	0	40	19	10
11	Japan	7	4	2	1	35	31	9
12	Romania	7	3	3	1	31	28	7
13	Austria	7	3	3	1	24	28	7
14	Yugoslavia	7	3	3	1	29	37	7
15	Italy	7	2	5	0	24	42	4
16	Hungary	7	0	7	0	14	39	0

- Austria 6-2 Yugoslavia
- Austria 3-0 Hungary
- Austria 5-5 Japan
- Austria 2-5 Romania
- Austria 5-3 Italy
- Austria 2-8 Norway
- Austria 1-5 Poland

**Contestants**; Adolf Bachura; Horst Kakl; Dieter Kalt; Christian Kirchberger; Hermann Knoll; Eduard Mössmer; Tassilo Neuwirth; Alfred Püls; Sepp Puschnig; Erich Romauch; Fritz Spielmann; Sel Saint John; Gustav Tischer; Friedrich Turek; Fritz Wechselberger; Erich Winkler; Walter Znenahlik

== Luge ==
Men

Athlete	Run 1		Run 2		Run 3		Run 4		Total	
Athlete	Time	Rank	Time	Rank	Time	Rank	Time	Rank	Time	Rank
Franz Tiefenbacher	53.31	11	53.04	8	54.00	13	53.51	8	3:33.86	8
Manfred Schmid	53.27	10	52.86	7	53.82	12	54.09	13	3:34.04	9
Reinhold Senn	52.32	5	1:03.85	28	53.43	7	53.37	5	3:42.97	21
Josef Feistmantl	52.14	4	52.58	4	53.51	8	53.11	3	3:31.34	5

(Men's) Doubles

Athletes	Run 1		Run 2		Total	
Athletes	Time	Rank	Time	Rank	Time	Rank
Josef Feistmantl; Manfred Stengl	50.57	1	51.05	2	1:41.62	1st place, gold medalist(s)
Reinhold Senn; Helmut Thaler	51.02	2	50.89	1	1:41.91	2nd place, silver medalist(s)

Women

Athlete	Run 1		Run 2		Run 3		Run 4		Total	
Athlete	Time	Rank	Time	Rank	Time	Rank	Time	Rank	Time	Rank
Antonia Lanthaler	54.30	11	DNF	–	–	–	–	–	DNF	–
Friederike Matejka	53.61	8	52.98	5	53.94	8	54.15	9	3:34.68	7
Leni Thurner	52.08	4	52.08	3	52.42	5	52.48	3	3:29.06	3rd place, bronze medalist(s)

== Nordic combined ==
Events:

- normal hill ski jumping (Three jumps, best two counted and shown here.)
- 15 km cross-country skiing

Athlete	Event	Ski Jumping				Cross-country			Total	
Athlete	Event	Distance 1	Distance 2	Points	Rank	Time	Points	Rank	Points	Rank
Leopold Kohl	Individual	57.0	64.5	181.6	25	57:09.8	160.26	29	341.86	28
Waldemar Heigenhauser	Individual	67.5	67.0	210.4	11	56:24.1	168.32	25	378.72	19
Willy Köstinger	Individual	70.5	66.5	225.5	5	54:35.5	188.18	18	413.68	10
Franz Scherübl	Individual	54.5	61.0	169.6	27	56:19.9	169.00	24	338.60	29

== Ski jumping ==
Athletes performed three jumps, the best two were counted and are shown here.

Athlete	Event	Jump 1		Jump 2		Total	
Athlete	Event	Distance	Points	Distance	Points	Points	Rank
Willi Egger	Normal hill	71.0	94.5	71.5	92.9	187.4	44
Sepp Lichtenegger	Normal hill	75.0	102.1	75.0	103.3	205.4	11
Otto Leodolter	Normal hill	74.0	99.7	72.0	97.6	197.3	28
Baldur Preiml	Normal hill	75.0	101.1	76.0	103.5	204.6	13
Sepp Lichtenegger	Large hill	87.0	102.0	68.0	77.9	179.9	43
Otto Leodolter	Large hill	87.0	101.1	85.0	102.9	204.0	17
Willi Egger	Large hill	86.5	100.0	87.0	106.0	206.0	12
Baldur Preiml	Large hill	87.0	106.0	78.0	97.2	203.2	18

== Speed skating ==
Men

Event	Athlete	Race	
Event	Athlete	Time	Rank
500 m	Peter Toyfl	43.7	36
500 m	Manfred Zojer	43.5	35
1500 m	Erich Korbel	DSQ	–
1500 m	Josef Reisinger	2:27.8	51
1500 m	Peter Toyfl	2:24.2	48
1500 m	Hermann Strutz	2:18.0	33
5000 m	Gerhard Strutz	8:50.4	42
5000 m	Reinhold Seeböck	8:29.6	37
5000 m	Hermann Strutz	7:48.3	5
10,000 m	Hermann Strutz	16:42.6	11
