= Austria at the Olympics =

- IOC code: AUT
- NOC: Austrian Olympic Committee
- Website: www.olympia.at (in German)
- Medals Ranked 20th: Gold 97 Silver 131 Bronze 139 Total 367

Summer appearances
- 1896; 1900; 1904; 1908; 1912; 1920; 1924; 1928; 1932; 1936; 1948; 1952; 1956; 1960; 1964; 1968; 1972; 1976; 1980; 1984; 1988; 1992; 1996; 2000; 2004; 2008; 2012; 2016; 2020; 2024

Winter appearances
- 1924; 1928; 1932; 1936; 1948; 1952; 1956; 1960; 1964; 1968; 1972; 1976; 1980; 1984; 1988; 1992; 1994; 1998; 2002; 2006; 2010; 2014; 2018; 2022; 2026

Other related appearances
- 1906 Intercalated Games

Austria has competed at all of the modern Olympic Games, with the exception of the 1920 Summer Olympics, from which it was barred for being part of the Central Powers in World War I.

Austria has won more medals in alpine skiing than any other nation in the world.

The National Olympic Committee for Austria is the Austrian Olympic Committee, and was created in 1908 and recognized in 1912.

== Hosted Games ==
Innsbruck is the only city in Austria that has hosted the games. It has done so on two occasions, both in winter.

Games	Host city	Dates	Nations	Participants	Events
1964 Winter Olympics	Innsbruck, Tyrol	29 January – 9 February	36	1,091	34
1976 Winter Olympics	Innsbruck, Tyrol	4 – 15 February	37	1,123	37

== Medal tables ==
=== Medals by Summer Games ===
Games	Athletes	Gold	Silver	Bronze	Total	Rank
(Kingdom of Greece) 1896 Athens	3	2	1	2	5	7
(French Third Republic) 1900 Paris	13	0	3	3	6	15
(United States) 1904 St. Louis	did not participate					
(United Kingdom) 1908 London	7	0	0	1	1	19
(Sweden) 1912 Stockholm	85	0	2	2	4	17
(Belgium) 1920 Antwerp	did not participate					
(French Third Republic) 1924 Paris	49	0	3	1	4	20
(Netherlands) 1928 Amsterdam	73	2	0	1	3	18
(United States) 1932 Los Angeles	19	1	1	3	5	18
(Nazi Germany) 1936 Berlin	234	4	6	3	13	11
(United Kingdom) 1948 London	144	1	0	3	4	21
(Finland) 1952 Helsinki	112	0	1	1	2	32
(Australia) 1956 Melbourne	29	0	0	2	2	34
(Italy) 1960 Rome	103	1	1	0	2	18
(Japan) 1964 Tokyo	56	0	0	0	0	–
1968 Mexico City	43	0	2	2	4	32
(West Germany) 1972 Munich	111	0	1	2	3	31
(Canada) 1976 Montreal	60	0	0	1	1	37
(Soviet Union) 1980 Moscow	82	1	2	1	4	21
(United States) 1984 Los Angeles	102	1	1	1	3	22
(South Korea) 1988 Seoul	73	1	0	0	1	29
(Spain) 1992 Barcelona	102	0	2	0	2	41
(United States) 1996 Atlanta	72	0	1	2	3	57
(Australia) 2000 Sydney	92	2	1	0	3	32
(Greece) 2004 Athens	74	2	4	1	7	27
(China) 2008 Beijing	72	0	1	2	3	61
(United Kingdom) 2012 London	70	0	0	0	0	–
(Brazil) 2016 Rio de Janeiro	71	0	0	1	1	78
(Japan) 2020 Tokyo	75	1	1	5	7	53
(France) 2024 Paris	78	2	0	3	5	36
(United States) 2028 Los Angeles	future event					
(Australia) 2032 Brisbane	future event					
Total (28/30)	2,104	21	34	43	98	42

Notes

- ^{ART} Art competitions (1912–1948) are not included in the medal table above, as they were non-sports events formerly part of the Olympic Games. (Note: In 1952, art competition medals, as well as the gold medal awards for feats in alpinism and aeronautics, were removed from the official national medal counts. Only since 2021 have they been officially listed again by the IOC in the medal tables and respective National Olympic Committee (NOC) profiles on its website.) Austria won a total of nine art competition medals (3 gold, 3 silver, and 3 bronze), across the 1928, 1936, and 1948 Summer Olympics.
- ^{NAT} Athletes at the early Olympic Games (1896, 1900, and 1904) are attributed by the International Olympic Committee (IOC) according to the national affiliation of their club or team, rather than their nationality. (Note: In 2024, the IOC reinstated its original and current attribution policy for athletes at the early Olympic Games (1896, 1900, and 1904). From 2021 to 2024, the IOC briefly attributed medals in individual events according to the athlete's nationality, even when the athlete represented a foreign club or team. Since 2024, participation and medals have instead been attributed according to the national affiliation of the club or team represented by the athlete.) Austrians Julius Lenhart (gymnastics; one gold and one silver) and Otto Wahle (swimming; one bronze) each represented American clubs, and their participation and medals were therefore attributed to the United States.

=== Medals by Winter Games ===
Host country

Games	Athletes	Gold	Silver	Bronze	Total	Rank
(France) 1924 Chamonix	4	2	1	0	3	3
(Switzerland) 1928 St. Moritz	39	0	3	1	4	7
(United States) 1932 Lake Placid	7	1	1	0	2	6
(Nazi Germany) 1936 Garmisch-Partenkirchen	60	1	1	2	4	6
(Switzerland) 1948 St. Moritz	54	1	3	4	8	7
(Norway) 1952 Oslo	39	2	4	2	8	5
(Italy) 1956 Cortina d'Ampezzo	60	4	3	4	11	2
(United States) 1960 Squaw Valley	26	1	2	3	6	9
(Austria) 1964 Innsbruck	83	4	5	3	12	2
(France) 1968 Grenoble	76	3	4	4	11	5
(Japan) 1972 Sapporo	40	1	2	2	5	9
(Austria) 1976 Innsbruck	77	2	2	2	6	7
(United States) 1980 Lake Placid	43	3	2	2	7	4
(Socialist Federal Republic of Yugoslavia) 1984 Sarajevo	65	0	0	1	1	17
(Canada) 1988 Calgary	81	3	5	2	10	6
(France) 1992 Albertville	58	6	7	8	21	4
(Norway) 1994 Lillehammer	80	2	3	4	9	9
(Japan) 1998 Nagano	96	3	5	9	17	8
(United States) 2002 Salt Lake City	90	3	4	10	17	10
(Italy) 2006 Turin	73	9	7	7	23	3
(Canada) 2010 Vancouver	80	4	6	7	17	9
(Russia) 2014 Sochi	130	4	9	4	17	9
(South Korea) 2018 Pyeongchang	105	5	3	6	14	10
(China) 2022 Beijing	106	7	7	4	18	7
(Italy) 2026 Milano Cortina	115	5	8	5	18	9
(France) 2030 French Alps	future event					
(United States) 2034 Utah	future event					
Total (25/25)	1,687	76	97	96	269	6

=== Medals by summer sport ===
Sport	Gold	Silver	Bronze	Total
Sailing	5	4	1	10
Canoeing	3	5	6	14
Weightlifting	3	4	2	9
Judo	2	3	3	8
Cycling	2	0	2	4
Swimming	1	6	4	11
Athletics	1	2	5	8
Shooting	1	2	5	8
Fencing	1	1	5	7
Equestrian	1	1	1	3
Triathlon	1	0	0	1
Rowing	0	3	3	6
Football	0	1	0	1
Handball	0	1	0	1
Tennis	0	1	0	1
Sport climbing	0	0	3	3
Wrestling	0	0	2	2
Karate	0	0	1	1
Totals (18 entries)	21	34	43	98

=== Medals by winter sport ===
Leading in that sport

Sport	Gold	Silver	Bronze	Total
Alpine skiing	41	46	45	132
Ski jumping	8	10	10	28
Figure skating	7	9	4	20
Snowboarding	7	3	5	15
Luge	6	13	10	29
Nordic combined	3	4	12	19
Cross country skiing	1	2	3	6
Speed skating	1	2	3	6
Bobsleigh	1	2	0	3
Skeleton	1	1	0	2
Biathlon	0	4	3	7
Freestyle skiing	0	1	1	2
Totals (12 entries)	76	97	96	269

== List of medalists ==
=== Summer Olympics ===
==== Reallocated medals ====
Athletes at the early Olympic Games (1896, 1900, and 1904) are attributed by the International Olympic Committee (IOC) according to the national affiliation of their club ot team, rather than their nationality. Austrian Julius Lenhart competed at the 1904 Summer Olympics, winning a gold medal and a silver medal in gymnastics. As he represented the American gymnastic club Philadelphia Turngemeinde, his results are attributed to the United States.

Otto Wahle was an Austrian national until 1906 when he became a US citizen, after settling in New York. He competed for Austria at both the 1900 and 1904 Olympics, while being affiliated with the New York Athletic Club at the latter Games. However, unlike in 1900, his bronze medal from 1904 is attributed to the United States because he competed for an American sports club.

Medal	Name	Sport	Event	Date	Reallocated to
Gold	Julius Lenhart	1904 St. Louis	Gymnastics	Men's artistic individual all-around	United States
Silver	Julius Lenhart	1904 St. Louis	Gymnastics	Men's triathlon (combined 3 events)	United States
Bronze	Otto Wahle	1904 St. Louis	Swimming	Men's 440 yard freestyle	United States

=== Medalists ===
Medal	Name	Games	Sport	Event
Gold	Adolf Schmal	1896 Athens	Cycling	12 hour race
Gold	Paul Neumann	1896 Athens	Swimming	500 m freestyle
Silver	Otto Herschmann	1896 Athens	Swimming	100 m freestyle
Bronze	Adolf Schmal	1896 Athens	Cycling	Time trial
Bronze	Adolf Schmal	1896 Athens	Cycling	10 km
Silver	Otto Wahle	1900 Paris	Swimming	Men's 1000 m freestyle
Silver	Karl Ruberl	1900 Paris	Swimming	Men's 200 m backstroke
Silver	Otto Wahle	1900 Paris	Swimming	Men's 200 m obstacle event
Bronze	Siegfried Flesch	1900 Paris	Fencing	Men's individual sabre
Bronze	Milan Neralić	1900 Paris	Fencing	Men's masters sabre
Bronze	Karl Ruberl	1900 Paris	Swimming	Men's 200 m freestyle
Bronze	Otto Scheff	1908 London	Swimming	Men's 400 m freestyle
Silver	Albert Bogen; Rudolf Cvetko; Friedrich Golling; Otto Herschmann; Andreas Suttner; Reinhold Trampler; Richard Verderber	1912 Stockholm	Fencing	Men's team sabre
Silver	Felix Pipes; Arthur Zborzil	1912 Stockholm	Tennis	Men's outdoor doubles
Bronze	Richard Verderber	1912 Stockholm	Fencing	Men's individual foil
Bronze	Margarete Adler; Klara Milch; Josephine Sticker; Berta Zahourek	1912 Stockholm	Swimming	Women's 4 × 100 m freestyle relay
Silver	Andreas Stadler	1924 Paris	Weightlifting	Men's 60 kg
Silver	Anton Zwerina	1924 Paris	Weightlifting	Men's 67.5 kg
Silver	Franz Aigner	1924 Paris	Weightlifting	Men's +82.5 kg
Bronze	Leopold Friedrich	1924 Paris	Weightlifting	Men's 82.5 kg
Gold	Franz Andrysek	1928 Amsterdam	Weightlifting	Men's 60 kg
Gold	Hans Haas	1928 Amsterdam	Weightlifting	Men's 67.5 kg
Bronze	Viktor Flessl; Leo Losert	1928 Amsterdam	Rowing	Men's double sculls
Gold	Ellen Preis	1932 Los Angeles	Fencing	Women's individual foil
Silver	Hans Haas	1932 Los Angeles	Weightlifting	Men's 67.5 kg
Bronze	Karl Hipfinger	1932 Los Angeles	Weightlifting	Men's 75 kg
Bronze	Nickolaus Hirschl	1932 Los Angeles	Wrestling	Men's freestyle heavyweight
Bronze	Nickolaus Hirschl	1932 Los Angeles	Wrestling	Men's Greco-Roman heavyweight
Gold	Gregor Hradetzky	1936 Berlin	Canoeing	Men's K-1 1000 m
Gold	Gregor Hradetzky	1936 Berlin	Canoeing	Men's folding K-1 10000 m
Gold	Alfons Dorfner; Adolf Kainz	1936 Berlin	Canoeing	Men's K-2 1000 m
Gold	Robert Fein	1936 Berlin	Weightlifting	Men's 67.5 kg
Silver	Karl Proisl; Rupert Weinstabl	1936 Berlin	Canoeing	Men's C-2 1000 m
Silver	Fritz Landertinger	1936 Berlin	Canoeing	Men's K-1 10000 m
Silver	Viktor Kalisch; Karl Steinhuber	1936 Berlin	Canoeing	Men's K-2 10000 m
Silver	Football team	1936 Berlin	Football	Men's tournament
Silver	Handball team	1936 Berlin	Handball	Men's tournament
Silver	Josef Hasenöhrl	1936 Berlin	Rowing	Men's single sculls
Bronze	Karl Proisl; Rupert Weinstabl	1936 Berlin	Canoeing	Men's C-2 10000 m
Bronze	Alois Podhajsky	1936 Berlin	Equestrian	Individual Dressage
Bronze	Ellen Preis	1936 Berlin	Fencing	Women's individual foil
Gold	Herma Bauma	1948 London	Athletics	Women's javelin throw
Bronze	Ine Schäffer	1948 London	Athletics	Women's shot put
Bronze	Fritzi Schwingl	1948 London	Canoeing	Women's K-1 500 metres
Bronze	Ellen Mueller	1948 London	Fencing	Women's individual foil
Silver	Gertrude Liebhart	1952 Helsinki	Canoeing	Women's K-1 500 metres
Bronze	Maximilian Raub; Herbert Wiedermann	1952 Helsinki	Canoeing	Men's K-2 1000 metres
Bronze	Maximilian Raub; Herbert Wiedermann	1956 Melbourne	Canoeing	Men's K-2 1000 metres
Bronze	Alfred Sageder; Josef Kloimstein	1956 Melbourne	Rowing	Men's coxless pairs
Gold	Hubert Hammerer	1960 Rome	Shooting	300 metre rifle three positions
Silver	Alfred Sageder; Josef Kloimstein	1960 Rome	Rowing	Men's coxless pairs
Silver	Hubert Raudaschl	1968 Mexico City	Sailing	Men's finn class
Silver	Liese Prokop	1968 Mexico City	Athletics	Women's pentathlon
Bronze	Eva Janko	1968 Mexico City	Athletics	Women's javelin throw
Bronze	Günther Pfaff; Gerhard Seibold	1968 Mexico City	Canoeing	Men's K-2 1000 metres
Silver	Norbert Sattler	1972 Munich	Canoeing	Men's K-1
Bronze	Ilona Gusenbauer	1972 Munich	Athletics	Women's high jump
Bronze	Rudolf Dollinger	1972 Munich	Shooting	50 metre pistol
Bronze	Rudolf Dollinger	1976 Montreal	Shooting	50 metre pistol
Gold	Elisabeth Theurer	1980 Moscow	Equestrian	Individual dressage
Silver	Wolfgang Mayrhofer	1980 Moscow	Sailing	Men's finn class
Silver	Hubert Raudaschl; Karl Ferstl	1980 Moscow	Sailing	Star class
Bronze	Gerhard Petritsch	1980 Moscow	Shooting	25 metre rapid fire pistol
Gold	Peter Seisenbacher	1984 Los Angeles	Judo	Men's middleweight
Silver	Andreas Kronthaler	1984 Los Angeles	Shooting	Men's 10 metre air rifle
Bronze	Josef Reiter	1984 Los Angeles	Judo	Men's half-lightweight
Gold	Peter Seisenbacher	1988 Seoul	Judo	Men's middleweight
Silver	Thomas Frühmann; Jörg Münzner; Hugo Simon	1992 Barcelona	Equestrian	Jumping team
Silver	Arnold Jonke; Christoph Zerbst	1992 Barcelona	Rowing	Men's double sculls
Silver	Wolfram Waibel	1996 Atlanta	Shooting	Men's 10 metre air rifle
Bronze	Theresia Kiesl	1996 Atlanta	Athletics	Women's 1500 metres
Bronze	Wolfram Waibel	1996 Atlanta	Shooting	Men's 50 metre rifle three positions
Gold	Christoph Sieber	2000 Sydney	Sailing	Men's mistral class
Gold	Roman Hagara; Hans-Peter Steinacher	2000 Sydney	Sailing	Tornado class
Silver	Stephanie Graf	2000 Sydney	Athletics	Women's 800 metres
Gold	Roman Hagara; Hans-Peter Steinacher	2004 Athens	Sailing	Tornado class
Gold	Kate Allen	2004 Athens	Triathlon	Women's individual
Silver	Claudia Heill	2004 Athens	Judo	Women's half-middleweight
Silver	Andreas Geritzer	2004 Athens	Sailing	Laser class
Silver	Markus Rogan	2004 Athens	Swimming	Men's 100 metre backstroke
Silver	Markus Rogan	2004 Athens	Swimming	Men's 200 metre backstroke
Bronze	Christian Planer	2004 Athens	Shooting	Men's 50 metre rifle three positions
Silver	Ludwig Paischer	2008 Beijing	Judo	Men's extra-lightweight
Bronze	Violetta Oblinger-Peters	2008 Beijing	Canoeing	Women's slalom K-1
Bronze	Mirna Jukić	2008 Beijing	Swimming	Women's 100 metre breaststroke
Bronze	Thomas Zajac; Tanja Frank	2016 Rio de Janeiro	Sailing	Nacra 17
Gold	Anna Kiesenhofer	2020 Tokyo	Cycling	Women's Road Race
Silver	Michaela Polleres	2020 Tokyo	Judo	Women's 70 kg
Bronze	Lukas Weißhaidinger	2020 Tokyo	Athletics	Men's discus throw
Bronze	Shamil Borchashvili	2020 Tokyo	Judo	Men's 81 kg
Bronze	Bettina Plank	2020 Tokyo	Karate	Women's 55 kg
Bronze	Magdalena Lobnig	2020 Tokyo	Rowing	Women's single sculls
Bronze	Jakob Schubert	2020 Tokyo	Sport climbing	Men's combined
Bronze	Magdalena Lobnig	2020 Tokyo	Rowing	Women's single sculls
Gold	Lara Vadlau; Lukas Mähr	2024 Paris	Sailing	Mixed 470
Gold	Valentin Bontus	2024 Paris	Sailing	Men's Formula Kite
Bronze	Michaela Polleres	2024 Paris	Judo	Women's 70 kg
Bronze	Jakob Schubert	2024 Paris	Sport climbing	Men's combined
Bronze	Jessica Pilz	2024 Paris	Sport climbing	Women's combined

=== Winter Olympics ===
Medal	Name	Games	Sport	Event
Gold	Herma Planck-Szabó	1924 Chamonix	Figure skating	Ladies' singles
Gold	Helene Engelmann; Alfred Berger	1924 Chamonix	Figure skating	Pair skating
Silver	Willy Böckl	1924 Chamonix	Figure skating	Men's singles
Silver	Fritzi Burger	1928 St. Moritz	Figure skating	Ladies' singles
Silver	Willy Böckl	1928 St. Moritz	Figure skating	Men's singles
Silver	Lilly Scholz; Otto Kaiser	1928 St. Moritz	Figure skating	Pair skating
Bronze	Melitta Brunner; Ludwig Wrede	1928 St. Moritz	Figure skating	Pair skating
Gold	Karl Schäfer	1932 Lake Placid	Figure skating	Men's singles
Silver	Fritzi Burger	1932 Lake Placid	Figure skating	Ladies' singles
Gold	Karl Schäfer	1936 Garmisch-Partenkirchen	Figure skating	Men's singles
Silver	Ilse Pausin; Erik Pausin	1936 Garmisch-Partenkirchen	Figure skating	Pair skating
Bronze	Felix Kaspar	1936 Garmisch-Partenkirchen	Figure skating	Men's singles
Bronze	Max Stiepl	1936 Garmisch-Partenkirchen	Speed skating	Men's 10000m
Gold	Trude Jochum-Beiser	1948 St. Moritz	Alpine skiing	Women's combined
Silver	Franz Gabl	1948 St. Moritz	Alpine skiing	Men's downhill
Silver	Trude Jochum-Beiser	1948 St. Moritz	Alpine skiing	Women's downhill
Silver	Eva Pawlik	1948 St. Moritz	Figure skating	Ladies' singles
Bronze	Erika Mahringer	1948 St. Moritz	Alpine skiing	Women's combined
Bronze	Resi Hammerer	1948 St. Moritz	Alpine skiing	Women's downhill
Bronze	Erika Mahringer	1948 St. Moritz	Alpine skiing	Women's slalom
Bronze	Edi Rada	1948 St. Moritz	Figure skating	Men's singles
Gold	Othmar Schneider	1952 Oslo	Alpine skiing	Men's slalom
Gold	Trude Beiser	1952 Oslo	Alpine skiing	Women's downhill
Silver	Othmar Schneider	1952 Oslo	Alpine skiing	Men's downhill
Silver	Christian Pravda	1952 Oslo	Alpine skiing	Men's giant slalom
Silver	Dagmar Rom	1952 Oslo	Alpine skiing	Women's giant slalom
Silver	Helmut Seibt	1952 Oslo	Figure skating	Men's singles
Bronze	Christian Pravda	1952 Oslo	Alpine skiing	Men's downhill
Bronze	Toni Spiß	1952 Oslo	Alpine skiing	Men's giant slalom
Gold	Toni Sailer	1956 Cortina d'Ampezzo	Alpine skiing	Men's downhill
Gold	Toni Sailer	1956 Cortina d'Ampezzo	Alpine skiing	Men's giant slalom
Gold	Toni Sailer	1956 Cortina d'Ampezzo	Alpine skiing	Men's slalom
Gold	Sissy Schwarz; Kurt Oppelt	1956 Cortina d'Ampezzo	Figure skating	Pair skating
Silver	Anderl Molterer	1956 Cortina d'Ampezzo	Alpine skiing	Men's giant slalom
Silver	Putzi Frandl	1956 Cortina d'Ampezzo	Alpine skiing	Women's giant slalom
Silver	Regina Schöpf	1956 Cortina d'Ampezzo	Alpine skiing	Women's slalom
Bronze	Anderl Molterer	1956 Cortina d'Ampezzo	Alpine skiing	Men's downhill
Bronze	Walter Schuster	1956 Cortina d'Ampezzo	Alpine skiing	Men's giant slalom
Bronze	Thea Hochleitner	1956 Cortina d'Ampezzo	Alpine skiing	Women's giant slalom
Bronze	Ingrid Wendl	1956 Cortina d'Ampezzo	Figure skating	Ladies' singles
Gold	Ernst Hinterseer	1960 Squaw Valley	Alpine skiing	Men's slalom
Silver	Pepi Stiegler	1960 Squaw Valley	Alpine skiing	Men's giant slalom
Silver	Hias Leitner	1960 Squaw Valley	Alpine skiing	Men's slalom
Bronze	Ernst Hinterseer	1960 Squaw Valley	Alpine skiing	Men's giant slalom
Bronze	Traudl Hecher	1960 Squaw Valley	Alpine skiing	Women's downhill
Bronze	Otto Leodolter	1960 Squaw Valley	Ski jumping	Men's normal hill
Gold	Egon Zimmermann	1964 Innsbruck	Alpine skiing	Men's downhill
Gold	Pepi Stiegler	1964 Innsbruck	Alpine skiing	Men's slalom
Gold	Christl Haas	1964 Innsbruck	Alpine skiing	Women's downhill
Gold	Josef Feistmantl; Manfred Stengl	1964 Innsbruck	Luge	Doubles
Silver	Karl Schranz	1964 Innsbruck	Alpine skiing	Men's giant slalom
Silver	Edith Zimmermann	1964 Innsbruck	Alpine skiing	Women's downhill
Silver	Erwin Thaler; Adolf Koxeder; Josef Nairz; Reinhold Durnthaler	1964 Innsbruck	Bobsleigh	Four-man
Silver	Regine Heitzer	1964 Innsbruck	Figure skating	Ladies' singles
Silver	Reinhold Senn; Helmut Thaler	1964 Innsbruck	Luge	Doubles
Bronze	Pepi Stiegler	1964 Innsbruck	Alpine skiing	Men's giant slalom
Bronze	Traudl Hecher	1964 Innsbruck	Alpine skiing	Women's downhill
Bronze	Leni Thurner	1964 Innsbruck	Luge	Women's singles
Gold	Olga Pall	1968 Grenoble	Alpine skiing	Women's downhill
Gold	Wolfgang Schwarz	1968 Grenoble	Figure skating	Men's singles
Gold	Manfred Schmid	1968 Grenoble	Luge	Men's singles
Silver	Herbert Huber	1968 Grenoble	Alpine skiing	Men's slalom
Silver	Erwin Thaler; Reinhold Durnthaler; Herbert Gruber; Josef Eder	1968 Grenoble	Bobsleigh	Four-man
Silver	Manfred Schmid; Ewald Walch	1968 Grenoble	Luge	Doubles
Silver	Reinhold Bachler	1968 Grenoble	Ski jumping	Men's normal hill
Bronze	Heini Meßner	1968 Grenoble	Alpine skiing	Men's giant slalom
Bronze	Alfred Matt	1968 Grenoble	Alpine skiing	Men's slalom
Bronze	Christl Haas	1968 Grenoble	Alpine skiing	Women's downhill
Bronze	Baldur Preiml	1968 Grenoble	Ski jumping	Men's normal hill
Gold	Beatrix Schuba	1972 Sapporo	Figure skating	Ladies' singles
Silver	Annemarie Moser-Pröll	1972 Sapporo	Alpine skiing	Women's downhill
Silver	Annemarie Moser-Pröll	1972 Sapporo	Alpine skiing	Women's giant slalom
Bronze	Heinrich Messner	1972 Sapporo	Alpine skiing	Men's downhill
Bronze	Wiltrud Drexel	1972 Sapporo	Alpine skiing	Women's giant slalom
Gold	Franz Klammer	1976 Innsbruck	Alpine skiing	Men's downhill
Gold	Karl Schnabl	1976 Innsbruck	Ski jumping	Men's large hill
Silver	Brigitte Totschnig	1976 Innsbruck	Alpine skiing	Women's downhill
Silver	Anton Innauer	1976 Innsbruck	Ski jumping	Men's large hill
Bronze	Franz Schachner; Rudolf Schmid	1976 Innsbruck	Luge	Doubles
Bronze	Karl Schnabl	1976 Innsbruck	Ski jumping	Men's normal hill
Gold	Leonhard Stock	1980 Lake Placid	Alpine skiing	Men's downhill
Gold	Annemarie Moser-Pröll	1980 Lake Placid	Alpine skiing	Women's downhill
Gold	Anton Innauer	1980 Lake Placid	Ski jumping	Men's normal hill
Silver	Peter Wirnsberger	1980 Lake Placid	Alpine skiing	Men's downhill
Silver	Hubert Neuper	1980 Lake Placid	Ski jumping	Men's large hill
Bronze	Hans Enn	1980 Lake Placid	Alpine skiing	Men's giant slalom
Bronze	Georg Fluckinger; Karl Schrott	1980 Lake Placid	Luge	Doubles
Bronze	Anton Steiner	1984 Sarajevo	Alpine skiing	Men's downhill
Gold	Hubert Strolz	1988 Calgary	Alpine skiing	Men's combined
Gold	Anita Wachter	1988 Calgary	Alpine skiing	Women's combined
Gold	Sigrid Wolf	1988 Calgary	Alpine skiing	Women's super G
Silver	Bernhard Gstrein	1988 Calgary	Alpine skiing	Men's combined
Silver	Hubert Strolz	1988 Calgary	Alpine skiing	Men's giant slalom
Silver	Helmut Mayer	1988 Calgary	Alpine skiing	Men's super G
Silver	Klaus Sulzenbacher	1988 Calgary	Nordic combined	Men's individual
Silver	Michael Hadschieff	1988 Calgary	Speed skating	Men's 10000m
Bronze	Hansjörg Aschenwald; Günther Csar; Klaus Sulzenbacher	1988 Calgary	Nordic combined	Men's team
Bronze	Michael Hadschieff	1988 Calgary	Speed skating	Men's 1500m
Gold	Patrick Ortlieb	1992 Albertville	Alpine skiing	Men's downhill
Gold	Petra Kronberger	1992 Albertville	Alpine skiing	Women's combined
Gold	Petra Kronberger	1992 Albertville	Alpine skiing	Women's slalom
Gold	Ingo Appelt; Harald Winkler; Gerhard Haidacher; Thomas Schroll	1992 Albertville	Bobsleigh	Four-man
Gold	Doris Neuner	1992 Albertville	Luge	Women's singles
Gold	Ernst Vettori	1992 Albertville	Ski jumping	Men's normal hill
Silver	Anita Wachter	1992 Albertville	Alpine skiing	Women's combined
Silver	Anita Wachter	1992 Albertville	Alpine skiing	Women's giant slalom
Silver	Markus Prock	1992 Albertville	Luge	Men's singles
Silver	Angelika Neuner	1992 Albertville	Luge	Women's singles
Silver	Martin Höllwarth	1992 Albertville	Ski jumping	Men's normal hill
Silver	Martin Höllwarth	1992 Albertville	Ski jumping	Men's large hill
Silver	Heinz Kuttin; Ernst Vettori; Martin Höllwarth; Andreas Felder	1992 Albertville	Ski jumping	Men's team large hill
Bronze	Günther Mader	1992 Albertville	Alpine skiing	Men's downhill
Bronze	Michael Tritscher	1992 Albertville	Alpine skiing	Men's slalom
Bronze	Veronika Stallmaier	1992 Albertville	Alpine skiing	Women's downhill
Bronze	Markus Schmidt	1992 Albertville	Luge	Men's singles
Bronze	Klaus Sulzenbacher	1992 Albertville	Nordic combined	Men's individual
Bronze	Klaus Ofner; Stefan Kreiner; Klaus Sulzenbacher	1992 Albertville	Nordic combined	Men's team
Bronze	Heinz Kuttin	1992 Albertville	Ski jumping	Men's large hill
Bronze	Emese Hunyady	1992 Albertville	Speed skating	Women's 3000m
Gold	Thomas Stangassinger	1994 Lillehammer	Alpine skiing	Men's slalom
Gold	Emese Hunyady	1994 Lillehammer	Speed skating	Women's 1500m
Silver	Elfi Eder	1994 Lillehammer	Alpine skiing	Women's slalom
Silver	Markus Prock	1994 Lillehammer	Luge	Men's singles
Silver	Emese Hunyady	1994 Lillehammer	Speed skating	Women's 3000m
Bronze	Christian Mayer	1994 Lillehammer	Alpine skiing	Men's giant slalom
Bronze	Andrea Tagwerker	1994 Lillehammer	Luge	Women's singles
Bronze	Andreas Goldberger	1994 Lillehammer	Ski jumping	Men's large hill
Bronze	Heinz Kuttin; Christian Moser; Stefan Horngacher; Andreas Goldberger	1994 Lillehammer	Ski jumping	Men's team large hill
Gold	Mario Reiter	1998 Nagano	Alpine skiing	Men's combined
Gold	Hermann Maier	1998 Nagano	Alpine skiing	Men's giant slalom
Gold	Hermann Maier	1998 Nagano	Alpine skiing	Men's super-G
Silver	Stephan Eberharter	1998 Nagano	Alpine skiing	Men's giant slalom
Silver	Hans Knauss	1998 Nagano	Alpine skiing	Men's super-G
Silver	Alexandra Meissnitzer	1998 Nagano	Alpine skiing	Women's giant slalom
Silver	Michaela Dorfmeister	1998 Nagano	Alpine skiing	Women's super-G
Silver	Markus Gandler	1998 Nagano	Cross-country skiing	Men's 10 km pursuit
Bronze	Christian Mayer	1998 Nagano	Alpine skiing	Men's combined
Bronze	Hannes Trinkl	1998 Nagano	Alpine skiing	Men's downhill
Bronze	Thomas Sykora	1998 Nagano	Alpine skiing	Men's slalom
Bronze	Alexandra Meissnitzer	1998 Nagano	Alpine skiing	Women's super-G
Bronze	Christian Hoffmann	1998 Nagano	Cross-country skiing	Men's 50 km freestyle
Bronze	Angelika Neuner	1998 Nagano	Luge	Women's singles
Bronze	Andreas Widhölzl	1998 Nagano	Ski jumping	Men's normal hill
Bronze	Reinhard Schwarzenberger; Martin Höllwarth; Stefan Horngacher; Andreas Widhölzl	1998 Nagano	Ski jumping	Men's team large hill
Bronze	Brigitte Köck	1998 Nagano	Snowboarding	Women's giant slalom
Gold	Fritz Strobl	2002 Salt Lake City	Alpine skiing	Men's downhill
Gold	Stephan Eberharter	2002 Salt Lake City	Alpine skiing	Men's giant slalom
Gold	Christian Hoffmann	2002 Salt Lake City	Cross-country skiing	Men's 30 kilometre freestyle mass start
Silver	Stephan Eberharter	2002 Salt Lake City	Alpine skiing	Men's super-G
Silver	Renate Götschl	2002 Salt Lake City	Alpine skiing	Women's combined
Silver	Mikhail Botvinov	2002 Salt Lake City	Cross-country skiing	Men's 30 kilometre freestyle mass start
Silver	Martin Rettl	2002 Salt Lake City	Skeleton	Men's
Bronze	Benjamin Raich	2002 Salt Lake City	Alpine skiing	Men's combined
Bronze	Stephan Eberharter	2002 Salt Lake City	Alpine skiing	Men's downhill
Bronze	Benjamin Raich	2002 Salt Lake City	Alpine skiing	Men's slalom
Bronze	Andreas Schifferer	2002 Salt Lake City	Alpine skiing	Men's super-G
Bronze	Renate Götschl	2002 Salt Lake City	Alpine skiing	Women's downhill
Bronze	Wolfgang Perner	2002 Salt Lake City	Biathlon	Men's 10 km sprint
Bronze	Markus Prock	2002 Salt Lake City	Luge	Men's singles
Bronze	Felix Gottwald	2002 Salt Lake City	Nordic combined	Men's individual
Bronze	Felix Gottwald	2002 Salt Lake City	Nordic combined	Men's sprint
Bronze	Christoph Bieler; Michael Gruber; Mario Stecher; Felix Gottwald	2002 Salt Lake City	Nordic combined	Men's team
Gold	Benjamin Raich	2006 Turin	Alpine skiing	Men's giant slalom
Gold	Benjamin Raich	2006 Turin	Alpine skiing	Men's slalom
Gold	Michaela Dorfmeister	2006 Turin	Alpine skiing	Women's downhill
Gold	Michaela Dorfmeister	2006 Turin	Alpine skiing	Women's super-G
Gold	Andreas Linger; Wolfgang Linger	2006 Turin	Luge	Doubles
Gold	Felix Gottwald	2006 Turin	Nordic combined	Men's sprint
Gold	Christoph Bieler; Felix Gottwald; Michael Gruber; Mario Stecher	2006 Turin	Nordic combined	Men's team
Gold	Thomas Morgenstern	2006 Turin	Ski jumping	Men's large hill
Gold	Andreas Kofler; Martin Koch; Thomas Morgenstern; Andreas Widhölzl	2006 Turin	Ski jumping	Men's team large hill
Silver	Michael Walchhofer	2006 Turin	Alpine skiing	Men's downhill
Silver	Reinfried Herbst	2006 Turin	Alpine skiing	Men's slalom
Silver	Hermann Maier	2006 Turin	Alpine skiing	Men's super-G
Silver	Marlies Schild	2006 Turin	Alpine skiing	Women's combined
Silver	Nicole Hosp	2006 Turin	Alpine skiing	Women's slalom
Silver	Felix Gottwald	2006 Turin	Nordic combined	Men's individual
Silver	Andreas Kofler	2006 Turin	Ski jumping	Men's large hill
Bronze	Rainer Schönfelder	2006 Turin	Alpine skiing	Men's combined
Bronze	Hermann Maier	2006 Turin	Alpine skiing	Men's giant slalom
Bronze	Rainer Schönfelder	2006 Turin	Alpine skiing	Men's slalom
Bronze	Marlies Schild	2006 Turin	Alpine skiing	Women's slalom
Bronze	Alexandra Meissnitzer	2006 Turin	Alpine skiing	Women's super-G
Bronze	Mikhail Botvinov	2006 Turin	Cross-country skiing	Men's 50 km freestyle
Bronze	Siegfried Grabner	2006 Turin	Snowboarding	Men's parallel giant slalom
Gold	Andrea Fischbacher	2010 Vancouver	Alpine skiing	Women's super-G
Gold	Andreas Linger; Wolfgang Linger	2010 Vancouver	Luge	Doubles
Gold	Bernhard Gruber; David Kreiner; Felix Gottwald; Mario Stecher	2010 Vancouver	Nordic combined	Team large hill/4 x 5 km
Gold	Wolfgang Loitzl; Andreas Kofler; Thomas Morgenstern; Gregor Schlierenzauer	2010 Vancouver	Ski jumping	Team large hill
Silver	Marlies Schild	2010 Vancouver	Alpine skiing	Women's slalom
Silver	Christoph Sumann	2010 Vancouver	Biathlon	Men's pursuit
Silver	Simon Eder; Daniel Mesotitsch; Dominik Landertinger; Christoph Sumann	2010 Vancouver	Biathlon	Men's relay
Silver	Andreas Matt	2010 Vancouver	Freestyle skiing	Men's ski cross
Silver	Nina Reithmayer	2010 Vancouver	Luge	Nina Reithmayer
Silver	Benjamin Karl	2010 Vancouver	Snowboarding	Men's parallel giant slalom
Bronze	Elisabeth Görgl	2010 Vancouver	Alpine skiing	Women's downhill
Bronze	Elisabeth Görgl	2010 Vancouver	Alpine skiing	Women's giant slalom
Bronze	Bernhard Gruber	2010 Vancouver	Nordic combined	Individual large hill/10 km
Bronze	Gregor Schlierenzauer	2010 Vancouver	Ski jumping	Large hill
Bronze	Gregor Schlierenzauer	2010 Vancouver	Ski jumping	Normal hill
Bronze	Marion Kreiner	2010 Vancouver	Snowboarding	Women's parallel giant slalom
Gold	Matthias Mayer	2014 Sochi	Alpine skiing	Men's downhill
Gold	Mario Matt	2014 Sochi	Alpine skiing	Men's slalom
Gold	Anna Fenninger	2014 Sochi	Alpine skiing	Women's super-G
Gold	Julia Dujmovits	2014 Sochi	Snowboarding	Women's parallel slalom
Silver	Marcel Hirscher	2014 Sochi	Alpine skiing	Men's slalom
Silver	Nicole Hosp	2014 Sochi	Alpine skiing	Women's combined
Silver	Anna Fenninger	2014 Sochi	Alpine skiing	Women's giant slalom
Silver	Marlies Schild	2014 Sochi	Alpine skiing	Women's slalom
Silver	Dominik Landertinger	2014 Sochi	Biathlon	Men's sprint
Silver	Andreas Linger; Wolfgang Linger	2014 Sochi	Luge	Doubles
Silver	Thomas Diethart; Michael Hayböck; Thomas Morgenstern; Gregor Schlierenzauer	2014 Sochi	Ski jumping	Team large hill
Silver	Daniela Iraschko-Stolz	2014 Sochi	Ski jumping	Women's normal hill individual
Bronze	Nicole Hosp	2014 Sochi	Alpine skiing	Women's super-G
Bronze	Kathrin Zettel	2014 Sochi	Alpine skiing	Women's slalom
Bronze	Christoph Sumann; Daniel Mesotitsch; Simon Eder; Dominik Landertinger	2014 Sochi	Biathlon	Men's relay
Bronze	Christoph Bieler; Bernhard Gruber; Lukas Klapfer; Mario Stecher	2014 Sochi	Nordic combined	Team large hill/4 x 5 km
Bronze	Benjamin Karl	2014 Sochi	Snowboarding	Men's parallel slalom
Gold	David Gleirscher	2018 Pyeongchang	Luge	Men's singles
Gold	Marcel Hirscher	2018 Pyeongchang	Alpine skiing	Men's combined
Gold	Matthias Mayer	2018 Pyeongchang	Alpine skiing	Men's super–G
Gold	Marcel Hirscher	2018 Pyeongchang	Alpine skiing	Men's giant slalom
Gold	Anna Gasser	2018 Pyeongchang	Snowboarding	Women's big air
Silver	Peter Penz; Georg Fischler	2018 Pyeongchang	Luge	Men's doubles
Silver	Anna Veith	2018 Pyeongchang	Alpine skiing	Women's super–G
Silver	Manuel Feller; Michael Matt; Marco Schwarz; Stephanie Brunner; Katharina Gallhuber; Katharina Liensberger	2018 Pyeongchang	Alpine skiing	Mixed team
Bronze	Lukas Klapfer	2018 Pyeongchang	Nordic combined	Individual normal hill/10 km
Bronze	Dominik Landertinger	2018 Pyeongchang	Biathlon	Men's individual
Bronze	Madeleine Egle; David Gleirscher; Peter Penz; Georg Fischler	2018 Pyeongchang	Luge	Team relay
Bronze	Katharina Gallhuber	2018 Pyeongchang	Alpine skiing	Women's slalom
Bronze	Michael Matt	2018 Pyeongchang	Alpine skiing	Men's slalom
Bronze	Wilhelm Denifl; Bernhard Gruber; Lukas Klapfer; Mario Seidl	2018 Pyeongchang	Nordic combined	Team large hill/4 x 5 km

== Summary by sport ==
=== Aquatics ===
==== Swimming ====
Austria first competed in swimming at the inaugural 1896 Games, with two swimmers competing in the three international events winning a gold and a silver medal. That gold remains (as of the 2016 Games) the only swimming victory for Austria, though the nation has added 5 silvers and 5 bronzes since.

Games	Swimmers	Events	Gold	Silver	Bronze	Total
1896 Athens	2	3/4	1	1	0	2
1900 Paris	4	6/7	0	3	1	4
Total			1	6	5	12

=== Athletics ===
Austria first competed in athletics in 1900, with two athletes winning no medals.

Games	Athletes	Events	Gold	Silver	Bronze	Total
1900 Paris	1	3/23	0	0	0	0
Total			1	2	4	7

=== Cycling ===
Austria first competed in cycling in 1896, with Adolf Schmal winning a gold medal and two bronzes (retroactively, as the award system was different then). Austria didn't win another medal in cycling until 2021, when Anna Kiesenhofer won gold in the women's road race.

Games	Cyclists	Events	Gold	Silver	Bronze	Total
1896 Athens	1	4/6	1	0	2	3
2020 Tokyo	1	8/22	1	0	0	1
Total			2	0	2	4

=== Equestrian ===
Austria had two riders at the first equestrian events in 1900, competing in all five events and winning no medals. Hugo Simon finished fourth in individual jumping twice—24 years apart, in 1972 and 1996.

Games	Riders	Events	Gold	Silver	Bronze	Total
1900 Paris	2	5/5	0	0	0	0
Total			1	1	1	3

=== Fencing ===
Austria had a single sabreur at the 1896 Games, finishing fourth. The nation's first medals in the sport came in 1900, with bronze medals in the men's sabre and men's masters sabre.

Games	Athletes	Events	Gold	Silver	Bronze	Total
1896 Athens	1	1/3	0	0	0	0
1900 Paris	8	3/7	0	0	2	2
Total			1	1	5	7

=== Rowing ===
Games	No. Sailors	Events	Gold	Silver	Bronze	Total	Ranking
1896 Athens	Event wasn't held						
1900 Paris	0	0/5	0	0	0	0	
1904 St Louis	0	0/5	0	0	0	0	
1908 London	0	0/5	0	0	0	0	
1912 Stockholm	6	2/4	0	0	0	0	
1916	Games Cancelled						
1920 Antwerp	0	0/5	0	0	0	0	
1924 Paris	0	0/7	0	0	0	0	
1928 Amsterdam	2	1/7	0	0	1	1	9=
1932 Los Angeles	0	0/7	0	0	0	0	
1936 Berlin	9	4/7	0	1	0	1	6=
1940	Games Cancelled						
1944	Games Cancelled						
1948 London	7	2/7	0	0	0	0	
1952 Helsinki	4	1/7	0	0	0	0	
1956 Melbourne	6	3/7	0	0	1	1	8=
1960 Rome	10	4/7	0	1	0	1	6=
1964 Tokyo	7	2/7	0	0	0	0	
1968 Mexico City	3	2/7	0	0	0	0	
1972 Munich	16	4/7	0	0	0	0	
1976 Montreal	3	2/14	0	0	0	0	
1980	7	3/14	0	0	0	0	
1984 Los Angeles	6	4/14	0	0	0	0	
1988	5	3/14	0	0	0	0	
1992 Barcelona	12	5/14	0	1	0	1	8=
1996 Atlanta	13	6/14	0	0	0	0	
2000 Sydney	8	2/14	0	0	0	0	
2004 Athens	5	2/14	0	0	0	0	
2008 Beijing	0	0/14	0	0	0	0	
2012 London	0	0/14	0	0	0	0	
2016 Rio	3	2/14	0	0	0	0	
2020 Tokyo	3	2/14	0	0	1	1	17=
2024 Paris	3	2/14	0	0	0	0	
Total	138	264	0	3	3	6	36

=== Sailing ===
Games	No. Sailors	Events	Gold	Silver	Bronze	Total	Ranking
1896 Athens	Event Cancelled						
1900 Paris	0	0/13	0	0	0	0	
1916 St Louis	Not Scheduled						
1908 London	0	0/4	0	0	0	0	
1912 Stockholm	0	0/4	0	0	0	0	
1916	Games Cancelled						
1920 Antwerp	0	0/14	0	0	0	0	
1924 Paris	0	0/3	0	0	0	0	
1928 Amsterdam	1	1/3	0	0	0	0	
1932 Los Angeles	0	0/4	0	0	0	0	
1936 Berlin	1	1/4	0	0	0	0	
1940	Games Cancelled						
1944	Games Cancelled						
1948 London	5	2/5	0	0	0	0	
1952 Helsinki	3	2/5	0	0	0	0	
1956 Melbourne	1	1/5	0	0	0	0	
1960 Rome	8	4/5	0	0	0	0	
1964 Tokyo	3	2/5	0	0	0	0	
1968 Mexico City	3	2/5	0	1	0	1	5
1972 Munich	12	5/6	0	0	0	0	
1976 Montreal	9	4/6	0	0	0	0	
1980 Moscow	5	3/6	0	2	0	2	6
1984 Los Angeles	10	5/7	0	0	0	0	
1988 Seoul	8	5/8	0	0	0	0	
1992 Barcelona	13	7/10	0	0	0	0	
1996 Atlanta	6	4/10	0	0	0	0	
2000 Sydney	5	4/11	2	0	0	2	3
2004 Athens	7	4/11	1	1	0	2	4=
2008 Qingdoa	11	6/11	0	0	0	0	
2012 Weymouth	8	5/10	0	0	0	0	
2016 Rio	8	4/10	0	0	1	1	13=
2020 Tokyo	6	3/10	0	0	0	0	
Total		205	3	4	1	8	15

== See also ==
- List of flag bearers for Austria at the Olympics
- Category:Olympic competitors for Austria
- Austria at the Paralympics
