= Peter Kirby =

Peter Kirby may refer to:

- Peter Kirby (bobsleigh) (born 1931), Canadian bobsledder
- Peter Kirby (athlete) (born 1964/1965), Australian Paralympic athlete
- Peter Kirby (pewtersmith), American pewtersmith
