= Alexandru Oancea =

Alexandru Oancea may refer to:

- Alexandru Oancea (bobsleigh) (born 1937), Romanian bobsledder
- Alexandru Oancea (rugby union) (born 1993), Romanian rugby union player
