= FIBT World Championships 1962 =

Winter sport competition

1962 World Championships
- Location: Garmisch-Partenkirchen, West Germany

The FIBT World Championships 1962 took place in Garmisch-Partenkirchen, West Germany for the fifth time after hosting the event previously in 1934 (Four-man), 1938 (Four-man), 1953, and 1958.

== Two man bobsleigh ==
Pos	Team	Time
Gold	Italy (Rinaldo Ruatti, Enrico de Lorenzo)	
Silver	Italy (Sergio Zardini, Romano Bonagura)	
Bronze	West Germany (Hans Maurer, Adolf Wörmann)	

Eugenio Monti's five straight championship victories ended when he did not qualify for the team leading to the event at Garmisch-Partenkirchen.

== Four man bobsleigh ==
Pos	Team	Time
Gold	West Germany (Franz Schelle, Josef Sterff, Ludwig Siebert, Otto Göbl)	
Silver	Italy (Sergio Zardini, Ferruccio Dalla Torre, Enrico de Lorenzo, Romano Bonagura)	
Bronze	Austria (Franz Isser, Pepi Isser, Heini Isser, Fritz Isser)	

== Medal table ==
Rank	Nation	Gold	Silver	Bronze	Total
1	Italy (ITA)	1	2	0	3
2	West Germany (FRG)	1	0	1	2
3	Austria (AUT)	0	0	1	1
Totals (3 entries)		2	2	2	6
