= Bonagura =

Bonagura is a surname. Notable people with the surname include:

- Alyssa Bonagura (born 1988), American singer-songwriter
- Gianni Bonagura (1925–2017), Italian actor and voice actor
- Romano Bonagura (1930–2010), Italian bobsledder
