= FIBT World Championships 1963 =

Winter sport competition

1963 World Championships
- Location: Igls, Austria

The FIBT World Championships 1963 took place in Igls, Austria for the second time after hosting the event previously in 1935 (Two-man). This event would serve as the test for the Winter Olympics that would take place the following year in neighboring Innsbruck.

== Two man bobsleigh ==
Pos	Team	Time
Gold	Italy (Eugenio Monti, Sergio Siorpaes)	
Silver	Italy (Sergio Zardini, Romano Bonagura)	
Bronze	United Kingdom (Anthony Nash, Robin Dixon)	

== Four man bobsleigh ==
Pos	Team	Time
Gold	Italy (Sergio Zardini, Ferruccio Dalla Torre, Renato Mocellini, Romano Bonagura)	
Silver	Italy (Angelo Frigerio, Mario Pallua, Luigi de Bettin, Sergio Mocellini)	
Bronze	Austria (Erwin Thaler, Reinhold Dumthaler, Josef Nairz, Adolf Koxeder)	

== Medal table ==
Rank	Nation	Gold	Silver	Bronze	Total
1	Italy (ITA)	2	2	0	4
2	Austria (AUT)	0	0	1	1
2	Great Britain (GBR)	0	0	1	1
Totals (3 entries)		2	2	2	6
