= Janc =

Janc is a surname. Notable people with the surname include:

- Andreas Janc (1938–2018), Austrian cross-country skier
- Blaž Janc (born 1996), Slovene handball player
- Mitja Janc (born 2003), Slovene handball player
