= Wackerle =

Wackerle is a surname. Notable people with the surname include:

- Anton Wackerle (born 1938), German bobsledder
- Hilmar Wäckerle (1899-1941), German concentration camp commandant and Waffen-SS officer
- Joseph Wackerle (1880–1959), German sculptor
- Sylvester Wackerle (1908–1978), German bobsledder
- Sylvester Wackerle (ice hockey) (born 1937), German ice hockey player
