= Eugenio Monti =

Italian bobsledder (1828–2003)

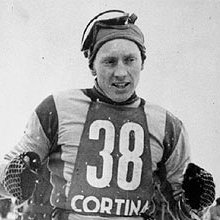
- Monti in the 1950s

Personal information
- Born: 23 January 1928 Toblach, Italy
- Died: 1 December 2003 (aged 75) Belluno, Italy

Sport
- Country: Italy
- Sport: Bobsleigh
Medal record
| Event | 1st | 2nd | 3rd |
|---|---|---|---|
| Olympic Games | 2 | 2 | 2 |
| World Championships | 9 | 1 | 0 |
| Total | 11 | 3 | 2 |
Olympic Games
| Gold medal – first place | 1968 Grenoble | Two-man |
| Gold medal – first place | 1968 Grenoble | Four-man |
| Silver medal – second place | 1956 Cortina d'Ampezzo | Two-man |
| Silver medal – second place | 1956 Cortina d'Ampezzo | Four-man |
| Bronze medal – third place | 1964 Innsbruck | Two-man |
| Bronze medal – third place | 1964 Innsbruck | Four-man |
World Championships
| Gold medal – first place | 1957 St. Moritz | Two-man |
| Gold medal – first place | 1958 Garmisch | Two-man |
| Gold medal – first place | 1959 St. Moritz | Two-man |
| Gold medal – first place | 1960 Cortina d'Ampezzo | Two-man |
| Gold medal – first place | 1960 Cortina d'Ampezzo | Four-man |
| Gold medal – first place | 1961 Lake Placid | Two-man |
| Gold medal – first place | 1961 Lake Placid | Four-man |
| Gold medal – first place | 1963 Igls | Two-man |
| Gold medal – first place | 1966 Cortina d'Ampezzo | Two-man |
| Silver medal – second place | 1957 St. Moritz | Four-man |

Eugenio Monti (23 January 1928 – 1 December 2003) was an Italian bobsleigher and alpine skier. He is one of the most successful athletes in the history of the bobsleigh, with ten World championship medals (of which nine gold) and 6 Olympic medals including two golds. He is known also for his acts of sportsmanship during the 1964 Winter Olympics in Innsbruck, Austria, which made him the first athlete ever to receive the Pierre de Coubertin World Trophy.

== Biography ==
Born in Toblach, Italy, The Flying Redhead was the best Italian young skier: he won the national titles in slalom and giant slalom, and finished third in downhill, but a 1951 accident stopped his alpine skiing career when he tore ligaments in both of his knees. Monti switched to bobsleigh, finding great success as a result. In 1954 he won his first Italian championship and in 1957 won his first world championship.

At the 1956 Winter Olympics in Cortina d'Ampezzo, he won silver medals in the 2-man and 4-man bobsled events. He could not compete in the 1960 Winter Olympics in Squaw Valley, California, because the bobsleigh race was not held for economic reasons (for the only time in the history of the Winter Olympic Games).

But it was during the 1964 Winter Olympics in Innsbruck that Monti performed the best-known act of his sporting career. Realizing that British bobsleighers Tony Nash and Robin Dixon had broken a bolt on their sledge, Monti lent them the bolt from his sledge. The Britons won the gold medal in the 2-man bobsled, while Monti and his teammate took the bronze medal. Answering critics from the home press, Monti told them, "Nash didn't win because I gave him the bolt. He won because he had the fastest run." Monti also showed his act of selfless generosity in the four-man competition. There, the Canadian team of Vic Emery had damaged their sledge's axle and would have been disqualified had not Monti and his mechanics come to the rescue. The sledge was repaired, and the Canadian team went on to win the gold medal, while Monti's team took bronze. For these acts of sportsmanship, he was awarded the Pierre de Coubertin World Trophy.

Finally, at the 1968 Winter Olympics in Grenoble, France, a 40-year-old Monti won a gold in both the two-man and four-man events (the first non-German to do so). After his victory, he received Italy's highest civilian honour – the Commendatore of the Italian Republic and then retired to labour in his skiing facilities in Cortina.

Struck by numerous hardships (separation from his wife, the departure of his daughter for the United States, the death of his son from an overdose), suffering from Parkinson's disease, on 30 November 2003, he shot himself in the head; transported to the hospital in Belluno, he died the next day.

Turn 19 at Cesana Pariol, the site of the 2006 Winter Olympic bobsled, luge, and skeleton competitions, was named for Monti. The bobsleigh track that Monti competed on for years in Cortina and is slated for the 2026 Winter Olympics was renamed in his honour following his 2003 death.

== Achievements ==
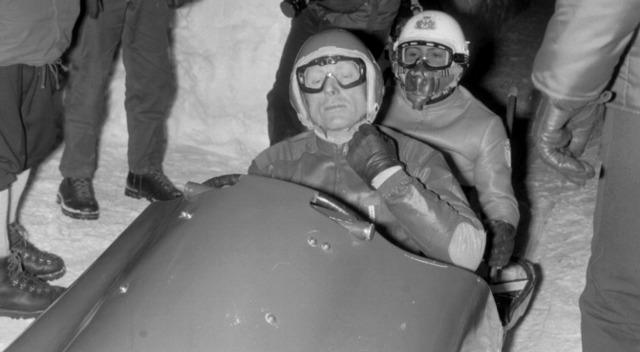
Eugenio Monti, in the driver's seat of his bob, in 1960s

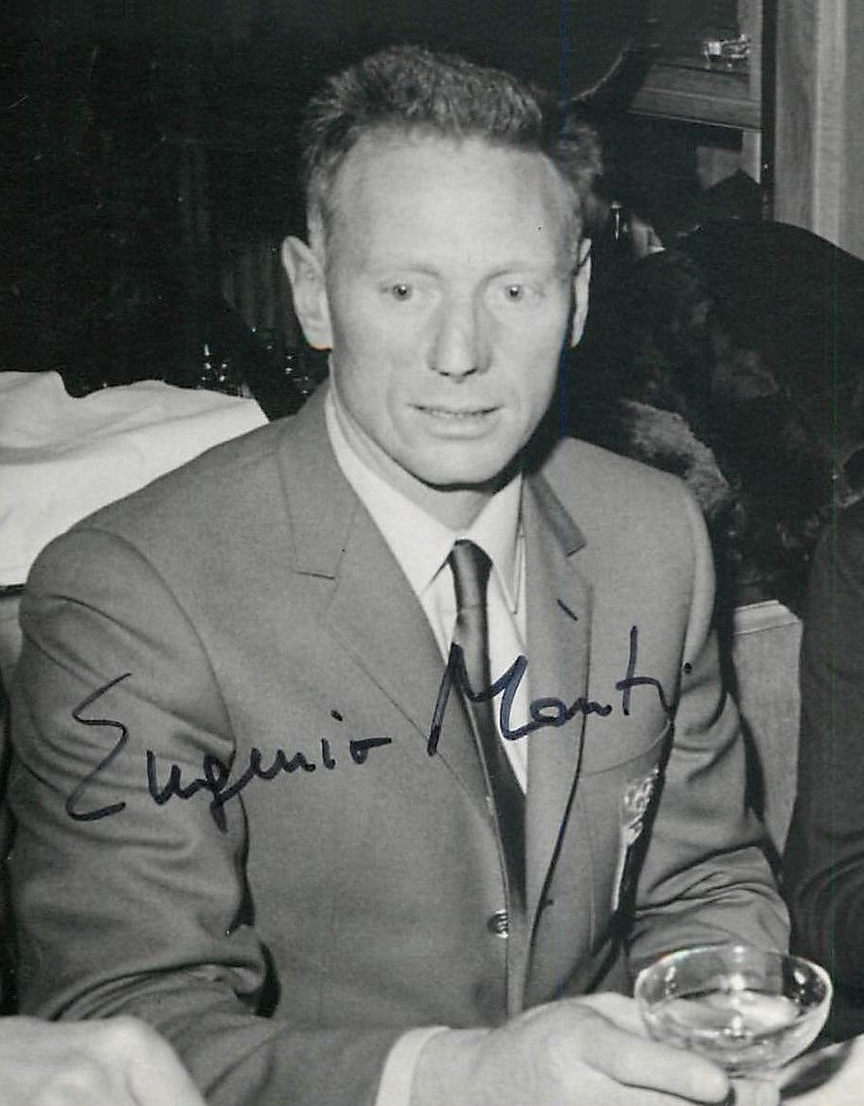
Eugenio Monti, at a Gala evening, in 1960s

=== Bobsleigh ===
==== Olympic Games ====
- Gold medal in the two-man at the 1968 Winter Olympics
- Gold medal in the four-man at the 1968 Winter Olympics
- Silver medal in the two-man at the 1956 Winter Olympics
- Silver medal in the four-man at the 1956 Winter Olympics
- Bronze medal in the two-man at the 1964 Winter Olympics
- Bronze medal in the four-man at the 1964 Winter Olympics

==== World Championships ====
- Gold medal in the two-man in 1957, 1958, 1959, 1960, 1961, 1963, 1966
- Gold medal in the four-man in 1960, 1961
- Silver medal in the four-man in 1957

=== Alpine skiing ===
==== National titles ====
Monti has won three national titles.

- Italian Alpine Ski Championships
  - Slalom: 1949, 1950 (2)
  - Giant slalom: 1950 (1)

== See also ==
- Legends of Italian sport – Walk of Fame
- Italy at the Olympics – Men gold medalist

Summer Olympics
| Preceded by Bruno Alberti | Flag bearer for Italy; 1964 Innsbruck | Succeeded by Clotilde Fasolis |
