= Dundon =

Dundon is a surname. Notable people with the surname include:

- Bill Dundon (born 1934), American bobsledder
- Ed Dundon (1859–1893), American baseball player
- Gus Dundon (1874–1940), American baseball player
- Kevin Dundon, Irish chef
- Michael Dundon (1854–1936), Maltese politician
- Thomas Dundon (born 1972), American businessman

== See also ==
- Dundon, Somerset, a village in Compton Dundon parish, England
  - Compton Dundon, a village and civil parish in Somerset
