= Kleinpeter =

Kleinpeter is the surname of the following notable people:

- Caleb Kleinpeter, American politician
- Hans Kleinpeter (1936–2004), Swiss bobsledder
