= FIBT World Championships 1966 =

Winter sport competition

1966 World Championships
- Location: Cortina d'Ampezzo, Italy

The FIBT World Championships 1966 took place in Cortina d'Ampezzo, Italy for the sixth time, having hosted the event previously in 1937 (Two-man), 1939 (Four-man), 1950, 1954, and 1960. The Four-man event was cancelled following the death of West Germany's Toni Pensperger during competition. Pensperger would be awarded a posthumous gold medal from the FIBT along with his surviving teammates Ludwig Siebert, Helmut Werzer, and Roland Ebert. As of 2010, Pensperger's death would set the FIBT to increase and improve safety among all bobsleigh competitions at all levels, including the Winter Olympics and the World championships.

== Two man bobsleigh ==
| Pos | Team | Time |
|---|---|---|
| Gold | Italy (Eugenio Monti, Sergio Siorpaes) | |
| Silver | Italy (Gianfranco Gaspari, Leonardo Cavallini) | |
| Bronze | United Kingdom (Anthony Nash, Robin Dixon) | |

== Four man bobsleigh ==
This event was cancelled when Toni Pensperger of West Germany was killed during competition. Pensperger was awarded a posthumous gold medal along with his grieving teammates (Siebert, Werzer, and Ebert).

== Medal table ==
| Rank | Nation | Gold | Silver | Bronze | Total |
|---|---|---|---|---|---|
| 1 | Italy (ITA) | 1 | 1 | 0 | 2 |
| 2 | West Germany (FRG) | 1 | 0 | 0 | 1 |
| 3 | Great Britain (GBR) | 0 | 0 | 1 | 1 |
| Totals (3 entries) | | 2 | 1 | 1 | 4 |
