= Charlie McDonald (bobsleigh) =

American bobsledder

Personal information
- Born: September 25, 1932 Malone, New York, United States
- Died: March 15, 1984 (aged 51) Albany, New York, United States

Sport
- Sport: Bobsleigh

Charlie McDonald (September 25, 1932 – March 15, 1984) was an American bobsledder. He competed in the two-man event at the 1964 Winter Olympics.
