= Heino Freyberg =

Swedish bobsledder

Personal information
- Nationality: Swedish
- Born: 31 October 1922; Tallinn, Estonia
- Died: 26 January 1978 (aged 55); Stockholm, Sweden

Sport
- Sport: Bobsleigh

Heino Freyberg (31 October 1922 – 26 January 1978) was a Swedish bobsledder. He competed in the two-man and the four-man events at the 1964 Winter Olympics.
