= Italo de Lorenzo =

Italian bobsledder (1939–2025)

Medal record

Bobsleigh

World Championships
Silver medal – second place	1965 St. Moritz	Four-man

Italo de Lorenzo (19 April 1939 – 2 January 2025) was an Italian bobsleigher who competed in the mid-1960s. He won a silver medal in the four-man event at the 1965 FIBT World Championships in St. Moritz.

== Biography ==
Brother of Enrico de Lorenzo, Italo was a member of Italy's national bobsleigh team from 1959 to 1967, winning silver in the four-man World Championships in 1965.

He was a bobsleigh commentator for Dutch television and radio from 1968 to 1982, and in 1978, he helped establish the Dutch bobsleigh and skeleton federation (Bob en Slee Bond Nederland / BSBN).

De Lorenzo was a member of the executive committee of the BSBN and their team manager. He was also named as honorary president of the BSBN, honorary member of the ISBF, and was bestowed the Cavaliere Ordine al Merito della Repubblica Italiana in 2003 and the Order of Orange-Nassau in 2011.

Between 1971 and 2002, De Lorenzo and his wife, Mia, operated an ice cream parlor on the Oudegracht canal in Utrecht.

== Personal life ==
Italo de Lorenzo lived in Utrecht and Pieve di Cadore.

De Lorenzo died on 2 January 2025, at the age of 85.

== Sources ==
- Bobsleigh four-man world championship medalists since 1930
- BSBN profile featuring de Lorenzo (in Dutch)
