= Jan-Erik Åkerström =

Swedish bobsledder (1935–2024)

Personal information
- Nationality: Swedish
- Born: 10 October 1935; Stockholm, Sweden
- Died: 14 August 2024 (aged 88)

Sport
- Sport: Bobsleigh

Jan-Erik Åkerström (10 October 1935 – 14 August 2024) was a Swedish bobsledder. He competed in the two-man event at the 1964 Winter Olympics.

He died on 14 August 2024, at the age of 88.
