= Fritz Isser =

Austrian bobsledder

Medal record

Bobsleigh

World Championships
Bronze medal – third place	1962 Garmisch-Partenkirchen	Four-man

Fritz Isser was an Austrian bobsledder who competed during the 1960s. Along with Pepi Isser, Heini Isser, and Franz Isser, he won the bronze medal in the four-man event at the 1962 FIBT World Championships in Garmisch-Partenkirchen.
