= Hansruedi Beugger =

Swiss bobsledder (1930–2020)

Personal information
- Nationality: Swiss
- Born: 15 July 1930
- Died: 30 March 2020 (aged 89)

Sport
- Sport: Bobsleigh

Hansruedi Beugger (15 July 1930 – 30 March 2020) was a Swiss bobsledder. He competed in the four-man event at the 1964 Winter Olympics.
