= Fernando Rodríguez (bobsleigh) =

Argentine bobsledder (born 1931)

Personal information
- Full name: Fernando Isidoro Rodríguez Jurado
- Born: 25 February 1931; Buenos Aires, Argentina

Sport
- Sport: Bobsleigh

Fernando Rodríguez (born 25 February 1931) is an Argentine former bobsledder. He competed in the two-man and the four-man events at the 1964 Winter Olympics.

His uncle is Arturo Rodríguez.
