= Franz Wörmann =

German bobsledder

Personal information
- Nationality: German
- Born: 31 August 1939 (age 86) Garmisch-Partenkirchen, Germany

Sport
- Sport: Bobsleigh
Medal record
Men's bobsleigh
Representing West Germany
European Championships
Bronze medal – third place	1967 Igls	Four-man

Franz Wörmann (born 31 August 1939) is a German bobsledder. He competed in the two-man and the four-man events at the 1964 Winter Olympics.
