= Herbert Kiesel =

Swiss bobsledder (1931–2015)

Personal information
- Nationality: Swiss
- Born: 10 December 1931; Zürich, Switzerland
- Died: 14 December 2015 (aged 84)

Sport
- Sport: Bobsleigh

Herbert Kiesel (10 December 1931 – 14 December 2015) was a Swiss bobsledder. He competed in the two-man and the four-man events at the 1964 Winter Olympics.
