= Kjell Lutteman =

Swedish bobsledder

Personal information
- Nationality: Swedish
- Born: 1 May 1937 (age 87); Stockholm, Sweden

Sport
- Sport: Bobsleigh

Kjell Lutteman (born 1 May 1937) is a Swedish bobsledder. He competed in the two-man and four-man events at the 1964 Winter Olympics.
