= Roland Ebert =

West German bobsledder

Medal record

Bobsleigh

World Championships
Gold medal – first place	1966 Cortina d'Ampezzo	Four-man

Roland Ebert was a West German bobsledder who competed during the 1960s. He won a gold medal in the four-man event at the 1966 FIBT World Championships after his teammate Toni Pensperger was killed during the four-man event. Pensperger was posthumously awarded the gold medal while Ebert and his surviving teammates, Ludwig Siebert and Helmut Werzer, received their golds as well.
