= Toni Pensperger =

German bobsledder

Medal record

Bobsleigh

World Championships
Gold medal – first place	1966 Cortina d'Ampezzo	Four-man

Anton "Toni" Pensperger (died 5 February 1966) was a West German bobsledder who competed during the 1960s. He was posthumously awarded a gold medal in the four-man event after he was killed at age 26 during the event at the 1966 FIBT World Championships in Cortina d'Ampezzo. His surviving teammates Ludwig Siebert, Helmut Werzer, and Roland Ebert received their golds as well.

A street in Garmisch-Partenkirchen, Toni Pensperger Strasse, is named in Pensperger's honor.
