= Camille Liénard =

Belgian bobsledder (1934–2021)

Personal information
- Nationality: Belgian
- Born: 27 July 1934; Schaerbeek, Belgium
- Died: 24 March 2021 (aged 86)

Sport
- Sport: Bobsleigh

Camille Liénard (27 July 1934 – 24 March 2021) was a Belgian bobsledder. He competed in the four-man event at the 1964 Winter Olympics.
