= Bob Rogers (bobsleigh) =

American bobsledder

Personal information
- Born: January 15, 1923 Saranac Lake, New York, United States
- Died: December 14, 1995 (aged 72) Saranac Lake, New York, United States

Sport
- Sport: Bobsleigh

Bob Rogers (January 15, 1923 – December 14, 1995) was an American bobsledder. He competed in the four-man event at the 1964 Winter Olympics.
