= Reg Benham =

American bobsledder

Personal information
- Nationality: American
- Born: February 8, 1941 (age 85) Lake Placid, New York, United States

Sport
- Sport: Bobsleigh

Reg Benham (born February 8, 1941) is an American bobsledder. He competed in the four-man event at the 1964 Winter Olympics.
