= Gordon Currie (bobsleigh) =

Canadian bobsledder

Personal information
- Born: 18 October 1933 (age 93) Montreal, Quebec, Canada

Sport
- Sport: Bobsleigh

Gordon Selkirk Currie (born 18 October 1933) is a Canadian bobsledder. He competed in the two-man and the four-man events at the 1964 Winter Olympics.
