= Leonardo Cavallini =

Italian bobsledder (1939–2023)

Medal record

Bobsleigh

World Championships
Silver medal – second place	1966 Cortina d'Ampezzo	Two-man

Leonardo Cavallini (4 June 1939 – 11 July 2023) was an Italian bobsledder who competed in the late 1960s. He won a silver medal in the two-man event at the 1966 FIBT World Championships in Cortina d'Ampezzo. Cavallini also finished sixth in the four-man event at the 1968 Winter Olympics in Grenoble.
