= Hubert Braun =

German bobsledder

Personal information
- Nationality: German
- Born: 5 November 1939 Garmisch-Partenkirchen, Germany
- Died: 19 February 2012 (aged 72) Garmisch-Partenkirchen, Germany

Sport
- Sport: Bobsleigh
Medal record
Men's bobsleigh
Representing West Germany
European Championships
Bronze medal – third place	1967 Igls	Four-man

Hubert Braun (5 November 1939 – 19 February 2012) was a German bobsledder. He competed in the two-man and the four-man events at the 1964 Winter Olympics.
