= Hernán Agote =

Argentine bobsledder (1937–2017)

Personal information
- Born: 21 July 1937; Buenos Aires, Argentina
- Died: 16 October 2017 (aged 80); Buenos Aires, Argentina

Sport
- Sport: Bobsleigh

Hernán Agote (21 July 1937 – 16 October 2017) was an Argentine bobsledder. He competed in the two-man and the four-man events at the 1964 Winter Olympics.
