= Enrico de Lorenzo =

Italian bobsledder (1933–2021)

Medal record

Bobsleigh

World Championships
Gold medal – first place	1962 Garmisch-Partenkirchen	Two-man
Silver medal – second place	1962 Garmisch-Partenkirchen	Four-man
Silver medal – second place	1965 St. Moritz	Two-man

Enrico De Lorenzo (16 January 1933 – 14 October 2021) was an Italian bobsleigher who competed during the 1960s. Brother of Italo de Lorenzo, he won three medals at the FIBT World Championships with a gold (Two-man: 1962) and two silvers (Two-man: 1965, Four-man: 1962).
