= Hariton Pașovschi =

Romanian bobsledder

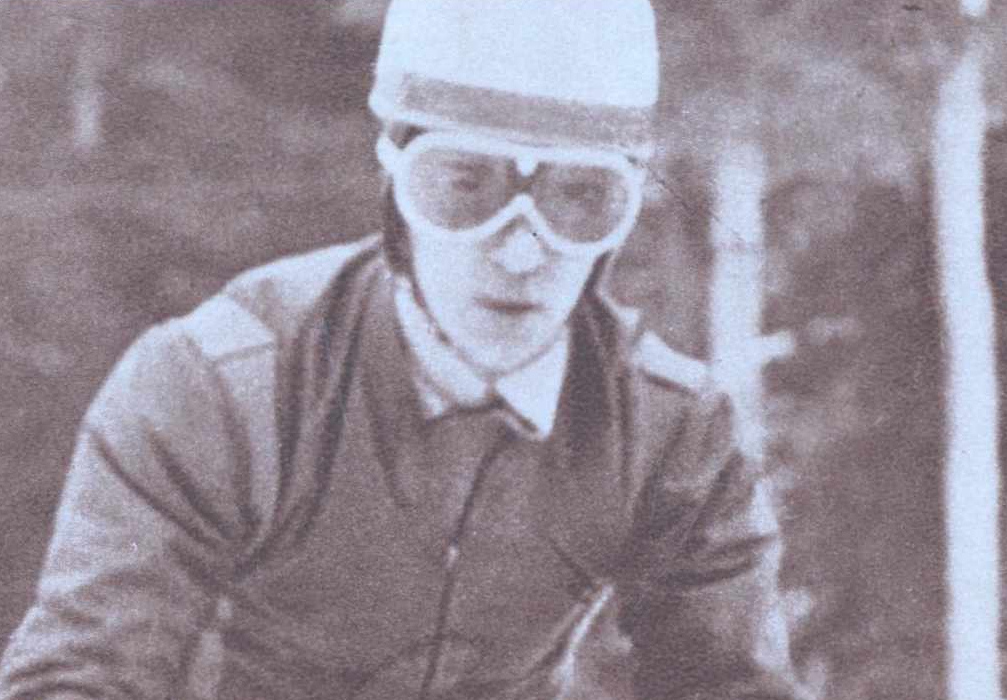
- Pașovschi in 1963

Personal information
- Nationality: Romanian
- Born: 6 April 1935 Craiova, Romania
- Died: 2009 (aged 73–74)

Sport
- Sport: Bobsleigh

Hariton Pașovschi (6 April 1935 – 2009) was a Romanian bobsledder. He competed in the two-man and the four-man events at the 1964 Winter Olympics.
