= Rinaldo Ruatti =

Italian bobsledder (1930–2020)

Medal record

Bobsleigh

World Championships
Gold medal – first place	1962 Garmisch-Partenkirchen	Two-man
Silver medal – second place	1965 St. Moritz	Two-man

Rinaldo Ruatti (19 January 1930 – 30 September 2020) was an Italian bobsledder who competed in the early 1960s. He won two medals in the two-man event at the FIBT World Championships with a gold in 1962 and a silver in 1965. He also competed at the 1968 Winter Olympics.
