= Constantin Cotacu =

Romanian bobsledder

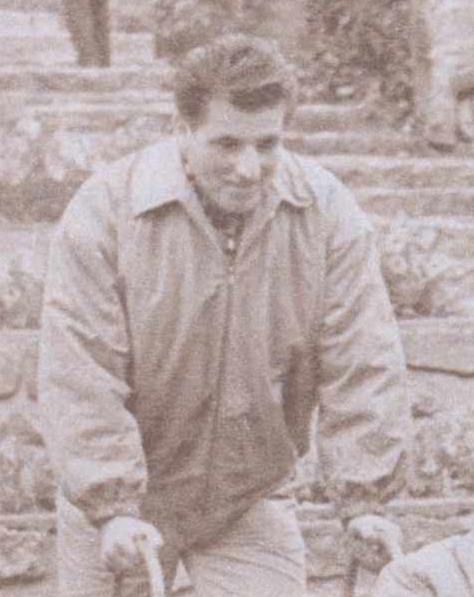
- Cotacu in 1965

Personal information
- Nationality: Romanian
- Born: 11 October 1937 (age 88) Sinaia, Romania

Sport
- Sport: Bobsleigh

Constantin Cotacu (born 11 October 1937) is a Romanian bobsledder. He competed in the two-man and the four-man events at the 1964 Winter Olympics.
