= Rupert Grasegger =

German bobsledder

Personal information
- Nationality: German
- Born: 12 February 1939 (age 86); Garmisch-Partenkirchen, Germany

Sport
- Sport: Bobsleigh

Rupert Grasegger (born 12 February 1939) is a German bobsledder. He competed in the two-man and the four-man events at the 1964 Winter Olympics.
