= Jean de Crawhez =

Belgian bobsledder (born 1934)

Personal information
- Nationality: Belgian
- Born: 2 May 1934 (age 91) Namur, Belgium

Sport
- Sport: Bobsleigh

Jean de Crawhez (born 2 May 1934) is a Belgian bobsledder. He competed in the four-man event at the 1964 Winter Olympics.
