= William Kirby (pewtersmith) =

18th-century American pewtersmith

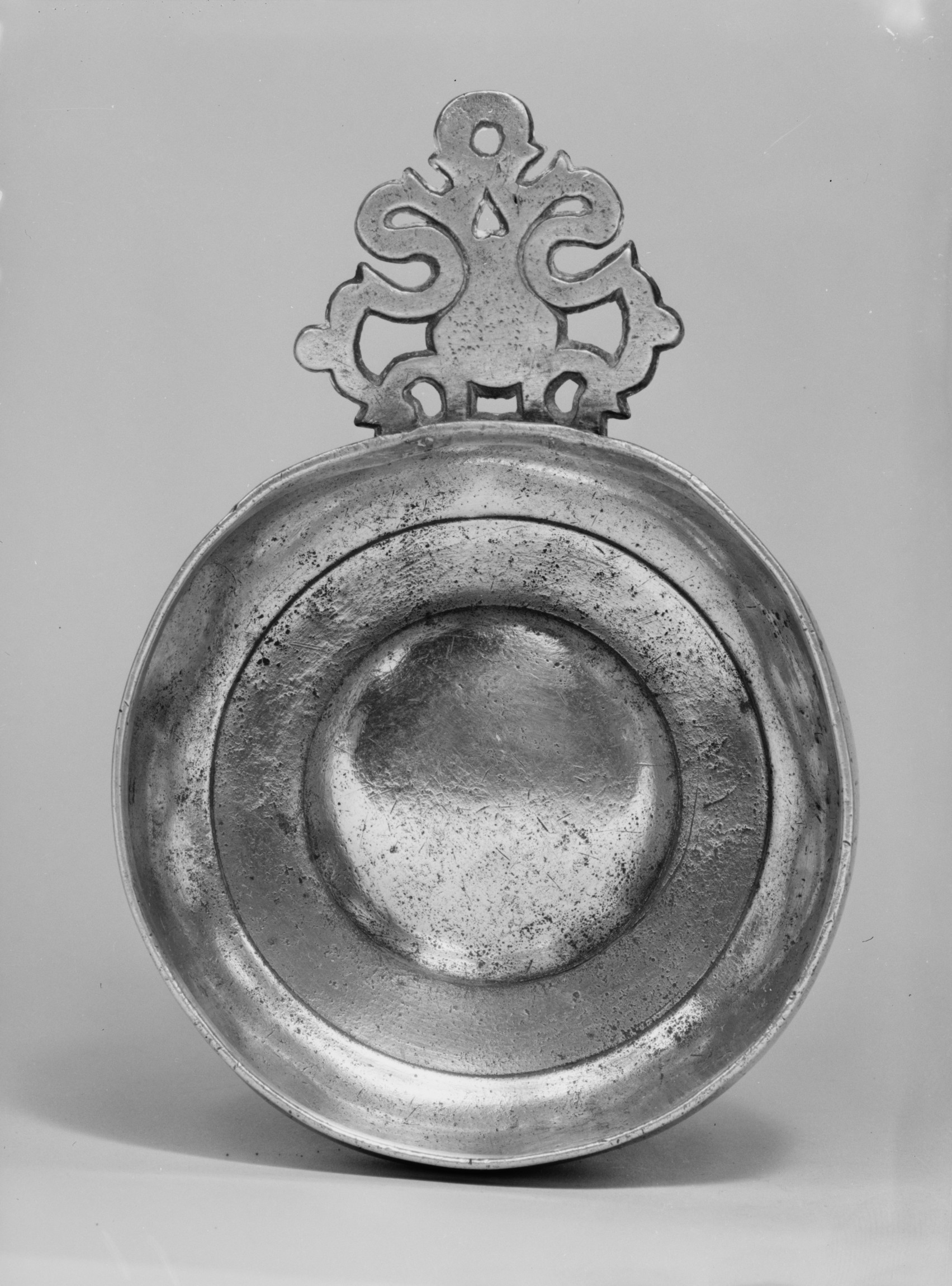
Porringer by William Kirby

William Kirby (c. 1738 – after 1810) was an American pewtersmith active in New York City.

Kirby's father was Peter Kirby, also a pewtersmith. He married Catherine Roosevelt on February 6, 1760, in New York City, where he worked from circa 1755–1790 as a pewtersmith. The 1786 city directory gives his address as 23 Dock Street, and he advertised on September 26, 1774, as follows in the New-York Gazette and The Weekly Mercury:

William Kirby, Pewterer, at the corner of Dock-street, near the Old Slip Market, and opposite the late corner-store of Gerardus Duyckinck, has just imported in the Earl of Dunmore, Capt. Lawrence, a large and general assortment of London pewter, which he will sell wholesale and retail, on the most reasonable terms, viz. Dishes, plates and basons; hard-metal water plates, tureens, tankards, quart and pint pots, teapots of different sorts and sizes; coffee, sugar, and milk pots; pint, 1/2 pint and gill porringers; soup, table and teaspoons; round-bowl spoons, soup ladles, quart and pint bowls, wash-hand basons, funnels, large chamber pots, close-stool and bed pans, measures from one gallon to half a gill, dram cups, round and square chest ink-stands, large and small crains.

Said Kirby has likewise just come to hand, a curious and general assortment of English and Dutch toys, which he will sell wholesale and retail, at a low advance, amongst which are, a few large humming tops, japan'd waiters, bread baskets, clothes and shoe brushes, hair brooms, hearth brushes, plated shoe and knee buckles, and a variety of other articles in the toy way, too tedious to mention.

He takes old pewter and bees-wax in exchange for new pewter.

His work is collected in the Metropolitan Museum of Art, Winterthur Museum, Garden and Library, and Yale University Art Gallery.
