= Adolf Wörmann =

German bobsledder

Medal record

Men's Bobsleigh

Representing West Germany

World Championships
Bronze medal – third place	1962 Garmisch-Partenkirchen	Two-man

Adolf Wörmann was a West German bobsledder who competed during the early 1960s. He won a bronze medal in the two-man event at the 1962 FIBT World Championships in Garmisch-Partenkirchen.
