= Bernhard Wild =

Swiss bobsledder (born 1931)

Personal information
- Nationality: Swiss
- Born: 25 May 1931; Zürich, Switzerland

Sport
- Sport: Bobsleigh

Bernhard Wild (born 25 May 1931) is a Swiss bobsledder. He competed in the four-man event at the 1964 Winter Olympics.
