= David Lewis (bobsleigh) =

British bobsledder

Personal information
- Nationality: British
- Born: 3 September 1936 (age 88); Exeter, England

Sport
- Sport: Bobsleigh

David Lewis (born 3 September 1936) is a British bobsledder. He competed in the four-man event at the 1964 Winter Olympics.
