= Angelo Frigerio =

Italian bobsledder

Medal record

Men's bobsleigh

Representing Italy

World Championships
Silver medal – second place	1963 Igls	Four-man

European Championships
Bronze medal – third place	1965 Cortina d'Ampezzo	Two-man

Angelo Frigerio was an Italian bobsledder who competed during the 1960s. He won the silver medal in the four-man event at the 1963 FIBT World Championships in Igls.

Frigerio later became a bobsleigh coach.
