= Thierry De Borchgrave =

Belgian bobsledder (1932–2009)

Personal information
- Full name: Thierry De Borchgrave D'Altena
- Nationality: Belgian
- Born: 21 May 1932 Brussels, Belgium
- Died: 15 August 2009 (aged 77) Brussels, Belgium

Sport
- Sport: Bobsleigh

Thierry De Borchgrave D'Altena (21 May 1932 – 15 August 2009) was a Belgian bobsledder. He competed in the four-man event at the 1964 Winter Olympics. De Borchgrave died in Brussels on 15 August 2009, at the age of 77.
