= Monty Gordon =

Canadian bobsledder (1932–2019)

Personal information
- Born: 29 April 1932; Harriston, Ontario, Canada
- Died: 26 July 2019 (aged 87); Toronto, Ontario, Canada

Sport
- Sport: Bobsleigh

Lloyd Lamont "Monty" Gordon (29 April 1932 – 26 July 2019) was a Canadian bobsledder and businessman. He competed in the four-man event at the 1964 Winter Olympics.
