= Helmut Werzer =

German bobsledder

Medal record

Bobsleigh

World Championships
Gold medal – first place	1966 Cortina d'Ampezzo	Four-man

Helmut Werzer was a West German bobsledder who competed in the sport during the 1960s.

== Biography ==
He won a gold medal in the four-man event at the 1966 FIBT World Championships after his teammate Toni Pensperger was killed during the event. Pensperger would be posthumously awarded the gold medal, which Werzer and his surviving teammates, Ludwig Siebert and Roland Ebert, received.
