= Mike Baumgartner (bobsleigh) =

American bobsledder

Personal information
- Nationality: American
- Born: April 20, 1922 Perth Amboy, New Jersey, United States
- Died: July 22, 1991 (aged 69) Hollywood, Florida, United States

Sport
- Sport: Bobsleigh

Mike Baumgartner (April 20, 1922 – July 22, 1991) was an American bobsledder. He competed in the four-man event at the 1964 Winter Olympics.
