= Doug Anakin =

Canadian bobsledder (1930–2020)

Medal record

Bobsleigh

Representing Canada

Olympic Games
Gold medal – first place	1964 Innsbruck	Four-man

Douglas Thomas Anakin (November 6, 1930 – April 25, 2020) was a Canadian bobsleigh competitor. He was born in Chatham, Ontario and was selected by Vic Emery as a member of Canada's gold medal-winning four-man bobsleigh team at the 1964 Winter Olympics. Anakin was also one of the driving forces behind the Canadian luge program. He was inducted into Canada's Sports Hall of Fame and the Canadian Olympic Hall of Fame.

Anakin taught for 19 years at John Abbott College in Sainte-Anne-de-Bellevue before retiring in 1990. Because of his involvement at the school, his commitment to his community, and his passion for outdoor activities, the school established the "Doug Anakin Scholarship for Outdoor Pursuits" which is presented annually to a student who best demonstrates Anakin's traits.

Anakin owned Doug Anakin Sports in Beaconsfield, a store specializing in outdoor sport equipment.

Anakin was married and had two children and four grandchildren. He died in Invermere, British Columbia in 2020 at the age of 89.
