= Luigi de Bettin =

Italian bobsledder

Medal record

Bobsleigh

World Championships
Silver medal – second place	1963 Igls	Four-man

Luigi de Bettin was an Italian bobsledder who competed during the 1960s. He won the silver medal in the four-man event at the 1963 FIBT World Championships in Igls.
