= Oskar Lory =

Swiss bobsledder (1926–1996)

Personal information
- Nationality: Swiss
- Born: 1 March 1926; Konolfingen, Switzerland
- Died: 9 January 1996 (aged 69)

Sport
- Sport: Bobsleigh

Oskar Lory (1 March 1926 – 9 January 1996) was a Swiss bobsledder. He competed in the two-man and the four-man events at the 1964 Winter Olympics.
