= Ludwig Siebert (bobsleigh) =

German bobsledder (1939–2016)

Medal record

Men's Bobsleigh

Representing West Germany

World Championships
| Gold medal – first place | 1962 Garmisch-Partenkirchen | Four-man |
| Gold medal – first place | 1966 Cortina d'Ampezzo | Four-man |

Ludwig Siebert (25 September 1939 – 9 December 2016) was a West German bobsledder who competed during the 1960s. He won two gold medals in the four-man event at the FIBT World Championships (1962, 1966). The gold in 1966 was awarded following a crash that killed his fellow athlete Toni Pensperger during the four-man event. Pensperger was posthumously awarded the gold medal, while Siebert and his surviving teammates, Helmut Werzer and Roland Ebert, received their golds as well. Siebert also finished fifth in the four-man event at the 1964 Winter Olympics in Innsbruck.
