= Hansjörg Farbmacher =

Austrian biathlete (1940–1982)

Personal information
- Nationality: Austrian
- Born: 20 September 1940 Innsbruck, Nazi Germany
- Died: 14 March 1982 (aged 41) Sistrans, Austria

Sport
- Sport: Biathlon, cross-country skiing

Hansjörg Farbmacher (20 September 1940 – 14 March 1982) was an Austrian skier. He competed at the 1964 Winter Olympics and the 1968 Winter Olympics.
