= Peter Toyfl =

Austrian speed skater (1941–2025)

Personal information
- Nationality: Austrian
- Born: 7 August 1941 Vienna, Austria
- Died: 4 May 2025 (aged 83)

Sport
- Sport: Speed skating

Peter Toyfl (7 August 1941 – 4 May 2025) was an Austrian speed skater. He competed in two events at the 1964 Winter Olympics. He died after a short, serious illness, on 4 May 2025, at the age of 83.
