= Sergio Mocellini =

Italian bobsledder (1936–2004)

Medal record

Bobsleigh

World Championships
Silver medal – second place	1963 Igls	Four-man

Sergio Mocellini (29 March 1936 – 4 December 2004) was an Italian bobsledder who competed during the 1960s. He won the silver medal in the four-man event at the 1963 FIBT World Championships in Igls. Mocellini finished fourth in the four-man at the 1964 Winter Olympics in Innsbruck and he also competed at the 1968 Winter Olympics.
