= Gildo Siorpaes =

Italian bobsledder (born 1938)

Olympic medal record

Bobsleigh

Representing Italy
Bronze medal – third place	1964 Innsbruck	Four-man

Gildo Siorpaes (born 12 January 1938 in Cortina d'Ampezzo) is an Italian bobsledder. He won a bronze medal in the four-man event at the 1964 Winter Olympics in Innsbruck.
