= Anton Kogler =

Austrian cross-country skier

Personal information
- Nationality: Austrian
- Born: 2 May 1939 (age 85); Rottenmann, Austria, Germany

Sport
- Sport: Cross-country skiing

Anton Kogler (born 2 May 1939) is an Austrian cross-country skier. He competed in the men's 15 kilometre event at the 1964 Winter Olympics.
