= Anton Wackerle =

German bobsledder

Personal information
- Nationality: German
- Born: 13 February 1938 (age 87); Garmisch-Partenkirchen, Germany

Sport
- Sport: Bobsleigh

Anton Wackerle (born 13 February 1938) is a German bobsledder. He competed in the four-man event at the 1964 Winter Olympics.
