= Alexandru Oancea (rugby union) =

Romanian rugby union footballer

- Full name: Alexandru-Claudiu Oancea
- Born: 25 May 1993 (age 33) Bucharest, Romania
- Height: 1.81 m (5 ft 11 1/2 in)
- Weight: 117 kg (18 st 6 lb; 258 lb)

Rugby union career
- Position: Hooker
- Current team: Știința Baia Mare
Youth career
- 2008–12: CS Metrorex București
Senior career
Years	Team	Apps	(Points)
2012–17	Știința Baia Mare	30	(15)
2017–19	CSM București	19	(10)
2019–present	Știința Baia Mare	7	(0)
- Correct as of 20 April 2020
Provincial / State sides
Years	Team	Apps	(Points)
2014–15	București Wolves	5	(0)
- Correct as of 20 April 2020
International career
Years	Team	Apps	(Points)
2014–present	Romania	1	(0)
- Correct as of 20 April 2020

Alexandru-Claudiu Oancea (born 25 May 1993) is a Romanian rugby union footballer. He plays as a hooker for professional SuperLiga club Știința Baia Mare.

== Club career ==
Oancea started playing rugby in 2008, at 15 years old, signing with Romanian youth club CS Metrorex București on 2 May 2008. After four years with Metrorex, Oancea signed on 25 July 2012 a 5-year contract with SuperLiga side Știința Baia Mare. At the end of his 5-year contract with Baia Mare, Oancea was signed by his hometown side, CSM București. In 2019, following the dissolution of his former club, CSM, he signed once again with Știința Baia Mare.

=== Provincial / State sides ===
Oancea was also selected between 2014 and 2015 for the State side assembled to play in the European Cups, namely București Wolves.

== International career ==
Oancea is also selected for Romania's national team, the Oaks, making his international debut during the 2014 IRB Nations Cup in a test match against Emerging Ireland.
