= Benito Rigoni =

Italian bobsledder (1936–2021)

Personal information
- Nationality: Italian
- Born: 11 April 1936 Asiago, Italy
- Died: 23 December 2021 (aged 85) Dueville, Italy
Medal record
Bobsleigh
Representing Italy
Olympic Games
Bronze medal – third place	1964 Innsbruck	Four-man

Benito Rigoni Stern (11 April 1936 – 23 December 2021) was an Italian bobsledder who competed in the early 1960s.

Rigoni was born in Asiago on 11 April 1936. He won a bronze medal in the four-man event at the 1964 Winter Olympics in Innsbruck. Rigoni died in Dueville on 23 December 2021, at the age of 85.
