= Hans Stoll (bobsleigh) =

Austrian bobsledder

Personal information
- Nationality: Austrian
- Born: 28 August 1941 (age 83); Innsbruck, Austria

Sport
- Sport: Bobsleigh

Hans Stoll (born 28 March 1941) is an Austrian bobsledder. He competed in the four-man event at the 1964 Winter Olympics.
