= Hans Kleinpeter =

Swiss bobsledder (1936–2004)

Personal information
- Nationality: Swiss
- Born: 1 February 1936; Zürich, Switzerland
- Died: December 2004

Sport
- Sport: Bobsleigh

Hans Kleinpeter (1 February 1936 – December 2004) was a Swiss bobsledder. He competed in the four-man event at the 1964 Winter Olympics.
