= Sergio Siorpaes =

Italian bobsledder (born 1934)

Medal record

Bobsleigh

Representing Italy

Olympic Games
Bronze medal – third place	1964 Innsbruck	Two-man
Bronze medal – third place	1964 Innsbruck	Four-man

World Championships
Gold medal – first place	1960 Cortina d'Ampezzo	Four-man
Gold medal – first place	1961 Lake Placid	Two-man
Gold medal – first place	1961 Lake Placid	Four-man
Gold medal – first place	1963 Igls	Two-man
Gold medal – first place	1966 Cortina d'Ampezzo	Two-man
Silver medal – second place	1958 Garmisch-Partenkirchen	Two-man
Silver medal – second place	1959 St. Moritz	Two-man

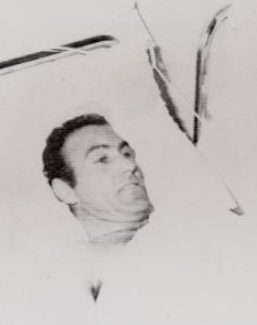
Siorpaes in the 1960s

Sergio Siorpaes (born 20 July 1934, in Cortina d'Ampezzo, Italy) is an Italian bobsledder. At the 1964 Winter Olympics in Innsbruck, he won bronze medals in the two-man and four-man events.

Siorpaes also won seven medals at the FIBT World Championships with five golds (Two-man: 1961, 1963, 1966; Four-man: 1960, 1961) and two silvers (Two-man: 1958, 1959).
