= Peter Kirby (pewtersmith) =

American pewtersmith

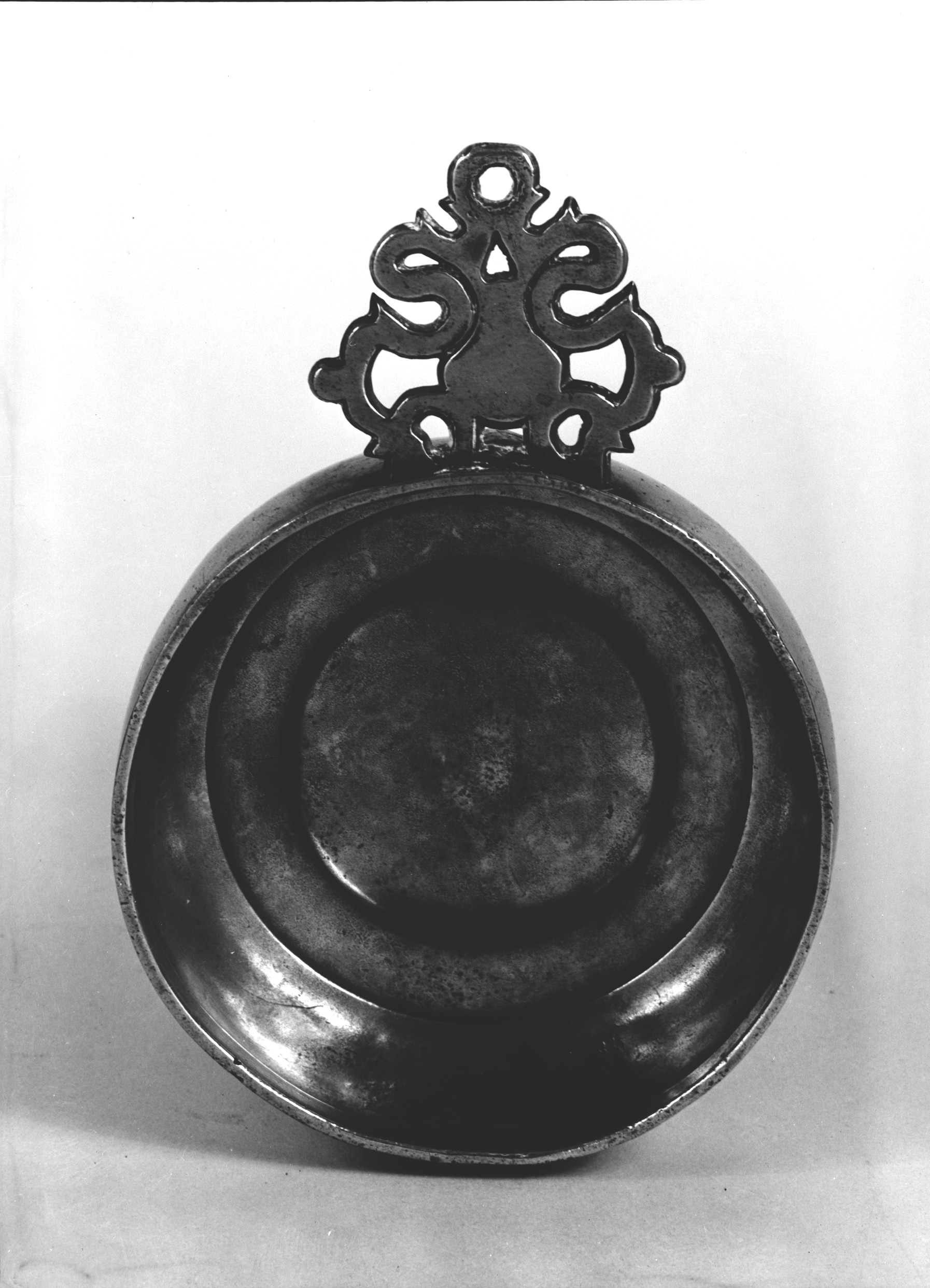
Porringer by Peter Kirby

Peter Kirby (died before October 13, 1788) was an early American pewtersmith active in New York City.

Kirby married Margaret Ellison on December 24, 1736, in New York City; their son was William Kirby, also a pewtersmith. He was appointed in 1759-1760 as the city's Assessor of North Ward and in 1765-1776 as Tax Collector of North Ward. His work is collected in the Metropolitan Museum of Art.
