= Andrew Hedges (bobsleigh) =

British bobsledder, racing driver and powerboat racer

Personal information
- Nationality: British
- Born: 16 September 1935 South Moreton, England
- Died: 1 October 2005 (aged 70) Bahrain

Sport
- Sport: Bobsleigh; Auto racing; Powerboat racing
Medal record
Commonwealth Winter Games
Silver medal – second place	1962 St Moritz	4 Man Bobsleigh

Andrew Hedges (16 September 1935 – 1 October 2005) was born in South Moreton, Oxfordshire and came from a family of farmers that owned a string of butcher’s shops across the country. He attended Radley College before being commissioned into the British Army and serving in the Household Cavalry. He briefly relocated to Switzerland and later joined the British bobsleigh team before his selection to the 1964 Olympic team to compete at Innsbruck. There, he competed in the two-man event alongside fellow Radley classmate Bill McCowen and the four-man event alongside McCowen, Robin Seel and Robin Widdows.

Hedges later became a noted race car driver in the 1960s, competing at six editions of the 24 Hours of Le Mans between 1964 and 1970. His finest achievement as a racing driver was in winning the gruelling 84-hour race, Marathon de la Route, with Belgian co-driver Julien Vernaeve, over the old Nürburgring circuit in 1966. Hedges was also an avid powerboat racer and took part in the Cowes-Torquay race. In 1966, he competed in the Miami to Nassau race with his partner, the infamous Lord Lucan. Their boat “Migrant” was the first single-engine boat to finish. He later moved to Bahrain to pursue business interests and remained there until his death in 2005. .
