= Bill McCowen =

British bobsledder (1937–2026)

Personal information
- Full name: Donald William Henry McCowen
- Nationality: British
- Born: 31 March 1937 Hampstead, London, England
- Died: 28 June 2026 (aged 89) Keswick, Virginia, U.S.

Sport
- Sport: Bobsleigh
Medal record
Commonwealth Winter Games
Silver medal – second place	1962 St Moritz	4 Man Bobsleigh

Donald William Henry McCowen (31 March 1937 – 28 June 2026) was a British bobsledder. He was the son of Olympic rower Richie McCowen. He competed in the two-man and the four-man events at the 1964 Winter Olympics.

McCowen died in Keswick, Virginia on 28 June 2026, aged 89.
