= Bill Dundon =

American bobsledder

Personal information
- Born: March 16, 1934 Watertown, New York, United States
- Died: January 5, 2011 (aged 76) New York, United States

Sport
- Sport: Bobsleigh

William Frederick Dundon (March 16, 1934 – January 5, 2011) was an American bobsledder. He competed in the four-man event at the 1964 Winter Olympics.
