= John Emery (bobsleigh) =

Canadian bobsledder (1932–2022)

Personal information
- Born: 4 January 1932 Montreal, Quebec, Canada
- Died: 21 February 2022 (aged 90)
Medal record
Bobsleigh
Representing Canada
Gold medal – first place	1964 Innsbruck	Four-man

John Emery (4 January 1932 – 21 February 2022) was a Canadian bobsledder who competed in the 1960s. He won a gold medal in the four-man event at the 1964 Winter Olympics in Innsbruck.

== Early life ==
John Emery was born on 4 January 1932 in Montreal, Quebec, Canada, and had a brother, Victor. Emery's father was a general in the Royal Canadian Navy, which caused his family to move frequently around locations in Canada, though they would spend time each summer in Thunder Bay, Ontario. After his death, his wife recalled that Emery developed a profound love for nature during these "On Golden Pond type" summers, which led to his love for the mountains.

== Bobsleigh ==
Victor Emery watched a bobsleigh race at the 1956 Winter Olympics in Cortina, Italy, and became passionate about the sport, which John soon came to love, too. In 1957, the brothers founded the Laurentian Bobsledding Association. They competed at the World Championships in Lake Placid, New York, in 1959, where they placed 13th (out of 16); they then began training at Lake Placid whenever they could, and steadily improved, but the Canadian Olympic Committee would not let their team enter the 1960 Winter Olympics, and claimed that nobody in Canada was interested in bobsleigh. They placed 4th at the 1962 World Championships. Though the bobsleigh runs at Lake Placid were available to them, they could not frequently travel, and often practiced "dry" at the local gymnasium.

They did enter the 1964 Winter Olympics in Innsbruck, Austria, the first time Canada contested bobsleigh. Unsponsored and with no national team, they paid for everything themselves. Spectators reportedly "thought it was a joke" that Canada entered a bobsleigh team that year, with several writing off the team as "playboys who came to the Games simply to party". These opinions prevailed as the nation had no training program or even a bobsled course, though the other teams instead saw the Canadians as intellectuals who had entered into the race by fluke, rather than playboys, as they all had advanced degrees and professional careers outside of sport.

While European teams (particularly the favourites, Italy and Austria) had ample opportunities to practice on the track at Innsbruck, the Canadians had never been before and were only able to have four practice runs before the event (which itself comprises four runs). The Italian team took the Canadians under their wing, mentoring them in practice at the Games. In their first competitive run, the four-man team broke the track record; the Canadians' total time over their four runs was 4:14.46 seconds, taking gold. Emery was the driver of the four-man sleigh that won the gold medal, and the team members were inducted into the Canada's Sports Hall of Fame that year, and the Canadian Olympic Hall of Fame in 1971.

The Emery brothers and different teammates then won the four-man bob event at the World Championships in 1965, after which John Emery stopped competing in bobsleigh. By 1967, the whole Olympic team had retired.

== Personal and later life ==
Emery was a reconstructive surgeon and philanthropist. He studied medicine at Queen's University, Ontario, and the University of Oxford, and took specialist reconstructive surgery studies in Scotland. In 1967, he opened a practice in San Francisco, California, and eventually settled in Sonoma, California. He met his future wife, Deborah, the year he started his practice; she was a model who had been recommended his services. They married on 17 October 1981, and were together until Emery's death. In his later years, Emery ran a vineyard. He was diagnosed with melanoma in his early 80s, and died from it on 21 February 2022, at the age of 90. He spoke five languages, and was accomplished in a variety of sports as well as bobsleigh.
