= Ferruccio Dalla Torre =

Italian bobsledder (1931–1987)

Medal record

Bobsleigh

World Championships
Gold medal – first place	1963 Igls	Four-man
Silver medal – second place	1959 St. Moritz	Four-man
Silver medal – second place	1962 Garmisch-Partenkirchen	Four-man

Ferruccio Dalla Torre (sometimes shown as Ferruccio dalla Torre; 4 November 1931 – 12 March 1987) was an Italian bobsledder who competed from the late 1950s to the mid-1960s. He won three medals in the four-man event at the FIBT World Championships with one gold (1963) and two silvers (1959, 1962).

Dalla Torre also finished fourth in the four-man event at the 1964 Winter Olympics in Innsbruck.
