= Andreas Arnold =

Austrian bobsledder

Personal information
- Nationality: Austrian
- Born: 20 January 1941 (age 84) Tulfes, Austria

Sport
- Sport: Bobsleigh

Andreas Arnold (born 20 January 1941) is an Austrian bobsledder. He competed in the four-man event at the 1964 Winter Olympics.
