= Alexandru Oancea (bobsleigh) =

Romanian bobsledder

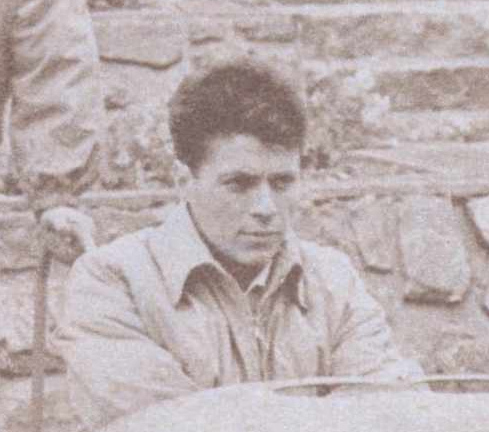
- Oancea in 1965

Personal information
- Nationality: Romanian
- Born: 12 January 1937 (age 89) Brașov, Romania

Sport
- Sport: Bobsleigh

Alexandru Oancea (born 12 January 1937) is a Romanian bobsledder. He competed in the two-man event at the 1964 Winter Olympics.
