= Franz Isser =

Austrian bobsledder (1932–2024)

Medal record

Bobsleigh

World Championships
Bronze medal – third place	1962 Garmisch-Partenkirchen	Four-man

Franz Isser (17 August 1932 – 16 March 2024) was an Austrian bobsledder who competed during the 1960s. Along with Pepi Isser, Heini Isser, and Fritz Isser, he won the bronze medal in the four-man event at the 1962 FIBT World Championships in Garmisch-Partenkirchen. He also competed in the two-man event at the 1964 Winter Olympics. Isser died on 16 March 2024, at the age of 91.
