= Günther Rieger =

Austrian cross-country skier

Personal information
- Nationality: Austrian
- Born: 4 March 1939 (age 86)

Sport
- Sport: Cross-country skiing

Günther Rieger (born 4 March 1939) is an Austrian cross-country skier. He competed in the men's 15 kilometre event at the 1964 Winter Olympics.
