= Robin Dixon, 3rd Baron Glentoran =

Politician, military officer, and bobsledder from Northern Ireland

Major The Right Honourable The Lord Glentoran CBE

Member of the House of Lords
- Lord Temporal
- Hereditary peerage 13 November 1995 – 11 November 1999
- Preceded by: The 2nd Baron Glentoran
- Succeeded by: Seat abolished
- Elected Hereditary Peer; 11 November 1999 – 1 June 2018
- Election: 1999
- Preceded by: Seat established
- Succeeded by: The 5th Baron Bethell

Personal details
- Born: Thomas Valerian Dixon; 21 April 1935 (age 91)
- Party: Conservative
- Children: 3
- Sports career
Medal record
Bobsleigh
Representing Great Britain
Olympic Games
Gold medal – first place	1964 Innsbruck	Two-man
World Championships
Gold medal – first place	1965 St. Moritz	Two-man
Bronze medal – third place	1963 Igls	Two-man
Bronze medal – third place	1966 Cortina d'Ampezzo	Two-man
Commonwealth Winter Games
Silver medal – second place	1958 St Moritz	2 Man Bobsleigh

Major Thomas "Robin" Valerian Dixon, 3rd Baron Glentoran, CBE (born 21 April 1935), is a former British bobsledder and Northern Irish politician, known as Robin Dixon. He is a former Conservative Party Shadow Minister for the Olympics.

== Early life ==
Dixon was educated at Eton and Grenoble in France. After university, he served with the Grenadier Guards from 1954 to 1966, including service in the Cyprus Emergency.

== Sports career ==
In 1964, Dixon was granted leave from the army to participate in the 1964 Winter Olympics at Innsbruck, where he won the gold medal in the Two-man Bobsleigh as brakeman to Tony Nash. Nash and Dixon also won three medals in the two-man event at the FIBT World Championships with one gold (1965) and two bronzes (1963, 1966).

Dixon retained his sporting links throughout his life: he was president of the jury at the 1976 Winter Olympics, set up the Ulster Games Foundation in 1983, and was appointed chairman of the Northern Ireland Tall Ships Council in 1987. He has been president of the British Bobsleigh Association since 1987.

== Business ==
Dixon retired from the army in 1966 with the rank of Major and went on to work for Kodak in their public relations department and in 1971 joined the Northern Irish business, Redland Tile and Brick Ltd, which he built up into a multimillion-pound subsidiary of Redland plc and became managing director. In 1983, he was appointed High Sheriff of Antrim.

Upon the 1995 death of his father, the 2nd Baron Glentoran, Dixon inherited his title, and he retired from business in 1998.

== Political career ==
Dixon was Chairman of Positively Belfast from 1992 to 1996, Chairman of the "Growing a Green Economy" Committee from 1993 to 1995 and has been Shadow Minister for Northern Ireland, Shadow Minister for Sport and Shadow Minister for Environment, Food and Rural Affairs. He is also a member of the British-Irish Parliamentary Body.

Lord Glentoran was one of 92 hereditary peers that remain in the House of Lords after the passing of the House of Lords Act 1999, and sat on the Conservative benches until his retirement from the House on 1 June 2018.

== Personal life ==
Lord Glentoran has three sons from his first wife, Rona (divorced in 1975), and lives with his third wife, Margaret, in their family home, Drumadarragh House, near Ballyclare. His eldest son, Daniel, has two sons; his second, Andrew, a son and a daughter, and his youngest, Patrick, has one daughter.

== Honours ==
Dixon and his driver, Tony Nash, were inducted into the British Bobsleigh Hall of Fame as a result of their success. In the 1969 New Year Honours, Dixon was appointed Member of the Order of the British Empire (MBE), as was Nash, for services to winter sports. A curve at the St. Moritz-Celerina Olympic Bobrun is named for both Nash and Dixon.

In 1987, Dixon was appointed Honorary Colonel of the 5th Battalion, Royal Irish Rangers (27th (Inniskilling), 83rd and 87th).

Dixon was promoted to Commander of the Order of the British Empire (CBE) in the 1992 Birthday Honours for services to sport and to the community in Northern Ireland.

Coat of arms of Robin Dixon, 3rd Baron Glentoran
Crest A demi-lion rampant Azure, charged on the shoulder with a cross patonce surrounded by a civic crown Or. Escutcheon Or on a chevron Vair three billets of the first on a chief crenellé Gules a tower proper between two fleurs-de-lis Or. Supporters Two war horses Argent unglued Or caparisoned Proper the shabraque Sable broidered of the second. Motto Fide Et Constantia (By Fidelity And Constancy)

== See also ==
- List of Northern Ireland Members of the House of Lords

Peerage of the United Kingdom
Preceded by Daniel Dixon	Baron Glentoran; 1995–present Member of the House of Lords (1995–1999)	Incumbent; Heir apparent: Hon. Daniel Dixon
Parliament of the United Kingdom
New office created by the House of Lords Act 1999	Elected hereditary peer to the House of Lords under the House of Lords Act 1999; 1999–2018	Succeeded by The Lord Bethell
