= Sergio Zardini =

Italian bobsledder (1931–1966)

Medal record

Bobsleigh

Representing Italy

Olympic Games
Silver medal – second place	1964 Innsbruck	Two-man

World Championships
Gold medal – first place	1963 Igls	Four-man
Silver medal – second place	1958 Garmisch-Partenkirchen	Two-man
Silver medal – second place	1959 St. Moritz	Two-man
Silver medal – second place	1959 St. Moritz	Four-man
Silver medal – second place	1962 Garmisch-Partenkirchen	Two-man
Silver medal – second place	1962 Garmisch-Partenkirchen	Four-man
Silver medal – second place	1963 Igls	Two-man
Bronze medal – third place	1958 Garmisch-Partenkirchen	Four-man
Bronze medal – third place	1960 Cortina d'Ampezzo	Two-man
Bronze medal – third place	1961 Lake Placid	Two-man

Sergio Zardini (22 November 1931 – 22 February 1966) was an Italian bobsledder who competed from the late 1950s to the mid-1960s. He won the silver medal in the two-man event at the 1964 Winter Olympics in Innsbruck. He was born in Turin.

Zardini also won ten medals at the FIBT World Championships with one gold (Four-man: 1963), six silvers (Two-man: 1958, 1959, 1962, 1963; Four-man: 1959, 1962), and three bronzes (Two-man: 1960, 1961; Four-man: 1958).

Following the 1964 games, Zardini emigrated to Canada where he continued to compete in bobsledding. He was killed during a competition two years later at the bobsleigh track in Lake Placid, New York, when the Canadian four-man sled hit the superstructure of the track at Turns 13 and 14, known as the "Zig-Zag Curves", crushing his head against the structure.
