= Robert Zimmermann (bobsleigh) =

Swiss bobsledder (1934–2012)

Personal information
- Nationality: Swiss
- Born: 6 September 1934; Zürich, Switzerland
- Died: 20 June 2012 (aged 77); Zürich, Switzerland

Sport
- Sport: Bobsleigh

Robert Zimmermann (6 September 1934 – 20 June 2012) was a Swiss bobsledder. He competed at the 1964 Winter Olympics and the 1968 Winter Olympics. He was also a stuntman, and worked on the James Bond film On Her Majesty's Secret Service.
