= Andreas Janc =

Austrian cross-country skier

Personal information
- Nationality: Austrian
- Born: 1 February 1938 Zabreznica, Yugoslavia
- Died: 30 November 2018 (aged 80) Schwarzach, Vorarlberg

Sport
- Sport: Cross-country skiing

Andreas Janc (1 February 1938 – 30 November 2018) was an Austrian cross-country skier. He competed at the 1964 Winter Olympics and the 1968 Winter Olympics.
