= Lawrence McKillip =

American bobsledder

Personal information
- Born: July 25, 1924 Saranac Lake, New York, United States
- Died: October 19, 1986 (aged 62) Fruitland Park, Florida, United States

Sport
- Sport: Bobsleigh

Lawrence McKillip (July 25, 1924 – October 19, 1986) was an American bobsledder. He competed at the 1956 Winter Olympics and the 1964 Winter Olympics.
