= Jean-Marie Buisset =

Belgian sportsman (1938–2010)

Jean-Marie Buisset (21 August 1938, in Anderlecht – 7 February 2010) was a Belgium field hockey player and bobsledder. He competed at both the Summer and Winter Olympic Games.

As a field hockey player Buisset competed at the 1964, 1968 and 1972 Olympic Games. He also competed at the 1964 Winter Olympics as a bobsledder in both the 2 and 4 man events.

Buisset died after a short illness on 7 February 2010.
