= Chuck Pandolph =

American bobsledder

Medal record

Bobsleigh

World Championships
Silver medal – second place	1961 Lake Placid	Four-man

Charles "Chuck" Pandolph, Sr. (1924–1973) was an American bobsledder who competed from the early 1950s to the early 1960s. He won a silver medal in the four-man event at the 1961 FIBT World Championships in Lake Placid, New York.

A native of Saranac Lake, New York, Pandolph also competed in two Winter Olympics, earning his best finish of sixth in the four-man event at Innsbruck in 1964.

After retiring from bobsled, Pandolph ran a bar in Saranac Lake called "Chuck's Bar". He was married with a son, Chuck, Jr. His grandson, Corey (born 1971), is best known for the online comic Barkeater Lake.

Pandolph died in 1973. He also served in the United States Marine Corps during World War II and was a police officer during his life.
