= Adolf Koxeder =

Austrian bobsledder (born 1934)

Medal record

Men's bobsleigh

Representing Austria

Olympic Games
Silver medal – second place	1964 Innsbruck	Four-man

World Championships
Bronze medal – third place	1963 Igls	Four-man

European Championships
Gold medal – first place	1965 Cortina d'Ampezzo	Two-man
Gold medal – first place	1966 Garmisch-Partenkirchen	Two-man
Silver medal – second place	1967 Igls	Four-man

Adolf Koxeder (born 9 October 1934) is an Austrian bobsledder who competed in the 1960s. He won a silver medal in the four-man event at the 1964 Winter Olympics in Innsbruck.

Koxeder also won a bronze medal in the four-man event at the 1963 FIBT World Championships in Igls.
