= Peter Kirby (bobsleigh) =

Canadian bobsledder

Medal record

Bobsleigh

Representing Canada

Olympic Games
Gold medal – first place	1964 Innsbruck	Four-man

World Championships
Gold medal – first place	1965 St. Moritz	Four-man

Peter Kirby (born December 17, 1931) is a Canadian bobsledder who competed in the mid-1960s. He won a gold medal in the four-man event at the 1964 Winter Olympics in Innsbruck. He was born in Montreal, Quebec.

Kirby also won a gold medal in the four-man event at the 1965 FIBT World Championships in St. Moritz. He worked as a geologist until his retirement.
