= Romano Bonagura =

Italian bobsledder (1930–2010)

Medal record

Bobsleigh

Representing Italy

Olympic Games
Silver medal – second place	1964 Innsburck	Two-man

World Championships
Gold medal – first place	1963 Igls	Four-man
Silver medal – second place	1959 St. Moritz	Four-man
Silver medal – second place	1962 Garmisch-Partenkirchen	Two-man
Silver medal – second place	1962 Garmisch-Partenkirchen	Four-man
Silver medal – second place	1963 Igls	Two-man
Bronze medal – third place	1961 Lake Placid	Two-man

Romano Bonagura (15 October 1930 – 30 October 2010) was an Italian bobsleigher who competed from the late 1950s to the mid-1960s, born in Ravenna. He won the silver medal in the two-man event at the 1964 Winter Olympics in Innsbruck.

Bonagura also won six medals at the FIBT World Championships with one gold (Four-man: 1963), four silvers (Two-man: 1962, 1963; Four-man: 1959, 1962), and one bronze (Two-man: 1961).
