= Tony Nash (bobsledder) =

British bobsledder (1936–2022)

Medal record

Bobsleigh

Representing Great Britain

Olympic Games
Gold medal – first place	1964 Innsbruck	Two-man

World Championships
Gold medal – first place	1965 St. Moritz	Two-man
Bronze medal – third place	1963 Igls	Two-man
Bronze medal – third place	1966 Cortina d'Ampezzo	Two-man

Commonwealth Winter Games
Silver medal – second place	1958 St Moritz	4 Man Bobsleigh
Gold medal – first place	1962 St Moritz	2 Man Bobsleigh
Gold medal – first place	1966 St Moritz	2 Man Bobsleigh

Antony James Dillon Nash MBE (18 March 1936 – 17 March 2022) was a British bobsledder, born in Amersham, who competed in the 1960s. Competing in two Winter Olympics, he won the gold in the two-man event at the 1964 Winter Olympics in Innsbruck.

== Biography ==
Nash was born in Great Missenden, Buckinghamshire on 18 March 1936.

He also won three medals in the two-man event at the FIBT World Championships with one gold (1965) and two bronzes (1963, 1966).

Nash and his brakeman, Robin Dixon, were inducted into the British Bobsleigh Hall of Fame as a result of their success. A curve at the St. Moritz-Celerina Olympic Bobrun is named for both Nash and Dixon.

He was appointed Member of the Order of the British Empire (MBE) in the 1969 New Year Honours for services to Winter Sports.

Nash died from heart failure in his sleep, at his home in Butterleigh, Devon, on 17 March 2022, aged 85.

== Sources ==
- Bobsleigh two-man Olympic medalists 1932-56 and since 1964 Archived 10 August 2011 at the Wayback Machine
- Bobsleigh two-man world championship medalists since 1931
- British Bobsleigh Hall of Fame featuring Nash
- DatabaseOlympics.com profile
- Wallenchinsky, David. (1984). "Bobsled: Two-man". In The Complete Book of the Olympics: 1896-1980. New York: Penguin Books. p. 559.
