= Reinhold Durnthaler =

Austrian bobsledder (1942–2017)

Medal record

Men's bobsleigh

Representing Austria

Olympic Games
Silver medal – second place	1964 Innsbruck	Four-man
Silver medal – second place	1968 Grenoble	Four-man

World Championships
Gold medal – first place	1967 Alpe d'Huez	Two-man
Bronze medal – third place	1963 Igls	Four-man

European Championships
Gold medal – first place	1967 Igls	Two-man
Gold medal – first place	1969 Cervinia	Two-man
Silver medal – second place	1967 Igls	Four-man

Reinhold Durnthaler (sometimes spelled as Dumthaler, 29 November 1942 – 23 October 2017) was an Austrian bobsledder who competed in the 1960s. He won two silver medals in the four-man event at the 1964 and 1968 Winter Olympics.

Durnthaler also won two medals at the FIBT World Championships with gold in the two-man event in 1967 and a bronze in the four-man event in 1963.
