= Josef Nairz =

Austrian bobsledder (born 1936)

Medal record

Bobsleigh

Representing Austria

Olympic Games
Silver medal – second place	1964 Innsbruck	Four-man

World Championships
Bronze medal – third place	1963 Igls	Four-man

Josef Nairz (born 5 November 1936) is an Austrian bobsledder who competed in the 1960s. He won a silver medal in the four-man event at the 1964 Winter Olympics in Innsbruck.

Nairz also won a bronze medal in the four-man event at the 1963 FIBT World Championships in Igls.
