= Vic Emery =

Canadian athlete and businessman

Personal information
- Born: June 28, 1933 (age 93) Montreal, Quebec, Canada
Medal record
Bobsleigh
Representing Canada
Olympic Games
Gold medal – first place	1964 Innsbruck	Four-man
Representing Canada
World Championships
Gold medal – first place	1965 St. Moritz	Four-man
Bronze medal – third place	1965 St. Moritz	Two-man

Victor Emery (born June 28, 1933) is a Canadian athlete and businessman. Emery was born in Montreal, Quebec. He is a gold medallist in the four man bobsleigh pilot from the 1964 Olympic Winter Games, as well as the 1965 World Championships.

Involved in diverse athletics from a young age, Emery, was a "Mustang" in swimming, wrestling and skiing at the University of Western Ontario. He later graduated with an MBA from the Harvard Business School.

Emery attempted to ski across the mountains from St. Moritz to Cortina in order to watch the 1956 Winter Olympics. However, there was little snow near Merano. By chance, the British Bobsleigh Team gave him a lift the rest of the way. In spite of that long ride on a bobsleigh seat in an open truck at -20, this is where his interest in the bob sport was inspired.

He became a "surrogate" Spaniard on the Marquis de Portago's bob team in St Moritz's Swiss Meisterschaft, which followed the Olympics.

Portago subsequently encouraged Emery to try his hand at piloting a bobsleigh by loaning him a Spanish sled. Emery, who was a Navy Reserve pilot familiar with unusual positions, became immediately hooked on bob sleighing. He and a fellow Western graduate - Lamont Gordon, gained enough competency in Lake Placid to represent Canada in the 1959 World Bobsleigh Championships in St Moritz, accompanied by Vic's brother John and Charles Rathgeb.

Their performance was less than stellar in 1959, however, Emery sought guidance from the great world champion and 1956 Olympic Silver medallist, Eugenio Monti, who became a lifelong friend, mentoring Vic at annual World Championships from there on.

The initial goal of Vic and his teammates was to be the first Canadian bobsleigh team to compete in the Winter Olympic Games. Squaw Valley, host of the 1960 Winter Olympics, did not build a bobsleigh run for the Games, and so, the bobsledders of the time, including Monti and other world champions, chomped at the bit for the eight years from 1956 for another chance at Olympic medals.

Canada's Bobsleigh contingent realized their dream at the 1964 Winter Olympics in Innsbruck, Austria. Without corporate or government sponsorship, they purchased their equipment and generally paid their own way. And while strong in pre-race practice runs, they were given little chance against Monti's Italian world champion team, and double silver medallist in the 1956 Olympics, also the heavily favoured Austrians, as well as the Swiss, German champions and other long standing bobsledders. In the first heat, however, the Canadians astonished everyone, with a magical run which set a track record, leading the field by over a half second.

Their sled's axle was damaged when hitting a side wall in the finish straight. With little time allotted between heats, if the Canadians had missed their starting slot, the team would have been disqualified. However, Emery's rival and friend, Eugenio Monti and his mechanics, came to the rescue, adequately repairing the sled in time. The team carried on with second fastest second and third heats, and then, on the third day of the competition garnered another first place in the fourth heat to win overall by a full second.

Alongside his comfort with the Igls bob Track, Vic Emery attributes their win to team spirit credited to the number two man - Doug Anakin, a former Intercollegiate wrestling finalist, the strength of brakeman Peter Kirby, a former FIS skier for Canada and strong start helped by the speed of Vic's track star brother Dr. John in the #3 slot. John forsook his place as pilot of the other Canadian four man sled in favour of joining Vic's team during the last days before the four man competition. With him on board, Canada's starts became almost as good as those of the Austrian and Italian teams which came second and third.

In the same Olympics, Vic Emery & Peter Kirby earned a fourth-place finish in the two-man bobsled competition.

The following year, 1965, in St Moritz, Vic Emery's team, with new additions Gerald Presley and Michael Young sandwiched between him and brakeman Peter Kirby, won the FIBT World Bobsled Championship. Emery and Young finished third in the two-man event.

In 1966, due to a deteriorating track which precipitated a tragic crash killing the German pilot, the World four man Bob Championships in Cortina were cancelled part way through. By 1967, the Emery team retired from bob sleighing then, however encouraged the young through their example and by recruitment to firmly establish the sport of bobsleigh on Canadian soil, now supported by bobsleigh tracks in both Alberta (1988 Winter Olympics) and British Columbia (2010 Winter Olympics).

Today, after reactivating the Lake Louise Ski area and a number of other entrepreneurial, corporate and philanthropic activities, Vic Emery is retired and living in Europe - London and Oslo.

The two Emery brothers, Anakin and Kirby, were inducted into Canada's Sports Hall of Fame in 1964 and Canada's Olympic Hall of Fame in 1971. Young and Presley also followed into Canada's Sports Hall of Fame after the 1965 win.
