= February 1966 =

Month of 1966

<<	February 1966					>>
Su	Mo	Tu	We	Th	Fr	Sa
		1	2	3	4	5
6	7	8	9	10	11	12
13	14	15	16	17	18	19
20	21	22	23	24	25	26
27	28

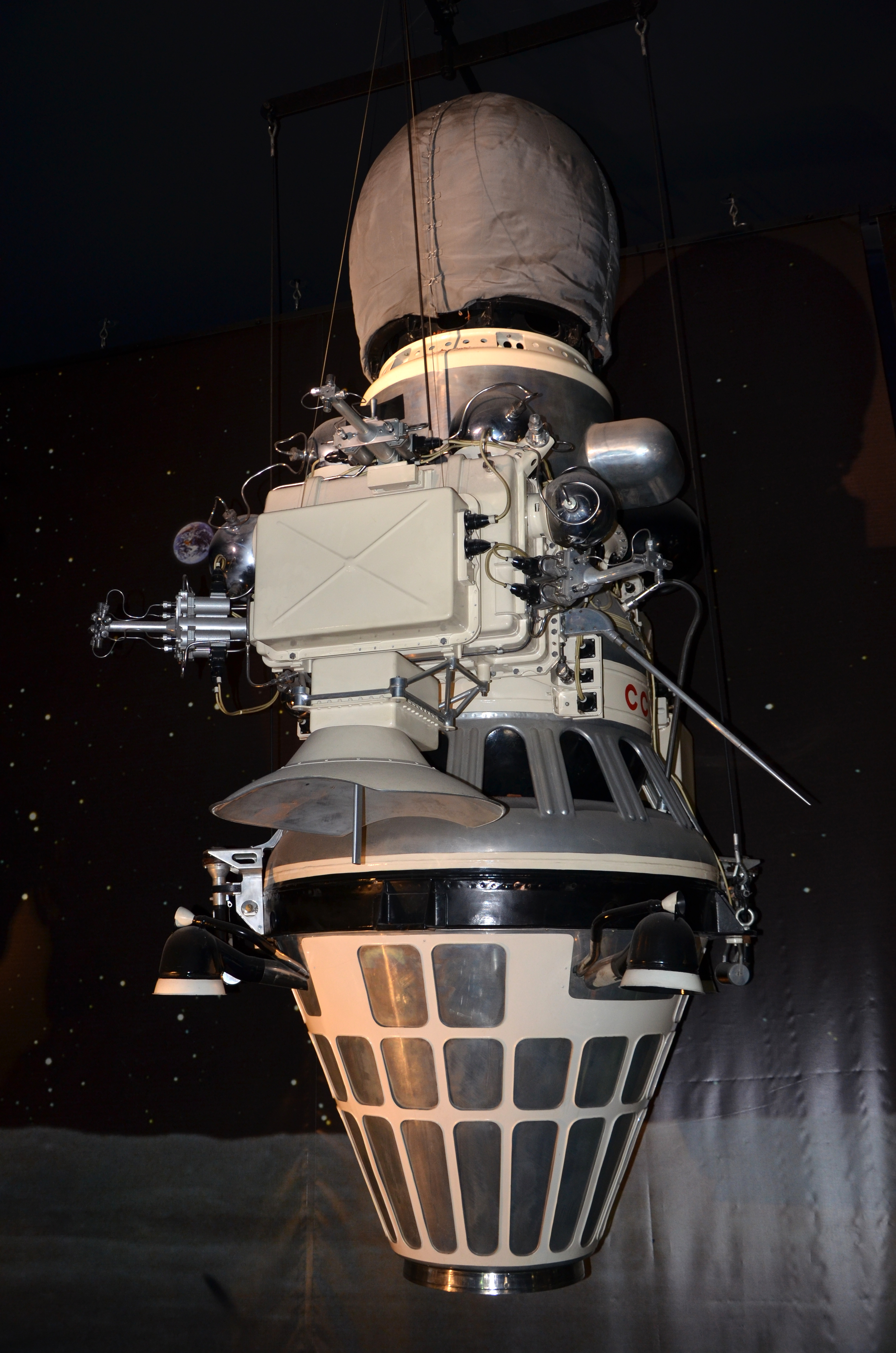
February 3, 1966: Soviet probe Luna 9 sends back the first pictures transmitted from the Moon's surface

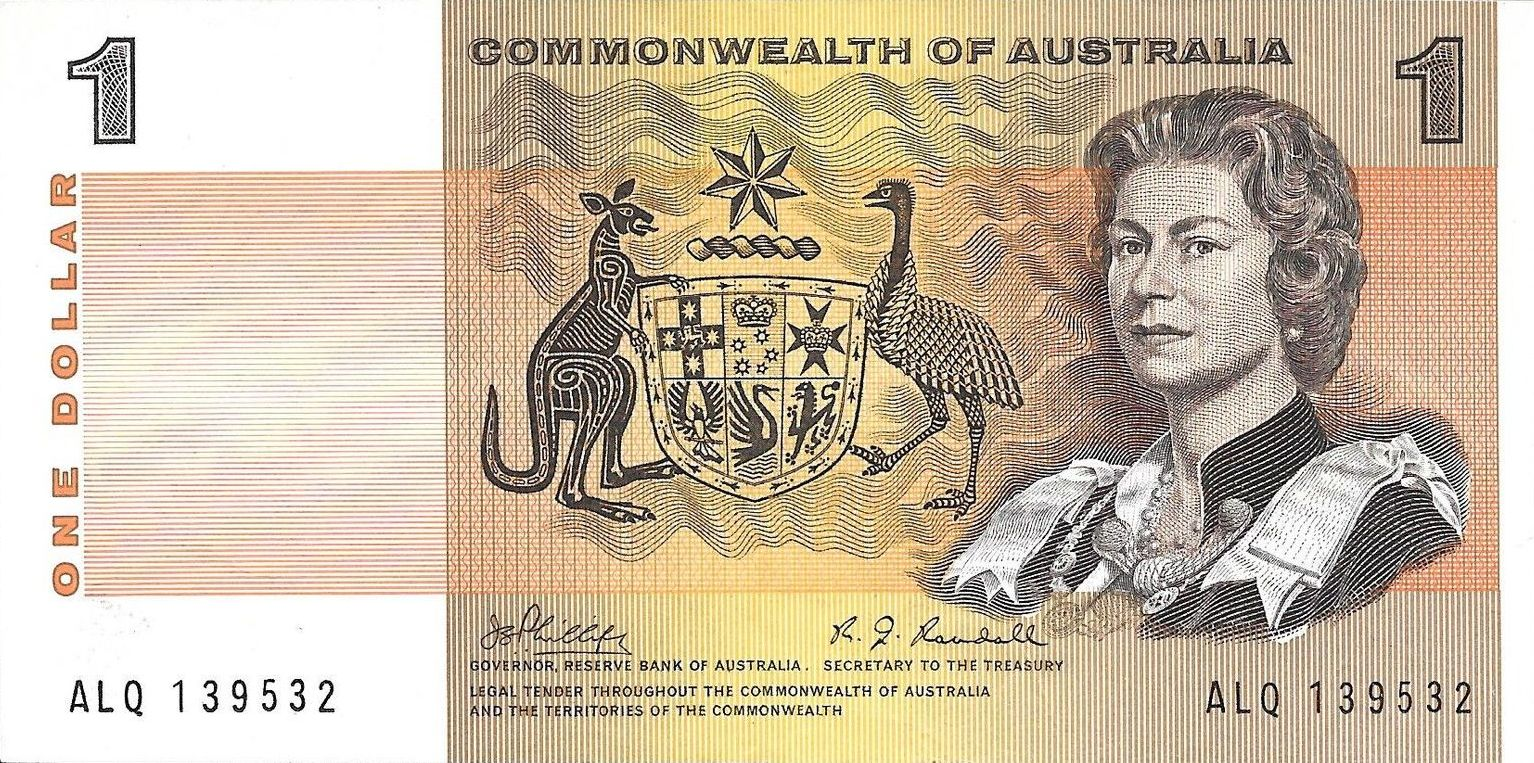
February 14, 1966: Australia goes decimal, introduces the dollar...

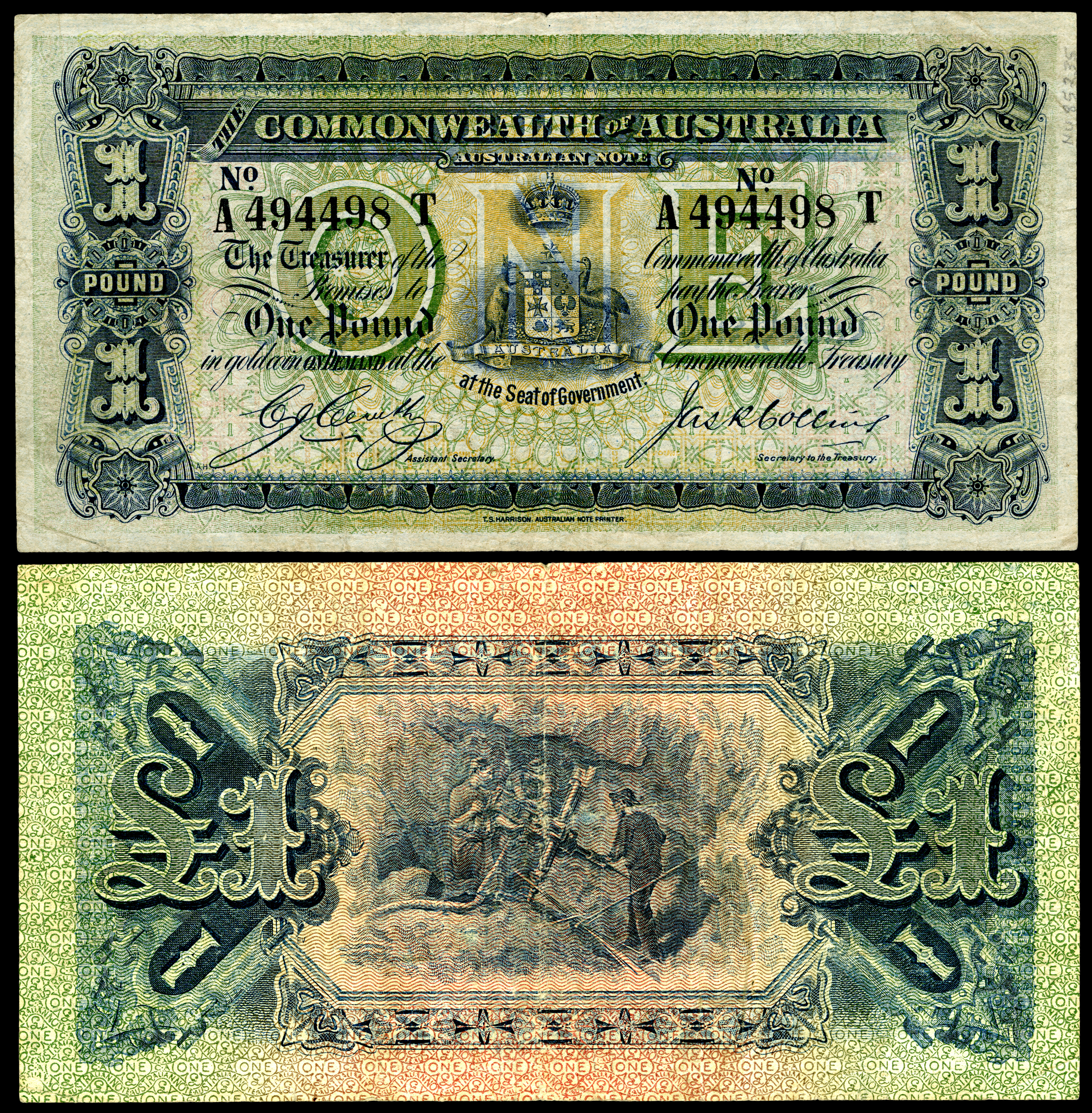
... and phases out the pound

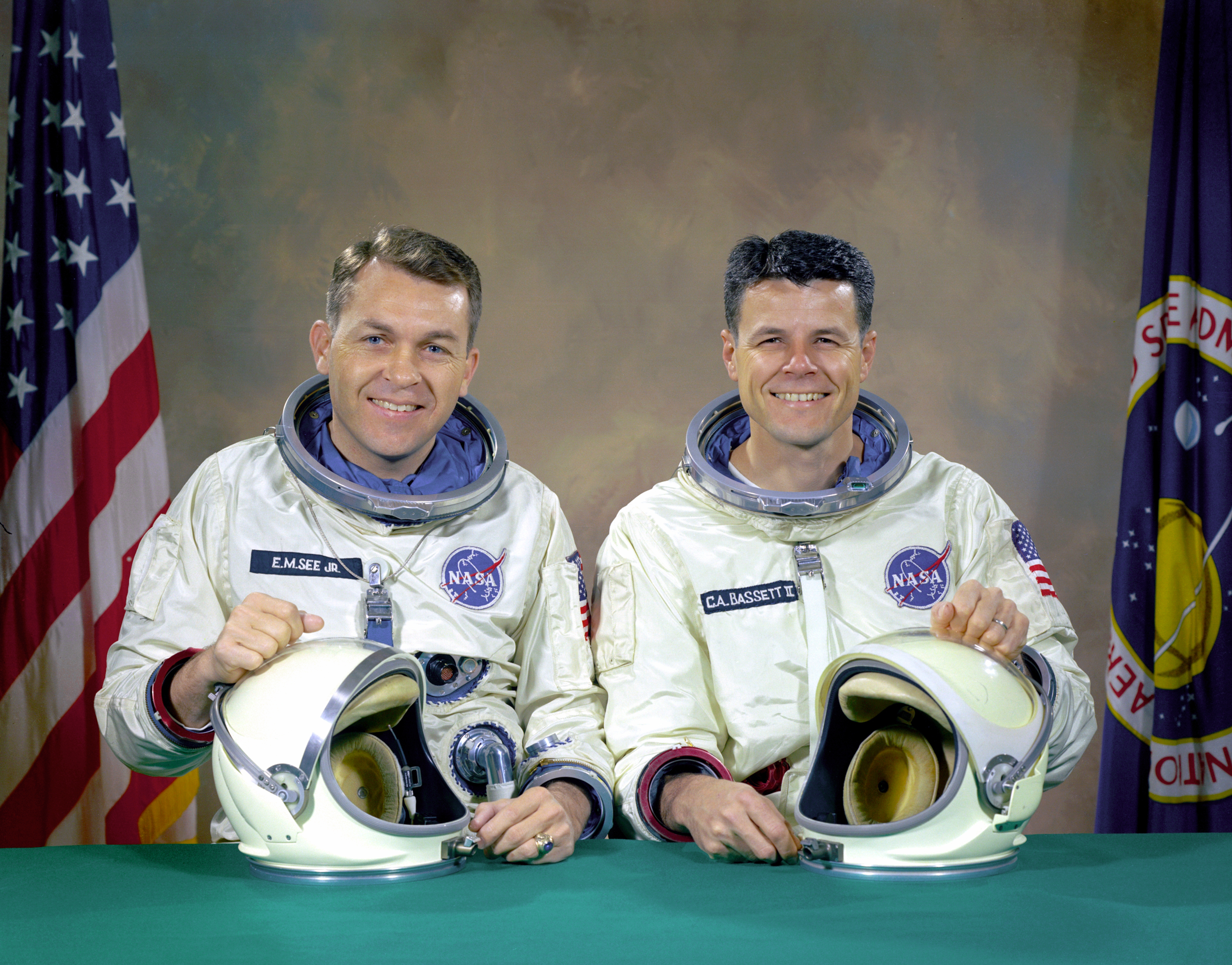
February 28, 1966: U.S. astronauts Charles Bassett and Elliot See die in plane crash three months before scheduled Gemini 9 mission

The following events occurred in February 1966:

== February 1, 1966 (Tuesday) ==
- West Germany bartered for the release of 2,600 political prisoners from East Germany by a transaction involving the export of $24,250,000 worth of West German consumer goods to their East German neighbors, in return for allowing the prisoners to depart the Communist nation. The New York Times described the agreement as "payment of ransom of up to $10,000 per prisoner". The goods, scarce in the East and abundant in the West, were items such as coffee, fresh fruit and butter, as well as fertilizer.
- In the United States, 19 employees of the John W. Campbell farms in Dade County, Florida, were killed when the bus they were riding in was struck by a freight train. The men were being brought home after a day's work of harvesting vegetables, and the Seaboard Lines train was on its way to the farm to pick up the cars that had been loaded with produce. All of the dead were migrant workers from Puerto Rico, and most of them were young men in their 20s.
- International pressure against the white-minority government of Rhodesia (now Zimbabwe) was stepped up when three major airlines serving the nation— British Overseas Airways Corporation (BOAC), British United Airways and Alitalia— made their last flights into the capital at Salisbury (now Harare), then departed and canceled further service.
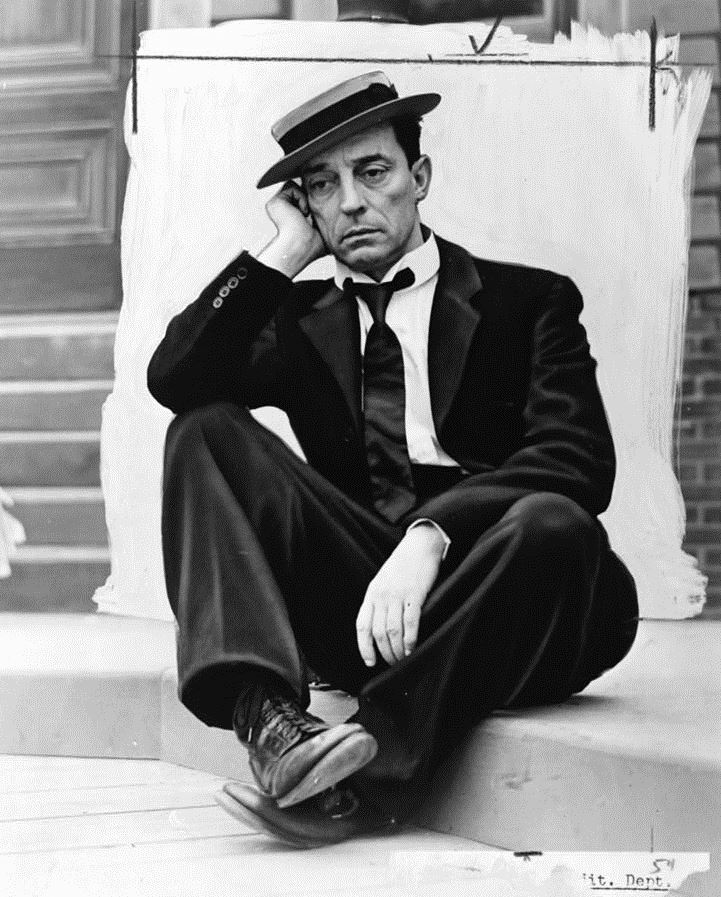
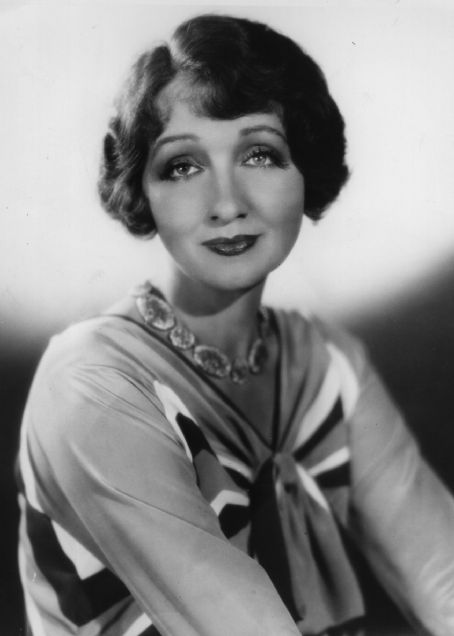
Buster Keaton / Hedda Hopper
- Died:
  - Buster Keaton, 70, American film comedian known for his daring stunts, died from lung cancer.
  - Hedda Hopper, 80, American gossip columnist, died from pleural pneumonia.

== February 2, 1966 (Wednesday) ==
- American adventurer Nick Piantanida set off in the Strato Jump II from a park in Sioux Falls, South Dakota, in an attempt to make the highest parachute jump ever, and inadvertently reached the highest altitude ever reached by a balloonist. When he reached his target altitude of 110,000 feet (34,000 m), he prepared to jump and then discovered that the oxygen hose that tethered him to the gondola was frozen and could not be disconnected. While he struggled to set himself free, the balloon continued to climb until he was more than 23 miles (37 km) high. At 123,500 feet (37,600 m), he aborted the parachute jump, separated the gondola from the balloon, and spent the next 32 minutes descending to Earth while the gondola's parachute system slowed his fall. Besides not being able to set the parachute record, he did not set an officially recognized altitude record either, because he had returned to Earth without the balloon. Three months later, on May 1, Pantanida would make a new attempt to set a record, but would suffer a fatal accident on Strato Jump III.
- At Belmore Park in Sydney, three young Australian men became the first people to burn their draft registration cards as a protest against Australia's participation in the Vietnam War. Wayne Haylen, Barry Robinson and Greg Barker stood before a crowd of 200 people and declared their intention to refuse the draft.
- A vulture collided with a Pakistan International Airlines helicopter, causing a rotor blade to tear off, and killing 24 of the 25 people on board. The accident occurred as the helicopter was approaching a landing in Faridpur in what is now Bangladesh.
- At a mission planning meeting for Project Gemini flights 9 through 12, held at McDonnell Aircraft Corporation, the joint group decided on using the Agena target vehicle primary propulsion system the Gemini spacecraft into an unprecedented high elliptic orbit of up to 700 nautical miles (1,300 km; 810 mi). Since reentry from the high altitude would be unsafe, the Agena system would return the spacecraft to a 161-mile (259 km) circular orbit for nominal reentry.
- Go-Set, Australia's first pop music newspaper, was launched in Melbourne.

== February 3, 1966 (Thursday) ==
- At 18:45:30 UTC (9:45 p.m. in Moscow), the uncrewed Soviet Luna 9 became the first object to make a controlled landing on the Moon, touching down in the Oceanus Procellarum to the northwest of the Reiner crater. It began transmitting signals four minutes later, and within 20 minutes of landing, sent back the first ground-level photographs of the Moon's surface. Although the arrival was not quite a "soft" landing— the capsule was ejected when the descent module was 16 feet (4.9 m) above the surface, and bounced several times before coming to rest— it was a more gentle descent than previous probes that had crashed into the ground. The pictures would yield an important discovery, demonstrating that the surface of the Moon was solid rock, rather than the accumulation of eons of dust deposits, and therefore would be suitable for a human landing.

== February 4, 1966 (Friday) ==
- All 133 people on All Nippon Airways Flight 60 were killed when the airliner plunged into Tokyo Bay as it was making its approach to Tokyo at the end of a flight from Sapporo. At 6:59 p.m., the Boeing 727 jet had descended into the water short of the runway, broke apart and sank. At the time, the 133 deaths were the largest single-plane fatality and the second deadliest plane crash in history.
- Winnie the Pooh and the Honey Tree, a featurette based on the first two chapters of Winnie-the-Pooh by A. A. Milne, was released by Buena Vista Distribution as a double feature with The Ugly Dachshund. It was the first animated featurette in the Winnie the Pooh film series. It was also the last short film to be produced by Walt Disney, who died of lung cancer ten months after its release.
- Physicist Peter P. Sorokin and his colleague John K. Lankard demonstrated the first dye laser (and the first to provide output from a liquid solution) at IBM's Thomas J. Watson Research Center in Yorktown Heights, New York.
- The augmented target docking adapter (ATDA) arrived at Cape Kennedy. Modifications, testing, and troubleshooting were completed March 4. The ATDA, which was intended to back up the Gemini Agena target vehicle (GATV), was placed in storage until May 17, when the failure of target launch vehicle 5303 prevented GATV 5004 from achieving orbit. The ATDA became the target for Gemini 9A.
- Died:
  - Gilbert Hovey Grosvenor, 90, American publisher who built the National Geographic Society into a worldwide institution through publication of its magazine National Geographic.
  - Sir Lance Brisbane, 72, Australian industrialist

== February 5, 1966 (Saturday) ==
- At the annual four-man bobsled world championships at Cortina D'Ampezzo in Italy, the members of the West German team were injured after their sled failed to negotiate a sharp curve and crashed. The driver, Anton "Toni" Pensperger, never regained consciousness and died of brain and spinal cord injuries at the local hospital. Rider Roland Ebert and brakeman Ludwig Siebert were unconscious, while the fourth teammate, Helmut Werzer, was only slightly hurt.
- The day after Pierre Harmel announced that he would resign as Prime Minister of Belgium because physicians had threatened to go on strike at midnight on Sunday, King Baudouin refused to accept the resignation and explained his reasons in a two-page letter. Harmel would finally step aside six weeks later in favor of Paul Vanden Boeynants.
- Born: José María Olazábal, Spanish golfer; in Hondarribia

== February 6, 1966 (Sunday) ==
- In Oslo, Fred Anton Maier of Norway broke the world record in the men's 10,000 meter speed skating event in a five nation competition. Maier, who completed 10 kilometers in 15 minutes, 32.2 seconds, broke the existing mark, set by Jonny Nilsson of Sweden in 1963, by 0.8 seconds.
- The last original episode of the American TV sitcom Mister Ed was broadcast on CBS. In its first five seasons, from 1961 to 1965, the show about a talking horse had been telecast in the evening. In its final outing, it was moved to Sunday afternoons at 5:00 p.m.
- In elections in Liechtenstein, the Progressive Citizens' Party retained its narrow 8 to 7 seat lead over the Patriotic Union in the 15-member Landtag, as the two parties worked at forming a coalition for the ninth consecutive election in 30 years.
- Born: Rick Astley, English pop music singer known for his 1987 hit song "Never Gonna Give You Up"; in Great Sankey, Cheshire
- Died:
  - Abdurrahman Nafiz Gürman, 84, Turkish general
  - Narcisa de Leon, 88, Filipina film producer

== February 7, 1966 (Monday) ==
- Television was broadcast in South Vietnam for the first time, as the United States Navy used "Stratovision", sending a C-121 Constellation airplane to carry transmitting equipment, videotape machines and a small television studio aloft. The C-121 took off from Saigon, climbed to 10,500 feet (3,200 m), then flew in a slow oval pattern at 170 miles per hour (270 km/h), and, at 7:30 p.m., transmitted the first THVN programs to outdoor television sets that had been tuned to Channel 9; the United States and South Vietnam would set up four ground-based stations in the autumn.
- Paul Williams and other students at Swarthmore College published the first issue of the rock music magazine Crawdaddy!, starting with ten pages of material and 500 copies printed on a mimeograph machine. The publication, which preceded Rolling Stone by almost two years, would develop into a mass market publication lasting through 1979, and being revived by Williams from 1993 to 2003.
- U.S. President Lyndon B. Johnson and Premier Nguyễn Cao Kỳ of South Vietnam convened with other officials in Honolulu, Hawaii, to discuss the course of the Vietnam War.
- Born: Kristin Otto, German Olympic swimming champion who won six gold medals for East Germany in the 1988 Summer Olympics; in Leipzig

== February 8, 1966 (Tuesday) ==
- The Tugu Nagara, Malaysia's National Monument to commemorate the lives of the 11,000 people who died in combat during the Malayan Emergency, was unveiled in a ceremony in near Kuala Lumpur, by Ismail Nasiruddin of Terengganu, the elected monarch (Yang di-Pertuan Agong). The world's tallest bronze freestanding sculpture features seven statues of Malay fighters and has the inscription, "Dedicated to the Heroic Fighters in the Cause of Peace and Freedom— May the Blessing of Allah Be upon Them."
- Died: Paul Sophus Epstein, 82, Russian-American mathematical physicist and pioneer in quantum mechanics

== February 9, 1966 (Wednesday) ==
- Sir John Paul, who had served as the Governor-General of The Gambia since the West African nation's grant of independence from the United Kingdom a year earlier, stepped aside in favor of a Gambian native, Sir Farimang Singateh. Singateh would preside as the Head of State on behalf of Queen Elizabeth II until 1970, when the Gambia would become a republic.
- The Board of Governors of the six-team National Hockey League voted to admit six expansion franchises, out of 18 candidates, for the 1966–1967 season, doubling the NHL's size. The existing teams in Boston, Chicago, Detroit, Montreal, New York, and Toronto, would be joined by clubs at Los Angeles, Minnesota, Philadelphia, Pittsburgh, St. Louis and San Francisco.
- The Dow Jones Industrial Average closed at a record level of 995 points, then gradually declined by more than 25% over the next seven months, closing at 744.32 on October 8.
- Died:
  - Richard Raymond Willis, 89, Royal Army officer and one of six recipients of the Victoria Cross for heroism in the Gallipoli Campaign in 1915
  - Sophie Tucker, 79, Russian-born U.S. singer, comedian, actress, and radio personality

== February 10, 1966 (Thursday) ==
- Valley of the Dolls, by author Jacqueline Susann, was released by publisher Bernard Geis Associates and quickly rose to become the number one best-selling novel. From a friend, Susann had obtained a list of the bookstores upon which The New York Times relied on sales figures to determine its bestseller list. She then used her own money to buy large quantities of the book at these stores, resulting in her novel going to #1 on the list. Valley of the Dolls would go on to rank among the best selling novels of all time.
- Died:
  - Ryan DeGraffenried Sr., 40, American attorney and candidate for the Democratic Party nomination for Governor of Alabama, was killed in a plane crash after making a campaign speech in Fort Payne, Alabama. Despite being warned of high winds, DeGraffenried and pilot Bob Hoskins took off from Fort Payne to fly to Gadsden in a Cessna 310, which crashed into a hillside four minutes later.
  - Major-General J. F. C. Fuller, 87, British Army strategist and military historian

== February 11, 1966 (Friday) ==
- Deputy Mayor Robert Price ordered New York City's "Crash Clean-up Campaign", to be administered by Assistant Commissioner Sidney Davidoff of the city's Department of Buildings. A forty-block area within East New York, Brooklyn (and bounded by Pennsylvania Avenue, Sutter, Van Sinderen and New Lots Avenues) was targeted for urban renewal, and by the end of the campaign, 80 buildings were targeted for demolition. Ultimately, though, inspectors were withdrawn with no followup, "leaving most of the housing in the same condition as it was found".
- Marshall Space Flight Center (MSFC) submitted its response to the call from NASA Headquarters for project management proposals for the Apollo telescope mount (ATM). The plan summarized Marshall's developmental work on ATM-type systems and contained specific technical and managerial concepts for implementing the ATM project.
- The final, deciding Test match in the 1965–66 Ashes series of cricket opened in Melbourne.
- The Soviet Union launched the Kosmos 108 research satellite.
- Born: Dieudonné, French comedian, actor, and political activist; in Fontenay-aux-Roses

== February 12, 1966 (Saturday) ==
- Sheikh Mujibur Rahman, President of the Awami League that represented the Bengali people in the Eastern enclave of the nation of Pakistan, unveiled what he referred to as the Six Point Program for future relations with the Urdu people who predominated in West Pakistan and controlled the national government. Rahman proposed that Pakistan should be a federation of two autonomous sections, with separate currencies, that the national government should be responsible only for Pakistan's defense and foreign affairs, and that the national legislature be an elected body with seats based on proportional representation. The civil disorder between the two sections of Pakistan, located to the east and west of India, when Rahman would declare East Pakistan independent as the nation of Bangladesh in 1971.
- The Tây Vinh Massacre of as many as 168 civilians was carried out, purportedly by the ROK Capital Division of South Korean Army soldiers stationed in South Vietnam, in the Tây Sơn District of Bình Định Province in South Vietnam. During the operation, the Capital Division was reported to have assaulted 15 hamlets and killed over 1,000 civilians. In one hamlet, the ROK soldiers rounded up and shot 68 villagers. Only 3 villagers survived.
- The tradition of "Festivus" was first observed by the father of scriptwriter Dan O'Keefe. O'Keefe would later use the unique family observation as the basis for the December 18, 1997 episode of the popular TV sitcom Seinfeld. The episode proved so popular that "Festivus" would be celebrated by other families as an alternative component to the December holiday season.
- Rabbi Morris Adler, leading conservative rabbi in Detroit (at Shaarey Zedek, Detroit and later Southfield, Michigan), and author of The World of the Talmud, was shot by a member of his congregation while leading Sabbath services. He died 27 days later on March 11, 1966.
- Five members of the Politburo of the Chinese Communist Party, led by Beijing Mayor Peng Zhen, issued a report called the "February Outline", setting recommendations for drastic reforms that would become the Cultural Revolution.

== February 13, 1966 (Sunday) ==
- The Washington Post ran a story headlined "Car Safety Critic Nader Reports Being 'Tailed'", by reporter Morton Mintz, a revelation that would eventually propel consumer advocate Ralph Nader to national fame and turn his recent book Unsafe at Any Speed into a bestseller. Nader's crusade against General Motors had largely been overlooked, until "the company did not recognize the value of public relations and opted instead to use intimidation and harassment to shut down Nader... The result was the media coverage and attention GM had hoped to avoid." Though the Post story ran on page 43, and did not get attention right away, other magazines and newspapers would soon investigate the story and make Nader's name a household word.
- In what one author has described as "the single largest contribution made by drones during the Vietnam War", a Firebee 147E unmanned aircraft with electronic intelligence monitors was sent on a one-way mission to be shot down by the SA-2 antiaircraft radar and missile defense system being used by North Vietnam. The drone was picked up by the radar and destroyed, but not before "finally acquiring the long-mysterious command uplink and downlink signals" that were used in the SA-2 operation, and relaying the data back to a nearby DC-130 transport aircraft; acquisition of the signal led to developing methods to jam it as well.
- The Second Route of Western Australia's Eastern Railway was closed, after almost 70 years of operation.
- The closing ceremony of the 1966 Winter Universiade was held at Sestriere, Italy.

== February 14, 1966 (Monday) ==
- At 12:01 a.m., "C-day" began. The currency of Australia was decimalised, and the Australian dollar was introduced, while the Australian pound would be phased out over two years under the auspices of the Decimal Currency Board. Pound notes were replaced by two-dollar bills, ten-shilling notes by one-dollar notes, and the shilling itself (12 pence) exchanged for a ten-cent piece. The sixpence and the new five cent piece were interchangeable. The nation's banks, which had been closed since February 9, began the exchange of monies upon opening Monday morning.
- Soviet writers Yuli Daniel and Andrei Sinyavsky were convicted of authoring "anti-Soviet" books and sentenced to five and seven years hard labour, respectively. Under the pen-name "Nikolai Arzhak", Daniel had written the story "Moscow Calling", which Judge Lev Smirnov concluded to be intentionally malicious. Judge Smirnov described Sinyavsky's "What Is Socialist Realism?" (written under the name "Abram Tertz") as "a mockery of the ideas of communist construction".
- A railway accident killed 23 people, and injured 30, when the train they were in derailed after departing the town of Shwe Nyaung in northeast Burma and sent seven coaches into a deep ravine.

== February 15, 1966 (Tuesday) ==
- Poisoning killed 17 people in a tunnel near Locarno, Switzerland, when a drilling crew pierced a pocket of lethal underground gas. Of the group, 15 were part of an Italian crew working on the project for a hydroelectric plant, and two others were firemen from Locarno who were part of a rescue team.
- The United Arab Republic (Egypt) indicted 45 members of the Muslim Brotherhood, accused of plotting to overthrow Abdel Nasser.
- Mansur al-Atrash was re-elected speaker of Syria's National Council for the Revolutionary Command.
- John T. Hayward became President of the Naval War College at Newport, Rhode Island.

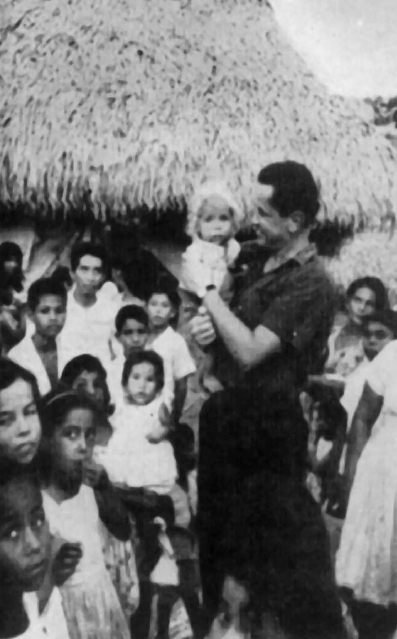
Torres (center)

- Died: Camilo Torres Restrepo, 37, Colombian guerrilla leader who had renounced his position as a Roman Catholic priest in order to join the rebel National Liberation Army (ELN) to fight the government. Torres was killed in a skirmish with the Colombian military near Bucaramanga, but his philosophy of a "Christian Revolution" would inspire other people in Colombia.

== February 16, 1966 (Wednesday) ==
- One week before Ash Wednesday, Pope Paul VI issued the apostolic constitution Paenitemini, revising obligations for Roman Catholic Church adherents for Lent. The age at which abstinence was required was raised to 14 years old, and the number of universal days of fasting days was reduced from 40 days to only two (Ash Wednesday and Good Friday), and the days of obligatory abstinence to eight (Ash Wednesday, Good Friday, and the Fridays in between).
- A pair of bombs killed 36 people and injured 53, after having been placed on an express train in the Indian state of Assam. According to Railways Minister Ram Sabhag Singh, the train had been halted when a time bomb exploded in the rear compartment of a coach with passengers inside. An hour later, while the victims were still being removed, a second bomb exploded in the front of the train, killing rescue workers and more passengers.
- The 20th and final nuclear explosion in Algeria was conducted in the desert in a test by France, near the village of In Eker. Afterwards, until January 27, 1996, all French tests would take place at locations in the South Pacific Ocean, primarily at the atolls of Moruroa and Fangataufa.
- A commuter train crash killed 29 people, and injured 27, as they approached the Yugoslavian city of Split (now in Croatia). The passenger train was impacted by a 19-car coal train that had been descending a steep grade when its brakes failed.
- J. Carlyle Sitterson became Chancellor of the University of North Carolina at Chapel Hill.
- A coal miner explosion killed 16 workers near Kamp-Lintfort, West Germany.
- Born: Amy Acton, American politician and physician, Governor-elect of Ohio, in Youngstown, Ohio

== February 17, 1966 (Thursday) ==
- A crash killed 21 of the 48 people on Aeroflot Flight 65 when the airliner was taking off from Sheremetyevo International Airport near Moscow. A wing of the Soviet Tupolev Tu-114 turboprop airliner struck a snowbank while accelerating down the runway, which had not been cleared of snow adequately. Reportedly, the plane— which was inaugurating the first Aeroflot service to Brazzaville in the former French Congo— reached an altitude of 100 feet (30 m) before coming down, and the cabin broke in two. The crash was the first fatal accident involving the Tu-144.
- The draft classification of world heavyweight boxing champion Muhammad Ali was reclassified from 1-Y (unfit for military service) to 1-A, after the armed services revised standards from accepting only the upper 15th percentile of IQ to the upper 30th percentile. The revision would lead to Ali's refusal to register on religious beliefs, his arrest, and the loss of his championship status.
- A spokesman for Secretary-General U Thant presented the "Three-point Proposal" for ending the Vietnam War at the United Nations headquarters in New York, calling for cessation of bombing of North Vietnam by the United States, a scaling down of military activities, and an agreement by all sides to enter into discussions with representatives of the Viet Cong.
- Reg Withers entered the Australian Senate, filling the vacancy caused by the death of Senator Sir Shane Paltridge. In the Australian House of Representatives, Joe Clark became Father of the House, and would go on to be the tenth longest-serving member of the House of Representatives.
- At Geneva, representatives from Venezuela and the United Kingdom signed a treaty to delineate the boundary between Venezuela and British Guiana (now Guyana).
- Testifying before a subcommittee of the U.S. House Committee on Science and Astronautics, NASA Deputy Associate Administrator for Space Science and Applications Edgar M. Cortright, stressed selectivity in planning the space science program, with a focus on astronomy, observing Earth with various detectors to find natural resources, and evaluating the effects of long-duration weightlessness flight. Cortright added "and of course continued lunar exploration." The next day, NASA Deputy Administrator Robert C. Seamans, Jr. testified before the same subcommittee about the main goals of the Apollo Applications Program, emphasizing extension of orbital missions to 45 days or more through minor modifications of the Apollos spacecraft; Procurement of additional spacecraft and launch vehicles to extend the present Apollo schedule; and using Apollo vehicles after the scheduled lunar missions were completed. Seamans added that "We cannot today look toward a permanent manned space station, or a lunar base, or projects for manned planetary exploration until our operational, scientific and technological experience with major manned systems already in hand has further matured."
- Died:
  - Alfred P. Sloan, 90, American automotive executive who served as Chairman of the Board of General Motors Corporation from 1937 to 1956.
  - Hans Hofmann, 85, German-born American abstract expressionist painter

== February 18, 1966 (Friday) ==
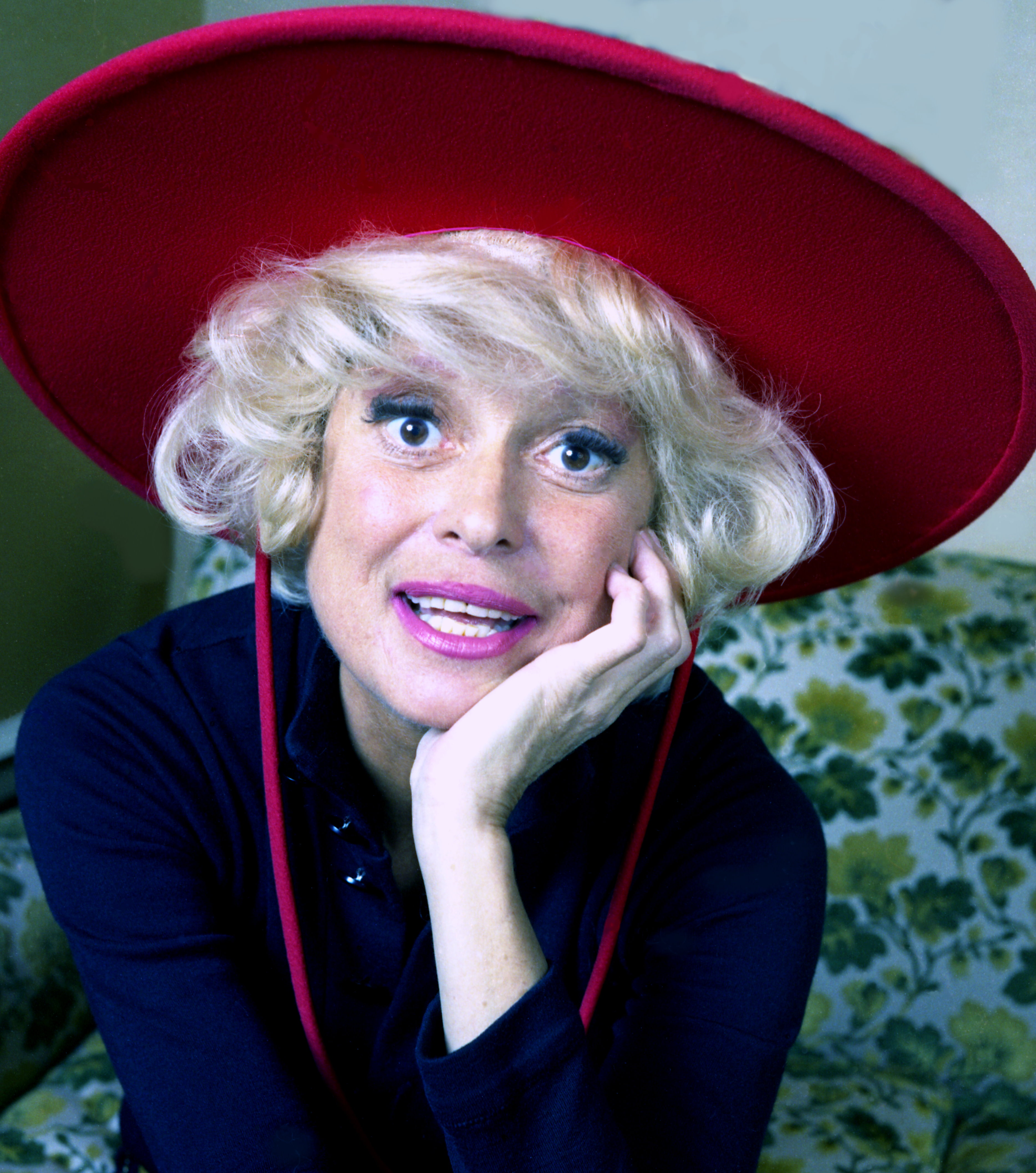
Channing

- In an attempt to give an artificial boost to the Nielsen ratings for a sweeps month, by cheating on the rating reports for a television presentation of An Evening with Carol Channing, Rex Sparger conspired with Channing's husband, producer Charles Lowe, to pay viewers in 58 households in Ohio and Pennsylvania to watch the entire program. The Nielsen company's screening procedures detected the unusual spike of viewers in those locations, and omitted the areas from its sample that evening. Nielsen would file a $1,500,000 lawsuit against Sparger on March 24, which would be settled after Sparger signed a consent order conceding his attempt to distort the ratings. Sparger would reveal that he had found out the identities of contractors who serviced the meters placed on television sets, then followed them as they called on the sample homes.
- The consulate of the People's Republic of China in Phong Saly, Laos, was heavily strafed by gunfire, and the Beijing government charged that four American fighter jets had attacked "with more than 600 bullets", as well as dropping eight bombs to the east of the city, which was 20 miles (32 km) from the border with China.
- A bus accident killed 22 people and seriously injured 23, when the vehicle ran off of a 70-foot (21 m) high cliff outside the seaside town of Ye in Burma. Burmese officials reported that the steering rod had snapped as the bus was driving on a curving mountain road.
- Born: Phillip DeFreitas, England cricketer; in Scotts Head, Dominica
- Died: Grigori Nelyubov, 31, one of the twenty original Soviet cosmonauts, after being struck by a train in an apparent suicide attempt. Nelyubov and two other cosmonauts had been dismissed from the Soviet space program after getting into a fight with military guards on March 27, 1963.

== February 19, 1966 (Saturday) ==
- U.S. Senator Robert F. Kennedy became the first member of the Senate to break with President Johnson in proposing that the Viet Cong be allowed "a share of power and responsibility" in peace talks with the United States. "There are three things you can do with such groups," Kennedy said in a speech, "Kill or repress them, turn the country over to them, or admit them to a share of power."
- Britain's Navy Minister, Parliamentary Under-Secretary of State for Defence Christopher Mayhew, and the First Sea Lord, Sir David Luce, resigned in protest after the government's decision to shift British airpower from carrier-based planes to land-based planes and to cancel the CVA-01 aircraft carrier programme.
- The Central Committee of the Communist Party of the Soviet Union approved the Eighth Five-Year Plan, proposed by Premier Alexei Kosygin.
- Born: Justine Bateman, American actress and filmmaker; in Rye, New York

== February 20, 1966 (Sunday) ==
- The Norwegian oil tanker Anne Mildred Brovig collided with the British coaster MV Pentland off of the coast of West Germany near Heligoland. Both ships caught fire and the Brovig sank, spilling 16,000 tons of its cargo of Iranian crude oil, the last major spill to threaten Germany. Between the use of dispersants and favorable weather, the oil slick disappeared without damaging the German coast.
- After the injection of contaminated waste water into the mountains of the Rocky Mountain Arsenal caused earthquakes in Denver, Colorado, the program was halted. Tremors had started one month after the first injection on March 8, 1962, then halted temporarily after a cessation of the process.
- Emmett Ashford became the first African-American Major League Baseball umpire, hired by the American League after 15 years of umpiring in the minor leagues.
- The Soviet Union revoked the citizenship of Soviet author Valery Tarsis, who had emigrated to the United Kingdom two weeks earlier.
- Cecilia Cummins was born in Richmond, North Yorkshire, the fifth child of the Cummins family to have a February 20 birthday since 1952, a coincidence that has been noted in the Guinness Book Of World Records since 1977 under the category "Most siblings born on the same day". The book noted that the odds were one in 17,797,577,730. Her arrival coincided with the birthdays of her sisters Catherine (14), Carol (13), Claudia (5) and her brother Charles (10).
- Born: Cindy Crawford, American model and actress; in DeKalb, Illinois
- Died: Chester Nimitz, 80, U.S. Fleet Admiral who commanded the Pacific Fleet in World War II, and later Chief of Naval Operations

== February 21, 1966 (Monday) ==
- President Sukarno of Indonesia "reshuffled" his cabinet, starting with the removal of his Defense Minister, Abdul Haris Nasution, appointing enough sympathizers to create what was called the "Cabinet of 100 Ministers". Dismissing advisers who opposed the Communist Party of Indonesia (PKI) and replacing them with PKI sympathizers, he fired seven of his nine State Ministers, the Commanders of the Navy and the Army, and reassigned others in order to reduce the generals' authority. Within less than three weeks, he would be forced to hand over his executive authority to General Suharto.
- In a televised press conference, French President Charles de Gaulle said that France would require command of all foreign troops and military institutions in France when the NATO agreement expired on April 4, 1969. Soon afterward, De Gaulle would announce that France would withdraw on July 1, and that he wanted the troops, officers and bases of the United States and United Kingdom removed by April 1, 1967.
- The Senate Foreign Relations Committee approved Jack Hood Vaughn as Director of the Peace Corps, and Lincoln Gordon to replace him as Assistant Secretary of State for Inter-American Affairs. Senator Wayne Morse of Oregon cast the only dissenting vote. The Committee unanimously approved U.S. participation in the Asian Development Bank.
- Syria's Minister of Defence Muhammad Umran ordered the transfer of three key supporters of army chief Salah Jadid, Major-General Ahmad Suwaydani, Colonel Izzad Jadid and Major Salim Hatum.

== February 22, 1966 (Tuesday) ==
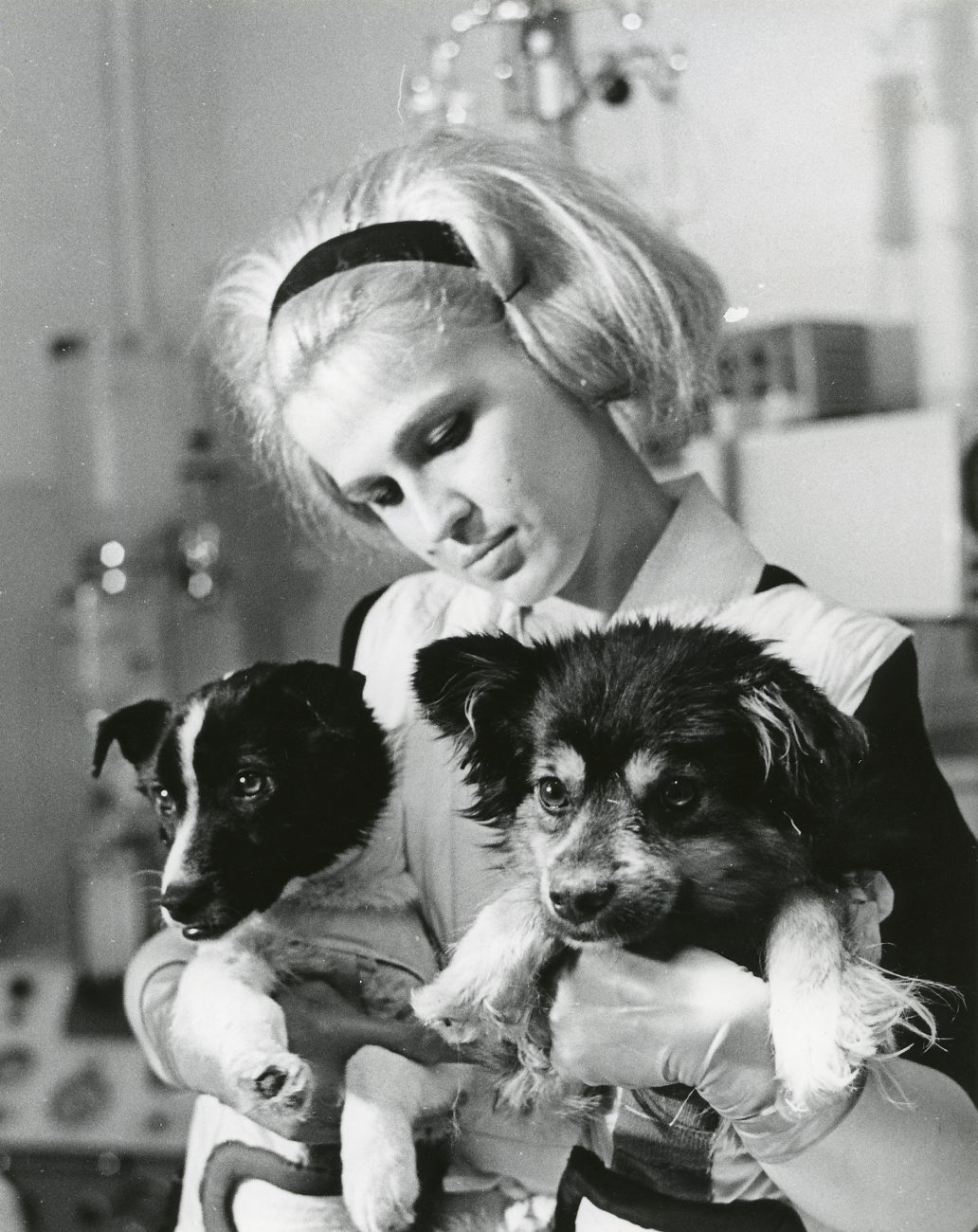
Veterok and Ugolyok

- The Soviet Union launched two dogs, "Veterok" and "Ugolyok" (translated in the American press as "Breezy" and "Blackie", respectively) into orbit around the Earth on board the satellite Kosmos 110. The two dogs would remain in orbit for 22 days and then safely return to Earth on March 16.
- Milton Obote, the Prime Minister of Uganda, called for a meeting of his cabinet. After discussions started, he called in soldiers and then placed five of the group (State Minister Grace Ibingira, Agriculture Minister Mathias Ngobi, Health Minister Emmanuel Lumu, Minister of Works Balaki Kirya and Labour Minister George Magezi) under arrest on grounds that they had been "conspiring to overthrow the Government by violent means".
- The Broadway production of Slapstick Tragedy: Two Plays by Tennessee Williams premiered at the Longacre Theatre. Despite Williams's success with productions such as The Glass Menagerie, A Streetcar Named Desire and Cat on a Hot Tin Roof, the double-bill of plays (The Mutilated and The Gnädiges Fräulein) would close after only seven performances.
- British Prime Minister Harold Wilson announced that the United Kingdom would withdraw its troops from the Aden Protectorate by 1968, endorsing the "Defence White Paper" that stated "we do not think it appropriate that we should maintain defence facilities there" after independence was granted.
- The 1966 Australian Grand Prix was held at Lakeside International Raceway and was won by Graham Hill.

== February 23, 1966 (Wednesday) ==
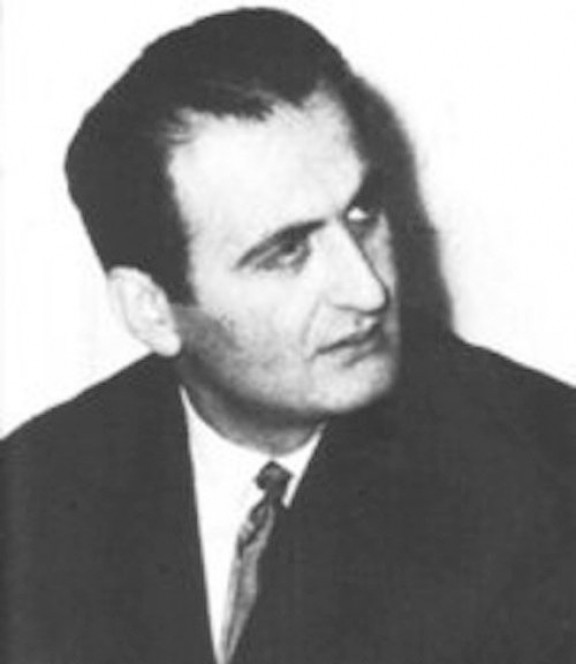
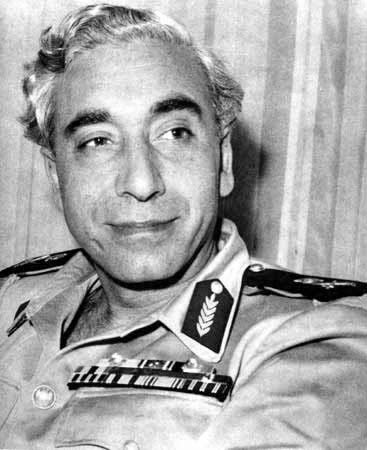
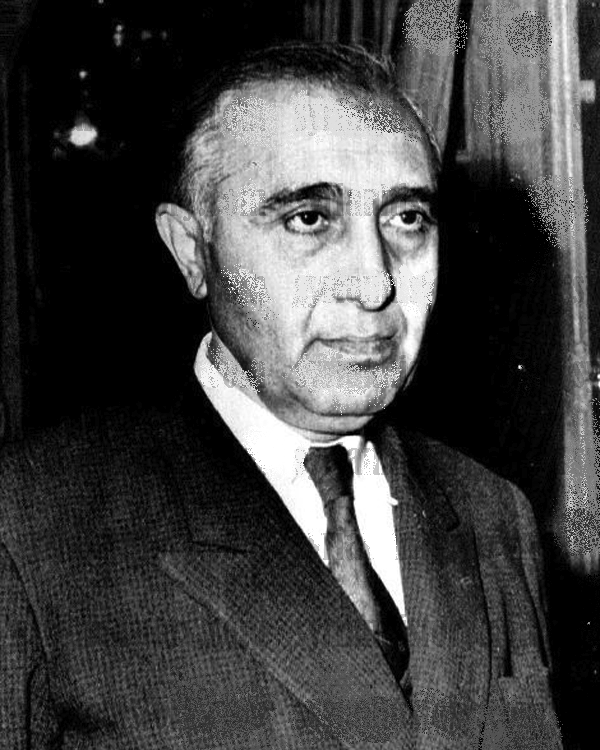
February 23, 1966: Syria's General Jadid arrests President al-Hafiz and Premier al-Bitar
- Major General Salah Jadid launched a coup d'état, arresting President Amin al-Hafiz, Prime Minister Salah al-Din al-Bitar, Speaker of Parliament Mansour Attrish, and the Defense Minister, Major General Mohammed Omran. Major General Jedid had been leader of the extremist faction of the Ba'ath Party until a purge in December. A future President, Air Force General Hafez al-Assad, was named as the new Defense Minister. Hafiz's private residence was attacked by troops led by Salim Hatum and Rifaat al-Assad. Jadid appointed Nureddin al-Atassi as the new figurehead President, and Yusuf Zu'ayyin was restored to office as Prime Minister.

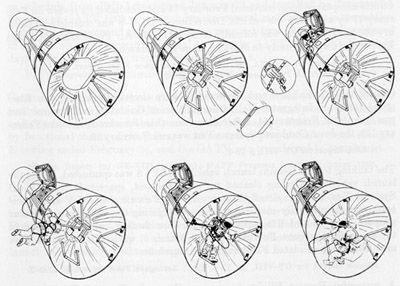
Method of donning the Astronaut Maneuvering Unit

- The astronaut maneuvering unit (AMU), scheduled to be tested on the Gemini 9 mission, was delivered to Cape Kennedy. Inspection of the AMU revealed nitrogen leaks in the propulsion system and oxygen leaks in the oxygen supply system. Reworking these systems to eliminate the leakage was completed on March 11. Following systems tests, the AMU was installed in spacecraft No. 9 (March 14–18).
- Isaac Adaka Boro, leader of the rebel Ijaw Volunteer Force, captured the city of Yenagoa with a force of 159 youths, then declared the independence of the short-lived Niger Delta People's Republic; the Republic lasted only 12 days before police arrived from Lagos and arrested the rebels.
- A British Defence White Paper, recommending withdrawal of British presence in Aden, was published.
- The two-day Gemini Midprogram Conference of over 600 representatives of U.S. Government agencies and industrial firms involved with in Project Gemini was held at the Manned Spacecraft Center. The group heard 44 papers describing the development of spacecraft and launch vehicle, flight operations, and the results of the first seven Gemini missions, including the findings of experiments performed during these missions.

== February 24, 1966 (Thursday) ==
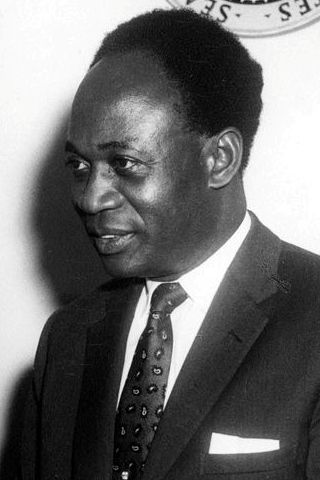
Former President for life Nkrumah

- A military coup in Ghana overthrew President for life Kwame Nkrumah while he was making a state visit to Beijing. Former Major General Joseph A. Ankrah, who had been fired the year before by Nkrumah, was named as the leader of the seven-man National Liberation Council that took control of the government. Across Ghana, enthusiastic crowds tore down statues that Nkrumah had erected for himself as "Redeemer of the Nation". Declassified CIA and U.S. State Department documents, released in 2001, would show that the U.S., the UK and France provided the funding to the coup leaders. Ankrah would be forced to resign on April 3, 1969, after being charged with corruption.
- Two days after arresting cabinet members, Uganda's Prime Minister Milton Obote fired Sir Edward Mutesa and took over as the new President of Uganda.
- Student protesters outside of the presidential palace in Jakarta were killed when Indonesian President Sukarno's guards fired into the crowd.
- Born: Billy Zane, American film actor; in Chicago

== February 25, 1966 (Friday) ==
- Pursuant to the peace agreement signed by both nations on January 10 in Tashkent, India and Pakistan completed their troop withdrawals from the disputed territory, returning to the locations that they had occupied as of August 5, 1965, prior to the beginning of the Indo-Pakistani War of 1965. The last Indian troops left at sunset.
- Maurice J. Raffensperger, NASA's Director of Manned Earth Orbital Mission Studies, summarized the agreements between the U.S. government and the NASA centers regarding the S-IVB Workshop project, later called "Skylab". MSFC had overall responsibility for the Workshop system design and integration for a mission of up to 30 days. The Gemini office at MSC was responsible for the airlock module, using basic Gemini components where feasible, and would manage the CSM portion of the Workshop concept. MSFC was responsible for implementing the S-IVB Workshop experiment program and integrating experiments into the Workshop.
- Born: Téa Leoni, American television and film actress; in New York City

== February 26, 1966 (Saturday) ==
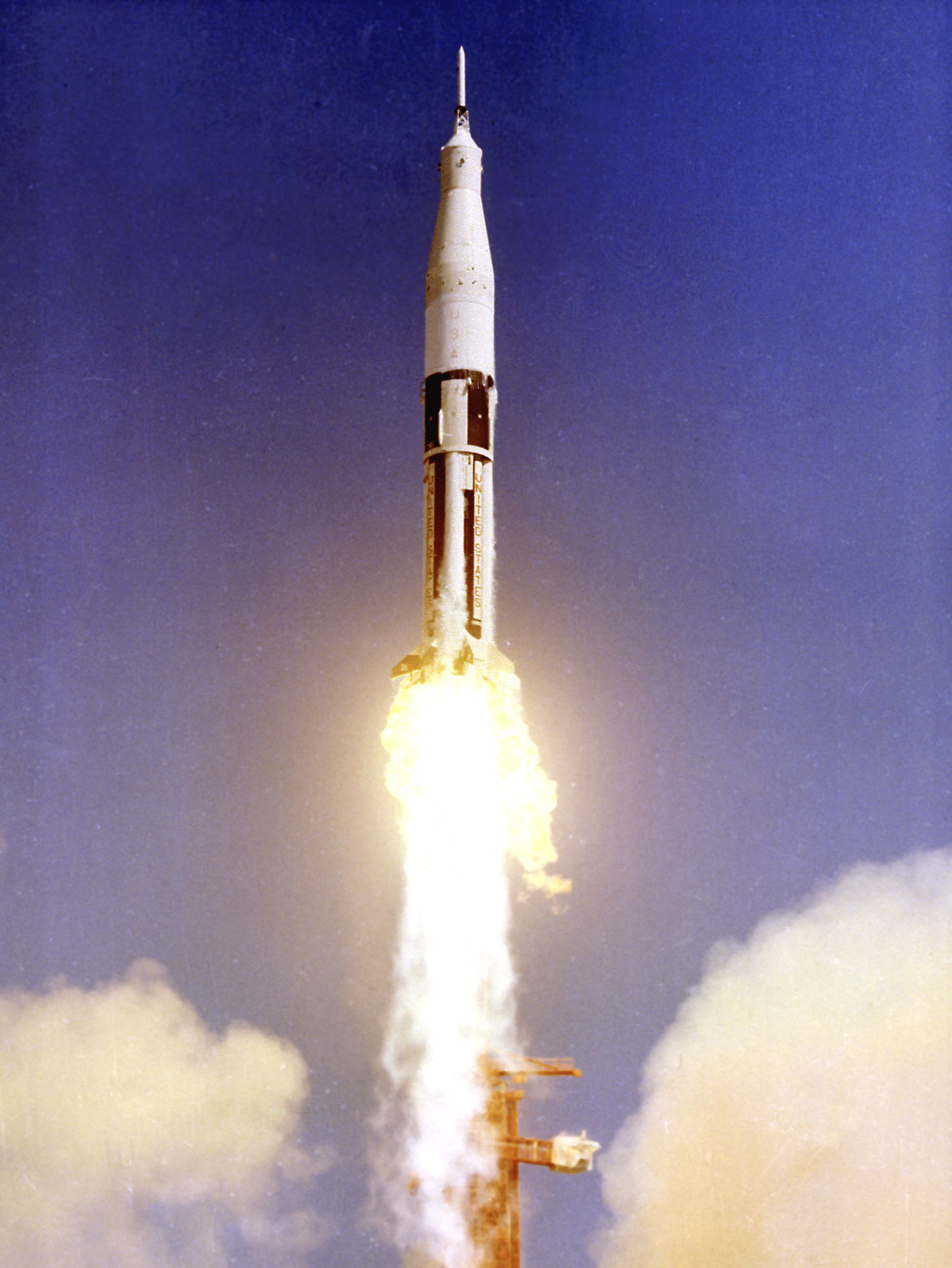
February 26, 1966: Launch of AS-201

- AS-201, the first test flight of the Saturn IB rocket and of the Apollo capsule, was successful. The uncrewed spacecraft was sent 310 miles (500 km) into space, and the capsule's heat shields withstood 5,000 °F (2,760 °C) of heat during re-entry through the Earth's atmosphere. The aircraft carrier USS Boxer recovered the vehicle in the South Atlantic Ocean, 38 miles (61 km) from Ascension Island.
- The Soviet Union made its first test of an intercontinental ballistic missile referred to by them as the RT-2, and in the United States as the SS-13 Savage, but the launch was unsuccessful. A liftoff would be achieved on November 4 "and even then its warhead disintegrated on reentry".
- Andrew Brimmer became the first African-American to be appointed a governor of the Federal Reserve System. He would remain with "the Fed" until 1974, then serve again in the 1990s as Vice-Chairman.
- In South Vietnam, South Korean soldiers allegedly killed 380 villagers in the Bình An commune (today known as xã Tây Vinh) in the Tây Sơn District of Bình Định Province.
- As the Cultural Revolution progressed, China's television stations were ordered to broadcast model plays (Yang Ban Xi) as the sole entertainment.
- Born:
  - Jennifer Grant, American television actress (Beverly Hills 90210); in Burbank, California, to actors Cary Grant and Dyan Cannon
  - Najwa Karam, Lebanese singer; in Zahlé
- Died: Vinayak Damodar Savarkar, 82, Indian pro-independence activist, politician, poet and playwright

== February 27, 1966 (Sunday) ==
- In elections for Bulgaria's parliament, all 416 candidates of the Fatherland Front won election without opposition. Of those, 280 were members of the Bulgarian Communist Party and 99 from the affiliated Bulgarian National Agrarian Union. In the yes/no vote, the slate won overwhelming approval, with a reported 5,744,072 yes votes and 2,089 against them. The turnout was said to have been 99.6 percent. Prime Minister Todor Zhivkov, General Secretary of the BCP, continued in office as Prime Minister.
- Pu Laldenga and other leaders of the Mizo National Front (MNF) planned an uprising in India to take place on March 1.
- Born: Bill Oakley, American television writer and producer, known for his work on the animated comedy series The Simpsons; in Westminster, Maryland

== February 28, 1966 (Monday) ==
- American astronauts Elliot M. See, Jr., 38, and Charles A. Bassett II, 34, were killed in an aircraft accident in St. Louis, Missouri, during training for the Gemini program. See and Bassett, who had been scheduled to travel into space on Gemini 9 in May 1966, died when their Northrop T-38 Talon jet training plane crashed in rain and fog short of the St. Louis Municipal Airport. The jet, which had been cleared for an instrument landing, was left of center in its approach to the runway when it turned toward the McDonnell Aircraft complex, 1,000 feet (300 m) from the landing strip. It hit the roof of the three-story building where Gemini spacecraft nos. 9 and 10 were being housed, bounced into an adjacent courtyard, and exploded. Several McDonnell employees were slightly injured. Minutes later the Gemini 9 backup astronauts, Thomas P. Stafford and Eugene A. Cernan, who had been flying behind See and Bassett in another T-38 plane, landed safely. The four astronauts were en route to McDonnell for two weeks' training in the simulator. NASA Headquarters announced that Stafford and Cernan would fly the Gemini 9 mission on schedule and appointed Alan B. Shepard, Jr., to head a seven-man investigating team.
- Dr. Rolando Cubela Secades was arrested in Havana, Cuba, along with a fellow Cuban Army Major, Ramon Guin, on charges that they were agents for the U.S. Central Intelligence Agency who were plotting to assassinate Fidel Castro, Cuba's Prime Minister. A CIA report, dated April 25, 1967, and declassified in 1997, would confirm that Cubela had been contacted on numerous occasions with different plans for a Castro assassination. After serving 13 years of a 25-year prison sentence, Cubela would be pardoned by Castro on August 27, 1979, and allowed to leave Cuba.
- During a stormy meeting with Davis Hughes, Minister for Public Works of New South Wales, Danish architect Jørn Utzon, designer of the Sydney Opera House, withdrew from the project due to non-payment of fees.
- At the 23rd Golden Globe Awards, the winning films were Doctor Zhivago for best drama and The Sound of Music for best musical. The Man from U.N.C.L.E. won for best TV show.
- Mannathu Padmanabha Pillai laid the foundation stone for NSS College, Nenmara in Nemmara, Palakkad district, Kerala, India.
- With the National Liberation Council now in control of Ghana after the coup on February 24, the original Flag of Ghana was reinstated.
- Israeli peace activist Abie Nathan flew his airplane, Shalom 1, from Israel to Port Said, Egypt, where he was arrested.
- Emperor of Ethiopia Haile Selassie opened an Organization of African Unity meeting of foreign ministers.
- British Prime Minister Harold Wilson called a General Election in the United Kingdom, to be held on 31 March.
- Eugène Ionesco's play Hunger and Thirst received its world premiere at the Comédie-Française in Paris.
- The Oregon State Highway Department completed construction of the Marquam Bridge in Portland.
- South Pacific Airlines of New Zealand ceased operations.
- The Grand Ducal Guard of Luxembourg was officially disbanded.
- Born:
  - Paulo Futre, Portuguese footballer with 41 caps for the Portugal national team; in Montijo
  - Elbert "Ickey" Woods, American NFL running back known primarily for the "Ickey Shuffle" dance that led to an NFL rule penalizing excessive celebrations of scores; in Fresno, California
  - Edward Shearmur, British film score composer known for the music of Jakob the Liar and the Diary of a Wimpy Kid film series; in London
  - Jovan Vraniškovski, Macedonian Orthodox Church cleric and Archbishop of Ohrid, 2002 to 2023; in Bitola, Socialist Federal Republic of Yugoslavia
  - U.S. Army Lt. Col. (ret.) John Nagl, military strategist for the Center for a New American Security and expert in counterinsurgency; in Vallejo, California
  - Prince Saud bin Muhammed Al Thani, Qatar Minister of Culture, Arts and Heritage and art collector (d. 2014)
  - Mike Jones, American freestyle motocross competitor, gold medalist in the 2001 Winter X Games; in Pittsburgh
  - Vincent Askew, American pro basketball player and twice winner of the Continental Basketball Association MVP Award (1990 and 1991); in Memphis, Tennessee
  - Philip Reeve, British children's author and illustrator known for the Carnegie Medal-winning novel Here Lies Arthur; in Brighton, Sussex
  - Éric Dubus, French middle-distance runner, 1990 European Indoor Championships gold medalist in the 3000m; in Pézenas, Hérault département
  - Christopher C. Cummins, American inorganic chemist and 2013 Ludwig Mond Award winner; in Boston
- Born:
  - Robert Rowland, British politician who served six months in the European Parliament; in Bowdon, Greater Manchester (drowned in diving accident, 2021)
  - Scott Fountain, American assistant football coach; in East Brewton, Alabama
  - Dan Weiss, American-born Japanese basketball player; in San Jose, California
  - Roar Hansen, Swedish association football manager; in Stidsvig
  - Paul Groves, English footballer and coach; in Derby, Derbyshire
  - Tim Goad, American NFL player; in Claudville, Virginia
  - Ndue Paluca, Albanian politician; in Qafë-Mali, Pukë
  - Abdallah Chikota, Tanzanian politician
- Died:
  - Jonathan Hale, 74, Canadian-born film and television actor, shot himself.
  - Léonie Keingiaert de Gheluvelt, 80, Belgian feminist and pioneering woman mayor
  - Schamyl Bauman, 72, Swedish film director
