= January 1966 =

Month of 1966

<<	January 1966					>>
Su	Mo	Tu	We	Th	Fr	Sa
						1
2	3	4	5	6	7	8
9	10	11	12	13	14	15
16	17	18	19	20	21	22
23	24	25	26	27	28	29
30	31

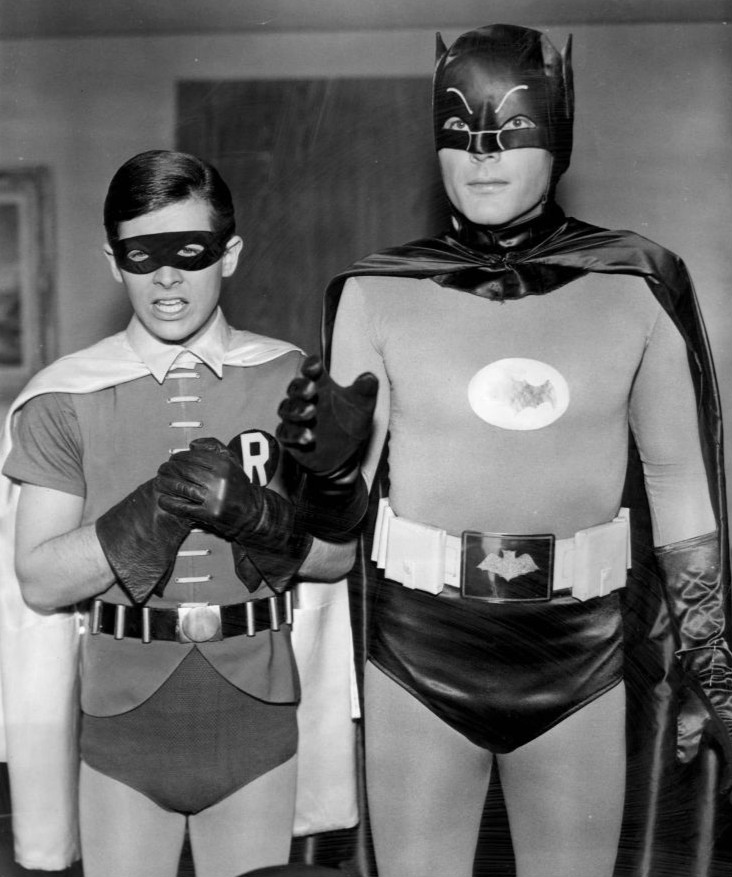
January 12, 1966: ABC brings camp humor Batman to television

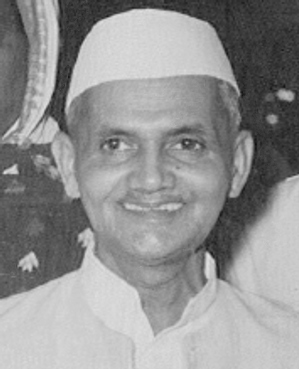
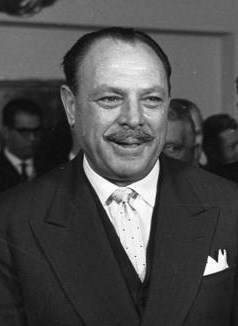
January 10, 1966: India's Lal Bahadur Shastri and Pakistan's Muhammed Ayub Khan agree to peace; Shastri dies the next day

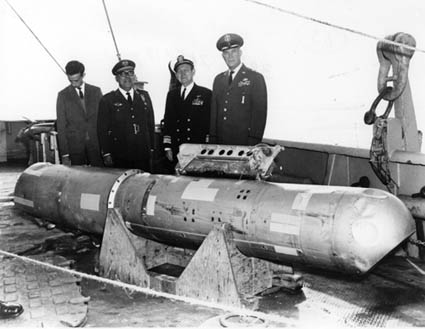
January 17, 1966: Three hydrogen bombs accidentally dropped on Spain

The following events occurred in January 1966: 9108132284

== January 1, 1966 (Saturday) ==
- In college football, the #1 Michigan State Spartans were upset by the #5 UCLA Bruins, 14–12, in the Rose Bowl, and the #2 Arkansas Razorbacks were toppled, 14–7, by the unranked LSU Tigers in the Cotton Bowl, setting up that evening's Orange Bowl game between the #3 Nebraska Cornhuskers and the #4 Alabama Crimson Tide as the game that was likely to determine the unofficial national champion in the final poll of the season. Alabama won convincingly, 39–28, and would be voted #1 in the final Associated Press poll of sportswriters.
- A strike of the 36,000 public transportation workers in New York City began at 5:00 in the morning, as the New York City Transit Authority's subway trains and buses halted service. It was the first time in the city's history that the commuters were without either bus or subway service at the same time, and the full effect would be felt on Monday morning, when six million people would have to find alternate transportation.
- A military coup brought Colonel Jean-Bédel Bokassa into power in the Central African Republic, ousting President David Dacko. Bokassa would name himself as president on January 4, and crown himself as Emperor Bokassa I of the Central African Empire on December 4, 1977. Captain Alexandre Banza, the co-leader of the coup, would be accused of treason and executed by Bokassa in 1969.
- Two separate Garuda Airlines DC-3 airplanes took off from Jakarta, Indonesia, both due to make their first stop at the island of Sumatra at Palembang, but neither arrived. The wreckage of the first plane was spotted from the air in a jungle, 63 miles (101 km) south of Palembang, but the other was not found. In all, 34 people died in the crashes.
- In the Soviet Union, an Aeroflot twin-engine Avia 14 en route from the east coast city of Magadan to Petropavlovsk-Kamchatsky, crashed into a mountain on the Kamchatka Peninsula after engine trouble and icing on the wings caused it to lose altitude.
- NASA Associate Administrator Homer E. Newell announced a chance for astronomers to contribute to the design of instruments to be flown on Apollo and Skylab missions, including the Apollo Telescope Mount.
- The New Zealand Australia Free Trade Agreement came into force. It would be superseded in 1983 by the new Australia New Zealand Closer Economic Relations Trade Agreement.
- Died: Vincent Auriol, 81, President of France from 1947 to 1954

== January 2, 1966 (Sunday) ==
- Cuban premier Fidel Castro announced that his nation's trade agreement with the People's Republic of China, wherein Cuba imported Chinese rice and China purchased Cuban sugar, had been terminated by the Chinese.
- The Green Bay Packers won the NFL Championship at home, beating the Cleveland Browns, 23–12.
- Died: Dino Alfieri, 79, the former Italian Minister of People's Culture in the government of Benito Mussolini

== January 3, 1966 (Monday) ==
- The Atlantic Richfield Company, which became the 10th most productive oil company in the United States, was created as stockholders of both the Atlantic Refining Company and the Richfield Oil Corporation approved a merger after Atlantic was granted authority by the U.S. Department of Justice to purchase $575,000,000 for Richfield's stock. Atlantic Richfield would continue to market gasoline under Atlantic Refining's brand name, ARCO.
- In the Republic of Upper Volta, Major General Sangoulé Lamizana, the Chief of the Armed Forces General Staff, led a coup d'état that overthrew the government of President Maurice Yaméogo. General Lamizana would rule the West African nation (now called Burkina Faso) for almost 15 years, until being overthrown himself in a coup on November 25, 1980.

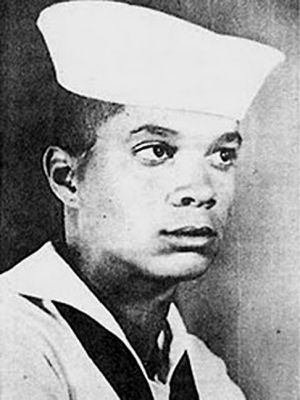
Sammy Younge

- Died:
  - Sammy Younge Jr., 21, American civil rights and voting rights activist, was shot and killed during an argument with the night manager of a Standard Oil gas station in Tuskegee, Alabama, after the manager had told Younge that the station's restroom was for white people only. Younge, an SNCC activist at Tuskegee Institute, known for his successful 1965 integration of the city's swimming pool, was shot in the face with a .38 caliber pistol by station manager Marvin S. Segrest.
  - Marguerite Higgins, 45, Pulitzer Prize-winning war correspondent who had covered both World War II and the Korean War. Ms. Higgins had been hospitalized since November, because of complications from an illness caused by a parasite contracted during a trip to the war zone in South Vietnam.
  - USAF General Irving L. Branch, 53, was killed in the crash of a Northrop T-38 Talon that plunged into Puget Sound

== January 4, 1966 (Tuesday) ==
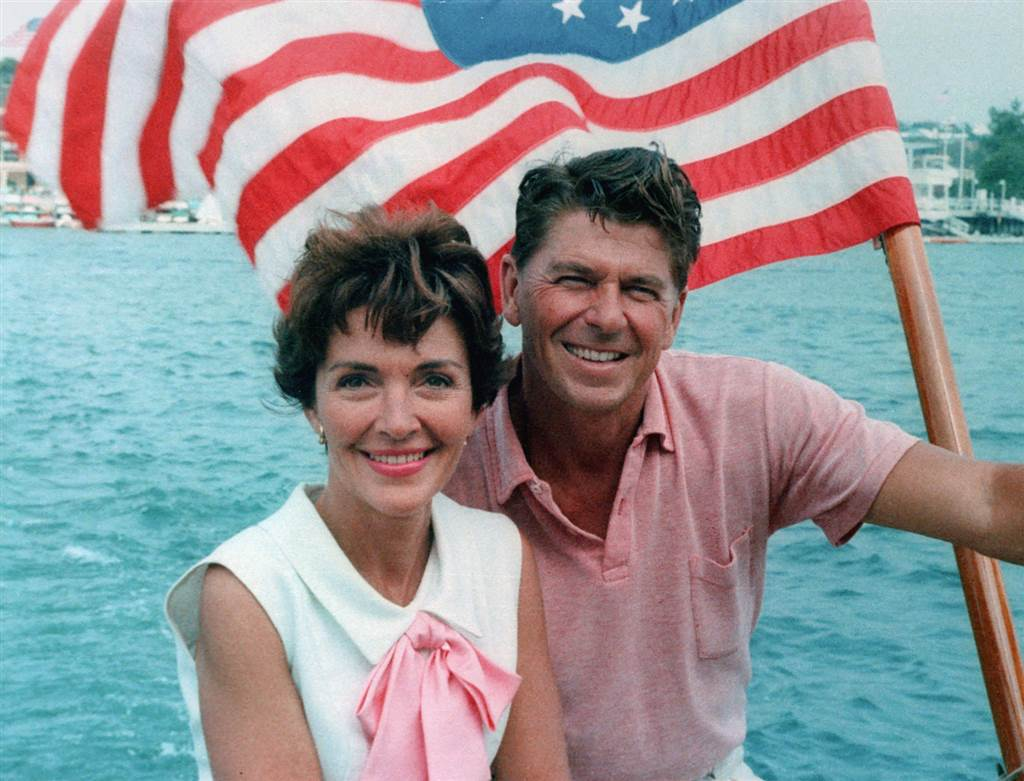
Ronald and Nancy Reagan

- Film and television actor Ronald Reagan announced that he would seek the Republican nomination for Governor of California in order to challenge incumbent Governor Pat Brown. Reagan purchased air time on 15 television stations throughout California in order to broadcast his half-hour taped announcement. At the time, the future President of the United States was still hosting the television show Death Valley Days.
- The Alabama Crimson Tide received the mythical national championship of college football after receiving 37 first place votes in the postseason poll of 57 sportswriters, and 537 points overall, while the Michigan State Spartans, who had been #1 until their being upset in the Rose Bowl, finished second with 18 first place votes and 479 points overall.
- India's Prime Minister Lal Bahadur Shastri and Pakistan's President Ayub Khan met in Tashkent, the Uzbek capital, at the time a part of the Soviet Union, for a conference arranged by Soviet Prime Minister Alexei Kosygin, aimed at arriving at an agreement to end the Indo-Pakistani War of 1965.
- The St. John's University strike of 1966–67 began in New York City; it would last for over a year.
- A gas leak fire at an oil refinery in Feyzin, near Lyon, France, killed 18 people and injured 84.
- Born: Christian Kern, Chancellor of Austria from 2016 to 2017; in Vienna

== January 5, 1966 (Wednesday) ==
- Bobby Baker, who had been a chief adviser to Lyndon Johnson when the President had been the Majority Leader in the U.S. Senate, was indicted by a federal grand jury for theft, tax evasion, and misappropriation of about $100,000 in contributions to Johnson's political campaigns. The U.S. Justice Department investigation of Baker had started in late 1963, when Johnson had been vice-president, but had halted following the Kennedy assassination elevated Johnson to the presidency and was not renewed until Johnson's election campaign in 1964. Baker would not be convicted until five years later, after Johnson had left office.
- Because of the poor quality of the sound recording of their August 15 concert at Shea Stadium, The Beatles went into a studio and re-recorded most of their songs for dubbing in a TV documentary; crowd noises were dubbed in as well to make the film seem like the original performance. "But what you see in the film," an author would later write, "is what happened that night, and the thrill of the event is clear."
- Died: Gian Gaspare Napolitano, 58, Italian film director and screenwriter

== January 6, 1966 (Thursday) ==
- The Student Nonviolent Coordinating Committee (SNCC) became the first African-American civil rights organization to publicly oppose the Vietnam War. "We are in sympathy with, and support, the men in this country who are unwilling to respond to a military draft which would compel them to contribute their lives to United States aggression in Vietnam in the name of the 'freedom' we find so false in this country", the SNCC statement read in part. "We take note of the fact that 16 percent of the draftees from this country are Negroes called on to stifle the liberation of Vietnam, to preserve a 'democracy' which does not exist for them at home. We ask, where is the draft for the freedom fight in the United States?"
- Singers Jerry Garcia and Phil Lesh, who had performed as "The Warlocks", appeared for the first time under their new name, the Grateful Dead. The occasion was the fifth, and largest up that time, of the "Acid Test" concerts, where over 2,000 patrons listened to music, many while under the influence of the hallucinogen LSD, and the venue was the Fillmore in San Francisco, California. Garcia and Lesh had appeared at the first of the Acid Tests on November 27, 1965.
- All 47 people on board the Windjammer Cruises schooner Polynesia were rescued after the ship ran aground on a reef 15 nautical miles (28 km) south of Bimini, Bahamas. Civilian and military watercraft evacuated the group, and 17 of the passengers were lifted from longboats by a United States Coast Guard helicopter. It was the second disaster for Windjammer in less than a week.
- Lockheed delivered its first SR-71 Blackbird, a strategic reconnaissance aircraft that could fly at speeds up to Mach 3, to the U.S. Air Force. The SR-71A prototype would crash only 19 days later.
- Harold Robert Perry became the first African-American in more than 90 years to be made a Roman Catholic bishop. The Louisiana native was elevated to the position of auxiliary bishop of New Orleans.
- The new government of the Central African Republic severed all ties with the People's Republic of China, which had been providing aid to the nation since 1964.
- Born: Jesse Dylan, American film director and production executive; in New York City, as the eldest son of Bob Dylan and Sara Noznisky Dylan
- Died: James Lawrence Fly, 67, American lawyer and former administrator of the Federal Communications Commission, died from cancer

== January 7, 1966 (Friday) ==
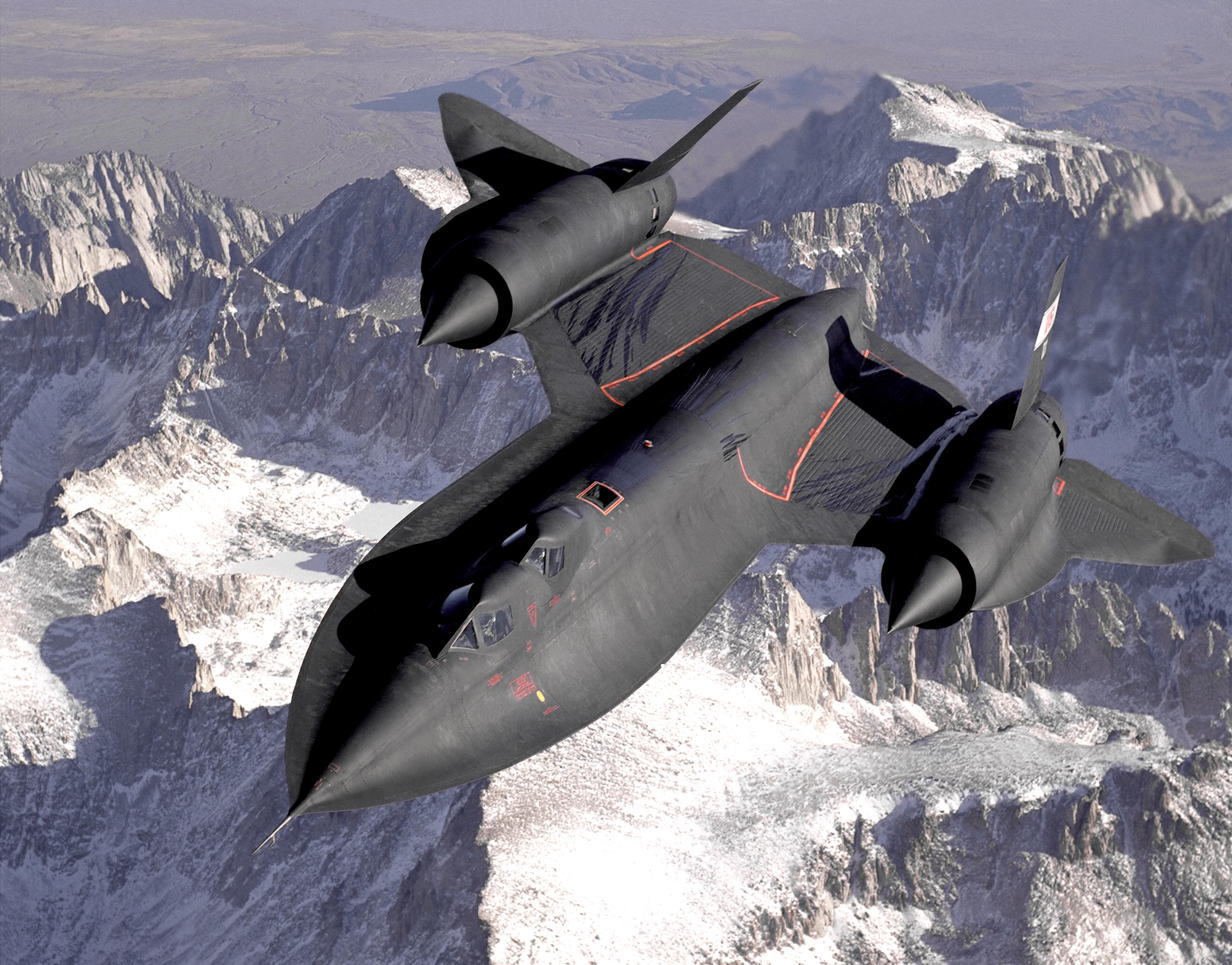
A Lockheed SR-71 Blackbird

- The SR-71 Blackbird spy plane, which had first flown at the end of 1964, went into regular service, as part of the 4200th Strategic Reconnaissance Wing at Beale Air Force Base in California.
- Lou Thesz, dubbed the "Babe Ruth of Pro Wrestling", was defeated for the National Wrestling Association (NWA) championship for the last time, losing to Gene Kiniski. Thesz, whose multiple reigns as NWA champion totaled more than ten years (3,749 days), would later be elected as a charter member of the Professional Wrestling Hall of Fame.
- Helicopters rescued all 179 people who had been trapped in a Canadian National Railway train by snow that had blocked them in the Fraser Canyon in British Columbia. The airlift was accomplished by three private helicopters and a 22-seat Royal Canadian Air Force helicopter.
- The Soviet Union launched the Zenit-2 spacecraft Kosmos 104, the thirty-second of 81 such satellites to be launched. The carrier rocket malfunctioned, placing the spacecraft into the wrong orbit, but it still managed to complete most of its imaging mission.
- A weather record of 1,825 millimeters of rain (equivalent to 71.85 inches or almost six feet) was reached at the end of a 24-hour period on the Indian Ocean island of Réunion as a consequence of Tropical cyclone Denise.
- The Dominica Labour Party won 10 of 11 seats in the Dominican general election with a voter turnout of 80.3%. At the time, Dominica was one of the components of the West Indies Federation.
- Born:
  - Jonathan Jackson, U.S. business professor, entrepreneur, social justice advocate, and son of the Reverend Jesse Jackson; in Chicago
  - Carolyn Bessette-Kennedy, wife of John F. Kennedy Jr.; in White Plains, New York (killed in plane crash, 1999)
  - Ergin Ataman, Turkish basketball coach, Turkey menʼs national and third times period of Anadolu Efes, in Istanbul
- Died: Herbert Sandberg, 63, Swedish conductor, librettist, and composer

== January 8, 1966 (Saturday) ==
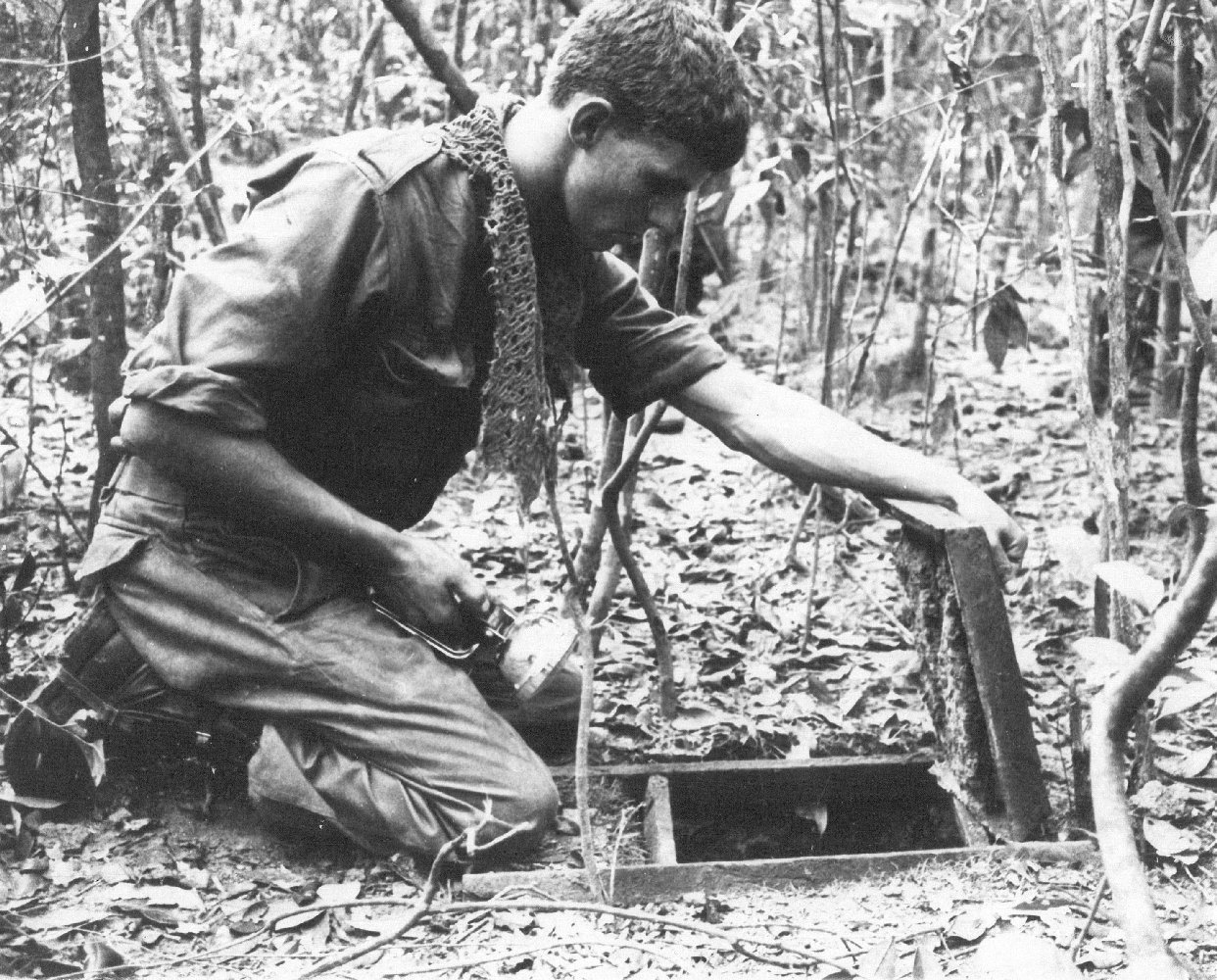
An Australian soldier uncovering a Viet Cong tunnel

- U.S. and Australian forces fighting in Vietnam jointly launched Operation Crimp, also known as the Battle of the Ho Bo Woods, to find and destroy a key Viet Cong headquarters that was believed to be concealed underground in South Vietnam's Binh Duong Province. Fighting until January 14, troops from the U.S. Army 1st Infantry Division and the Australian Army's 1st Battalion, Royal Australian Regiment, killed 190 of the Viet Cong and destroyed the tunnels discovered, at the cost of 14 U.S. and eight Australian lives.
- William Gopallawa, the Governor-General of Ceylon (now Sri Lanka), declared a state of emergency throughout the South Asian island nation, after protests by the Sinhalese majority against recent regulations that favored the Tamil language. A young Buddhist priest was killed by the army crackdown on the riots. Press censorship and curfews would stay in place for 11 months, ending on December 7, 1966.
- Born: Andrew Wood, American grunge musician; in Seattle (d. 1990)

== January 9, 1966 (Sunday) ==
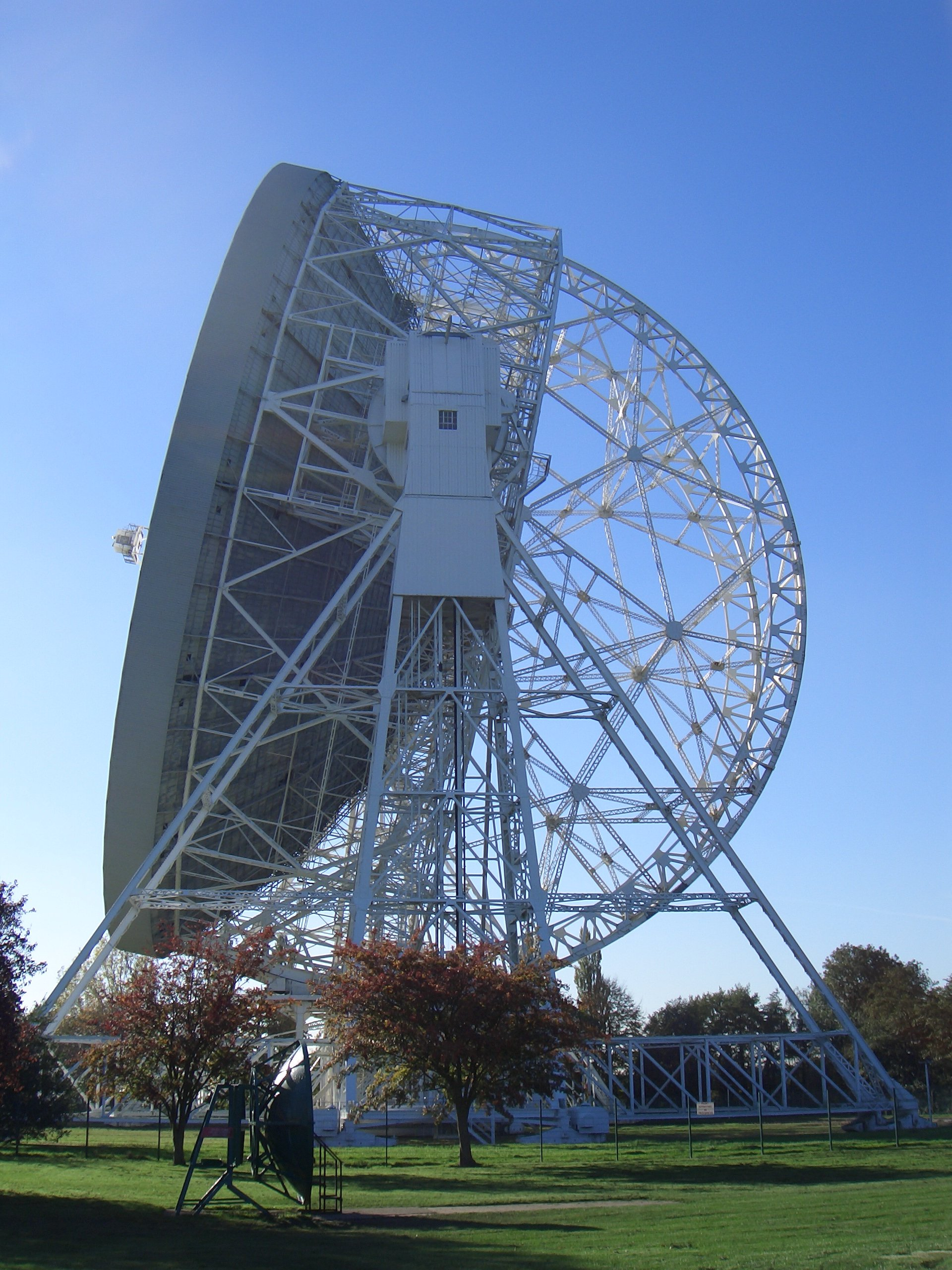
Lovell Telescope

- For the first time, a radar signal was successfully bounced off of the planet Venus and detected on its return to Earth. Astronomers at the Jodrell Bank Observatory, at the University of Manchester in England, were able to pick up the returning signal on the 76-metre (249 ft) diameter Lovell Telescope, which was three times more sensitive than previous radar measuring instruments.

Aswan Dam

- The foundation stone for the Aswan Dam was laid down in Egypt in a ceremony presided over by United Arab Republic President Gamel Abdel Nasser. The flooding that would follow would require the moving of 50,000 residents, mostly Nubian, from the city of Wadi Halfa.
- Seven sailors on board a Chinese landing craft mutinied, but in the ensuing gun battle only three people, all defectors, survived. Taiwan President Chiang Kai-shek proclaimed the three mutineers as heroes, and sent a Defense Ministry seaplane to transport them from Matsu. As the seaplane was flying back to Taiwan, Chinese MiG jets intercepted it and shot it down, killing everyone on board.
- Tom Hayden, Herbert Aptheker and Staughton Lynd, returned to the United States after being the first Americans to be invited to tour North Vietnam. Despite the trip being illegal, the three were not charged nor were their American passports confiscated.
- Australian troops began breaking into the Cu Chi tunnels that allowed troops from the north to infiltrate South Vietnam.
- The 37th National Board of Review Awards were announced, with The Eleanor Roosevelt Story winning Best Film.
- Died:
  - Albert Stevens, 79, American tradesman known as the most radioactive human ever. Stevens was injected with 131 kBq (3.55 μCi) of plutonium in 1945 without his knowledge, and survived.
  - Ladislav Prokeš, 81, Czech chess player

== January 10, 1966 (Monday) ==
Pakistan and India ceasefire
- The Tashkent Declaration was signed in the city of Tashkent in the Soviet Union's Uzbek SSR at 4:00 p.m. local time, by Prime Minister Shastri of India and President Ayub Khan of Pakistan, bringing an end to the Indo-Pakistani War of 1965. The two warring nations agreed that, by February 25, they would withdraw their armed personnel to the same locations that they had held on August 5, prior to the war's start. Prime Minister Shastri would pass away during the night in Tashkent, before his scheduled return to India.
- Vernon Dahmer, 57, African-American civil rights leader, was murdered at his home near Hattiesburg, Mississippi, the day after he had announced that he would begin a voter registration drive for black residents of Forrest County. White supremacists used gasoline bombs to burn his home. Dahmer's wife and 10-year-old daughter escaped, but he died of his injuries at the Hattiesburg Hospital. On August 21, 1998, after 32 years and four trials that ended in a mistrial, Samuel H. Bowers, who had been the Imperial Wizard of the White Knights of the Ku Klux Klan, would be convicted of ordering the murder and sentenced to life in prison.
- The House of Representatives of the U.S. state of Georgia voted, 184 to 12, to bar Julian Bond from taking the 136th District seat to which he had been elected in November. Bond, the first African-American to be elected during the 20th Century, was refused on the grounds that he had written the recent statement by the SNCC opposing the Vietnam War and that, as such, he could not validly swear to support the constitutions of the United States and Georgia. In 1967, the United States Supreme Court would rule that the denial of Bond's seat was an unconstitutional denial of his right of freedom of speech.
- After departing from Norfolk, Virginia, United States, with a shipment of grain bound for Barcelona, the Spanish cargo ship Monte Palomares sank in the Atlantic Ocean 900 nautical miles (1,700 km) north east of Bermuda, killing 31 of her 38 crew. The grain ship's cargo had shifted as it was rocked in a fierce storm, causing the ship to list and then to sink. The American freighter Steel Maker rescued four men, and the U.S. Coast Guard cutter Escanaba saved the others.
- Heavy rains began in Brazil, causing the worst flooding in the 401-year history of Rio de Janeiro, and causing landslides that swept away entire neighborhoods inhabited by the city's poorest residents. When the downpours ended after four days, at least 363 people had been killed in the Rio de Janeiro State, with 193 bodies recovered from the city slums, 100 in the nearby city of Petrópolis, and 70 others in the surrounding countryside.

== January 11, 1966 (Tuesday) ==
- India's Prime Minister Lal Bahadur Shastri was found dead in the dacha where he was staying in Tashkent, Soviet Union, the day after signing a peace agreement with the Prime Minister of Pakistan. Shastri had called his personal physician, Dr. R. N. Chugh, the evening before when he was having chest pains. Shastri, who had twice suffered heart attacks, His wife, Lalita, would claim that he had been poisoned, and the butler who had been attending him would be arrested, but later released.
- George Rogers was replaced by John Silkin as a Lord of the Treasury in Harold Wilson's first UK government.
- Died: Alberto Giacometti, 64, Swiss sculptor, died from heart disease and chronic bronchitis

== January 12, 1966 (Wednesday) ==
- The television series, Batman, produced by William Dozier and starring Adam West and Burt Ward as Batman and Robin, is first broadcast as a mid-season replacement on the ABC network in the United States. Each weekly episode was a two-part cliffhanger, following a formula of the heroes facing their demise from the villain on Wednesday evening, and the duo's escape and triumph on the Thursday installment. Written primarily by Lorenzo Semple, the show combined camp humor with the action film genre, and appealed to both adults and children.
- The body of India's Prime Minister Lal Bahadur Shastri was cremated in a traditional Hindu ceremony in New Delhi on the day after his death. As a crowd estimated at over 1,000,000 mourners watched, along with Soviet Prime Minister Kosygin, U.S. Vice-president Hubert Humphrey, India's President Sarvepalli Radhakrishnan, and Acting Prime Minister Gulzarilal Nanda watched as Shastri's son lit a funeral pyre. Afterward, the ashes were scattered in the Yamuna River.
- In his first State of the Union Address as President of the United States, Lyndon Johnson told Congress and television viewers that the nation could afford both the funding of the cost of social programs and an ongoing war, saying "I believe that we can continue the Great Society while we fight in Vietnam." Johnson also proposed the creation of a new cabinet level department, the United States Department of Transportation.

== January 13, 1966 (Thursday) ==
- Police in Beverly Hills, California, United States, foiled a plot to kidnap millionaire tire executive Leonard Firestone, but inadvertently killed the informant who had alerted them to the plot. George Skalla had tipped off police that his friend, William Calvin Bailey, was planning to invade Firestone's home, then hold the business leader for a two million dollar ransom. Firestone and his family were safely away, and four police officers were waiting at his mansion when Bailey and Skalla, who police said was afraid to back out of the plan, arrived. Skalla was instructed not to wear a mask and to drop to the floor as soon as he and Bailey entered the house, but when Bailey aimed a pistol at the police, they opened fire and killed both men.
- In an episode in the second season of the U.S. television show Bewitched, the fictional character "Tabitha Stevens" was born. The story arc of the pregnancy of TV character Samantha Stevens had been written to coincide with the pregnancy of actress Elizabeth Montgomery during 1965. Off screen, Montgomery and her husband, Bewitched producer William Asher, had become parents to a son, Robert Asher, born on October 5, 1965.
- The strike by New York City's public transportation workers ended after twelve days of traffic jams caused by the halting of subway and bus service. During the strike New York City businesses lost an estimated $1,500,000,000 in business revenues, and the cost to the city of increased wages and benefits was $52,000,000.
- Born: Patrick Dempsey, American actor and race car driver; in Lewiston, Maine

== January 14, 1966 (Friday) ==
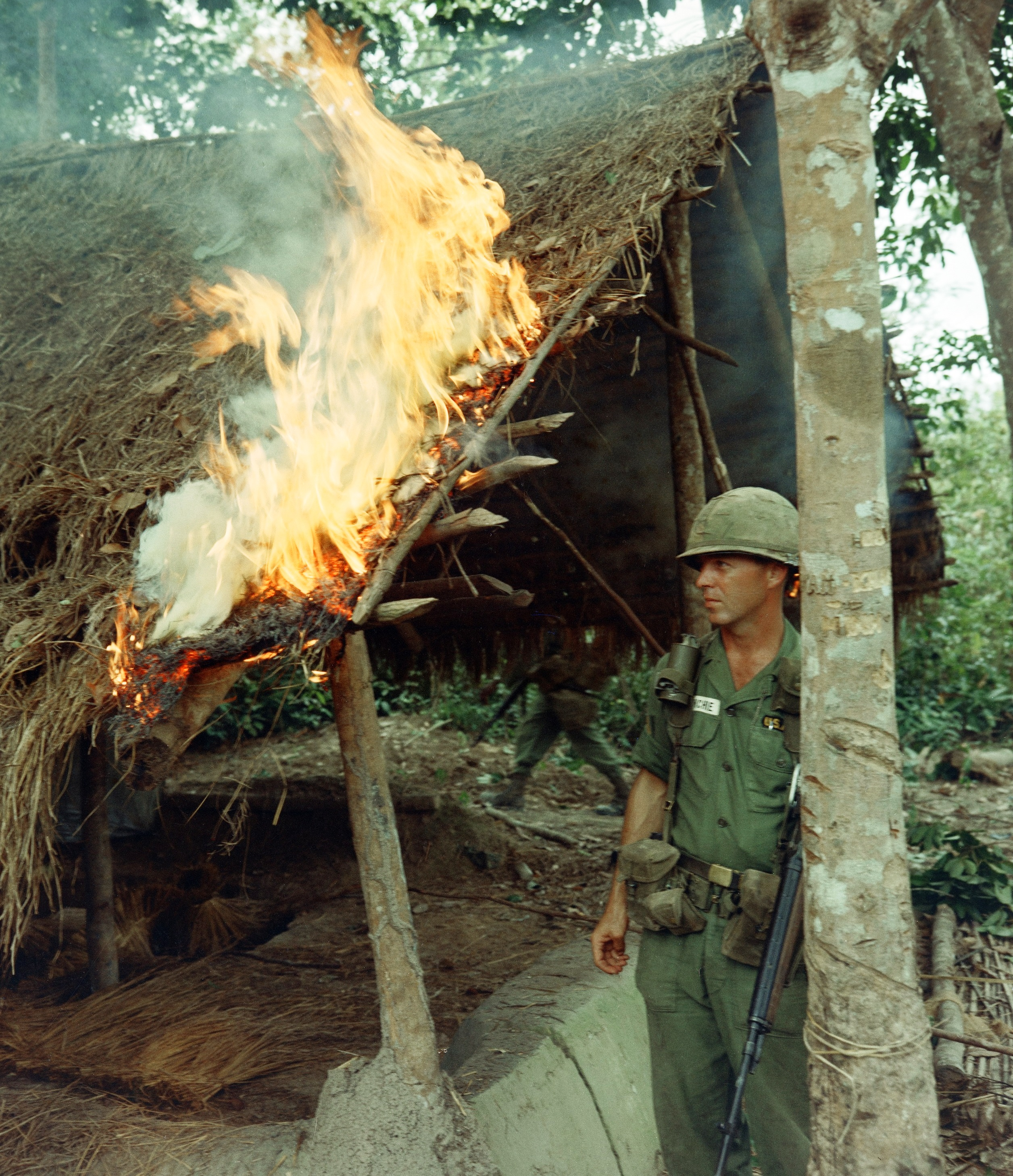
January 14, 1966: U.S. soldier burns Viet Cong building during Operation Crimp

- Operation Crimp, the joint U.S. and Australian operation in the Vietnam War, ended six days after its January 8 start, with 190 Viet Cong killed and a network of infiltration tunnels destroyed, at a loss of 22 allied lives (14 American, 8 Australian).
- Television was broadcast for the first time in the South American nation of Colombia as TV-9 TeleBogotá began transmitting at 6:30 in the evening and signed off at 10:15, following the scheduled seven days a week before expanding. Known as "Teletigre", the station debuted on TV Channel 9, with the live children's program Club del Zorro for 15 minutes, followed by the 30-minute women's program La Perfecta Ama de la Casa ("The Perfect Housewife").
- The crash of Avianca Flight 4 killed 56 of the 64 people on board. Shortly after the Douglas C-54 took off from the Colombian resort of Cartagena on a flight to Bogotá, the plane lost power and made a gradual descent into the Caribbean Sea, then sank in waters 12 feet (3.7 m) deep. Only eight people escaped drowning before water filled the cabin.
- The Marshall Space Flight Center (MSFC) asked aerospace industry officials for proposals on efficiently integrating equipment into the payload of Apollo spacecraft, including the Apollo Lunar Module and the S-IVB stage of the Saturn IB and Saturn V rockets.
- Six people were killed when the French ship Le Trégor sank 5 nautical miles (9.3 km) off Cap Gris-Nez following a collision with an unnamed motor vessel.
- Born: Dan Schneider, American television producer and actor; in Memphis, Tennessee
- Died: Sergei Korolev, 59, Soviet rocket engineer who was chiefly responsible for the advances of the Soviet Union's space program in the 1950s and early 1960s, died during surgery for removal of a tumor in his colon. Korolev's importance had remained undisclosed by the Soviet press during his lifetime. In an editorial a week later, The New York Times eulogized him by noting that "[D]eath has finally declassified the role and identity of Academician Sergei P. Korolev, the man who provided the scientific and technical leadership of the Soviet rocket program... Korolev's rockets were powerful enough to send men into orbit and to put cameras into position to photograph the back side of the Moon. But they were too weak to break the chains of secrecy that denied him, while he lived, the world applause he deserved...."

== January 15, 1966 (Saturday) ==
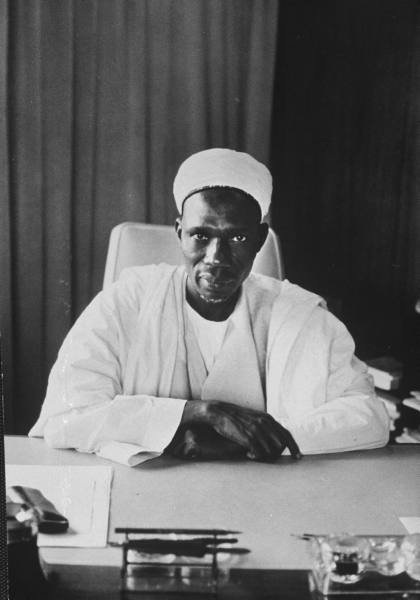
Prime Minister Balewa

- In Nigeria, a conspiracy referred to as "The Majors' Coup" because of the military rank of the coup leaders was carried out. Nigerian Prime Minister Abubakar Balewa, and the Northern State premier Ahmadu Bello and the Western State premier, Chief Samuel Ladoke Akintola, were all murdered, along with Balewa's Finance Minister, Festus Okotie-Eboh. Major Emmanuel Ifeajuna led his officers into Balewa's residence in Lagos. Balewa had surrendered to the officers after being assured of his safety. When the coup attempt collapsed, Balewa was shot to death. President Nnamdi Azikiwe was out of the country at the time, taking a vacation on a cruise ship.
- Air-to-air combat in Vietnam took on a new dimension, when a U.S. Navy RF-8 reconnaissance airplane spotted a MiG-21 jet fighter with North Vietnamese insignia. Previously, the North Vietnam Air Force had had little success with MiG-17 fighters, which were slower and had fewer missiles than the American F-105 jets.
- The 1966 Five Nations Championship in rugby union began with a 3–3 tie between Scotland and France at Edinburgh, and an 11–6 win by Wales over England at London. Each of the national teams (the other was Ireland) would play each other once during the competition.
- Slightly less than a month after Britain had started an oil embargo, Rhodesia's supply of gasoline ran out as the storage facilities at the Feruka Refinery ran dry.

== January 16, 1966 (Sunday) ==
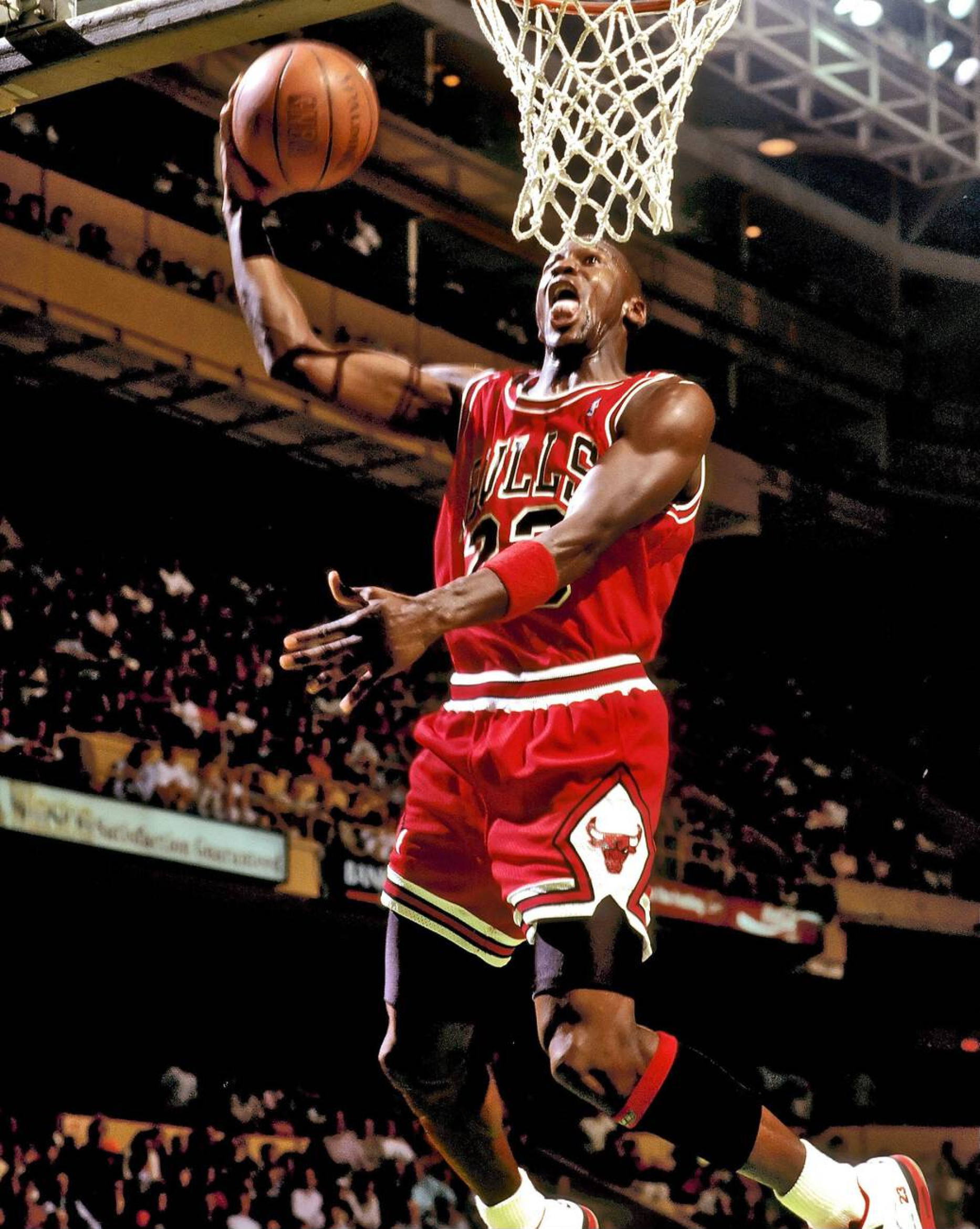
Chicago Bulls star Michael Jordan in 1987

- The Chicago Bulls were granted an expansion franchise by the National Basketball Association (NBA), to begin play in the 1966–67 season as the NBA's 10th team. In more than 50 years, the Bulls would be known for playing a major part in popularizing the NBA worldwide and for having Michael Jordan and Scottie Pippen play for the team, both winning six NBA championships with the Bulls in the 1990s.
- One day after the military coup that killed many of the leaders in Nigeria during the absence of President Nnamdi Azikiwe, Acting President Nwafor Orizu announced to the nation that "I have tonight been advised by the Council of Ministers that they had come to the unanimous decision voluntarily to hand over the administration of the country to the Armed Forces of the Republic, with immediate effect." In that most of the government ministers had been hiding out of fear of assassination, there were few Council members present, but Orizu passed along the military statement that "All Ministers are assured of their personal safety by the new administration." Orizu finished by announcing that he would surrender the presidency to Major General Johnson Aguiyi-Ironsi.
- The Space Science Board of the U.S. National Academy of Sciences outlined research objectives for the 1970s and early 1980s in lunar exploration and planetary exploration. The Board recommended that uncrewed exploration of Mars should have first priority after the Apollo program ended, followed by probes to Venus and further studies of the lunar surface. Overall, uncrewed scientific research in space would have priority over missions with astronauts.
- The BBC began broadcasting a television adaptation of David Copperfield in the UK, starring Ian McKellen as the adult David and Flora Robson as Betsey Trotwood.
- The Quindío Department was created as a separate province within the Republic of Colombia.
- Died: Sadhu T. L. Vaswani, 86, Indian scholar and educator

== January 17, 1966 (Monday) ==
- Three hydrogen bombs were dropped on Spain near the coastal town of Palomares, and a fourth one fell into the deep ocean, after the B-52 bomber carrying them collided with a KC-135 refueling airplane. Fortunately, none of the bombs detonated, though each of the four Mark 28 thermonuclear warheads had a 70-kiloton yield. At 10:22 a.m. local time, the B-52 was flying at 31,000 feet (9,400 m) and preparing for a refueling in midair, but accidentally pitched upward and rammed the tanker plane, spilling jet fuel that ignited on both aircraft. One of the H-bombs parachuted to the ground unscathed; two more fell at high speed, and the conventional explosives in their casing scattered radioactive plutonium over 558 acres (almost one square mile) of countryside; but the fourth H-bomb could not be located (a search would eventually discover it at the bottom of the Mediterranean Sea in waters 2,250 feet (690 m) deep). Fortunately, no nuclear explosion was triggered (a 70 kiloton bomb would have collapsed most houses within a 1-mile (1.6 km) radius) and the missing bomb did not fall under the control of forces hostile to the United States. All of the men on board the tanker were killed, and only four of the men on the B-52 were able to parachute to safety. Initial reports released to the press did not mention that the B-52 had been carrying thermonuclear bombs.
- NASA and McDonnell Aircraft outlined plans for possible future Gemini space missions. Gemini 8, slated for the first docking in orbit with another spacecraft, was planned to have three "space walks", including one in darkness, and would undock and then redock during the activity. The extravehicular activity would involve the S-10 (micrometeorite collection) experiment, retrieval of equipment from the Agena target vehicle, and using power tools in space. (The Gemini 8 mission, however, would be aborted before any of the experiments could be executed, because Neil A. Armstrong and David R. Scott encountered problems after reaching orbit.) Plans for Gemini 9 included a simulated lunar module rendezvous and abort, use of the modular maneuvering unit, and parking the Gemini 8 and Gemini 9 Agenas. (Astronauts Thomas P. Stafford and Eugene Cernan, however, would not be able to accomplish those tasks due to complications in orbit.) Gemini 10 would include rendezvous with a parked Agena and retrieval of the S-10 experiment. (Both of those would be accomplished by astronauts John W. Young and Michael Collins.)
- In Nigeria, the new Federal Military Government issued the Constitution Suspension and Modification Decree, replacing the elected local leaders and representatives with military governors who could issue edicts or enforce decrees.
- Born:
  - Gary "Big Daddy" Goodridge, former Trinidadian-Canadian kickboxer, mixed martial arts athlete and world arm wrestling champion; in Saint James
  - Shabba Ranks (stage name for Rexton Gordon), Jamaican singer; in Sturgetown, St. Ann
- Died:
  - Newcomb Mott, 27, American book salesman who had been arrested on September 4, 1965, when he sneaked across the border between Norway and the Soviet Union. Mott had been convicted on November 24 of illegal entry into the country, sentenced to 18 months in prison, and was being transferred by train to a forced labor camp in Murmansk. Soviet authorities said five days later that Mott had committed suicide while on the trip.
  - Georges Figon, French "barbouze", shot himself on the eve of his second trial for the kidnapping of Mehdi Ben Barka.

== January 18, 1966 (Tuesday) ==
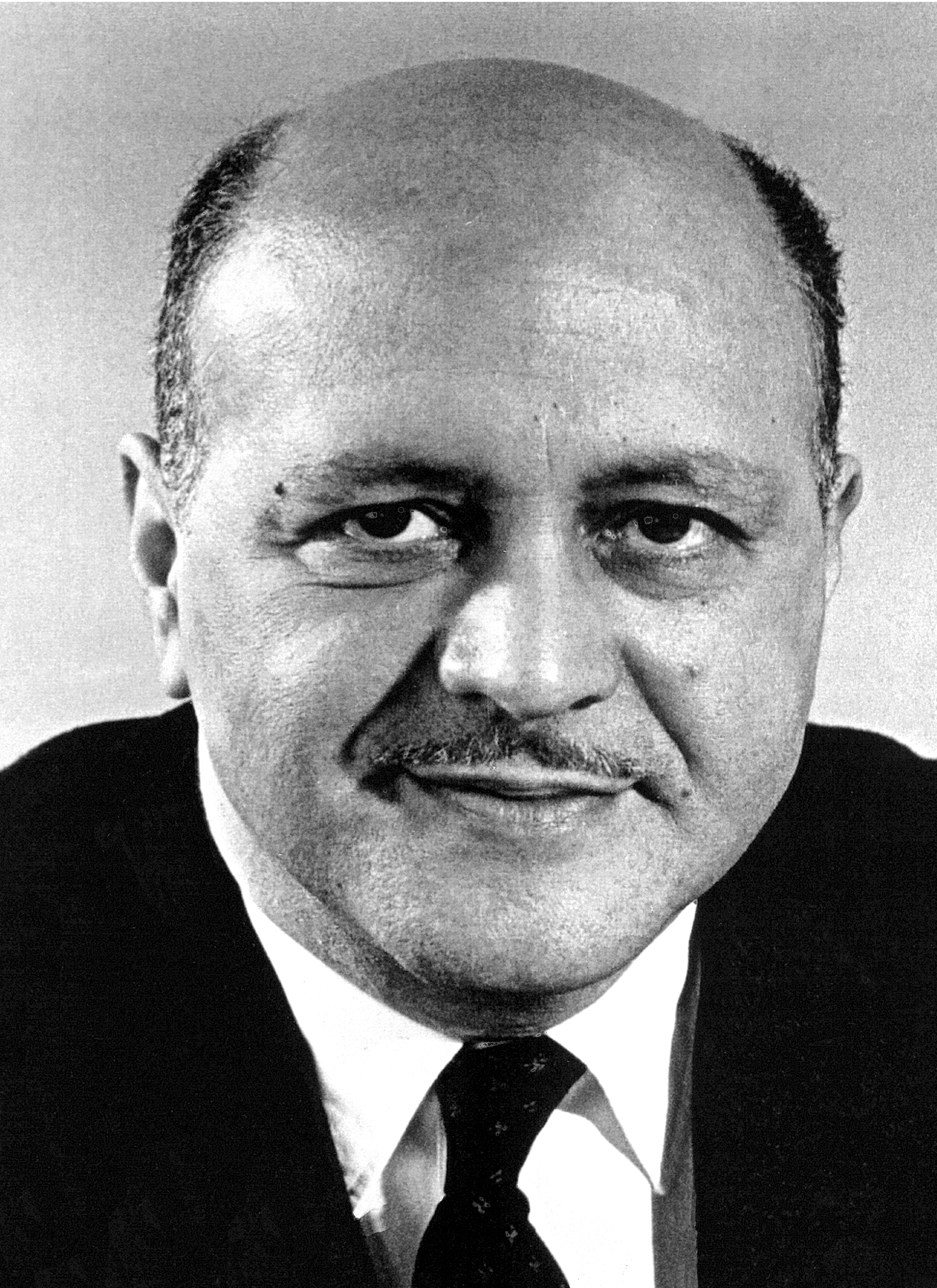
HUD Secretary Weaver

- Robert C. Weaver became the first African American to serve as a member of the U.S. president's cabinet, as well as the first United States Secretary of Housing and Urban Development, hours after being confirmed by the U.S. Senate. Weaver had already been serving as the Director of the U.S. Housing and Home Finance Agency when the HHFA was elevated to Cabinet-level status.
- About 8,500 additional U.S. soldiers arrived in South Vietnam in a single day, as 4,500 members of the 1st U.S. Marine Regiment made an amphibious landing at Chu Lai, and more than 4,000 members of the 2nd Brigade of the U.S. Army's 25th Infantry Division came ashore at Vũng Tàu. The number of U.S. troops in South Vietnam now topped 200,000.
- For the first time in the history of the New York Stock Exchange, the Dow Jones Industrial Average broke the 1,000 point barrier, reaching a high of 1,000.50 before closing the day at 994.20. It would not close at over 1,000 until November 14, 1972.

== January 19, 1966 (Wednesday) ==
- A quorum of 526 of the 551 members of the Congress Party members of the Indian Parliament met to select a new leader after the recent death of Lal Bahadur Shastri, and thus to fill the vacant office of Prime Minister of India. Indira Gandhi, the daughter of Jawaharlal Nehru, won 355 votes, and her challenger, Morarji Desai, received 169, while two were declared invalid.
- The boundary between Argentina and Uruguay along the Uruguay River was fixed after the ratification of the treaty signed between the two South American nations on April 7, 1961.
- Born: Stefan Edberg, Swedish tennis player who was ranked number one in the world among male players during 1990 and 1991; in Västervik

== January 20, 1966 (Thursday) ==
- Radio Caroline, the "pirate radio" station that had been broadcasting rock music to the United Kingdom from a ship anchored outside of British territorial waters, went off the air when a storm wrecked the MV Mi Amigo. The eight members of the station were rescued after the boat was run aground at Frinton-on-Sea.
- Robert Menzies, the Prime Minister of Australia, announced in a nationally broadcast address to the nation that he would resign, effective on Australia Day (January 26). Treasurer Harold Holt was subsequently elected by the Liberal Party as the new head of the government.
- The West German cargo ship Kremsertor foundered in heavy weather off Plymouth, Devon, United Kingdom. All 27 crew were rescued by the German tug Atlantic or by a helicopter from 845 Naval Air Squadron based at RNAS Culdrose, Cornwall.

== January 21, 1966 (Friday) ==
- Italian Prime Minister Aldo Moro and his coalition government resigned following the defeat in the Chamber of Deputies of a bill to establish government-funded nursery schools. When Deputies from the various coalition parties joined with Liberals, Fascists and Communists in voting against the measure, the Cabinet ministers viewed it as a vote of no confidence. Observers speculated that former Foreign Minister Amintore Fanfani had worked with different legislators in bringing about the vote, after having been forced to resign a month earlier.
- The Federal Bureau of Investigation discontinued further electronic eavesdropping of Martin Luther King Jr. Associate Director Clyde Tolson reviewed a report from a listening device planted at the Americana Hotel, and wrote on it "Remove this surveillance at once"; FBI Director J. Edgar Hoover seconded the recommendation.
- The corpse of Sir Abubakar Balewa, the Prime Minister of Nigeria who had been kidnapped five days earlier, was found on a roadside about 27 miles (43 km) from Lagos. Balewa would be buried the following day.
- Testing of Gemini 8's freon-14 EVA propulsion system was completed, eliminating earlier freezing problems. The freon-14 system replaced the use of oxygen for propulsion fuel, as done by astronaut Ed White on Gemini 4.
- General Johnson Aguiyi-Ironsi proclaimed himself as the new President of Nigeria at the head of the new Federal Executive Council, and the new commander of the Supreme Military Council.
- McDonnell completed assembly of the augmented target docking adapter (ATDA), which was shipped to Cape Kennedy on February 4.
- Died: Sir Shane Dunne Paltridge, 55, Senator for Western Australia and leader of the opposition Liberal Party, died from cancer. Paltridge had resigned his leadership of the Liberal Party two days before his death.

== January 22, 1966 (Saturday) ==
- All six crewmen and 22 of the 27 passengers on board a DC-3 airliner operated by the Haitian airline COHATA (Compagnie Haitienne de Transports Aeriens) were killed when the plane crashed in the mountains, 25 minutes after taking off from Les Cayes on the last leg of a trip from Port-au-Prince to Jérémie. The American aircraft carrier USS Saratoga sent helicopters to rescue the five survivors.
- The U.S. Air Force completed Operation Blue Light, the largest airlift of troops and equipment into a combat zone in history. Since the operation began on December 27, 1965, the Air Force had flown 4,600 short tons (4,173 metric tons) of equipment and over 3,000 troops from Hickam Air Force Base, Hawaii, to Pleiku, South Vietnam.
- Elections were held for the first time on the island of Nauru as voting was conducted for the nine elected members of the 14-member Legislative Council. Only 900 of the 6,057 inhabitants of Nauru were eligible to vote, but there was a large turnout for a choice among the 25 candidates for the nine vacancies.
- President Kwame Nkrumah of Ghana and Chairman Edgar Kaiser, Sr. of Kaiser Aluminum dedicated the Akosombo Dam on the Volta River.
- Died: Herbert Marshall, 75, English film actor known for portraying "the urbane, well-educated British gentleman".

== January 23, 1966 (Sunday) ==
- American motorcycle rider Bob Knievel of Montana and his group put on their first public show under his new name, performing for two hours at the National Date Festival in Indio, California, as "Evel Knievel and the Motorcycle Daredevils". Beginning a successful career of driving his motorcycle up a ramp and jumping great distances to another ramp, Knievel impressed the Festival crowd by leaping over two trucks that had been parked end to end.
- The British tanker Chelwood Beacon ran aground in New York Bay, 1.5 nautical miles (2.8 km) east of Sandy Hook, New Jersey, United States. Thirty-nine crew were taken off by the pilot boat New Jersey. Thirteen crew and a pilot were taken off the next day by a Coast Guard vessel. The ship would later be refloated, repaired and returned to service.

== January 24, 1966 (Monday) ==
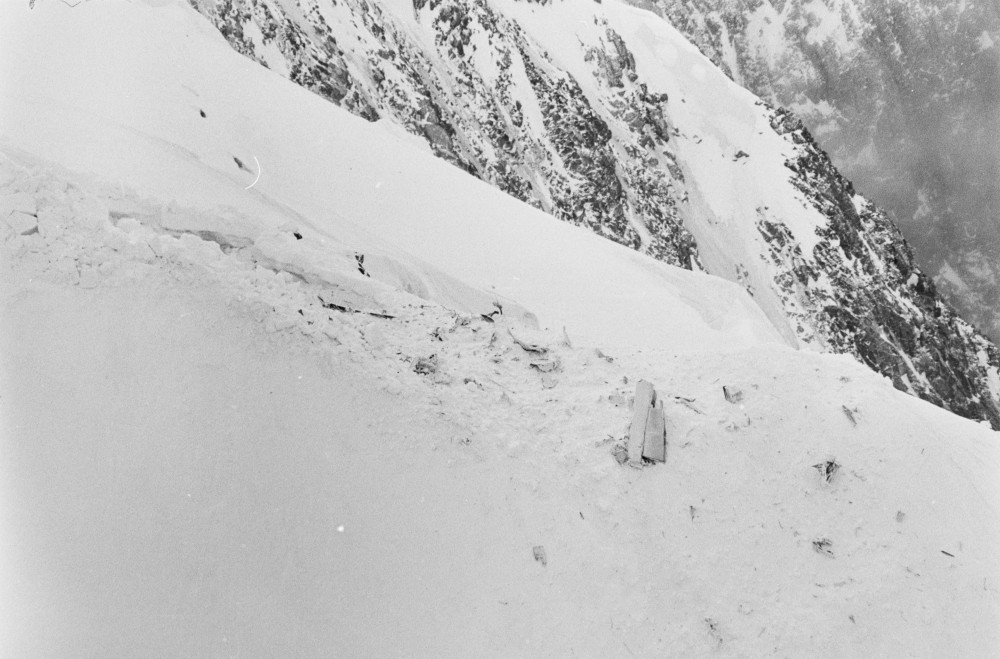
January 24, 1966: The site where Flight 101 crashed

- Air India Flight 101, a Boeing 707-437 named for the Himalayan mountain Kanchenjunga, crashed into a ridge of Mont Blanc, the highest mountain in the French Alps, at 8:25 a.m. local time. All 106 passengers and 11 crew on board were killed. On November 3, 1950, Air India Flight 245 had crashed in almost exactly the same spot. The jet, en route from Mumbai to New York City, had been at an altitude of 15,000 feet (4,600 m) as it approached for a landing at Geneva, when a violent snowstorm on the 15,771-foot (4,807 m) high Mont Blanc pulled the plane into the mountainside. Mountain climbers would find remains of the airplane as late as 2012, when a bag of diplomatic mail from the Indian Ministry of External Affairs was found by a rescue worker.
- Thirteen men were rescued from the disabled British tanker Chelwood Beacon about 15 miles (24 km) south of Manhattan, 1 1/2 miles east of Sandy Hook, New Jersey, where the 665-foot (203 m) tanker had run aground during a snowstorm the day before.
- Indira Gandhi was sworn into office as Prime Minister of India. President Sarvepalli Radhakrishnan administered the oath at the Ashoka Room of the presidential palace.
- Died: Dr. Homi J. Bhabha, 56, Indian nuclear physicist and chairman of the Indian Atomic Energy Commission, was killed in the crash of Air India Flight 101. Dr. Bhabha, founder of India's nuclear research program, died six years before India achieved the explosion of its first nuclear bomb.

== January 25, 1966 (Tuesday) ==
- The first crash of a Lockheed SR-71 Blackbird, the fastest airplane up to that time, occurred when pilot Bill Weaver and co-pilot Jim Zwayer were making a turn while flying Mach 3.18 at an altitude of 78,800 feet (24,000 m). The jet disintegrated around them, but the pilots' pressure suits and parachutes initiated automatically, and both landed on a cattle ranch in New Mexico. Weaver survived unharmed, but Zwayer had sustained a broken neck when the plane broke apart and he died instantly.
- The Soviet Union launched the satellite Kosmos 106 as a radar target for anti-ballistic missile tests.
- Born: Donal MacIntyre, Irish investigative journalist; in Dublin

== January 26, 1966 (Wednesday) ==
- Three children — 9-year-old Jane Beaumont, 7-year-old Arnna Beaumont and 4-year-old Grant Beaumont — disappeared after visiting the beach at Glenelg, South Australia, near Adelaide. No trace of the children was ever found, nor were any suspects charged with the crime. Fifty years later, the crime would remain unsolved despite a half century of investigations.
- Harold Holt became Prime Minister of Australia when Robert Menzies retired.

== January 27, 1966 (Thursday) ==
- In a special by-election, Britain's Labour Party unexpectedly retained the parliamentary seat of Kingston upon Hull North, in voting fill the vacancy caused by the November 7 death of Henry Solomons. The by-election took on special importance because Labour had only a 316–313 majority over the opposition Conservative and Liberal parties. Labour made an all-out fight for the seat, including a promise by the Minister of Transport to build the Humber Bridge to shorten travel time within Hull. To make matters worse, Conservative M.P. Edith Pitt died on the same day, leaving the Tories with only 312 seats. Prime Minister Harold Wilson would call for a nationwide election soon after seeing the strength of the Labour win.
- U.S. Senator Clinton P. Anderson, Chairman of the U.S. Senate Committee on Aeronautical and Space Sciences, outlined the committee's views of what NASA's goals should be after Apollo. Writing to NASA Administrator James E. Webb, Anderson noted the contribution of space exploration and research to America's position of world leadership, but told Webb that NASA must be prepared to move without delay to other programs once the Apollo program was over.
- Born: Ken Sugimori, Japanese video game designer, illustrator, and primary character designer for the Pokémon franchise; in Tokyo
- Died: Grover Cleveland Bergdoll, 72, known as "America's Most Notorious Draft Dodger". Bergdoll fled the United States rather than responding to a draft board notice during World War I. After returning to the United States in 1939, Bergdoll served a prison sentence until 1944, and lived his final years in Richmond, Virginia.

== January 28, 1966 (Friday) ==
- In Vietnam, Operation Masher, the largest "search and destroy" mission in the history of the war, and Operation Double Eagle, the largest amphibious landing of the war, both began on the same day, with the American and South Vietnamese (ARVN) armies fighting in an allied operation. Masher (later renamed Operation White Wing) was carried out in the Binh Dinh province under the lead of the U.S. 1st Cavalry Division, along with the 22nd Division of the ARVN and an infantry division of the South Korean Army, but "produced only minor contacts with the enemy" and left thousands of civilians as homeless refugees. U.S. losses were 288 killed and 990 wounded. In Double Eagle, thousands of U.S. and South Vietnamese Marines came ashore in the neighboring Quang Ngai province. Both operations would last six weeks, ending on March 6.
- George E. Mueller, NASA's Associate Administrator for Manned Space Flight, summarized his view that the Apollo Applications Program should provide the foundation for the next major U.S. space program and for the goal of using space technology for the benefit of humanity. Among the goals would be improved weather forecasting, regularly-maintained communications satellites, monitoring management of Earth resources, solving problems of air pollution, and establishing astronomical observatories in space and on the Moon to explore the origins of the Solar System and the origin of life on Earth.
- All 46 people on Lufthansa Flight 005 were killed. The Convair CV-440 Metropolitan aborted its landing in heavy rain at Bremen Airport in West Germany, but crashed doing a subsequent go around maneuver. The dead included Bruno Bianchi, 22; Sergio De Gregorio, 19; Dino Rora, 20; and four other members of the Italian Olympic swimming team, as well as their trainer Paolo Costoli, 55, and West German actress Ada Tschechowa, 49.
- The U.S. Selective Service System announced that it would change its guidelines for conscription of college students and college-bound high school graduates, by barring "Class 2-S" draft deferments for students whose grades were in the lower half of their freshman class, the lower one-third of their sophomore class or the lower one-fourth of their junior class.
- Died: Suzanne Lacascade, 81, Martiniquais writer, in the 15th arrondissement of Paris, France.

== January 29, 1966 (Saturday) ==
- The "Luxembourg compromise" was reached between the six members of the European Economic Community (commonly called the "Common Market"), bringing France back into the EEC. Ultimately, the other members (West Germany, Italy, Belgium, Netherlands and Luxembourg) agreed to a French proposal that any one of the six nations would have the right of a veto over "decisions affecting the essential interests of one of the Member States." The formal agreement was signed the next day and, because there was no definition of what would constitute "essential" interests, the EEC Council would not vote on any matters for the next three years.
- Heavy rains west of the Rocky Mountains turned into heavy snows toward the east, as record low temperatures, high winds and heavy snowfall struck from the United States and Canada from the Rockies to the East Coast. By the time the storm eased, over 200 people had been killed in the U.S., half of them in the southeastern United States. Deaths attributable to the storm came from being frozen to death, dying in fires started while people were trying to heat their homes, from heart attacks while shoveling snow or pushing cars, or in traffic accidents caused by slick roads.
- A collision near Chandpur Port on the Padma River of East Pakistan, between a passenger ship and a steamship, killed 80 people and injured 38; almost 100 other people on the passenger launch, which had been traveling down the river from Faridpur.
- The first of 608 performances of Sweet Charity opened at the Palace Theatre in New York City.
- Born: Romário (Romário de Souza Faria), Brazilian footballer with 70 caps for the Brazil national team, later a politician and Vice President of the Brazilian Senate from 2021 to 2023; in Rio de Janeiro

== January 30, 1966 (Sunday) ==
- The United Kingdom announced that, effective February 3, it was halting nearly all trade with the southern African nation of Rhodesia, whose white minority government had unilaterally declared itself independent in November. The British Board of Trade placed a ban on all new imports from Rhodesia, and a ban of all exports except for those for humanitarian purposes, such as food or medical aid.

== January 31, 1966 (Monday) ==
- After a 37-day moratorium that had started on December 24, 1965, the United States resumed the bombing of North Vietnam and launched Operation Rolling Thunder. Among the first targets destroyed were a bridge at Đồng Hới, a highway ferry complex in Thanh Hóa Province, and barges near the city of Vinh. In all, there were 58 air strikes that day, though only 10 were considered effective.
- The Soviet Union launched Luna 9 from the Baikonur Cosmodrome at 5:42 p.m. local time as a lunar probe that would deliver a capsule to a controlled landing on the Moon. The probe would transmit photographs back to Earth after descending into the Oceanus Procellarum on February 3.
- Died: Carolyn Mitchell (Barbara Rooney), 29, American actress and fifth wife of actor Mickey Rooney, was found dead at the Rooneys' home in Brentwood, California, only 10 days after the two had legally separated. She had been the victim of a murder-suicide, shot by her boyfriend, Serbian film actor Milos Milosevic, who then committed suicide. The day before, Mrs. Rooney had visited her husband in the hospital and had discussed a reconciliation.
