= Abdallah Chikota =

Tanzanian politician

Honourable Abdallah Chikota MP

Member of Parliament for Nanyamba
- In office 2015–2020

Personal details
- Born: February 28, 1966 (age 60)
- Party: Chama Cha Mapinduzi

Abdallah Dadi Chikota Nanyamba (born February 28, 1966) is a Tanzanian politician and a member of the Chama Cha Mapinduzi political party. He was elected MP representing Nanyamba in 2015.
