= Léonie Keingiaert de Gheluvelt =

Belgian mayor

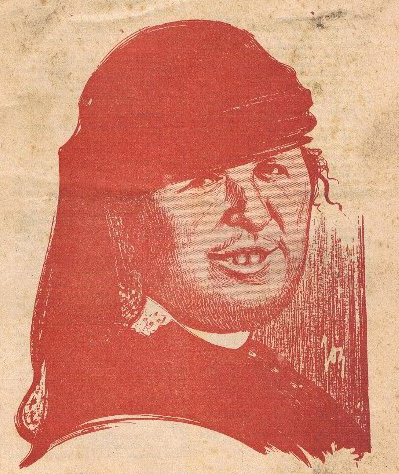
Keingiaert de Gheluvelt (by Jos De Swerts, 1923)

Léonie Keingiaert de Gheluvelt (August 3, 1885 – February 28, 1966) was the first woman mayor in Belgium.

Born into an aristocratic family in Leuven, she was elected mayor of Gheluvelt, a village near Ypres, in October 1921 after a law was passed allowing women to serve as mayors in August 1921. Her term ended in 1926, although she was still elected to the village council. Keingiaert de Gheluvelt served as mayor again from 1932 to 1938. From 1959 to 1965, she was alderman responsible for finances and education.

Between World War I and World War II, she contributed to the feminist journal Le Féminisme chrétien de Belgique.

She died in the hospital at Kortrijk at the age of 80.
