= Lord (surname) =

Lord is a surname, and may refer to:

- Albert Lord, (1912–1991), Professor of Slavic literature
- Amnon Lord (born 1952), Israeli journalist
- Andrew Lord (disambiguation)
- Austin W. Lord (1860–1922), American architect
- Ben Lord, American drummer
- Bernard Lord (born 1965), Canadian politician
- Bette Bao Lord (born 1938), Chinese-born American writer
- Brad Lord (born 2000), American baseball player
- Buff Lord (1892–1985), English rugby league footballer
- Charles Lord (1928–1993), United States investment banker
- Chester Sanders Lord (1850–1933), New York journalist
- Cynthia Lord, children's author
- David Lord (disambiguation), multiple people
- Del Lord (1894–1970), film director and actor best known as a director of Three Stooges films
- Eda Hurd Lord (1854–1938), American businesswoman
- Edwin Chesley Estes Lord (1868–1954), American geologist and petrographer
- Elyse Ashe Lord (1900–1971), British artist
- Evelyn Lord (1926–2024), American politician
- Frank Lord (1936–2005), English footballer and manager
- Frederic Ives Lord (1897–1967), American professional soldier
- Frederic Wait Lord (1871–1951), American energy executive and author
- Gary Lord (artist) (born 1952), Ohio-based faux painting artist and teacher
- Gary Lord (rugby league) (born 1966), rugby league footballer of the 1980s, 1990s and 2000s (older brother of Paul Lord (rugby league))
- Geoff Lord (born 1945), Australian business man
- George Lord (1818–1880), Australian politician
- George Edwin Lord (1846–1876), U.S. Army assistant surgeon
- George P. Lord (1831–1917), New York politician
- Herbert Gardiner Lord (1849–1930), American philosopher
- Holyn Lord (born 1973), American tennis player
- Jack Lord (1920–1998), American actor
- James Lord (disambiguation), various
- Jammal Lord (born 1981), American former football quarterback
- Jarvis Lord (1816–1887), New York politician
- Joe Lord (1922–1986), American professional basketball player
- John Lord (disambiguation), various
- Jon Lord (politician) (1956–2014), Canadian politician
- Jon Lord (1941–2012), English composer and pianist (Deep Purple)
- Jonathan Lord (born 1962), British politician
- Jonathan Luke Lord
- Justine Lord (born 1937), English actress
- Kara Lord (born 1988), Miss Guyana Universe 2011
- Karen Lord (born 1968), Barbadian writer
- M.G. Lord (fl. 2012), American writer
- Malcolm Lord (born 1946), English footballer
- Marjorie Lord (1918–2015), American actress
- Mary Lou Lord (born 1965), American indie folk musician
- Matt Lord (born 1978), New Zealand rugby union player
- Michael Lord, the Lord Framlingham (born 1938), British politician
- Miles Lord (1919–2016), American jurist
- Paul Lord (rugby league) (born 1967), rugby league footballer of the 1980s and 1990s (younger brother of Gary Lord (rugby league))
- Paul Lord (born 1969), English squash player
- Phil Lord (born 1975), American film director, screenwriter and producer
- Peter Lord (born 1953), British animator
- Quinn Lord, a Canadian actor
- Rebecca Lord (born 1973), French pornographic actress
- Remember L. H. Lord (1864–1938), American businessman and politician
- Sterling Lord (1922–2022), American literary agent, editor, and author
- Susan Lord, American engineer
- Thomas Lord (1755–1832), English professional cricketer
- Merlin Lord (born 1994), Programmer, philosopher
- Walter Lord (1917–2002), American writer and historian
- William Lord (disambiguation), various

== See also ==
- Laud
- Lords
