= James Lord =

James Lord may refer to:

- James Lord (author) (1922–2009), American writer
- James Lord (bobsleigh), American bobsledder
- James Lord (unionist) (born 1879), English-born American labor unionist
- James Brown Lord (1859–1902), American architect
- James S. Lord (1875–1932), Canadian politician
- Jim Lord (1948–2008), American lawyer and politician from Minnesota
- Jim Lord (singer-songwriter) (born 1948), American singer-songwriter
