= General Lord =

General Lord may refer to:

- Dick Lord (1936–2011), South African Air Force brigadier general
- Herbert Lord (1859–1930), U.S. Army brigadier general
- Lance W. Lord (born 1946), U.S. Air Force four-star general
- Royal B. Lord (1899–1963), U.S. Army major general
- William T. Lord (born c. 1955), U.S. Air Force lieutenant general
