= AFCYBER =

AFCYBER may refer to:

- Air Force Cyber Command (Provisional)
- Air Forces Cyber, the alignment of Sixteenth Air Force, the current US Air Force component of US Cyber Command
