= Gary Lord =

Gary Lord may refer to:

- Gary Lord (artist) (born 1952), American faux painting artist
- Gary Lord (rugby league) (born 1966), English rugby league footballer
- Gary Lord (swimmer) (born 1967), Australian freestyle swimmer
