= Lord Jim (disambiguation) =

Lord Jim may refer to:

- Lord Jim, a 1900 novel written by Joseph Conrad
  - Lord Jim (1925 film), a film based on the novel
  - Lord Jim (1965 film), a film based on the novel
- Lord Jim Wallace of Tankerness, Scottish politician
- "Lucky Lord Jim", a song by Doctor and the Medics from the 1986 album Laughing at the Pieces

== See also ==
- Jim Lord, Minnesotan lawyer
- Jim Lord (singer-songwriter)
- Lord Tim, Australian musician
