= Mocellini =

Mocellini is a surname. Notable people with the surname include:

- Renato Mocellini (1929–1985), Italian bobsledder
- Robert Mocellini, Italian bobsledder
- Sergio Mocellini (1936–2004), Italian bobsledder
- Simone Mocellini (born 1998), Italian cross-country skier
