= 917th Wing =

917th Wing

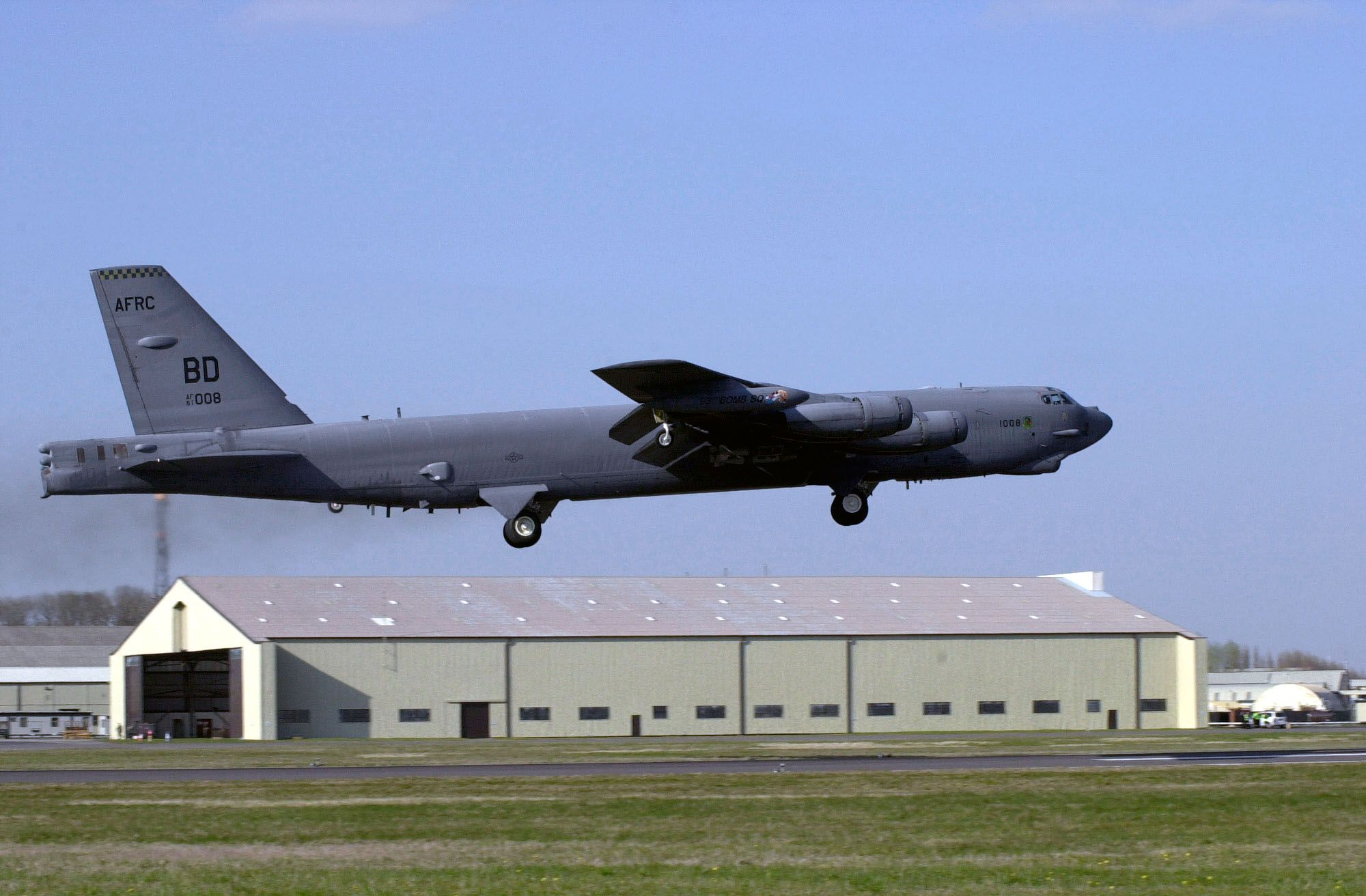
- 917th Wing B-52H in 2003
- Active: 1963-2011
- Country: United States
- Branch: United States Air Force
- Type: Fighter & Bomber
- Part of: Air Force Reserve Command
- Decorations: Air Force Outstanding Unit Award; Republic of Vietnam Gallantry Cross with Palm

Insignia
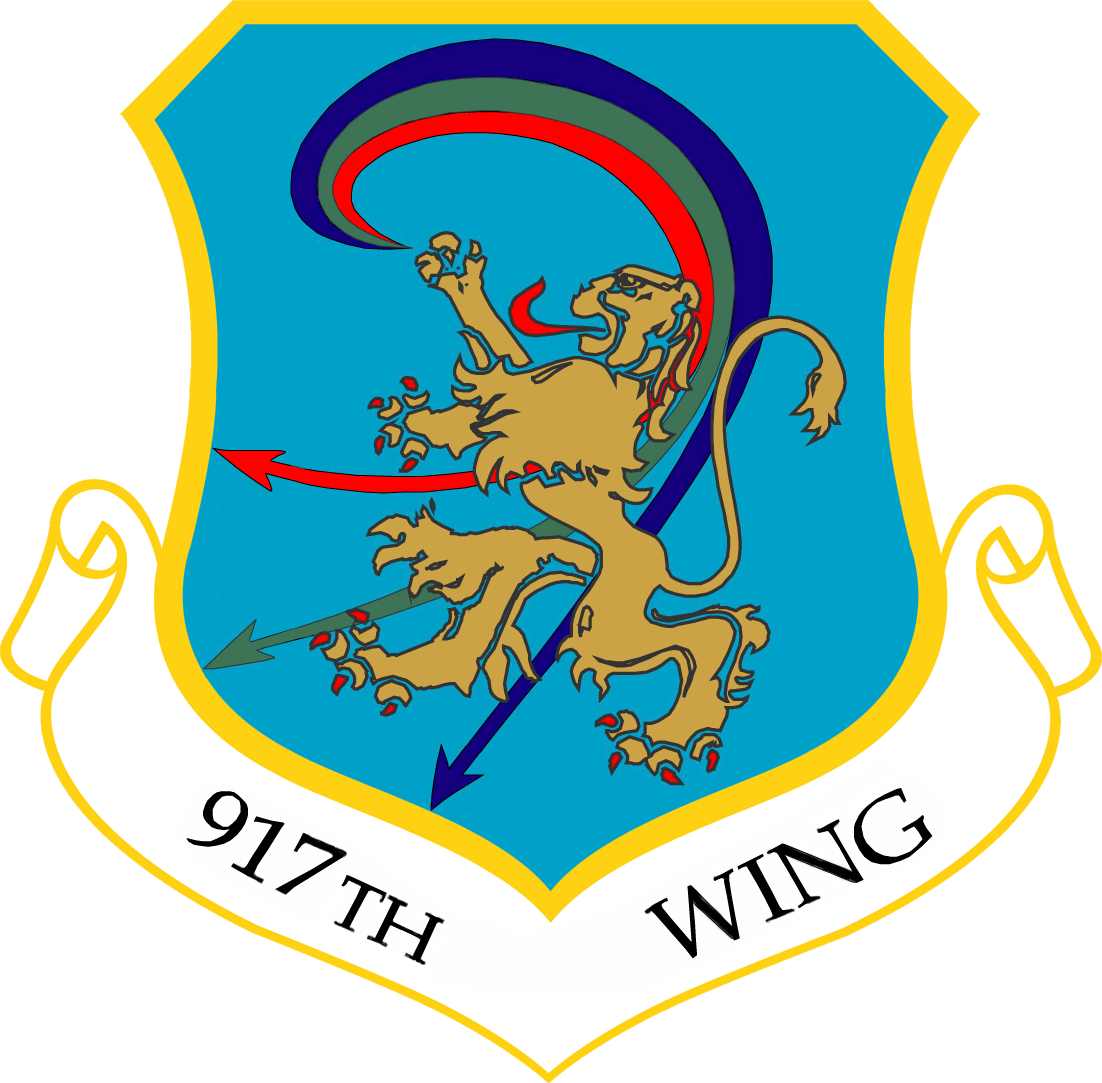
- 917th Wing emblem (Approved 16 November 1989)

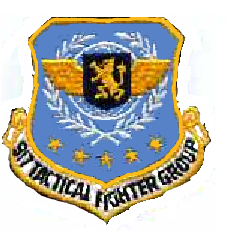
- 917th Tactical Fighter Group emblem

The 917th Wing is an inactive United States Air Force Reserve unit. It was last assigned to the Tenth Air Force, stationed at Barksdale Air Force Base, Louisiana. It was inactivated on 8 January 2011.

== History ==
=== Need for reserve troop carrier groups ===
During the first half of 1955, the Air Force began detaching Air Force Reserve squadrons from their parent wing locations to separate sites. The concept offered several advantages. Communities were more likely to accept the smaller squadrons than the large wings and the location of separate squadrons in smaller population centers would facilitate recruiting and manning. Continental Air Command (ConAC)'s plan called for placing Air Force Reserve units at fifty-nine installations located throughout the United States. When these relocations were completed in 1959, reserve wing headquarters and wing support elements would typically be on one base, along with one (or in some cases two) of the wing's flying squadrons, while the remaining flying squadrons were spread over thirty-five Air Force, Navy and civilian airfields under what was called the Detached Squadron Concept.

Although this dispersal was not a problem when the entire wing was called to active service, mobilizing a single flying squadron and elements to support it proved difficult. This weakness was demonstrated in the partial mobilization of reserve units during the Berlin Crisis of 1961 To resolve this, at the start of 1962, ConAC determined to reorganize its reserve wings by establishing groups with support elements for each of its troop carrier squadrons. This reorganization would facilitate mobilization of elements of wings in various combinations when needed. However, as this plan was entering its implementation phase, another partial mobilization occurred for the Cuban Missile Crisis, with the units being released on 22 November 1962. The formation of troop carrier groups occurred in January 1963 for units that had not been mobilized, but was delayed until February for those that had been.

=== Activation of 917th Troop Carrier Group ===
As a result, the 917th Troop Carrier Group was established at Barksdale Air Force Base, Louisiana on 17 January 1963, as the headquarters for the 78th Troop Carrier Squadron, which had been stationed there since March 1958. Along with group headquarters, a Combat Support Squadron, Materiel Squadron and a Tactical Infirmary were organized to support the 78th.

The group's mission was to organize, recruit and train Air Force Reserve personnel in the tactical airlift of airborne forces, their equipment and supplies and delivery of these forces and materials by airdrop, landing or cargo extraction systems. The group was equipped with Douglas C-124 Globemaster IIs for Military Air Transport Service long range airlift operations.

=== Special Operations ===
Became Special Operations group in 1972, flying Cessna A-37 Dragonfly; Tactical Fighter Group in 1973, receiving A-10 Thunderbolt II aircraft in 1981.

=== Composite Wing ===
The units of this Air Force Reserve Command (AFRC) wing was composed of the 45th and 47th Fighter Squadrons with their A-10s, and the 93d Bomb Squadron in the B-52H Formal Training Unit (FTU) mission and the 343d Bomb Squadron flying combat missions as an associate unit to the 2d Bomb Wing in the B-52H. The 917th's mission was to train pilots and crews to fly the A-10 and B-52H and perform strategic heavy bombardment and maritime operations with the B-52s. The Wing had approximately 1,600 Air Force Reserve personnel.

On 8 January 2011, Air Force Reserve Command inactivated the 917th Wing, transferring its B-52 units to the newly activated 307th Bomb Wing. The 917th Operations Group was re-designated as the 917th Fighter Group. The Group realigned under the 442d Fighter Wing, Whiteman AFB, Missouri. The assigned aircraft is the A-10 Thunderbolt II.

== Lineage ==
- Established as 917th Troop Carrier Group, Heavy and activated on 28 December 1962 (not organized)

Organized in the Reserve on 17 January 1963
Redesignated 917th Air Transport Group, Heavy on 1 December 1965
Redesignated 917th Military Airlift Group on 1 January 1966
Redesignated 917th Special Operations Group on 1 April 1972
Redesignated 917th Tactical Fighter Group on 1 October 1973
Redesignated 917th Tactical Fighter Wing on 1 July 1987
Redesignated 917th Fighter Wing on 1 February 1992
Redesignated 917th Wing on 1 October 1993
Inactivated on 8 January 2011

=== Assignments ===
- Continental Air Command, 28 December 1962 (not organized)
- 435th Troop Carrier Wing, 17 January 1963
- 442d Troop Carrier Wing, 1 July 1963
- 512th Troop Carrier Wing (later 512th Air Transport Wing, 512th Military Airlift Wing), 5 February 1965
- 446th Tactical Airlift Wing, 21 April 1971
- 434th Special Operations Wing (later 434th Tactical Fighter Wing), 25 February 1972
- Tenth Air Force, 1 July 1987 – 8 January 2011

=== Components ===
- 917th Operations Group: 1 August 1992 – 8 January 2011
- 926th Tactical Fighter Group (later 926th Fighter Group): 1 July 1987 – 1 August 1992
- 46th Tactical Fighter Training Squadron (later 46th Fighter Training Squadron): 30 September 1983 – 1 August 1992
- 47th Tactical Fighter Squadron: (later 47th Fighter Squadron) 1 October 1973 – 26 September 2013
- 78th Troop Carrier Squadron (later 78th Air Transport, 78th Military Airlift Squadron, 78th Special Operations Squadron): 17 January 1963 – 1 October 1973
- 93rd Bomb Squadron: 1 October 1993 – 8 January 2011

=== Stations ===
- Barksdale Air Force Base, Louisiana, 17 January 1963 – 8 January 2011

=== Aircraft ===
- Douglas C-124 Globemaster II, 1963-1972
- Cessna A-37 Dragonfly, 1972-1980
- Fairchild A-10 Thunderbolt II, 1980-2013
- Boeing B-52 Stratofortress, 1993-2011
