= 917th Fighter Group =

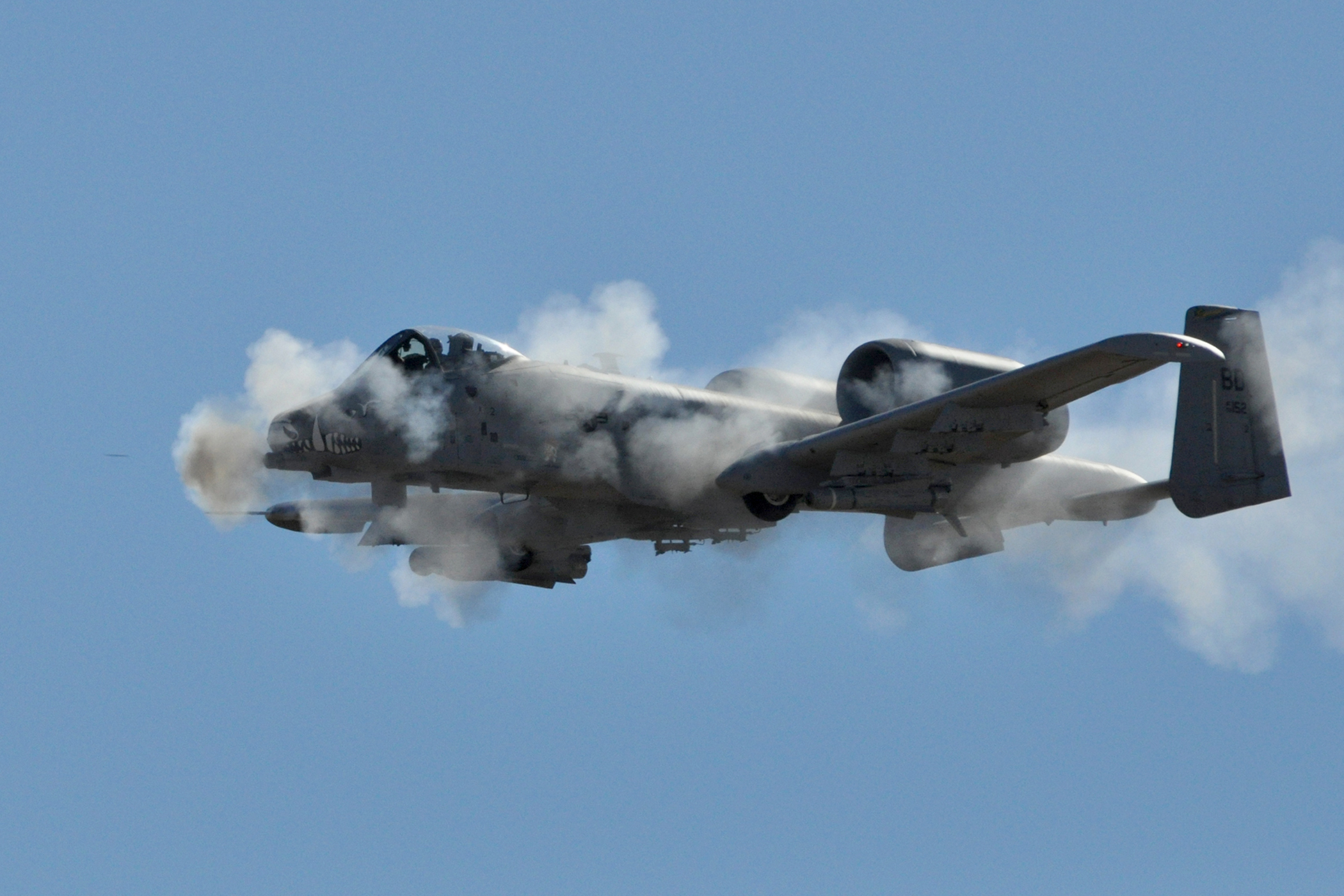
- 917th Fighter Group A-10 Thunderbolt II
- Active: 1 August 1992–2013
- Country: United States
- Branch: United States Air Force
- Type: Group
- Role: Attack
- Part of: Air Force Reserve Command
- Garrison/HQ: Barksdale Air Force Base, Louisiana
- Tail Code: "BD"

Insignia
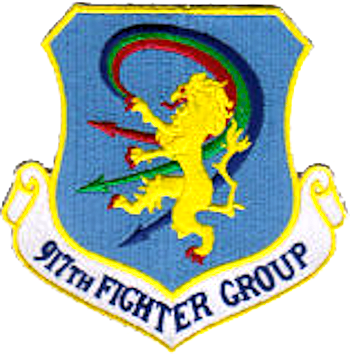
- 917th Fighter Group emblem

Aircraft flown
- Attack: A-10 Thunderbolt II

The 917th Fighter Group (917 FG) is an inactive Air Force Reserve Command (AFRC) unit that was last assigned to the 442d Fighter Wing, stationed at Barksdale Air Force Base, Louisiana.

== History ==
Trained to conduct close air support and battlefield interdiction. Provided Fairchild Republic A-10 Thunderbolt fighter training for reserve pilots until 1 Oct 1993 and after Oct 1996. Deployed A-10s and personnel to Italy to support NATO operations in the Balkans, 1993–1996.

Gained Boeing B-52 Stratofortress bombers and a bombardment mission in 1993. Transferred B-52 squadron to 307th Operations Group, 8 January 2011, inactivated 26 September 2013 and aircraft transferred to Davis-Monthan AFB, Arizona under the 924th Fighter Group.

=== Lineage ===
- Established as 917th Operations Group, and activated in the Reserve, on 1 August 1992

Re-designated: 917th Fighter Group, 13 January 2011
Inactivated 26 September 2013

=== Assignments ===
- 917th Fighter Wing (later Wing), 1 August 1992 – 13 January 2011
- 442d Fighter Wing, 13 January 2011 – 26 September 2013

=== Components ===
- 46th Fighter Training Squadron: 1 August 1992 – 1 October 1993
- 47th Fighter Squadron: 1 August 1992 – Present
- 93d Bomb Squadron: 1 October 1993 – 8 January 2011

=== Stations ===
- Barksdale AFB, Louisiana, 1 August 1992 – 26 September 2013

=== Aircraft ===
- A-10 Thunderbolt II
