= Barksdale Air Force Base =

- Bossier City, Louisiana in the United States
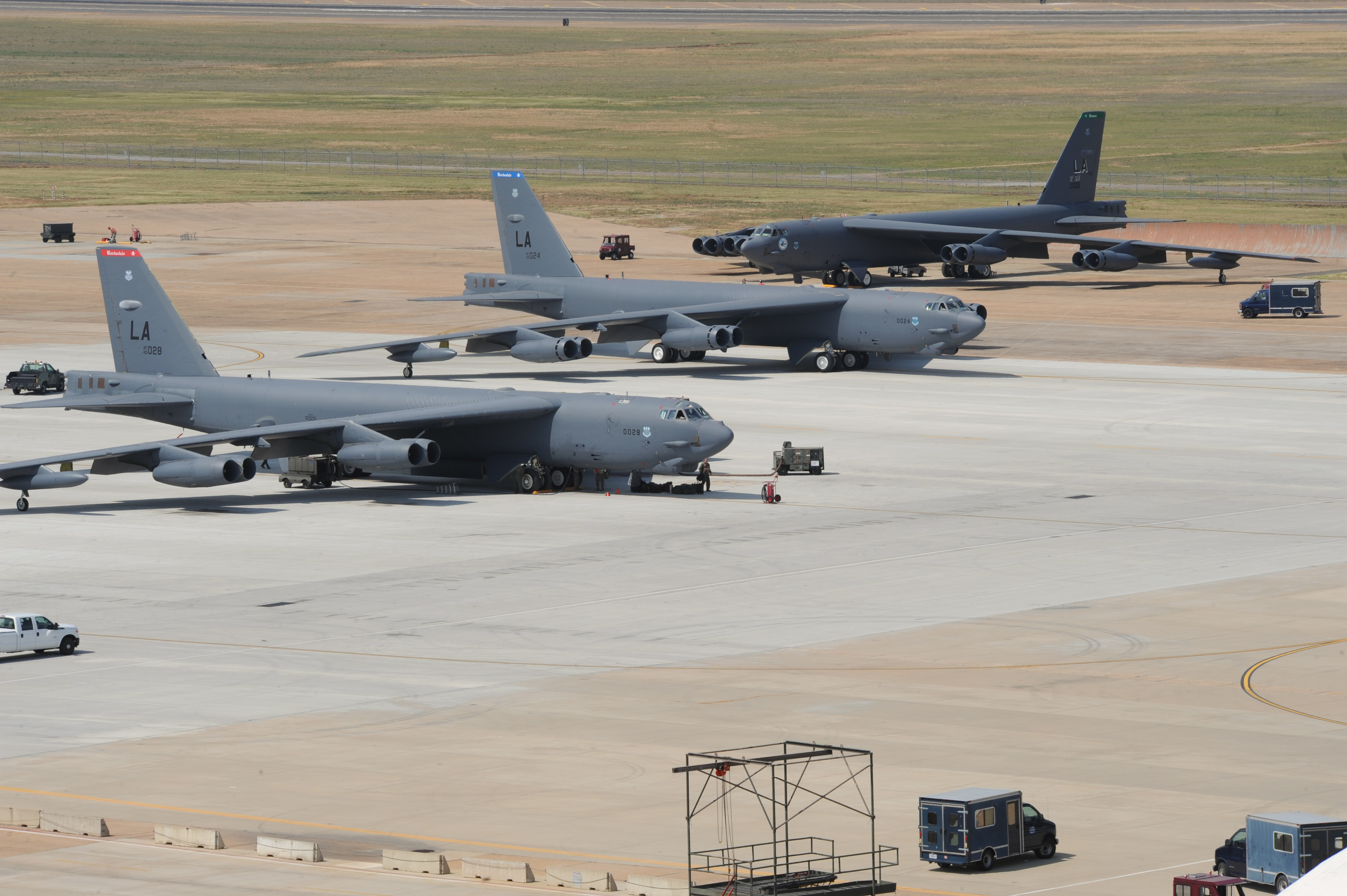
- Three Boeing B-52H Stratofortress bombers sit on the flight-line at Barksdale Air Force Base during 2012.

Site information
- Type: US Air Force base
- Owner: Department of Defense
- Operator: United States Air Force
- Controlled by: Air Force Global Strike Command
- Condition: Operational
- Website: http://www.barksdale.af.mil

Location
- Shown in United States
- Coordinates: 32°30′07″N 093°39′46″W

Site history
- Built: 1931–1933
- In use: 1933–present

Garrison information
- Current commander: Colonel Christopher G. Cain
- Garrison: 2nd Bomb Wing (Host); 307th Bomb Wing
- Occupants: 11th Bomb Squadron; 20th Bomb Squadron; 93rd Bomb Squadron; 96th Bomb Squadron; 343rd Bomb Squadron; See Based units section for full list.

Airfield information
- Identifiers: IATA: BAD, ICAO: KBAD, FAA LID: BAD, WMO: 722485
- Elevation: 50.2 metres (165 ft) AMSL
Runways
Direction	Length and surface
15/33	3,583.8 metres (11,758 ft) PEM

Barksdale Air Force Base (Barksdale AFB) (IATA: BAD, ICAO: KBAD, FAA LID: BAD) is a United States Air Force (USAF) base in Bossier Parish, northwest Louisiana. Much of the base is within the city limits of Bossier City, Louisiana, along the base's western and northwestern edge. Barksdale AFB occupies more than 22,000 acres (8,900 ha) east of Bossier City and along the southern edge of Interstate 20. More than 15,000 active-duty and Air Force Reserve Command (AFRC) members serve at Barksdale.

The host unit at Barksdale is the 2nd Bomb Wing (2 BW), the oldest bomb wing in the USAF. It is assigned to the Air Force Global Strike Command's (AFGSC) Eighth Air Force (8 AF). Equipped with about 44 Boeing B-52H Stratofortress bombers, The 2nd Bomb Wing provides flexible, responsive global combat capability and trains all AFGSC and AFRC B-52 Stratofortress crews.

The base was established in 1932 as Barksdale Field, named for World War I aviator and test pilot Lieutenant Eugene Hoy Barksdale (1896–1926).

== Role and operations ==
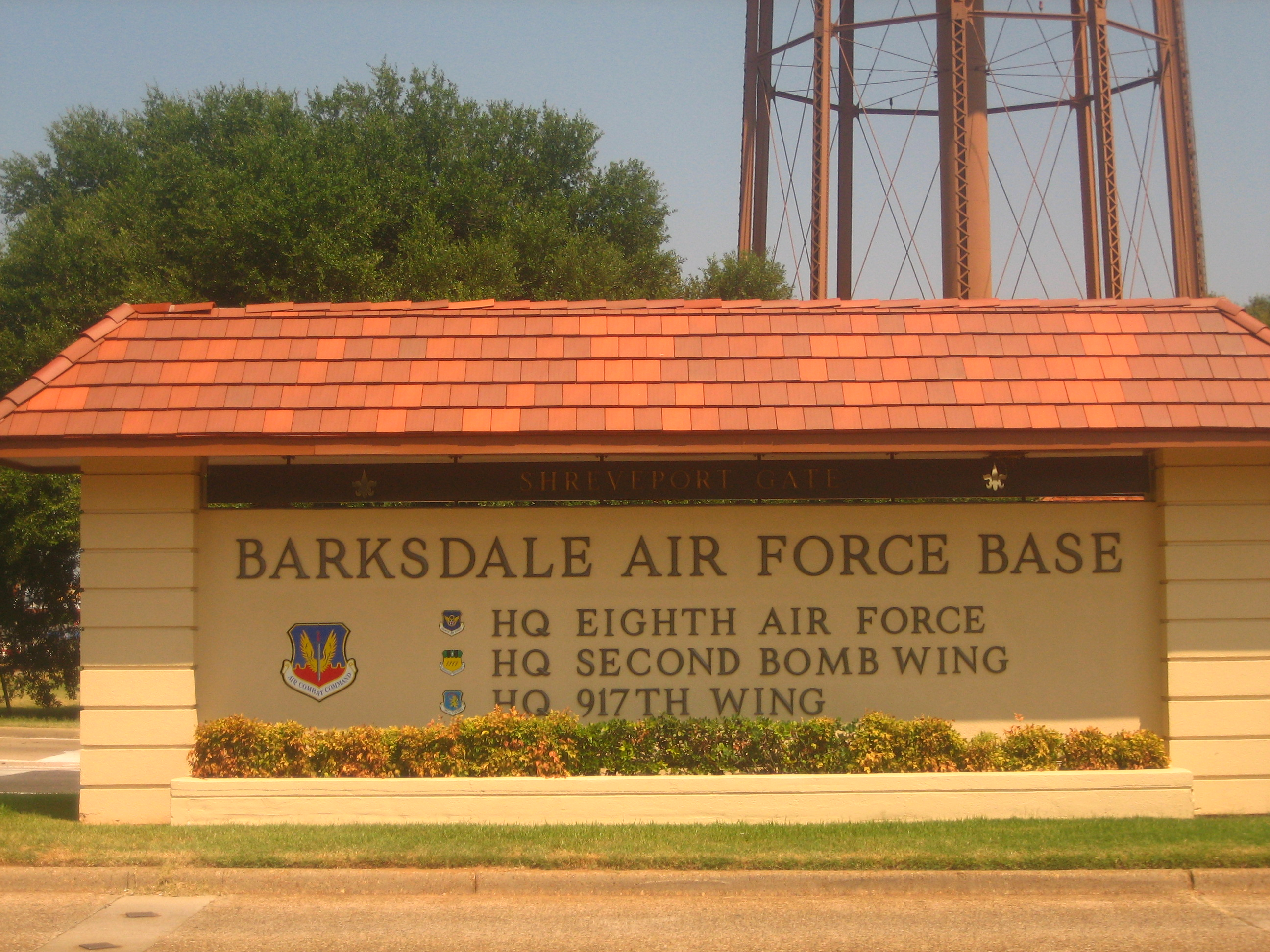
Entrance to Barksdale Air Force Base

Units at Barksdale include the oldest bomb wing in the USAF, the 2nd Bomb Wing (2 BW). The 2nd participated in Brig Gen Billy Mitchell's 1921 off-shore bombing test (as the 2nd Bomb Group).F

Components of the 2nd Bomb Wing are:

- 2nd Operations Group (Tail Code: "LA")
  - 11th Bomb Squadron (Boeing B-52H Stratofortress) "Mr. Jiggs", Gold Tail Stripe
  - 20th Bomb Squadron (B-52H) "Buccaneers", Blue Tail Stripe
  - 96th Bomb Squadron (B-52H) "Devil's Own", Red Tail Stripe
  - 2nd Operations Support Squadron
- 2nd Mission Support Group
- 2nd Maintenance Group
- 2nd Medical Group

The commander of the 2nd Bomb Wing is Colonel Michael A. Miller. He also functions as the installation commander of Barksdale Air Force Base. The vice commander is Colonel Scott Weyermuller.

Other assigned units at Barksdale are:

- Air Force Global Strike Command
- Headquarters, Eighth Air Force
- 307th Bomb Wing (Air Force Reserve Command) (Tail Code: "BD")
  - 93rd Bomb Squadron (B-52H) "Indian Outlaws", Blue/Gold Chex Tail Stripe
  - 343rd Bomb Squadron (B-52H)
- 49th Test and Evaluation Squadron
- Det 13 ACC TRSS
- 8th Information Warfare Flight
- 26th Operational Weather Squadron

The base is closed to the public. However, the base is home to the Barksdale Global Power Museum, which hosts static displays of numerous aircraft including a Royal Air Force Avro Vulcan bomber, Consolidated B-24 Liberator, Boeing B-17 Flying Fortress, North American P-51 Mustang, Lockheed SR-71 Blackbird, General Dynamics F-111 Aardvark, and multiple versions of the Boeing B-52 Stratofortress. There is an annual open house when non-Department of Defense visitors are allowed. Visitors may also tour the museum from 9:30 am to 4 pm every day except official holidays.

== History ==
- Barksdale Field Historic District
- U.S. National Register of Historic Places
- U.S. Historic district
- Pictured c. 1941, from the American Guide Series

- Location within Louisiana
- Location: Junction of US 71 and West Gate Drive, Bossier City, Louisiana
- Coordinates: 32°30′11″N 93°40′48″W
- Area: 225 acres (91 ha)
- Built: 1931
- Architectural style: French Revival
- NRHP reference No.: 92000332
- Added to NRHP: 13 April 1992

=== Origins ===
In 1927, the United States Army Air Corps was looking for a location to house an expansion for the Third Attack Group, then in Fort Crockett, Texas. Shreveport joined in the running to get a base in its area, alongside 80 other cities. Shreveporters John D. Ewing and Andrew Querbes led a group to Washington D.C. advocating for the base to be in the area, suggesting a location near Cross Lake. In 1928, Captain Harold R. Harris was hired to find locations in the area suitable for an airfield. Harris selected a cotton field in Bossier Parish. The War Department chose that area because they preferred it over Cross Lake, as well as because of hostility from governor Huey Long against Caddo Parish and Shreveport for opposing his education reforms.

22,000 acres of land was acquired from 800 property owners in Bossier Parish by the City of Shreveport, who annexed it on a voter-approved municipal bond of US$1,500,000 (equivalent to $28,125,000 in 2025) and then donated it to the federal government. On 4 December 1930, the Army began work on the base, with Norfleet Giddings Bone serving as architect. The construction project was the then-largest airfield in the world. The 20th Pursuit Group moved in from Mather Field, California in 1932 with its three pursuit squadrons equipped with the Boeing P-12 and Boeing P-26 Peashooter. The field was dedicated on February 2, 1933, and the 3rd Attack Wing arrived in the mid-1930s. During World War Two, Free French and Nationalist Chinese air crews trained at Barksdale. The base was also home to the Air Training Command beginning in 1945.

By the mid-1930s, Barksdale Field was the headquarters and main base of the 3rd Attack Wing, equipped with the Curtiss A-12 Shrike and Northrop A-17. The airfield was used by both fighter and attack pilots to hone their gunnery and bombing skills. Additional barracks were constructed 1936–1937, and light bombers replaced pursuit and attack aircraft.

Technically, Barksdale AFB is neither in Bossier City nor Shreveport but, like all military bases, is an autonomous community with its own infrastructure. However, the base obtains its water from the Shreveport Water system, with a connection to the Bossier City Water System as a backup supply of water in case the Shreveport system is undergoing maintenance or emergency situations.

=== Name ===
Barksdale Field was named in honor of 2nd Lieutenant Eugene Hoy Barksdale (1895–1926) on 2 February 1933. Lt. Barksdale received his wings in Great Britain in 1918 and flew with the British Royal Flying Corps during World War I. He died on 11 August 1926, over McCook Field near Dayton, Ohio, while testing a Douglas O-2 observation airplane for spin characteristics. He did not recover from a flat spin, and while bailing out of the plane his parachute was caught in the wing's brace wires, causing Barksdale to fall to his death. He was buried with full military honors in Arlington National Cemetery.

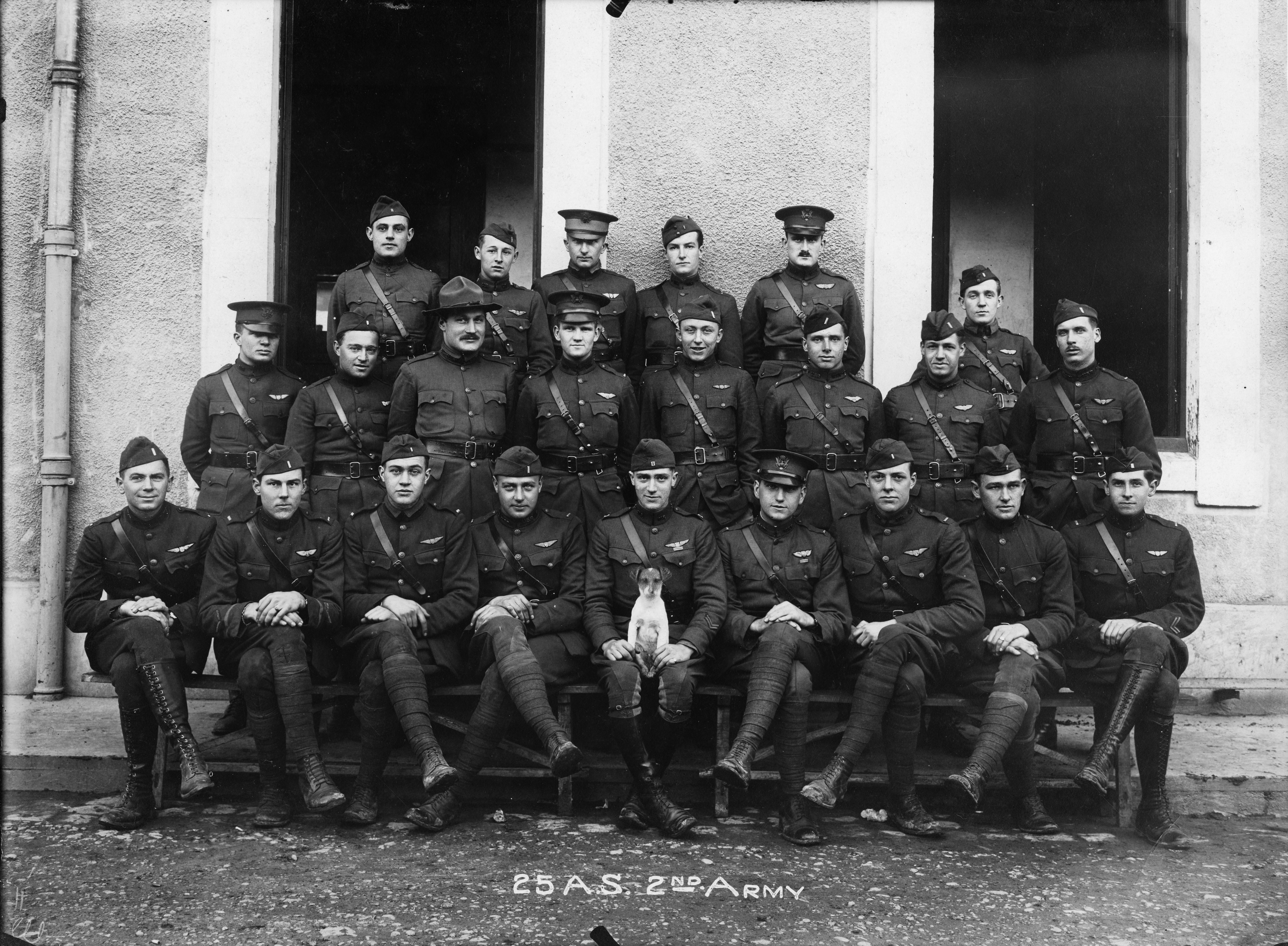
25th AS, Lt Barksdale pictured (bottom row, 2nd from left)

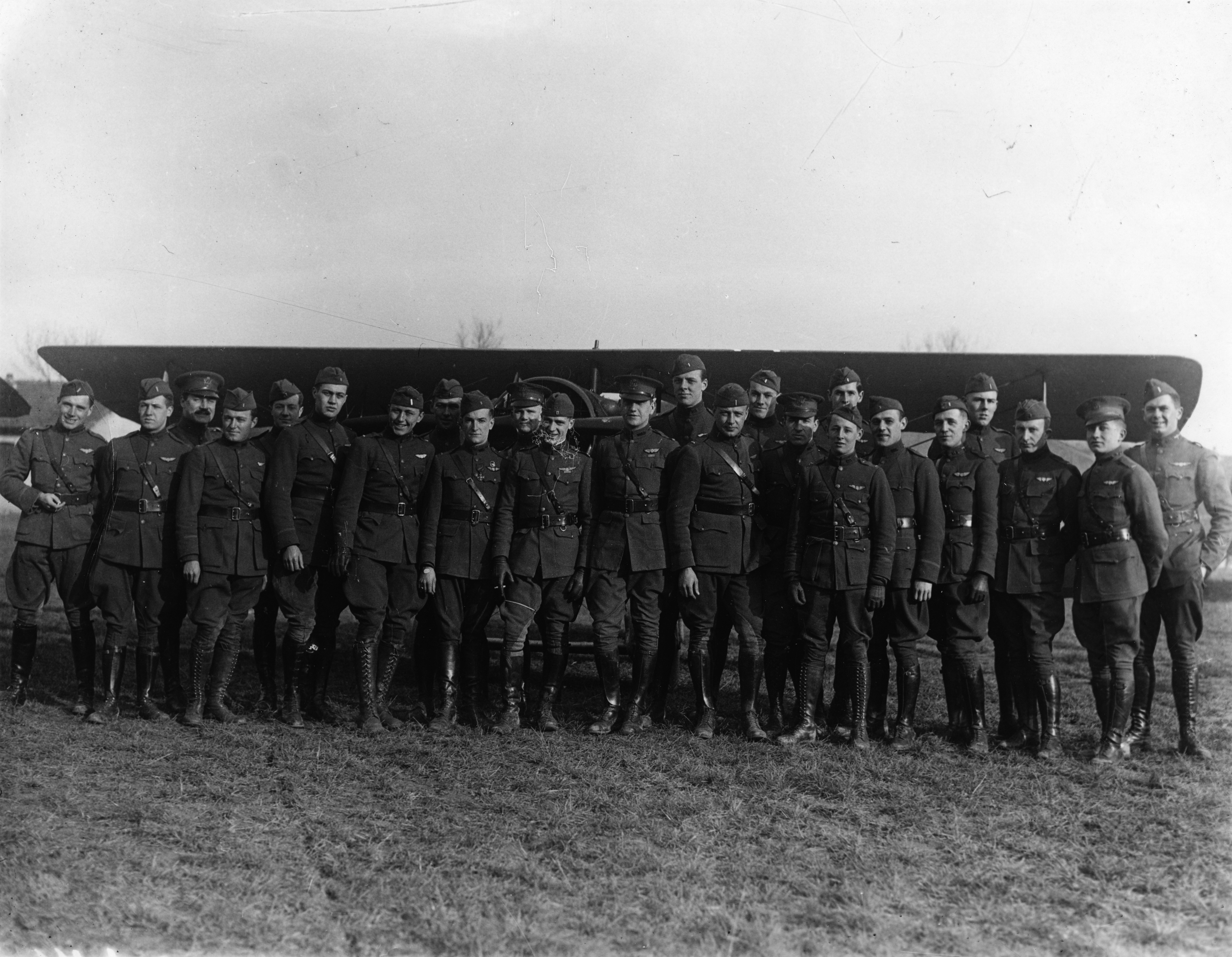
25th AS, Lt Barksdale pictured (fourth from right, back row)

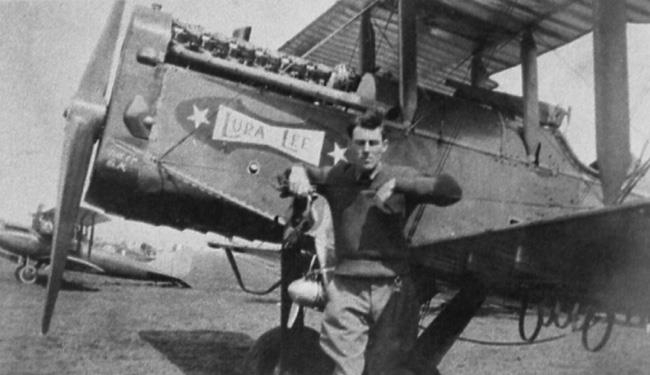
Lt Barksdale, date unknown

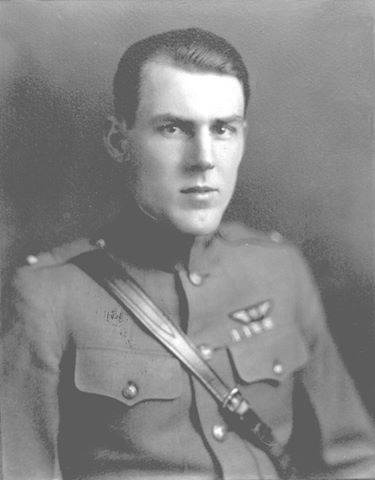
Lt Barksdale, date unknown

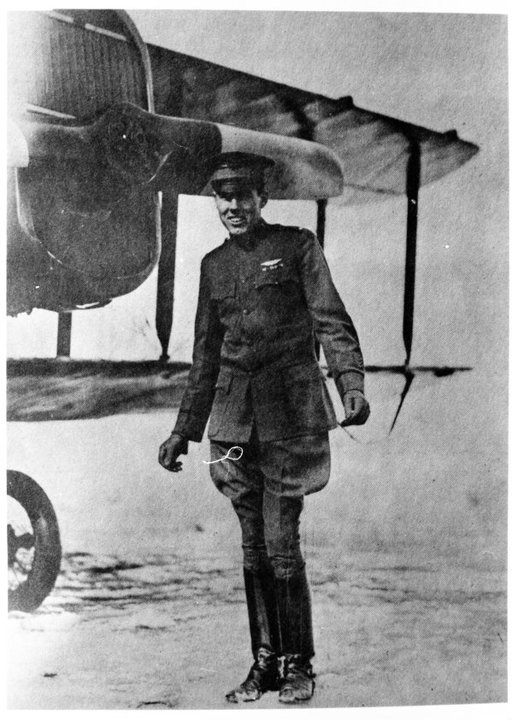
Lt Barksdale, date unknown

The name of the airfield was changed to Barksdale Air Force Base on 13 February 1948, concurrent with the establishment of the United States Air Force as a separate military branch. Airships were still in use when field construction began, so Hangars One and Two were built large enough to accommodate them. No airships were ever assigned, but each hangar was large enough to accommodate two Boeing B-52 Stratofortress bombers wingtip to wingtip, which proved invaluable for Big Belly and Pacer Plank modifications managed by Boeing's Wichita plant between 1965 and 1973. Half of the B-52Fs were deployed from Barksdale, but never returned, as they were replaced by B-52Gs after the Vietnam War.

==== World War II ====
Barksdale was developed as an Air Corps flying school November 1940 and the runway apron was completed mid-1941. Between 23 and 25 May 1940, Barksdale Field was host to the Army's "complete military maneuvers" simulating European combat operations. Some 320 aircraft from throughout the Army Air Corps participated, as Major General Dwight D. Eisenhower watched. General George C. Marshall, the Chief of Staff of the United States Army, also briefly visited Barksdale Field during the latter stages of the maneuvers.

During World War II, the airfield trained replacement crews and entire units between 1942 and 1945. Known units that trained at Barksdale were:

- 27th Bombardment Group (Light) 1 February 1940 – 7 October 1940 (Douglas A-24 Dauntless)
- 8th Pursuit Group 5 September 1941 – 7 October 1941 (Curtiss P-40 Warhawk)
- 46th Bombardment Group (Light) 2 February 1942 – 1 April 1942 (Douglas A-20 Havoc)
- 44th Bombardment Group (Heavy) February 1942 – July 1942 (Consolidated B-24 Liberator)
- 98th Bombardment Group (Heavy) February 1942 – 30 March 1942 (Consolidated B-24 Liberator)
- 92nd Bombardment Group (Heavy) 1 March 1942 – 26 March 1942 (Boeing B-17 Flying Fortress)
- 93rd Bombardment Group (Heavy) 1 March 1942 – 15 May 1942 (Consolidated B-24 Liberator)
- 90th Bombardment Group (Heavy) 17 May 1942 – 21 June 1942 (Consolidated B-24 Liberator)
- 17th Bombardment Group (Medium) 23 June 1942 – November 1942 (Martin B-26 Marauder)
- 95th Bombardment Group (Heavy) 15 June 1942 – 26 June 1942 (Boeing B-17 Flying Fortress)
- 100th Bombardment Group (Heavy): 18 June 1942 – 26 June 1942 (Boeing B-17 Flying Fortress)
- 319th Bombardment Group (Medium): 26 June 1942 – 8 August 1942 (Martin B-26 Marauder)
- 321st Bombardment Group (Medium) 26 June 1942 – 1 August 1942 (North American B-25 Mitchell)

The 335th Bombardment Group (Medium) took over training duties as a permanent Operational Training Unit (OTU) on 17 July 1942 with Martin B-26 Marauders. On 1 May 1944, the 335th was replaced by the 331st U.S. Army Air Forces (USAAF) Base Unit as the OTU, being subsequently replaced by the 2621st USAAF Base Unit on 1 December 1945. The 2621st provided pilot training until 26 September 1947, when it was inactivated and replaced by the 2621st Air Force Base Unit.

Also during World War II Barksdale played host to the major contingent of the Free French Air Forces and Nationalist Chinese aircrews.

=== Postwar years ===
Barksdale Field was renamed Barksdale Air Force Base on 13 January 1948, with the designation of the United States Air Force as a separate service in 1947.

In the postwar year of the 1940s, Barksdale then became headquarters for the Air Training Command from 1945 to 1949. The 47th Bombardment Wing, Light, equipped first with the Douglas B-26 Invader was assigned on 19 November 1948, from Biggs Field for transitioning to the North American B-45 Tornado. The B-45 was the USAF's first operational jet bomber and the first jet aircraft to be refueled in the air. The first B-45As began arriving in December 1948, with the wing accepting 96 aircraft by March 1950.

Due to budget reductions in the B-45 program, the air force planned to inactivate the 47th Bomb Wing and transfer its B-45s and personnel to Yokota Air Base, Japan so Far East Air Forces could benefit from the know-how gained by the 47th at Barksdale. However the costs of moving the aircraft to Japan were substantial, as the range of the B-45 was insufficient to fly from California to Hawaii and the aircraft could not be equipped with external fuel tanks. Initial use of the B-45 at Barksdale also showed that the aircraft was not truly operational, with ineffective fire control and bombing systems along with structural weaknesses developing on the aircraft already in use. In addition, each engine had to be inspected after only 7 1/2 hours of use. If found serviceable, it could be only flown another 7 1/2 hours before a total overhaul was necessary. It was determined that the aircraft simply could not be deployed overseas and put into operational use. It took almost two years until Air Materiel Command could work out these issues and have the 47th Bomb Wing's aircraft ready for operational use.

The 47th Bomb Wing was assigned to NATO and was reassigned first to Langley Air Force Base, Virginia, in March 1951, then afterwards to RAF Sculthorpe, England, arriving in the UK on 1 May 1951. With the departure of the 47th, Barksdale phased out bomber crew training.

U.S. Representative Joe Waggonner, worked successfully to keep Barksdale open during his time in Congress. Through his efforts, Barksdale survived base closures that occurred elsewhere across the nation.

=== Cold War ===
On 1 November 1949, Barksdale was reassigned to Strategic Air Command (SAC), and became home of Headquarters Second Air Force. Barksdale remained a SAC base for nearly the next half-century. However, with the change of commands, the mission of Barksdale initially remained that of a training base where units were formed and organized, then were reassigned to front-line operational bases.

==== 91st Strategic Reconnaissance Wing ====
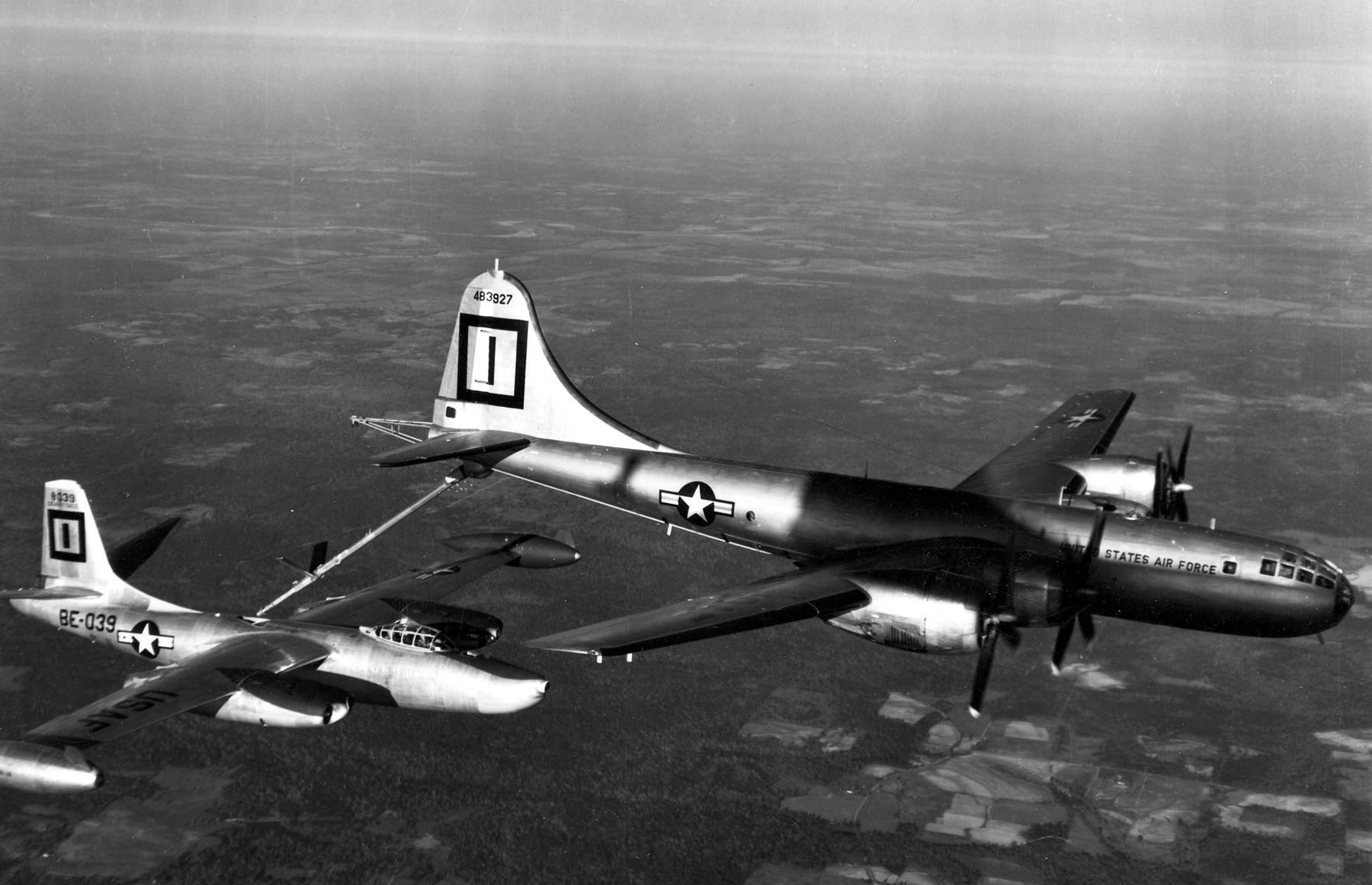
91 SRW North American RB-45C Tornado AF Ser. No. 48-0039 being refueled by a 91 SRW Bell-Atlanta B-29B-45-BA Superfortress AF Ser. No. 44-83927 (in KB-29P configuration)

The first SAC unit at Barksdale was the 91st Strategic Reconnaissance Wing was reassigned to the base from McGuire Air Force Base on 1 October. The mission of the 91st was to provide global strategic reconnaissance, with emphasis on aerial photography and mapping.

The 91st was equipped with a myriad of aircraft, including versions of the Boeing RB/TRB-17 Flying Fortress; Boeing RB/TB/TRB-29 Superfortress; Douglas RC-54 Skymaster; Boeing B/RB-50 Superfortress, and the North American RB-45 Tornado.

The 91st maintained operational detachments of aircraft and crews drawn from several components to provide reconnaissance support in overseas areas, including the United Kingdom and locations in North Africa. Deployments would be routine and last for about three months.

When the Korean War broke out in 1950, a three-plane detachment from the wing flew to Johnson Air Base, Japan to provide the Far East Air Forces commander improved reconnaissance capability. The 91st Strategic Reconnaissance Squadron remained in Japan for the duration of the war and flew reconnaissance missions over North Korea and the Sea of Japan. The wing also sent a detachment of RB-29 refueling aircraft, and conducted the first aerial refueling under combat conditions when a KB-29P refueled an RC-45C over North Korea in July 1951

With the arrival of the 376th Bomb wing in October 1951, the decision was made to reassign the 91st. On 16 June 1952 the 91st was reassigned to Lockbourne Air Force Base, Ohio.

==== 301st Bombardment Wing ====
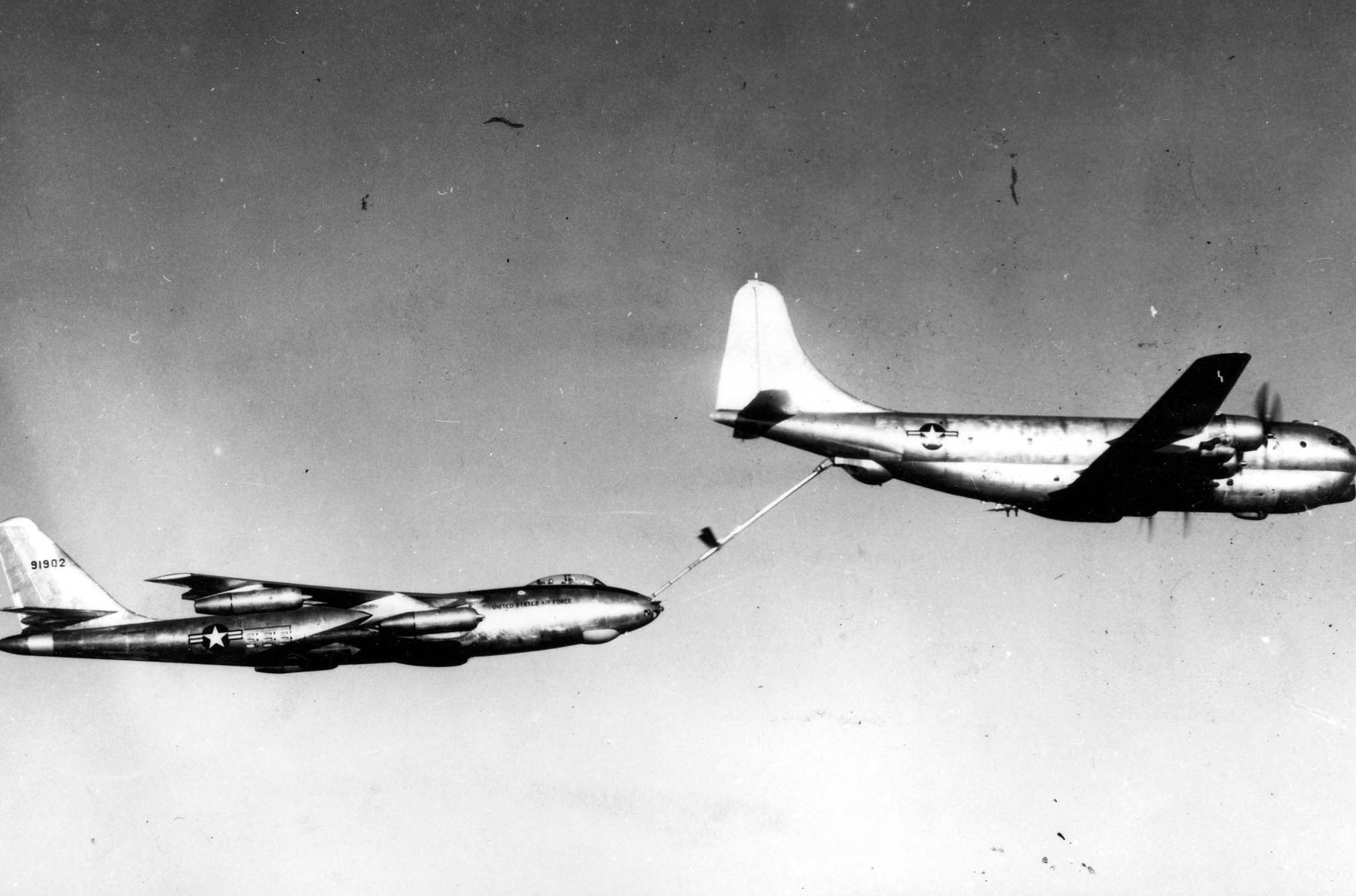
Boeing B-47A Stratojet AF Serial No. 49-1902 refueled by Boeing KC-97

The 301st Bombardment Wing joined the 91st SRW at Barksdale on 7 November 1949, being transferred from Smoky Hill Air Force Base, Kansas, where it was reactivated the year before. Both wings operated a joint integrated headquarters although each wing continued tactical operations independently.

Initially flying the B-29 Superfortress, after arriving at Barksdale the 301st was one of the first units to conduct aerial refueling operations with the KB-29 tanker version of the Superfortress. The wing converted to the Boeing B-47 Stratojet in 1953 and traded in its KB-29 tankers for the upgraded Boeing KC-97 Stratofreighter.

The mission of the 301st was to train for strategic bombing missions and to conduct aerial refueling. The wing deployed to England in 1953 and to French Morocco in 1954.

It was reassigned to Lockbourne Air Force Base, Ohio, on 15 April 1958 where it became an electronic countermeasures (ECM) unit and was engaged in various clandestine intelligence missions.

To provide air defense for the base, the U.S. Army established the Barksdale Defense Area in 1959 and constructed Nike Hercules surface-to-air missile sites for air defense. Sites were located near Bellevue (N.E. of Shreveport) (BD-10) 32°40′28″N 093°30′34″W, and Stonewall (BD-50) 32°17′39″N 093°47′17″W in Louisiana. The unit involved may have been from the 562nd Air Defense Artillery Regiment. They were operational between November 1960 and March 1966 when they were inactivated as part of the reduction of the air defenses in the United States against aircraft.

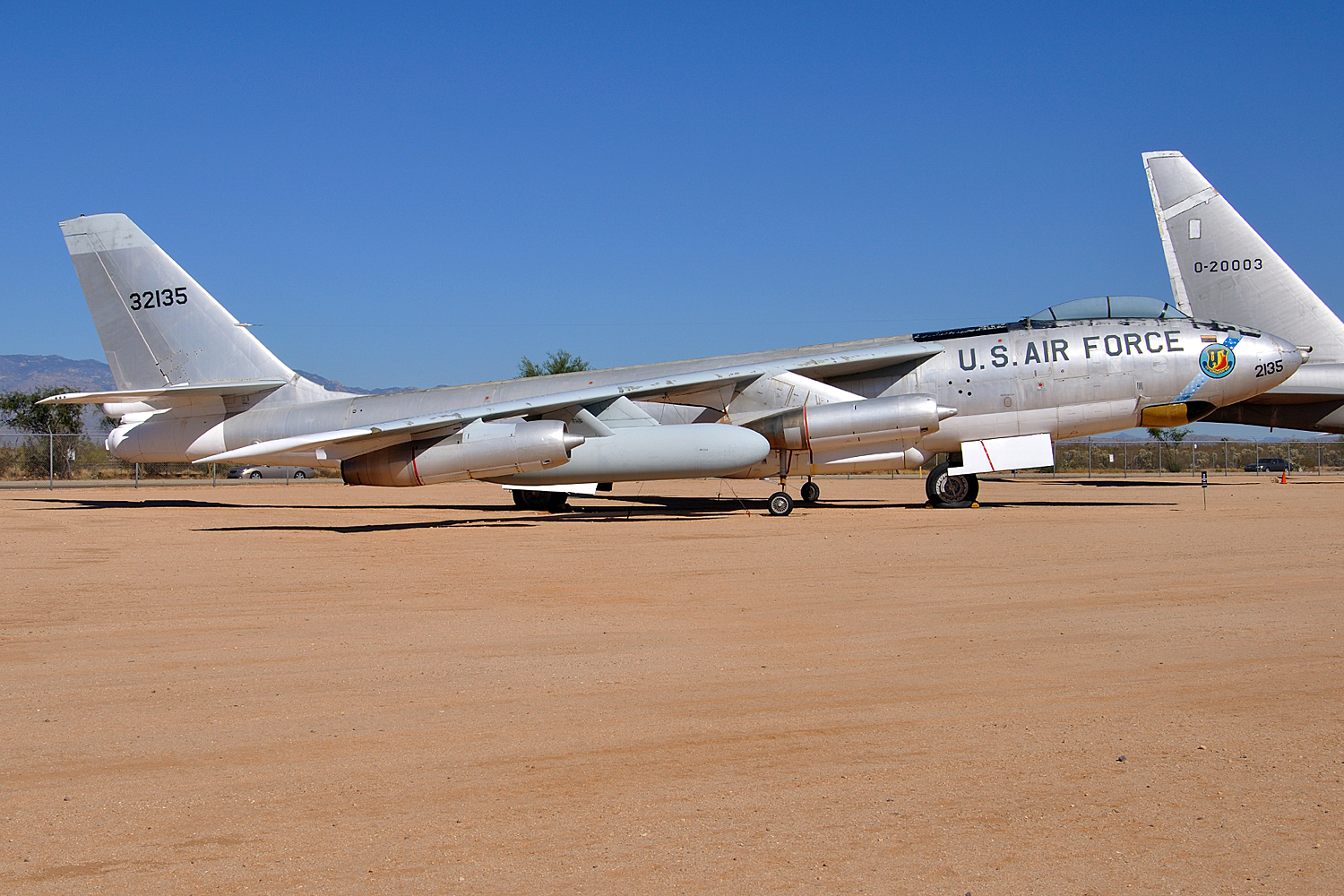
Boeing EB-47E Stratojet in markings of the 376th Bombardment Wing

==== 376th Bombardment Wing ====
On 10 October 1951 the 376th Bombardment Wing was reassigned to Barksdale from Forbes Air Force Base, Kansas. Initially equipped with obsolescent B-29 Superfortresses, the 514th Bombardment Squadron trained to drop A-bombs until the wing upgraded to the Boeing B-47 Stratojet bomber in June 1953 which took over the A-bomb duty. The 376th began flying EB-47 Stratojets in 1954 for ECM operations, which became the wing's primary mission in September 1953.

The wing was reassigned to Lockbourne Air Force Base on 1 December 1957 where it replaced and absorbed the personnel and assets of the 91st Strategic Reconnaissance Wing and was redesignated the 376th Bombardment Wing (ECM), flying EB-47E Stratojets.

==== 4238th Strategic Wing ====
Following the transfer 301st and 378th Bomb Wings in 1957 and 1958 respectively, Barksdale was slated to receive Boeing's newest pair of strategic aircraft: the Boeing B-52 Stratofortress and the Boeing KC-135 Stratotanker. The mission of Barksdale was also changed from being a SAC training base to a front-line operational base.

It received its new aircraft and mission in the form of the 4238th Strategic Wing which was a derivative of the 7th Bomb Wing from Carswell Air Force Base, Texas. The 4238th was equipped with the B-52F and KC-135A strategic tankers that were assigned to Barksdale. Its units consisted of the 436th Bomb Squadron and 913th Air Refueling Squadron.

It was assigned to Barksdale on 3 May 1958 as part of SAC's plan to disperse its big bombers over a larger number of bases, thus making it more difficult for the Soviet Union to knock out the entire fleet with a surprise first strike. The 436th Bomb Squadron consisted of 15 aircraft. Half of the planes were maintained on fifteen-minute alert, fully fueled, armed, and ready for combat. The remaining planes were used for training in bombardment missions and air refueling operations. MSgt Jack Barfield was the Base Sergeant w/BDAS in 1961 and the First Sergeant of the 4238th starting in 1962.

===== 1st Combat Evaluation Group =====
The 1st Combat Evaluation Group (1961–1990) reporting directly to the Deputy Commander of Operations, Strategic Air Command Headquarters, Offutt Air Force Base, Nebraska, to provide command level standardization/evaluation of SAC aircrews, radar scoring of simulated bombing activity by SAC aircraft; and contingency warfare support of ground-directed bombing, with detachments in Southeast Asia during the Vietnam War. In 1990, part of the 1CEVG became the 99 Electronic Combat Range Group and was the 99th Range Group became part of the Nellis Air Force Base 98th Range Wing in 1995.

==== 2nd Bombardment Wing ====
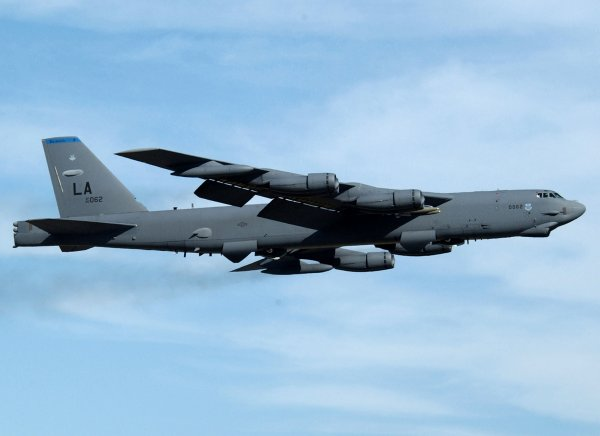
Boeing B-52H-160-BW of the 20th Bomb Squadron

The 4238th Strategic Wing was phased out on 1 April 1963. The 2nd Bombardment Wing, Heavy was reassigned without equipment or personnel to Barksdale from Hunter AFB, Georgia. taking over the B-52 and KC-135 mission from the 4238th Strategic Wing. The aircraft and crews remained at the base, but the wing (and its bomb squadron) were given new designations, the 20th Bombardment Squadron and 913th Air Refueling Squadron. The 2nd Bomb Wing under various designations, has been the host unit at Barksdale for over 40 years. The 20th retained the B-52Fs until being transferred in June 1965 to the 7th Bomb Wing at Carswell Air Force Base. It was replaced by the 62nd Bomb Squadron, which flew the B-52G which was reassigned from the inactivating 39th Bombardment Wing at Eglin Air Force Base, Florida. A second "G" squadron, the 596th Bomb Squadron was reassigned to Barksdale in April 1968 from the 397th Bombardment Wing at Dow Air Force Base, Maine.

During the Vietnam War, the 2nd Bomb Wing deployed to Southeast Asia for "Arc Light" and "Young Tiger", including use B-52G in Operation Linebacker and Operation Linebacker II raids of 1972–1973 at the end of the war. In addition to the Motorola SST-181 X Band Beacon Transponder for Combat Skyspot, the B-52G had onboard ECM for protection against enemy surface-to-air missiles. In the latter stages of Linebacker II, some of the B-52Gs were diverted in-flight to targets deemed to be less dangerous. All aircraft and crews returned to Barksdale in January and October 1973.

=== Post-Vietnam era ===
From 1973 to 1992, Barksdale hosted the annual Strategic Air Command Bombing and Navigation Competition and awards symposium. After spending weeks dropping bombs on ranges throughout the United States and engaging in navigational competition, SAC's finest bomber and tanker aircrews gathered here for the score posting and awards presentation, and to work together to improve the training of SAC aircrews.

Headquarters Second Air Force was inactivated on 1 January 1975, being replaced by Headquarters Eighth Air Force, which was transferred to Barksdale after being located at Andersen Air Force Base, Guam for five years in charge of SAC strategic operations for the Vietnam War. At Barksdale, the Eighth took over the operations and personnel of the inactivated Second Air Force.

In 1978, the Eighth Air Force Museum was established at Barksdale with the arrival of a Boeing B-17 Flying Fortress of the type the "Mighty Eighth" flew during World War II. The museum has grown greatly over the years, and today its collection includes the Consolidated B-24 Liberator, Boeing B-29 Superfortress, Boeing B-47 Stratojet, Boeing B-52D and G Stratofortresses, British Avro Vulcan B.Mk2, General Dynamics FB-111A, Beechcraft C-45 Expeditor, Douglas C-47 Skytrain, Noorduyn UC-64A Norseman, Boeing KC-97 Stratofreighter, Boeing KC-135 Stratotanker, North American P-51D/F-51D Mustang, Republic F-84F Thunderstreak, Mikoyan-Gurevich MiG-21F, Lockheed T-33 Shooting Star and Lockheed SR-71 Blackbird.

Barksdale's 32nd Air Refueling Squadron received the first operational McDonnell Douglas KC-10A Extender aerial tanker in November 1981. The 32nd ARS was reassigned to the 458th Operations Group on 1 June 1992 and to the 305th Operations Group on 1 July 1995. The 71st ARS was reassigned to the 458th Operations Group at McGuire Air Force Base, New Jersey. Barksdale's last KC-135 was placed in the Eighth Air Force Museum after its final flight in March 1994 and the last KC-10 departed for McGuire Air Force Base in October.

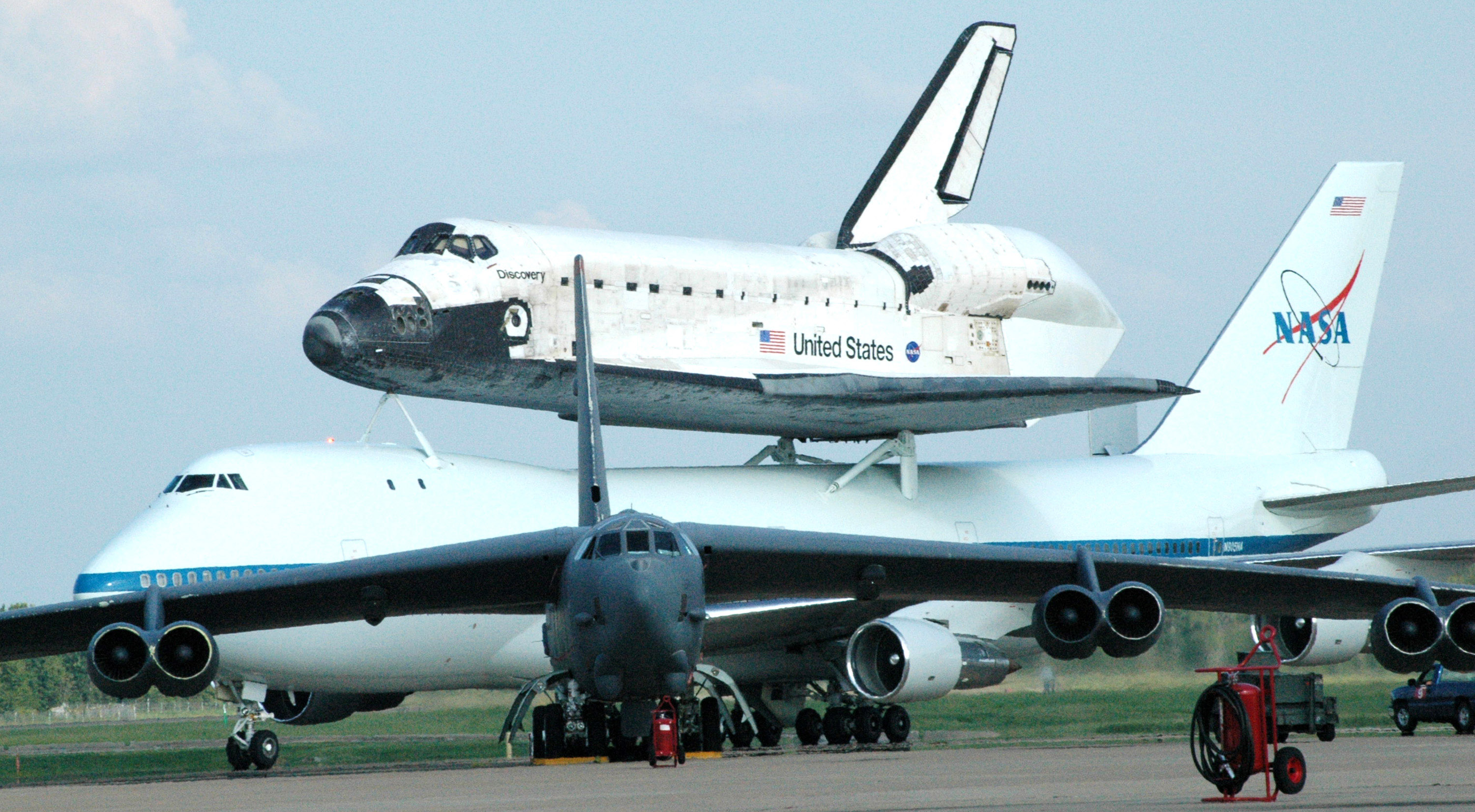
Space Shuttle Discovery stops at Barksdale on its way to the Kennedy Space Center

In April 1982, and again in December 1990, the Space Shuttle Columbia made stops at Barksdale on its way back to Cape Canaveral. In the immediate aftermath of the Columbia disaster in February 2003, a hangar at Barksdale Air Force Base, being the closest base to the accident site, was used to collect and catalogue the orbiter's debris before it was shipped to Kennedy Space Center, Florida.

On 20 September 2009, the airport was again used as a refuelling stop for the Space Shuttle's piggybacked return flight to Kennedy Space Center, as has done numerous times before. This time it was Discovery that was being flown from Naval Air Station Joint Reserve Base Fort Worth. The Shuttle Carrier Aircraft and Discovery remained at Barksdale overnight.

=== Operation Just Cause/Desert Shield/Desert Storm ===
Barksdale played significant roles in the December 1989 United States invasion of Panama, Operation Desert Shield in August 1990 and Operation Desert Storm in January 1991. The first combat sortie of Desert Storm was launched from Barksdale, when seven B-52Gs flew a 35-hour mission — the longest combat sortie in history at that time — to fire a barrage of conventional air-launched cruise missiles against Iraq. The B-52s from Barksdale that were deployed to Morón Air Base, Spain — a former SAC "Reflex" base — dropped 10 percent of all U.S. Air Force bombs during the Persian Gulf War.

=== Post-Cold War ===
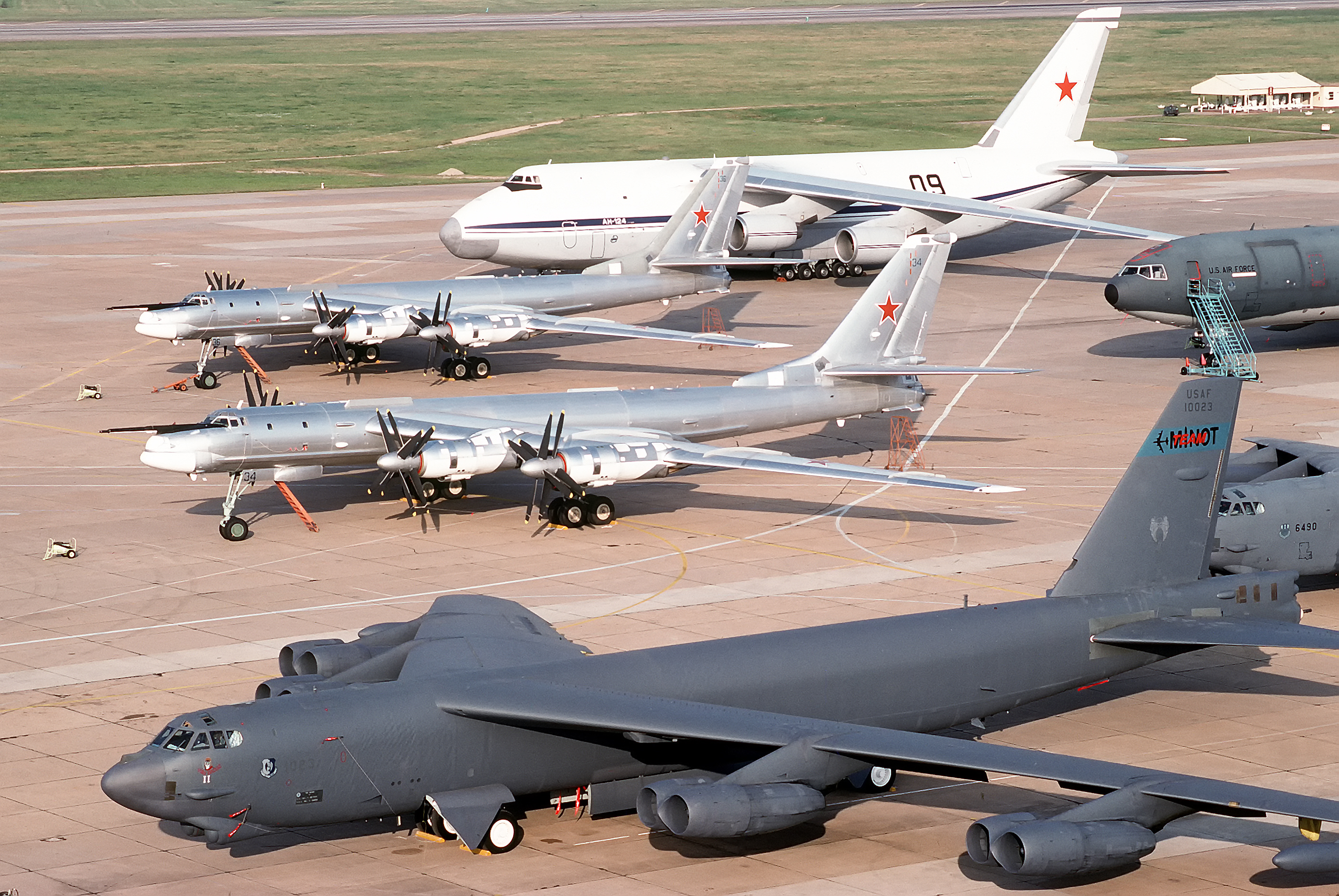
B-52s and Tu-95s together on the tarmac at Barksdale during the May 1992 Russian visit

Upon its return from the Middle East, the 2nd Bombardment Wing, Heavy was redesignated the 2nd Wing with its implementation of the objective wing organization on 1 September 1991.

The base turned its attention from combat to more peaceful pursuits when two B-52s, a KC-10 and their crews visited Dyagilevo air base, Russia, in March 1992. In May 1992, Barksdale hosted a return visit by two Russian Tupolev Tu-95 "Bear" bombers, an Antonov An-124 "Condor" transport and 58 Russian airmen. The Russians stayed for six days, seeing a slice of America and participating in Strategic Air Command's final Bombing and Navigation Competition awards symposium. The Russians visited again in August 1994, bringing a Tu-95 "Bear" and an Ilyushin Il-78 aerial tanker. Barksdale began a friendship with Ukrainian Air Force airmen later in 1994, when a B-52 and KC-10 visited Poltava Air Base, Ukraine.

In April 1992, 265 buildings on Barksdale's main base were placed on the National Register of Historic Places. The area from the Shreveport Gate to the flightline and from the Bossier Gate to Hoban Hall make up the Barksdale Field Historic District, along with much of family housing. On 1 June 1992, Barksdale was transferred from the inactivating Strategic Air Command to the newly activated Air Combat Command (ACC). All active-duty aircraft assigned to Barksdale were assigned ACC tail codes of "LA".

An equipment change began also in 1992 when the 596th Bomb Squadron retired its B-52Gs and replaced them with B-52Hs from inactivating squadrons at other former SAC bases. The 596th itself was inactivated when it was replaced by the 96th Bomb Squadron on 1 October 1993. The 20th Bomb Squadron was reassigned to the 2nd Wing on 17 December 1992 when it and its B-52Hs were reassigned to Barksdale from the 7th Wing, the latter which was relocating from the closing Carswell Air Force Base, Texas, and transferring to Dyess Air Force Base, Texas in order to transition to the Rockwell B-1 Lancer.

In October 1993, the 2nd Wing was redesignated as the 2nd Bomb Wing when the 71st Air Refueling Squadron and its KC-135A/Qs were reassigned to the Air Mobility Command.

A third B-52H squadron was assigned to the wing on 1 July 1994 when the 11th Bomb Squadron was activated at Barksdale. The mission of the 11th BS is that of a Formal Training Unit (FTU) for the B-52H.

=== 1990s combat operations ===
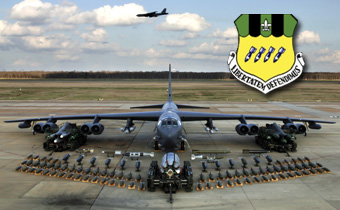
B-52H bomber at Barksdale AFB, Louisiana

Barksdale became the focus of attention once again in September 1996 as two of its B-52s fired 13 AGM-86C CALCM missiles on surface-to-air missile sites and air defense radars in Iraq. Dubbed Operation Desert Strike, the mission came in response to Iraqi ruler Saddam Hussein's attacks on Kurds in northern Iraq and was the first combat employment of the B-52H in history. In only a span of 80 hours, Barksdale B-52s and support personnel deployed forward to Andersen Air Force Base, Guam, carried out the strike against Iraqi targets and returned to Guam.

Fourteen months later, in November 1997, personnel and aircraft deployed from Barksdale to the British island of Diego Garcia in the Indian Ocean by order of U.S. president Bill Clinton. They joined forces already in the region in response to a renewed bout of provocations and threats made by Saddam Hussein. Remaining at Diego Garcia until June 1998, Barksdale's forces bolstered the ability to defend the security of the region against possible aggression by Iraq and to accomplish specific military objectives if a diplomatic solution to the confrontation could not be achieved.

Six B-52s and personnel from Barksdale were again deployed to Diego Garcia in November 1998 becoming part of the 2nd Air Expeditionary Group. Seven bombers and about 180 people deployed in response to Iraq's refusal to cooperate with United Nations weapons inspectors. Although president Clinton called off strikes after Hussein's last-minute concessions to meet U.N. demands, Iraq's cooperation continued to deteriorate. U.S. military forces, including Barksdale's B-52s, launched a sustained series of air strikes against Iraq shortly after midnight 17 December 1998. The three-day-long campaign, dubbed Operation Desert Fox, followed the latest in a series of roadblocks by the Iraqi government against weapons inspections conducted by the U.N. Special Commission.

From March to June 1999, ten B-52s and personnel of the 2nd Bomb Wing played a prominent role in halting the brutal Serb expulsion of ethnic Albanians from Kosovo. Operating from RAF Fairford as part of the 2nd Air Expeditionary Group in the United Kingdom, Barksdale B-52s flew over 180 combat sorties and released over 6,600 weapons against military targets throughout the Federal Republic of Yugoslavia during Operation Allied Force.

=== "War on Terror" ===
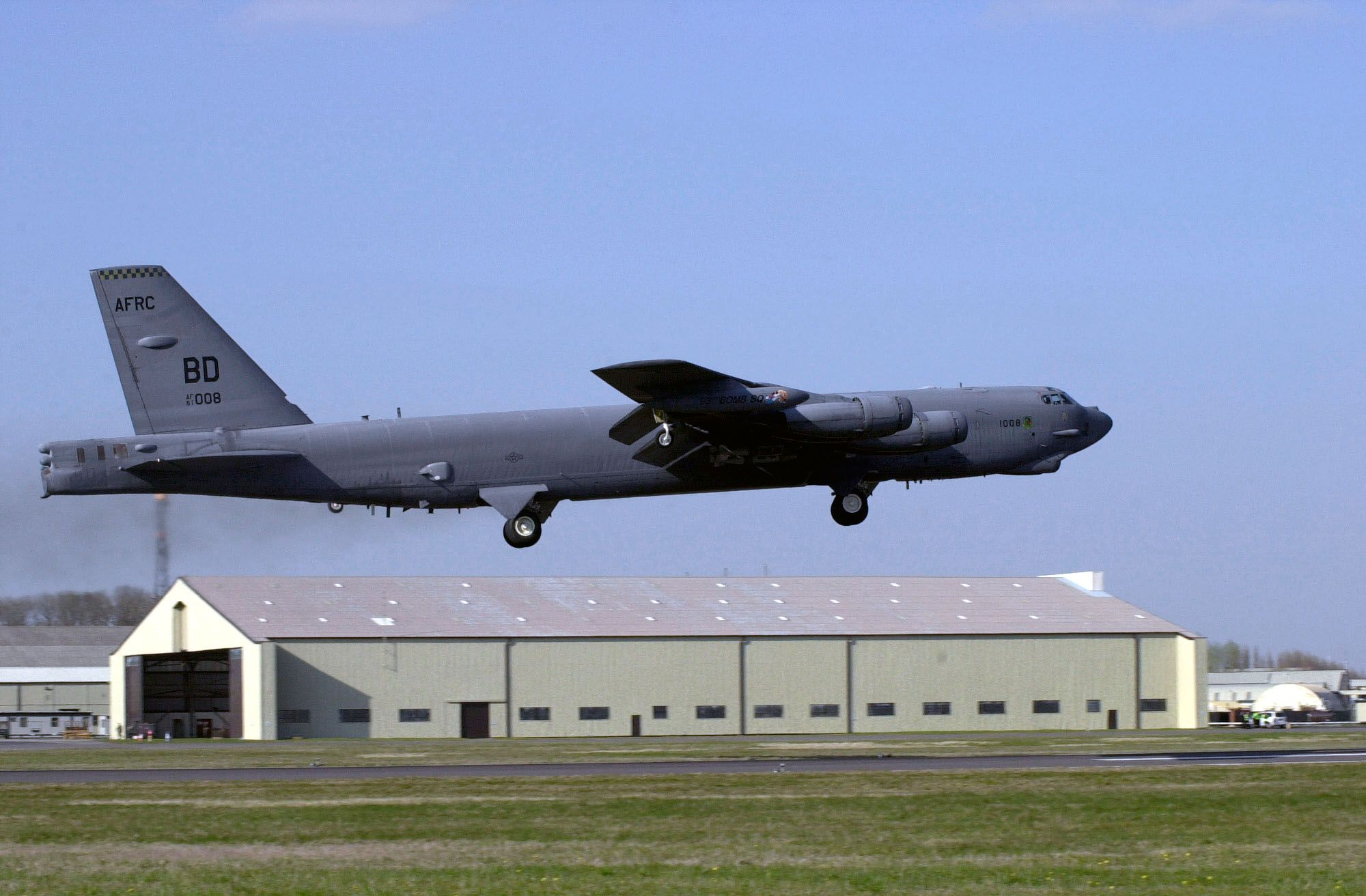
Boeing B-52H-165-BW Stratofortress AF Serial No. 61-0008 of the 93rd Bomb Squadron (AFRC) takes off on a unique mission with new equipment, 7 April 2003. The mission they are preparing for will be the first "real world" mission where a Lightning 2 Pod is used for laser-guided bomb delivery. The base at which the aircrew is deployed is currently the home of the 457th Air Expeditionary Group, which has been positioned to support the 2003 invasion of Iraq.

Immediately following the terrorist attacks on 11 September 2001, Barksdale provided a safe haven for President George W. Bush on his return flight to the nation's capital. Shortly thereafter, the National Command Authority called upon the base to provide substantial forces to spearhead the global war on terrorism. Operating from multiple overseas locations, Barksdale airmen and B-52s, both active and reserve alike, played a key role in the first airstrikes of Operation Enduring Freedom. Returning yet again to the skies of Iraq, Barksdale B-52s flew over 150 combat sorties against military targets throughout the southern half of the country during the 2003 invasion of Iraq.

On 30 August 2007, a B-52 originating from Minot Air Force Base carried six AGM-86 cruise missiles, each loaded with a W80 nuclear warhead, to Barksdale without the knowledge of base personnel or crew. The incident sparked controversy across the country. As an result of the situation, United States Secretary of Defense Robert Gates announced that, "A substantial number of Air Force general officers and colonels have been identified as potentially subject to disciplinary measures, ranging from removal from command to letters of reprimand", and that he had accepted the resignations of Secretary of the Air Force Michael Wynne and Chief of Staff of the Air Force Michael Moseley. This led to the establishment of the Global Strike Command, activated in August 2009 with headquarters at Barksdale.

The 2nd Bomb Wing was assigned to the Air Force Global Strike Command on 1 February 2010.

On 1 January 2011, Air Force Reserve Command inactivated the 917th Wing, while at the same time activating the 307th Bomb Wing, which subsumed the B-52 units of the 917th Wing. The A-10 units of the 917th Wing remain at Barksdale Air Force Base, under the newly created 917th Fighter Group, while organizational control is with the 442nd Fighter Wing, Whiteman Air Force Base, Missouri.

A 2013 North Korean propaganda photo shows that Barksdale is one of four targets in the United States for a potential North Korean nuclear attack, alongside the Pentagon in Arlington, Virginia, Pearl Harbor in Hawaii, the headquarters of the United States Indo-Pacific Command and the site of the attack on Pearl Harbor, and San Diego, the homeport of the Navy's United States Pacific Fleet. The photo depicts North Korean leader Kim Jong Un meeting with several of his generals in a "situation room" with walls covered in maps, one of which depicts lines thought to represent missiles going from Korea to the United States. The line targeting Barksdale was obscured by the hat of Lt. Gen. Kim Rak-gyom, but is believed by nuclear proliferation and North Korea expert Jeffrey Lewis to lead to Barksdale. Barksdale is thought to be targeted because it hosts the headquarters of the Air Force Global Strike Command and its fleet of nuclear-armed bombers. In a 2018 book, Lewis argues that North Korea also targeted Barksdale because President George W. Bush took shelter there after the 9/11 attacks, to send a message to the president that "you can run, but you can't hide." Though declining to comment on specifics, a spokesperson for Barksdale said that enemies of the United States are "grossly overmatched in their capabilities" and that the Air Force is "ready to project that power and [to] make sure they understand that message loud and clear."

==== 917th Wing (Air Force Reserve Command) ====
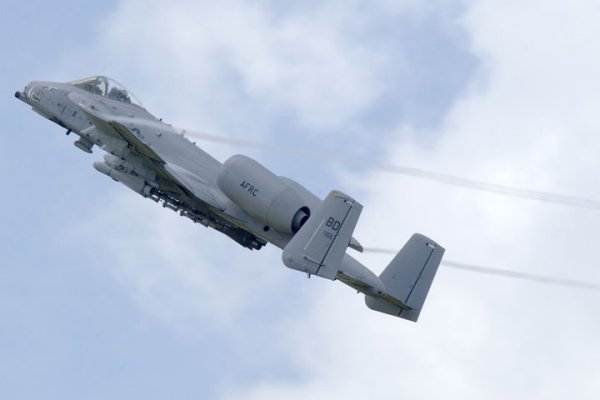
Fairchild Republic A-10A Thunderbolt II AF Serial No. 80-0155 of the 47th Fighter Squadron (AFRC), based at Barksdale. This aircraft was retired to AMARG on 4 December 2001, then returned to service.

The 917th Wing was originally formed as the 917th Troop Carrier Group on 17 January 1963 at Barksdale and was assigned to the 435th Troop Carrier Wing. Its mission was to administer and support its assigned 78th Troop Carrier Squadron which was equipped with Douglas C-124 Globemaster IIs.

On 1 July 1963, both the group and squadron were reassigned to the 442nd Troop Carrier Wing because their new gaining command, the Military Air Transport Service (MATS), wanted all five Air Force Reserve C-124 Groups assigned to the same wing. The units were reassigned to the 512th Troop Carrier Wing on 25 March 1965.

Reflecting similar changes in the active force, the 917th was redesignated twice, initially to the 917th Air Transport Group in 1965, and then to the 917th Military Airlift Group in 1966. The 917th Military Airlift Group was awarded the Air Force Outstanding Unit Award for its exceptional safety record of more than 55,000 accident-free flying hours and global support missions.

On 26 April 1972, the unit was redesignated the 917th Special Operations Group, with Tactical Air Command as the gaining major air command. As the missions changed, the unit was redesignated the 917th Tactical Fighter Group (917 TFG) on 1 October 1973. The 78th Troop Carrier Squadron was subsequently inactivated and replaced by the 47th Tactical Fighter Squadron. During the late 1980s, the 917 TFG group was upgraded to wing status and renamed the 917th Tactical Fighter Wing (917 TFW).

Due to Air Force restructuring in June 1992, Tactical Air Command was combined with all elements of the Strategic Air Command (except KC-135 and KC-10 aircraft) to form the new Air Combat Command (ACC). The 917th Tactical Fighter Wing joined Air Combat Command and "Tactical" was dropped from its name.

On 1 October 1993, the 917th Fighter Wing (917 FW) saw important changes once again. The 46th Fighter Training Squadron was inactivated when the active-duty Air Force took control of all fighter replacement training. On this same day, the 917th became the first unit in Air Force Reserve history to acquire a strategic mission: B-52Hs were added to the wing make-up and the 93rd Bomb Squadron was activated. Now a composite wing, the 917th dropped "Fighter" from its name and became the 917th Wing (917 WG).

In its 2005 BRAC Recommendations, DoD recommended to realign Eielson Air Force Base, Alaska. Some of the 354th Fighter Wing's assigned A-10 aircraft (located at Eielson AFB) would be distributed to the 917th Wing Barksdale Air Force Base (three aircraft). This recommendation was made because, although a base with high military value, Eielson was an expensive base to maintain.

In another Recommendation, DoD recommended to realign Air Force Reserve fighter assets at Naval Air Station Joint Reserve Base New Orleans, LA. It would distribute six of the 926th Fighter Wing's A-10 aircraft to the 917th Wing.

On 20 September 2009, the airport was used as a refuelling stop for the Space Shuttle Discovery's return flight to the Kennedy Space Center that was being piggybacked from Naval Air Station Joint Reserve Base Fort Worth. The Shuttle Carrier Aircraft and Space Shuttle Discovery remained at Barksdale over night.

=== Bossier Base ===
Bossier Base, now called The East Reservation due to its location east of the runway, was formerly a Defense Atomic Support Agency (DASA) Q clearance maintenance and weapon storage area during the Cold War. It was similar to Sandia Base's Manzano. Once entirely independent of the USAF and Barksdale AFB, it has been merged with the main base.

In January 2026, national security concerns were raised about adjacent golf courses on both sides of the base owned by an individual with membership in "united front" groups affiliated with the Chinese Communist Party.

== Based units ==
Flying and notable non-flying units based at Barksdale Air Force Base.

Units marked GSU are Geographically Separate Units, which although based at Barksdale, are subordinate to a parent unit based at another location.

=== United States Air Force ===
Air Force Global Strike Command (AFGSC)

- Headquarters Air Force Global Strike Command
- Eighth Air Force
  - Headquarters Eighth Air Force
  - 2nd Bomb Wing (Host wing)
    - Headquarters 2nd Bomb Wing
    - 2nd Comptroller Squadron
    - 2nd Operations Group
      - 11th Bomb Squadron – B-52H Stratofortress
      - 20th Bomb Squadron – B-52H Stratofortress
      - 96th Bomb Squadron – B-52H Stratofortress
      - 2nd Operations Support Squadron
    - 2nd Maintenance Group
      - 2nd Aircraft Maintenance Squadron (inactivated August 22, 2024)
      - 20th Bomber Generation Squadron (activated August 22, 2024)
      - 96th Bomber Generation Squadron (activated August 22, 2024)
      - 2nd Maintenance Squadron
      - 2nd Munitions Squadron
    - 2nd Medical Group
      - 2nd Aerospace Medicine Squadron
      - 2nd Dental Squadron
      - 2nd Medical Operations Squadron
      - 2nd Medical Support Squadron
    - 2nd Mission Support Group
      - 2nd Contracting Squadron
      - 2nd Communications Squadron
      - 2nd Force Support Squadron
      - 2nd Logistics Readiness Squadron
      - 2nd Security Forces Squadron

Air Force Reserve Command (AFRC)

- Tenth Air Force
  - 307th Bomb Wing
    - Headquarters 307th Bomb Wing
    - 307th Operations Group
      - 93rd Bomb Squadron – B-52H Stratofortress
      - 343rd Bomb Squadron – B-52H Stratofortress
      - 307th Operations Support Squadron
    - 307th Maintenance Group
      - 307th Aircraft Maintenance Squadron
      - 307th Maintenance Squadron
      - 707th Maintenance Squadron
      - 307th Maintenance Operations Flight
    - 307th Mission Support Group
      - 307th Civil Engineer Squadron
      - 307th Force Support Squadron
      - 307th Logistics Readiness Squadron
      - 307th Security Forces Squadron

Air Combat Command (ACC)

- US Air Force Warfare Center
  - 53rd Wing
    - 53rd Test and Evaluation Group
      - 49th Test and Evaluation Squadron (GSU) – B-52H Stratofortress
  - 57th Wing
    - US Air Force Weapons School
      - 340th Weapons Squadron (GSU) – B-52H Stratofortress
- Sixteenth Air Force
  - 67th Cyberspace Wing
    - 8th Information Warfare Flight (GSU)
  - 557th Weather Wing
    - 1st Weather Group
      - 26th Operational Weather Squadron (GSU)

== Major commands to which assigned ==
- Fourth Corps Area (United States Army), 1 August 1932 – 1 March 1935
- GHQ Air Force, 1 March 1935 – 15 October 1940
- Southeastern Air Corps Training Center, 15 October 1940 – 6 December 1941
- AF Combat Command, 6 December 1941 – 10 February 1942
- 3d Air Force, 10 February 1942 – 6 June 1945
- Continental Air Forces, 6 June 1945 – 1 November 1945
- AAF Training Command, 1 November 1945 – 1 July 1946
- Air Training Command, 1 July 1946 – 1 November 1949
- Strategic Air Command, 1 November 1949 – 1 June 1992
- Air Combat Command, 1 June 1992 – 1 February 2010
- Air Force Global Strike Command, 1 February 2010–present

=== Major units assigned ===
- 20th Pursuit Group, 31 October 1932 – 19 November 1939
- 3d Attack Group, 19 February 1935 – 1 March 1935
- Station Complement, Barksdale Fld, 1 March 1935 – 26 August 1936
- Base HQ and 6th Air Base Sq GHQ, 26 August 1936 – 13 June 1943
- 335th Bombardment Group (Medium) 17 July 1942 – 1 May 1944
- 331st AAF Base Unit, 1 May 1944 – 1 December 1945
- 2621st AAF Base Unit, 1 December 1945 – 26 September 1947
- 2621st AF Base Unit, 26 September 1947 – 26 August 1948
- 3500th Pilot Training Wg, 26 August 1948 – 14 October 1949
- 47th Bombardment Wing, 19 November 1948 – 2 October 1949
- 91st Strategic Reconnaissance Wing, 14 October 1949 – 16 June 1952
- Second Air Force, 1 November 1949 – 1 January 1975
- 301st Bombardment Wing, 7 November 1949 – 15 April 1958
- 376th Bombardment Wing, 10 October 1951 – 30 November 1957
- 301st Air Refueling Wing, 18 March 1953 – 15 April 1958
- 4238th Strategic Wing, 1 March 1958 – 1 April 1963
- 1st Combat Evaluation Group, 1 August 1961 – 1990
- 917th Wing, 28 December 1962 – 8 January 2011
- 307th Bomb Wing, 8 January 2011 – present
- 2nd Bombardment Wing, 1 April 1963 – present
- Eighth Air Force, 1 January 1975 – present
- Air Force Cyber Command (Provisional), 1 October 2007 – 6 October 2008

== Education ==
The base is in the Bossier Parish School District.

The housing on the main base is assigned to Waller Elementary School, Rusheon Middle School, and Bossier High School. The East Reservation area is assigned to T. L. Rodes Elementary School (PreKindergarten-Grade 1), Platt Elementary School (grades 2-3), Princeton Elementary School (grades 4-5), Haughton Middle School, and Haughton High School.

== See also ==
- List of United States Air Force installations
- Louisiana World War II Army Airfields
- National Register of Historic Places listings in Bossier Parish, Louisiana

== Other sources ==
- This article incorporates public domain material from the Air Force Historical Research Agency
- This article incorporates public domain material from Barksdale Air Force Base. United States Air Force.
- Maurer, Maurer. Air Force Combat Units of World War II. Washington, DC: U.S. Government Printing Office 1961 (republished 1983, Office of Air Force History, ISBN 0-912799-02-1).
- Ravenstein, Charles A. Air Force Combat Wings Lineage and Honors Histories 1947–1977. Maxwell Air Force Base, Alabama: Office of Air Force History 1984. ISBN 0-912799-12-9.
- Mueller, Robert, Air Force Bases Volume I, Active Air Force Bases Within the United States of America on 17 September 1982, Office of Air Force History, 1989
- Lloyd, Alwyn T. (2000), A Cold War Legacy, A Tribute to Strategic Air Command, 1946–1992, Pictorial Histories Publications ISBN 1-57510-052-5
- Rogers, Brian (2005). United States Air Force Unit Designations Since 1978. Hinkley, England: Midland Publications. ISBN 1-85780-197-0.
- Turner Publishing Company (1997), Strategic Air Command: The Story of the Strategic Air Command and Its People. Turner Publishing Company ISBN 1-56311-265-5
- USAAS-USAAC-USAAF-USAF Aircraft Serial Numbers—1908 to present
- ArmyAirForces.com
- Strategic-Air-Command.com Archived 27 February 2011 at the Wayback Machine
