= Gerald Presley =

Canadian bobsledder

Medal record

Bobsleigh

World Championships
Gold medal – first place	1965 St. Moritz	Four-man

Gerald Presley (31 May 1942 in Arnprior, Ontario – 6 May 2024 in White Rock, British Columbia) was a Canadian bobsledder who competed in the mid-1960s. He won a gold medal in the four-man event at the 1965 FIBT World Championships in St. Moritz.

Presley was inducted into Canada's Sports Fall of Fame in 1965 and into the Canadian Forces Sports Hall of Fame in 2001.
