= FIBT World Championships 1965 =

Winter sport competition

1965 World Championships
- Location: St. Moritz, Switzerland

The FIBT World Championships 1965 took place in St. Moritz, Switzerland for the record tenth time. The Swiss city had hosted the event previously in 1931 (Four-man), 1935 (Four-man), 1937 (Four-man), 1938 (Two-man), 1939 (Two-man), 1947, 1955, 1957, and 1959.

== Two man bobsleigh ==
Pos	Team	Time
Gold	United Kingdom (Anthony Nash, Robin Dixon)	
Silver	Italy (Rinaldo Ruatti, Enrico de Lorenzo)	
Bronze	Canada (Vic Emery, Michael Young)	

== Four man bobsleigh ==
Pos	Team	Time
Gold	Canada (Vic Emery, Gerald Presley, Michael Young, Peter Kirby)	
Silver	Italy (Nevio de Zordo, Italo de Lorenzo, Pietro Lesana, Robert Mocellini)	
Bronze	United States (Fred Fortune, Richard Knuckles, Joe Wilson, James Lord)	

Canada earned its first gold medal at these championships.

== Medal table ==
Rank	Nation	Gold	Silver	Bronze	Total
1	Italy (ITA)	1	2	0	3
2	Canada (CAN)	1	0	1	2
3	Great Britain (GBR)	1	0	0	1
4	United States (USA)	0	0	1	1
Totals (4 entries)		3	2	2	7
