= Richard Knuckles =

American bobsledder

Medal record

Bobsleigh

World Championships
Bronze medal – third place	1965 St. Moritz	Four-man

Richard Knuckles is an American bobsledder who competed in the mid-1960s. He won a bronze medal in the four-man event at the 1965 FIBT World Championships in St. Moritz. Knuckles is from Virginia Beach, Virginia.
