= William Lord =

William Lord may refer to:

- William Lord (Medal of Honor) (1841–1915), American army musician and Medal of Honor recipient
- William Barry Lord (19th century), British army veterinary surgeon and writer
- William H. Lord (1864–1933), American architect
- William Paine Lord (1838–1911), American politician from Oregon
- William T. Lord (born c. 1955), American air force officer
- William A. Lord (1849–1927), Vermont lawyer and politician
- William Lord (cricketer) (1873–1906), English cricketer
