= Joseph Peter Wilson =

American bobsledder and cross-country skier (1935–2019)

Personal information
- Born: May 22, 1935 Lake Placid, New York, U.S.
- Died: September 13, 2019 (aged 84)

Sport
- Sport: Skiing
Medal record
Bobsleigh
World Championships
Bronze medal – third place	1965 St. Moritz	Four-man

Joseph Peter "Joe Pete" Wilson (May 22, 1935 – September 13, 2019) was an American Olympic cross-country skier, who skied for the U.S. in cross-country at the 1960 Winter Olympics and later became a skiing administrator in the United States. Wilson also in collaboration authored several books on cross-country skiing, all co-written by William J. Lederer. Wilson set up the cross-country ski area at the Trapp Family Lodge in Stowe, Vermont. In 1973, Wilson organized a meeting of 25 ski areas and established the National Ski Touring Operators' Association. Wilson was named as its first President from 1973-1977. After several name changes it is now called the Cross Country Ski Areas Association (CCSAA). CCSAA is an international association of U.S. and Canadian cross-country ski areas. Wilson is also known for having set up an inn in Keene, New York, the Bark Eater Inn, and developing the ski trails around the inn.

== Early life and education ==
Born in Lake Placid, New York, to Gordon H. Wilson and Anna L. Wilson, Joe Pete spent his summers on his family farm in Keene, New York. In 1953 he graduated from Lake Placid High School where he was a Ski Meister Skier for four years. In 1954 he attended Vermont Academy under Warren Chivers. In 1958 he graduated from St. Lawrence University where he competed in cross country, Nordic combined, and Ski Meister under Otto Scheibs. He was used for team Alpine scoring only when necessary. He was elected Captain of the team for two years.

== U.S. Army ==
From 1959 to 1963, Wilson was a lieutenant in the United States Army. He was assigned to the U.S. Biathlon Team Training at Fort Richardson, in Anchorage, Alaska. He spent his entire four-year service career competing in cross-country and in Biathlon for the U.S. in Europe and with the U.S. Army Marksmanship Team.

Upon arrival at Fort Richardson, Wilson discovered there were no training facilities available for Biathlon. Wilson and his two teammates built a complex biathlon shooting range which was used for the next 12 years, until the U.S. Army stopped financing the U.S. Biathlon effort.

== Athletic career ==
=== Olympics ===
In 1959 Wilson placed first in the Olympic pre-trials in the 15k, which was held on the grounds that would soon become McKinney Creek Stadium, where the cross-country skiing and Nordic combined Winter Olympic events took place in 1960. This placing set Joe Pete up as a major U.S. skier due to the number of U.S. and foreign competitors in the race. International Olympic Committee Rules require that a major International Competition be held in all events prior to an Olympic Competition, usually scheduled one year prior as a trial run to test the complex systems involved.

Wilson was a member of the U.S. Nordic Ski Team Competing in Squaw Valley, California, in 1960. He skied the 30K. He finished 43rd.

=== Racing in Europe ===
In 1961 and 1962, Wilson was on the U.S. Team racing in Europe, including Scandinavia, in cross-country and in biathlon. In 1962 he finished tenth in Falun, Sweden: in their National Championships among 900 competitors, a significant placing for an American at that time.

=== 1964: North American Snowshoe Champion ===
Having just recently left the U.S. Ski Team, Wilson entered the North American Snowshoe Championships sponsored by the Saranac Lake Chamber of Commerce as part of the Winter Carnival, first introduced in 1897.

=== 1965: Bobsled World Championships bronze medal ===
In 1965, Wilson earned a bronze medal in the Bobsled World Championship in St. Moritz, Switzerland.

== Ski development career ==
=== 1963: Discovering Mount Van Hoevenberg ===
In 1963, after leaving the U.S. Team, Wilson returned to Lake Placid and the family business. He volunteered coaching high school kids throughout the Adirondacks.

He was contacted by the head of the New York State Forest Rangers, Mr. William Petty, to research the Mount Van Hoevenberg area, with the idea in mind of creating cross country trails in a park type atmosphere. Since the bobsled run was already there, they had substantial land holdings there.

Wilson spent two months tramping, judging, and recording his notes. His only concern at the time was if there would be adequate elevation change to comply with international rules. Subsequent land purchases solved that problem. As a result of the efforts required to hold the 1980 Olympics it became next to Holmenkollen, the premier cross country ski center in the world.

=== Burke Mountain Academy ===
During the 1966 to 1969 period "Burke" was a small ski area in East Burke, Vermont. Under Wilson's management the facility was expanded, including the trails and base Lodge, where a bar and dining room were added. Several farmhouses were completely remodeled. Several condos, townhouses, and a vacation home were built. A complete sewage system was designed and built. Wilson staffed it with many young, enthusiastic people with skiing backgrounds, typical of the day. As a result of his real estate background, Wilson realized the future sales value of the land surrounding this Monadnock type mountain and the views it offered. Wilson also knew that along with ownership came the right to control the design and atmosphere of whatever was done in the future. Wilson put together a 4,000-acre land package on the north facing side, which also controlled lands on the east and west sides of the mountain.

In the continual effort to increase business at Burke, Wilson realized he had a lot of mountain and a lot of lift capacity, especially mid-week. He was aware of the experiments with ski sports academies at Stratton and Stowe. He decided it was worth a try. He made the proposal to his board and the Burke Mountain Academy was born.

=== Trapp Family Lodge ===
Wilson set up the cross-country ski operation at the Trapp Family Lodge in Stowe, Vermont. The Trapp Family Lodge Ski Center operates much the same today as when Joe Pete originally set it up.

== Ventures, companies, and positions ==
In 1967-1968, Wilson was elected treasurer of the Vermont Ski Areas Association. In 1971, he became director of advertising and public relations and manager of real estate sales at the Glen Ellen ski area in Vermont.

In 1972, there was little knowledge or information available to the general public in the United States about cross-country skiing. Wilson helped establish the Cross-Country Ski Area Association (CCSAA), now an international organization including Canada and is headquartered in Winchester, New Hampshire.

In 1973, Wilson established a company called North American Nordic (N.A.N). He picked fifteen of the best locations in the Northeastern United States. The concept of a franchise type operation and the grooming of trails was a radical step for cross-country skiing at the time. It ceased operations upon the death of his friend John Greene.

In 1974, Wilson brought together a small group of people working in the sport who were involved with major cross-country ski areas. A solid teaching system evolved, which was universally accepted and known today as P.S.I.A.

In 1981, Wilson took control of the family inn business known as the Bark Eater in Keene, New York. Wilson built a polo field, an ingenious trick on an Adirondack hillside farm. The riding stable grew to a total of eighty-five horses. He designed a cross country trail system here.

== Coaching and competition management ==
From 1977-1978, Wilson was named coach of the U.S. Biathlon team. During this time frame, the US Biathlon Team had significant success at the World Championships held in Lake Placid prior to the 1980 Olympics.

From 1979-1980, Wilson was the venue manager for the bobsled and Luge events at the 1980 Lake Placid Olympics. He directed a staff of 4,000 employees and volunteers.

In 1983, he was chosen as the Chief of Race for the World Masters skiing competition at Mount Van Hoevenberg in Lake Placid. This event attracted 1000 competitors.

== Awards & recognitions ==
In 2001, Wilson was inducted into the Lake Placid Hall of Fame.

In 2011, Wilson was inducted into the St. Lawrence University Hall of Fame.

In 2014, Wilson was honored with a Founders Award by Chris Frado, Executive Director and President of CCSAA for his work and dedication to the sport of cross-country skiing and the CCSAA.

== Snowshoe designs ==
Wilson has designed what he calls a "snowshoe that slides". It has a slight side cut. The tip is slightly wider than the midpoint and the tail is slightly more narrow than the tip, but still wider than the midpoint. It functions best when used with a three pin OB binding and a rugged boot, like the Fisher OB3. It has a no wax base and a slight reverse camber (rocker). He has designed a second ski, a skate/touring concept and is working on its development and production.

== Personal life ==
Joe Pete Wilson resided outside Lake Placid, NY; near the Saranac Lake area, home to 3 new Nordic Olympians, one winning Gold.

In 2013, Wilson launched a grassroots campaign to use the term "Nordic" more in conversation, writing, in print and signage. Wilson believes a universal symbol is needed to represent the four disciplines of Cross Country, Jumping, Combined, and Biathlon.

Wilson died on September 13, 2019.

== Results ==
Men's 30 Kilometres
Games	Age	City	Sport	Event	Team	NOC	Rank	Medal
1960 Winter	24	Squaw Valley	Cross Country Skiing	Men's 30 kilometres	United States	USA	43	

Cross Country Skiing
Games	Age	City	Sport	Country	Phase	Unit	Rank	T	I1T	I1R	I2T	I2R
1960 Winter	24	Squaw Valley	Cross Country Skiing	United States	Final Standings		43	2-22:16.2	44:26	43	1-31:33	43

== Selected works ==
- "Complete Cross-Country Skiing and Ski Touring", 1970 (co-author). This book is often credited with starting the boom in cross-country skiing in the United States in the 1970s.
- "Cross-Country Ski Inns of the Northeastern United States and Canada", 1986
- "Cross-Country Ski Inns of the Northeastern US and Quebec", 1991
