= Michael Young (bobsleigh) =

Canadian bobsledder (born 1944)

Personal information
- Born: August 15, 1944 (age 81) Port Credit, Ontario, Canada
Medal record
Bobsleigh
World Championships
Gold medal – first place	1965 St. Moritz	Four-man
Bronze medal – third place	1965 St. Moritz	Two-man

Michael Darcy Young (born August 15, 1944) is a Canadian former bobsledder who competed in the 1960s. He won two medals at the 1965 FIBT World Championships in St. Moritz with a gold in the four-man event and a bronze in the two-man event.

In 1966, he was severely injured during a four-man competition at the bobsleigh track in Lake Placid, New York, when his sled hit the superstructure of the track at Turns 13 and 14, known as the "Zig-Zag Curves", damaging his face. Young was rushed to the hospital in Lake Placid, then flown to a hospital in Montreal to undergo extensive plastic surgery. This crash killed his compatriot Sergio Zardini and also featured future FIBT president Robert H. Storey.

Young got involved with bobsleigh, after being introduced to the sport by his cousin Vic Emery while studying at the University of Western Ontario. Young and the rest of the four-man crew would be honored in Canada's Sports Hall of Fame. Young also finished 17th in the four-man event at the 1968 Winter Olympics in Grenoble.

Born in Port Credit, Ontario, Young emigrated to the United States in 1975, settling in Denver, Colorado. Young then moved to Dallas, Texas, where he is a business consultant.

Youn was inducted into the Canada's Sports Hall of Fame in 1965.
