= Robert Mocellini =

Italian bobsledder

Medal record

Bobsleigh

World Championships
Silver medal – second place	1965 St. Moritz	Four-man

Robert Mocellini is an Italian bobsledder who competed in the mid-1960s. He won a silver medal in the four-man event at the 1965 FIBT World Championships in St. Moritz.
