= Laud =

Laud may refer to:

- Extraordinary praise
- Laúd, a 12-string lute from Spain, played also in diaspora countries such as Cuba and the Philippines and featured in rondalla music
- Laud, Indiana, an unincorporated community in Whitley County

== People with the surname Laud ==
- William Laud (1573–1645), Archbishop of Canterbury
- Derek Laud (born 1964), British political lobbyist

== People with the given name Laud ==
- Laud of Coutances (6th century), bishop of Coutances
- Laud Humphreys (1930–1988), American sociologist and author

== See also ==
- Lauds, a divine office in the Roman Catholic Church
