= Andrew Lord =

Andrew Lord may refer to:

- Andrew Lord (ice hockey) (born 1985), Canadian ice hockey player
- Andrew Lord (artist) (born 1950), English artist based in New York
- Andy Lord (born 1970), British transport executive
