= David Lord =

David Lord may refer to:

- David Lord (RAF officer) (1913–1944), British air force officer and Victoria Cross recipient
- David Lord (producer) (born 1944), English composer
- David Lord (rower) (1929–1998), South African rower
- David Lord (politician) (1934–2005), American politician in Iowa
