= James Lord (bobsleigh) =

American bobsledder

Medal record

Bobsleigh

World Championships
Bronze medal – third place	1965 St. Moritz	Four-man

James Lord is an American bobsledder who competed in the mid-1960s. A NY State Forest Ranger at the time, Lord was brakeman on a sled piloted by Fred Fortune of Lake Placid who won a bronze medal in the four-man event at the 1965 FIBT World Championships in St. Moritz.
