= Air Force Cyber Command =

Proposed U.S. Air Force major command

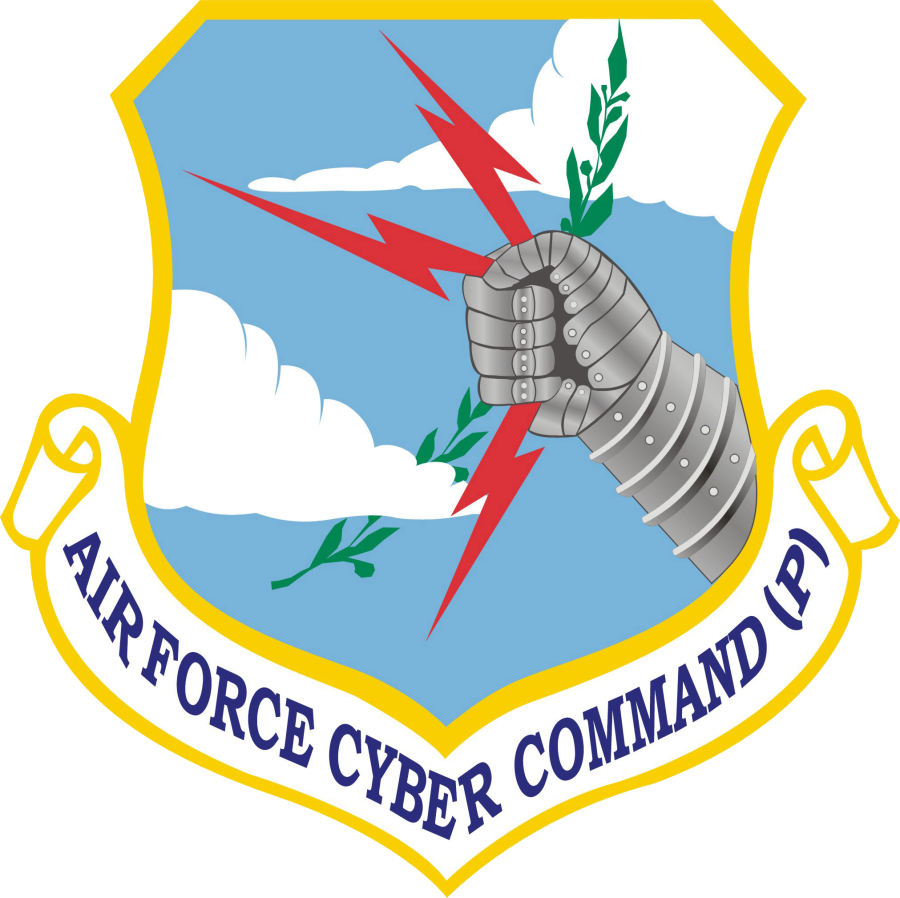
- Shield of Air Force Cyber Command
- Active: In provisional status 2007–2008; Never officially activated as Major Command
- Country: United States of America
- Branch: United States Air Force
- Type: Proposed Major Command
- Role: Administration
- Part of: HQ United States Air Force
- Garrison/HQ: Lackland AFB, Texas
- Nickname: AFCYBER

Air Force Cyber Command (AFCYBER) was a proposed United States Air Force Major Command that existed only in provisional status. On 6 October 2008, the Air Force announced that the command would not be brought into permanent activation, and that the cyber mission would be transferred, with the standup of the Twenty-Fourth Air Force, to Air Force Space Command.

== Overview ==
The development of AFCYBER was announced by the secretary of the Air Force on 2 November 2006. Originally designated to stand up around Summer 2007, but pushed back to late 2008, AFCYBER was planned to draw upon the personnel resources of the 67th Network Warfare Wing as well as other resources of the Eighth Air Force. It was planned to be placed under the command of Major General William T. Lord. Former secretary of the Air Force Michael Wynne summarized the mission of AFCYBER:

The aim was to develop a major command that stands alongside Air Force Space Command and Air Combat Command as the provider of forces that the President, combatant commanders and the American people can rely on for preserving the freedom of access and commerce, in air, space and now cyberspace.

On 14 August 2008, the Air Force made a statement about a pause in standing up the AFCYBER command, which was set for 1 October 2008.

The Air Force remains committed to providing full-spectrum cyber capabilities to include global command and control, electronic warfare and network defense. The Secretary and Chief of Staff of the Air Force have considered delaying currently planned actions on Air Force Cyber Command to allow ample time for a comprehensive assessment of all AFCYBER requirements and to synchronize the AFCYBER mission with other key Air Force initiatives. The new Air Force leaders continue to make a fresh assessment of all our efforts to provide our Nation and the joint force the full spectrum of air, space, and cyberspace capabilities.

On 8 October 2008, the Air Force followed up on its previous findings and decided to place AFCYBER as a Numbered Air Force within Air Force Space Command. On Wednesday, 19 August 2009, the 24th Air Force was stood up, following an environmental impact analysis as required by law.

Leadership also decided to establish a Numbered Air Force for cyber operations within Air Force Space Command and discussed how the Air Force will continue to develop capabilities in this new domain and train personnel to execute this new mission.

== Bases in contention for AFCYBER headquarters ==
This is the final list of Air Force bases that were in competition to host the Cyber Command headquarters, listed alphabetically by state:

- Peterson SFB, Colorado
- Scott AFB, Illinois
- Barksdale AFB, Louisiana
- Offutt AFB, Nebraska
- Lackland AFB, Texas
- Langley AFB, Virginia

On 14 May 2009, the Air Force announced that Lackland AFB in San Antonio, Texas, "has been selected as headquarters of the 24th Air Force, the Air Force's downgraded version of its provisional Cyber Command." However, it was also reported that "continued separate armed services cyber operations exist under a cloud of uncertainty...in light of recent reports that Secretary of Defense Robert Gates is considering creation of a multi-service Cyber Command to be based at Fort Meade, Md."

== Proposed organization ==
- Twenty-Fourth Air Force, co-located with AFCYBER HQ

=== Wings ===
- 67th Network Warfare Wing
- 688th Information Operations Wing
- 689th Combat Communications Wing

=== Groups ===
TBD

== See also ==
United States Cyber Command
