= Herbert Gardiner Lord =

American philosopher

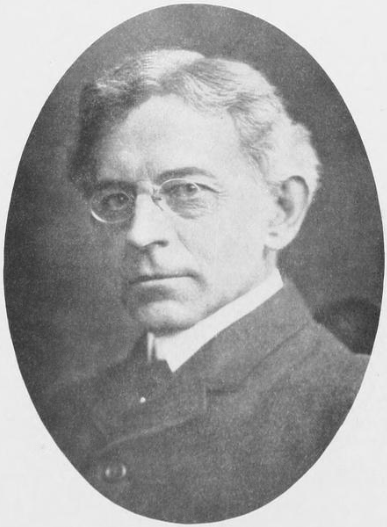
- Born: March 29, 1849; Boston, Massachusetts, US
- Died: March 12, 1930 (aged 80); New York, New York, US
- Education: Amherst College
- Occupation: Philosopher

Herbert Gardiner Lord (1849–1930) was an American philosopher.

== Biography ==
Lord was born in Boston on March 29, 1849. He was the son of the Rev. Daniel Miner Lord and was graduated from Amherst College in 1871 and at the Union Theological Seminary in 1877.

Lord was ordained to the Presbyterian ministry in 1878 and served as pastor of the church of the Redeemer, Buffalo, New York, 1877–1895. During 1895–1898 he was professor of philosophy at the School of Pedagogy, University of Buffalo; from 1890 to 1900 was principal of Franklin School, Buffalo; and in 1900 was appointed professor of philosophy at Columbia University.

In 1905 he chaired the committee on student organizations which recommended banning football at Columbia. After publicizing the committee's statement, he said ″The reasons for this action need no explanation. They must be present to every one acquainted with the game as it is now played. Only by such radical action can the university and college life be rid of a thing which it is believed has become as burdensome to the great mass of students as it has proved itself harmful to academic standing and dangerous to human life.″

That ban was part of a response to football fatalities that led Theodore Roosevelt to convene conferences that ultimately led to reform of the game and founding the National_Collegiate_Athletic_Association.

He died at his home in Manhattan on March 12, 1930.

== Works ==
He was one of the joint authors of Essays Philosophical and Psychological in Honor of William James; and is the author of The Psychology of Courage (1918).
