= William T. Lord =

United States Air Force general

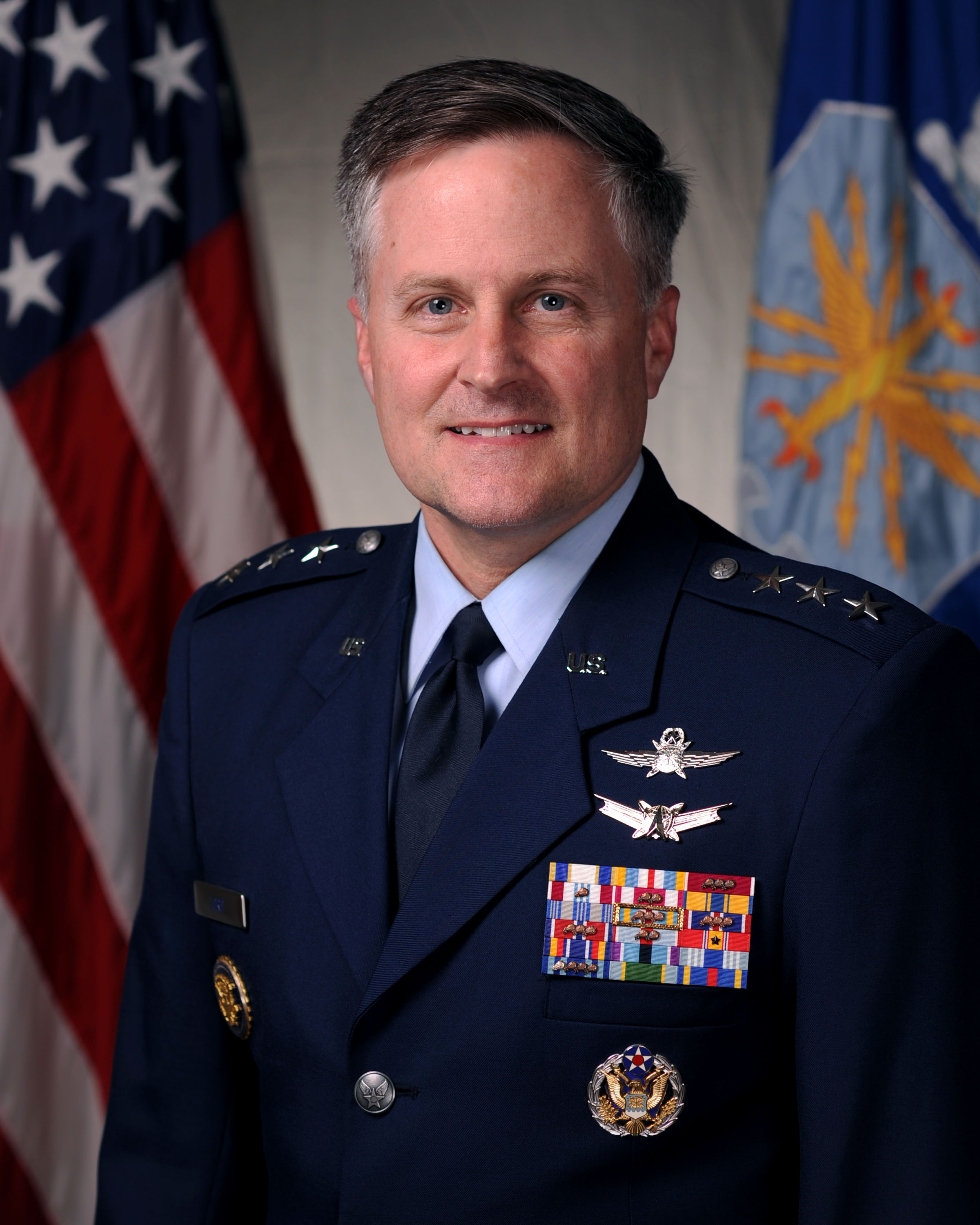
- U.S. Air Force Photo
- Born: September 5, 1955 (age 71); San Francisco, California, U.S.
- Military career
- Allegiance: United States of America
- Branch: United States Air Force
- Service years: 1977–2012
- Rank: Lieutenant General
- Nickname: "Bill"
- Commands: Chief of Warfighting Integration and Chief Information Officer, US Air Force
- Awards: Air Force Distinguished Service Medal; Defense Superior Service Medal; Legion of Merit (4)

William T. Lord (born September 5, 1955) was the Chief of Warfighting Integration and Chief Information Officer, Office of the Secretary of the Air Force, the Pentagon, Washington, D.C. Prior to his retirement, General Lord led five directorates and two field operating agencies consisting of more than 1,000 military, civilian and contractor personnel supporting a portfolio valued at $17 billion. He integrated Air Force warfighting and mission support capabilities by networking space, air and terrestrial assets. Additionally, he shaped doctrine, strategy, and policy for all communications and information activities while driving standards and governance, innovation, and architectures for information systems and personnel.

== Biography ==
Lt. Gen. William T. Lord is a 1977 graduate of the United States Air Force Academy. He holds a bachelor's degree in biological and life sciences, and master's degrees in business administration and national resource strategy. Lt. Gen. William T. Lord held various duties with tours in Europe, U.S. Central Command and the White House. He has had multiple staff assignments, including two major air commands as Director of Communications and Information Systems. Lt. Gen. William T. Lord has commanded at the detachment, squadron, group, wing and joint levels.

=== Education ===
- 1977 Bachelor of Science degree in biological and life sciences, U.S. Air Force Academy, Colorado Springs, Colo.
- 1983 Squadron Officer School, Maxwell AFB, Ala.
- 1984 Air Command and Staff College, Maxwell AFB, Ala.
- 1985 Master's degree in business administration, Chapman University, Orange, Calif.
- 1985 Marine Corps Command and Staff College, Quantico, Va.
- 1989 Armed Forces Staff College, Norfolk, Va.
- 1992 Air War College, Maxwell AFB, Ala.
- 1994 Master of Science degree in national resource strategy, Industrial College of the Armed Forces, Fort Lesley J. McNair, Washington, D.C.
- 2004 National Fellow, Maxwell School of Citizenship and Public Affairs, Syracuse University, N.Y.
- 2007 National Security Studies Program, Elliott School of International Affairs, George Washington University, Washington, D.C.

=== Assignments ===
1. July 1990 - March 1993, student, Communications-Electronics Officer Course, Keesler AFB, Miss.
2. March 1978 - January 1981, Chief, Commercial Communications Branch, 21st North American Air Defense Region, Hancock Field, N.Y.
3. January 1981 - September 1983, Commander, 2161st Communications Squadron, Royal Air Force Greenham Common, England
4. September 1983 - September 1985, Program Manager, Ground-Launched Cruise Missile, 485th Engineering Installation Group, Griffiss AFB, N.Y.
5. September 1995 - June 1997, Chief, Communications Architecture Division, System Integration Office, Air Force Space Command, Peterson AFB, Colo.
6. April 2000 - April 2002, Director of Communications and Information, Headquarters Air Mobility Command, Scott AFB, Ill.
7. April 2002 - April 2004, Director of Communications and Information, Headquarters ACC, Langley AFB, Va.
8. April 2004 - November 2005, Commander, 81st Training Wing, Keesler AFB, Miss.
9. November 2005 - April 2007, Director, Information, Services and Integration, Secretary of the Air Force Office of Warfighting Integration and Chief Information Officer, the Pentagon, Washington, D.C.
10. April 2007 - October 2007, Director, Cyberspace Transformation and Strategy, Secretary of the Air Force Office of Warfighting Integration and Chief Information Officer, the Pentagon, Washington, D.C.
11. October 2007 - July 2009, Commander, Air Force Cyber Command (Provisional), Barksdale AFB, La.
12. July 2009 - August 2012, Chief of Warfighting Integration and Chief Information Officer, Office of the Secretary of the Air Force, the Pentagon, Washington, D.C.

== Awards and decorations ==
Personal decorations
	Air Force Distinguished Service Medal
	Defense Superior Service Medal
Width-44 crimson ribbon with a pair of width-2 white stripes on the edges	Legion of Merit with three bronze oak leaf clusters
	Defense Meritorious Service Medal with one bronze oak leaf cluster
Width-44 crimson ribbon with two width-8 white stripes at distance 4 from the edges.	Meritorious Service Medal with two bronze oak leaf clusters
	Air Force Commendation Medal
	Air Force Achievement Medal
Unit awards
	Joint Meritorious Unit Award with three bronze oak leaf clusters
	Air Force Outstanding Unit Award with three bronze oak leaf clusters
	Air Force Organizational Excellence Award with three oak leaf clusters
Service Awards
	Combat Readiness Medal with three bronze oak leaf clusters
	Air Force Recognition Ribbon with two bronze oak leaf clusters
Width=44 scarlet ribbon with a central width-4 golden yellow stripe, flanked by pairs of width-1 scarlet, white, Old Glory blue, and white stripes	National Defense Service Medal with one bronze service star
	Global War on Terrorism Service Medal
	Humanitarian Service Medal
Service, training, and marksmanship awards
	Air Force Overseas Long Tour Service Ribbon
	Air Force Longevity Service Award with silver and three bronze oak leaf clusters
	Small Arms Expert Marksmanship Ribbon
	Air Force Training Ribbon

Other devices
Command Cyberspace Operations Badge
Basic Space Operations Badge
Command Communications and Information Badge
Basic Communications Maintenance Badge
Basic Parachutist Badge
Basic Missile Operations Badge
Headquarters Air Force badge
Presidential Service Badge

== Effective dates of promotion ==
Promotions
Insignia	Rank	Date
	Lieutenant General	July 27, 2009
	Major General	Feb. 1, 2006
	Brigadier General	Oct. 1, 2002
	Colonel	Sept. 1, 1996
	Lieutenant Colonel	July 1, 1991
	Major	March 1, 1987
	Captain	June 1, 1981
	First Lieutenant	June 1, 1979
	Second Lieutenant	June 1, 1977
