= Jim Lord (singer-songwriter) =

American singer-songwriter

- Lord performing in October 2008

Background information
- Born: September 7, 1948 (age 76); Jersey City, New Jersey, US
- Genres: Folk
- Occupation(s): Musician, songwriter
- Instrument: Guitar
- Years active: 1974–present
- Labels: Inlet Records; Blue Vinyl Records
- Website: www.jimlord.com

James Edward Lord III (born September 7, 1948) is an American folk/rock singer-songwriter and musician.

== Early life ==
Born in Jersey City, New Jersey, Lord's early influences included such artists as James Taylor and Leonard Cohen. Later, Lord became inspired by artists of the British folk/blues revival, especially Bert Jansch and Ralph McTell, and moved to London in 1974 to explore the folk music scene.

== Career ==
While there, he performed throughout Britain as a headliner and also shared the bill with such artists as Bert Jansch, Tim Hardin and Elvis Costello. After returning to the United States, Lord shared the bill with such artists as Richie Havens, The Rowan Brothers, Sonny Terry & Brownie McGhee, Sam & Dave, Vassar Clements, Albert King and Brewer & Shipley, among others.

Lord's first album "Inside Out", produced by former "Fugs' guitarist Ken Pine and released on the Inlet Records label in October 1982, was a Billboard Magazine Top Billboard Album Pick (recommended LP). Lord's second album "Hangdog Heaven", released on the Blue Vinyl Records label in March 2000 and produced by Ken Pine and Larry Gates, was characterized by the New York Post as a "...dozen-song man-and-a-guitar disc [that] freely crosses the borders of folk rock, contemporary country and old-fashioned jazz guitar." His third album, "Live at Quad Studios", was recorded live at Quad Lakeside Recording Studios in Greenwood Lake, NY on October 5, 2009. "Live at Quad Studios" was released by Blue Vinyl Records. The recording features E'lissa Jones on violin, djembe, and vocals; and Dave Edwards on bass, guitar, and vocals. Jim's fourth album, "Live at Armando's" was recorded live at Armando's in Martinez California on November 7, 2016. His fifth album, "Little Star", was recorded at Windfall Studios in Floyd Virginia and was co-produced with David Fason. The record features Van Manakas on electric guitar, Joe DeJarnette on bass, Mike Mitchell on violin, Sam Kephart on viola and Butch Robins on banjo.

Influences include Bert Jansch, Ralph McTell, James Taylor, Leonard Cohen and Tom Waits.

== Discography ==
- Inside Out (1982)
- Hangdog Heaven (2000)
- Live at Quad Studios (2009)
- Live at Armando's (2016)
- Little Star (2020)
