= Gary Lord (artist) =

American painter

Gary Lord (born 1952) is a Cincinnati, Ohio-based faux painting artist and teacher. He owns a decorative painting business, Gary Lord Wall Options and Associates Inc, and is the founder of Prismatic Painting Studio and ItsFauxEasy.com, a video-based faux painting teaching site. He has been teaching faux painting techniques for over 25 years via seminars, DVDs, the Internet, and best-selling books. He has also appeared on hundreds of television segments demonstrating faux painting and decorating techniques. From 2002 - 2019 Gary's work has won a total of ten National 1st Place Awards for Best Faux Finisher of the Year by the Painting and Decorating Contractors of America and by the American Painting Contractor. He also was named to the top spot by American Painting Contractor for Who's Who in Decorative Painting in America in 2007.

== Author ==
He has written five books It's Faux Easy, Mural Painting Secrets for Success, Great Paint Finishes For a Gorgeous Home, and Marvelous Murals You Can Paint. Simply Creative Faux Finishes.

He is a regular contributor to several national and trade faux painting publications including The Faux Finisher, The Decorative Painter, Profiles in Faux, American Painting Contractor, Faux Effects World, P.W.C., Paint Pro, Artistic Stenciler, The Artist Magazine, Artisphere, and Architectural Living.

== Television appearances ==
Lord is a regular guest on HGTV's Decorating With Style and has appeared on PBS's Paint Paint Paint, Discovery Channel's Christopher Lowell Show, D.I.Y., Around the House, Home Works, and The Carol Duvall Show, as well as many local shows/segments featuring faux painting.
