= Great Britain at the 1964 Winter Olympics =

- Flag of the United Kingdom
- IOC code: GBR (GBI used at these Games)
- NOC: British Olympic Association

in Innsbruck
- Competitors: 36 (27 men, 9 women) in 7 sports
- Flag bearer: Keith Schellenberg (luge)
- Medals Ranked 11th: Gold 1 Silver 0 Bronze 0 Total 1

Winter Olympics appearances (overview)
- 1924; 1928; 1932; 1936; 1948; 1952; 1956; 1960; 1964; 1968; 1972; 1976; 1980; 1984; 1988; 1992; 1994; 1998; 2002; 2006; 2010; 2014; 2018; 2022; 2026

The United Kingdom of Great Britain and Northern Ireland competed as Great Britain at the 1964 Winter Olympics in Innsbruck, Austria.

British luger Kazimierz Kay-Skrzypecki was killed on the Olympic course two weeks before the games.

== Medallists ==
| Medal | Name | Sport | Event |
|---|---|---|---|
| Gold | Robin Dixon; Tony Nash | Bobsleigh | Two-man |

== Alpine skiing ==
Men

| Athlete | Event | Race | |
| Athlete | Event | Time | Rank |
|---|---|---|---|
| Jonathan Taylor | Downhill | DNF | – |
| Charles Palmer-Tomkinson | Downhill | 2:39.97 | 56 |
| Charles Westenholz | Downhill | 2:36.12 | 50 |
| John Rigby | Downhill | 2:34.32 | 44 |
| Charles Palmer-Tomkinson | Giant Slalom | DSQ | – |
| Charles Westenholz | Giant Slalom | DNF | – |
| Piers Westenholz | Giant Slalom | 2:17.10 | 59 |
| John Rigby | Giant Slalom | 2:07.92 | 42 |

Men's slalom

| Athlete | Qualifying | | | | Final | | | | | |
| Athlete | Time 1 | Rank | Time 2 | Rank | Time 1 | Rank | Time 2 | Rank | Total | Rank |
|---|---|---|---|---|---|---|---|---|---|---|
| John Rigby | 1:12.16 | 68 | 1:02.45 | 35 | did not advance | | | | | |
| Jonathan Taylor | 1:08.73 | 64 | 1:01.33 | 29 | did not advance | | | | | |
| Piers Westenholz | 1:05.12 | 54 | 1:01.89 | 31 | did not advance | | | | | |
| Charles Westenholz | 1:01.96 | 50 | 1:00.99 | 28 | did not advance | | | | | |

Women

| Athlete | Event | Race 1 | | Race 2 | | Total | |
| Athlete | Event | Time | Rank | Time | Rank | Time | Rank |
|---|---|---|---|---|---|---|---|
| Anna Asheshov | Downhill | | | | | 2:05.41 | 38 |
| Tania Heald | Downhill | | | | | 2:04.82 | 35 |
| Divina Galica | Downhill | | | | | 2:04.10 | 30 |
| Gina Hathorn | Downhill | | | | | 2:02.20 | 16 |
| Wendy Farrington | Giant Slalom | | | | | DSQ | – |
| Gina Hathorn | Giant Slalom | | | | | 2:02.61 | 27 |
| Jane Gissing | Giant Slalom | | | | | 2:01.66 | 24 |
| Divina Galica | Giant Slalom | | | | | 2:00.79 | 23 |
| Divina Galica | Slalom | DSQ | – | – | – | DSQ | – |
| Gina Hathorn | Slalom | DSQ | – | – | – | DSQ | – |
| Tania Heald | Slalom | 52.03 | 26 | 56.40 | 23 | 1:48.43 | 21 |
| Jane Gissing | Slalom | 49.70 | 19 | 54.48 | 20 | 1:44.18 | 17 |

== Biathlon ==
Men

| Event | Athlete | Time | Misses | Adjusted time ^{1} | Rank |
|---|---|---|---|---|---|
| 20 km | Roderick Tuck | 1'33:55.5 | 9 | 1'51:55.5 | 43 |
| 20 km | John Moore | 1'27:49.4 | 10 | 1'47:49.4 | 40 |
| 20 km | Alan Notley | 1'36:10.3 | 5 | 1'46:10.3 | 37 |
| 20 km | John Dent | 1'30:27.2 | 3 | 1'36:27.2 | 29 |

^{1} Two minutes added per miss.

== Bobsleigh ==
Nash and Dixon won the race after being loaned an axle bolt by the Italian bobsledder Eugenio Monti, who finished third but would be given the first De Coubertin Medal for sportsmanship.

| Sled | Athletes | Event | Run 1 | | Run 2 | | Run 3 | | Run 4 | | Total | |
| Sled | Athletes | Event | Time | Rank | Time | Rank | Time | Rank | Time | Rank | Time | Rank |
|---|---|---|---|---|---|---|---|---|---|---|---|---|
| GBR-1 | Tony Nash; Robin Dixon | Two-man | 1:05.53 | 2 | 1:05.10 | 2 | 1:05.39 | 3 | 1:05.88 | 1 | 4:21.90 | 1st place, gold medalist(s) |
| GBR-2 | Bill McCowen; Andrew Hedges | Two-man | 1:07.47 | 15 | 1:07.73 | 15 | 1:06.52 | 9 | 1:08.95 | 18 | 4:30.67 | 16 |

| Sled | Athletes | Event | Run 1 | | Run 2 | | Run 3 | | Run 4 | | Total | |
| Sled | Athletes | Event | Time | Rank | Time | Rank | Time | Rank | Time | Rank | Time | Rank |
|---|---|---|---|---|---|---|---|---|---|---|---|---|
| GBR-1 | Tony Nash; Guy Renwick; David Lewis; Robin Dixon | Four-man | 1:04.56 | 12 | 1:05.07 | 16 | 1:04.64 | 9 | 1:05.13 | 12 | 4:19.40 | 12 |
| GBR-2 | Bill McCowen; Robin Widdows; Robin Seel; Andrew Hedges | Four-man | 1:04.49 | 11 | 1:04.68 | 14 | 1:05.53 | 15 | 1:04.73 | 9 | 4:19.43 | 13 |

== Cross-country skiing ==
Men

| Event | Athlete | Race | |
| Event | Athlete | Time | Rank |
|---|---|---|---|
| 15 km | Frederick Andrew | 1'06:51.4 | 69 |
| 15 km | David Rees | 1'03:06.8 | 66 |
| 15 km | Andrew Morgan | 1'02:20.9 | 62 |
| 15 km | John Moore | 1'00:16.6 | 56 |
| 30 km | Roderick Tuck | 1'47:52.6 | 55 |

Men's 4 × 10 km relay

| Athletes | Race | |
| Athletes | Time | Rank |
|---|---|---|
| John Moore; John Dent; David Rees; Roderick Tuck | 2'42:55.8 | 14 |

== Figure skating ==
Men

| Athlete | CF | FS | Points | Places | Rank |
|---|---|---|---|---|---|
| Malcolm Cannon | 18 | 24 | 1587.5 | 187 | 20 |
| Hywel Evans | 15 | 22 | 1640.1 | 159 | 18 |

Women

| Athlete | CF | FS | Points | Places | Rank |
|---|---|---|---|---|---|
| Diana Clifton-Peach | 11 | 25 | 1711.7 | 152 | 18 |
| Carol-Ann Warner | 12 | 22 | 1692.9 | 162 | 16 |
| Sally-Anne Stapleford | 7 | 19 | 1757.9 | 108 | 11 |

== Luge ==
British luger Kazimierz Kay-Skrzypecki was killed on the Olympic course two weeks before the games.

Men

| Athlete | Run 1 | | Run 2 | | Run 3 | | Run 4 | | Total | |
| Athlete | Time | Rank | Time | Rank | Time | Rank | Time | Rank | Time | Rank |
|---|---|---|---|---|---|---|---|---|---|---|
| Gordon Porteus | 1:00.98 | 28 | DSQ | – | – | – | – | – | DSQ | – |
| Keith Schellenberg | 58.69 | 26 | 59.06 | 25 | 58.14 | 26 | 58.87 | 27 | 3:54.76 | 25 |

== Speed skating ==
Men

| Event | Athlete | Race | |
| Event | Athlete | Time | Rank |
|---|---|---|---|
| 500 m | Thomas Dawson | 45.2 | 44 |
| 500 m | Terry Malkin | 42.6 | 27 |
| 1500 m | Thomas Dawson | 2:26.4 | 49 |
| 1500 m | Tony Bullen | 2:23.7 | 45 |
| 1500 m | Terry Malkin | 2:13.3 | 11 |
| 5000 m | Tony Bullen | 8:12.4 | 22 |
| 5000 m | Terry Malkin | 7:59.4 | 16 |
| 10,000 m | Tony Bullen | 17:19.8 | 28 |
| 10,000 m | Terry Malkin | 16:35.2 | 8 |
