= Finland at the 1960 Winter Olympics =

- IOC code: FIN
- NOC: Finnish Olympic Committee
- Website: sport.fi/olympiakomitea (in Finnish and Swedish)

in Squaw Valley
- Competitors: 48 (42 men, 6 women) in 6 sports
- Flag bearers: Paavo Korhonen, Nordic Combined
- Medals Ranked 6th: Gold 2 Silver 3 Bronze 3 Total 8

Winter Olympics appearances (overview)
- 1924; 1928; 1932; 1936; 1948; 1952; 1956; 1960; 1964; 1968; 1972; 1976; 1980; 1984; 1988; 1992; 1994; 1998; 2002; 2006; 2010; 2014; 2018; 2022; 2026

Finland competed at the 1960 Winter Olympics in Squaw Valley, California, United States.

== Medalists ==
Medal	Name	Sport	Event
Gold	Kalevi Hämäläinen	Cross-country skiing	Men's 50 km
Gold	Toimi Alatalo; Veikko Hakulinen; Väinö Huhtala; Eero Mäntyranta	Cross-country skiing	Men's 4 × 10 km relay
Silver	Antti Tyrväinen	Biathlon	Men's 20 km
Silver	Veikko Hakulinen	Cross-country skiing	Men's 50 km
Silver	Niilo Halonen	Ski jumping	Men's normal hill (K90 individual 70m)
Bronze	Veikko Hakulinen	Cross-country skiing	Men's 15 km
Bronze	Toini Pöysti; Siiri Rantanen; Eeva Ruoppa	Cross-country skiing	Women's 3 x 5 km relay
Bronze	Eevi Huttunen	Speed skating	Women's 3000m

== Biathlon ==
Men

Event	Athlete	Time	Missed targets	Adjusted time ^{1}	Rank
20 km	Pentti Taskinen	1'36:29.7	7	1'50:29.7	18
20 km	Eero Laine	1'33:28.3	7	1'47:28.3	15
20 km	Martti Meinilä	1'29:17.0	5	1'39:17.0	8
20 km	Antti Tyrväinen	1'29:57.7	2	1'33:57.7	2nd place, silver medalist(s)

^{1} Two minutes added per missed target.

== Cross-country skiing ==
Men

Event	Athlete	Race	
Event	Athlete	Time	Rank
15 km	Toimi Alatalo	54:52.7	23
15 km	Väinö Huhtala	53:11.5	13
15 km	Eero Mäntyranta	52:40.6	6
15 km	Veikko Hakulinen	52:03.0	3rd place, bronze medalist(s)
30 km	Arto Tiainen	1'58:56.6	18
30 km	Kalevi Hämäläinen	1'56:54.4	12
30 km	Toimi Alatalo	1'54:06.5	7
30 km	Veikko Hakulinen	1'54:02.0	6
50 km	Veikko Räsänen	3'06:04.4	8
50 km	Pentti Pelkonen	3'05:24.5	6
50 km	Veikko Hakulinen	2'59:26.7	2nd place, silver medalist(s)
50 km	Kalevi Hämäläinen	2'59:06.3	1st place, gold medalist(s)

Men's 4 × 10 km relay

Athletes	Race	
Athletes	Time	Rank
Toimi Alatalo; Eero Mäntyranta; Väinö Huhtala; Veikko Hakulinen	2'18:45.6	1st place, gold medalist(s)

Women

Event	Athlete	Race	
Event	Athlete	Time	Rank
10 km	Eva Hög	44:05.0	17
10 km	Siiri Rantanen	42:52.7	15
10 km	Eeva Ruoppa	42:12.8	11
10 km	Toini Pöysti	40:41.9	6

Women's 3 x 5 km relay

Athletes	Race	
Athletes	Time	Rank
Siiri Rantanen; Eeva Ruoppa; Toini Pöysti	1'06:27.5	3rd place, bronze medalist(s)

== Ice hockey ==
=== Group B ===
Top two teams (shaded ones) from each group advanced to the final round and played for 1st-6th places, other teams played in the consolation round.

Rank	Team	Pld	W	L	T	GF	GA	Pts
1	Soviet Union	2	2	0	0	16	4	4
2	Germany	2	1	1	0	4	9	2
3	Finland	2	0	2	0	5	12	0

- USSR 8-4 Finland
- Germany (UTG) 4-1 Finland

=== Consolation round ===
Team	Pld	W	L	T	GF	GA	Pts
Finland 7th	4	3	0	1	50	11	7
Japan	4	2	1	1	32	22	5
Australia	4	0	4	0	8	57	0

- Finland 14-1 Australia
- Finland 6-6 Japan
- Finland 19-2 Australia
- Finland 11-2 Japan

Contestants; Yrjö Hakala; Raimo Kilpiö; Erkki Koiso; Juhani Lahtinen; Matti Lampainen; Esko Luostarinen; Esko Niemi; Pertti Nieminen; Kalevi Numminen; Heino Pulli; Kalevi Rassa; Teppo Rastio; Jorma Salmi; Jouni Seistamo; Voitto Soini; Seppo Vainio; Juhani Wahlsten

== Nordic combined ==
Events:

- normal hill ski jumping (Three jumps, best two counted and shown here.)
- 15 km cross-country skiing

Athlete	Event	Ski Jumping				Cross-country			Total	
Athlete	Event	Distance 1	Distance 2	Points	Rank	Time	Points	Rank	Points	Rank
Martti Maatela	Individual	56.0	64.5	202.0	17	1'06:13.5	210.000	24	412.000	23
Pekka Ristola	Individual	62.0	63.5	214.0	6	59:32.8	235.871	6	449.871	4
Ensio Hyytiä	Individual	63.5	63.0	212.5	9	1'08:14.0	202.258	29	414.758	22
Paavo Korhonen	Individual	62.5	62.0	197.5	24	59:08.0	237.484	3	434.984	9

== Ski jumping ==
Athlete	Event	Jump 1			Jump 2			Total	
Athlete	Event	Distance	Points	Rank	Distance	Points	Rank	Points	Rank
Veikko Kankkonen	Normal hill	86.5 fall	72.0	44	75.0	96.0	32	168.0	40
Eino Kirjonen	Normal hill	85.5	104.2	12	79.5	101.6	21	205.8	17
Juhani Kärkinen	Normal hill	87.5	108.3	4	82.0	103.1	14	211.4	8
Niilo Halonen	Normal hill	92.5	111.3	2	83.5	111.3	3	222.6	2nd place, silver medalist(s)

== Speed skating ==
Men

Event	Athlete	Race	
Event	Athlete	Time	Rank
500 m	Jouko Jokinen	45.1	42
500 m	Leo Tynkkynen	42.1	19
500 m	Juhani Järvinen	41.8	16
500 m	Toivo Salonen	40.9	7
1500 m	Keijo Tapiovaara	2:19.2	23
1500 m	Toivo Salonen	2:13.1	7
1500 m	Juhani Järvinen	2:13.1	5
1500 m	Jouko Jokinen	2:12.0	4
5000 m	Leo Tynkkynen	8:24.3	21
5000 m	Juhani Järvinen	8:19.2	15
5000 m	Keijo Tapiovaara	8:09.1	7
10,000 m	Leo Tynkkynen	17:33.6	24
10,000 m	Keijo Tapiovaara	16:37.2	9
10,000 m	Juhani Järvinen	16:35.4	8

Women

Event	Athlete	Race	
Event	Athlete	Time	Rank
500 m	Eevi Huttunen	48.6	14
500 m	Iris Sihvonen	48.1	11
1000 m	Iris Sihvonen	1:37.3	10
1000 m	Eevi Huttunen	1:37.2	9
1500 m	Eevi Huttunen	2:35.1	14
1500 m	Iris Sihvonen	2:29.7	6
3000 m	Iris Sihvonen	5:35.2	12
3000 m	Eevi Huttunen	5:21.0	3rd place, bronze medalist(s)
