= Speed skating at the 1964 Winter Olympics – Men's 1500 metres =

Speed skating at the Olympics

Men's 1500 metres speed skating at the IX Olympic Winter Games
- Pictogram for speed skating
- Venue: Eisschnelllaufbahn Innsbruck
- Date: 6 February 1964
- Competitors: 54 from 20 nations
- Winning time: 2:10.3

Medalists
| 1st place, gold medalist(s) | | Ants Antson | Soviet Union |
| 2nd place, silver medalist(s) | | Kees Verkerk | Netherlands |
| 3rd place, bronze medalist(s) | | Villy Haugen | Norway |

The men's 1500 metres in speed skating at the 1964 Winter Olympics took place on 6 February, at the Eisschnellaufbahn.

== Records ==
Prior to this competition, the existing world and Olympic records were as follows:

| World record | Juhani Järvinen (FIN) | 2:06.3 | Squaw Valley, United States | 1 March 1959 |
| Olympic record | Yevgeny Grishin (URS); Yuri Mikhailov (URS) | 2:08.6 | Cortina d'Ampezzo, Italy | 30 January 1956 |

== Results ==
| Rank | Athlete | Country | Time |
|---|---|---|---|
| 1st place, gold medalist(s) | Ants Antson | Soviet Union | 2:10.3 |
| 2nd place, silver medalist(s) | Kees Verkerk | Netherlands | 2:10.6 |
| 3rd place, bronze medalist(s) | Villy Haugen | Norway | 2:11.2 |
| 4 | Jouko Launonen | Finland | 2:11.9 |
| 5 | Lev Zaytsev | Soviet Union | 2:12.1 |
| 6 | Ivar Eriksen | Norway | 2:12.2 |
| 6 | Eduard Matusevich | Soviet Union | 2:12.2 |
| 8 | Juhani Järvinen | Finland | 2:12.4 |
| 9 | Magne Thomassen | Norway | 2:12.5 |
| 10 | Rudi Liebrechts | Netherlands | 2:12.8 |
| 11 | Yevgeny Grishin | Soviet Union | 2:13.3 |
| 11 | Terry Malkin | Great Britain | 2:13.3 |
| 13 | Ard Schenk | Netherlands | 2:13.4 |
| 14 | Ri Sung-Ryool | North Korea | 2:13.9 |
| 15 | Dick Hunt | United States | 2:14.4 |
| 16 | Nils Aaness | Norway | 2:14.6 |
| 17 | Günter Traub | United Team of Germany | 2:15.3 |
| 18 | Örjan Sandler | Sweden | 2:15.4 |
| 19 | Jouko Jokinen | Finland | 2:15.6 |
| 19 | Ivar Nilsson | Sweden | 2:15.6 |
| 21 | Renato De Riva | Italy | 2:15.7 |
| 22 | André Kouprianoff | France | 2:15.8 |
| 23 | Seppo Hänninen | Finland | 2:16.0 |
| 24 | Manne Lavås | Sweden | 2:16.2 |
| 25 | Buddy Campbell | United States | 2:16.4 |
| 26 | Herbert Höfl | United Team of Germany | 2:16.8 |
| 26 | Eddie Rudolph, Jr. | United States | 2:16.8 |
| 28 | Bo Ollander | Sweden | 2:17.1 |
| 29 | Gerd Zimmermann | United Team of Germany | 2:17.3 |
| 30 | Kurt Stille | Denmark | 2:17.4 |
| 31 | Keiichi Suzuki | Japan | 2:17.5 |
| 32 | Oldřich Teplý | Czechoslovakia | 2:17.9 |
| 33 | Hermann Strutz | Austria | 2:18.0 |
| 34 | Satoshi Shinpo | Japan | 2:18.5 |
| 35 | Elio Locatelli | Italy | 2:19.0 |
| 36 | Kim Zin-Hook | North Korea | 2:19.4 |
| 37 | Ralf Olin | Canada | 2:19.7 |
| 38 | György Ivánkai | Hungary | 2:19.9 |
| 39 | Jürgen Schmidt | United Team of Germany | 2:20.0 |
| 40 | Choi Yeong-Bae | South Korea | 2:20.3 |
| 41 | Toyofumi Aruga | Japan | 2:20.7 |
| 42 | Floyd Bedbury | United States | 2:21.3 |
| 43 | Raymond Fonvieille | France | 2:22.6 |
| 44 | Ruedi Uster | Switzerland | 2:23.4 |
| 45 | Tony Bullen | Great Britain | 2:23.7 |
| 46 | Luvsanlkhagvyn Dashnyam | Mongolia | 2:23.9 |
| 47 | Gerald Koning | Canada | 2:24.0 |
| 48 | Peter Toyfl | Austria | 2:24.2 |
| 49 | Thomas Dawson | Great Britain | 2:26.4 |
| 50 | Mihály Martos | Hungary | 2:26.8 |
| 51 | Josef Reisinger | Austria | 2:27.8 |
| 52 | Choi Nam-yeon | South Korea | 2:30.2 |
| 53 | Jean-Pierre Guéron | Switzerland | 2:32.3 |
| - | Erich Korbel | Austria | DQ |
