= David Hobart =

David Hobart may refer to:

- David Hobart (bobsleigh)
- David Hobart (RAF officer)
- David E. Hobart (American nuclear chemist)
