= Ann Reid (disambiguation) =

Ann Reid is an American scientist.

Ann Reid, or variants, may also refer to:

- Anne Reid, English actress
- Anne Reid (skier), New Zealand skier
- SS Anne Reed, multiple ships
- Ann Reed, American musician
