= Finnish Sports Personality of the Year =

Award

The Finnish Sports Personality of the Year (Finnish: Vuoden urheilija; Swedish: Årets finländska idrottare) is chosen annually since 1947 by the national sports journalists. In addition, the best female athlete (Finnish: Vuoden naisurheilija) was nominated each year separately from 1949 to 2009.

== Winners ==
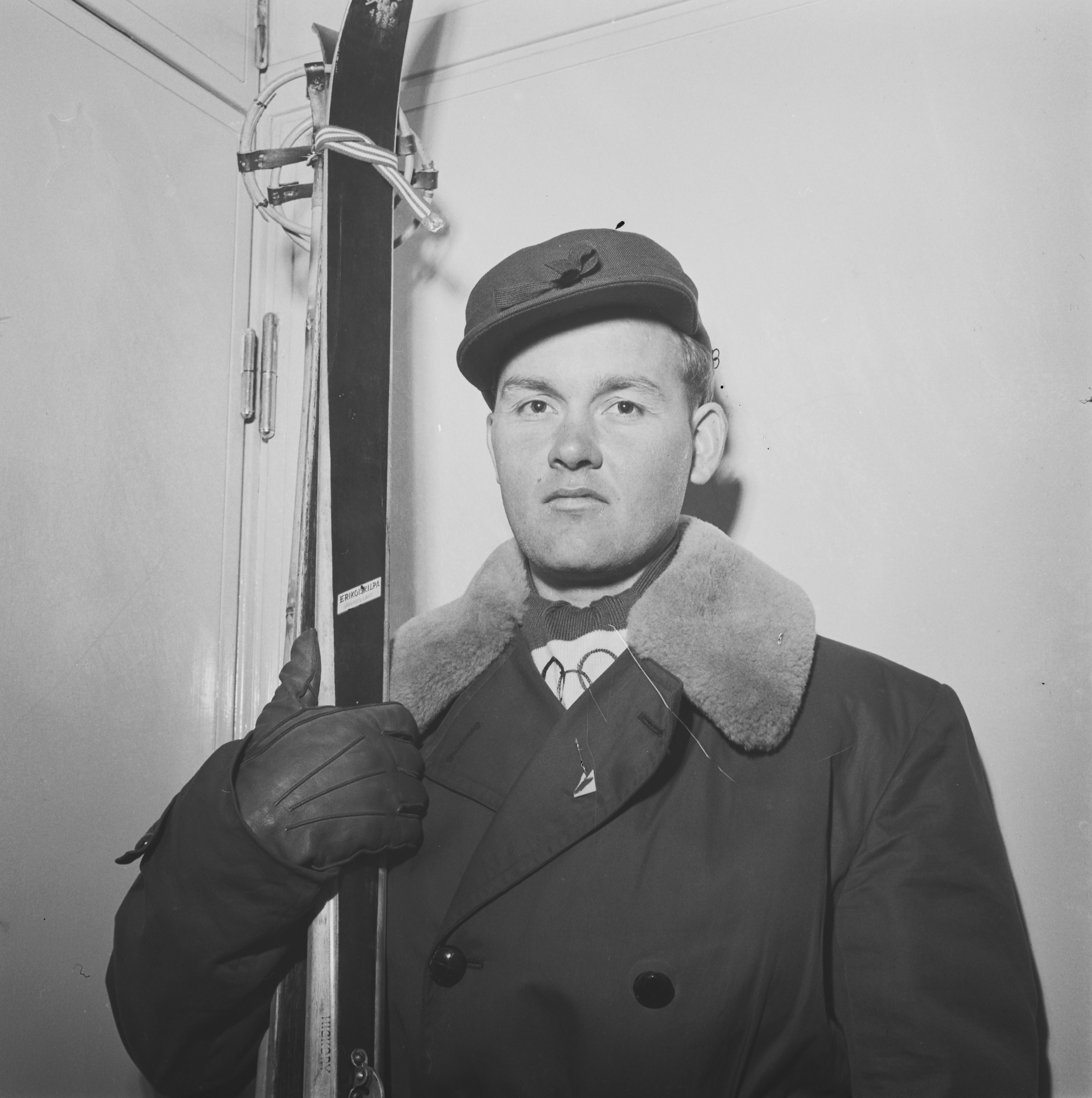
Cross-country skier Veikko Hakulinen won the award four times

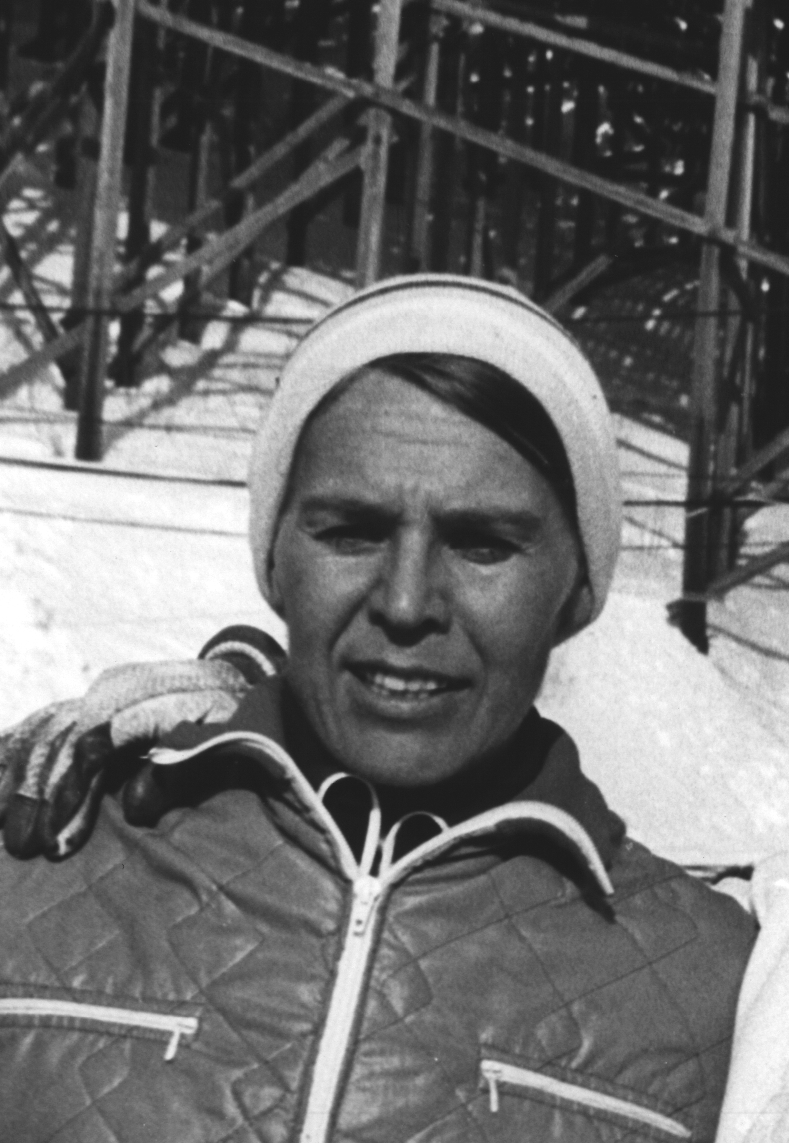
Cross-country skier Marjatta Kajosmaa won the women's award four times

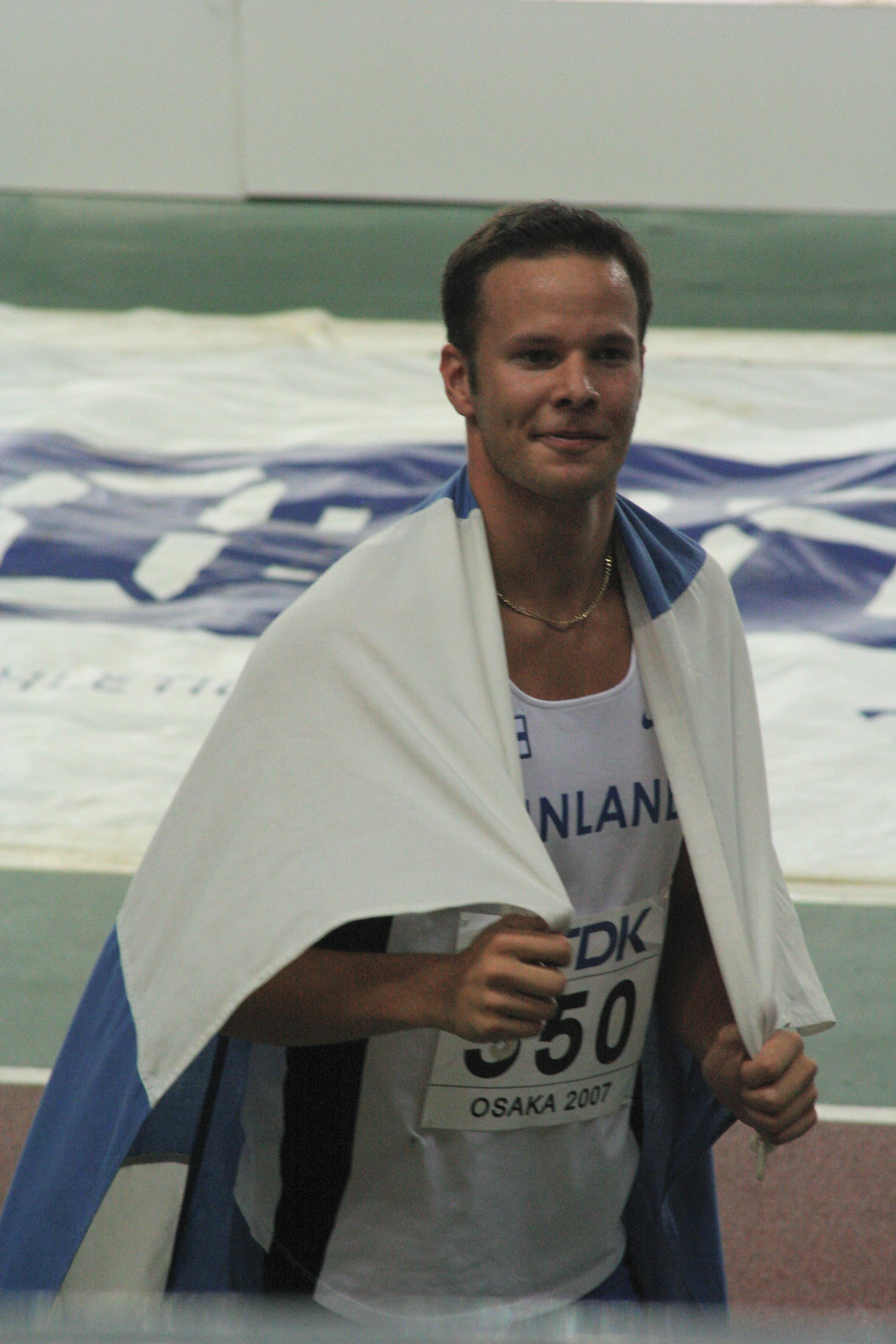
Javelin thrower Tero Pitkämäki won the award three times

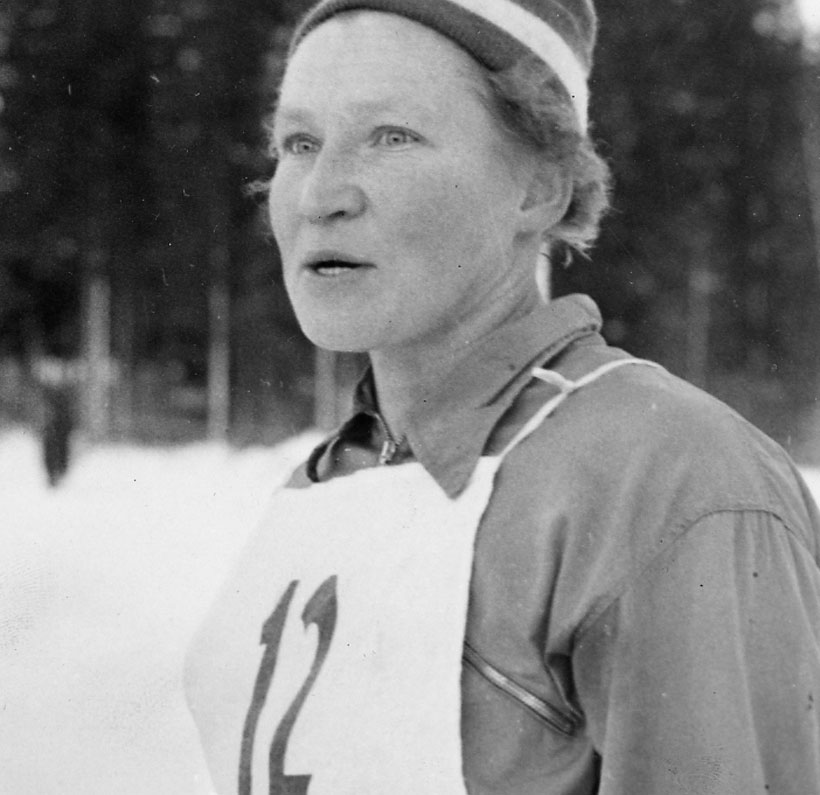
Cross-country skier Siiri Rantanen won the women's award four times

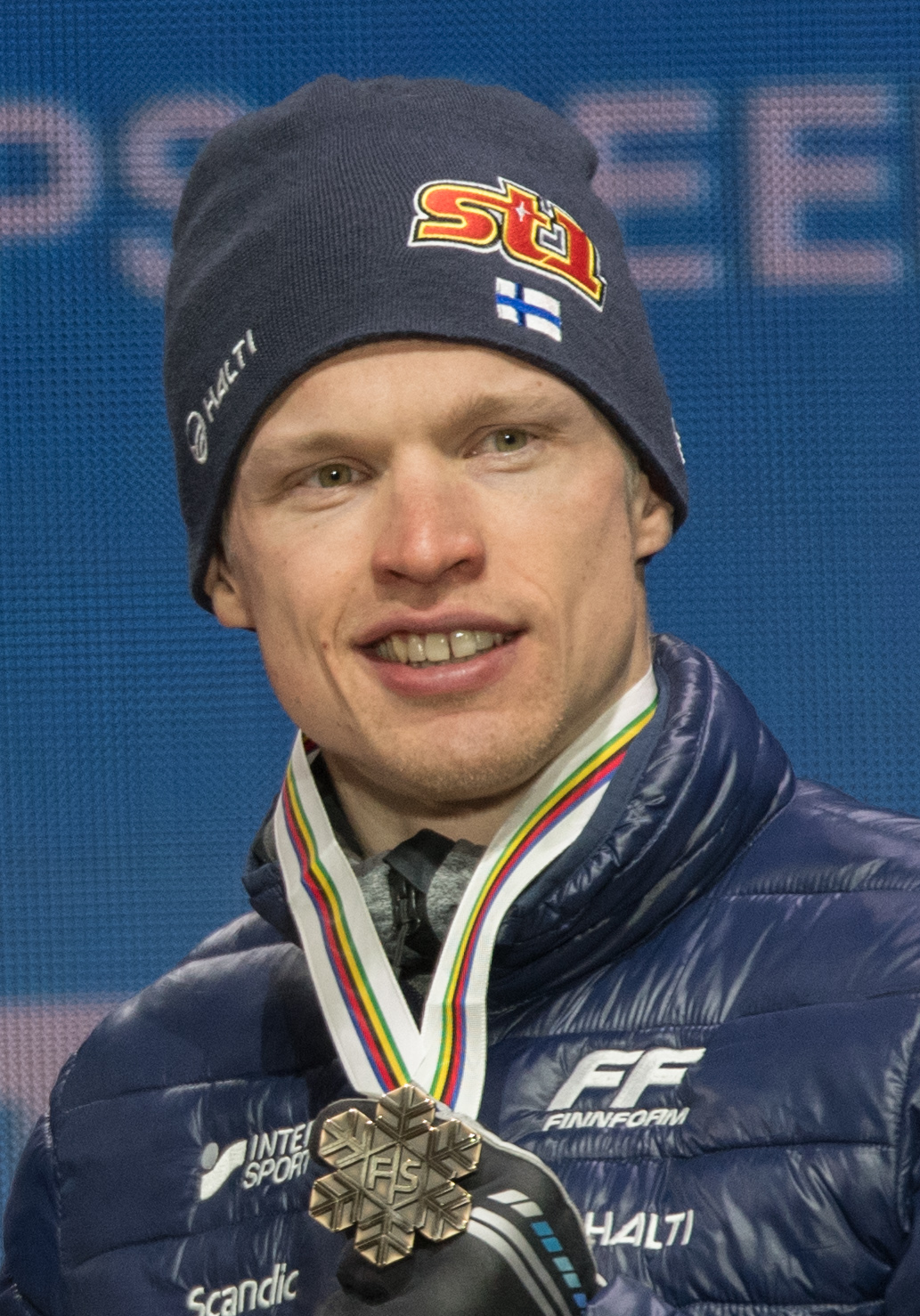
Cross-country skier Iivo Niskanen has won the award four times

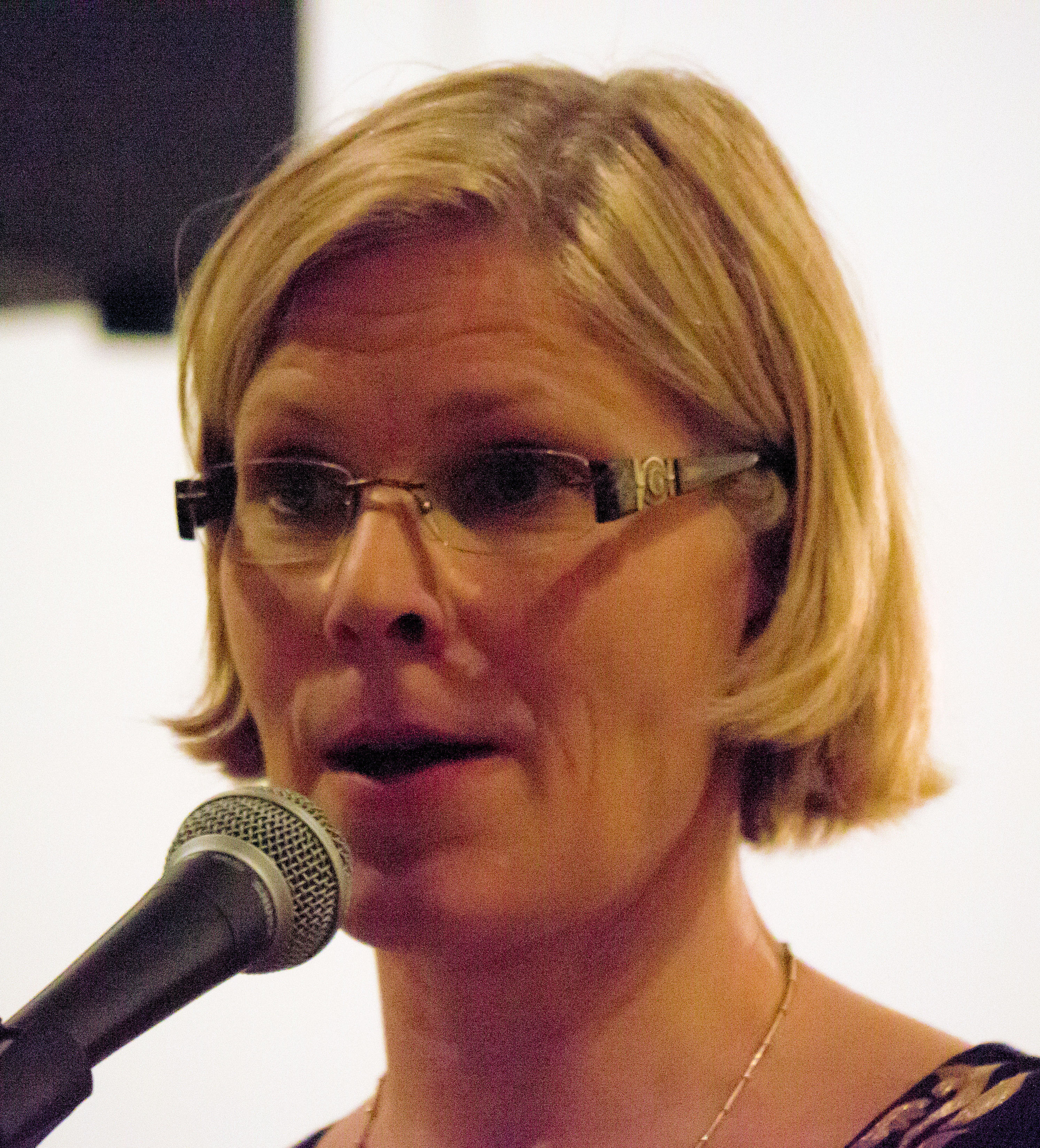
Cross-country skier Marjo Matikainen won the main award three times and the women's award once

| Year | Winner | Sport | Win # |
|---|---|---|---|
| 1947 | Mikko Hietanen; Lassi Parkkinen | Track and field Speed skating | 1; 1 |
| 1948 | Heikki Hasu | Nordic skiing | 1 |
| 1949 | Viljo Heino | Track and field | 1 |
| 1950 | Heikki Hasu | Nordic skiing | 2 |
| 1951 | Veikko Karvonen | Track and field | 1 |
| 1952 | Veikko Hakulinen | Nordic skiing | 1 |
| 1953 | Veikko Hakulinen | Nordic skiing | 2 |
| 1954 | Veikko Hakulinen | Nordic skiing | 3 |
| 1955 | Voitto Hellsten | Track and field | 1 |
| 1956 | Antti Hyvärinen | Nordic skiing | 1 |
| 1957 | Olavi Vuorisalo | Track and field | 1 |
| 1958 | Vilho Ylönen | Shooting sports | 1 |
| 1959 | Juhani Järvinen | Speed skating | 1 |
| 1960 | Veikko Hakulinen | Nordic skiing | 4 |
| 1961 | Kalevi Huuskonen | Biathlon | 1 |
| 1962 | Pentti Nikula | Track and field | 1 |
| 1963 | Pentti Eskola | Track and field | 1 |
| 1964 | Eero Mäntyranta | Nordic skiing | 1 |
| 1965 | Jouko Launonen | Speed skating | 1 |
| 1966 | Eero Mäntyranta | Nordic skiing | 2 |
| 1967 | Eero Tapio | Amateur wrestling | 1 |
| 1968 | Kaarlo Kangasniemi | Olympic weightlifting | 1 |
| 1969 | Kaarlo Kangasniemi | Olympic weightlifting | 2 |
| 1970 | Kalevi Oikarainen | Nordic skiing | 1 |
| 1971 | Juha Väätäinen | Track and field | 1 |
| 1972 | Lasse Virén | Track and field | 1 |
| 1973 | Mona-Lisa Pursiainen | Track and field | 1 |
| 1974 | Riitta Salin | Track and field | 1 |
| 1975 | Heikki Ikola | Biathlon | 1 |
| 1976 | Lasse Virén | Track and field | 2 |
| 1977 | Pertti Ukkola | Amateur wrestling | 1 |
| 1978 | Helena Takalo | Nordic skiing | 1 |
| 1979 | Pertti Karppinen | Rowing | 1 |
| 1980 | Pertti Karppinen | Rowing | 2 |
| 1981 | Heikki Ikola | Biathlon | 2 |
| 1982 | Keijo Rosberg | Auto racing | 1 |
| 1983 | Tiina Lillak | Track and field | 1 |
| 1984 | Marja-Liisa Kirvesniemi | Nordic skiing | 1 |
| 1985 | Matti Nykänen | Nordic skiing | 1 |
| 1986 | Marjo Matikainen | Nordic skiing | 1 |
| 1987 | Marjo Matikainen | Nordic skiing | 2 |
| 1988 | Matti Nykänen | Nordic skiing | 2 |
| 1989 | Marjo Matikainen | Nordic skiing | 3 |
| 1990 | Päivi Alafrantti | Track and field | 1 |
| 1991 | Kimmo Kinnunen | Track and field | 1 |
| 1992 | Toni Nieminen | Nordic skiing | 1 |
| 1993 | Juha Kankkunen | Auto racing | 1 |
| 1994 | Jani Sievinen | Swimming | 1 |
| 1995 | Jari Litmanen | Association football | 1 |
| 1996 | Heli Rantanen | Track and field | 1 |
| 1997 | Mika Myllylä | Nordic skiing | 1 |
| 1998 | Mika Häkkinen | Auto racing | 1 |
| 1999 | Mika Myllylä | Nordic skiing | 2 |
| 2000 | Arsi Harju | Track and field | 1 |
| 2001 | Sami Hyypiä | Association football | 1 |
| 2002 | Samppa Lajunen | Nordic combined | 1 |
| 2003 | Hanna-Maria Seppälä | Swimming | 1 |
| 2004 | Marko Yli-Hannuksela | Amateur wrestling | 1 |
| 2005 | Janne Ahonen | Nordic skiing | 1 |
| 2006 | Jukka Keskisalo | Track and field | 1 |
| 2007 | Tero Pitkämäki | Track and field | 1 |
| 2008 | Satu Mäkelä-Nummela | Shooting sports | 1 |
| 2009 | Aino-Kaisa Saarinen | Nordic skiing | 1 |
| 2010 | Minna Kauppi | Orienteering | 1 |
| 2011 | Kaisa Mäkäräinen | Biathlon | 1 |
| 2012 | Tuuli Petäjä-Sirén | Sailing | 1 |
| 2013 | Tero Pitkämäki | Track and field | 2 |
| 2014 | Iivo Niskanen; Sami Jauhojärvi | Nordic skiing | 1 |
| 2015 | Tero Pitkämäki | Track and field | 3 |
| 2016 | Leo-Pekka Tähti | Wheelchair racing | 1 |
| 2017 | Iivo Niskanen | Nordic skiing | 2 |
| 2018 | Iivo Niskanen | Nordic skiing | 3 |
| 2019 | Teemu Pukki | Association football | 1 |
| 2020 | Lukas Hradecky | Association football | 1 |
| 2021 | Matti Mattsson | Swimming | 1 |
| 2022 | Iivo Niskanen | Nordic skiing | 4 |
| 2023 | Lauri Markkanen | Basketball | 1 |
| 2024 | Aleksander Barkov | Ice hockey | 1 |
| 2025 | Harri Heliövaara | Tennis | 1 |

=== Women ===
| Year | Best female | Sport | Win # |
|---|---|---|---|
| 1949 | Kerttu Pehkonen | Nordic skiing | 1 |
| 1950 | Sylvi Saimo | Canoeing | 1 |
| 1951 | Eevi Huttunen | Speed skating | 1 |
| 1952 | Sylvi Saimo | Canoeing | 2 |
| 1953 | Eevi Huttunen | Speed skating | 2 |
| 1954 | Siiri Rantanen | Nordic skiing | 1 |
| 1955 | Mirja Hietamies | Nordic skiing | 1 |
| 1956 | Siiri Rantanen | Nordic skiing | 2 |
| 1957 | Iiris Sihvonen | Speed skating | 1 |
| 1958 | Siiri Rantanen | Nordic skiing | 3 |
| 1959 | Siiri Rantanen | Nordic skiing | 4 |
| 1960 | Eevi Huttunen | Speed skating | 3 |
| 1961 | Mirja Lehtonen | Nordic skiing | 1 |
| 1962 | Maire Rautakoski | Bowling | 1 |
| 1963 | Mirja Lehtonen | Nordic skiing | 2 |
| 1964 | Kaija Mustonen | Speed skating | 1 |
| 1965 | Maire Lindholm | Archery | 1 |
| 1966 | Eila Pyrhönen | Swimming | 1 |
| 1967 | Eija Krogerus | Bowling | 1 |
| 1968 | Kaija Mustonen | Speed skating | 2 |
| 1969 | Marjatta Kajosmaa | Nordic skiing | 1 |
| 1970 | Marjatta Kajosmaa | Nordic skiing | 2 |
| 1971 | Marjatta Kajosmaa | Nordic skiing | 3 |
| 1972 | Marjatta Kajosmaa | Nordic skiing | 4 |
| 1973 | Mona-Lisa Pursiainen | Track and field | 1 |
| 1974 | Riitta Salin | Track and field | 1 |
| 1975 | Helena Takalo | Nordic skiing | 1 |
| 1976 | Helena Takalo | Nordic skiing | 2 |
| 1977 | Lea Hilokoski | Bowling | 1 |
| 1978 | Helena Takalo | Nordic skiing | 3 |
| 1979 | Outi Borgenström | Foot orienteering | 1 |
| 1980 | Hilkka Riihivuori | Nordic skiing | 1 |
| 1981 | Hilkka Riihivuori | Nordic skiing | 2 |
| 1982 | Hilkka Riihivuori | Nordic skiing | 3 |
| 1983 | Tiina Lillak | Track and field | 1 |
| 1984 | Marja-Liisa Kirvesniemi | Nordic skiing | 1 |
| 1985 | Marja-Liisa Kirvesniemi | Nordic skiing | 2 |
| 1986 | Marjo Matikainen | Nordic skiing | 1 |
| 1987 | Marjo Matikainen | Nordic skiing | 2 |
| 1988 | Marjo Matikainen | Nordic skiing | 3 |
| 1989 | Marjo Matikainen | Nordic skiing | 4 |
| 1990 | Päivi Alafrantti | Track and field | 1 |
| 1991 | Marja-Liisa Kirvesniemi | Nordic skiing | 3 |
| 1992 | Marjut Lukkarinen | Nordic skiing | 1 |
| 1993 | Sari Essayah | Track and field | 1 |
| 1994 | Sari Essayah | Track and field | 2 |
| 1995 | Sari Laine | Karate | 1 |
| 1996 | Heli Rantanen | Track and field | 1 |
| 1997 | Raija Koskinen | Powerlifting | 1 |
| 1998 | Satu Pusila | Shooting sports | 1 |
| 1999 | Tuuli Matinsalo | Sport aerobics | 1 |
| 2000 | Pia Sundstedt | Cycling | 1 |
| 2001 | Pirjo Manninen | Nordic skiing | 1 |
| 2002 | Heli Koivula | Track and field | 1 |
| 2003 | Hanna-Maria Seppälä | Swimming | 1 |
| 2004 | Tanja Poutiainen | Alpine skiing | 1 |
| 2005 | Tanja Poutiainen | Alpine skiing | 2 |
| 2006 | Tanja Poutiainen | Alpine skiing | 3 |
| 2007 | Virpi Kuitunen | Nordic skiing | 1 |
| 2008 | Satu Mäkelä-Nummela | Shooting sports | 1 |
| 2009 | Aino-Kaisa Saarinen | Nordic skiing | 1 |

== See also ==
- Finnish Footballer of the Year
