= Tynkkynen =

Tynkkynen is a Finnish surname. Notable people with the surname include:

- Leo Tynkkynen (1934–1971), Finnish speed skater
- Oras Tynkkynen (born 1977), Finnish politician
- Sebastian Tynkkynen (born 1989), Finnish politician
