= Koiso =

Surname list

Koiso is the surname of the following people

- Erkki Koiso (1934–2000), Finish ice hockey player
- Kuniaki Koiso (1880–1950), Japanese prime minister
- Noriko Koiso (born in 1974), Japanese basketball player
- Ryōhei Koiso (1903–1988), Japanese artist
