= SS Kinshasa =

A number of steamships have been named Kinshasa, including:

- SS Kinshasa (1909), a cargo ship in service 1922-25
- SS Kinshasa (1914), a cargo ship in service 1914-45 or later
- SS Kinshasa (1944), a Hansa A Type cargo ship in service 1946-50
