= Tapiovaara =

Surname list

Tapiovaara is a surname. Notable people with the surname include:

- Ilmari Tapiovaara (1914–1999), Finnish designer
- Keijo Tapiovaara (born 1939), Finnish speed skater
- Nyrki Tapiovaara (1911–1940), Finnish film director
