= SS Pagenturm =

A number of steamships have been named Pagenturm, including:-

- SS Pagenturm (1909), a cargo ship in service 1909–14
- SS Pagenturm (Flensburger, 1944), a Hansa A Type cargo ship in service 1944–45
- SS Pagenturm (Deutsche Werft, 1944), a Hansa A Type cargo ship in service 1956-64
