= Buddy Campbell =

American speed skater

Personal information
- Born: May 14, 1943 (age 83) Huntington, New York, United States

Sport
- Sport: Speed skating

Buddy Campbell (born May 14, 1943) is an American speed skater. He competed in the men's 1500 metres events at the 1964 Winter Olympics.
