= Kerttu Pehkonen =

Finnish cross-country skier (1928–2018)

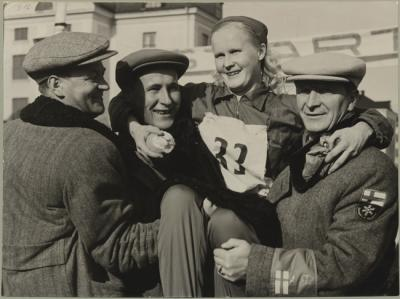

Personal information
- Nationality: Finland
- Born: Kerttu Marjatta Pehkonen; 26 October 1928 Joroinen, Finland
- Died: 23 February 2018 (aged 89) Varkaus, Finland

Sport
- Sport: Skiing

Kerttu Pehkonen (26 October 1928 – 23 February 2018) was the first female competitive cross-country skier who won numerous prestigious Nordic cross country competitions such as the Lahti Ski Games.

In 1947 Pehkonen won the first female Finnish Sports Personality of the Year award.
