= Dare Wilson =

British Army general

Major-General Dare Wilson CBE MC
- Born: Ronald Dare Wilson
- Military career
- Allegiance: United Kingdom
- Branch: British Army
- Service years: 1939–1971
- Rank: Major-General
- Service number: 96170
- Units: Royal Northumberland Fusiliers; Reconnaissance Corps; Parachute Regiment; Special Air Service
- Conflicts: Second World War; Korean War; Cold War
- Awards: Military Cross; Member of the Order of the British Empire; Commander of the Order of the British Empire

Dare Wilson
Medal record
Commonwealth Winter Games
Bronze medal – third place	1958 St Moritz	Skeleton - Men's Singles

Major-General Ronald Dare Wilson, CBE, MC (3 August 1919 – 15 August 2014) was a senior British Army officer, author, and park warden. He was decorated during World War II, commanded 22 Special Air Service Regiment in the early 1960s and ended his military career as Director of Army Aviation. He was instrumental in introducing attack helicopters and high-altitude military parachuting to the British military. In retirement, he served as the National Park Officer (equivalent to Chief executive) of Exmoor National Park.

== Early life ==
Wilson was born on 3 August 1919 in Burnopfield, County Durham, England. He was the eldest son of four children, two girls and two boys, born to Sydney Wilson. His father was the chairman of a coal company and an unsuccessful Conservative Party candidate for Parliament. He was educated at Shrewsbury School and St John's College, Cambridge to study economics. However, he did not complete his degree as his studies were interrupted by the outbreak of World War II.

== Military career ==
=== Second World War ===
At the outbreak of the Second World War, in September 1939, Wilson joined the British Army. He was commissioned into the Royal Northumberland Fusiliers on 29 November 1939 as a second lieutenant, with his service number being 96170. His first posting was as a scout car platoon commander. In March 1940, he was posted to France with the 8th (Motorcycle) Battalion of his regiment. He was involved in the unsuccessful fight against the German blitzkrieg and was evacuated from Dunkirk later that year . Based in the United Kingdom, he served as an instructor at the 3rd Division Battle School. On 14 January 1941, he transferred to the Reconnaissance Corps.

He attended the Middle East Staff College in Haifa in Palestine and then joined the Eighth Army as a staff officer. During August 1944, he was served as a liaison officer in Italy during the Italian Campaign. During this posting, and while reporting on enemy movement on the Gothic Line, he came into contact with General Sir Harold Alexander and Winston Churchill who had come up to survey the front.

In September 1944, he returned to regimental duties and was given command of a squadron in the 3rd (Royal Northumberland Fusiliers) Reconnaissance Regiment. He did not take part in the Normandy landings but was involved in the allied advance from Paris to the Rhine that followed. While holding the rank of war substantive captain, he was promoted to lieutenant on 17 January 1945 with seniority from 3 February 1942. This was later changed to seniority from 3 March 1941.

=== Post-WWII ===
In October 1945, he was posted to the Palestine and was appointed officer commanding a squadron of the 6th Airborne Armoured Reconnaissance Regiment. He was promoted to captain on 1 July 1946. He then worked in the headquarters of the 6th Airborne Division. Near the end of the British Mandate, he commanded a company of the 1st Battalion, Parachute Regiment. The Mandate ended in 1948 and he returned to the United Kingdom. He was then commissioned to write a history of 6th Airborne Division in Palestine from 1945 to 1948 which was published under the title Cordon and Search. After completing the book, he was posted to Germany where he once more commanded a company of the 1st Battalion, Parachute Regiment.

== Honours and decorations ==
On 19 April 1945, Wilson was awarded the Military Cross (MC) 'in recognition of gallant and distinguished services in North West Europe'. It was awarded for his actions while leading a patrol across the River Maas, near Nijmegen, Netherlands, on the night of 27 January 1945. They had been ordered to take an enemy soldier prisoner and bring him back across the river for interrogation. However, they found themselves under attack and outnumbered. Wilson led the defence and after an hour-long skirmish, they had defeated the enemy and taken three prisoners with no casualties on the Allied side.

He was mentioned in despatches on 14 February 1946 'in recognition of gallant and distinguished services in the field'. He was awarded a number of medals for service during World War II; the 1939–45 Star, the Italy Star, the France and Germany Star, the Defence Medal, and the War Medal 1939–1945.

On 7 January 1949, he was appointed Member of the Order of the British Empire (MBE) 'in recognition of gallant and distinguished services in Palestine during the period 27 March 1946 and 26 September 1946'. He was also awarded the General Service Medal with Palestine 1945–48 clasp.
