= SS Anne Reed =

A number of steamships have been named Anne Reed, including:

- SS Anne Reed (1932), a cargo ship in service 1946–49
- SS Anne Reed (1944), a Hansa A Type cargo ship in service 1950–56
