= Commonwealth Winter Games =

Former multi-sport event

The Commonwealth Winter Games was a multi-sport event comprising winter sports, last held in 1970. Four editions of the Games were staged. The Winter Games were designed as a counterbalance to the Commonwealth Games, which focuses on summer sports, to accompany the Winter Olympics and Summer Olympic Games.

== History ==
The Winter Games were founded by T.D. Richardson. The 1958 Commonwealth Winter Games were held in St. Moritz, Switzerland. This was the inaugural games for the winter edition. The 1962 Games were also held in St. Moritz, complementing the 1962 British Empire and Commonwealth Games in Perth, Australia, and the 1966 event was held in St. Moritz as well, following the 1970 games, the idea was discontinued.

A scheme for organising the games was drawn up at the Commonwealth Games Federation 1959, where it was decided these would be recognised as "associated games" and be held in Europe to increase the number of competitors and to reduce costs - with many of the lead skaters and skiers already taking part in the European championships at this time.

A Winter Games was proposed for 2010 in India, complementing the 2010 Commonwealth Games in New Delhi. The proposed venue was Gulmarg in Jammu and Kashmir, where the Indian National Winter Games had previously been held, but the idea did not come to fruition.

== List of Commonwealth Winter Games ==
| Edition | Year | Location |
|---|---|---|
| I | 1958 | St. Moritz, Switzerland |
| II | 1962 | St. Moritz, Switzerland |
| III | 1966 | St. Moritz, Switzerland |
| IV | 1970 | St. Moritz, Switzerland |

=== Participating Nations ===
Australia
Canada
England
Hong Kong
Malta
New Zealand
Nigeria
Northern Ireland
Nyasaland
Pakistan
Rhodesia
Scotland
Wales

== Overall Medal Table ==
Note: records kept from the time are sparse, with many planned events returning no result. The reported results are confirmed and validated. Where a partial result is returned, the medal table reflects confirmed medals but doesn't record any missing medals.

| Nations | Gold | Silver | Bronze |
|---|---|---|---|
| England | 20 | 19 | 20 |
| Canada | 10 | 6 | 6 |
| Scotland | 4 | 3 | 3 |
| New Zealand | 2 | 4 | 4 |
| Australia | 1 | 0 | 0 |
| Wales | 0 | 2 | 0 |
| Malta | 0 | 1 | 1 |
| NIR | 0 | 1 | 0 |
| Pakistan | 0 | 0 | 1 |
| | 37 | 38 | 35 |

== 1958 Commonwealth Winter Games ==
The games were first discussed at the Commonwealth Games Federation General Assembly on 2 December 1956. The games took place between 9 January 1958 to 19 January 1958.

| OC | Opening ceremony | ● | Event competitions | 1 | Event finals | CC | Closing ceremony |

| January 1958 | 09 Thu | 10 Fri | 11 Sat | 12 Sun | 13 Mon | 14 Tue | 15 Wed | 16 Thu | 17 Fri | 18 Sat | 19 Sun |
|---|---|---|---|---|---|---|---|---|---|---|---|
| Alpine Skiing | 3 | | | | | | | | | | |
| Bobsleigh | | | ● | 1 | | | | | | ● | 1 |
| Figure Skating | | | | | | | | 1 | 1 | | |
| Skeleton | ● | 1 | | | | | | | | | |
| Daily medal events | 3 | 1 | 0 | 0 | 0 | 0 | 0 | 1 | 1 | 0 | 1 |
| Cumulative total | 3 | 4 | 4 | 5 | 5 | 5 | 5 | 6 | 7 | 7 | 8 |
| January 1958 | 09 Thu | 10 Fri | 11 Sat | 12 Sun | 13 Mon | 14 Tue | 15 Wed | 16 Thu | 17 Fri | 18 Sat | 19 Sun |

| Sport | Event | Gold | Silver | Bronze |
|---|---|---|---|---|
| Alpine Skiing | Men's Downhill | (Canada) John Semmelink | (Canada) Shaun Fripp | (Canada) Jim Quarles |
| Alpine Skiing | Men's Slalom | (Canada) John Platt | (Canada) Arnold Midgley | (Canada) John Semmelink |
| Alpine Skiing | Men's Combined | (Canada) John Semmelink | (Canada) Arnold Midgley | (Canada) John Platt |
| Bobsleigh | 2 man | (England) Stuart Parkinson /Chris Williams | (Northern Ireland) Henry Taylor/Robin Dixon | (England) John Wodehouse/Mike Holliday |
| Bobsleigh | 4 man | (Scotland) Norman Barclay/Chris Skinner/Peter Forsdyke/R.Dickson | (England) Stuart Parkinson/Tony Nash/A.Dawes/Chris Williams | (Commonwealth of Nations) UNKNOWN |
| Figure Skating | Men's Singles | (Australia) Bill Cherrell | (England) David Clements | (Commonwealth of Nations) UNKNOWN |
| Figure Skating | Women's Singles | (England) Anne Reynolds | (England) Doreen Denny | (England) Mildred Atherley |
| Skeleton | Men's Singles | (England) Colin Mitchell | (England) Tony Claridge | (England) Dare Wilson |

== 1962 Commonwealth Winter Games ==
The games once again took place in St Moritz, to attract the maximum number of skaters and skiers from the European tour. The games took place between 16 January 1962 and 4 February 1962.

| OC | Opening ceremony | ● | Event competitions | 1 | Event finals | CC | Closing ceremony |

| January 1962 | 16 Tue | 17 Wed | 18 Thu | 19 Fri | 20 Sat | 21 Sun | 22 Mon | 23 Tue | 24 Wed | 25 Thu | 26 Fri | 27 Sat | 28 Sun | 29 Mon | 30 Tue | 31 Wed | 1 Thu | 2 Fri | 3 Sat | 4 Sun |
|---|---|---|---|---|---|---|---|---|---|---|---|---|---|---|---|---|---|---|---|---|
| Alpine Skiing | 3 | 5 | | | | | | | | | | | | | | | | | | |
| Bobsleigh | | | | | | | | | | | | | | | | | ● | 1 | ● | 1 |
| Cross Country | | | 1 | | | | | | | | | | | | | | | | | |
| Figure Skating | | | | | | | | | | | | | | | | 2 | | | | |
| Skeleton | | | | | | | | | | | | | | | | | | | ● | 1 |
| Daily medal events | 3 | 5 | 1 | 0 | 0 | 0 | 0 | 0 | 0 | 0 | 0 | 0 | 0 | 0 | 0 | 2 | 0 | 1 | 0 | 2 |
| Cumulative total | 3 | 8 | 9 | 9 | 9 | 9 | 9 | 9 | 9 | 9 | 9 | 9 | 9 | 9 | 9 | 11 | 11 | 12 | 12 | 14 |
| January 1962 | 16 Tue | 17 Wed | 18 Thu | 19 Fri | 20 Sat | 21 Sun | 22 Mon | 23 Tue | 24 Wed | 25 Thu | 26 Fri | 27 Sat | 28 Sun | 29 Mon | 30 Tue | 31 Wed | 1 Thu | 2 Fri | 3 Sat | 4 Sun |

| Sport | Event | Gold | Silver | Bronze |
|---|---|---|---|---|
| Alpine Skiing | Men's Downhill | (Canada) Lyn Cullis | (Canada) Renauld Argouin | (England) Richard Hampton |
| Alpine Skiing | Men's Team Downhill | (Canada) Lyn Cullis/Russell Legare | (England) Piers, Baron de Westenholz/Charles, Count de Westenholz/Richard Salm | (Scotland) Ian McCormick/J. Spencer/ UNKNOWN |
| Alpine Skiing | Men's Slalom | (Canada) Lyn Cullis | (Canada) Russell Legare | (England) Richard Hampton |
| Alpine Skiing | Men's Team Slalom | (England) Piers, Baron de Westenholz/Charles, Count de Westenholz/Richard Salm | (Commonwealth of Nations) UNKNOWN | (Commonwealth of Nations) UNKNOWN |
| Alpine Skiing | Men's Combined | (Canada) Lyn Cullis | (England) Richard Hampton | (Canada) Renauld Argouin |
| Alpine Skiing | Women's Downhill | (England) Anna Asheshov | (England) Gina Hathorn | (England) Tessa Dredge |
| Alpine Skiing | Women's Slalom | (England) Gina Hathorn | (England) Penelope Walker | (England) Diana Tomkinson |
| Alpine Skiing | Women's Combined | (England) Gina Hathorn | (England) Diana Tomkinson | (England) Penelope Walker |
| Bobsleigh | 2 man | (England) Tony Nash/Guy Renwick | (England) W.Walker/D.Willoughby | (England) David Evans/MS Boyle |
| Bobsleigh | 4 man | (Canada) Robin Seel/M. F. Gordon / P. Levesque / David Hobart | (England) Bill McCowen / Pat Martin / Rupert Lycett-Green / Andrew Hedges | (Canada) UNKNOWN |
| Cross Country | Men's 15K Classical | (England) John Moore | (England) John Dent | (England) Ralph Walker |
| Figure Skating | Men's Singles | (England) Malcolm Cannon | (Wales) Hywel Evans | (England) Alan Potter |
| Figure Skating | Women's Singles | (England) Jacqueline Harbord | (Scotland) Heather Moir | (England) Wendy Paton |
| Skeleton | Men's Singles | (England) Colin Mitchell | (Malta) Lesley Boyer | (Pakistan) Peter Fishbourne |

NOTE: Robin Seel was recorded as a member of a Canadian sled despite being a British bobsledder. The medal is counted as a Canadian gold.

== 1966 Commonwealth Winter Games ==
The third edition also took place in St Moritz. The games took place between 26 January 1966 and 11 February 1966.

| OC | Opening ceremony | ● | Event competitions | 1 | Event finals | CC | Closing ceremony |

| January 1966 | 26 Wed | 27 Thu | 28 Fri | 29 Sat | 30 Sun | 31 Mon | 1 Tue | 2 Wed | 3 Thu | 4 Fri | 5 Sat | 6 Sun | 7 Mon | 8 Tue | 9 Wed | 10 Thu | 11 Fri |
|---|---|---|---|---|---|---|---|---|---|---|---|---|---|---|---|---|---|
| Alpine Skiing | | | | 6 | | | | | | | | | | | | | |
| Bobsleigh | | | | | | | | | | | | | ● | 1 | ● | 1 | |
| Curling | ● | ● | 1 | | | | | | | | | | | | | | |
| Figure Skating | | | | | | | | | | | | | | | | | 2 |
| Skeleton | | | | | | | | | | | | 1 | | | | | |
| Daily medal events | 0 | 0 | 1 | 6 | 0 | 0 | 0 | 0 | 0 | 0 | 0 | 1 | 0 | 1 | 0 | 1 | 2 |
| Cumulative total | 0 | 0 | 1 | 7 | 7 | 7 | 7 | 7 | 7 | 7 | 7 | 8 | 8 | 9 | 9 | 10 | 12 |
| January 1962 | 26 Wed | 27 Thu | 28 Fri | 29 Sat | 30 Sun | 31 Mon | 1 Tue | 2 Wed | 3 Thu | 4 Fri | 5 Sat | 6 Sun | 7 Mon | 8 Tue | 9 Wed | 10 Thu | 11 Fri |

| Sport | Event | Gold | Silver | Bronze |
|---|---|---|---|---|
| Alpine Skiing | Men's Downhill | (England) David Freeth | (England) Peter Norman | (England) David Borradaile |
| Alpine Skiing | Men's Slalom | (England) Peter Norman | (New Zealand) Peter Goldstern | (England) Guy Whitley |
| Alpine Skiing | Men's Combined | (England) Peter Norman | (New Zealand) Peter Goldstern | (England) Guy Whitley |
| Alpine Skiing | Women's Downhill | (New Zealand) Anne Reid | (England) Mary Kerr | (New Zealand) Kathy Guy |
| Alpine Skiing | Women's Slalom | (England) Gina Hathorn | (New Zealand) Anne Reid | (New Zealand) Kathy Guy |
| Alpine Skiing | Women's Combined | (New Zealand) Anne Reid | (New Zealand) Kathy Guy | (New Zealand) Carol Lowry |
| Bobsleigh | 2 man | (England) Tony Nash/Guy Renwick | (Wales) John Lewis/Stephen Daniel | (Malta) John Blockey/Mike Freeman |
| Bobsleigh | 4 man | (Commonwealth of Nations) UNKNOWN | (Commonwealth of Nations) UNKNOWN | (Canada) UNKNOWN/John Blockey/Mike Freeman |
| Curling | Men's Team | (Canada) Wing Commander George Robertson, Joe Zedan, Ron Found and Scotty Miller | (England) Bill Black, Davie Kennedy, Jock Marr and Jim Adams | (England) Dan Kerr, Jim Kerr, Ron Thornton and Ken Duncan |
| Figure Skating | Men's Singles | (England) Harold Williams | (England) Michael Edmonds | (England) Alan Williamson |
| Figure Skating | Women's Singles | (England) Diana Clifton-Peach | (England) Sally-Anne Stapleford | (England) Patricia Dodd |
| Skeleton | Men's Singles | (England) Colin Mitchell | (England) Michael Thomson | (England) BAT Jennings |

NOTE: John Blockey and Mike Freeman are recorded as winning bronze in the 2-man for Malta, as they were based at RAF Luqa. They are also recorded as finishing in bronze position in the 4-man after joining a Canadian entry. They are recorded here as Malta in the 2-man and Canada in the 4-man.

== 1970 Commonwealth Winter Games ==
The 1970 games marked a vastly reduced and last-ditch Winter Games. With the passing of Tyke Richardson in January 1971, the games sadly lost momentum and faded out of consciousness.

The final edition took place between 21 December 1970 and 23 December 1970.

| OC | Opening ceremony | ● | Event competitions | 1 | Event finals | CC | Closing ceremony |

| December 1970 | 21 Mon | 22 Tue | 23 Wed |
|---|---|---|---|
| Alpine Skiing | 2 | | 2 |
| Daily medal events | 2 | 0 | 2 |
| Cumulative total | 2 | 0 | 4 |
| December 1970 | 21 Mon | 22 Tue | 23 Wed |

| Sport | Event | Gold | Silver | Bronze |
|---|---|---|---|---|
| Alpine Skiing | Men's Slalom | (Canada) Aidan Ballantyne | (Scotland) Royston Varley | (New Zealand) Chris Wormersley |
| Alpine Skiing | Men's Giant Slalom | (Scotland) Royston Varley | (Canada) Aidan Ballantyne | (Scotland) Iain Finlayson |
| Alpine Skiing | Women's Slalom | (Scotland) Carol Blackwood | (England) Antoinette Betts | (Scotland) Helen Carmichael |
| Alpine Skiing | Women's Giant Slalom | (Scotland) Carol Blackwood | (Scotland) Helen Jamieson | (England) Antoinette Betts |

== See also ==
- Commonwealth Youth Games
- Commonwealth Paraplegic Games
- Winter Olympic Games
- Asian Winter Games
