= Stuart Parkinson =

British alpine skier and bobsledder (1929–1989)

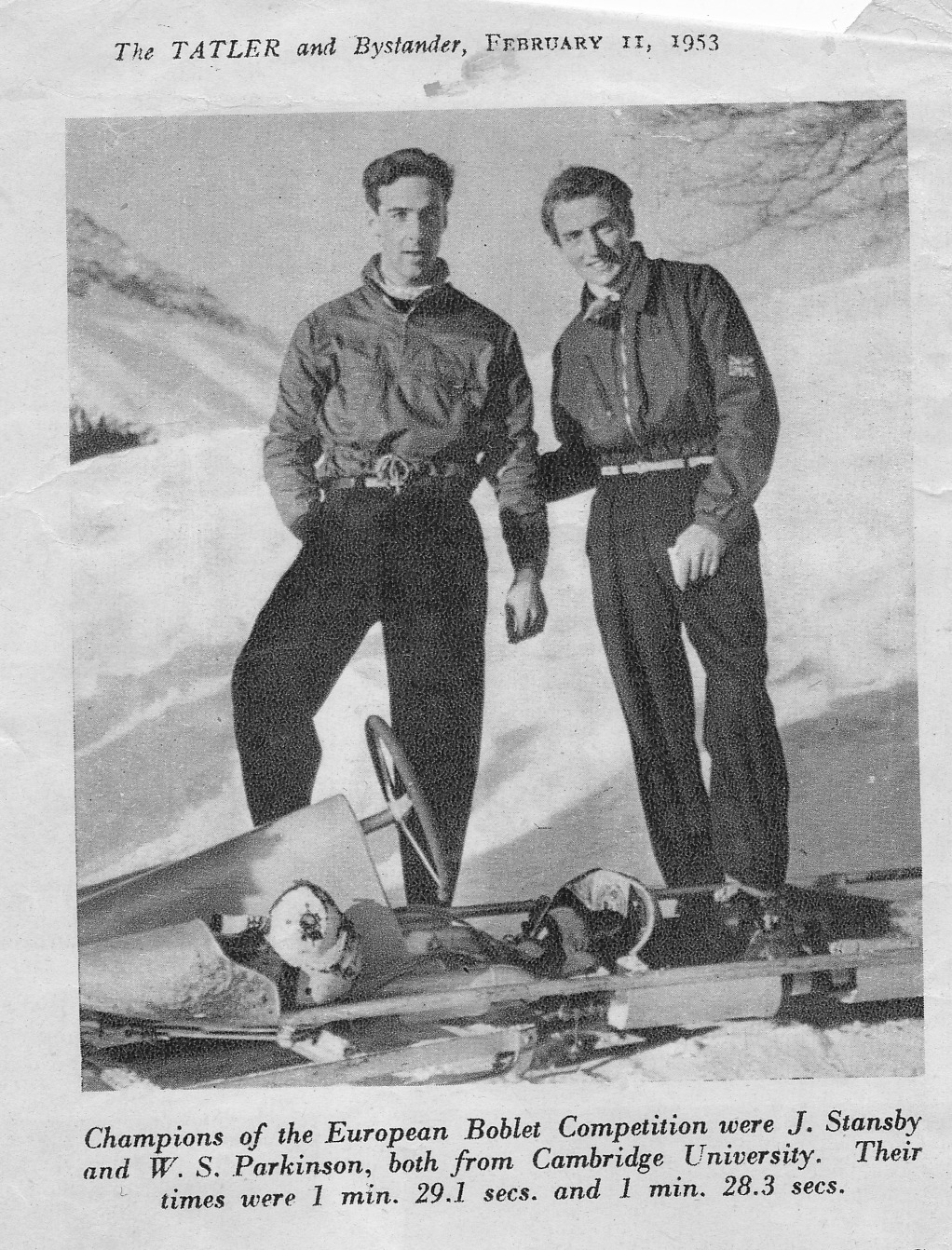
- Champions of the European Boblet Competition

Personal information
- Full name: Stuart William Parkinson
- Nationality: British
- Born: 31 May 1929 Hammersmith, London, England
- Died: 25 October 1989 (aged 60) London, England

Sport
- Sport: Alpine skiing
Medal record
Commonwealth Winter Games
| Gold medal – first place | 1958 St Moritz | 2 Man Bobsleigh |
| Silver medal – second place | 1958 St Moritz | 4 Man Bobsleigh |

Stuart Parkinson (31 May 1929 – 25 October 1989) was a British alpine skier and bobsledder. A former lieutenant in the Royal Engineers and 21 Special Air Service British army soldier, he competed in the men's downhill at the 1948 Winter Olympics and in the two-man and four-man bobsleigh events at the 1956 Winter Olympics. Parkinson was the flag bearer for Great Britain at Cortina during the 1956 Olympics. Along with his 1956 Olympic partner Christopher Williams, Parkinson won the first ever Commonwealth Winter Games 2-man bob title in 1958, representing England.
