= Josef Reisinger =

Austrian speed skater

Personal information
- Nationality: Austrian
- Born: 13 February 1940; Vienna, Austria
- Died: 26 April 2003 (aged 63)

Sport
- Sport: Speed skating

Josef Reisinger (13 February 1940 – 26 April 2003) was an Austrian speed skater. He competed in the men's 1500 metres event at the 1964 Winter Olympics.
