= World Skating Federation =

- Sport: Skating
- Abbreviation: WSF
- Founded: 2003
- Closure date: 2005

The World Skating Federation (WSF) was an effort in 2003 to replace the International Skating Union as the governing body for ice skating.

== History ==
The WSF was founded in the aftermath of the 2002 Winter Olympics figure skating scandal. Plans for the organization were announced in March 2003, and involved former ISU officials Sally-Anne Stapleford, Sonia Bianchetti, Ron Pfenning, and Britta Lindgren.

The group promised to judge in an unbiased manner by utilizing the 6.0 system, as well as by ensuring that ice skating judging panels are geographically balanced and held accountable.

Most of the group's members were noted to be from the United States, or work there. At the time plans for WSF were announced, the group had a planned budget of $1 million, but had only raised about $200,000. The money was mostly raised from individuals making small donations.

== Reception ==
At the time of the group's founding, it had received no support from any national skating federations, despite claims that the United States Figure Skating Association would support the WSF. The USFSA's executive committee later voted to endorse the WSF's principles, but not the group itself.

In addition, International Olympic Committee President Jacques Rogge declined to meet with the group or consider its platforms, saying the IOC only recognizes one federation per sport.

ISU officials condemned efforts at creating the WSF and criticized its members, saying they did nothing to produce judging reforms during their time with the ISU.

Criticisms of WSF members, similar to those voiced by the ISU, were echoed by those outside of the ISU, but the group did receive positive comments from at least one commentator, who said its members were echoing sentiments that are well known for some time.

=== Response by ISU ===
ISU officials threatened to punish federations or individuals who supported the breakaway group. Hungarian judge Judit Furst-Tombor was dropped from the judging panel at a competition, a day after she joined the press conference announcing the WSF's founding. Some national federations, including Skate Canada, threatened to expel members if they supported the WSF.

In response, WSF officials filed a lawsuit against the ISU in December 2003, citing anti-competitive behavior. The lawsuit was dismissed in February 2005. Shortly thereafter, Pfenning, at the time the group's acting president, announced that the group would be dissolved.

Eventually, the ISU decided that Furst-Tombor, along with Stapleford, Pfenning, Lindgren, Jon Jackson and Jan Garden, were excluded from the group.
