= Mike Freeman (bobsleigh) =

British bobsledder (1937–2007)

Personal information
- Full name: Roy Edward Michael Freeman
- Nationality: British
- Born: 30 July 1937 London, England
- Died: 26 August 2007 (aged 70)

Sport
- Sport: Bobsleigh
Medal record
Men's bobsleigh
Representing Great Britain
European Championships
Bronze medal – third place	1968 St. Moritz	Two-man
Bronze medal – third place	1968 St. Moritz	Four-man
Commonwealth Winter Games
Bronze medal – third place	1966 St Moritz	Two-man
Bronze medal – third place	1966 St Moritz	Four-man

Roy Edward Michael "Mike" Freeman (30 July 1937 – 26 August 2007) was a British bobsledder. He competed at the 1968 Winter Olympics and the 1972 Winter Olympics.
