= David Borradaile =

British alpine skier (born 1945)

Skiing career
- Sport: Alpine skiing
Medal record
Commonwealth Winter Games
Bronze medal – third place	1966 St Moritz	Men's Downhill

David Borradaile (born 16 September 1945) is a British former alpine skier who competed in the 1968 Winter Olympics.
