= John Blockey =

British bobsledder (born 1937)

Personal information
- Full name: John William Blockey
- Nationality: British
- Born: 2 April 1937 (age 89) Hindhead, England

Sport
- Sport: Bobsleigh
Medal record
Men's bobsleigh
Representing Great Britain
European Championships
| Bronze medal – third place | 1968 St. Moritz | Two-man |
| Bronze medal – third place | 1968 St. Moritz | Four-man |
Commonwealth Winter Games
| Bronze medal – third place | 1966 St Moritz | Two-man |
| Bronze medal – third place | 1966 St Moritz | Four-man |

John William Blockey (born 2 April 1937) is a British bobsledder. He competed in the two-man and the four-man events at the 1968 Winter Olympics.
