= Sally-Anne Stapleford =

British figure skater and administrator (born 1945)

Personal information
- Full name: Sally-Anne Martine Stapleford
- Born: 7 July 1945 (age 81) Worthing, Sussex, England
- Height: 5 ft 3.5 in (161 cm)

Figure skating career
- Country: Great Britain
- Retired: 1968
Medal record
Representing Great Britain
Ladies' Figure skating
European Championships
Silver medal – second place	1965 Moscow	Ladies' singles
Commonwealth Winter Games
Silver medal – second place	1966 St Moritz	Figure Skating - Women's Singles

Sally-Anne Martine Stapleford OBE (born 7 July 1945) is a British former figure skater and administrator, referee and judge. She is the 1965 European silver medalist. She represented Great Britain at the 1964 Winter Olympics and at the 1968 Winter Olympics, placing 11th both times.

== Biography ==
=== Personal life ===
Her father was the ice hockey player Harvey Stapleford. Her mother was the daughter of the comedian Charlie Naughton.

=== Competitive career ===
Stapleford is a five-time British champion in figure skating in the ladies event and won the silver medal at the 1965 European Figure Skating Championships.

=== Post-competitive career ===
After her figure skating career, in 1972 she was appointed a referee at International Skating Union (ISU) events for single and pair skating. Between 1988 and 2002 she was a member of the ISU figure skating technical committee, including serving as chair of this committee from 1992 to 2002. Since 1995, she has also been the president of the National Ice Skating Association of the United Kingdom (NISA), the British figure skating federation.

Stapleford was involved in the 2002 Olympic Winter Games figure skating scandal, the person to whom Marie-Reine Le Gougne ("the French judge") confessed following the event to having been involved in a political deal in the pairs competition. Stapleford lost her ISU technical committee position later that year for unprofessional behaviour. Subsequently, Stapleford became one of the founders of the World Skating Federation (WSF), and spoke at their press conference on 23 March 2003. The WSF ultimately failed to supplant the ISU, and as a result of her involvement with the attempt, Stapleford lost her ISU eligibility on 1 February 2005. Stapleford has continued to be a vocal critic of the ISU Judging System and the ISU's post-2002 policy of not identifying marks by judge, which she has alleged could simply hide further instances of judging corruption or incompetence.

== Competitive highlights ==
Event	1963	1964	1965	1966	1967	1968
Winter Olympics		11th				11th
World Championships		8th		13th	6th	
European Championships	5th	4th	2nd	7th	4th	5th
British Championships	3rd	1st	1st	1st	1st	1st
