= Diana Tomkinson =

British alpine skier (1943–2023)

Medal record
Commonwealth Winter Games
Bronze medal – third place	1962 St Moritz	Woman's Downhill
Silver medal – second place	1962 St Moritz	Women's Combined

Diana Tomkinson (23 April 1943 – 30 January 2023) was a British alpine skier who competed in the 1968 Winter Olympics. Tomkinson was born in London on 23 April 1943, and died on 30 January 2023, at the age of 79.
