= David E. Hobart =

American nuclear chemist

- Education: Rollins College; University of Tennessee (PhD)
- Awards: Fellow of the American Chemical Society (2013); W. Frank Kinard Distinguished Service Award (2019)
- Scientific career
- Fields: Nuclear chemistry Actinide chemistry
- Workplaces: Florida State University; Los Alamos National Laboratory; Lawrence Berkeley National Laboratory

David Edward Hobart is an American nuclear and heavy element chemist. He worked at Los Alamos National Laboratory, where he was principal investigator for the Solubility and Speciation Task of the Yucca Mountain Project.

Hobart's research has included the higher oxidation states of the lanthanide and actinide elements, the Raman spectroscopy of actinyl ions, plutonium colloids and the chemistry of berkelium. He was named a Fellow of the American Chemical Society in 2013 and received the W. Frank Kinard Distinguished Service Award from its Division of Nuclear Chemistry and Technology in 2019.

== Education and career ==
After graduating from Rollins College in Winter Park, Florida, Hobart served in the United States Air Force as an electronic maintenance specialist on the SR-71 Blackbird. At Beale Air Force Base, California, he was a sensor systems repairman. He received a PhD in chemistry from the University of Tennessee.

At Los Alamos National Laboratory, Hobart was principal investigator for the Solubility and Speciation Task of the Yucca Mountain Project. In 1993 he became leader of the Actinide Geochemistry Group at Lawrence Berkeley National Laboratory, and in 1996 he joined the engineering firm RE/SPEC as a technical consultant to the Department of Energy's Waste Isolation Pilot Plant project. He returned to Los Alamos in 1999 and had retired by 2013. By 2020 he was a research professor at Florida State University.

Hobart chaired the executive committee of the 1993 International Conference on Actinides in Santa Fe, and in 2015 he chaired the American Chemical Society (ACS) Division of Nuclear Chemistry and Technology.

== Research ==
Hobart, K. Samhoun and others studied mendelevium electrochemically and concluded that a 1972 claim by N. B. Mikheev and co-workers of a stable monovalent mendelevium ion was unsubstantiated. In 1980 Hobart and Joseph R. Peterson reported spectroscopic evidence for tetravalent praseodymium and terbium in alkaline carbonate solution. They also generated americium(IV) electrochemically in aqueous carbonate solution and reported its spectrum. From measurements in carbonate solutions, Hobart, Samhoun and Peterson obtained a standard reduction potential for the americium(IV)/americium(III) couple that was included in the OECD Nuclear Energy Agency's review Chemical Thermodynamics of Americium.

In 1983 Hobart and his colleagues reported the Raman spectra of actinyl(V) and actinyl(VI) ions in perchlorate and carbonate solutions and of solid sodium actinide(V) double carbonates. A year later, they used Raman spectroscopy to examine the hydrolysis of neptunium(VI) and plutonium(VI) in aqueous solution and assigned bands in the spectra to dimeric hydroxo complexes of both ions. Hobart photographed aqueous solutions of uranium, neptunium and plutonium in different oxidation states. With P. D. Palmer, he prepared solutions of plutonium in different oxidation states.

Hobart, T. W. Newton and Palmer observed in 1986 that auto-radiolysis of plutonium(VI) solutions formed intrinsic plutonium(IV) colloids. He and his colleagues examined the sorption of neptunium(V) on goethite by EXAFS spectroscopy in 1992 and suggested that neptunium(V) sorbs at the interface between goethite and water as an inner-sphere complex.

Hobart and Peterson wrote the chapter on the chemistry of berkelium in volume 28 of Advances in Inorganic Chemistry and Radiochemistry, published in 1984. He also served on the editorial board of the second edition of the American Nuclear Society's Plutonium Handbook and co-wrote two of its chapters.

== Awards ==
- Fellow, American Chemical Society (2013)
- W. Frank Kinard Distinguished Service Award, ACS Division of Nuclear Chemistry and Technology (2019)

== Selected publications ==
- Madic, C.; Begun, G. M.; Hobart, D. E.; Hahn, R. L. (1984). "Raman spectroscopy of neptunyl and plutonyl ions in aqueous solution: hydrolysis of neptunium(VI) and plutonium(VI) and disproportionation of plutonium(V)". Inorganic Chemistry. 23 (13): 1914–1921. doi:10.1021/ic00181a025.
- Combes, J. M.; Chisholm-Brause, C. J.; Brown, G. E. Jr.; Parks, G. A.; Conradson, S. D.; Eller, P. G.; Triay, I. R.; Hobart, D. E.; Meijer, A. (1992). "EXAFS spectroscopic study of neptunium(V) sorption at the α-iron hydroxide oxide (α-FeOOH)/water interface". Environmental Science & Technology. 26 (2): 376–382. doi:10.1021/es00026a020.
- Clark, D. L.; Hobart, D. E.; Neu, M. P. (1995). "Actinide Carbonate Complexes and Their Importance in Actinide Environmental Chemistry". Chemical Reviews. 95 (1): 25–48. doi:10.1021/cr00033a002.
- Seaborg, G. T.; Hobart, D. E. (1996). "Summary of the Properties of the Lanthanide and Actinide Elements". In Sood, D. D.; Reddy, A. V. R.; Pujari, P. K. (eds.). Frontiers in Nuclear Chemistry: Commemorating the Centennial of the Discovery of Radioactivity. Mumbai: Indian Association of Nuclear Chemists and Allied Scientists. pp. 69–94.
- Hobart, D. E.; Peterson, J. R. (2006). "Berkelium". In Morss, L. R.; Edelstein, N. M.; Fuger, J. (eds.). The Chemistry of the Actinide and Transactinide Elements (3rd ed.). Dordrecht: Springer. pp. 1444–1498. doi:10.1007/1-4020-3598-5_10. ISBN 978-1-4020-3555-5.
