= Erkki Koiso =

Finnish ice hockey player

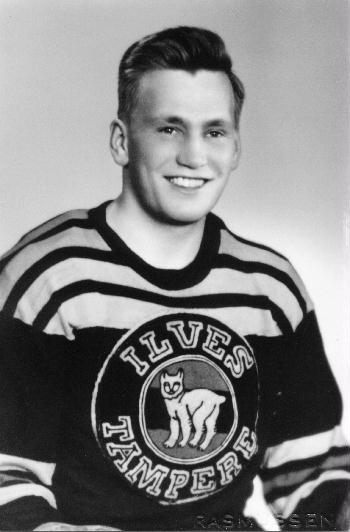
Erkki Koiso

Erkki Antero Koiso (April 13, 1934 in Tampere, Finland – July 9, 2000) was a professional ice hockey player who played in the SM-liiga. He played for Ilves. Koiso was a member of the 1960 Finnish Olympic ice hockey team. He was inducted into the Finnish Hockey Hall of Fame in 1985.
