= Robin Seel =

British bobsledder

Personal information
- Nationality: British
- Born: 29 February 1940 (age 86) London, England

Sport
- Sport: Bobsleigh
Medal record
Commonwealth Winter Games
Gold medal – first place	1962 St Moritz	4 Man Bobsleigh

Robin Seel (born 20 February 1940) is a British bobsledder. He competed in the four-man event at the 1964 Winter Olympics.
