= Toimi Alatalo =

Finnish cross-country skier (1929–2014)

Medal record

Men's cross-country skiing

Representing Finland

Olympic Games
Gold medal – first place	1960 Squaw Valley	4 × 10 km relay

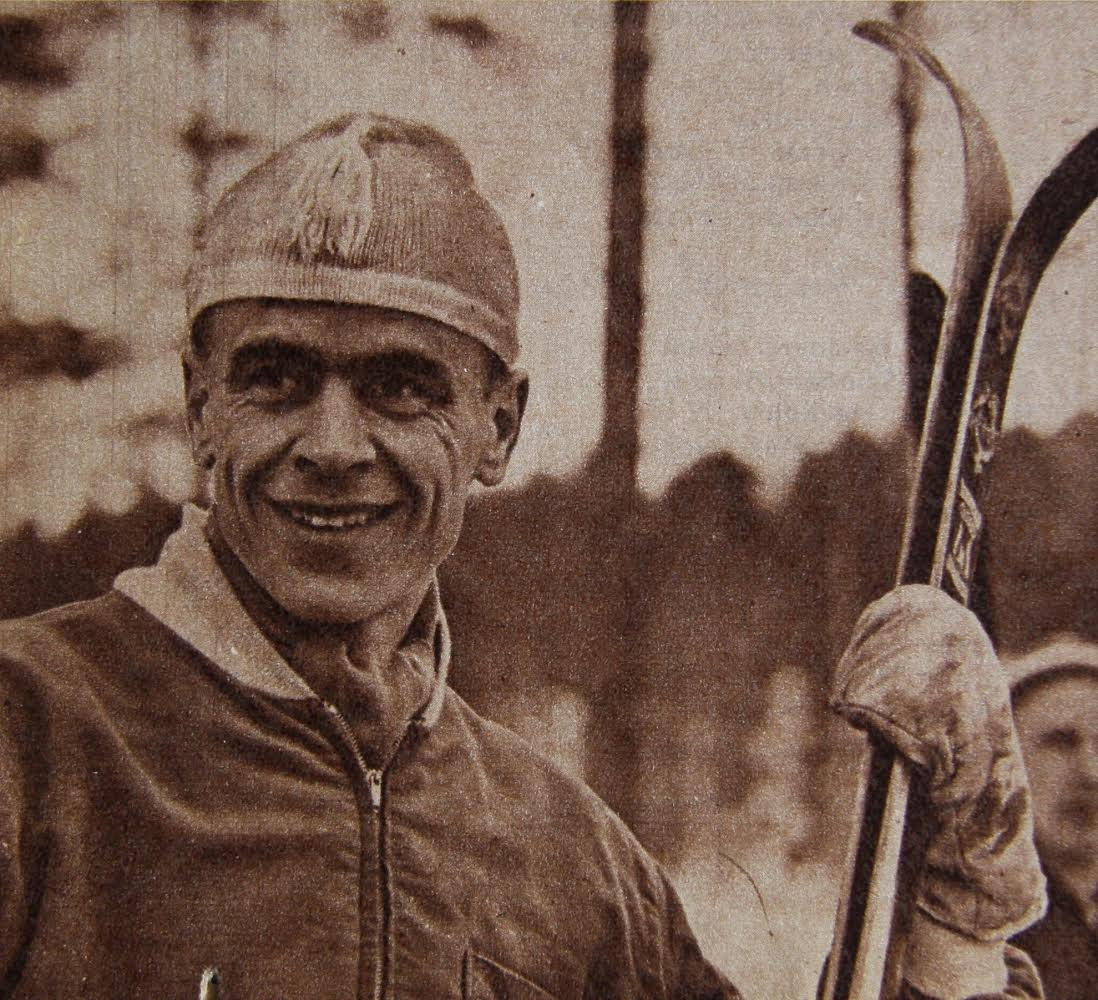
Toimi Alatalo

Toimi Alatalo (4 April 1929 – 28 April 2014) was a Finnish cross-country skier who competed in the late 1950s and early 1960s. He won a gold medal at the 1960 Winter Olympics in Squaw Valley in the 4 × 10 km relay.

== Cross-country skiing results ==
=== Olympic Games ===
- 1 medal – (1 gold)

Year	Age	15 km	30 km	50 km	4 × 10 km relay
1960	30	23	7	—	Gold
