= John Dent (biathlete) =

British biathlete (born 1938)

Personal information
- Nationality: British
- Born: 15 February 1938 (age 88)

Sport
- Sport: Biathlon, cross-country skiing
Medal record
Commonwealth Winter Games
Silver medal – second place	1962 St Moritz	Cross Country - Men's 15K Classical

John Dent (born 15 February 1938) is a British biathlete. He competed in the 20 km individual event at the 1964 Winter Olympics.
