= David Rees (British cross-country skier) =

British cross-country skier (born 1940)

Personal information
- Nationality: British
- Born: 29 December 1940 (age 85) Ammanford, Wales

Sport
- Sport: Cross-country skiing

David Rees (born 29 December 1940) is a British cross-country skier. He competed in the men's 15 kilometre event at the 1964 Winter Olympics.
