= Roderick Tuck =

British biathlete (1934–2006)

Personal information
- Nationality: British
- Born: 28 May 1934; Portsmouth, England
- Died: 10 May 2006 (aged 71); West Sussex, England

Sport
- Sport: Biathlon, cross-country skiing (sport)

Roderick Tuck (28 May 1934 – 10 May 2006) was a British skier. He competed in the biathlon and the cross-country skiing at the 1964 Winter Olympics.
