= Pekka Ristola =

Finnish Nordic combined skier

Pekka Ristola (13 May 1929 – 1 August 2008) was a Finnish Nordic combined skier who competed in the 1960s. He finished fourth in the Nordic combined event at the 1960 Winter Olympics in Squaw Valley. Ristola was born in Iitti.
