= Guy Renwick =

British bobsledder

Personal information
- Nationality: British
- Born: 5 November 1936 Hampstead, England
- Died: 30 January 2010 (aged 73)

Sport
- Sport: Bobsleigh
Medal record
Commonwealth Winter Games
| Gold medal – first place | 1962 St Moritz | 2 Man Bobsleigh |
| Gold medal – first place | 1966 St Moritz | 2 Man Bobsleigh |

Guy Renwick (5 November 1936 – 30 January 2010) was a British bobsledder. He competed at the 1964 Winter Olympics and the 1968 Winter Olympics.
