= David Hobart (bobsleigh) =

Canadian bobsledder

Personal information
- Nationality: Canadian
- Born: 5 February 1936 (age 90)

Sport
- Sport: Bobsleigh
Medal record
Commonwealth Winter Games
Gold medal – first place	1962 St Moritz	4 Man Bobsleigh

David Hobart (born 5 February 1936) is a Canadian bobsledder. He competed in the four-man event at the 1964 Winter Olympics.
