= Anne Reid (skier) =

New Zealand alpine skier (born 1945)

Medal record
Commonwealth Winter Games
| Gold medal – first place | 1966 St Moritz | Women's Downhill |
| Gold medal – first place | 1966 St Moritz | Women's Combined |
| Silver medal – second place | 1966 St Moritz | Women's Slalom |

Anne Reid later Anne Reid Picher (born 1945) is an alpine skier from New Zealand.

In the 1968 Winter Olympics at Grenoble, she came 37th in the Downhill, 30th in the Slalom and 42nd in the Giant Slalom.
