= Iris Sihvonen =

Finnish speed skater

Personal information
- Born: April 22, 1940 (age 86) Liperi
- Died: 29 May 2010 (aged 70)
- Height: 1.63 m (5 ft 4 in)
- Weight: 54.8 kg (121 lb; 8.63 st)

Sport
- Country: Finland
- Sport: Speed skating
Medal record
Representing Finland
Women's speed skating
Olympic Games
World Championships

Iris Hellin Sihvonen (née Jokinen; 22 April 1940 – 29 May 2010) was a Finnish speed skater. She represented Finland at the Olympic Winter Games of 1960 in Squaw Valley, Placer County, California and made seven consecutive appearances at the World Allround Speed Skating Championships for Women between 1955 and 1961. She became Finnish champion in 1956 and 1961 and skated at first with Valkeakosken Haka and later with Valkeakosken Koskenpojat.

== Personal records ==
Personal records
Distance	Time	Place	Date
500 m	48.1	Squaw Valley	20-02-1960
1,000 m	1:37.3	Squaw Valley	22-02-1960
1,500 m	2:29.7	Squaw Valley	21-02-1960
3,000 m	5:35.2	Squaw Valley	23-02-1960
5,000 m	11.55.2	Valkeakoski	05-02-1955
Mini combination	209.616	Sverdlovsk (Yekatrinburg)	28-02/01-03-1959

Awards
Preceded by (Finland) Siiri Rantanen	Finnish Sportswoman of the Year; 1957	Succeeded by (Finland) Siiri Rantanen
