= Anna Asheshov =

British alpine skier (1941–2026)

Personal information
- Full name: Anna Margaret Clark Asheshov
- Nationality: British
- Born: 8 July 1941 London, Ontario, Canada
- Died: 10 March 2026 (aged 84) West Bagborough, England

Sport
- Sport: Alpine skiing
Medal record
Commonwealth Winter Games
Gold medal – first place	1962 St Moritz	Women's Downhill

Anna Margaret Clark Asheshov (8 July 1941 – 10 March 2026) was a British alpine skier. She competed in the women's downhill at the 1964 Winter Olympics. Asheshov died in West Bagborough, England on 10 March 2026, at the age of 84.
