= Tania Heald =

British alpine skier (born 1943)

Personal information
- Nationality: British
- Born: 28 May 1943 (age 81); Virginia Water, Surrey, England

Sport
- Sport: Alpine skiing

Tania Heald (born 28 May 1943) is a British alpine skier. She competed in two events at the 1964 Winter Olympics.
