= Leo Tynkkynen =

Finnish speed skater (1934–1971)

Personal information
- Nationality: Finnish
- Born: 6 November 1934; Lappeenranta, Finland
- Died: 11 February 1971 (aged 36); Lappeenranta, Finland

Sport
- Sport: Speed skating

Leo Tynkkynen (6 November 1934 – 11 February 1971) was a Finnish speed skater. He competed at the 1956 Winter Olympics and the 1960 Winter Olympics.
