= Jouko Jokinen =

Finnish speed skater (1936–2024)

Personal information
- Nationality: Finnish
- Born: 30 November 1936 Rovaniemi, Finland
- Died: 22 September 2024 (aged 87)

Sport
- Sport: Speed skating

Jouko Jokinen (30 November 1936 – 22 September 2024) was a Finnish speed skater. He competed at the 1960 Winter Olympics and the 1964 Winter Olympics.
