= Eevi Huttunen =

Finnish speed skater

Personal information
- Born: 23 August 1922 Karttula, Finland
- Died: 3 December 2015 (aged 93)
- Height: 1.60 m (5 ft 3 in)
- Weight: 55.8 kg (123 lb; 8.79 st)

Sport
- Country: Finland
- Sport: Speed skating
Medal record
Representing Finland
Women's speed skating
Olympic Games
Bronze medal – third place	1960 Squaw Valley	3000 m
World Championships
Gold medal – first place	1951 Eskilstuna	Allround
Gold medal – first place	1951 Eskilstuna	3000 m
Gold medal – first place	1951 Eskilstuna	1000 m
Gold medal – first place	1951 Eskilstuna	5000 m
Gold medal – first place	1953 Lillehammer	5000 m
Gold medal – first place	1954 Ōstersund	5000 m
Gold medal – first place	1957 Imatra	3000 m
Gold medal – first place	1959 Sverdlovsk	3000 m
Silver medal – second place	1948 Turku	5000 m
Silver medal – second place	1951 Eskilstuna	500 m
Silver medal – second place	1952 Kokkola	5000 m
Silver medal – second place	1955 Kuopio	3000 m
Silver medal – second place	1955 Kuopio	5000 m
Bronze medal – third place	1948 Turku	3000 m
Bronze medal – third place	1952 Kokkola	3000 m
Bronze medal – third place	1953 Lillehammer	3000 m
Bronze medal – third place	1960 Ōstersund	3000 m

Eevi Huttunen (married name Pirinen; 23 August 1922 – 3 December 2015), was a speed skater from Finland. She was born in Karttula.

For a decade she was almost the only female skater able to compete against the Soviet ladies on the longer distances, Huttunen made a comeback specially for the 1960 Winter Olympics (the first where women speed skaters were allowed to compete), where she won the bronze on the 3000 m. She competed in eleven World Allround Championships which was till 1960 the only international speed skating event for women, from 1948 to 1960 (every year except 1956 and 1958), winning the 1951 event and being on many occasions the best non-soviet skater, certainly in the longer distances.

== Medals ==
An overview of medals won by Huttunen at important championships she participated in, listing the years in which she won each:

Data from
Championships
Gold medal	Silver medal	Bronze medal
World Allround	1951	
Finnish Allround	1946; 1947; 1948; 1950; 1951; 1952; 1953; 1954; 1955; 1957; 1959; 1960	1941; 1943; 1944; 1945; 1949

== Personal records ==
Personal records
Distance	Time	Place	Date
500 m	48.2	Pieksämäki	8 Mar 1957
1,000 m	1:37.2	Squaw Valley	22 Feb 1960
1,500 m	2:35.1	Squaw Valley	21 Feb 1960
3,000 m	5:18.8	Pieksämäki	8 Mar 1957
5,000 m	9:06.1	Lillehammer	22 Feb 1953
Mini combination	209.000	Sverdlovsk	28 Feb/1 Mar 1959
Old combination	210.293	Lillehammer	21/22 Feb 1953

Best times in Finland
Distance	Time	Place	Date
500 m	48.2	Pieksämäki	8 Mar 1957
1,000 m	1:41.8	Imatra	10 Feb 1957
1,500 m	2:39.6	Rovaniemi	17 Mar 1957
3,000 m	5:18.8	Pieksämäki	8 Mar 1957
5,000 m	9:28.9	Rovaniemi	20 Mar 1954
Mini combination	210.333	Rovaniemi	16/17 Mar 1957
Old combination	216.177	Kuopio	12/13 Feb 1955
