= Thomas Dawson (speed skater) =

British speed skater

Personal information
- Full name: Thomas Bryce Dawson
- Nationality: British
- Born: 15 February 1942 (age 83); Falkirk, Scotland
- Height: 168 cm (5 ft 6 in)

Sport
- Sport: Speed skating

Thomas Bryce Dawson (born 15 February 1942) is a British speed skater. He competed in two events at the 1964 Winter Olympics.
