= Keijo Tapiovaara =

Finnish speed skater

Personal information
- Nationality: Finnish
- Born: 18 May 1939 (age 85); Tampere, Finland

Sport
- Sport: Speed skating

Keijo Tapiovaara (born 18 May 1939) is a Finnish speed skater. He competed in three events at the 1960 Winter Olympics.
