= Juhani Järvinen =

Finnish speed skater

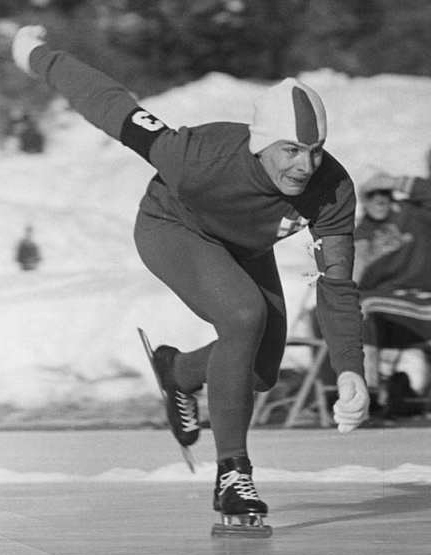
- Järvinen in 1959

Personal information
- Born: 9 May 1935 Tuulos, Finland
- Died: 31 May 1984 (aged 49) Helsinki, Finland
- Height: 172 cm (5 ft 8 in)
- Weight: 72 kg (159 lb)

Sport
- Sport: Speed skating
- Club: HTL, Helsinki

Achievements and titles
- Personal best(s): 500 m – 41.2 (1959); 1500 m – 2:06.3 (1959); 5000 m – 8:04.4 (1964); 10000 m – 16:35.4 (1960)
Medal record
Representing Finland
World Championships
| Gold medal – first place | 1959 Oslo | Allround |
European Speed Skating Championships
| Silver medal – second place | 1959 Gothenburg | Allround |

Jouko Juhani Järvinen (9 May 1935 – 31 May 1984) was a Finnish speed skater. He competed in the 1956, 1960 and 1964 Olympics with the best result of fourth place over 1500 m in 1956 and fifth in 1960. In 1959 he won a world title, placing second at the European championships. The same year he set a world record over 1500 m (2:06.3) and was elected Finnish Sportspersonality of the year. His world record stood for seven years.

Järvinen stayed on top of the Adelskalender ranking table during two periods in 1959 and 1960. His son Timo also became an Olympic speed skater.

| Discipline | Time | Date | Location |
|---|---|---|---|
| 1500 m | 2.06,3 | 1 March 1959 | (United States) Squaw Valley |

Source: SpeedSkatingStats.com
