= Tony Bullen =

British speed skater (1931–2014)

Personal information
- Full name: Anthony Francis Bullen
- Nationality: British
- Born: 2 August 1931 Nottingham, England
- Died: 9 December 2014 (aged 83)
- Height: 180 cm (5 ft 11 in)

Sport
- Sport: Speed skating
- Club: Nottingham Ice Skating Club

Anthony Francis "Tony" Bullen (2 August 1931 – 9 December 2014) was a British speed skater. He competed in three events at the 1964 Winter Olympics.
