= Terry Malkin =

British speed skater (1935–2010)

Personal information
- Full name: Thomas Alfred Terence Malkin
- Nationality: British
- Born: 20 September 1935 Tadcaster, England
- Died: 18 March 2010 (aged 74) Vestby, Norway

Sport
- Sport: Speed skating

Thomas Alfred Terence Malkin (20 September 1935 – 18 March 2010) was a British speed skater. He competed at the 1960 Winter Olympics and the 1964 Winter Olympics. Malkin died in Vestby on 18 March 2010, at the age of 74.
