= SS Pagenturm (Deutsche Werft, 1944) =

Cargo ship (1944–1964)

History
- Name: Schauenberg (1944-45); Empire Galway (1945-46); Kinshasa (1946-50); Anne Reed (1950-56); Pagenturm (1956-64)
- Owner: Harald Schuldt & Co (1944-45); Ministry of War Transport (1945-46); Ministry of Marine, Belgian Government (1946-51); D/S A/S Ibis (1951-56); Deutsche Dampfschifffarts-Gesellschaft Hansa (1956-64)
- Operator: Harald Schuldt & Co (1944-45); Walford Lines Ltd (1945-46); Compagnie Maritime Belge Lloyd (1946-49); Compagnie Maritime Congolaise (1949-51); Johs Larsen (1951-56); Deutsche Dampfschifffarts-Gesellschaft Hansa (1956-64)
- Port of registry: (Nazi Germany) Flensburg, Germany (1943-45); London, United Kingdom (1945-46); Antwerp, Belgium (1946-51); Bergen, Norway (1951-56); Bremen, West Germany (1956-64)
- Builder: Deutsche Werft
- Yard number: 446
- Laid down: 15 February 1944
- Launched: 20 June 1944
- Completed: 29 September 1944
- Out of service: 1964
- Identification: Code Letters DKLM (1944-45); United Kingdom Official Number 180772 (1945-46); Code Letters GKWR (1945-46); Code Letters ONKI (1956-51); Code Letters LIVN (51-56); Code Letters DLCY (1956-64); IMO number: 5526869 ( –1964)
- Fate: Scrapped

General characteristics
- Class & type: Hansa A type Cargo ship
- Tonnage: 1,944 GRT, 965 NRT, 3,100 DWT (1944-56); 1,942 GRT, 964 NRT, 3,800 DWT (1956-64)
- Length: 85.29 m (279 ft 10 in)
- Beam: 13.49 m (44 ft 3 in)
- Draught: 8.20 m (26 ft 11 in)
- Depth: 4.78 m (15 ft 8 in)
- Installed power: Compound steam engine, 1,200IHP
- Propulsion: Single screw propeller
- Speed: 10.5 knots (19.4 km/h)
- Crew: 35

Pagenturm was a Hansa A Type cargo ship which was built as Schauenberg in 1944 by Deutsche Werft, Hamburg, Germany for H Schuldt, Hamburg. She was seized as a prize of war in 1945, passing to the Ministry of War Transport and renamed Empire Galway. She was allocated to Belgium in 1946 and was renamed Kinshasha. She was sold to Norway in 1951 and renamed Anne Reed. Sold to West Germany in 1956, she was rebuilt and renamed Pagenturm. She served until 1964, when she was scrapped.

== Description ==
The ship was 85.19 m (279 ft 6 in) long, with a beam of 13.49 m (44 ft 3 in). She had a depth of 4.78 m (15 ft 8 in), and a draught of 8.20 m (26 ft 11 in). She was assessed as 1,944 GRT, 965 NRT, 3,100 DWT.

The ship was propelled by a compound steam engine, which had two cylinders of 44 cm (17 1/2 inches) and two cylinders of 94 cm (37 inches) diameter by 91 cm (36 inches) stroke, The engine was built by Deutsche Werft. Rated at 1,200IHP, it drove a single screw propeller and could propel the ship at 10.5 knots (19.4 km/h).

The ship had a complement of 35. She was equipped with 1×20-tonne, 1×10-tonne and 9×5-tonne cranes.

== History ==
Schauenberg was a Hansa A Type cargo ship built in 1945 as yard number 446 by Deutsche Werft, Hamburg, Germany for Harald Schuldt & Co, Flensburg, Germany. Her keel was laid on 15 February, She was launched on 20 June and completed on 28 September. Her port of registry was Flensburg, and the Code Letters DKLM were allocated.

On 14 December 1944, Schauenberg was severely damaged in an Allied air raid on Libau. In March 1945, she took part in the Evacuation of East Prussia. On 8 May 1945, Schauenberg was seized as a prize of war at Flensburg, Germany. She was delivered to Methil, Fife on 15 July. She was passed to the Ministry of War Transport and was renamed Empire Galway. The Code Letters GKWR and United Kingdom Official Number 180772 were allocated. Her port of registry was London and she was operated under the management of Walford Line Ltd.

On 6 August 1946, Empire Galway was allocated to Belgium and was renamed Kinshasha. She was owned by the Ministry of Marine, part of the Belgian Government. She was placed under the management of the Compagnie Maritime Belge Lloyd. Her port of registry was Antwerp, and the Code Letters ONKI were allocated. In 1949, management was transferred to the Compagnie Maritime Congolaise.

On 10 April 1950, Kinshasa was sold to A/S D/S Ibis, Bergen, Norway and was renamed Anne Reed. Her port of registry was Bergen and the Code Letters LIVN were allocated. She was operated under the management of Johs Larsen, Bergen.

In July 1956, Anne Reed was sold to the Deutsche Dampfschifffarts-Gesellschaft Hansa, Bremen, West Germany. She was rebuilt by H C Stülken Sohn, Hamburg and renamed Pagenturm. She was assessed at 1,942 GRT, 964 NRT, 3,800 DWT. Her port of registry was Bremen and the Code Letters DLCY were allocated. She re-entered service on 28 September. With their introduction in the 1960s, She was allocated the IMO Number 5526869. Pagenturm served until 1964. She was sold on 19 June to Ditta Lotti, La Spezia, Italy for scrapping.
