= Cross-country skiing at the 1968 Winter Olympics – Men's 50 kilometre =

Men's 50 kilometre at the X Olympic Winter Games
- Cross-country skiing
- Venue: Autrans
- Dates: 17 February 1968
- Competitors: 51
- Winning time: 2:28:45.8

Medalists
1st place, gold medalist(s)		Ole Ellefsæter; Norway
2nd place, silver medalist(s)		Vyacheslav Vedenin; Soviet Union
3rd place, bronze medalist(s)		Josef Haas; Switzerland

The men's 50 kilometre cross-country skiing competition at the 1968 Winter Olympics in Grenoble, France, was held on Saturday 17 February at Autrans. Gjermund Eggen of Norway was the defending World champion while Sixten Jernberg of Sweden was the defending Olympic champion.

Each skier started at half a minute intervals, skiing the entire 50 kilometre course. Of the 51 athletes who started the race, 4 did not finish.

Ole Ellefsæter of Norway took his second gold medal of the Games after being a part of Norway's winning team in the 4×10 kilometre relay earlier in the games.

== Results ==
Rank	Bib	Name	Country	Time	Deficit
1st place, gold medalist(s)	23	Ole Ellefsæter	Norway	2:28:45.8	–
2nd place, silver medalist(s)	41	Vyacheslav Vedenin	Soviet Union	2:29:02.5	+16.7
3rd place, bronze medalist(s)	31	Josef Haas	Switzerland	2:29:14.8	+29.0
4	42	Pål Tyldum	Norway	2:29:26.7	+40.9
5	5	Melcher Risberg	Sweden	2:29:37.0	+51.2
6	52	Gunnar Larsson	Sweden	2:29:37.2	+51.4
7	25	Jan Halvarsson	Sweden	2:30:05.9	+1:20.1
8	51	Reidar Hjermstad	Norway	2:31:01.8	+2:16.0
9	28	Walter Demel	West Germany	2:31:14.4	+2:28.6
10	45	Assar Rönnlund	Sweden	2:31:19.3	+2:33.5
11	46	Kalevi Laurila	Finland	2:31:24.9	+2:39.1
12	36	Mario Bacher	Italy	2:31:33.8	+2:48.0
13	1	Andreas Janc	Austria	2:32:32.2	+3:46.4
14	60	Hannu Taipale	Finland	2:32:37.7	+3:51.9
15	24	Eero Mäntyranta	Finland	2:32:53.8	+4:08.0
16	9	Vladimir Voronkov	Soviet Union	2:33:07.3	+4:21.5
17	13	Aldo Stella	Italy	2:33:17.9	+4:32.1
18	2	Odd Martinsen	Norway	2:33:51.4	+5:05.6
19	3	Pauli Siitonen	Finland	2:34:31.2	+5:45.4
20	19	Anatoly Akentyev	Soviet Union	2:34:54.5	+6:08.7
21	22	Józef Rysula	Poland	2:35:30.9	+6:45.1
22	16	Mike Gallagher	United States	2:36:26.1	+7:40.3
23	47	Alois Kälin	Switzerland	2:36:40.8	+7:55.0
24	30	Roger Pires	France	2:36:44.8	+7:59.0
25	21	Gert-Dietmar Klause	East Germany	2:36:52.5	+8:06.7
26	27	Livio Stuffer	Italy	2:37:46.6	+9:00.8
27	53	Elviro Blanc	Italy	2:38:12.4	+9:26.6
28	37	Ján Fajstavr	Czechoslovakia	2:39:25.3	+10:39.5
29	12	Tokio Sato	Japan	2:40:00.5	+11:14.7
30	44	Mike Elliot	United States	2:40:38.5	+11:52.7
31	59	Igor Voronchikhin	Soviet Union	2:40:48.2	+12:02.4
32	29	Larry Damon	United States	2:41:25.2	+12:39.4
33	17	Helmut Gerlach	West Germany	2:41:55.8	+13:10.0
34	35	Franz Vetter	Austria	2:43:51.1	+15:05.3
35	14	Alojz Kerštajn	Yugoslavia	2:43:54.1	+15:08.3
36	54	Charles Kellogg	United States	2:44:00.4	+15:14.6
37	6	Franz Kälin	Switzerland	2:44:29.7	+15:43.9
38	34	Sotoo Okushiba	Japan	2:45:09.5	+16:23.7
39	56	Vít Fousek Jr.	Czechoslovakia	2:45:09.8	+16:24.0
40	50	Fernand Borrel	France	2:45:10.6	+16:24.8
41	7	Claude Legrand	France	2:45:36.9	+16:51.1
42	20	Tibor Holéczy	Hungary	2:45:38.0	+16:52.2
43	40	Siegfried Weiss	West Germany	2:46:53.4	+18:07.6
44	38	Luc Colin	France	2:48:27.9	+19:42.1
45	8	Miklós Holló	Hungary	2:51:24.1	+22:38.3
46	32	David Rees	Canada	2:56:00.5	+27:14.7
47	10	Chong-Ihm Yoon	South Korea	3:27:22.5	+58:36.7
	11	Václav Peřina	Czechoslovakia	DNF	
	26	Janez Mlinar	Yugoslavia	DNF	
	49	Denis Mast	Switzerland	DNF	
	57	Klaus Ganter	West Germany	DNF	
	4	Petar Pankov	Bulgaria	DNS	
	15	Gerhard Grimmer	East Germany	DNS	
	18	Karel Štefl	Czechoslovakia	DNS	
	33	Choon-Kie Kim	South Korea	DNS	
	39	Akiyoshi Matsuoka	Japan	DNS	
	43	Nils Skulbru	Canada	DNS	
	48	Helmut Unger	East Germany	DNS	
	55	Peter Thiel	East Germany	DNS	
	39	Kazuo Sato	Japan	DNS	
