= Cross-country skiing at the 1968 Winter Olympics – Men's 4 × 10 kilometre relay =

Men's 4 × 10 kilometre relay at the X Olympic Winter Games
- Cross-country skiing
- Venue: Autrans
- Date: 14 February 1968
- Competitors: 60 (15 teams) from 15 nations
- Winning time: 2:08:33.5

Medalists
1st place, gold medalist(s)		Odd Martinsen; Pål Tyldum; Harald Grønningen; Ole Ellefsæter	Norway
2nd place, silver medalist(s)		Jan Halvarsson; Bjarne Andersson; Gunnar Larsson; Assar Rönnlund	Sweden
3rd place, bronze medalist(s)		Kalevi Oikarainen; Hannu Taipale; Kalevi Laurila; Eero Mäntyranta	Finland

The 4 × 10 kilometre relay cross-country skiing at the 1968 Winter Olympics in Grenoble, France was held on Wednesday 14 February at Autrans. It was the seventh appearance of the 4 × 10 km relay in the Winter Olympics.

It was the first time that Norway won the gold medal in the event. Sweden finished second in the relay, Finland in third place.

== Results ==
Rank	Bib	Team	Time	Deficit
1st place, gold medalist(s)	1	Norway; Odd Martinsen; Pål Tyldum; Harald Grønningen; Ole Ellefsæter	2:08:33.5	–
2nd place, silver medalist(s)	4	Sweden; Jan Halvarsson; Bjarne Andersson; Gunnar Larsson; Assar Rönnlund	2:10:13.2	+1:39.7
3rd place, bronze medalist(s)	2	Finland; Kalevi Oikarainen; Hannu Taipale; Kalevi Laurila; Eero Mäntyranta	2:10:56.7	+2:23.2
4	5	Soviet Union; Vladimir Voronkov; Anatoly Akentyev; Valery Tarakanov; Vyacheslav Vedenin	2:10:57.2	+2:23.7
5	6	Switzerland; Konrad Hischier; Josef Haas; Flury Koch; Alois Kälin	2:15:32.4	+6:58.9
6	3	Italy; Giulio Deflorian; Franco Nones; Palmiro Serafini; Aldo Stella	2:16:32.2	+7:58.7
7	8	East Germany; Gerhard Grimmer; Axel Lesser; Peter Thiel; Gert-Dietmar Klause	2:19:22.8	+10:49.3
8	9	West Germany; Helmut Gerlach; Walter Demel; Herbert Steinbeißer; Karl Buhl	2:19:37.6	+11:04.1
9	14	Czechoslovakia; Ján Fajstavr; Vít Fousek Jr. Václav Peřina; Karel Štefl	2:19:51.3	+11:17.8
10	10	Japan; Tokio Sato; Sotoo Okushiba; Kazuo Sato; Akiyoshi Matsuoka	2:20:54.8	+12:21.3
11	7	France; Félix Mathieu; Victor Arbez; Philippe Baradel; Roger Pires	2:21:23.0	+12:49.5
12	11	United States; Mike Gallagher; Mike Elliott; Bob Gray; John Bower	2:21:30.4	+12:56.9
13	15	Austria; Heinrich Wallner; Franz Vetter; Ernst Pühringer; Andreas Janc	2:22:29.4	+13:55.9
14	12	Canada; Nils Skulbru; Rolf Pettersen; Esko Karu; David Rees	2:29:12.7	+20:39.2
15	12	Turkey; Rızvan Özbey; Yaşar Ören; Şeref Çınar; Naci Öğün	3:01:52.1	+53:18.6
