= Cross-country skiing at the 1968 Winter Olympics – Men's 30 kilometre =

Men's 30 kilometre at the X Olympic Winter Games
- Venue: Autrans
- Dates: 7 February 1968
- Competitors: 66 from 22 nations
- Winning time: 1:35:39.2

Medalists
1st place, gold medalist(s)		Franco Nones; Italy
2nd place, silver medalist(s)		Odd Martinsen; Norway
3rd place, bronze medalist(s)		Eero Mäntyranta; Finland

The men's 30 kilometre cross-country skiing competition at the 1968 Winter Olympics in Grenoble, France, was held on Wednesday 7 February at Autrans.

Each skier started at half a minute intervals, skiing the entire 30 kilometre course. Eero Mäntyranta of Finland was the 1966 World champion and also the defending Olympic champion from the 1964 Olympics in Innsbruck, Austria.

== Results ==
Rank	Bib	Name	Country	Time	Deficit
1st place, gold medalist(s)	26	Franco Nones	Italy	1:35:39.2	–
2nd place, silver medalist(s)	52	Odd Martinsen	Norway	1:36:28.9	+49.7
3rd place, bronze medalist(s)	33	Eero Mäntyranta	Finland	1:36:55.3	+1:16.1
4	45	Vladimir Voronkov	Soviet Union	1:37:10.8	+1:31.6
5	64	Giulio Deflorian	Italy	1:37:12.9	+1:33.7
6	55	Kalevi Laurila	Finland	1:37:29.8	+1:50.6
7	46	Kalevi Oikarainen	Finland	1:37:34.4	+1:55.2
8	25	Gunnar Larsson	Sweden	1:37:48.1	+2:08.9
9	62	Walter Demel	West Germany	1:37:49.2	+2:10.0
10	12	Anatoly Akentyev	Soviet Union	1:37:52.4	+2:13.2
11	2	Lorns Skjemstad	Norway	1:37:53.4	+2:14.2
12	41	Jan Halvarsson	Sweden	1:38:23.2	+2:44.0
13	50	Harald Grønningen	Norway	1:38:26.7	+2:47.5
14	30	Vyacheslav Vedenin	Soviet Union	1:38:36.1	+2:56.9
15	47	Gerhard Grimmer	East Germany	1:38:46.0	+3:06.8
16	4	Arto Tiainen	Finland	1:38:51.1	+3:11.9
17	54	Valery Tarakanov	Soviet Union	1:39:25.0	+3:45.8
18	60	Karel Štefl	Czechoslovakia	1:39:25.7	+3:46.5
19	32	Gert-Dietmar Klause	East Germany	1:39:30.5	+3:51.3
20	8	Bruno Åvik	Sweden	1:39:38.1	+3:58.9
21	66	Ingvar Sandström	Sweden	1:39:47.5	+4:08.3
22	35	Ján Fajstavr	Czechoslovakia	1:40:05.1	+4:25.9
23	51	Franco Stella	Italy	1:40:42.0	+5:02.8
24	17	Václav Peřina	Czechoslovakia	1:40:58.0	+5:18.8
25	3	Franco Manfroi	Italy	1:41:11.8	+5:32.6
26	21	Petar Pankov	Bulgaria	1:41:42.9	+6:03.7
27	28	Mike Gallagher	United States	1:41:58.2	+6:19.0
28	6	Denis Mast	Switzerland	1:41:58.8	+6:19.6
29	5	Mike Elliott	United States	1:42:22.6	+6:43.4
30	22	Konrad Hischier	Switzerland	1:42:26.1	+6:46.9
31	15	Karl Buhl	West Germany	1:42:52.2	+7:13.0
32	65	Flury Koch	Switzerland	1:43:06.9	+7:27.7
33	40	Tokio Sato	Japan	1:43:13.8	+7:34.6
34	24	Gjermund Eggen	Norway	1:43:29.6	+7:50.4
35	49	Fritz Stuessi	Switzerland	1:43:57.8	+8:18.6
36	58	Axel Lesser	East Germany	1:44:16.2	+8:37.0
37	14	Helmut Unger	East Germany	1:44:47.9	+9:08.7
38	63	Ernst Pühringer	Austria	1:44:51.0	+9:11.8
39	9	Jean Jobez	France	1:45:08.8	+9:29.6
40	20	Franz Vetter	Austria	1:45:11.2	+9:32.0
41	37	Philippe Baradel	France	1:45:33.3	+9:54.1
42	16	Luc Colin	France	1:45:40.7	+10:01.5
43	56	Roger Pires	France	1:45:54.6	+10:15.4
44	10	Alojz Kerštajn	Yugoslavia	1:46:09.5	+10:30.3
45	53	Kazuo Sato	Japan	1:46:12.4	+10:33.2
46	34	Herbert Steinbeßer	West Germany	1:46:31.2	+10:52.0
47	38	Janez Mlinar	Yugoslavia	1:46:43.2	+11:04.0
48	1	Karl-Heinz Scherzinger	West Germany	1:47:08.4	+11:29.2
49	18	Mirko Bavče	Yugoslavia	1:47:48.9	+12:09.7
50	42	Hansjörg Farbmacher	Austria	1:49:43.3	+14:04.1
51	57	Charles Kellogg	United States	1:50:03.7	+14:24.5
52	59	Nils Skulbru	Canada	1:50:06.1	+14:26.9
53	29	Svend Carlsen	Denmark	1:50:51.8	+15:12.6
54	48	Luvsan-Ayuushiin Dashdemberel	Mongolia	1:50:52.7	+15:13.5
55	36	Jon Lufkin	United States	1:51:21.2	+15:42.0
56	61	Gendgeegiin Batmönkh	Mongolia	1:51:39.1	+15:59.9
57	23	Tibor Holéczy	Hungary	1:51:42.0	+16:02.8
58	39	David Rees	Canada	1:52:46.6	+17:07.4
59	44	Miklós Holló	Hungary	1:53:41.1	+18:01.9
60	19	Ross Martin	Australia	1:55:17.3	+19:38.1
61	27	Rolf Pettersen	Canada	1:55:37.2	+19:58.0
62	7	Apollo Lynge	Denmark	1:55:40.0	+20:00.8
63	31	Choon-Kie Kim	South Korea	2:11:51.3	+36:12.1
	11	Dimitrios Andreadis	Greece	DNF	
	13	Vít Fousek Jr.	Czechoslovakia	DNF	
	33	Chong-Ihm Yoon	South Korea	DNF	
