= List of 1968 Winter Olympics medal winners =

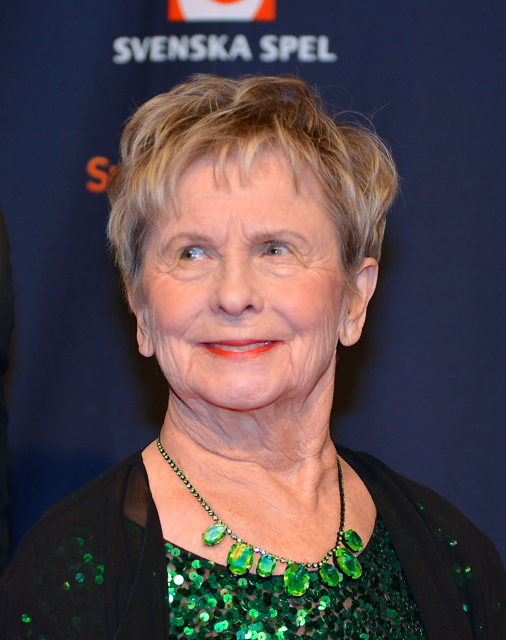
Toini Gustafsson of Sweden won three medals in cross-country skiing in Grenoble.

The 1968 Winter Olympics, officially known as the X Olympic Winter Games, was a winter multi-sport event held in Grenoble, France, from 6 to 18 February 1968. A total of 1,158 athletes representing 37 National Olympic Committees (NOCs) participated in 35 events from 10 different sports and disciplines. The Olympic programme was largely unchanged from four years prior in Innsbruck; one event was added, a relay event in biathlon.

Norway won the most medals, with 14, and the most gold medals with 6. The Soviet Union finished second in both tallies, with 5 golds and 13 medals in total. Of the 37 NOCs to participate at Grenoble, 15 won at least one medal, with 13 of those winning at least one gold medal. East and West Germany entered separate teams for the first time, having competed together in the three prior Winter Olympics. Both nations won gold medals, their first competing as different nations. Czechoslovakia won its first gold Winter Olympics medal, achieved by Jiří Raška in the ski jumping normal hill event. Romania won its first, and as of the 2018 Winter Olympics, only medal in a Winter Olympics in the two-man bobsleigh event.

Jean-Claude Killy of France was the most successful athlete at these games, winning all three of the men's alpine skiing events. Two other athletes each won three medals: Sweden's Toini Gustafsson earned two golds and a silver, and Finland's Eero Mäntyranta won a silver and two bronzes. Both of them were competitors in cross-country skiing. Four other athletes—Luciano de Paolis, Ole Ellefsæter, Harald Grønningen, and Eugenio Monti—won two gold medals, and 29 individuals in total won at least two medals in Grenoble. In speed skating, three different events ended with ties for the silver medal position, one, the women's 500 metres ended in a three-way tie for silver. In all three cases, multiple silver medals and no bronze medals were awarded. In figure skating, American Peggy Flemming won the gold medal in ladies' singles; this came a mere seven years after the 1961 crash of Sabena Flight 548 that killed the entire US figure skating team.

== Alpine skiing ==
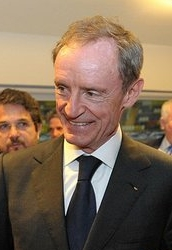
Jean-Claude Killy won all three men's events in alpine skiing.

Event	Gold	Silver	Bronze
Men's downhill	Jean-Claude Killy; France	Guy Périllat; France	Jean-Daniel Dätwyler; Switzerland
Men's giant slalom	Jean-Claude Killy; France	Willy Favre; Switzerland	Heini Messner; Austria
Men's slalom	Jean-Claude Killy; France	Herbert Huber; Austria	Alfred Matt; Austria
Women's downhill	Olga Pall; Austria	Isabelle Mir; France	Christl Haas; Austria
Women's giant slalom	Nancy Greene; Canada	Annie Famose; France	Fernande Bochatay; Switzerland
Women's slalom	Marielle Goitschel; France	Nancy Greene; Canada	Annie Famose; France

== Biathlon ==
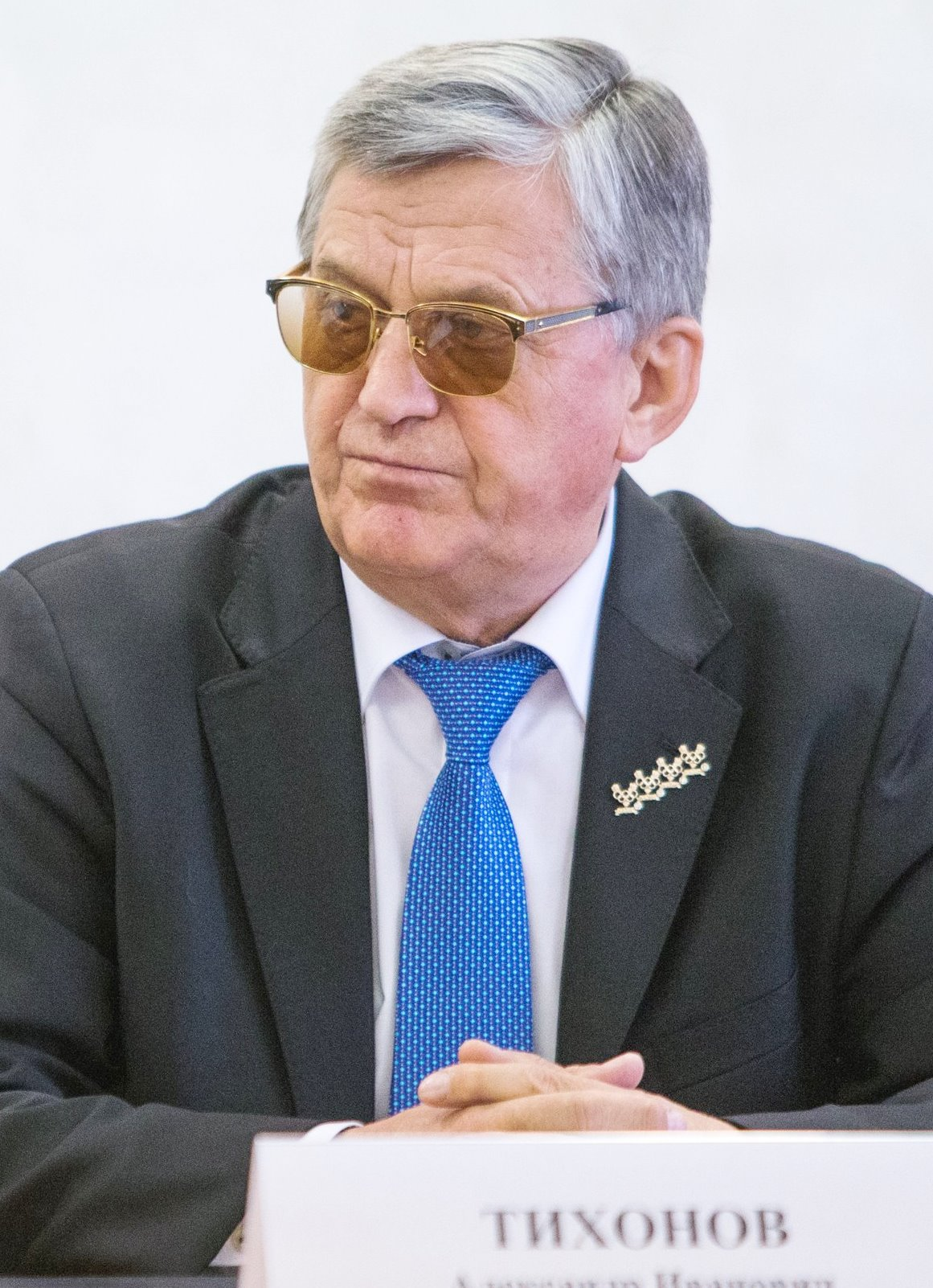
Aleksandr Tikhonov won the first two of his ultimate five medals in Grenoble.

Event	Gold	Silver	Bronze
Men's Individual	Magnar Solberg; Norway	Aleksandr Tikhonov; Soviet Union	Vladimir Gundartsev; Soviet Union
Men's Relay	Soviet Union; Aleksandr Tikhonov; Nikolay Puzanov; Viktor Mamatov; Vladimir Gundartsev	Norway; Ola Wærhaug; Olav Jordet; Magnar Solberg; Jon Istad	Sweden; Lars-Göran Arwidson; Tore Eriksson; Olle Petrusson; Holmfrid Olsson

== Bobsleigh ==
Event	Gold	Silver	Bronze
Two-man	Italy (ITA-1); Eugenio Monti; Luciano De Paolis	West Germany (FRG-1); Horst Floth; Pepi Bader	Romania (ROU-1); Ion Panțuru; Nicolae Neagoe
Four-man	Italy (ITA-1); Eugenio Monti; Luciano De Paolis; Roberto Zandonella; Mario Armano	Austria (AUT-1); Erwin Thaler; Reinhold Durnthaler; Herbert Gruber; Josef Eder	Switzerland (SUI-1); Jean Wicki; Hans Candrian; Willi Hofmann; Walter Graf

== Cross-country skiing ==
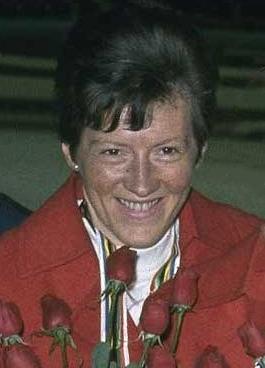
Inger Aufles won a gold and a bronze medal in 1968.

Event	Gold	Silver	Bronze
Men's 15 km	Harald Grønningen; Norway	Eero Mäntyranta; Finland	Gunnar Larsson; Sweden
Men's 30 km	Franco Nones; Italy	Odd Martinsen; Norway	Eero Mäntyranta; Finland
Men's 50 km	Ole Ellefsæter; Norway	Vyacheslav Vedenin; Soviet Union	Josef Haas; Switzerland
Men's 4×10 km	Norway; Odd Martinsen; Pål Tyldum; Harald Grønningen; Ole Ellefsæter	Sweden; Jan Halvarsson; Bjarne Andersson; Gunnar Larsson; Assar Rönnlund	Finland; Kalevi Oikarainen; Hannu Taipale; Kalevi Laurila; Eero Mäntyranta
Women's 5 km	Toini Gustafsson; Sweden	Galina Kulakova; Soviet Union	Alevtina Kolchina; Soviet Union
Women's 10 km	Toini Gustafsson; Sweden	Berit Mørdre; Norway	Inger Aufles; Norway
Women's 3×5 km	Norway; Inger Aufles; Babben Enger; Berit Mørdre Lammedal	Sweden; Barbro Martinsson; Toini Gustafsson; Britt Strandberg	Soviet Union; Alevtina Kolchina; Rita Achkina; Galina Kulakova

== Figure skating ==
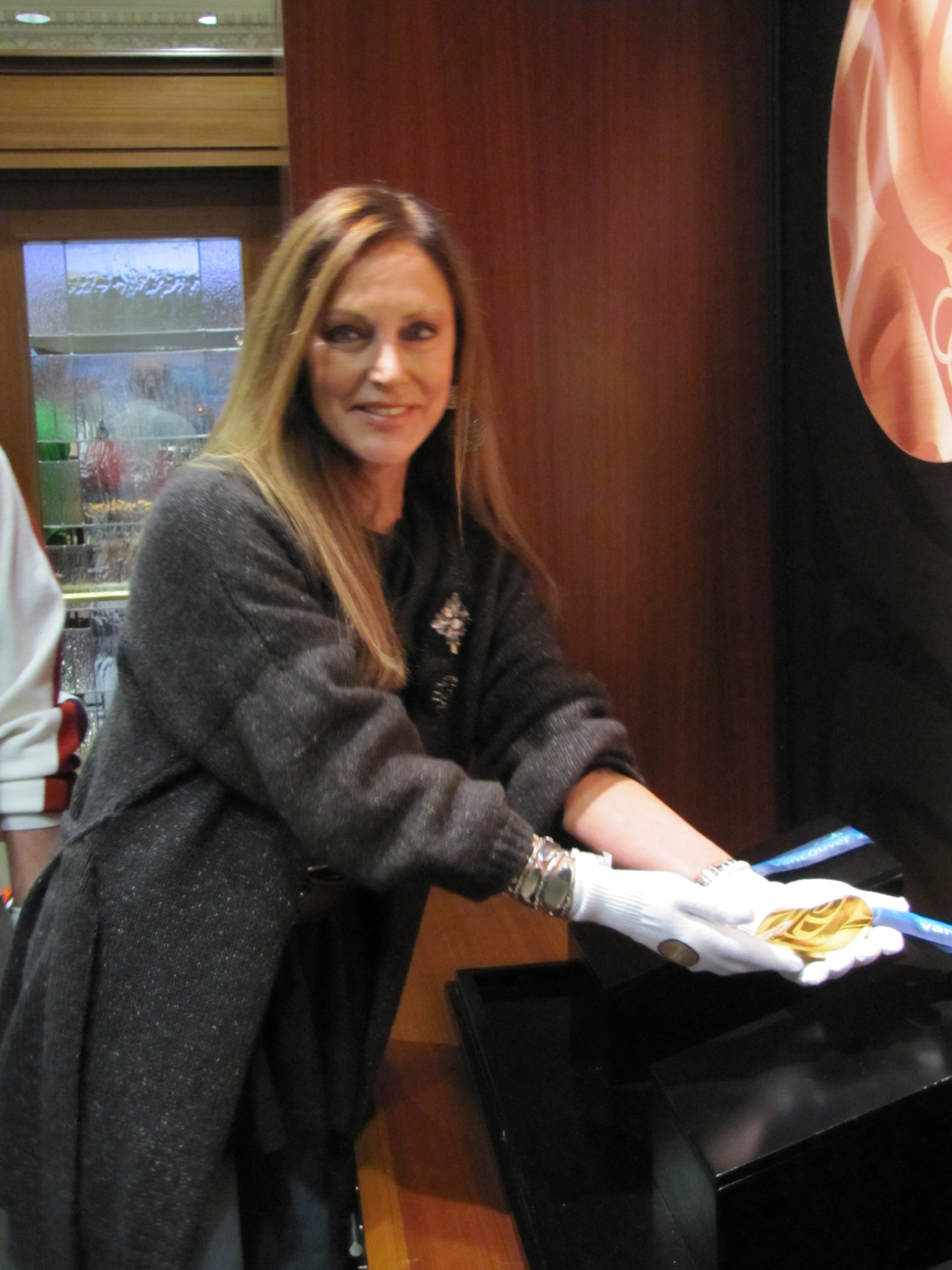
Peggy Fleming won gold in the ladies' singles event.

Event	Gold	Silver	Bronze
Men's singles	Wolfgang Schwarz; Austria	Tim Wood; United States	Patrick Péra; France
Ladies' singles	Peggy Fleming; United States	Gabriele Seyfert; East Germany	Hana Mašková; Czechoslovakia
Pairs	Soviet Union; Liudmila Belousova; Oleg Protopopov	Soviet Union; Tatiana Zhuk; Alexander Gorelik	West Germany; Margot Glockshuber; Wolfgang Danne

== Ice hockey ==
Event	Gold	Silver	Bronze
Men's team	Soviet Union; Viktor Konovalenko; Viktor Zinger; Viktor Blinov; Vitalij Davidov; Viktor Kuzkin; Alexandr Ragulin; Oleg Zaytsev; Igor Romishevsky; Anatolij Firsov; Vyacheslav Starshinov; Viktor Polupanov; Vladimir Vikulov; Venjamin Alexandrov; Yury Moiseyev; Yevgeni Mishakov; Yevgeni Zimin; Anatoly Ionov; Boris Majorov	Czechoslovakia; Vladimír Nadrchal; Vladimír Dzurilla; Josef Horešovský; Jan Suchý; Karel Masopust; František Pospíšil; Oldřich Machač; Jozef Golonka; Jan Hrbatý; Václav Nedomanský; Jan Havel; Jaroslav Jiřík; Josef Černý; František Ševčík; Petr Hejma; Jiří Holík; Jiří Kochta; Jan Klapáč	Canada; Roger Bourbonnais; Ken Broderick; Ray Cadieux; Paul Conlin; Gary Dineen; Brian Glennie; Ted Hargreaves; Fran Huck; Marshall Johnston; Barry MacKenzie; Bill MacMillan; Steve Monteith; Morris Mott; Terry O'Malley; Danny O'Shea; Gerry Pinder; Herb Pinder; Wayne Stephenson

== Luge ==
Event	Gold	Silver	Bronze
Men's singles	Manfred Schmid; Austria	Thomas Köhler; East Germany	Klaus-Michael Bonsack; East Germany
Women's singles	Erika Lechner; Italy	Christa Schmuck; West Germany	Angelika Dünhaupt; West Germany
Doubles	East Germany; Klaus-Michael Bonsack; Thomas Köhler	Austria; Manfred Schmid; Ewald Walch	West Germany; Wolfgang Winkler; Fritz Nachmann

== Nordic combined ==
Event	Gold	Silver	Bronze
Individual	Franz Keller; West Germany	Alois Kälin; Switzerland	Andreas Kunz; East Germany

== Ski jumping ==
Event	Gold	Silver	Bronze
Normal hill individual	Jiří Raška; Czechoslovakia	Reinhold Bachler; Austria	Baldur Preiml; Austria
Large hill individual	Vladimir Belousov; Soviet Union	Jiří Raška; Czechoslovakia	Lars Grini; Norway

== Speed skating ==
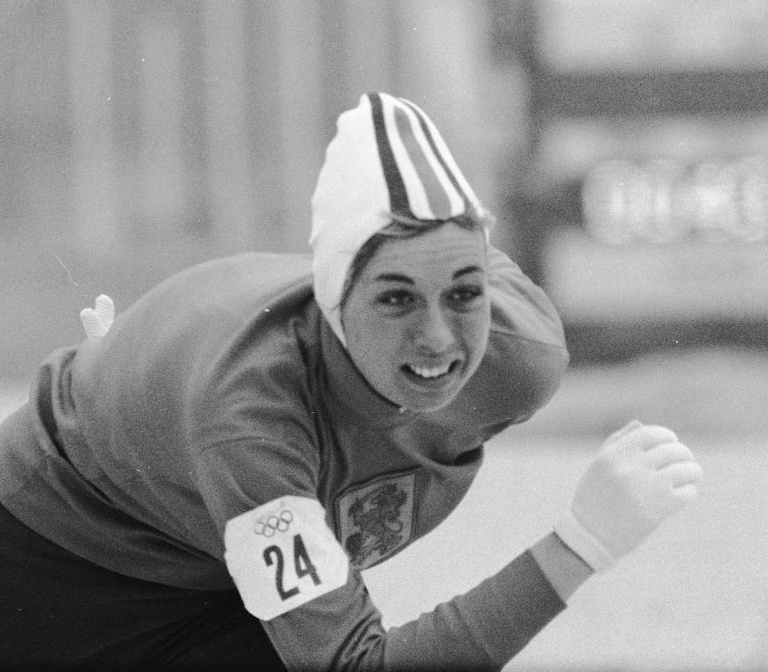
Carry Geijssen won a gold and a silver in Grenoble.

Event	Gold	Silver	Bronze
Men's 500 metres	Erhard Keller; West Germany	Terry McDermott; United States Magne Thomassen; Norway	None awarded^{[a]}
Men's 1500 metres	Kees Verkerk; Netherlands	Ivar Eriksen; Norway Ard Schenk; Netherlands	None awarded^{[b]}
Men's 5000 metres	Fred Anton Maier; Norway	Kees Verkerk; Netherlands	Peter Nottet; Netherlands
Men's 10000 metres	Johnny Höglin; Sweden	Fred Anton Maier; Norway	Örjan Sandler; Sweden
Women's 500 metres	Lyudmila Titova; Soviet Union	Jenny Fish; United States Dianne Holum; United States Mary Meyers; United States	None awarded^{[c]}
Women's 1000 metres	Carry Geijssen; Netherlands	Lyudmila Titova; Soviet Union	Dianne Holum; United States
Women's 1500 metres	Kaija Mustonen; Finland	Carry Geijssen; Netherlands	Stien Kaiser; Netherlands
Women's 3000 metres	Ans Schut; Netherlands	Kaija Mustonen; Finland	Stien Kaiser; Netherlands

== Multiple medalists ==
Athletes who won three medals or two gold medals during the 1968 Winter Olympics are listed below.

Athlete	Nation	Sport	Gold	Silver	Bronze	Total
Jean-Claude Killy	France	Alpine skiing	3	0	0	3
Toini Gustafsson	Sweden	Cross-country skiing	2	1	0	3
Eero Mäntyranta	Finland	Cross-country skiing	0	1	2	3
Luciano de Paolis	Italy	Bobsleigh	2	0	0	2
Ole Ellefsæter	Norway	Cross-country skiing	2	0	0	2
Harald Grønningen	Norway	Cross-country skiing	2	0	0	2
Eugenio Monti	Italy	Bobsleigh	2	0	0	2

== Notes ==
- ^{a} No bronze medal was awarded in this event because two competitors tied for second place with a time of 40.5 seconds.
- ^{b} No bronze medal was awarded in this event because two competitors tied for second place with a time of 2 minutes 5.0 seconds.
- ^{c} No bronze medal was awarded in this event because three competitors tied for second place with a time of 46.3 seconds.

== See also ==
- 1968 Winter Olympics medal table
