= Cross-country skiing at the 1968 Winter Olympics – Men's 15 kilometre =

Men's 15 kilometre at the X Olympic Winter Games
- Venue: Autrans
- Dates: 10 February 1968
- Competitors: 75 from 25 nations
- Winning time: 47:54.2

Medalists
1st place, gold medalist(s)		Harald Grønningen	Norway
2nd place, silver medalist(s)		Eero Mäntyranta	Finland
3rd place, bronze medalist(s)		Gunnar Larsson	Sweden

The men's 15 kilometre cross-country skiing competition at the 1968 Winter Olympics in Grenoble, France, was held on Saturday 10 February at Autrans.

Each skier started at half a minute intervals, skiing the entire 15 kilometre course. Gjermund Eggen of Norway was the 1966 World champion and Eero Mäntyranta of Finland was the defending Olympic champion from the 1964 Olympics in Innsbruck, Austria.

== Results ==
Rank	Bib	Name	Country	Time	Deficit
1st place, gold medalist(s)	5	Harald Grønningen	Norway	47:54.2	–
2nd place, silver medalist(s)	29	Eero Mäntyranta	Finland	47:56.1	+1.9
3rd place, bronze medalist(s)	66	Gunnar Larsson	Sweden	48:33.7	+39.5
4	65	Kalevi Laurila	Finland	48:37.6	+43.4
5	12	Jan Halvarsson	Sweden	48:39.1	+44.9
6	41	Bjarne Andersson	Sweden	48:41.1	+46.9
7	57	Pål Tyldum	Norway	48:42.0	+47.8
8	62	Odd Martinsen	Norway	48:49.3	+55.1
9	17	Valery Tarakanov	Soviet Union	49:04.4	+1:10.2
10	54	Kalevi Oikarainen	Finland	49:11.1	+1:16.9
11	26	Assar Rönnlund	Sweden	49:25.3	+1:31.1
12	55	Walter Demel	West Germany	49:38.4	+1:44.2
13	14	Franco Stella	Italy	49:59.8	+2:05.6
14	72	Karel Štefl	Czechoslovakia	50:15.4	+2:21.2
15	47	Giulio Deflorian	Italy	50:19.4	+2:25.2
16	48	Anatoly Akentyev	Soviet Union	50:19.9	+2:25.7
17	39	Reidar Hjermstad	Norway	50:25.7	+2:31.5
18	42	Josef Haas	Switzerland	50:34.8	+2:40.6
19	74	Flury Koch	Switzerland	50:37.2	+2:43.0
20	38	Karl Buhl	West Germany	50:38.1	+2:43.9
21	52	Józef Rysula	Poland	50:38.5	+2:44.3
22	69	Vladimir Voronkov	Soviet Union	50:40.7	+2:46.5
23	45	Ján Fajstavr	Czechoslovakia	50:46.5	+2:52.3
24	4	Roger Pires	France	50:52.6	+2:58.4
25	19	Petar Pankov	Bulgaria	50:54.1	+2:59.9
26	28	Fyodor Simashov	Soviet Union	51:05.3	+3:11.1
27	27	Václav Peřina	Czechoslovakia	51:06.6	+3:12.4
28	32	Victor Arbez	France	51:20.5	+3:26.3
29	33	Gerhard Grimmer	East Germany	51:22.1	+3:27.9
30	8	Albert Giger	Switzerland	51:26.6	+3:32.4
31	53	Andreas Janc	Austria	51:29.8	+3:35.6
32	68	Franco Manfroi	Italy	51:47.7	+3:53.5
33	58	Gert-Dietmar Klause	East Germany	51:51.6	+3:57.4
34	44	Mike Gallagher	United States	52:02.4	+4:08.2
35	20	Konrad Hischier	Switzerland	52:06.4	+4:12.2
36	22	Franco Nones	Italy	52:06.8	+4:12.6
37	2	Peter Thiel	East Germany	52:07.8	+4:13.6
38	71	Helmut Gerlach	West Germany	52:21.8	+4:27.6
39	7	Klaus Ganter	West Germany	52:30.0	+4:35.8
40	9	Alojz Kerštajn	Yugoslavia	52:31.7	+4:37.5
41	21	Mike Elliott	United States	52:40.8	+4:46.6
42	67	Heinrich Wallner	Austria	52:53.6	+4:59.4
43	31	Janez Mlinar	Yugoslavia	52:54.4	+5:00.2
44	59	Felix Mathieu	France	52:58.8	+5:04.6
45	50	Mirko Bavče	Yugoslavia	53:10.7	+5:16.5
46	64	Jean Jobez	France	53:22.1	+5:27.9
47	35	Ernst Pühringer	Austria	53:23.0	+5:28.8
48	6	Bob Gray	United States	53:24.8	+5:30.6
49	46	Tibor Holéczy	Hungary	53:35.9	+5:41.7
50	75	Tokio Sato	Japan	53:41.2	+5:47.0
51	15	Walter Failer	Austria	54:12.5	+6:18.3
52	60	Gendgeegin Batmönkh	Mongolia	54:21.3	+6:27.1
53	34	Akiyoshi Matsuoka	Japan	54:46.2	+6:52.0
54	30	Luvsan-Ayuushiin Dashdemberel	Mongolia	54:46.4	+6:52.2
55	73	Larry Damon	United States	55:07.2	+7:13.0
56	76	Nils Skulbru	Canada	55:53.4	+7:59.2
57	51	Svend Carlsen	Denmark	56:09.5	+8:15.3
58	43	Tom Dakin	Great Britain	56:49.9	+8:55.7
59	63	Peter Tancock	Great Britain	57:31.1	+9:36.9
60	24	Ross Martin	Australia	58:00.2	+10:06.0
61	56	David Rees	Canada	58:25.9	+10:31.7
62	13	Yun Jong-im	South Korea	58:28.2	+10:34.0
63	37	Rolf Pettersen	Canada	58:31.8	+10:37.6
64	36	Miklós Holló	Hungary	58:37.2	+10:43.0
65	10	Hiroshi Ogawa	Japan	59:55.4	+12:01.2
66	23	Kim Chun-gi	South Korea	1:00:04.8	+12:10.6
67	18	Apollo Lynge	Denmark	1:00:34.8	+12:40.6
68	3	Dimitrios Andreadis	Greece	1:00:52.1	+12:57.9
69	1	Şeref Çınar	Turkey	1:04:12.2	+16:18.0
70	61	Rızvan Özbey	Turkey	1:05:02.3	+17:08.1
71	25	Naci Öğün	Turkey	1:05:56.4	+18:02.2
72	49	Yaşar Ören	Turkey	1:09:03.6	+21:09.4
	11	Hannu Taipale	Finland	DNF	
	40	Kazuo Sato	Japan	DNF	
	70	Axel Lesser	East Germany	DNF	
	16	Vít Fousek Jr.	Czechoslovakia	DNS	
