= Cross-country skiing at the 1964 Winter Olympics – Men's 4 × 10 kilometre relay =

Men's 4 × 10 kilometre relay at the IX Olympic Winter Games
- Cross-country skiing
- Venue: Cross Country Skiing Stadium
- Date: 8 February 1964
- Competitors: 60 from 15 nations
- Winning time: 2-18:34.6

Medalists
| 1st place, gold medalist(s) | | Karl-Åke Asph; Sixten Jernberg; Janne Stefansson; Assar Rönnlund | Sweden |
| 2nd place, silver medalist(s) | | Väinö Huhtala; Arto Tiainen; Kalevi Laurila; Eero Mäntyranta | Finland |
| 3rd place, bronze medalist(s) | | Ivan Utrobin; Gennady Vaganov; Igor Voronchikhin; Pavel Kolchin | Soviet Union |

The men's 4 × 10 kilometre relay cross-country skiing event was part of the cross-country skiing programme at the 1964 Winter Olympics, in Innsbruck, Austria. The competition was held on 8 February 1964, at the Cross Country Skiing Stadium.

== Results ==
| Rank | Nation | Skiers | Time |
|---|---|---|---|
| 1 | Sweden | Karl-Åke Asph; Sixten Jernberg; Janne Stefansson; Assar Rönnlund | 2-18:34.6 |
| 2 | Finland | Väinö Huhtala; Arto Tiainen; Kalevi Laurila; Eero Mäntyranta | 2-18:42.4 |
| 3 | Soviet Union | Ivan Utrobin; Gennady Vaganov; Igor Voronchikhin; Pavel Kolchin | 2-18:46.9 |
| 4 | Norway | Magnar Lundemo; Erling Steineide; Einar Østby; Harald Grønningen | 2-19:11.9 |
| 5 | Italy | Giuseppe Steiner; Marcello De Dorigo; Giulio Deflorian; Franco Nones | 2-21:16.8 |
| 6 | France | Victor Arbez; Félix Mathieu; Roger Pires; Paul Romand | 2-26:31.4 |
| 7 | United Team of Germany | Heinz Seidel; Helmut Weidlich; Enno Röder; Walter Demel | 2-26:34.4 |
| 8 | Poland | Józef Gut Misiaga; Tadeusz Jankowski; Edward Budny; Józef Rysula | 2-27:27.0 |
| 9 | Switzerland | Konrad Hischier; Alois Kälin; Franz Kälin; Hans-Sigfrid Oberer | 2-31:52.8 |
| 10 | Japan | Hidezo Takahashi; Kazuo Sato; Tatsuo Kitamura; Chogoro Yahata | 2-32:05.5 |
| 11 | Austria | Günther Rieger; Hansjörg Farbmacher; Anton Kogler; Andreas Janc | 2-34:48.9 |
| 12 | Yugoslavia | Roman Seljak; Mirko Bavče; Janko Kobentar; Cveto Pavčič | 2-37:30.6 |
| 13 | United States | Mike Gallagher; Mike Elliott; Jim Shea; John Bower | 2-39:17.3 |
| 14 | Great Britain | John Moore; John Dent; David Rees; Roderick Tuck | 2-42:55.8 |
| 15 | Canada | Donald MacLeod; Martti Rautio; Eric Luoma; Franz Portmann | 2-44:29.1 |
