= Ole Ellefsæter =

Norwegian sportsman and singer (1939–2022)

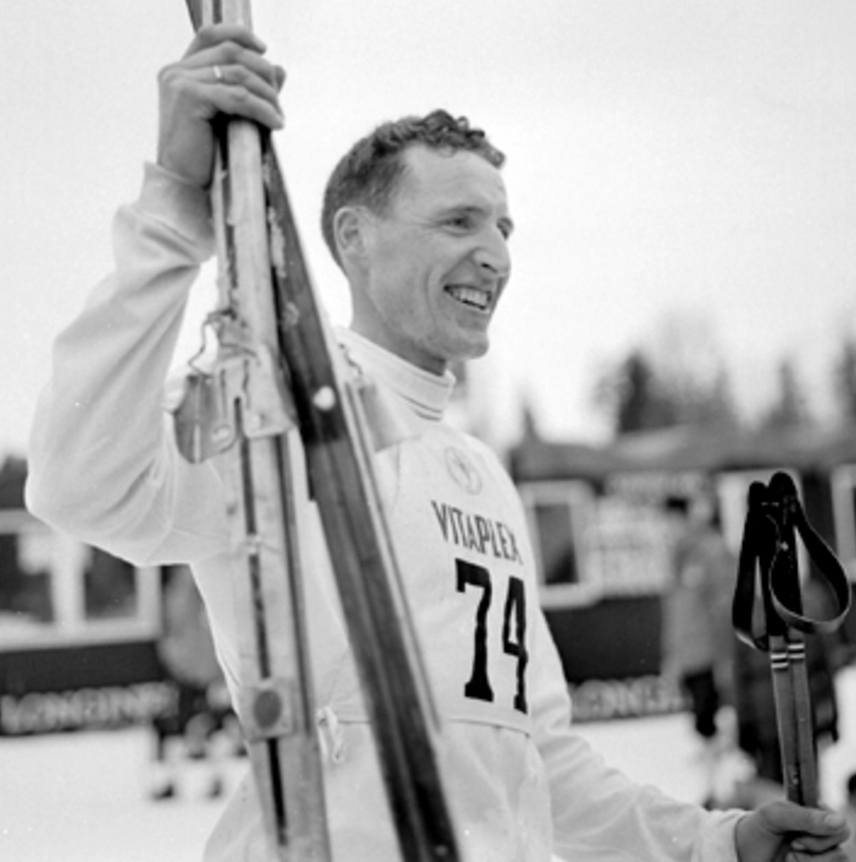
- Ole Ellefsæter in the 1960's

Personal information
- Full name: Ole Martin Ellefsæter
- Born: 15 February 1939 Furnes, Hedmark, Norway
- Died: 18 October 2022 (aged 83) Ringsaker, Norway
- Height: 183 cm (6 ft 0 in)
- Weight: 79 kg (174 lb)

Sport
- Sport: Cross-country skiing, athletics
- Event: Steeplechase
- Club: Nybygda IL

Achievements and titles
- Personal best: 3000 mS – 8:43.8 (1962)
Medal record
Men's cross-country skiing
Representing Norway
Olympic Games
Gold medal – first place	1968 Grenoble	50 km
Gold medal – first place	1968 Grenoble	4 × 10 km relay
World Championships
Gold medal – first place	1966 Oslo	4 × 10 km relay
Silver medal – second place	1966 Oslo	15 km

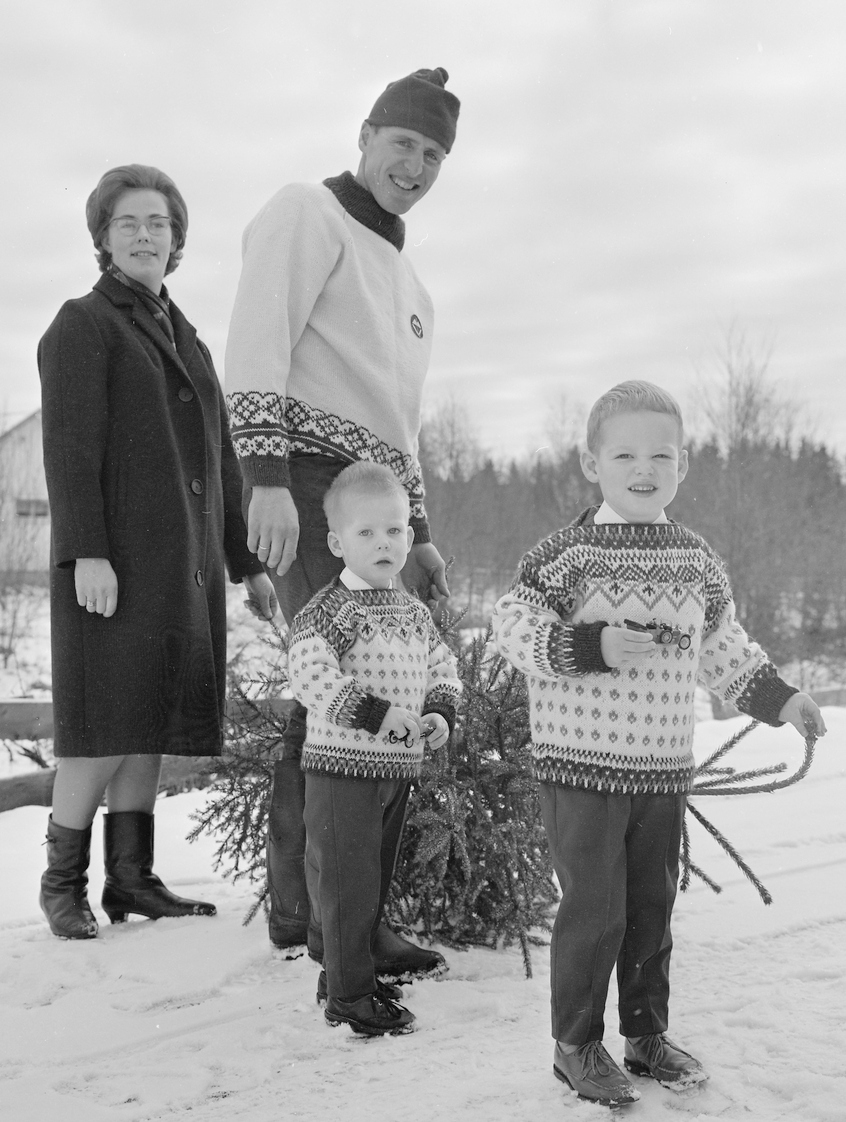
Ellefsæter with family in 1966

Ole Martin Ellefsæter (15 February 1939 – 18 October 2022) was a Norwegian athlete. He mostly competed in cross-country skiing, and won two gold medals at the 1968 Winter Olympics. At the 1966 FIS Nordic World Ski Championships he won one gold (4 × 10 km relay) and one silver (15 km) medal, and in 1971 he became the first Norwegian to win Vasaloppet.

Competing in the 3000 metres steeplechase, he won six national championships in a row, from 1960 to 1965. For his accomplishments in both sports, he was awarded Egebergs Ærespris.

Ellefsæter also had a singing career, and had two hit songs in Norway.

== Skiing career ==
Ellefsæter won the Birkebeinerrennet in 1961. He became national champion in 15 km cross-country skiing in 1964, and competed at the 1964 Winter Olympics, where his best placement was eighth in the 50 kilometre. He was the Norwegian champion in 50 km cross-country skiing in 1965. At the FIS Nordic World Ski Championships 1966 he won a gold medal in the relay with the Norwegian team, a silver medal in the 15 km, and placed fourth in the 50 km. In 1967 he won the 50 km in the Norwegian championships, as well as in the Holmenkollen Ski Festival and in the Lahti Ski Games. At the 1968 Winter Olympics, Ellefsæter won a gold medal in 50 kilometre and in the 4 × 10 kilometre relay with the Norwegian team.

In 1971 he became the first Norwegian to win Vasaloppet. He competed at the 1972 Winter Olympics, where he placed 10th in 50 km and 31st in the 30 km.

== Steeplechase career ==
Besides skiing, Ellefsæter competed in the 3000 metres steeplechase, winning the national title from 1960 to 1965. His personal best of 8:43.8 minutes was a world top-level result at the time and placed him 26th on the Norwegian all-time list. Ellefsæter competed at the 1962 European Championships, but failed to reach the final.

== Singing career ==
Ellefsæther was a popular singer. His 1966 single "Huldreslåtten" sold more than 25,000 copies in Norway. After the 1968 Olympics he had another hit "Alle kluter til", which was dedicated to the success of Norwegian team. He produced two albums, Viser og gamle takter (1967) and I godt lag (1969), the text for which was written by his neighbor Guttorm P. Haugen.

== Awards ==
For his accomplishments in both skiing and athletics Ellefsæter received the Egebergs Ærespris in 1965. Later, his statue was installed in Brumunddal where he grew up.

In 1967 he won the 50 km event at the Holmenkollen ski festival, the same year he was awarded the Holmenkollen medal, shared with Toini Gustafsson.

He received the Fearnley Olympic award in 1968.

== Personal life ==
Born on 15 February 1939, Ellefsæther worked for several years as a lumberjack, and later studied to become a forestry technician. He received the nickname "Uteligger" ("Homeless") after one skiing accident, where after a long training he was taken by surprise by the darkness, and had to stay overnight in the forest.

On 18 October 2022, Ellefsæter died after collapsing from cardiac arrest while felling trees near his home in Ringsaker. He was 83.

== Cross-country skiing results ==
All results are sourced from the International Ski Federation (FIS).

=== Olympic Games ===
- 2 medals – (2 gold)

Year	Age	15 km	30 km	50 km	4 × 10 km relay
1964	25	25	DSQ	8	—
1968	29	—	—	Gold	Gold
1972	33	—	31	10	—

=== World Championships ===
- 2 medals – (1 gold, 1 silver)

Year	Age	15 km	30 km	50 km	4 × 10 km relay
1966	27	Silver	—	4	Gold
1970	31	20	—	37	—

Preceded by Magnar Lundemo	Egebergs Ærespris; 1965	Succeeded by Fred Anton Maier
