= Cross-country skiing at the 1972 Winter Olympics – Men's 4 × 10 kilometre relay =

Men's 4 × 10 kilometre relay at the XI Olympic Winter Games
- Cross-country skiing
- Venue: Makomanai Cross Country Events Site
- Date: 13 February 1972
- Competitors: 56 (14 teams) from 14 nations
- Winning time: 2:04:47.94

Medalists
1st place, gold medalist(s)		Vladimir Voronkov; Yury Skobov; Fyodor Simashov; Vyacheslav Vedenin	Soviet Union
2nd place, silver medalist(s)		Oddvar Brå; Pål Tyldum; Ivar Formo; Johs Harviken	Norway
3rd place, bronze medalist(s)		Alfred Kälin; Albert Giger; Alois Kälin; Eduard Hauser	Switzerland

The 4 × 10 kilometre relay cross-country skiing at the 1972 Winter Olympics in Sapporo, Japan was held on Sunday 13 February at the Makomanai Cross Country Events Site. It was the eighth appearance of the 4 × 10 km relay in the Winter Olympics. It was the second time that the Soviet Union won the gold medal in the event. Norway finished second in the relay, Switzerland in third place.

== Results ==
Rank	Bib	Team	Time	Deficit
1st place, gold medalist(s)	1	Soviet Union; Vladimir Voronkov; Yury Skobov; Fyodor Simashov; Vyacheslav Vedenin	2:04:47.94	–
2nd place, silver medalist(s)	4	Norway; Oddvar Brå; Pål Tyldum; Ivar Formo; Johs Harviken	2:04:57.06	+9.12
3rd place, bronze medalist(s)	5	Switzerland; Alfred Kälin; Albert Giger; Alois Kälin; Eduard Hauser	2:07:00.06	+2:12.12
4	3	Sweden; Thomas Magnusson; Lars-Göran Åslund; Gunnar Larsson; Sven-Åke Lundbäck	2:07:03.60	+2:15.66
5	7	Finland; Hannu Taipale; Juha Mieto; Juhani Repo; Osmo Karjalainen	2:07:50.19	+3:02.25
6	2	East Germany; Gerd Heßler; Axel Lesser; Gerhard Grimmer; Gert-Dietmar Klause	2:10:03.73	+5:15.79
7	9	West Germany; Frank Betz; Urban Hettich; Hartmut Döpp; Walter Demel	2:10:42.85	+5:54.91
8	8	Czechoslovakia; Stanislav Henych; Ján Fajstavr; Ján Michalko; Ján Ilavský	2:11:27.55	+6:39.61
9	6	Italy; Carlo Favre; Elviro Blanc; Renzo Chiocchetti; Ulrico Kostner	2:12:07.11	+7:19.17
10	11	Japan; Hideo Tanijufi; Kunio Shibata; Akiyoshi Matsuoka; Tomio Okamura	2:13:59.14	+9:11.20
11	13	France; Jean-Paul Vandel; Roland Jeannerod; Gilbert Faure; Jean Jobez	2:14:35.98	+9:48.04
12	10	United States; Tim Caldwell; Mike Gallagher; Larry Martin; Mike Elliott	2:14:37.28	+9:49.34
13	14	Canada; Fred Kelly; Roger Allen; Jarl Omholt-Jensen; Malcolm Hunter	2:16:56.41	+12:08.47
	12	Austria; Herbert Wachter; Josef Hauser; Ulrich Öhlböck; Heinrich Wallner	DNF	
