= Bjarne Andersson =

Swedish cross-country skier

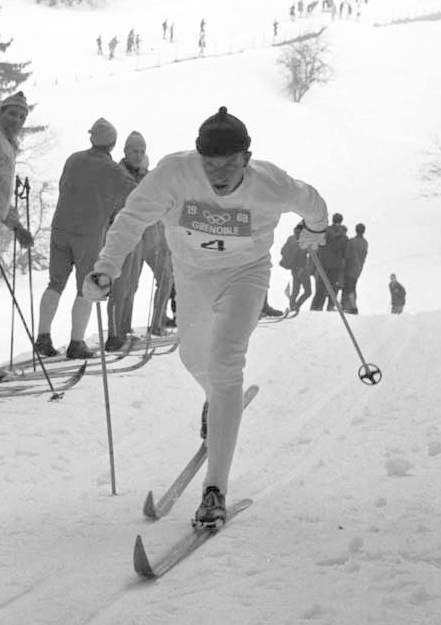
- Andersson at the 1968 Olympics

Personal information
- Born: 28 April 1940 Motala, Sweden
- Died: 12 August 2004 (aged 64) Mora, Sweden
- Height: 178 cm (5 ft 10 in)
- Weight: 68 kg (150 lb)

Sport
- Sport: Cross-country skiing
- Club: IFK Mora
Medal record
Men's cross-country skiing
Representing Sweden
Olympic Games
| Silver medal – second place | 1968 Grenoble | 4 × 10 km relay |

Bjarne Lennart "Ödeshögarn" Andersson (28 April 1940 – 12 August 2004) was a Swedish cross-country skier who won a 4 × 10 km relay silver medal at the 1968 Winter Olympics; he finished sixth in the individual 15 km race.

Andersson did his military service in the cavalry in Umeå. He was a Swedish 15 km champion in 1968, and won six national skiing titles in the 3 × 10 km relay between 1966 and 1973. He also won three individual and one team titles in cross-country running. During that time he worked at a petrol station in Mora and was clearing the forest nearby. Later he became a shoe specialist and developed a ski boot model that was named after him. After that he ran his own sports shop specializing in equipment for cross-country skiing and running. In addition, between 1976 and 1980 he coached the national ski team, and in 1983–87 worked as a sports commentator on television. He continued competing in the masters category, and won three world titles in 1997.

== Cross-country skiing results ==
All results are sourced from the International Ski Federation (FIS).

=== Olympic Games ===
- 1 medal – (1 silver)

| Year | Age | 15 km | 30 km | 50 km | 4 × 10 km relay |
|---|---|---|---|---|---|
| 1968 | 27 | 6 | — | — | Silver |

=== World Championships ===
| Year | Age | 15 km | 30 km | 50 km | 4 × 10 km relay |
|---|---|---|---|---|---|
| 1966 | 25 | 4 | 10 | — | 4 |
