= Kalevi Oikarainen =

Finnish cross-country skier (1936–2020)

Medal record

Men's cross-country skiing

Representing Finland

Olympic Games
Bronze medal – third place	1968 Grenoble	4 × 10 km relay

World Championships
Gold medal – first place	1970 Vysoké Tatry	50 km
Silver medal – second place	1966 Oslo	4 × 10 km relay

Kalevi Oikarainen (27 April 1936 – 14 August 2020) was a Finnish cross-country skier who competed between the 1950s and the 1970s.

Oikarainen was born in Kuusamo. He won a bronze medal in the 4 × 10 km relay at the 1968 Winter Olympics in Grenoble and placed seventh in the 30 km event at those same games.

Oikarainen's biggest success was at the FIS Nordic World Ski Championships, where he earned a gold in 50 km in 1970 and a silver in the 4 × 10 km relay in 1966. He also won the 15 km event at the 1959 Holmenkollen ski festival.

He died on 14 August 2020 at the age of 84.

== Cross-country skiing results ==
All results are sourced from the International Ski Federation (FIS).

=== Olympic Games ===
- 1 medal – (1 bronze)

Year	Age	15 km	30 km	50 km	4 × 10 km relay
1968	31	10	7	—	Bronze
1972	35	—	—	DNF	—

=== World Championships ===
- 2 medals – (1 gold, 1 silver)

Year	Age	15 km	30 km	50 km	4 × 10 km relay
1966	29	—	—	—	Silver
1970	33	—	—	Gold	—
