= Hannu Taipale =

Finnish cross-country skier

Medal record

Men's cross-country skiing

Representing Finland

Olympic Games
| Bronze medal – third place | 1968 Grenoble | 4 × 10 km relay |

World Championships
| Silver medal – second place | 1966 Oslo | 4 × 10 km relay |

Hannu Taipale (born 22 June 1940 in Veteli) is a Finnish former cross-country skier who competed during the 1960s. He won a bronze medal in the 4 × 10 km relay at the 1968 Winter Olympics in Grenoble.

Taipale also won the silver medal in the 4 × 10 km relay at the 1966 FIS Nordic World Ski Championships. He finished fifth in the 50 km event at those same games.

== Cross-country skiing results ==
All results are sourced from the International Ski Federation (FIS).

=== Olympic Games ===
- 1 medal – (1 bronze)

| Year | Age | 15 km | 30 km | 50 km | 4 × 10 km relay |
|---|---|---|---|---|---|
| 1968 | 27 | DNF | — | 14 | Bronze |
| 1972 | 31 | — | — | 12 | 5 |

=== World Championships ===
- 1 medal – (1 silver)

| Year | Age | 15 km | 30 km | 50 km | 4 × 10 km relay |
|---|---|---|---|---|---|
| 1966 | 25 | 7 | — | 5 | Silver |
