= Fernand Borrel =

French cross-country skier (born 1939)

Personal information
- Nationality: French
- Born: 21 April 1939 (age 85)

Sport
- Sport: Cross-country skiing

Fernand Borrel (born 21 April 1939) is a French cross-country skier. He competed in the men's 50 kilometre event at the 1968 Winter Olympics.
