= Gert-Dietmar Klause =

East German cross-country skier

Medal record

Men's cross-country skiing

Representing East Germany

Olympic Games
Silver medal – second place	1976 Innsbruck	50 km

World Championships
Gold medal – first place	1974 Falun	4 × 10 km relay
Silver medal – second place	1970 Vysoké Tatry	4 × 10 km relay

Gert-Dietmar Klause (born 25 March 1945) is a former East German cross-country skier who competed at three Olympic Games from 1968 to 1976. He won a silver medal in the 50 km at the 1976 Winter Olympics in Innsbruck.

Klause won two medals in the 4 x 10 km relay at the FIS Nordic World Ski Championships (gold: 1974, silver: 1970.) His best individual finish was a 4th in the 15 km in 1970.

In 1975, he won Vasaloppet as the first and only East German winner.

== Cross-country skiing results ==
All results are sourced from the International Ski Federation (FIS).

=== Olympic Games ===
- 1 medal – (1 silver)

Year	Age	15 km	30 km	50 km	4 × 10 km relay
1968	22	33	19	25	7
1972	26	13	8	9	6
1976	30	9	6	Silver	DNF

=== World Championships ===
- 2 medals – (1 gold, 1 silver)

Year	Age	15 km	30 km	50 km	4 × 10 km relay
1970	24	4	5	—	Silver
1974	28	—	—	—	Gold
1978	32	29	20	25	8
