= Gerhard Grimmer =

East German cross-country skier (1943–2023)

Personal information
- Born: 6 April 1943 Katharinaberg, Sudetenland, Nazi Germany
- Died: 9 October 2023 (aged 80) Floh-Seligenthal, Thuringia, Germany
Medal record
Men's cross-country skiing
Representing East Germany
World Championships
Gold medal – first place	1974 Falun	50 km
Gold medal – first place	1974 Falun	4 × 10 km relay
Silver medal – second place	1970 Vysoké Tatry	30 km
Silver medal – second place	1970 Vysoké Tatry	4 × 10 km relay
Silver medal – second place	1974 Falun	15 km
Bronze medal – third place	1970 Vysoké Tatry	50 km

Gerhard Grimmer (6 April 1943 – 9 October 2023) was an East German cross-country skier who competed during the 1960s and 1970s. He won several medals at the FIS Nordic World Ski Championships, including golds in the 50 km and the 4 × 10 km relay (both in 1974); silvers in the 30 km (1970), 4 × 10 km relay (1970), and 15 km (1974); and a bronze in the 50 km (1970). Grimmer also won the Holmenkollen ski festival at 50 km twice (1970–71). He competed at three Olympics (1968, 1972, and 1976) and his best Olympic finish was fifth at the 1976 Winter Olympics in Innsbruck in the 50 km.

In 1975, he was awarded the Holmenkollen medal, sharing it with Oddvar Brå and Ivar Formo.

Grimmer died on 9 October 2023, at the age of 80.

== Cross-country skiing results ==
All results are sourced from the International Ski Federation (FIS).

=== Olympic Games ===
Year	Age	15 km	30 km	50 km	4 × 10 km relay
1968	24	29	15	DNS	7
1972	28	—	—	—	6
1976	32	49	16	5	DNF

=== World Championships ===
- 6 medals – (2 gold, 3 silver, 1 bronze)

Year	Age	15 km	30 km	50 km	4 × 10 km relay
1966	22	—	—	9	9
1970	26	—	Silver	Bronze	Silver
1974	30	Silver	6	Gold	Gold

== Sources ==
- Gerhard Grimmer at the International Ski and Snowboard Federation
- – click Holmenkollmedaljen for downloadable pdf file (in Norwegian)
- – click Vinnere for downloadable pdf file (in Norwegian)
