= Harald Grønningen =

Norwegian cross-country skier

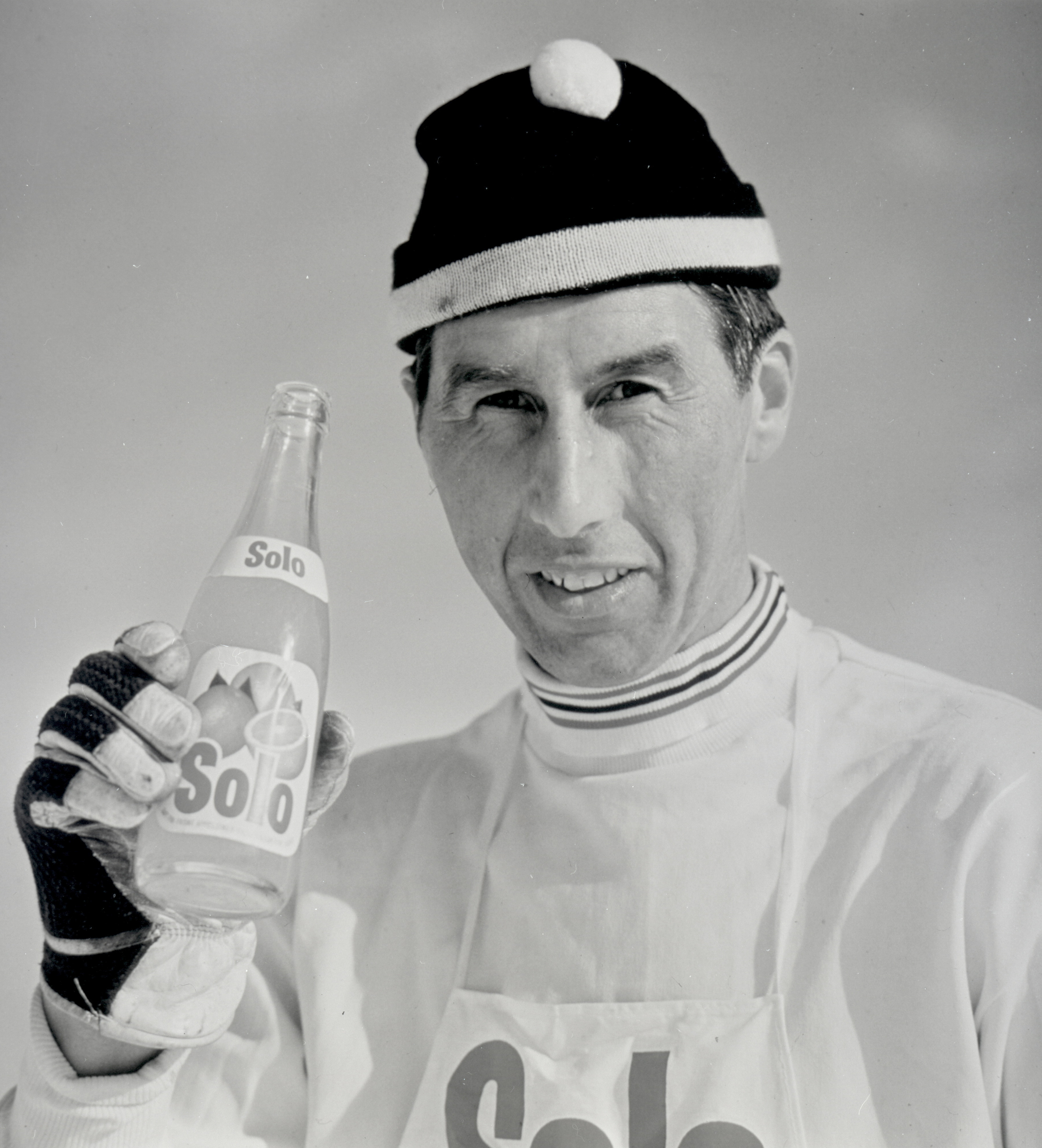
- Grønningen in 1970

Personal information
- Born: 9 October 1934 Lensvik, Norway
- Died: 26 August 2016 (aged 81) Lensvik, Norway

Sport
- Country: Norway
- Sport: Cross-country skiing Athletics
Medal record
Men's cross-country skiing
Representing Norway
Olympic Games
Gold medal – first place	1968 Grenoble	15 km
Gold medal – first place	1968 Grenoble	4 × 10 km relay
Silver medal – second place	1960 Squaw Valley	4 × 10 km relay
Silver medal – second place	1964 Innsbruck	15 km
Silver medal – second place	1964 Innsbruck	30 km
World Championships
Gold medal – first place	1966 Oslo	4 × 10 km relay
Silver medal – second place	1962 Zakopane	15 km

Harald Grønningen (9 October 1934 – 26 August 2016) was a Norwegian cross-country skier who competed during the 1960s, earning five winter olympic and two world championship medals. He also won nine Norwegian championship titles and received the King's cup in 1963 and 1967. Grønningen won the 15 km twice (1960 and 1961) at the Holmenkollen ski festival and earned the Holmenkollen medal in 1961.

Grønningen was born in Lensvik. He was also an able long-distance runner. His personal best times were 15:03.2 minutes in the 5000 metres, achieved in September 1963 at Trondheim stadion, and 31:04.6 minutes in the 10,000 metres, achieved in September 1961 at the same stadium. He represented the club Lensvik IL.

== Cross-country skiing results ==
All results are sourced from the International Ski Federation (FIS).

=== Olympic Games ===
- 5 medals – (2 gold, 3 silver)

Year	Age	15 km	30 km	50 km	4 × 10 km relay
1960	25	11	—	14	Silver
1964	29	Silver	Silver	6	4
1968	33	Gold	13	—	Gold

=== World Championships ===
- 4 medals – (1 gold, 1 silver, 2 bronze)

Year	Age	15 km	30 km	50 km	4 × 10 km relay
1958	23	21	—	—	—
1962	27	Silver	4	5	4
1966	31	—	7	7	Gold
1970	35	9	—	DNF	4
