= Eero Mäntyranta =

Finnish cross-country skier (1937–2013)

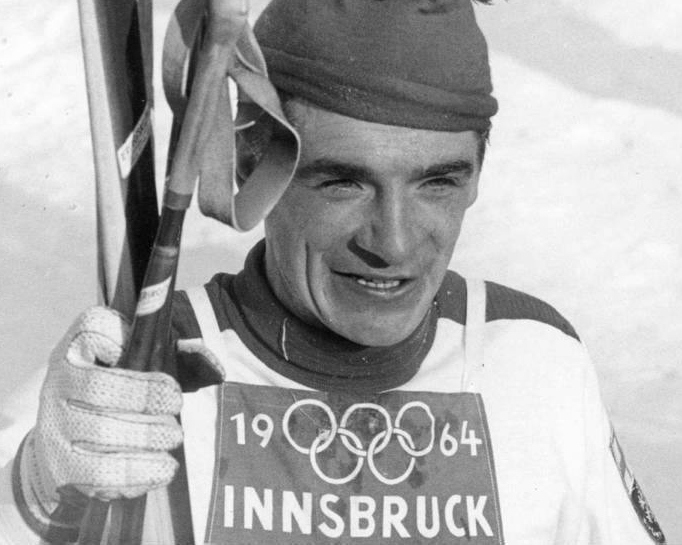
- Mäntyranta at the 1964 Olympics

Personal information
- Full name: Eero Antero Mäntyranta
- Born: 20 November 1937 Turtola, Lapland, Finland
- Died: 30 December 2013 (aged 76) Oulu, Northern Ostrobothnia, Finland
- Height: 170 cm (5 ft 7 in)

Sport
- Sport: Skiing
- Club: Pellon Ponsi
Medal record
Men's cross-country skiing
Representing Finland
Olympic Games
Gold medal – first place	1960 Squaw Valley	4 × 10 km relay
Gold medal – first place	1964 Innsbruck	15 km
Gold medal – first place	1964 Innsbruck	30 km
Silver medal – second place	1964 Innsbruck	4 × 10 km relay
Silver medal – second place	1968 Grenoble	15 km
Bronze medal – third place	1968 Grenoble	30 km
Bronze medal – third place	1968 Grenoble	4 × 10 km relay
World Championships
Gold medal – first place	1962 Zakopane	30 km
Gold medal – first place	1966 Oslo	30 km
Silver medal – second place	1962 Zakopane	4 × 10 km relay
Silver medal – second place	1966 Oslo	4 × 10 km relay
Bronze medal – third place	1966 Oslo	50 km

Eero Antero Mäntyranta (20 November 1937 – 30 December 2013) was one of the most successful Finnish cross-country skiers. He competed in four Winter Olympics (1960–1972) winning seven medals at three of them. His performance at the 1964 Winter Olympics earned him the nickname "Mister Seefeld", referring to the venue where the cross-country skiing and biathlon competitions took place. The Finnish Ministry of Education endowed him with the Pro Urheilu letter of recognition in 2000. There is also a museum centered on Mäntyranta in his birthplace of Pello.

== Genetics and doping ==
Mäntyranta had primary familial and congenital polycythemia (PFCP) causing an increase in red blood cell mass and hemoglobin due to a mutation in the erythropoietin receptor (EPOR) gene, which was identified following a DNA study that found the mutation in a high proportion of members of his extended family, as reported in 1993. The elevated hematocrit caused by the condition increases the ability of the blood to transport oxygen; the EPOR mutation is speculated to have contributed to Mäntyranta's remarkable endurance.

In 1972 Mäntyranta tested positive for amphetamine at a Finnish competition, becoming the first of his countrymen known to be caught doping. He later admitted taking hormones, which were not yet prohibited.

== Cross-country skiing results ==
All results are sourced from the International Ski Federation (FIS).

=== Olympic Games ===
- 7 medals – (3 gold, 2 silver, 2 bronze)

Year	Age	15 km	30 km	50 km	4 × 10 km relay
1960	22	6	—	—	Gold
1964	26	Gold	Gold	9	Silver
1968	30	Silver	Bronze	15	Bronze
1972	34	—	19	DNF	—

=== World Championships ===
- 5 medals – (2 gold, 2 silver, 1 bronze)

Year	Age	15 km	30 km	50 km	4 × 10 km relay
1962	24	5	Gold	—	Silver
1966	28	6	Gold	Bronze	Silver

== Accomplishments ==
- National domestic championships: five gold, two silver and two bronze
- Holmenkollen ski festival championships first place 1962, 1964 and 1968 (15 km)
- Holmenkollen medal in 1964 (Shared with Veikko Kankkonen, Georg Thoma, and Halvor Næs.).
- Salpausselkä games win 1964 and 1972.

== See also ==
- Athletes of Finland
- Olympic Athletes of Finland
