= Tom Dakin =

British cross-country skier (born 1943)

Personal information
- Nationality: British
- Born: 30 January 1943 (age 82); Battle, England

Sport
- Sport: Cross-country skiing

Tom Dakin (born 30 January 1943) is a British cross-country skier. He competed in the men's 15 kilometre event at the 1968 Winter Olympics.
