= Assar Rönnlund =

Swedish cross-country skier (1935–2011)

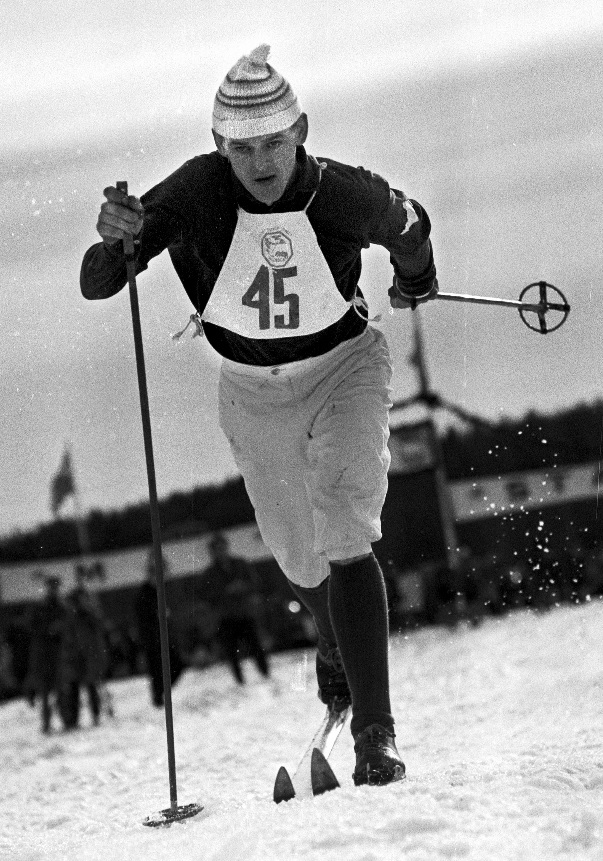
- Rönnlund at the 1961 Swedish National Championships

Personal information
- Full name: Bernt Assar Rönnlund
- Born: 3 September 1935 Sävar, Sweden
- Died: 5 January 2011 (aged 75) Umeå, Sweden
- Height: 177 cm (5 ft 10 in)

Sport
- Sport: Skiing
- Club: IFK Umeå
Medal record
Men's cross-country skiing
Representing Sweden
Event	1st	2nd	3rd
Olympic Games	1	2	0
World Championships	2	1	0
Total	3	3	0
Olympic Games
Gold medal – first place	1964 Innsbruck	4 × 10 km relay
Silver medal – second place	1964 Innsbruck	50 km
Silver medal – second place	1968 Grenoble	4 × 10 km relay
World Championships
Gold medal – first place	1962 Zakopane	15 km
Gold medal – first place	1962 Zakopane	4 × 10 km relay
Silver medal – second place	1962 Zakopane	50 km

Bernt Assar Rönnlund (3 September 1935 – 5 January 2011) was a Swedish cross-country skier. Rönnlund's biggest success was at the 1962 FIS Nordic World Ski Championships in Zakopane where he won two gold medals (15 km and 4 × 10 km) and a silver (50 km). As a result, he earned the Svenska Dagbladet Gold Medal that year for his championship successes. Rönnlund was the anchorman of the Swedish 4 × 10 km relay team at the 1964 Winter Olympics in Innsbruck, bringing the team from fourth place to victory. Rönnlund also won the Vasaloppet in 1967 and the 50 km event at the Holmenkollen ski festival twice (1962 and 1968). For his cross-country skiing successes, Rönnlund was awarded the Holmenkollen Medal in 1968 (shared with King Olav V, Gjermund Eggen and Bjørn Wirkola).

After retiring from active competition he was hired in 1972 by The Swedish Radio Corporation as a cross-country skiing commentator. He gained nationwide popularity working in a duo with Åke Strömmer. Rönnlund retired from broadcasting after the 2003 FIS Nordic World Ski Championships.

Rönnlund was married to Inga-Britt Rönnlund and they had three sons, Michael, Lars and Tommy Rönnlund. Later he married Toini Gustafsson, a 1967 Holmenkollen medalist; they had two children together, plus one from the previous marriage of Gustafsson. They became the second husband-wife team to earn this honor. They are also the only husband-wife team to ever win the Svenska Dagbladet Gold Medal with Gustafsson earning the honor in 1968.

Rönnlund died on 5 January 2011 after a period of illness.

== Cross-country skiing results ==
All results are sourced from the International Ski Federation (FIS).

=== Olympic Games ===
- 3 medals – (1 gold, 2 silver)

Year	Age	15 km	30 km	50 km	4 × 10 km relay
1960	24	—	—	12	—
1964	28	13	7	Silver	Gold
1968	32	11	—	10	Silver

=== World Championships ===
- 3 medals – (2 gold, 1 silver)

Year	Age	15 km	30 km	50 km	4 × 10 km relay
1962	26	Gold	6	Silver	Gold

Preceded by Ove Fundin & Sten Lundin	Svenska Dagbladet Gold Medal; 1962	Succeeded by Jonny Nilsson
