= Walter Failer =

Austrian cross-country skier (born 1946)

Personal information
- Nationality: Austrian
- Born: 31 December 1946 (age 78); Schaz, Austria

Sport
- Sport: Cross-country skiing

Walter Failer (born 31 December 1946) is an Austrian cross-country skier. He competed in the men's 15 kilometre event at the 1968 Winter Olympics.
