= Ernst Pühringer =

Austrian cross-country skier

Personal information
- Nationality: Austrian
- Born: 6 August 1944 (age 81) Hagenberg im Mühlkreis, Nazi Germany

Sport
- Sport: Cross-country skiing

Ernst Pühringer (born 6 August 1944) is an Austrian cross-country skier. He competed in multiple cross country skiing events including the 15km, 30km and the 10km relay at the 1968 Winter Olympics.
