= Oddvar Brå =

Norwegian cross-country skier

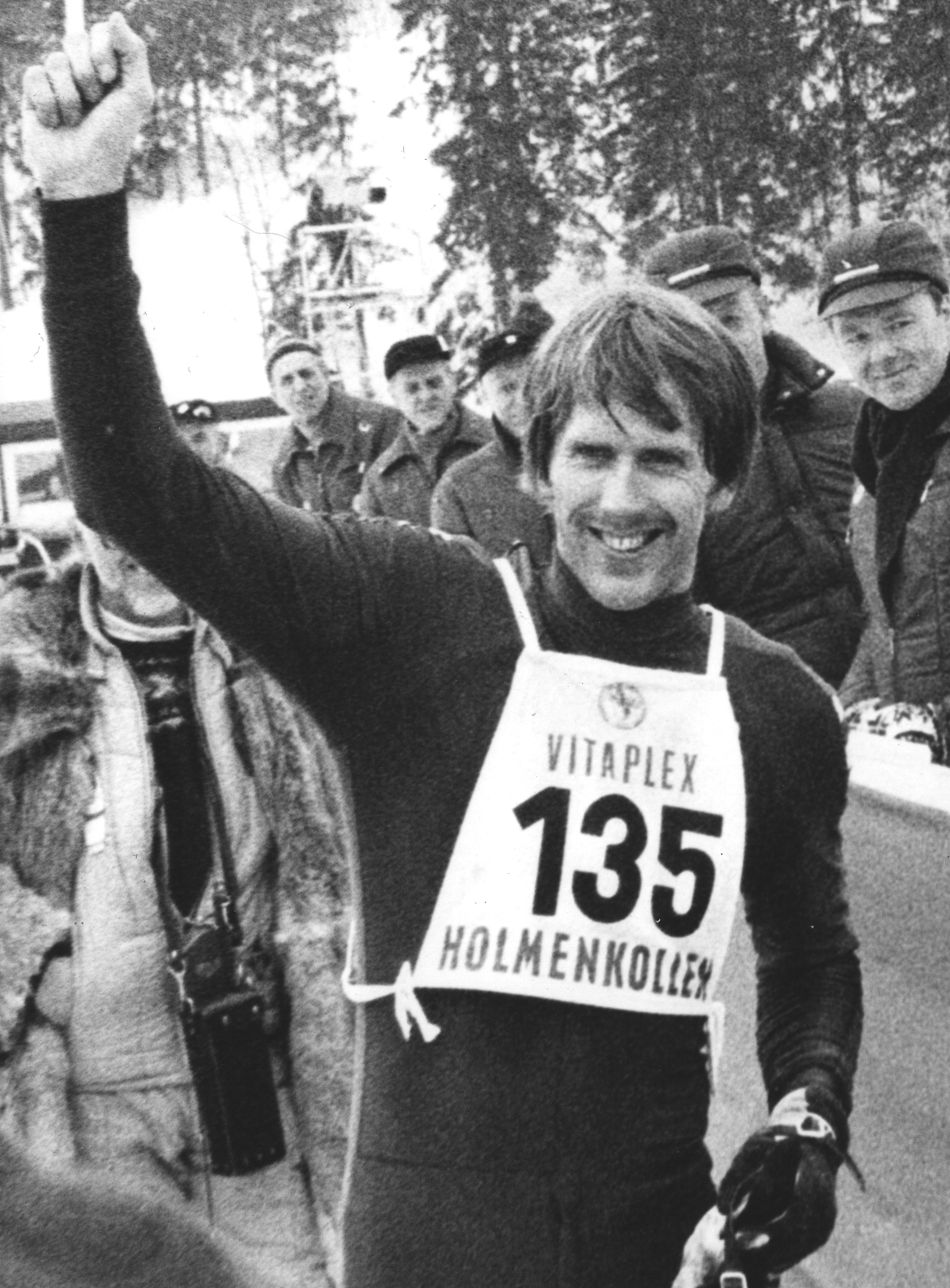
- Oddvar Brå in March, 1980

Personal information
- Nationality: Norway
- Born: 16 March 1951 (age 75) Hølonda Municipality, Norway

Sport
- Sport: Skiing
- Club: IL Leik

World Cup career
- Seasons: 9 – (1982–1989, 1991)
- Indiv. starts: 24
- Indiv. podiums: 4
- Indiv. wins: 2
- Team starts: 2
- Team podiums: 1
- Team wins: 1
- Overall titles: 0 – (5th in 1982)
Medal record
Men's cross-country skiing
Representing Norway
Olympic Games
Silver medal – second place	1972 Sapporo	4 × 10 km relay
Silver medal – second place	1980 Lake Placid	4 × 10 km relay
World Championships
Gold medal – first place	1982 Oslo	15 km
Gold medal – first place	1982 Oslo	4 × 10 km relay
Bronze medal – third place	1974 Falun	4 × 10 km relay
Bronze medal – third place	1978 Lahti	4 × 10 km relay

Oddvar Brå (born 16 March 1951) is a Norwegian former cross-country skier. He was among the best skiers in Norway, the three-times winner of the World Cup (1972–73, then named "World ranking", 1974–75 and 1978–79) and the winner of 16 national championships. His success in the major international championships was more modest.

== Career ==
Brå participated in the 1972 Winter Olympics and the 1991 Holmenkollen ski festival, but his first individual major international win was at the 1982 FIS Nordic World Ski Championships in Oslo, where he won the 15 km event. In this championship, he also tied for the gold medal with Alexander Zavyalov of the Soviet Union in the relay after a dramatic finish in which his pole broke. This event remained in the memory of most Norwegians, leading to the popular all-Norwegian expression "Hvor var du da Brå brakk staven?" ("Where were you when Brå's pole broke?").

Brå also won three relay medals at the FIS Nordic World Ski Championships with a gold in 1982 and bronzes in 1974 and 1978. Brå additionally won two silver medals in the 4 × 10 km relay at the 1972 Winter Olympics and the 1980 Winter Olympics, the 15 km at the Holmenkollen ski festival in 1980 and 1982, and the 50 km in 1975, 1979, and 1981. In 1975, Brå was awarded the Holmenkollen medal (shared with Gerhard Grimmer and Ivar Formo).

Brå's best individual achievement in the Olympics was a fourth place in the 15 km event in the 1988 Winter Olympics in Calgary. He received the Egebergs Ærespris in 1987 for his accomplishments in cross-country skiing and athletics.

== Cross-country skiing results ==
All results are sourced from the International Ski Federation (FIS).

=== Olympic Games ===
- 2 medals – (2 silver)

Year	Age	15 km	30 km	50 km	4 × 10 km relay
1972	21	9	—	—	Silver
1976	25	—	19	DNF	—
1980	29	9	12	7	Silver
1984	33	—	32	—	—
1988	37	4	—	—	6

=== World Championships ===
- 4 medals – (2 gold, 2 bronze)

Year	Age	15 km classical	15 km freestyle	30 km	50 km	4 × 10 km relay
1974	23	5	—N/a	9	9	Bronze
1978	27	—	—N/a	9	—	Bronze
1982	31	Gold	—N/a	—	10	Gold
1985	34	18	—N/a	—	—	—
1987	36	—	—N/a	—	—	16
1989	38	9	—	—	—	—

=== World Cup ===
==== Season standings ====
Season	Age	Overall
1982	31	5
1983	32	15
1984	33	15
1985	34	36
1986	35	24
1987	36	NC
1988	37	13
1989	38	30
1991	40	NC

==== Individual podiums ====
- 2 victories
- 4 podiums

No.	Season	Date	Location	Race	Level	Place
1	1981–82	23 February 1982	Oslo, Norway	15 km Individual	World Championships^{[1]}	1st
2	1981–82	7 March 1982	Lahti, Finland	50 km Individual	World Cup	1st
3	1983–84	17 March 1984	Fairbanks, United States	15 km Individual	World Cup	3rd
4	1987–88	27 March 1988	Rovaniemi, Finland	50 km Individual C	World Cup	2nd

==== Team podiums ====
- 1 victory
- 1 podium

No.	Season	Date	Location	Race	Level	Place	Teammates
1	1981–82	25 February 1982	Oslo, Norway	4 × 10 km Relay	World Championships^{[1]}	1st	Eriksen / Aunli / Mikkelsplass

Note: ^{1} Until the 1999 World Championships, World Championship races were included in the World Cup scoring system.

Preceded by Cato Zahl Pedersen	Egebergs Ærespris; 1987	Succeeded by Ragnhild Bratberg
