= Pål Tyldum =

Norwegian cross-country skier (born 1942)

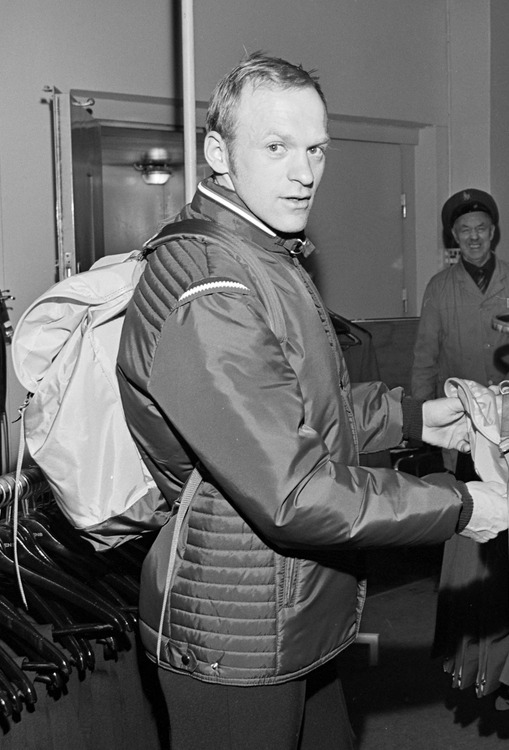

Personal information
- Born: 28 March 1942 (age 84) Høylandet Municipality, Norway
- Height: 180 cm (5 ft 11 in)
- Weight: 76 kg (168 lb)

Sport
- Sport: Cross-country skiing
- Club: Hållingen IL, Høylandet
Medal record
Men's cross-country skiing
Representing Norway
Olympic Games
Gold medal – first place	1968 Grenoble	4 × 10 km relay
Gold medal – first place	1972 Sapporo	50 km
Silver medal – second place	1972 Sapporo	30 km
Silver medal – second place	1972 Sapporo	4 × 10 km relay
Silver medal – second place	1976 Innsbruck	4 × 10 km relay

Pål Bjarne Tyldum (born 28 March 1942) is a retired cross-country skier from Norway. Specializing in the longer distances, he won a gold medal in the 50 km event at the 1972 Winter Olympics in Sapporo. At the 1968 Winter Olympics in Grenoble, he won a gold medal in the 4 × 10 km relay. Additionally, he won three Olympic silver medals and seven national cross-country championships. His best result at the world championships was fourth place in the 30 km and 4 × 10 km relay in 1970.

Tyldum won the 50 km event at the Holmenkollen ski festival twice (1969 and 1972). He received the Holmenkollen medal in 1970 and the Sir Thomas Fearnley Cup from the Norwegian Olympic Committee in 1972. He was selected as the Olympic flag bearer for Norway at the 1976 Winter Olympics.

== Life ==
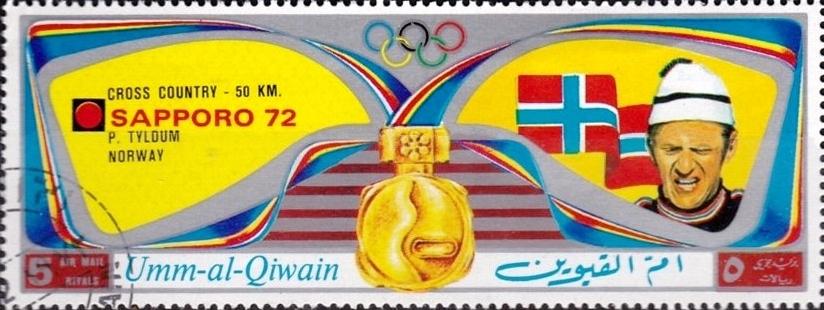
Tyldum on a stamp of Umm al-Quwain

Tyldum grew up in a rural area and in his early years worked as a forester and a surveyor. His brothers Jon, Svein, Kjell and Gunnar were also cross-country skiers, and often competed as a team at the national championships. After retiring from competitions Tyldum returned to his birthplace and became a farmer.

== Cross-country skiing results ==
All results are sourced from the International Ski Federation (FIS).

=== Olympic Games ===
- 5 medals – (2 gold, 3 silver)

Year	Age	15 km	30 km	50 km	4 × 10 km relay
1968	25	7	—	4	Gold
1972	29	—	Silver	Gold	Silver
1976	33	20	—	7	Silver

=== World Championships ===
Year	Age	15 km	30 km	50 km	4 × 10 km relay
1970	27	5	4	11	4
1974	31	—	21	DNF	—
