= Sotoo Okushiba =

Japanese cross-country skier (born 1945)

Personal information
- Nationality: Japanese
- Born: 29 November 1945 (age 79); Hokkaido, Japan

Sport
- Sport: Cross-country skiing

Sotoo Okushiba (奥芝 外雄, Okushiba Sotoo, born 29 November 1945) is a Japanese cross-country skier. He competed in the men's 50 kilometre event at the 1968 Winter Olympics.
