= Klaus Ganter =

German cross-country skier (1945–1969)

Personal information
- Nationality: German
- Born: 10 April 1945; Schluchsee, Germany
- Died: 5 October 1969 (aged 24); Luzern, Switzerland

Sport
- Sport: Cross-country skiing

Klaus Ganter (10 April 1945 – 5 October 1969) was a German cross-country skier. He competed in the men's 15 kilometre event at the 1968 Winter Olympics.
