= Jan Halvarsson =

Swedish cross-country skier (1942–2020)

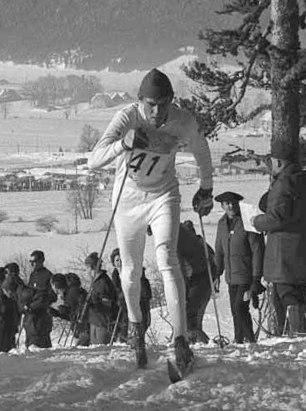
- Halvarsson at the 1968 Olympics

Personal information
- Born: 26 December 1942 Östersund, Sweden
- Died: 5 May 2020 (aged 77) Hammerdal, Sweden
- Height: 182 cm (6 ft 0 in)
- Weight: 73 kg (161 lb)

Sport
- Sport: Cross-country skiing
- Club: Föllinge NS (−1968); Hammerdals IF (1968–)
Medal record
Men's cross-country skiing
Representing Sweden
Olympic Games
Silver medal – second place	1968 Grenoble	4 × 10 km relay
World Championships
Bronze medal – third place	1970 Vysoké Tatry	4 × 10 km relay

Jan Ivar "Janne" Halvarsson (26 December 1942 – 5 May 2020) was a Swedish cross-country skier.

== Career ==
He competed at the 1968 Winter Olympics in the 15, 30, 50 and 4 × 10 km events and won a silver medal in the relay, finishing fifth in the 15 km and seventh in the 50 km. He won a bronze medal in the 4 × 10 km relay at the 1970 FIS Nordic World Ski Championships.

During his skiing career Halvarsson was known for his waxing skills. Therefore, after retiring he was invited to cover this area at the Swedish national team, but left after quarrels with the skiing federation. He later ran a joiner’s workshop in Hammerdal.

Halvarsson died on 5 May 2020, aged 77.

== Cross-country skiing results ==
All results are sourced from the International Ski Federation (FIS).

=== Olympic Games ===
- 1 medal – (1 silver)

Year	Age	15 km	30 km	50 km	4 × 10 km relay
1968	25	5	12	7	Silver

=== World Championships ===
- 1 medal – (1 bronze)

Year	Age	15 km	30 km	50 km	4 × 10 km relay
1966	23	—	—	8	—
1970	27	—	—	—	Bronze
