= Charles Kellogg (cross-country skier) =

American cross-country skier (1940–2015)

Personal information
- Born: January 12, 1940 Boston, Massachusetts, United States
- Died: September 21, 2015 (aged 75) Manchester, Massachusetts, United States

Sport
- Sport: Cross-country skiing

Charles Kellogg (January 12, 1940 – September 21, 2015) was an American cross-country skier. He competed in the men's 30 kilometre event at the 1968 Winter Olympics.
