= Kalevi Laurila =

Finnish cross-country skier

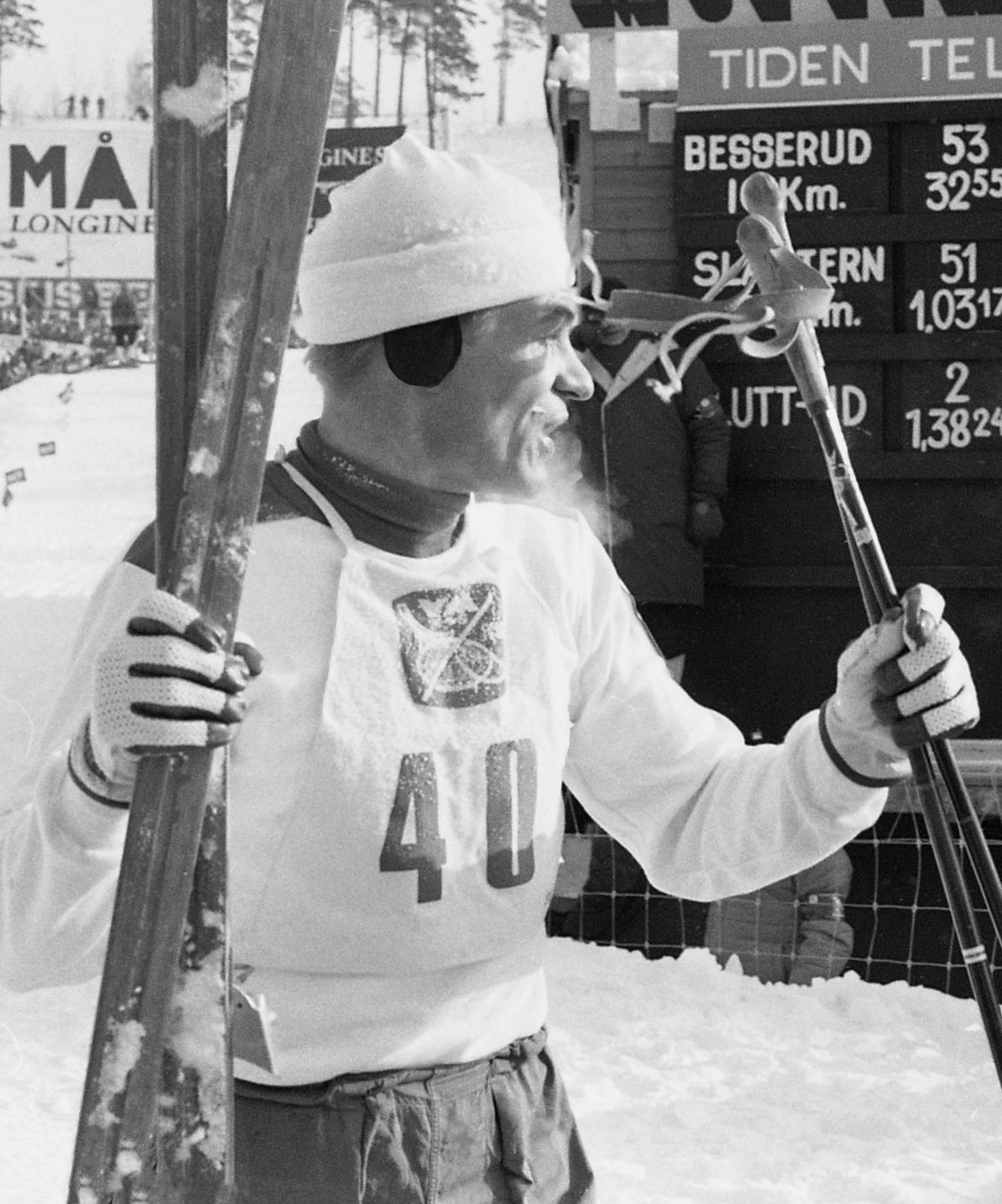
- Laurila at the 1966 World Championships

Personal information
- Born: 5 December 1937 Sääksmäki, Finland
- Died: 13 April 1991 (aged 53) Kangasala, Finland
- Height: 178 cm (5 ft 10 in)
- Weight: 68 kg (150 lb)

Sport
- Sport: Cross-country skiing
- Club: Tampereen Poliisi-Urheilijat
Medal record
Men's cross-country skiing
Representing Finland
Olympic Games
Silver medal – second place	1964 Innsbruck	4 × 10 km relay
Bronze medal – third place	1968 Grenoble	4 × 10 km relay
World Championships
Silver medal – second place	1962 Zakopane	4 × 10 km relay
Silver medal – second place	1966 Oslo	30 km
Silver medal – second place	1966 Oslo	4 × 10 km relay

Kalevi Laurila (5 December 1937 – 13 April 1991) was a Finnish cross-country skier. He competed in all cross-country skiing events at the 1964 and 1968 Olympics and won two medals in the 4 × 10 km relay, placing fourth-eleventh in individual events. At the world championships he won three silver medals, in the 30 km in 1966 and in the 4 × 10 km relay in 1962 and 1966. His last international competition was the 1974 World Championships, where his relay team finished fourth. Domestically he won seven titles, in the 15 km (1967–68, 1970 and 1974), 30 km (1966 and 1968) and 50 km (1967).

Laurila was a decorated police sergeant. Besides skiing, he competed in rowing and biathlon, winning a silver medal in 1973 and a bronze in 1978 at the European Police Championships. In rowing he won the 1967 national title in coxless fours.

== Cross-country skiing results ==
All results are sourced from the International Ski Federation (FIS).

=== Olympic Games ===
- 2 medals – (1 silver, 1 bronze)

Year	Age	15 km	30 km	50 km	4 × 10 km relay
1964	26	9	6	—	Silver
1968	30	4	6	11	Bronze

=== World Championships ===
- 3 medals – (3 silver)

Year	Age	15 km	30 km	50 km	4 × 10 km relay
1962	24	—	—	—	Silver
1966	28	5	Silver	—	Silver
1974	36	—	—	—	4
