= Gunnar Larsson (cross-country skier) =

Swedish cross-country skier

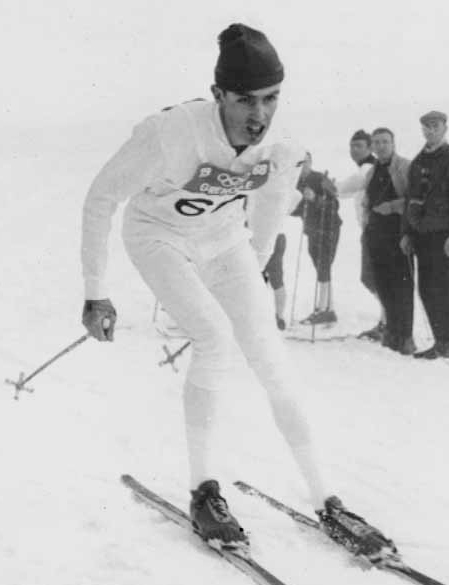
- Larsson at the 1968 Olympics

Personal information
- Born: 1 July 1944 (age 82) Järna, Vansbro, Sweden
- Height: 178 cm (5 ft 10 in)
- Weight: 68 kg (150 lb)

Sport
- Sport: Cross-country skiing
- Club: Hulåns IF, Dala-Järna, Vansbro
Medal record
Men's cross-country skiing
Representing Sweden
Olympic Games
Silver medal – second place	1968 Grenoble	4 × 10 km relay
Bronze medal – third place	1968 Grenoble	15 km

Ål Lars Gunnar "Hulån" Larsson (born 1 July 1944) is a retired Swedish cross-country skier. He competed at the 1968 and 1972 Winter Olympics in the 15, 30, 50 and 4 × 10 km events and won two medals in 1968: a silver in the 4 × 10 km relay and a bronze over 15 km. In 1972 he finished fourth in the relay and 30 km events.

Domestically, Larsson won Swedish titles in the 15 km in 1971 and in the 30 km in 1969. His son Mats also became an Olympic cross-country skier.

== Cross-country skiing results ==
All results are sourced from the International Ski Federation (FIS).

=== Olympic Games ===
- 2 medals – (1 silver, 1 bronze)

Year	Age	15 km	30 km	50 km	4 × 10 km relay
1968	23	Bronze	8	6	Silver
1972	27	8	4	20	4

== See also ==
- List of Olympic medalist families
