= Czechoslovakia at the 1968 Winter Olympics =

- IOC code: TCH
- NOC: Czechoslovak Olympic Committee

in Grenoble
- Competitors: 48 (41 men, 7 women) in 8 sports
- Flag bearer: Jiří Raška (ski jumping)
- Medals Ranked 12th: Gold 1 Silver 2 Bronze 1 Total 4

Winter Olympics appearances (overview)
- 1924; 1928; 1932; 1936; 1948; 1952; 1956; 1960; 1964; 1968; 1972; 1976; 1980; 1984; 1988; 1992

Other related appearances
- Czech Republic (1994–pres.); Slovakia (1994–pres.)

Czechoslovakia competed at the 1968 Winter Olympics in Grenoble, France.

== Medalists ==
Medal	Name	Sport	Event	Date
Gold	Jiří Raška	Ski jumping	Men's normal hill	11 February
Silver	Czechoslovakia men's national ice hockey team: Vladimír Nadrchal; Vladimír Dzurilla; Josef Horešovský; Jan Suchý; Karel Masopust; František Pospíšil; Oldřich Machač; Jozef Golonka; Jan Hrbatý; Václav Nedomanský; Jan Havel; Jaroslav Jiřík; Josef Černý; František Ševčík; Petr Hejma; Jiří Holík; Jiří Kochta; Jan Klapáč	Ice hockey	Men's competition	17 February
Silver	Jiří Raška	Ski jumping	Men's large hill	18 February
Bronze	Hana Maskova	Figure skating	Women's singles	8 February

== Alpine skiing ==
Men

Athlete	Event	Race 1		Race 2		Total	
Athlete	Event	Time	Rank	Time	Rank	Time	Rank
Jaroslav Janda	Downhill					2:07.71	36
Milan Pažout	Downhill					2:07.45	35
Jaroslav Janda	Giant Slalom	1:52.20	41	1:52.07	33	3:44.27	34
Milan Pažout	Giant Slalom	1:48.98	29	1:51.34	29	3:40.32	27

Men's slalom

Athlete	Heat 1		Heat 2		Final					
Athlete	Time	Rank	Time	Rank	Time 1	Rank	Time 2	Rank	Total	Rank
Milan Pažout	DSQ	–	55.96	1 QF	1:02.29	44	DSQ	–	DSQ	–
Jaroslav Janda	53.20	2 QF	–	–	51.62	19	DSQ	–	DSQ	–

Women

Athlete	Event	Race 1		Race 2		Total	
Athlete	Event	Time	Rank	Time	Rank	Time	Rank
Anna Mohrová	Downhill					1:50.22	33
Anna Mohrová	Giant Slalom					DSQ	–
Anna Mohrová	Slalom	46.23	23	49.73	16	1:35.96	18

== Biathlon ==
Men

Event	Athlete	Time	Penalties	Adjusted time ^{1}	Rank
20 km	Ladislav Žižka	1'21:45.3	14	1'35:45.3	55
20 km	Pavel Ploc	1'18:05.0	5	1'23:05.0	15

^{1} One minute added per close miss (a hit in the outer ring), two minutes added per complete miss.

== Cross-country skiing ==
Men

Event	Athlete	Race	
Event	Athlete	Time	Rank
15 km	Václav Peřina	51:06.6	27
15 km	Ján Fajstavr	50:46.5	23
15 km	Karel Štefl	50:15.4	14
30 km	Vít Fousek Jr.	DNF	–
30 km	Václav Peřina	1'40:58.0	24
30 km	Ján Fajstavr	1'40:05.1	22
30 km	Karel Štefl	1'39:25.7	18
50 km	Václav Peřina	DNF	–
50 km	Vít Fousek Jr.	2'45:09.8	39
50 km	Ján Fajstavr	2'39:25.3	28

Men's 4 × 10 km relay

Athletes	Race	
Athletes	Time	Rank
Ján Fajstavr; Vít Fousek Jr. Václav Peřina; Karel Štefl	2'19:51.3	9

== Figure skating ==
Men

Athlete	CF	FS	Points	Places	Rank
Marian Filc	13	8	1734.2	97	10
Ondrej Nepela	5	10	1772.8	73	8

Women

Athlete	CF	FS	Points	Places	Rank
Marie Víchová	20	16	1580.4	187	21
Hana Mašková	4	3	1828.8	31	3rd place, bronze medalist(s)

Pairs

Athletes	SP	FS	Points	Places	Rank
Liana Drahová; Peter Bartosiewicz	11	15	276.8	116	12
Bohunka Šrámková; Jan Šrámek	10	10	285.8	91.5	10

== Ice hockey ==
=== Medal Round ===
Rank	Team	Pld	W	L	T	GF	GA	Pts
1	Soviet Union	7	6	1	0	48	10	12
2	Czechoslovakia (silver)	7	5	1	1	33	17	11
3	Canada	7	5	2	0	28	15	10
4	Sweden	7	4	2	1	23	18	9
5	Finland	7	3	3	1	17	23	7
6	United States	7	2	4	1	23	28	5
7	West Germany	7	1	6	0	13	39	2
8	East Germany	7	0	7	0	13	48	0

Czechoslovakia – (United States) USA 5:1 (1:1, 2:0, 2:0)
Goalscorers: Suchý, Havel, Jiřík, Hejma, Jiří Holík – Volmar.
Referees: Dahlberg, Wiking (SWE)

Czechoslovakia – West Germany 5:1 (1:0, 2:0, 2:1)
Goalscorers: Hrbatý, Golonka, Havel, Hejma, Ševčík – Lax.
Referees: Kubinec, McEvoy (CAN)

Czechoslovakia – Finland 4:3 (0:1, 3:0, 1:2)
Goalscorers: Nedomanský 2, Golonka, Havel – Keinonen, Ketola, Oksanen.
Referees: Wiking (SWE), Snětkov (URS)

Czechoslovakia – East Germany 10:3 (5:2, 1:0, 4:1)
Goalscorers: Horešovský 4, Nedomanský 2, Jiřík, Suchý, Kochta, Ševčík – Karrenbauer, Novy, Peters.
Referees: Dahlberg (SWE), Sillankorva (FIN)

Czechoslovakia – Canada 2:3 (0:0, 0:3, 2:0)
Goalscorers: Havel, Nedomanský – Huck, Bourbonnais, Cadieux.
Referees: Trumble (USA), Sillankorva (FIN)

Czechoslovakia – (Soviet Union) USSR 5:4 (3:1, 1:1, 1:2)
Goalscorers: Ševčík, Hejma, Havel, Golonka, Jiřík – Majorov 2, Blinov, Populanov.
Referees: Trumble (USA), Dahlberg (SWE)

Czechoslovakia – Sweden 2:2 (1:1, 1:0, 0:1)
Goalscorers: Golonka, Hrbatý – Bengtsson, Henriksson.
Referees: Trumble (USA), Sillankorva (FIN)

=== Leading scorers/Awards ===
Rk	Team	GP	G	A	Pts
5th	(Czechoslovakia) Jozef Golonka	7	4	6	10
7th	(Czechoslovakia) Jan Hrbatý	7	2	7	9
10th	(Czechoslovakia) Václav Nedomanský	7	5	2	7

IIHF Award:

Best Defender	(Czechoslovakia) Josef Horešovský

(silver) CZECHOSLOVAKIA
Goaltenders: Vladimír Nadrchal, Vladimír Dzurilla.
Defence: Josef Horešovský, Jan Suchý, Karel Masopust, František Pospíšil, Oldřich Machač.
Forwards: Jozef Golonka, Jan Hrbatý, Václav Nedomanský, Jan Havel, Jaroslav Jiřík, Josef Černý, František Ševčík, Petr Hejma, Jiří Holík, Jiří Kochta, Jan Klapáč.
Coaches: Jaroslav Pitner, Vladimír Kostka.

== Luge ==
Men

Athlete	Run 1		Run 2		Run 3		Total	
Athlete	Time	Rank	Time	Rank	Time	Rank	Time	Rank
Roland Urban	59.20	25	59.59	26	1:00.24	31	2:59.03	27
František Halíř	59.07	23	59.10	18	58.93	19	2:57.10	20
Horst Urban	58.93	19	59.54	25	59.91	27	2:58.38	24
Jan Hamřík	58.43	15	58.56	11	59.07	21	2:56.06	15

(Men's) Doubles

Athletes	Run 1		Run 2		Total	
Athletes	Time	Rank	Time	Rank	Time	Rank
Horst Urban; Roland Urban	50.46	12	50.02	12	1:40.48	12
Jan Hamřík; František Halíř	51.85	14	50.85	14	1:42.10	14

Women

Athlete	Run 1		Run 2		Run 3		Total	
Athlete	Time	Rank	Time	Rank	Time	Rank	Time	Rank
Olina Tylová-Hatlová	50.16	11	50.35	9	51.14	10	2:31.65	11
Dana Spálenská-Beldová	49.22	3	50.36	10	50.77	9	2:30.35	6

== Nordic combined ==
Events:

- normal hill ski jumping (Three jumps, best two counted and shown here.)
- 15 km cross-country skiing

Athlete	Event	Ski Jumping				Cross-country			Total	
Athlete	Event	Distance 1	Distance 2	Points	Rank	Time	Points	Rank	Points	Rank
Tomáš Kučera	Individual	72.0	73.0	217.4	9	50:07.7	216.74	6	434.14	4
Ladislav Rygl	Individual	71.0	71.5	200.4	18	50:55.5	206.88	14	407.28	16

== Ski jumping ==
Athlete	Event	Jump 1		Jump 2		Total	
Athlete	Event	Distance	Points	Distance	Points	Points	Rank
Zbyněk Hubač	Normal hill	74.0	101.7	73.5	101.9	203.6	19
František Rydval	Normal hill	76.0	106.4	73.5	100.4	206.8	12
Ladislav Divila	Normal hill	76.5	107.2	73.0	100.1	207.3	9
Jiří Raška	Normal hill	79.0	115.2	72.5	101.3	216.5	1st place, gold medalist(s)
František Rydval	Large hill	92.0	95.2	88.0	89.6	184.8	27
Zbyněk Hubač	Large hill	95.0	101.4	87.0	87.2	188.6	25
Rudolf Höhnl	Large hill	98.5	107.3	91.5	95.5	202.8	12
Jiří Raška	Large hill	101.0	116.3	98.0	113.1	229.4	2nd place, silver medalist(s)
