= Odd Martinsen =

Norwegian cross-country skier (1942–2025)

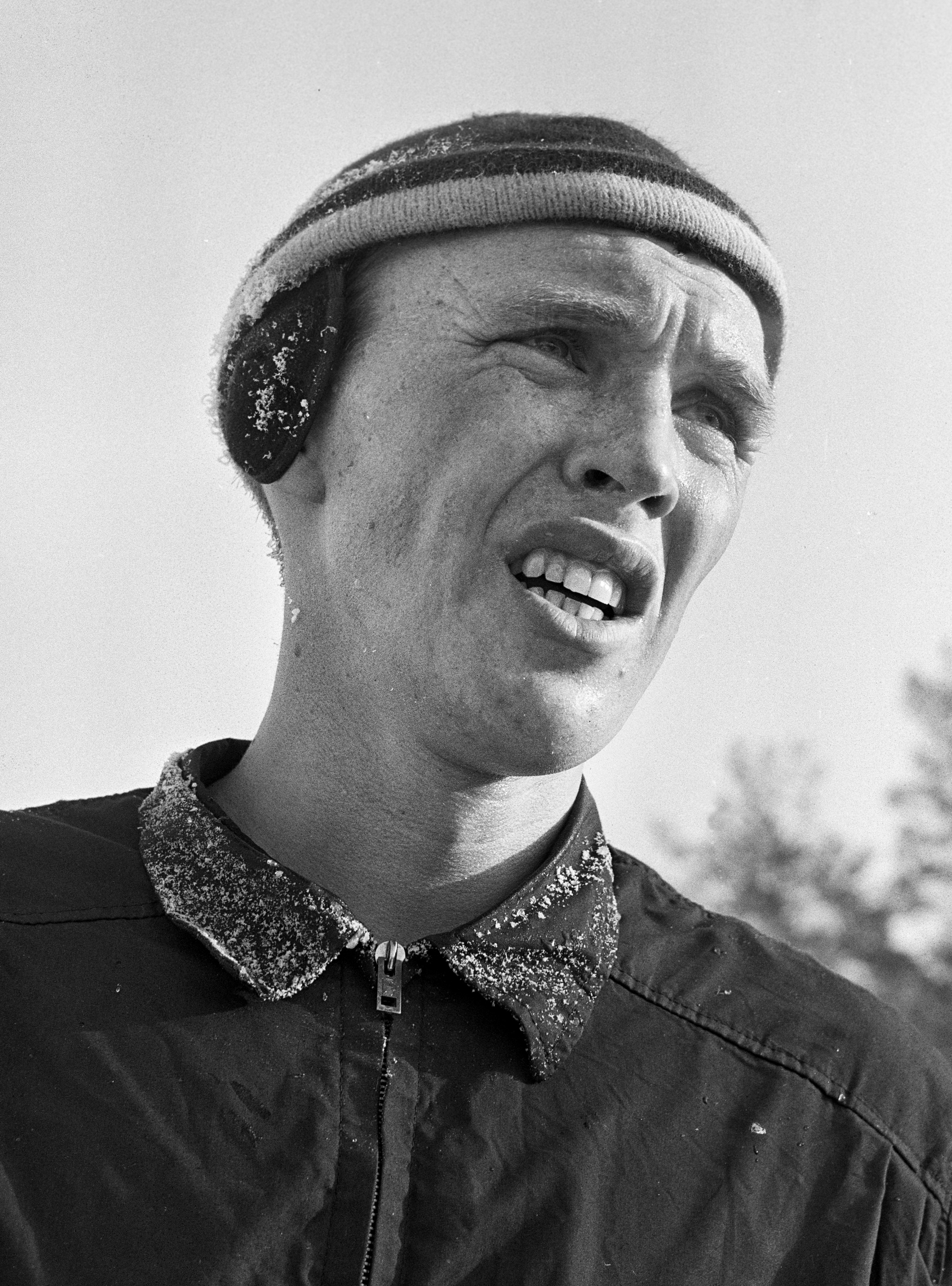
- Martinsen in 1963

Personal information
- Born: 20 December 1942 Drammen, German-occupied Norway
- Died: 27 October 2025 (aged 82)
- Height: 182 cm (6 ft 0 in)
- Weight: 76 kg (168 lb)
- Spouse: Hanne Martinsen (1966–2025)

Sport
- Sport: Cross-country skiing
- Club: Nittedal IL
Medal record
Men's cross-country skiing
Representing Norway
Olympic Games
Gold medal – first place	1968 Grenoble	4 × 10 km relay
Silver medal – second place	1968 Grenoble	30 km
Silver medal – second place	1976 Innsbruck	4 × 10 km relay
World Championships
Gold medal – first place	1966 Oslo	4 × 10 km relay
Silver medal – second place	1970 Vysoké Tatry	15 km
Bronze medal – third place	1966 Oslo	15 km
Bronze medal – third place	1970 Vysoké Tatry	30 km
Bronze medal – third place	1974 Falun	4 × 10 km relay

Odd-Willy Martinsen (20 December 1942 – 27 October 2025) was a Norwegian cross-country skier who competed during the 1960s and 1970s. He won three medals at the Winter Olympics, a gold in the 4 × 10 km relay (1968) and silvers in the 30 km (1968) and the 4 × 10 km relay (1976). Martinsen won five medals at the FIS Nordic World Ski Championships, a gold in the 4 × 10 km relay (1966), a silver in the 15 km (1970), and bronzes in the 15 km (1966), 30 km (1970), and 4 × 10 km relay (1974). At the 1969 Holmenkollen ski festival, he won the 15 km race. For his cross-country skiing successes in Norway and abroad, Martinsen received the Holmenkollen medal in 1969. Thirty-two years later, his daughter, Bente Skari, received the Holmenkollen medal, making them the only father-daughter combination to ever win the prestigious honor.

Domestically Martinsen won Norwegian titles in the 15 km (1966, 1970), 30 km (1969, 1971) and 4 × 10 km relay (1970, 1972–1975, 1978). After retiring from competitions he became a skiing official and headed the FIS cross-country committee in 1986–2002. At the 1994 Winter Olympics in Lillehammer, he served as chief of the cross-country skiing competitions. He also founded the ski firm Finor AS, which, as of 2020, is run by his son, Harald.

Martinsen died on 27 October 2025, at the age of 82.

== Cross-country skiing results ==
All results are sourced from the International Ski Federation (FIS).

=== Olympic Games ===
- 3 medals – (1 gold, 2 silver)

Year	Age	15 km	30 km	50 km	4 × 10 km relay
1968	25	8	Silver	18	Gold
1976	33	8	9	—	Silver

=== World Championships ===
- 5 medals – (1 gold, 1 silver, 3 bronze)

Year	Age	15 km	30 km	50 km	4 × 10 km relay
1966	23	Bronze	—	—	Gold
1970	27	Silver	Bronze	—	4
1974	31	33	—	—	Bronze
1978	35	27	—	—	—
