= Yugoslavia at the 1968 Winter Olympics =

- Flag of SFR Yugoslavia
- IOC code: YUG (JUG used at these Games)
- NOC: Yugoslav Olympic Committee

in Grenoble
- Competitors: 30 (29 men, 1 woman) in 4 sports
- Medals: Gold 0 Silver 0 Bronze 0 Total 0

Winter Olympics appearances (overview)
- 1924; 1928; 1932; 1936; 1948; 1952; 1956; 1960; 1964; 1968; 1972; 1976; 1980; 1984; 1988; 1992; 1994; 1998; 2002

Other related appearances
- Croatia (1992–pres.); Slovenia (1992–pres.); Bosnia and Herzegovina (1994–pres.); North Macedonia (1998–pres.); Serbia and Montenegro (1998–2006); Montenegro (2010–pres.); Serbia (2010–pres.); Kosovo (2018–pres.)

Athletes from the Socialist Federal Republic of Yugoslavia competed at the 1968 Winter Olympics in Grenoble, France.

== Alpine skiing ==
Men

Athlete	Event	Race 1		Race 2		Total	
Athlete	Event	Time	Rank	Time	Rank	Time	Rank
Blaž Jakopič	Downhill					2:11.00	51
Jože Gazvoda	Downhill					2:10.51	47
Andrej Klinar	Downhill					2:09.61	41
Jože Gazvoda	Giant Slalom	1:58.26	62	1:58.89	59	3:57.15	58
Andrej Klinar	Giant Slalom	1:55.89	56	1:56.94	49	3:52.83	52
Blaž Jakopič	Giant Slalom	1:53.77	49	1:54.77	42	3:48.54	43

Men's slalom

Athlete	Heat 1		Heat 2		Final					
Athlete	Time	Rank	Time	Rank	Time 1	Rank	Time 2	Rank	Total	Rank
Jože Gazvoda	DSQ	–	59.82	3	did not advance					
Andrej Klinar	58.16	4	59.36	2	did not advance					
Blaž Jakopič	57.17	3	55.07	1 QF	54.26	37	1:03.22	31	1:57.48	28

Women

Athlete	Event	Race 1		Race 2		Total	
Athlete	Event	Time	Rank	Time	Rank	Time	Rank
Majda Ankele	Downhill					1:52.13	36
Majda Ankele	Giant Slalom					2:02.44	29
Majda Ankele	Slalom	43.33	13	48.27	10	1:31.60	12

== Cross-country skiing ==
Men

Event	Athlete	Race	
Event	Athlete	Time	Rank
15 km	Mirko Bavče	53:10.7	45
15 km	Janez Mlinar	52:54.4	43
15 km	Alojz Kerštajn	52:31.7	40
30 km	Mirko Bavče	1'47:48.9	49
30 km	Janez Mlinar	1'46:43.2	47
30 km	Alojz Kerštajn	1'46:09.5	44
50 km	Janez Mlinar	DNF	–
50 km	Alojz Kerštajn	2'43:54.1	35

== Ice hockey ==
=== First round ===
Finland - (Socialist Federal Republic of Yugoslavia) Yugoslavia 11:2 (3:0, 6:0, 2:2)
Goalscorers: Lasse Oksanen 2, Esa Peltonen 2, Matti Reunamaki 2, Juhani Wahlsten, Veli-Pekka Ketola, Matti Keinonen, Matti Harju, Pekka Leimu - Albin Felc, Franc Smolej.

=== Consolation Round ===
Teams in this group play for 9th-14th places.

Rank	Team	Pld	W	L	T	GF	GA	Pts
9	Yugoslavia	5	5	0	0	33	9	10
10	Japan	5	4	1	0	27	12	8
11	Norway	5	3	2	0	15	15	6
12	Romania	5	2	3	0	22	23	4
13	Austria	5	1	4	0	12	27	2
14	France	5	0	5	0	9	32	0

(Socialist Federal Republic of Yugoslavia) Yugoslavia – Japan 5:1 (2:0, 0:0, 3:1)
Goalscorers: Tisler 2, Beravs, Felc, Mlakar – Iwamoto.

(Socialist Federal Republic of Yugoslavia) Yugoslavia – Austria 6:0 (2:0, 2:0, 2:0)
Goalscorers: Ivo Jan 3, Roman Smolej, Tisler, Klinar.

France – (Socialist Federal Republic of Yugoslavia) Yugoslavia 1:10 (0:6, 0:1, 1:3)
Goalscorers: Itzicsohn – Tisler 3, Ivo Jan 2, Felc 2, Beravs, Roman Smolej, Hiti.

(Socialist Federal Republic of Yugoslavia) Yugoslavia – Romania 9:5 (5:3, 1:1, 3:1)
Goalscorers: Roman Smolej 2, Tisler 2, Felc 2, Ivo Jan, Hiti, Jug – Iuliu Szabo 2, Tekei, Florescu, Geza Szabo.

(Socialist Federal Republic of Yugoslavia) Yugoslavia – Norway 3:2 (1:1, 0:0, 2:1)
Goalscorers: Hiti, Franz Smolej, Ivo Jan - Dalsören, Bjölbak.

=== Contestants ===
9. YUGOSLAVIA
Goaltenders: Anton Jože Gale, Rudolf Knez.
Defence: Franc-Rado Razinger, Ivo Jan, Ivan Rataj, Viktor Ravnik, Lado Jug.
Forwards: Franc Smolej, Bogomir Jan, Boris Renaud, Albin Felc, Viktor Tišler, Rudi Hiti, Slavko Beravs, Miroslav Gojanovič, Roman Smolej, Janez Mlakar, Ciril Klinar.

== Ski jumping ==
Athlete	Event	Jump 1		Jump 2		Total	
Athlete	Event	Distance	Points	Distance	Points	Points	Rank
Peter Eržen	Normal hill	73.0 (fall)	67.6	70.5	95.6	163.2	51
Marjan Mesec	Normal hill	73.5	96.9	69.0	88.2	170.1	46
Marjan Pečar	Normal hill	76.5	104.7	61.0	65.4	185.1	38
Ludvik Zajc	Normal hill	76.5	106.2	71.5	99.2	205.4	14
Marjan Pečar	Large hill	91.0	93.8	81.5	79.0	172.8	39
Peter Štefančić	Large hill	94.0	94.0	85.0	79.4	173.4	38
Peter Eržen	Large hill	96.0	103.8	87.5 (fall)	57.9	161.7	44
Ludvik Zajc	Large hill	96.5	104.0	93.5	99.8	203.8	9
