= Yun Jong-im =

South Korean cross-country skier

Personal information
- Nationality: South Korean
- Born: 5 January 1943 (age 82); Pyeongchang, South Korea

Sport
- Sport: Cross-country skiing

Yun Jong-im (born 5 January 1943) is a South Korean cross-country skier. He competed in the men's 15 kilometre event at the 1968 Winter Olympics.
