= Miklós Holló =

Hungarian cross-country skier (born 1943)

Personal information
- Nationality: Hungarian
- Born: 17 October 1943 (age 81); Jászberény, Hungary

Sport
- Sport: Cross-country skiing

Miklós Holló (born 17 October 1943) is a Hungarian cross-country skier. He competed in the men's 15 kilometre event at the 1968 Winter Olympics.
