= Helmut Gerlach =

German cross-country skier (1937–2020)

Personal information
- Nationality: German
- Born: 7 June 1937; Jugowice, Poland
- Died: 1 June 2020 (aged 82)

Sport
- Sport: Cross-country skiing

Helmut Gerlach (7 June 1937 – 1 June 2020) was a German cross-country skier. He competed in the men's 15 kilometre event at the 1968 Winter Olympics.
