= Flury Koch =

Swiss cross-country skier (born 1945)

Personal information
- Full name: Florian Koch
- Nationality: Swiss
- Born: 5 May 1945 (age 80) Tamins, Switzerland

Sport
- Sport: Cross-country skiing

Flury Koch (born 5 May 1945) is a Swiss cross-country skier. He competed in the men's 15 kilometre event at the 1968 Winter Olympics.
