= Kim Chun-gi =

South Korean cross-country skier

Personal information
- Nationality: South Korean
- Born: 2 May 1946 (age 78); Chung Yu, South Korea

Sport
- Sport: Cross-country skiing

Kim Chun-gi (born 2 May 1946) is a South Korean cross-country skier. He competed in the men's 15 kilometre event at the 1968 Winter Olympics.
