= Tibor Holéczy =

Hungarian cross-country skier (1943–2024)

Personal information
- Nationality: Hungarian
- Born: 23 September 1943; Budapest, Hungary
- Died: 22 March 2024 (aged 80)

Sport
- Sport: Cross-country skiing

Tibor Holéczy (23 September 1943 – 22 March 2024) was a Hungarian cross-country skier. He competed in the men's 15 kilometre event at the 1968 Winter Olympics. Holéczy died in March 2024, at the age of 80.
