= Peter Thiel (cross-country skier) =

German cross-country skier (born 1943)

Personal information
- Nationality: German
- Born: 15 October 1943 (age 81); Klingenthal, Germany

Sport
- Sport: Cross-country skiing

Peter Thiel (born 15 October 1943) is a German former cross-country skier. He competed in the men's 15 kilometre event at the 1968 Winter Olympics.

In 2021, he was awarded the Gold Badge of Honor from the Saxon Ski Association (Skiverbandes Sachsen).
