= Rolf Pettersen =

Canadian cross-country skier

Rolf Bjorger Pettersen (7 January 1946 in Sarpsborg, Norway – 28 June 1981 in Prince George, Canada) was a Canadian cross-country skier who competed in the 1968 Winter Olympics.
