= Janez Mlinar =

Slovenian cross-country skier (1941–2020)

Personal information
- Nationality: Slovenian
- Born: 14 August 1941; Rateče, Yugoslavia
- Died: 2 April 2020 (aged 78)

Sport
- Sport: Cross-country skiing

Janez Mlinar (14 August 1941 – 2 April 2020) was a Slovenian cross-country skier. He competed in the men's 15 kilometre event at the 1968 Winter Olympics.
