= Josef Haas =

Swiss cross-country skier (1937–2024)

Medal record

Men's cross-country skiing

Representing Switzerland

Olympic Games
Bronze medal – third place	1968 Grenoble	50 km

Josef Haas (3 August 1937 – 18 January 2024) was a Swiss cross-country skier who competed in the late 1960s. He won the 50 km bronze at the 1968 Winter Olympics in Grenoble. Haas was the first Swiss to earn a cross-country skiing Olympic medal. He died on 18 January 2024, at the age of 86.

Awards
Preceded by (Switzerland) Werner Duttweiler	Swiss Sportsman of the Year; 1968	Succeeded by (Switzerland) Philippe Clerc
