= Alojz Kerštajn =

Slovenian cross-country skier

Personal information
- Nationality: Slovenian
- Born: 25 March 1947; Jesenice, Yugoslavia
- Died: 1999 (aged 51–52)

Sport
- Sport: Cross-country skiing

Alojz Kerštajn (25 March 1947 – 1999) was a Slovenian cross-country skier. He competed in the men's 15 kilometre event at the 1968 Winter Olympics.
