= Tokio Sato =

Japanese cross-country skier (born 1942)

Personal information
- Nationality: Japanese
- Born: 3 March 1942 (age 83); Hokkaido, Japan

Sport
- Sport: Cross-country skiing

Tokio Sato (佐藤 常貴雄, Satō Tokio, born 3 March 1942) is a Japanese cross-country skier. He competed in the men's 15 kilometre event at the 1968 Winter Olympics.
