= Anatoly Akentyev =

Russian cross-country skier (1942–2023)

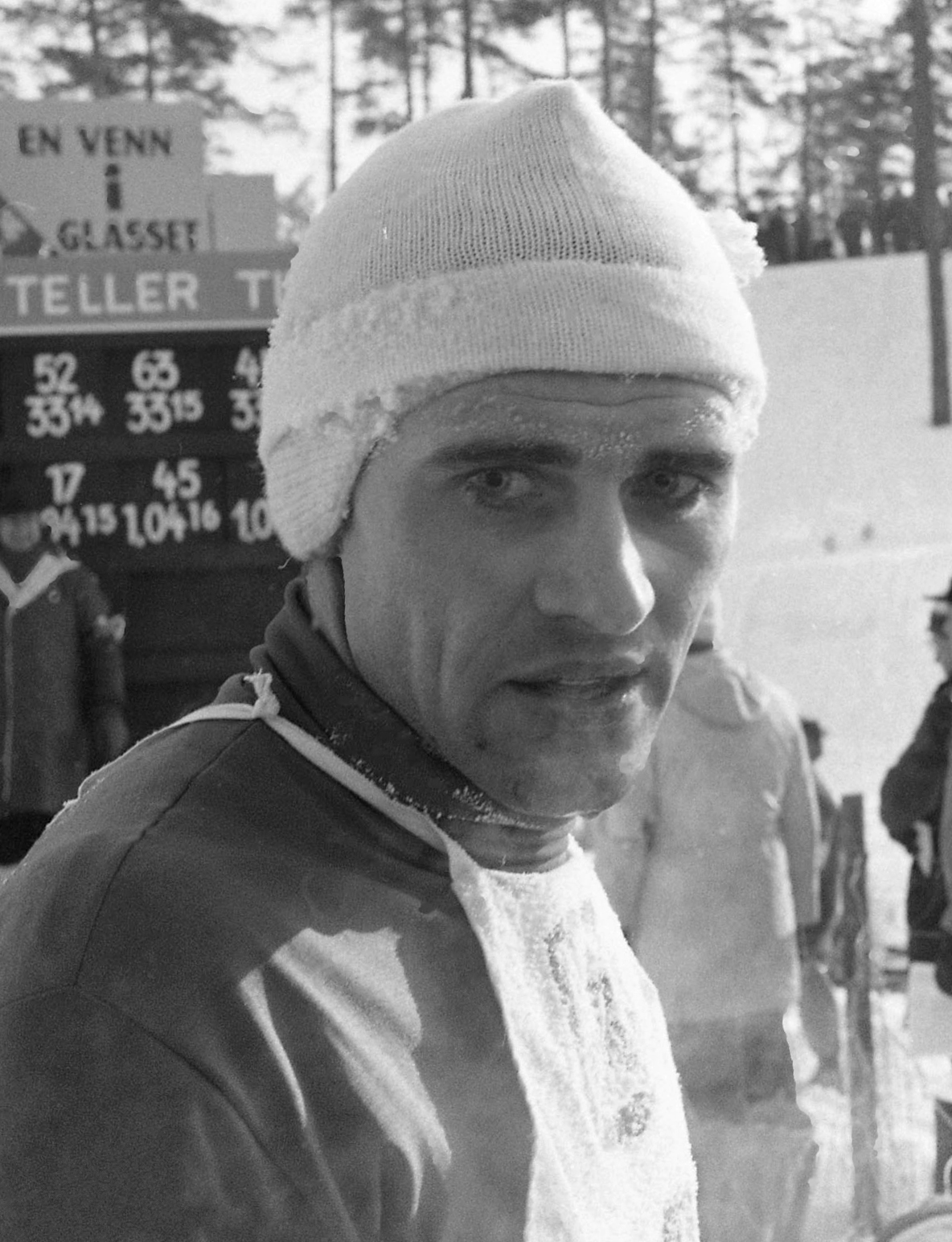
- Akentyev at the 1966 World Championships

Personal information
- Born: 14 February 1942 Nikolaevka, Borovsky District, Russian SFSR, Soviet Union
- Died: 23 April 2023 (aged 81)
- Height: 185 cm (6 ft 1 in)
- Weight: 80 kg (176 lb)

Sport
- Sport: Cross-country skiing
- Club: CSKA Moscow

Anatoly Vasilyevich Akentyev (Russian: Анатолий Васильевич Акентьев; 14 February 1942 – 23 April 2023) was a Soviet cross-country skier who won the 15 km race at the 1967 Holmenkollen Ski Festival. He competed at the 1968 Winter Olympics in the 15, 30, 50 and 4 × 10 km events and finished 10th–20th individually and fourth in the relay. After retiring from competitions Akentyev became a prominent skiing administrator. He was vice president of the International Ski Federation (FIS) since 1979 and its honorary vice president since 2006. Nationally he headed the Soviet and Russian cross-country skiing teams for 15 years and served as president of the Russian Ski Union from 1996 to 2004.

Akentyev died on 23 April 2023, at the age of 81.
