= Karel Štefl (cross-country skier) =

Czech cross-country skier

Personal information
- Nationality: Czech
- Born: 16 March 1946; Nové Město na Moravě, Czechoslovakia
- Died: 23 December 2017 (aged 71)

Sport
- Sport: Cross-country skiing

Karel Štefl (16 March 1946 – 23 December 2017) was a Czech cross-country skier. He competed in the men's 15 kilometre event at the 1968 Winter Olympics.
