= Vít Fousek Jr. =

Czech cross-country skier

Personal information
- Nationality: Czech
- Born: 29 April 1940 (age 85); Nové Město na Moravě, Protectorate of Bohemia and Moravia

Sport
- Sport: Cross-country skiing

Vít Fousek Jr. (born 29 April 1940) is a Czech cross-country skier. He competed in the men's 30 kilometre event at the 1968 Winter Olympics.
