= Nils Skulbru =

Canadian cross-country skier

Nils Skulbru (born 20 July 1938 in Akkarvik, Norway) is a Canadian former cross-country skier who competed in the 1968 Winter Olympics.
