= Akiyoshi Matsuoka =

Japanese cross-country skier (1945–2017)

Personal information
- Nationality: Japanese
- Born: 3 March 1945 Aomori, Japan
- Died: 4 September 2017 (aged 72)

Sport
- Sport: Cross-country skiing

Akiyoshi Matsuoka (松岡 昭義, Matsuoka Akiyoshi; 3 March 1945 – 4 September 2017) was a Japanese cross-country skier. He competed at the 1968 Winter Olympics and the 1972 Winter Olympics.
