= Václav Peřina =

Czech cross-country skier

Personal information
- Nationality: Czech
- Born: 19 February 1945 (age 80); Pouchov (part of Hradec Králové), Protectorate of Bohemia and Moravia

Sport
- Sport: Cross-country skiing

Václav Peřina (born 19 February 1945) is a Czech cross-country skier. He competed in the men's 15 kilometre event at the 1968 Winter Olympics.
