= David Rees (Canadian cross-country skier) =

Canadian cross-country skier

David Rees (born 25 February 1943) is a Canadian former cross-country skier who competed in the 1968 Winter Olympics.
