= Kazuo Sato (skier) =

Japanese cross-country skier (born 1937)

Personal information
- Nationality: Japanese
- Born: 10 June 1937 (age 87); Nagano, Japan

Sport
- Sport: Cross-country skiing

Kazuo Sato (佐藤 和男, Satō Kazuo, born 10 June 1937) is a Japanese cross-country skier. He competed at the 1960 Winter Olympics, the 1964 Winter Olympics and the 1968 Winter Olympics.
