= Roger Pires =

French cross-country skier (born 1940)

Personal information
- Nationality: French
- Born: 12 October 1940 (age 84); Hauteville-Lompnes, France

Sport
- Sport: Cross-country skiing

Roger Pires (born 12 October 1940) is a French cross-country skier. He competed at the 1964 Winter Olympics and the 1968 Winter Olympics.
