= Mike Elliott (skier) =

American cross-country skier (1942–2024)

Personal information
- Nationality: American
- Born: April 3, 1942 Durango, Colorado, U.S.
- Died: September 23, 2024 (aged 82)

Sport
- Sport: Cross-country skiing

Mike Elliott (April 3, 1942 – September 23, 2024) was an American cross-country skier. He competed at the 1964 Winter Olympics, the 1968 Winter Olympics, and the 1972 Winter Olympics.

Elliott died on September 23, 2024, at the age of 82.
