= Jan Fajstavr =

Czech cross-country skier

Personal information
- Nationality: Czech
- Born: 26 March 1944 (age 81); Starkenbach, Reichsgau Sudetenland, Germany

Sport
- Sport: Cross-country skiing

Jan Fajstavr (born 26 March 1944) is a Czech cross-country skier. He competed at the 1968 Winter Olympics, the 1972 Winter Olympics and the 1976 Winter Olympics.
