= Mike Gallagher (skier) =

American cross-country skier (1941–2013)

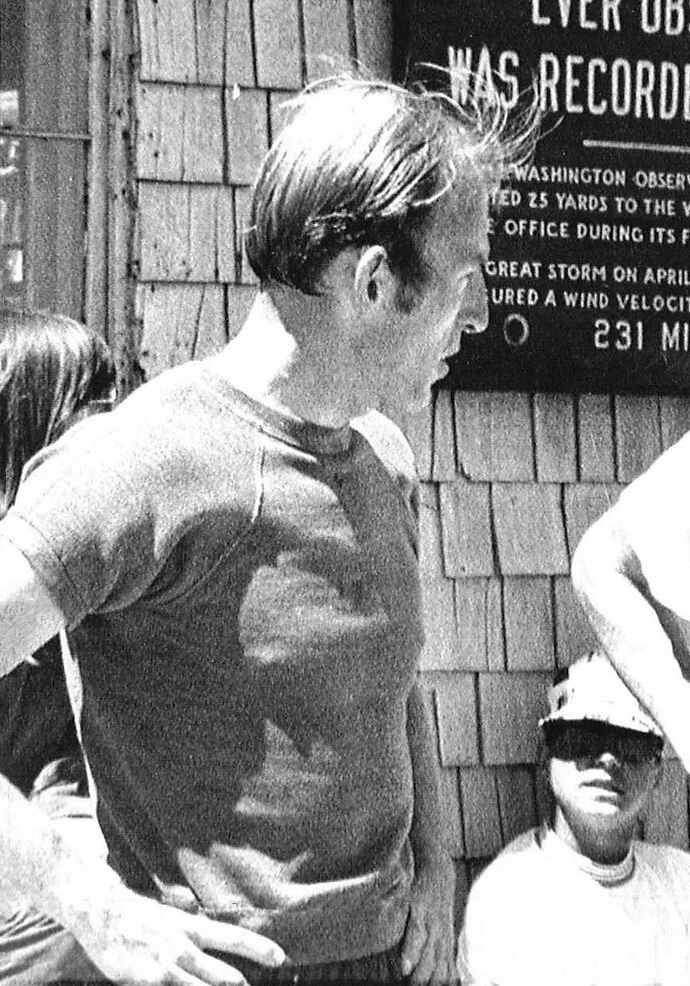
- Gallagher in 1970

Personal information
- Nationality: American
- Born: October 3, 1941; Yonkers, New York, U.S.
- Died: October 3, 2013 (aged 72); Pittsfield, Vermont, U.S.
- Height: 183 cm (6 ft 0 in)
- Weight: 80 kg (176 lb)

Sport
- Sport: Cross-country skiing
- Club: Durango Ski Club

Michael Donald Gallagher (October 3, 1941 – October 3, 2013) was an American cross-country skier. He competed in individual and 4×10 km relay events at the 1964, the 1968 and the 1972 Winter Olympics. His relay teams placed 12th–13th, and his best individual achievement was 22nd place over 50 km in 1968. Gallagher was a nine-time U.S. Champion and finished 19th at the 1968 Holmenkollen Ski Festival in the 50 km event.

Gallagher was introducing to skiing by his father, a veteran of the 10th Mountain Division, and in 1959 won the U.S. junior cross-country championships. He later attended the University of Colorado, and earned a bachelor's degree from Castleton State College in 1967. At Castleton, besides skiing he competed in cycling and middle-distance running, setting a New England collegiate records over 880 yards, one mile and 2-miles.

After retiring from competitions, Gallagher coached the U.S. National team and was part of the 1980, 1984, and 1992 Olympic cycles. Besides, he coached cross-country skiing at high school for 17 years and worked for Mountain Top Inn and Mountain Meadows skiing schools. He also worked the Splitkein, Hexell, Edysbyn and Elan ski companies on the development of fiberglass skis. In 2007 he was inducted to the Vermont Ski and Snowboard Museum Hall of Fame, and in 2011 into the Mount Washington Road Race Hall of Fame.
