= Walter Demel =

German cross-country skier (1935–2023)

Medal record

Men's cross-country skiing

Representing West Germany

World Championships
Bronze medal – third place	1966 Oslo	30 km

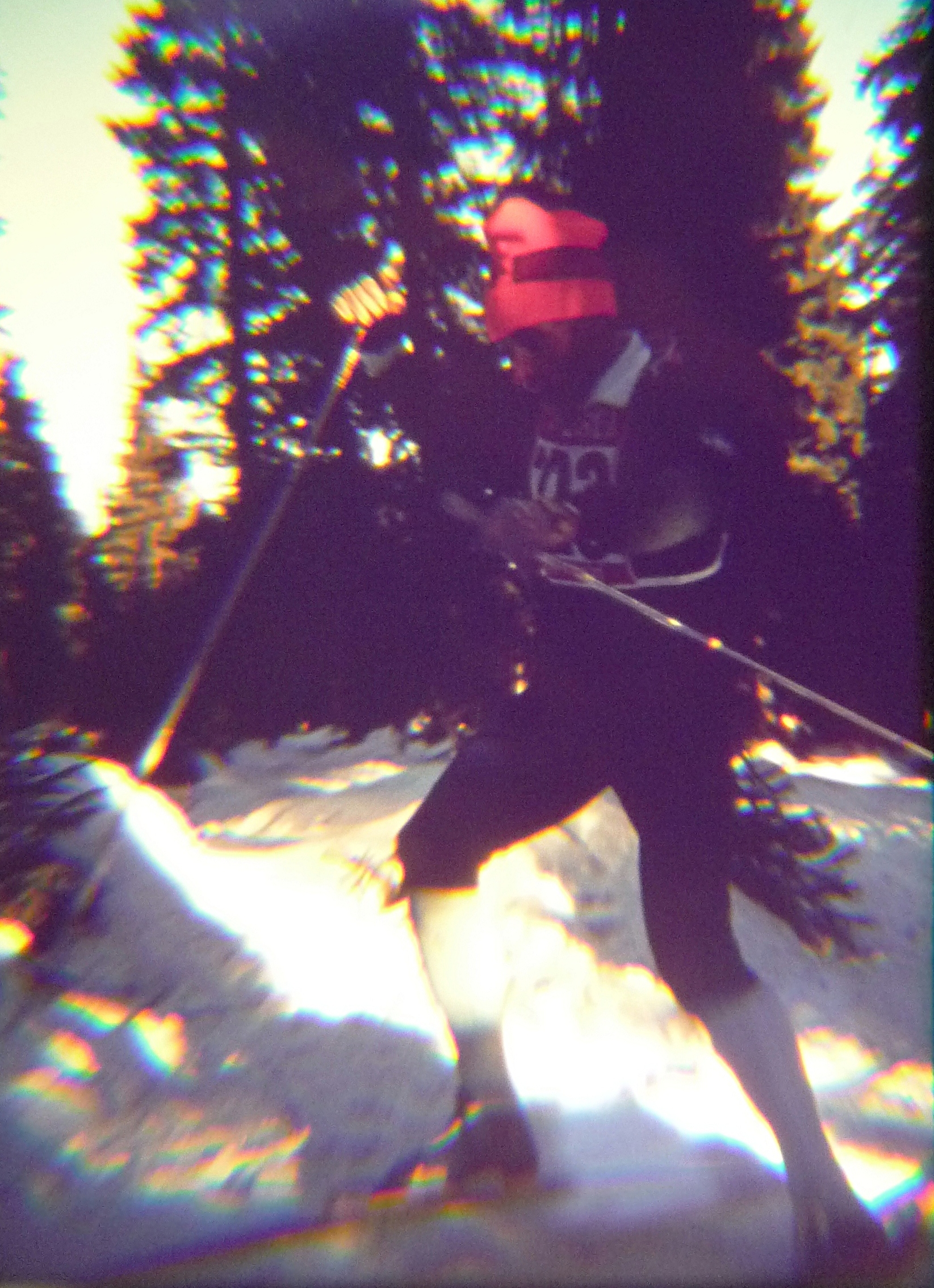
Demel in 1973

Walter Demel (1 December 1935 – 19 April 2023) was a West German cross-country skier who competed during the 1960s and 1970s. He won a bronze medal in the 30 km event at the 1966 FIS Nordic World Ski Championships.

Demel's best finish at the Winter Olympics was 5th in the 30 km and 50 km events in 1972.

He was born in Bayreuth, Bavaria, Germany.

== Sources ==
- Walter Demel at the International Ski and Snowboard Federation. Incorrect F.I.S listing under Soviet Nationality
