= Speed skating at the 1968 Winter Olympics – Men's 5000 metres =

Speed skating at the Olympics

Men's 5000 metres speed skating at the X Olympic Winter Games
- Pictogram for speed skating
- Venue: L'Anneau de Vitesse
- Date: 15 February 1968
- Competitors: 38 from 17 nations
- Winning time: 7:22.4 WR

Medalists
1st place, gold medalist(s)		Fred Anton Maier	Norway
2nd place, silver medalist(s)		Kees Verkerk	Netherlands
3rd place, bronze medalist(s)		Peter Nottet	Netherlands

The men's 5000 metres in speed skating at the 1968 Winter Olympics took place on 15 February, at the L'Anneau de Vitesse.

== Records ==
Prior to this competition, the existing world and Olympic records were as follows:

World record	Fred Anton Maier (NOR)	7:26.2	Deventer, Netherlands	7 January 1968
Olympic record	Knut Johannesen (NOR)	7:38.4	Innsbruck, Austria	5 February 1964

The following new world record was set.

Date	Athlete	Time	OR	WR
15 February	Fred Anton Maier (NOR)	7:22.4	OR	WR

== Results ==
Rank	Athlete	Country	Time	Notes
1st place, gold medalist(s)	Fred Anton Maier	Norway	7:22.4	WR
2nd place, silver medalist(s)	Kees Verkerk	Netherlands	7:23.2	
3rd place, bronze medalist(s)	Peter Nottet	Netherlands	7:25.5	
4	Per Willy Guttormsen	Norway	7:27.8	
5	Johnny Höglin	Sweden	7:32.7	
6	Örjan Sandler	Sweden	7:32.8	
7	Jonny Nilsson	Sweden	7:32.9	
8	Jan Bols	Netherlands	7:33.1	
9	Kimmo Koskinen	Finland	7:35.9	
10	Valery Lavrushkin	Soviet Union	7:37.9	
11	Stanislav Selyanin	Soviet Union	7:38.5	
12	Svein-Erik Stiansen	Norway	7:39.6	
13	Günter Traub	West Germany	7:40.4	
14	Anatoly Mashkov	Soviet Union	7:41.9	
15	Jouko Launonen	Finland	7:46.5	
16	Hermann Strutz	Austria	7:53.3	
17	Raimo Hietala	Finland	7:54.0	
18	Giancarlo Gloder	Italy	7:54.5	
19	Paul Enock	Canada	7:54.8	
20	Jürgen Traub	West Germany	7:55.3	
21	Yoshiaki Demachi	Japan	7:55.6	
22	Tadao Ishihata	Japan	7:55.8	
23	Guido Gillarduzzi	Italy	7:57.4	
24	Bill Lanigan	United States	7:57.7	
25	Bill Cox	United States	7:58.1	
26	Renato De Riva	Italy	7:58.2	
27	John Blewitt	Great Britain	7:59.8	
28	Wayne LeBombard	United States	8:03.8	
29	Bob Hodges	Canada	8:05.0	
30	Michel Thépénier	France	8:06.2	
31	György Ivánkai	Hungary	8:07.5	
31	François Perrenoud	France	8:07.5	
33	Mutsuhiko Maeda	Japan	8:08.3	
34	Franz Krienbühl	Switzerland	8:08.9	
35	Ruedi Uster	Switzerland	8:12.2	
36	Luvsansharavyn Tsend	Mongolia	8:15.8	
37	Erich Korbel	Austria	8:20.8	
38	Lee Ik-Hwan	South Korea	8:28.2	
