= Speed skating at the 1968 Winter Olympics – Men's 10,000 metres =

Speed skating at the Olympics

Men's 10,000 metres speed skating at the X Olympic Winter Games
- Pictogram for speed skating
- Venue: L'Anneau de Vitesse
- Date: 17 February 1968
- Competitors: 28 from 13 nations
- Winning time: 15:23.6 OR

Medalists
1st place, gold medalist(s)		Johnny Höglin; Sweden
2nd place, silver medalist(s)		Fred Anton Maier; Norway
3rd place, bronze medalist(s)		Örjan Sandler; Sweden

The men's 10,000 metres in speed skating at the 1968 Winter Olympics took place on 17 February, at the L'Anneau de Vitesse.

== Records ==
Prior to this competition, the existing world and Olympic records were as follows:

World record	Fred Anton Maier (NOR)	15:20.3	Oslo, Norway	28 January 1968
Olympic record	Knut Johannesen (NOR)	15:46.6	Squaw Valley, United States	27 February 1960

The following new Olympic record was set.

Date	Athlete	Time	OR	WR
17 February	Johnny Höglin (SWE)	15:23.6	OR	

== Results ==
Rank	Athlete	Country	Time	Notes
1st place, gold medalist(s)	Johnny Höglin	Sweden	15:23.6	OR
2nd place, silver medalist(s)	Fred Anton Maier	Norway	15:23.9	
3rd place, bronze medalist(s)	Örjan Sandler	Sweden	15:31.8	
4	Per Willy Guttormsen	Norway	15:32.6	
5	Kees Verkerk	Netherlands	15:33.9	
6	Jonny Nilsson	Sweden	15:39.6	
7	Magne Thomassen	Norway	15:44.9	
8	Peter Nottet	Netherlands	15:54.7	
9	Valery Lavrushkin	Soviet Union	15:54.8	
10	Stanislav Selyanin	Soviet Union	15:56.4	
11	Günter Traub	West Germany	16:01.3	
12	Jouko Launonen	Finland	16:02.1	
13	Jan Bols	Netherlands	16:09.5	
14	Kimmo Koskinen	Finland	16:15.7	
15	Paul Enock	Canada	16:21.2	
16	Anatoly Mashkov	Soviet Union	16:22.1	
17	Hermann Strutz	Austria	16:24.9	
18	Jürgen Traub	West Germany	16:33.8	
19	Renato De Riva	Italy	16:39.5	
20	Raimo Hietala	Finland	16:45.9	
21	Bill Lanigan	United States	16:50.1	
22	Yoshiaki Demachi	Japan	16:54.6	
23	Bob Hodges	Canada	17:01.9	
24	Giancarlo Gloder	Italy	17:03.2	
25	Bill Cox	United States	17:08.2	
26	François Perrenoud	France	17:10.2	
27	György Ivánkai	Hungary	17:36.2	
28	Hirofumi Otsuka	Japan	17:38.8	
