= List of Olympic medalists in speed skating =

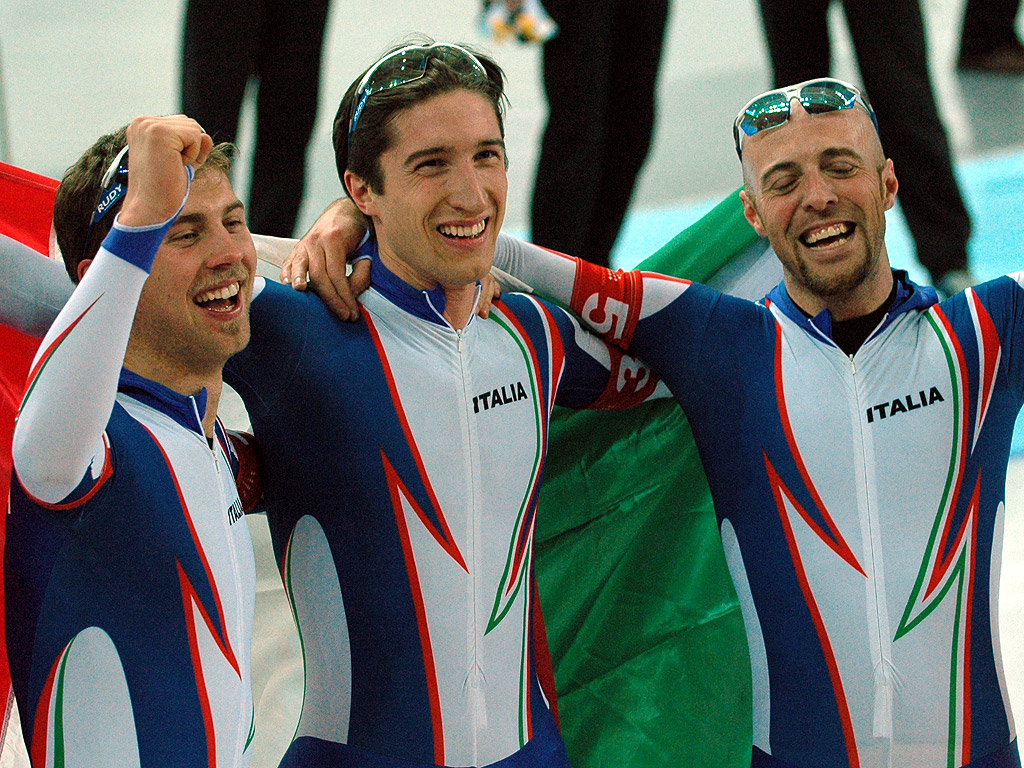
Italy, the gold medalists in the 2006 Winter Olympics men's team pursuit event. From left to right: Matteo Anesi, Enrico Fabris and Ippolito Sanfratello.

Speed skating is a sport that has been contested at the Winter Olympic Games since the inaugural Games in 1924. Events held at the first Winter Olympics included the men's 500-metre, 1500-metre, 5000-metre, and 10,000-metre races. Points from the four races were combined and counted towards the all-round event, which was dropped following the 1924 Olympics. Speed skating events for women were first held at the 1932 Winter Olympics, as part of the demonstration program. The organizing committee of those Games advocated for the full inclusion of the women's events, but the IOC rejected that. The first official women's events were held in Squaw Valley 1960 with the 500-metre, 1000-metre, 1500-metre, and 3000-metre distances. The men's 1000-metre event was added in 1976 and the women's 5000-metre event was added in 1988. All 10 events have been held at every Olympic Games since, and a team pursuit event for both genders was added in 2006, for a total of 12 medal events.

Dutch skater Ireen Wüst has won thirteen medals — six gold, five silver, and two bronze — more than any other speed skater at the Olympics. Russian Lidiya Skoblikova, who represented the Soviet Union, is one of four female Winter Olympians to win six gold medals (cross-country skier Lyubov Yegorova, luger Natalie Geisenberger and the aforementioned Ireen Wüst are the others). At the 1924 Winter Olympics, Finn Clas Thunberg became the first athlete to win two or more gold medals; in 1928, he became the first speed skater to successfully defend an Olympic title. At the 1964 Games, Skoblikova won four gold medals and became the first athlete to win a gold in every available event. The feat was repeated in 1980 by American Eric Heiden, who won five golds, the most that any Winter Olympian has won at one edition of the Games. In 2006, Canadian Cindy Klassen became the only other speed skater, and one of seven Winter Olympians, to win five medals—one gold, two silver, two bronze—at a single edition of the Games. Pechstein, American Bonnie Blair, and Sven Kramer of the Netherlands are the only speed skaters to win gold in the same event three times in a row. Andrea Schöne, who won a silver medal in 1976, is the youngest female athlete in an individual event to win a medal. German Christa Luding-Rothenburger and Canadian Clara Hughes are the only medal-winning speed skaters who have also won a medal at the Summer Olympic Games, having won medals in cycling.

Dutch speed skaters have been the most successful in terms of combined medals (121), as well as gold medals (42). After the 2018 Winter Olympics, 190 gold medals, 193 silver medals and 186 bronze medals have been awarded since 1924 and have been won by speed skaters from 23 National Olympic Committees.

== Men ==
=== 500 metres ===
Games	Gold	Silver	Bronze
1924 Chamonix	Charles Jewtraw; United States	Oskar Olsen; Norway	Roald Larsen; Norway
1924 Chamonix	Charles Jewtraw; United States	Oskar Olsen; Norway	Clas Thunberg; Finland
1928 St. Moritz	Bernt Evensen; Norway	None awarded	Roald Larsen; Norway
1928 St. Moritz	Bernt Evensen; Norway	None awarded	Jaakko Friman; Finland
1928 St. Moritz	Clas Thunberg; Finland	None awarded	Jaakko Friman; Finland
1928 St. Moritz	Clas Thunberg; Finland	None awarded	John Farrell; United States
1932 Lake Placid	Jack Shea; United States	Bernt Evensen; Norway	Alexander Hurd; Canada
1936 Garmisch-Partenkirchen	Ivar Ballangrud; Norway	Georg Krog; Norway	Leo Freisinger; United States
1948 St. Moritz	Finn Helgesen; Norway	Ken Bartholomew; United States	None awarded
1948 St. Moritz	Finn Helgesen; Norway	Thomas Byberg; Norway	None awarded
1948 St. Moritz	Finn Helgesen; Norway	Robert Fitzgerald; United States	None awarded
1952 Oslo	Ken Henry; United States	Don McDermott; United States	Gordon Audley; Canada
1952 Oslo	Ken Henry; United States	Don McDermott; United States	Arne Johansen; Norway
1956 Cortina d'Ampezzo	Yevgeny Grishin; Soviet Union	Rafayel Grach; Soviet Union	Alv Gjestvang; Norway
1960 Squaw Valley	Yevgeny Grishin; Soviet Union	Bill Disney; United States	Rafayel Grach; Soviet Union
1964 Innsbruck	Terry McDermott; United States	Alv Gjestvang; Norway	None awarded
1964 Innsbruck	Terry McDermott; United States	Yevgeny Grishin; Soviet Union	None awarded
1964 Innsbruck	Terry McDermott; United States	Vladimir Orlov; Soviet Union	None awarded
1968 Grenoble	Erhard Keller; West Germany	Terry McDermott; United States	None awarded
1968 Grenoble	Erhard Keller; West Germany	Magne Thomassen; Norway	None awarded
1972 Sapporo	Erhard Keller; West Germany	Hasse Börjes; Sweden	Valery Muratov; Soviet Union
1976 Innsbruck	Yevgeny Kulikov; Soviet Union	Valery Muratov; Soviet Union	Dan Immerfall; United States
1980 Lake Placid	Eric Heiden; United States	Yevgeny Kulikov; Soviet Union	Lieuwe de Boer; Netherlands
1984 Sarajevo	Sergey Fokichev; Soviet Union	Yoshihiro Kitazawa; Japan	Gaétan Boucher; Canada
1988 Calgary	Uwe-Jens Mey; East Germany	Jan Ykema; Netherlands	Akira Kuroiwa; Japan
1992 Albertville	Uwe-Jens Mey; Germany	Toshiyuki Kuroiwa; Japan	Junichi Inoue; Japan
1994 Lillehammer	Aleksandr Golubev; Russia	Sergey Klevchenya; Russia	Manabu Horii; Japan
1998 Nagano	Hiroyasu Shimizu; Japan	Jeremy Wotherspoon; Canada	Kevin Overland; Canada
2002 Salt Lake City	Casey FitzRandolph; United States	Hiroyasu Shimizu; Japan	Kip Carpenter; United States
2006 Turin	Joey Cheek; United States	Dmitry Dorofeyev; Russia	Lee Kang-seok; South Korea
2010 Vancouver	Mo Tae-bum; South Korea	Keiichiro Nagashima; Japan	Joji Kato; Japan
2014 Sochi	Michel Mulder; Netherlands	Jan Smeekens; Netherlands	Ronald Mulder; Netherlands
2018 PyeongChang	Håvard Holmefjord Lorentzen; Norway	Cha Min-kyu; South Korea	Gao Tingyu; China
2022 Beijing	Gao Tingyu; China	Cha Min-kyu; South Korea	Wataru Morishige; Japan
2026 Milan Cortina	Jordan Stolz; United States	Jenning de Boo; Netherlands	Laurent Dubreuil; Canada

Medals
Rank	Nation	Gold	Silver	Bronze	Total
1	United States	8	5	4	17
2	Norway	4	6	4	14
3	Soviet Union	4	5	2	11
4	West Germany	2	0	0	2
5	Japan	1	4	5	10
6	Netherlands	1	3	2	6
7	South Korea	1	2	1	4
8	Russia	1	2	0	3
9	Finland	1	0	2	3
10	China	1	0	1	2
11	East Germany	1	0	0	1
11	Germany	1	0	0	1
13	Canada	0	1	5	6
14	Sweden	0	1	0	1
Total	14 nations	26	27	26	79

=== 1000 metres ===
Games	Gold	Silver	Bronze
1976 Innsbruck	Peter Mueller; United States	Jørn Didriksen; Norway	Valery Muratov; Soviet Union
1980 Lake Placid	Eric Heiden; United States	Gaétan Boucher; Canada	Vladimir Lobanov; Soviet Union
1980 Lake Placid	Eric Heiden; United States	Gaétan Boucher; Canada	Frode Rønning; Norway
1984 Sarajevo	Gaétan Boucher; Canada	Sergey Khlebnikov; Soviet Union	Kai Arne Engelstad; Norway
1988 Calgary	Nikolay Gulyayev; Soviet Union	Uwe-Jens Mey; East Germany	Igor Zhelezovski; Soviet Union
1992 Albertville	Olaf Zinke; Germany	Kim Yoon-man; South Korea	Yukinori Miyabe; Japan
1994 Lillehammer	Dan Jansen; United States	Igor Zhelezovski; Belarus	Sergey Klevchenya; Russia
1998 Nagano	Ids Postma; Netherlands	Jan Bos; Netherlands	Hiroyasu Shimizu; Japan
2002 Salt Lake City	Gerard van Velde; Netherlands	Jan Bos; Netherlands	Joey Cheek; United States
2006 Turin	Shani Davis; United States	Joey Cheek; United States	Erben Wennemars; Netherlands
2010 Vancouver	Shani Davis; United States	Mo Tae-bum; South Korea	Chad Hedrick; United States
2014 Sochi	Stefan Groothuis; Netherlands	Denny Morrison; Canada	Michel Mulder; Netherlands
2018 PyeongChang	Kjeld Nuis; Netherlands	Håvard Holmefjord Lorentzen; Norway	Kim Tae-yun; South Korea
2022 Beijing	Thomas Krol; Netherlands	Laurent Dubreuil; Canada	Håvard Holmefjord Lorentzen; Norway
2026 Milan Cortina	Jordan Stolz; United States	Jenning de Boo; Netherlands	Ning Zhongyan; China

Medals
Rank	Nation	Gold	Silver	Bronze	Total
1	United States	6	1	2	9
2	Netherlands	5	3	2	10
3	Canada	1	3	0	4
4	Soviet Union	1	1	3	5
5	Germany	1	0	0	1
6	Norway	0	2	3	5
7	South Korea	0	2	1	3
8	East Germany	0	1	0	1
8	Belarus	0	1	0	1
10	Japan	0	0	2	2
11	Russia	0	0	1	1
11	China	0	0	1	1
Total	12 nations	14	14	15	43

=== 1500 metres ===
Games	Gold	Silver	Bronze
1924 Chamonix	Clas Thunberg; Finland	Roald Larsen; Norway	Sigurd Moen; Norway
1928 St. Moritz	Clas Thunberg; Finland	Bernt Evensen; Norway	Ivar Ballangrud; Norway
1932 Lake Placid	Jack Shea; United States	Alexander Hurd; Canada	Willy Logan; Canada
1936 Garmisch-Partenkirchen	Charles Mathiesen; Norway	Ivar Ballangrud; Norway	Birger Wasenius; Finland
1948 St. Moritz	Sverre Farstad; Norway	Åke Seyffarth; Sweden	Odd Lundberg; Norway
1952 Oslo	Hjalmar Andersen; Norway	Wim van der Voort; Netherlands	Roald Aas; Norway
1956 Cortina d'Ampezzo	Yevgeny Grishin; Soviet Union	None awarded	Toivo Salonen; Finland
1956 Cortina d'Ampezzo	Yuri Mikhaylov; Soviet Union	None awarded	Toivo Salonen; Finland
1960 Squaw Valley	Roald Aas; Norway	None awarded	Boris Stenin; Soviet Union
1960 Squaw Valley	Yevgeny Grishin; Soviet Union	None awarded	Boris Stenin; Soviet Union
1964 Innsbruck	Ants Antson; Soviet Union	Kees Verkerk; Netherlands	Villy Haugen; Norway
1968 Grenoble	Kees Verkerk; Netherlands	Ivar Eriksen; Norway	None awarded
1968 Grenoble	Kees Verkerk; Netherlands	Ard Schenk; Netherlands	None awarded
1972 Sapporo	Ard Schenk; Netherlands	Roar Grønvold; Norway	Göran Claeson; Sweden
1976 Innsbruck	Jan Egil Storholt; Norway	Yuri Kondakov; Soviet Union	Hans van Helden; Netherlands
1980 Lake Placid	Eric Heiden; United States	Kay Arne Stenshjemmet; Norway	Terje Andersen; Norway
1984 Sarajevo	Gaétan Boucher; Canada	Sergey Khlebnikov; Soviet Union	Oleg Bozhev; Soviet Union
1988 Calgary	André Hoffmann; East Germany	Eric Flaim; United States	Michael Hadschieff; Austria
1992 Albertville	Johann Olav Koss; Norway	Ådne Søndrål; Norway	Leo Visser; Netherlands
1994 Lillehammer	Johann Olav Koss; Norway	Rintje Ritsma; Netherlands	Falko Zandstra; Netherlands
1998 Nagano	Ådne Søndrål; Norway	Ids Postma; Netherlands	Rintje Ritsma; Netherlands
2002 Salt Lake City	Derek Parra; United States	Jochem Uytdehaage; Netherlands	Ådne Søndrål; Norway
2006 Turin	Enrico Fabris; Italy	Shani Davis; United States	Chad Hedrick; United States
2010 Vancouver	Mark Tuitert; Netherlands	Shani Davis; United States	Håvard Bøkko; Norway
2014 Sochi	Zbigniew Bródka; Poland	Koen Verweij; Netherlands	Denny Morrison; Canada
2018 PyeongChang	Kjeld Nuis; Netherlands	Patrick Roest; Netherlands	Kim Min-seok; South Korea
2022 Beijing	Kjeld Nuis; Netherlands	Thomas Krol; Netherlands	Kim Min-seok; South Korea
2026 Milano Cortina	Ning Zhongyan; China	Jordan Stolz; United States	Kjeld Nuis; Netherlands

Medals
Rank	Nation	Gold	Silver	Bronze	Total
1	Norway	8	7	8	23
2	Netherlands	5	9	4	18
3	Soviet Union	4	2	2	8
4	United States	3	3	1	7
5	Finland	2	0	2	4
6	Canada	1	1	2	4
7	East Germany	1	0	0	1
7	Italy	1	0	0	1
7	Poland	1	0	0	1
10	Sweden	0	1	1	2
11	South Korea	0	0	2	2
12	Austria	0	0	1	1
Total	12 nations	26	23	23	69

=== 5000 metres ===
Games	Gold	Silver	Bronze
1924 Chamonix	Clas Thunberg; Finland	Julius Skutnabb; Finland	Roald Larsen; Norway
1928 St. Moritz	Ivar Ballangrud; Norway	Julius Skutnabb; Finland	Bernt Evensen; Norway
1932 Lake Placid	Irving Jaffee; United States	Eddie Murphy; United States	Willy Logan; Canada
1936 Garmisch-Partenkirchen	Ivar Ballangrud; Norway	Birger Wasenius; Finland	Antero Ojala; Finland
1948 St. Moritz	Reidar Liaklev; Norway	Odd Lundberg; Norway	Göthe Hedlund; Sweden
1952 Oslo	Hjalmar Andersen; Norway	Kees Broekman; Netherlands	Sverre Haugli; Norway
1956 Cortina d'Ampezzo	Boris Shilkov; Soviet Union	Sigge Ericsson; Sweden	Oleg Goncharenko; Soviet Union
1960 Squaw Valley	Viktor Kosichkin; Soviet Union	Knut Johannesen; Norway	Jan Pesman; Netherlands
1964 Innsbruck	Knut Johannesen; Norway	Per Ivar Moe; Norway	Fred Anton Maier; Norway
1968 Grenoble	Fred Anton Maier; Norway	Kees Verkerk; Netherlands	Peter Nottet; Netherlands
1972 Sapporo	Ard Schenk; Netherlands	Roar Grønvold; Norway	Sten Stensen; Norway
1976 Innsbruck	Sten Stensen; Norway	Piet Kleine; Netherlands	Hans van Helden; Netherlands
1980 Lake Placid	Eric Heiden; United States	Kay Arne Stenshjemmet; Norway	Tom Erik Oxholm; Norway
1984 Sarajevo	Tomas Gustafson; Sweden	Igor Malkov; Soviet Union	René Schöfisch; East Germany
1988 Calgary	Tomas Gustafson; Sweden	Leo Visser; Netherlands	Gerard Kemkers; Netherlands
1992 Albertville	Geir Karlstad; Norway	Falko Zandstra; Netherlands	Leo Visser; Netherlands
1994 Lillehammer	Johann Olav Koss; Norway	Kjell Storelid; Norway	Rintje Ritsma; Netherlands
1998 Nagano	Gianni Romme; Netherlands	Rintje Ritsma; Netherlands	Bart Veldkamp; Belgium
2002 Salt Lake City	Jochem Uytdehaage; Netherlands	Derek Parra; United States	Jens Boden; Germany
2006 Turin	Chad Hedrick; United States	Sven Kramer; Netherlands	Enrico Fabris; Italy
2010 Vancouver	Sven Kramer; Netherlands	Lee Seung-hoon; South Korea	Ivan Skobrev; Russia
2014 Sochi	Sven Kramer; Netherlands	Jan Blokhuijsen; Netherlands	Jorrit Bergsma; Netherlands
2018 PyeongChang	Sven Kramer; Netherlands	Ted-Jan Bloemen; Canada	Sverre Lunde Pedersen; Norway
2022 Beijing	Nils van der Poel; Sweden	Patrick Roest; Netherlands	Hallgeir Engebråten; Norway
2026 Milan Cortina	Sander Eitrem; Norway	Metoděj Jílek; Czech Republic	Riccardo Lorello; Italy

Medals
Rank	Nation	Gold	Silver	Bronze	Total
1	Norway	10	6	8	24
2	Netherlands	6	9	7	22
3	United States	3	2	0	5
4	Sweden	3	1	1	4
5	Soviet Union	2	1	1	4
6	Finland	1	3	1	5
7	Canada	0	1	1	2
8	Czech Republic	0	1	0	1
8	South Korea	0	1	0	1
10	Italy	0	0	2	2
11	Belgium	0	0	1	1
11	East Germany	0	0	1	1
11	Germany	0	0	1	1
11	Russia	0	0	1	1
Total	14 nations	25	25	25	75

=== 10,000 metres ===
Games	Gold	Silver	Bronze
1924 Chamonix	Julius Skutnabb; Finland	Clas Thunberg; Finland	Roald Larsen; Norway
1928 St. Moritz	Cancelled halfway through the running of the event due to poor ice conditions.		
1932 Lake Placid	Irving Jaffee; United States	Ivar Ballangrud; Norway	Franck Stack; Canada
1936 Garmisch-Partenkirchen	Ivar Ballangrud; Norway	Birger Wasenius; Finland	Max Stiepl; Austria
1948 St. Moritz	Åke Seyffarth; Sweden	Lassi Parkkinen; Finland	Pentti Lammio; Finland
1952 Oslo	Hjalmar Andersen; Norway	Kees Broekman; Netherlands	Carl-Erik Asplund; Sweden
1956 Cortina d'Ampezzo	Sigge Ericsson; Sweden	Knut Johannesen; Norway	Oleg Goncharenko; Soviet Union
1960 Squaw Valley	Knut Johannesen; Norway	Viktor Kosichkin; Soviet Union	Kjell Bäckman; Sweden
1964 Innsbruck	Jonny Nilsson; Sweden	Fred Anton Maier; Norway	Knut Johannesen; Norway
1968 Grenoble	Johnny Höglin; Sweden	Fred Anton Maier; Norway	Örjan Sandler; Sweden
1972 Sapporo	Ard Schenk; Netherlands	Kees Verkerk; Netherlands	Sten Stensen; Norway
1976 Innsbruck	Piet Kleine; Netherlands	Sten Stensen; Norway	Hans van Helden; Netherlands
1980 Lake Placid	Eric Heiden; United States	Piet Kleine; Netherlands	Tom Erik Oxholm; Norway
1984 Sarajevo	Igor Malkov; Soviet Union	Tomas Gustafson; Sweden	René Schöfisch; East Germany
1988 Calgary	Tomas Gustafson; Sweden	Michael Hadschieff; Austria	Leo Visser; Netherlands
1992 Albertville	Bart Veldkamp; Netherlands	Johann Olav Koss; Norway	Geir Karlstad; Norway
1994 Lillehammer	Johann Olav Koss; Norway	Kjell Storelid; Norway	Bart Veldkamp; Netherlands
1998 Nagano	Gianni Romme; Netherlands	Bob de Jong; Netherlands	Rintje Ritsma; Netherlands
2002 Salt Lake City	Jochem Uytdehaage; Netherlands	Gianni Romme; Netherlands	Lasse Sætre; Norway
2006 Turin	Bob de Jong; Netherlands	Chad Hedrick; United States	Carl Verheijen; Netherlands
2010 Vancouver	Lee Seung-hoon; South Korea	Ivan Skobrev; Russia	Bob de Jong; Netherlands
2014 Sochi	Jorrit Bergsma; Netherlands	Sven Kramer; Netherlands	Bob de Jong; Netherlands
2018 PyeongChang	Ted-Jan Bloemen; Canada	Jorrit Bergsma; Netherlands	Nicola Tumolero; Italy
2022 Beijing	Nils van der Poel; Sweden	Patrick Roest; Netherlands	Davide Ghiotto; Italy
2026 Milan Cortina	Metoděj Jílek; Czech Republic	Vladimir Semirunniy; Poland	Jorrit Bergsma; Netherlands

Medals
Rank	Nation	Gold	Silver	Bronze	Total
1	Netherlands	7	8	8	23
2	Sweden	6	1	3	10
3	Norway	4	7	6	17
4	United States	2	1	0	3
5	Finland	1	3	1	5
6	Soviet Union	1	1	1	3
7	Canada	1	0	1	2
8	South Korea	1	0	0	1
8	Czech Republic	1	0	0	1
10	Austria	0	1	1	2
11	Russia	0	1	0	1
11	Poland	0	1	0	1
12	Italy	0	0	2	2
13	East Germany	0	0	1	1
Total	13 nations	23	23	23	69

=== Mass start ===
Games	Gold	Silver	Bronze
2018 PyeongChang	Lee Seung-hoon; South Korea	Bart Swings; Belgium	Koen Verweij; Netherlands
2022 Beijing	Bart Swings; Belgium	Chung Jae-won; South Korea	Lee Seung-hoon; South Korea
2026 Milan Cortina	Jorrit Bergsma; Netherlands	Viktor Hald Thorup; Denmark	Andrea Giovannini; Italy

Medals
Rank	Nation	Gold	Silver	Bronze	Total
1	South Korea	1	1	1	3
2	Belgium	1	1	0	2
3	Netherlands	1	0	1	1
4	Denmark	0	1	0	1
5	Italy	0	0	1	1
Total	5 nations	3	3	3	9

=== Team pursuit ===
Games	Gold	Silver	Bronze
2006 Turin	Italy; Matteo Anesi; Stefano Donagrandi; Enrico Fabris; Ippolito Sanfratello	Canada; Arne Dankers; Steven Elm; Denny Morrison; Jason Parker; Justin Warsylewicz	Netherlands; Sven Kramer; Rintje Ritsma; Mark Tuitert; Carl Verheijen; Erben Wennemars
2010 Vancouver	Canada; Mathieu Giroux; Lucas Makowsky; Denny Morrison	United States; Brian Hansen; Chad Hedrick; Jonathan Kuck; Trevor Marsicano	Netherlands; Jan Blokhuijsen; Sven Kramer; Simon Kuipers; Mark Tuitert
2014 Sochi	Netherlands; Jan Blokhuijsen; Sven Kramer; Koen Verweij	South Korea; Joo Hyong-jun; Kim Cheol-min; Lee Seung-hoon	Poland; Zbigniew Bródka; Konrad Niedźwiedzki; Jan Szymański
2018 PyeongChang	Norway; Håvard Bøkko; Simen Spieler Nilsen; Sverre Lunde Pedersen; Sindre Henriksen	South Korea; Lee Seung-hoon; Chung Jae-won; Kim Min-seok	Netherlands; Patrick Roest; Jan Blokhuijsen; Sven Kramer; Koen Verweij
2022 Beijing	Norway; Hallgeir Engebråten; Peder Kongshaug; Sverre Lunde Pedersen	ROC; Daniil Aldoshkin; Sergey Trofimov; Ruslan Zakharov	United States; Ethan Cepuran; Casey Dawson; Emery Lehman; Joey Mantia
2026 Milano Cortina	Italy; Davide Ghiotto; Andrea Giovannini; Michele Malfatti	United States; Casey Dawson; Emery Lehman; Ethan Cepuran	China; Li Wenhao; Liu Hanbin; Wu Yu; Ning Zhongyan

Medals
Rank	Nation	Gold	Silver	Bronze	Total
1	Norway	2	0	0	2
2	Canada	1	1	0	2
3	Netherlands	1	0	3	4
4	Italy	2	0	0	2
5	South Korea	0	2	0	2
6	United States	0	2	1	3
7	ROC	0	1	0	1
8	Poland	0	0	1	1
8	China	0	0	1	1
Total	9 nations	6	6	6	18

== Women ==
=== 500 metres ===
Games	Gold	Silver	Bronze
1960 Squaw Valley	Helga Haase; United Team of Germany	Natalya Donchenko; Soviet Union	Jeanne Ashworth; United States
1964 Innsbruck	Lidiya Skoblikova; Soviet Union	Irina Yegorova; Soviet Union	Tatyana Sidorova; Soviet Union
1968 Grenoble	Lyudmila Titova; Soviet Union	Jenny Fish; United States	None awarded
1968 Grenoble	Lyudmila Titova; Soviet Union	Dianne Holum; United States	None awarded
1968 Grenoble	Lyudmila Titova; Soviet Union	Mary Meyers; United States	None awarded
1972 Sapporo	Anne Henning; United States	Vera Krasnova; Soviet Union	Lyudmila Titova; Soviet Union
1976 Innsbruck	Sheila Young; United States	Cathy Priestner; Canada	Tatyana Averina; Soviet Union
1980 Lake Placid	Karin Enke; East Germany	Leah Poulos-Mueller; United States	Natalya Petrusyova; Soviet Union
1984 Sarajevo	Christa Rothenburger; East Germany	Karin Enke; East Germany	Natalya Shive; Soviet Union
1988 Calgary	Bonnie Blair; United States	Christa Rothenburger; East Germany	Karin Kania; East Germany
1992 Albertville	Bonnie Blair; United States	Ye Qiaobo; China	Christa Luding-Rothenburger; Germany
1994 Lillehammer	Bonnie Blair; United States	Susan Auch; Canada	Franziska Schenk; Germany
1998 Nagano	Catriona Le May Doan; Canada	Susan Auch; Canada	Tomomi Okazaki; Japan
2002 Salt Lake City	Catriona Le May Doan; Canada	Monique Garbrecht-Enfeldt; Germany	Sabine Völker; Germany
2006 Turin	Svetlana Zhurova; Russia	Wang Manli; China	Ren Hui; China
2010 Vancouver	Lee Sang-hwa; South Korea	Jenny Wolf; Germany	Wang Beixing; China
2014 Sochi	Lee Sang-hwa; South Korea	Olga Fatkulina; Russia	Margot Boer; Netherlands
2018 PyeongChang	Nao Kodaira; Japan	Lee Sang-hwa; South Korea	Karolína Erbanová; Czech Republic
2022 Beijing	Erin Jackson; United States	Miho Takagi; Japan	Angelina Golikova; ROC
2026 Milano-Cortina	Femke Kok; Netherlands	Jutta Leerdam; Netherlands	Miho Takagi; Japan

Medals
Rank	Nation	Gold	Silver	Bronze	Total
1	United States	6	4	1	11
2	Soviet Union	2	3	5	7
3	Canada	2	3	0	5
4	East Germany	2	2	1	5
5	South Korea	2	1	0	3
6	Japan	1	1	2	4
7	Netherlands	1	1	1	3
8	Russia	1	1	0	2
9	United Team of Germany	1	0	0	1
10	Germany	0	2	3	5
11	China	0	2	2	4
12	Czech Republic	0	0	1	1
12	ROC	0	0	1	1
Total	13 nations	17	19	16	37

=== 1000 metres ===
Games	Gold	Silver	Bronze
1960 Squaw Valley	Klara Guseva; Soviet Union	Helga Haase; United Team of Germany	Tamara Rylova; Soviet Union
1964 Innsbruck	Lidiya Skoblikova; Soviet Union	Irina Yegorova; Soviet Union	Kaija Mustonen; Finland
1968 Grenoble	Carry Geijssen; Netherlands	Lyudmila Titova; Soviet Union	Dianne Holum; United States
1972 Sapporo	Monika Pflug; West Germany	Atje Keulen-Deelstra; Netherlands	Anne Henning; United States
1976 Innsbruck	Tatyana Averina; Soviet Union	Leah Poulos; United States	Sheila Young; United States
1980 Lake Placid	Natalya Petrusyova; Soviet Union	Leah Poulos-Mueller; United States	Sylvia Albrecht; East Germany
1984 Sarajevo	Karin Enke; East Germany	Andrea Schöne; East Germany	Natalya Petrusyova; Soviet Union
1988 Calgary	Christa Rothenburger; East Germany	Karin Kania; East Germany	Bonnie Blair; United States
1992 Albertville	Bonnie Blair; United States	Ye Qiaobo; China	Monique Garbrecht; Germany
1994 Lillehammer	Bonnie Blair; United States	Anke Baier; Germany	Ye Qiaobo; China
1998 Nagano	Marianne Timmer; Netherlands	Christine Witty; United States	Catriona Le May Doan; Canada
2002 Salt Lake City	Christine Witty; United States	Sabine Völker; Germany	Jennifer Rodriguez; United States
2006 Turin	Marianne Timmer; Netherlands	Cindy Klassen; Canada	Anni Friesinger; Germany
2010 Vancouver	Christine Nesbitt; Canada	Annette Gerritsen; Netherlands	Laurine van Riessen; Netherlands
2014 Sochi	Zhang Hong; China	Ireen Wüst; Netherlands	Margot Boer; Netherlands
2018 PyeongChang	Jorien ter Mors; Netherlands	Nao Kodaira; Japan	Miho Takagi; Japan
2022 Beijing	Miho Takagi; Japan	Jutta Leerdam; Netherlands	Brittany Bowe; United States
2026 Milan	Jutta Leerdam; Netherlands	Femke Kok; Netherlands	Miho Takagi; Japan

Medals
Rank	Nation	Gold	Silver	Bronze	Total
1	Netherlands	5	5	2	12
2	Soviet Union	4	2	2	8
3	United States	3	3	6	12
4	East Germany	2	2	1	5
5	Germany	1	2	2	5
6	Japan	1	1	2	4
7	Canada	1	1	1	3
7	China	1	1	1	3
9	Finland	0	0	1	1
Total	9 nations	18	18	18	54

=== 1500 metres ===
Games	Gold	Silver	Bronze
1960 Squaw Valley	Lidiya Skoblikova; Soviet Union	Elwira Seroczyńska; Poland	Helena Pilejczyk; Poland
1964 Innsbruck	Lidiya Skoblikova; Soviet Union	Kaija Mustonen; Finland	Berta Kolokoltseva; Soviet Union
1968 Grenoble	Kaija Mustonen; Finland	Carry Geijssen; Netherlands	Stien Kaiser; Netherlands
1972 Sapporo	Dianne Holum; United States	Stien Baas-Kaiser; Netherlands	Atje Keulen-Deelstra; Netherlands
1976 Innsbruck	Galina Stepanskaya; Soviet Union	Sheila Young; United States	Tatyana Averina; Soviet Union
1980 Lake Placid	Annie Borckink; Netherlands	Ria Visser; Netherlands	Sabine Becker; East Germany
1984 Sarajevo	Karin Enke; East Germany	Andrea Schöne; East Germany	Natalya Petrusyova; Soviet Union
1988 Calgary	Yvonne van Gennip; Netherlands	Karin Kania; East Germany	Andrea Ehrig; East Germany
1992 Albertville	Jacqueline Börner; Germany	Gunda Niemann; Germany	Seiko Hashimoto; Japan
1994 Lillehammer	Emese Hunyady; Austria	Svetlana Fedotkina; Russia	Gunda Niemann; Germany
1998 Nagano	Marianne Timmer; Netherlands	Gunda Niemann-Stirnemann; Germany	Christine Witty; United States
2002 Salt Lake City	Anni Friesinger; Germany	Sabine Völker; Germany	Jennifer Rodriguez; United States
2006 Turin	Cindy Klassen; Canada	Kristina Groves; Canada	Ireen Wüst; Netherlands
2010 Vancouver	Ireen Wüst; Netherlands	Kristina Groves; Canada	Martina Sáblíková; Czech Republic
2014 Sochi	Jorien ter Mors; Netherlands	Ireen Wüst; Netherlands	Lotte van Beek; Netherlands
2018 PyeongChang	Ireen Wüst; Netherlands	Miho Takagi; Japan	Marrit Leenstra; Netherlands
2022 Beijing	Ireen Wüst; Netherlands	Miho Takagi; Japan	Antoinette de Jong; Netherlands
2026 Milano Cortina	Antoinette Rijpma-de Jong; Netherlands	Ragne Wiklund; Norway	Valérie Maltais; Canada

Medals
Rank	Nation	Gold	Silver	Bronze	Total
1	Netherlands	8	4	6	18
2	Soviet Union	3	0	3	6
3	East Germany	2	4	3	9
4	Canada	1	2	1	4
5	United States	1	1	2	4
6	Finland	1	1	0	2
6	Germany	1	1	0	2
8	Austria	1	0	0	1
9	Japan	0	2	1	2
10	Poland	0	1	1	2
11	Norway	0	1	0	1
11	Russia	0	1	0	1
13	Czech Republic	0	0	1	1
Total	13 nations	18	18	18	54

=== 3000 metres ===
Games	Gold	Silver	Bronze
1960 Squaw Valley	Lidiya Skoblikova; Soviet Union	Valentina Stenina; Soviet Union	Eevi Huttunen; Finland
1964 Innsbruck	Lidiya Skoblikova; Soviet Union	Han Pil-Hwa; North Korea	None awarded
1964 Innsbruck	Lidiya Skoblikova; Soviet Union	Valentina Stenina; Soviet Union	None awarded
1968 Grenoble	Ans Schut; Netherlands	Kaija Mustonen; Finland	Stien Kaiser; Netherlands
1972 Sapporo	Stien Baas-Kaiser; Netherlands	Dianne Holum; United States	Atje Keulen-Deelstra; Netherlands
1976 Innsbruck	Tatyana Averina; Soviet Union	Andrea Mitscherlich; East Germany	Lisbeth Korsmo; Norway
1980 Lake Placid	Bjørg Eva Jensen; Norway	Sabine Becker; East Germany	Beth Heiden; United States
1984 Sarajevo	Andrea Schöne; East Germany	Karin Enke; East Germany	Gabi Schönbrunn; East Germany
1988 Calgary	Yvonne van Gennip; Netherlands	Andrea Ehrig; East Germany	Gabi Zange; East Germany
1992 Albertville	Gunda Niemann; Germany	Heike Warnicke; Germany	Emese Hunyady; Austria
1994 Lillehammer	Svetlana Bazhanova; Russia	Emese Hunyady; Austria	Claudia Pechstein; Germany
1998 Nagano	Gunda Niemann-Stirnemann; Germany	Claudia Pechstein; Germany	Anni Friesinger; Germany
2002 Salt Lake City	Claudia Pechstein; Germany	Renate Groenewold; Netherlands	Cindy Klassen; Canada
2006 Turin	Ireen Wüst; Netherlands	Renate Groenewold; Netherlands	Cindy Klassen; Canada
2010 Vancouver	Martina Sáblíková; Czech Republic	Stephanie Beckert; Germany	Kristina Groves; Canada
2014 Sochi	Ireen Wüst; Netherlands	Martina Sáblíková; Czech Republic	Olga Graf; Russia
2018 PyeongChang	Carlijn Achtereekte; Netherlands	Ireen Wüst; Netherlands	Antoinette de Jong; Netherlands
2022 Beijing	Irene Schouten; Netherlands	Francesca Lollobrigida; Italy	Isabelle Weidemann; Canada
2026 Milan Cortina	Francesca Lollobrigida; Italy	Ragne Wiklund; Norway	Valérie Maltais; Canada

- Medals:

Medals
Rank	Nation	Gold	Silver	Bronze	Total
1	Netherlands	7	3	3	13
2	Soviet Union	4	2	0	6
3	Germany	3	3	2	8
4	East Germany	1	4	2	7
5	Norway	1	1	1	3
6	Czech Republic	1	1	0	2
6	Italy	1	1	0	2
8	Russia	1	0	1	2
9	Austria	0	1	1	2
10	Finland	0	1	1	2
10	United States	0	1	1	2
11	North Korea	0	1	0	1
12	Canada	0	0	5	5
Total	13 nations	18	19	17	54

=== 5000 metres ===
Games	Gold	Silver	Bronze
1988 Calgary	Yvonne van Gennip; Netherlands	Andrea Ehrig; East Germany	Gabi Zange; East Germany
1992 Albertville	Gunda Niemann; Germany	Heike Warnicke; Germany	Claudia Pechstein; Germany
1994 Lillehammer	Claudia Pechstein; Germany	Gunda Niemann; Germany	Hiromi Yamamoto; Japan
1998 Nagano	Claudia Pechstein; Germany	Gunda Niemann-Stirnemann; Germany	Lyudmila Prokasheva; Kazakhstan
2002 Salt Lake City	Claudia Pechstein; Germany	Gretha Smit; Netherlands	Clara Hughes; Canada
2006 Turin	Clara Hughes; Canada	Claudia Pechstein; Germany	Cindy Klassen; Canada
2010 Vancouver	Martina Sáblíková; Czech Republic	Stephanie Beckert; Germany	Clara Hughes; Canada
2014 Sochi	Martina Sáblíková; Czech Republic	Ireen Wüst; Netherlands	Carien Kleibeuker; Netherlands
2018 PyeongChang	Esmee Visser; Netherlands	Martina Sáblíková; Czech Republic	Natalya Voronina; Olympic Athletes from Russia
2022 Beijing	Irene Schouten; Netherlands	Isabelle Weidemann; Canada	Martina Sáblíková; Czech Republic
2026 Milano Cortina	Francesca Lollobrigida; Italy	Merel Conijn; Netherlands	Ragne Wiklund; Norway

Medals
Rank	Nation	Gold	Silver	Bronze	Total
1	Germany	4	6	2	10
2	Netherlands	3	3	1	7
3	Czech Republic	2	1	1	4
4	Canada	1	1	3	5
5	Italy	1	0	0	1
6	Japan	0	0	1	1
6	Kazakhstan	0	0	1	1
6	Olympic Athletes from Russia	0	0	1	1
6	Norway	0	0	1	1
Total	9 nations	11	11	11	33

=== Mass start ===
Games	Gold	Silver	Bronze
2018 PyeongChang	Nana Takagi; Japan	Kim Bo-reum; South Korea	Irene Schouten; Netherlands
2022 Beijing	Irene Schouten; Netherlands	Ivanie Blondin; Canada	Francesca Lollobrigida; Italy
2026 Milan Cortina	Marijke Groenewoud; Netherlands	Ivanie Blondin; Canada	Mia Manganello; United States

Medals
Rank	Nation	Gold	Silver	Bronze	Total
1	Netherlands	2	0	1	3
2	Japan	1	0	0	1
3	Canada	0	2	0	1
4	South Korea	0	1	0	1
5	Italy	0	0	1	1
5	United States	0	0	1	1
Total	6 nations	3	3	3	9

=== Team pursuit ===
Games	Gold	Silver	Bronze
2006 Turin	Germany; Daniela Anschütz-Thoms; Anni Friesinger; Lucille Opitz; Claudia Pechstein; Sabine Völker	Canada; Kristina Groves; Clara Hughes; Cindy Klassen; Christine Nesbitt; Shannon Rempel	Russia; Yekaterina Abramova; Varvara Barysheva; Galina Likhachova; Yekaterina Lobysheva; Svetlana Vysokova
2010 Vancouver	Germany; Daniela Anschütz-Thoms; Stephanie Beckert; Anni Friesinger-Postma; Katrin Mattscherodt	Japan; Masako Hozumi; Nao Kodaira; Maki Tabata	Poland; Katarzyna Bachleda-Curuś; Katarzyna Woźniak; Luiza Złotkowska
2014 Sochi	Netherlands; Lotte van Beek; Marrit Leenstra; Jorien ter Mors; Ireen Wüst	Poland; Katarzyna Bachleda-Curuś; Natalia Czerwonka; Katarzyna Woźniak; Luiza Złotkowska	Russia; Olga Graf; Yekaterina Lobysheva; Yekaterina Shikhova; Yuliya Skokova
2018 PyeongChang	Japan; Miho Takagi; Ayano Sato; Nana Takagi; Ayaka Kikuchi	Netherlands; Marrit Leenstra; Ireen Wüst; Antoinette de Jong; Lotte van Beek	United States; Heather Bergsma; Brittany Bowe; Mia Manganello; Carlijn Schoutens
2022 Beijing	Canada; Ivanie Blondin; Valérie Maltais; Isabelle Weidemann	Japan; Ayano Sato; Miho Takagi; Nana Takagi	Netherlands; Marijke Groenewoud; Ireen Wüst; Antoinette de Jong; Irene Schouten
2026 Milano Cortina	Canada; Ivanie Blondin; Valérie Maltais; Isabelle Weidemann	Netherlands; Joy Beune; Marijke Groenewoud; Antoinette Rijpma-de Jong	Japan; Miho Takagi; Ayano Sato; Hana Noake; Momoka Horikawa

- Medals:

Medals
Rank	Nation	Gold	Silver	Bronze	Total
1	Germany	2	0	0	2
2	Japan	1	2	0	3
3	Netherlands	1	1	1	3
4	Canada	1	1	0	2
5	Poland	0	1	1	1
6	Russia	0	0	2	2
7	United States	0	0	1	1
Total	7 nations	5	5	5	15

== Discontinued ==
=== Men's all-round ===
Games	Gold	Silver	Bronze
1924 Chamonix	Clas Thunberg; Finland	Roald Larsen; Norway	Julius Skutnabb; Finland

- Medals:

Rank	Nation	Gold	Silver	Bronze	Total
1	Finland	1	0	1	2
2	Norway	0	1	0	1

== Statistics ==
=== Athlete medal leaders ===
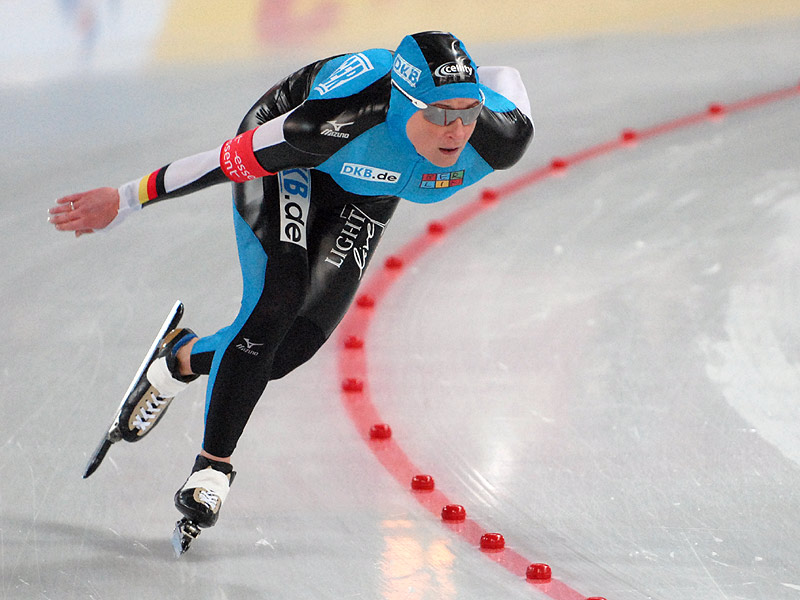
German Claudia Pechstein is second in most medals won.

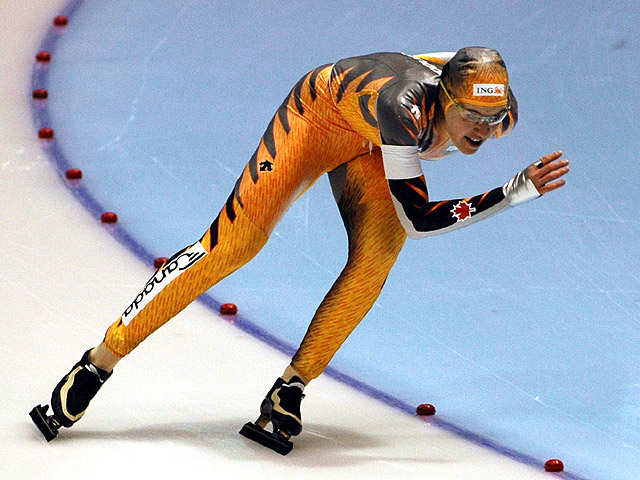
Canadian Clara Hughes (who won two bronze medals at the 1996 Summer Olympics) is the only athlete to have won multiple medals at both the Summer and Winter Olympics.

Athlete	Nation	Olympics	Gold	Silver	Bronze	Total
Ireen Wüst	Netherlands	2006–2022	**6**	**5**	2	**13**
Miho Takagi	Japan	2010–**2026**	2	4	**4**	10
Claudia Pechstein	Germany	1992–2022	5	2	2	9
Sven Kramer	Netherlands	2006–2022	4	2	3	9
Karin Enke	East Germany	1980–1988	3	4	1	8
Gunda Niemann	Germany	1988–1998	3	4	1	8
Clas Thunberg	Finland	1924–1928	5	1	1	7
Ivar Ballangrud	Norway	1928–1936	4	2	1	7
Martina Sáblíková	Czech Republic	2006–2022	3	2	2	7
Andrea Schöne	East Germany	1976–1988	1	**5**	1	7
Lidiya Skoblikova	Soviet Union	1960–1968	**6**	0	0	6
Bonnie Blair	United States	1984–1994	5	0	1	6
Lee Seung-Hoon	South Korea	2010–**2022**	2	3	1	6
Cindy Klassen	Canada	2002–2006	1	2	3	6
Antoinette Rijpma-de Jong	Netherlands	2018–**2026**	1	2	3	6
Rintje Ritsma	Netherlands	1992–2006	0	2	**4**	6
Roald Larsen	Norway	1924–1928	0	2	**4**	6
Eric Heiden	United States	1976–1980	5	0	0	5
Johann Olav Koss	Norway	1992–1994	4	1	0	5
Yevgeny Grishin	Soviet Union	1956–1968	4	1	0	5
Irene Schouten	Netherlands	2018–2022	3	0	2	5
Anni Friesinger-Postma	Germany	1998–2010	3	0	2	5
Knut Johannesen	Norway	1956–1964	2	2	1	5
Jorrit Bergsma	Netherlands	2014–**2026**	2	1	2	5
Chad Hedrick	United States	2006–2010	1	2	2	5

=== Medals per year ===
==== Key ====
= Countries that did not participate in the Olympic Winter Games in that year, or didn't exist at the time.

- Countries in **bold** appeared in all Olympic Winter Games
- Numbers in **bold** indicate the highest medal count at that year's Olympic Winter Games.

Country	24	28	32	36	48	52	56	60	64	68	72	76	80	84	88	92	94	98	02	06	10	14	18	22	26	Total
Austria	–	–	–	1	–	–	–	–	–	–	–	–	–	–	2	1	2	–	–	–	–	–	–	–		6
Belarus																	1	–	–	–	–	–	–	–		1
Belgium	–	–	–	–	–	–	–		–		–	–	–	–	–	–	–	1	–	–	–	–	1	1		3
Canada	–	–	5	–	–	1	–	–	–	–	–	1	1	3	–	–	1	5	3	8	5	2	2	5	5	47
China													–	–	–	2	1	–	–	2	1	1	1	1		9
Czech Republic																	–	–	–	–	3	2	2	1		8
Finland	**8**	4	–	4	2	–	1	1	2	2	–	–	–	–	–	–	–	–	–	–	–	–	–	–		24
Germany		–	–	–		–										**11**	**6**	6	**8**	3	4	−	–	–		38
United Team of Germany							–	2	–																	2
East Germany										–	–	1	4	**11**	**13**											29
West Germany										1	2	–	–	–	–											3
Italy	–	–	–	–	–	–	–	–	–	–	–	–	–	–	–	–	–	–	–	3	–	–	1	3		7
Japan		–	–	–		–	–	–	–	–	–	–	–	1	1	4	2	3	1	–	3	–	6	5		26
Kazakhstan																	–	1	–	–	–	–	–	−		1
Netherlands		–		–	–	3	–	1	1	**9**	**9**	5	4	–	7	4	4	**11**	**8**	**9**	**7**	**23**	**16**	**12**		**133**
North Korea									1		–			–	–	–		–		–	–		–			1
Norway	7	**6**	2	**6**	**6**	**6**	2	3	7	4	4	5	7	1	–	5	5	1	2	–	1	–	4	3		87
Poland	–	–	–	–	–	–	–	2	–	–	–	–	–	–	–	–	–	–	–	–	1	3	–	–		6
Russia																	5	–	–	3	2	3				13
Olympic Athletes from Russia																							1			1
South Korea					–		–	–	–	–	–	–	–	–	–	1	–	–	–	1	5	2	7	4		20
ROC																								2		2
Soviet Union							**7**	**12**	**12**	2	3	**9**	4	9	2											60
Sweden	–	–	–	–	3	1	2	1	1	2	2	–	–	2	2	–	–	–	–	–	–	–	–	2		18
United States	1	1	**5**	1	2	2	–	2	1	5	4	6	**8**	–	3	2	3	2	**8**	7	4	–	1	3		71
**Year**	24	28	32	36	48	52	56	60	64	68	72	76	80	84	88	92	94	98	02	06	10	14	18	22	26	–

=== Medal sweep events ===
These are podium sweep events in which athletes from one NOC won all three medals.

Games	Event	NOC	Gold	Silver	Bronze
1964 Innsbruck	Women's 500 meters	Soviet Union	Lidiya Skoblikova	Irina Yegorova	Tatyana Sidorova
1964 Innsbruck	Men's 5000 meters	Norway	Knut Johannesen	Per Ivar Moe	Fred Anton Maier
1984 Sarajevo	Women's 3000 meters	East Germany	Andrea Schöne	Karin Enke	Gabi Schönbrunn
1992 Albertville	Women's 5000 meters	Germany	Gunda Niemann	Heike Warnicke	Claudia Pechstein
1998 Nagano	Women's 3000 meters	Germany	Gunda Niemann-Stirnemann	Claudia Pechstein	Anni Friesinger
1998 Nagano	Men's 10,000 meters	Netherlands	Gianni Romme	Bob de Jong	Rintje Ritsma
2014 Sochi	Men's 5000 meters	Netherlands	Sven Kramer	Jan Blokhuijsen	Jorrit Bergsma
2014 Sochi	Men's 500 meters	Netherlands	Michel Mulder	Jan Smeekens	Ronald Mulder
2014 Sochi	Women's 1500 meters *	Netherlands	Jorien ter Mors	Ireen Wüst	Lotte van Beek
2014 Sochi	Men's 10,000 meters	Netherlands	Jorrit Bergsma	Sven Kramer	Bob de Jong
2018 Pyeongchang	Women's 3000 meters	Netherlands	Carlijn Achtereekte	Ireen Wüst	Antoinette de Jong

^{*}In the women's 1500 meters event at the 2014 Winter Olympics, Marrit Leenstra of the Netherlands finished in fourth position, making this the first, and only, time in Olympic speed skating history that athletes from one country have taken all of the top four positions in an event.

== See also ==
- World Speed Skating Championships
- List of multiple Winter Olympic medallists
