= Speed skating at the 1968 Winter Olympics – Women's 1500 metres =

Women's 1500 metres speed skating at the X Olympic Winter Games
- Pictogram for speed skating
- Venue: L'Anneau de Vitesse
- Date: 10 February 1968
- Competitors: 30 from 12 nations
- Winning time: 2:22.4 OR

Medalists
1st place, gold medalist(s)		Kaija Mustonen	Finland
2nd place, silver medalist(s)		Carry Geijssen	Netherlands
3rd place, bronze medalist(s)		Stien Kaiser	Netherlands

The women's 1500 metres in speed skating at the 1968 Winter Olympics took place on February 10, at the L'Anneau de Vitesse.

== Records ==
Prior to this competition, the existing world and Olympic records were as follows:

World record	Inga Artamonova (URS)	2:19.0	Alma-Ata, Kazakh SSR, Soviet Union	27 January 1962
Olympic record	Lidia Skoblikova (URS)	2:22.6	Innsbruck, Austria	31 January 1964

The following new Olympic record was set.

Date	Athlete	Time	OR	WR
10 February	Kaija Mustonen (FIN)	2:22.4	OR	

== Results ==
Rank	Athlete	Country	Time	Notes
1st place, gold medalist(s)	Kaija Mustonen	Finland	2:22.4	OR
2nd place, silver medalist(s)	Carry Geijssen	Netherlands	2:22.7	
3rd place, bronze medalist(s)	Stien Kaiser	Netherlands	2:24.5	
4	Sigrid Sundby-Dybedahl	Norway	2:25.2	
5	Lāsma Kauniste	Soviet Union	2:25.4	
6	Kaija-Liisa Keskivitikka	Finland	2:25.8	
7	Lyudmila Titova	Soviet Union	2:26.8	
8	Ruth Schleiermacher	East Germany	2:27.1	
9	Christina Lindblom-Scherling	Sweden	2:27.5	
9	Hildegard Sellhuber	West Germany	2:27.5	
11	Lidiya Skoblikova	Soviet Union	2:27.6	
12	Ans Schut	Netherlands	2:28.3	
13	Dianne Holum	United States	2:28.5	
14	Martine Ivangine	France	2:29.9	
14	Kari Kåring	Norway	2:29.9	
16	Jeanne Ashworth	United States	2:30.3	
17	Lisbeth Korsmo-Berg	Norway	2:30.7	
18	Christina Karlsson	Sweden	2:31.4	
18	Sachiko Saito	Japan	2:31.4	
20	Ylva Hedlund	Sweden	2:31.5	
21	Doreen McCannell	Canada	2:32.2	
22	Arja Kantola	Finland	2:33.2	
23	Kaname Ide	Japan	2:34.2	
24	Marcia Parsons	Canada	2:34.4	
25	Jeanne Omelenchuk	United States	2:35.5	
26	Jitsuko Saito	Japan	2:36.6	
27	Kim Gwi-Jin	South Korea	2:36.7	
28	Marie-Louise Perrenoud	France	2:39.2	
29	Patricia Demartini	France	2:40.6	
30	Paula Dufter	West Germany	2:45.2	
