= Speed skating at the 1968 Winter Olympics – Women's 3000 metres =

Women's 3000 metres speed skating at the X Olympic Winter Games
- Pictogram for speed skating
- Venue: L'Anneau de Vitesse
- Date: 12 February 1968
- Competitors: 26 from 12 nations
- Winning time: 4:56.2 OR

Medalists
1st place, gold medalist(s)		Ans Schut; Netherlands
2nd place, silver medalist(s)		Kaija Mustonen; Finland
3rd place, bronze medalist(s)		Stien Kaiser; Netherlands

The women's 3000 metres in speed skating at the 1968 Winter Olympics took place on 12 February, at the L'Anneau de Vitesse.

== Records ==
Prior to this competition, the existing world and Olympic records were as follows:

World record	Stien Kaiser (NED)	4:54.6	Davos, Switzerland	3 February 1968
Olympic record	Lidia Skoblikova (URS)	5:14.3	Squaw Valley, United States	23 February 1960

The following new Olympic record was set.

Date	Athlete	Time	OR	WR
12 February	Ans Schut (NED)	4:56.2	OR	

== Results ==
Rank	Athlete	Country	Time	Notes
1st place, gold medalist(s)	Ans Schut	Netherlands	4:56.2	OR
2nd place, silver medalist(s)	Kaija Mustonen	Finland	5:01.0	
3rd place, bronze medalist(s)	Stien Kaiser	Netherlands	5:01.3	
4	Kaija-Liisa Keskivitikka	Finland	5:03.9	
5	Wil Burgmeijer	Netherlands	5:05.1	
6	Lidiya Skoblikova	Soviet Union	5:08.0	
7	Christina Lindblom-Scherling	Sweden	5:09.8	
8	Anna Sablina	Soviet Union	5:12.5	
9	Sigrid Sundby-Dybedahl	Norway	5:13.3	
10	Jeanne Ashworth	United States	5:14.0	
11	Jeanne Omelenchuk	United States	5:14.9	
12	Lāsma Kauniste	Soviet Union	5:16.0	
13	Christina Karlsson	Sweden	5:17.2	
14	Toy Dorgan	United States	5:17.6	
15	Martine Ivangine	France	5:19.3	
16	Lisbeth Korsmo-Berg	Norway	5:19.6	
17	Kari Kåring	Norway	5:20.6	
18	Doreen McCannell	Canada	5:21.5	
19	Paula Dufter	West Germany	5:27.0	
20	Jitsuko Saito	Japan	5:27.8	
21	Kaname Ide	Japan	5:27.9	
22	Kim Gwi-Jin	South Korea	5:29.5	
22	Marcia Parsons	Canada	5:29.5	
24	Arja Kantola	Finland	5:30.7	
25	Marie-Louise Perrenoud	France	5:41.7	
26	Trish Tipper	Great Britain	5:49.0	
