= Speed skating at the 1968 Winter Olympics – Women's 1000 metres =

Women's 1000 metres speed skating at the X Olympic Winter Games
- Pictogram for speed skating
- Venue: L'Anneau de Vitesse
- Date: 11 February 1968
- Competitors: 29 from 12 nations
- Winning time: 1:32.6 OR

Medalists
1st place, gold medalist(s)		Carry Geijssen	Netherlands
2nd place, silver medalist(s)		Lyudmila Titova	Soviet Union
3rd place, bronze medalist(s)		Dianne Holum	United States

The women's 1000 metres in speed skating at the 1968 Winter Olympics took place on 11 February, at the L'Anneau de Vitesse.

== Records ==
Prior to this competition, the existing world and Olympic records were as follows:

World record	Lidia Skoblikova (URS)	1:31.8	Karuizawa, Japan	22 February 1963
Olympic record	Lidia Skoblikova (URS)	1:33.2	Innsbruck, Austria	1 February 1964

The following new Olympic record was set.

Date	Athlete	Time	OR	WR
11 February	Carry Geijssen (NED)	1:32.6	OR	

== Results ==
Rank	Athlete	Country	Time	Notes
1st place, gold medalist(s)	Carry Geijssen	Netherlands	1:32.6	OR
2nd place, silver medalist(s)	Lyudmila Titova	Soviet Union	1:32.9	
3rd place, bronze medalist(s)	Dianne Holum	United States	1:33.4	
4	Kaija Mustonen	Finland	1:33.6	
5	Irina Yegorova	Soviet Union	1:34.4	
6	Sigrid Sundby-Dybedahl	Norway	1:34.5	
7	Jeanne Ashworth	United States	1:34.7	
8	Kaija-Liisa Keskivitikka	Finland	1:34.8	
9	Kirsti Biermann	Norway	1:35.0	
10	Stien Kaiser	Netherlands	1:35.2	
11	Lāsma Kauniste	Soviet Union	1:35.3	
12	Ruth Schleiermacher	East Germany	1:35.6	
13	Lisbeth Korsmo-Berg	Norway	1:36.8	
13	Ellie van den Brom	Netherlands	1:36.8	
15	Christina Lindblom-Scherling	Sweden	1:36.9	
16	Hildegard Sellhuber	West Germany	1:37.2	
17	Martine Ivangine	France	1:37.4	
17	Evi Sappl	West Germany	1:37.4	
19	Ylva Hedlund	Sweden	1:37.5	
20	Doreen McCannell	Canada	1:37.6	
21	Marcia Parsons	Canada	1:37.7	
22	Arja Kantola	Finland	1:37.9	
23	Jenny Fish	United States	1:38.4	
24	Marie-Louise Perrenoud	France	1:39.3	
25	Misae Takeda	Japan	1:40.4	
26	Sachiko Saito	Japan	1:41.0	
27	Wendy Thompson	Canada	1:41.1	
28	Patricia Demartini	France	1:44.6	
29	Trish Tipper	Great Britain	1:46.5	
