= Netherlands at the 1968 Winter Olympics =

- Flag of the Netherlands
- IOC code: NED (HOL used at these Games)
- NOC: Dutch Olympic Committee

in Grenoble
- Competitors: 9 (4 men, 5 women) in 1 sport
- Flag bearer: Stien Baas-Kaiser (speedskating)
- Medals: Gold 3 Silver 3 Bronze 3 Total 9

Winter Olympics appearances (overview)
- 1928; 1932; 1936; 1948; 1952; 1956; 1960; 1964; 1968; 1972; 1976; 1980; 1984; 1988; 1992; 1994; 1998; 2002; 2006; 2010; 2014; 2018; 2022; 2026

Athletes from the Netherlands competed at the 1968 Winter Olympics in Grenoble, France.

== Medalists ==
Medal	Name	Sport	Event
Gold	Kees Verkerk	Speed skating	Men's 1500 metres
Gold	Carry Geijssen	Speed skating	Women's 1000 metres
Gold	Ans Schut	Speed skating	Women's 3000 metres
Silver	Ard Schenk	Speed skating	Men's 1500 metres
Silver	Kees Verkerk	Speed skating	Men's 5000 metres
Silver	Carry Geijssen	Speed skating	Women's 1500 metres
Bronze	Peter Nottet	Speed skating	Men's 5000 metres
Bronze	Stien Baas-Kaiser	Speed skating	Women's 1500 metres
Bronze	Stien Baas-Kaiser	Speed skating	Women's 3000 metres

== Speed skating ==
Men

Event	Athlete	Race	
Event	Athlete	Time	Rank
500 m	Jan Bols	DNF	–
500 m	Peter Nottet	42.4	30
500 m	Ard Schenk	41.1	13
500 m	Kees Verkerk	42.6	33
1500 m	Jan Bols	2:07.8	16
1500 m	Peter Nottet	2:06.3	9
1500 m	Ard Schenk	2:05.0	2nd place, silver medalist(s)
1500 m	Kees Verkerk	2:03.4 OR	1st place, gold medalist(s)
5000 m	Jan Bols	7:33.1	8
5000 m	Peter Nottet	7:25.5	3rd place, bronze medalist(s)
5000 m	Kees Verkerk	7:23.2	2nd place, silver medalist(s)
10,000 m	Jan Bols	16:09.5	13
10,000 m	Peter Nottet	15:54.7	8
10,000 m	Kees Verkerk	15:33.9	5

Women

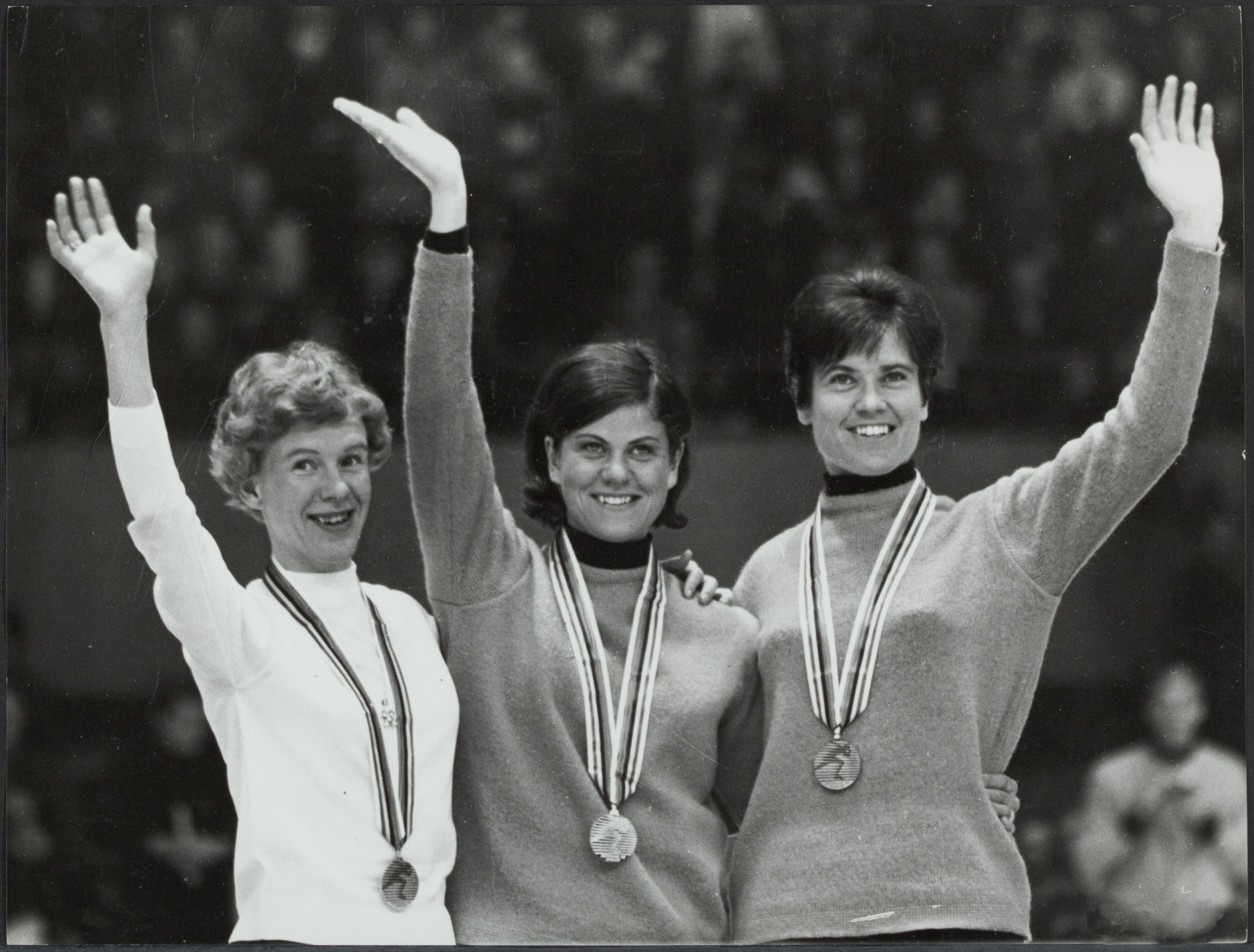
Ans Schut won gold and Stien Kaiser bronze in the 3000 m

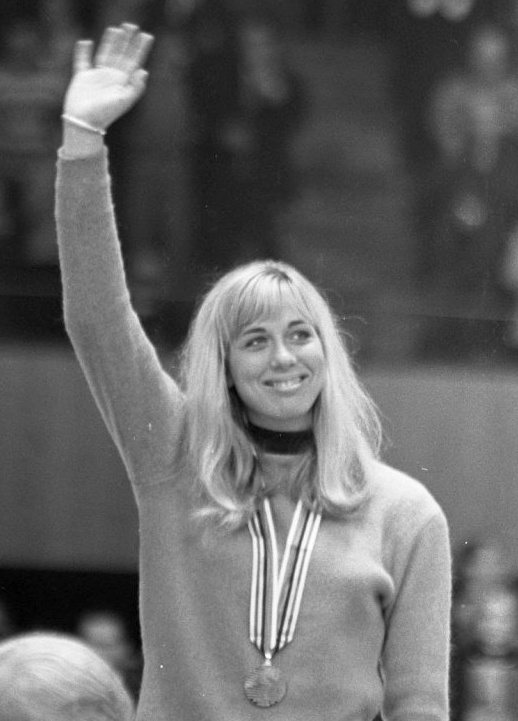
Carry Geijssen won gold in the 1000m and silver in the 1500 m

Event	Athlete	Race	
Event	Athlete	Time	Rank
500 m	Stien Baas-Kaiser	47.6	14
500 m	Ellie van den Brom	46.6	5
500 m	Wil Burgmeijer	47.8	16
1000 m	Stien Baas-Kaiser	1:35.2	10
1000 m	Ellie van den Brom	1:36.8	13
1000 m	Carry Geijssen	1:32.6 OR	1st place, gold medalist(s)
1500 m	Stien Baas-Kaiser	2:24.5	3rd place, bronze medalist(s)
1500 m	Carry Geijssen	2:22.7	2nd place, silver medalist(s)
1500 m	Ans Schut	2:28.3	12
3000 m	Stien Baas-Kaiser	5:01.3	3rd place, bronze medalist(s)
3000 m	Wil Burgmeijer	5:05.1	5
3000 m	Ans Schut	4:56.2 OR	1st place, gold medalist(s)
