= Henk van der Grift =

Dutch speed skater (born 1935)

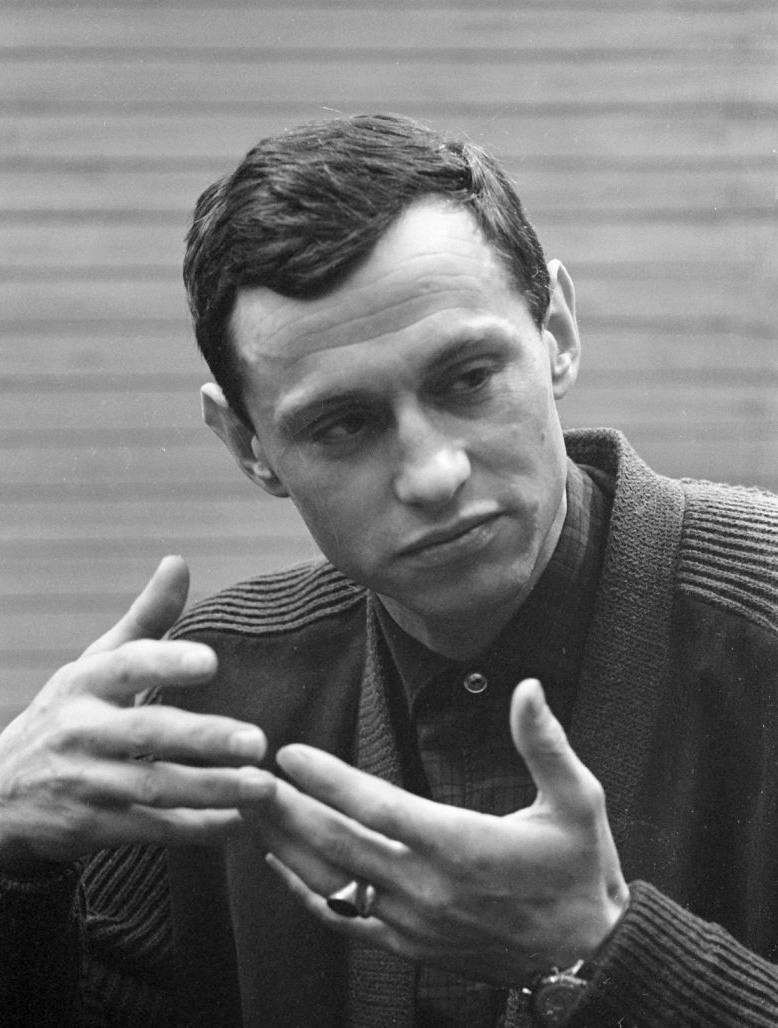
- Henk van der Grift in 1962

Personal information
- Born: 25 December 1935 (age 90) Breukelen, the Netherlands

Sport
- Country: Netherlands
- Sport: Speed skating
Medal record
Men's speed skating
Representing Netherlands
World Allround Championships
Gold medal – first place	1961 Gothenburg	Allround
Silver medal – second place	1962 Moscow	Allround
European Allround Championships
Silver medal – second place	1961 Helsinki	Allround

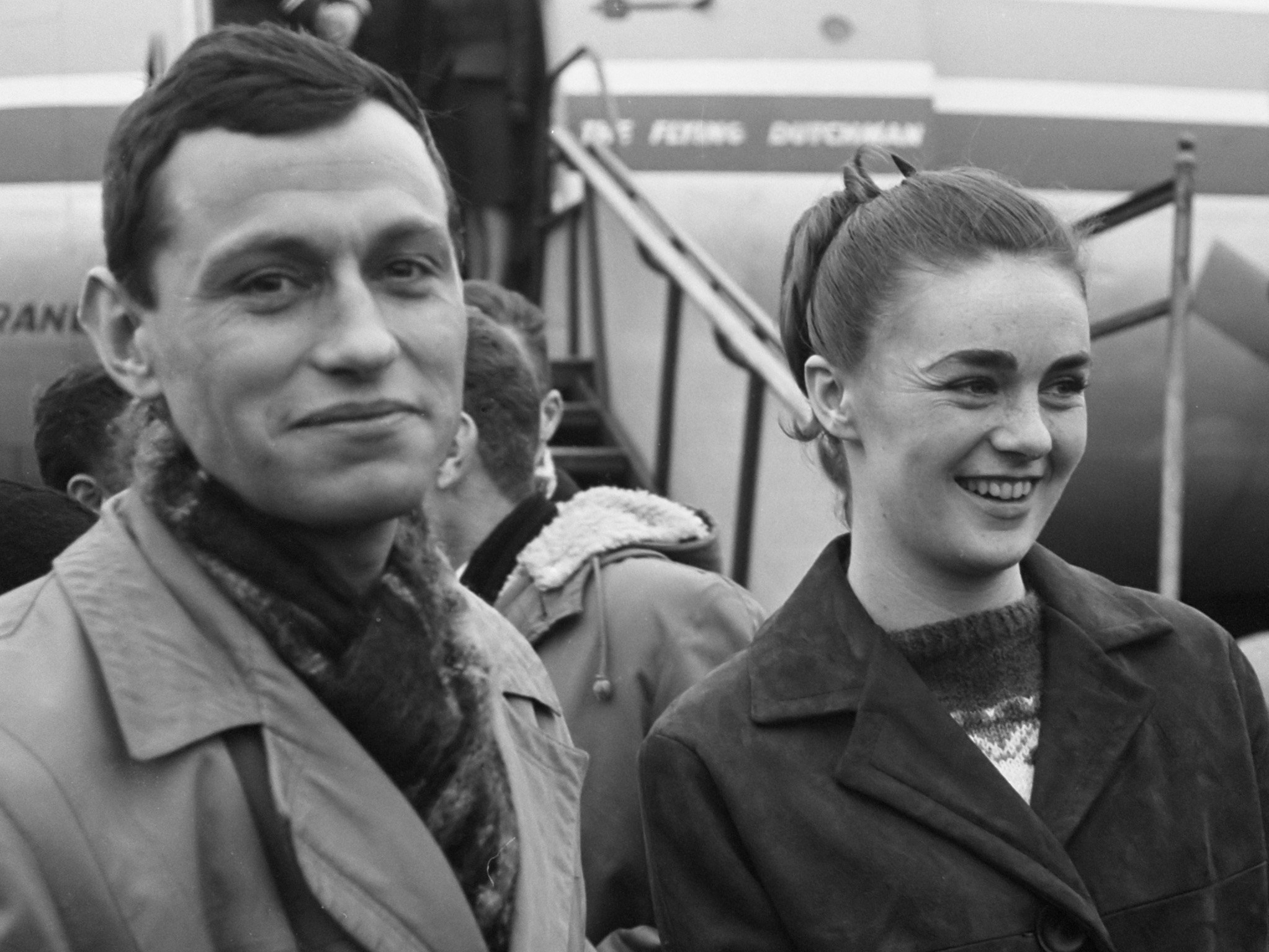
Henk van der Grift with Reyka van Zijtveld in February 1962; they married on 22 August 1962.

Hendrik ("Henk") van der Grift (born 25 December 1935) is a retired Dutch speed skater.

At the 1960 Winter Olympics van der Grift finished 10th on the 500 m and fell on the 1500 m. Not satisfied with training facilities in the Netherlands, he lived in Norway for a while, working as a car mechanic. The superior training facilities in Norway paid off and van der Grift won silver at the 1961 European Allround Championships behind Olympic Champion Viktor Kosichkin. This was the first Dutch medal in international championships in eight years and it made van der Grift one of the favourites for the World Allround Championships.

And van der Grift delivered: in what turned out to be his greatest year, he became the 1961 World Allround Champion in Gothenburg. On the 500 m during those championships, he finished second behind Soviet sprinter Yevgeny Grishin. He then lost many points on the 5000 m, but he overcame that deficit by winning the 1500 m. On the final distance (the 10000 m), he seemed to be losing his lead, surrendering one second each lap to Viktor Kosichkin. But van der Grift managed to skate his final two laps fast enough to retain his lead, narrowly edging out Kosichkin by a margin of just 0.162 points (equivalent to 3.24 seconds of difference on the 10000 m).

His victory made van der Grift the first Dutch World Allround Champion in more than 55 years – Coen de Koning had been the last in 1905. As a result of his victory, he was elected Dutch Sportsman of the year (a title shared with Judo giant Anton Geesink) and he received the 1961 Oscar Mathisen Award.

In 1962, van der Grift became Dutch Allround Champion, but he did not manage to successfully defend his World Champion title that year – after three of the four distances, van der Grift was in second place behind Boris Stenin, but despite Stenin's bad result on the final distance and van der Grift overtaking Stenin, van der Grift still finished second behind Kosichkin. The following season, he fell ill and ended his speed skating career.

== Personal records ==
Personal records
Men's Speed skating
Event	Result	Date	Location	Notes
500 meter	41.2	24 February 1960	Squaw Valley	
1000 meter	1:30.7	6 November 1963	Deventer	
1500 meter	2:11.7	12 February 1961	Hamar	
3000 meter	4:41.9	11 February 1961	Hamar	
5000 meter	8:11.8	12 February 1961	Hamar	
10000 meter	16:53.6	19 February 1961	Gothenburg	

Van der Grift has a score of 175.960 points on the Adelskalendern.

== Tournament overview ==
Season	Dutch Championships Allround	European Championships Allround	Olympic Games	World Championships Allround
1954-55	HEERENVEEN 13th 500m 19th 5000m 20th 1500m DNQ 10000m NC overall(19th)			
1955–56	KRALINGEN 30th 500m 20th 5000m 18th 1500m DNQ 10000m NC overall(24th)			
1956–57				
1957–58				
1958–59				
1959–60		OSLO 5th 500m 24th 5000m 12th 1500m DNQ 10000m NC overall(20th)	SQUAW VALLEY 10th 500m DNF 1500m	DAVOS 5th 500m 19th 5000m 5th 1500m 16th 10000m 11th overall
1960–61		HELSINKI (silver) 500m 7th 5000m (bronze) 1500m 7th 10000m (silver) overall		GOTHENBURG (silver) 500m 12th 5000m (gold) 1500m (bronze) 10000m (gold) overall
1961–62	GRONINGEN (gold) 500m (gold) 5000m (gold) 1500m (gold) 10000m (gold) overall	OSLO (bronze) 500m 13th 5000m (bronze) 1500m 8th 10000m 4th overall		MOSCOW (bronze) 500m 8th 5000m (silver) 1500m 8th 10000m (silver) overall
1962–63		GOTHENBURG 10th 500m 29th 5000m 23rd 1500m DNQ 1000m NC overall(24th)		KARUIZAWA 19th 500m 38th 5000m 28th 1500m DNQ 10000m NC overall(30th)

- NC = No classification
- DNQ = Did not qualify

== Medals won ==
Championship	Gold (gold)	Silver (silver)	Bronze (bronze)
Dutch Allround	1	0	0
European Allround	0	1	0
Olympic Games	0	0	0
World Allround	1	1	0

== Dutch records established ==
Nr.	Event	Result	Date	Location
1	1500 meter	2:23.2	25 February 1962	Amsterdam
2	Big combination	204.368	25 February 1962	Amsterdam
3	500 meter	43.2	10 March 1962	Amsterdam
4	5000 meter	8:18.9	10 March 1962	Amsterdam
5	1500 meter	2:18.6	11 March 1962	Amsterdam
6	10.000 meter	17:58.2	11 March 1962	Amsterdam
7	Big combination	193.200	11 March 1962	Amsterdam
8	1000 meter	1:30.7	6 November 1963	Deventer

Note: Prior to season 1967–1968 Dutch national records would be recognized only if skated in the Netherlands

Awards
Preceded by (Netherlands) Eef Kamerbeek	Dutch Sportsman of the Year; 1961; With: Anton Geesink	Succeeded by (Netherlands) Henk Nijdam
Preceded by (Soviet Union) Boris Stenin	Oscar Mathisen Award; 1961	Succeeded by (Sweden) Jonny Nilsson
