= Toy Dorgan =

American speed skater

Personal information
- Born: December 29, 1946 (age 78); Springfield, Illinois, United States

Sport
- Sport: Speed skating

Toy Dorgan (born December 29, 1946) is an American speed skater. She competed in the women's 3000 metres at the 1968 Winter Olympics.
