= Kari Kåring =

Norwegian speed skater

Kari Elida Kåring (born 3 December 1948) is a Norwegian speed skater and sports official.

She was born in Lillehammer, and represented the club Lillehammer SK. She participated in the 1968 Winter Olympics, placing fourteenth (tied) in the 1500 metres and seventeenth in the 3000 metres.

As an official she is best known for taking the Judge's Oath at the 1994 Winter Olympics in Lillehammer.
