= Hirofumi Otsuka =

Japanese speed skater (born 1947)

Personal information
- Nationality: Japanese
- Born: 8 October 1947 (age 78) Hokkaido, Japan

Sport
- Sport: Speed skating

Hirofumi Otsuka (大塚 博文, Ōtsuka Hirofumi; born 8 October 1947) is a Japanese speed skater. He competed in the men's 10,000 metres event at the 1968 Winter Olympics.
