= Lee Ik-hwan =

South Korean speed skater

Personal information
- Nationality: South Korean
- Born: 17 January 1946 (age 79); Cheongsong, Korea

Sport
- Sport: Speed skating

Lee Ik-hwan (born 17 January 1946) is a South Korean speed skater. He competed in two events at the 1968 Winter Olympics.
