= Anatoly Mashkov =

Soviet speed skater

Personal information
- Nationality: Soviet
- Born: 30 August 1944 (age 81)

Sport
- Sport: Speed skating

Anatoly Mashkov (born 30 August 1944) is a Soviet speed skater. He competed in two events at the 1968 Winter Olympics.
