= Carry Geijssen =

Dutch speed skater (born 1947)

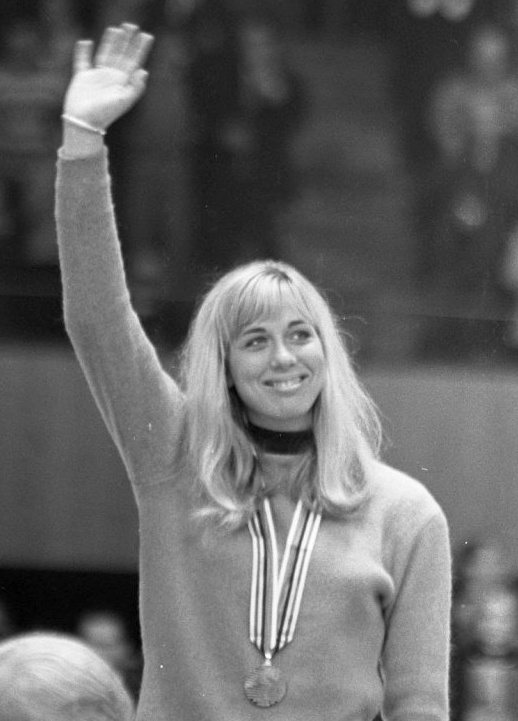
- Geijssen at the 1968 Olympics

Personal information
- Born: January 11, 1947 (age 79) Amsterdam, the Netherlands
- Height: 1.76 m (5 ft 9 in)
- Weight: 72 kg (159 lb)

Sport
- Country: Netherlands
- Sport: Speed skating
Medal record
Women's speed skating
Representing the Netherlands
Olympic Games
Gold medal – first place	1968 Grenoble	1000 m
Silver medal – second place	1968 Grenoble	1500 m
World Championships
Bronze medal – third place	1968 Helsinki	Allround

Carolina ("Carry") Cornelia Catharina Geijssen (born 11 January 1947) is a former speed skater from the Netherlands.

Carry Geijssen won silver at the Dutch Allround Championships in 1965 (a feat she would repeat in 1967 and 1968). In 1966, she became Dutch Allround Champion. At the 1968 World Allround Championships in Helsinki, she won bronze behind Stien Kaiser and Ans Schut, making the podium entirely Dutch.

Geijssen then participated in the 1968 Winter Olympics in Grenoble, where she became Olympic Champion on the 1,000 m in a new Olympic record time. This made her the first Dutch Olympic Champion in speed skating in Olympic history. The next day, Ans Schut (on the 3,000 m) would become the second, while Kees Verkerk (on the 1,500 m) would become the third Dutch Olympic Champion in speed skating four days after that. Geijssen went on to win Olympic silver on the 1,500 m, just 0.3 seconds behind winner Kaija Mustonen.

After that, Geijssen remained active for several more years, but did not have any more major results. She ended her speed skating career in 1971. She married the cyclist Rien Langkruis, and later lived in Indonesia and Canada.

She is the younger sister of speed skater Bep Geijssen.

== Medals ==
An overview of medals won by Carry Geijssen at important championships she participated in, listing the years in which she won each:

Championships	Gold medal	Silver medal	Bronze medal
Winter Olympics	1968 (1,000 m)	1968 (1,500 m)	
World Allround			1968
Dutch Allround	1966	1965; 1967; 1968	

== Records ==
Over the course of her career, Geijssen skated two Dutch Senior records in women's speed skating and a total of 19 Junior records (one doubling as both Senior and Junior record):

Dutch records
Distance	Result	Date	Location
500 m J	55.9	09-02-1963	Amsterdam
1,000 m J	2:01.8	09-02-1963	Amsterdam
500m J	51.3	06-11-1963	Deventer
500 m JS	49.8	24-01-1964	Amsterdam
1,500 m J	2:43.1	24-01-1964	Amsterdam
1,000 m J	1:45.0	25-01-1964	Amsterdam
3,000 m J	5:48.0	25-01-1964	Amsterdam
Mini combination J	214.667	24/25-01-1964	Amsterdam
1,000 m J	1:43.2	27-01-1964	Amsterdam
1,000 m J	1:41.6	08-03-1964	Deventer
500 m J	49.7	02-01-1965	Amsterdam
1,500 m J	2:35.9	02-01-1965	Amsterdam
1,000 m J	1:39.0	03-01-1965	Amsterdam
3,000 m J	5:37.4	03-01-1965	Amsterdam
Mini combination J	207.400	02/03-01-1965	Amsterdam
500 m J	48.9	19-02-1965	Deventer
1500 m J	2:35.3	19-02-1965	Deventer
1,000 m J	1:38.7	13-03-1965	Amsterdam
3,000 m J	5:32.8	27-12-1965	Deventer
500 m J	48.8	03-01-1966	Amsterdam
500 m S	48.5	15-12-1966	Deventer

Personal records
Distance	Result	Date	Location
500 m	45.9	09-02-1970	Davos
1,000 m	1:31.5	01-03-1969	Inzell
1,500 m	2:21.3	20-01-1968	Davos
3,000 m	5:00.8	21-01-1968	Davos
Sprint combination	190.160	21/22-02-1970	West Allis
Mini combination	190.483	20/21-01-1968	Davos

Best results on Dutch ice
Distance	Result	Date	Location
500 m	48.1	14-11-1967	Heerenveen
1,000 m	1:35.7	11-01-1971	Amsterdam
1,500 m	2:26.7	18-02-1967	Deventer
3,000 m	5:13.2	11-01-1970	Deventer
Mini combination	199.457	10/11-01-1971	Amsterdam

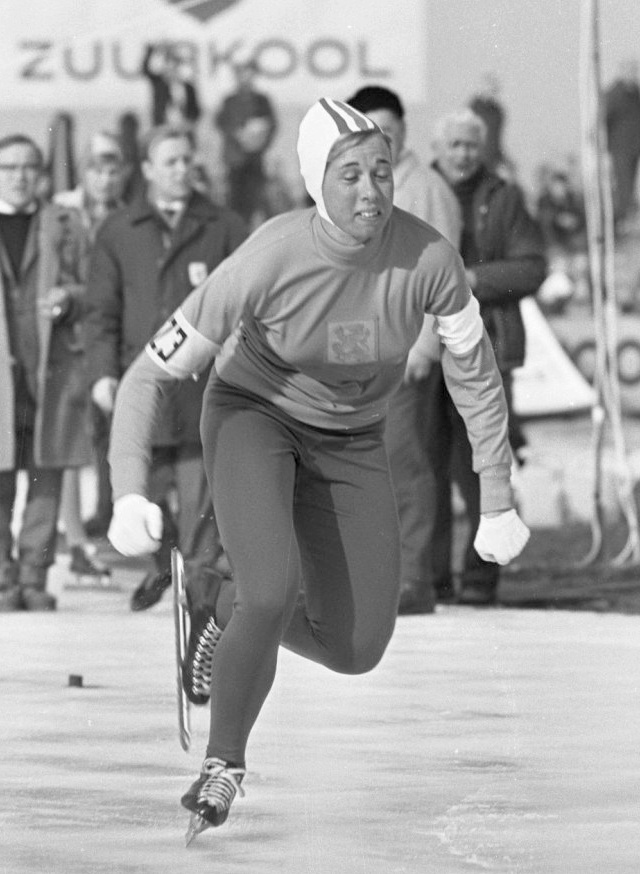
Geijssen in 1967
