= Stanislav Selyanin =

Soviet speed skater

Personal information
- Nationality: Soviet
- Born: 12 August 1936 (age 88); Yakutsk, Russian SFSR, Soviet Union

Sport
- Sport: Speed skating

Stanislav Selyanin (born 12 August 1936) is a Soviet speed skater. He competed in two events at the 1968 Winter Olympics.
