= Paul Enock =

Canadian speed skater (1934–2013)

Personal information
- Nationality: Canadian
- Born: 9 July 1934 Sydney, Australia
- Died: 24 February 2013 (aged 78) Langley, British Columbia, Canada

Sport
- Sport: Speed skating

Paul Alan Enock (9 July 1934 – 24 February 2013) was a Canadian speed skater. He competed in two events at the 1968 Winter Olympics.
