= Raimo Hietala =

Finnish speed skater

Personal information
- Nationality: Finnish
- Born: 9 April 1946 (age 78); Rovaniemi, Finland

Sport
- Sport: Speed skating

Raimo Hietala (born 9 April 1946) is a Finnish speed skater. He competed in three events at the 1968 Winter Olympics.
