= Yoshiaki Demachi =

Japanese speed skater (1943–1978)

Personal information
- Nationality: Japanese
- Born: 18 August 1943; Aomori, Japan
- Died: 19 January 1978 (aged 34)

Sport
- Sport: Speed skating

Yoshiaki Demachi (出町 嘉明, Demachi Yoshiaki, 18 August 1943 – 19 January 1978) was a Japanese speed skater. He competed in two events at the 1968 Winter Olympics.
