= Speed skating at the 1968 Winter Olympics =

Speed skating at the X Olympic Winter Games
- Pictogram for speed skating
- Venue: L'Anneau de Vitesse
- Date: 4–12 February 1968
- No. of events: 8
- Competitors: 129 from 19 nations

Speed skating at the 1968 Winter Olympics, was held from 4 to 12 February. Eight events were contested at L'Anneau de Vitesse in Grenoble, France.

== Medal summary ==
=== Medal table ===
Rank	Nation	Gold	Silver	Bronze	Total
1	Netherlands	3	3	3	9
2	Norway	1	3	0	4
3	Finland	1	1	0	2
3	Soviet Union	1	1	0	2
5	Sweden	1	0	1	2
6	West Germany	1	0	0	1
7	United States	0	4	1	5
Totals (7 entries)		8	12	5	25

The Netherlands topped the medal table, with nine medals, three of each type. Three tied events meant that only five bronze medals were awarded. The gold medal won by Erhard Keller was the first medal in speedskating for West Germany as a separate country.

Five athletes shared the top of the individual medal table, with one gold and one silver each: Kees Verkerk and Carry Geijssen of the Netherlands, Finland's Kaija Mustonen, the Soviet Union's Lyudmila Titova and Norway's Fred Anton Maier.

Three American female skaters were tied for a silver in the women's 500 meters, all showing the same time.

=== Men's events ===
Event	Gold		Silver		Bronze	
500 metres	Bill Cox; West Germany	40.3	Terry McDermott; United States; Magne Thomassen; Norway	40.5	None awarded	
1500 metres	Kees Verkerk; Netherlands	2:03.4 (OR)	Ivar Eriksen; Norway; Ard Schenk; Netherlands	2:05.0	None awarded	
5000 metres	Fred Anton Maier; Norway	7:22.4 (WR)	Kees Verkerk; Netherlands	7:23.2	Peter Nottet; Netherlands	7:25.5
10,000 metres	Johnny Höglin; Sweden	15:23.6 (OR)	Fred Anton Maier; Norway	15:23.9	Örjan Sandler; Sweden	15:31.8

=== Women's events ===
Event	Gold		Silver		Bronze	
500 metres	Lyudmila Titova; Soviet Union	46.1	Jenny Fish; United States; Dianne Holum; United States; Mary Meyers; United States	46.3	None awarded	
1000 metres	Carry Geijssen; Netherlands	1:32.6 (OR)	Lyudmila Titova; Soviet Union	1:32.9	Dianne Holum; United States	1:33.4
1500 metres	Kaija Mustonen; Finland	2:22.4 (OR)	Carry Geijssen; Netherlands	2:22.7	Stien Kaiser; Netherlands	2:24.5
3000 metres	Ans Schut; Netherlands	4:56.2 (OR)	Kaija Mustonen; Finland	5:01.0	Stien Kaiser; Netherlands	5:01.3

== Records ==
One world record and six Olympic records were set at Grenoble. The only Olympic records not broken were in the two shortest events, the men's and women's 500 metres.

Event	Date	Team	Time	OR	WR
Men's 1500 metres	16 February	Kees Verkerk (NED)	2:03.4	OR	
Men's 5000 metres	15 February	Fred Anton Maier (NOR)	7:22.4	OR	WR
Men's 10,000 metres	17 February	Johnny Höglin (SWE)	15:23.6	OR	
Women's 1000 metres	11 February	Carry Geijssen (NED)	1:32.6	OR	
Women's 1500 metres	10 February	Kaija Mustonen (FIN)	2:22.4	OR	
Women's 3000 metres	12 February	Ans Schut (NED)	4:56.2	OR	

== Participating NOCs ==
Nineteen nations competed in the speed skating events at Grenoble. East and West Germany made their debuts as separate teams.

- Australia (1)
- Austria (3)
- Canada (7)
- Finland (8)
- France (5)
- East Germany (1)
- West Germany (8)
- Great Britain (5)
- Hungary (3)
- Italy (4)
- Japan (12)
- South Korea (2)
- Mongolia (3)
- Netherlands (9)
- Norway (13)
- Soviet Union (16)
- Sweden (11)
- Switzerland (3)
- United States (15)
