= Christina Karlsson =

Swedish speed skater

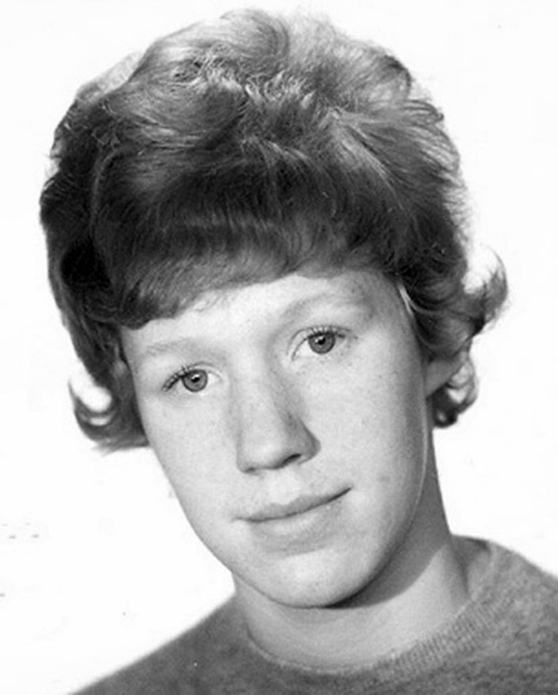

Personal information
- Born: 3 June 1946 (age 80) Hällefors, Sweden
- Height: 169 cm (5 ft 7 in)
- Weight: 59 kg (130 lb)

Sport
- Sport: Speed skating
- Club: Mälarhöjdens IK, Stockholm

Achievements and titles
- Personal bests: 500 m – 47.9 (1968); 1000 m – 1:38.3 (1963); 1500 m – 2:30.7 (1963); 3000 m – 5:11.6 (1968)

Irma Christina Karlsson (later Wuopio, born 3 June 1946) is a retired Swedish speed skater. She competed in the 1500 and 3000 m events at the 1968 Winter Olympics and finished in 18th and 13th place, respectively.
