= Bill Cox (speed skater) =

American speed skater

Personal information
- Born: July 4, 1947 (age 79) Saint Paul, Minnesota, United States

Sport
- Sport: Speed skating

Bill Cox (born July 4, 1947) is an American speed skater. He competed in two events at the 1968 Winter Olympics.
