= Johnny Höglin =

Swedish speed skater

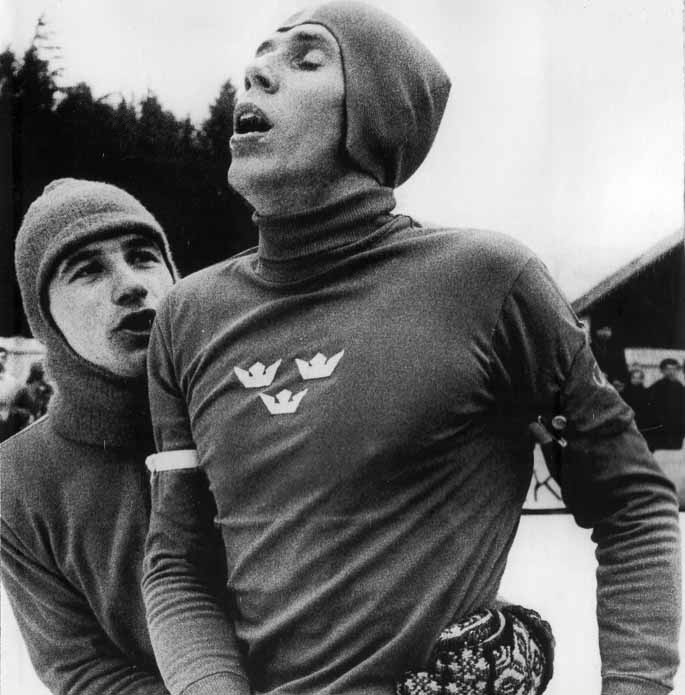
- Kees Verkerk and Johnny Höglin (right) at the 1968 Winter Olympics in Grenoble, France

Personal information
- Born: 26 February 1943 (age 83) Nykroppa, Sweden
- Height: 1.84 m (6 ft 0 in)
- Weight: 78 kg (172 lb)

Sport
- Sport: Speed skating
- Club: Karlstad SK

Achievements and titles
- Personal best(s): 500 m – 40.3 (1970) 1000 m – 1:21.3 (1970); 1500 m – 2:02.1 (1972); 5000 m – 7:26.0 (1972) 10000 m – 15:23.6 (1968)
Medal record
Representing Sweden
Olympic Games
Gold medal – first place	1968 Grenoble	10000 m

Hans Johnny Höglin (born 26 February 1943) is a Swedish speed skater whose greatest moment was to win a gold medal in the 10000-meter event at the 1968 Winter Olympics in Grenoble, France.

Höglin was a surprise winner, having never placed higher than 10th in the European or World Championships, and having finished fifth in the 1500 and 5000-meter races at the 1968 Olympics. He nevertheless edged favorite Fred Anton Maier by 0.3 seconds to win the 10000 meters.

At the 1972 Winter Olympics, Höglin finished 9th in the 1500 meters and 12th in the 5000 meters.

Höglin's younger brother Urban, along with Urban's fiancée Heidi Paakkonen, was murdered while touring New Zealand in 1989. (Note: Unable to find a reputable news source that states this. Also, the article page about the murder does not mention this relationship.)
