= Stien Kaiser =

Dutch speed skater (1938–2022)

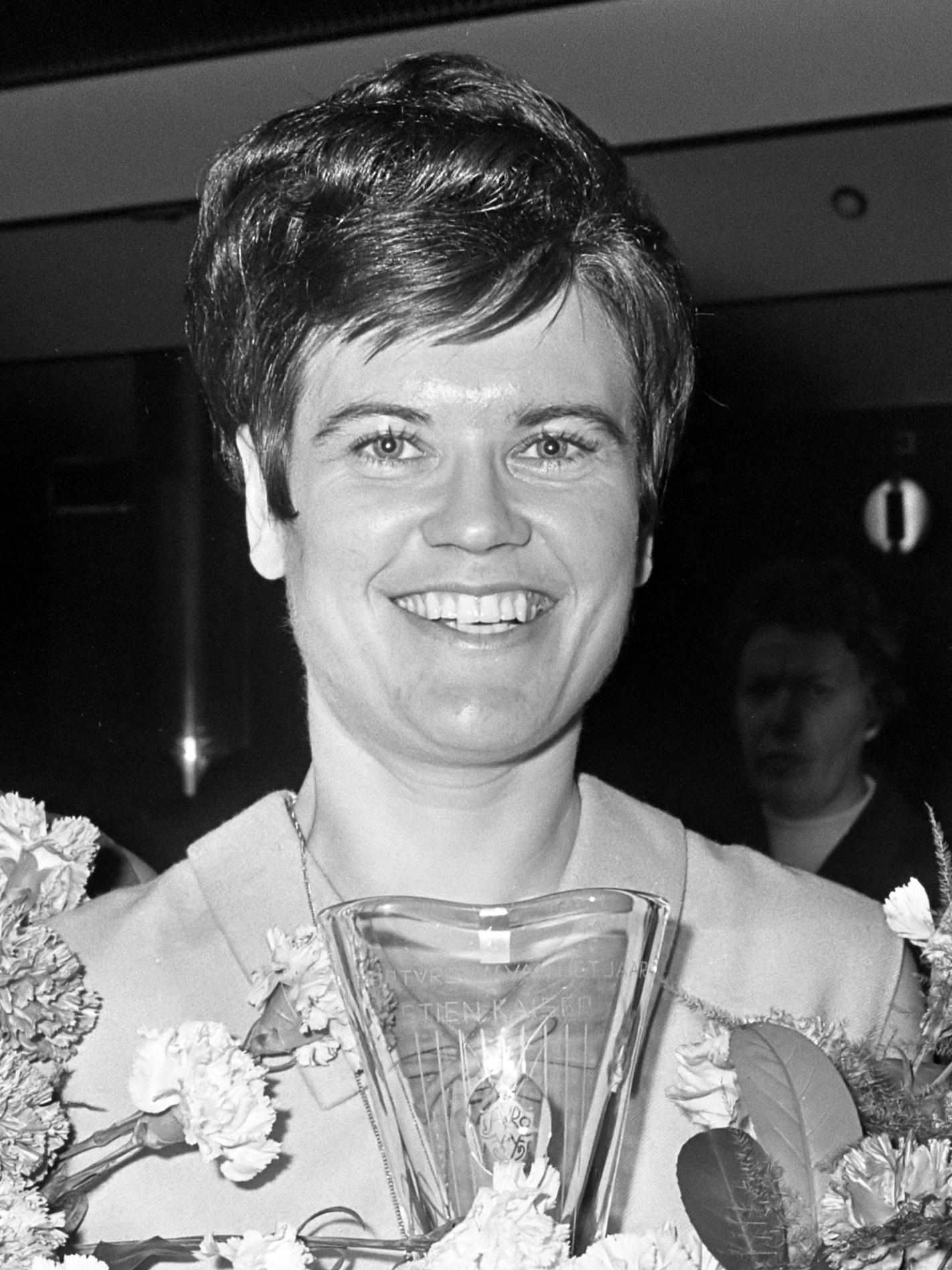
- Kaiser in 1968

Personal information
- Born: 20 May 1938 Delft, Netherlands
- Died: 23 June 2022 (aged 84)

Sport
- Country: Netherlands
- Sport: Speed skating
Medal record
Women's speed skating
Representing the Netherlands
Olympic Games
Gold medal – first place	1972 Sapporo	3000 m
Silver medal – second place	1972 Sapporo	1500 m
Bronze medal – third place	1968 Grenoble	1500 m
Bronze medal – third place	1968 Grenoble	3000 m
World Championships
Gold medal – first place	1967 Deventer	Allround
Gold medal – first place	1968 Helsinki	Allround
Silver medal – second place	1969 Grenoble	Allround
Silver medal – second place	1970 West-Allis	Allround
Silver medal – second place	1971 Helsinki	Allround
Silver medal – second place	1972 Heerenveen	Allround
Bronze medal – third place	1965 Oulu	Allround
Bronze medal – third place	1966 Trondheim	Allround
European Championships
Silver medal – second place	1970 Heerenveen	Allround

Christina ("Stien") Wilhelmina Baas-Kaiser (20 May 1938 – 23 June 2022) was a Dutch speed skater.

== Life ==
She was not selected for the 1964 Winter Olympics because of her 'old age' (25 at that time) but later turned out to be the first Dutch female world class speed skater. In both 1965 and 1966, she won bronze at the World Allround Championships. After having become World Allround Champion twice (in 1967 and 1968) – and also winning her 3rd and 4th Dutch Allround Championships those years – she participated at the 1968 Winter Olympics in Grenoble. Her two bronze medals – in the 1,500 m, behind Finnish skater Kaija Mustonen and Dutch compatriot Carry Geijssen, and in the 3,000 m behind compatriot Ans Schut and, once more, Kaija Mustonen – were a bit disappointing. Not she, but Geijssen (who not only won silver in the 1,500 m, but also gold in the 1,000 m) and Schut became the Dutch heroines of those Olympics.

Although she was still a formidable competitor in the years that followed, Kaiser was slightly surpassed at major championships by Atje Keulen-Deelstra, who was the same age as Kaiser. In 1972, by then married and 33 years old, Baas-Kaiser was no longer really considered to be a favourite, especially not after her disappointing 11th place at the European Allround Championships. At the 1972 Winter Olympics in Sapporo, Baas-Kaiser originally was not meant to skate, but since fellow Dutch skater Trijnie Rep had disappointed in the 500 m (finishing 20th) and the 1,000 m (finishing 24th), Baas-Kaiser was given a chance in the 1,500 m and the 3,000 m. And she turned it into something beautiful: On the 1,500 m, she won silver behind Dianne Holum, but ahead of Atje Keulen-Deelstra, and in the 3,000 m two days later, she became Olympic Champion ahead of Holum and Keulen-Deelstra. She ended her skating career later that year with a silver medal at the World Allround Championships.

Nationally, she won the allround titles in 1964, 1965, 1967–1969, and 1971, finished second in 1970 and 1972, and third in 1966. In 1967, she was chosen the Dutch Sportswoman of the Year. She was a niece of the Olympic speed skater Kees Broekman.

== Records ==
Over the course of her career, Baas-Kaiser skated nine world records and twenty-seven Dutch records:

World records
Distance	Result	Date	Location
3,000 m	5:04.8	29 January 1967	Davos
3,000 m	4:56.8	5 March 1967	Inzell
Mini combination	188.634	5 March 1967	Inzell
3,000 m	4:54.6	3 February 1968	Davos
1,000 m	1:31.0	3 March 1968	Inzell
1,500 m	2:15.8	15 January 1971	Davos
3,000 m	4:46.5	16 January 1971	Davos
1,000 m	1:29.0	16 January 1971	Davos
Mini combination	182.817	16 January 1971	Davos

Dutch records
Distance	Result	Date	Location
3,000 m	5:36.4	25 January 1964	Amsterdam
Mini combination	213.317	25 January 1964	Amsterdam
500 m	48.8	7 March 1964	Deventer
1000 m	1:37.3	8 March 1964	Deventer
3,000 m	5:29.9	8 March 1964	Deventer
Mini combination	205.366	8 March 1964	Deventer
1500 m	2:30.8	2 January 1965	Amsterdam
3,000 m	5:23.1	3 January 1965	Amsterdam
Mini combination	203.267	3 January 1965	Amsterdam
500 m	48.1	7 January 1967	Amsterdam
1500 m	2:30.4	7 January 1967	Amsterdam
1000 m	1:35.8	8 January 1967	Amsterdam
3000 m	5:16.5	8 January 1967	Amsterdam
Mini combination	198.883	8 January 1967	Amsterdam
500 m	46.5	18 February 1967	Deventer
1500 m	2:23.0	18 February 1967	Deventer
Mini combination	195.384	19 February 1967	Deventer
3,000 m	5:14.6	17 December 1967	Heerenveen
3,000 m	5:02.5	12 January 1969	Heerenveen
Mini combination	194.100	12 January 1969	Heerenveen
1500 m	2:21.5	1 February 1969	Grenoble
Mini combination	190.483	2 February 1969	Grenoble
1500 m	2:15.8	15 January 1971	Davos
1000 m	1:29.0	16 January 1971	Davos
3,000 m	4:46.5	16 January 1971	Davos
Mini combination	182.817	16 January 1971	Davos
Sprint combination	180.220	21 February 1971	Inzell

Note that Dutch records until the 1968 season only could be skated in the Netherlands

Personal records
Distance	Result	Date	Location
500 m	44.81	4 March 1972	Heerenveen
1,000 m	1:29.0	16 January 1971	Davos
1,500 m	2:15.8	15 January 1971	Davos
3,000 m	4:46.5	16 January 1971	Davos
Mini combination	182.817	16 January 1971	Davos

Awards
Preceded by Ada Kok	Dutch Sportswoman of the Year; 1967	Succeeded by Ada Kok
Olympic Games
Preceded by Ard Schenk	Flagbearer for Netherlands; Grenoble 1968	Succeeded by Atje Keulen-Deelstra
