= Örjan Sandler =

Swedish speed skater

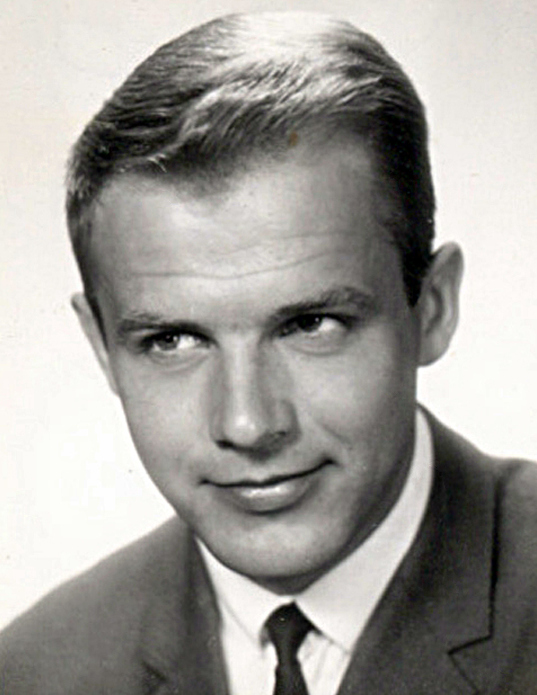

Personal information
- Born: 28 September 1940 (age 85) Sunne, Sweden
- Height: 1.80 m (5 ft 11 in)
- Weight: 74 kg (163 lb)

Sport
- Sport: Speed skating
- Club: IF Castor, Östersund (1964); IFK Strömsund (1968–70)

Achievements and titles
- Personal best(s): 500 m – 41.2 (1969); 1000 m – 1:21.9 (1969); 1500 m – 2:04.2 (1968); 5000 m – 7:22.5 (1969); 10000 m – 15:09.00 (1980)
Medal record
Representing Sweden
Winter Olympics
Bronze medal – third place	1968 Grenoble	10000 m

Örjan Sandler (born 28 September 1940) is a former Swedish speed skater who competed in five Winter Olympics between 1964 and 1980.

== Olympic results ==
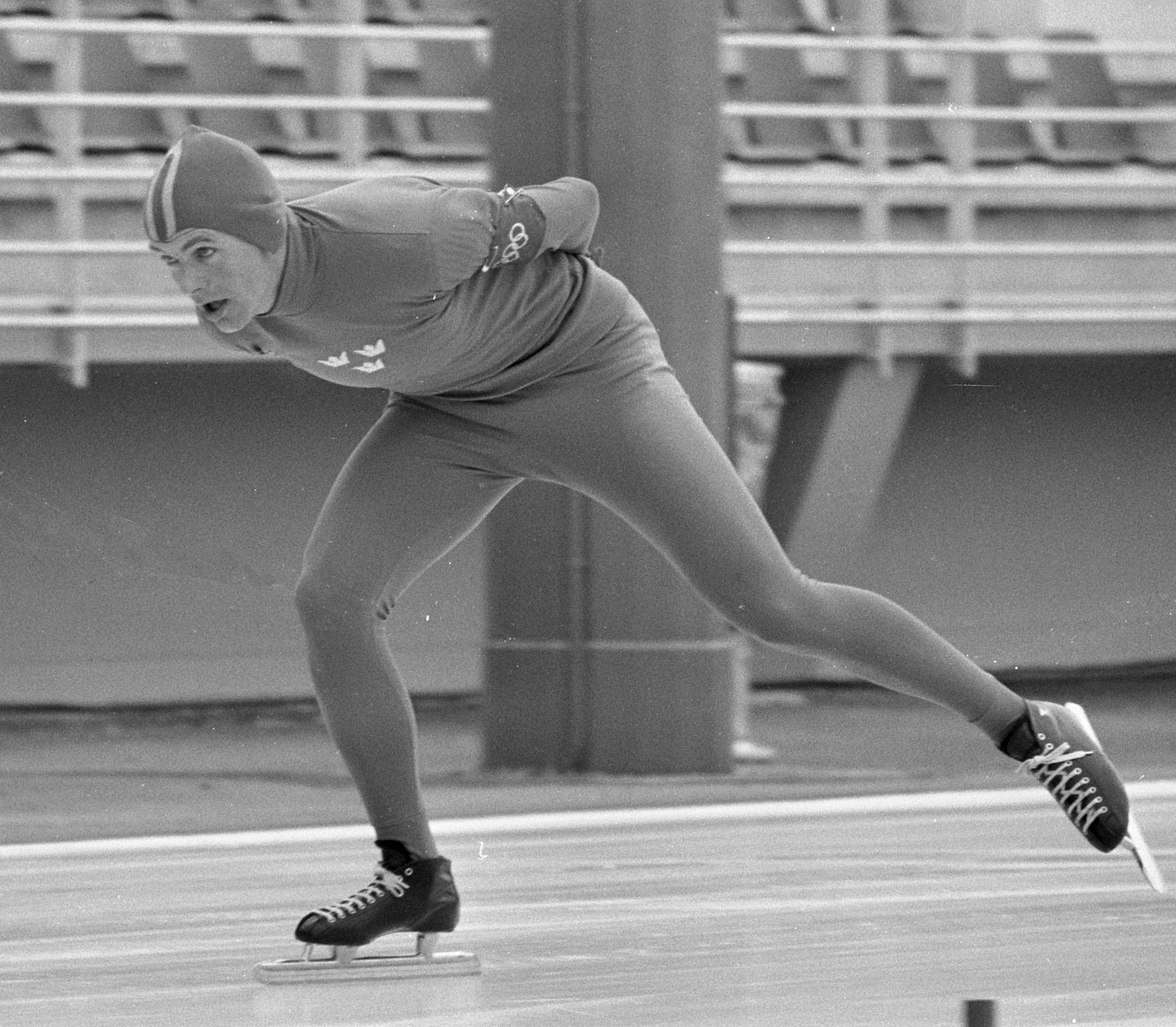
Sandler at the 1968 Olympics

In 1964 he finished 17th in the 10000 m, 18th in the 1500 me, and 19th in the 5000 m contest. Four years later he won the bronze medal in the 10000 m event. He finished sixth in the 5000 m and tenth in the 1500 m contest.

At the 1972 Games he finished 14th in the 5000 m and 15th in the 10000 m competition. In 1976 he finished fifth in the 10000 m and eighth in the 5000 m event.

His final Olympic appearance was in 1980 when he finished 14th in the 10000 m competition.

== Other activities ==
Sandler was an athlete who competed in long-distance running, cycling, orienteering, triathlon, cross-country and Nordic skiing. He was particularly successful in triathlon, winning multiple international competitions in various age groups such as the World Championships in 2001.
