= Fred Anton Maier =

Norwegian speed skater and cyclist

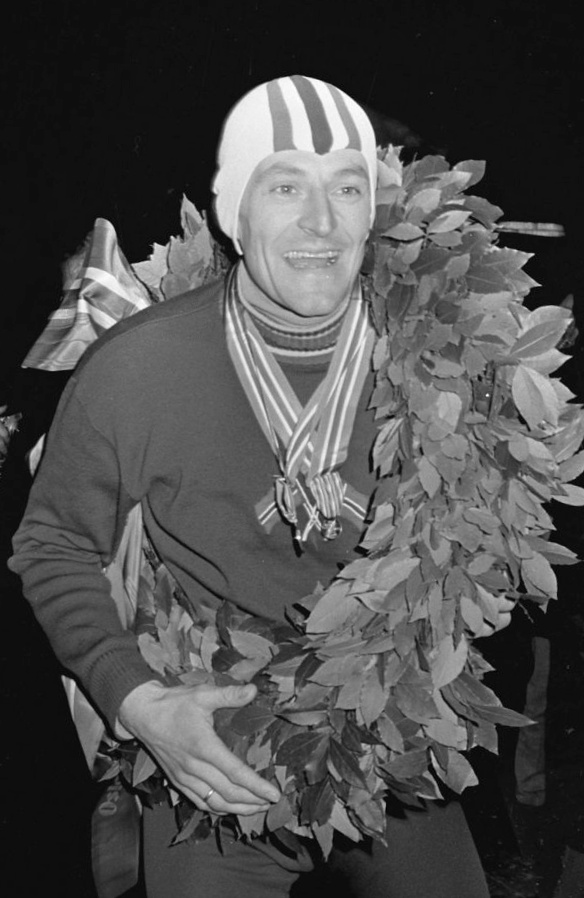
- Maier, January 1968

Personal information
- Born: 15 December 1938 Nøtterøy, Norway
- Died: 9 June 2015 (aged 76) Nøtterøy, Norway

Sport
- Country: Norway
- Sport: Men's speed skating
- Club: Tønsbergs TF

Achievements and titles
- Personal bests: 500 m: 41.8 (1968); 1000 m: 1:24.3 (1968); 1500 m: 2:06.1 (1968); 3000 m: 4:17.5 (1968); 5000 m: 7:16.7 (1968); 10 000 m: 15:20.3 (1968)
Medal record
Men's speed skating
Representing Norway
Olympic Games
Gold medal – first place	1968 Grenoble	5,000 m
Silver medal – second place	1964 Innsbruck	10,000 m
Silver medal – second place	1968 Grenoble	10,000 m
Bronze medal – third place	1964 Innsbruck	5,000 m

Fred Anton Maier (15 December 1938 – 9 June 2015) was a speed skater from Norway. He was among the dominating skaters throughout the 1960s, specialising in the longer distances.

Maier won four Olympic medals: silver on the 10,000 m and bronze on the 5,000 m at the 1964 Olympics, and gold on the 5,000 m and silver on the 10,000 m at the 1968 Olympics. In 1968, he also became European and World Allround Champion. In total, Maier set eleven world records. For a brief week in 1968 he held four world records simultaneously, the 3,000 m, 5,000 m, 10,000 m, and the allround samalogue record.

In addition, Maier excelled in cycling, winning two National Time Trial Championships bronze medals (in 1957 and 1967). In 1967, he was awarded the Egebergs Ærespris and in 1968, he won the Oscar Mathisen Award and was chosen Norwegian Sportsperson of the Year.

Maier died from cancer on 9 June 2015 at the age of 76. The Tønsberg Stadion was renamed in 2015, to take his name and a statue of Maier was erected at the stadium's south entrance.

== Medals ==
An overview of medals won by Maier at important championships he participated in, listing the years in which he won each:

Championships	Gold medal	Silver medal	Bronze medal
Winter Olympics	1968 (5,000 m)	1964 (10,000 m); 1968 (10,000 m)	1964 (5,000 m)
World Allround	1968	–	–
European Allround	1968	–	–
Norwegian Allround	1965	1966; 1967; 1968	1961

== Records ==
=== World records ===
Over the course of his career, Maier skated eleven world records:

Discipline	Time	Date	Location	Notes
5000 m	7.28,1	4 March 1965	Notodden	Beaten by Kees Verkerk on 26 February 1967
10,000 m	15.32,2	6 February 1966	Oslo	Beaten by Maier himself (see below)
Big combination	178.253	6 February 1966	Oslo	Beaten by Kees Verkerk on 12 February 1967
10,000 m	15.31,8	28 February 1967	Inzell	Beaten by Maier himself (see below)
5000 m	7.26,2	7 January 1968	Deventer	Beaten by Maier himself (see below)
10,000 m	15.29,5	21 January 1968	Horten	Beaten by Maier himself (see below)
10,000 m	15.20,3	28 January 1968	Oslo	Beaten by Per Willy Guttormsen on 10 March 1968
5000 m	7.22,4	15 February 1968	Grenoble	Beaten by Maier himself (see below)
Big combination	176.340	25 February 1968	Gothenburg	Beaten by Kees Verkerk on 10 March 1968
3000 m	4.17,5	7 March 1968	Inzell	Beaten by Dag Fornæss on 28 January 1969
5000 m	7.16,7	9 March 1968	Inzell	Beaten by Kees Verkerk on 1 March 1969

Source: SpeedSkatingStats.com

=== Personal records ===
To put these personal records in perspective, the WR column lists the official world records on the dates that Maier skated his personal records.

Event	Result	Date	Venue	WR
500 m	41.8	3 February 1968	Davos	39.2
1,000 m	1:24.3	1 December 1968	Inzell	1:20.5
1,500 m	2:06.1	10 March 1968	Inzell	2:02.5
3,000 m	4:17.5	7 March 1968	Inzell	4:18.4
5,000 m	7:16.7	9 March 1968	Inzell	7:22.4
10,000 m	15:20.3	28 January 1968	Bislett	15:29.5

Maier has an Adelskalender score of 173.518 points. His highest ranking on the Adelskalender was a second place.

== Biography ==
- Maier forteller til Knut Bjørnsen (Aschehoug, Oslo, 1968) (in Norwegian)

Awards
Preceded by (Norway) Ole Ellefsæter	Egebergs Ærespris; 1967	Succeeded by (Norway) Frithjof Prydz
Preceded by (Netherlands) Kees Verkerk	Oscar Mathisen Award; 1968	Succeeded by (Norway) Dag Fornæss
Preceded by (Norway) Bjørn Wirkola	Norwegian Sportsperson of the Year; 1968	Succeeded by (Norway) Dag Fornæss
