= Jaap Edenbaan =

Sports park

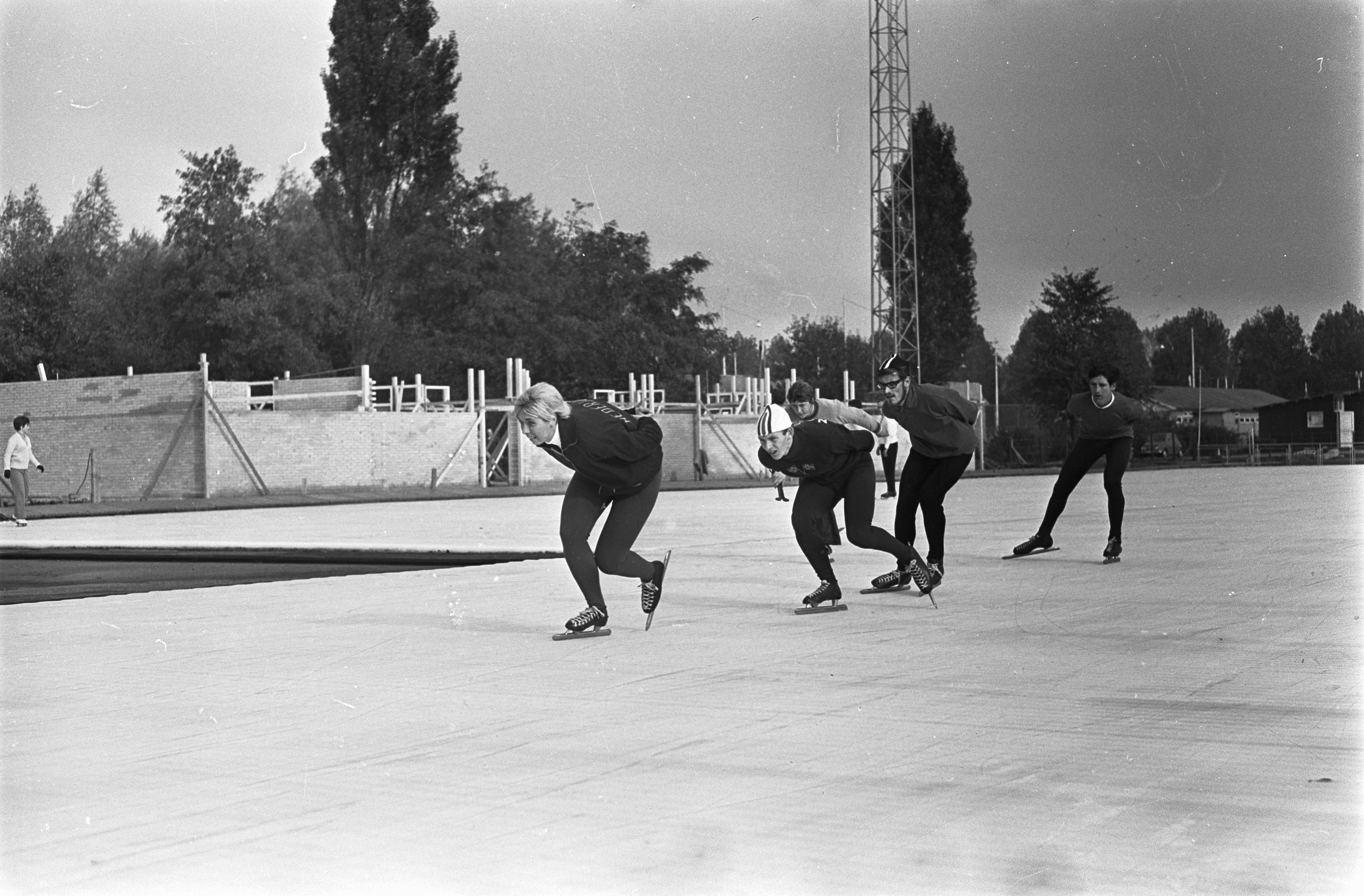

- Location within Netherlands
- Location: Amsterdam, Netherlands
- Coordinates: 52°20′55″N 4°56′40″E
- Type: Ice rink

Construction
- Opened: December 1961

Website
- Official website

The Jaap Edenbaan (translated: Jaap Eden track) is an ice rink located in the Watergraafsmeer, a neighborhood of eastern Amsterdam. The rink is named after the famous Dutch ice skater Jaap Eden.

It contains a 400-meter lane and Jaap Edenhal. The hall is the home of the Amsterdam Tigers of the BeNe League. There is also a rink for children and beginners beside the course proper, and a climbing wall.

When the Jaap Eden baan opened in December 1961, it was the first artificial 400-meter ice rink in the Netherlands and the third in the world. The ice is created by spraying water on concrete that rests on a framework of some 269 tubes filled with evaporating ammonia. Built on an existing athletic track, it was originally intended to be dismantled every summer, but the process required so much work that it was only done once.
