= Ans Schut =

Dutch speed skater (1944–2025)

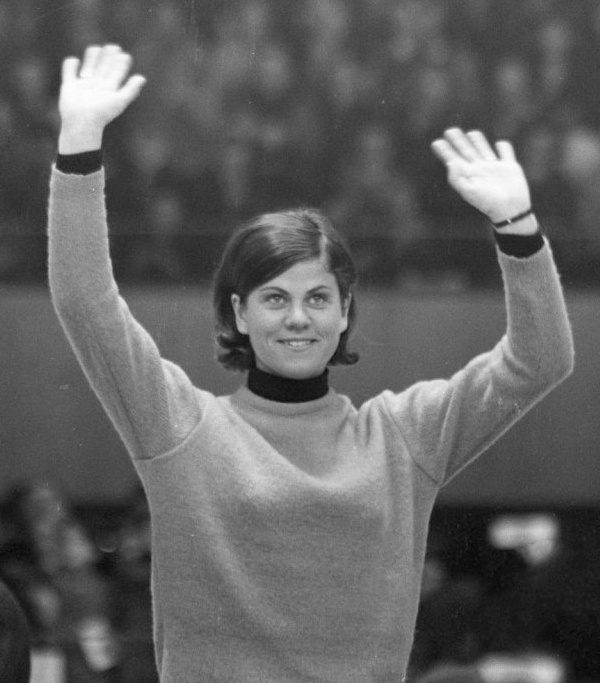
- Schut in 1968

Personal information
- Born: 26 November 1944 Apeldoorn, Netherlands
- Died: 7 November 2025 (aged 80)
- Height: 1.70 m (5 ft 7 in)
- Weight: 67 kg (148 lb)

Sport
- Country: Netherlands
- Sport: Speed skating
- Retired: 1971
Medal record
Women's speed skating
Representing the Netherlands
Olympic Games
Gold medal – first place	1968 Grenoble	3000 m
World Championships
Silver medal – second place	1968 Helsinki	Allround
Bronze medal – third place	1969 Grenoble	Allround
European Championships
Bronze medal – third place	1970 Heerenveen	Allround

Johanna "Ans" Schut (26 November 1944 – 7 November 2025) was a Dutch ice speed skater. She had her best year in 1968 when, after winning silver at the World Allround Championships, she became Olympic Champion on the 3,000 m at the 1968 Winter Olympics in Grenoble. Her time of 4:56.2 set a new Olympic record, beating Finnish skater Kaija Mustonen and Dutch compatriot Stien Kaiser, the 3,000 m world record holder at the time.

In 1969, Schut won silver at the European Allround Championships and bronze at the World Allround Championships. That year, she also skated five world records. The next two years, she fell a few times during international championships (although she did manage to win bronze at the World Allround Championships in 1970). In 1971, she ended her speed skating career, got married, and changed her last name to Boekema-Schut. She had three children.

Schut died on 7 November 2025, at the age of 80.

== Records ==
Over the course of her career, Schut skated 5 world records and 8 Dutch records:

World records, data from
Distance	Result	Date	Location
3,000 m	4:52.0	2 February 1969	Grenoble
3,000 m	4:50.4	9 February 1969	Davos
1,500 m	2:18.5	22 February 1969	Inzell
3,000 m	4:50.3	23 February 1969	Inzell
Mini combination	185.500	23 February 1969	Inzell

Dutch records, data from
Distance	Result	Date	Location
3,000 m	5:10.6	12 March 1968	Deventer
3,000 m	5:04.1	22 December 1968	Heerenveen
3,000 m	4:52.0	2 February 1969	Grenoble
3,000 m	4:50.4	9 February 1969	Davos
Mini combination	189.000	9 February 1969	Davos
1,500 m	2:18.5	22 February 1969	Inzell
3,000 m	4:50.3	23 February 1969	Inzell
Mini combination	185.500	23 February 1969	Inzell

Personal records
Distance	Result	Date	Location
500 m	44.9	24 January 1971	Davos
1,000 m	1:30.1	16 January 1971	Davos
1,500 m	2:16.6	2 March 1968	Davos
3,000 m	4:50.3	23 February 1969	Inzell
Mini combination	184.266	16 January 1971	Davos

== Honours ==
On 14 May 2021, Jovian asteroid 43436 Ansschut, discovered by astronomers with the American LINEAR survey in 2000, was named in her honour.
