= Peter Nottet =

Dutch speed skater

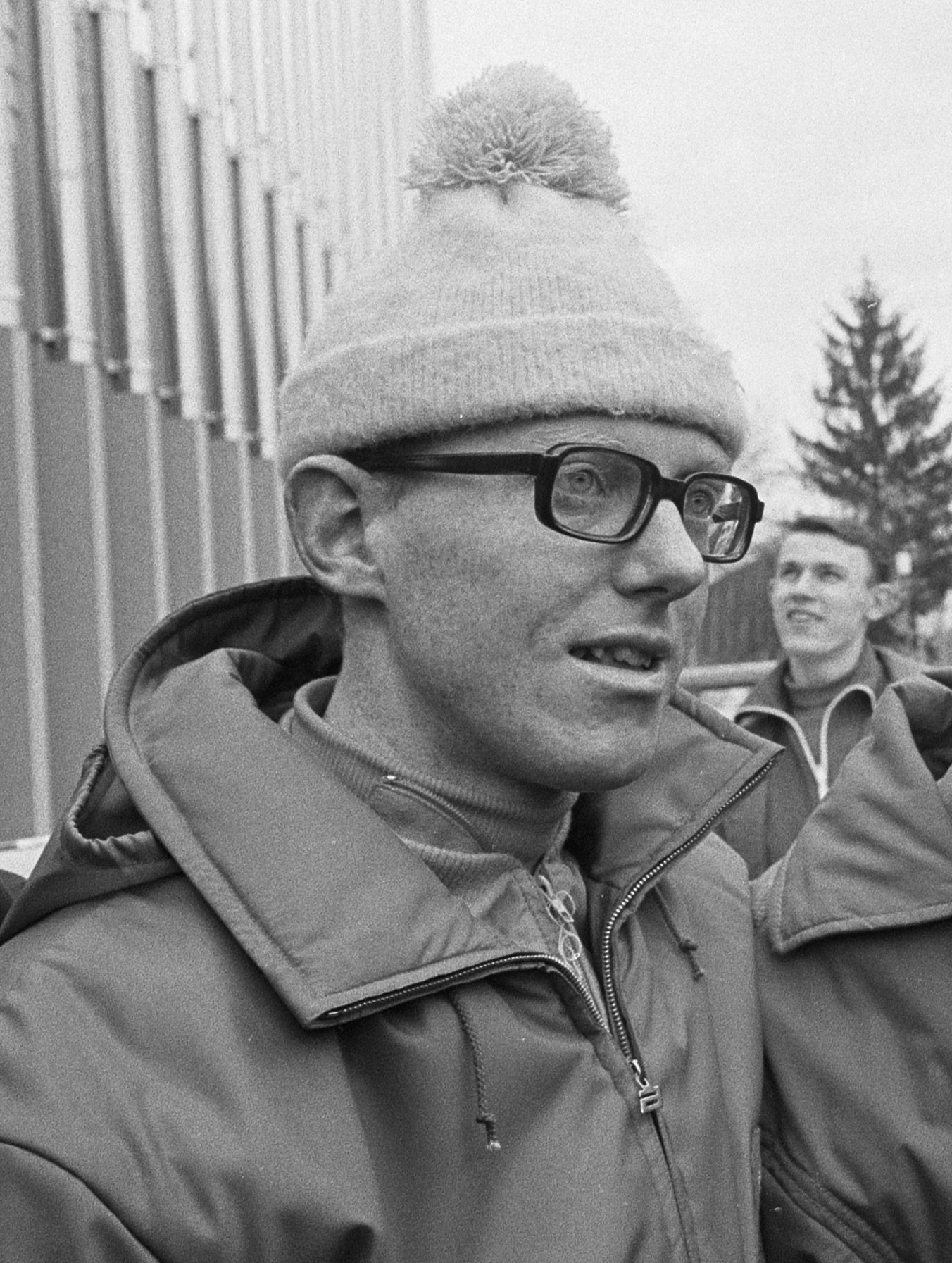
- Peter Nottet in 1968

Personal information
- Born: 23 September 1944 (age 81) The Hague, Netherlands
- Height: 1.81 m (5 ft 11 in)
- Weight: 72 kg (159 lb)

Sport
- Country: Netherlands
- Sport: Speed skating
- Club: Loosduinen

Achievements and titles
- Personal best(s): 1964 Winter Olympics; 1968 Winter Olympics
Medal record
Men's speed skating
Representing the Netherlands
Olympic Games
Bronze medal – third place	1968 Grenoble	5000 m

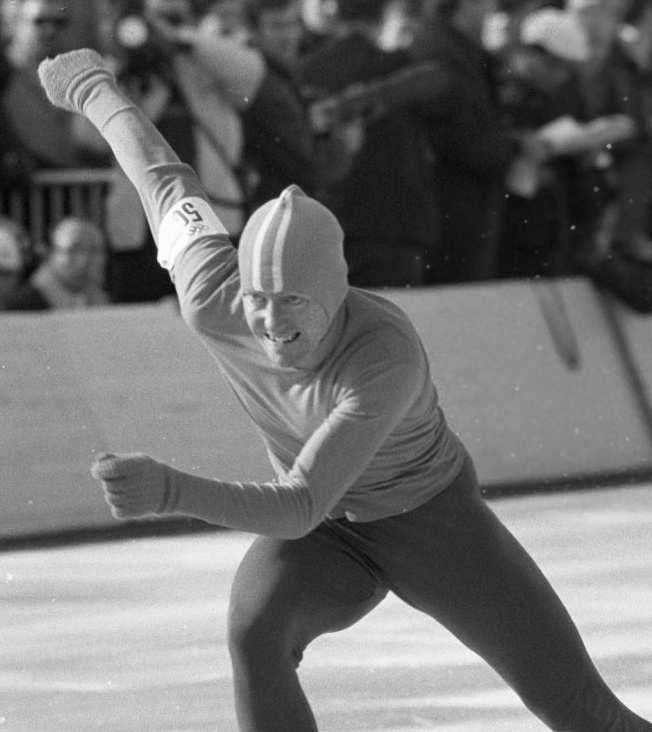
Peter Nottet in 1968

Petrus "Peter" Wilhelmus Frederikus Nottet (born 23 September 1944) is a Dutch speed skater who competed in the 1964 Winter Olympics and in the 1968 Winter Olympics. In 1964 he finished 34th in the 5000 metres event.

Four years later he won the bronze medal in the 5000 metres competition. In the 10000 metres contest he finished eighth, in the 1500 metres event he finished ninth, and in the 500 metres competition he finished 30th.

The 5000 m race in 1968 was his milestone. Nationally, his best achievement was second place all-round the same year. He competed in 6 world and 7 European championships but never won a medal, once finishing fourth at the 1969 world championships. He retired from competitions in 1973.

== Personal records ==
Personal records
Men's speed skating
Event	Result	Date	Location	Notes
500 m	40.1	6 February 1971	Davos	
1000 m	1:21.2	19 January 1971	Davos	
1500 m	2:02.2	7 February 1971	Davos	
3000 m	4:19.9	15 January 1971	Inzell	
5000 m	7:25.5	15 February 1968	Grenoble	
10000 m	15:24.8	7 February 1971	Davos	
