= L'Anneau de Vitesse =

Outdoor speed skating venue

Coordinates: 45°11′04″N 5°44′15″E

L'Anneau de Vitesse (English: The Speed Circuit) is an outdoor speed skating venue located in Grenoble, France. It hosted the speed skating events for the 1968 Winter Olympics. This Speed Circuit is located in a park of 27 hectares, the Park Paul Mistral. The park also hosts the Palais des sports was the main Olympic site in the city in 1968.

The venue seated 2500 during the games, and was cooled to −7 °C (19 °F) using 125 km (78 mi) of ammonia refrigeration over a total skating surface of 9,000 m^{2} (97,000 sq ft).

== Description ==
The speed ring was built outdoors, on a concrete slab cooled by over 125 km of tubing fed by a direct-pressure ammonia refrigeration plant. The grandstands are also made of concrete, and house the facilities required for the Olympic Games (offices, changing rooms, infirmary, bar and refrigeration facilities), as well as 2,500 seats.
