= Kaija Mustonen =

Finnish speed skater

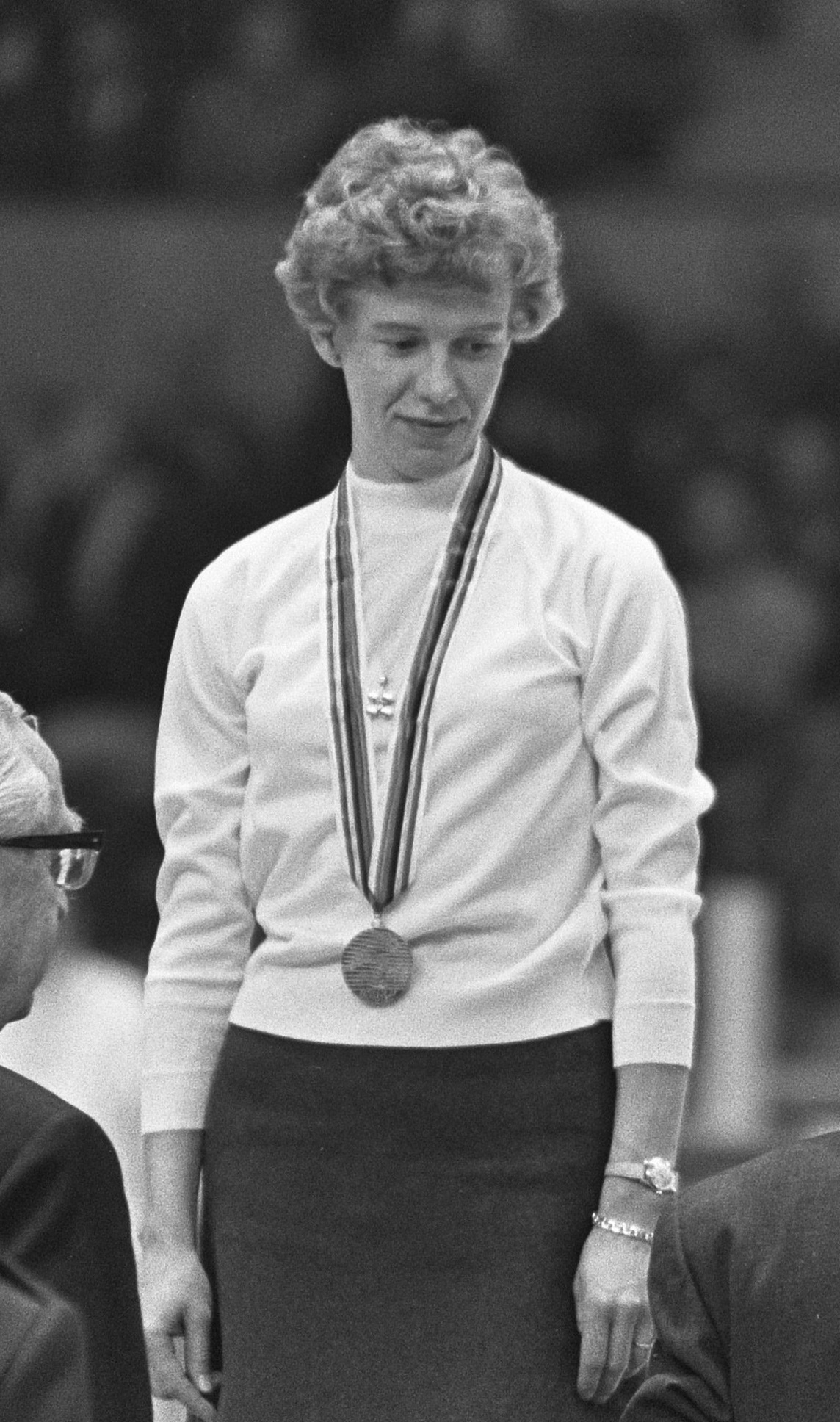
- Mustonen at the 1968 Olympics

Personal information
- Born: 4 August 1941 (age 84) Helsinki, Finland
- Height: 166 cm (5 ft 5 in)
- Weight: 52–54 kg (115–119 lb)

Sport
- Sport: Speed skating
- Club: Helsingin Luistinkiitäjät, Helsinki
Medal record
Representing Finland
Women's speed skating
Olympic Games
Gold medal – first place	1968 Grenoble	1500 m
Silver medal – second place	1968 Grenoble	3000 m
Silver medal – second place	1964 Innsbruck	1500 m
Bronze medal – third place	1964 Innsbruck	1000 m
World Championships
Bronze medal – third place	1964 Kristinehamn	1500 m
Bronze medal – third place	1967 Deventer	1500 m
Bronze medal – third place	1967 Deventer	3000 m
Bronze medal – third place	1968 Helsinki	3000 m

Kaija Marja Mustonen (born 4 August 1941) is a Finnish former speed skater.

Mustonen was born in Helsinki. After winning silver and bronze at the 1964 Winter Olympics of Innsbruck, she went on to win gold and silver at the 1968 Winter Olympics of Grenoble. This was the only Finnish gold medal at those games and the last Olympic gold for Finland in speed skating up to at least 2015. Her Olympic performance was acknowledged by naming her Finnish female athlete of the year in 1964 and 1968.

She competed in ten World Allround Championships from 1958 to 1968 (every year except 1959), but never won a medal in the final classification, a fourth place in 1964 being her best result. She did win four distance medals though, all bronze, in the days when there was not yet a separate world championship for each distance. Nationally, she won seven all-around titles between 1962 and 1968.

== Personal records ==
Personal records
Distance	Time	Place	Date
500 m	45.6	Inzell	2 Mar 1968
1,000 m	1:31.5	Inzell	10 Mar 1968
1,500 m	2:20.1	Inzell	2 Mar 1968
3,000 m	5:00.7	Inzell	10 Mar 1968
Mini combination	190.367	Inzell	2/3 Mar 1968

Best times in Finland
Distance	Time	Place	Date
500 m	46.8	Rovaniemi	21 Mar 1968
1,000 m	1:35.0	Rovaniemi	22 Mar 1968
1,500 m	2:28.8	Helsinki-Kallio	27 Feb 1968
3,000 m	5:14.8	Helsinki-Pirkkola	28 Jan 1968
Mini combination	197.016	Rovaniemi	22/23 Mar 1968
