= Biathlon at the 1968 Winter Olympics – Individual =

Men's biathlon individual at the X Olympic Winter Games
- Venue: Autrans
- Dates: 12 February 1968
- Competitors: 60 from 16 nations
- Winning time: 1:13:45.9

Medalists
1st place, gold medalist(s)		Magnar Solberg	Norway
2nd place, silver medalist(s)		Aleksandr Tikhonov	Soviet Union
3rd place, bronze medalist(s)		Vladimir Gundartsev	Soviet Union

The men's 20 kilometre individual biathlon competition at the 1968 Winter Olympics was held on 12 February, at Autrans. Each miss of the target cost two minutes, while hitting the outer circle cost one minute.

== Results ==
Two relatively inexperienced biathletes dominated the individual event. Magnar Solberg was one of only two men to shoot clear, and had the second fastest ski time, more than two minutes faster than the third best time. Aleksandr Tikhonov skied a minute faster than Solberg, but took two minutes in penalties, and ended up with silver, nearly four minutes ahead of their closest pursuer. Vladimir Gundartsev took bronze for the Soviet union, two minutes in penalties complementing the fifth-fastest ski time. Defending world champion Viktor Mamatov, and world silver medalist Stanisław Szczepaniak each took just one minute in penalties, but their ski times left them on the outside of the medals, Szczepaniak in 4th and Mamatov in 7th.

Rank	Bib	Name	Country	Ski Time	Penalties	Result	Deficit
1st place, gold medalist(s)	3	Magnar Solberg	Norway	1:13:45.9	0 (0+0+0+0)	1:13:45.9	–
2nd place, silver medalist(s)	1	Aleksandr Tikhonov	Soviet Union	1:12:40.4	2 (1+1+0+0)	1:14:40.4	+54.5
3rd place, bronze medalist(s)	31	Vladimir Gundartsev	Soviet Union	1:16:27.4	2 (0+0+1+1)	1:18:27.4	+4:41.5
4	2	Stanisław Szczepaniak	Poland	1:17:56.8	1 (0+0+1+0)	1:18:56.8	+5:10.9
5	25	Arve Kinnari	Finland	1:17:47.9	2 (0+0+1+1)	1:19:47.9	+6:02.0
6	16	Nikolay Puzanov	Soviet Union	1:17:14.5	3 (0+1+1+1)	1:20:14.5	+6:28.6
7	58	Viktor Mamatov	Soviet Union	1:19:20.8	1 (1+0+0+0)	1:20:20.8	+6:34.9
8	17	Stanisław Łukaszczyk	Poland	1:16:28.1	4 (2+1+1+0)	1:20:28.1	+6:42.2
9	38	Kalevi Vähäkylä	Finland	1:17:56.5	3 (0+2+0+1)	1:20:56.5	+7:10.6
10	8	Horst Koschka	East Germany	1:18:37.7	3 (1+1+1+0)	1:21:37.7	+7:51.8
11	42	Jon Istad	Norway	1:19:43.1	2 (0+1+1+0)	1:21:43.1	+7:57.2
12	5	Theo Merkel	West Germany	1:18:10.5	4 (3+0+1+0)	1:22:10.5	+8:24.6
13	57	Ola Wærhaug	Norway	1:19:12.9	3 (0+2+1+0)	1:22:12.9	+8:27.0
14	11	Constantin Carabela	Romania	1:22:52.2	0 (0+0+0+0)	1:22:52.2	+9:06.3
15	40	Pavel Ploc	Czechoslovakia	1:18:05.0	5 (1+0+0+4)	1:23:05.0	+9:19.1
16	6	Roger Bean	Great Britain	1:19:07.5	5 (2+3+0+0)	1:24:07.5	+10:21.6
17	10	Lars-Göran Arwidson	Sweden	1:18:08.9	6 (0+3+0+3)	1:24:08.9	+10:23.0
18	19	Dieter Speer	East Germany	1:18:13.3	6 (2+2+1+1)	1:24:13.3	+10:27.4
19	24	Olle Petrusson	Sweden	1:18:31.2	6 (3+0+2+1)	1:24:31.2	+10:45.3
20	41	Holmfrid Olsson	Sweden	1:19:01.8	6 (2+2+2+0)	1:25:01.8	+11:15.9
21	53	Hansjörg Knauthe	East Germany	1:23:04.9	2 (1+1+0+0)	1:25:04.9	+11:19.0
22	26	Vilmoş Gheorghe	Romania	1:20:07.3	6 (3+0+3+0)	1:26:07.3	+12:21.4
23	50	Gheorghe Cimpoia	Romania	1:25:36.5	1 (0+0+1+0)	1:26:36.5	+12:50.6
24	44	Heinz Kluge	East Germany	1:19:55.2	7 (0+1+1+5)	1:26:55.2	+13:09.3
25	14	Yrjö Salpakari	Finland	1:20:11.6	7 (2+1+2+2)	1:27:11.6	+13:25.7
26	28	Ragnar Tveiten	Norway	1:16:17.4	11 (4+0+2+5)	1:27:17.4	+13:31.5
27	29	Ralph Wakley	United States	1:22:32.9	5 (1+1+3+0)	1:27:32.9	+13:47.0
28	27	Miki Shibuya	Japan	1:21:37.1	6 (1+1+4+0)	1:27:37.1	+13:51.2
29	39	Nicolae Bărbăşescu	Romania	1:24:05.3	4 (2+0+0+2)	1:28:05.3	+14:19.4
30	60	Nore Westin	Sweden	1:21:09.4	7 (1+2+2+2)	1:28:09.4	+14:23.5
31	54	Mauno Luukkonen	Finland	1:19:15.8	9 (4+2+3+0)	1:28:15.8	+14:29.9
32	35	Gerhard Gehring	West Germany	1:20:26.8	8 (2+1+2+3)	1:28:26.8	+14:40.9
33	9	Isao Ono	Japan	1:20:47.8	8 (2+0+1+5)	1:28:47.8	+15:01.9
34	46	Shozo Okuyama	Japan	1:21:51.0	7 (3+0+2+2)	1:28:51.0	+15:05.1
35	30	Jean-Claude Viry	France	1:19:16.2	10 (2+4+1+3)	1:29:16.2	+15:30.3
36	34	Frederick Andrew	Great Britain	1:22:21.3	7 (1+0+2+4)	1:29:21.3	+15:35.4
37	4	Bill Spencer	United States	1:20:17.7	10 (2+3+1+4)	1:30:17.7	+16:31.8
38	32	Bayanjavyn Damdinjav	Mongolia	1:24:30.7	6 (1+3+1+1)	1:30:30.7	+16:44.8
39	23	Xaver Kraus	West Germany	1:18:40.2	12 (4+3+2+3)	1:30:40.2	+16:54.3
40	37	Paul Ernst	Austria	1:25:47.9	6 (1+4+1+0)	1:31:47.9	+18:02.0
41	49	Herbert Hindelang	West Germany	1:21:48.5	10 (3+5+1+1)	1:31:48.5	+18:02.6
42	13	Aimé Gruet-Masson	France	1:20:50.4	11 (3+4+3+1)	1:31:50.4	+18:04.5
43	51	Hajime Yoshimura	Japan	1:23:05.5	9 (3+3+2+1)	1:32:05.5	+18:19.6
44	18	Alan Notley	Great Britain	1:25:23.1	7 (7+0+0+0)	1:32:23.1	+18:37.2
45	48	Edward Williams	United States	1:23:24.5	9 (2+5+0+2)	1:32:24.5	+18:38.6
46	7	Esko Karu	Canada	1:21:42.9	11 (1+3+2+5)	1:32:42.9	+18:57.0
47	55	Horst Schneider	Austria	1:24:49.6	9 (3+2+1+3)	1:33:49.6	+20:03.7
48	47	Józef Stopka	Poland	1:22:17.7	12 (4+4+3+1)	1:34:17.7	+20:31.8
49	33	Jonathan Chaffee	United States	1:23:21.1	11 (3+2+4+2)	1:34:21.1	+20:35.2
50	20	Adolf Scherwitzl	Austria	1:30:21.7	4 (2+0+1+1)	1:34:21.7	+20:35.8
51	43	George Ede	Canada	1:26:41.8	8 (2+2+4+0)	1:34:41.8	+20:55.9
52	21	Bizyaagiin Dashgai	Mongolia	1:26:55.8	8 (5+2+1+0)	1:34:55.8	+21:09.9
53	52	James Boyde	Canada	1:27:02.0	8 (3+2+2+1)	1:35:02.0	+21:16.1
54	15	George Rattai	Canada	1:24:03.0	11 (1+5+2+3)	1:35:03.0	+21:17.1
55	22	Ladislav Žižka	Czechoslovakia	1:21:45.3	14 (7+5+0+2)	1:35:45.3	+21:59.4
56	12	Franz Vetter	Austria	1:16:25.0	20 (5+5+5+5)	1:36:25.0	+22:39.1
57	59	Louis Romand	France	1:25:55.2	12 (4+2+3+3)	1:37:55.2	+24:09.3
58	36	Guy Duraffourg	France	1:23:51.4	18 (5+7+4+2)	1:41:51.4	+28:05.5
59	56	Marcus Halliday	Great Britain	1:23:40.5	19 (5+1+7+6)	1:42:40.5	+28:54.6
–	45	Józef Gąsienica-Sobczak	Poland	DNF			
