= Biathlon at the 1968 Winter Olympics – Relay =

Men's biathlon relay at the X Olympic Winter Games
- Venue: Autrans
- Dates: 15 February 1968
- Competitors: 56 from 14 nations
- Winning time: 2:13:02.4

Medalists
1st place, gold medalist(s)		Soviet Union; Alexander Tikhonov; Nikolay Puzanov; Viktor Mamatov; Vladimir Gundartsev
2nd place, silver medalist(s)		Norway; Ola Wærhaug; Olav Jordet; Magnar Solberg; Jon Istad
3rd place, bronze medalist(s)		Sweden; Lars-Göran Arwidson; Tore Eriksson; Olle Petrusson; Holmfrid Olsson

The Men's 4 × 7.5 kilometre biathlon relay competition at the 1968 Winter Olympics took place on 15 February, at Autrans. Each national team consisted of four members, with each skiing 7.5 kilometres and shooting twice, once prone and once standing. This was the first time the biathlon relay was contested in the Olympic program.

== Results ==
Norway had won the first two official relay competitions at the Biathlon World Championships, but in Grenoble they were forced to ski five penalty loops while the Soviet Union skied only two, allowing the Soviets to pull away to win by almost two minutes. Sweden didn't go on the penalty loop at all, the only team to do so, and while their skiing could not match the top two, they did manage to finish in the bronze medal spot, just as they had in the two previous world championship relays.

Rank	Bib	Team	Penalties	Result	Deficit
1st place, gold medalist(s)	4	Soviet Union; Alexander Tikhonov; Nikolay Puzanov; Viktor Mamatov; Vladimir Gundartsev	2; 1; 1; 0; 0	2:13:02.4	–
2nd place, silver medalist(s)	7	Norway; Ola Wærhaug; Olav Jordet; Magnar Solberg; Jon Istad	5; 1; 2; 0; 2	2:14:50.2	+1:47.8
3rd place, bronze medalist(s)	12	Sweden; Lars-Göran Arwidson; Tore Eriksson; Olle Petrusson; Holmfrid Olsson	0; 0; 0; 0; 0	2:17:26.3	+4:23.9
4	2	Poland; Józef Różak; Andrzej Fiedor; Stanisław Łukaszczyk; Stanisław Szczepaniak	4; 2; 1; 1; 0	2:20:19.6	+7:17.2
5	1	Finland; Juhani Suutarinen; Heikki Flöjt; Kalevi Vähäkylä; Arve Kinnari	5; 3; 1; 0; 1	2:20:41.8	+7:39.4
6	3	East Germany; Heinz Kluge; Hans-Gert Jahn; Horst Koschka; Dieter Speer	4; 1; 1; 0; 2	2:21:54.5	+8:52.1
7	8	Romania; Gheorghe Cimpoia; Constantin Carabela; Nicolae Bărbăşescu; Vilmoş Gheorghe	4; 0; 0; 4; 0	2:25:39.8	+12:37.4
8	13	United States; Ralph Wakley; Edward Williams; Bill Spencer; John Ehrensbeck	8; 2; 4; 1; 1	2:28:35.5	+15:33.1
9	6	West Germany; Herbert Hindelang; Theo Merkel; Xaver Kraus; Gerhard Gehring	6; 2; 0; 2; 2	2:29:56.6	+16:54.2
10	9	France; Daniel Claudon; Serge Legrand; Aimé Gruet-Masson; Jean-Claude Viry	10; 2; 3; 3; 2	2:31:12.9	+18:10.5
11	11	Austria; Paul Ernst; Adolf Scherwitzl; Horst Schneider; Franz Vetter	10; 1; 0; 1; 8	2:33:47.1	+20:44.7
12	10	Great Britain; Marcus Halliday; Alan Notley; Peter Tancock; Frederick Andrew	9; 1; 2; 5; 1	2:34:40.9	+21:38.5
13	14	Japan; Isao Ono; Miki Shibuya; Shozo Okuyama; Hajime Yoshimura	9; 2; 0; 5; 2	2:35:21.0	+22:18.6
–	5	Canada; George Ede; Knowles McGill; George Rattai; Esko Karu	DNF		
