= Great Britain at the 1968 Winter Olympics =

- Flag of the United Kingdom
- IOC code: GBR
- NOC: British Olympic Association

in Grenoble
- Competitors: 38 (28 men, 10 women) in 7 sports
- Flag bearers: Robin Dixon (opening); Gina Hathorn (closing)
- Medals: Gold 0 Silver 0 Bronze 0 Total 0

Winter Olympics appearances (overview)
- 1924; 1928; 1932; 1936; 1948; 1952; 1956; 1960; 1964; 1968; 1972; 1976; 1980; 1984; 1988; 1992; 1994; 1998; 2002; 2006; 2010; 2014; 2018; 2022; 2026

The United Kingdom of Great Britain and Northern Ireland competed as Great Britain at the 1968 Winter Olympics in Grenoble, France. Great Britain did not win any medals at these games, the highest finish was fourth in Alpine Skiing.

== Alpine skiing ==
Men

Athlete	Event	Race 1		Race 2		Total	
Athlete	Event	Time	Rank	Time	Rank	Time	Rank
David Borradaile	Downhill					2:17.31	56
Luke O'Reilly	Downhill					2:10.99	50
Ian Todd	Downhill					2:10.00	44
Jeremy Palmer-Tomkinson	Downhill					2:05.43	25
Ian Todd	Giant Slalom	1:59.66	66	1:57.81	55	3:57.47	60
Julian Vasey	Giant Slalom	1:59.44	64	2:00.29	62	3:59.73	62
Luke O'Reilly	Giant Slalom	1:56.25	57	1:57.77	53	3:54.02	54
Jeremy Palmer-Tomkinson	Giant Slalom	1:53.24	47	1:51.06	24	3:44.20	35

Men's slalom

Athlete	Heat 1		Heat 2		Final					
Athlete	Time	Rank	Time	Rank	Time 1	Rank	Time 2	Rank	Total	Rank
Julian Vasey	56.02	4	1:00.24	2	did not advance					
Luke O'Reilly	54.35	4	56.61	2	did not advance					
Ian Todd	57.53	4	57:58	2	did not advance					
Jeremy Palmer-Tomkinson	54.35	3	56.14	1 QF	54.19	36	1:06.93	32	2:01.12	30

Women

Athlete	Event	Race 1		Race 2		Total	
Athlete	Event	Time	Rank	Time	Rank	Time	Rank
Divina Galica	Downhill					1:49.39	32
Helen Jamieson	Downhill					1:48.03	26
Gina Hathorn	Downhill					1:44.36	15
Felicity Field	Downhill					1:42.79	6
Helen Jamieson	Giant Slalom					2:02.99	30
Gina Hathorn	Giant Slalom					2:00.80	26
Felicity Field	Giant Slalom					2:00.55	24
Divina Galica	Giant Slalom					1:56.58	8
Divina Galica	Slalom	DNF	–	–	–	DNF	–
Diana Tomkinson	Slalom	48.31	28	52.62	22	1:40.93	23
Felicity Field	Slalom	44.41	17	48.97	14	1:33.38	14
Gina Hathorn	Slalom	41.84	5	46.08	4	1:27.92	4

== Biathlon ==
Men

Event	Athlete	Time	Penalties	Adjusted time ^{1}	Rank
20 km	Marcus Halliday	1'23:40.5	19	1'42:40.5	59
20 km	Alan Notley	1'25:23.1	7	1'32:23.1	44
20 km	Frederick Andrew	1'22:21.3	7	1'29:21.3	36
20 km	Roger Bean	1'19:07.5	5	1'24:07.5	16

^{1} One minute added per close miss (a hit in the outer ring), two minutes added per complete miss.

Men's 4 x 7.5 km relay

Athletes	Race		
Athletes	Misses ^{2}	Time	Rank
Marcus Halliday; Alan Notley; Peter Tancock; Frederick Andrew	9	2'34:40.9	12

^{2} A penalty loop of 200 metres had to be skied per missed target.

== Bobsleigh ==
Sled	Athletes	Event	Run 1		Run 2		Run 3		Run 4		Total	
Sled	Athletes	Event	Time	Rank	Time	Rank	Time	Rank	Time	Rank	Time	Rank
GBR-1	Tony Nash; Robin Dixon	Two-man	1:10.57	3	1:11.60	5	1:11.77	8	1:11.22	3	4:45.16	5
GBR-2	John Blockey; Mike Freeman	Two-man	1:12.06	13	1:12.25	11	1:13.79	19	1:13.17	16	4:51.27	15

Sled	Athletes	Event	Run 1		Run 2		Total	
Sled	Athletes	Event	Time	Rank	Time	Rank	Time	Rank
GBR-1	Tony Nash; Guy Renwick; Robin Widdows; Robin Dixon	Four-man	1:10.45	4	1:08.39	9	2:18.84	8
GBR-2	John Blockey; John Brown; Tim Thorn; Mike Freeman	Four-man	1:11.52	15	1:08.67	12	2:20.19	14

== Cross-country skiing ==
Men

Event	Athlete	Race	
Event	Athlete	Time	Rank
15 km	Peter Tancock	57:31.1	59
15 km	Victor Dakin	56:49.9	58

== Figure skating ==
Men

Athlete	CF	FS	Points	Places	Rank
Haig Oundjian	19	13	1639.5	154	17
Michael Williams	15	15	1650.9	147	15

Women

Athlete	CF	FS	Points	Places	Rank
Frances Waghorn	22	28	1557.2	211	24
Patricia Dodd	9	27	1634.6	140	15
Sally-Anne Stapleford	7	17	1680.9	105	11

Pairs

Athletes	SP	FS	Points	Places	Rank
Linda Bernard; Raymond Wilson	18	18	251.2	160	18

== Luge ==
Men

Athlete	Run 1		Run 2		Run 3		Total	
Athlete	Time	Rank	Time	Rank	Time	Rank	Time	Rank
James Manclark	1:02.99	41	1:03.12	41	1:01.83	40	3:07.94	40
Richard Liversedge	1:02.83	40	1:02.81	39	1:01.40	36	3:07.04	39

== Speed skating ==
Men

Event	Athlete	Race	
Event	Athlete	Time	Rank
500 m	David Bodington	DNF	–
500 m	Geoff Stockdale	42.1	26
500 m	John Tipper	41.5	19
1500 m	David Bodington	2:19.1	53
1500 m	Geoff Stockdale	2:15.6	43
1500 m	John Tipper	2:12.4	28
5000 m	John Blewitt	7:59.8	27

Women

Event	Athlete	Race	
Event	Athlete	Time	Rank
1000 m	Patricia Tipper	1:46.5	29
3000 m	Patricia Tipper	5:49.0	26
