= Ola Wærhaug =

Norwegian biathlete (1937–2025)

Personal information
- Born: 24 December 1937 Skedsmo, Akershus, Norway
- Died: 9 October 2025 (aged 87)
- Height: 1.75 m (5 ft 9 in)

Sport

Professional information
- Sport: Biathlon
- Club: Heimevernsdistrikt 04

Olympic Games
- Teams: 3 (1960, 1964, 1968)
- Medals: 1 (0 gold)

World Championships
- Teams: 4 (1962, 1965, 1966, 1967)
- Medals: 2 (2 gold)
Medal record
Men's biathlon
Representing Norway
Olympic Games
Silver medal – second place	1968 Grenoble	4 × 7.5 km relay
World Championships
Gold medal – first place	1965 Elverum	Team event
Gold medal – first place	1967 Altenberg	4 × 7.5 km relay

Ola Wærhaug (24 December 1937 – 9 October 2025) was a Norwegian biathlete. He received a silver medal at the 1968 Winter Olympics in Grenoble. He participated on the winning teams at the 1965 and at the 1967 Biathlon World Championships.

== Life and career ==
Wærhaug competed for Norway at the 1960 Winter Olympics, where he placed seventh in 20 km biathlon. At the 1964 Winter Olympics he also competed in 20 km biathlon, placing 22nd.

He won a team gold medal at the Biathlon World Championships 1965 in Elverum, along with Olav Jordet, Ragnar Tveiten, and Ivar Nordkild. He won a gold medal in the relay at the Biathlon World Championships 1967 in Altenberg, Saxony, along with Jordet, Jon Istad, and Tveiten.

At the 1968 Winter Olympics he won a silver medal in the biathlon relay (4 × 7.5 km) with the Norwegian team, along with Olav Jordet, Magnar Solberg and Jon Istad. The biathlon relay was a new Olympic discipline in 1968, and Norway placed second behind Soviet, ahead of Sweden.

After his active career, Wærhaug settled as farmer in Skedsmo.

Wærhaug died on 9 October 2025, at the age of 87.

== Biathlon results ==
All results are sourced from the International Biathlon Union.

=== Olympic Games ===
1 medal (1 silver)

Event	Individual	Relay
(United States) 1960 Squaw Valley	7th	—N/a
(Austria) 1964 Innsbruck	22nd	—N/a
(France) 1968 Grenoble	13th	Silver

*The relay was added as an event in 1968.

=== World Championships ===
2 medals (2 gold)

Event	Individual	Team (time)	Relay
(Finland) 1962 Hämeenlinna	23rd	—	—N/a
(Norway) 1965 Elverum	4th	Gold	—N/a
(West Germany) 1966 Garmisch-Partenkirchen	23rd	—N/a	—
(East Germany) 1967 Altenberg	5th	—N/a	Gold

*During Olympic seasons competitions are only held for those events not included in the Olympic program.
**The team (time) event was removed in 1965, whilst the relay was added in 1966.
