= Soviet Union at the 1968 Winter Olympics =

- Flag of the Soviet Union
- IOC code: URS (SOV used at these Games)
- NOC: Soviet Olympic Committee

in Grenoble
- Competitors: 74 (53 men, 21 women) in 8 sports
- Flag bearer: Viktor Mamatov (biathlon)
- Medals Ranked 2nd: Gold 5 Silver 5 Bronze 3 Total 13

Winter Olympics appearances (overview)
- 1956; 1960; 1964; 1968; 1972; 1976; 1980; 1984; 1988

Other related appearances
- Latvia (1924–1936, 1992–pres.); Estonia (1928–1936, 1992–pres.); Lithuania (1928, 1992–pres.); Unified Team (1992); Armenia (1994–pres.); Belarus (1994–2022); Georgia (1994–pres.); Kazakhstan (1994–pres.); Kyrgyzstan (1994–pres.); Moldova (1994–pres.); Russia (1994–2014); Ukraine (1994–pres.); Uzbekistan (1994–pres.); Azerbaijan (1998–pres.); Tajikistan (2002–pres.); Olympic Athletes from Russia (2018); ROC (2022); Individual Neutral Athletes (2026)

The Soviet Union (USSR) competed at the 1968 Winter Olympics in Grenoble, France.

== Medalists ==
Medal	Name	Sport	Event
Gold	Aleksandr Tikhonov; Nikolay Puzanov; Viktor Mamatov; Vladimir Gundartsev	Biathlon	Men's 4 x 7.5 km relay
Gold	Liudmila Belousova; Oleg Protopopov	Figure skating	Pairs
Gold	Soviet Union men's national ice hockey team: Viktor Konovalenko; Viktor Zinger; Viktor Blinov; Vitalij Davidov; Viktor Kuzkin; Alexandr Ragulin; Oleg Zaytsev; Igor Romishevsky; Anatolij Firsov; Vyacheslav Starshinov; Viktor Polupanov; Vladimir Vikulov; Venjamin Alexandrov; Yury Moiseyev; Yevgeni Mishakov; Yevgeni Zimin; Anatoly Ionov; Boris Majorov	Ice hockey	Men's competition
Gold	Vladimir Belousov	Ski jumping	Men's large hill
Gold	Lyudmila Titova	Speed skating	Women's 500 m
Silver	Aleksandr Tikhonov	Biathlon	Men's 20 km
Silver	Vyacheslav Vedenin	Cross-country skiing	Men's 50 km
Silver	Galina Kulakova	Cross-country skiing	Women's 5 km
Silver	Tatiana Zhuk; Alexander Gorelik	Figure skating	Pairs
Silver	Lyudmila Titova	Speed skating	Women's 1000 m
Bronze	Vladimir Gundartsev	Biathlon	Men's 20 km
Bronze	Alevtina Kolchina	Cross-country skiing	Women's 5 km
Bronze	Alevtina Kolchina; Rita Achkina; Galina Kulakova	Cross-country skiing	Women's 3 x 5 km relay

== Alpine skiing ==
Men

Athlete	Event	Race 1		Race 2		Total	
Athlete	Event	Time	Rank	Time	Rank	Time	Rank
Vasily Melnikov	Downhill					DSQ	–
Andrey Belokrinkin	Downhill					2:10.98	49
Viktor Belyakov	Downhill					2:09.32	40
Andrey Belokrinkin	Giant Slalom	1:56.47	59	1:56.36	46	3:52.83	52
Viktor Belyakov	Giant Slalom	1:52.72	54	1:53.55	39	3:49.27	46
Vasily Melnikov	Giant Slalom	1:52.42	42	1:56.55	47	3:48.97	45

Men's slalom

Athlete	Heat 1		Heat 2		Final					
Athlete	Time	Rank	Time	Rank	Time 1	Rank	Time 2	Rank	Total	Rank
Viktor Belyakov	58.05	4	55:56	2	did not advance					
Andrey Belokrinkin	57.46	2 QF	–	–	1:08.96	45	58.90	29	2:07.86	31
Vasily Melnikov	54.32	2 QF	–	–	54.94	38	59.48	30	1:54.42	26

Women

Athlete	Event	Race 1		Race 2		Total	
Athlete	Event	Time	Rank	Time	Rank	Time	Rank
Galina Sidorova	Downhill					1:51.74	35
Alfina Sukhanova	Downhill					1:48.74	29
Nina Merkulova	Downhill					1:48.04	27
Irina Turundayevskaya	Giant Slalom					DSQ	–
Nina Merkulova	Giant Slalom					2:12.71	40
Galina Sidorova	Giant Slalom					2:12.01	39
Alfina Sukhanova	Giant Slalom					2:06.48	34
Nina Merkulova	Slalom	n/a	?	DSQ	–	DSQ	–
Galina Sidorova	Slalom	49.63	30	53.26	24	1:42.89	26
Alfina Sukhanova	Slalom	49.57	29	52.01	20	1:41.58	25
Irina Turundayevskaya	Slalom	46.60	25	51.66	19	1:38.26	19

== Biathlon ==
Men

Event	Athlete	Time	Penalties	Adjusted time ^{1}	Rank
20 km	Viktor Mamatov	1'19:20.8	1	1'20:20.8	7
20 km	Nikolay Puzanov	1'17:14.5	3	1'20:14.5	6
20 km	Vladimir Gundartsev	1'16:27.4	2	1'18:27.4	3rd place, bronze medalist(s)
20 km	Aleksandr Tikhonov	1'12:40.4	2	1'14:40.4	2nd place, silver medalist(s)

Men's 4 x 7.5 km relay

Athletes	Race		
Athletes	Misses ^{2}	Time	Rank
Aleksandr Tikhonov; Nikolay Puzanov; Viktor Mamatov; Vladimir Gundartsev	2	2'13:02.4	1st place, gold medalist(s)

== Cross-country skiing ==
Men

Event	Athlete	Race	
Event	Athlete	Time	Rank
15 km	Fyodor Simashov	51:05.3	26
15 km	Vladimir Voronkov	50:40.7	22
15 km	Anatoly Akentyev	50:19.9	16
15 km	Valery Tarakanov	49:04.4	9
30 km	Valery Tarakanov	1'39:25.0	17
30 km	Vyacheslav Vedenin	1'38:36.1	14
30 km	Anatoly Akentyev	1'37:52.4	10
30 km	Vladimir Voronkov	1'37:10.8	4
50 km	Igor Voronchikhin	2'40:48.2	31
50 km	Anatoly Akentyev	2'34:54.5	20
50 km	Vladimir Voronkov	2'33:07.3	16
50 km	Vyacheslav Vedenin	2'29:02.5	2nd place, silver medalist(s)

Men's 4 × 10 km relay

Athletes	Race	
Athletes	Time	Rank
Vladimir Voronkov; Anatoly Akentyev; Valery Tarakanov; Vyacheslav Vedenin	2'10:57.2	4

Women

Event	Athlete	Race	
Event	Athlete	Time	Rank
5 km	Alevtina Olyunina-Smirnova	17:43.2	20
5 km	Rita Achkina	16:55.1	6
5 km	Alevtina Kolchina	16:51.6	3rd place, bronze medalist(s)
5 km	Galina Kulakova	16:48.4	2nd place, silver medalist(s)
10 km	Faadiya Salimzhanova	39:17.9	13
10 km	Alevtina Olyunina-Smirnova	39:10.3	11
10 km	Alevtina Kolchina	38:52.9	7
10 km	Galina Kulakova	38:26.7	6

Women's 3 x 5 km relay

Athletes	Race	
Athletes	Time	Rank
Alevtina Kolchina; Rita Achkina; Galina Kulakova	58:13.6	3rd place, bronze medalist(s)

== Figure skating ==
Men

Athlete	CF	FS	Points	Places	Rank
Sergei Volkov	16	17	1632.0	158	18
Sergei Chetverukhin	11	11	1737.0	93	9

Women

Athlete	CF	FS	Points	Places	Rank
Galina Grzhibovskaya	25	11	1628.5	144	16
Elena Shcheglova	13	10	1670.4	110	12

Pairs

Athletes	SP	FS	Points	Places	Rank
Tamara Moskvina; Alexei Mishin	6	5	300.3	44	5
Tatiana Zhuk; Alexander Gorelik	2	2	312.3	17	2nd place, silver medalist(s)
Liudmila Belousova; Oleg Protopopov	1	1	315.2	10	1st place, gold medalist(s)

== Ice hockey ==
=== Medal round ===
Rank	Team	Pld	W	L	T	GF	GA	Pts
1	Soviet Union (gold)	7	6	1	0	48	10	12
2	Czechoslovakia	7	5	1	1	33	17	11
3	Canada	7	5	2	0	28	15	10
4	Sweden	7	4	2	1	23	18	9
5	Finland	7	3	3	1	17	23	7
6	United States	7	2	4	1	23	28	5
7	West Germany	7	1	6	0	13	39	2
8	East Germany	7	0	7	0	13	48	0

(Soviet Union) USSR – Finland 8:0 (3:0, 2:0, 3:0)
Goalscorers: Staršinov 2, Mišakov 2, Zimin 2, Firsov, Polupanov.
Referees: Bucala, Kořínek (TCH)

(Soviet Union) USSR – East Germany 9:0 (4:0, 2:0, 3:0)
Goalscorers: Firsov 3, Vikulov 2, Mishakov, Starshinov, Alexandrov, Zaytsev.
Referees: Wycisk (POL), Johannessen (NOR)

(Soviet Union) USSR – (United States) USA 10:2 (6:0, 4:2, 0:0)
Goalscorers: Firsov 3, Blinov 2, Polupanov 2, Kuzkin, Starshinov, Moiseyev– Ross, Morrison.
Referees: Dahlberg (SWE), Kubinec (CAN)

(Soviet Union) USSR – West Germany 9:1 (4:1, 4:0, 1:0)
Goalscorers: Polupanov 2, Alexandrov 2, Ionov, Starshinov, Majorov, Moiseyev, Firsov – Funk.
Referees: Trumble (USA), Valentin (AUT)

(Soviet Union) USSR – Sweden 3:2 (1:1, 0:0, 2:1)
Goalscorers: Firsov 2, Blinov – Öberg, Svedberg.
Referees: Kubinec (CAN), Kořínek (TCH)

Czechoslovakia – (Soviet Union) USSR 5:4 (3:1, 1:1, 1:2)
Goalscorers: Ševčík, Hejma, Havel, Golonka, Jiřík – Majorov 2, Blinov, Polupanov.
Referees: Trumble (USA), Dahlberg (SWE)

(Soviet Union) USSR – Canada 5:0 (1:0, 1:0, 3:0)
Goalscorers: Firsov 2, Mishakov, Starshinov, Zimin.
Referees: Trumble (USA), Dahlberg (SWE)

=== Roster ===
(gold) USSR
Goaltenders: Viktor Konovalenko, Viktor Zinger.
Defence: Viktor Blinov, Vitalij Davidov, Viktor Kuzkin, Alexandr Ragulin, Oleg Zaytsev, Igor Romiševskij.
Forwards: Anatolij Firsov, Vyacheslav Starshinov, Viktor Polupanov, Vladimir Vikulov, Venjamin Alexandrov, Yury Moiseyev, Yevgeni Mishakov, Yevgeni Zimin, Anatoly Ionov, Boris Majorov.
Coaches: Arkadij Černyšev, Anatolij Tarasov.

== Nordic combined ==
Events:

- normal hill ski jumping (Three jumps, best two counted and shown here.)
- 15 km cross-country skiing

Athlete	Event	Ski jumping				Cross-country			Total	
Athlete	Event	Distance 1	Distance 2	Points	Rank	Time	Points	Rank	Points	Rank
Mikhail Artyukhov	Individual	66.0	69.0	192.4	26	51:32.4	199.50	20	391.90	19
Tõnu Haljand	Individual	68.5	70.0	202.8	17	50:40.5	209.88	12	412.68	12
Robert Makara	Individual	72.5	74.0	222.8	5	51:09.3	204.12	17	426.92	7
Vyacheslav Dryagin	Individual	71.5	74.5	222.8	5	51:22.0	201.58	19	424.38	8

== Ski jumping ==
Athlete	Event	Jump 1		Jump 2		Total	
Athlete	Event	Distance	Points	Distance	Points	Points	Rank
Vladimir Smirnov	Normal hill	69.5	89.5	70.0 (fall)	58.8	148.3	55
Vladimir Belousov	Normal hill	73.5	102.9	73.0	104.6	207.5	8
Gary Napalkov	Normal hill	75.0	104.3	73.0	101.1	205.4	14
Anatoly Zheglanov	Normal hill	79.5	110.0	74.5	101.5	211.5	6
Vladimir Smirnov	Large hill	88.0	89.1	83.5	80.8	169.9	41
Gary Napalkov	Large hill	96.5	107.0	90.5	96.1	203.1	11
Anatoly Zheglanov	Large hill	99.0	108.5	92.0	97.2	205.7	8
Vladimir Belousov	Large hill	101.5	118.0	98.5	113.3	231.3	1st place, gold medalist(s)

== Speed skating ==
Men

Event	Athlete	Race	
Event	Athlete	Time	Rank
500 m	Valery Kaplan	41.6	21
500 m	Valery Muratov	41.4	18
500 m	Anatoly Lepeshkin	41.0	11
500 m	Yevgeny Grishin	40.6	4
1500 m	Valery Kaplan	2:07.2	12
1500 m	Ants Antson	2:07.2	12
1500 m	Aleksandr Kerchenko	2:07.1	11
1500 m	Eduard Matusevich	2:06.1	8
5000 m	Anatoly Mashkov	7:41.9	14
5000 m	Stanislav Selyanin	7:38.5	11
5000 m	Valery Lavrushkin	7:37.9	10
10000 m	Anatoly Mashkov	16:22.1	16
10000 m	Stanislav Selyanin	15:56.4	10
10000 m	Valery Lavrushkin	15:54.8	9

Women

Event	Athlete	Race	
Event	Athlete	Time	Rank
500 m	Tatyana Sidorova	46.9	9
500 m	Irina Yegorova	46.9	9
500 m	Lyudmila Titova	46.1	1st place, gold medalist(s)
1000 m	Lāsma Kauniste	1:35.3	11
1000 m	Irina Yegorova	1:34.4	5
1000 m	Lyudmila Titova	1:32.9	2nd place, silver medalist(s)
1500 m	Lidiya Skoblikova	2:27.6	11
1500 m	Lyudmila Titova	2:26.8	7
1500 m	Lāsma Kauniste	2:25.4	5
3000 m	Lāsma Kauniste	5:16.0	12
3000 m	Anna Sablina	5:12.5	8
3000 m	Lidiya Skoblikova	5:08.0	6

== Medals by republic ==
In the following table for team events number of team representatives, who received medals are counted, not "one medal for all the team", as usual. Because there were people from different republics in one team.

Rank	Nation	Gold	Silver	Bronze	Total
1	Russian SFSR	26	6	4	36
2	Belarusian SSR	0	0	1	1
Totals (2 entries)		26	6	5	37
