= Biathlon at the 1968 Winter Olympics =

Biathlon at the X Olympic Winter Games
- Venue: Autrans
- Dates: 12–15 February
- Competitors: 72 from 16 nations

Biathlon at the 1968 Winter Olympics consisted of two biathlon events, held at Autrans. The events began on 9 February and ended on 11 February 1968. This was the first Olympics to feature more than one biathlon race, as the 4 x 7.5 kilometre relay made its debut.

== Medal summary ==
Three nations won medals in biathlon, the Soviet Union leading the medal table with three, one of each type. Magnar Solberg and Alexander Tikhonov shared the lead in the individual medal table, each winning a gold and a silver.

=== Medal table ===
Rank	Nation	Gold	Silver	Bronze	Total
1	Soviet Union	1	1	1	3
2	Norway	1	1	0	2
3	Sweden	0	0	1	1
Totals (3 entries)		2	2	2	6

=== Events ===
Event	Gold		Silver		Bronze	
Individual	Magnar Solberg; Norway	1:13:45.9	Aleksandr Tikhonov; Soviet Union	1:14:40.4	Vladimir Gundartsev; Soviet Union	1:18:27.4
Relay	Soviet Union; Aleksandr Tikhonov; Nikolay Puzanov; Viktor Mamatov; Vladimir Gundartsev	2:13:02.4	Norway; Ola Wærhaug; Olav Jordet; Magnar Solberg; Jon Istad	2:14:50.2	Sweden; Lars-Göran Arwidson; Tore Eriksson; Olle Petrusson; Holmfrid Olsson	2:17:26.3

== Participating nations ==
Sixteen nations sent biathletes to compete in Grenoble. Below is a list of the competing nations; in parentheses are the number of national competitors. Canada, East and West Germany and Czechoslovakia made their Olympic biathlon debut.

- Austria (4)
- Canada (5)
- Finland (6)
- France (6)
- West Germany (4)
- Great Britain (5)
- East Germany (5)
- Japan (4)
- Mongolia (2)
- Norway (5)
- Poland (6)
- Romania (4)
- Sweden (5)
- Czechoslovakia (2)
- Soviet Union (4)
- United States (5)
