= Ian Todd =

Ian Todd may refer to:

- Ian Todd (alpine skier), British former alpine skier
- Ian Todd (footballer), Australian rules footballer
