= Ivar Nordkild =

Norwegian biathlete (born 1941)

Personal information
- Full name: Ivar Olaus Nordkild
- Born: 14 May 1941 (age 85) Vassdalen, Narvik, Nordland, Reichskommissariat Norwegen (today Norway)
- Height: 1.73 m (5 ft 8 in)

Sport

Professional information
- Sport: Biathlon
- Club: Bjerkvik Idrettslag

Olympic Games
- Teams: 1 (1972)
- Medals: 0

World Championships
- Teams: 5 (1965, 1966, 1970, 1971, 1974)
- Medals: 3 (2 gold)
Medal record
Men's biathlon
Representing Norway
World Championships
| Gold medal – first place | 1965 Elverum | Team event |
| Gold medal – first place | 1966 Garmisch-Partenkirchen | 4 × 7.5 km relay |
| Silver medal – second place | 1971 Hämeenlinna | 4 × 7.5 km relay |

Ivar Olaus Nordkild (born 14 May 1941) is a former Norwegian biathlete. He competed for Norway and won a gold medal in the 1965 Biathlon World Championships in Elverum in the team competition. He won a second gold medal in the men's relay in the 1966 world championships in Garmisch-Partenkirchen and a silver medal in the same event in 1971.

He represented Norway at the 1972 Winter Olympics, skiing third leg in the relay, with teammates Tor Svendsberget, Kåre Hovda and Magnar Solberg, where the Norwegian team placed fourth.

== Biathlon results ==
All results are sourced from the International Biathlon Union.

=== Olympic Games ===
| Event | Individual | Relay |
|---|---|---|
| (Japan) 1972 Sapporo | — | 4th |

=== World Championships ===
3 medals (2 gold, 1 silver)

| Event | Individual | Sprint | Team (time) | Relay |
|---|---|---|---|---|
| (Norway) 1965 Elverum | 14th | —N/a | Gold | —N/a |
| (West Germany) 1966 Garmisch-Partenkirchen | — | —N/a | —N/a | Gold |
| (Sweden) 1970 Östersund | 11th | —N/a | —N/a | — |
| (Finland) 1971 Hämeenlinna | 14th | —N/a | —N/a | Silver |
| (Soviet Union) 1974 Minsk | 36th | — | —N/a | — |

*During Olympic seasons competitions are only held for those events not included in the Olympic program.
**The team (time) event was removed in 1965, whilst the relay was added in 1966, and the sprint was added in 1974.
