= Rozak =

Rozak is a surname. Notable people with the surname include:

- Józef Różak (born 1945), Polish biathlete
- Abdul Rozak Fachruddin (1916–1995), Indonesian Islamic religious leader
