= Artyukhov =

Artyukhov or Artiukhov (Russian: Артюхов) is a Russian surname. Notable people with the surname include:

== Artiukhov ==
- Mykhailo Artiukhov (born 1971), Ukrainian cross-country skier

== Artyukhov ==
- Dmitry Artyukhov (born 1988), Russian politician
- Mikhail Artyukhov (born 1943), Soviet Nordic combined skier
