= Biathlon World Championships 1971 =

Sports competition in Hämeenlinna-Tavastehus, Finland

- Host city: Hämeenlinna
- Country: Finland
- Events: 2
- Opening: 6 March 1971
- Closing: 7 March 1971

The 11th Biathlon World Championships were held in 1971 for the second time in Hämeenlinna-Tavastehus, Finland.

== Men's results ==
=== 20 km individual ===
Medal	Name	Nation	Penalties	Result
1st place, gold medalist(s)	Dieter Speer	GDR	2	1:18:20.2
2nd place, silver medalist(s)	Alexander Tikhonov	URS	3	1:18:48.4
3rd place, bronze medalist(s)	Magnar Solberg	NOR	0	1:20:00.9

=== 4 × 7.5 km relay ===
Medal	Name	Nation	Penalties	Result
1st place, gold medalist(s)	Soviet Union Alexander Tikhonov; Viktor Mamatov; Rinnat Safin; Nikolay Muzhytov	URS		
2nd place, silver medalist(s)	Norway Tor Svendsberget; Ragnar Tveiten; Magnar Solberg; Ivar Nordkild	NOR		
3rd place, bronze medalist(s)	Poland Józef Różak; Andrzej Rapacz; Aleksander Klima; Józef Stopka	POL		

== Medal table ==
Place	Nation	1st place, gold medalist(s)	2nd place, silver medalist(s)	3rd place, bronze medalist(s)	Total
1	Soviet Union	1	1	0	2
2	East Germany	1	0	0	1
3	Norway	0	1	1	2
4	Poland	0	0	1	1
