= Nore Westin =

Swedish biathlete (1937–2016)

Personal information
- Nationality: Swedish
- Born: 29 September 1937; Boden, Sweden
- Died: 9 February 2016 (aged 78)

Sport
- Sport: Biathlon

Nore Westin (29 September 1937 – 9 February 2016) was a Swedish biathlete. He competed in the 20 km individual event at the 1968 Winter Olympics.
