= Louis Romand =

French biathlete (1934–2000)

Personal information
- Nationality: French
- Born: 16 May 1934; Les Rousses, France
- Died: 19 June 2000 (aged 66)

Sport
- Sport: Biathlon

Louis Romand (16 May 1934 – 19 June 2000) was a French biathlete. He competed in the 20 km individual event at the 1968 Winter Olympics.
