= Nikolay Puzanov =

Soviet biathlete (1938–2008)

Personal information
- Full name: Nikolay Vasilyevich Puzanov
- Born: 7 April 1938 Kyshtym, RSFSR, Soviet Union
- Died: 2 January 2008 (aged 69) Saint Petersburg, Russia
- Height: 1.79 m (5 ft 10 in)

Sport

Professional information
- Sport: Biathlon
- Club: SKA St. Petersburg

Olympic Games
- Teams: 2 (1964, 1968)
- Medals: 1 (1 gold)

World Championships
- Teams: 6 (1962, 1963, 1965, 1966, 1967, 1969)
- Medals: 4 (1 gold)
Medal record
Men's biathlon
Representing Soviet Union
Olympic Games
Gold medal – first place	1968 Grenoble	4 × 7.5 km relay
World Championships
Gold medal – first place	1962 Hämeenlinna	Team event
Silver medal – second place	1965 Elverum	20 km individual
Silver medal – second place	1965 Elverum	Team event
Silver medal – second place	1967 Altenberg	4 × 7.5 km relay

Nikolay Vasilyevich Puzanov (Russian: Николай Васильевич Пузанов; 7 April 1938 – 3 January 2008) was a Soviet biathlete.

He was a 4 × 7.5 km relay gold medalist at the 1968 Winter Olympics in Grenoble, France.

== Biathlon results ==
All results are sourced from the International Biathlon Union.

=== Olympic Games ===
1 medal (1 gold)

Event	Individual	Relay
(Austria) 1964 Innsbruck	10th	—N/a
(France) 1968 Grenoble	6th	Gold

=== World Championships ===
4 medals (1 gold, 3 silver)

Event	Individual	Team (time)	Relay
(Finland) 1962 Hämeenlinna	4th	Gold	—N/a
(Austria) 1963 Seefeld	8th	—	—N/a
(Norway) 1965 Elverum	Silver	Silver	—N/a
(West Germany) 1966 Garmisch-Partenkirchen	13th	—N/a	4th
(East Germany) 1967 Altenberg	25th	—N/a	Silver
(Polish People's Republic) 1969 Zakopane	4th	—N/a	—

*During Olympic seasons competitions are only held for those events not included in the Olympic program.
**The team (time) event was removed in 1965, whilst the relay was added in 1966.
