= Autrans-Méaudre-en-Vercors =

- Commune
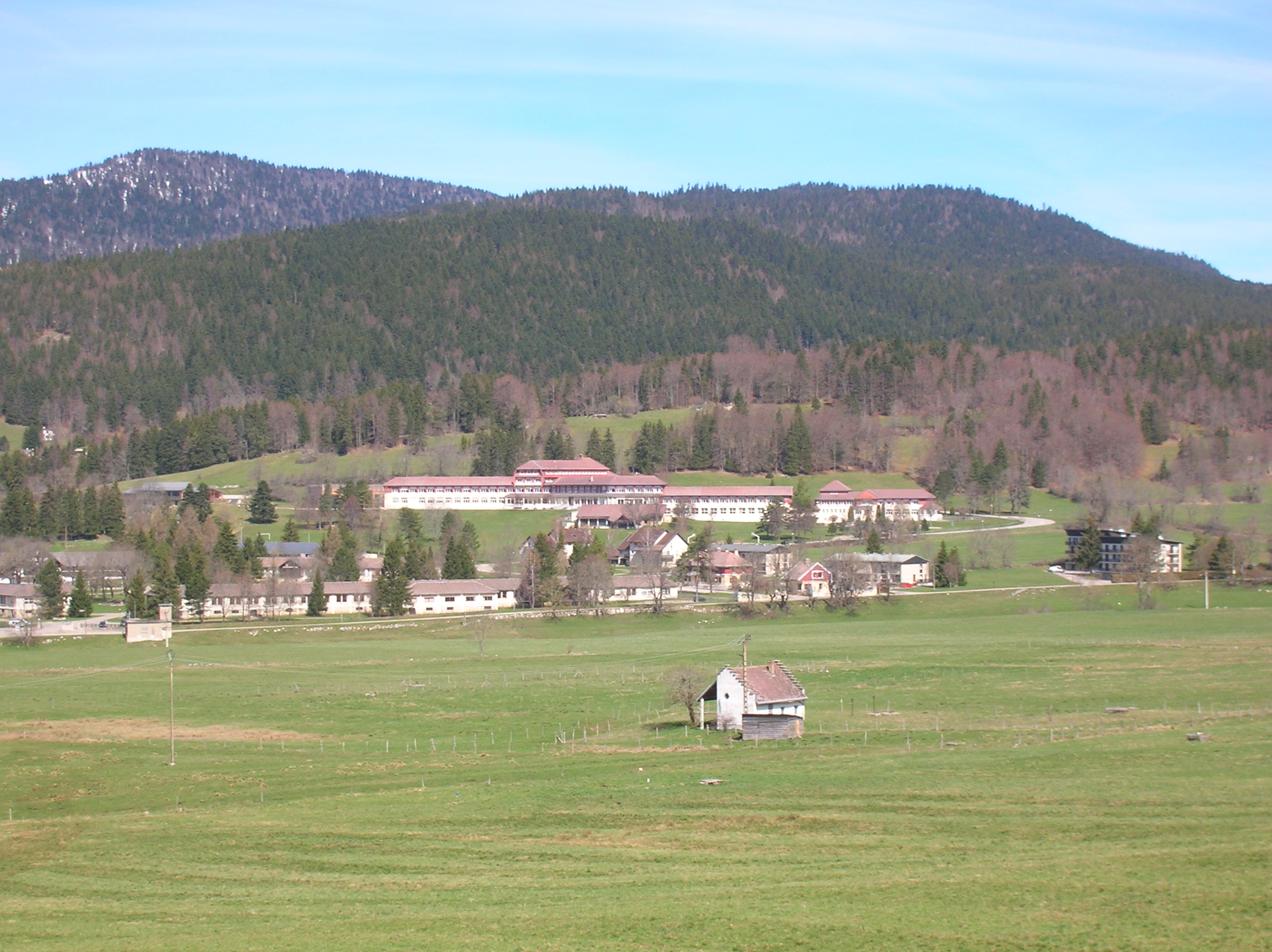
- A general view of Autrans
- Location of Autrans-Méaudre-en-Vercors
- Location within France Location within Auvergne-Rhône-Alpes
- Coordinates: 45°07′37″N 5°31′37″E
- Country: France
- Region: Auvergne-Rhône-Alpes
- Department: Isère
- Arrondissement: Grenoble
- Canton: Fontaine-Vercors
- Intercommunality: CC Massif Vercors

Government
  - Mayor (2020–2026): Hubert Arnaud
- Area^{1}: 77.89 km^{2} (30.07 sq mi)
- Population (2023): 2,936
  - Density: 37.69/km^{2} (97.63/sq mi)
- Time zone: UTC+01:00 (CET)
  - Summer (DST): UTC+02:00 (CEST)
- INSEE/Postal code: 38225 /38112, 38880
- ^{1} French Land Register data, which excludes lakes, ponds, glaciers > 1 km^{2} (0.386 sq mi or 247 acres) and river estuaries.

Autrans-Méaudre-en-Vercors is a commune in the Isère department of southeastern France. The municipality was established on 1 January 2016 and consists of the former communes of Autrans and Méaudre.

== Population ==
Population data refer to the commune in its geography as of January 2025.

Historical population
Year	Pop.	±% p.a.
1968	1,560	—
1975	1,918	+3.00%
1982	2,037	+0.86%
1990	2,246	+1.23%
1999	2,580	+1.55%
2007	2,912	+1.52%
2012	2,996	+0.57%
2017	3,000	+0.03%
2023	2,936	−0.36%
Source: INSEE

== See also ==
- Communes of the Isère department
