= Dieter Speer =

East German biathlete

Personal information
- Full name: Dieter Speer
- Born: 24 February 1942 (age 84) Legnica, Lower Silesia, Germany
- Height: 1.76 m (5 ft 9 in)

Sport

Professional information
- Sport: Biathlon
- Club: SG Dynamo Zinnwald

Olympic Games
- Teams: 2 (1968, 1972)
- Medals: 1 (0 gold)

World Championships
- Teams: 4 (1969, 1970, 1971, 1973)
- Medals: 3 (1 gold)
Medal record
Men's biathlon
Representing East Germany
Olympic Games
| Bronze medal – third place | 1972 Sapporo | 4 × 7.5 km relay |
World Championships
| Gold medal – first place | 1971 Hämeenlinna | 20 km individual |
| Bronze medal – third place | 1970 Östersund | 4 × 7.5 km relay |
| Bronze medal – third place | 1973 Lake Placid | 4 × 7.5 km relay |

Dieter Speer (born 24 February 1942) is a former East German biathlete.

He was the first German to hold the title when he became world champion in biathlon in 1971, beating the outstanding Alexander Tikhonov over 20 kilometres. Tikhonov could be said to be partly responsible for Speer's success, since the rifle was a gift from Tikhonov.

Speer was able to return the favour a year later at the 1972 Winter Olympics in Sapporo, lending Tikhonov his ski when the latter fell during the relay and broke a ski. In that event, the Russians won, and the East German team only got a bronze medal.

== Biathlon results ==
All results are sourced from the International Biathlon Union.

=== Olympic Games ===
1 medal (1 bronze)

| Event | Individual | Relay |
|---|---|---|
| (France) 1968 Grenoble | 18th | 6th |
| (Japan) 1972 Sapporo | 13th | Bronze |

=== World Championships ===
3 medals (1 gold, 2 bronze)

| Event | Individual | Relay |
|---|---|---|
| (Polish People's Republic) 1969 Zakopane | 21st | 5th |
| (Sweden) 1970 Östersund | 4th | Bronze |
| (Finland) 1971 Hämeenlinna | Gold | 10th |
| (United States) 1973 Lake Placid | 13th | Bronze |

*During Olympic seasons competitions are only held for those events not included in the Olympic program.
