= Biathlon World Championships 1967 =

Sports competition in Altenberg, East Germany

- Host city: Altenberg
- Country: East Germany
- Events: 2
- Opening: 17 February 1967
- Closing: 19 February 1967

The 8th Biathlon World Championships were held in 1967 in Altenberg, in the then East Germany.

== Men's results ==
=== 20 km individual ===
Medal	Name	Nation	Penalties	Result
1st place, gold medalist(s)	Viktor Mamatov	URS	4	1:18:34.1
2nd place, silver medalist(s)	Stanisław Szczepaniak	POL	4	1:29:21.3
3rd place, bronze medalist(s)	Jon Istad	NOR	1	1:30:03.7

=== 4 × 7.5 km relay ===
Medal	Name	Nation	Penalties	Result
1st place, gold medalist(s)	Norway Jon Istad; Ragnar Tveiten; Ola Wærhaug; Olav Jordet	NOR		
2nd place, silver medalist(s)	Soviet Union Alexander Tikhonov; Viktor Mamatov; Rinnat Safin; Nikolay Puzanov	URS		
3rd place, bronze medalist(s)	Sweden Olle Petrusson; Tore Eriksson; Holmfrid Olsson; Sture Ohlin	SWE		

== Medal table ==
Place	Nation	1st place, gold medalist(s)	2nd place, silver medalist(s)	3rd place, bronze medalist(s)	Total
1	Soviet Union	1	1	0	2
2	Norway	1	0	1	2
3	Poland	0	1	0	1
4	Sweden	0	0	1	1
