= Serge Legrand =

French biathlete (born 1937)

Personal information
- Nationality: French
- Born: 16 July 1937
- Died: 9 March 2022 (aged 84)

Sport
- Sport: Biathlon

Serge Legrand (16 July 1937 – 9 March 2022) was a French biathlete. He competed in the 4 x 7.5 kilometre relay event at the 1968 Winter Olympics.
