= Heikki Flöjt =

Finnish biathlete

Personal information
- Nationality: Finnish
- Born: 30 November 1943; Kajaani, Finland
- Died: 30 September 2000 (aged 56); Alastaro, Finland

Sport
- Sport: Biathlon

Heikki Flöjt (30 November 1943 – 30 September 2000) was a Finnish biathlete. He competed in the 4 x 7.5 kilometre relay event at the 1968 Winter Olympics.
