= Ragnar Tveiten =

Norwegian biathlete

Personal information
- Full name: Ragnar Tveiten
- Born: 27 November 1938 (age 87) Veggli, Buskerud, Norway
- Height: 1.81 m (5 ft 11 in)

Sport

Professional information
- Sport: Biathlon

Olympic Games
- Teams: 3 (1964, 1968, 1972)
- Medals: 0

World Championships
- Teams: 7 (1965, 1966, 1967, 1969, 1970, 1971, 1973)
- Medals: 6 (2 gold)
Medal record
Men's biathlon
Representing Norway
World Championships
Gold medal – first place	1966 Garmisch-Partenkirchen	4 × 7.5 km relay
Gold medal – first place	1967 Altenberg	4 × 7.5 km relay
Silver medal – second place	1969 Zakopane	4 × 7.5 km relay
Silver medal – second place	1970 Östersund	4 × 7.5 km relay
Silver medal – second place	1971 Hämeenlinna	4 × 7.5 km relay
Silver medal – second place	1973 Lake Placid	4 × 7.5 km relay

Ragnar Tveiten (born 27 November 1938) is a former Norwegian biathlete.

== Personal life ==
Tveiten was born in Veggli on 27 November 1938.

== Career ==
Tveiten placed fourth in the individual biathlon at the 1964 Winter Olympics. He participated on the Norwegian team that won a gold medal in 4 × 7.5 km relay in the 1966 Biathlon World Championships in Garmisch-Partenkirchen. He won a second gold medal in 4 × 7.5 km relay in the 1967 world championships in Altenberg. He received silver medals in 1969, 1970, 1971 and 1973.

== Biathlon results ==
All results are sourced from the International Biathlon Union.

=== Olympic Games ===
Event	Individual	Relay
(Austria) 1964 Innsbruck	4th	—N/a
(France) 1968 Grenoble	26th	—
(Japan) 1972 Sapporo	29th	—

*The relay was added as an event in 1968.

=== World Championships ===
6 medals (2 gold, 4 silver)

Event	Individual	Team (time)	Relay
(Norway) 1965 Elverum	19th	—	—N/a
(West Germany) 1966 Garmisch-Partenkirchen	8th	—N/a	Gold
(East Germany) 1967 Altenberg	7th	—N/a	Gold
(Polish People's Republic) 1969 Zakopane	—	—N/a	Silver
(Sweden) 1970 Östersund	—	—N/a	Silver
(Finland) 1971 Hämeenlinna	12th	—N/a	Silver
(United States) 1973 Lake Placid	28th	—N/a	Silver

*During Olympic seasons competitions are only held for those events not included in the Olympic program.
**The team (time) event was removed in 1965, whilst the relay was added in 1966.
