= Guy Duraffourg =

French biathlete

Personal information
- Nationality: French
- Born: 15 December 1936 (age 88); Les Molunes, France

Sport
- Sport: Biathlon

Guy Duraffourg (born 15 December 1936) is a French biathlete. He competed in the 20 km individual event at the 1968 Winter Olympics.
