= Rinnat Safin =

Soviet biathlete (1940–2014)

Personal information
- Full name: Rinnat Ibragimovich Safin
- Born: 29 August 1940 Bolshiye Yaki, Zelenodolsky, Tatar ASSR, Soviet Union
- Died: 22 October 2014 (aged 74) Leningrad Oblast, Russia
- Height: 1.70 m (5 ft 7 in)

Sport

Professional information
- Sport: Biathlon
- Club: Dinamo Leningrad

Olympic Games
- Teams: 1 (1972)
- Medals: 1 (1 gold)

World Championships
- Teams: 5 (1967, 1969, 1970, 1971, 1973)
- Medals: 6 (4 gold)
Medal record
Men's biathlon
Representing Soviet Union
Olympic Games
Gold medal – first place	1972 Sapporo	4 × 7.5 km relay
World Championships
Gold medal – first place	1969 Zakopane	4 × 7.5 km relay
Gold medal – first place	1970 Östersund	4 × 7.5 km relay
Gold medal – first place	1971 Hämeenlinna	4 × 7.5 km relay
Gold medal – first place	1973 Lake Placid	4 × 7.5 km relay
Silver medal – second place	1967 Altenberg	4 × 7.5 km relay
Silver medal – second place	1969 Zakopane	20 km individual

Rinnat Ibragimovich Safin (Russian: Риннат Ибрагимович Сафин; 29 August 1940 – 22 October 2014) was a Soviet biathlete. At the 1972 Winter Olympics in Sapporo, he won a gold medal with the Soviet relay team.

== Biathlon results ==
All results are sourced from the International Biathlon Union.

=== Olympic Games ===
1 medal (1 gold)

Event	Individual	Relay
(Japan) 1972 Sapporo	19th	Gold

=== World Championships ===
6 medals (4 gold, 2 silver)

Event	Individual	Relay
(East Germany) 1967 Altenberg	4th	Silver
(Polish People's Republic) 1969 Zakopane	Silver	Gold
(Sweden) 1970 Östersund	15th	Gold
(Finland) 1971 Hämeenlinna	5th	Gold
(United States) 1973 Lake Placid	—	Gold

*During Olympic seasons competitions are only held for those events not included in the Olympic program.
