= Jonathan Chaffee =

American biathlete (born 1944)

Personal information
- Born: August 22, 1944 (age 81) Washington, D.C., United States

Sport
- Sport: Biathlon

Jonathan Chaffee (born August 22, 1944) is an American biathlete. He competed in the 20 km individual event at the 1968 Winter Olympics.
