= Mauno Luukkonen =

Finnish biathlete

Personal information
- Nationality: Finnish
- Born: 14 April 1934 (age 90); Impilahti, Finland

Sport
- Sport: Biathlon

Mauno Luukkonen (born 14 April 1934) is a Finnish biathlete. He competed in the 20 km individual event at the 1968 Winter Olympics.
