= Biathlon World Championships 1970 =

Sports competition in Östersund, Sweden

- Host city: Östersund
- Country: Sweden
- Events: 2
- Opening: 19 February 1970
- Closing: 21 February 1970
- Main venue: Östersund Ski Stadium

The 10th Biathlon World Championships were held in Östersund, Sweden in February 1970.

== Men's results ==
=== 20 km individual ===
Medal	Name	Nation	Penalties	Result
1st place, gold medalist(s)	Alexander Tikhonov	URS	5	1:22:46.2
2nd place, silver medalist(s)	Tor Svendsberget	NOR	3	1:22:49.0
3rd place, bronze medalist(s)	Viktor Mamatov	URS	5	1:24:00.7

=== 4 × 7.5 km relay ===
Medal	Name	Nation	Penalties	Result
1st place, gold medalist(s)	Soviet Union; Alexander Tikhonov; Viktor Mamatov; Rinnat Safin; Alexander Ushakov	URS		
2nd place, silver medalist(s)	Norway; Tor Svendsberget; Ragnar Tveiten; Magnar Solberg; Esten Gjelten	NOR		
3rd place, bronze medalist(s)	East Germany; Hans-Gert Jahn; Hansjörg Knauthe; Dieter Speer; Horst Koschka	GDR		

== Medal table ==
Place	Nation	1st place, gold medalist(s)	2nd place, silver medalist(s)	3rd place, bronze medalist(s)	Total
1	Soviet Union	2	0	1	3
2	Norway	0	2	0	2
3	East Germany	0	0	1	1
