= James Boyde =

Canadian biathlete

James Boyde (born 11 April 1943) is a Canadian former biathlete who competed in the 1968 Winter Olympics.
