= Dave Bodington =

British speed skater

Personal information
- Full name: David George Bodington
- Nationality: British
- Born: 30 July 1947 (age 77); Birmingham, England
- Height: 172 cm (5 ft 8 in)

Sport
- Sport: Speed skating

David George "Dave" Bodington (born 30 July 1947) is a British speed skater. He competed in two events at the 1968 Winter Olympics.
