= Biathlon World Championships 1965 =

Sports competition in Elverum, Norway

- Host city: Elverum
- Country: Norway
- Events: 2
- Opening: 18 February 1965
- Closing: 20 February 1965

The 6th Biathlon World Championships were held in 1965 in Elverum, Norway. The men's 20 km individual and team events were the only official competitions. In these championships, an unofficial men's 4 × 7.5 km relay was also held. It was a success, and replaced the team competition as an official event in 1966.

== Men's results ==
=== 20 km individual ===
Medal	Name	Nation	Penalties	Result	Behind
1st place, gold medalist(s)	Olav Jordet	NOR	1	1:23:34.9	
2nd place, silver medalist(s)	Nikolay Puzanov	URS	1	1:23:57.0	22.1
3rd place, bronze medalist(s)	Antti Tyrväinen	FIN	0	1:23:57.6	22.7
4	Ola Wærhaug	NOR	2	1:24:59.0	1:24.1
5	Heinz Kluge	GDR	2	1:25:45.0	2:10.1
6	Józef Gąsienica-Sobczak	POL	0	1:27:05.9	3:31.0

Each shot missing the target gave a penalty of 2 minutes.

=== 20 km team ===
Medal	Name	Nation	Penalties	Result	Behind
1st place, gold medalist(s)	Norway	NOR	6	4:18:00.9	
2nd place, silver medalist(s)	Soviet Union	URS	8	4:20:49.6	2:48.7
3rd place, bronze medalist(s)	Poland	POL	5	4:25:12.9	7:12.0
4	East Germany	GDR	?	4:28:16.4	10:15.5
5	Finland	FIN	?	4:28:24.1	10:23.2
6	Sweden	SWE	5	4:28:31.0	10:30.1

The times of the top 3 athletes from each nation in the individual race were added together.

=== 4 × 7.5 km relay (unofficial) ===
Medal	Name	Nation	Penalties	Result	Behind
1st place, gold medalist(s)	Norway	NOR	5	2:02:34	
2nd place, silver medalist(s)	Sweden	SWE	7	2:04:32	1:58
3rd place, bronze medalist(s)	Soviet Union	URS	4	2:05:46	3:12
4	East Germany	GDR	?	2:06:33	3:59
5	Finland	FIN	?	2:11:00	8:26
6	Romania	ROU	?	2:12:03	9:29

== Medal table (official events) ==
Place	Nation	1st place, gold medalist(s)	2nd place, silver medalist(s)	3rd place, bronze medalist(s)	Total
1	Norway	2	0	0	2
2	Soviet Union	0	2	0	2
3	Finland	0	0	1	1
3	Poland	0	0	1	1
