= Olav Jordet =

Norwegian biathlete (born 1939)

Personal information
- Full name: Olav Jordet
- Born: 27 December 1939 (age 86) Tolga, Hedmark, Norway
- Height: 1.76 m (5 ft 9 in)

Sport

Professional information
- Sport: Biathlon
- Club: Vingrom IL

Olympic Games
- Teams: 2 (1964, 1968)
- Medals: 2 (0 gold)

World Championships
- Teams: 6 (1961, 1962, 1963, 1965, 1966, 1967)
- Medals: 6 (4 gold)
Medal record
Men's biathlon
Representing Norway
Olympic Games
Silver medal – second place	1968 Grenoble	4 × 7.5 km relay
Bronze medal – third place	1964 Innsbruck	20 km individual
World Championships
Gold medal – first place	1965 Elverum	20 km individual
Gold medal – first place	1965 Elverum	Team event
Gold medal – first place	1966 Garmisch-Partenkirchen	4 × 7.5 km relay
Gold medal – first place	1967 Altenberg	4 × 7.5 km relay
Bronze medal – third place	1962 Hämeenlinna	Team event
Bronze medal – third place	1963 Seefeld	Team event

Olav Jordet (born 27 December 1939) is a former Norwegian biathlete who was born in Tolga. He became Norway's first individual biathlon world champion in 1965, has world championship relay gold medals in 1966 and 1967. He won a bronze medal in the 20 km at the 1964 Olympics in Innsbruck, and was a part of the Norwegian relay team that won a silver medal in Grenoble 1968. He has many Norwegian titles in biathlon and skiing area shooting.

Olav Jordet represented Vingelen Skytterlag. He was awarded Morgenbladets Gullmedalje in 1965.

== Biathlon results ==
All results are sourced from the International Biathlon Union.

=== Olympic Games ===
2 medals (1 silver, 1 bronze)

Event	Individual	Relay
(Austria) 1964 Innsbruck	Bronze	—N/a
(France) 1968 Grenoble	—	Silver

*The relay was added as an event in 1968.

=== World Championships ===
6 medals (4 gold, 2 bronze)

Event	Individual	Team (time)	Relay
(Sweden) 1961 Umeå	15th	4th	—N/a
(Finland) 1962 Hämeenlinna	10th	Bronze	—N/a
(Austria) 1963 Seefeld	10th	Bronze	—N/a
(Norway) 1965 Elverum	Gold	Gold	—N/a
(West Germany) 1966 Garmisch-Partenkirchen	16th	—N/a	Gold
(East Germany) 1967 Altenberg	—	—N/a	Gold

*During Olympic seasons competitions are only held for those events not included in the Olympic program.
**The team (time) event was removed in 1965, whilst the relay was added in 1966.
