= Peter Tancock =

British skier (born 1940)

Personal information
- Nationality: British
- Born: 22 July 1940 (age 84)

Sport
- Sport: Biathlon

Peter Tancock (born 22 July 1940) is a British skier. He competed in the 4 x 7.5 kilometre relay event at the 1968 Winter Olympics.
