= Geoff Stockdale =

British speed skater

Personal information
- Full name: Geoffrey Robert Stockdale
- Nationality: British
- Born: 21 March 1944 (age 80); Nottingham, England

Sport
- Sport: Speed skating

Geoffrey Robert "Geoff" Stockdale (born 21 March 1944) is a British speed skater. He competed in two events at the 1968 Winter Olympics.
