= Méaudre =

Commune in Isère, France

- Part of Autrans-Méaudre-en-Vercors
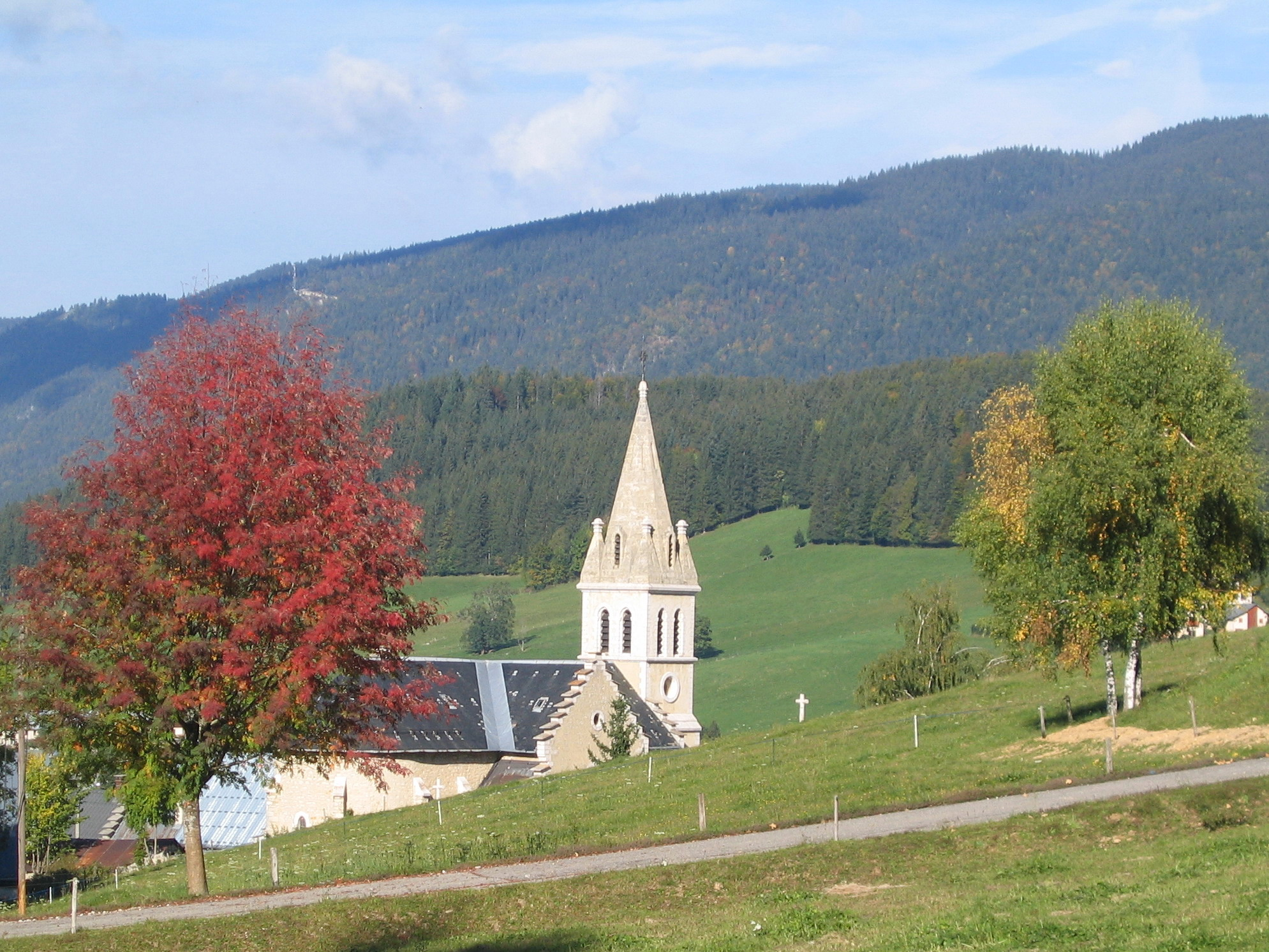
- Location of Méaudre
- Location within France Location within Auvergne-Rhône-Alpes
- Coordinates: 45°07′40″N 5°31′40″E
- Country: France
- Region: Auvergne-Rhône-Alpes
- Department: Isère
- Arrondissement: Grenoble
- Canton: Fontaine-Vercors
- Commune: Autrans-Méaudre-en-Vercors
- Area^{1}: 33.87 km^{2} (13.08 sq mi)
- Highest elevation: 1,625 m (5,331 ft)
- Lowest elevation: 940 m (3,080 ft)
- Population (2022): 1,478
  - Density: 43.64/km^{2} (113.0/sq mi)
- Time zone: UTC+01:00 (CET)
  - Summer (DST): UTC+02:00 (CEST)
- Postal code: 38112
- ^{1} French Land Register data, which excludes lakes, ponds, glaciers > 1 km^{2} (0.386 sq mi or 247 acres) and river estuaries.

Méaudre (French pronunciation: [meodʁ]) is a former commune in the Isère department in southeastern France. On 1 January 2016, it was merged into the new commune of Autrans-Méaudre-en-Vercors.

It is located in the valley of the Vercors with ski resorts.

== Population ==
Historical population

Year	Pop.	±% p.a.
1793	906	—
1821	869	−0.15%
1846	1,200	+1.30%
1872	978	−0.78%
1901	838	−0.53%
1926	646	−1.04%
1946	606	−0.32%
1962	549	−0.62%

Year	Pop.	±% p.a.
1968	572	+0.69%
1975	588	+0.39%
1982	667	+1.82%
1990	840	+2.92%
1999	1,039	+2.39%
2006	1,171	+1.72%
2022	1,478	+1.47%

Source: EHESS and INSEE

== Twin towns ==
Méaudre is twinned with:

- Locmaria, France

== See also ==
- Communes of the Isère department
- Parc naturel régional du Vercors
