= Vladimir Gundartsev =

Soviet biathlete (1944–2014)

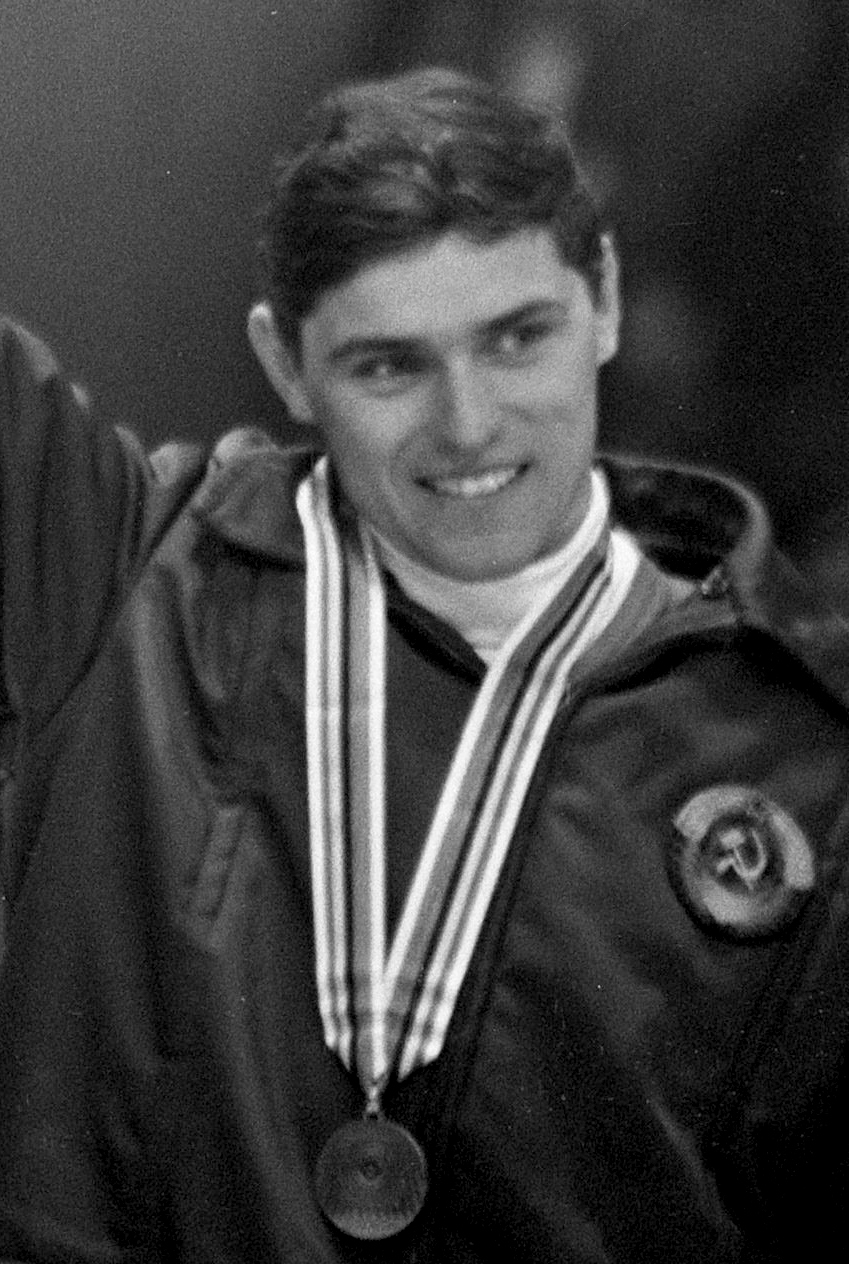
- Gundartsev at the 1968 Olympics

Personal information
- Full name: Vladimir Ilyich Gundartsev
- Born: 13 December 1944 Satka, Chelyabinsk Oblast, RSFSR, Soviet Union
- Died: 25 November 2014 (aged 69) Moscow, Russia
- Height: 1.78 m (5 ft 10 in)

Sport

Professional information
- Sport: Biathlon
- Club: Dynamo Moscow

Olympic Games
- Teams: 1 (1968)
- Medals: 2 (1 gold)

World Championships
- Teams: 2 (1966, 1969)
- Medals: 2 (1 gold)
Medal record
Men's biathlon
Representing Soviet Union
Olympic Games
Gold medal – first place	1968 Grenoble	4 × 7.5 km
Bronze medal – third place	1968 Grenoble	20 km
World Championships
Gold medal – first place	1969 Zakopane	4 × 7.5 km
Bronze medal – third place	1966 Garmisch-Partenkirchen	20 km

Vladimir Ilyich Gundartsev (Russian: Влади́мир Ильи́ч Гундарцев; 13 December 1944 – 25 November 2014) was a Soviet biathlete.

== Olympics career ==
At the 1968 Winter Olympics in Grenoble, he won a gold medal with the Soviet relay team, and an individual bronze medal.

== Biathlon results ==
All results are sourced from the International Biathlon Union.

=== Olympic Games ===
2 medals (1 gold, 1 bronze)

Event	Individual	Relay
(France) 1968 Grenoble	Bronze	Gold

=== World Championships ===
2 medals (1 gold, 1 bronze)

Event	Individual	Relay
(West Germany) 1966 Garmisch-Partenkirchen	Bronze	4th
(Polish People's Republic) 1969 Zakopane	—	Gold

*During Olympic seasons competitions are only held for those events not included in the Olympic program.
