= John Tipper (speed skater) =

British speed skater

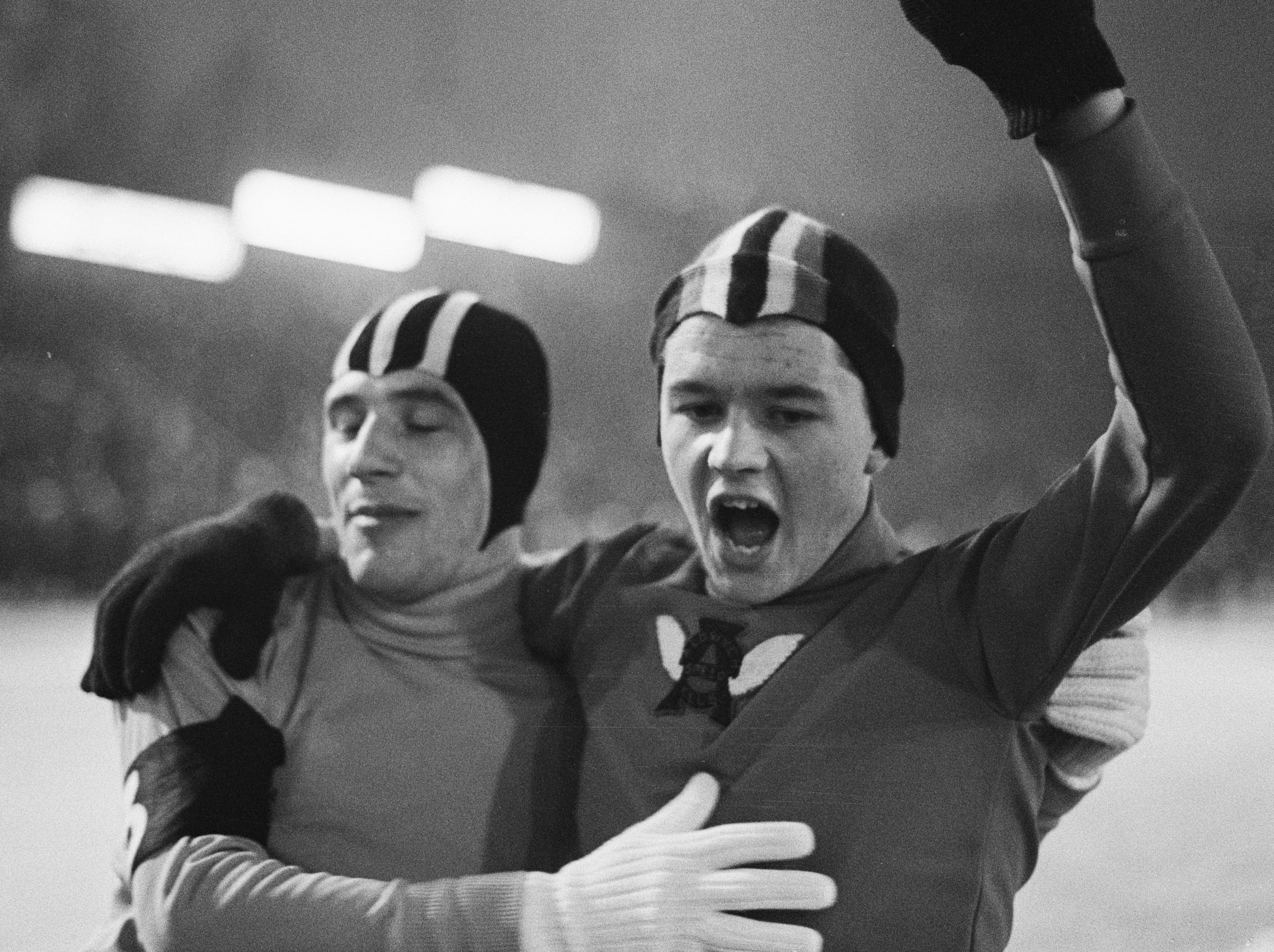
- Kees Verkerk and John Tipper (right) after skating 5000 m at the 1967 World Championships

Personal information
- Full name: Anthony John Tipper
- Born: 16 September 1944 (age 81) Buckingham, England
- Height: 1.75 m (5 ft 9 in)
- Weight: 69 kg (152 lb)

Sport
- Sport: Speed skating

Anthony John Tipper (born 16 September 1944) is a retired English speed skater. He competed at the 1968 Winter Olympics in the 500 m and 1500 m events and finished in 19th and 28th place, respectively.

== Personal bests ==
- 500 m – 40.53 (1972)
- 1000 m – 1:22.8 (1972)
- 1500 m – 2:08.4 (1970)
- 5000 m – 8:09.1 (1970)
