= Hans-Gert Jahn =

German biathlete

Personal information
- Nationality: German
- Born: 21 August 1945 (age 79); Dorfchemnitz, Germany

Sport
- Sport: Biathlon

Hans-Gert Jahn (born 21 August 1945) is a German biathlete. He competed in the 4 x 7.5 kilometre relay event at the 1968 Winter Olympics.
