= Valery Kaplan =

Russian speed skater

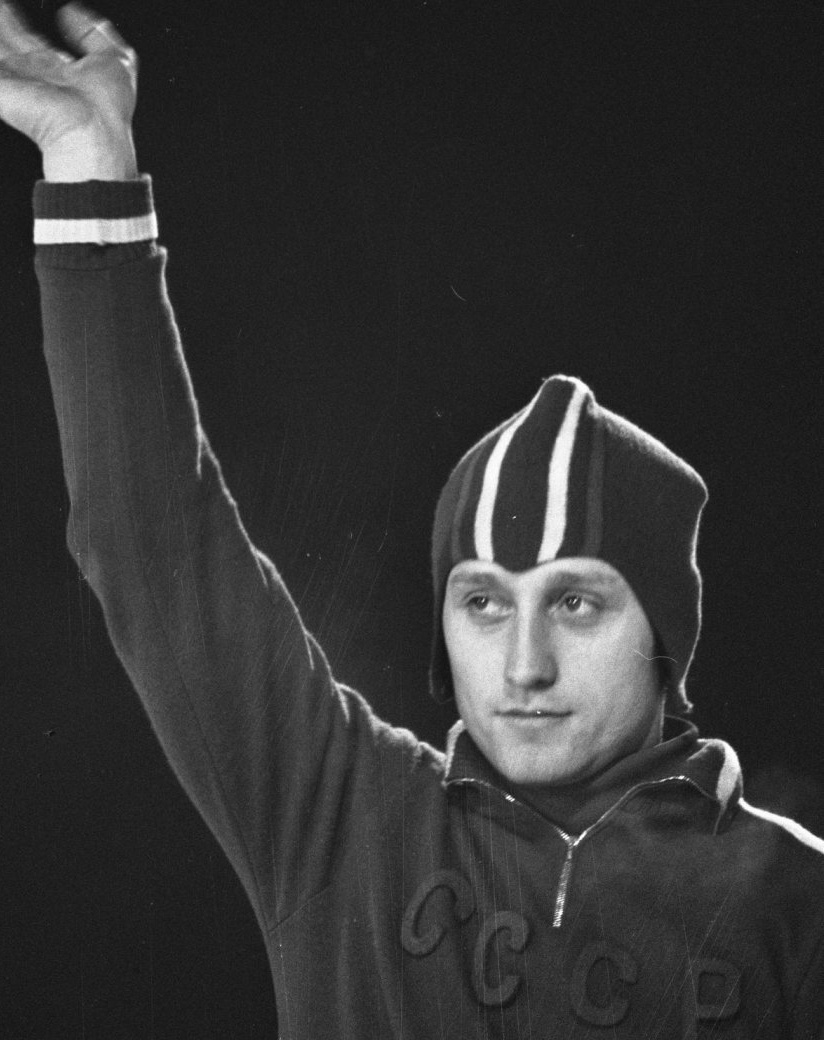
- Valery Kaplan in 1967

Personal information
- Born: 26 February 1943 (age 83) Moscow, Russian SFSR, Soviet Union
- Height: 1.74 m (5 ft 9 in)
- Weight: 73 kg (161 lb)

Sport
- Sport: Speed skating
- Club: CSKA
Medal record
Representing the Soviet Union
European Speed Skating Championships
Bronze medal – third place	1966 Deventer	All-round
Silver medal – second place	1967 Lahti	All-round

Valery Kaplan (Russian: Валерий Каплан; born 26 February 1943) is a retired Russian speed skater who won a bronze and a silver medal at the European championships in 1966 and 1967, respectively. He competed at the 1968 Winter Olympics in 500 m and 1,500 m and finished in 21st and 12th place, respectively.

His personal bests were

- 500 m – 39.8 (1968)
- 1000 m – 1:21.9 (1970)
- 1500 m – 2:04.3 (1968)
- 5000 m – 7:37.6 (1968)
- 10000 m – 16:07.5 (1966)
