= Knowles McGill =

Canadian biathlete

Knowles McGill (born 21 February 1942) is a Canadian former biathlete who competed in the 1968 Winter Olympics.
