= Yrjö Salpakari =

Finnish biathlete

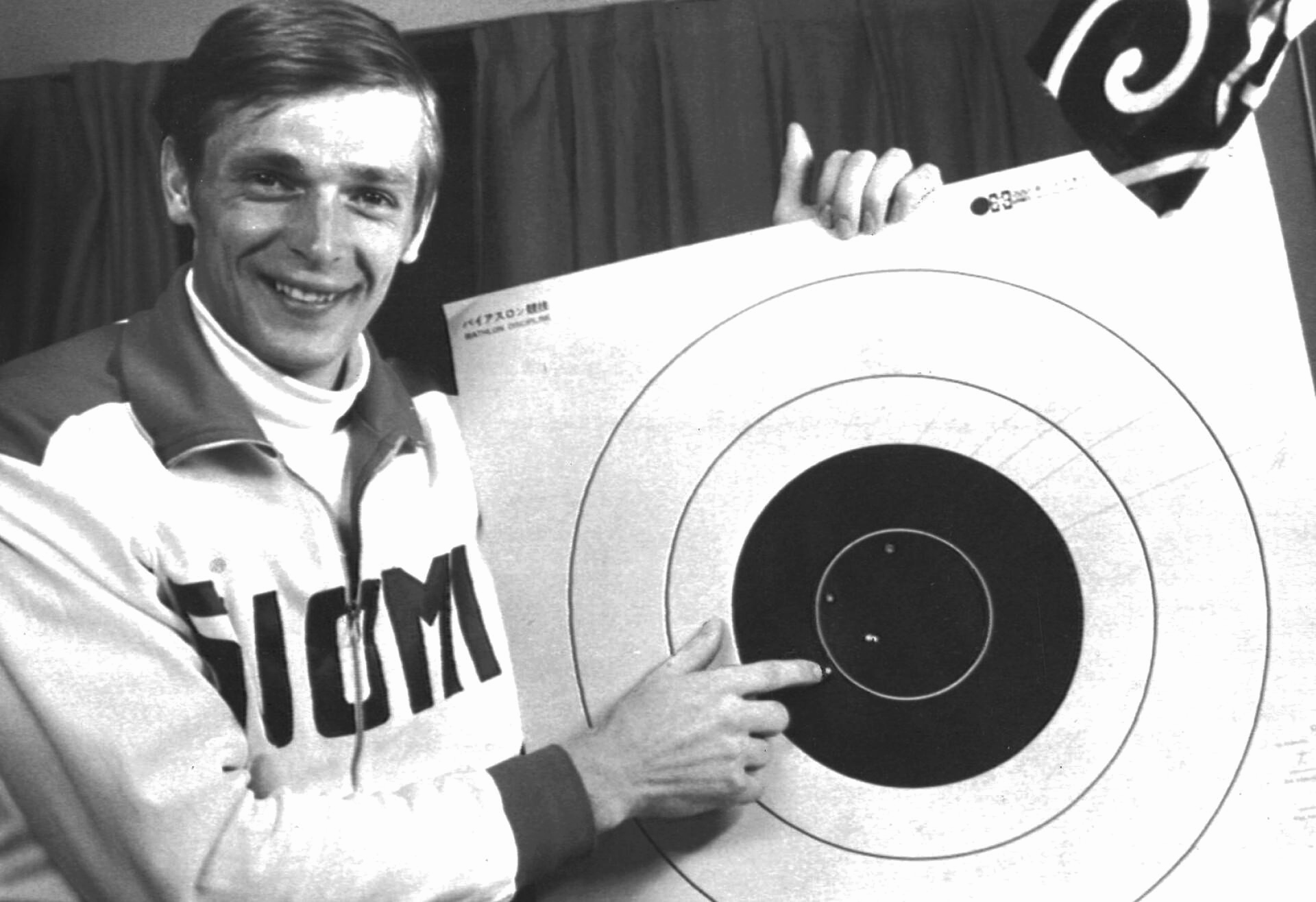
- Yrjö Salpakari at the 1972 Winter Olympics.

Personal information
- Full name: Yrjö Sakari Salpakari
- Nationality: Finnish
- Born: 25 September 1945 (age 79); Lapua, Finland

Sport
- Sport: Biathlon

Yrjö Salpakari (born 25 September 1945) is a Finnish biathlete. He competed at the 1968 Winter Olympics and the 1972 Winter Olympics.
