= Ian Todd (footballer) =

Australian rules footballer (born 1961)

Personal information
- Full name: Ian Todd
- Born: 11 September 1961 (age 65)
- Original team: Murrumbeena Districts
- Height: 191 cm (6 ft 3 in)
- Weight: 87 kg (192 lb)

Playing career^{1}
Years	Club	Games (Goals)
1981	Melbourne	6 (1)
- ^{1} Playing statistics correct to the end of 1981.

Ian Todd (born 11 September 1961) is a former Australian rules footballer who played with Melbourne in the Victorian Football League (VFL).
