= Autrans =

Commune in Isère, France

- Part of Autrans-Méaudre-en-Vercors
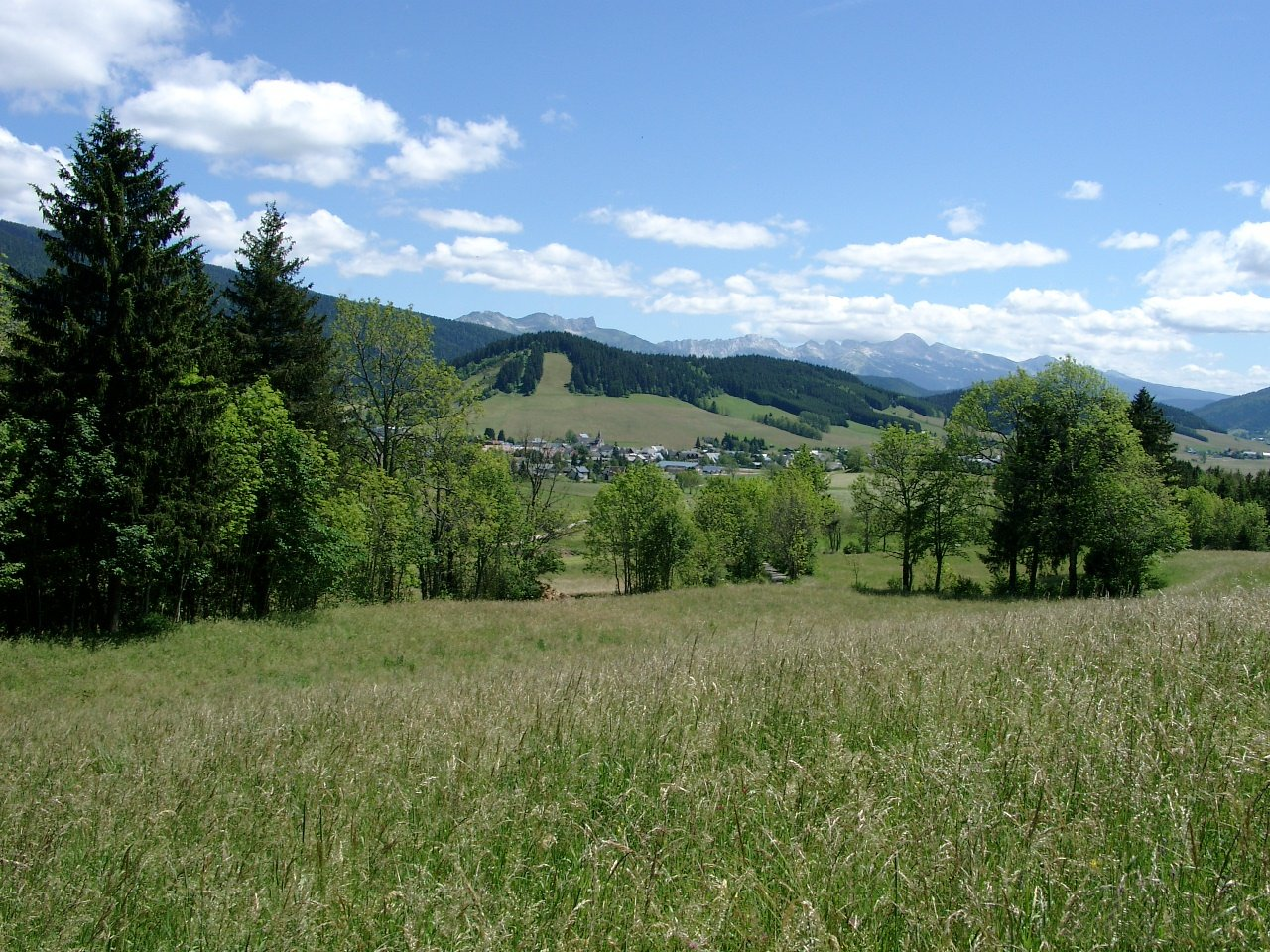

- Coat of arms
- Location of Autrans
- Location within France Location within Auvergne-Rhône-Alpes
- Coordinates: 45°10′34″N 5°32′31″E
- Country: France
- Region: Auvergne-Rhône-Alpes
- Department: Isère
- Arrondissement: Grenoble
- Canton: Fontaine-Vercors
- Commune: Autrans-Méaudre-en-Vercors
- Area^{1}: 44 km^{2} (17 sq mi)
- Highest elevation: 1,711 m (5,614 ft)
- Lowest elevation: 1,005 m (3,297 ft)
- Population (2022): 1,527
  - Density: 35/km^{2} (90/sq mi)
- Time zone: UTC+01:00 (CET)
  - Summer (DST): UTC+02:00 (CEST)
- Postal code: 38880
- ^{1} French Land Register data, which excludes lakes, ponds, glaciers > 1 km^{2} (0.386 sq mi or 247 acres) and river estuaries.

Autrans (French pronunciation: [otʁɑ̃]) is a former commune in the Isère department in the Rhône-Alpes region of south-eastern France. On 1 January 2016, it was merged into the new commune of Autrans-Méaudre-en-Vercors.

At the 1968 Winter Olympics in Grenoble, it hosted the biathlon, cross-country skiing, Nordic combined, and the ski jumping normal hill events.

The commune has been awarded one flower by the National Council of Towns and Villages in Bloom in the Competition of cities and villages in Bloom.

== Geography ==
Autrans is located on the Vercors Plateau in the Vercors Regional Natural Park some 10 km west of Grenoble and 11 km east of Vinay. Access to the commune is solely by the D106C which branches north from the D106 and passes in a loop through the village then back south to Méaudre. A local road goes north from the village along to the valley to the ski fields in the north of the commune. There is farmland in the valley but the slopes of the surrounding mountains are rugged and heavily forested.

The Meaudret rises in the north of the commune and flows south down the valley through the village and continues south to join the Bourne at Les Jarrands.

Bus line 5120 connects Lans-en-Vercors and Villard-de-Lans stops in Autrans village and Méaudre (the square). There is a shuttle bus in winter from the village to the ski fields.

=== Climate ===
Climate data for Autrans (1981–2010 averages, 1956–2022 extremes): elevation 1069m
Month	Jan	Feb	Mar	Apr	May	Jun	Jul	Aug	Sep	Oct	Nov	Dec	Year
Record high °C (°F)	17.1 (62.8)	19.0 (66.2)	21.0 (69.8)	24.9 (76.8)	29.9 (85.8)	31.3 (88.3)	34.2 (93.6)	34.0 (93.2)	30.6 (87.1)	25.2 (77.4)	22.5 (72.5)	17.0 (62.6)	34.2 (93.6)
Mean daily maximum °C (°F)	2.8 (37.0)	3.8 (38.8)	6.7 (44.1)	9.7 (49.5)	14.7 (58.5)	18.4 (65.1)	21.7 (71.1)	21.5 (70.7)	17.5 (63.5)	13.8 (56.8)	7.2 (45.0)	3.5 (38.3)	11.8 (53.2)
Daily mean °C (°F)	−1.5 (29.3)	−0.9 (30.4)	1.9 (35.4)	4.9 (40.8)	9.5 (49.1)	12.9 (55.2)	15.7 (60.3)	15.4 (59.7)	12.0 (53.6)	8.6 (47.5)	2.9 (37.2)	−0.4 (31.3)	6.8 (44.2)
Mean daily minimum °C (°F)	−5.8 (21.6)	−5.7 (21.7)	−2.9 (26.8)	0.0 (32.0)	4.3 (39.7)	7.4 (45.3)	9.7 (49.5)	9.4 (48.9)	6.4 (43.5)	3.5 (38.3)	−1.4 (29.5)	−4.4 (24.1)	1.7 (35.1)
Record low °C (°F)	−25.5 (−13.9)	−26.0 (−14.8)	−24.0 (−11.2)	−15.0 (5.0)	−8.0 (17.6)	−4.0 (24.8)	−0.3 (31.5)	−4.2 (24.4)	−5.0 (23.0)	−12.0 (10.4)	−18.0 (−0.4)	−22.0 (−7.6)	−26.0 (−14.8)
Average precipitation mm (inches)	119.0 (4.69)	100.4 (3.95)	110.4 (4.35)	125.6 (4.94)	142.9 (5.63)	116.1 (4.57)	112.3 (4.42)	116.4 (4.58)	137.4 (5.41)	130.8 (5.15)	130.7 (5.15)	120.6 (4.75)	1,462.6 (57.59)
Source: Meteociel

=== Hiking trails ===
There are two main hiking trails crossing the commune: municipality is crossed by

- the GR 9;
- the GR footpath: Tour of the Four Mountains.

=== Places and hamlets ===
- L'Achard
- Les Ronins
- Les Prud'hommes
- Villeneuve
- Eybertière
- Le Bourg du-dessus
- Les Eperouses
- Le Bourg du dessous
- Le Bouchet
- Le Truc
- Andrevière
- Les Gonnets
- Les Tranchants
- Les Vernes
- Les Gaillards
- Le Mollaret
- Le Tonkin
- Les Franques
- Payenat
- Écharlière

== Toponymy ==
The name Autrans is derived from the name of a village called Lans (the oldest village on the plateau) and originated from oultre-Lans meaning "beyond the village of Lans" which, over the course of time, was transformed into Autrans.

== History ==
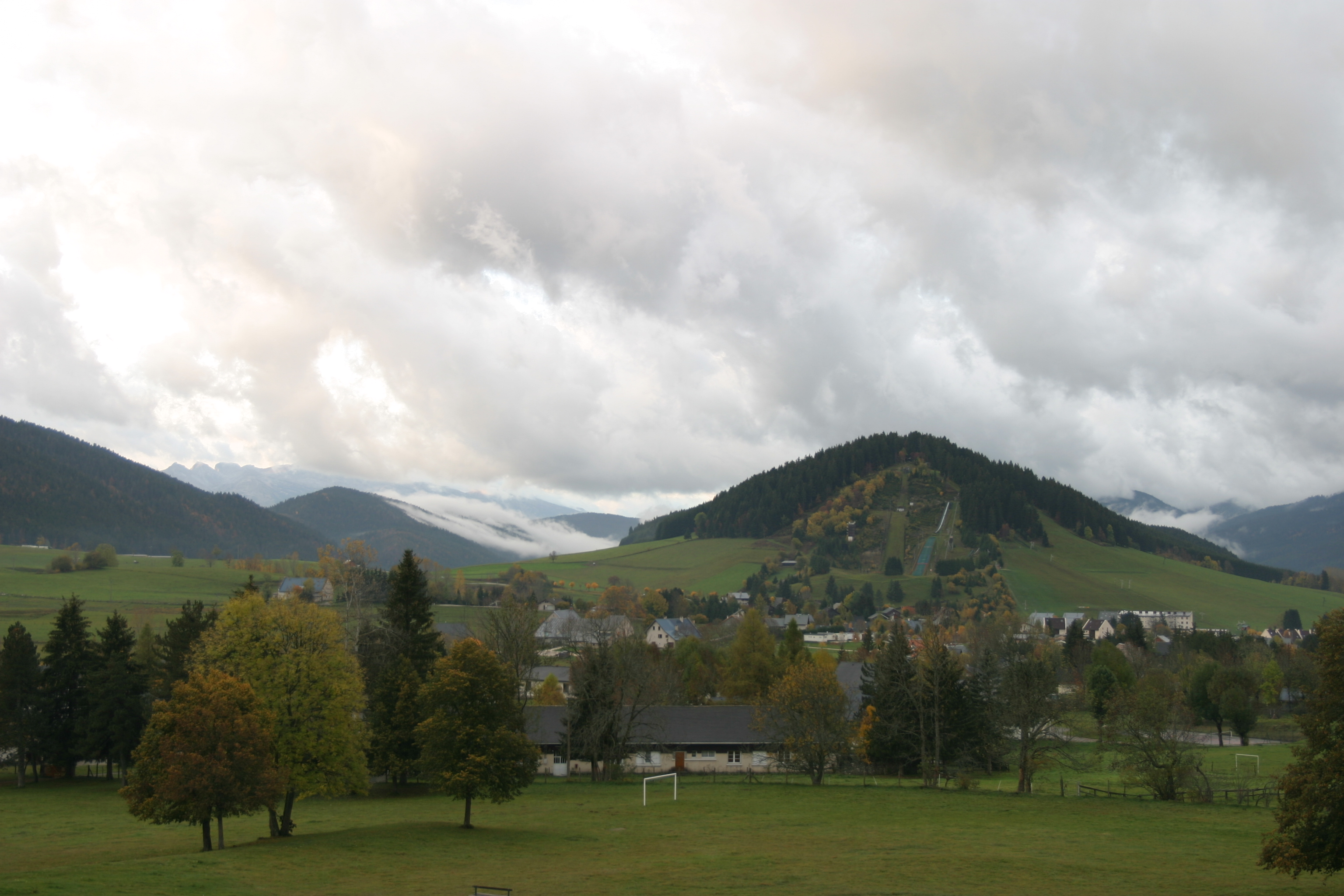
The Ski-jumps seen from afar.

- The 1968 Olympics in Grenoble (which were the first to be aired on TV) included cross-country skiing, biathlon, ski-jumping (90m ski-jump) and combined Nordic skiing (jumping and cross-country). For many French people the TV images of Nordic skiing at Autrans were a revelation. This would mark the beginning of the development of skiing in France and throughout Europe;
- The Grenoble Olympic Winter Games 1968 ski-jumps were part of a long local tradition of ski jumping (first ski competition in 1911). Today jumps of 90 m, 56 m, and 20 m are equipped to be used in winter and in summer for many national and international competitions. There is a viewing platform at the top of the 90 m ramp.

=== Heraldry ===
Arms of Autrans	Blazon: Party per bend sinister, at 1 barry of 10 Azure and Argent debruised by a lion of Gules armed, langued, and crowned in of Or; at 2 Azure a crystal of snow Argent.

== Administration ==
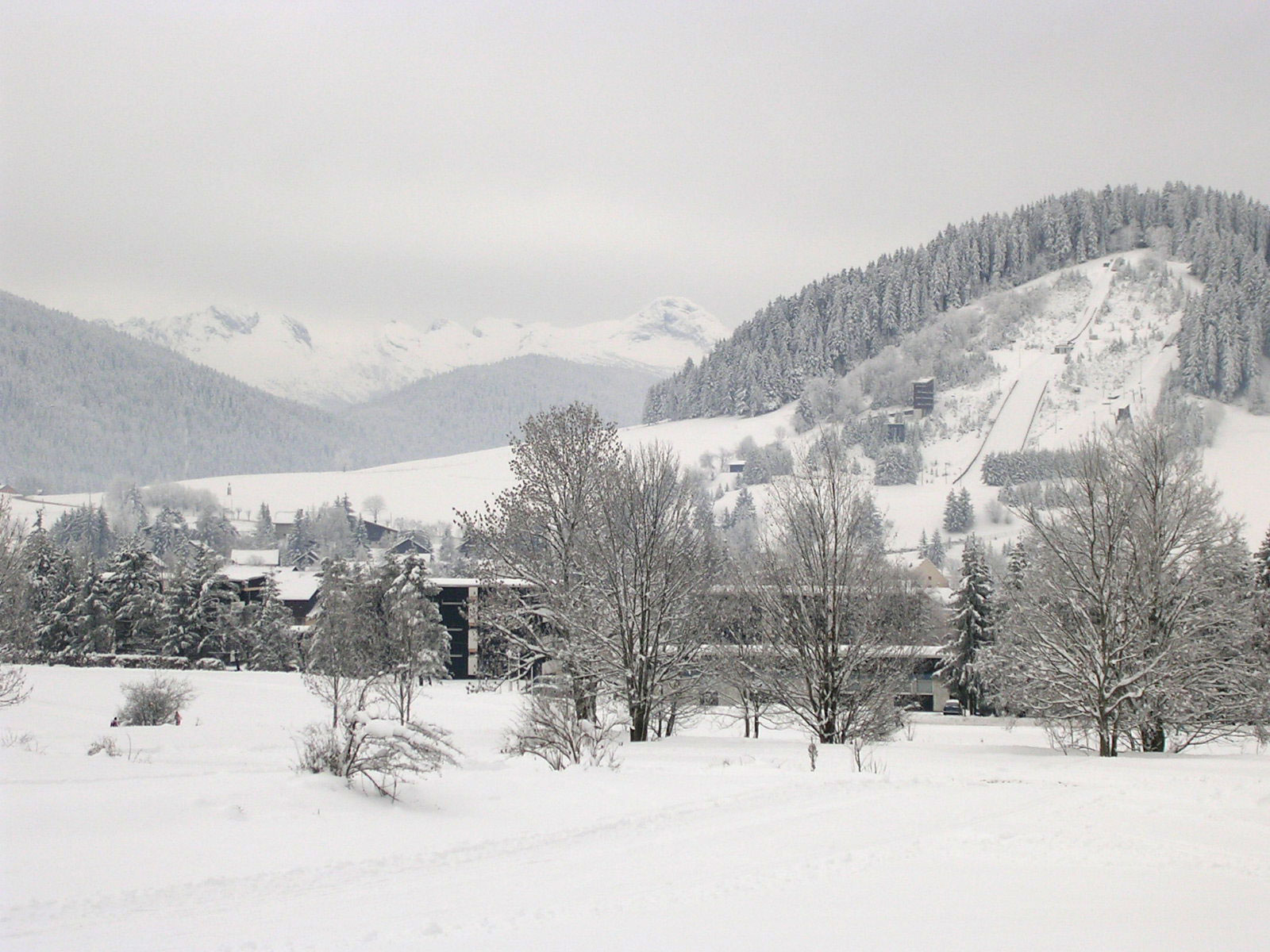
The ski-jump in winter

List of Successive Mayors

From	To	Name	Party	Position
1977	1983	Gilbert Michel		
1983	2008	Jean Faure	UMP	Senator (1983-2011)
2008	2014	Gabriel Tatin	DVG	1st VP of Parc
2014	2016	Thierry Gamot	UMP	

=== Public services ===
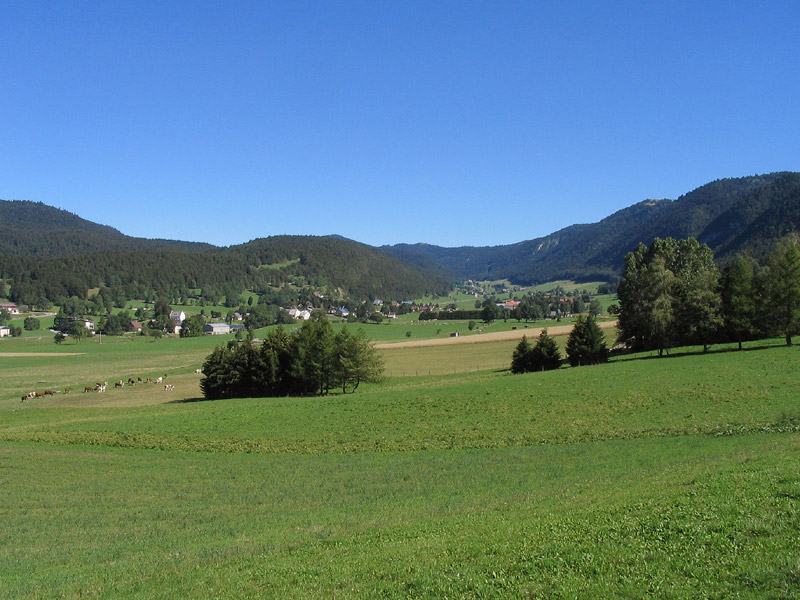
Autrans in summer

The commune has the following services:

- A Tourist office;
- A Fire Station;
- An Isere General Council road maintenance depot

=== Twinning ===
Autrans has twinning associations with:

- Lillehammer (Norway) since 1994.

== Demography ==
The inhabitants of the commune are known as Autranais or Autranaises in French.

Historical population

Year	Pop.	±% p.a.
1793	1,001	—
1800	1,100	+1.36%
1806	1,103	+0.05%
1821	1,047	−0.35%
1831	1,107	+0.56%
1836	1,117	+0.18%
1841	1,181	+1.12%
1846	1,219	+0.64%
1851	1,290	+1.14%
1856	1,201	−1.42%
1861	1,204	+0.05%
1866	1,173	−0.52%
1872	1,118	−0.80%
1876	1,092	−0.59%
1881	1,071	−0.39%
1886	999	−1.38%
1891	1,000	+0.02%
1896	961	−0.79%

Year	Pop.	±% p.a.
1901	946	−0.31%
1906	926	−0.43%
1911	901	−0.55%
1921	801	−1.17%
1926	808	+0.17%
1931	890	+1.95%
1936	857	−0.75%
1946	1,114	+2.66%
1954	1,359	+2.52%
1962	980	−4.00%
1968	988	+0.14%
1975	1,330	+4.34%
1982	1,370	+0.42%
1990	1,406	+0.32%
1999	1,541	+1.02%
2007	1,672	+1.03%
2012	1,628	−0.53%
2022	1,527	−0.64%

Source: EHESS and INSEE

== Economy ==
=== Winter Sports ===
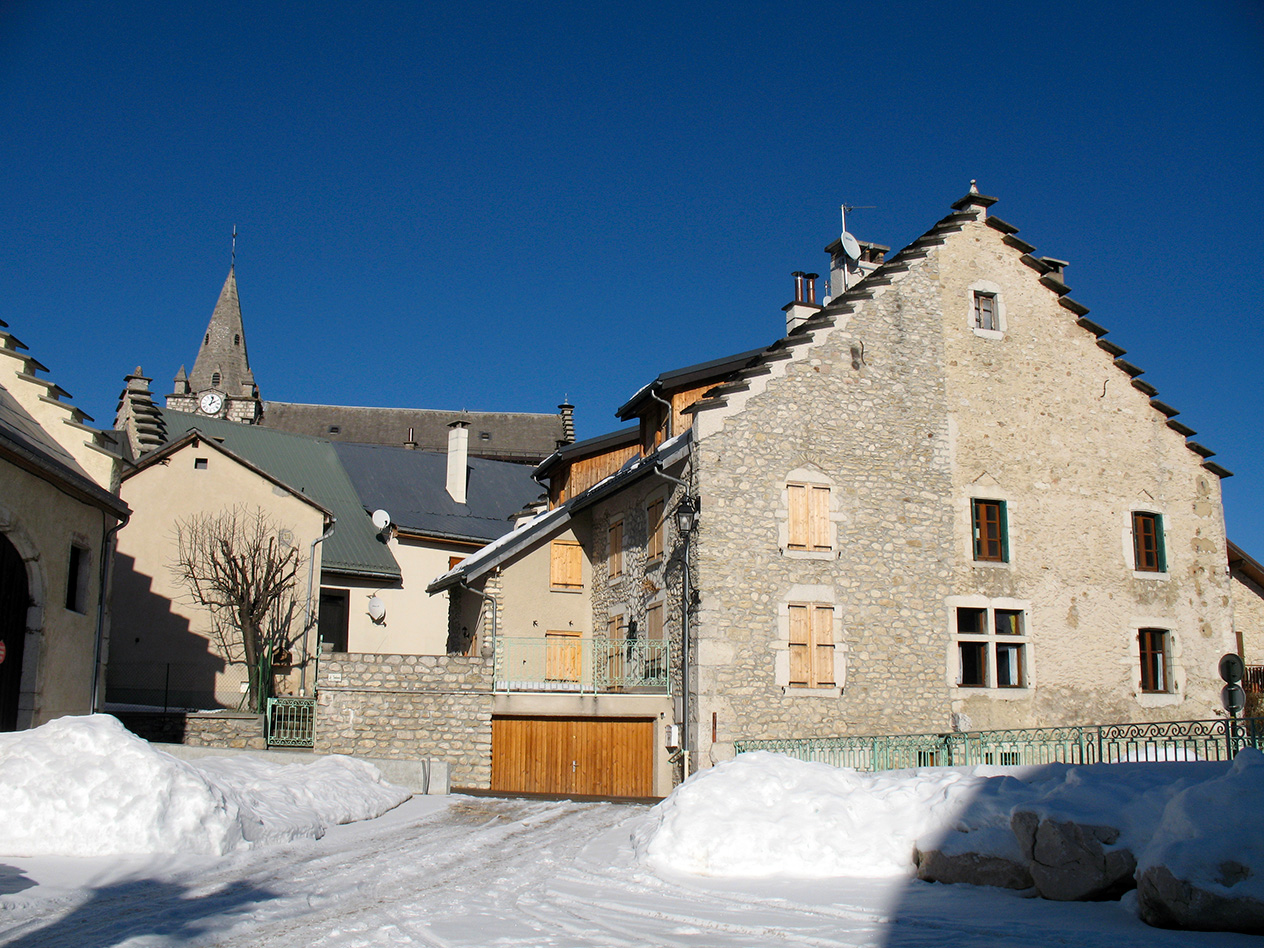
Autrans in winter

- Alpine ski area: a large field of Sure, a small field of Claret, night skiing, beginner park.
- Nordic ski area, cross country skiing, snowshoeing - the French capital of Nordic skiing.
- The economy is mainly based on tourism.

Tourism in the early 21st century focused primarily on the healthy climate and the station hosted many children who had health problems - especially respiratory.

=== Agriculture ===
In the early 1900s there were nearly 130 farms. Today there are 17 farms including 13 dairy farms in Autrans. Milk production is transformed into the Bleu du Vercors-Sassenage AOC in Col Vert, Brique, Saint Marcellin. Autrans also has cattle farms for meat and farm produce and a pigeon farm to serve the best restaurants. Every year on the 1st weekend in May the operation "Take the key to the fields" can visit the farms on the Vercors Plateau and discover their products.

There are also Forestry activities.

== Culture and Heritage ==
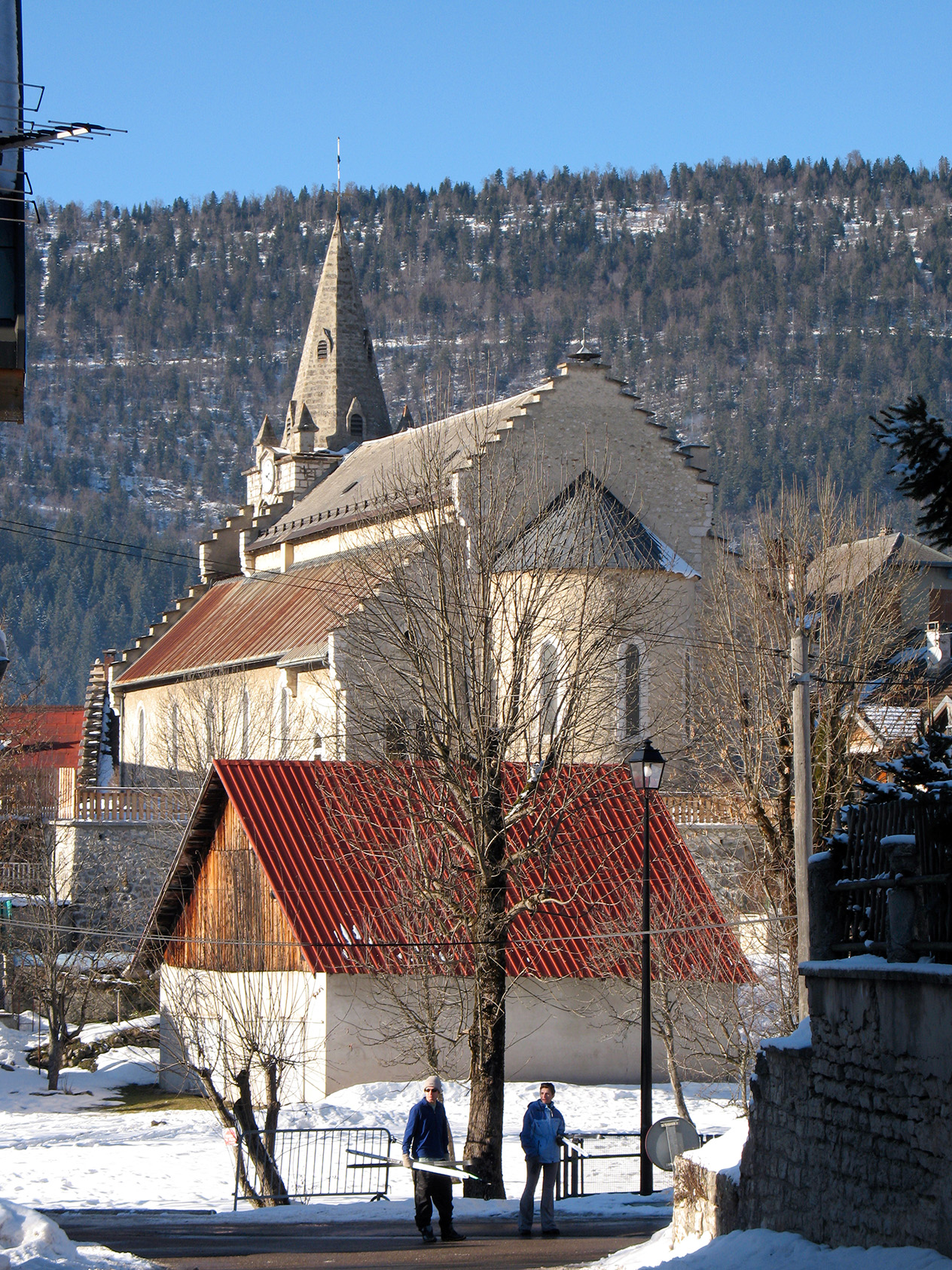
The Romanesque Church

=== Architectural Heritage ===
- A Romanesque church is located on a hill in the centre of the village. Only the bell tower is from the Middle Ages (12th to 13th centuries), its stone spire dates back to the 17th and 18th centuries, the choir and the nave of the building are from 1875.

=== Archaeological Heritage ===
Autrans has three sites: a Motte-and-bailey castle and two fortified houses at Malatan and La Tour hamlets. Of these three sites nothing remains except mounds and that can be seen today in the landscape.

- The Motte du Chateau is located approximately 1 km to the east of Autrans Church on a Moraine. A wattle and daub building existed on the mound in the 11th century.
- Malatan is located approximately 300 m south-east of the Motte du Chateau and is an old fortified house probably dating from the 14th century.
- The Tower is located approximately 200 m to the north of the hamlet of Andrevières and excavations have identified the remains of a round tower probably dating from the 12th century.

=== Underground heritage ===
- The Ture Cave is located near the hamlet of Naves. It is used today for an introduction to caving or the simple discovery of an underground world because it has fairly easy access.

== Local life ==
=== Sports ===
The Gève Domain is located 1,300 m above sea level and has an international reputation. Located to the north of the Massif du Vercors, the snow conditions are exceptional. This area is accessible by car and there are free shuttles to all valid ski pass holders for the Autrans ski resort.

=== Sporting events ===
- The Foulée blanche (White Stride) event has been held every year since 1979 in January. It is a cross-country skiing race attracting nearly 5,000 participants.

=== Cultural Events ===
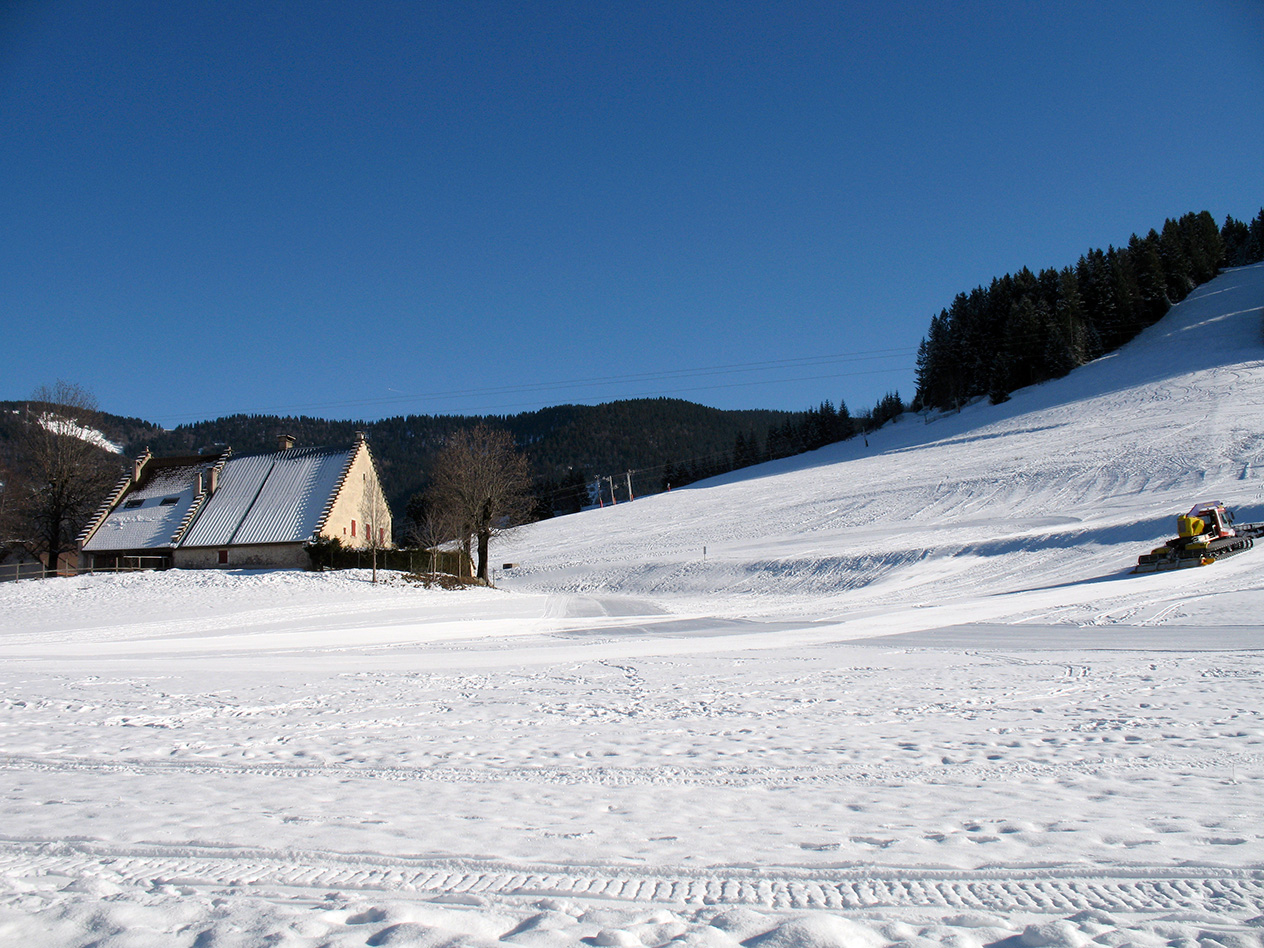
Autrans in the snow during the 2009 Internet meeting

- The Autrans Internet Meeting is an annual event dedicated to the understanding of the future of the Internet. The event started in 1997 and is held every year in January.

== Education ==
The town has a public kindergarten and a public primary school.

== See also ==
- Communes of the Isère department
- Parc naturel régional du Vercors
