= Roger Bean (biathlete) =

British biathlete (born 1945)

Personal information
- Nationality: British
- Born: 18 November 1945 (age 79)

Sport
- Sport: Biathlon

Roger Bean (born 18 November 1945) is a British biathlete. He competed in the 20 km individual event at the 1968 Winter Olympics.
