= Biathlon World Championships 1969 =

Sports competition in Zakopane, Poland

- Host city: Zakopane
- Country: Poland
- Events: 2
- Opening: 27 February 1969
- Closing: 2 March 1969

The 9th Biathlon World Championships were held in 1969 in Zakopane, Poland.

== Men's results ==
=== 20 km individual ===
| Medal | Name | Nation | Penalties | Result |
|---|---|---|---|---|
| 1st place, gold medalist(s) | Alexander Tikhonov | URS | 5 | 1:22:46.2 |
| 2nd place, silver medalist(s) | Rinnat Safin | URS | 3 | 1:22:49.0 |
| 3rd place, bronze medalist(s) | Magnar Solberg | NOR | 5 | 1:24:00.7 |

=== 4 × 7.5 km relay ===
| Medal | Name | Nation | Penalties | Result |
|---|---|---|---|---|
| 1st place, gold medalist(s) | Soviet Union; Alexander Tikhonov; Viktor Mamatov; Rinnat Safin; Vladimir Gundartsev | URS | | |
| 2nd place, silver medalist(s) | Norway; Jon Istad; Ragnar Tveiten; Magnar Solberg; Esten Gjelten | NOR | | |
| 3rd place, bronze medalist(s) | Finland; Kalevi Vähäkylä; Mauri Röppänen; Mauno Peltonen; Esko Marttinen | FIN | | |

== Medal table ==
| Place | Nation | 1st place, gold medalist(s) | 2nd place, silver medalist(s) | 3rd place, bronze medalist(s) | Total |
|---|---|---|---|---|---|
| 1 | Soviet Union | 2 | 1 | 0 | 3 |
| 2 | Norway | 0 | 1 | 1 | 2 |
| 3 | Finland | 0 | 0 | 1 | 1 |
