= Trish Tipper =

British speed skater

Personal information
- Full name: Patricia Kay Tipper
- Nationality: British
- Born: 11 March 1946 (age 80) London, England
- Spouse: Phil Liggett

Sport
- Sport: Speed skating

Patricia Kay "Trish" Tipper (born 11 March 1946) is a British speed skater. She competed in two events at the 1968 Winter Olympics. She married Phil Liggett, a journalist and broadcaster who specializes in cycling.
