= Valery Tarakanov =

Soviet cross-country skier

Medal record

Men's cross-country skiing

World Championships
Gold medal – first place	1970 Vysoké Tatry	4 x 10 km

Valery Tarakanov (Russian: Вале́рий Тарака́нов; born 9 August 1941 in Yaroslavl) is a Soviet/Russian former cross-country skier who competed in the late 1960s and early 1970s. He won the 4x10 km gold at the 1970 FIS Nordic World Ski Championships in Vysoké Tatry. Tarakanov also finished 6th in the 15 km in the same championships. He was on the 4x10 km team that finished fourth at the 1968 Winter Olympics in Grenoble.
