= Tore Eriksson =

Swedish biathlete (1937–2017)

Medal record

Representing Sweden

Men's biathlon

Olympic Games
Bronze medal – third place	1968 Grenoble	4 x 7.5 km relay

World championship
Bronze medal – third place	1966 Garmisch-Partenkirchen	4 x 7.5 km relay
Bronze medal – third place	1967 Altenberg	4 x 7.5 km relay

Tore Eriksson (August 7, 1937 – February 17, 2017) was a Swedish biathlete and Olympic medalist. He was born in Transtrand. He received a bronze medal at the 1968 Winter Olympics in Grenoble. He participated on the bronze teams at the 1966 and at the 1967 Biathlon World Championships.
