= Mikhail Artyukhov =

Soviet Nordic combined skier (born 1943)

Personal information
- Nationality: Soviet
- Born: 15 September 1943 (age 81); Sortavala, Russian SFSR, Soviet Union

Sport
- Sport: Nordic combined

Mikhail Artyukhov (born 15 September 1943) is a Soviet former skier. He competed in the Nordic combined at the 1968 Winter Olympics and the 1972 Winter Olympics.
