= Biathlon World Championships 1966 =

7th edition of the Biathlon World Championships

- Host city: Garmisch-Partenkirchen, Bavaria
- Country: West Germany
- Events: 2
- Opening: 4 February 1966
- Closing: 6 February 1966

The 7th Biathlon World Championships were held in 1966 in Garmisch-Partenkirchen, in the then West Germany. The men's relay event was given official recognition.

== Men's results ==
=== 20 km individual ===
Medal	Name	Nation	Penalties	Result
1st place, gold medalist(s)	Jon Istad	NOR	4	1:38:21.8
2nd place, silver medalist(s)	Józef Gąsienica-Sobczak	POL	4	1:39:53.6
3rd place, bronze medalist(s)	Vladimir Gundartsev	URS	1	1:39:53.6

=== 4 × 7.5 km relay ===
Medal	Name	Nation	Penalties	Result
1st place, gold medalist(s)	Norway Jon Istad; Ragnar Tveiten; Ivar Nordkild; Olav Jordet	NOR		
2nd place, silver medalist(s)	Poland Józef Gąsienica-Sobczak; Stanisław Szczepaniak; Stanisław Łukaszczyk; Józef Rubiś	POL		
3rd place, bronze medalist(s)	Sweden Olle Petrusson; Tore Eriksson; Holmfrid Olsson; Sture Ohlin	SWE		

== Medal table ==
Place	Nation	1st place, gold medalist(s)	2nd place, silver medalist(s)	3rd place, bronze medalist(s)	Total
1	Norway	2	0	0	2
2	Poland	0	2	0	2
3	Soviet Union	0	0	1	1
3	Sweden	0	0	1	1
