= Magnar Solberg =

Norwegian biathlete (born 1937)

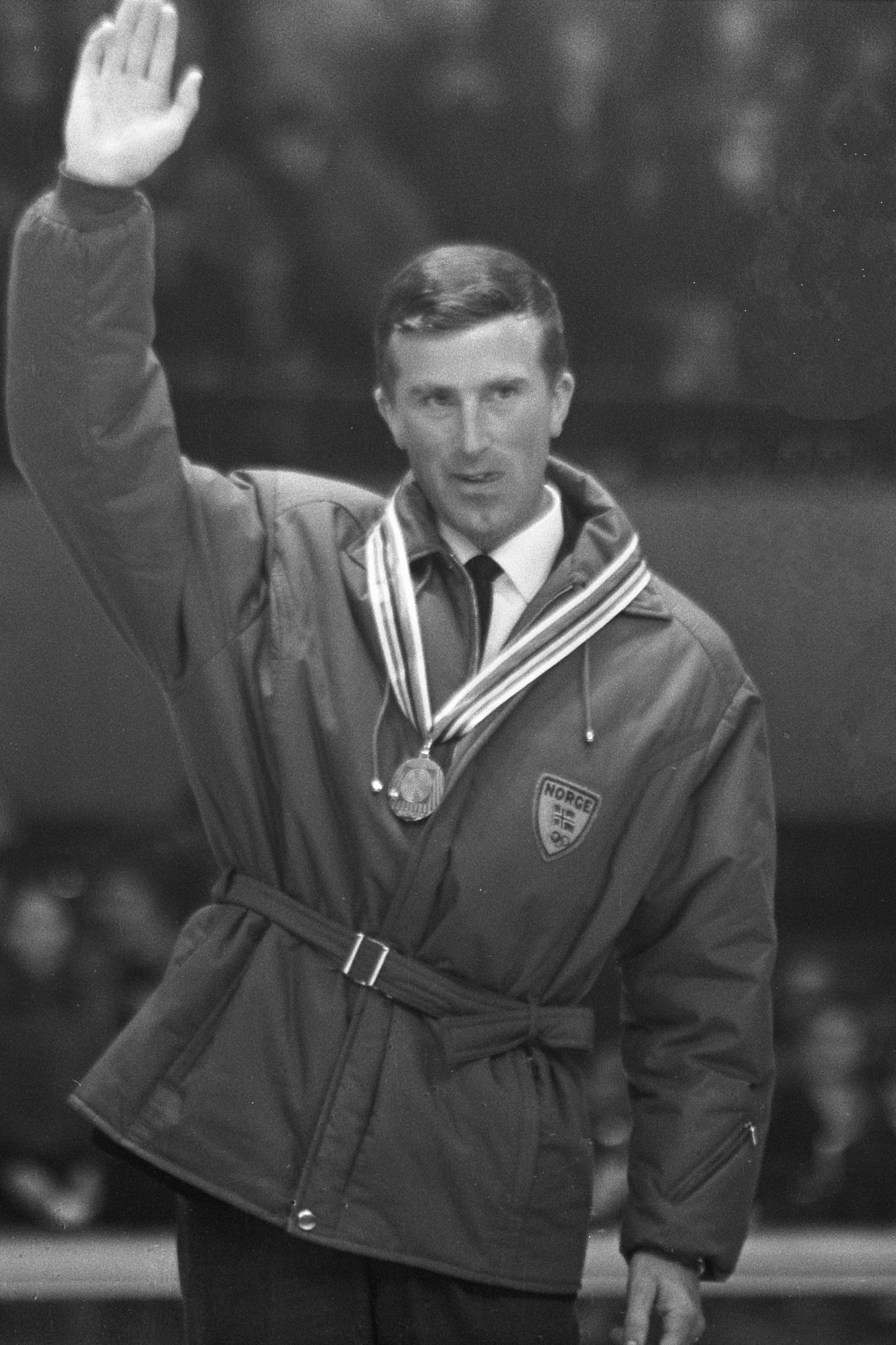
- Solberg on a podium at the 1968 Winter Olympics

Personal information
- Full name: Magnar Solberg
- Born: 4 February 1937 (age 89) Soknedal, Sør-Trøndelag, Norway
- Height: 180 cm (5 ft 11 in)
- Weight: 68 kg (150 lb)

Sport

Professional information
- Sport: Biathlon
- Club: Heimevernsdistrikt 12, Trondheim

Olympic Games
- Teams: 2 (1968, 1972)
- Medals: 3 (2 gold)

World Championships
- Teams: 3 (1969, 1970, 1971)
- Medals: 5 (0 gold)
Medal record
Men's biathlon
Representing Norway
Olympic Games
Gold medal – first place	1968 Grenoble	20 km individual
Gold medal – first place	1972 Sapporo	20 km individual
Silver medal – second place	1968 Grenoble	4 × 7.5 km relay
World Championships
Silver medal – second place	1969 Zakopane	4 × 7.5 km relay
Bronze medal – third place	1969 Zakopane	20 km individual
Silver medal – second place	1970 Östersund	4 × 7.5 km relay
Silver medal – second place	1971 Hämeenlinna	4 × 7.5 km relay
Bronze medal – third place	1971 Hämeenlinna	20 km individual

Magnar Solberg (born 4 February 1937) is a former Norwegian biathlete and police officer. He won a gold medal in the 20 km at the 1968 and 1972 Winter Olympics; his 4 × 7.5 km relay teams placed second in 1968 and fourth in 1972. In 1968 he was awarded Morgenbladets Gullmedalje, and in 1972 served as the Olympic flag bearer for Norway at the opening ceremony. He was one of the 16 former Norwegian athletes selected to bring in the Olympic Flag at the Opening Ceremony of the 1994 Winter Olympics.

After retiring from competitions Solberg became a police officer. He was one of the officers responsible for the miscarriage of justice against Fritz Moen, by adjusting a murder victim's time of death in order to dismiss Moen's alibi. He later admitted to wrongdoing, retired from the police force, and worked in the insurance industry.

== Biathlon results ==
All results are sourced from the International Biathlon Union.

=== Olympic Games ===
3 medals (2 gold, 1 silver)

Event	Individual	Relay
(France) 1968 Grenoble	Gold	Silver
(Japan) 1972 Sapporo	Gold	4th

=== World Championships ===
5 medals (3 silver, 2 bronze)

Event	Individual	Relay
(Polish People's Republic) 1969 Zakopane	Bronze	Silver
(Sweden) 1970 Östersund	—	Silver
(Finland) 1971 Hämeenlinna	Bronze	Silver

*During Olympic seasons competitions are only held for those events not included in the Olympic program.
