= Ian Todd (alpine skier) =

British alpine skier (born 1947)

Ian Todd was born on 26th June 1947 in Darlington, England. He is a British former alpine skier who competed in the 1968 Winter Olympics.
