= Jon Istad =

Norwegian biathlete and sport shooter

Personal information
- Full name: Jon Istad
- Born: 29 July 1937 Voss Municipality, Hordaland, Norway
- Died: 17 May 2012 (aged 74) Voss Municipality, Hordaland, Norway
- Height: 1.74 m (5 ft 9 in)

Sport

Professional information
- Sport: Biathlon
- Club: Voss IL

Olympic Games
- Teams: 3 (1960, 1964, 1968)
- Medals: 1 (0 gold)

World Championships
- Teams: 6 (1961, 1962, 1963, 1966, 1967, 1969)
- Medals: 7 (3 gold)
Medal record
Men's biathlon
Representing Norway
Olympic Games
Silver medal – second place	1968 Grenoble	4 × 7.5 km relay
World Championships
Gold medal – first place	1966 Garmisch-Partenkirchen	20 km individual
Gold medal – first place	1966 Garmisch-Partenkirchen	4 × 7.5 km relay
Gold medal – first place	1967 Altenberg	4 × 7.5 km relay
Silver medal – second place	1969 Zakopane	4 × 7.5 km relay
Bronze medal – third place	1962 Hämeenlinna	Team event
Bronze medal – third place	1963 Seefeld	Team event
Bronze medal – third place	1967 Altenberg	20 km individual

Jon Istad (29 July 1937 – 17 May 2012) was a Norwegian biathlete and sport shooter.

He was born in Voss Municipality and represented the club Voss IL. He was the father of Sverre Istad and uncle of Gro Marit Istad, both Olympians.

He competed at the 1960, 1964 and 1968 Winter Olympics, and all three times finished eleventh in the 20 kilometres. In 1968 he also won a silver medal with the Norwegian relay team. At the World Championships he won a gold medal in the 20 km event in 1966 in Garmisch-Partenkirchen, becoming the second biathlon world champion in Norway's history. In addition, he won two gold medals in relay in 1966 and 1967 and a silver medal in 1969. He was Norwegian champion in the 20 kilometres five times, and once in the relay.

Istad was also a national champion, European Championships bronze medalist and World Championships silver medalist (in the team competition) in sport shooting. He died in May 2012.

== Biathlon results ==
All results are sourced from the International Biathlon Union.

=== Olympic Games ===
1 medal (1 silver)

Event	Individual	Relay
(United States) 1960 Squaw Valley	11th	—N/a
(Austria) 1964 Innsbruck	11th	—N/a
(France) 1968 Grenoble	11th	Silver

*The relay was added as an event in 1968.

=== World Championships ===
7 medals (3 gold, 1 silver, 3 bronze)

Event	Individual	Team (time)	Relay
(Sweden) 1961 Umeå	21st	—	—N/a
(Finland) 1962 Hämeenlinna	6th	Bronze	—N/a
(Austria) 1963 Seefeld	5th	Bronze	—N/a
(West Germany) 1966 Garmisch-Partenkirchen	Gold	—N/a	Gold
(East Germany) 1967 Altenberg	Bronze	—N/a	Gold
(Polish People's Republic) 1969 Zakopane	9th	—N/a	Silver

*During Olympic seasons competitions are only held for those events not included in the Olympic program.
**The team (time) event was removed in 1965, whilst the relay was added in 1966.
