= Frederick Andrew =

British biathlete (1940–2007)

Personal information
- Nationality: British
- Born: 28 April 1940 Newtownards, Northern Ireland
- Died: 8 September 2007 (aged 67)

Sport
- Sport: Biathlon, cross-country skiing

Frederick Andrew (28 April 1940 –8 September 2007) was a British biathlete. He competed in the 20 km individual event at the 1968 Winter Olympics.
