= Kalevi Vähäkylä =

Finnish biathlete

Personal information
- Nationality: Finnish
- Born: 25 June 1940 (age 84); Salo, Finland

Sport
- Sport: Biathlon

Kalevi Vähäkylä (born 25 June 1940) is a Finnish biathlete. He competed in the 20 km individual event at the 1968 Winter Olympics.
