= Viktor Mamatov =

Soviet biathlete (1937–2023)

- Mamatov in 1971

Personal information
- Born: Viktor Fyodorovich Mamatov; 21 July 1937 Belovo, West Siberian Krai, Russian SFSR, USSR
- Died: 27 October 2023 (aged 86)
- Height: 1.82 m (6 ft 0 in)

Sport

Professional information
- Sport: Biathlon

Olympic Games
- Teams: 2 (1968, 1972)
- Medals: 2 (2 gold)

World Championships
- Teams: 4 (1967, 1969, 1970, 1971)
- Medals: 6 (4 gold)
Medal record
Men's biathlon
Representing Soviet Union
Olympic Games
Gold medal – first place	1968 Grenoble	4 × 7.5 km relay
Gold medal – first place	1972 Sapporo	4 × 7.5 km relay
World Championships
Gold medal – first place	1967 Altenberg	20 km individual
Gold medal – first place	1969 Zakopane	4 × 7.5 km relay
Gold medal – first place	1970 Östersund	4 × 7.5 km relay
Gold medal – first place	1971 Hämeenlinna	4 × 7.5 km relay
Silver medal – second place	1967 Altenberg	4 × 7.5 km relay
Bronze medal – third place	1970 Östersund	20 km individual

Viktor Fyodorovich Mamatov (Russian: Виктор Фёдорович Маматов; 21 July 1937 – 27 October 2023) was a Soviet biathlete. At the 1968 Winter Olympics in Grenoble, he won a gold medal with the Soviet relay team. He was Flag Bearer at the 1968 Olympics.

Mamatov received another gold medal at the 1972 Winter Olympics in Sapporo. He became World Champion in individual 20 km in 1967, and three times with the Soviet relay team, in 1969, 1970, and 1971.

After retiring from competitions, Mamatov had a long career as a biathlon coach and as a sports administrator. He was the head coach of the Soviet junior team from 1973 to 1976 and of the Soviet senior team from 1981 to 1985. He led the Soviet and then Russian delegations at the 1984, 1988, 1992, 1998, and 2002 Winter Olympics. He served as President of the Soviet Biathlon Federation (1987–1991), and as Vice-President of the International Biathlon Union (1993–2002), of the Russian Biathlon Union (1995–2010) and of the Russian Olympic Committee (1996–2006). He was awarded the Order "For Merit to the Fatherland" (1999) and Order of the Red Banner of Labour (1972, 1988).

Mamatov died on 27 October 2023, at the age of 86.

== Biathlon results ==
All results are sourced from the International Biathlon Union.

=== Olympic Games ===
2 medals (2 gold)

Event	Individual	Relay
(France) 1968 Grenoble	7th	Gold
(Japan) 1972 Sapporo	7th	Gold

=== World Championships ===
6 medals (4 gold, 1 silver, 1 bronze)

Event	Individual	Relay
(East Germany) 1967 Altenberg	Gold	Silver
(Polish People's Republic) 1969 Zakopane	14th	Gold
(Sweden) 1970 Östersund	Bronze	Gold
(Finland) 1971 Hämeenlinna	6th	Gold

*During Olympic seasons competitions are only held for those events not included in the Olympic program.
