= Olle Petrusson =

Swedish biathlete (1943–2025)

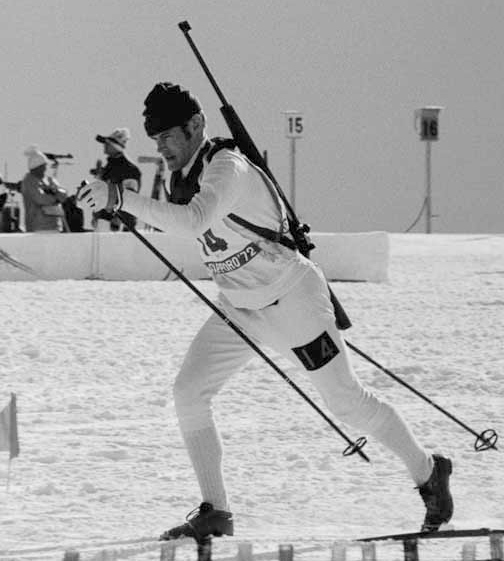
- Petrusson at the 1972 Olympics

Personal information
- Born: 14 November 1943 Nälden, Sweden
- Died: 2 March 2025 (aged 81)

Sport
- Sport: Biathlon
- Club: Tullus SG
Medal record
Representing Sweden
Olympic Games
Bronze medal – third place	1968 Grenoble	4 × 7.5 km
World championship
Bronze medal – third place	1966 Garmisch-Partenkirchen	4 × 7.5 km
Bronze medal – third place	1967 Altenberg	4 × 7.5 km

Olle Petrusson (14 November 1943 – 2 March 2025) was a Swedish biathlete. He won team bronze medals at the 1966 and at the 1967 Biathlon World Championships and at the 1968 Winter Olympics. At the 1972 Olympics his team finished fifth. He also competed at the 1972 Winter Olympics.

Domestically, Petrusson competed alongside his brother, Johan Petrusson. He died on 2 March 2025, at the age of 81.
