= Heinz Kluge =

German biathlete

Personal information
- Nationality: German
- Born: 21 May 1938 (age 86); Auerbach, Germany

Sport
- Sport: Biathlon

Heinz Kluge (born 21 May 1938) is a German biathlete. He competed in the 20 km individual event at the 1968 Winter Olympics.
