= Holmfrid Olsson =

Swedish biathlete (1943–2009)

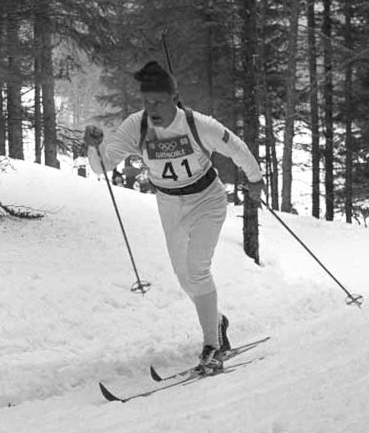
- Olsson at the 1968 Olympics

Personal information
- Born: 20 May 1943 Rörbäcksnäs, Malung-Sälen, Sweden
- Died: 27 January 2009 (aged 65) Lima, Sweden
- Height: 189 cm (6 ft 2 in)
- Weight: 88 kg (194 lb)

Sport
- Sport: Biathlon
- Club: Rörbäcksnäs SF
Medal record
Representing Sweden
Olympic Games
Bronze medal – third place	1968 Grenoble	4×7.5 km relay
World championship
Bronze medal – third place	1966 Garmisch-Partenkirchen	4×7.5 km relay
Bronze medal – third place	1967 Altenberg	4×7.5 km relay

Holmfrid Olsson (20 May 1943 – 27 January 2009) was a Swedish biathlete. He competed at the 1968 and 1972 Olympics and finished in third and fifth place in the 4×7.5 km relay, respectively. He placed 20–21st in the individual 20 km race. He won two more bronze medals in the 4×7.5 km relay at the 1966 and 1967 Biathlon World Championships.
