= Marcus Halliday =

British biathlete (born 1937)

Personal information
- Nationality: British
- Born: 15 July 1937 (age 88)

Sport
- Sport: Biathlon

Marcus Halliday (born 15 July 1937) is a British biathlete. He competed in the 20 km individual event at the 1968 Winter Olympics.
