= Józef Różak =

Polish biathlete (born 1945)

Personal information
- Nationality: Polish
- Born: 5 February 1945 (age 80); Kościelisko, Poland

Sport
- Sport: Biathlon

Józef Różak (born 5 February 1945) is a Polish biathlete. He competed at the 1968 Winter Olympics and the 1972 Winter Olympics.
