= Alan Notley =

British biathlete (born 1940)

Personal information
- Nationality: British
- Born: 10 April 1940 (age 84); Poole, England

Sport
- Sport: Biathlon

Alan Notley (born 10 April 1940) is a British biathlete. He competed at the 1964 Winter Olympics, the 1968 Winter Olympics and the 1972 Winter Olympics.
