= West Germany at the 1968 Winter Olympics =

- Flag of Germany superimposed with the Olympic rings
- IOC code: FRG (ALL used at these Games)
- NOC: National Olympic Committee for Germany

in Grenoble, France 6 February 1968 – 18 February 1968
- Competitors: 87 (67 men, 20 women) in 10 sports
- Flag bearer: Hans Plenk (luge)
- Medals Ranked 8th: Gold 2 Silver 2 Bronze 3 Total 7

Winter Olympics appearances (overview)
- 1968; 1972; 1976; 1980; 1984; 1988

Other related appearances
- Germany (1928–1936, 1952, 1992–pres.); United Team of Germany (1956–1964)

West Germany (Federal Republic of Germany) competed at the 1968 Winter Olympics in Grenoble. West German athletes had competed together with East German athletes as the United Team of Germany in the previous three Winter Olympic Games, but both nations sent independent teams starting in 1968.

== Medalists ==
Medal	Name	Sport	Event
Gold	Franz Keller	Nordic combined	Men's individual
Gold	Erhard Keller	Speed skating	Men's 500m
Silver	Horst Floth; Pepi Bader	Bobsleigh	Two-man
Silver	Christa Schmuck	Luge	Women's individual
Bronze	Margot Glockshuber; Wolfgang Danne	Figure skating	Pairs
Bronze	Wolfgang Winkler; Fritz Nachmann	Luge	Men's doubles
Bronze	Angelika Dünhaupt	Luge	Women's individual

== Alpine skiing ==
Men

Athlete	Event	Race 1		Race 2		Total	
Athlete	Event	Time	Rank	Time	Rank	Time	Rank
Dieter Fersch	Downhill					2:03.41	19
Franz Vogler	Downhill					2:02.94	15
Luggi Leitner	Downhill					2:02.54	12
Gerhard Prinzing	Downhill					2:02.10	7
Gerhard Prinzing	Giant Slalom	DSQ	–	–	–	DSQ	–
Sepp Heckelmiller	Giant Slalom	1:48.25	26	1:50.70	20	3:38.95	24
Luggi Leitner	Giant Slalom	1:47.64	24	1:51.21	27	3:38.85	23
Willi Lesch	Giant Slalom	1:47.48	21	1:51.35	30	3:38.83	22

Men's slalom

Athlete	Heat 1		Heat 2		Final					
Athlete	Time	Rank	Time	Rank	Time 1	Rank	Time 2	Rank	Total	Rank
Willi Lesch	52.07	2 QF	–	–	51.28	16	DSQ	–	DSQ	–
Max Rieger	54.20	3	54.52	1 QF	53.81	35	51.57	12	1:45.38	20
Alfred Hagn	54.04	3	55.43	1 QF	52.95	30	51.70	13	1:44.65	16
Luggi Leitner	55.34	3	53.47	1 QF	50.89	14	52.61	19	1:43.50	12

Women

Athlete	Event	Race 1		Race 2		Total	
Athlete	Event	Time	Rank	Time	Rank	Time	Rank
Rosi Mittermaier	Downhill					1:47.73	25
Christine Laprell	Downhill					1:47.62	24
Margret Hafen	Downhill					1:45.33	19
Burgl Färbinger	Downhill					1:44.29	14
Rosi Mittermaier	Giant Slalom					1:58.75	20
Margret Hafen	Giant Slalom					1:58.47	18
Christine Laprell	Giant Slalom					1:58.12	15
Burgl Färbinger	Giant Slalom					1:57.20	10
Christl Hintermaier	Slalom	44.67	18	49.95	18	1:34.62	16
Christine Laprell	Slalom	42.94	10	48.31	11	1:31.25	10
Rosi Mittermaier	Slalom	42.90	9	DSQ	–	DSQ	–
Burgl Färbinger	Slalom	42.70	8	46.20	6	1:28.90	6

== Biathlon ==
Men

Event	Athlete	Time	Penalties	Adjusted time ^{1}	Rank
20 km	Herbert Hindelang	1'21:48.5	10	1'31:48.5	41
20 km	Xaver Kraus	1'18:40.2	12	1'30:40.2	39
20 km	Gerhard Gehring	1'20:26.8	8	1'28:26.8	32
20 km	Theo Merkel	1'18:10.5	4	1'22:10.5	12

^{1}One minute added per close miss (a hit in the outer ring), two minutes added per complete miss.

Men's 4 x 7.5 km relay

Athletes	Race		
Athletes	Misses ^{2}	Time	Rank
Herbert Hindelang; Theo Merkel; Xaver Kraus; Gerhard Gehring	6	2'29:56.6	9

^{2}A penalty loop of 200 metres had to be skied per missed target.

== Bobsleigh ==
Sled	Athletes	Event	Run 1		Run 2		Run 3		Run 4		Total	
Sled	Athletes	Event	Time	Rank	Time	Rank	Time	Rank	Time	Rank	Time	Rank
FRG-1	Horst Floth; Pepi Bader	Two-man	1:10.76	5	1:10.43	1	1:10.20	1	1:10.15	2	4:41.54	2nd place, silver medalist(s)
FRG-2	Wolfgang Zimmerer; Peter Utzschneider	Two-man	1:12.36	15	1:11.94	8	1:10.77	4	1:11.33	4	4:46.40	7

Sled	Athletes	Event	Run 1		Run 2		Total	
Sled	Athletes	Event	Time	Rank	Time	Rank	Time	Rank
FRG-1	Horst Floth; Willi Schäfer; Frank Lange; Pepi Bader	Four-man	1:10.49	5	1:07.84	5	2:18.33	5
FRG-2	Wolfgang Zimmerer; Stefan Gaisreiter; Hans Baumann; Peter Utzschneider	Four-man	1:11.12	13	1:08.35	8	2:19.47	9

== Cross-country skiing ==
Men

Event	Athlete	Race	
Event	Athlete	Time	Rank
15 km	Klaus Ganter	52:30.0	39
15 km	Helmut Gerlach	52:21.8	38
15 km	Karl Buhl	50:38.1	20
15 km	Walter Demel	49:38.4	12
30 km	Karlheinz Scherzinger	1'47:08.7	48
30 km	Herbert Steinbeißer	1'46:31.2	46
30 km	Karl Buhl	1'42:52.2	31
30 km	Walter Demel	1'37:49.2	9
50 km	Klaus Ganter	DNF	–
50 km	Siegfried Weiß	2'46:53.4	43
50 km	Helmut Gerlach	2'41:55.8	33
50 km	Walter Demel	2'31:14.4	9

Men's 4 × 10 km relay

Athletes	Race	
Athletes	Time	Rank
Helmut Gerlach; Walter Demel; Herbert Steinbeißer; Karl Buhl	2'19:37.6	8

Women

Event	Athlete	Race	
Event	Athlete	Time	Rank
5 km	Barbara Barthel	18:20.0	29
5 km	Michaela Endler	17:59.2	25
5 km	Monika Mrklas	17:32.5	17
10 km	Barbara Barthel	DNF	–
10 km	Michaela Endler	41:01.1	26
10 km	Monika Mrklas	39:58.2	20

Women's 3 x 5 km relay

Athletes	Race	
Athletes	Time	Rank
Michaela Endler; Barbara Barthel; Monika Mrklas	1'01:49.3	7

== Figure skating ==
Men

Athlete	CF	FS	Points	Places	Rank
Jürgen Eberwein	25	22	1530.3	219	24
Peter Krick	7	16	1723.2	104	12

Women

Athlete	CF	FS	Points	Places	Rank
Eileen Zillmer	12	23	1600.3	171	19
Petra Ruhrmann	16	18	1611.2	161	17
Monika Feldmann	11	13	1687.1	99	10

Pairs

Athletes	SP	FS	Points	Places	Rank
Marianne Streifler; Herbert Wiesinger	12	11	282.7	100	11
Gudrun Hauss; Walter Häfner	7	9	293.6	67	8
Margot Glockshuber; Wolfgang Danne	3	3	304.4	30	3rd place, bronze medalist(s)

== Ice hockey ==
=== First round ===
West Germany - Romania 7:0 (1:0, 3:0, 3:0)
Goalscorers: Gustav Hanig 2, Alois Schloder, Ernst Kopf, Otto Schneitberger, Horst Meindl, Heinz Weisenbach.

=== Final Round ===
Rank	Team	Pld	W	L	T	GF	GA	Pts
1	Soviet Union	7	6	1	0	48	10	12
2	Czechoslovakia	7	5	1	1	33	17	11
3	Canada	7	5	2	0	28	15	10
4	Sweden	7	4	2	1	23	18	9
5	Finland	7	3	3	1	17	23	7
6	United States	7	2	4	1	23	28	5
7	West Germany	7	1	6	0	13	39	2
8	East Germany	7	0	7	0	13	48	0

Canada – West Germany 6:1 (0:0, 4:1, 2:0)
Goalscorers: Bourbonnais 2, Cadieux, Dineen, Mott, Huck – Kopf.
Referees: Seglin, Snětkov (URS)

Czechoslovakia – West Germany 5:1 (1:0, 2:0, 2:1)
Goalscorers: Hrbatý, Golonka, Havel, Hejma, Ševčík – Lax.
Referees: Kubinec, McEvoy (CAN)

Sweden – West Germany 5:4 (4:3, 0:0, 1:1)
Goalscorers: Svedberg, Lundström, Nordlander, Olsson, Öberg – Kuhn, Hanig, Reif, Kopf.
Referees: Kořínek, Bucala (TCH)

(Soviet Union) USSR – West Germany 9:1 (4:1, 4:0, 1:0)
Goalscorers: Populanov 2, Alexandrov 2, Ionov, Staršinov, Majorov, Mojsejev, Firsov – Funk.
Referees: Trumble (USA), Valentin (AUT)

(United States) USA – West Germany 8:1 (2:1, 4:0, 2:0)
Goalscorers: Volmar 2, Ross, Morrison, Nanne, Pleau, Cunnoff, P. Hurley – Funk.
Referees: McEvoy (CAN), Seglin (URS)

Finland– West Germany 4:1 (2:1, 1:0, 1:0)
Goalscorers: Leimu 2, Ketola, J. Peltonen – Schloder.
Referees: Kořínek, Bucala (TCH)

East Germany – West Germany 2:4 (0:1, 1:2, 1:1)
Goalscorers: Hiller, Fuchs – Funk, Waitl, Hanig, Lax.
Referees: McEvoy (CAN), Kořínek (TCH)

=== Contestants ===
7. WEST GERMANY
Goaltenders: Josef Schramm, Günther Knauss.
Defence: Leonhard Eaitl, Johannes Schichtl, Rudolf Thanner, Otto Schneitberger, Josef Völk, Heinz Bader.
Forwards: Josef Reif, Ernst Köpf, Bernd Kuhn, Lorenz Funk, Alois Schloder, Gustav Hanig, Horst Meindl, Heinz Weisenbach, Manfred Gmeiner, Peter Lax.
Coach: Ed Riegle.

== Luge ==
Men

Athlete	Run 1		Run 2		Run 3		Total	
Athlete	Time	Rank	Time	Rank	Time	Rank	Time	Rank
Fritz Nachmann	58.54	16	59.05	17	58.82	16	2:56.41	17
Wolfgang Winkler	58.08	10	58.86	14	58.41	10	2:55.35	11
Leonhard Nagenrauft	57.87	7	58.45	9	58.39	9	2:54.71	9
Hans Plenk	57.30	2	58.37	7	58.00	6	2:53.67	6

(Men's) Doubles

Athletes	Run 1		Run 2		Total	
Athletes	Time	Rank	Time	Rank	Time	Rank
Wolfgang Winkler; Fritz Nachmann	48.58	3	48.71	3	1:37.29	3rd place, bronze medalist(s)
Hans Plenk; Bernhard Aschauer	48.70	4	48.91	5	1:37.61	4

Women

Athlete	Run 1		Run 2		Run 3		Total	
Athlete	Time	Rank	Time	Rank	Time	Rank	Time	Rank
Ute Gähler	49.78	10	49.93	4	50.71	7	2:30.42	8
Angelika Dünhaupt	49.34	4	49.88	3	50.34	2	2:29.56	3rd place, bronze medalist(s)
Christa Schmuck	49.15	2	49.84	2	50.38	3	2:29.37	2nd place, silver medalist(s)

== Nordic combined ==
Events:

- normal hill ski jumping (Three jumps, best two counted and shown here.)
- 15 km cross-country skiing

Athlete	Event	Ski Jumping				Cross-country			Total	
Athlete	Event	Distance 1	Distance 2	Points	Rank	Time	Points	Rank	Points	Rank
Günther Naumann	Individual	67.5	68.5	190.0	28	49:48.5	220.89	5	410.89	14
Hans Rudhardt	Individual	71.0	72.5	195.4	22	53:15.3	179.34	28	374.74	29
Franz Keller	Individual	73.0	77.5	240.1	1	50:45.2	208.94	13	449.04	1st place, gold medalist(s)
Alfred Winkler	Individual	71.5	71.0	192.8	25	52:26.0	188.79	24	381.59	25

== Ski jumping ==
Athlete	Event	Jump 1		Jump 2		Total	
Athlete	Event	Distance	Points	Distance	Points	Points	Rank
Heini Ihle	Normal hill	75.5	102.6	70.0	94.8	197.4	22
Henrik Ohlmeyer	Normal hill	75.0	104.8	67.5	88.8	193.6	28
Günther Göllner	Normal hill	77.0	109.5	70.5	97.6	207.1	10
Heini Ihle	Large hill	82.0	73.7	84.5	82.7	156.4	46
Henrik Ohlmeyer	Large hill	90.5	92.6	86.0	85.3	177.9	33
Franz Keller	Large hill	90.5	93.6	84.0	80.5	174.1	36
Günther Göllner	Large hill	93.0	96.6	85.0	86.9	183.5	29

== Speed skating ==
Men

Event	Athlete	Race	
Event	Athlete	Time	Rank
500 m	Günter Traub	42.5	31
500 m	Gerd Zimmermann	41.5	19
500 m	Herbert Höfl	41.0	11
500 m	Erhard Keller	40.3	1st place, gold medalist(s)
1500 m	Jürgen Traub	2:10.2	22
1500 m	Günter Traub	2:07.7	15
5000 m	Jürgen Traub	7:55.3	20
5000 m	Günter Traub	7:40.4	13
10,000 m	Jürgen Traub	16:33.8	18
10,000 m	Günter Traub	16:01.3	11

Women

Event	Athlete	Race	
Event	Athlete	Time	Rank
500 m	Hildegard Sellhuber	48.4	21
500 m	Evi Sappl	47.4	12
1000 m	Evi Sappl	1:37.4	17
1000 m	Hildegard Sellhuber	1:37.2	16
1500 m	Paula Dufter	2:45.2	30
1500 m	Hildegard Sellhuber	2:27.5	9
3000 m	Paula Dufter	5:27.0	19
