= United States at the 1968 Winter Olympics =

- Flag of the United States
- IOC code: USA
- NOC: United States Olympic Committee

in Grenoble
- Competitors: 96 (75 men, 21 women) in 6 sports
- Flag bearer: Terry McDermott
- Medals Ranked 9th: Gold 1 Silver 5 Bronze 1 Total 7

Winter Olympics appearances (overview)
- 1924; 1928; 1932; 1936; 1948; 1952; 1956; 1960; 1964; 1968; 1972; 1976; 1980; 1984; 1988; 1992; 1994; 1998; 2002; 2006; 2010; 2014; 2018; 2022; 2026

The United States competed at the 1968 Winter Olympics in Grenoble, France.

== Medalists ==
The following U.S. competitors won medals at the games. In the by discipline sections below, medalists' names are bolded.

Medal	Name	Sport	Event	Date
Gold	Peggy Fleming	Figure skating	Women's singles	February 10
Silver	Jenny Fish	Speed skating	Women's 500 meters	February 9
Silver	Dianne Holum	Speed skating	Women's 500 meters	February 9
Silver	Mary Meyers	Speed skating	Women's 500 meters	February 9
Silver	Terry McDermott	Speed skating	Men's 500 meters	February 14
Silver	Tim Wood	Figure skating	Men's singles	February 16
Bronze	Dianne Holum	Speed skating	Women's 1000 meters	February 11

Multiple medalists
Name	Sport	1st place, gold medalist(s)	2nd place, silver medalist(s)	3rd place, bronze medalist(s)	Total
Dianne Holum	Speed skating	0	1	1	**2**

== Alpine skiing ==
Men

Athlete	Event	Heat 1		Heat 2		Final					
Athlete	Event	Heat 1		Heat 2		Run 1		Run 2		Total	
Athlete	Event	Time	Rank	Time	Rank	Time	Rank	Time	Rank	Time	Rank
Jim Barrows	Downhill	—N/a								DNF	
Jere Elliott	Downhill	—N/a								DNF	
Billy Kidd	Downhill	—N/a								2:03.40	18
Dennis McCoy	Downhill	—N/a								2:04.82	21
Rick Chaffee	Giant slalom	—N/a				1:46.44	13	1:49.75	14	3:36.19	15
Jimmy Heuga	Giant slalom	—N/a				1:45.46	7	1:48.43	9	3:33.89	10
Billy Kidd	Giant slalom	—N/a				1:45.91	8	1:46.46	1	3:32.37	5
Spider Sabich	Giant slalom	—N/a				1:46.34	12	1:49.81	15	3:36.15	14
Rick Chaffee	Slalom	54.28	1 **QF**	Bye		49.95	10	51.24	10	1:41.19	9
Jimmy Heuga	Slalom	52.34	1 **QF**	Bye		49.96	11	51.01	9	1:40.97	7
Billy Kidd	Slalom	53.37	1 **QF**	Bye		DNF					
Spider Sabich	Slalom	53.52	2 **QF**	Bye		49.75	4	50.74	7	1:40.49	5

Women

Athlete	Event	Run 1		Run 2		Total	
Athlete	Event	Time	Rank	Time	Rank	Time	Rank
Karen Budge	Downhill	—N/a				DNS	
Suzy Chaffee	Downhill	—N/a				1:48.50	28
Kiki Cutter	Downhill	—N/a				1:44.94	17
Sandy Shellworth	Downhill	—N/a				1:46.53	21
Wendy Allen	Giant slalom	—N/a				2:00.03	22
Suzy Chaffee	Giant slalom	—N/a				1:58.38	17
Kiki Cutter	Giant slalom	—N/a				1:59.52	21
Judy Nagel	Giant slalom	—N/a				1:57.39	12
Wendy Allen	Slalom	DSQ					
Kiki Cutter	Slalom	DSQ					
Rosie Fortna	Slalom	DSQ					
Judy Nagel	Slalom	40.19	1	DSQ			

== Biathlon ==
Athlete	Event	Time	Misses	Rank
Jonathan Chaffee	Individual	1:34:21.1	11 (3+2+4+2)	49
Bill Spencer	Individual	1:30:17.7	10 (2+3+1+4)	37
Ralph Wakley	Individual	1:27:32.9	5 (1+1+3+0)	27
Edward Williams	Individual	1:32:24.5	9 (2+5+0+2)	45
John Ehrensbeck; Bill Spencer; Ralph Wakley; Edward Williams	Relay	2:28:35.5	8	8

== Bobsleigh ==
Athletes	Event	Run 1		Run 2		Run 3		Run 4		Total	
Athletes	Event	Time	Rank	Time	Rank	Time	Rank	Time	Rank	Time	Rank
Howard Clifton; Michael Luce	Two-man	1:12.10	14	1:12.18	10	1:11.88	9	1:13.15	15	4:49.31	11
Paul Lamey; Robert Huscher	Two-man	1:11.30	8	1:11.54	4	1:11.04	6	1:12.15	9	4:46.03	6
Bill Hickey; Howard Clifton; Michael Luce; Paul Savage	Four-man	1:11.45	14	1:08.92	14	—N/a				2:20.37	15
Boris Said; David Dunn; Robert Crowley; Phil Duprey	Four-man	1:11.08	11	1:08.48	10	—N/a				2:19.56	10

== Cross-country skiing ==
Athlete	Event	Time	Rank
Larry Damon	Men's 15 km	55:07.2	55
Mike Elliott	Men's 15 km	52:40.8	41
Mike Gallagher	Men's 15 km	52:02.4	34
Bob Gray	Men's 15 km	53:24.8	48
Mike Elliott	Men's 30 km	1:42:22.6	29
Mike Gallagher	Men's 30 km	1:41:58.2	27
Charles Kellogg	Men's 30 km	1:50:03.7	51
Jon Lufkin	Men's 30 km	1:51:21.2	55
Larry Damon	Men's 50 km	2:41:25.2	32
Mike Elliott	Men's 50 km	2:40:38.5	30
Mike Gallagher	Men's 50 km	2:36:26.1	22
Charles Kellogg	Men's 50 km	2:44:00.4	36
John Bower; Mike Elliott; Mike Gallagher; Bob Gray	Men's 4 × 10 km relay	2:21:30.4	12

== Figure skating ==
Ladies' singles skater Peggy Fleming built up a huge lead after the compulsory figures and won the first-place votes of all nine judges. Her victory marked the first gold medal won by an American after the death of an entire US figure skating team in an air crash in 1961, and heralded an American figure skating renaissance.

Individual

Athlete	Event	CF	FS	Total		
Athlete	Event	Rank	Rank	Points	Places	Rank
John Misha Petkevich	Men's singles	8	4	1806.2	56	6
Gary Visconti	Men's singles	6	5	1810.2	52	5
**Tim Wood**	Men's singles	2	3	1891.6	17	2nd place, silver medalist(s)
**Peggy Fleming**	Ladies' singles	1	1	1970.5	9	1st place, gold medalist(s)
Janet Lynn	Ladies' singles	14	6	1698.7	90	9
Albertina Noyes	Ladies' singles	5	7	1797.3	40	4

Mixed

Athlete	Event	SP	FS	Total		
Athlete	Event	Rank	Rank	Points	Places	Rank
Cynthia Kauffman; Ronald Kauffman	Pairs	5	7	297.0	58	6
JoJo Starbuck; Kenneth Shelley	Pairs	14	12	276.0	121	13
Sandi Sweitzer; Roy Wagelein	Pairs	8	6	294.5	64.5	7

== Ice hockey ==
Summary

Team	Event	First round	Medal round							
Team	Event	Opposition Score	Opposition Score	Opposition Score	Opposition Score	Opposition Score	Opposition Score	Opposition Score	Opposition Score	Rank
United States men	Men's tournament	Bye	Czechoslovakia; **L** 1–5	Sweden; **L** 3–4	Soviet Union; **L** 2–10	Canada; **L** 2–3	West Germany; **W** 8–1	East Germany; **W** 6–4	Finland; **T** 1–1	6

Roster
Coach: Murray Williamson

Pos.	Name
G	Jim Logue
G	Pat Rupp
D	Robert Gaudreau
D	Paul Hurley
D	Lou Nanne
D	Bob Paradise
D	Bruce Riutta
D	Donald Ross
F	Herb Brooks
F	John Cunniff
F	Jack Dale
F	Craig Falkman
F	Tom Hurley
F	Leonard Lilyholm
F	Jack Morrison
F	Larry Pleau
F	Larry Stordahl
F	Doug Volmar

Medal Round

Rank	Team	Pld	W	L	T	GF	GA	Pts
1	Soviet Union	7	6	1	0	48	10	12
2	Czechoslovakia	7	5	1	1	33	17	11
3	Canada	7	5	2	0	28	15	10
4	Sweden	7	4	2	1	23	18	9
5	Finland	7	3	3	1	17	23	7
6	United States	7	2	4	1	23	28	5
7	West Germany	7	1	6	0	13	39	2
8	East Germany	7	0	7	0	13	48	0

Czechoslovakia – (United States) USA 5:1 (1:1, 2:0, 2:0)
Goalscorers: Suchý, Havel, Jiřík, Hejma, Jiří Holík – Volmar.
Referees: Dahlberg, Wiking (SWE)

Sweden – (United States) USA 4:3 (0:0, 4:2, 0:1)
Goalscorers: Nilsson, Wickberg, Hedlund, Bengsston – Falkman, Lilyholm, Nanne.
Referees: McEvoy, Kubinec (CAN)

(Soviet Union) USSR – (United States) USA 10:2 (6:0, 4:2, 0:0)
Goalscorers: Firsov 3, Blinov 2, Populanov 2, Kuzkin, Staršinov, Mojsejev – Ross, Morrison.
Referees: Dahlberg (SWE), Kubinec (CAN)

Canada – (United States) USA 3:2 (1:2, 0:0, 2:0)
Goalscorers: Cadieux 2, Johnston – Pleau, Riutta.
Referees: Snětkov, Seglin (URS)

(United States) USA – West Germany 8:1 (2:1, 4:0, 2:0)
Goalscorers: Volmar 2, Ross, Morrison, Nanne, Pleau, Cunnoff, P. Hurley – Funk.
Referees: McEvoy (CAN), Seglin (URS)

East Germany – (United States) USA 4:6 (1:3, 1:1, 2:2)
Goalscorers: Fuchs 2, Karrenbauer 2 – Stordahl 2, P. Hurley 2, Volmar, Lilyholm.
Referees: Kubinec (CAN), Seglin (URS)

(United States) USA – Finland 1:1 (1:1, 0:0, 0:0)
Goalscorers: Volmar – Wahlsten.
Referees: Kubinec (CAN), Seglin (URS)

== Luge ==
Men

Athlete	Event	Run 1		Run 2		Run 3		Total	
Athlete	Event	Time	Rank	Time	Rank	Time	Rank	Time	Rank
Mike Hessel	Singles	1:00.00	29	1:00.46	32	1:00.16	29	3:00.62	30
Kim Layton	Singles	59.73	27	59.45	23	59.46	24	2:58.64	26
James Murray	Singles	1:00.34	32	59.94	29	59.72	26	3:00.00	28
Robin Partch	Singles	1:30.36	47	59.78	28	59.53	25	3:29.67	46
Mike Hessel; Jim Moriarty	Doubles	DNS				—N/a		DNS	

Women

Athlete	Event	Run 1		Run 2		Run 3		Total	
Athlete	Event	Time	Rank	Time	Rank	Time	Rank	Time	Rank
Sheila Johansen	Singles	51.21	15	51.90	19	52.36	18	2:35.47	17
Kathleen Ann Roberts-Homstad	Singles	50.62	12	51.04	15	51.94	15	2:33.60	14
Ellen Williams	Singles	51.67	16	51.09	16	52.39	19	2:35.15	16

== Nordic combined ==
Athlete	Event	Ski Jumping				Cross-country			Total	
Athlete	Event	Jump 1	Jump 2	Points	Rank	Time	Points	Rank	Points	Rank
John Bower	Individual	104.2	101.0	205.2	14	51:00.1	205.96	16	411.16	13
Georg Krog	Individual	105.4	106.8	212.2	11	53:55.9	171.56	33	383.76	22
Jim Miller	Individual	85.1	86.5	171.6	35	50:56.0	206.78	15	378.38	26
Tom Upham	Individual	92.2	90.0	182.2	31	56:30.5	142.97	40	325.17	39

== Ski jumping ==
Athlete	Event	Jump 1		Jump 2		Total	
Athlete	Event	Distance	Points	Distance	Points	Points	Rank
Bill Bakke	Normal hill	69.5	90.0	70.0	90.8	180.8	40
John Balfanz	Normal hill	72.5	97.8	68.5	91.9	189.7	33
Jay Rand	Normal hill	70.0	85.8	70.5	92.6	178.4	42
Adrian Watt	Normal hill	71.0	86.9	68.0	87.1	174.0	44
Bill Bakke	Large hill	90.5	90.1	87.5	85.4	175.5	34
John Balfanz	Large hill	84.5	83.7	85.5	86.1	169.8	42
Jay Martin	Large hill	85.0	81.4	85.0	82.4	163.8	43
Jay Rand	Large hill	90.0	90.9	86.0	83.8	174.7	35

== Speed skating ==
Men

Athlete	Event	Time	Rank
Neil Blatchford	500 m	40.7	5
Tom Gray	500 m	41.6	21
**Terry McDermott**	500 m	40.5	2nd place, silver medalist(s)
John Wurster	500 m	40.7	5
Roger Capan	1500 m	2:13.6	34
Bill Lanigan	1500 m	2:11.7	24
Wayne LeBombard	1500 m	2:11.2	23
Richard Wurster	1500 m	2:08.4	19
Bill Cox	5000 m	7:58.1	25
Bill Lanigan	5000 m	7:57.7	24
Wayne LeBombard	5000 m	8:03.8	28
Bill Cox	10,000 m	17:08.2	25
Bill Lanigan	10,000 m	16:50.1	21

Women

Athlete	Event	Time	Rank
**Jenny Fish**	500 m	46.3	2nd place, silver medalist(s)
**Dianne Holum**	500 m	46.3	2nd place, silver medalist(s)
**Mary Meyers**	500 m	46.3	2nd place, silver medalist(s)
Jeanne Ashworth	1000 m	1:34.7	7
Jenny Fish	1000 m	1:38.4	23
**Dianne Holum**	1000 m	1:33.4	3rd place, bronze medalist(s)
Jeanne Ashworth	1500 m	2:30.3	16
Dianne Holum	1500 m	2:28.5	13
Jeanne Omelenchuk	1500 m	2:35.5	25
Jeanne Ashworth	3000 m	5:14.0	10
Toy Dorgan	3000 m	5:17.6	14
Jeanne Omelenchuk	3000 m	5:14.9	11

== Sources ==
- Official Olympic Reports
- "Olympic Medal Winners". International Olympic Committee.
- Olympic Winter Games 1968, full results by sports-reference.com
