= Japan at the 1968 Winter Olympics =

- IOC code: JPN
- NOC: Japanese Olympic Committee
- Website: www.joc.or.jp (in Japanese and English)

in Grenoble
- Competitors: 61 (52 men, 9 women) in 8 sports
- Flag bearer: Takaaki Kaneiri
- Medals: Gold 0 Silver 0 Bronze 0 Total 0

Winter Olympics appearances (overview)
- 1928; 1932; 1936; 1948; 1952; 1956; 1960; 1964; 1968; 1972; 1976; 1980; 1984; 1988; 1992; 1994; 1998; 2002; 2006; 2010; 2014; 2018; 2022; 2026

Japan competed at the 1968 Winter Olympics in Grenoble, France.

As Sapporo would be the host city for the following Winter Olympics, the flag of Japan was raised at the closing ceremony.

== Alpine skiing ==
Men

Athlete	Event	Race 1		Race 2		Total	
Athlete	Event	Time	Rank	Time	Rank	Time	Rank
Juichi Maruyama	Downhill					2:19.33	64
Hitonari Maruyama	Downhill					2:18.04	59
Yoshiharu Fukuhara	Downhill					2:14.09	54
Tsuneo Noto	Downhill					2:10.32	45
Yoshinari Kida	Giant Slalom	DSQ	–	–	–	DSQ	–
Yoshiharu Fukuhara	Giant Slalom	1:53.96	51	1:58.01	56	3:51.97	50
Tomio Sasaki	Giant Slalom	1:53.16	46	1:56.99	51	3:50.15	47
Tsuneo Noto	Giant Slalom	1:52.55	43	1:54.10	40	3:46.65	40

Men's slalom

Athlete	Heat 1		Heat 2		Final					
Athlete	Time	Rank	Time	Rank	Time 1	Rank	Time 2	Rank	Total	Rank
Tsuneo Noto	DNF	–	56.60	2	did not advance					
Yoshiharu Fukuhara	DSQ	–	56.82	2	did not advance					
Yoshinari Kida	DSQ	–	57.87	2	did not advance					
Tomio Sasaki	55.98	4	56.62	2	did not advance					

Women

Athlete	Event	Race 1		Race 2		Total	
Athlete	Event	Time	Rank	Time	Rank	Time	Rank
Mihoko Otsue	Downhill					1:51.60	34
Mihoko Otsue	Giant Slalom					2:10.56	36
Mihoko Otsue	Slalom	46.78	26	1:04.59	31	1:51.37	31

== Biathlon ==
Men

Event	Athlete	Time	Penalties	Adjusted time ^{1}	Rank
20 km	Hajime Yoshimura	1'23:05.5	9	1'32:05.5	43
20 km	Shozo Okuyama	1'21:51.0	7	1'28:51.0	34
20 km	Isao Ono	1'20:47.8	8	1'28:47.8	33
20 km	Miki Shibuya	1'21:37.1	6	1'27:37.1	28

^{1} One minute added per close miss (a hit in the outer ring), two minutes added per complete miss.

Men's 4 x 7.5 km relay

Athletes	Race		
Athletes	Misses ^{2}	Time	Rank
Isao Ono; Miki Shibuya; Shozo Okuyama; Hajime Yoshimura	9	2'35:21.0	13

^{2} A penalty loop of 200 metres had to be skied per missed target.

== Cross-country skiing ==
Men

Event	Athlete	Race	
Event	Athlete	Time	Rank
15 km	Kazuo Sato	DNF	–
15 km	Hiroshi Ogawa	59:55.4	65
15 km	Akiyoshi Matsuoka	54:46.2	53
15 km	Tokio Sato	53:41.2	50
30 km	Kazuo Sato	1'46:12.4	45
30 km	Tokio Sato	1'43:13.8	33
50 km	Sotoo Okushiba	2'45:09.4	38
50 km	Tokio Sato	2'40:00.5	29

Men's 4 × 10 km relay

Athletes	Race	
Athletes	Time	Rank
Tokio Sato; Sotoo Okushiba; Kazuo Sato; Akiyoshi Matsuoka	2'20:54.8	10

Women

Event	Athlete	Race	
Event	Athlete	Time	Rank
5 km	Fujiko Kato	18:28.2	32
10 km	Fujiko Kato	40:40.0	23

== Figure skating ==
Men

Athlete	CF	FS	Points	Places	Rank
Yutaka Higuchi	23	26	1529.6	218	25
Tsuguhiko Kozuka	24	19	1584.0	189	21

Women

Athlete	CF	FS	Points	Places	Rank
Haruko Ishida	18	25	1552.7	218	26
Kazumi Yamashita	15	14	1639.0	139	14
Kumiko Okawa	8	5	1763.6	61	8

== Ice hockey ==
=== Consolation round ===
Teams in this group play for 9th-14th places. Japan entered in this round, from the start they did not play for a medal.

Rank	Team	Pld	W	L	T	GF	GA	Pts
9	Yugoslavia	5	5	0	0	33	9	10
10	Japan	5	4	1	0	27	12	8
11	Norway	5	3	2	0	15	15	6
12	Romania	5	2	3	0	22	23	4
13	Austria	5	1	4	0	12	27	2
14	France	5	0	5	0	9	32	0

(Socialist Federal Republic of Yugoslavia) Yugoslavia – Japan 5:1 (2:0, 0:0, 3:1)
Goalscorers: Tisler 2, Beravs, Felc, Mlakar – Iwamoto.

Japan – Norway 4:0 (2:0, 2:0, 0:0)
Goalscorers: Okajima 2, Ebina, Araki.

Japan – Romania 5:4 (3:0, 1:3, 1:1)
Goalscorers: Hikigi 2, Araki, Itoh, Kudo – Florescu, Pana, Mois, Ionescu.

Japan – Austria 11:1 (1:0, 6:0, 4:1)
Goalscorers: Itoh 2, Okajima 2, Hikigi 2, Araki, Kudo, Takashima, Toriyabe, Iwamoto – Puschnig.

France – Japan 2:6 (0:0, 0:4, 2:2)
Goalscorers: Mazza, Faucomprez – Ebina 2, Hikigi, Itoh, Okajima, Araki.

=== Contestants ===
10. JAPAN
Goaltenders: Katsuji Morishima, Toshimitsu Otsubo
Defence: Isao Asai, Michihiro Sato, Hisashi Kasai, Toru Itabashi, Takaaki Kaneiri, Kenji Toriyabe.
Forwards: Mamoru Takashima, Kimihisa Kudo, Koji Iwamoto, Takao Hikigi, Toru Okajima, Minoru Ito, Takeshi Akiba, Yutaka Ebina, Kazuo Matsuda, Nobuhiro Araki.

== Nordic combined ==
Events:

- normal hill ski jumping (Three jumps, best two counted and shown here.)
- 15 km cross-country skiing

Athlete	Event	Ski Jumping				Cross-country			Total	
Athlete	Event	Distance 1	Distance 2	Points	Rank	Time	Points	Rank	Points	Rank
Masatoshi Suto	Individual	62.0	66.0	183.0	30	53:32.6	176.03	31	359.03	31
Katsutoshi Okubo	Individual	66.0	69.5	194.8	23	52:33.1	187.43	26	382.23	24
Akemi Taniguchi	Individual	73.0	72.5	224.4	4	55:04.5	158.74	39	383.14	23
Hiroshi Itagaki	Individual	73.5	76.0	237.4	2	53:26.2	177.25	29	414.65	10

== Ski jumping ==
Athlete	Event	Jump 1		Jump 2		Total	
Athlete	Event	Distance	Points	Distance	Points	Points	Rank
Yukio Kasaya	Normal hill	71.0	95.4	72.0	101.0	196.4	23
Takashi Fujisawa	Normal hill	73.0	100.6	71.0	93.9	194.5	26
Masakatsu Asari	Normal hill	72.5	100.8	59.5	69.0	169.8	47
Akitsugu Konno	Normal hill	72.5	101.3	69.5	95.0	196.3	24
Seiji Aochi	Large hill	90.5	94.6	87.5	90.4	185.0	26
Akitsugu Konno	Large hill	91.5	95.5	90.5	95.6	191.1	20
Yukio Kasaya	Large hill	91.0	97.3	88.5	93.8	191.1	20
Takashi Fujisawa	Large hill	101.0	116.8	82.5	75.9	192.7	18

== Speed skating ==
Men

Event	Athlete	Race	
Event	Athlete	Time	Rank
500 m	Takayuki Hida	42.9	37
500 m	Tamio Dejima	42.6	33
500 m	Masaki Suzuki	41.2	15
500 m	Keiichi Suzuki	40.8	8
1500 m	Masaki Suzuki	2:14.8	40
1500 m	Mutsuhiko Maeda	2:14.8	40
1500 m	Keiichi Suzuki	2:13.1	31
1500 m	Tadao Ishihata	2:12.7	30
5000 m	Mutsuhiko Maeda	8:08.3	33
5000 m	Tadao Ishihata	7:55.8	22
5000 m	Yoshiaki Demachi	7:55.6	21
10,000 m	Hirofumi Otsuka	17:38.8	28
10,000 m	Yoshiaki Demachi	16:54.6	22

Women

Event	Athlete	Race	
Event	Athlete	Time	Rank
500 m	Sachiko Saito	DNF	–
500 m	Kaname Ide	50.0	27
500 m	Misae Takeda	49.4	25
1000 m	Sachiko Saito	1:41.0	26
1000 m	Misae Takeda	1:40.4	25
1500 m	Jitsuko Saito	2:36.6	26
1500 m	Kaname Ide	2:34.2	23
1500 m	Sachiko Saito	2:31.4	18
3000 m	Kaname Ide	5:27.9	21
3000 m	Jitsuko Saito	5:27.8	20
