= Speed skating at the 1968 Winter Olympics – Men's 1500 metres =

Speed skating at the Olympics

Men's 1500 metres speed skating at the X Olympic Winter Games
- Pictogram for speed skating
- Venue: L'Anneau de Vitesse
- Date: 16 February 1968
- Competitors: 53 from 18 nations
- Winning time: 2:03.4 OR

Medalists
1st place, gold medalist(s)		Kees Verkerk; Netherlands
2nd place, silver medalist(s)		Ivar Eriksen; Norway
2nd place, silver medalist(s)		Ard Schenk; Netherlands

The men's 1500 metres in speed skating at the 1968 Winter Olympics took place on 16 February, at the L'Anneau de Vitesse.

== Records ==
Prior to this competition, the existing world and Olympic records were as follows:

World record	Magne Thomassen (NOR)	2:02.5	Davos, Switzerland	5 February 1968
Olympic record	Yevgeny Grishin (URS); Yuri Mikhailov (URS)	2:08.6	Cortina d'Ampezzo, Italy	30 January 1956

The following new Olympic record was set.

Date	Athlete	Time	OR	WR
16 February	Kees Verkerk (NED)	2:03.4	OR	

== Results ==
Rank	Athlete	Country	Time	Notes
1st place, gold medalist(s)	Kees Verkerk	Netherlands	2:03.4	OR
2nd place, silver medalist(s)	Ivar Eriksen	Norway	2:05.0	
2nd place, silver medalist(s)	Ard Schenk	Netherlands	2:05.0	
4	Magne Thomassen	Norway	2:05.1	
5	Johnny Höglin	Sweden	2:05.2	
5	Bjørn Tveter	Norway	2:05.2	
7	Svein-Erik Stiansen	Norway	2:05.5	
8	Eduard Matusevich	Soviet Union	2:06.1	
9	Peter Nottet	Netherlands	2:06.3	
10	Örjan Sandler	Sweden	2:07.0	
11	Aleksandr Kerchenko	Soviet Union	2:07.1	
12	Ants Antson	Soviet Union	2:07.2	
12	Valery Kaplan	Soviet Union	2:07.2	
14	Jouko Launonen	Finland	2:07.5	
15	Günter Traub	West Germany	2:07.7	
16	Jan Bols	Netherlands	2:07.8	
16	Manne Lavås	Sweden	2:07.8	
18	Kimmo Koskinen	Finland	2:07.9	
19	Richard Wurster	United States	2:08.4	
20	Göran Claeson	Sweden	2:08.6	
21	Olavi Hjellman	Finland	2:10.1	
22	Jürgen Traub	West Germany	2:10.2	
23	Wayne LeBombard	United States	2:11.2	
24	Raimo Hietala	Finland	2:11.7	
24	Bill Lanigan	United States	2:11.7	
26	Bob Hodges	Canada	2:12.0	
27	György Martos	Hungary	2:12.2	
28	John Tipper	Great Britain	2:12.4	
29	György Ivánkai	Hungary	2:12.6	
30	Tadao Ishihata	Japan	2:12.7	
31	Keiichi Suzuki	Japan	2:13.1	
32	Giancarlo Gloder	Italy	2:13.2	
33	Elio Locatelli	Italy	2:13.3	
34	Roger Capan	United States	2:13.6	
34	Renato De Riva	Italy	2:13.6	
36	Michel Thépénier	France	2:13.7	
37	François Perrenoud	France	2:14.0	
38	Guido Gillarduzzi	Italy	2:14.1	
39	Otmar Braunecker	Austria	2:14.4	
40	Mutsuhiko Maeda	Japan	2:14.8	
40	Hermann Strutz	Austria	2:14.8	
40	Masaki Suzuki	Japan	2:14.8	
43	Geoff Stockdale	Great Britain	2:15.6	
44	Erich Korbel	Austria	2:15.7	
45	Mihály Martos	Hungary	2:15.8	
46	Pete Williamson	Canada	2:16.0	
47	Hansruedi Widmer	Switzerland	2:16.1	
48	Franz Krienbühl	Switzerland	2:16.3	
49	Colin Coates	Australia	2:16.7	
49	Luvsanlkhagvyn Dashnyam	Mongolia	2:16.7	
51	Lee Ik-hwan	South Korea	2:17.5	
52	Büjiin Jalbaa	Mongolia	2:18.0	
53	David Bodington	Great Britain	2:19.1	
