= Speed skating at the 1968 Winter Olympics – Women's 500 metres =

Women's 500 metres speed skating at the X Olympic Winter Games
- Pictogram for speed skating
- Venue: L'Anneau de Vitesse
- Date: 9 February 1968
- Competitors: 28 from 11 nations
- Winning time: 46.1

Medalists
1st place, gold medalist(s)		Lyudmila Titova	Soviet Union
2nd place, silver medalist(s)		Jenny Fish	United States
2nd place, silver medalist(s)		Dianne Holum	United States
2nd place, silver medalist(s)		Mary Meyers	United States

The women's 500 metres in speed skating at the 1968 Winter Olympics took place on 9 February, at the L'Anneau de Vitesse.

== Records ==
Prior to this competition, the existing world and Olympic records were as follows:

World record	Tatyana Sidorova (URS)	42.5	Davos, Switzerland	3 February 1968
Olympic record	Lidia Skoblikova (URS)	45.0	Innsbruck, Austria	30 January 1964

== Results ==
Rank	Athlete	Country	Time
1st place, gold medalist(s)	Lyudmila Titova	Soviet Union	46.1
2nd place, silver medalist(s)	Jenny Fish	United States	46.3
2nd place, silver medalist(s)	Dianne Holum	United States	46.3
2nd place, silver medalist(s)	Mary Meyers	United States	46.3
5	Ellie van den Brom	Netherlands	46.6
6	Kaija Mustonen	Finland	46.7
6	Sigrid Sundby-Dybedahl	Norway	46.7
8	Kirsti Biermann	Norway	46.8
9	Irina Yegorova	Soviet Union	46.9
9	Tatyana Sidorova	Soviet Union	46.9
11	Lisbeth Korsmo-Berg	Norway	47.0
12	Arja Kantola	Finland	47.4
12	Evi Sappl	West Germany	47.4
14	Stien Kaiser	Netherlands	47.6
15	Christina Lindblom-Scherling	Sweden	47.7
16	Wil Burgmeijer	Netherlands	47.8
16	Ruth Schleiermacher	East Germany	47.8
18	Kaija-Liisa Keskivitikka	Finland	48.1
19	Marie-Louise Perrenoud	France	48.2
19	Wendy Thompson	Canada	48.2
21	Hildegard Sellhuber	West Germany	48.4
22	Martine Ivangine	France	48.5
23	Marcia Parsons	Canada	48.8
24	Doreen McCannell	Canada	49.0
25	Misae Takeda	Japan	49.4
26	Ylva Hedlund	Sweden	49.9
27	Kaname Ide	Japan	50.0
-	Sachiko Saito	Japan	DNF
