= Speed skating at the 1968 Winter Olympics – Men's 500 metres =

Speed skating at the Olympics

Men's 500 metres speed skating at the X Olympic Winter Games
- Pictogram for speed skating
- Venue: L'Anneau de Vitesse
- Date: 14 February 1968
- Competitors: 48 from 17 nations
- Winning time: 40.3

Medalists
1st place, gold medalist(s)		Erhard Keller	West Germany
2nd place, silver medalist(s)		Terry McDermott	United States
2nd place, silver medalist(s)		Magne Thomassen	Norway

The men's 500 metres in speed skating at the 1968 Winter Olympics took place on 14 February, at the L'Anneau de Vitesse.

== Records ==
Prior to this competition, the existing world and Olympic records were as follows:

World record	Erhard Keller (FRG)	39.2	Inzell, West Germany	28 January 1968
Olympic record	Terry McDermott (USA)	40.1	Innsbruck, Austria	4 February 1964

== Results ==
Rank	Athlete	Country	Time
1st place, gold medalist(s)	Erhard Keller	West Germany	40.3
2nd place, silver medalist(s)	Terry McDermott	United States	40.5
2nd place, silver medalist(s)	Magne Thomassen	Norway	40.5
4	Yevgeny Grishin	Soviet Union	40.6
5	Neil Blatchford	United States	40.7
5	Arne Herjuaune	Norway	40.7
5	John Wurster	United States	40.7
8	Seppo Hänninen	Finland	40.8
8	Håkan Holmgren	Sweden	40.8
8	Keiichi Suzuki	Japan	40.8
11	Herbert Höfl	West Germany	41.0
11	Anatoly Lepyoshkin	Soviet Union	41.0
13	Roar Grønvold	Norway	41.1
13	Ard Schenk	Netherlands	41.1
15	Hasse Börjes	Sweden	41.2
15	Heike Hedlund	Sweden	41.2
15	Masaki Suzuki	Japan	41.2
18	Valery Muratov	Soviet Union	41.4
19	John Tipper	Great Britain	41.5
19	Gerd Zimmermann	West Germany	41.5
21	Tom Gray	United States	41.6
21	Valery Kaplan	Soviet Union	41.6
23	Kimmo Koskinen	Finland	41.7
24	Manne Lavås	Sweden	41.8
25	Bob Boucher	Canada	42.0
26	Otmar Braunecker	Austria	42.1
26	Elio Locatelli	Italy	42.1
26	Geoff Stockdale	Great Britain	42.1
29	Johan Lind	Norway	42.3
30	Peter Nottet	Netherlands	42.4
31	Mihály Martos	Hungary	42.5
31	Günter Traub	West Germany	42.5
33	Tamio Dejima	Japan	42.6
33	Jouko Launonen	Finland	42.6
33	Kees Verkerk	Netherlands	42.6
33	Pete Williamson	Canada	42.6
37	Takayuki Hida	Japan	42.9
38	Luvsanlkhagvyn Dashnyam	Mongolia	43.0
38	György Martos	Hungary	43.0
40	Olavi Hjellman	Finland	43.1
41	Colin Coates	Australia	43.3
41	Bob Hodges	Canada	43.3
43	Ruedi Uster	Switzerland	43.6
44	Hansruedi Widmer	Switzerland	43.7
45	Michel Thépénier	France	43.8
46	François Perrenoud	France	44.1
-	David Bodington	Great Britain	DNF
-	Jan Bols	Netherlands	DNF
