= Nordic combined at the 1968 Winter Olympics =

Nordic combined at the X Olympic Winter Games
- Venue: Autrans
- Dates: 10–12 February 1976
- Competitors: 41 from 13 nations
- Winning Score: 449.04

Medalists
1st place, gold medalist(s)		Franz Keller	West Germany
2nd place, silver medalist(s)		Alois Kälin	Switzerland
3rd place, bronze medalist(s)		Andreas Kunz	East Germany

Nordic combined at the 1968 Winter Olympics consisted of one event, held from 10 February to 12 February at Autrans.

== Medal summary ==
=== Medal table ===
Rank	Nation	Gold	Silver	Bronze	Total
1	West Germany	1	0	0	1
2	Switzerland	0	1	0	1
3	East Germany	0	0	1	1
Totals (3 entries)		1	1	1	3

=== Events ===
Event	Gold		Silver		Bronze	
Individual	Franz Keller; West Germany	449.04	Alois Kälin; Switzerland	447.99	Andreas Kunz; East Germany	444.10

== Individual ==
Athletes did three normal hill ski jumps, with the lowest score dropped. They then raced a 15 kilometre cross-country course, with the time converted to points. The athlete with the highest combined points score was awarded the gold medal.

Rank	Name	Country	Ski Jumping					Cross-country			Total
Rank	Name	Country	Jump 1	Jump 2	Jump 3	Total	Rank	Time	Points	Rank	Total
1st place, gold medalist(s)	Franz Keller	West Germany	118.1	122.0	~~81.3~~	240.1	1	50:45.2	208.94	13	449.04
2nd place, silver medalist(s)	Alois Kälin	Switzerland	~~73.1~~	97.8	95.4	193.2	24	47:21.5	254.79	1	447.99
3rd place, bronze medalist(s)	Andreas Kunz	East Germany	109.3	~~105.8~~	107.6	216.9	10	49:19.8	227.20	3	444.10
4	Tomáš Kučera	Czechoslovakia	109.2	108.2	~~102.6~~	217.4	9	50:07.7	216.74	6	434.14
5	Ezio Damolin	Italy	103.4	102.6	~~99.4~~	206.0	13	49:36.2	223.54	4	429.54
6	Józef Gąsienica	Poland	~~100.2~~	112.7	105.0	217.7	8	50:34.5	211.08	11	428.78
7	Robert Makara	Soviet Union	109.3	113.5	~~74.1~~	222.8	6	51:09.3	204.12	17	426.92
8	Vyacheslav Dryagin	Soviet Union	~~106.6~~	107.5	115.3	222.8	5	51:22.0	201.58	19	424.38
9	Roland Weißpflog	East Germany	94.6	~~90.1~~	91.7	186.3	29	48:33.5	238.00	2	424.30
10	Hiroshi Itagaki	Japan	~~78.7~~	115.4	122.0	237.4	2	53:26.2	177.25	29	414.65
11	Karl-Heinz Luck	East Germany	100.2	98.6	~~91.4~~	198.8	20	50:14.7	215.22	8	414.02
12	Tõnu Haljand	Soviet Union	101.0	101.8	~~89.4~~	202.8	17	50:40.5	209.88	12	412.68
13	John Bower	United States	104.2	101.0	~~99.4~~	205.2	14	51:00.1	205.96	16	411.16
14	Günther Naumann	West Germany	95.4	94.6	~~92.3~~	190.0	28	49:48.5	220.89	5	410.89
15	Józef Gąsienica Daniel	Poland	107.6	~~78.3~~	96.2	203.8	16	51:10.1	203.96	18	407.76
16	Ladislav Rygl	Czechoslovakia	~~97.1~~	100.2	100.2	200.4	19	50:55.5	206.88	14	407.28
17	Fabio Morandini	Italy	~~83.0~~	90.9	90.8	181.7	33	50:08.5	216.56	7	398.26
18	Erwin Fiedor	Poland	119.0	~~112.9~~	115.3	234.3	3	54:48.7	161.63	36	395.93
19	Mikhail Artyukhov	Soviet Union	94.6	97.8	~~90.7~~	192.4	26	51:32.4	199.50	20	391.90
20	Jan Kawulok	Poland	103.4	97.0	~~95.7~~	200.4	18	52:32.7	187.51	25	387.91
21	Mikkel Dobloug	Norway	~~94.6~~	97.8	~~94.6~~	192.4	27	51:55.8	194.82	21	387.22
22	Georg Krog	United States	105.4	106.8	~~100.2~~	212.2	11	53:55.9	171.56	33	383.76
23	Akemi Taniguchi	Japan	114.4	110.0	~~109.1~~	224.4	4	55:04.5	158.74	39	383.14
24	Katsutoshi Okubo	Japan	96.2	98.6	~~90.1~~	194.8	23	52:33.1	187.43	26	382.23
25	Alfred Winkler	West Germany	~~88.9~~	98.6	94.2	192.8	25	52:26.0	188.79	24	381.59
26	Jim Miller	United States	~~70.5~~	85.1	86.5	171.6	35	50:56.0	206.78	15	378.38
27	Markus Svendsen	Norway	~~98.6~~	105.0	105.8	210.8	12	54:19.4	167.05	35	377.85
28	Kåre Olav Berg	Norway	104.2	100.2	~~95.4~~	204.4	15	53:57.8	171.20	34	375.60
29	Hans Rudhardt	West Germany	96.7	~~95.7~~	98.7	195.4	22	53:15.3	179.34	28	374.74
30	Ilpo Nuolikivi	Finland	~~87.2~~	90.9	~~87.2~~	178.1	34	52:39.6	186.18	27	364.28
31	Masatoshi Suto	Japan	87.3	95.7	~~72.2~~	183.0	30	53:32.6	176.03	31	359.03
32	Ulli Öhlböck	Austria	~~76.0~~	83.7	85.1	168.8	36	52:23.9	189.20	23	358.00
33	Esa Klinga	Finland	~~80.2~~	86.5	~~80.2~~	166.7	37	52:19.7	190.04	22	356.74
34	Waldemar Heigenhauser	Austria	101.8	95.4	~~92.7~~	197.2	21	55:00.4	159.49	38	356.69
35	Helmut Voggenberger	Austria	95.4	86.5	~~84.4~~	181.9	32	54:57.2	160.07	37	341.97
36	Raimo Majuri	Finland	82.3	79.5	~~76.7~~	161.8	38	53:30.2	176.48	30	338.28
37	Émile Salvi	France	77.7	80.9	~~76.2~~	158.6	39	53:44.3	173.78	32	332.38
38	Jean-Marie Bourgeois	France	56.0	~~35.6~~	55.4	111.4	40	50:18.0	214.50	9	325.90
39	Tom Upham	United States	~~80.9~~	92.2	90.0	182.2	31	56:30.5	142.97	40	325.17
40	Gjert Andersen	Norway	116.2	~~99.4~~	105.0	221.2	7	0:28.0	102.49	41	323.69
41	Gervais Poirot	France	~~49.4~~	51.2	51.2	102.4	41	50:22.2	213.58	10	315.98

== Participating NOCs ==
Thirteen nations participated in Nordic combined at the Grenoble Games.

- Austria (3)
- Finland (3)
- France (3)
- West Germany (4)
- East Germany (3)
- Italy (2)
- Japan (4)
- Norway (4)
- Poland (4)
- Switzerland (1)
- Czechoslovakia (2)
- Soviet Union (4)
- United States (4)
