= Esa (name) =

Esa is a masculine given name of Finnish origin and a surname. Notable people with the name include:

== Given name ==
- Esa of Bernicia (r. c. 500 – c. 520), semi-historical king of Bernicia

=== A–N ===
- Esa Åkerlund (born 1969), convicted Finnish serial killer
- Esa Hietanen (1896–1962), Finnish journalist and politician
- Esa Holopainen (born 1972), Finnish guitarist for Amorphis
- Esa Itkonen (born 1944), Finnish linguist, philosopher and academic
- Esa Jokinen (born 1958), Finnish athlete
- Esa Kaitila (1909–1975), Finnish academic and politician
- Esa Keskinen (born 1965), Finnish ice hockey player
- Esa Klinga (born 1939), Finnish skier
- Esa Lehikoinen (born 1986), Finnish ice hockey player
- Esa Lepola (born 1948), Finnish swimmer
- Esa Lindell (born 1994), Finnish ice hockey player
- Esa Misri (born 1971), Indian bodybuilder
- Esa Murtoaro (born 1966), Finnish wrestler

=== O–Z ===
- Esa Pakarinen (1911–1989), Finnish actor and musician
- Esa Pakarinen Jr. (1947-2026), Finnish actor
- Esa Pekonen (born 1961), Finnish football player and manager
- Esa Peltonen (born 1947), Finnish ice hockey player
- Esa Piironen (born 1943), Finnish architect
- Esa Pirnes (born 1977), Finnish ice hockey player
- Esa Pole (born 2001), American football player
- Esa Pulkkinen (born 1957), Finnish army officer
- Esa Rinne (born 1943), Finnish athlete
- Esa Saarinen (born 1953), Finnish philosopher and academic
- Esa Saario (1931–2025), Finnish actor
- Esa-Pekka Salonen (born 1958), Finnish orchestral conductor and composer
- Esa Seeste (1913–1997), Finnish gymnast
- Esa Skyttä, Finnish racing cyclist
- Esa Tapani (born 1968), Finnish musician
- Esa Terävä (born 1987), Finnish football player
- Esa Tikkanen (born 1965), Finnish ice hockey player
- Esa Utriainen (born 1953), Finnish javelin thrower
- Esa Vuorinen (born 1945), Finnish cinematographer

== Surname ==
- Lou Esa (born 1952), American boxer
