= Luge at the 1968 Winter Olympics – Women's singles =

Women's singles at the X Olympic Winter Games
- Venue: Villard-de-Lans
- Dates: 11–13 February 1968
- Competitors: 26 from 10 nations
- Winning time: 2:28.66

Medalists
1st place, gold medalist(s)		Erika Lechner	Italy
2nd place, silver medalist(s)		Christa Schmuck	West Germany
3rd place, bronze medalist(s)		Angelika Dünhaupt	West Germany

The Women's singles luge competition at the 1968 Winter Olympics in Grenoble was held from 11 to 13 February, at Villard-de-Lans.

After three runs, there were three East German racers Ortrun Enderlein, Anna-Maria Müller and Angela Knösel in the top 4, but they were disqualified when the FIL determined that they had been heating their runners, a banned practice. Italian Erika Lechner, third after three runs, was moved into first place, and won gold after the fourth run was cancelled due to bad weather.

West German media alleged race fixing, while GDR sports officials blamed the West German Luge Association for staging the incident. According to Stasi documents which came to light in 2006, the FIL official who made the decision had allegedly been bribed by the Federal Republic of Germany and Austria to make the allegation. The question of whether the GDR lugers really cheated remains unresolved, with some contemporary media in Germany maintaining that the GDR team were unfairly disqualified.

== Results ==
Rank	Athlete	Country	Run 1	Run 2	Run 3	Total
1st place, gold medalist(s)	Erika Lechner	Italy	48.76	49.39	50.51	2:28.66
2nd place, silver medalist(s)	Christa Schmuck	West Germany	49.15	49.84	50.38	2:29.37
3rd place, bronze medalist(s)	Angelika Dünhaupt	West Germany	49.34	49.88	50.34	2:29.56
4	Helena Macher	Poland	49.55	50.02	50.48	2:30.05
5	Jadwiga Damse	Poland	49.64	50.43	50.08	2:30.15
6	Dana Beldová-Spálenská	Czechoslovakia	49.22	50.36	50.77	2:30.35
7	Anna Mąka	Poland	49.69	50.05	50.66	2:30.40
8	Ute Gähler	West Germany	49.78	49.93	50.71	2:30.42
9	Leni Thurner	Austria	49.64	50.15	50.71	2:30.50
10	Marlene Korthals	Austria	49.72	50.31	51.30	2:31.33
11	Olina Hátlová-Tylová	Czechoslovakia	50.16	50.35	51.14	2:31.65
12	Linda Crutchfield-Bocock	Canada	50.64	50.54	51.28	2:32.46
13	Berit Salomonsson	Sweden	50.89	51.35	51.31	2:33.55
14	Kathleen Ann Roberts-Homstad	United States	50.62	51.04	51.94	2:33.60
15	Elfriede Wäger	Austria	51.93	50.44	52.04	2:34.41
16	Ellen Williams	United States	51.67	51.09	52.39	2:35.15
17	Sheila Johansen	United States	51.21	51.90	52.36	2:35.47
18	Martha Diplock	Canada	51.94	51.51	52.03	2:35.48
19	Sylvette Grassi	France	51.85	52.08	52.55	2:36.48
20	Jacqueline Barasinski	France	51.96	52.39	52.44	2:36.79
21	Erica Prugger	Italy	61.90	50.91	51.40	2:44.21
-	Ortrun Enderlein	East Germany	48.74	49.34	49.96	DQ
-	Anna-Maria Müller	East Germany	48.88	49.26	49.92	DQ
-	Angela Knösel	East Germany	49.12	49.65	50.16	DQ
-	Cristina Pabst	Italy	?	DNF	-	-
-	Phyllis Walter	Canada	DQ	-	-	-
