= Finland at the 1968 Winter Olympics =

- IOC code: FIN
- NOC: Finnish Olympic Committee
- Website: sport.fi/olympiakomitea (in Finnish and Swedish)

in Grenoble
- Competitors: 52 (44 men, 8 women) in 7 sports
- Flag bearers: Veikko Kankkonen, Ski Jumping
- Medals Ranked 10th: Gold 1 Silver 2 Bronze 2 Total 5

Winter Olympics appearances (overview)
- 1924; 1928; 1932; 1936; 1948; 1952; 1956; 1960; 1964; 1968; 1972; 1976; 1980; 1984; 1988; 1992; 1994; 1998; 2002; 2006; 2010; 2014; 2018; 2022; 2026

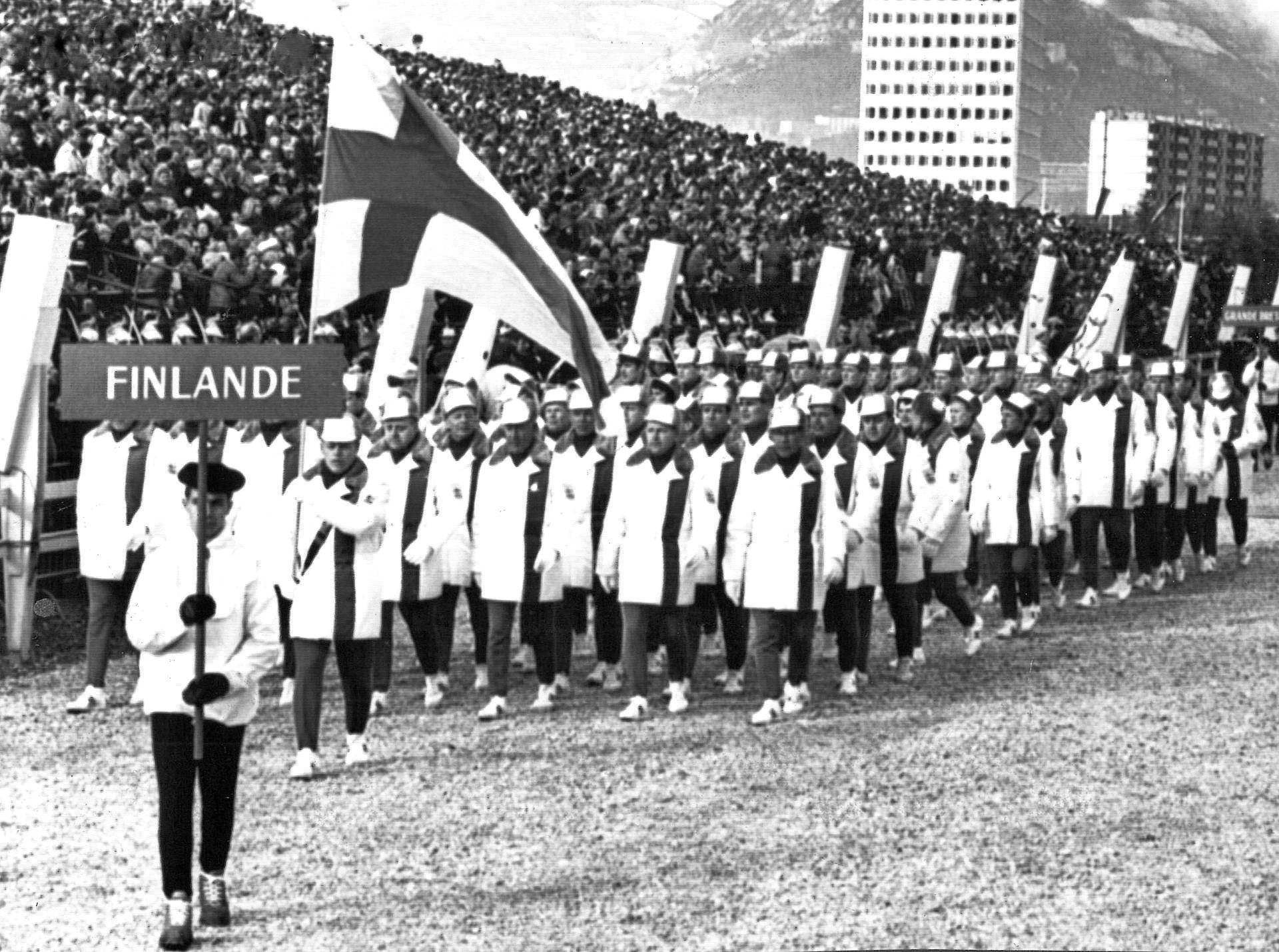
Finnish Olympic team on the opening day

Finland competed at the 1968 Winter Olympics in Grenoble, France.

== Medalists ==
| Medal | Name | Sport | Event |
|---|---|---|---|
| Gold | Kaija Mustonen | Speed skating | Women's 1500m |
| Silver | Eero Mäntyranta | Cross-country skiing | Men's 15 km |
| Silver | Kaija Mustonen | Speed skating | Women's 3000m |
| Bronze | Eero Mäntyranta | Cross-country skiing | Men's 30 km |
| Bronze | Kalevi Laurila; Eero Mäntyranta; Kalevi Oikarainen; Hannu Taipale | Cross-country skiing | Men's 4 × 10 km relay |

== Alpine skiing ==
Men

| Athlete | Event | Race 1 | | Race 2 | | Total | |
| Athlete | Event | Time | Rank | Time | Rank | Time | Rank |
|---|---|---|---|---|---|---|---|
| Raimo Manninen | Downhill | | | | | DSQ | – |
| Ulf Ekstam | Downhill | | | | | 2:06.14 | 30 |
| Ulf Ekstam | Giant Slalom | 1:53.09 | 45 | 1:52.66 | 36 | 3:45.75 | 36 |
| Raimo Manninen | Giant Slalom | 1:49.92 | 34 | 1:52.11 | 34 | 3:42.03 | 30 |

Men's slalom

| Athlete | Heat 1 | | Heat 2 | | Final | | | | | |
| Athlete | Time | Rank | Time | Rank | Time 1 | Rank | Time 2 | Rank | Total | Rank |
|---|---|---|---|---|---|---|---|---|---|---|
| Raimo Manninen | DNF | – | did not advance | | | | | | | |
| Ulf Ekstam | 54.79 | 3 | 55.44 | 1 QF | 52.66 | 29 | 52.26 | 17 | 1:44.92 | 18 |

== Biathlon ==
Men

| Event | Athlete | Time | Penalties | Adjusted time ^{1} | Rank |
|---|---|---|---|---|---|
| 20 km | Mauno Luukkonen | 1'19:15.8 | 9 | 1'28:18.8 | 31 |
| 20 km | Yrjö Salpakari | 1'20:11.6 | 7 | 1'27:11.6 | 25 |
| 20 km | Kalevi Vähäkylä | 1'17:56.5 | 3 | 1'20:56.5 | 9 |
| 20 km | Arvo Kinnari | 1'17:47.9 | 2 | 1'19:47.9 | 5 |

^{1} One minute added per close miss (a hit in the outer ring), two minutes added per complete miss.

Men's 4 x 7.5 km relay

| Athletes | Race | | |
| Athletes | Misses ^{2} | Time | Rank |
|---|---|---|---|
| Juhani Suutarinen; Heikki Flöjt; Kalevi Vähäkylä; Arvo Kinnari | 5 | 2'20:41.8 | 5 |

^{2} A penalty loop of 200 metres had to be skied per missed target.

== Cross-country skiing ==
Men

| Event | Athlete | Race | |
| Event | Athlete | Time | Rank |
|---|---|---|---|
| 15 km | Hannu Taipale | DNF | – |
| 15 km | Kalevi Oikarainen | 49:11.1 | 10 |
| 15 km | Kalevi Laurila | 48:37.6 | 4 |
| 15 km | Eero Mäntyranta | 47:46.1 | 2nd place, silver medalist(s) |
| 30 km | Arto Tiainen | 1'38:51.1 | 16 |
| 30 km | Kalevi Oikarainen | 1'37:34.4 | 7 |
| 30 km | Kalevi Laurila | 1'37:29.8 | 6 |
| 30 km | Eero Mäntyranta | 1'36:55.3 | 3rd place, bronze medalist(s) |
| 50 km | Pauli Siitonen | 2'34:31.2 | 19 |
| 50 km | Eero Mäntyranta | 2'32:53.8 | 15 |
| 50 km | Hannu Taipale | 2'32:37.7 | 14 |
| 50 km | Kalevi Laurila | 2'31:24.9 | 11 |

Men's 4 × 10 km relay

| Athletes | Race | |
| Athletes | Time | Rank |
|---|---|---|
| Kalevi Oikarainen; Hannu Taipale; Kalevi Laurila; Eero Mäntyranta | 2'10:56.7 | 3rd place, bronze medalist(s) |

Women

| Event | Athlete | Race | |
| Event | Athlete | Time | Rank |
|---|---|---|---|
| 5 km | Helena Kivioja | 17:46.2 | 22 |
| 5 km | Marjatta Olkkonen | 17:12.4 | 11 |
| 5 km | Senja Pusula | 17:00.3 | 8 |
| 5 km | Marjatta Kajosmaa | 16:54.6 | 5 |
| 10 km | Helena Kivioja | DNF | – |
| 10 km | Liisa Suihkonen | 39:55.3 | 18 |
| 10 km | Senja Pusula | 39:12.5 | 12 |
| 10 km | Marjatta Kajosmaa | 38:09.0 | 5 |

Women's 3 x 5 km relay

| Athletes | Race | |
| Athletes | Time | Rank |
|---|---|---|
| Senja Pusula; Marjatta Olkkonen; Marjatta Kajosmaa | 58:45.1 | 4 |

== Ice hockey ==
=== First round ===
Finland - (Socialist Federal Republic of Yugoslavia) Yugoslavia 11:2 (3:0, 6:0, 2:2)
Goalscorers: Lasse Oksanen 2, Esa Peltonen 2, Matti Reunamaki 2, Juhani Wahlsten, Veli-Pekka Ketola, Matti Keinonen, Matti Harju, Pekka Leimu - Albin Felc, Franc Smolej.

=== Final Round ===
| Rank | Team | Pld | W | L | T | GF | GA | Pts |
|---|---|---|---|---|---|---|---|---|
| 1 | Soviet Union | 7 | 6 | 1 | 0 | 48 | 10 | 12 |
| 2 | Czechoslovakia | 7 | 5 | 1 | 1 | 33 | 17 | 11 |
| 3 | Canada | 7 | 5 | 2 | 0 | 28 | 15 | 10 |
| 4 | Sweden | 7 | 4 | 2 | 1 | 23 | 18 | 9 |
| 5 | Finland | 7 | 3 | 3 | 1 | 17 | 23 | 7 |
| 6 | United States | 7 | 2 | 4 | 1 | 23 | 28 | 5 |
| 7 | West Germany | 7 | 1 | 6 | 0 | 13 | 39 | 2 |
| 8 | East Germany | 7 | 0 | 7 | 0 | 13 | 48 | 0 |

(Soviet Union) USSR – Finland 8:0 (3:0, 2:0, 3:0)
Goalscorers: Staršinov 2, Mišakov 2, Zimin 2, Firsov, Populanov.
Referees: Bucala, Kořínek (TCH)

Canada – Finland 2:5 (1:2, 0:1, 1:2)
Goalscorers: O'Shea, McMillan – Keinonen, Oksanen, J. Peltonen, Koskela, Wahlsten.
Referees: Trumble (USA), Seglin (URS)

Czechoslovakia – Finland 4:3 (0:1, 3:0, 1:2)
Goalscorers: Nedomanský 2, Golonka, Havel – Keinonen, Ketola, Oksanen.
Referees: Wiking (SWE), Snětkov (URS)

Sweden – Finland 5:1 (1:0, 2:1, 2:0)
Goalscorers: Wickberg 2, Granholm, Nillsson, Bengsston – Oksanen.
Referees: Kubinec (CAN), Kořínek (TCH)

East Germany – Finland 2:3 (1:2, 0:1, 1:0)
Goalscorers: R. Noack, Peters – Harju 2, Keinonen.
Referees: Bucala (TCH), Dahlberg (SWE)

Finland– West Germany 4:1 (2:1, 1:0, 1:0)
Goalscorers: Leimu 2, Ketola, J. Peltonen – Schloder.
Referees: Kořínek, Bucala (TCH)

(United States) USA – Finland 1:1 (1:1, 0:0, 0:0)
Goalscorers: Volmar – Wahlsten.
Referees: Kubinec (CAN), Seglin (URS)

=== Contestants ===
- Team Roster
  - Urpo Ylönen
  - Ilpo Koskela
  - Paavo Tirkkonen
  - Juha Rantasila
  - Pekka Kuusisto
  - Lalli Partinen
  - Seppo Lindström
  - Matti Reunamäki
  - Juhani Wahlsten
  - Matti Keinonen
  - Lasse Oksanen
  - Jorma Peltonen
  - Esa Peltonen
  - Kari Johansson
  - Veli-Pekka Ketola
  - Matti Harju
  - Pekka Leimu

== Nordic combined ==
Events:

- normal hill ski jumping (Three jumps, best two counted and shown here.)
- 15 km cross-country skiing

| Athlete | Event | Ski Jumping | | | | Cross-country | | | Total | |
| Athlete | Event | Distance 1 | Distance 2 | Points | Rank | Time | Points | Rank | Points | Rank |
|---|---|---|---|---|---|---|---|---|---|---|
| Raimo Majuri | Individual | 60.5 | 61.5 | 161.8 | 38 | 53:30.2 | 176.48 | 30 | 338.28 | 36 |
| Esa Klinga | Individual | 64.0 | 62.0 | 166.7 | 37 | 52:19.7 | 190.04 | 22 | 356.74 | 33 |
| Ilpo Nuolikivi | Individual | 66.0 | 67.0 | 178.1 | 34 | 52:39.6 | 186.18 | 27 | 364.28 | 30 |

== Ski jumping ==
| Athlete | Event | Jump 1 | | Jump 2 | | Total | |
| Athlete | Event | Distance | Points | Distance | Points | Points | Rank |
|---|---|---|---|---|---|---|---|
| Juhani Ruotsalainen | Normal hill | 70.0 | 92.3 | 68.0 | 92.1 | 184.4 | 39 |
| Heikki Väisänen | Normal hill | 68.5 | 92.4 | 63.5 | 78.4 | 170.8 | 45 |
| Veikko Kankkonen | Normal hill | 76.0 | 105.9 | 71.5 | 99.2 | 205.1 | 17 |
| Topi Mattila | Normal hill | 78.0 | 111.1 | 72.5 | 100.8 | 211.9 | 5 |
| Topi Mattila | Large hill | 85.0 (fall) | 56.4 | 90.5 | 94.1 | 150.5 | 49 |
| Juhani Ruotsalainen | Large hill | 78.0 | 71.6 | 80.5 | 77.6 | 149.2 | 50 |
| Seppo Reijonen | Large hill | 87.0 | 84.7 | 85.0 | 85.4 | 170.1 | 40 |
| Veikko Kankkonen | Large hill | 89.5 | 94.2 | 89.5 | 94.7 | 188.9 | 24 |

== Speed skating ==
Men

| Event | Athlete | Race | |
| Event | Athlete | Time | Rank |
|---|---|---|---|
| 500 m | Olavi Hjellman | 43.1 | 40 |
| 500 m | Jouko Launonen | 42.6 | 33 |
| 500 m | Kimmo Koskinen | 41.7 | 23 |
| 500 m | Seppo Hänninen | 40.8 | 8 |
| 1500 m | Raimo Hietala | 2:11.7 | 24 |
| 1500 m | Olavi Hjellman | 2:10.1 | 21 |
| 1500 m | Kimmo Koskinen | 2:07.9 | 18 |
| 1500 m | Jouko Launonen | 2:07.5 | 14 |
| 5000 m | Raimo Hietala | 7:54.0 | 17 |
| 5000 m | Jouko Launonen | 7:46.5 | 15 |
| 5000 m | Kimmo Koskinen | 7:35.9 | 9 |
| 10,000 m | Raimo Hietala | 16:45.9 | 20 |
| 10,000 m | Kimmo Koskinen | 16:15.7 | 14 |
| 10,000 m | Jouko Launonen | 16:02.1 | 12 |

Women

| Event | Athlete | Race | |
| Event | Athlete | Time | Rank |
|---|---|---|---|
| 500 m | Kaija-Liisa Keskivitikka | 48.1 | 18 |
| 500 m | Arja Kantola | 47.4 | 12 |
| 500 m | Kaija Mustonen | 46.7 | 6 |
| 1000 m | Arja Kantola | 1:37.9 | 22 |
| 1000 m | Kaija-Liisa Keskivitikka | 1:34.8 | 8 |
| 1000 m | Kaija Mustonen | 1:33.6 | 4 |
| 1500 m | Arja Kantola | 2:33.2 | 22 |
| 1500 m | Kaija-Liisa Keskivitikka | 2:25.8 | 6 |
| 1500 m | Kaija Mustonen | 2:22.4 OR | 1st place, gold medalist(s) |
| 3000 m | Arja Kantola | 5:30.7 | 24 |
| 3000 m | Kaija-Liisa Keskivitikka | 5:03.9 | 4 |
| 3000 m | Kaija Mustonen | 5:01.0 | 2nd place, silver medalist(s) |
