= Kawulok =

Kawulok is a Polish surname. Notable people with the surname include:

- Jan Kawulok (1946–2021), Polish Nordic combined skier
- Stanisław Kawulok (born 1953), Polish Nordic combined skier
