= 1968 Winter Olympics medal table =

1968 Winter Olympics medals
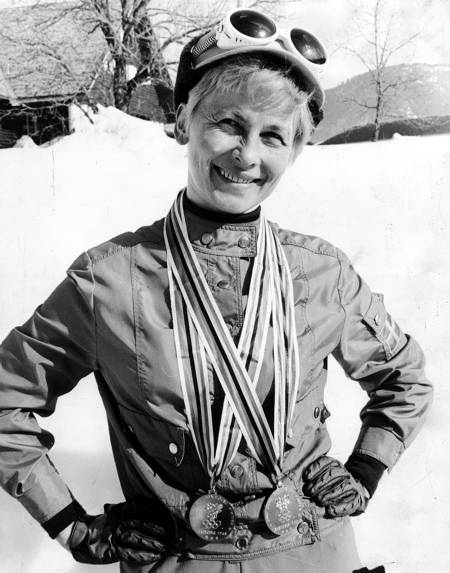
- Swedish cross-country skier Toini Gustafsson won three medals (two gold, one silver) at the 1968 Winter Olympics, tied for the most of any competing athlete.
- Location: Grenoble, France

Highlights
- Most gold medals: Norway (6)
- Most total medals: Norway (14)
- Medalling NOCs: 15

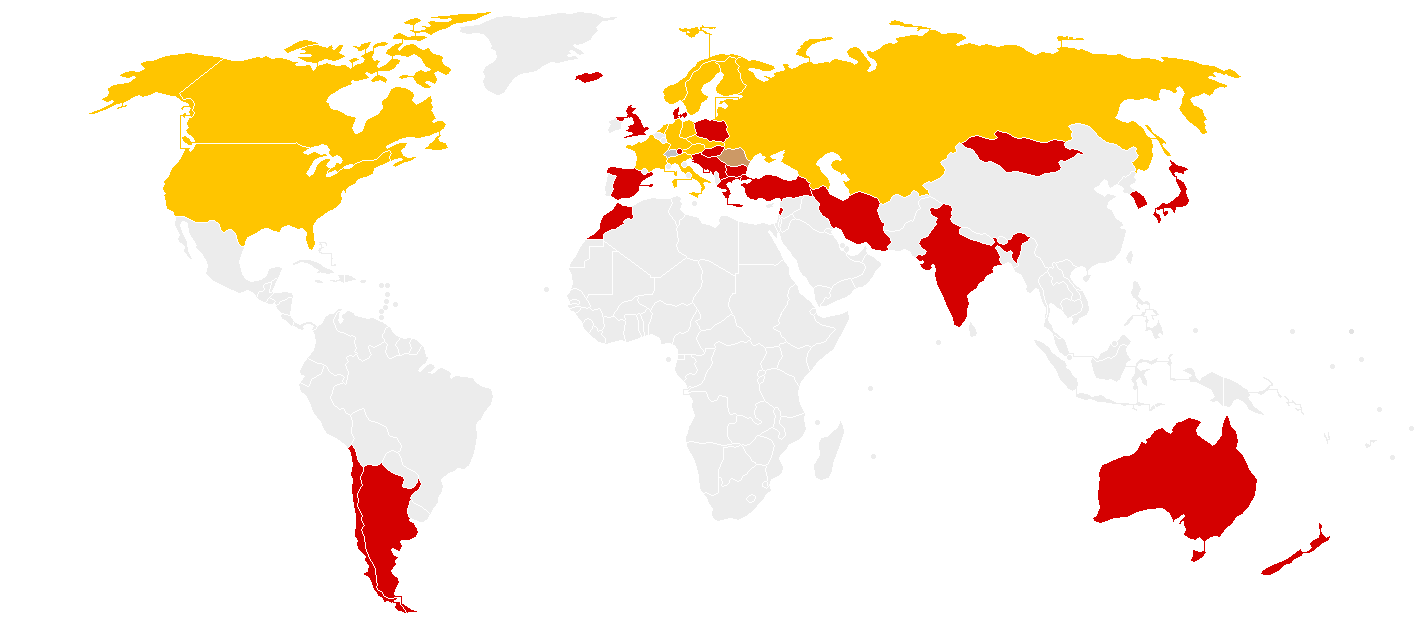
1968 Winter Olympic Games Medals map Legend: Gold represents countries that won at least one gold medal Silver represents countries that won at least one silver medal Bronze represents countries that won at least one bronze medal Red represents countries that did not win any medals Grey represents countries that did not participate

The 1968 Winter Olympics, officially known as the X Olympic Winter Games, were an international winter multi-sport event held in Grenoble, France, from 4 to 18 February 1968. A total of 1,158 athletes representing 37 National Olympic Committees (NOCs) participated. This included first-time entrant Morocco, as well as East and West Germany, who entered separate teams for the first time. The games featured 35 events in 6 sports and 10 disciplines, including the team relay event in the biathlon, which was contested for the first time.

Athletes representing 15 NOCs won at least one medal, with 13 winning at least one gold medal. Norway won the most medals overall, with 14, and the most gold medals, with 6. East and West Germany won their first Winter Olympic medals of any kind as independent teams, as did Romania, while East and West Germany, along with Czechoslovakia, won their first Winter Olympic gold medals. Among individual participants, French alpine skier Jean-Claude Killy won the most gold medals with three. Killy (three gold), Swedish cross-country skier Toini Gustafsson (two gold, one silver), and Finnish cross-country skier Eero Mäntyranta (one silver, two bronze) tied for the most medals overall, with three each.

== Medal table ==
The medal table is based on information provided by the International Olympic Committee (IOC) and is consistent with IOC conventional sorting in its published medal tables. The table uses the Olympic medal table sorting method. By default, the table is ordered by the number of gold medals the athletes from a nation have won, where a nation is an entity represented by an NOC. The number of silver medals is taken into consideration next and then the number of bronze medals. If teams are still tied, equal ranking is given and they are listed alphabetically by their IOC country code.

At the 1968 Winter Games, in speed skating, two-way ties for second place in the men's 500 and 1,500 metres events, as well as a three-way tie in the women's 500 metres event, resulted in the awarding of an additional four silver medals; as a consequence, three bronze medals were not awarded.

* Host nation (France)

1968 Winter Olympics medal table
Rank	NOC	Gold	Silver	Bronze	Total
1	Norway	6	6	2	14
2	Soviet Union	5	5	3	13
3	France*	4	3	2	9
4	Italy	4	0	0	4
5	Austria	3	4	4	11
6	Netherlands	3	3	3	9
7	Sweden	3	2	3	8
8	West Germany	2	2	3	7
9	United States	1	5	1	7
10	East Germany	1	2	2	5
10	Finland	1	2	2	5
12	Czechoslovakia	1	2	1	4
13	Canada	1	1	1	3
14	Switzerland	0	2	4	6
15	Romania	0	0	1	1
Totals (15 entries)		35	39	32	106

== See also ==
- List of 1968 Winter Olympics medal winners
- All-time Olympic Games medal table
- 1968 Summer Olympics medal table
