= Bill Spencer (biathlete) =

American biathlete (1936–2020)

William Allen Spencer (June 23, 1936 – December 3, 2020) competed in the 1964 and 1968 Winter Olympics on the United States Biathlon Team. Bill Spencer died on Thursday, December 3, 2020. He was 84 years old.

== Early life ==
Spencer was born in Russellville, Alabama. His family later moved to Salt Lake City where he attended South High School. He was a 1959 Collegiate All-American skier at the University of Utah where he was also a member of Sigma Pi fraternity. He graduated from Utah in 1961 and served in the U.S. Army from 1963 to 1984, retiring as a Lieutenant Colonel.

From 1963 to 1968, he was assigned to Ft. Richardson in Alaska with his wife Judy, a son and two daughters. He completed two tours of duty in the Vietnam War as an infantry officer, earning three Bronze Star Medals (one with Valor), three Air Medals (one with Valor), and three Army Commendation Medals.

== As an athlete ==
=== National Championships ===
Spencer won both the U.S. Biathlon Championships and the Canadian Biathlon Championships in 1966 and 1967. He was U.S. National 30 km Cross-Country Champion in 1965. He was a member of the U.S. CISM (Council International Sports Military) team 1964 to 1968 and 1973.

=== Olympics ===
Spencer competed in one event at the 1964 games. He finished 30th in the men's individual 20 km race. This was good for second best on the American team.

In the 1968 games Spencer competed as an individual and as part of the Men's 4 x 7.5 km relay. He finished 37th in the individual 20 km event (the second best of the U.S. squad) and the team finished eighth in the relay (out of fourteen teams).

== As a coach and official ==
After retiring from competition Spencer spent time as a coach and official. He was the U.S. biathlon team leader for the 1972 and 1984 Winter Olympics as well as numerous World Cups and World Championships. He was the U.S. Olympic shooting coach for the 1976, 1980, and 1992 Winter Olympics.

Spencer was the Coordinator of the National Guard Bureau Biathlon Program from 1977 to 1984. From 1984 to 1994 he was the U.S. Biathlon Association Coach and Development Coordinator.

From 1973 - 2002 he was the U.S. representative to the International Biathlon Union (IBU) Technical Committee, serving as Technical Delegate for the Calgary Olympics in 1988. At the 2002 Olympics he was Deputy Chief of Competition for the Biathlon.

At the 2002 Olympics, he carried the Olympic torch off of the plane, along with Nikki Stone, that had brought it to the U.S. from Greece.

He is the grandfather of U.S. Olympic rower Molly Reckford.

== Awards ==
- 1966 - Sports Illustrated Award of Merit
- 2000 - Inducted into the U.S. Biathlon Hall of Fame
- 2002 - IBU Medal of Honor
- 2003 – Inducted into the Utah Sports Hall of Fame
- 2004 - Inducted into the Intermountain Ski Hall of Fame
- 2005 – Inducted into the University of Utah's Crimson Club Hall of Fame
