= Jitsuko =

- Gender: Female

Origin
- Origin: Japanese
- Meaning: Different meanings depending on the kanji used

Jitsuko (written: 実子) is a feminine Japanese given name. Notable people with the name include:

- Jitsuko Saito (斎藤 実子) (born 1946), Japanese speed skater
- Jitsuko Yoshimura (吉村 実子) (born 1943), Japanese actress
