= Dünhaupt =

Dünhaupt or Dünnhaupt is a German surname. Notable people with the surname include:

- Angelika Dünhaupt (born 1946), German luger
- Gerhard Dünnhaupt (1927–2024), German bibliographer, literary historian, and professor
