= Majuri (surname) =

Majuri is a surname. Notable people with the surname include:

- Raimo Majuri (born 1943), Finnish skier
- Susanna Majuri (1978–2020), Finnish fine art photographer
- Tauno Majuri (1907–1980), Finnish stage and film actor
- Andrew Majuri (born 1993), Italian rapper
