= Lehikoinen =

Lehikoinen is a Finnish surname. Notable people with the surname include:

- Pertti Lehikoinen (born 1952), Finnish grandmaster of correspondence chess
- Matti Lehikoinen (born 1984), Finland's leading downhill cyclist
- Esa Lehikoinen (born 1986), Finnish professional ice hockey defenceman
- Kasper Lehikoinen (born 1992), Finnish badminton player
