= Mikkel Dobloug =

Mikkel Dobloug may refer to:

- Mikkel Dobloug (politician) (1844–1913), Norwegian wholesaler and politician
- Mikkel Dobloug (skier) (born 1944), Norwegian Nordic combined skier
