= Anna Mąka =

Anna Mąka may refer to:

- Anna Mąka (luger)
- Anna Mąka (biathlete)
