= Georg Krog =

Georg Krog may refer to:

- Georg Krog (speed skater)
- Georg Krog (skier)
