= Mutsuhiko =

- Gender: Male

Origin
- Origin: Japanese
- Meaning: Different meanings depending on the kanji used

Mutsuhiko (written: 六彦 or 睦彦) is a masculine Japanese given name. Notable people with the name include:

- Mutsuhiko Maeda (前田 睦彦; born 1947), Japanese speed skater
- Mutsuhiko Nomura (野村 六彦; born 1940), Japanese footballer and manager
