= Berit Salomonsson =

Swedish luger

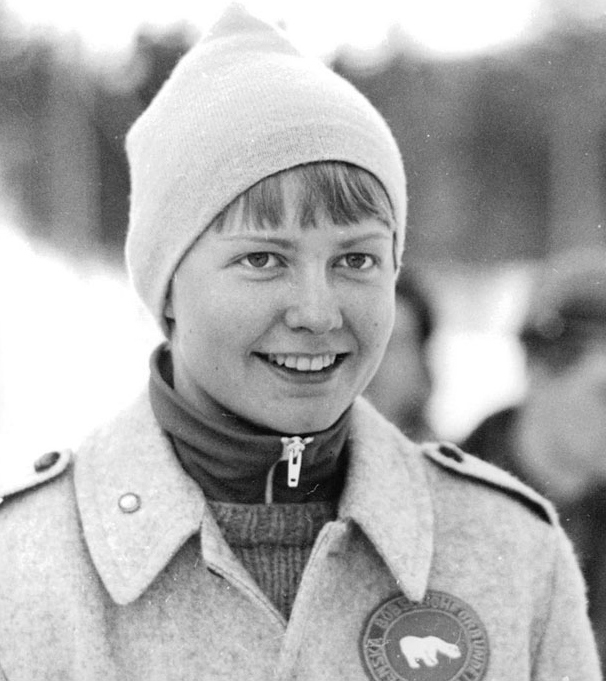

Personal information
- Nationality: Swedish
- Born: 2 August 1951 (age 73); Hammarstrand, Sweden
- Height: 165 cm (5 ft 5 in)
- Weight: 61 kg (134 lb)

Sport
- Sport: Luge
- Club: Arta BK, Hammarstrand

Anna Berit Salomonsson (married name Wahlberg, born 2 August 1951) is a retired Swedish luger. She placed 13th in the singles event at the 1968 Winter Olympics.
