= Aleksandr Kerchenko =

Soviet speed skater

Personal information
- Nationality: Soviet
- Born: 23 April 1946 (age 78); Omsk, Russian SFSR, Soviet Union

Sport
- Sport: Speed skating

Aleksandr Kerchenko (born 23 April 1946) is a Soviet speed skater. He competed in the men's 1500 metres event at the 1968 Winter Olympics.
