= Luge at the 1968 Winter Olympics =

Luge at the X Olympic Winter Games
- Venue: Villard-de-Lans
- Dates: 11–18 February 1968
- Competitors: 85 from 14 nations

Luge at the 1968 Winter Olympics consisted of three events at Villard-de-Lans. The competition took place between 11 and 18 February 1968.

== Medal summary ==
=== Medal table ===
Rank	Nation	Gold	Silver	Bronze	Total
1	East Germany	1	1	1	3
2	Austria	1	1	0	2
3	Italy	1	0	0	1
4	West Germany	0	1	2	3
Totals (4 entries)		3	3	3	9

East Germany led the medal table with three medals, one of each type. This was the first separate Games for East and West Germany, and thus each country's first luge medals.

=== Events ===
Event	Gold		Silver		Bronze	
Men's singles	Manfred Schmid; Austria	2:52.48	Thomas Köhler; East Germany	2:52.66	Klaus Bonsack; East Germany	2:53.33
Women's singles (Note: Two East Germans, Ortrun Enderlein and Anna-Maria Müller, led after three runs, but with the fourth run cancelled, were position to win medals. However, the East Germans were accused of heating the runners of their sleds, and disqualified, promoting Lechner to the gold medal position.)	Erika Lechner; Italy	2:28.66	Christa Schmuck; West Germany	2:29.37	Angelika Dünhaupt; West Germany	2:29.56
Doubles	East Germany; Klaus Bonsack; Thomas Köhler	1:35.85	Austria; Manfred Schmid; Ewald Walch	1:36.34	West Germany; Wolfgang Winkler; Fritz Nachmann	1:37.29

== Participating NOCs ==
Fourteen nations participated in Luge at the Grenoble Games. Spain, France, Sweden and East and West Germany made their Olympic luge debuts.

- Austria (9)
- Canada (7)
- Spain (4)
- France (5) (Note: Jacqueline Barasinski represented France in the women's singles event.)
- West Germany (8)
- Great Britain (2)
- East Germany (8)
- Italy (9)
- Liechtenstein (3)
- Norway (2)
- Poland (9)
- Sweden (5)
- Czechoslovakia (6)
- United States (8)
