= FIBT World Championships 1967 =

Winter sport competition

1967 World Championships
- Location: Alpe d'Huez, France

The FIBT World Championships 1967 took place in Alpe d'Huez, France for the second time, having hosted the event previously in 1951. The Four-man bobsleigh event was cancelled for the second consecutive year though the cause this time was due to high temperatures that caused the ice on the track to melt rather than a competitor's death as had happened in the previous championship. This was the test event for the bobsleigh events for the Winter Olympics that would take place the following year in neighboring Grenoble.

== Two man bobsleigh ==
Pos	Team	Time
Gold	Austria (Erwin Thaler, Reinhold Dumthaler)	
Silver	Italy (Nevio De Zordo, Edoardo de Martin)	
Bronze	United States (Howard Clifton, James Crall)	

== Four man bobsleigh ==
The event was cancelled to warm temperatures on the track, causing the ice to melt.

== Medal table ==
Rank	Nation	Gold	Silver	Bronze	Total
1	Austria (AUT)	1	0	0	1
2	Italy (ITA)	0	1	0	1
3	United States (USA)	0	0	1	1
Totals (3 entries)		1	1	1	3
