= Jadwiga Damse =

Polish luger

Personal information
- Nationality: Polish
- Born: 5 September 1947 (age 78) Nisko, Poland

Sport
- Sport: Luge

Jadwiga Damse (born 5 September 1947) is a Polish luger. She competed in the women's singles event at the 1968 Winter Olympics.
