= Nevio de Zordo =

Italian bobsledder (1943–2014)

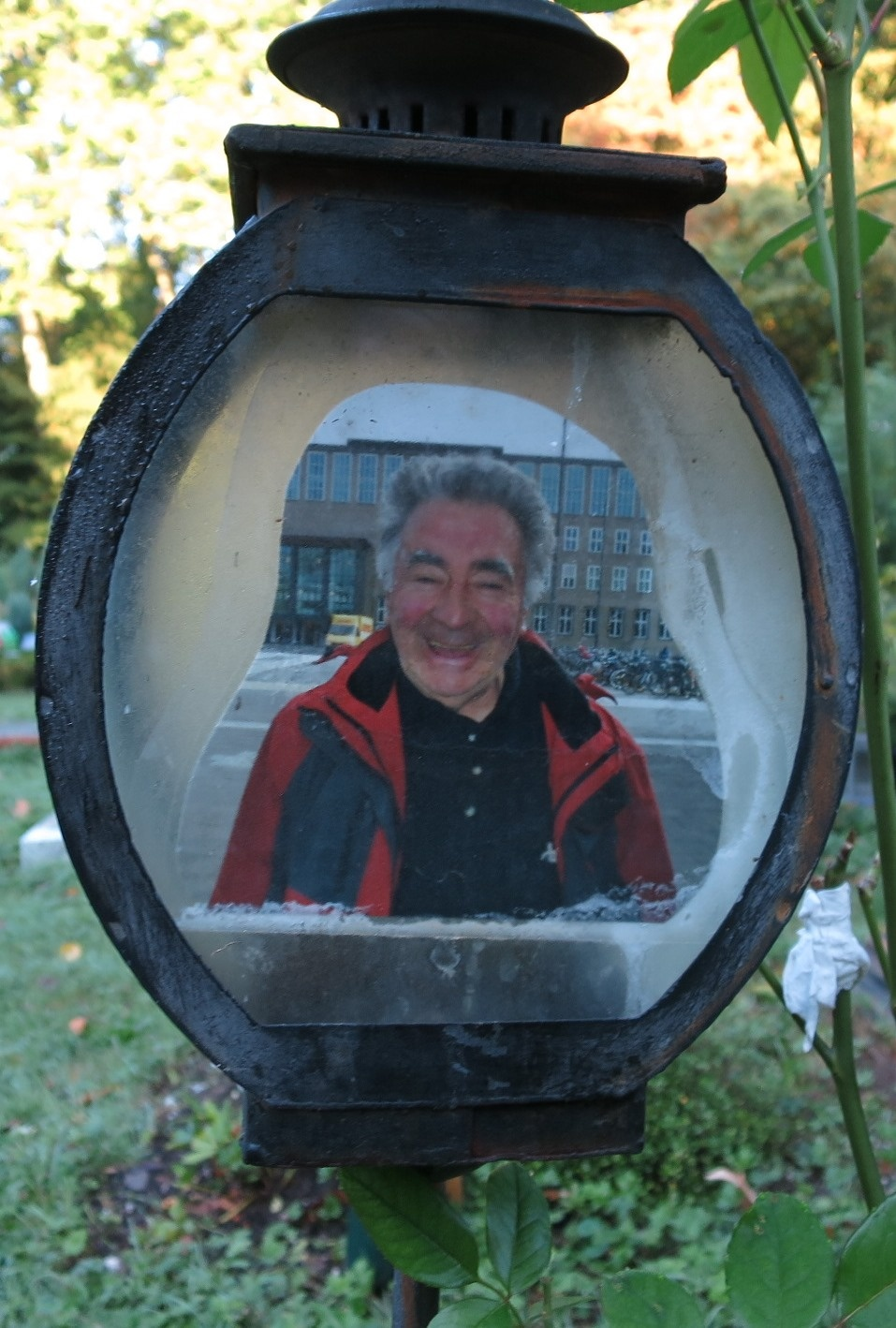

Medal record

Bobsleigh

Representing Italy

Olympic Games
Silver medal – second place	1972 Sapporo	Four-man

World Championships
Gold medal – first place	1969 Lake Placid	Two-man
Gold medal – first place	1970 St. Moritz	Four-man
Silver medal – second place	1965 St. Moritz	Four-man
Silver medal – second place	1967 Alpe d'Huez	Two-man

Nevio de Zordo (sometimes listed as Nevio De Zordo, 11 March 1943 – 27 March 2014) was an Italian bobsledder who competed from the mid-1960s until the early 1970s. He won the silver medal in the four-man event at the 1972 Winter Olympics in Sapporo.

De Zordo also won four medals at the FIBT World Championships with two golds (Two-man: 1969, Four-man: 1970) and two silvers (Two-man: 1967, Four-man: 1965).
