= Jean-Marie Bourgeois =

French Nordic combined skier (1939–2020)

Personal information
- Nationality: French
- Born: 19 November 1939; Morbier, France
- Died: 6 June 2020 (aged 80); Besançon, France

Sport
- Sport: Nordic combined

Jean-Marie Albert Bourgeois (19 November 1939 – 6 June 2020) was a French skier. He competed in the Nordic combined event at the 1968 Winter Olympics.
