= Edoardo de Martin =

Italian bobsledder

Medal record

Bobsleigh

World Championships
Silver medal – second place	1967 Alpe d'Huez	Two-man

Edoardo Tinter de Martin is an Italian bobsledder who competed in the late 1960s. He won a silver medal in the two-man event at the 1967 FIBT World Championships in Alpe d'Huez.
