= Büjiin Jalbaa =

Mongolian speed skater (born 1943)

Personal information
- Nationality: Mongolian
- Born: 15 July 1943 (age 81); Khövsgöl, Mongolia

Sport
- Sport: Speed skating

Büjiin Jalbaa (born 15 July 1943) is a Mongolian speed skater. He competed in the men's 1500 metres event at the 1968 Winter Olympics.
