= Marlene Korthals =

Austrian luger

Personal information
- Nationality: Austrian
- Born: 16 May 1943 (age 81); Öblarn, Nazi Germany

Sport
- Sport: Luge

Marlene Korthals (born 16 May 1943) is an Austrian luger. She competed in the women's singles event at the 1968 Winter Olympics.
