= Gervais Poirot =

French Nordic combined skier

Personal information
- Nationality: French
- Born: 4 March 1942 La Bresse, France
- Died: 5 June 2008 (aged 66)

Sport
- Sport: Nordic combined

Gervais Poirot (French: [ʒɛʁvɛ pwaʁo]; 4 March 1942 – 5 June 2008) was a French skier. He competed in the Nordic combined event at the 1968 Winter Olympics.
