= Émile Salvi =

French Nordic combined skier

Personal information
- Nationality: French
- Born: 10 September 1936 (age 89) Saint-Pierre-de-Chartreuse, France

Sport
- Sport: Nordic combined

Achievements and titles
- Olympic finals: 1968 Winter Olympics

Émile Salvi (born 10 September 1936) is a French skier. He competed in the Nordic combined event at the 1968 Winter Olympics.
