= Gerhard Gehring =

German skier

Personal information
- Nationality: German
- Born: 10 April 1945; Unterjoch, Germany
- Died: 26 June 2016 (aged 71); Oberstdorf, Germany

Sport
- Sport: Biathlon, cross-country skiing

Gerhard Gehring (10 April 1945 – 26 June 2016) was a German former skier. He competed at the 1968 Winter Olympics and the 1972 Winter Olympics.
