= Theo Merkel =

German biathlete

Personal information
- Nationality: German
- Born: 16 April 1934; Ruhpolding, Germany
- Died: 25 December 2002 (aged 68); Ruhpolding, Germany

Sport
- Sport: Biathlon

Theo Merkel (16 April 1934 – 25 December 2002) was a German biathlete. He competed at the 1968 Winter Olympics and the 1972 Winter Olympics.
