= Tom Upham =

American Nordic combined skier

Personal information
- Born: May 2, 1943 (age 83) Lewiston, Maine, United States

Sport
- Sport: Nordic combined

Tom Upham (born May 2, 1943) is an American skier. He competed in the Nordic combined event at the 1968 Winter Olympics.
