= Håkan Holmgren =

Swedish speed skater

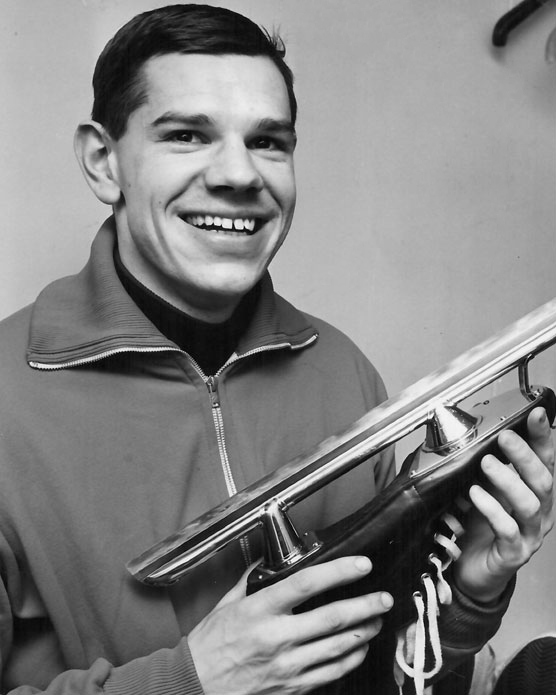

Personal information
- Full name: Karl Max Håkan Holmgren
- Born: 1 February 1942 (age 84) Borlänge, Sweden
- Height: 179 cm (5 ft 10 in)
- Weight: 75 kg (165 lb)

Sport
- Sport: Speed skating
- Club: Södermalms IK

Achievements and titles
- Personal bests: 500 m – 39.1 (1973); 1000 m – 1:21.4 (1973); 1500 m – 2:12.3 (1969); 5000 m – 8:36.3 (1973); 10000 m – 20:24.8 (1974)

Karl Max Håkan Holmgren (born 1 February 1942) is a retired Swedish speed skater. He competed in the 500 m event at the 1968 Winter Olympics and finished eighth.
