= Edward Williams (biathlete) =

American biathlete (born 1942)

Personal information
- Born: July 26, 1942 (age 84) Kingston, New York, U.S.

Sport
- Sport: Biathlon

Edward Williams (born July 26, 1942) is an American biathlete. He competed in the 20 km individual event at the 1968 Winter Olympics.
