= Tamio Dejima =

Japanese speed skater (born 1947)

Personal information
- Nationality: Japanese
- Born: 21 February 1947 (age 78); Nagano, Japan

Sport
- Sport: Speed skating

Tamio Dejima (born 21 February 1947) is a Japanese speed skater. He competed in the men's 500 metres event at the 1968 Winter Olympics.
