= Richard Wurster =

American speed skater (born 1942)

Personal information
- Nationality: American
- Born: August 27, 1942 (age 83) Schenectady, New York, United States

Sport
- Sport: Speed skating

Richard Wurster (born August 27, 1942) is an American speed skater. He competed in the men's 1500 metres event at the 1968 Winter Olympics.
