= Andreas Kunz =

East German Nordic combined skier (1946–2022)

Andreas Kunz (24 July 1946 – 1 January 2022) was a German Nordic combined athlete. His best-known finish was a bronze at the 1968 Winter Olympics in Grenoble in the Individual event. He competed for the SV Dynamo/SC Dynamo Klingenthal. Kunz died on 1 January 2022, at the age of 75.
