= Herbert Steinbeißer =

German cross-country skier (born 1938)

Personal information
- Nationality: German
- Born: 8 January 1938 (age 87); Ruhpolding, Germany

Sport
- Sport: Cross-country skiing

Herbert Steinbeißer (born 8 January 1938) is a German cross-country skier. He competed at the 1964 Winter Olympics and the 1968 Winter Olympics.
