= Hajime Yoshimura =

Japanese biathlete (born 1939)

Personal information
- Nationality: Japanese
- Born: 27 January 1939 (age 86); Hokkaido, Japan

Sport
- Sport: Biathlon

Hajime Yoshimura (born 27 January 1939) is a Japanese biathlete. He competed in the 20 km individual event at the 1968 Winter Olympics.
