= Karl Buhl =

German cross-country skier (born 1940)

Personal information
- Nationality: German
- Born: 21 January 1940 (age 85); Sonthofen, Germany

Sport
- Sport: Cross-country skiing

Karl Buhl (born 21 January 1940) is a German cross-country skier. He competed at the 1964 Winter Olympics and the 1968 Winter Olympics.
