= Anna Mąka (luger) =

Polish luger (born 1948)

Personal information
- Full name: Anna Mąka-Jakubowska
- Born: 18 February 1948 (age 78) Skomielna Czarna, Poland
- Height: 163 cm (5 ft 4 in)
- Weight: 65 kg (143 lb)

Sport
- Country: Poland
- Sport: Luge

Anna Mąka-Jakubowska (born 18 February 1948) is a Polish luger. She competed in the women's singles event at the 1968 Winter Olympics.
