= Arvo Kinnari =

Finnish biathlete

Personal information
- Nationality: Finnish
- Born: 13 September 1943 (age 81); Sakkola, Finland

Sport
- Sport: Biathlon

Arvo Kinnari (born 13 September 1943) is a Finnish biathlete. He competed in the 20 km individual event at the 1968 Winter Olympics.
