= Ralph Wakley =

American biathlete (born 1941)

Personal information
- Nationality: American
- Born: December 11, 1941 (age 84) Logan, Utah, United States

Sport
- Sport: Biathlon

Ralph Wakley (born December 11, 1941) is an American biathlete. He competed in the 20 km individual event at the 1968 Winter Olympics.
