= Günther Naumann =

German Nordic combined skier

Personal information
- Nationality: German
- Born: 19 April 1941 (age 84); Tannenberg, Germany

Sport
- Sport: Nordic combined

Günther Naumann (born 19 April 1941) is a German former skier. He competed in the Nordic combined event at the 1968 Winter Olympics.
