= Esa Åkerlund =

Convicted Finnish serial killer

- Born: Esa Kalle Vihtori Åkerlund; 5 July 1969 (age 57); Porvoo, Finland
- Convictions: Murder x4 Attempted murder x2
- Penalty: 8.5 years, later acquitted (first murder); Life imprisonment, commuted (second murder); 15 years (triple murder)

Details
- Victims: 4–5
- Span of crimes: 1995 – 2010 (possibly 1993)
- Country: Finland
- States: Eastern Uusimaa, Uusimaa
- Date apprehended: For the final time on 6 July 2010

Esa Kalle Vihtori Åkerlund (born 5 July 1969) is a Finnish serial killer. Initially sentenced to life imprisonment for the 1995 murder of his ex-wife, he was paroled, only to commit a triple murder in 2010, for which he received 15 years. In addition to this, he was acquitted of another in 1993, of which he still remains the prime suspect.

== Murders ==
=== First murder and acquittal ===
In October 1993, Åkerlund was dining at 'The Manor', a restaurant in Askola, when an argument arose and a fight subsequently broke out. During the scuffle, Åkerlund grabbed a knife and joined in. Employees tried to intervene, but were retaliated against, which resulted in the death of 28-year-old Veikko Nurmi, an off-duty security guard working for 'The Manor'.

After authorities were called to inspect the crime scene, a man came forward carrying a bloodied knife, claiming that he had found it by the roadside. Blood exams confirmed that the blood on the knife belonged to Nurmi, and that the knife itself belonged to Esa Åkerlund. When arrested for the crime, Åkerlund admitted that the weapon was indeed his, but denied committing the murder.

Åkerlund would be brought to trial and convicted, despite the lack of witnesses and solid evidence. He was sentenced to 8.5 years imprisonment, but he appealed his sentence an appellate court. Åkerlund was defended by renowned lawyer Heikki Salo, who convinced the jury that there was insufficient evidence against his client, and as a result, Åkerlund was acquitted by the Orimattila District Court in October 1994.

=== Murder of ex-wife ===
By September 1995, Åkerlund had been divorced from his wife, who had fled from him due to his abusive behaviour. Enraged that she had been handed over custody of their 2-year-old son, he tracked her down to her childhood home in Pernå, where he broke into during the middle of the night. He crept into her bedroom, where he started beating her before opting to shoot her with his Smith & Wesson semi-automatic pistol. The shot was heard by the ex-wife's brother, who barged into the room and shot at Åkerlund, narrowly missing him. In retaliation, Åkerlund shot once at him and his girlfriend, who was visiting at the time, wounding both non-fatally.

Åkerlund was arrested shortly after the crime was committed and charged with the murder of his ex-wife, as well as the attempted murder of her brother and his girlfriend. He claimed that he had done it in self-defence, but this claim was disregarded, and Åkerlund receiving a life sentence, which was upheld by the appellate court a year after his conviction.

=== Porvoo triple murder and imprisonment ===
On 1 December 2009, following a decision by the Helsinki Appellate Court, Åkerlund's life sentence was commuted and he was released from prison with time served.

On 5 July 2010, Åkerlund and a friend were partying and celebrating his birthday in Porvoo. In the early morning of the next day, they decided that they'd get some food from McDonald's. Åkerlund drove to the drive-through of the restaurant, with another car occupied by four men and a pregnant woman in front of them. For an unspecified reason, a dispute occurred between the two parties, prompting Åkerlund to pull out his revolver and shoot one of the passengers in the chest, killing him on the spot. When the other two attempted to help their dying friend, Åkerlund shot them in the mouth and the head, respectively. The pregnant woman and her boyfriend managed to escape. Åkerlund and his friend then tried to flee the scene by going on the motorway bound for Helsinki, but were both apprehended only ten minutes later.

While Åkerlund and his friend were in custody, police began investigating how a convicted murderer had obtained a firearm, determining that the 9mm S&W revolver had been sold to him illegally in May by two men. In October 2010, Åkerlund was put on trial for the triple murder, and two years later, he was found guilty on all counts and sentenced to 15 years imprisonment. The surveillance video which recorded the shootings at the restaurant was ordered to be sealed for 25 years at the request of family members. Claiming that his sentence was unjustly long, Åkerlund appealed to the Appellate Court, which upheld the lower court's decision.

== Criticism of Finnish law ==
The verdict made headlines abroad, especially in the United States, garnering criticism against Finland's lax sentencing. According to one article, commenters on a CNN article about the case mocked the Finnish justice system, its lacklustre gun control and some even claimed that Finland needed to bring back the death penalty.

== Personal life ==
Åkerlund is a Finnish Romani.

== See also ==
- List of serial killers by country
