= Wayne LeBombard =

American speed skater (1944–2022)

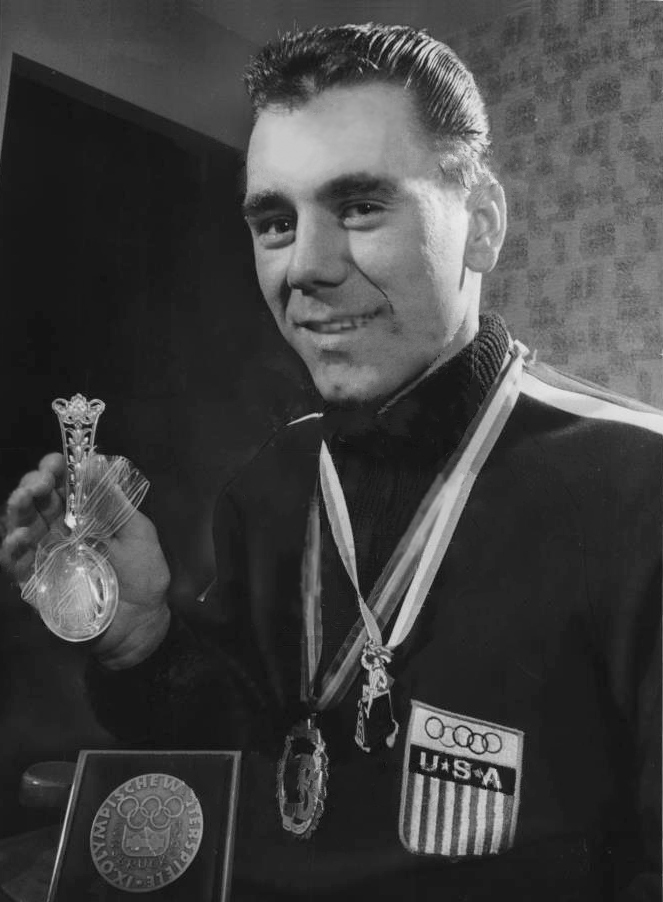
- LeBombard in 1964

Personal information
- Born: June 1, 1944 Milwaukee, Wisconsin, U.S.
- Died: June 24, 2022 (aged 78)
- Height: 175 cm (5 ft 9 in)
- Weight: 73 kg (161 lb)

Sport
- Sport: Speed skating
- Club: West Allis Speed Skating Club

Achievements and titles
- Personal bests: 500 m – 40.66 (1970); 1,000 m – 1:24.8 (1970); 1,500 m – 2:11.1 (1968); 5,000 m – 7:58.0 (1972); 10,000 m – 16:59.8 (1964)

Wayne Arthur LeBombard (June 1, 1944 – June 24, 2022) was an American speed skater. He competed at the 1964 and 1968 Winter Olympics with the best result of 23rd place in the 1500 m in 1968.

LeBombard grew up near Milwaukee, Wisconsin, and attended Nathan Hale High School. Besides skating he competed in cycling, winning the 1963 Wisconsin and Midwest road title. After retiring from sports he briefly worked at a sales company, at a moving company and at a bike shop. In 1987 he was sentenced to 45 days in jail for stealing money from the bike shop. He was also placed on probation for drug use and ordered to attend a drug rehabilitation program.
