= U.S. Biathlon Association =

National governing body for biathlon in the United States

United States Biathlon Association
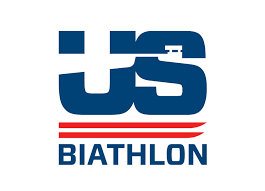
- Abbreviation: USBA
- Formation: 1980
- Type: National governing body (NGB)
- Headquarters: Midway, Utah, U.S.
- Region served: United States
- Affiliations: International Biathlon Union
- Website: www.usbiathlon.org

The United States Biathlon Association (USBA) is the national governing body for Olympic biathlon in the United States and a member of the International Biathlon Union (IBU). The USBA exists to support and encourage the development of biathlon in the United States and to prepare athletes for international competition, including the Winter Olympic Games.

Founded in 1980, USBA works with Biathlon Clubs and Regional Centers around the country to organize training and competition at the grassroots level and staffs and finances the US Biathlon National Team, Development Team, and Junior Team.
