= Esa Tapani =

Finnish horn player (born 1968)

Esa Tapani (born 1968) is a Finnish horn player. A member of the Finnish Radio Symphony Orchestra, he served as the soloist at its recording of Magnus Lindberg's Campana in aria.
