= Miki Shibuya =

Japanese biathlete (born 1940)

Personal information
- Nationality: Japanese
- Born: 15 May 1940 (age 84); Hokkaido, Japan

Sport
- Sport: Biathlon

Miki Shibuya (渋谷 幹, Shibuya Miki, born 15 May 1940) is a Japanese biathlete. He competed at the 1968 Winter Olympics and the 1972 Winter Olympics.
