= Ute Scheiffele =

German luger

Ute Scheiffele, née Gähler (born 12 February 1941), is a German luger who competed in the 1960s for East and West Germany. She was born in Oybin, Sachsen, which in 1949 became part of East Germany. She never won any medals on World, European or Olympic games with the best result fourth in the 1963 World Championship in Imst, Austria. In 1964 she fled to Bavaria and started for West Germany at the 1968 Winter Olympics in Grenoble.

== Career ==
Scheiffele participated in four world championships in the single luge class:

For East Germany:

- 1962 in Krynica Poland finished 24th
- 1963 in Imst Austria finished 4th

For West Germany:

- 1965 in Davos Switzerland finished 8th
- 1967 in Hammarstrand Sweden finished 13th

She also participated in 1967 European Championship in Königssee, West Germany, finishing 14th in the single luge class.

== Defection ==
She was selected to participate in 1964 Olympic Games in Innsbruck for East Germany, but defected to West Germany on 10 February 1964 before any race. The ZOV exhibition about East German sports refugees describes her escape: "As Eastern German sports functionaries had spread the wrong information that Austria extradited refugees to their home country, she didn't dare to contact the authorities for help. Gähler, hidden under a blanket, was smuggled to Bavaria in the car of a Western German colleague ..." Gähler soon found a job as secretary in Ulm and attended the sports center in Rottach-Egern to continue her training.

At the 1968 Winter Olympics in Grenoble, she originally finished 11th in the women's singles event, but was awarded 8th place upon the disqualifications of the East German team of Ortrun Enderlein (who finished first), Anna-Maria Müller (second), and Angela Knösel (fourth) when the East Germans were discovered to have illegally heated their luge's runners.
