= Mikkel Dobloug (skier) =

Norwegian Nordic combined skier (born 1944)

Mikkel Dobloug (born 7 July 1944) is a Norwegian Nordic combined skier.

He was born in Vang Municipality in Hedmark, and represented the club Vang Skiløperforening. He competed at the 1968 Winter Olympics in Grenoble, where he placed 21st in the individual Nordic combined. He became Norwegian champion in individual Nordic combined in 1966.
