= Stanisław Kawulok =

Polish Nordic combined skier

Stanisław Hubert Kawulok (born 2 November 1953 in Istebna) is a Polish former Nordic combined skier who competed in the 1976 Winter Olympics and in the 1980 Winter Olympics.
