= Ilpo Nuolikivi =

Finnish Nordic combined skier

Personal information
- Nationality: Finnish
- Born: 25 April 1942; Hämeenlinna, Finland
- Died: 7 July 2006 (aged 64); Muhos, Finland

Sport
- Sport: Nordic combined

Ilpo Nuolikivi (25 April 1942 – 7 July 2006) was a Finnish skier. He competed in the Nordic combined event at the 1968 Winter Olympics.
