= Wolfgang Winkler (luger) =

German luger (1940–2001)

Olympic medal record

Men's Luge

Representing West Germany
| Bronze medal – third place | 1968 Grenoble | Men's doubles |

Wolfgang Winkler (27 October 1940 – 11 May 2001) was a West German luger who competed in the late 1960s. He won the bronze medal in the men's doubles event at the 1968 Winter Olympics in Grenoble.
