= Mihoko Otsue =

Japanese alpine skier (born 1946)

Personal information
- Nationality: Japanese
- Born: 14 October 1946 (age 80) Oyama, Japan

Sport
- Sport: Alpine skiing

Mihoko Otsue (大杖 美保子, Ōtsue Mihoko; born 14 October 1946) is a Japanese alpine skier. She competed in three events at the 1968 Winter Olympics.
