= Herbert Hindelang =

German biathlete

Personal information
- Nationality: German
- Born: 18 December 1940 (age 84); Hertingen, Germany

Sport
- Sport: Biathlon

Herbert Hindelang (born 18 December 1940) is a German biathlete. He competed in the 20 km individual event at the 1968 Winter Olympics.
