= Roger Capan =

American speed skater

Personal information
- Nationality: American
- Born: May 20, 1945 Sioux City, Iowa, United States
- Died: March 2, 2013 (aged 67) Gulf Shores, Alabama, United States

Sport
- Sport: Speed skating

Roger Capan (May 20, 1945 – March 2, 2013) was an American speed skater. He competed in the men's 1500 metres event at the 1968 Winter Olympics.
