= Howard Clifton =

American bobsledder

Medal record

Bobsleigh

World Championships
Bronze medal – third place	1967 Alpe d'Huez	Two-man

Howard Clifton (July 1, 1939 – August 20, 1990) was an American bobsledder who competed in the late 1960s. He won a bronze medal in the two-man event at the 1967 FIBT World Championships in Alpe d'Huez. He also competed at the 1968 Winter Olympics.
