= Masatoshi Suto =

Japanese Nordic combined skier

Personal information
- Nationality: Japanese
- Born: 25 April 1945 (age 80); Gunma, Japan

Sport
- Sport: Nordic combined

Masatoshi Suto (須藤 正敏, Sutō Masatoshi; born 25 April 1945) is a Japanese skier. He competed in the Nordic combined event at the 1968 Winter Olympics.
