= Michael Luce =

American bobsledder (1941–2026)

Personal information
- Nationality: American
- Born: September 5, 1941 Port Henry, New York, U.S.
- Died: June 29, 2026 (aged 84)

Sport
- Sport: Bobsleigh

Michael Luce (September 5, 1941 – June 29, 2026) was an American bobsledder. He competed in the two-man and the four-man events at the 1968 Winter Olympics. Luce died on June 29, 2026, at the age of 84.
