= Gerhard Prinzing =

German alpine skier (1943–2018)

Gerhard Prinzing (22 April 1943 – 13 October 2018) was a German alpine skier who competed in the 1968 Winter Olympics.
