= Jenny Fish =

American speed skater

Personal information
- Full name: Jennifer Lee Fish
- Born: May 17, 1949 (age 77) Strongsville, Ohio, U.S.
Medal record
Women's speed skating
Representing United States
Olympic Games
Silver medal – second place	1968 Grenoble	500 m

Jennifer "Jenny" Lee Fish (born May 17, 1949) is an American speed skater who competed in the 1968 Winter Olympics.

== Early life ==
She was born in Strongsville, Ohio.

== Early career ==
Fish began seeing success at the age of 12 in 1961, when she won the Ohio indoor championship and the Cleveland Press Silver Skates Midget-Novice title. From there, he success grew, and by 1964 she won the National indoor and outdoor junior championships and the U.S. National indoor and outdoor titles.

Fish held eight separate U.S. national speed skating records throughout her career.

== Olympic career ==
At the age of 18, Fish qualified for the 1968 Winter Olympics despite limited international experience. However, she won the silver medal in the 500 metres event, finishing in a three-way tie with two other American skaters. In the 1000 metres competition she finished 23rd.

== Personal Bests ==
Event	Time	Date
500 m	45 s 9	1968
1,000 m	1 min 38 s 4	1968
1,500 m	2 min 35 s 0	1968

== Life After Skating ==
Following her speed skating career, Fish went on to earn a degree in health and physical education from Baldwin-Wallace College and a master's in education from Kent State University.
