= Mike Hessel =

American luger (born 1942)

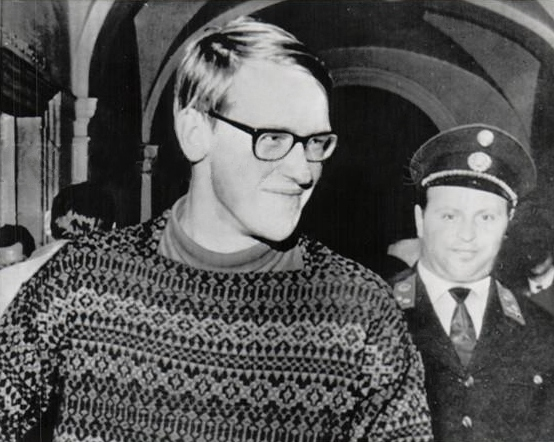
- Hessel at the 1964 Olympics

Personal information
- Nationality: American
- Born: December 6, 1942 (age 82); Portland, Oregon, United States
- Height: 186 cm (6 ft 1 in)
- Weight: 89 kg (196 lb)

Sport
- Sport: Luge
- Club: Tri-Pass Ski Club

John Michael Hessel (born December 6, 1942) is a retired American luger. He competed at the 1964 and 1968 Winter Olympics and placed 22nd and 30th, respectively.

Hessel was born to a doctor, and grew up in Eugene, Oregon. He attended Menlo High School, University of Oregon, UC Berkeley and Oregon State University. At the 1964 Olympics, he was arrested for a brawl with local police, but was later acquitted. After retiring from competitions Hessel became a commercial fisherman and then a melon farmer.
