= Tsuneo Noto =

Japanese skier (born 1944)

Personal information
- Nationality: Japanese
- Born: 20 February 1944 (age 82) Otaru, Hokkaido, Japan

Sport
- Sport: Alpine skiing

Tsuneo Noto (born 20 February 1944) is a Japanese alpine skier. He competed at the 1964 Winter Olympics and the 1968 Winter Olympics.
