= Jan Kawulok =

Polish Nordic combined skier (1946–2021)

Personal information
- Nationality: Polish
- Born: 27 January 1946; Wisła, Poland
- Died: 23 November 2021 (aged 75)

Sport
- Sport: Nordic combined

Jan Kawulok (27 January 1946 – 23 November 2021) was a Polish skier. He competed in the Nordic combined event at the 1968 Winter Olympics. He died on 23 November 2021, at the age of 75.
