= Hans Rudhardt =

German Nordic combined skier

Personal information
- Nationality: German
- Born: 17 September 1945 (age 79); Maierhöfen, Germany

Sport
- Sport: Nordic combined

Hans Rudhardt (born 17 September 1945) is a German former skier. He competed in the Nordic combined event at the 1968 Winter Olympics.
