= Xaver Kraus =

German biathlete

Personal information
- Nationality: German
- Born: 10 December 1934 (age 90); Reit im Winkl, Germany

Sport
- Sport: Biathlon

Xaver Kraus (born 10 December 1934) is a German former biathlete. He competed in the 20 km individual event at the 1968 Winter Olympics.
