= Katsutoshi Okubo =

Japanese Nordic combined skier

Personal information
- Nationality: Japanese
- Born: 25 June 1943 (age 81); Hokkaido, Japan

Sport
- Sport: Nordic combined

Katsutoshi Okubo (大久保 勝利, Ōkubo Katsutoshi, born 25 June 1943) is a Japanese skier. He competed in the Nordic combined event at the 1968 Winter Olympics.
