= Arja Kantola =

Finnish speed skater

Arja Klemz
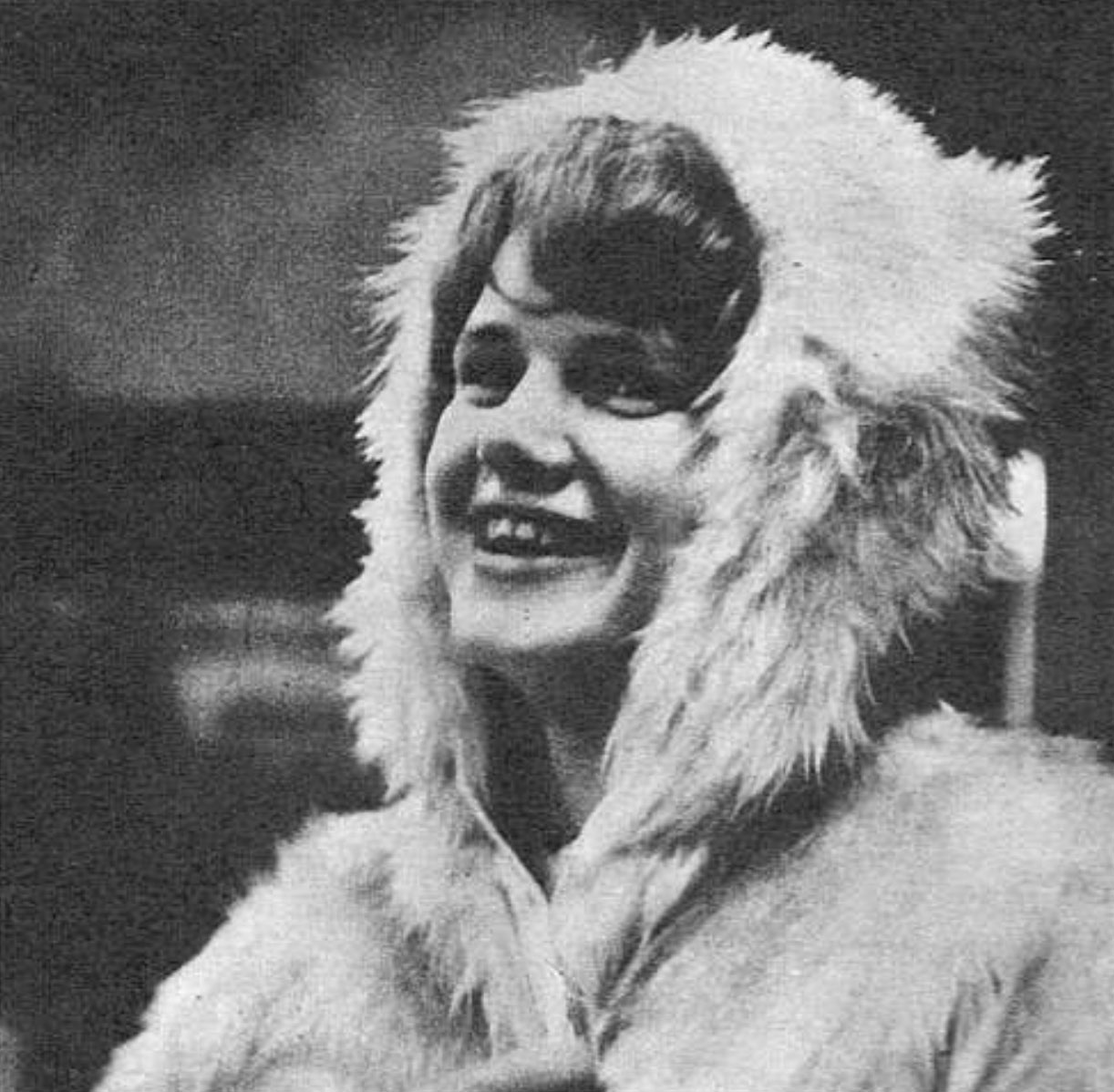

Personal information
- Birth name: Arja Leena Kantola
- Nationality: Finnish
- Born: 13 June 1949 (age 75); Rovaniemi, Finland

Sport
- Sport: Speed skating

Arja Leena Klemz (née Kantola; born 13 June 1949) is a Finnish speed skater. She competed at the 1968 Winter Olympics and the 1972 Winter Olympics. In 1972, she moved to Inzell, Germany. She married Walter Klemz and had three children, Marko, Kerstin and Melanie and six grandchildren, Lena, Hannah, Tobias, Amelie, Paula and Korbinian.
