= Jürgen Traub =

German speed skater

Personal information
- Nationality: German
- Born: 17 May 1943 (age 81); Schweinfurt, Germany

Sport
- Sport: Speed skating

Jürgen Traub (born 17 May 1943) is a German speed skater. He competed at the 1964 Winter Olympics and the 1968 Winter Olympics.
