= Bill Lanigan =

American speed skater (born 1947)

Personal information
- Born: August 6, 1947 (age 78) New York, New York, United States

Sport
- Sport: Speed skating

Achievements and titles
- Olympic finals: 1968 Winter Olympics, 1972 Winter Olympics

Bill Lanigan (born August 6, 1947) is an American speed skater. He competed at the 1968 Winter Olympics and the 1972 Winter Olympics.
