= Tadao Ishihata =

Japanese speed skater (born 1941)

Personal information
- Nationality: Japanese
- Born: 6 October 1941 (age 83); Tochigi, Japan

Sport
- Sport: Speed skating

Tadao Ishihata (born 6 October 1941) is a Japanese speed skater. He competed in two events at the 1968 Winter Olympics.
