= Esa Lehikoinen =

Finnish ice hockey player

- Born: April 17, 1986 (age 39); Joensuu, Finland
- Height: 5 ft 11 in (180 cm)
- Weight: 196 lb (89 kg; 14 st 0 lb)
- Position: Defence
- Shoots: Left
- Czech Extraliga team: BK Mladá Boleslav
- Playing career: 2007–present

Esa Lehikoinen (born April 17, 1986) is a Finnish professional ice hockey defenceman. He played with BK Mladá Boleslav in the Czech Extraliga during the 2010–11 Czech Extraliga season.
