= Kathleen Ann Roberts-Homstad =

American luger

Personal information
- Born: November 17, 1951 (age 73); Miles City, Montana, United States

Sport
- Sport: Luge

Kathleen Ann Roberts-Homstad (born November 17, 1951) is an American luger. She competed at the 1968 Winter Olympics, the 1972 Winter Olympics and the 1976 Winter Olympics.
