= Sachiko Saito =

Japanese speed skater)

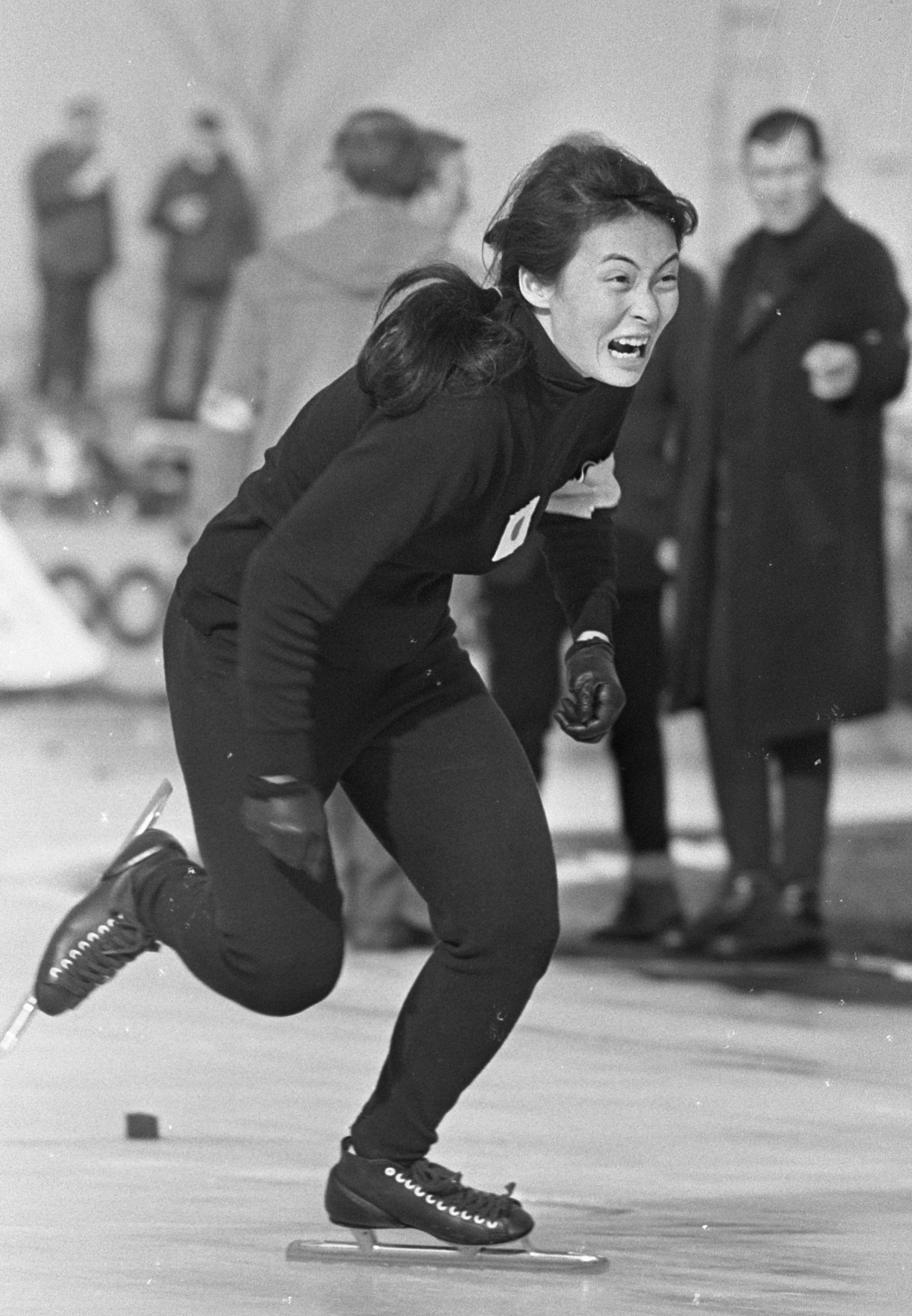
- Sachiko Saito in 1967

Personal information
- Born: 15 January 1947 Hiroshima, Japan
- Height: 1.56 m (5 ft 1 in)
- Weight: 54 kg (119 lb)

Sport
- Sport: Speed skating
- Club: Toyo University / Sankyo Seiki

Sachiko Saito (斎藤 幸子, Saitō Sachiko; 15 January 1947) was a Japanese speed skater. She competed at the 1968 and 1972 Winter Olympics in the 500, 1000 and 1500 m events with the best achievement of ninth place in the 500 m in 1972. She badly fell on the same distance in 1968.

She is sometimes confused with Jitsuko Saito who also competed in speed skating at the 1968 Olympics.

Personal bests:

- 500 m – 43.8 (1972)
- 1000 m – 1:29.4 (1972)
- 1500 m – 2:19.8 (1972)
- 3000 m – 5:02.9 (1972)
