= Hildegard Sellhuber =

German speed skater

Personal information
- Born: 7 July 1950 (age 75) Inzell, West Germany
- Height: 1.73 m (5 ft 8 in)
- Weight: 60 kg (130 lb)

Sport
- Sport: Speed skating
- Club: DEC Frillensee, Inzell

Hildegard Sellhuber (later Hildegard Zimmermann, born 7 July 1950) is a retired German speed skater. She competed at the 1968 Winter Olympics in the 500, 1000 and 1500 m events and finished in 21st, 16th and 9th place, respectively. She won West German all-around titles in 1966 and 1967.

She married Gerd Zimmermann, a West German speed skater who also competed at the 1968 Olympics.

Personal bests:

- 500 m – 46.5 (1968)
- 1000 m – 1:36.6 (1968)
- 1500 m – 2:27.5 (1968)
- 3000 m – 5:27.4 (1968)
