= Gerd Zimmermann (speed skater) =

German speed skater

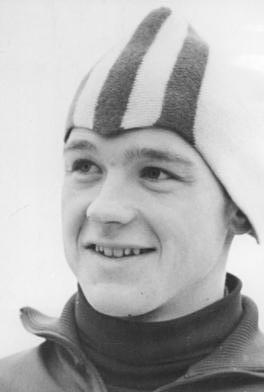
- Zimmermann in 1964

Personal information
- Born: 23 September 1942 (age 83) Munich, Germany
- Height: 1.85 m (6 ft 1 in)
- Weight: 80 kg (180 lb)

Sport
- Sport: Speed skating
- Club: DEC Frillensee, Inzell

Gerhard "Gerd" Zimmermann (born 23 September 1942) is a retired German speed skater. He competed at the 1964, 1968 and 1972 Winter Olympics in the 500, 1500, 5000 and 1000 m distances (eight events in total), for Germany and then for West Germany. His best achievements were seventh and eighth place in the 10000 m in 1964 and 1972, respectively.

Between 1964 and 1972 he won eight West German all-around titles.

He married Hildegard Sellhuber, a West German speed skater who also competed at the 1968 Olympics.

Personal bests:

- 500 m – 39.7 (1972)
- 1000 m – 1:20.5 (1972)
- 1500 m – 2:03.3 (1972)
- 5000 m – 7:21.6 (1969)
- 10000 m – 15:23.3 (1969)
