= Georg Krog (skier) =

American skier (born 1946)

Personal information
- Nationality: American
- Born: August 18, 1946 (age 79) Stockholm, Sweden

Sport
- Sport: Nordic combined

Georg Krog (born August 18, 1946) is an American skier. He competed in the Nordic combined event at the 1968 Winter Olympics.
