= Evi Sappl =

German speed skater

Personal information
- Nationality: German
- Born: 8 November 1947 (age 77); Bad Tölz, Allied-occupied Germany

Sport
- Sport: Speed skating

Evi Sappl (born 8 November 1947) is a German speed skater. She competed in two events at the 1968 Winter Olympics.
