= John Wurster =

American speed skater

Personal information
- Born: January 12, 1948 (age 78) Schenectady, New York, United States

Sport
- Sport: Speed skating

John Wurster (born January 12, 1948) is an American speed skater. He competed at the 1968 Winter Olympics and the 1972 Winter Olympics.
