= Misae Takeda =

Japanese speed skater (born 1943)

Personal information
- Nationality: Japanese
- Born: 22 October 1943 (age 81); Hokkaido, Japan

Sport
- Sport: Speed skating

Misae Takeda (武田 美佐江, Takeda Misae, born 22 October 1943) is a Japanese speed skater. She competed in two events at the 1968 Winter Olympics.
