= Kaname Ide =

Japanese speed skater (born 1947)

Personal information
- Nationality: Japanese
- Born: 4 July 1947 (age 78) Nagano, Nagano, Japan

Sport
- Sport: Speed skating

Kaname Ide (井出 かなめ, Ide Kaname; born 4 July 1947) is a Japanese speed skater. She competed at the 1968 Winter Olympics and the 1972 Winter Olympics.
