= Jitsuko Saito =

Japanese speed skater (born 1946)

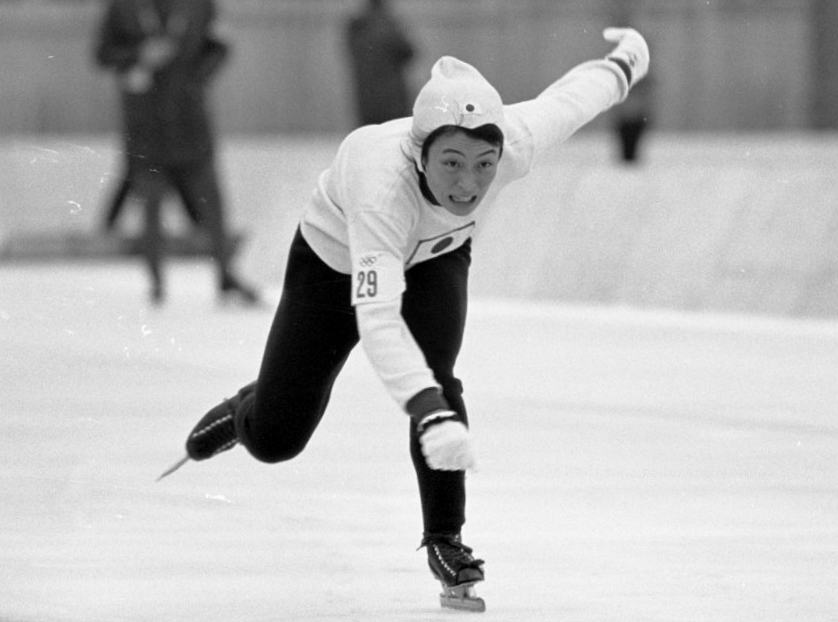
- Saito at the 1968 Winter Olympics

Personal information
- Born: 18 May 1946 (age 80) Nagano, Japan
- Height: 1.61 m (5 ft 3 in)
- Weight: 60 kg (130 lb)

Sport
- Sport: Speed skating
- Club: Sankyo Seiki

Jitsuko Saito (斎藤 実子, Saitō Jitsuko; born 18 May 1946) is a retired Japanese speed skater. She competed at the 1968 Winter Olympics and finished in 26th and 20th place in 1500 m and 3000 m, respectively.

She is sometimes confused with Sachiko Saito who also competed in speed skating at the 1968 Olympics.

Personal bests:

- 500 m – 49.3 (1968)
- 1000 m – 1:38.7 (1968)
- 1500 m – 2:28.1 (1968)
- 3000 m – 5:20.5 (1965)
