= Olavi Hjellman =

Finnish speed skater

Personal information
- Nationality: Finnish
- Born: 22 February 1945 (age 80); Kimitoön, Finland

Sport
- Sport: Speed skating

Olavi Hjellman (born 22 February 1945) is a Finnish speed skater. He competed in two events at the 1968 Winter Olympics.
