= Angelika Dünhaupt =

German luger

Medal record

Women's luge

Representing West Germany

Olympic Games
Bronze medal – third place	1968 Grenoble	Women's singles

European Championships
Silver medal – second place	1967 Königssee	Women's singles

Angelika Dünhaupt (born 22 December 1946) is a German luger who competed representing West Germany during the late 1960s and early 1970s. At the 1968 Winter Olympics in Grenoble, she originally finished sixth in the women's singles event, but was awarded the bronze medal upon the disqualifications of the East German team of Ortrun Enderlein (who finished first), Anna-Maria Müller (second), and Angela Knösel (fourth) when the East Germans were discovered to have their runners being illegally heated.

Dünhaupt also won the silver medal in the women's singles event at the 1967 FIL European Luge Championships in Königssee, West Germany.
