= Mutsuhiko Maeda =

Japanese speed skater (born 1947)

Personal information
- Nationality: Japanese
- Born: 7 May 1947 (age 77); Hokkaido, Japan

Sport
- Sport: Speed skating

Mutsuhiko Maeda (前田 睦彦, Maeda Mutsuhiko, born 7 May 1947) is a Japanese speed skater. He competed at the 1968 Winter Olympics and the 1972 Winter Olympics.
