= Jouko Launonen =

Finnish speed skater

Personal information
- Nationality: Finnish
- Born: 3 June 1939 (age 87) Jyväskylä, Finland

Sport
- Sport: Speed skating

Jouko Launonen (born 3 June 1939) is a Finnish speed skater. He competed at the 1964 Winter Olympics and the 1968 Winter Olympics.
