= Raimo Majuri =

Finnish Nordic combined skier

Personal information
- Nationality: Finnish
- Born: 30 July 1943 (age 82) Kemijärvi, Finland

Sport
- Sport: Nordic combined

Raimo Majuri (born 30 July 1943) is a Finnish skier. He competed in the Nordic combined events at the 1964 Winter Olympics and the 1968 Winter Olympics. He spent six years in prison in Denmark in the 1970s for smuggling drugs.
