= Esa Klinga =

Finnish Nordic combined skier (1939–2026)

Personal information
- Nationality: Finnish
- Born: 21 November 1939 Mikkeli, Finland
- Died: 25 May 2026 (aged 86) Lahti, Finland

Sport
- Sport: Nordic combined

Esa Klinga (21 November 1939 – 25 May 2026) was a Finnish skier. He competed in the Nordic combined events at the 1964 Winter Olympics and the 1968 Winter Olympics.

Klinga died on 25 May 2026, at the age of 86.
