= Cross-country skiing at the 1968 Winter Olympics – Women's 5 kilometre =

Cross-country skiing at the Olympics

Women's 5km at the X Olympic Winter Games
- Cross-country skiing
- Venue: Cross Country Skiing Stadium
- Date: 13 February 1968
- Competitors: 34 from 11 nations
- Winning time: 16:45.2

Medalists
1st place, gold medalist(s)		Toini Gustafsson	Sweden
2nd place, silver medalist(s)		Galina Kulakova	Soviet Union
3rd place, bronze medalist(s)		Alevtina Kolchina	Soviet Union

The Women's 5 kilometre cross-country skiing event was part of the cross-country skiing programme at the 1968 Winter Olympics, in Grenoble, France. It was the second appearance of the event. The competition was held on 13 February 1968, at Autrans.

== Results ==
Rank	Name	Country	Time
1	Toini Gustafsson	Sweden	16:45.2
2	Galina Kulakova	Soviet Union	16:48.4
3	Alevtina Kolchina	Soviet Union	16:51.6
4	Barbro Martinsson	Sweden	16:52.9
5	Marjatta Kajosmaa	Finland	16:54.6
6	Rita Achkina	Soviet Union	16:55.1
7	Inger Aufles	Norway	16:58.1
8	Senja Pusula	Finland	17:00.3
9	Stefania Biegun	Poland	17:03.4
10	Berit Mørdre-Lammedal	Norway	17:11.9
11	Marjatta Muttilainen-Olkkonen	Finland	17:12.4
12	Christine Nestler	East Germany	17:23.5
13	Gudrun Schmidt	East Germany	17:24.3
14	Renate Fischer-Köhler	East Germany	17:25.5
15	Britt Strandberg	Sweden	17:25.8
16	Anni Unger	East Germany	17:30.7
17	Monika Mrklas	West Germany	17:32.5
18	Barbro Tano	Sweden	17:35.8
19	Weronika Budny	Poland	17:38.2
20	Alevtina Olyunina-Smirnova	Soviet Union	17:43.2
21	Babben Enger-Damon	Norway	17:43.3
22	Helena Kivioja-Takalo	Finland	17:46.2
23	Józefa Czerniawska-Pęksa	Poland	17:56.5
24	Nadezhda Vasileva	Bulgaria	17:58.7
25	Michaela Endler	West Germany	17:59.2
26	Anna Gębala-Duraj	Poland	18:02.7
27	Éva Balázs	Hungary	18:05.8
28	Tone Dahle	Norway	18:09.1
29	Barbara Barthel	West Germany	18:20.0
30	Velichka Pandeva	Bulgaria	18:23.7
31	Tsvetana Sotirova	Bulgaria	18:27.3
32	Fujiko Kato	Japan	18:28.2
33	Roza Dimova	Bulgaria	19:05.6
34	Kirsten Carlsen	Denmark	19:56.6
