= Norway at the 1968 Winter Olympics =

- IOC code: NOR
- NOC: Norwegian Olympic Committee

in Grenoble, France 6–18 February, 1968
- Competitors: 65 (54 men, 11 women) in 8 sports
- Flag bearer: Bjørn Wirkola (Ski jumping)
- Medals Ranked 1st: Gold 6 Silver 6 Bronze 2 Total 14

Winter Olympics appearances (overview)
- 1924; 1928; 1932; 1936; 1948; 1952; 1956; 1960; 1964; 1968; 1972; 1976; 1980; 1984; 1988; 1992; 1994; 1998; 2002; 2006; 2010; 2014; 2018; 2022; 2026

Norway competed at the 1968 Winter Olympics in Grenoble, France.

== Medalists ==
Medal	Name	Sport	Event
Gold	Magnar Solberg	Biathlon	Men's 20 km
Gold	Harald Grønningen	Cross-country skiing	Men's 15 km
Gold	Ole Ellefsæter	Cross-country skiing	Men's 50 km
Gold	Odd Martinsen; Pål Tyldum; Harald Grønningen; Ole Ellefsæter	Cross-country skiing	Men's 4 × 10 km relay
Gold	Babben Enger Damon; Inger Aufles; Berit Mørdre Lammedal	Cross-country skiing	Women's 3 x 5 km relay
Gold	Fred Anton Maier	Speed skating	Men's 5000m
Silver	Ola Wærhaug; Olav Jordet; Magnar Solberg; Jon Istad	Biathlon	Men's 4 x 7.5 km relay
Silver	Odd Martinsen	Cross-country skiing	Men's 30 km
Silver	Berit Mørdre Lammedal	Cross-country skiing	Women's 10 km
Silver	Magne Thomassen	Speed skating	Men's 500m
Silver	Ivar Eriksen	Speed skating	Men's 1500m
Silver	Fred Anton Maier	Speed skating	Men's 10,000m
Bronze	Inger Aufles	Cross-country skiing	Women's 10 km
Bronze	Lars Grini	Ski jumping	Men's large hill

== Alpine skiing ==
Men

Athlete	Event	Race 1		Race 2		Total	
Athlete	Event	Time	Rank	Time	Rank	Time	Rank
Otto Tschudi	Downhill					DNF	–
Lasse Hamre	Downhill					2:06.93	34
Jon Terje Øverland	Downhill					2:05.34	23
Bjarne Strand	Downhill					2:03.20	17
Otto Tschudi	Giant Slalom	DNF	–	–	–	DNF	–
Bjarne Strand	Giant Slalom	1:49.69	33	1:51.48	32	3:41.17	29
Jon Terje Øverland	Giant Slalom	1:49.30	32	1:50.27	18	3:39.57	25
Håkon Mjøen	Giant Slalom	1:47.63	23	1:50.71	21	3:38.34	19

Men's slalom

Athlete	Heat 1		Heat 2		Final					
Athlete	Time	Rank	Time	Rank	Time 1	Rank	Time 2	Rank	Total	Rank
Håkon Mjøen	52.36	1 QF	–	–	49.91	9	DSQ	–	DSQ	–
Bjarne Strand	54.18	1 QF	–	–	51.69	21	55.69	24	1:47.38	22
Jon Terje Øverland	51.93	2 QF	–	–	51.51	18	53.37	22	1:44.88	17
Lasse Hamre	53.33	2 QF	–	–	51.84	23	52.31	18	1:44.15	14

Women

Athlete	Event	Race 1		Race 2		Total	
Athlete	Event	Time	Rank	Time	Rank	Time	Rank
Aud Hvammen	Giant Slalom					2:01.30	28
Aud Hvammen	Slalom	DSQ	–	–	–	DSQ	–
Dikke Eger-Bergmann	Slalom	43.50	15	DNF	–	DNF	–

== Biathlon ==
Men

Event	Athlete	Time	Penalties	Adjusted time ^{1}	Rank
20 km	Ragnar Tveiten	1'16:17.4	11	1'27:17.4	26
20 km	Ola Wærhaug	1'19:12.9	3	1'22:12.9	13
20 km	Jon Istad	1'19:43.1	2	1'21:43.1	11
20 km	Magnar Solberg	1'13:45.9	0	1'13:45.9	1st place, gold medalist(s)

^{1} One minute added per close miss (a hit in the outer ring), two minutes added per complete miss.

Men's 4 x 7.5 km relay

Athletes	Race		
Athletes	Misses ^{2}	Time	Rank
Ola Wærhaug; Olav Jordet; Magnar Solberg; Jon Istad	5	2'14:50.2	2nd place, silver medalist(s)

^{2} A penalty loop of 200 metres had to be skied per missed target.

== Cross-country skiing ==
Men

Event	Athlete	Race	
Event	Athlete	Time	Rank
15 km	Reidar Hjermstad	50:25.7	17
15 km	Odd Martinsen	48:59.3	8
15 km	Pål Tyldum	48:42.0	7
15 km	Harald Grønningen	47:54.2	1st place, gold medalist(s)
30 km	Gjermund Eggen	1'43:29.6	34
30 km	Harald Grønningen	1'38:26.7	13
30 km	Lorns Skjemstad	1'37:53.4	11
30 km	Odd Martinsen	1'36:28.9	2nd place, silver medalist(s)
50 km	Odd Martinsen	2'33:51.4	18
50 km	Reidar Hjermstad	2'31:01.8	8
50 km	Pål Tyldum	2'29:26.7	4
50 km	Ole Ellefsæter	2'28:45.8	1st place, gold medalist(s)

Men's 4 × 10 km relay

Athletes	Race	
Athletes	Time	Rank
Odd Martinsen; Pål Tyldum; Harald Grønningen; Ole Ellefsæter	2'08:33.5	1st place, gold medalist(s)

Women

Event	Athlete	Race	
Event	Athlete	Time	Rank
5 km	Tone Dahle	18:09.1	28
5 km	Babben Enger-Damon	17:43.3	21
5 km	Berit Mørdre-Lammedal	17:11.9	10
5 km	Inger Aufles	16:58.1	7
10 km	Katharina Mo-Berge	39:35.4	17
10 km	Babben Enger-Damon	38:54.4	8
10 km	Inger Aufles	37:59.9	3rd place, bronze medalist(s)
10 km	Berit Mørdre-Lammedal	37:54.6	2nd place, silver medalist(s)

Women's 3 x 5 km relay

Athletes	Race	
Athletes	Time	Rank
Inger Aufles; Babben Enger-Damon; Berit Mørdre-Lammedal	57:30.0	1st place, gold medalist(s)

== Ice hockey ==
=== First round ===
East Germany - Norway 3:1 (2:1, 1:0, 0:0)
Goalscorers: Joachim Ziesche, Lothar Fuchs, Peter Prusa - Odd Syversen.

=== Consolation round ===
Teams in this group play for 9th-14th places.

Rank	Team	Pld	W	L	T	GF	GA	Pts
9	Yugoslavia	5	5	0	0	33	9	10
10	Japan	5	4	1	0	27	12	8
11	Norway	5	3	2	0	15	15	6
12	Romania	5	2	3	0	22	23	4
13	Austria	5	1	4	0	12	27	2
14	France	5	0	5	0	9	32	0

Norway – France 4:1 (1:1, 2:0, 1:0)
Goalscorers: Hagensen, Smefjell, Dalsören, Mikkelsen – Liberman.

Japan – Norway 4:0 (2:0, 2:0, 0:0)
Goalscorers: Okajima 2, Ebina, Araki.

Norway – Austria 5:4 (3:1, 2:1, 0:2)
Goalscorers: Dalsören 2, Bjölbak, Olsen, Hansen – Schupp 2, Weingärtner, St. John.

Norway – Romania 4:3 (2:2, 1:1, 1:0)
Goalscorers: Bergeid, Olsen, Syversen, Mikkelsen – Pana, Iuliu Szabo, Czaka.

(Socialist Federal Republic of Yugoslavia) Yugoslavia – Norway 3:2 (1:1, 0:0, 2:1)
Goalscorers: Hiti, Franz Smolej, Ivo Jan - Dalsören, Bjölbak.

=== Contestants ===
- Team Roster

- Kåre Østensen
- Svein Hansen
- Thor Martinsen
- Terje Steen
- Odd Syversen
- Tor Gundersen
- Christian Petersen
- Per Skjerwen Olsen
- Georg Smefjell
- Olav Dalsøren
- Arne Mikkelsen
- Steinar Bjølbakk
- Svein Haagensen
- Terje Thoen
- Bjørn Johansen
- Rodney Riise
- Trygve Bergeid

== Luge ==
Men

Athlete	Run 1		Run 2		Run 3		Total	
Athlete	Time	Rank	Time	Rank	Time	Rank	Time	Rank
Rolf Greger Strøm	59.04	22	59.28	21	58.67	15	2:56.99	19
Jan-Axel Strøm	58.84	18	59.26	20	59.04	20	2:57.14	21

== Nordic combined ==
Events:

- normal hill ski jumping (Three jumps, best two counted and shown here.)
- 15 km cross-country skiing

Athlete	Event	Ski Jumping				Cross-country			Total	
Athlete	Event	Distance 1	Distance 2	Points	Rank	Time	Points	Rank	Points	Rank
Kåre Olav Berg	Individual	69.0	70.0	204.4	15	53:57.8	171.20	34	375.60	28
Gjert Andersen	Individual	72.5	72.5	221.2	7	1'00:28.3	102.49	41	323.69	40
Mikkel Dobloug	Individual	69.0	68.0	192.4	26	51:55.8	194.82	21	391.90	19
Markus Svendsen	Individual	71.0	72.0	210.8	12	54:19.4	167.05	35	377.85	27

== Ski jumping ==
Athlete	Event	Jump 1		Jump 2		Total	
Athlete	Event	Distance	Points	Distance	Points	Points	Rank
Jan Olaf Roaldset	Normal hill	73.0	99.6	73.0	98.1	197.7	21
Jo Inge Bjørnebye	Normal hill	73.5	101.4	67.0	89.0	190.4	31
Lars Grini	Normal hill	74.5	104.5	73.0	101.6	206.1	13
Bjørn Wirkola	Normal hill	76.5	108.7	72.5	103.3	212.0	4
Bjørn Wirkola	Large hill	93.0	102.1	87.0	87.2	189.3	23
Bent Tomtum	Large hill	98.5	108.3	95.0	103.9	212.2	5
Jan Olaf Roaldset	Large hill	100.5	109.6	91.5	93.0	202.6	13
Lars Grini	Large hill	99.0	111.5	93.5	102.8	214.3	3rd place, bronze medalist(s)

== Speed skating ==
Men

Event	Athlete	Race	
Event	Athlete	Time	Rank
500 m	Johan Lind	42.3	29
500 m	Roar Grønvold	41.1	13
500 m	Arne Herjuaune	40.7	5
500 m	Magne Thomassen	40.5	2nd place, silver medalist(s)
1500 m	Svein-Erik Stiansen	2:05.5	7
1500 m	Bjørn Tveter	2:05.2	5
1500 m	Magne Thomassen	2:05.1	4
1500 m	Ivar Eriksen	2:05.0	2nd place, silver medalist(s)
5000 m	Svein-Erik Stiansen	7:39.6	12
5000 m	Per Willy Guttormsen	7:27.8	4
5000 m	Fred Anton Maier	7:22.4 WR	1st place, gold medalist(s)
10,000 m	Magne Thomassen	15:44.9	7
10,000 m	Per Willy Guttormsen	15:32.6	4
10,000 m	Fred Anton Maier	15:23.9	2nd place, silver medalist(s)

Women

Event	Athlete	Race	
Event	Athlete	Time	Rank
500 m	Lisbeth Korsmo-Berg	47.0	11
500 m	Kirsti Biermann	46.8	8
500 m	Sigrid Sundby-Dybedahl	46.7	6
1000 m	Lisbeth Korsmo-Berg	1:36.8	13
1000 m	Kirsti Biermann	1:35.0	9
1000 m	Sigrid Sundby-Dybedahl	1:34.5	6
1500 m	Lisbeth Korsmo-Berg	2:30.7	17
1500 m	Kari Kåring	2:29.9	14
1500 m	Sigrid Sundby-Dybedahl	2:25.2	4
3000 m	Kari Kåring	5:20.6	17
3000 m	Lisbeth Korsmo-Berg	5:19.6	16
3000 m	Sigrid Sundby-Dybedahl	5:13.3	9
