= Nordic skiing at the 1968 Winter Olympics =

At the 1968 Winter Olympics, ten Nordic skiing events were contested – seven cross-country skiing events, two ski jumping events, and one Nordic combined event.

The winners for Nordic combined were Franz Keller for West Germany with gold, Alois Kälin for Switzerland with silver, and Andreas Kunz for East Germany with bronze. Jiri Raska of Czechoslovakia, who won normal hill, and Vladimir Belousov of the USSR, who won large hall, were the two gold medalists for ski jumping. In the men's cross-country skiing Harald Grønningen of Norway won the 15 km, Ole Ellefsaeter of Norway won the 50 km, and Franco Nones of Italy won the 30 km. The relay winners for men were the Norwegians Odd Martinsen, Pål Tyldum, Ole Ellefsaeter, and Harald Grønningen. In women's cross-country skiing Toini Gustafsson of Sweden won the 5 and 10 km. The relay winners for women were the Norwegians Babben Enger, Inger Aufles, and Berit Mørdre.

Nordic skiing discipline	Men's events	Women's events
Cross-country skiing	• 15 km	• 5 km
Cross-country skiing	• 30 km	• 10 km
Cross-country skiing	• 50 km	• 10 km
Cross-country skiing	• 4 × 10 km relay	• 3 × 5 km relay
Ski jumping	• Large hill	none
Ski jumping	• Normal hill	none
Nordic combined	• Individual	none
