= Cross-country skiing at the 1968 Winter Olympics – Women's 10 kilometre =

Cross-country skiing at the Olympics

Women's 10km at the X Olympic Winter Games
- Cross-country skiing
- Venue: Cross Country Skiing Stadium
- Date: 9 February 1968
- Competitors: 34 from 11 nations
- Winning time: 36:46.5

Medalists
1st place, gold medalist(s)		Toini Gustafsson	Sweden
2nd place, silver medalist(s)		Berit Mørdre	Norway
3rd place, bronze medalist(s)		Inger Aufles	Norway

The Women's 10 kilometre cross-country skiing event was part of the cross-country skiing programme at the 1968 Winter Olympics, in Grenoble, France. It was the fifth appearance of the event. The competition was held on 9 February 1968, at Autrans.

== Results ==
Rank	Name	Country	Time
1	Toini Gustafsson	Sweden	36:46.5
2	Berit Mørdre	Norway	37:54.6
3	Inger Aufles	Norway	37:59.9
4	Barbro Martinsson	Sweden	38:07.1
5	Marjatta Kajosmaa	Finland	38:09.0
6	Galina Kulakova	Soviet Union	38:26.7
7	Alevtina Kolchina	Soviet Union	38:52.9
8	Babben Enger-Damon	Norway	38:54.4
9	Christine Nestler	East Germany	39:07.9
10	Barbro Tano	Sweden	39:09.6
11	Alevtina Olyunina-Smirnova	Soviet Union	39:10.3
12	Senja Pusula	Finland	39:12.5
13	Faadiya Salimzhanova	Soviet Union	39:17.9
14	Gudrun Schmidt	East Germany	39:22.8
15	Britt Strandberg	Sweden	39:25.7
16	Renate Fischer-Köhler	East Germany	39:27.4
17	Katharina Mo-Berge	Norway	39:35.4
18	Liisa Suihkonen	Finland	39:55.3
19	Stefania Biegun	Poland	39:55.4
20	Monika Mrklas	West Germany	39:58.2
21	Weronika Budny	Poland	40:09.4
22	Anni Unger	East Germany	40:36.8
23	Fujiko Kato	Japan	40:40.0
24	Éva Balázs	Hungary	40:58.3
25	Józefa Czerniawska-Pęksa	Poland	40:59.9
26	Michaela Endler	West Germany	41:01.1
27	Nadezhda Vasileva	Bulgaria	41:25.8
28	Tsvetana Sotirova	Bulgaria	42:16.5
29	Roza Dimova	Bulgaria	43:18.4
30	Anna Gębala-Duraj	Poland	43:23.8
31	Velichka Pandeva	Bulgaria	43:26.3
32	Kirsten Carlsen	Denmark	46:56.2
	Helena Kivioja-Takalo	Finland	DNF
	Barbara Barthel	West Germany	DNF
