= Anna Unger =

German cross-country skier (born 1944)

Medal record

Women's cross-country skiing

Representing East Germany

World Championships
Silver medal – second place	1970 Vysoké Tatry	3 × 5 km relay

Anna Unger (born 2 May 1944) is a former East German cross-country skier who competed in the late 1960s and early 1970s, and at the Winter Olympics in Grenoble and Sapporo. She earned a silver medal in the 3 × 5 km relay at the 1970 FIS Nordic World Ski Championships in Vysoké Tatry.

Unger is the sister of German skier Martin Körner, and is married to German skier Helmut Unger.

== Cross-country skiing results ==
=== Olympic Games ===
Year	Age	5 km	10 km	3 × 5 km relay
1968	23	16	22	—
1972	27	28	20	5

=== World Championships ===
- 1 medal – (1 silver)

Year	Age	5 km	10 km	3 × 5 km relay
1966	21	—	—	4
1970	25	—	—	Silver
