= Senja Pusula =

Finnish cross-country skier

Medal record

Women's cross-country skiing

Representing Finland

Olympic Games
| Bronze medal – third place | 1964 Innsbruck | 3 × 5 km relay |

World Championships
| Bronze medal – third place | 1970 Vysoké Tatry | 3 × 5 km relay |

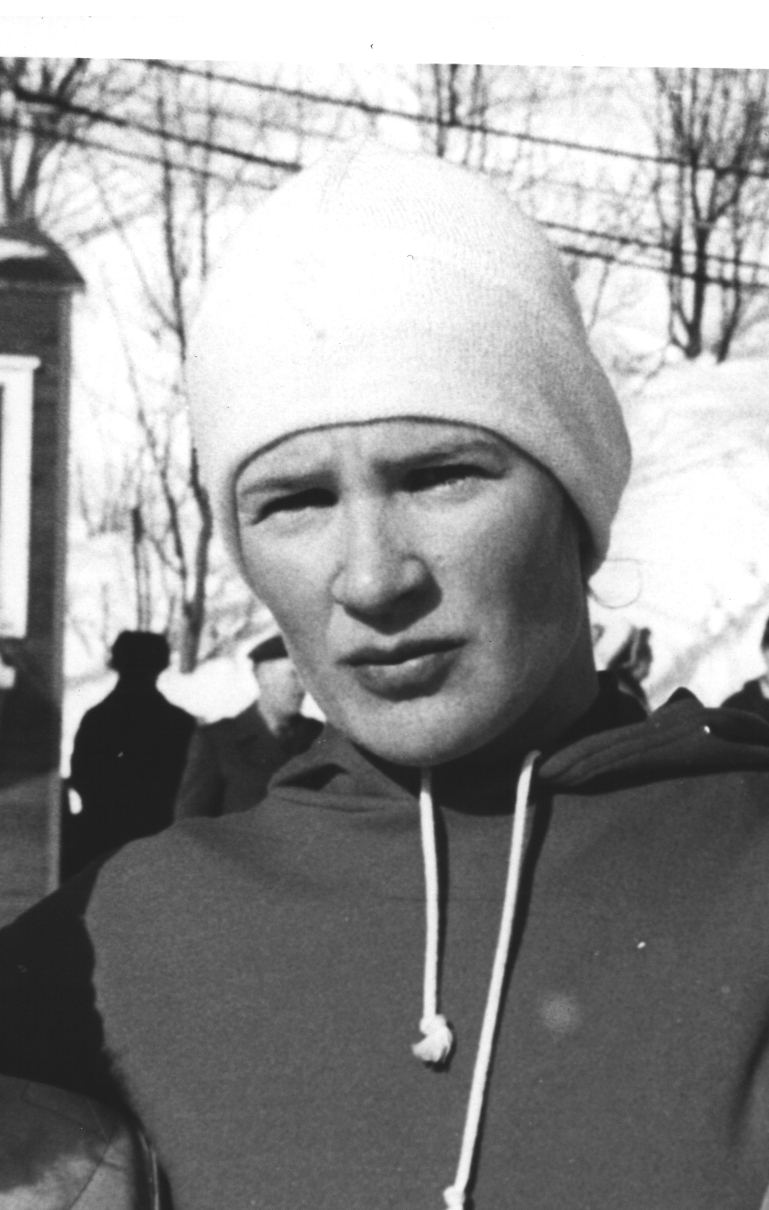

Senja Pusula (born 26 March 1941) is a former cross-country skier from Finland who competed during the 1960s and early 1970s. She won a bronze medal in the 3 × 5 km relay at the 1964 Winter Olympics in Innsbruck.

Pusula also won a bronze medal in the 3 × 5 km relay at the 1970 FIS Nordic World Ski Championships. She also won the 5 km event at the Holmenkollen ski festival in 1968.

== Cross-country skiing results ==
All results are sourced from the International Ski Federation (FIS).

=== Olympic Games ===
1 medal – (1 bronze)

| Year | Age | 5 km | 10 km | 3 × 5 km relay |
|---|---|---|---|---|
| 1964 | 22 | 9 | 6 | Bronze |
| 1968 | 26 | 8 | 12 | 4 |
| 1972 | 30 | 25 | — | — |

=== World Championships ===
- 1 medal – (1 bronze)

| Year | Age | 5 km | 10 km | 3 × 5 km relay |
|---|---|---|---|---|
| 1966 | 24 | 8 | 10 | 5 |
| 1970 | 28 | 6 | — | Bronze |
