= Katharina Mo-Berge =

Norwegian orienteer (born 1944)

Personal information
- Born: 28 August 1944 (age 81) Trondheim, Norway

Sport
- Sport: Cross-country skiing; Orienteering
- Club: SK Freidig

Katharina Louise Mo-Berge (born 28 August 1944) is a Norwegian cross-country skier and orienteering competitor from Trondheim. She competed in 10 km at the 1968 Winter Olympics in Grenoble, and in 5 and 10 km at the 1972 Winter Olympics in Sapporo.

She was Norwegian cross-country skiing champion in 1972, in both 5 and 10 km, and was awarded the King's Cup.

She competed in the 1968 World Orienteering Championships, where she placed 12th in the individual competition.

== Cross-country skiing results ==
=== Olympic Games ===
Year	Age	5 km	10 km	3 × 5 km relay
1968	23	—	17	—
1972	27	17	29	—

=== World Championships ===
Year	Age	5 km	10 km	3/4 × 5 km relay
1966	21	22	—	—
1970	25	—	38	—
1974	29	17	—	6
