= Faadiya Salimzhanova =

Soviet cross-country skier

Personal information
- Nationality: Soviet
- Born: 1 February 1935 (age 90) Baltasinsky, Soviet Union

Sport
- Sport: Cross-country skiing

Faadiya Salimzhanova (born 1 February 1935) is a Soviet cross-country skier. She competed in the women's 10 kilometres at the 1968 Winter Olympics.

== Cross-country skiing results ==
=== Olympic Games ===
| Year | Age | 5 km | 10 km | 3 × 5 km relay |
|---|---|---|---|---|
| 1968 | 33 | — | 13 | — |
