= Tone Dahle =

Norwegian cross-country skier

Personal information
- Born: 10 August 1945 (age 80) Oslo, Norway

Sport
- Sport: Cross-country skiing
- Club: IF Ready

Tone Dahle (born 10 August 1945) is a Norwegian cross-country skier from Oslo. She competed in 5 km at the 1968 Winter Olympics in Grenoble, where she placed 28th.

== Cross-country skiing results ==
=== Olympic Games ===
Year	Age	5 km	10 km	3 × 5 km relay
1968	22	28	—	—

=== World Championships ===
Year	Age	5 km	10 km	3 × 5 km relay
1966	20	—	31	—
