= Barbro Tano =

Swedish cross-country skier

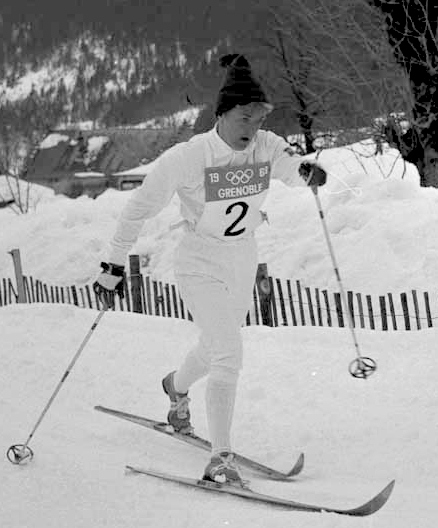
- Tano at the 1968 Olympics

Personal information
- Born: 30 November 1939 (age 86) Pajala, Sweden
- Height: 153 cm (5 ft 0 in)
- Weight: 50 kg (110 lb)

Sport
- Sport: Cross-country skiing
- Club: IFK Kiruna

Ella Barbro Tano (born 30 November 1939) is a retired Swedish cross-country skier. She competed in the 5 km and 10 km events at the 1968 and 1972 Winter Olympics and finished in 10–19th place.

== Cross-country skiing results ==
=== Olympic Games ===
Year	Age	5 km	10 km	3 × 5 km relay
1968	28	18	10	—
1972	32	19	13	—
