= Marjatta Muttilainen-Olkkonen =

Finnish cross-country skier (born 1946)

Personal information
- Nationality: Finnish
- Born: 21 August 1946 (age 80) Virrat, Finland

Sport
- Sport: Cross-country skiing

Marjatta Muttilainen-Olkkonen (born 21 August 1946) is a Finnish cross-country skier. She competed at the 1968 Winter Olympics and the 1972 Winter Olympics.

== Cross-country skiing results ==
=== Olympic Games ===
Year	Age	5 km	10 km	3 × 5 km relay
1968	21	11	—	4
1972	25	—	22	—
