= Lorns Skjemstad =

Norwegian cross-country skier (1940–2024)

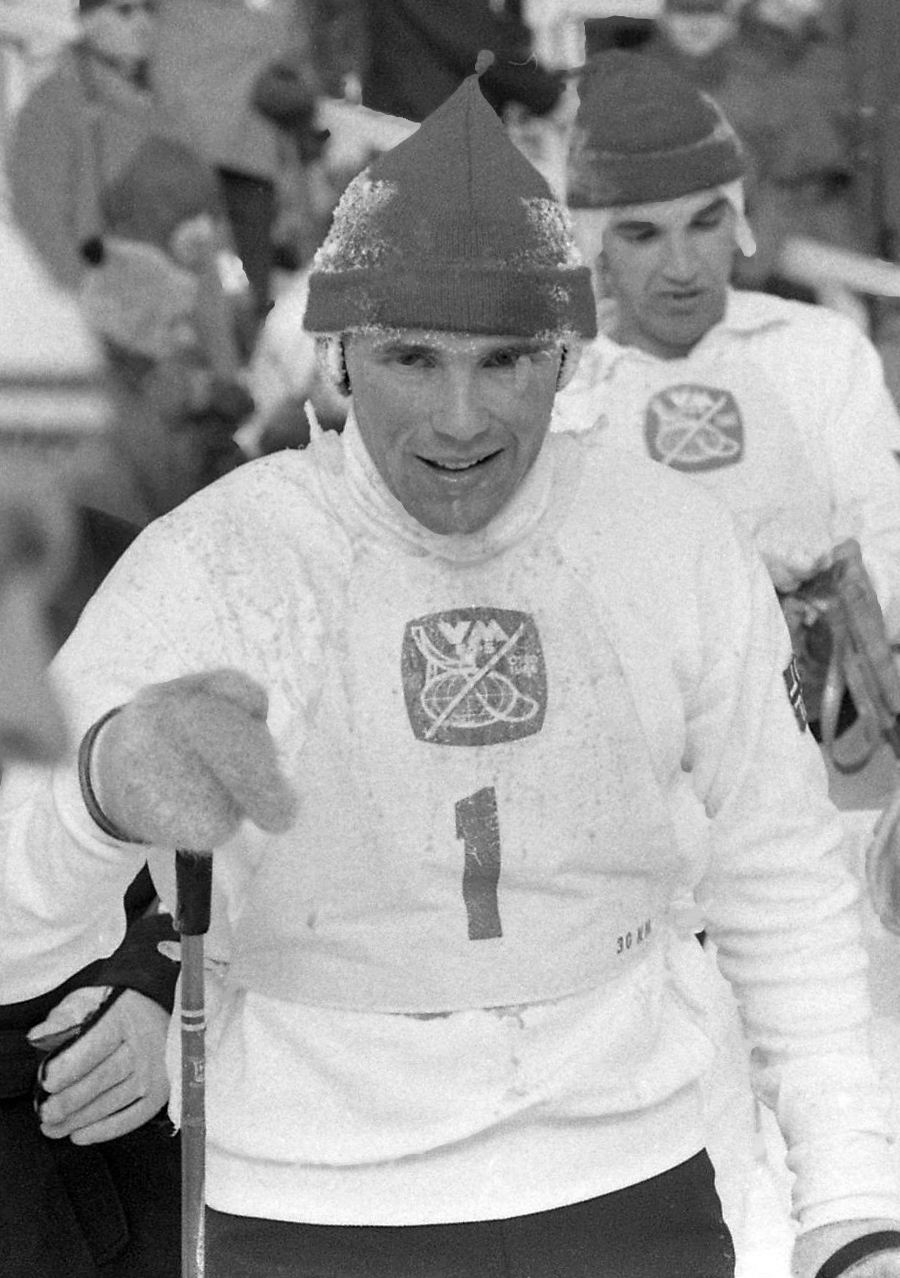
- Skjemstad running 30 km at the 1966 World Championships

Personal information
- Born: 10 March 1940 Inderøy Municipality, Norway
- Died: 18 February 2024 (aged 83)
- Education: Norwegian School of Sport Sciences

Sport
- Sport: Cross-country skiing
- Club: IL i BUL, Oslo

Lorns Olav Skjemstad (10 March 1940 – 18 February 2024) was a Norwegian cross-country skier. Competing in the 30 km event he won the national title in 1965 and placed 11th at the 1968 Winter Olympics.

He coached the Norwegian national women's cross-country skiing team, and published several works on cross-country skiing.

== Career ==
Born in Inderøy Municipality on 10 March 1940, Skjemstad had his breakthrough in 1965, both nationally and internationally. First, by winning the national title in 30-kilometre (19 mi) race, as well as finishing second at the 50-kilometre (31 mi) race at the Norwegian championships. At the Holmenkollen Ski Festival in 1965, he placed first in the 15-kilometre (9.3 mi) race.

Representing Norway at the FIS Nordic World Ski Championships 1966, he placed 8th at the 30 km. At the Lahti Ski Games 1966 he placed second in the 15 km, and third in the 50 kilometer.

Competing at the 1968 Winter Olympics, he placed 11th at the 30 km. At the Svenska Skidspelen 1968 he placed 7th in the 30 km.

During the 1969 season he studied at the Norwegian School of Sport Sciences. From 1970 to 1972 he coached the Norwegian national women's cross-country skiing team. The team's achievements include winning a bronze medal at the 3 × 5 kilometre relay at the 1972 Winter Olympics.

He was subsequently engaged as coach for the Association for the Promotion of Skiing (Skiforeningen), and educational consultant for the Norwegian Ski Federation. He published several works on cross-country skiing.

Skjemstad settled in Røros Municipality with his family in 1982. He was honoured with Frivillighetsprisen from the municipality of Røros in 2020, for his long-term contributions to voluntary work related to skiing.

Skjemstad died on 18 February 2024, at the age of 83.

== Cross-country skiing results ==
=== Olympic Games ===
Year	Age	15 km	30 km	50 km	4 × 10 km relay
1968	27	—	11	—	—

=== World Championships ===
Year	Age	15 km	30 km	50 km	4 × 10 km relay
1966	25	—	8	—	—

== Selected works ==
- Langrennsboka for turgåere og konkurranseløpere (1972)
