= Christine Nestler =

German skier (born 1940)

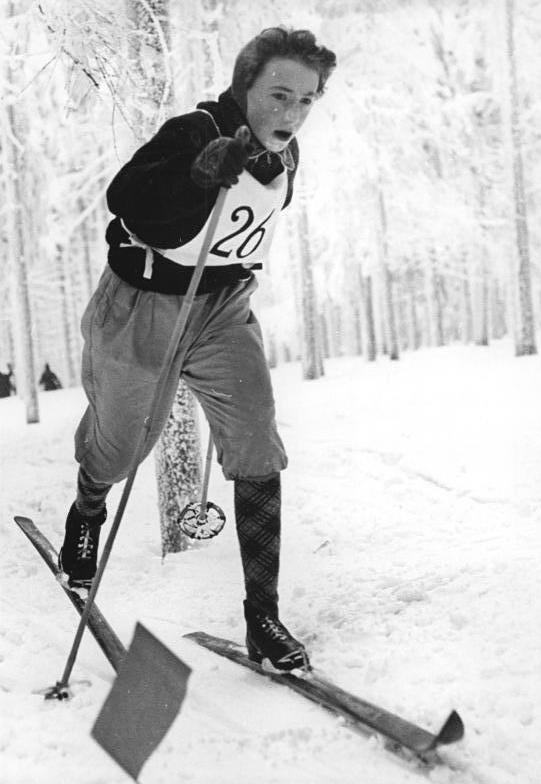
- Christine Nestler in 1956

Personal information
- Nationality: German
- Born: 27 September 1940 (age 85) Geyer, Germany

Sport
- Sport: Cross-country skiing

Christine Nestler (born 27 September 1940) is a German cross-country skier. She competed at the 1964 Winter Olympics and the 1968 Winter Olympics.

== Cross-country skiing results ==
=== Olympic Games ===
Year	Age	5 km	10 km	3 × 5 km relay
1964	23	12	9	6
1968	27	17	13	4

=== World Championships ===
Year	Age	5 km	10 km	3 × 5 km relay
1966	25	—	—	4
