= Olkkonen =

Olkkonen is a Finnish surname. Notable people with the surname include:

- Aate Olkkonen (1877–1949), Finnish politician
- Joonas Olkkonen (born 1976), Finnish sport shooter

== See also ==
- Marjatta Muttilainen-Olkkonen (born 1946), Finnish cross-country skier
