= Marjatta Kajosmaa =

Finnish former cross-country skier (born 1938)

Medal record

Women's cross-country skiing

Representing Finland

Olympic Games
| Silver medal – second place | 1972 Sapporo | 5 km |
| Silver medal – second place | 1972 Sapporo | 3 × 5 km relay |
| Silver medal – second place | 1976 Innsbruck | 4 × 5 km relay |
| Bronze medal – third place | 1972 Sapporo | 10 km |

World Championships
| Silver medal – second place | 1970 Vysoké Tatry | 10 km |
| Bronze medal – third place | 1970 Vysoké Tatry | 3 × 5 km relay |

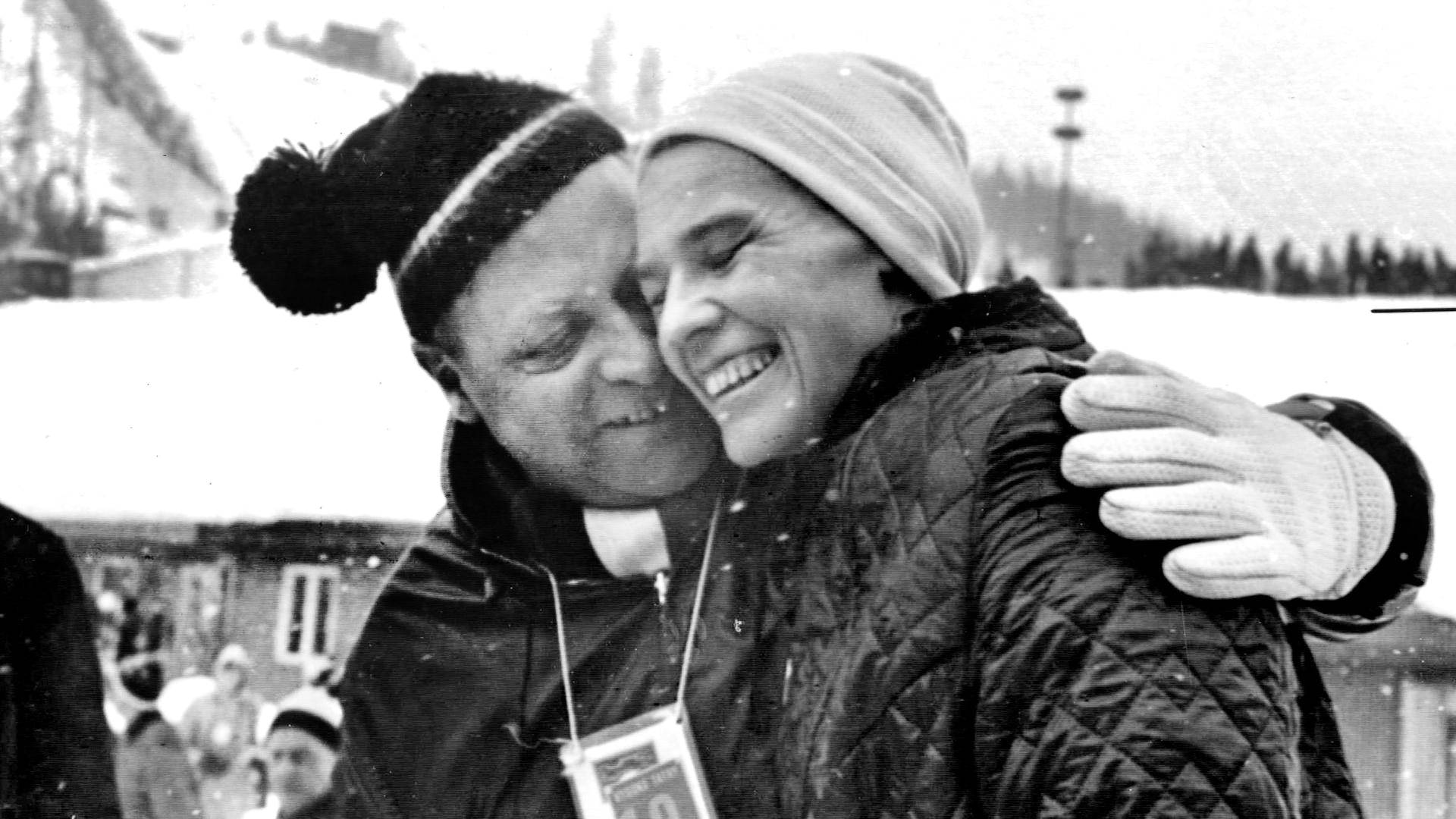
Kajosmaa, after winning second prize in 10 km. To her left, Hannu Koskivuori, the leader of the athletic team.

Ritva Marjatta Kajosmaa (born 3 February 1938 in Vehkalahti) is a Finnish former cross-country skier who competed during the 1970s. She competed in two Winter Olympics, earning a total of four medals. Kajosmaa also competed several times at the Holmenkollen ski festival, winning four times at 10 km (1969, 1971–1973) and three times at 5 km (1969, 1972–1973). Additionally, she won two medals at the 1970 FIS Nordic World Ski Championships with a silver in the 10 km, and a bronze in 3 × 5 km relay.

For her successes in Nordic skiing and at the Holmenkollen, Kajosmaa received the Holmenkollen medal in 1971 (Shared with Berit Mørdre Lammedal and Reidar Hjermstad.). She was the first Finnish woman to ever win the Holmenkollen medal.

== Cross-country skiing results ==
All results are sourced from the International Ski Federation (FIS).

=== Olympic Games ===
- 4 medals – (3 silver, 1 bronze)

| Year | Age | 5 km | 10 km | 3/4 × 5 km relay |
|---|---|---|---|---|
| 1968 | 30 | 5 | 5 | 4 |
| 1972 | 34 | Silver | Bronze | Silver |
| 1976 | 38 | 9 | 11 | Silver |

=== World Championships ===
- 2 medals – (1 silver, 1 bronze)

| Year | Age | 5 km | 10 km | 3/4 × 5 km relay |
|---|---|---|---|---|
| 1970 | 32 | 4 | Silver | Bronze |
| 1974 | 36 | — | — | 4 |

== Sources ==
- Holmenkollen medalists – click Holmenkollmedaljen for downloadable PDF file (in Norwegian)
- Holmenkollen winners since 1892 – click Vinnere for downloadable PDF file (in Norwegian)
