= Bulgaria at the 1968 Winter Olympics =

- IOC code: BUL
- NOC: Bulgarian Olympic Committee
- Website: www.bgolympic.org (in Bulgarian and English)

in Grenoble
- Competitors: 6 in 2 sports
- Medals: Gold 0 Silver 0 Bronze 0 Total 0

Winter Olympics appearances (overview)
- 1936; 1948; 1952; 1956; 1960; 1964; 1968; 1972; 1976; 1980; 1984; 1988; 1992; 1994; 1998; 2002; 2006; 2010; 2014; 2018; 2022; 2026

Bulgaria competed at the 1968 Winter Olympics in Grenoble, France.

== Alpine skiing ==
Men

Athlete	Event	Race 1		Race 2		Total	
Athlete	Event	Time	Rank	Time	Rank	Time	Rank
Petar Angelov	Downhill					2:18.71	63
Petar Angelov	Giant Slalom	1:59.87	67	2:01.96	66	4:01.83	64

Men's slalom

Athlete	Heat 1		Heat 2		Final					
Athlete	Time	Rank	Time	Rank	Time 1	Rank	Time 2	Rank	Total	Rank
Petar Angelov	DNF	–	57.60	1 QF	1:00.72	43	58.07	28	1:58.79	29

== Cross-country skiing ==
Men

Event	Athlete	Race	
Event	Athlete	Time	Rank
15 km	Petar Pankov	50:54.1	25
30 km	Petar Pankov	1'41:42.9	26

Women

Event	Athlete	Race	
Event	Athlete	Time	Rank
5 km	Roza Dimova	19:05.6	33
5 km	Tsvetana Sotirova	18:27.3	31
5 km	Velichka Pandeva	18:23.7	30
5 km	Nadezhda Vasileva	17:58.7	24
10 km	Velichka Pandeva	43:26.3	31
10 km	Roza Dimova	43:18.4	29
10 km	Tsvetana Sotirova	42:16.5	28
10 km	Nadezhda Vasileva	41:25.8	27

Women's 3 x 5 km relay

Athletes	Race	
Athletes	Time	Rank
Velichka Pandeva; Nadezhda Vasileva; Tsvetana Sotirova	1'05:35.7	8
