= Barbara Barthel =

German skier (born 1940)

Personal information
- Nationality: German
- Born: 9 February 1940 (age 85) Breslau, Nazi Germany

Sport
- Sport: Cross-country skiing

Barbara Barthel (born 9 February 1940) is a German cross-country skier. She competed in three events at the 1968 Winter Olympics.

== Cross-country skiing results ==
=== Olympic Games ===
Year	Age	5 km	10 km	3 × 5 km relay
1968	28	29	DNF	7
