= Anna Gębala-Duraj =

Polish cross-country skier

Personal information
- Nationality: Polish
- Born: 25 May 1949 (age 76) Cięcina, Poland

Sport
- Sport: Cross-country skiing

Anna Gębala-Duraj (born 25 May 1949) is a Polish cross-country skier. She competed at the 1968, 1972 and the 1976 Winter Olympics.

== Cross-country skiing results ==
=== Olympic Games ===
Year	Age	5 km	10 km	3/4 × 5 km relay
1968	19	26	30	—
1972	23	29	15	7
1976	27	31	27	8
