= Olyunin =

Olyunin (Russian: Олюнин) is a Russian masculine surname, its feminine counterpart is Olyunina. Notable people with the surname include:

- Nikolay Olyunin (born 1991), Russian snowboarder
- Alevtina Olyunina (1942–2025), Russian cross-country skier
