= Alevtina Olyunina =

Soviet cross-country skier (1942–2025)

Medal record

Women's cross-country skiing

Representing Soviet Union

Olympic Games
Gold medal – first place	1972 Sapporo	3 × 5 km relay
Silver medal – second place	1972 Sapporo	10 km

World Championships
Gold medal – first place	1970 Vysoké Tatry	10 km
Gold medal – first place	1970 Vysoké Tatry	3 × 5 km relay

Alevtina Sergeyevna Olyunina (Russian: Алевти́на Серге́евна Олю́нина; 15 August 1942 – 18 November 2025) was a Soviet cross-country skier who competed during the early 1970s for Trud Voluntary Sports Society. She was on the Olympic champion team and a silver medalist at the 1972 Olympics.

== Biography ==
Olyunina was born in Pchyolkino, Kostroma Oblast, Russian SFSR, USSR on 15 August 1942. She won two medals at the 1972 Winter Olympics in Sapporo with a gold in the 3 × 5 km relay and a silver in the 10 km.

She also won two medals at the 1970 FIS Nordic World Ski Championships with golds both in the 10 km and the 3 × 5 km relay events.

Olyunina died on 18 November 2025, at the age of 83.

== Cross-country skiing results ==
All results are sourced from the International Ski Federation (FIS).

=== Olympic Games ===
- 2 medals – (1 gold, 1 silver)

Year	Age	5 km	10 km	3 × 5 km relay
1968	25	20	11	—
1972	29	4	2nd	1st

=== World Championships ===
- 2 medals – (2 gold)

Year	Age	5 km	10 km	3 × 5 km relay
1970	27	—	1st	1st
