= Poland at the 1968 Winter Olympics =

- IOC code: POL
- NOC: Polish Olympic Committee
- Website: www.pkol.pl (in Polish)

in Grenoble
- Competitors: 31 (23 men, 8 women) in 7 sports
- Flag bearers: Stanisław Szczepaniak, Biathlon
- Medals: Gold 0 Silver 0 Bronze 0 Total 0

Winter Olympics appearances (overview)
- 1924; 1928; 1932; 1936; 1948; 1952; 1956; 1960; 1964; 1968; 1972; 1976; 1980; 1984; 1988; 1992; 1994; 1998; 2002; 2006; 2010; 2014; 2018; 2022; 2026

Poland competed at the 1968 Winter Olympics in Grenoble, France.

== Alpine skiing ==
Men

Athlete	Event	Race 1		Race 2		Total	
Athlete	Event	Time	Rank	Time	Rank	Time	Rank
Ryszard Ćwikła	Downhill					2:10.63	48
Andrzej Bachleda	Downhill					2:05.48	26
Ryszard Ćwikła	Giant Slalom	1:51.79	40	1:54.17	41	3:45.96	37
Andrzej Bachleda	Giant Slalom	1:46.46	14	1:49.25	13	3:35.71	13

Men's slalom

Athlete	Heat 1		Heat 2		Final					
Athlete	Time	Rank	Time	Rank	Time 1	Rank	Time 2	Rank	Total	Rank
Ryszard Ćwikła	DSQ	–	54.47	1 QF	53.69	33	53.11	21	1:46.80	21
Andrzej Bachleda	53.48	1 QF	–	–	49.88	5	50.73	6	1:40.61	6

== Biathlon ==
Men

Event	Athlete	Time	Penalties	Adjusted time ^{1}	Rank
20 km	Józef Gąsienica-Sobczak	DNF	–	DNF	–
20 km	Józef Stopka	1.22:17.7	12	1'34:17.7	48
20 km	Stanisław Łukaszczyk	1'16:28.1	4	1'20:28.1	8
20 km	Stanisław Szczepaniak	1'17:56.8	1	1'18:56.8	4

^{1} One minute added per close miss (a hit in the outer ring), two minutes added per complete miss.

Men's 4 x 7.5 km relay

Athletes	Race		
Athletes	Misses ^{2}	Time	Rank
Józef Rózak; Andrzej Fiedor; Stanisław Łukaszczyk; Stanisław Szczepaniak	4	2'20:19.6	4

^{2} A penalty loop of 200 metres had to be skied per missed target.

== Cross-country skiing ==
Men

Event	Athlete	Race	
Event	Athlete	Time	Rank
15 km	Józef Rysula	50:38.5	21
50 km	Józef Rysula	2'35:30.9	21

Women

Event	Athlete	Race	
Event	Athlete	Time	Rank
5 km	Anna Gębala-Duraj	18:02.7	26
5 km	Józefa Czerniawska-Pęksa	17:56.5	23
5 km	Weronika Budny	17:38.2	19
5 km	Stefania Biegun	17:03.4	9
10 km	Anna Gębala-Duraj	43:23.8	30
10 km	Józefa Czerniawska-Pęksa	40:59.9	25
10 km	Weronika Budny	40:09.4	21
10 km	Stefania Biegun	39:55.4	19

Women's 3 x 5 km relay

Athletes	Race	
Athletes	Time	Rank
Weronika Budny; Józefa Czerniawska-Pęksa; Stefania Biegun	59:04.7	5

== Figure skating ==
Pairs

Athletes	SP	FS	Points	Places	Rank
Janina Poremska; Piotr Scypa	13	14	274.1	120	14

== Luge ==
Men

Athlete	Run 1		Run 2		Run 3		Total	
Athlete	Time	Rank	Time	Rank	Time	Rank	Time	Rank
Lucjan Kudzia	59.27	26	58.46	10	58.18	8	2:55.91	13
Tadeusz Radwan	59.03	21	59.01	15	59.19	22	2:57.23	22
Jerzy Wojnar	58.16	12	58.38	8	58.08	7	2:54.62	8
Zbigniew Gawior	57.55	4	58.35	6	57.61	3	2:53.51	4

(Men's) Doubles

Athletes	Run 1		Run 2		Total	
Athletes	Time	Rank	Time	Rank	Time	Rank
Zbigniew Gawior; Ryszard Gawior	49.01	7	48.84	4	1:37.85	6
Lucjan Kudzia; Stanisław Paczka	49.09	9	49.08	7	1:38.17	9

Women

Athlete	Run 1		Run 2		Run 3		Total	
Athlete	Time	Rank	Time	Rank	Time	Rank	Time	Rank
Anna Mąka	49.69	8	50.05	6	50.66	6	2:30.40	7
Jadwiga Damse	49.64	6	50.43	11	50.08	1	2:30.15	5
Helena Macher	49.55	5	50.02	5	50.48	4	2:30.05	4

== Nordic combined ==
Events:

- normal hill ski jumping (Three jumps, best two counted and shown here.)
- 15 km cross-country skiing

Athlete	Event	Ski Jumping				Cross-country			Total	
Athlete	Event	Distance 1	Distance 2	Points	Rank	Time	Points	Rank	Points	Rank
Jan Kawulok	Individual	70.0	70.5	200.4	18	52:32.7	187.51	25	387.91	20
Józef Gąsienica Daniel	Individual	72.0	68.0	203.8	16	51:10.1	203.96	18	407.76	15
Erwin Fiedor	Individual	74.0	74.0	234.3	3	54:48.7	161.63	36	395.93	18
Józef Gąsienica	Individual	72.5	71.5	217.7	8	50:34.5	211.08	11	428.78	6

== Ski jumping ==
Athlete	Event	Jump 1		Jump 2		Total	
Athlete	Event	Distance	Points	Distance	Points	Points	Rank
Józef Kocjan	Normal hill	72.5	95.3	71.0	96.9	189.0	35
Józef Przybyła	Normal hill	72.5	96.8	69.0	93.7	193.7	27
Ryszard Witke	Normal hill	73.5	101.9	68.5	88.4	190.3	32
Erwin Fiedor	Normal hill	74.5	102.5	67.5	89.3	191.8	30
Józef Kocjan	Large hill	80.0	72.4	90.5	93.1	159.0	45
Ryszard Witke	Large hill	88.5	89.8	88.0	89.6	179.4	31
Erwin Fiedor	Large hill	92.0	96.2	84.0	83.5	179.7	30
Józef Przybyła	Large hill	98.0	106.1	88.0	86.6	199.2	14
