= Renate Fischer (cross-country skier) =

East German cross-country skier (born 1943)

Medal record

Women's cross-country skiing

Representing East Germany

World Championships
Silver medal – second place	1970 Vysoké Tatry	3 × 5 km relay

Renate Fischer (born 1 July 1943) is a former East German cross-country skier who competed in the late 1960s and early 1970s. She earned a silver medal in the 3 × 5 km relay at the 1970 FIS Nordic World Ski Championships in Vysoké Tatry. She also competed at the 1968 Winter Olympics and the 1972 Winter Olympics.

== Cross-country skiing results ==
=== Olympic Games ===
Year	Age	5 km	10 km	3 × 5 km relay
1968	24	14	16	6
1972	28	14	9	5

=== World Championships ===
- 1 medal – (1 silver)

Year	Age	5 km	10 km	3 × 5 km relay
1970	26	—	5	Silver
