= Endler =

Endler is a surname. Notable people with the surname include:

- Adolf Endler (1930–2009), German lyric poet, essayist, and prose author
- Christiane Endler (born 1991), Chilean football goalkeeper
- John Endler (born 1947), ethologist and evolutionary biologist
- Michaela Endler (born 1945), German cross-country skier
