= Rita Achkina =

Belarusian cross-country skier

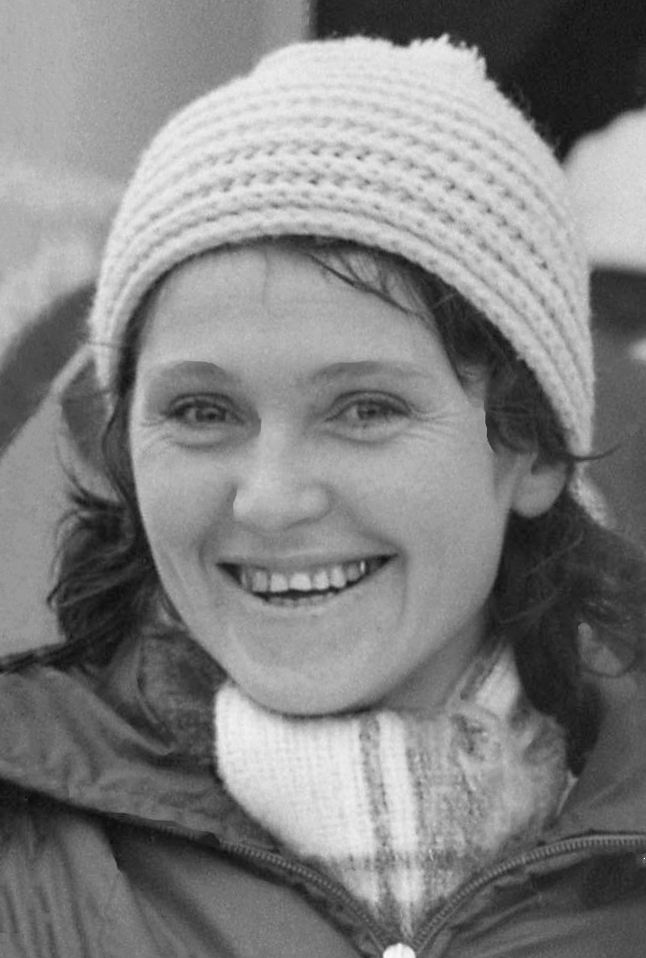
- Achkina at the 1966 World Championships

Personal information
- Born: 1 February 1938 (age 88) Mogilev, Byelorussian SSR, Soviet Union
- Height: 168 cm (5 ft 6 in)
- Weight: 63 kg (139 lb)

Sport
- Sport: Cross-country skiing
- Club: CSKA Moscow
Medal record
Women's cross-country skiing
Representing the Soviet Union
Olympic Games
Bronze medal – third place	1968 Grenoble	3 × 5 km relay
World Championships
Gold medal – first place	1966 Oslo	3 × 5 km relay
Bronze medal – third place	1966 Oslo	5 km

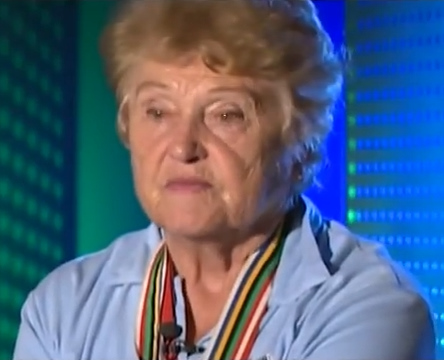
Achkina in 2013

Rita Nikolayevna Achkina (Russian: Рита Николаевна Ачкина; born 1 February 1938) is a retired Belarusian cross-country skier. In 1965 she won the 5 km, 10 km and 3 × 5 km relay events at the Soviet championships. Next year she earned two medals at the 1966 FIS Nordic World Ski Championships with a gold in the 3 × 5 km relay and a bronze in the 5 km. She competed in these two events at the 1968 Winter Olympics and won a bronze medal in the relay, placing sixth individually. After retiring from competitions she worked as elementary school teacher.

== Cross-country skiing results ==
All results are sourced from the International Ski Federation (FIS).

=== Olympic Games ===
- 1 medal – (1 bronze)

Year	Age	5 km	10 km	3 × 5 km relay
1964	26	10	—	—
1968	30	6	—	Bronze

=== World Championships ===
- 2 medals – (1 gold, 1 bronze)

Year	Age	5 km	10 km	3 × 5 km relay
1966	28	Bronze	8	Gold
