= Weronika Budny =

Polish cross-country skier

Personal information
- Nationality: Polish
- Born: 30 October 1941 (age 84) Wiązownica, Poland

Sport
- Sport: Cross-country skiing

Weronika Krystyna Budny (born 30 October 1941, maiden name Stempak) is a Polish cross-country skier. She competed at the 1964, 1968 and the 1972 Winter Olympics.

== Cross-country skiing results ==
=== Olympic Games ===
Year	Age	5 km	10 km	3 × 5 km relay
1964	22	27	—	—
1968	26	19	21	5
1972	30	13	11	7

=== World Championships ===
Year	Age	5 km	10 km	3 × 5 km relay
1962	20	—	—	4
1966	24	—	—	7
