= Stefania Biegun =

Polish cross-country skier

Personal information
- Nationality: Polish
- Born: 11 August 1935 Wieprz, Poland
- Died: 10 December 2016 (aged 81) Wetlina, Poland

Sport
- Sport: Cross-country skiing

Stefania Biegun (11 August 1935 – 10 December 2016) was a Polish cross-country skier. She competed at the 1960, 1964 and the 1968 Winter Olympics.

== Cross-country skiing results ==
=== Olympic Games ===
Year	Age	5 km	10 km	3 × 5 km relay
1960	24	—N/a	13	4
1964	28	14	18	7
1968	32	9	19	5

=== World Championships ===
Year	Age	5 km	10 km	3 × 5 km relay
1958	22	—N/a	16	4
1962	26	—	—	4
1966	30	—	—	7
