= Gudrun Schmidt =

German cross-country skier (born 1941)

Personal information
- Nationality: German
- Born: 7 February 1941 (age 84) Zeulenroda, Germany

Sport
- Sport: Cross-country skiing

Gudrun Schmidt (born 7 February 1941) is a German former cross-country skier. She competed in three events at the 1968 Winter Olympics, representing East Germany.

== Cross-country skiing results ==
=== Olympic Games ===
Year	Age	5 km	10 km	3 × 5 km relay
1968	27	13	14	6
