= Monika Mrklas =

German former cross-country skier and racing cyclist

Monika Mrklas (born 26 May 1942 in Coswig, Saxony) is a German former cross-country skier and racing cyclist. She competed in the 1968 Winter Olympics and in the 1972 Winter Olympics. She won the German National Road Race Championship in 1968.

== Cross-country skiing results ==
=== Olympic Games ===
Year	Age	5 km	10 km	3 × 5 km relay
1968	25	17	20	7
1972	29	5	DNF	4

=== World Championships ===
Year	Age	5 km	10 km	; 3 × 5 km relay
1970	27	—	—	6
