= Józefa Czerniawska-Pęksa =

Polish cross-country skier

Personal information
- Nationality: Polish
- Born: 31 January 1937 (age 88) Zakopane, Poland

Sport
- Sport: Cross-country skiing

Józefa Czerniawska-Pęksa (born 31 January 1937) is a Polish cross-country skier. She competed at the 1956, 1960 and the 1968 Winter Olympics.

== Cross-country skiing results ==
=== Olympic Games ===
Year	Age	5 km	10 km	3 × 5 km relay
1956	19	—N/a	17	5
1960	23	—N/a	14	4
1968	31	23	25	5

=== World Championships ===
Year	Age	5 km	10 km	3 × 5 km relay
1958	21	—N/a	12	4
1962	25	—	—	4
1966	29	—	—	7
