= Aslaug Dahl =

Norwegian cross-country skier

Olympic medal record

Women's cross-country skiing

Representing Norway
Bronze medal – third place	1972 Sapporo	3 × 5 km relay

Aslaug Dahl (born March 23, 1949) is a Norwegian former cross-country skier who competed during the early 1970s. She won a bronze medal in the 3 × 5 km relay at the 1972 Winter Olympics in Sapporo.

== Cross-country skiing results ==
=== Olympic Games ===
Year	Age	5 km	10 km	3 × 5 km relay
1972	22	8	6	Bronze

=== World Championships ===
Year	Age	5 km	10 km	3/4 × 5 km relay
1970	20	28	14	4
1974	24	—	16	6
