= Cross-country skiing at the 1968 Winter Olympics – Women's 3 × 5 kilometre relay =

Cross-country skiing at the Olympics

Women's 3 × 5 kilometre relay at the X Olympic Winter Games
- Cross-country skiing
- Venue: Cross Country Skiing Stadium
- Date: 16 February 1968
- Competitors: 24 from 8 nations
- Winning time: 57:30.0

Medalists
1st place, gold medalist(s)		Inger Aufles; Babben Enger; Berit Mørdre Lammedal	Norway
2nd place, silver medalist(s)		Barbro Martinsson; Toini Gustafsson; Britt Strandberg	Sweden
3rd place, bronze medalist(s)		Alevtina Kolchina; Rita Achkina; Galina Kulakova	Soviet Union

The Women's 3 × 5 kilometre relay cross-country skiing event was part of the cross-country skiing programme at the 1968 Winter Olympics, in Grenoble, France. It was the fourth appearance of the event. The competition was held on 16 February 1968, at Autrans.

== Results ==
Rank	Name	Country	Time
1	Inger Aufles; Babben Enger; Berit Mørdre Lammedal	Norway	57:30.0
2	Barbro Martinsson; Toini Gustafsson; Britt Strandberg	Sweden	57:51.0
3	Alevtina Kolchina; Rita Achkina; Galina Kulakova	Soviet Union	58:13.6
4	Senja Pusula; Marjatta Muttilainen-Olkkonen; Marjatta Kajosmaa	Finland	58:45.1
5	Weronika Budny; Józefa Czerniawska-Pęksa; Stefania Biegun	Poland	59:04.7
6	Renate Fischer-Köhler; Gudrun Schmidt; Christine Nestler	East Germany	59:33.9
7	Michaela Endler; Barbara Barthel; Monika Mrklas	West Germany	1:01:49.3
8	Velichka Pandeva; Nadezhda Vasileva; Tsvetana Sotirova	Bulgaria	1:05:35.7
