= Erling Enger =

Norwegian painter (1899–1990)

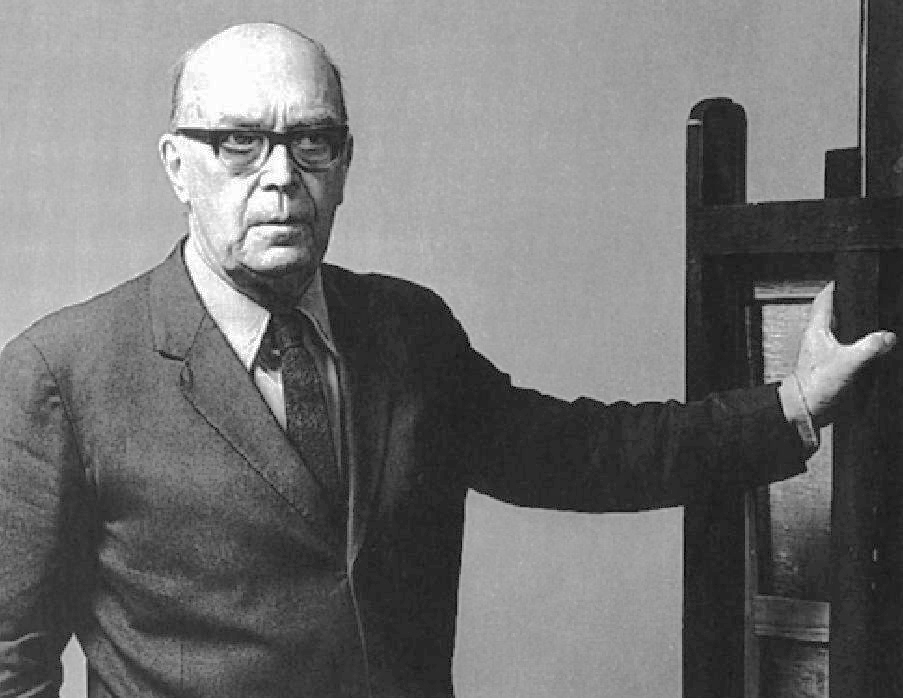
Erling Enger

Erling Enger (17 May 1899 – 12 February 1990) was a Norwegian painter. He was born in Fåberg Municipality, Norway. Among his paintings at the National Gallery of Norway are Vekstring svinger lua from 1940, Gårdsgutten from 1943, and Familien from 1948. He has been portrayed with busts by Dyre Vaa and by Ragnhild Butenschøn. His daughter Babben Enger-Damon became an Olympic champion in cross-country skiing.
