= Alois Kälin =

Swiss Nordic skier

Medal record

Men's Nordic skiing

Representing Switzerland

Olympic Games
Silver medal – second place	1968 Grenoble	Nordic combined
Bronze medal – third place	1972 Sapporo	Cross country 4 x 10 km

World Championships
Bronze medal – third place	1966 Oslo	Nordic combined

Alois "Wisel" Kälin (born 13 April 1939) is a former Swiss Nordic skier who competed in the 1960s and 1970s. He won a Nordic combined silver at the 1968 Winter Olympics in Grenoble and a bronze in the 4 x 10 km cross-country skiing relay at the 1972 Winter Olympics in Sapporo. Additionally he won a bronze medal in the Nordic combined at the 1966 FIS Nordic World Ski Championships in Oslo.

Kälin was the first Swiss to win a Winter Olympic medal in Nordic skiing, earning his award on 11 February 1968, four days before his fellow countryman Josef Haas would earn a bronze in the 50 km cross country event. He is also the last person to earn medals in both cross-country skiing and the Nordic combined at the Winter Olympics.
