= Barbro Martinsson =

Swedish cross-country skier

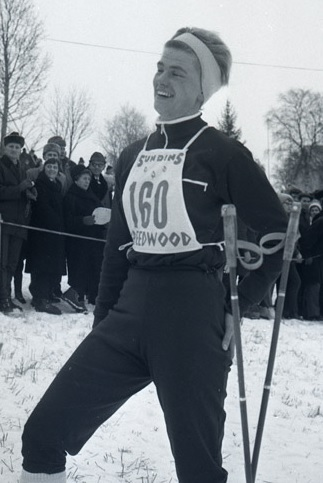
- Barbro Martinsson in the 1960s

Personal information
- Full name: Barbro Martinsson
- Born: 16 August 1935 (age 90) Valbo, Gästrikland, Sweden
- Height: 172 cm (5 ft 8 in)

Sport
- Sport: Skiing
- Club: Skellefteå SK
Medal record
Women's cross-country skiing
Representing Sweden
Event	1st	2nd	3rd
Olympic Games	0	2	0
World Championships	0	1	1
Total	0	3	1
Olympic Games
Silver medal – second place	1964 Innsbruck	3 × 5 km relay
Silver medal – second place	1968 Grenoble	3 × 5 km relay
World Championships
Silver medal – second place	1962 Zakopane	3 × 5 km relay
Bronze medal – third place	1966 Oslo	3 × 5 km relay

Barbro Martinsson (born 16 August 1935) is a former Swedish cross-country skier who competed during the 1960s. Born in Valbo, she won two silver medals in the 3 × 5 km relay at the 1964 Winter Olympics and the 1968 Winter Olympics. Martinsson finished fourth in the 1968 Winter Olympics in both 5 km and 10 km.

She also won two medals in the 3 × 5 km relay at the FIS Nordic World Ski Championships with a silver in 1962 and a bronze in 1966.

Martinsson also won the 10 km event at the Holmenkollen ski festival in 1964.

In total she has won 57 district championships in different sports, including handball.

== Cross-country skiing results ==
All results are sourced from the International Ski Federation (FIS).

=== Olympic Games ===
- 2 medals – (2 silver)

Year	Age	5 km	10 km	3 × 5 km relay
1956	20	—N/a	14	—
1960	24	—N/a	7	—
1964	28	7	11	Silver
1968	32	4	4	Silver

=== World Championships ===
- 2 medals – (1 silver, 1 bronze)

Year	Age	5 km	10 km	3 × 5 km relay
1958	22	—N/a	15	—
1962	26	—	6	Silver
1966	30	7	6	Bronze
