= Paavo Lukkariniemi =

Finnish ski jumper

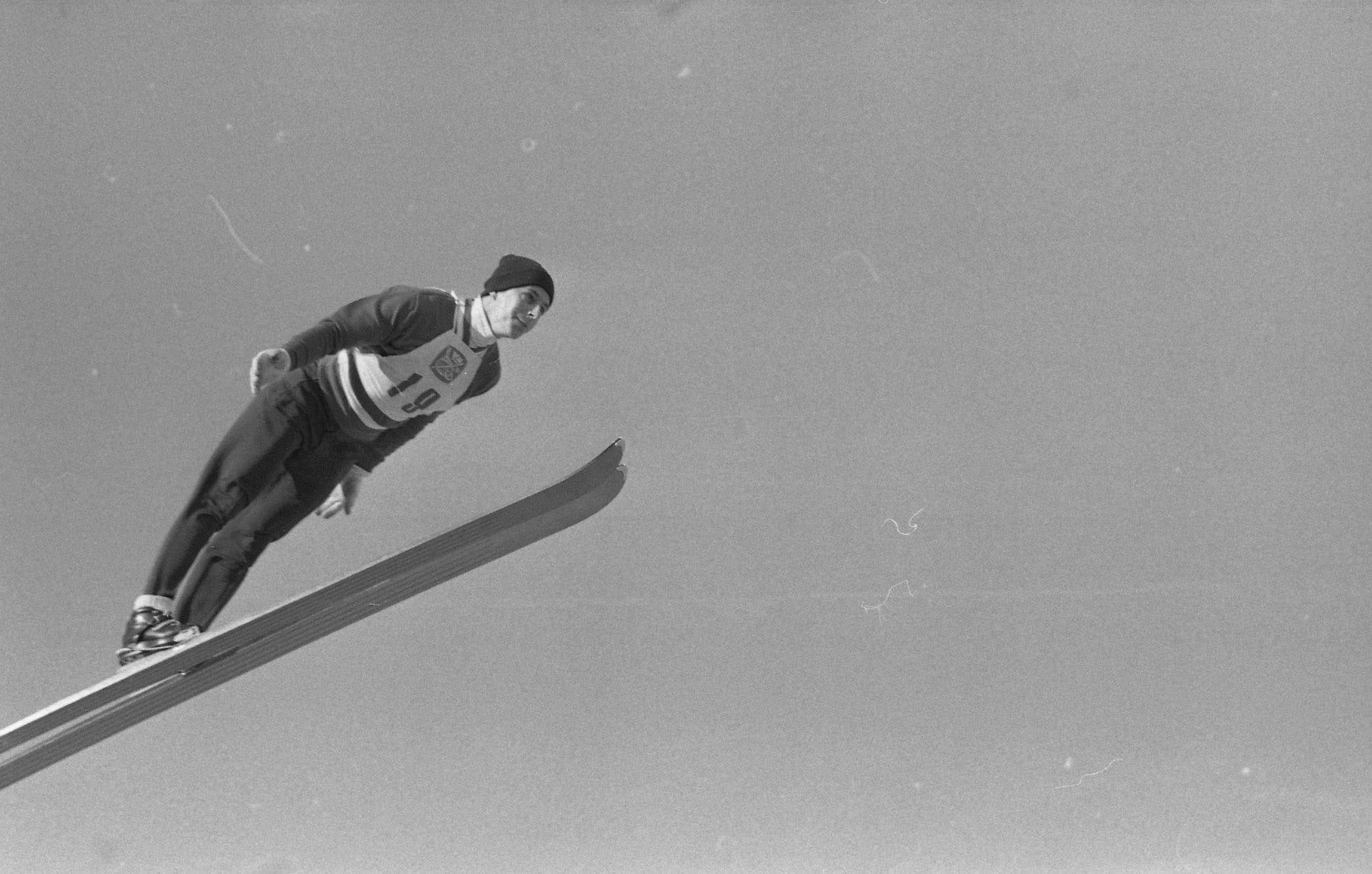
- Lukkariniemi in 1966

Medal record

Men's ski jumping

World Championships
Bronze medal – third place	1966 Oslo	Individual normal hill

Paavo Lukkariniemi (born April 14, 1941 in Ylitornio) is a Finnish former ski jumper who competed in the mid-1960s. He won a bronze medal in the individual normal hill at the 1966 FIS Nordic World Ski Championships in Oslo.

Lukkariniemi's lone victory was in the normal hill event at Garmisch-Partenkirchen in 1966.
