= Gjermund Eggen =

Norwegian cross-country skier (1941–2019)

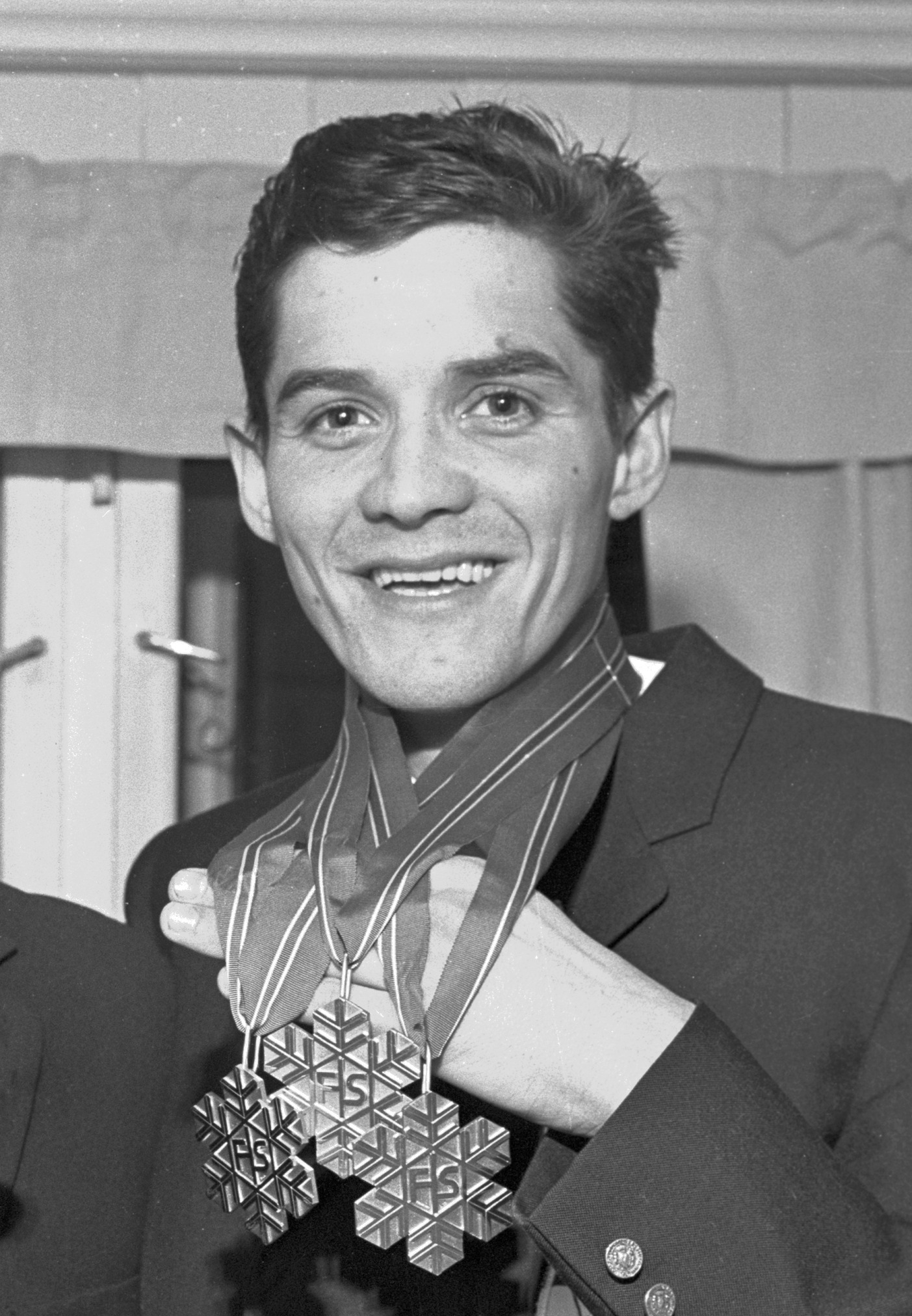
- Eggen after the 1966 World Championships

Personal information
- Born: 5 June 1941 Engerdal, Reichskommissariat Norwegen (today Norway)
- Died: 6 May 2019 (aged 77) Elverum, Norway

Sport
- Sport: Cross-country skiing
- Club: Engerdal SK
Medal record
Men's cross-country skiing
Representing Norway
World Championships
Gold medal – first place	1966 Oslo	15 km
Gold medal – first place	1966 Oslo	50 km
Gold medal – first place	1966 Oslo	4 × 10 km relay

Gjermund Eggen (5 June 1941 – 6 May 2019) was a Norwegian cross-country skier who won three gold medals at the 1966 FIS Nordic World Ski Championships. The championships were held in Oslo in conjunction with the Holmenkollen ski festival, and so Eggen's medals also counted as Holmenkollen victories. He was awarded the Holmenkollen medal in 1968 (shared with King Olav V, Assar Rönnlund, and Bjørn Wirkola). He competed at the 1968 Winter Olympics in the 30 km event, but finished only 34th. Eggen died in Elverum at age 77.

== Cross-country skiing results ==
All results are sourced from the International Ski Federation (FIS).

=== Olympic Games ===
Year	Age	15 km	30 km	50 km	4 × 10 km relay
1968	26	—	34	—	—

=== World Championships ===
- 3 medals – (3 gold)

Year	Age	15 km	30 km	50 km	4 × 10 km relay
1966	24	Gold	16	Gold	Gold

== Personal life ==
Eggen was born in Engerdal Municipality to farmer and forest worker Per Eggen and Sina Heggeriset. He married Anne Dagmar Andreassen in 1969.

== Selected works ==
- 3 x gull. Gjermund Eggen forteller til Stein Berg. 1966. (autobiography)
- Engerdalsvalsen (music album 1967)
