= Alevtina Kolchina =

Soviet cross-country skier (1930–2022)

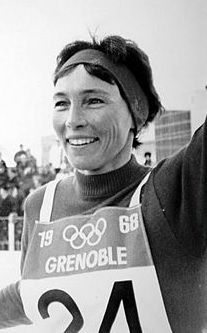
- Kolchina at the 1968 Winter Olympics

Personal information
- Born: 11 November 1930 Pavlovsk village, Perm Oblast, Russian SFSR, Soviet Union
- Died: 1 March 2022 (aged 91)
- Height: 162 cm (5 ft 4 in)
- Weight: 56 kg (123 lb)

Sport
- Sport: Cross-country skiing
- Club: Iskra Leningrad; Burevestnik Moscow; Dynamo Moscow
Medal record
Women's cross-country skiing
Representing the Soviet Union
Olympic Games
Gold medal – first place	1964 Innsbruck	3 × 5 km relay
Silver medal – second place	1956 Cortina d'Ampezzo	3 × 5 km relay
Bronze medal – third place	1964 Innsbruck	5 km
Bronze medal – third place	1968 Grenoble	5 km
Bronze medal – third place	1968 Grenoble	3 × 5 km relay
World Championships
Gold medal – first place	1958 Lahti	10 km
Gold medal – first place	1958 Lahti	3 × 5 km relay
Gold medal – first place	1962 Zakopane	5 km
Gold medal – first place	1962 Zakopane	10 km
Gold medal – first place	1962 Zakopane	3 × 5 km relay
Gold medal – first place	1966 Oslo	5 km
Gold medal – first place	1966 Oslo	3 × 5 km relay
Silver medal – second place	1966 Oslo	10 km

Alevtina Pavlovna Kolchina (Russian: Алевти́на Па́вловна Ко́лчина alternate spelling: Alevtina Koltsjina; 11 November 1930 – 1 March 2022) was a Soviet cross-country skier who competed during the 1950s and 1960s for Burevestnik and later for Dynamo sports societies. She competed in four Winter Olympics, earning a total of five medals. Kolchina also competed several times at the Holmenkollen ski festival, winning three times at 10 km (1961–1963) and once at 5 km (1966).

== Personal life and death ==
Kolchina was born in the village of Pavlovsk, Ochyorsky District, Perm Oblast, and took up skiing at the age of 13. She was married to four-time Olympic cross country medalist Pavel Kolchin until his death in 2010. In 1973, the family moved to Otepää, where Kolchins worked as national cross-country ski coaches, functionaries and consultants. Their son Fjodor Koltšin placed 15th in the Nordic combined at the 1980 Winter Olympics, competing for the Soviet Union (Estonia restored its independence in 1991.).

Kolchina died on 1 March 2022, at the age of 91.

== Career ==
Kolchina's biggest success was at the FIS Nordic World Ski Championships, where she won three medals in 10 km (golds in 1958 and 1962, silver in 1966), three medals in the 3×5 km relay (golds in 1958, 1962, and 1966), and two medals in 5 km (golds in 1962 and 1966). Kolchina also was Soviet champion in women's cross country skiing thirteen times in her career.

For her successes in the world championships and at the Holmenkollen, Kolchina received the Holmenkollen medal in 1963 (shared with her husband, Astrid Sandvik, and Torbjørn Yggeseth). Kolchina is the third woman, first Soviet/Russian, and first female Nordic skier to ever win the Holmenkollen medal. Kolchina and her husband are the first husband and wife team to ever win the Holmenkollen Medal.

== Cross-country skiing results ==
All results are sourced from the International Ski Federation (FIS).

=== Olympic Games ===
- Five medals – (one gold, one silver, three bronze)

Year	Age	5 km	10 km	3 × 5 km relay
1956	25	—N/a	4	Silver
1960	29	—N/a	4	—
1964	33	Bronze	7	Gold
1968	37	Bronze	7	Bronze

=== World Championships ===
- 8 medals – (7 gold, 1 silver)

Year	Age	5 km	10 km	3 × 5 km relay
1954	23	—N/a	5	—
1958	27	—N/a	Gold	Gold
1962	31	Gold	Gold	Gold
1966	35	Gold	Silver	Gold
