= Michaela Endler =

German cross-country skier (born 1945)

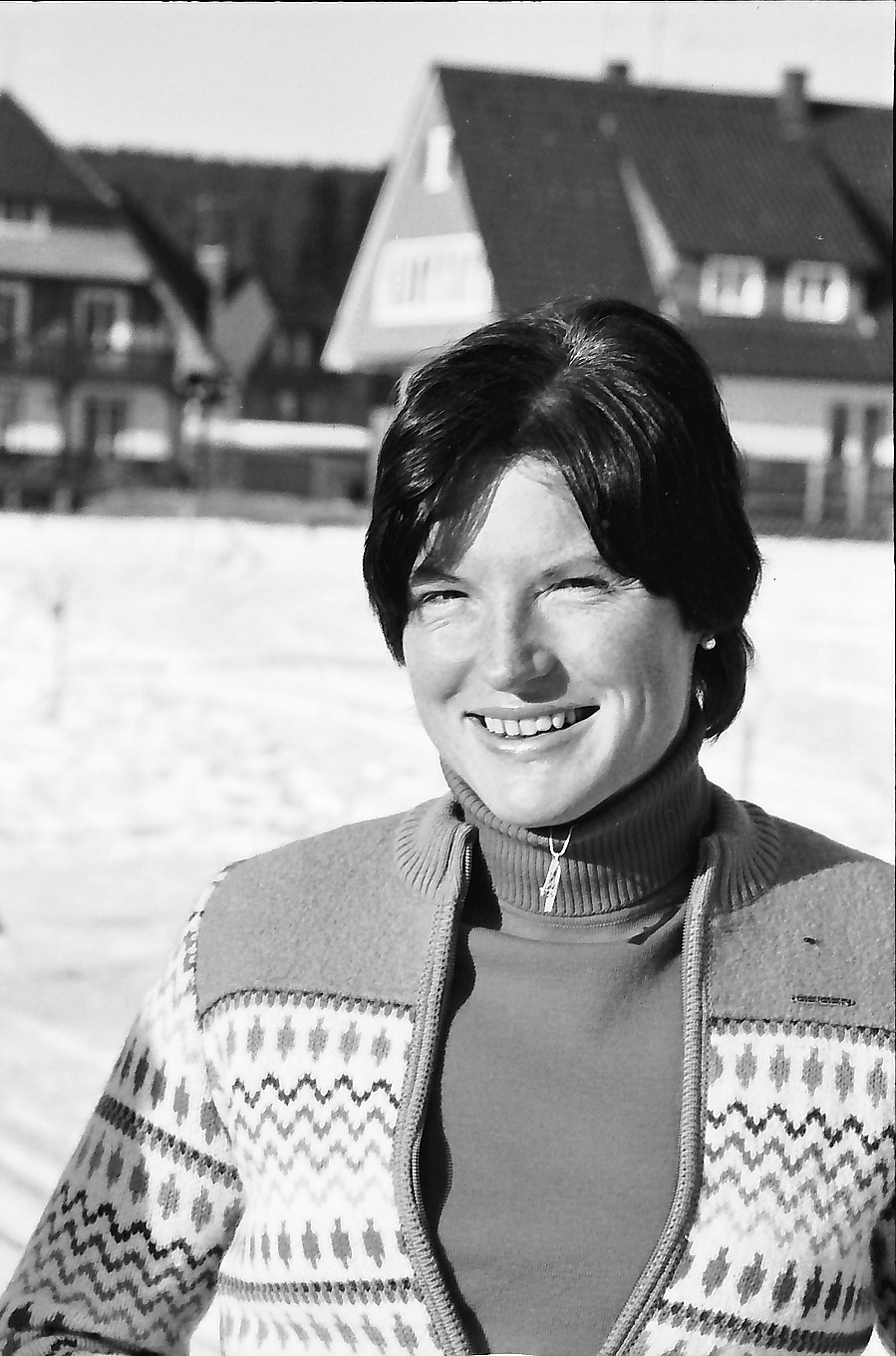
Image of Michaela Endler

Michaela Endler (born 20 December 1945) is a German former cross-country skier who competed in the 1968 Winter Olympics and in the 1972 Winter Olympics.

== Cross-country skiing results ==
=== Olympic Games ===
Year	Age	5 km	10 km	3/4 × 5 km relay
1968	22	25	26	7
1972	26	11	17	4
1976	30	21	25	—

=== World Championships ===
Year	Age	5 km	10 km	3 × 5 km relay
1970	24	5	—	6
