= Galina Kulakova =

Soviet cross-country skier

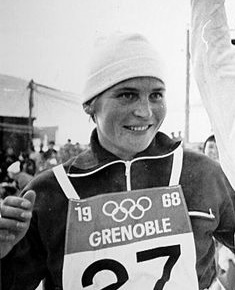
- Kulakova at the 1968 Winter Olympics

Personal information
- Full name: Galina Alexeyevna Kulakova
- Nationality: Soviet Union
- Born: 29 April 1942 (age 84) Logachi, Udmurtia, Russian SFSR, Soviet Union

Sport
- Sport: Skiing
- Club: Trud Prokofyevsk; Trud Izhevsk

World Cup career
- Seasons: 1 – (1982)
- Indiv. starts: 3
- Indiv. podiums: 0
- Team starts: 1
- Team podiums: 1
- Team wins: 0
- Overall titles: 0 – (22nd in 1982)
Medal record
Women's cross-country skiing
Representing the Soviet Union
Olympic Games
Gold medal – first place	1972 Sapporo	5 km
Gold medal – first place	1972 Sapporo	10 km
Gold medal – first place	1972 Sapporo	3 × 5 km relay
Gold medal – first place	1976 Innsbruck	4 × 5 km relay
Silver medal – second place	1968 Grenoble	5 km
Silver medal – second place	1980 Lake Placid	4 × 5 km relay
Bronze medal – third place	1968 Grenoble	3 × 5 km relay
Bronze medal – third place	1976 Innsbruck	10 km
Disqualified	1976 Innsbruck	5 km
World Championships
Gold medal – first place	1970 Vysoké Tatry	5 km
Gold medal – first place	1970 Vysoké Tatry	3 × 5 km relay
Gold medal – first place	1974 Falun	5 km
Gold medal – first place	1974 Falun	10 km
Gold medal – first place	1974 Falun	4 × 5 km relay
Silver medal – second place	1980 Falun	20 km
Silver medal – second place	1982 Oslo	4 × 5 km relay
Bronze medal – third place	1970 Vysoké Tatry	10 km
Bronze medal – third place	1978 Lahti	4 × 5 km relay

Galina Alexeyevna Kulakova (Russian: Галина Алексеевна Кулакова, born 29 April 1942) is a Soviet-Russian former cross-country skier, arguably the best skier on distances shorter than 10 km in the early 1970s. She won four Olympic golds, two individual in 1972 and two relay golds in 1972 and 1976. She was the most successful athlete at the 1972 Winter Olympics, along with Ard Schenk of the Netherlands. Competing in the World Championships, she won three individual golds, two in 1974 and one in 1970, and also two relay golds in those years. Kulakova also won the 10 km event at the Holmenkollen ski festival in 1970 and 1979. Galina Kulakova was also 39 times Champion of the USSR between 1969 and 1981.

For her achievements she was awarded the Order of Lenin and the Order of the Badge of Honour. She was also awarded the silver Olympic Order in 1984 by the International Olympic Committee President Juan Antonio Samaranch. Galina Kulakova ended her sports career in 1982.

== Drug controversy ==
At the 1976 Winter Olympics in Innsbruck, Kulakova finished third in the 5 km event, but was disqualified due to a positive test for banned substance ephedrine. She claimed that this was a result of using the nasal spray that contained the substance. Both the International Ski Federation and the International Olympic Committee allowed her to compete in the 10 km and the 4 × 5 km relay.

== Cross-country skiing results ==
All results are sourced from the International Ski Federation (FIS).

=== Olympic Games ===
- 8 medals – (4 gold, 2 silver, 2 bronze)

Year	Age	5 km	10 km	3/4 × 5 km relay
1968	25	Silver	6	Bronze
1972	29	Gold	Gold	Gold
1976	33	DSQ	Bronze	Gold
1980	37	6	5	Silver

=== World Championships ===
- 10 medals – (5 gold, 3 silver, 2 bronze)

Year	Age	5 km	10 km	20 km	3/4 × 5 km relay
1970	27	Gold	Bronze	—N/a	Gold
1974	31	Gold	Gold	—N/a	Gold
1978	35	4	4	Silver	Bronze
1980	37	—N/a	—N/a	Silver	—N/a
1982	39	13	10	5	Silver

=== World Cup ===
==== Season standings ====
Season	Age	Overall
1982	39	22

==== Team podiums ====
- 1 podium

No	Season	Date	Location	Race	Level	Place	Teammates
1	1981–82	24 February 1982	Oslo, Norway	4 × 5 km Relay	World Championships^{[1]}	2nd	Lyadova / Zabolotskaya / Smetanina

Note: ^{1} Until the 1999 World Championships, World Championship races were included in the World Cup scoring system.

== See also ==
- List of multiple Olympic gold medalists
- List of multiple Winter Olympic medalists
