= Helmut Unger =

German cross-country skier (born 1943)

Personal information
- Nationality: German
- Born: 2 June 1943 (age 81); Falkenstein im Vogtland, Germany

Sport
- Sport: Cross-country skiing

Helmut Unger (born 2 June 1943) is a German cross-country skier. He competed in the men's 30 kilometre event at the 1968 Winter Olympics.
