= Cross-country skiing at the 1972 Winter Olympics – Women's 10 kilometre =

Olympic skiing event

Women's 10km at the X Olympic Winter Games
- Cross-country skiing
- Venue: Cross Country Skiing Stadium
- Date: 6 February 1972
- Competitors: 42 from 12 nations
- Winning time: 34:17.82

Medalists
1st place, gold medalist(s)		Galina Kulakova; Soviet Union
2nd place, silver medalist(s)		Alevtina Olyunina; Soviet Union
3rd place, bronze medalist(s)		Marjatta Kajosmaa; Finland

The Women's 10 kilometre cross-country skiing event was part of the cross-country skiing programme at the 1972 Winter Olympics, in Sapporo, Japan. It was the sixth appearance of the event. The competition was held on 6 February 1972, at the Cross Country Skiing Stadium.

== Results ==
Rank	Name	Country	Time
1	Galina Kulakova	Soviet Union	34:17.82
2	Alevtina Olyunina	Soviet Union	34:54.11
3	Marjatta Kajosmaa	Finland	34:56.45
4	Lyubov Mukhachova	Soviet Union	34:58.56
5	Helena Takalo	Finland	35:06.34
6	Aslaug Dahl	Norway	35:18.84
7	Helena Šikolová	Czechoslovakia	35:29.33
8	Hilkka Riihivuori-Kuntola	Finland	35:36.71
9	Renate Fischer-Köhler	East Germany	35:46.96
10	Nina Shebalina	Soviet Union	35:54.59
11	Weronika Budny	Poland	35:57.59
12	Inger Aufles	Norway	36:07.08
13	Barbro Tano	Sweden	36:29.34
14	Berit Mørdre-Lammedal	Norway	36:29.43
15	Anna Gębala-Duraj	Poland	36:32.65
16	Martha Rockwell	United States	36:34.22
17	Michaela Endler	West Germany	36:38.05
18	Gabi Haupt	East Germany	36:38.41
19	Meeri Bodelid	Sweden	36:41.52
20	Anni Unger	East Germany	36:45.24
21	Józefa Chromik	Poland	36:45.39
22	Marjatta Muttilainen-Olkkonen	Finland	36:46.40
23	Eva Olsson	Sweden	36:46.50
24	Sharon Firth	Canada	36:52.49
25	Hiroko Takahashi	Japan	36:53.84
26	Milena Chlumová	Czechoslovakia	36:59.87
27	Alena Bartošová	Czechoslovakia	37:01.73
28	Birgitta Lindqvist	Sweden	37:24.76
29	Katharina Mo-Berge	Norway	37:33.16
30	Milena Cillerová	Czechoslovakia	37:40.70
31	Christine Phillip	East Germany	37:51.76
32	Ingrid Rothfuß	West Germany	38:03.69
33	Tokiko Ozeki	Japan	38:07.24
34	Władysława Majerczyk	Poland	38:19.66
35	Alison Owen-Spencer	United States	38:50.05
36	Margie Mahoney	United States	39:27.95
37	Harumi Imai	Japan	39:33.13
38	Hideko Saito	Japan	39:51.61
39	Frances Lütken	Great Britain	40:02.73
40	Hellen Sander	Canada	40:25.11
41	Trina Hosmer	United States	40:40.56
42	Monika Mrklas	West Germany	DNF
