= Bjørn Wirkola =

Norwegian ski jumper (born 1943)

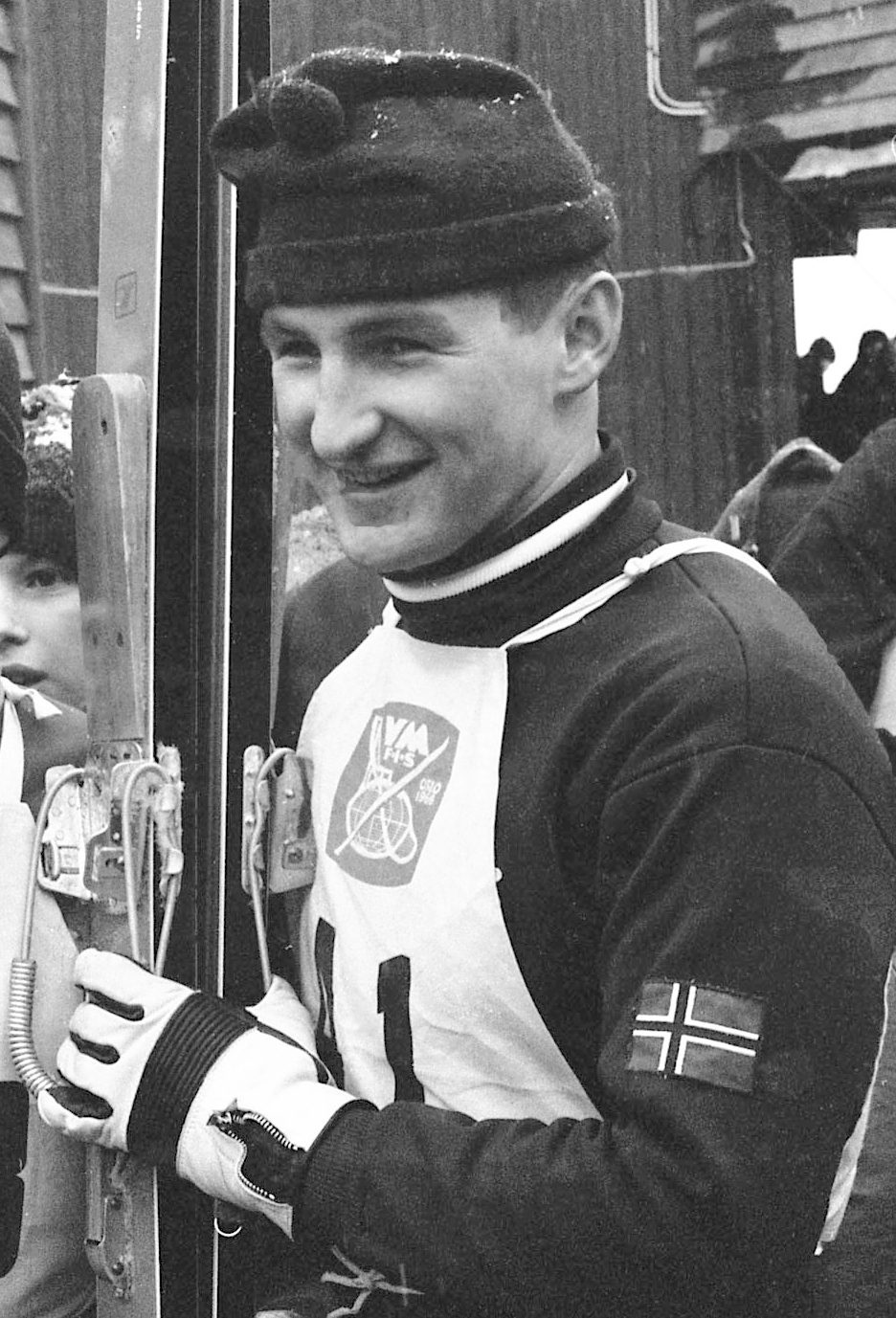
- Wirkola at the 1966 World Championships

Personal information
- Nationality: Norway
- Born: 4 August 1943 (age 82) Alta, Norway
- Height: 177 cm (5 ft 10 in)

Sport
- Sport: Skiing
- Club: Alta IF

Achievements and titles
- Personal bests: 160 m (520 ft); Planica, Yugoslavia (22 March 1969)
Medal record
World Championships
Gold medal – first place	1966 Oslo	Individual NH
Gold medal – first place	1966 Oslo	Individual LH

Bjørn Tore Wirkola (born 4 August 1943) is a Norwegian former ski jumper.

== Career ==
He became World Champion in Oslo in 1966, winning both the large and normal hill competitions. The 1966 FIS Nordic World Ski Championships were also held in conjunction with the Holmenkollen ski festival, making Wirkola the Holmenkollen champion as well (a feat he would repeat the following year). Wirkola won the Four Hills Tournament from 1967 to 1969, and is still the only ski jumper who has won this tournament three consecutive years. He also competed at three Winter Olympics: in 1964 he finished eleventh in the Nordic combined, in 1968 Winter Olympics in Grenoble, he achieved his best finish with a fourth place in the individual normal hill, 0.6 points behind the bronze medalist Baldur Preiml of Austria, and the 1972 Winter Olympics, where he finished 37th in the wind-ravaged event in the Okurayama large hill.

On 12 March 1966, on official training, he set his first world record at 145.5 metres (477 ft) and another one on the next day at 146 metres (479 ft), both on Vikersundbakken in Vikersund, Norway.

On 21 March 1969, he set his third world record at 156 metres (512 ft) and the next day his last world record at 160 metres (525 ft), both at the opening of Velikanka bratov Gorišek K153 in Planica, Yugoslavia.

For his achievements as a ski jumper, Wirkola was awarded the Holmenkollen medal in 1968 (shared with King Olav V, Assar Rönnlund, and Gjermund Eggen). The common parlance expression jumping after Wirkola has come to refer to situations where one embarks on a task where one's predecessor has done a particularly good job – or where one is unlikely to succeed.

Besides ski jumping Wirkola played association football for Rosenborg BK in the Norwegian Premier League from 1971 to 1974, and won both league and cup championships in 1971. The same year he was awarded Egebergs Ærespris; recipients of that prize had to be international competitors in one sport and top-level national competitors in a different sport.

Wirkola is of Kven descent.

== Ski jumping world records ==
Date	Hill	Location	Metres	Feet
19 March 1965	Kulm	Tauplitz/Bad Mitterndorf, Austria	144	472
12 March 1966	Vikersundbakken	Vikersund, Norway	145.5	477
13 March 1966	Vikersundbakken	Vikersund, Norway	146	479
21 March 1969	Velikanka bratov Gorišek K153	Planica, Yugoslavia	156	512
22 March 1969	Velikanka bratov Gorišek K153	Planica, Yugoslavia	160	525

Not recognized! Crash at world record distance.

Preceded by Frithjof Prydz	Egebergs Ærespris; 1971	Succeeded by Ivar Formo
