= Berit Mørdre =

Norwegian cross-country skier

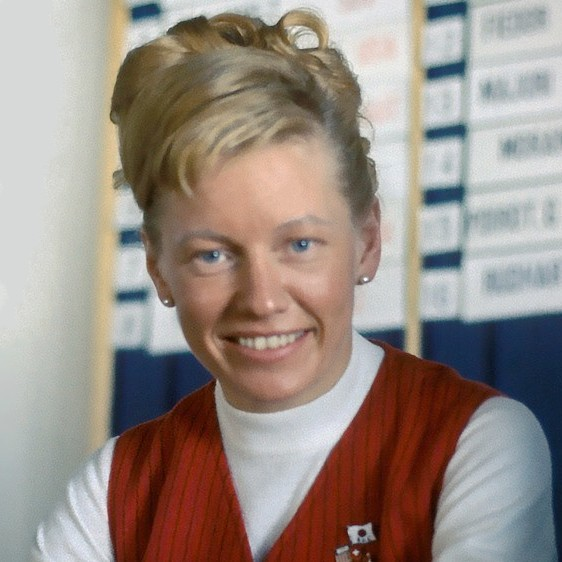

Personal information
- Born: 16 April 1940 Nes, Akershus, Norway
- Died: 23 August 2016 (aged 76)
- Height: 168 cm (5 ft 6 in)
- Weight: 57 kg (126 lb)

Sport
- Sport: Cross-country skiing
- Club: Romerikslagets IL, Oslo
Medal record
Women's cross-country skiing
Representing Norway
Olympic Games
| Gold medal – first place | 1968 Grenoble | 3 × 5 km relay |
| Silver medal – second place | 1968 Grenoble | 10 km |
| Bronze medal – third place | 1972 Sapporo | 3 × 5 km relay |
World Championships
| Silver medal – second place | 1966 Oslo | 3 × 5 km relay |

Berit Mørdre-Lammedal (née Mørdre, 16 April 1940 – 23 August 2016) was a Norwegian cross-country skier. She competed at the 1968 and 1972 Olympics in the 5 km, 10 km and 3 × 5 km relay events and won a complete set of medals: a gold, a silver and a bronze. She also won a silver medal in the relay at the 1966 World Championships.

Mørdre was born and raised on a farm in Nes, but since 1965 lived in Oslo, where she worked as a police officer. In 1969 she married, and changed her last name to Mørdre-Lammedal. She took part in several Holmenkollen ski festivals, winning the 5 km race in 1974. In 1971 she became the first Norwegian woman to win the Holmenkollen medal (shared with Marjatta Kajosmaa and Reidar Hjermstad). Domestically she won 13 Norwegian titles, six over 5 km and seven over 10 km.

== Cross-country skiing results ==
All results are sourced from the International Ski Federation (FIS).

=== Olympic Games ===
- 3 medals – (1 gold, 1 silver, 1 bronze)

| Year | Age | 5 km | 10 km | 3 × 5 km relay |
|---|---|---|---|---|
| 1968 | 27 | 10 | Silver | Gold |
| 1972 | 31 | 7 | 14 | Bronze |

=== World Championships ===
- 1 medal – (1 silver)

| Year | Age | 5 km | 10 km | 3/4 × 5 km relay |
|---|---|---|---|---|
| 1966 | 25 | 10 | 11 | Silver |
| 1970 | 29 | 9 | 24 | 4 |
| 1974 | 33 | 11 | 6 | 6 |
