= Cross-country skiing at the 1972 Winter Olympics – Women's 5 kilometre =

Olympic skiing event

Women's 5km at the XI Olympic Winter Games
- Cross-country skiing
- Venue: Cross Country Skiing Stadium
- Date: 9 February 1972
- Competitors: 43 from 12 nations
- Winning time: 17:00.50

Medalists
1st place, gold medalist(s)		Galina Kulakova	Soviet Union
2nd place, silver medalist(s)		Marjatta Kajosmaa	Finland
3rd place, bronze medalist(s)		Helena Šikolová	Czechoslovakia

The Women's 5 kilometre cross-country skiing event was part of the cross-country skiing programme at the 1972 Winter Olympics, in Sapporo, Japan. It was the third appearance of the event. The competition was held on 9 February 1972, at the Makomanai Cross Country Events Site.

== Results ==
Rank	Name	Country	Time
1	Galina Kulakova	Soviet Union	17:00.50
2	Marjatta Kajosmaa	Finland	17:05.50
3	Helena Šikolová	Czechoslovakia	17:07.32
4	Alevtina Olyunina	Soviet Union	17:07.40
5	Hilkka Kuntola	Finland	17:11.67
6	Lyubov Mukhachova	Soviet Union	17:12.08
7	Berit Mørdre-Lammedal	Norway	17:16.79
8	Aslaug Dahl	Norway	17:17.49
9	Helena Kivioja-Takalo	Finland	17:21.39
10	Nina Fyodorova-Baldycheva	Soviet Union	17:25.62
11	Michaela Endler	West Germany	17:32.56
12	Inger Aufles	Norway	17:33.14
13	Weronika Budny	Poland	17:38.74
14	Renate Fischer-Köhler	East Germany	17:41.07
15	Eva Olsson	Sweden	17:46.66
16	Alena Bartošová	Czechoslovakia	17:47.25
17	Katharina Mo-Berge	Norway	17:49.06
18	Martha Rockwell	United States	17:50.34
19	Barbro Tano	Sweden	17:54.53
20	Gabi Haupt	East Germany	17:55.04
21	Józefa Chromik	Poland	17:55.41
22	Milena Cillerová	Czechoslovakia	17:56.22
23	Władysława Majerczyk	Poland	17:56.55
24	Monika Mrklas	West Germany	17:57.40
25	Senja Pusula	Finland	17:59.93
26	Sharon Firth	Canada	18:06.28
27	Milena Chlumová	Czechoslovakia	18:12.22
28	Anni Unger	East Germany	18:13.19
29	Anna Gębala-Duraj	Poland	18:13.43
30	Christine Phillip	East Germany	18:17.02
31	Barbara Britch	United States	18:18.37
32	Birgitta Lindqvist	Sweden	18:25.88
33	Meeri Bodelid	Sweden	18:29.07
34	Hiroko Takahashi	Japan	18:32.75
35	Shirley Firth	Canada	18:36.07
36	Alison Owen-Spencer	United States	18:54.76
37	Tokiko Ozeki	Japan	19:00.82
38	Harumi Imai	Japan	19:05.73
39	Margie Mahoney	United States	19:15.13
40	Roseanne Allen	Canada	19:22.70
41	Hellen Sander	Canada	19:30.01
42	Frances Lütken	Great Britain	19:40.17
43	Akiko Akasaka	Japan	19:49.74
