= Fujiko Kato =

Japanese cross-country skier (born 1946)

Personal information
- Nationality: Japanese
- Born: 3 March 1946 (age 79); Hokkaido, Japan

Sport
- Sport: Cross-country skiing

Fujiko Kato (加藤 富士子, Katō Fujiko, born 3 March 1946) is a Japanese cross-country skier. She competed in two events at the 1968 Winter Olympics.
