= Bjarne Strand =

Norwegian alpine skier (born 1946)

Personal information
- Born: 8 November 1946 (age 78); Oppdal Municipality, Norway

Sport
- Country: Norway
- Sport: Alpine skiing
- Event(s): downhill, slalom and giant slalom
- Club: Oppdal IL

Bjarne Anders Strand (born 8 November 1946) is a Norwegian alpine skier. He was born in Oppdal Municipality. He participated at the 1968 Winter Olympics in Grenoble, where he competed in downhill, slalom and giant slalom.

He became Norwegian champion in downhill in 1966, and in slalom in 1968.
