= Aate Olkkonen =

Finnish politician

Aate Olkkonen (18 June 1877 – 29 April 1949) was a Finnish politician, born in Haapajärvi. He was a Member of the Parliament of Finland from 1907 to 1908, representing the Finnish Party.
