= Toini Gustafsson =

Swedish cross-country skier

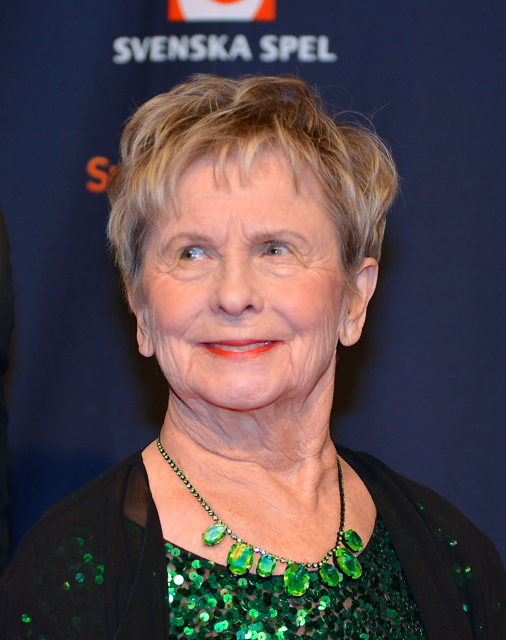
- Toini Gustafsson Rönnlund in 2014

Personal information
- Full name: Toini Lempi Gustafsson Rönnlund
- Nationality: Sweden
- Born: 17 January 1938 (age 88) Suomussalmi, Kainuu, Finland
- Height: 162 cm (5 ft 4 in)

Sport
- Sport: Skiing
- Club: IFK Likenäs; Skellefteå SK
Medal record
Women's cross-country skiing
Representing Sweden
Event	1st	2nd	3rd
Olympic Games	2	2	0
World Championships	0	1	2
Total	2	3	2
Olympic Games
Gold medal – first place	1968 Grenoble	5 km
Gold medal – first place	1968 Grenoble	10 km
Silver medal – second place	1964 Innsbruck	3 × 5 km relay
Silver medal – second place	1968 Grenoble	3 × 5 km relay
World Championships
Silver medal – second place	1962 Zakopane	3 × 5 km relay
Bronze medal – third place	1966 Oslo	10 km
Bronze medal – third place	1966 Oslo	3 × 5 km relay

Toini Gustafsson Rönnlund (born Toini Karvonen; 17 January 1938) is a Swedish former cross-country skier. She competed in the 1964 and 1968 Winter Olympics and won four medals. Gustafsson also won the 10 km race at the Holmenkollen ski festival in each of 1960, 1967, and 1968. At the FIS Nordic World Ski Championships she collected three medals with a silver in 1962 (3 × 5 km relay) and two bronzes in 1966 (10 km and 3 × 5 km relay).

For her successes in Nordic skiing and at the Holmenkollen, Gustafsson received the Holmenkollen medal in 1967 (Shared with Ole Ellefsæter). She is the first Swedish woman to win the Holmenkollen medal. In 1968, she was awarded the Svenska Dagbladet Gold Medal.

She was married twice and had a daughter, Eva, born in 1956. In 1968 she divorced her first husband and married Swedish former cross-country skier Assar Rönnlund, with whom she had two more children. They became the second husband-wife team to win the Holmenkollen medal (Rönnlund earned the medal in 1968). Additionally, they are the only husband-wife team to win the Svenska Dagbladet Gold Medal.

Gustafsson is an ethnic Finn. She was born in Suomussalmi, Finland, but was evacuated to Sweden as a Finnish war child in 1944. She retired from competition in 1968 and later worked as a physical education teacher.

She is the paternal grandmother of cross-country skier Elina Rönnlund.

== Cross-country skiing results ==
All results are sourced from the International Ski Federation (FIS).

=== Olympic Games ===
- 4 medals – (2 gold, 2 silver)

Year	Age	5 km	10 km	3 × 5 km relay
1964	26	6	8	Silver
1968	30	Gold	Gold	Silver

=== World Championships ===
- 3 medals – (1 silver, 2 bronze)

Year	Age	5 km	10 km	3 × 5 km relay
1962	24	7	8	Silver
1966	28	6	Bronze	Bronze

Preceded by Erik Petterson, Gösta Petterson, Sture Petterson, & Tomas Petterson	Svenska Dagbladet Gold Medal; 1968	Succeeded by Ove Kindvall
