= Franco Nones =

Italian cross-country skier

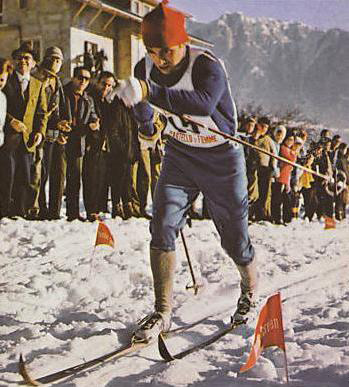

Personal information
- Full name: Francesco Nones
- Born: 1 February 1941 (age 85) Castello-Molina di Fiemme, Italy

Sport
- Sport: Cross-country skiing
- Club: Fiamme Gialle
Medal record
Men's cross-country skiing
Representing Italy
Olympic Games
Gold medal – first place	1968 Grenoble	30 km
World Championships
Bronze medal – third place	1966 Oslo	4 x 10 km

Francesco "Franco" Nones (born 1 February 1941) is an Italian former cross-country skier who competed during the 1960s.

== Biography ==
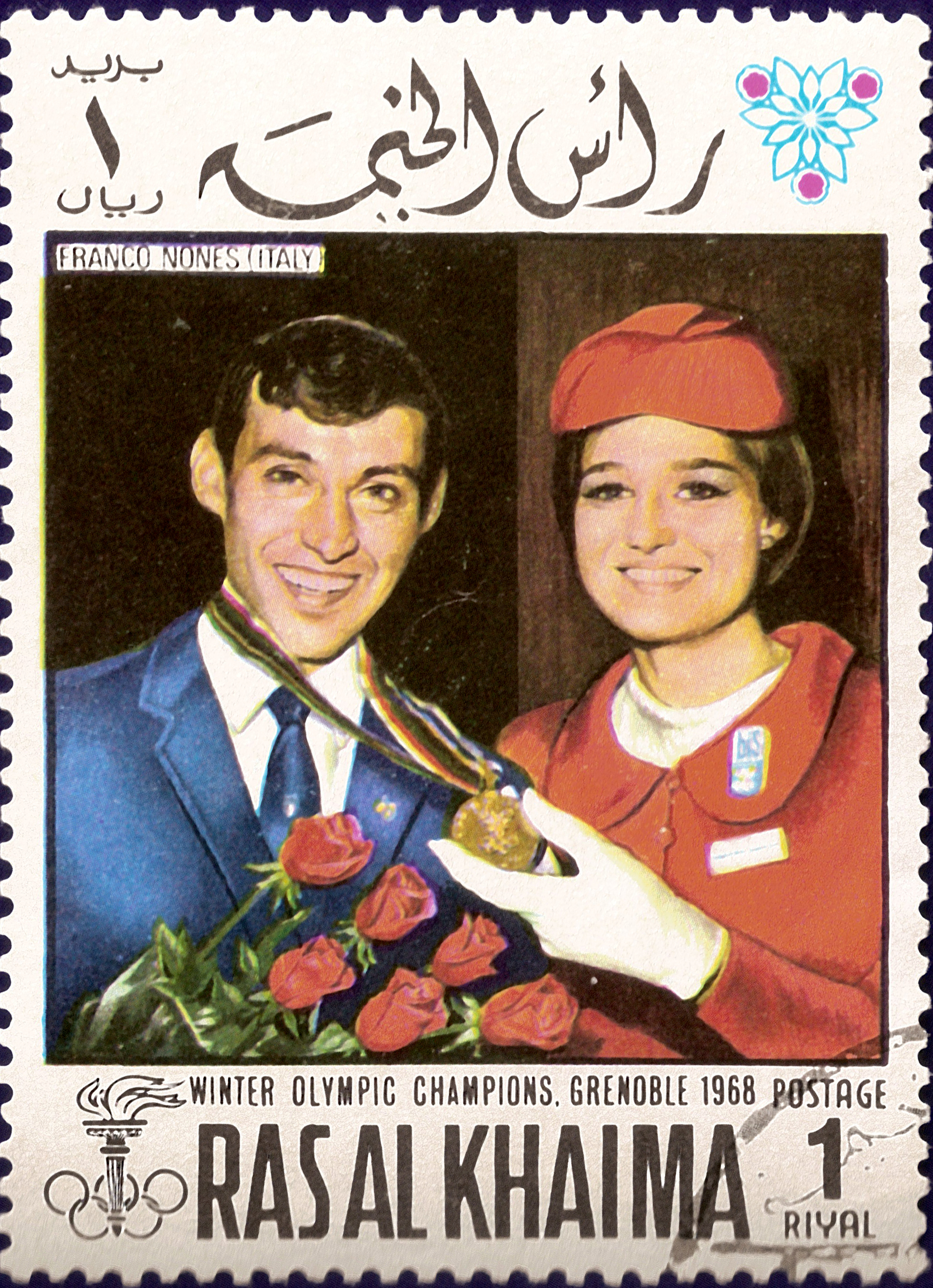
A stamp of Franco Nones.

Nones was born in Castello-Molina di Fiemme. His best known finish was a gold medal in the 30 km event at the 1968 Winter Olympics in Grenoble, making Nones the first non-Scandinavian (Finland, Norway, and Sweden) and non-Soviet/Russian male to win a Winter Olympic cross-country skiing medal of any color.

Nones also earned a bronze in the 4 x 10 km relay at the 1966 FIS Nordic World Ski Championships. He also finished 6th in the 30 km event at those same games. He participated in the 2026 Winter Olympics opening ceremony.

== Achievements ==
- 1963: 3rd, Italian men's championships of cross-country skiing, 15 km
- 1964:
  - 1st, Italian men's championships of cross-country skiing, 30 km
  - 1st, Italian men's championships of cross-country skiing, 15 km
- 1965:
  - 1st, Italian men's championships of cross-country skiing, 30 km
  - 1st, Italian men's championships of cross-country skiing, 15 km
- 1966:
  - 1st, Italian men's championships of cross-country skiing, 30 km
  - 1st, Italian men's championships of cross-country skiing, 15 km
- 1967:
  - 1st, Italian men's championships of cross-country skiing, 50 km
  - 2nd, Italian men's championships of cross-country skiing, 30 km
- 1970:
  - 1st, Italian men's championships of cross-country skiing, 30 km
  - 1st, Italian men's championships of cross-country skiing, 15 km
- 1971: 1st, Italian men's championships of cross-country skiing, 15 km

== Awards ==
On 7 May 2015, in the presence of the President of Italian National Olympic Committee (CONI), Giovanni Malagò, was inaugurated in the Olympic Park of the Foro Italico in Rome, along Viale delle Olimpiadi, the Walk of Fame of Italian sport, consisting of 100 tiles that chronologically report names of the most representative athletes in the history of Italian sport. On each tile are the name of the sportsman, the sport in which he distinguished himself and the symbol of CONI. One of these tiles is dedicated to Franco Nones.

== See also ==
- Legends of Italian sport - Walk of Fame
