= Inger Aufles =

Norwegian cross-country skier

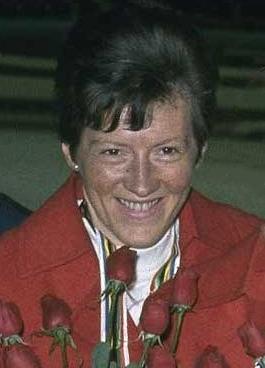
- Aufles at the 1968 Olympics

Personal information
- Born: 29 May 1941 (age 85) Valldal, Reichskommissariat Norwegen (today Norway)
- Height: 165 cm (5 ft 5 in)
- Weight: 54 kg (119 lb)

Sport
- Sport: Cross-country skiing
- Club: Kjærstad IL
Medal record
Women's cross-country skiing
Representing Norway
Olympic Games
Gold medal – first place	1968 Grenoble	3 × 5 km relay
Bronze medal – third place	1968 Grenoble	10 km
Bronze medal – third place	1972 Sapporo	3 × 5 km relay
World Championships
Silver medal – second place	1966 Oslo	3 × 5 km relay

Inger Aufles (née Døving on 29 May 1941) is a retired Norwegian cross-country skier who competed during the 1960s and 1970s. She won three Winter Olympic medals with a gold (3 × 5 km relay: 1968) and two bronzes (10 km: 1968, 3 × 5 km relay: 1972). Aufles also earned a silver in the 3 × 5 km relay at the 1966 FIS Nordic World Ski Championships in Oslo. She won the national championships in 1968 and 1969, in the 10 km and 5 km respectively.

She was born in Valldal, and in 1961 moved to Mosjøen, where she married, changed her last name from Døving to Aufles, and started training in a cross-country skiing club. She became a member of the national team in 1966 and retired after the 1972 season.

== Cross-country skiing results ==
All results are sourced from the International Ski Federation (FIS).

=== Olympic Games ===
- 3 medals – (1 gold, 2 bronze)

Year	Age	5 km	10 km	3 × 5 km relay
1968	26	7	Bronze	Gold
1972	30	12	12	Bronze

=== World Championships ===
- 1 medal – (1 silver)

Year	Age	5 km	10 km	3 × 5 km relay
1966	24	13	19	Silver
1970	28	10	—	4
