= Reidar Hjermstad =

Norwegian biathlete and cross-country skier

Reidar Hjermstad (born 10 October 1937) is a former Norwegian cross-country skier and biathlete who competed in the 1960s and 1970s.

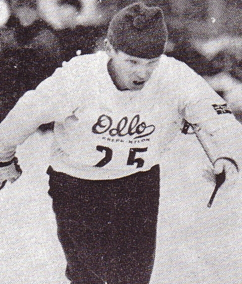

In 1963, Hjermstad won two events at the Lahti, Finland ski games, earning a Salpausselkä Medal. For his Lahti successes, Hjermstad earned the Norwegian Sportsperson of the Year (Norwegian: Årets Idrettsnavn) in 1963.

Hjermstad represented Norway in the winter olympics 3 times: Grenoble, France in 1964, Innsbruck, Austria in 1968) and Sapporo, Japan 1972.
His best Olympic result was 4th place in the 50 km at the 1972 Winter Olympics in Sapporo, Japan.

In 1971 he was awarded Norwegian skiing's highest award for competitors: The Holmenkollen Medal

Reidar Hjermstad won a total of 5 National Gold medals (NM gull) in cross-country skiing:
1963 Lørenskog in the 15 km.
1964 Furnes in the 50 km (here he was also awarded the Kongepokalen by Olav V, the King of Norway)
1968 Fossum in the 15 km
1967 Skorovatn in the 3 x 10 km relay for Hernes IL
1969 Alvdal in the 50 km

Hjermstad also won the National Gold medal title in Biathlon in Sørkedalen, Oslo 1960.

He was also a very good track & field runner. He won bronze medal in the Norwegian Championship, 10 000 m in 1962 . The time was 30.22,6. He represented the track & field club IK Tjalve from 1963-1968. His personal records are: 14.15,8 (5 000 m in 1964), and 30.02,0 (10 000 m while representing Norway against Denmark at Bislett stadium in 1962.

== Cross-country skiing results ==
All results are sourced from the International Ski Federation (FIS).

=== Olympic Games ===
Year	Age	15 km	30 km	50 km	4 × 10 km relay
1968	30	17	—	8	—
1972	34	—	—	4	—

=== World Championships ===
Year	Age	15 km	30 km	50 km	4 × 10 km relay
1962	24	—	16	—	—

Preceded by Toralf Engan	Norwegian Sportsperson of the Year; 1963	Succeeded by Terje Pedersen
