= Babben Enger-Damon =

Norwegian cross-country skier

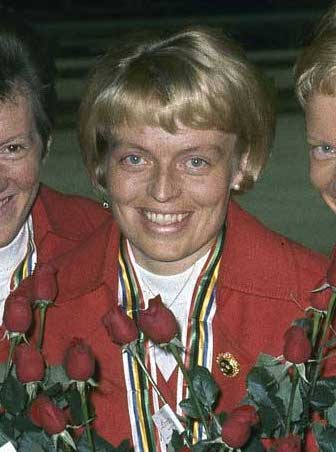
- Enger-Damon at the 1968 Olympics

Personal information
- Born: 19 September 1939 (age 86) Oslo, Norway

Sport
- Sport: Cross-country skiing
- Club: Romerikslagets IL, Oslo
Medal record
Women's cross-country skiing
Representing Norway
Olympic Games
Gold medal – first place	1968 Grenoble	3 × 5 km relay

Barbra Mette Stockfleth "Babben" Enger-Damon (née Enger on 19 September 1939) is a retired Norwegian cross-country skier who competed at the 1964 and 1968 Olympics. She won a gold medal in the 3 × 5 km relay and finished eighth in the 10 km in 1968. Domestically she won the 10 km Norwegian title in 1963 and 1964.

Enger is the daughter of Norwegian painter Erling Enger. Between the 1964 and 1968 she married American cross-country skier Larry Damon; they first lived in Norway, but later moved to Vermont in the United States. Besides skiing she competed in the national championships in sailing and orienteering, a won one a gold medal in sailing and a silver and bronze medals in orienteering.

== Cross-country skiing results ==
=== Olympic Games ===
- 1 medal – (1 gold)

Year	Age	5 km	10 km	3 × 5 km relay
1964	24	31	18	—
1968	28	21	8	Gold
