= Velichka Pandeva =

Bulgarian cross-country skier (born 1942)

Personal information
- Nationality: Bulgarian
- Born: 10 January 1942 (age 83)

Sport
- Sport: Cross-country skiing

Velichka Pandeva (Bulgarian: Величка Пандева, born 10 January 1942) is a Bulgarian cross-country skier. She competed in three events at the 1968 Winter Olympics.
