= Tsvetana Sotirova =

Bulgarian cross-country skier (born 1939)

Personal information
- Nationality: Bulgarian
- Born: 22 December 1939 (age 85); Gotse Delchev, Bulgaria

Sport
- Sport: Cross-country skiing

Tsvetana Sotirova (Bulgarian: Цветана Сотирова, born 22 December 1939) is a Bulgarian former cross-country skier. She competed in three events at the 1968 Winter Olympics.
