= Roza Dimova =

Bulgarian cross-country skier (born 1936)

Personal information
- Nationality: Bulgarian
- Born: 18 April 1936 (age 88); Kyustendil, Bulgaria

Sport
- Sport: Cross-country skiing

Roza Dimova (Bulgarian: Роза Димова, born 18 April 1936) is a Bulgarian former cross-country skier. She competed at the 1960, 1964 and the 1968 Winter Olympics.
