= Nadezhda Vasileva =

Bulgarian cross-country skier (born 1937)

Personal information
- Nationality: Bulgarian
- Born: 25 June 1937 (age 87); Sofia, Bulgaria

Sport
- Sport: Cross-country skiing

Nadezhda Vasileva (Bulgarian: Надежда Василева) (born 25 June 1937) is a Bulgarian cross-country skier. She competed at the 1960, 1964 and the 1968 Winter Olympics.
