= Cross-country skiing at the 1972 Winter Olympics – Women's 3 × 5 kilometre relay =

Women's 3 × 5 kilometre relay at the XI Olympic Winter Games
- Cross-country skiing
- Venue: Cross Country Skiing Stadium
- Date: 12 February 1972
- Competitors: 33 from 11 nations
- Winning time: 48:16.15

Medalists
1st place, gold medalist(s)		Lyubov Mukhachyova; Alevtina Olyunina; Galina Kulakova	Soviet Union
2nd place, silver medalist(s)		Helena Takalo; Hilkka Riihivuori; Marjatta Kajosmaa	Finland
3rd place, bronze medalist(s)		Inger Aufles; Aslaug Dahl; Berit Mørdre	Norway

The Women's 3 × 5 kilometre relay cross-country skiing event was part of the cross-country skiing programme at the 1972 Winter Olympics, in Sapporo, Japan. It was the fifth appearance of the event. The competition was held on 12 February 1972, at the Makomanai Cross Country Events Site.

== Results ==
Rank	Name	Country	Time
1	Lyubov Mukhachyova; Alevtina Olyunina; Galina Kulakova	Soviet Union	48:16.15
2	Helena Takalo; Hiikka Kuntola; Marjatta Kajosmaa	Finland	49:19.37
3	Inger Aufles; Aslaug Dahl; Berit Mørdre	Norway	49:51.49
4	Monika Mrklas; Ingrid Rothfuß; Michaela Endler	West Germany	50:25.61
5	Gabi Haupt; Renate Fischer-Köhler; Anni Unger	East Germany	50:28.45
6	Alena Bartošová; Helena Šikolová; Milena Cillerová	Czechoslovakia	51:16.16
7	Anna Gębala-Duraj; Józefa Chromik; Weronika Budny	Poland	51:49.13
8	Meeri Bodelid; Eva Olsson; Birgitta Lindqvist	Sweden	51:51.84
9	Tokiko Ozeki; Hiroko Takahashi; Hideko Saito	Japan	53:20.75
10	Shirley Firth; Sharon Firth; Roseanne Allen	Canada	53:37.82
11	Barbara Britch; Alison Owen-Spencer; Martha Rockwell	United States	53:38.60
