= FIS Nordic World Ski Championships 1966 =

International Nordic skiing competition

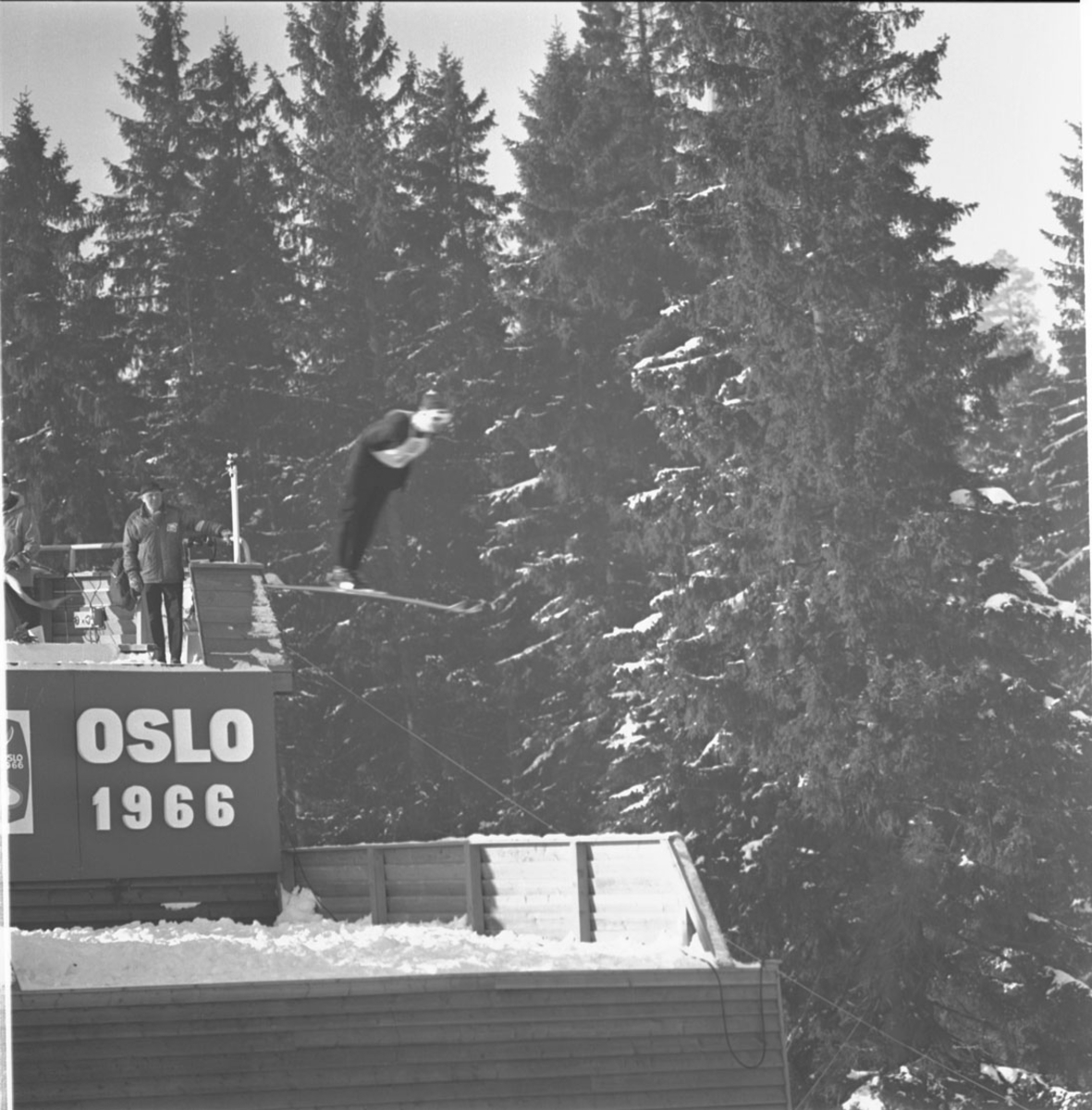
- Ski jumping during the FIS Nordic World Ski Championships 1966
- Host city: Oslo
- Country: Norway
- Events: 10
- Opening: 17 February 1966
- Closing: 27 February 1966

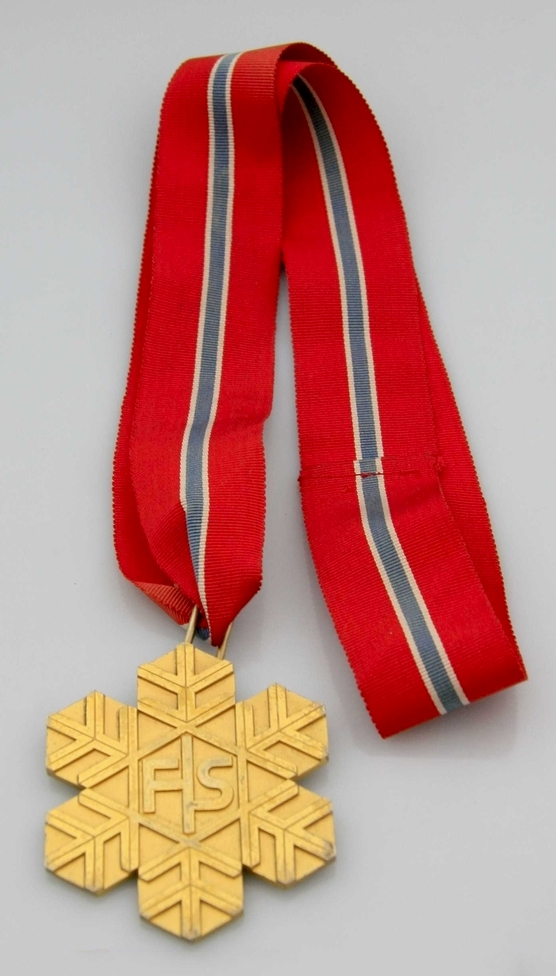
Gold medal from the FIS Nordic World Ski Championships 1966

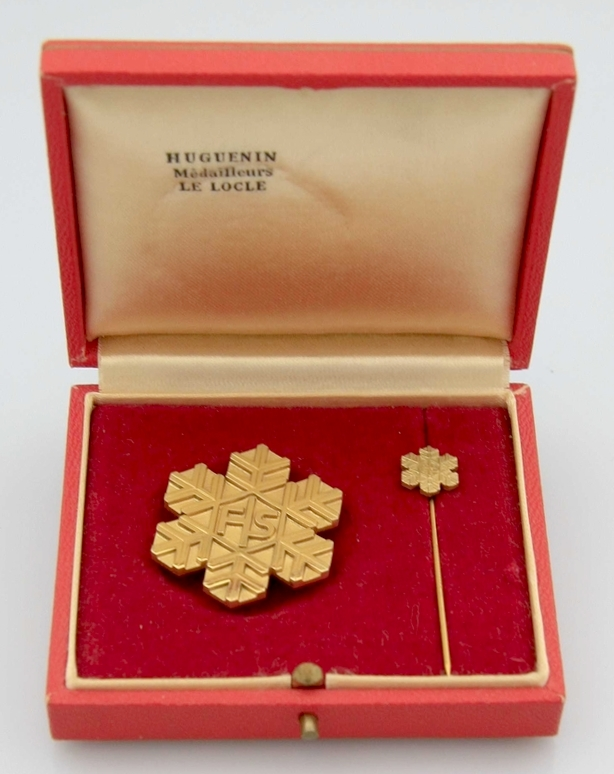
Gold medal pin. The box mentions the manufacturer, Huguenin médailleurs, Le Locle.

The FIS Nordic World Ski Championships 1966 took place 17–27 February 1966 in Oslo, Norway at the Holmenkollen ski arena. This was the third time the Norwegian capital hosted this event having done so in 1930 and at the 1952 Winter Olympics. This also equaled the most times a city had hosted with Lahti, Finland (1926, 1938, 1958) and Zakopane, Poland (1929, 1939, and 1962).

== Men's cross-country ==
=== 15 km ===
20 February 1966

Medal	Athlete	Time
Gold	Gjermund Eggen (NOR)	47:56.2
Silver	Ole Ellefsæter (NOR)	48:11.3
Bronze	Odd Martinsen (NOR)	48:14.7

=== 30 km ===
17 February 1966

Medal	Athlete	Time
Gold	Eero Mäntyranta (FIN)	1:37:26.7
Silver	Kalevi Laurila (FIN)	1:38:11.3
Bronze	Walter Demel (FRG)	1:38:11.6

=== 50 km ===
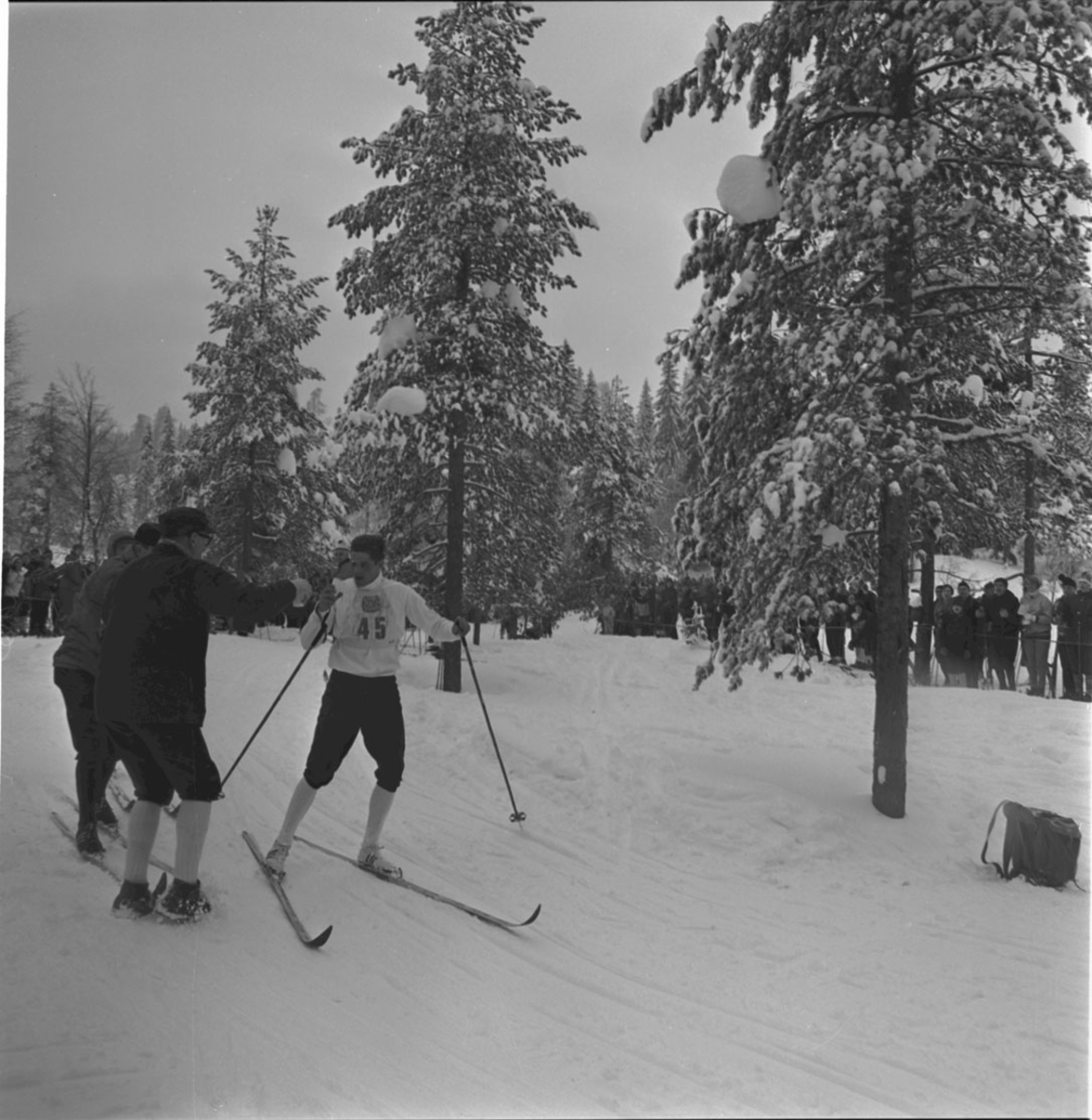
Gjermund Eggen during the championships

26 February 1966

Medal	Athlete	Time
Gold	Gjermund Eggen (NOR)	3:03:04.7
Silver	Arto Tiainen (FIN)	3:03:15.1
Bronze	Eero Mäntyranta (FIN)	3:03:54.3

=== 4 × 10 km relay ===
23 February 1966

Medal	Team	Time
Gold	Norway (Odd Martinsen, Harald Grønningen, Ole Ellefsæter, Gjermund Eggen)	2:14:27.9
Silver	Finland (Kalevi Oikarainen, Hannu Taipale, Kalevi Laurila, Eero Mäntyranta)	2:15:40.9
Bronze	Italy (Giulio de Florian, Franco Nones, Gianfranco Stella, Franco Manfroi)	2:18:12.2

== Women's cross-country ==
=== 5 km ===
21 February 1966

Medal	Athlete	Time
Gold	Alevtina Kolchina (URS)	17:18.9
Silver	Klavdiya Boyarskikh (URS)	17:25.2
Bronze	Rita Achkina (URS)	17:42.5

=== 10 km ===
19 February 1966

Medal	Athlete	Time
Gold	Klavdiya Boyarskikh (URS)	36:25.5
Silver	Alevtina Kolchina (URS)	36:43.3
Bronze	Toini Gustafsson (SWE)	37:21.4

=== 3 × 5 km relay ===
27 February 1966

Medal	Team	Time
Gold	Soviet Union (Klavdiya Boyarskikh, Rita Achkina, Alevtina Kolchina)	56:04.2
Silver	Norway (Ingrid Wigernæs, Inger Aufles, Berit Mørdre)	57:59.8
Bronze	Sweden (Barbro Martinsson, Britt Strandberg, Toini Gustafsson)	58:00.7

== Men's Nordic combined ==
=== Individual ===
21 February 1966

Medal	Athlete	Points
Gold	Georg Thoma (FRG)	444.66
Silver	Franz Keller (FRG)	443.04
Bronze	Alois Kälin (SUI)	440.73

== Men's ski jumping ==
=== Individual normal hill ===
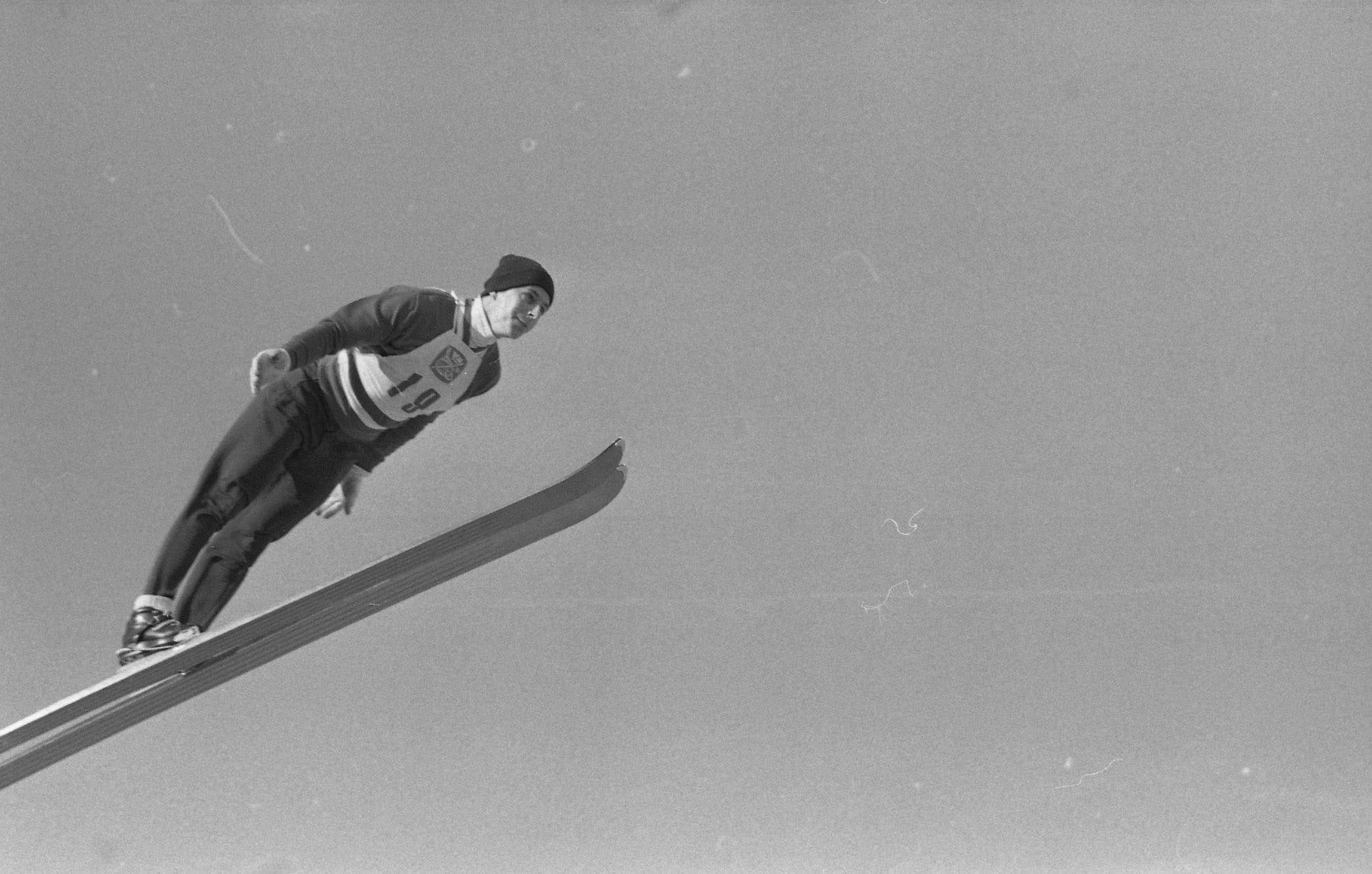
Paavo Lukkariniemi at the individual normal hill competition

19 February 1966

Medal	Athlete	Points
Gold	Bjørn Wirkola (NOR)	234.6
Silver	Dieter Neuendorf (GDR)	230.6
Bronze	Paavo Lukkariniemi (FIN)	219.9

=== Individual large hill ===
27 February 1966

Medal	Athlete	Points
Gold	Bjørn Wirkola (NOR)	215.3
Silver	Takashi Fujisawa (JPN)	207.6
Bronze	Kjell Sjöberg (SWE)	204.6

== Medal table ==
Rank	Nation	Gold	Silver	Bronze	Total
1	Norway (NOR)	5	2	1	8
2	Soviet Union (URS)	3	2	1	6
3	Finland (FIN)	1	3	2	6
4	West Germany (FRG)	1	1	1	3
5	East Germany (GDR)	0	1	0	1
5	Japan (JPN)	0	1	0	1
7	Sweden (SWE)	0	0	3	3
8	Italy (ITA)	0	0	1	1
8	Switzerland (SUI)	0	0	1	1
Totals (9 entries)		10	10	10	30
