= Cross-country skiing at the 1968 Winter Olympics =

Cross-country skiing at the X Olympic Winter Games
- Venue: Autrans
- Dates: February 7–17
- No. of events: 7
- Competitors: 147 (110 men, 37 women) from 25 nations

The 1968 Winter Olympic Games cross-country skiing results.

== Medal summary ==
=== Medal table ===
Rank	Nation	Gold	Silver	Bronze	Total
1	Norway	4	2	1	7
2	Sweden	2	2	1	5
3	Italy	1	0	0	1
4	Soviet Union	0	2	2	4
5	Finland	0	1	2	3
6	Switzerland	0	0	1	1
Totals (6 entries)		7	7	7	21

=== Men's events ===
Event	Gold		Silver		Bronze	
15 km	Harald Grønningen; Norway	47:54.2	Eero Mäntyranta; Finland	47:56.1	Gunnar Larsson; Sweden	48:33.7
30 km	Franco Nones; Italy	1:35:39.2	Odd Martinsen; Norway	1:36:28.9	Eero Mäntyranta; Finland	1:36:55.3
50 km	Ole Ellefsæter; Norway	2:28:45.8	Vyacheslav Vedenin; Soviet Union	2:29:05.5	Josef Haas; Switzerland	2:29:14.8
4 × 10 km relay	Norway; Odd Martinsen; Pål Tyldum; Harald Grønningen; Ole Ellefsæter	2:08:33.5	Sweden; Jan Halvarsson; Bjarne Andersson; Gunnar Larsson; Assar Rönnlund	2:10:13.2	Finland; Kalevi Oikarainen; Hannu Taipale; Kalevi Laurila; Eero Mäntyranta	2:10:56.7

=== Women's events ===
Event	Gold		Silver		Bronze	
5 km	Toini Gustafsson; Sweden	16:45.2	Galina Kulakova; Soviet Union	16:48.4	Alevtina Kolchina; Soviet Union	16:51.6
10 km	Toini Gustafsson; Sweden	36:45.5	Berit Mørdre; Norway	37:54.6	Inger Aufles; Norway	37:59.9
3 × 5 km relay	Norway; Inger Aufles; Babben Enger; Berit Mørdre Lammedal	57:30.0	Sweden; Barbro Martinsson; Toini Gustafsson; Britt Strandberg	57:51.0	Soviet Union; Alevtina Kolchina; Rita Achkina; Galina Kulakova	58:13.6
