= List of 1964 Winter Olympics medal winners =

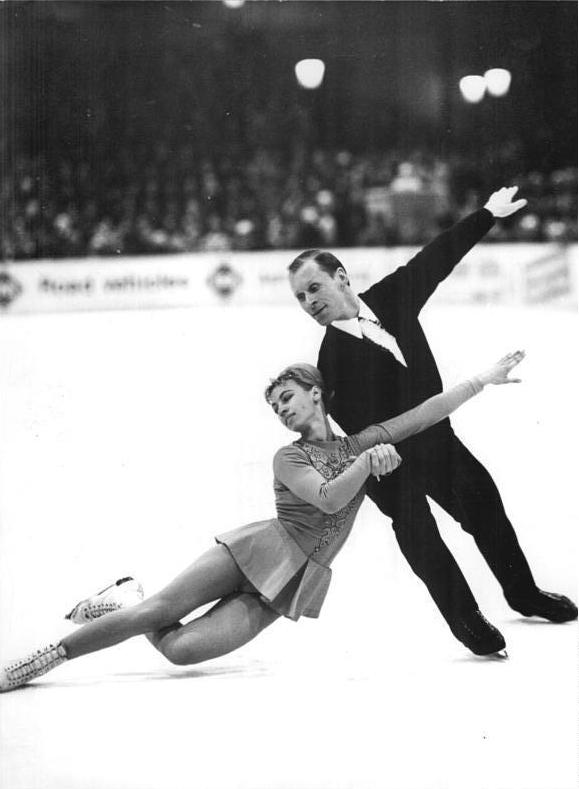
Oleg Protopopov and Ludmila Belousova of the Soviet Union won the gold medal in the pairs' figure skating event in Innsbruck.

The 1964 Winter Olympics, officially known by the International Olympic Committee as the IX Olympic Winter Games, were a multi-sport event held in Innsbruck, Austria, from 29 January through 9 February 1964. A total of 1,095 athletes representing 36 National Olympic Committees (NOCs) participated in the Games in 34 events across 10 disciplines.

The Olympic program was adjusted from that of the 1960 Squaw Valley Olympics with the return of bobsleigh and addition of a new sport, luge. Additionally, a demonstration sport, ice stock sport, was incorporated into the 1964 Olympic program. This was the second and most recent occasion on which this sport (a German variant of curling), had been played as a demonstration sport at the Winter Olympics; the first appearance was at the 1936 Winter Olympics. Both men and women participated in the 1964 Games, with twelve women's events incorporated into the program.

The Soviet Union won the most medals; its athletes collected a total of 25, 11 of which were gold. Norway placed second, with 15 medals, and host nation Austria placed third, with 12 medals. Of the 36 competing NOCs, 14 won at least one medal, with 11 of these winning at least one gold. The 1964 Games were marred by the deaths of two competitors during training – the British luge competitor Kazimierz Kay-Skrzypeski and the Australian alpine skier Ross Milne.

The Scandinavian nations Sweden, Norway and Finland, as well as the Soviet Union, repeated their dominance of the 1960 cross-country skiing medal tally in 1964 – together, they won all of the medals attainable for this sport. Similarly, Germany had great success at the luge competition, with the United Team of Germany winning five of the available nine medals. Two participants representing Great Britain placed first in the two-man bobsleigh event, earning that nation its first Winter Olympics gold medal in 12 years. Lidiya Skoblikova, a Russian speed skater representing the Soviet Union, earned the most medals at the 1964 Games, winning gold in all four of the women's events in her sport. This achievement made Skoblikova the first Winter Olympian to win four individual gold medals in one edition of the Games.

== Alpine skiing ==
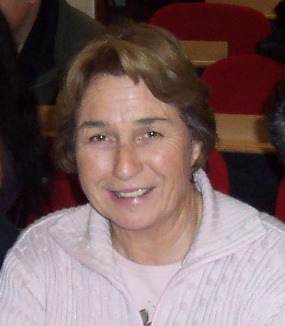
Marielle Goitschel won two medals in alpine skiing at Innsbruck.

Event	Gold	Silver	Bronze
Men's downhill	Egon Zimmermann; Austria	Léo Lacroix; France	Wolfgang Bartels; United Team of Germany
Men's slalom	Josef Stiegler; Austria	Billy Kidd; United States	James Heuga; United States
Men's giant slalom	François Bonlieu; France	Karl Schranz; Austria	Josef Stiegler; Austria
Women's downhill	Christl Haas; Austria	Edith Zimmermann; Austria	Traudl Hecher; Austria
Women's slalom	Christine Goitschel; France	Marielle Goitschel; France	Jean Saubert; United States
Women's giant slalom	Marielle Goitschel; France	Christine Goitschel; France	None awarded
Women's giant slalom	Marielle Goitschel; France	Jean Saubert; United States	None awarded

== Biathlon ==
Event	Gold	Silver	Bronze
Men's 20 km	Vladimir Melanin; Soviet Union	Aleksandr Privalov; Soviet Union	Olav Jordet; Norway

== Bobsleigh ==
Event	Gold	Silver	Bronze
Men's two-man	Great Britain; Anthony Nash; Robin Dixon	Italy; Sergio Zardini; Romano Bonagura	Italy; Eugenio Monti; Sergio Siorpaes
Men's four-man	Canada; Vic Emery; Peter Kirby; Douglas Anakin; John Emery	Austria; Erwin Thaler; Adolf Koxeder; Josef Nairz; Reinhold Durnthaler	Italy; Eugenio Monti; Sergio Siorpaes; Benito Rigoni; Gildo Siorpaes

== Cross-country skiing ==
Event	Gold	Silver	Bronze
Men's 15 km	Eero Mäntyranta; Finland	Harald Grønningen; Norway	Sixten Jernberg; Sweden
Men's 30 km	Eero Mäntyranta; Finland	Harald Grønningen; Norway	Igor Voronchikhin; Soviet Union
Men's 50 km	Sixten Jernberg; Sweden	Assar Rönnlund; Sweden	Arto Tiainen; Finland
Men's 4 x 10 km relay	Sweden; Karl-Åke Asph; Sixten Jernberg; Janne Stefansson; Assar Rönnlund	Finland; Väinö Huhtala; Arto Tiainen; Kalevi Laurila; Eero Mäntyranta	Soviet Union; Ivan Utrobin; Gennady Vaganov; Igor Voronchikhin; Pavel Kolchin
Women's 5 km	Klavdiya Boyarskikh; Soviet Union	Mirja Lehtonen; Finland	Alevtina Kolchina; Soviet Union
Women's 10 km	Klavdiya Boyarskikh; Soviet Union	Yevdokiya Mekshilo; Soviet Union	Maria Gusakova; Soviet Union
Women's 3 x 5 km relay	Soviet Union; Alevtina Kolchina; Yevdokiya Mekshilo; Klavdiya Boyarskikh	Sweden; Barbro Martinsson; Britt Strandberg; Toini Gustafsson	Finland; Senja Pusula; Toini Pöysti; Mirja Lehtonen

== Figure skating ==
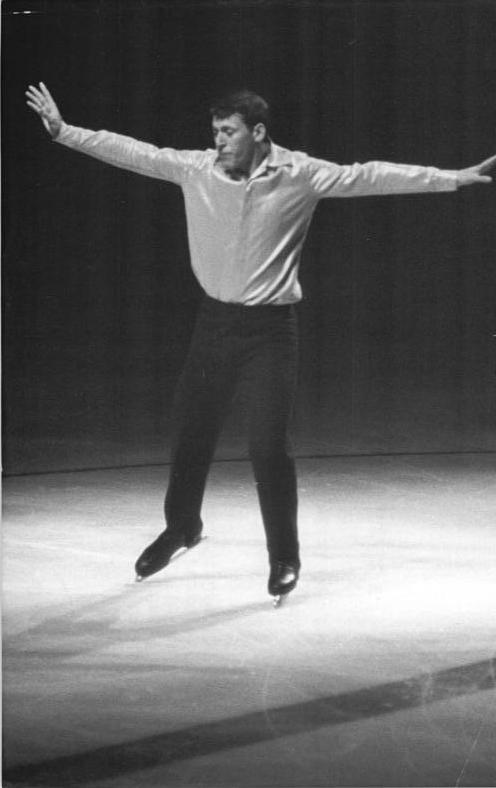
French figure skating silver medallist Alain Calmat in 1963

Event	Gold	Silver	Bronze
Men's singles	Manfred Schnelldorfer; United Team of Germany	Alain Calmat; France	Scott Allen; United States
Ladies' singles	Sjoukje Dijkstra; Netherlands	Regine Heitzer; Austria	Petra Burka; Canada
Pairs	Soviet Union; Ludmila Belousova; Oleg Protopopov	United Team of Germany; Marika Kilius; Hans-Jürgen Bäumler Canada; Debbi Wilkes; Guy Revell	United States; Vivian Joseph; Ronald Joseph

== Ice hockey ==
Event	Gold	Silver	Bronze
Men's team	Soviet Union; Veniamin Alexandrov; Aleksandr Almetov; Vitaly Davydov; Anatoli Firsov; Eduard Ivanov; Viktor Konovalenko; Victor Kuzkin; Konstantin Loktev; Boris Mayorov; Yevgeni Mayorov; Stanislav Petukhov; Alexander Ragulin; Vyacheslav Starshinov; Leonid Volkov; Victor Yakushev; Boris Zaitzev; Oleg Zaytsev	Sweden; Anders Andersson; Gert Blomé; Lennart Häggroth; Lennart Johansson; Nils Johansson; Sven "Tumba" Johansson; Lars-Eric Lundvall; Eilert Määttä; Hans Mild; Nisse Nilsson; Bert-Ola Nordlander; Carl-Göran Öberg; Uno Öhrlund; Ronald Pettersson; Ulf Sterner; Roland Stoltz; Kjell Svensson	Czechoslovakia; Vlastimil Bubník; Josef Černý; Jiří Dolana; Vladimír Dzurilla; Jozef Golonka; František Gregor; Jiří Holik; Jaroslav Jiřík; Jan Klapáč; Vladimír Nadrchal; Rudolf Potsch; Stanislav Prýl; Ladislav Šmíd; Stanislav Sventek; František Tikal; Miroslav Vlach; Jaroslav Walter

== Luge ==
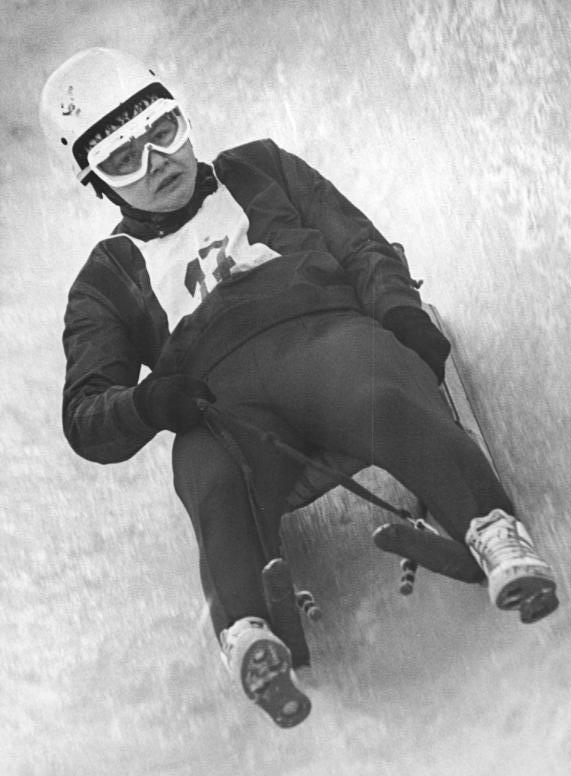
East German gold medallist Ortrun Enderlein in 1964

Event	Gold	Silver	Bronze
Men's singles	Thomas Köhler; United Team of Germany	Klaus Bonsack; United Team of Germany	Hans Plenk; United Team of Germany
Women's singles	Ortrun Enderlein; United Team of Germany	Ilse Geisler; United Team of Germany	Helene Thurner; Austria
Men's doubles	Austria; Josef Feistmantl; Manfred Stengl	Austria; Reinhold Senn; Helmut Thaler	Italy; Walter Ausserdorfer; Sigisfredo Mair

== Nordic combined ==
Event	Gold	Silver	Bronze
Men's	Tormod Knutsen; Norway	Nikolay Kiselyov; Soviet Union	Georg Thoma; United Team of Germany

== Ski jumping ==
Event	Gold	Silver	Bronze
Men's normal hill	Veikko Kankkonen; Finland	Toralf Engan; Norway	Torgeir Brandtzæg; Norway
Men's large hill	Toralf Engan; Norway	Veikko Kankkonen; Finland	Torgeir Brandtzæg; Norway

== Speed skating ==
Event	Gold	Silver	Bronze
Men's 500 metres	Terry McDermott; United States	Alv Gjestvang; Norway Yevgeny Grishin; Soviet Union Vladimir Orlov; Soviet Union	None awarded^{[a]}
Men's 1500 metres	Ants Antson; Soviet Union	Kees Verkerk; Netherlands	Villy Haugen; Norway
Men's 5000 metres	Knut Johannesen; Norway	Per Ivar Moe; Norway	Fred Anton Maier; Norway
Men's 10000 metres	Jonny Nilsson; Sweden	Fred Anton Maier; Norway	Knut Johannesen; Norway
Women's 500 metres	Lidiya Skoblikova; Soviet Union	Irina Yegorova; Soviet Union	Tatyana Sidorova; Soviet Union
Women's 1000 metres	Lidiya Skoblikova; Soviet Union	Irina Yegorova; Soviet Union	Kaija Mustonen; Finland
Women's 1500 metres	Lidiya Skoblikova; Soviet Union	Kaija Mustonen; Finland	Berta Kolokoltseva; Soviet Union
Women's 3000 metres	Lidiya Skoblikova; Soviet Union	Han Pil-Hwa; North Korea Valentina Stenina; Soviet Union	None awarded^{[b]}

== Multiple medalists ==
Athletes who won multiple medals during the 1964 Winter Olympics are listed below.

Athlete	Nation	Sport	Gold	Silver	Bronze	Total
Lidiya Skoblikova	Soviet Union	Speed skating	4	0	0	4
Klavdiya Boyarskikh	Soviet Union	Cross-country skiing	3	0	0	3
Eero Mäntyranta	Finland	Cross-country skiing	2	1	0	3
Sixten Jernberg	Sweden	Cross-country skiing	2	0	1	3
Christine Goitschel	France	Alpine skiing	1	1	0	2
Marielle Goitschel	France	Alpine skiing	1	1	0	2
Yevdokiya Mekshilo	Soviet Union	Cross-country skiing	1	1	0	2
Toralf Engan	Norway	Ski jumping	1	1	0	2
Veikko Kankkonen	Finland	Ski jumping	1	1	0	2
Assar Rönnlund	Sweden	Cross-country skiing	1	1	0	2
Alevtina Kolchina	Soviet Union	Cross-country skiing	1	0	1	2
Knut Johannesen	Norway	Speed skating	1	0	1	2
Josef Stiegler	Austria	Alpine skiing	1	0	1	2
Irina Yegorova	Soviet Union	Speed skating	0	2	0	2
Harald Grønningen	Norway	Cross-country skiing	0	2	0	2
Mirja Lehtonen	Finland	Cross-country skiing	0	1	1	2
Kaija Mustonen	Finland	Speed skating	0	1	1	2
Jean Saubert	United States	Alpine skiing	0	1	1	2
Fred Anton Maier	Norway	Speed skating	0	1	1	2
Arto Tiainen	Finland	Cross-country skiing	0	1	1	2
Torgeir Brandtzæg	Norway	Ski jumping	0	0	2	2
Eugenio Monti	Italy	Bobsleigh	0	0	2	2
Sergio Siorpaes	Italy	Bobsleigh	0	0	2	2
Igor Voronchikhin	Soviet Union	Cross-country skiing	0	0	2	2

== Notes ==
- ^{a} No bronze medal was awarded in this event because three competitors tied for second place with a time of 40.6 seconds.
- ^{b} No bronze medal was awarded in this event because Skoblikova and Han tied for second with a time of 5 minutes 18.5 seconds.

== See also ==
- 1964 Winter Olympics medal table
