= Soviet Union at the 1964 Winter Olympics =

- Flag of the Soviet Union
- IOC code: URS
- NOC: Soviet Olympic Committee

in Innsbruck
- Competitors: 69 (52 men, 17 women) in 8 sports
- Flag bearer: Yevgeny Grishin (speed skating)
- Medals Ranked 1st: Gold 11 Silver 8 Bronze 6 Total 25

Winter Olympics appearances (overview)
- 1956; 1960; 1964; 1968; 1972; 1976; 1980; 1984; 1988

Other related appearances
- Latvia (1924–1936, 1992–); Estonia (1928–1936, 1992–); Lithuania (1928, 1992–); Unified Team (1992); Armenia (1994–); Belarus (1994–); Georgia (1994–); Kazakhstan (1994–); Kyrgyzstan (1994–); Moldova (1994–); Russia (1994–2014); Ukraine (1994–); Uzbekistan (1994–); Azerbaijan (1998–); Tajikistan (2002–); Olympic Athletes from Russia (2018); ROC (2022); Individual Neutral Athletes (2026)

The Soviet Union (USSR) competed at the 1964 Winter Olympics in Innsbruck, Austria.

== Medalists ==
Medal	Name	Sport	Event
Gold	Vladimir Melanin	Biathlon	Men's 20 km
Gold	Klavdiya Boyarskikh	Cross-country skiing	Women's 5 km
Gold	Klavdiya Boyarskikh	Cross-country skiing	Women's 10 km
Gold	Alevtina Kolchina; Yevdokiya Mekshilo; Klavdiya Boyarskikh	Cross-country skiing	Women's 3 x 5 km relay
Gold	Liudmila Belousova; Oleg Protopopov	Figure skating	Pairs
Gold	Soviet Union men's national ice hockey team: Viktor Konovalenko; Boris Zaytsev; Vitaly Davydov; Eduard Ivanov; Aleksandr Ragulin; Viktor Kuzkin; Konstantin Loktev; Aleksandr Almetov; Veniamin Aleksandrov; Yevgeny Mayorov; Vyacheslav Starshinov; Boris Mayorov; Leonid Volkov; Viktor Yakushev; Anatoly Firsov; Oleg Zaytsev; Stanislav Petukhov	Ice hockey	Men's competition
Gold	Ants Antson	Speed skating	Men's 1500 m
Gold	Lidiya Skoblikova	Speed skating	Women's 500 m
Gold	Lidiya Skoblikova	Speed skating	Women's 1000 m
Gold	Lidiya Skoblikova	Speed skating	Women's 1500 m
Gold	Lidiya Skoblikova	Speed skating	Women's 3000 m
Silver	Aleksandr Privalov	Biathlon	Men's 20 km
Silver	Yevdokiya Mekshilo	Cross-country skiing	Women's 10 km
Silver	Nikolay Kiselyov	Nordic combined	Men's individual
Silver	Vladimir Orlov	Speed skating	Men's 500 m (tie)
Silver	Yevgeny Grishin	Speed skating	Men's 500 m (tie)
Silver	Irina Yegorova	Speed skating	Women's 500 m
Silver	Irina Yegorova	Speed skating	Women's 1000 m
Silver	Valentina Stenina	Speed skating	Women's 3000 m
Bronze	Igor Voronchikhin	Cross-country skiing	Men's 30 km
Bronze	Ivan Utrobin; Gennady Vaganov; Igor Voronchikhin; Pavel Kolchin	Cross-country skiing	Men's 4 × 10 km relay
Bronze	Alevtina Kolchina	Cross-country skiing	Women's 5 km
Bronze	Mariya Gusakova	Cross-country skiing	Women's 10 km
Bronze	Tatyana Sidorova	Speed skating	Women's 500 m
Bronze	Berta Kolokoltseva	Speed skating	Women's 1500 m

== Alpine skiing ==
Men

Athlete	Event	Race	
Athlete	Event	Time	Rank
Valery Shein	Downhill	2:38.13	54
Tally Monastyryov	Downhill	2:35.27	47
Vasily Melnikov	Downhill	2:30.83	36
Vasily Melnikov	Giant slalom	DNF	–
Tally Monastyryov	Giant slalom	2:01.94	37
Valery Shein	Giant slalom	2:01.18	34
Viktor Talyanov	Giant slalom	2:00.38	31

Men's slalom

Athlete	Qualifying				Final					
Athlete	Time 1	Rank	Time 2	Rank	Time 1	Rank	Time 2	Rank	Total	Rank
Valery Shein	56.33	32	DNF	–	did not advance					
Tally Monastyryov	55.71	28	56.09	10 QF	DNS	–	–	–	DNF	–
Vasily Melnikov	53.59	9 QF	–	–	1:16.18	26	1:06.43	25	2:22.61	25

Women

Athlete	Event	Race 1		Race 2		Total	
Athlete	Event	Time	Rank	Time	Rank	Time	Rank
Stalina Demidova-Korzukhina	Downhill					2:09.28	40
Galina Sidorova	Downhill					2:08.32	39
Yevgeniya Kabina-Sidorova	Downhill					2:05.19	37
Galina Sidorova	Giant slalom					2:12.98	39
Yevgeniya Kabina-Sidorova	Giant slalom					2:11.06	38
Stalina Demidova-Korzukhina	Giant slalom					2:10.11	35
Yevgeniya Kabina-Sidorova	Slalom	52.00	25	1:07.48	28	1:59.48	27
Stalina Demidova-Korzukhina	Slalom	51.88	24	53.09	17	1:44.97	18
Galina Sidorova	Slalom	51.72	23	56.54	24	1:48.26	20

== Biathlon ==
Men

Event	Athlete	Time	Misses	Adjusted time ^{1}	Rank
20 km	Nikolay Puzanov	1'21:21.5	4	1'29:21.5	10
20 km	Valentin Pshenitsyn	1'22:59.0	2	1'26:59.0	7
20 km	Aleksandr Privalov	1'23:42.5	0	1'23:42.5	2nd place, silver medalist(s)
20 km	Vladimir Melanin	1'20:26.8	0	1'20:26.8	1st place, gold medalist(s)

== Cross-country skiing ==
Men

Event	Athlete	Race	
Event	Athlete	Time	Rank
15 km	Valery Tarakanov	52:58.2	17
15 km	Gennady Vaganov	52:46.8	14
15 km	Igor Voronchikhin	51:53.9	7
15 km	Pavel Kolchin	51:52.0	6
30 km	Gennady Vaganov	1'35:03.1	19
30 km	Ivan Utrobin	1'34:10.4	17
30 km	Bayazit Gizatullin	1'33:33.4	12
30 km	Igor Voronchikhin	1'32:15.8	3rd place, bronze medalist(s)
50 km	Ivan Lyubimov	2'52:28.1	17
50 km	Aleksandr Gubin	2'51:39.7	14
50 km	Bayazit Gizatullin	2'51:02.4	12
50 km	Igor Voronchikhin	2'49:21.7	11

Men's 4 × 10 km relay

Athletes	Race	
Athletes	Time	Rank
Ivan Utrobin; Gennady Vaganov; Igor Voronchikhin; Pavel Kolchin	2'18:46.9	3rd place, bronze medalist(s)

Women

Event	Athlete	Race	
Event	Athlete	Time	Rank
5 km	Rita Achkina	18:51.1	10
5 km	Yevdokiya Mekshilo	18:16.7	4
5 km	Alevtina Kolchina	18:08.4	3rd place, bronze medalist(s)
5 km	Klavdiya Boyarskikh	17:50.5	1st place, gold medalist(s)
10 km	Alevtina Kolchina	41:26.2	7
10 km	Mariya Gusakova	40:46.6	3rd place, bronze medalist(s)
10 km	Yevdokiya Mekshilo	40:26.6	2nd place, silver medalist(s)
10 km	Klavdiya Boyarskikh	40:24.3	1st place, gold medalist(s)

Women's 3 x 5 km relay

Athletes	Race	
Athletes	Time	Rank
Alevtina Kolchina; Yevdokiya Mekshilo; Klavdiya Boyarskikh	59:20.2	1st place, gold medalist(s)

== Figure skating ==
Men

Athlete	CF	FS	Points	Places	Rank
Valery Meshkov	DNS	–	–	–	DNS

Pairs

Athletes	Points	Places	Rank
Tatiana Zhuk; Aleksandr Gavrilov	96.6	45	5
Liudmila Belousova; Oleg Protopopov	104.4	13	1st place, gold medalist(s)

== Ice hockey ==
=== First round ===
Winners (in bold) qualified for the Group A to play for 1st–8th places. Teams, which lost their qualification matches, played in Group B for 9th–16th places.

Team 1	Score	Team 2
**Soviet Union**	19–1	Hungary

=== Medal round ===
Rank	Team	Pld	W	L	T	GF	GA	Pts
1	Soviet Union (gold)	7	7	0	0	54	10	14
2	Sweden	7	5	2	0	47	16	10
3	Czechoslovakia	7	5	2	0	38	19	10
4	Canada	7	5	2	0	32	17	10
5	United States	7	2	5	0	29	33	4
6	Finland	7	2	5	0	10	31	4
7	Germany	7	2	5	0	13	49	4
8	Switzerland	7	0	7	0	9	57	0

- USSR 5–1 USA
- USSR 7–5 Czechoslovakia
- USSR 15–0 Switzerland
- USSR 10–0 Finland
- USSR 10–0 Germany (UTG)
- USSR 4–2 Sweden
- USSR 3–2 Canada

**Roster**; Viktor Konovalenko; Boris Zaytsev; Vitaly Davydov; Eduard Ivanov; Aleksandr Ragulin; Viktor Kuzkin; Konstantin Loktev; Aleksandr Almetov; Veniamin Aleksandrov; Yevgeny Mayorov; Vyacheslav Starshinov; Boris Mayorov; Leonid Volkov; Viktor Yakushev; Anatoly Firsov; Oleg Zaytsev; Stanislav Petukhov

== Nordic combined ==
Events:

- normal hill ski jumping (three jumps, best two counted and shown here)
- 15 km cross-country skiing

Athlete	Event	Ski jumping				Cross-country			Total	
Athlete	Event	Distance 1	Distance 2	Points	Rank	Time	Points	Rank	Points	Rank
Nikolay Kiselyov	Individual	70.0	62.0	233.0	3	51:49.1	220.04	8	453.04	2nd place, silver medalist(s)
Vyacheslav Dryagin	Individual	64.5	67.0	216.2	10	52:58.3	206.55	12	422.75	7
Nikolay Gusakov	Individual	66.0	69.5	223.4	7	51:19.8	225.96	5	449.36	4

== Ski jumping ==
Athletes performed three jumps, the best two were counted and are shown here.

Athlete	Event	Jump 1		Jump 2		Total	
Athlete	Event	Distance	Points	Distance	Points	Points	Rank
Nikolay Shamov	Normal hill	71.5	96.7	70.0	95.4	192.1	36
Nikolay Kamensky	Normal hill	72.0	100.4	73.5	100.7	201.1	21
Pyotr Kovalenko	Normal hill	75.0	101.1	77.5	104.0	205.1	12
Aleksandr Ivannikov	Normal hill	75.0	101.6	73.5	101.7	203.3	17
Nikolay Kamensky	Large hill	79.5	94.3	73.0	89.9	184.2	38
Pyotr Kovalenko	Large hill	87.0	99.1	81.0	102.3	201.4	20
K'oba Ts'akadze	Large hill	87.0	99.1	80.5	96.5	195.6	27
Aleksandr Ivannikov	Large hill	90.0	106.8	83.5	106.5	213.3	6

== Speed skating ==
Men

Event	Athlete	Race	
Event	Athlete	Time	Rank
500 m	Boris Gulyayev	41.7	15
500 m	Rafael Grach	41.4	10
500 m	Vladimir Orlov	40.6	2nd place, silver medalist(s)
500 m	Yevgeny Grishin	40.6	2nd place, silver medalist(s)
1500 m	Yevgeny Grishin	2:13.3	11
1500 m	Eduard Matusevich	2:12.2	6
1500 m	Lev Zaytsev	2:12.1	5
1500 m	Ants Antson	2:10.3	1st place, gold medalist(s)
5000 m	Muzakhid Khabibulin	7:52.3	10
5000 m	Viktor Kosichkin	7:45.8	4
10000 m	Igor Ostashov	16:45.5	12
10000 m	Viktor Kosichkin	16:19.3	6
10000 m	Ants Antson	16:08.7	5

Women

Event	Athlete	Race	
Event	Athlete	Time	Rank
500 m	Tatyana Sidorova	45.5	3rd place, bronze medalist(s)
500 m	Irina Yegorova	45.4	2nd place, silver medalist(s)
500 m	Lidiya Skoblikova	45.0 OR	1st place, gold medalist(s)
1000 m	Valentina Stenina	1:36.0	5
1000 m	Irina Yegorova	1:34.3	2nd place, silver medalist(s)
1000 m	Lidiya Skoblikova	1:33.2 OR	1st place, gold medalist(s)
1500 m	Valentina Stenina	2:29.9	7
1500 m	Berta Kolokoltseva	2:27.1	3rd place, bronze medalist(s)
1500 m	Lidiya Skoblikova	2:22.6 OR	1st place, gold medalist(s)
3000 m	Klara Nesterova-Guseva	5:22.5	4
3000 m	Valentina Stenina	5:18.5	2nd place, silver medalist(s)
3000 m	Lidiya Skoblikova	5:14.9	1st place, gold medalist(s)

== Medals by republic ==
In the following table for team events number of team representatives, who received medals are counted, not "one medal for all the team", as usual. Because there were people from different republics in one team.

Rank	Nation	Gold	Silver	Bronze	Total
1	Russian SFSR	28	7	9	44
2	Estonian SSR	1	0	0	1
2	Ukrainian SSR	1	0	0	1
4	Belarusian SSR	0	1	0	1
Totals (4 entries)		30	8	9	47
