= Cross-country skiing at the 1964 Winter Olympics =

Cross-country skiing at the IX Olympic Winter Games
- Venue: Seefeld
- Dates: January 29 – February 9
- No. of events: 7
- Competitors: 151 from 24 nations

At the 1964 Winter Olympics seven cross-country skiing events – four for men and three for women – were contested. The events began on January 30, 1964, in Seefeld, Austria. The women's 5 km race debuted at this Olympics.

== Medal summary ==
=== Medal table ===
Rank	Nation	Gold	Silver	Bronze	Total
1	Soviet Union	3	1	4	8
2	Finland	2	2	2	6
3	Sweden	2	2	1	5
4	Norway	0	2	0	2
Totals (4 entries)		7	7	7	21

=== Men's events ===
Event	Gold		Silver		Bronze	
15 km	Eero Mäntyranta; Finland	50:54.1	Harald Grønningen; Norway	51:34.8	Sixten Jernberg; Sweden	51:42.2
30 km	Eero Mäntyranta; Finland	1:30:50.7	Harald Grønningen; Norway	1:32:02.3	Igor Voronchikhin; Soviet Union	1:32:15.8
50 km	Sixten Jernberg; Sweden	2:43:52.6	Assar Rönnlund; Sweden	2:44:58.2	Arto Tiainen; Finland	2:45:30.4
4 × 10 km relay	Sweden; Karl-Åke Asph; Sixten Jernberg; Janne Stefansson; Assar Rönnlund	2:18:34.6	Finland; Väinö Huhtala; Arto Tiainen; Kalevi Laurila; Eero Mäntyranta	2:18:42.4	Soviet Union; Ivan Utrobin; Gennady Vaganov; Igor Voronchikhin; Pavel Kolchin	2:18:46.9

=== Women's events ===
Event	Gold		Silver		Bronze	
5 km	Klavdiya Boyarskikh; Soviet Union	17:50.5	Mirja Lehtonen; Finland	17:52.9	Alevtina Kolchina; Soviet Union	18:08.4
10 km	Klavdiya Boyarskikh; Soviet Union	40:24.3	Yevdokiya Mekshilo; Soviet Union	40:26.6	Maria Gusakova; Soviet Union	40:46.6
3 × 5 km relay	Soviet Union; Alevtina Kolchina; Yevdokiya Mekshilo; Klavdiya Boyarskikh	59:20.2	Sweden; Barbro Martinsson; Britt Strandberg; Toini Gustafsson	1:01:27.0	Finland; Senja Pusula; Toini Pöysti; Mirja Lehtonen	1:02:45.1
