= List of Winter Olympics venues: M =

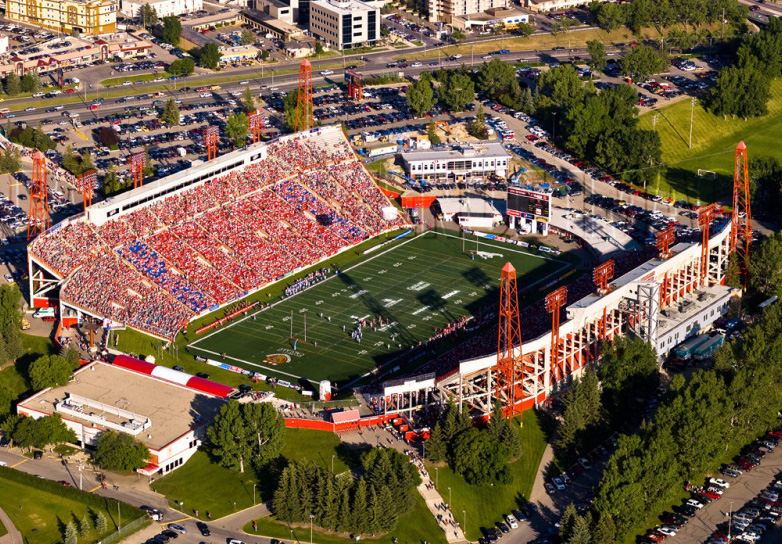
McMahon Stadium hosted the opening and closing ceremonies for the 1988 Winter Olympics in Calgary.

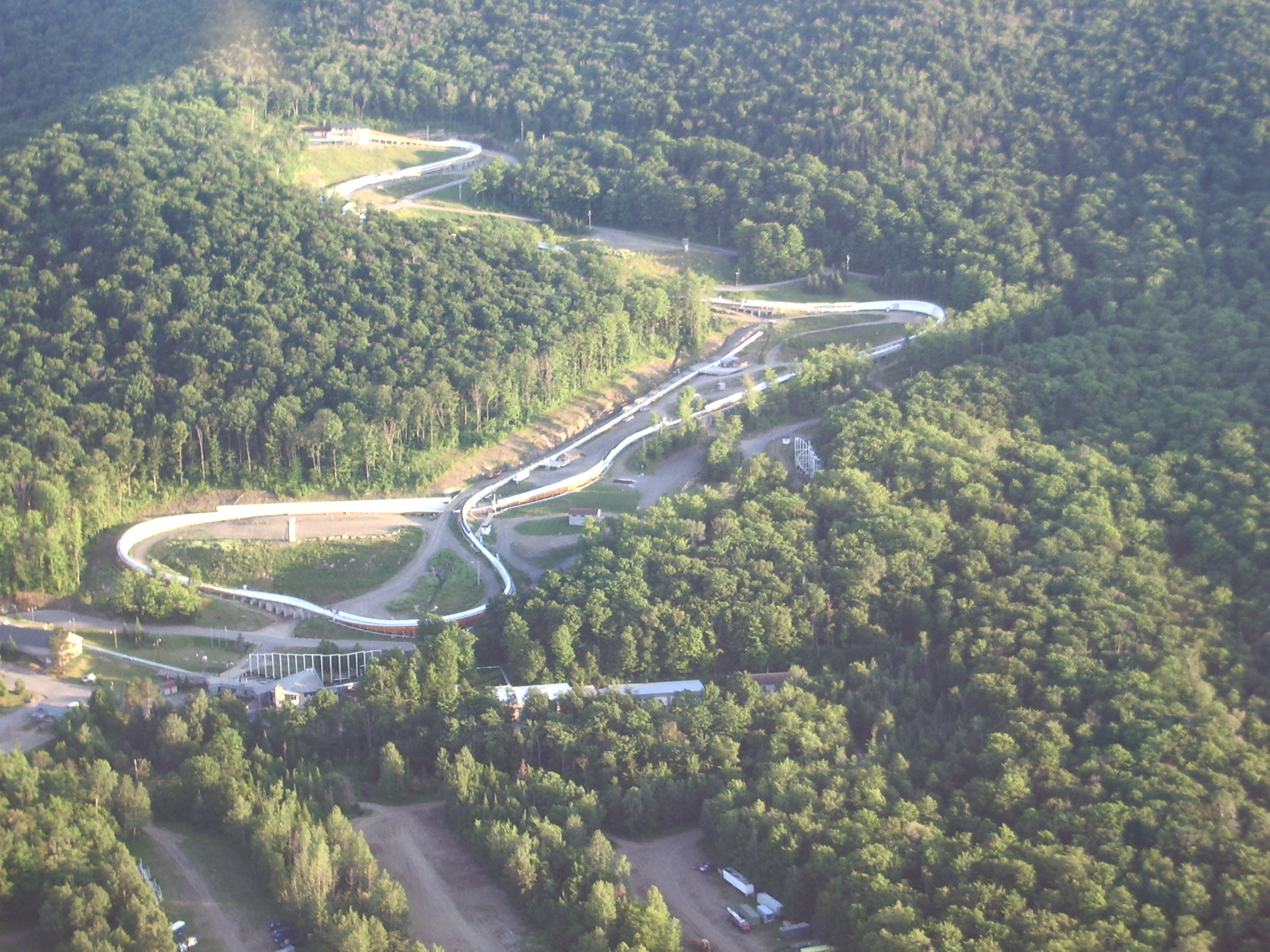
Mt. Van Hoevenberg Olympic Bobsled Run in 2005. The track (shown on the right) hosted the bobsleigh competitions for the 1932 Winter Olympics in Lake Placid. Forty-eight years later, two tracks were used with one for bobsleigh and another for luge.

For the Winter Olympics, there are 27 venues starting with the letter 'M'. This is the most among all Winter Olympic venues listed alphabetically.

Venue	Games	Sports	Capacity	Ref.
M-Wave	1998 Nagano	Speed skating	10,000	
Makomanai Biathlon site	1972 Sapporo	Biathlon	Not listed.	
Makomanai Cross-country site	1972 Sapporo	Cross-country skiing, Nordic combined (cross-country skiing)	Not listed.	
Makomanai Ice Arena	1972 Sapporo	Figure skating (final), Ice hockey (final), closing ceremonies	2,700	
Makomanai Speed Skating Rink	1972 Sapporo	Opening ceremonies, Speed skating	50,000	
Maly Ice Palace	2014 Sochi	Ice hockey	7,000	
Marienlyst stadion	1952 Oslo	Ice hockey	Not listed	
Max Bell Arena	1988 Calgary	Curling (demonstration), Short track speed skating (demonstration)	3,200	
McKinney Creek Stadium	1960 Squaw Valley	Biathlon, Cross-country skiing, Nordic combined (cross-country skiing)	1,000	
McMahon Stadium	1988 Calgary	Ceremonies (opening/closing)	38,205	
Méribel	1992 Albertville	Alpine skiing (women)	3,000	
Méribel Ice Palace	1992 Albertville	Ice hockey	6,420	
Messehalle	1964 Innsbruck	Ice hockey	5,544	
Messehalle	1976 Innsbruck	Ice hockey	Not listed.	
Mikaho Indoor Skating Rink	1972 Sapporo	Figure skating	12,000	
Minami Nagano Sports Park	1998 Nagano	Ceremonies (opening/ closing)	50,000	
Miyanomori Jumping Hill	1972 Sapporo	Nordic combined (ski jumping), Ski jumping (normal hill)	Not listed.	
Mount Eniwa Downhill Course	1972 Sapporo	Alpine skiing (downhill)	Not listed.	
Mount Faloria	1956 Cortina d'Ampezzo	Alpine skiing (giant slalom)	7,920 (men)	
Mount Higashidate	1998 Nagano	Alpine skiing (giant slalom)	20,000	
Mt. Teine Alpine Skiing courses	1972 Sapporo	Alpine skiing (slalom, giant slalom)	Not listed.	
Mt. Teine Bobsleigh Course	1972 Sapporo	Bobsleigh	Not listed.	
Mt. Teine Luge Course	1972 Sapporo	Luge	Not listed.	
Mount Tofana	1956 Cortina d'Ampezzo	Alpine skiing (downhill, slalom)	12,080 (men's slalom)	
Mt. Van Hoevenberg Bob-Run	1932 Lake Placid	Bobsleigh	12500	
Mt. Van Hoevenberg Bob and Luge Run	1980 Lake Placid	Bobsleigh, Luge (Separate tracks)	11,000 (bobsleigh)	
Mount Yakebitai	1998 Nagano	Alpine skiing (slalom), Snowboarding (giant slalom)	20,000	
