= Kolokoltsev =

Kolokoltsev (Russian: Колокольцев) is a Russian surname. The feminine form of the name is Kolokoltseva (Russian: Колокольцева). Notable people with the surname include:

- Berta Kolokoltseva (born 1937), Russian speed skater
- Oleksiy Kolokoltsev (born 1981), Ukrainian weightlifter
- Vladimir Kolokoltsev (born 1961), Russian politician and police officer
