= Galina Sidorova =

Soviet alpine skier (1945–2022)

Personal information
- Nationality: Soviet
- Born: 6 March 1945; Moscow, Soviet Union
- Died: September 2022 (aged 77)

Sport
- Sport: Alpine skiing

Galina Sidorova (6 March 1945 – September 2022) was a Soviet alpine skier. She competed at the 1964 Winter Olympics and the 1968 Winter Olympics.
