= Bayazit Gizatullin =

Russian cross-country skier

Personal information
- Nationality: Russian
- Born: 1 July 1936; Chuyunchi-Chupanovo, Zilairsky District, Bashkir ASSR, RSFSR, Soviet Union
- Died: 13 November 2011 (aged 75); Kumertau, Russia

Sport
- Sport: Cross-country skiing

Bayazit Khamatdinovich Gizatullin (Russian: Баязит Хаматдинович Гизатуллин; 1 July 1936 – 13 November 2011) was a Russian cross-country skier. He competed in the men's 30 kilometre event at the 1964 Winter Olympics.
