= Karl-Åke Asph =

Swedish cross-country skier

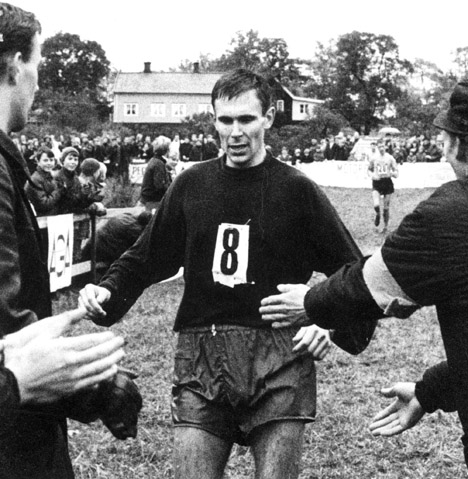
- Karl-Åke Asph wins the Lidingöloppet (1967)

Personal information
- Full name: Karl-Åke Asph
- Born: 2 February 1939 (age 87) Avesta, Sweden
- Height: 184 cm (6 ft 0 in)

Sport
- Sport: Skiing
- Club: IFK Mora SK
Medal record
Men's cross-country skiing
Representing Sweden
Olympic Games
| Gold medal – first place | 1964 Innsbruck | 4 × 10 km relay |

Karl-Åke Asph (born 2 February 1939) is a Swedish cross-country skier who competed during the 1960s. He won a gold medal in the 4 × 10 km relay at the 1964 Winter Olympics in Innsbruck. He was born in Avesta.

== Cross-country skiing results ==
=== Olympic Games ===
- 1 medal – (1 gold)

| Year | Age | 15 km | 30 km | 50 km | 4 × 10 km relay |
|---|---|---|---|---|---|
| 1964 | 28 | — | — | — | Gold |
