= Kazimierz Kay-Skrzypecki =

British luger (1905–1964)

- Born: Kazimierz Kay-Skrzypecki; 25 November 1905; Boryslav, Kingdom of Galicia and Lodomeria, Austria-Hungary
- Died: 22 January 1964 (aged 58); Innsbruck, Austria

Kazimierz Kay-Skrzypecki (or Skrzypeski) (25 November 1905 – 22 January 1964) was a British luge racer.

Skrzypecki was a former pilot in the Royal Air Force. He died from injuries sustained during one of the training runs for the first Olympic luge competition at the 1964 Winter Olympics in Innsbruck. On 21 January 1964, he suffered a fractured skull, fractured pelvis, and other injuries in the accident. He died the next day when his heart stopped during an emergency operation. Days later, on 25 January 1964, Australian downhill skier Ross Milne also died, of a head injury during a training run. The opening ceremonies of the Games were held on 29 January 1964.
