= Boris Mikhaylovich Zaytsev =

- Born: 23 March 1937 Moscow, Soviet Union
- Died: 24 February 2000 (aged 62)
- Position: Goaltender
- SCL team: HC Dynamo Moscow
Medal record
Men's Ice hockey
Gold medal – first place	1964 Innsbruck	Team competition

Boris Mikhaylovich Zaytsev (Russian: Бори́с Миха́йлович За́йцев; 23 March 1937 – 24 February 2000) was a Soviet ice hockey goaltender who competed in the 1964 Winter Olympics.

== Career ==
At 1964 Winter Olympics, Zaytsev won the gold medal as member of the Soviet Union men's national ice hockey team. Zaytsev also played for HC Dynamo Moscow in the Soviet Championship League. He was inducted into the Russian and Soviet Hockey Hall of Fame in 1964.
