= Vladimir Orlov (speed skater) =

Russian speed skater

Olympic medal record

Men's Speed Skating
Silver medal – second place	1964 Innsbruck	500 m

Vladimir Aleksandrovich Orlov (Russian: Владимир Александрович Орлов, born 2 December 1938) is a Russian speed skater who competed for the Soviet Union in the 1964 Winter Olympics.

He was born in Moscow. In 1964 he won the silver medal in the 500 metres event.
