= Yevgeni Mayorov =

Russian ice hockey player (1938–1997)

Personal information
- Born: 11 February 1938 Moscow, Russian SFSR, Soviet Union
- Died: 10 December 1997 (aged 59) Moscow, Russia
- Height: 172 cm (5 ft 8 in)
- Weight: 72 kg (159 lb)

Sport
- Sport: Ice hockey
- Club: HC Spartak Moscow; VehU Tampere (Finland)
Medal record
Representing Soviet Union
Gold medal – first place	1964 Innsbruck	Team
World Championships
Bronze medal – third place	1961 Switzerland	Team
Gold medal – first place	1963 Sweden	Team

Yevgeni Aleksandrovich Mayorov (Russian: Евгений Александрович Майоров; 11 February 1938 – 10 December 1997) was a Russian ice hockey forward who played in the Soviet Hockey League for Spartak Moscow. He won the world title in 1963 and an Olympic gold medal in 1964. In 1963, Mayorov was inducted into the Russian and Soviet Hockey Hall of Fame.

== Career ==
Mayorov started playing for Spartak in 1956, together with his twin brother Boris. They won two Soviet titles, in 1962 and 1967. In 1967, Yevgeny retired from competitions to become a coach with Spartak, but returned to play for the Finnish club Vehmaisten Urheilijat Tampere in the 1968–69 season. In 1969–1976, he managed Spartak Moscow, and since late the 1960s had also worked as a sports commentator on television. From 1982 until his death in 1997, Mayorov was a full-time hockey commentator and journalist with Gosteleradio, the Soviet state broadcasting company. In 1998, he was named the best Russian sports commentator of the year.

== International statistics ==
Year	Team	Event	GP	G	A	Pts	PIM
1961	Soviet Union	WC	7	5	1	6	6
1963	Soviet Union	WC	7	3	2	5	2
1964	Soviet Union	OLY	6	5	2	7	0
Senior totals			20	13	5	18	8
