= Viktor Kuzkin =

Russian ice hockey player (1940–2008)

Medal record

Men's ice hockey

Representing Soviet Union

Olympic Games
Gold medal – first place	1964 Innsbruck	Team
Gold medal – first place	1968 Grenoble	Team
Gold medal – first place	1972 Sapporo	Team

World Championships
Gold medal – first place	1963 Sweden	Team
Gold medal – first place	1965 Finland	Team
Gold medal – first place	1966 Yugoslavia	Team
Gold medal – first place	1967 Austria	Team
Gold medal – first place	1969 Sweden	Team
Gold medal – first place	1971 Switzerland	Team

Viktor Grigorievich Kuzkin (July 6, 1940 – June 24, 2008) was a Soviet ice hockey defender who played in the Soviet Hockey League. He played for HC CSKA Moscow. He was inducted into the Russian and Soviet Hockey Hall of Fame in 1963. He was born in Moscow, Soviet Union.

Kuzkin won three gold medals in ice hockey at the Winter Olympics, winning them from 1964 to 1972. He was inducted into the IIHF Hall of Fame in 2005.

He died after suffering a heart attack whilst diving in Sochi, Russia.
