= Messehalle, Innsbruck =

Convention center and sports venue in Austria

Coordinates: 47.2710°N 11.4028°E

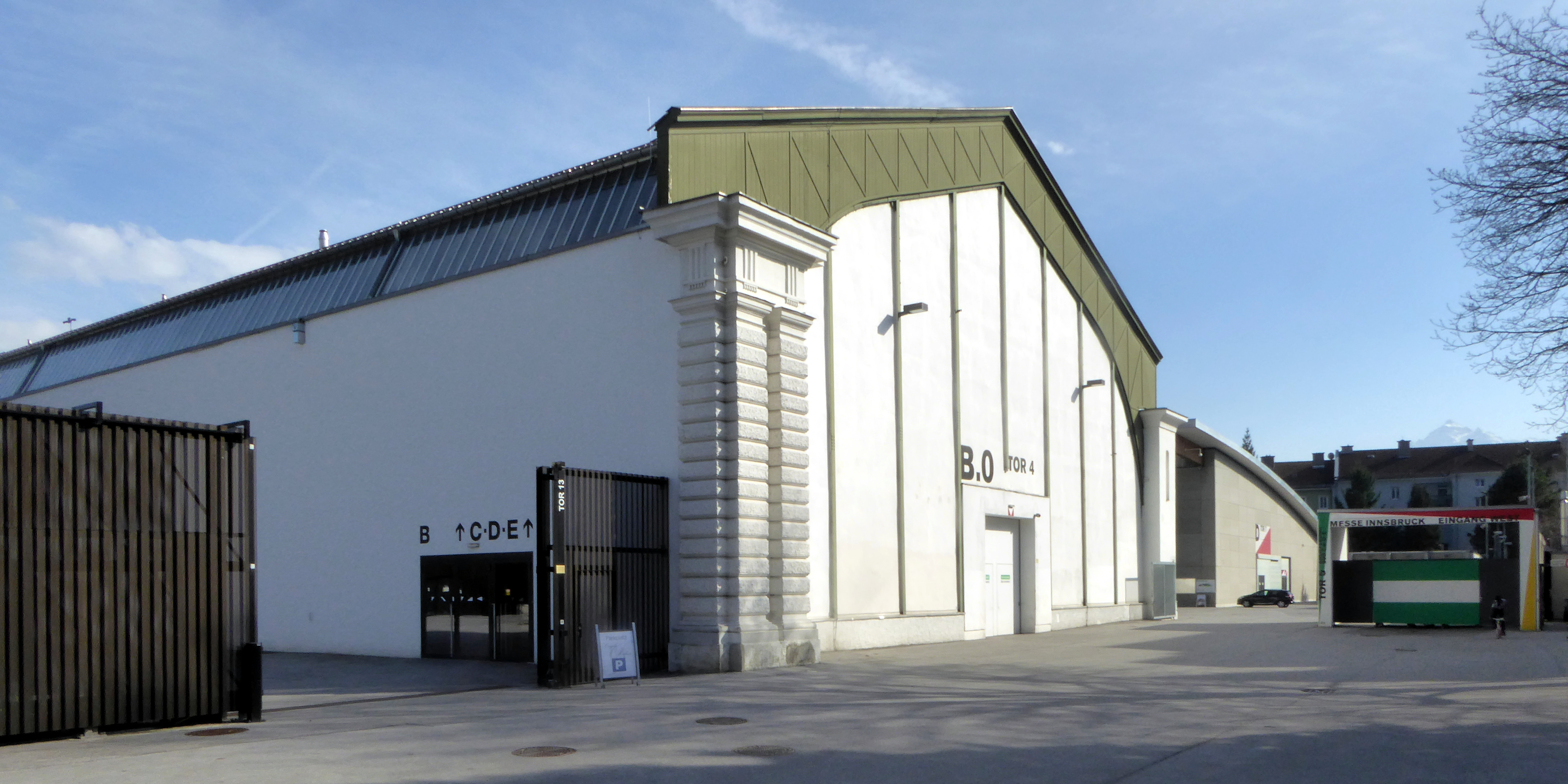
Messehalle B, Innsbruck

Messehalle is a convention center and sports venue located in Innsbruck, Austria. The venue hosted some of the ice hockey games for both the 1964 and 1976 Winter Olympics.
