= Walter Ausserdorfer =

Italian luger (1939–2019)

Olympic medal record

Luge

Representing Italy
Bronze medal – third place	1964 Innsbruck	Men's doubles

Walter Ausserdorfer (also Außerdorfer; 18 April 1939 – 27 October 2019) was an Italian luger who competed during the early 1960s. He was born in Tiers. He won the bronze medal in the men's doubles event at the 1964 Winter Olympics in Innsbruck.

Ausserdorfer died on 27 October 2019, at the age of 80.
