= Leonid Volkov (ice hockey) =

Russian ice hockey player

- Born: December 9, 1934 Gorky, Soviet Union
- Died: May 17, 1995 (aged 60)
- KHL team: Torpedo Gorky; HC CSKA Moscow
Medal record
Men's ice hockey
Representing the Soviet Union
Gold medal – first place	1964 Innsbruck	Team

Leonid Ivanovich Volkov (Russian: Леонид Иванович Волков; December 9, 1934 – May 17, 1995) was a Russian ice hockey player who played in the Soviet Hockey League. Born in Gorky, Soviet Union, he played for Torpedo Gorky and HC CSKA Moscow. He was inducted into the Russian and Soviet Hockey Hall of Fame in 1964.
