= Villy Haugen =

Norwegian speed skater (1944–2026)

Personal information
- Born: 27 September 1944 Leksvik Municipality, German-occupied Norway
- Died: 22 June 2026 (aged 81)

Sport
- Country: Norway
- Sport: Men's speed skating
- Club: Sportsklubben Falken
Medal record
Representing Norway
Men's speed skating
Olympic Games
Bronze medal – third place	1964 Innsbruck	1,500 m

Villy Haugen (27 September 1944 – 22 June 2026) was a Norwegian speed skater.

Haugen earned a bronze medal in 1500 m. at the 1964 Winter Olympics in Innsbruck. He came in eighth place in 500 m. at the same Olympics. Haugen represented SK Falken in Trondheim.

Haugen died on 22 June 2026, at the age of 81.

== Personal records ==
41,1 - 1.25,0 - 2.09,9 - 4.42,4 - 8.17,5 - 17.47,2
