= Luge at the 1964 Winter Olympics =

Luge at the IX Olympic Winter Games
- Venue: Olympic Sliding Centre Innsbruck
- Dates: 30 January – 4 February 1964
- Competitors: 68 from 12 nations

Luge at the 1964 Winter Olympics consisted of three events at Olympic Sliding Centre Innsbruck. The competition took place between 30 January and 4 February 1964.

This was the first appearance of Luge in the Winter Olympics. It was originally scheduled to be added in 1960, but as there was no venue built for it in Squaw Valley, the sport's debut came in 1964.

== Medal summary ==
=== Medal table ===
Rank	Nation	Gold	Silver	Bronze	Total
1	United Team of Germany	2	2	1	5
2	Austria	1	1	1	3
3	Italy	0	0	1	1
Totals (3 entries)		3	3	3	9

Germany won five of the nine medals available, including two gold medals.

=== Events ===
Event	Gold		Silver		Bronze	
Men's singles	Thomas Köhler; United Team of Germany	3:26.77	Klaus Bonsack; United Team of Germany	3:27.04	Hans Plenk; United Team of Germany	3:30.15
Women's singles	Ortrun Enderlein; United Team of Germany	3:24.67	Ilse Geisler; United Team of Germany	3:27.42	Leni Thurner; Austria	3:29.06
Doubles	Austria; Josef Feistmantl; Manfred Stengl	1:41.62	Austria; Reinhold Senn; Helmut Thaler	1:41.91	Italy; Walter Ausserdorfer; Sigisfredo Mair	1:42.87

== Participating NOCs ==
Twelve nations participated in Luge at the Innsbruck Games.

- Argentina (1)
- Austria (9)
- Canada (1)
- Czechoslovakia (6)
- United Team of Germany (9)
- Great Britain (2)
- Italy (7)
- Liechtenstein (3)
- Norway (4)
- Poland (8)
- Switzerland (9)
- United States (9)
