= Oleg Zaytsev =

- Born: August 4, 1939 Moscow, Soviet Union
- Died: March 1, 1993 (aged 53) Moscow, Soviet Union
- Height: 5 ft 10 in (178 cm)
- Weight: 190 lb (86 kg; 13 st 8 lb)
- Position: Defence
- Shot: Left
- National team: Soviet Union
- Playing career: 1959–1969

Oleg Alekseevich Zaytsev (b. August 4, 1939 in Moscow, Soviet Union - d. March 1, 1993) was an ice hockey defenceman who played in the Soviet Hockey League. He played for HC CSKA Moscow. He was inducted into the Russian and Soviet Hockey Hall of Fame in 1966.

He won two Olympic gold medals competing for the Soviet Union hockey team in 1964 and 1968.
