= Boris Mayorov =

Russian ice hockey player and coach

- Born: February 11, 1938 (age 88) Moscow, USSR
- Height: 5 ft 9 in (175 cm)
- Weight: 152 lb (69 kg; 10 st 12 lb)
- Position: Left Wing
- Shot: Right
- Played for: HC Spartak Moscow
- National team: Soviet Union
- Playing career: 1955–1970
Medal record
Men's ice hockey
Olympic Games
Gold medal – first place	1964 Innsbruck
Gold medal – first place	1968 Grenoble
World Championships
Bronze medal – third place	1961 Geneva
Gold medal – first place	1963 Stockholm
Gold medal – first place	1965 Tampere
Gold medal – first place	1966 Ljubljana
Gold medal – first place	1967 Vienna

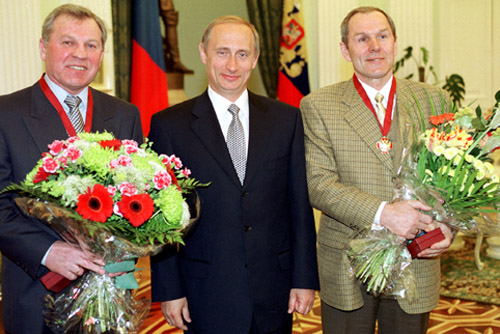
Mayorov (left) and Vladimir Putin in 2001

Boris Aleksandrovich Mayorov (Russian: Борис Александрович Майоров; born 11 February 1938) is a retired Russian ice hockey player who played in the Soviet Hockey League. He played for HC Spartak Moscow and was inducted into the Russian and Soviet Hockey Hall of Fame in 1963. Mayorov was inducted into the player category of the International Ice Hockey Federation Hall of Fame in 1999.

His twin brother Yevgeni Mayorov was also an international ice hockey player.

== International statistics ==
Year	Team	Event	GP	G	A	Pts	PIM
1961	Soviet Union	WC	7	7	10	17	6
1963	Soviet Union	WC	7	3	6	9	0
1964	Soviet Union	OLY	8	5	5	10	0
1965	Soviet Union	WC	7	5	3	8	6
1966	Soviet Union	WC	7	3	3	6	2
1967	Soviet Union	WC	7	2	3	5	9
1968	Soviet Union	OLY	7	3	3	6	2
Senior totals			50	28	33	51	25
