= Klavdiya Boyarskikh =

Soviet cross-country skier

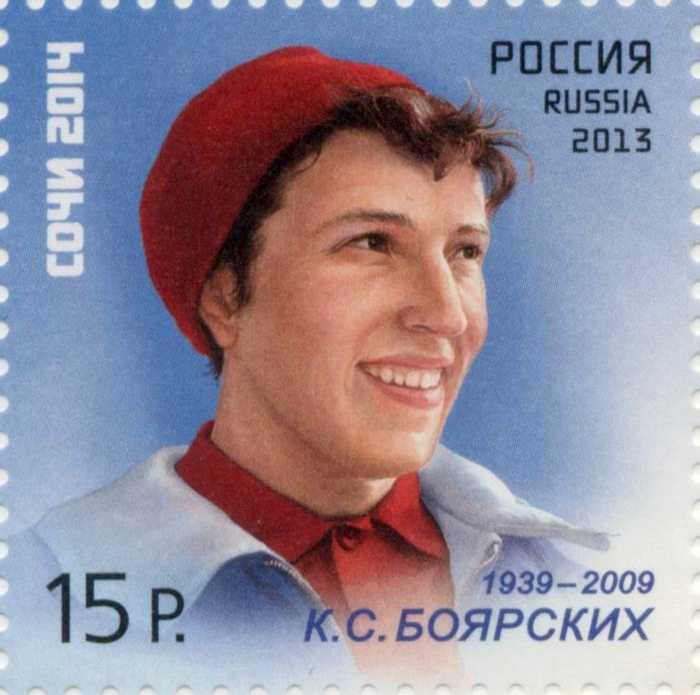
- Klavdiya Boyarskikh on a 2013 Russian stamp from the series "Sports Legends"

Personal information
- Born: Клавдия Сергеевна Боярских; 11 November 1939 Verkhnyaya Pyshma, Sverdlovsk Oblast, Russian SFSR, Soviet Union
- Died: 12 December 2009 (aged 70) Yekaterinburg, Russia
- Height: 159 cm (5 ft 3 in)
- Weight: 60 kg (132 lb)
- Relative: Sofia Boyarskikh

Sport
- Sport: Cross-country skiing
- Club: Trud Sverdlovsk
Medal record
Women's cross-country skiing
Representing Soviet Union
Olympic Games
| Gold medal – first place | 1964 Innsbruck | 5 km |
| Gold medal – first place | 1964 Innsbruck | 10 km |
| Gold medal – first place | 1964 Innsbruck | 3 × 5 km relay |
World Championships
| Gold medal – first place | 1966 Oslo | 10 km |
| Gold medal – first place | 1966 Oslo | 3 × 5 km relay |
| Silver medal – second place | 1966 Oslo | 5 km |

Klavdiya Sergeyevna Boyarskikh (Russian: Клавдия Сергеевна Боярских; 11 November 1939 – 12 December 2009) was a Russian cross-country skier who competed in the 1960s.

In 1964, Boyarskikh won her first Soviet titles, in the 5 km and relay, and was selected for the Olympic Games. There she ran the fastest leg of the 3 × 5 km relay, and became the first female cross-country skier to win all Olympic events. In 1966, she won two more national titles, in the 5 and 10 km, as well as two world titles. Next year she had her last two national victories, in the 5 km and relay. She also won three times at the Holmenkollen ski festival with two wins in 10 km (1965, 1966) and one win in the 5 km (1967). Boyarskikh retired in 1968 and until her death worked as a skiing coach with Lokomotiv Sverdlovsk. Since 1970, the annual Klavdiya Boyarskikh Cup in cross-country skiing is held in Sverdlovsk (formerly and now Yekaterinburg). Her living relatives include Sofia Boyarskikh and Michael Boyarskikh.

== Cross-country skiing results ==
All results are sourced from the International Ski Federation (FIS).

=== Olympic Games ===
- 3 medals – (3 gold)

| Year | Age | 5 km | 10 km | 3 × 5 km relay |
|---|---|---|---|---|
| 1964 | 24 | Gold | Gold | Gold |

=== World Championships ===
- 3 medals – (2 gold, 1 silver)

| Year | Age | 5 km | 10 km | 3 × 5 km relay |
|---|---|---|---|---|
| 1966 | 26 | Silver | Gold | Gold |
