= Nikolay Kiselyov (athlete) =

Soviet skier

Medal record

Men's Nordic combined

Representing Soviet Union

Olympic Games
Silver medal – second place	1964 Innsbruck	Individual

Nikolay Fyodorovich Kiselyov (Russian: Никола́й Фёдорович Киселёв; 25 October 1939 – 2005) was a Soviet Nordic combined athlete, Master of Sports of the USSR, International Class. He trained at the Armed Forces sports society in Leningrad. His best finish was a silver medal at the 1964 Winter Olympics in Innsbruck in the individual event.
