= Tatyana Sidorova =

Russian speed skater

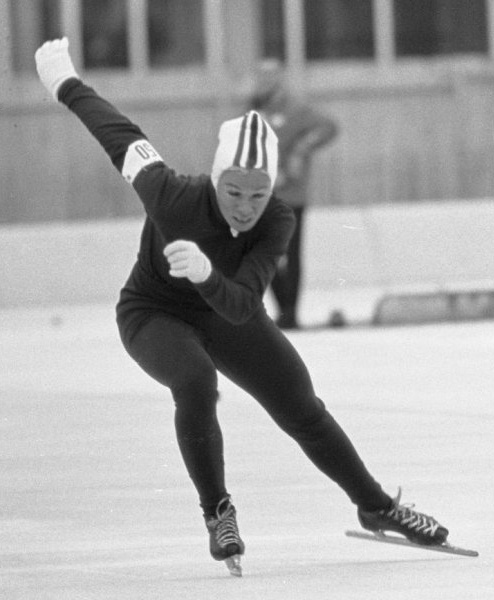
- Tatyana Sidorova in 1968

Personal information
- Born: 25 July 1936 (age 89) Chelyabinsk, Russian SFSR, Soviet Union
- Height: 1.58 m (5 ft 2 in)

Sport
- Sport: Speed skating
- Club: Lokomotiv Chelyabinsk
Medal record
Representing Soviet Union
Olympic Games
Bronze medal – third place	1964 Innsbruck	500 m

Tatyana Aleksandrovna Sidorova (Russian: Татьяна Александровна Сидорова, born 25 July 1936) is a Russian speed skater who competed for the Soviet Union in the 1964 and 1968 Winter Olympics. In 1964 she won the bronze medal in the 500 m event. Four years later she finished ninth in the 500 m competition.

She set three world records in 500 m, one in 1968 and two in 1970, and won three Soviet titles, in 500 m (1968, 1970) and 1,000 m (1966) events. After retiring from senior skating she competed in the masters category, winning Russian titles in 1997–2000 and a world title in 2001.

Personal bests:

- 500 m – 42.8 (1973)
- 1000 m – 1:29.9 (1970)
- 1500 m – 2:21.8 (1970)
- 3000 m – 5:08.1 (1970)
