= Eduard Ivanov =

Russian ice hockey player

Eduard Georgievich Ivanov (April 25, 1938 – January 15, 2012) was a Russian ice hockey player who played in the Soviet Hockey League. Ivanov was born in Moscow, Soviet Union. He played for HC CSKA Moscow and appeared in 300 games. In international play, Ivanov appeared in 79 games over his career. He was inducted into the Russian and Soviet Hockey Hall of Fame in 1963. After his playing career Ivanov became a coach with SKA Moskva Oblast and director of CSKA Moskva sports school from 1979 to 1988.
