= Gennady Vaganov =

Soviet cross-country skier (born 1936)

Medal record

Men's cross-country skiing

Representing Soviet Union

Olympic Games
Bronze medal – third place	1960 Squaw Valley	4 x 10 km
Bronze medal – third place	1964 Innsbruck	4 x 10 km

World Championships
Bronze medal – third place	1962 Zakopane	4 x 10 km

Gennady Viktorovich Vaganov (Russian: Генна́дий Ви́кторович Вага́нов; born 25 November 1936, in the village of Duvan, Duvansky District, Bashkir ASSR) was a Soviet cross-country skier who competed during the early 1960s, training at the Armed Forces sports society in Moscow. He earned two bronze medals in the 4x10 km relay at the 1960 Winter Olympics and 1964 Winter Olympics.

Vaganov won a bronze medal in the 4x10 km relay at the 1962 FIS Nordic World Ski Championships.

Vaganov was awarded Order of the Badge of Honor (1960).
