= Ivan Utrobin =

Soviet cross-country skier (1934–2020)

Medal record

Men's cross country skiing

Representing Soviet Union

Olympic Games
Bronze medal – third place	1964 Innsbruck	4 × 10 km

World Championships
Bronze medal – third place	1962 Zakopane	4 × 10 km

Ivan Stepanovich Utrobin (Russian: Иван Степанович Утробин) (March 10, 1934 – June 25, 2020) was a Russian cross-country skier who competed during the early 1960s for the Soviet Union, training at VSS Trud in Moscow Oblast. He earned a bronze medal in the 4 × 10 km relay at 1964 Winter Olympics in Innsbruck. He also won a bronze medal in the 4 × 10 km relay at the 1962 FIS Nordic World Ski Championships.
