= Ross Milne (alpine skier) =

Australian alpine skier

Personal information
- Born: 4 October 1944 Victoria, Australia
- Died: 25 January 1964 (aged 19) Innsbruck, Austria

Skiing career
- Sport: Alpine skiing
- Club: Falls Creek
- Disciplines: Downhill, giant slalom, slalom

Olympics
- Teams: 1 – (1964)

Leslie Ross Milne (4 October 1944 – 25 January 1964) was an alpine ski racer from Australia.

Entered in the men's downhill at the 1964 Winter Olympics in Innsbruck, Milne died of a head injury after he lost control during a training run at Patscherkofel and struck a tree at more than 60 miles per hour. Milne's death was the second fatality at the 1964 Winter Games. Three days prior, British luge racer Kazimierz Kay-Skrzypecki died from injuries sustained in a training run.

An inquiry held by the organising committee said that Milne "caught an edge". Hugh Weir reported to the Australian Olympic Federation that

Because Ross Milne was only seventeen years of age, the question was raised at the [Innsbruck] IOC meeting as to whether inexperienced people were being sent to compete in ... snow sports which contain an element of danger.

Dr Blaxland said that he was wrong about his age (Milne was nineteen), and that the IOC was wrong to suggest he was inexperienced:

In our view Ross Milne was an extremely competent skier. He had competed in Australian championships at least four years before, and we considered him to be an experienced skier. He had been in Europe before ... His fall was not due to lack of skill on his part

Manager John Wagner said that Milne had found the path 150 metres (500 ft) ahead of him obscured by contestants congregating because the top part of the downhill course was overcrowded, and tried to slow down "on a spot which was not prepared for stopping or swinging". He argued that the accident might have been prevented by stricter management of the downhill course, which had a hundred racers on it. He also said that "any of the top skiers would probably have been in difficulty in a similar situation."

Following Milne's death and a serious injury to Edmund Schaedler of Liechtenstein, some minor safety improvements were made to the downhill course prior to the race on 30 January.

Milne had learned to ski at Falls Creek ski area in the Australian Alps and had spent the previous winter of 1963 racing in Europe. He was buried in his home town of Myrtleford in Victoria, where his family farmed tobacco.

Milne's younger brother Malcolm (b. 1948) competed on the World Cup circuit and in the 1968 and 1972 Winter Olympics. The suggestion that racers from Australia and New Zealand should not compete on downhill courses gave him motivation to prove otherwise. He became the first non-European to win a men's World Cup downhill race in December 1969, held at Val-d'Isère, France. It was also the first World Cup podium by an alpine racer from the Southern Hemisphere.
