= Berta Kolokoltseva =

Russian speed skater (born 1937)

Medal record

Representing Soviet Union

Women's speed skating

Olympic Games
Bronze medal – third place	1964 Innsbruck	1500 m

Albertina "Berta" Iosifovna Kolokoltseva (Russian: Альбертина "Берта" Иосифовна Колокольцева, born October 29, 1937) is a Russian speed skater who competed for the Soviet Union in the 1964 Winter Olympics, and won the bronze medal in the 1500 metres event.
