= Irina Yegorova =

Russian speed skater

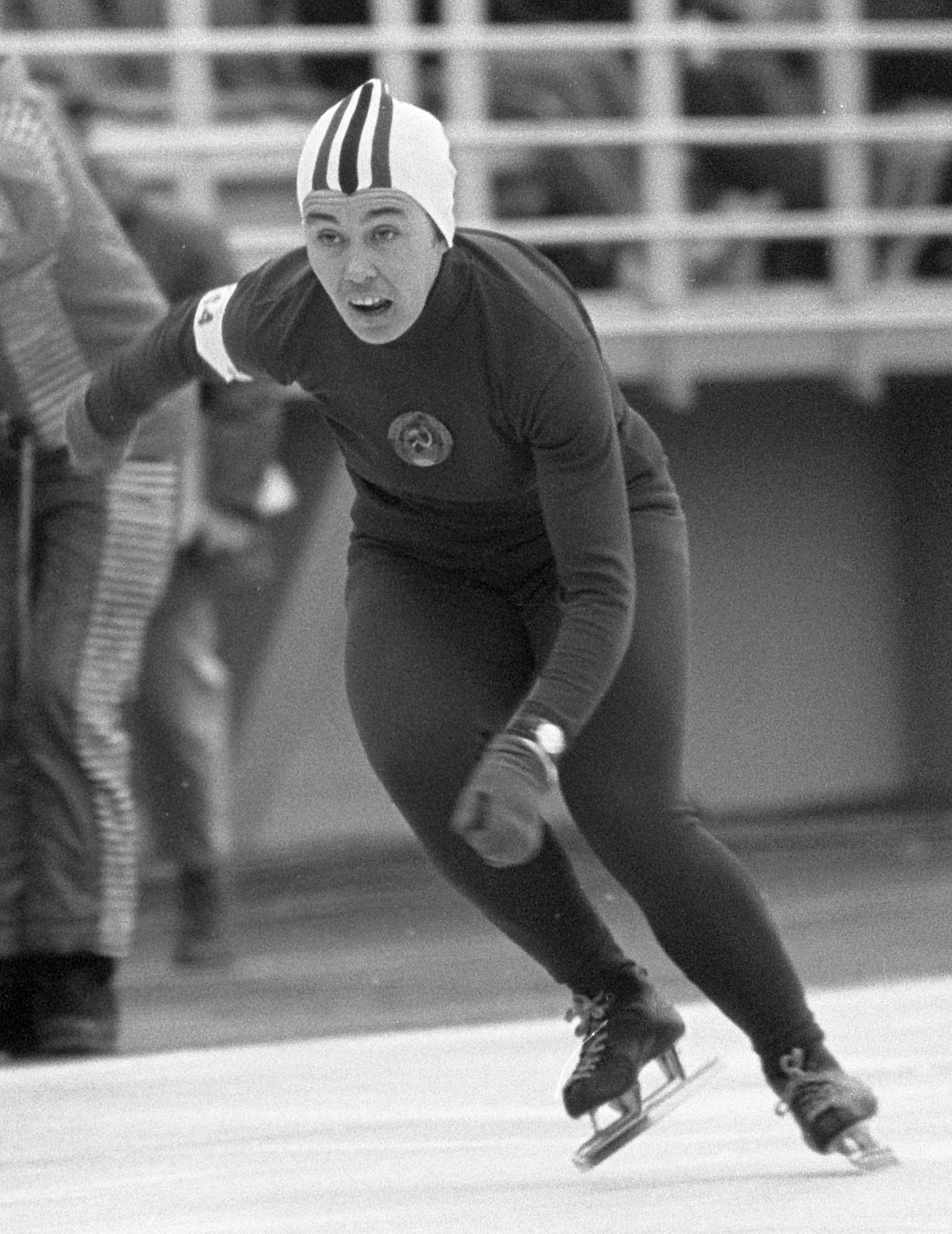
- Irina Yegorova in 1968

Personal information
- Born: 8 April 1940 (age 86) Ivanovo, Russian SFSR, Soviet Union
- Height: 1.67 m (5 ft 6 in)
- Weight: 65 kg (143 lb)

Sport
- Sport: Speed skating
- Club: Burevestnik Ivanovo; Dynamo Moscow Oblast
Medal record
Representing the Soviet Union
Olympic Games
Silver medal – second place	1964 Innsbruck	500 m
Silver medal – second place	1964 Innsbruck	1000 m

Irina Nikolayevna Yegorova (Russian: Ирина Николаевна Егорова, born 8 April 1940) is a Russian speed skater who competed for the Soviet Union at the 1964 and 1968 Winter Olympics. In 1964 she won the silver medal in the 500 and 1000 m events. Four years later she finished fifth in the 1000 m and ninth in the 500 m contest.

Yegorova became known internationally in 1962–1963, when she skated 500 m and 1000 m in world record times, even though her records were not officially recognised. In 1963 she won a silver medal in the 500 m at the world championships and finished fourth all-around. In 1964, just a week after the Olympics, she won the 500 m at the world championships. She continued dominating sprint events at world all-around championships until 1967, when she won silver in the 500 m, but she never finished within the podium overall. Domestically she won only one title, in 1963; she finished second in 1969, but set a sprint all-around world record in late December.

In 1963 Yegorova graduated from the Ivanovo Textile Institute, where she then worked until 1964. Between 1964 and 1967 she was employed at a penal colony nearby, and after that coached speed skating in Ivanovo and Moscow. From 1989 to 2004 she worked as a school teacher in Ivanovo, and later resumed her coaching activities. In 1995 she won the national 500 m title in the masters division.

Yegorova was married, but her husband died by 2011; she has a son.

Personal bests:

- 500 m – 45.0 (1968)
- 1000 m – 1:31.2 (1970)
- 1500 m – 2:24.6 (1962)
- 3000 m – 5:10.8 (1969)
