= Yevdokiya Mekshilo =

Soviet cross-country skier

Personal information
- Born: 23 March 1931 Gorno-Altaysk, Russia
- Died: 16 January 2013 (aged 81) St. Petersburg, Russia
- Height: 161 cm (5 ft 3 in)

Sport
- Sport: Skiing
Medal record
Women's cross-country skiing
Representing Soviet Union
Olympic Games
Gold medal – first place	1964 Innsbruck	3 × 5 km relay
Silver medal – second place	1964 Innsbruck	10 km

Yevdokiya Panteleyevna Mekshilo (Russian: Евдокия Пантелеевна Мекшило, 23 March 1931 – 16 January 2013) was a female Soviet cross-country skier who competed in the 1960s for Armed Forces sports society. At the 1964 Winter Olympics, she won a gold in the 3 × 5 km relay and a silver in the 10 km event. She was born in Gorno-Altaysk.
