= Igor Voronchikhin =

Cross-country skier

Medal record

Men's cross-country skiing

Representing Soviet Union

Olympic Games
Bronze medal – third place	1964 Innsbruck	30 km
Bronze medal – third place	1964 Innsbruck	4 x 10 km

Igor Nikolaevich Voronchikin (Russian: И́горь Николаевич Ворончи́хин; born 14 April 1938; died 10 March 2009) was a Soviet cross-country skier who competed during the early 1960s, training at Burevestnik in Moscow. He earned two bronze medals in the 1964 Winter Olympics in the 30 km and the 4x10 km relay.
