= 1964 Winter Olympics =

Multi-sport event in Innsbruck, Austria

IX Olympic Winter Games
- Emblem of the 1964 Winter Olympics (Note: The emblem represents the coat of arms of Innsbruck, which shows the bridge on the Inn River that connects the old town and the Hötting district.)
- Location: Innsbruck, Austria
- Nations: 36
- Athletes: 1,095 (896 men, 199 women)
- Events: 34 in 6 sports (10 disciplines)
- Opening: 29 January 1964
- Closing: 9 February 1964
- Opened by: President Adolf Schärf
- Cauldron: Josl Rieder
- Stadium: Bergiselschanze

The 1964 Winter Olympics, officially known as the IX Olympic Winter Games (German: IX. Olympische Winterspiele) and commonly known as Innsbruck 1964 (Austro-Bavarian: Innschbruck 1964), were a winter multi-sport event which was celebrated in Innsbruck, Austria, from January 29 to February 9, 1964. The city was already an Olympic candidate, unsuccessfully bidding to host the 1960 Games. Innsbruck won the 1964 Games bid, defeating the cities of Calgary in Canada and Lahti in Finland. The sports venues, many of which were built for the Games, were located within a radius of 20 km (12 mi) around Innsbruck. The Games included 1,091 athletes from 36 nations, which was a record for the Winter Games at the time. Athletes participated in six sports and ten disciplines which bring together a total of thirty-four official events, seven more than the 1960 Winter Olympic Games. The luge made its debut on the Olympic program. Three Asian nations made their Winter Games debut: North Korea, India and Mongolia.

The Soviet Union broke the record for the most gold and overall medals at a single Winter Olympics, with eleven and twenty five respectively, and finished first in the medal table. The USSR was followed by Austria, the host country, which won twelve medals, four of which were gold. Soviet athletes Lidia Skoblikova won all four women's races of speed skating and Klavdiya Boyarskikh won all three events of cross-country skiing. The Swedish cross-country skier Sixten Jernberg, a three-time medalist at these Games, became the first athlete to collect nine medals at the Winter Games. In alpine skiing, the French sisters Christine and Marielle Goitschel each obtained a gold and a silver medal. Before the Games, the Austrian army was mobilized to deal with the lack of snow. They brought thousands of cubic meters of it from Brenner Pass, close to the Italian border. The Olympic Winter Games was held for a second time at Innsbruck in 1976.

The Olympic Torch was carried by Joseph Rieder, a former alpine skier who had participated in the 1956 Winter Olympics.

The Games were affected by the deaths of Australian alpine skier Ross Milne and British luge slider Kazimierz Kay-Skrzypeski, during training, and by the deaths, three years earlier, of the entire United States figure skating team and family members.

== Bid and background for the Games ==
=== Host city selection ===
The city of Innsbruck submitted its first Olympic bid in the 1950s to host the 1960 Winter Olympic Games. The Austrians had a convincing bid and were viewed as the favorites to host the games. However, in the second round of the vote the members of the International Olympic Committee (IOC) selected the American city of Squaw Valley due to its ambitious designs.

A month later, the Innsbruck authorities decided to enter a bid again for the 1964 Winter Games. On 26 May 1959, during the 55th session of the (IOC) in Munich, West Germany, the Austrians were selected in a landslide for the Games with 49 votes in the first round, ahead of Calgary (Canada), which obtained 9 votes and Lahti (Finland), which did not receive a vote.

1964 Winter Olympics bidding result
City	Country	Round 1
Innsbruck	Austria	49
Calgary	Canada	9
Lahti	Finland	0

=== Political situation ===
Despite the construction of the Berlin Wall by East Germany in 1961, which increased tensions between East and West and the fact that the East Germans wanted to have their own team, the IOC managed to maintain the United Team of Germany for the third consecutive Olympiad. In the 1960s, the IOC also discussed the Olympic participation of South Africa, a country immersed in the apartheid regime. During the Games in Innbruck, the IOC President Avery Brundage announced that the country would not be able to participate in the 1964 Summer Olympics because of its policy of racial segregation in sport. On the other hand, several African countries which had become independent joined the Olympic movement: the national Olympic committees of Algeria, of Congo, from Nigeria and Sierra Leone were recognized by the IOC during the session held during the Innsbruck Games. The number of IOC member nations increased to 114. In addition, the Innsbruck Games were used for the dissemination of political messages. Five Iranian students were arrested after marching with banners hostile to the shah. Twenty other Iranians, who demonstrated for the release of prisoners in their country, were also imprisoned.

== Organization ==
=== Organizing committee ===
The organizing committee of the IX Winter Olympics in Innsbruck 1964 was formed on 2 June 1959. Heinrich Drimmel, President of the Austrian Olympic Committee and Federal Minister of Education, was elected as its president and Friedl Wolfgang was elected as its secretary-general. The organizing committee was made up of the general assembly, the board of directors, and the executive committee, as well as eight sub-committees created to manage the different aspects of the Games: finance, construction, sports, transport, etc. accommodation and medical services, lodging, administration and checks.

=== Financial aspects ===
The Innsbruck Games cost around one billion schillings, or 40 million US dollars distributed among the organizing committee, the Austrian state, the Land of Tyrol and the city of Innsbruck. The organizers tried to reduce the expenses related to the provisional elements, and to invest more money for the facilities which would continue to be used after the Games. The Olympiaeisstadion costs 75 million schillings, the renovation of the Bergisel Ski Jump 15 million and the Olympic Sliding Centre Innsbruck 10 million. The development of ski slopes, cross-country skiing and biathlon required a total of 29 million. The Olympic village, intended to become a leisure center, costs 174 million. A total of 225 million was invested to renovate and develop the road network in the region.

=== Television ===
The 1964 edition was the third time that the Winter Games were broadcast on television and the second time that exclusive broadcasting rights were sold. This was a substantial increase: where they were US$50,000 in 1960, the broadcast rights yielded US$937,000 in 1964, which was approximately 24 million schillings. Thirty countries broadcast the Games. The American channel ABC paid nearly 15.4 million schillings, or 64 per cent of the broadcast rights revenue. The Eurovision network spent around 7.6 million for 16 countries, the Soviet television 600,000 Rbls and the Intervision network US$550,000 for six countries in Western Europe. The CTV Television Network paid CA$5,000 for the exclusive broadcast rights in Canada.

== Schedule ==
=== Calendar ===
The Games were held over twelve days, from January 29 to February 9. Thirty-four events were on the program, an increase from the twenty-seven at Squaw Valley four years earlier. Three luge events (individual men and women, doubles men) were included in the Olympic program. Bobsled, which was absent from the 1960 Games due to the cost of building the track, returned to the Games. Ski jumping was divided into two events (small and large hill) and the women's 5-kilometer was added in cross-country skiing. Ice stock sport (Eisstockschießen), a variant of curling popular in Alpine countries, was a demonstration sport as in Garmisch-Partenkirchen in 1936. In total, 1,073,000 people attend the various events. The disciplines which attracted the most spectators were alpine skiing and ice hockey.

OC	Opening ceremony	●	Event competitions	1	Event finals	CC	Closing ceremony

January 1964 February 1964	29 Wed	30 Thu	31 Fri	1 Sat	2 Sun	3 Mon	4 Tue	5 Wed	6 Thu	7 Fri	8 Sat	9 Sun	Events
Ceremonies	OC											CC	—N/a
Biathlon							1						1
Bobsleigh			●	1					●	1			2
Nordic combined					●	1							1
Ice hockey	●	●	●	●	●	●	●	●	●	●	●	1	1
Luge		●	●			2		1					3
Figure skating	1	●	●		1	●	●		1				3
Speed skating		1	1	1	1		1	1	1	1			8
Ski jumping			1									1	2
Alpine skiing		1		1	1	1			1		1		6
Cross-country skiing		1		1	1			2		1	1		7
Eisstock											●	●	—
Daily medal events	1	3	2	4	4	4	2	4	3	3	2	2	34
Total	1	4	6	10	14	18	20	24	27	30	32	34	34

† The numeral indicates the number of event finals for each sport held that day.

=== Weather conditions before the Games ===
In the weeks leading up to the Games, temperatures often rose above 0 °C (32 °F) due to the foehn, a hot, dry wind. There was no major snowfall for seven weeks, and the rain melted snow and ice at sports venues. This was the first time in around a century that the snowfall had been so low in Tyrol. Two weeks before the start of the Games, thousands of Austrian soldiers were mobilized to transport by truck 40,000 m^{3} of snow from the Brenner Pass, close to the Italian border, and spread it by hand on the ski slopes. 20,000 m^{3} of snow was built up, and 20,000 blocks of ice were transported to the bobsleigh and toboggan run.

=== Opening ceremony ===
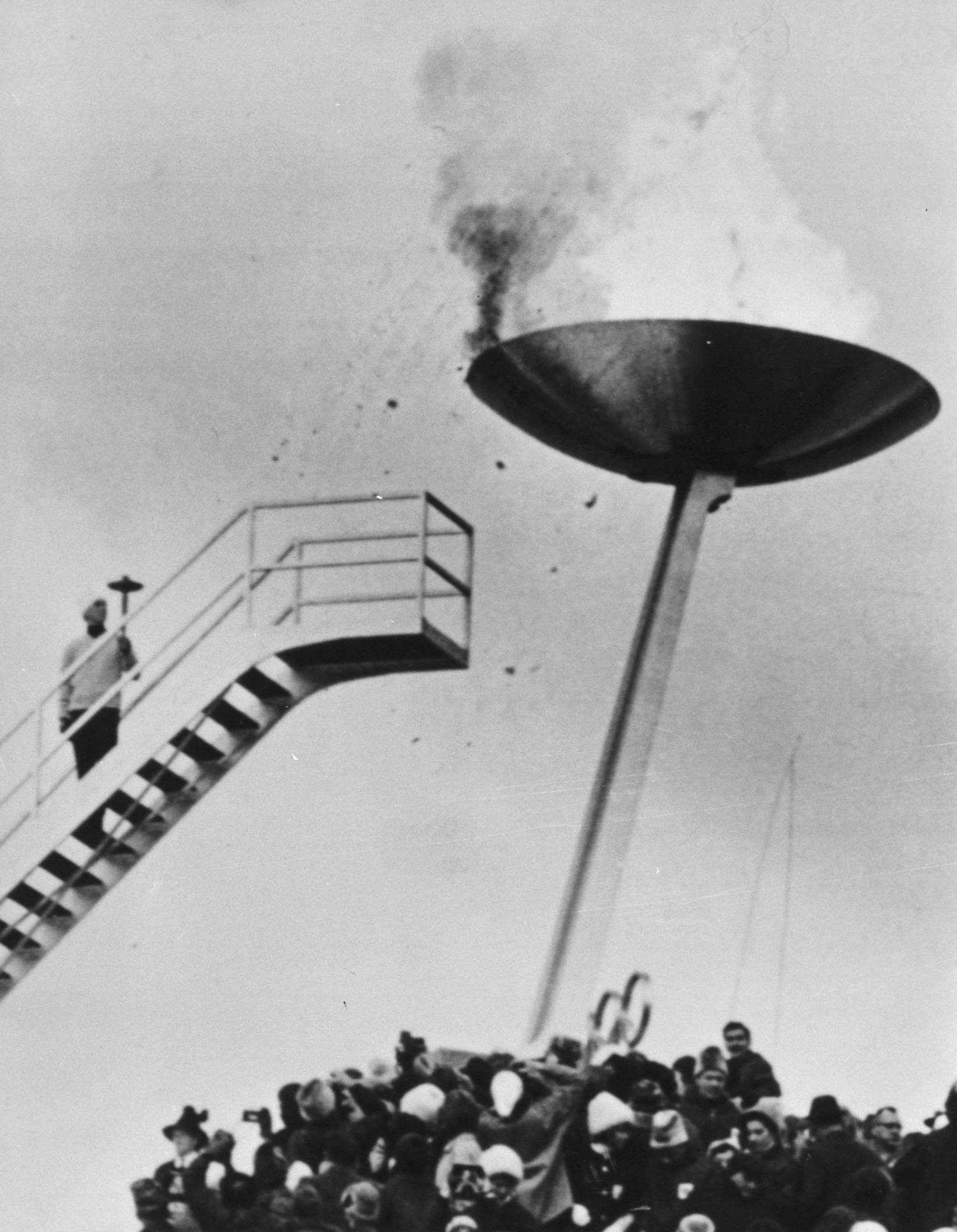
Winter Olympics open in Innsbruck, Josl Rieder lights the Olympic Caldron

The opening ceremony took place on January 29 at the Bergisel Ski Jump stadium in front of approximately 50,000 spectators. The Games were opened by the president of Austria, Adolf Schärf. The bobsledder Paul Aste took the Olympic oath. Aste modified the oath slightly: instead of saying "for the glory of sport and the honor of our countries", he replaced the word "country" with "teams" to remove the nationalist elements of the oath. This was the first time that the Olympic flame of the Winter Games has been lit in front of the Temple of Hera in Olympia, Greece. In the stadium, the alpine skier Josef Rieder lit the cauldron. Tyrolean orchestras performed during the ceremony.

== Events ==
=== Biathlon ===
The biathlon made its second Olympic appearance. As in 1960, the only event contested was a 20-kilometer cross-country ski race with four shooting ranges of 100 to 250 meters. Soviet athlete Vladimir Melanin, a heavy favorite, won the event. This was the first time he did not miss any of his twenty shots in a major competition. His compatriot Aleksandr Privalov, who also had a clean shoot, was second by more than three minutes and the Norwegian Olav Jordet, who missed a target, won the bronze medal. The Finn Veikko Hakulinen was the fastest, but missed six shots and finished 15th.

=== Bobsleigh ===
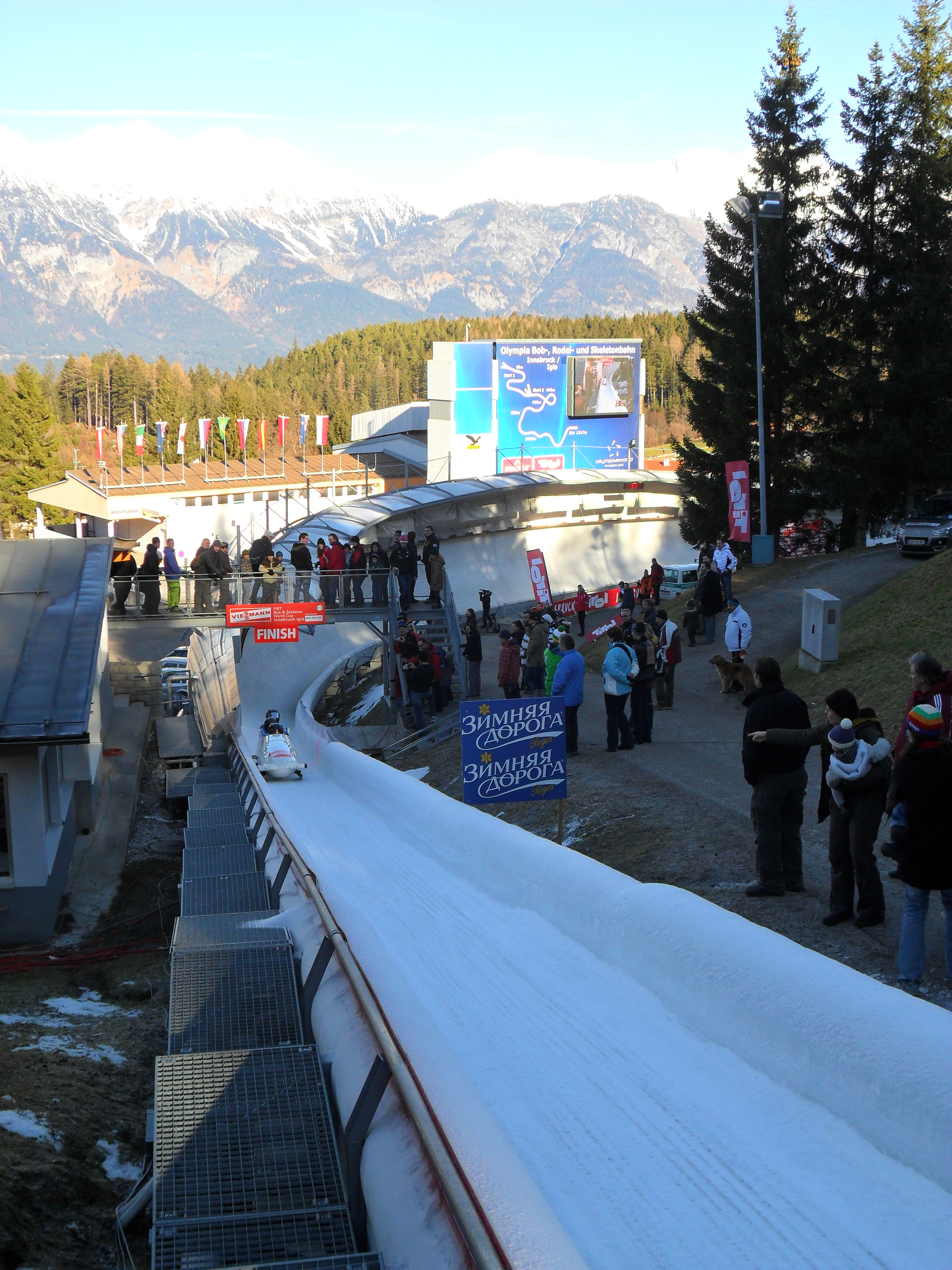
The Olympic Sliding Centre Innsbruck in 2011.

The bobsleigh was not on the program for the 1960 Winter Olympic Games, at Squaw Valley in the United States, because of the low number of crews and the cost of building the track. In 1964, bobsleigh events made a comeback and were contested on the Olympic Sliding Centre Innsbruck. Neither of the two Olympic champion teams, Great Britain and Canada, had a track in their country at the time.

During the first round of the two-man event, the bobsleigh of the British Robin Dixon and Tony Nash was damaged and the competition's favorite, the Italian Eugenio Monti, lent them an axle bolt. After two rounds, the British beat the two Italian teams. After the third set, the Italians Sergio Zardini and Romano Bonagura beat Dixon and Nash by just five hundredths of a second. Finally, Dixon and Nash become Olympic champions with 12 hundredths ahead of silver medalists Zardini and Bonagura and 73 over third, Eugenio Monti and Sergio Siorpaes. This is the only time in history that the British have been Olympic bobsleigh champions. After the Games, Monti received the first International Fair Play Committee Pierre de Coubertin World Trophy for his sportsmanship towards the British team.

The Canadians surprised in the four-man bobsleigh event. As the country competed for the first time in the Olympic bobsleigh events, the pilot's team Vic Emery won the first round, breaking the track record, and increased his lead in the following three rounds. Canada won gold by more than a second ahead of Erwin Thaler 's Austrian bobsleigh and Eugenio Monti' s Italian bobsleigh.

=== Nordic combined ===
The Nordic combined event took place in the village of Seefeld in Tirol. On the first day, the competitors did three jumps and the two best results are recorded. The next day, they did a 15-kilometer cross-country ski race. The final ranking was established with a new points system.

The reigning Olympic champion, the German Georg Thoma, was first ahead of the Norwegian Tormod Knutsen and the Soviet Nikolay Kiselyov after the jumps. Knutsen needed to beat Thoma by at least twelve seconds in the cross-country ski race to pass him, which he did, winning by 1.33 and becoming Olympic champion. Kisseliov wins the silver medal. Thoma, who had wax problems and fell twice during the race, was third, just 0.16 points behind Kisseliov after a tenth-place finish in cross-country skiing.

=== Ice hockey ===
The matches of ice hockey were played in the Olympiaeisstadion and the Messehalle. The sixteen participating teams first played a match to determine their group for the rest of the competition: group A (which allocates places 1 to 8) or group B (places 9 to 16). Then, each team faced the other seven of its group.

In Group A, the Soviet favorites won their seven matches and became Olympic champions. The tournament was actually very close since in the last game, the Soviets were losing 2–1 against Canada after two periods to finally win 3–2; if Canada had won they would have taken the gold medal. Behind the Soviet Union, three teams had five wins and two losses: Canada, Czechoslovakia and Sweden. These three teams were ranked by goal difference with Sweden receiving silver, Czechoslovakia bronze and Canada finishing fourth. The Canadians, who were not satisfied with the method used to decide between Sweden and Czechoslovakia, boycotted the medal ceremony.

=== Luge ===
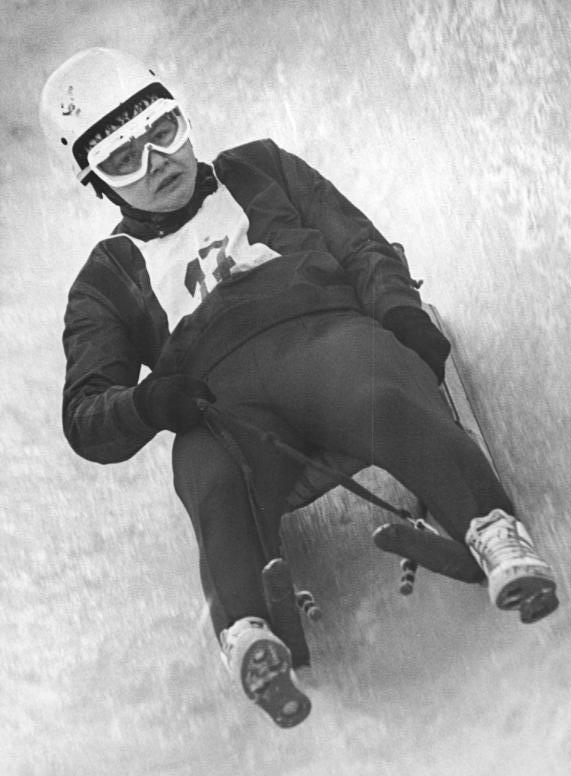
Olympic champion Ortrun Enderlein shortly after the Games.

Luge was a popular sport in the Alpine countries, the first competition of which dates back to 1831. The first international event was organized in 1928. The IOC decided in 1954 to include luge in the program of the 1964 Games to replace the skeleton, because there was only one track adapted to this sport: the Cresta Run of Saint-Moritz in Switzerland. (Note: The skeleton would only be part of the Olympic program again in 2002) Three events were contested at the Games: individual for men and women and two for men. Some commentators believed that luge was too dangerous a sport to enter the Olympic program. The death of Poland-born British luger Kazimierz Kay-Skrzypeski during a test run two weeks before the start of the Games helped reinforce this position.

The luge events were dominated by the Germans, who took five out of six medals individually. During the men's individual event, a German trio dominated the competition: the 1962 world champion Thomas Köhler as well as Klaus Bonsack and Hans Plenk were the top three in each of the first three rounds, won respectively by Köhler, Bonsack and again Köhler. Bonsack also won the fourth round. Finally, Köhler became an Olympic champion, 27 hundredths of a second ahead of Bonsack and 3.38 seconds ahead of Plenk.

The German Ilse Geisler, world champion in 1962 and 1963, was the favorite in the women's event. However, it was her compatriot Ortrun Enderlein who won the first three races. Geiser took a lot of risks in the last heat and made a big mistake, letting Enderlein win again. Enderlein became Olympic champion, almost three seconds ahead of Geisler. The Austrian Helene Thurner won the bronze medal.

The doubles event, which takes place over two rounds, was dominated by the Austrians. Indeed, Josef Feistmantl and Manfred Stengl won the first round ahead of Reinhold Senn and Helmut Thaler. The latter won the second round without worrying Feistmantl and Stengl, crowned Olympic champions. Italians Walter Ausserdorfer and Sigisfredo Mair are bronze medalists.

=== Figure skating ===
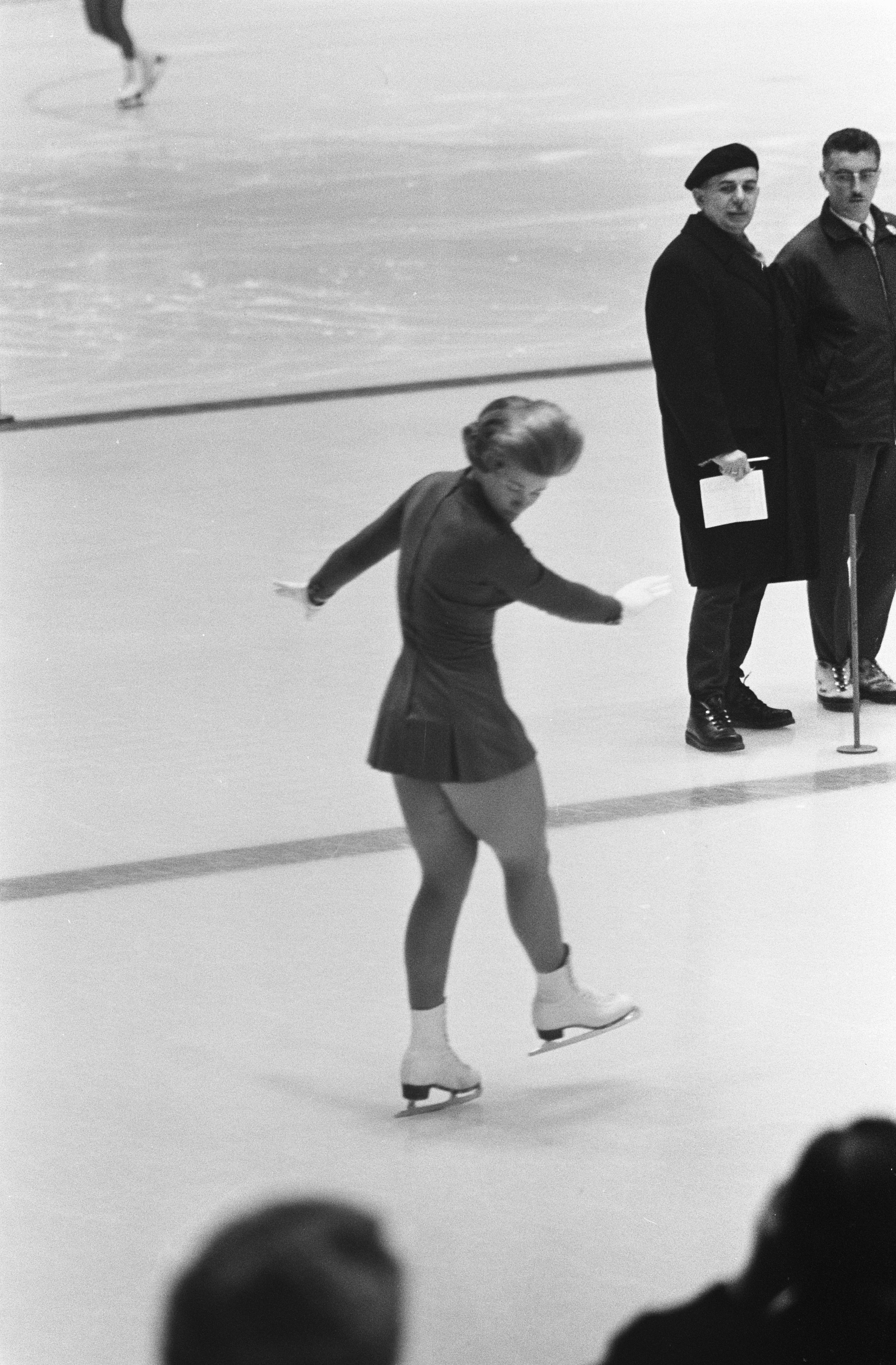
Dutch Figure Skater Sjoukje Dijkstra practicing at the 1964 Olympics

The figure skating events were held at the Olympiaeisstadion. Individually, men and women performed a free skate and compulsory figures while, for the last time in an international competition, the couples only presented one program. Computers are used for refereeing, which is new to the Olympics. The data processing system provided by the company IBM allows scores to be announced instantly. In addition to figure skating, information is sent to a data center at University of Innsbruck from eleven other facilities.

In the men's event, the German Manfred Schnelldorfer became Olympic champion by winning each round. The Frenchman Alain Calmat, slightly favored before the Olympics, finished in second place. The American Scott Allen won the bronze medal, just two days before his fifteenth birthday. He thus became the youngest medalist in the history of the Winter Games.

The big favorite in the women's event, the Dutch Sjoukje Dijkstra, easily became Olympic champion. She is in fact placed in the first row by the nine judges. In front of the Dutch royal family, she won the first Dutch gold medal at the Winter Games. The Austrian Regine Heitzer was the silver medalist with a small lead over the Canadian Petra Burka.

The Soviets Ludmila Belousova and Oleg Protopopov, a married couple, narrowly won the pair event ahead of the German Marika Kilius and Hans-Jürgen Bäumler. The bronze medals went to Canadians Debbi Wilkes and Guy Revell. In 1966, Kilius and Bäumler had to return their medals because of a professional contract signed before the Games. The Canadians received the silver medal and the Americans Vivian and Ronald Joseph, initially fourth, received the bronze medal. In 1987, however, the IOC decided to restore the medals of the German couple. The results then plunged into confusion since the different rankings did not indicate the same information. In 2013, the IOC clarified that the Soviets had the gold medal, the Canadians and the Germans shared the silver medal and the Americans the bronze medal. These were the official results since 1987.

=== Speed skating ===
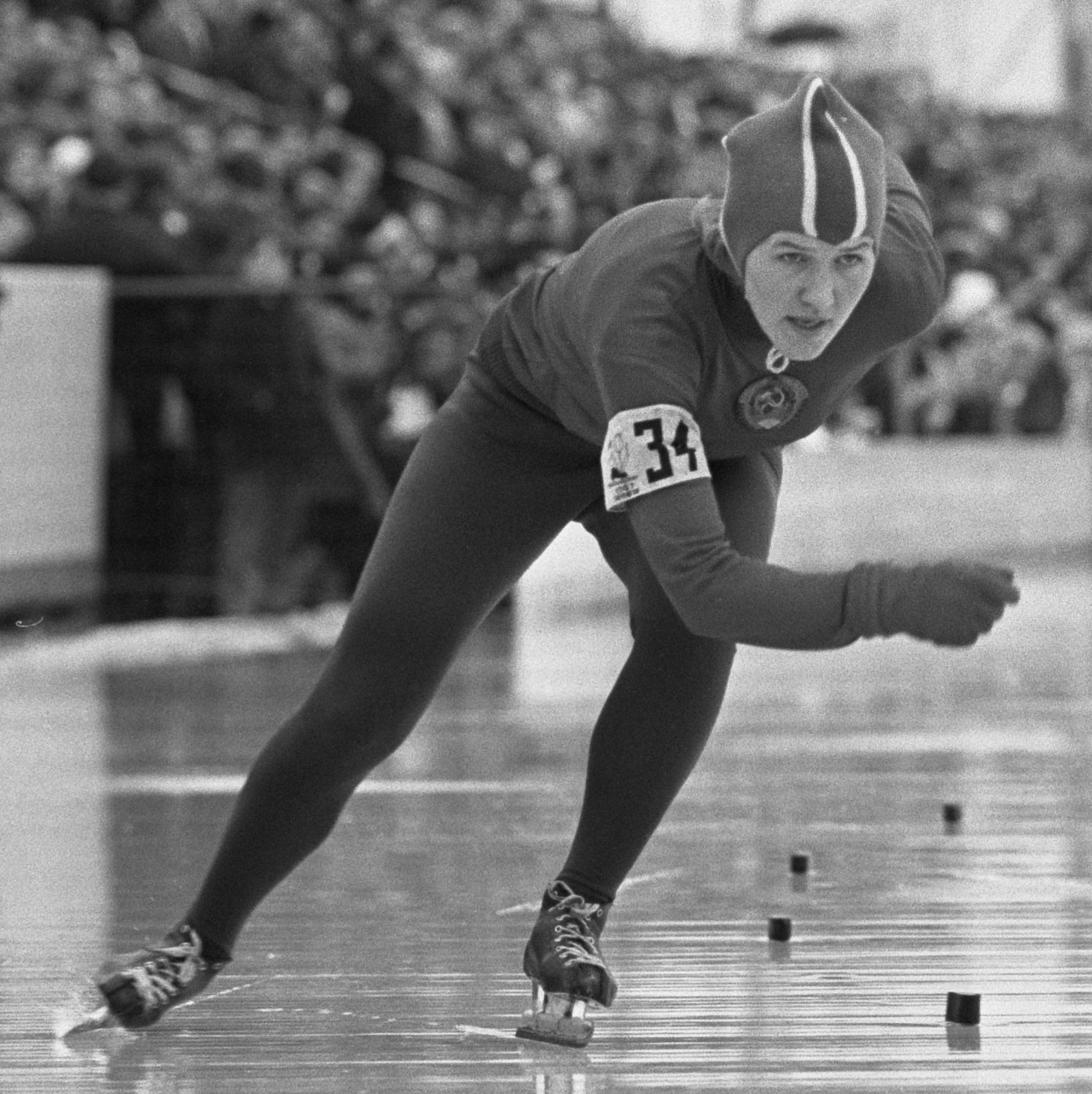
Lidia Skoblikova in 1967.

The speed skating events took place on an outdoor track set up around the Olympiaeisstadion. While the Soviets dominated the women's events, the men's podiums are more international.

The American Terry McDermott, who was not one of the favorites, won the men's 500 meters setting a new Olympic record. Taking part in his first international competition, he borrowed skates from his trainer Leo Freisinger. Three athletes, including the favorite of the event Yevgeny Grishin, shared second place. The Soviet Ants Antson won the gold medal in the 1,500 meters, ahead of the Dutch Kees Verkerk and the Norwegian Villy Haugen, after a very close race. The Norwegians score a hat-trick in the 5,000 meters. Knut Johannesen is a gold medalist beating the Olympic record just two-tenths ahead of Per Ivar Moe. Finally, the Swede Jonny Nilsson won the 10,000 meters ahead of the Norwegians Fred Anton Maier and Knut Johannesen. This race was controversial because Nilsson was one of the few to skate before the wind picked up, and enjoyed better ice than most of the other competitors.

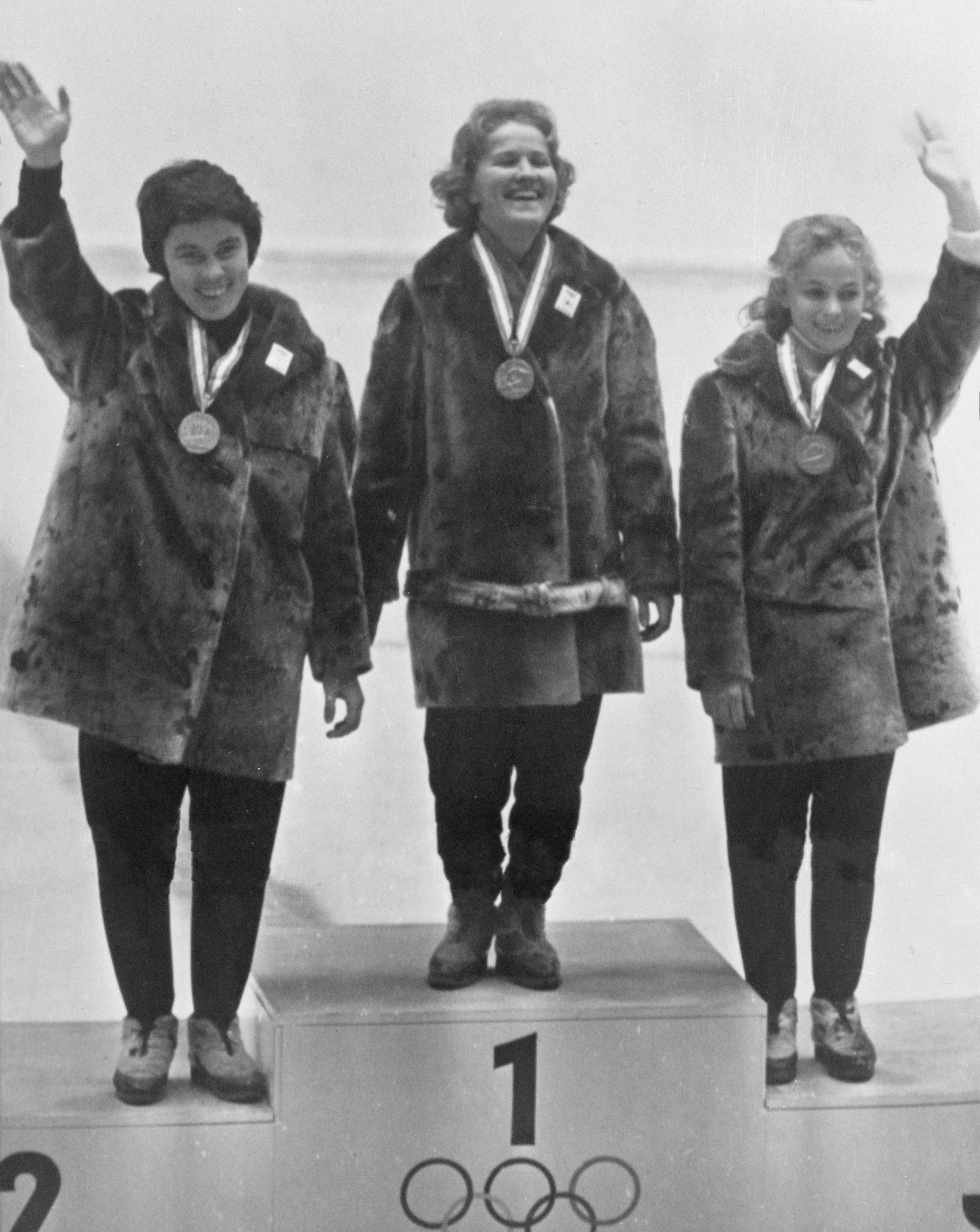
Irina Yegorova, Lidiya Skoblikova, and Kaija Mustonen on the podium during the 1964 Winter Olympics,

The Soviet Lidia Skoblikova won all four races at the 1963 world championships. A big favorite, she reproduced the same performance at the 1964 Olympic Games, breaking the Olympic record each time. She thus becomes the first athlete to win four gold medals in one edition of the Winter Games and the first, after her two titles in 1960, to accumulate six gold medals in several editions. Skoblikova first won the 500 meters ahead of her compatriots Irina Yegorova and Tatyana Sidorova. On 1,000 meters, she was ahead of Irina Iegorova and the Finn Kaija Mustonen. She dominated the 1,500 meters, with a time almost three seconds ahead of Mustonen. Finally, Skoblikova took the 5,000 meters with almost four seconds. The North Korean Han Pil-hwa, unknown before the Games, created a surprise: tied with Skoblikova halfway through the course, she was ended up tied for second with the Soviet Valentina Stenina. North Korea participated in the Games for the first time; that was the country's first Olympic medal. Upon her return home, Skoblikova was made a member of the Communist Party and became the first woman to win the title of Soviet Sportsman of the Year.

=== Ski jumping ===
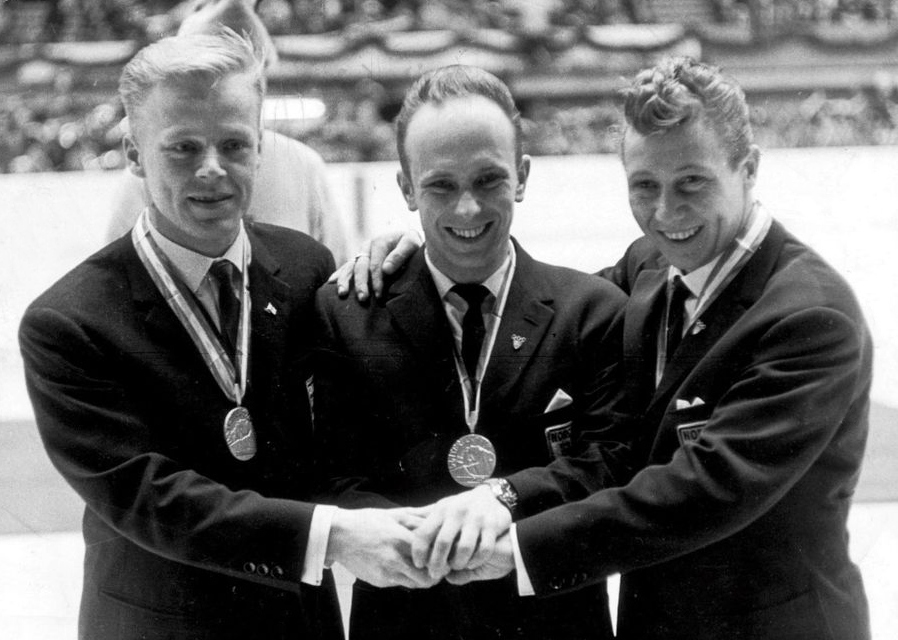
Toralf Engan, Veikko Kankkonen and Torgeir Brandtzaeg, medalists for Large hill individual at 1964 Olympics

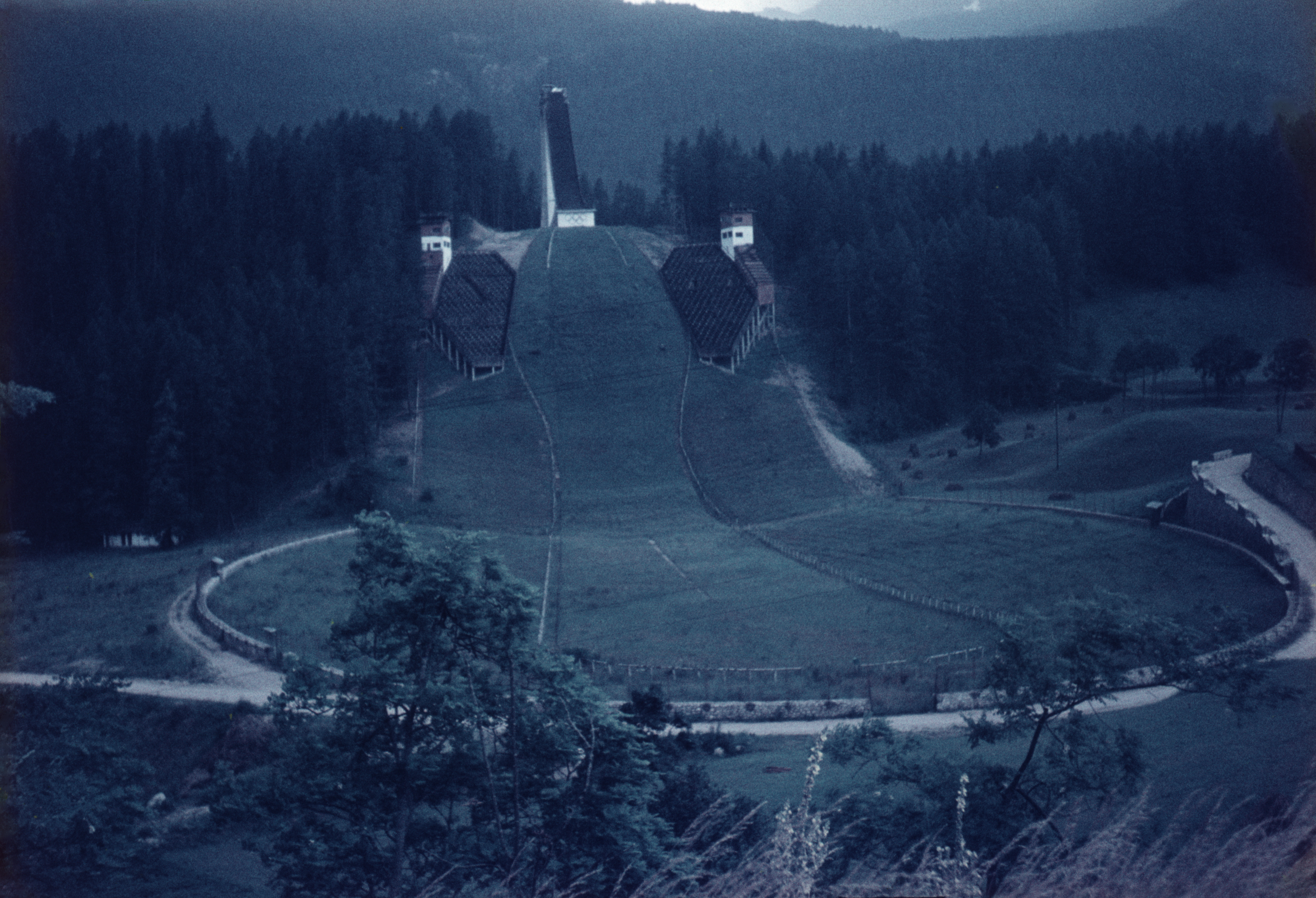
A view of the Bergisel ski jump from the 1964 Winter Olympics, Innsbruck, Austria. Image taken in June 1966

For the first time in 1964, two ski jumping events were contested at the Olympic Games: small hill, contested at Toni-Seelos-Olympiaschanze and big hill, which takes place at Bergisel Ski Jump. They have a construction point of 70 and 90 meters respectively. Athletes jump three times and their two best results count in each event.

The Czechoslovak Josef Matouš surprised many by winning the first round of the normal hill while the Finn Veikko Kankkonen, who was among the favorites, was only twenty-ninth. Kankkonen had the best jump of the competition in the second set, at 80 meters, and the Norwegian Toralf Engan took the lead. After the third round, Kankkonen who again produced a good jump, became Olympic champion. Toralf Engan was second while young Norwegian Torgeir Brandtzæg took third place. In the first round of the big hill, Veikko Kankkonen took the lead in front of Toralf Engan with a jump of 95.5 meters. Engan took the first place after the second jump, while Kankkonen and Brandtzæg followed closely behind. Brandtzæg finished with a good jump unlike his two rivals. The medalists are the same as for the normal hill, but this time Engan is Olympic champion ahead of Kankkonen.

=== Alpine skiing ===
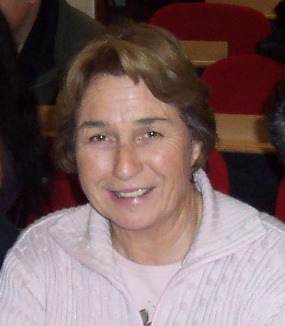
Marielle Goitschel in 2008.

Most alpine skiing events were held at Axamer Lizum, with the men's downhill being held at the Patscherkofel (above Igls). Three events were on the program for men and women: downhill, giant slalom and slalom. For the first time at the Olympics, athletes were timed to the hundredth of a second. The competition was held in mourning for the death of Australian Ross Milne, who crashed into a tree during downhill training.

Egon Zimmermann of Austria won the men's downhill, 74 hundredths of a second ahead of France's Léo Lacroix and 1.32 seconds over Wolfgang Bartels of Germany. For the last time at the Olympics, the men's giant slalom was held in a single round. The French François Bonlieu won the race ahead of the Austrian favorites: Karl Schranz was second, and Josef Stiegler was third. For the first time, the Olympic slalom had a two-round qualifying phase. The 25 best take part in the two final rounds which determine the ranking of the event. Austrian officials tried to replace Josef Stiegler with Egon Zimmermann, but Stiegler competed in the slalom under public pressure. He finally won the event. The Americans Billy Kidd and Jimmy Heuga, second and third respectively, won their country's first Olympic medals in alpine skiing.

In the women's downhill, the Austrians achieved the second treble in the history of the Winter Games in alpine skiing. The favorite Christl Haas was Olympic champion, more than a second ahead of Edith Zimmermann and Traudl Hecher. The technical events were dominated by two French women, the Goitschel sisters. Marielle Goitschel, aged 18, won the first round of the slalom ahead of her sister Christine, one year her senior. Christine was the fastest, however, in the second run. She won gold, ahead of Marielle, while the bronze medal was awarded to the American Jean Saubert. Two days later, Christine Goitschel took the lead in the giant slalom. His time was then equaled by Jean Saubert. Marielle Goitschel, the fourteenth skier to set off, was almost a second ahead of them however. The eldest Goitschel finished first this time, while her sister shared second place with Saubert.

=== Cross-country skiing ===
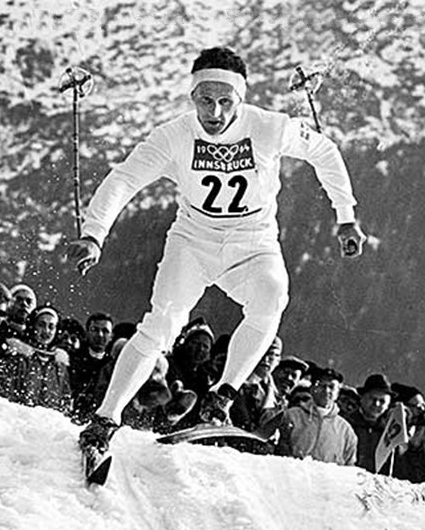
Sixten Jernberg during the 1964 Olympics.

The cross-country skiing events took place near the village of Seefeld in Tirol. The men competed as usual in individual over 15, 30 and 50 kilometer as well as in the 4 × 10 kilometer relay. On the other hand, women competed for the first time at the Olympic Games the 5 kilometer, introduced at the world championships in 1962, in addition to the 10 kilometer and the relay 3 × 5 kilometer.

Men's events started with the 30 kilometers. The Finn Eero Mäntyranta won the race ahead of the Norwegian Harald Grønningen and the Soviet Igor Voronchikhin. The Swede Sixten Jernberg, the favorite after his six Olympic medals obtained in 1956 and 1960, finished fifth. Eight of the top nine athletes were Scandinavian. In the 15 kilometer skied three days later, Eero Mäntyranta was once again crowned Olympic champion ahead of Harald Grønningen. Sixten Jernberg wins bronze, his seventh Olympic medal. Racing the day before his 35th birthday, Jernberg took the lead at the end of the 50 kilometer. He won gold, his eighth Olympic medal, finishing more than a minute ahead of his compatriot Assar Rönnlund. The end of the relay 4 × 10 kilometer was a duel between the Finnish Eero Mäntyranta and the Swede Assar Rönnlund, who overtook the Soviet Pavel Kolchin one kilometer from the finish. Sweden eventually won the event, eight seconds ahead of Finland and twelve over the Soviet Union. Jernberg ended his Olympic career with nine medals including four gold, which was a new record.

Soviet skiers dominated the women's events as they won six of the seven possible medals. In the 10 kilometer they achieved the treble as in 1960: Klavdiya Boyarskikh ahead Yevdokiya Mekshilo and Maria Gusakova. For the first time among women, non-European cross-country skiers took part in the Olympic Games. The two North Koreans and the two Mongols, however, finished in the last four places. Boyarskikh also won the very close Olympic 5 km, while Finland's Mirja Lehtonen surprised by taking second place. The Soviet Alevtina Kolchina was third. Finally, the Soviets won the relay 3 × 5 kilometer for the first time. They were well ahead of the Swedes by two minutes and the Finns by three. Klavdiya Boyarskikh wins his third gold medal at these Games.

== Closing ceremony ==
For the first time in games history, the closing ceremony was not held at the Olympic Stadium and in an indoor place, took place on February 9 at the Olympiaeisstadion. The flags of Greece, the founding nation of the Olympic Games, Austria, the host country, and France, the host country of the next Games, were raised to the sound of the national anthems. The president of the IOC Avery Brundage officially declared the Games closed before the extinction of the Olympic flame.

== Games highlights ==
- The games were opened by a concert performed by Vienna Philharmonic, under the baton of Karl Böhm. Beethoven's 7th Symphony and Mozart's 40th Symphony were performed in the opening concert.
- Normally snowy, Innsbruck was threatened by a lack of snow. The Austrian army carved out 20,000 ice bricks from a mountain top and transported them to the bobsled and luge runs. They also carried 40,000 cubic meters of snow to the Alpine skiing courses. The army packed down the slopes by hand and foot. (A heavy snowfall occurred immediately after the Games.)
- Lidia Skoblikova won all of the women's speed skating events.
- Italian bobsleigh pilot Eugenio Monti distinguished himself by helping Britain's Tony Nash and Robin Dixon to win the gold medals when he loaned them an axle bolt to replace one that was broken. The Italians took bronze, but Monti was honored as the first recipient of the International Fair Play Committee's Pierre de Coubertin World Trophy for sportsmanship.
- Egon Zimmermann of Austria took the gold medal in the men's downhill alpine skiing event.
- In the 4-man bobsled, the Canadian team won the gold medal with a total winning time of 4:14.46.
- Norway's Knut Johannesen won the men's 5,000 m speed skating event in an Olympic record time of 7:38.40.
- Klavdiya Boyarskikh of the USSR earned three gold medals in cross-country skiing and, on the men's side, Finnish Eero Mäntyranta won two and earned the nickname "Mr. Seefeld" after the venue because of his domination.
- In alpine skiing, French sisters Christine and Marielle Goitschel finished first and second in both the slalom and the giant slalom.
- Ski jumping gained a second event, and the sport of luge made its Olympic debut.
- Politically, the Games were notable because East and West Germany entered a combined team for the last time.
- For the first time the closing ceremonies were held at a different place than the opening ceremonies. This also the first time that Olympic ceremonies are held in an indoor venue.

== Medals ==
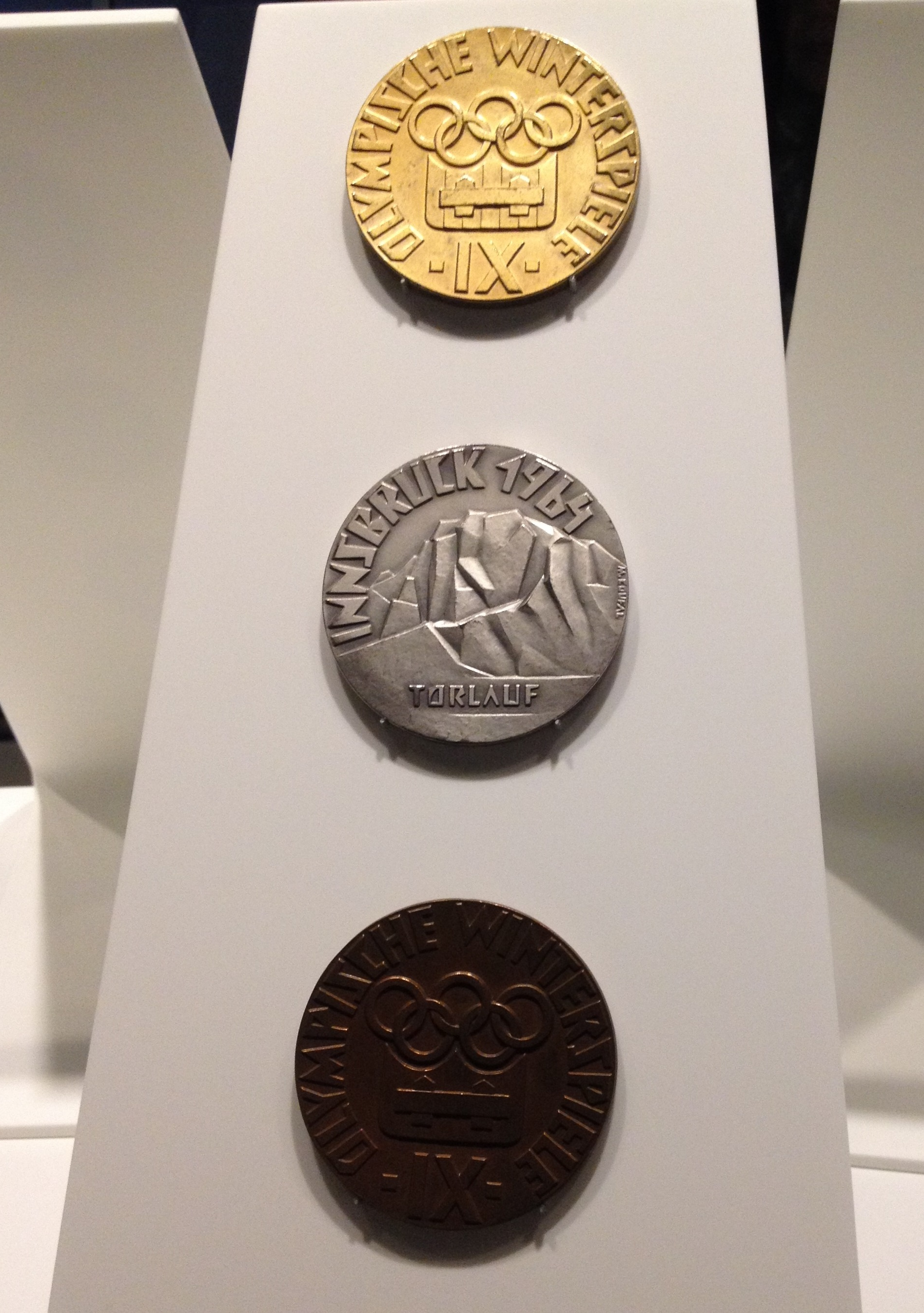
The medals of the Innsbruck Games.

Fourteen of the thirty-six nations which participated in these Games won at least one medal, as detailed in the table below. Already first in 1956 and 1960, the Soviet Union came far ahead of this table with twenty-five medals: eleven gold, eight silver and six bronze, a new record for both gold and total medals won at a single Winter Olympics. The host country, ninth four years earlier, was second with twelve medals, including seven in alpine skiing. Norway, fourth in 1964, came third with fifteen medals.

=== Most decorated athletes ===
The Soviets also dominated the ranking of the most medal-winning athletes as the speed skater Lidia Skoblikova and cross-country skier Klavdiya Boyarskikh came first and second.

=== Medal count ===
These are the top ten nations that won medals at these Games:

* Host nation (Austria)

Rank	Nation	Gold	Silver	Bronze	Total
1	Soviet Union	11	8	6	25
2	Austria*	4	5	3	12
3	Norway	3	6	6	15
4	Finland	3	4	3	10
5	France	3	4	0	7
6	United Team of Germany	3	3	3	9
7	Sweden	3	3	1	7
8	United States	1	2	4	7
9	Canada	1	1	1	3
10	Netherlands	1	1	0	2
Totals (10 entries)		33	37	27	97

==== Podium sweeps ====
Date	Sport	Event	NOC	Gold	Silver	Bronze
30 January	Speed skating	Women's 500 metres	Soviet Union	Lidiya Skoblikova	Irina Yegorova	Tatyana Sidorova
1 February	Cross-country skiing	Women's 10 kilometre	Soviet Union	Klavdiya Boyarskikh	Yevdokiya Mekshilo	Mariya Gusakova
4 February	Luge	Men's singles	United Team of Germany	Thomas Köhler	Klaus-Michael Bonsack	Hans Plenk
5 February	Speed skating	Men's 5000 metres	Norway	Knut Johannesen	Per Ivar Moe	Fred Anton Maier
6 February	Alpine skiing	Women's downhill	Austria	Christl Haas	Edith Zimmermann	Traudl Hecher

== Venues ==
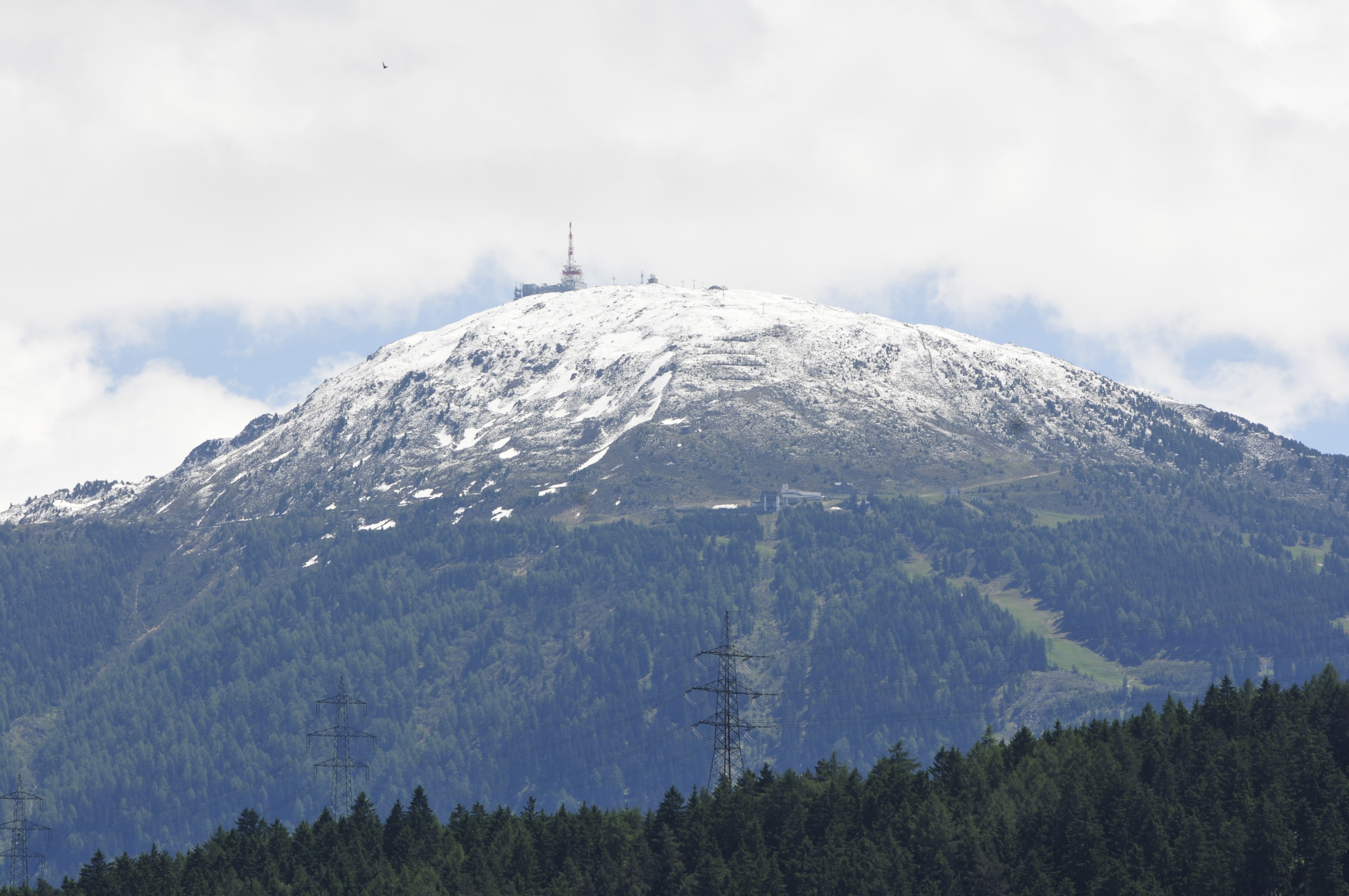
The men's descent takes place on the slopes of the Patscherkofel.

Several sports venues were built especially for the Games. New slopes for alpine skiing were developed near the village of Axamer Lizum, about twenty kilometers from Innsbruck. There is a bobsleigh and luge track in Igls, seven kilometers south of Innsbruck. The runway, 1506 meters long, had 14 curves and a drop of 138 meters. For the first time at the Games, the bobsleigh track used artificial ice. The Olympiaeisstadion, an eleven thousand-seat ice rink completed in 1963 and located in the center of Innsbruck, hosted the competitions of figure skating and most games of ice hockey. The other hockey matches were played at the Messehalle. The speed skating ring, made of artificial ice, was installed outside the Olympiaeisstadion.

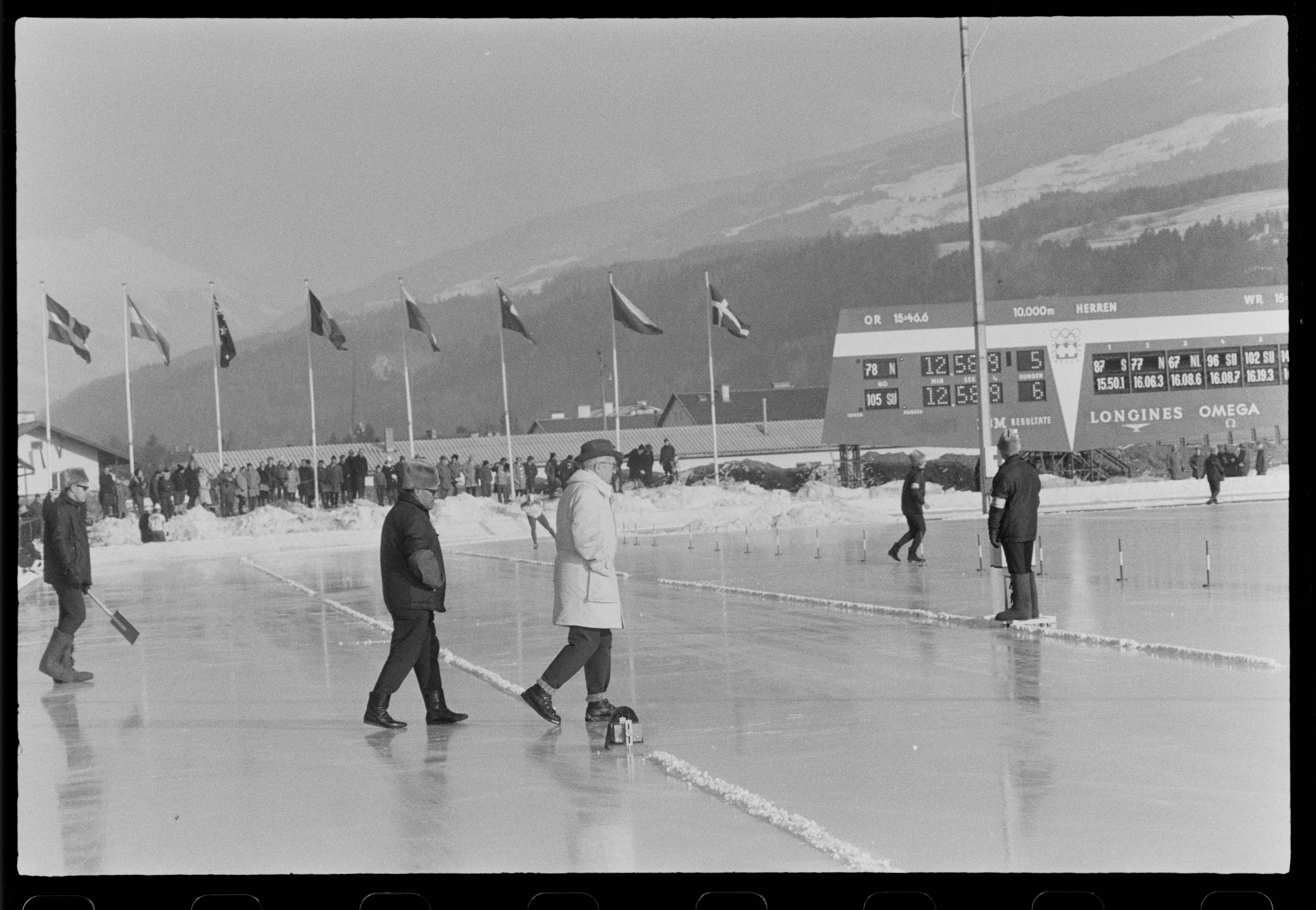
Eisschnellaufbahn

The ski jumping events were held on the Toni-Seelos-Olympiaschanze (normal hill) at Seefeld in Tirol and the Bergisel Ski Jump (big jump) in Innsbruck. The Bergisel ski jump, built in wood in 1920, was replaced by a concrete ski jump. The cross-country skiing and biathlon tracks were located in Seefeld, like the small hill. The opening ceremony was celebrated at the foot of the Bergisel ski jump while the closing ceremony took place at the Olympiaeisstadion. An Olympic Village consisting of eight eleven-storey buildings was built outside the city.

- Axamer Lizum – Alpine skiing (except the men's downhill)
- Bergiselschanze – opening ceremonies and ski jumping (large hill)
- Bob und Rodelbahn Igls – bobsleigh, luge
- Eisschnellaufbahn – speed skating
- Messehalle – ice hockey
- Olympiahalle – closing ceremonies, figure skating, ice hockey
- Patscherkofel – Alpine skiing (men's downhill)
- Seefeld – biathlon, cross-county skiing, Nordic combined, ski jumping (normal hill)

== Participating nations ==
A total of 36 nations sent athletes to Innsbruck, six more than in Squaw Valley in 1960. The total number of athletes was 1,091, up from 665 four years earlier. Mongolia, India and North Korea participated in the Winter Games for the first time. Belgium, Greece, Iran, Romania and Yugoslavia returned to this competition after missing it in 1960. On the other hand, South Africa and New Zealand, which took part in Squaw Valley, did not compete in Innsbruck. Athletes from West Germany (FRG) and East Germany (GDR) competed together as Unified Team Germany from 1956 to 1964.

The number indicated in brackets is the number of athletes entered in the official events for each country.

Participating National Olympic Committees
- Argentina (12)
- Australia (6)
- Austria (83) (host)
- Belgium (8)
- Bulgaria (7)
- Canada (55)
- Chile (5)
- Czechoslovakia (46)
- Denmark (2)
- Finland (52)
- France (24)
- Great Britain (36)
- Greece (3)
- Hungary (28)
- Iceland (5)
- India (1)
- Iran (4)
- Italy (61)
- Japan (47)
- Lebanon (4)
- Liechtenstein (6)
- Mongolia (13)
- Netherlands (6)
- North Korea (13)
- Norway (58)
- Poland (51)
- Romania (27)
- South Korea (7)
- Soviet Union (69)
- Spain (6)
- Sweden (57)
- Switzerland (72)
- Turkey (5)
- United States (89)
- United Team of Germany (96)
- Yugoslavia (31)

=== Number of athletes by National Olympic Committees ===
IOC Letter Code	Country	Athletes
EUA	United Team of Germany	96
USA	United States	89
AUT	Austria	83
SUI	Switzerland	72
URS	Soviet Union	69
ITA	Italy	61
NOR	Norway	58
SWE	Sweden	57
CAN	Canada	55
FIN	Finland	52
POL	Poland	51
JPN	Japan	47
TCH	Czechoslovakia	46
GBI	Great Britain	36
YUG	Yugoslavia	31
HUN	Hungary	28
ROM	Romania	27
FRA	France	24
NKO	North Korea	13
MGL	Mongolia	13
ARG	Argentina	12
BEL	Belgium	8
BUL	Bulgaria	7
KOR	South Korea	7
AUS	Australia	6
LIE	Liechtenstein	6
NED	Netherlands	6
SPA	Spain	6
CHI	Chile	5
ISL	Iceland	5
TUR	Turkey	5
IRN	Iran	4
LIB	Lebanon	4
GRE	Greece	3
DEN	Denmark	2
IND	India	1
Total		1091

== Prior fatalities ==
Two fatal events before the 1964 Winter Olympics affected the outcome and mood of the Games:

- Australian alpine skier Ross Milne and British luge slider Kazimierz "Kay" Skrzypecki died during training shortly before the Games. The organizing committee said that Ross crashed into a tree during a training run. The IOC suggested that inexperience might have played a role in Ross's death. Manager John Wagner suggested that overcrowding played a role, saying that Milne had tried to slow down "on a spot which was not prepared for stopping or swinging" to avoid a crowd of contestants. His brother Malcolm Milne competed at the 1968 and 1972 Winter Olympics.
- On February 15, 1961, the entire United States figure skating team and several family members, coaches, and officials were killed when Sabena Flight 548 crashed in Brussels, Belgium, en route to the World Championships in Prague. The accident caused the cancellation of the 1961 World Championships and necessitated the building of a new American skating program. Although American figure skaters were still too young in 1964 (most were aged 15 or lower), they still managed to win two medals.

There were also several injuries which occurred prior to the event.

- Liechtenstein Alpine skiers Wolfgang Ender broke his leg and Edmund Schaedler fractured his arm in a crash close to the same location as Australian Milne, only a few minutes after the fatality occurred.
- German tobogganer Josef Fleischmann crashed during practices.

== After the Games ==
=== After the Games ===
In the 1970s, the American city of Denver, chosen to host the 1976 Winter Olympics, rejected the bid after a statewide referendum. About ten cities applied to take over the Games and Innsbruck was selected. The main reasons for this choice were the venues built for the 1964 Games, which kept costs down, and their good organization during the 1964 Olympics. The Olympic venues subsequently hosted various sports competitions such as the Four Hills Tournament, Bobsleigh and Luge World Cup events, the Winter Universiade and the Ice Hockey World Championship in 2005 and the first Winter Youth Olympic Games in 2012.

== See also ==
- 1964 Summer Paralympics
- 1964 Summer Olympics
- Olympic Games held in Austria
  - 1964 Winter Olympics – Innsbruck
  - 1976 Winter Olympics – Innsbruck
  - 2012 Winter Youth Olympics – Innsbruck
- List of IOC country codes

== Notes ==
Notes

Citations

=== Bibliography ===
- Adams, Carly (2004). "Innsbruck 1964". In Findling, John E.; Pelle, Kimberly D. (eds.). Encyclopedia of the modern Olympic movement. Westport, Conn.: Greenwood Press. ISBN 0-313-32278-3.
- Espy, Richard (1981). The politics of the Olympic Games, with an epilogue, 1976–1980. Berkeley, USA: University Press. ISBN 978-0-520-04395-4.
- Mogore, Christian (1989). La grande histoire des Jeux olympiques d'hiver (in French). Chambéry (France): Agraf. ISBN 2-908240-01-7.
- Monnin, Éric (2010). De Chamonix à Vancouver: Un siècle d'olympisme en hiver (in French). Méolans-Revel: éditions DésIris. ISBN 978-2-915418-38-5.
- Valle, Stéphanet (1988). Les Jeux olympiques d'hiver (in French). Lyon (France): La Manufacture. ISBN 2-7377-0057-4.
- Wallechinsky, David (2001). The complete book of the Winter Olympics (2002 ed.). Woodstock, N.Y.: Overlook Press. ISBN 1-58567-195-9.
- Wolfgang, Friedl; Neumann, Bertl, eds. (1967). Offizieller Bericht der IX. Olympischen Winterspiele Innsbruck 1964 [Official Report of the 1964 Olympic Winter Games] (in German). Vienna: Herausgegeben vom Organisationskomitee.

Winter Olympics
Preceded by Squaw Valley	IX Olympic Winter Games; Innsbruck; 1964	Succeeded by Grenoble
