= Speed skating at the 1964 Winter Olympics – Men's 5000 metres =

Speed skating at the Olympics

Men's 5000 metres speed skating at the IX Olympic Winter Games
- Pictogram for speed skating
- Venue: Eisschnelllaufbahn Innsbruck
- Date: 5 February 1964
- Competitors: 42 from 19 nations
- Winning time: 7:38.4 OR

Medalists
1st place, gold medalist(s)		Knut Johannesen	Norway
2nd place, silver medalist(s)		Per Ivar Moe	Norway
3rd place, bronze medalist(s)		Fred Anton Maier	Norway

The men's 5000 metres in speed skating at the 1964 Winter Olympics took place on 5 February, at the Eisschnellaufbahn.

== Records ==
Prior to this competition, the existing world and Olympic records were as follows:

World record	Jonny Nilsson (SWE)	7:34.3	Karuizawa, Japan	23 February 1963
Olympic record	Boris Shilkov (URS)	7:48.7	Cortina d'Ampezzo, Italy	29 January 1956

The following new Olympic record was set.

Date	Athlete	Time	OR	WR
5 February	Knut Johannesen (NOR)	7:38.4	OR	

== Results ==
Rank	Athlete	Country	Time	Notes
1st place, gold medalist(s)	Knut Johannesen	Norway	7:38.4	OR
2nd place, silver medalist(s)	Per Ivar Moe	Norway	7:38.6	
3rd place, bronze medalist(s)	Fred Anton Maier	Norway	7:42.0	
4	Viktor Kosichkin	Soviet Union	7:45.8	
5	Hermann Strutz	Austria	7:48.3	
6	Jonny Nilsson	Sweden	7:48.4	
7	Ivar Nilsson	Sweden	7:49.0	
8	Rudi Liebrechts	Netherlands	7:50.9	
9	Kees Verkerk	Netherlands	7:51.1	
10	Muzakhid Khabibulin	Soviet Union	7:52.3	
11	Günter Traub	United Team of Germany	7:53.9	
12	Kurt Stille	Denmark	7:56.1	
13	Gerd Zimmermann	United Team of Germany	7:56.8	
14	Renato De Riva	Italy	7:57.5	
15	Kalervo Hietala	Finland	7:58.8	
16	Terry Malkin	Great Britain	7:59.4	
17	Choi Yeong-Bae	South Korea	8:03.4	
18	Jouko Launonen	Finland	8:03.5	
19	Örjan Sandler	Sweden	8:05.3	
20	Dick Hunt	United States	8:09.7	
21	Toivo Salonen	Finland	8:10.2	
22	Tony Bullen	Great Britain	8:12.4	
23	Satoshi Shinpo	Japan	8:12.5	
24	Toyofumi Aruga	Japan	8:15.9	
25	Ralf Olin	Canada	8:18.2	
26	György Ivánkai	Hungary	8:19.4	
26	Yoshihiro Kawano	Japan	8:19.4	
28	Bak Sung-wun	North Korea	8:20.2	
29	Wayne LeBombard	United States	8:21.3	
30	Kim Choon-bong	North Korea	8:22.9	
31	Luvsansharavyn Tsend	Mongolia	8:23.9	
32	Ruedi Uster	Switzerland	8:24.8	
33	Oldřich Teplý	Czechoslovakia	8:25.6	
34	Peter Nottet	Netherlands	8:26.1	
35	Gerald Koning	Canada	8:26.9	
36	Choi Nam-Yeon	South Korea	8:28.0	
37	Reinhold Seeböck	Austria	8:29.6	
38	Stan Fail	United States	8:31.9	
39	Jürgen Schmidt	United Team of Germany	8:36.6	
40	Peter Büttner	Switzerland	8:45.5	
41	Mihály Martos	Hungary	8:47.1	
42	Gerhard Strutz	Austria	8:50.4	
