= Cross-country skiing at the 1964 Winter Olympics – Men's 30 kilometre =

Olympic cross-country skiing event

Men's 30km at the IX Olympic Winter Games
- Cross-country skiing
- Venue: Cross Country Skiing Stadium
- Date: 30 January 1964
- Competitors: 69 from 23 nations
- Winning time: 1-30:50.7

Medalists
1st place, gold medalist(s)		Eero Mäntyranta	Finland
2nd place, silver medalist(s)		Harald Grønningen	Norway
3rd place, bronze medalist(s)		Igor Voronchikhin	Soviet Union

The Men's 30 kilometre cross-country skiing event was part of the cross-country skiing programme at the 1964 Winter Olympics, in Innsbruck, Austria. The competition was held on 30 January 1964, at the Cross Country Skiing Stadium.

== Results ==
Rank	Name	Country	Time
1	Eero Mäntyranta	Finland	1-30:50.7
2	Harald Grønningen	Norway	1-32:02.3
3	Igor Voronchikhin	Soviet Union	1-32:15.8
4	Janne Stefansson	Sweden	1-32:34.8
5	Sixten Jernberg	Sweden	1-32:39.6
6	Kalevi Laurila	Finland	1-32:41.4
7	Assar Rönnlund	Sweden	1-32:43.6
8	Einar Østby	Norway	1-32:54.6
9	Torsten Samuelsson	Sweden	1-33:07.8
10	Walter Demel	United Team of Germany	1-33:10.2
11	Sverre Stensheim	Norway	1-33:12.3
12	Bayazit Gizatullin	Soviet Union	1-33:33.4
13	Arto Tiainen	Finland	1-33:37.7
14	Väinö Huhtala	Finland	1-33:38.1
15	Marcello De Dorigo	Italy	1-33:53.4
16	Giuseppe Steiner	Italy	1-33:59.8
17	Ivan Utrobin	Soviet Union	1-34:10.4
18	Franco Stella	Italy	1-35:01.1
19	Gennady Vaganov	Soviet Union	1-35:03.1
20	Victor Arbez	France	1-36:50.5
21	Roger Pires	France	1-37:45.5
22	Livio Stuffer	Italy	1-38:11.0
23	Félix Mathieu	France	1-38:24.5
24	Józef Rysula	Poland	1-38:29.1
25	Claude Legrand	France	1-38:40.5
26	Štefan Harvan	Czechoslovakia	1-39:05.2
27	Konrad Hischier	Switzerland	1-39:43.6
28	Hans Ammann	Switzerland	1-39:55.7
29	Heinz Seidel	United Team of Germany	1-40:01.0
30	Mike Elliott	United States	1-40:11.7
31	Andreas Janc	Austria	1-40:23.3
32	Rudolf Dannhauer	United Team of Germany	1-40:35.7
33	Ladislav Hrubý	Czechoslovakia	1-41:04.8
34	Alfons Dorner	United Team of Germany	1-41:09.5
35	Edward Budny	Poland	1-41:31.9
36	Hansjörg Farbmacher	Austria	1-41:37.1
37	Stefan Mitkov	Bulgaria	1-42:13.2
38	Donald MacLeod	Canada	1-42:17.7
39	Georges Dubois	Switzerland	1-42:26.8
40	Tadeusz Jankowski	Poland	1-42:34.0
41	Kazuo Sato	Japan	1-42:39.2
42	Dick Taylor	United States	1-42:39.5
43	Alphonse Baume	Switzerland	1-42:41.8
44	Cveto Pavčič	Yugoslavia	1-42:44.0
45	Roman Seljak	Yugoslavia	1-42:44.4
46	Larry Damon	United States	1-42:57.7
47	Hidezo Takahashi	Japan	1-43:11.0
48	Jim Shea	United States	1-43:18.4
49	Borislav Ochushki	Bulgaria	1-44:00.1
50	Janko Kobentar	Yugoslavia	1-45:04.7
51	Tatsuo Kitamura	Japan	1-46:13.4
52	Martti Rautio	Canada	1-46:18.6
53	Svend Carlsen	Denmark	1-46:35.9
54	Gheorghe Bădescu	Romania	1-46:54.5
55	Roderick Tuck	Great Britain	1-47:52.6
56	Hermann Mayr	Austria	1-48:53.3
57	Sodnomtserengiin Natsagdorj	Mongolia	1-49:07.1
58	Bizyaagiin Dashgai	Mongolia	1-49:24.7
59	Banzragchiin Zundui	Mongolia	1-49:27.3
60	Bayanjavyn Damdinjav	Mongolia	1-51:25.2
61	Þórhallur Sveinsson	Iceland	1-51:34.4
62	Chogoro Yahata	Japan	1-51:45.3
63	Yang Duk-soon	North Korea	1-53:58.4
64	Birgir Guðlaugsson	Iceland	1-54:00.3
65	Kim Ko-am	North Korea	1-55:11.0
66	Yang Yong-ok	South Korea	2-28:54.7
AC	Henryk Marek	Poland	DQ
AC	Ole Ellefsæter	Norway	DQ
AC	Franz Vetter	Austria	DNF
