= Cross-country skiing at the 1964 Winter Olympics – Women's 10 kilometre =

Cross-country skiing at the Olympics

Women's 10km at the IX Olympic Winter Games
- Cross-country skiing
- Venue: Cross Country Skiing Stadium
- Date: 1 February 1964
- Competitors: 35 from 12 nations
- Winning time: 40:24.3

Medalists
1st place, gold medalist(s)		Klavdiya Boyarskikh	Soviet Union
2nd place, silver medalist(s)		Yevdokiya Mekshilo	Soviet Union
3rd place, bronze medalist(s)		Mariya Gusakova	Soviet Union

The Women's 10 kilometre cross-country skiing event was part of the cross-country skiing programme at the 1964 Winter Olympics, in Innsbruck, Austria. It was the fourth appearance of the event. The competition was held on 1 February 1964, at the Cross Country Skiing Stadium.

== Results ==
Rank	Name	Country	Time
1	Klavdiya Boyarskikh	Soviet Union	40:24.3
2	Yevdokiya Mekshilo	Soviet Union	40:26.5
3	Mariya Gusakova	Soviet Union	40:46.6
4	Britt Strandberg	Sweden	40:54.0
5	Toini Pöysti	Finland	41:17.4
6	Senja Pusula	Finland	41:17.8
7	Alevtina Kolchina	Soviet Union	41:26.2
8	Toini Gustafsson	Sweden	41:41.1
9	Eeva Ruoppa	Finland	41:58.1
10	Mirja Lehtonen	Finland	42:06.9
11	Barbro Martinsson	Sweden	42:36.1
12	Ingrid Wigernæs	Norway	43:38.0
13	Christine Nestler	United Team of Germany	43:38.2
14	Renate Dannhauer-Borges	United Team of Germany	43:52.7
15	Rita Czech-Blasl	United Team of Germany	44:07.8
16	Elfriede Spiegelhauer-Uhlig	United Team of Germany	44:08.8
17	Gun Ädel	Sweden	44:18.9
18	Stefania Biegun	Poland	44:45.0
19	Éva Balázs	Hungary	46:04.7
20	Nadezhda Vasileva	Bulgaria	46:10.8
21	Eva Paulusová-Benešová	Czechoslovakia	46:31.2
22	Roza Dimova	Bulgaria	46:53.1
23	Czesława Stopka	Poland	46:57.1
24	Teresa Trzebunia	Poland	47:20.3
25	Heiderun Ludwig	Austria	47:27.6
26	Krastana Stoeva	Bulgaria	47:39.2
27	Jarmila Škodová	Czechoslovakia	47:40.3
28	Nadezhda Mikhaylova	Bulgaria	47:45.2
29	Eva Břízová	Czechoslovakia	47:56.0
30	Mária Tarnai	Hungary	48:18.9
31	Babben Enger-Damon	Norway	48:43.8
32	Kim Bong-za	North Korea	52:18.6
33	Ri Han-soon	North Korea	53:21.8
34	Jigjeegiin Javzandulam	Mongolia	54:47.6
35	Dorjgotovyn Pürevloov	Mongolia	55:03.6
