= Speed skating at the 1964 Winter Olympics – Men's 10,000 metres =

Speed skating at the Olympics

Men's 10,000 metres speed skating at the IX Olympic Winter Games
- Pictogram for speed skating
- Venue: Eisschnelllaufbahn Innsbruck
- Date: 7 February 1964
- Competitors: 33 from 19 nations
- Winning time: 15:50.1

Medalists
1st place, gold medalist(s)		Jonny Nilsson; Sweden
2nd place, silver medalist(s)		Fred Anton Maier; Norway
3rd place, bronze medalist(s)		Knut Johannesen; Norway

The men's 10,000 metres in speed skating at the 1964 Winter Olympics took place on 7 February, at the Eisschnellaufbahn.

== Records ==
Prior to this competition, the existing world and Olympic records were as follows:

World record	Jonny Nilsson (SWE)	15:33.0	Karuizawa, Japan	24 February 1963
Olympic record	Knut Johannesen (NOR)	15:46.6	Squaw Valley, United States	27 February 1960

== Results ==
Rank	Athlete	Country	Time
1st place, gold medalist(s)	Jonny Nilsson	Sweden	15:50.1
2nd place, silver medalist(s)	Fred Anton Maier	Norway	16:06.0
3rd place, bronze medalist(s)	Knut Johannesen	Norway	16:06.3
4	Rudi Liebrechts	Netherlands	16:08.6
5	Ants Antson	Soviet Union	16:08.7
6	Viktor Kosichkin	Soviet Union	16:19.3
7	Gerd Zimmermann	United Team of Germany	16:22.5
8	Terry Malkin	Great Britain	16:35.2
9	Kurt Stille	Denmark	16:38.3
10	Ivar Nilsson	Sweden	16:40.3
11	Hermann Strutz	Austria	16:42.6
12	Igor Ostashov	Soviet Union	16:45.5
13	Per Ivar Moe	Norway	16:47.1
14	Jouko Launonen	Finland	16:49.8
15	Ralf Olin	Canada	16:53.3
16	Kees Verkerk	Netherlands	16:53.4
17	Örjan Sandler	Sweden	16:56.9
18	Renato De Riva	Italy	16:57.5
19	Günter Traub	United Team of Germany	16:58.4
20	Juhani Järvinen	Finland	17:05.0
21	Jürgen Traub	United Team of Germany	17:08.9
22	Toyofumi Aruga	Japan	17:09.9
23	Kim Choon-Bong	North Korea	17:10.8
24	Satoshi Shinpo	Japan	17:11.3
25	Luvsansharavyn Tsend	Mongolia	17:12.4
26	Kalervo Hietala	Finland	17:12.9
27	André Kouprianoff	France	17:17.4
28	Tony Bullen	Great Britain	17:19.8
29	Ruedi Uster	Switzerland	17:23.4
30	Wayne LeBombard	United States	17:30.6
31	Choi Yeong-Bae	South Korea	17:31.3
32	Yoshihiro Kawano	Japan	17:39.0
33	György Ivánkai	Hungary	17:47.3
