= Czechoslovakia at the 1964 Winter Olympics =

- IOC code: TCH
- NOC: Czechoslovak Olympic Committee

in Innsbruck
- Competitors: 46 (36 men, 10 women) in 8 sports
- Flag bearer: Josef Matouš (ski jumping)
- Medals Ranked 13th: Gold 0 Silver 0 Bronze 1 Total 1

Winter Olympics appearances (overview)
- 1924; 1928; 1932; 1936; 1948; 1952; 1956; 1960; 1964; 1968; 1972; 1976; 1980; 1984; 1988; 1992

Other related appearances
- Czech Republic (1994–pres.); Slovakia (1994–pres.)

Czechoslovakia competed at the 1964 Winter Olympics in Innsbruck, Austria.

== Medalists ==
Medal	Name	Sport	Event	Date
Bronze	Czechoslovakia men's national ice hockey team: Vladimír Dzurilla; Vladimír Nadrchal; Rudolf Potsch; František Tikal; František Gregor; Stanislav Sventek; Ladislav Šmíd; Vlastimil Bubník; Jaroslav Walter; Miroslav Vlach; Jiří Dolana; Jiří Holík; Josef Černý; Stanislav Prýl; Jozef Golonka; Jaroslav Jiřík; Jan Klapáč	Ice hockey	Men's competition	9 February

== Alpine skiing ==
Men

Athlete	Event	Race	
Athlete	Event	Time	Rank
Radim Koloušek	Downhill	2:31.34	39
Radim Koloušek	Giant Slalom	2:14.70	55
Anton Šoltýs	Giant Slalom	2:10.79	48

Men's slalom

Athlete	Qualifying				Final					
Athlete	Time 1	Rank	Time 2	Rank	Time 1	Rank	Time 2	Rank	Total	Rank
Radim Koloušek	DNF	–	DSQ	–	did not advance					
Anton Šoltýs	58.67	43	59.45	23 QF	n/a	?	DSQ	–	DSQ	–

== Cross-country skiing ==
Men

Event	Athlete	Race	
Event	Athlete	Time	Rank
15 km	Ladislav Hrubý	55:44.9	29
30 km	Ladislav Hrubý	1'41:04.8	33
30 km	Štefan Harvan	1'39:05.2	26
50 km	Ladislav Hrubý	3'00:35.4	23
50 km	Štefan Harvan	2'59:33.3	22

Women

Event	Athlete	Race	
Event	Athlete	Time	Rank
5 km	Eva Břízová	20:48.2	26
5 km	Jarmila Škodová	20:46.1	25
5 km	Eva Paulusová-Benešová	20:24.7	22
10 km	Eva Břízová	47:56.0	29
10 km	Jarmila Škodová	47:40.3	27
10 km	Eva Paulusová-Benešová	46:31.2	21

Women's 3 x 5 km relay

Athletes	Race	
Athletes	Time	Rank
Jarmila Škodová; Eva Břízová; Eva Paulusová-Benešová	1'08:42.8	6

== Figure skating ==
Men

Athlete	CF	FS	Points	Places	Rank
Ondrej Nepela	23	17	1590.1	190	22
Karol Divín	2	9	1862.8	32	4

Women

Athlete	CF	FS	Points	Places	Rank
Jana Mrázková	23	24	1646.4	205	25
Hana Mašková	19	10	1714.8	142	15

Pairs

Athletes	Points	Places	Rank
Milada Kublikova; Jaroslav Votruba	88.9	97	10
Agnesa Wlachovska; Peter Bartosiewicz	91.8	84	9

== Ice hockey ==
=== First round ===
Winners (in bold) qualified for the Group A to play for 1st-8th places. Teams, which lost their qualification matches, played in Group B for 9th-16th places.

Team 1	Score	Team 2
**Czechoslovakia**	17–2	Japan

=== Medal round ===
Rank	Team	Pld	W	L	T	GF	GA	Pts
1	Soviet Union	7	7	0	0	54	10	14
2	Sweden	7	5	2	0	47	16	10
3	Czechoslovakia (bronze)	7	5	2	0	38	19	10
4	Canada	7	5	2	0	32	17	10
5	United States	7	2	5	0	29	33	4
6	Finland	7	2	5	0	10	31	4
7	Germany	7	2	5	0	13	49	4
8	Switzerland	7	0	7	0	9	57	0

- Czechoslovakia 11-1 Germany (UTG)
- USSR 7-5 Czechoslovakia
- Czechoslovakia 4-0 Finland
- Czechoslovakia 5-1 Switzerland
- Czechoslovakia 7-1 USA
- Czechoslovakia 3-1 Canada
- Sweden 8-3 Czechoslovakia

**Contestants**; Vladimír Dzurilla; Vladimír Nadrchal; Rudolf Potsch; František Tikal; František Gregor; Stanislav Sventek; Ladislav Šmíd; Vlastimil Bubník; Jaroslav Walter; Miroslav Vlach; Jiří Dolana; Jiří Holík; Josef Černý; Stanislav Prýl; Jozef Golonka; Jaroslav Jiřík; Jan Klapáč

=== Leading scorers ===
Rk	Team	GP	G	A	Pts
3rd	(Czech Republic) Jiri Dolana	7	7	3	10
7th	(Czech Republic) Josef Černý	7	5	5	10

== Luge ==
Men

Athlete	Run 1		Run 2		Run 3		Run 4		Total	
Athlete	Time	Rank	Time	Rank	Time	Rank	Time	Rank	Time	Rank
Roland Urban	DNF	–	–	–	–	–	–	–	DNF	–
Jiří Hujer	56.05	23	55.11	17	1:04.80	29	57.44	25	3:53.40	24
Jan Hamřík	53.57	13	53.24	11	53.65	9	53.91	11	3:34.37	10
Horst Urban	53.32	12	53.13	9	54.13	14	53.92	12	3:34.50	12

(Men's) Doubles

Athletes	Run 1		Run 2		Total	
Athletes	Time	Rank	Time	Rank	Time	Rank
Jan Hamřík; Jiří Hujer	52.75	10	52.66	8	1:45.41	8
Horst Urban; Roland Urban	52.21	7	1:19.49	13	2:11.70	12

Women

Athlete	Run 1		Run 2		Run 3		Run 4		Total	
Athlete	Time	Rank	Time	Rank	Time	Rank	Time	Rank	Time	Rank
Hana Nesvadbová	53.56	7	53.45	7	54.67	10	54.42	10	3:36.10	9
Olina Tylová-Hatlová	51.37	3	57.94	12	51.65	3	51.80	2	3:32.76	6

== Nordic combined ==
Events:

- normal hill ski jumping (Three jumps, best two counted and shown here.)
- 15 km cross-country skiing

Athlete	Event	Ski Jumping				Cross-country			Total	
Athlete	Event	Distance 1	Distance 2	Points	Rank	Time	Points	Rank	Points	Rank
Štefan Olekšák	Individual	64.5	61.5	185.8	24	51:29.5	223.98	6	409.78	13
Josef Kutheil	Individual	67.5	62.5	208.0	13	56:58.3	162.36	28	370.36	21
Miloslav Švaříček	Individual	63.5	67.5	199.8	16	57:16.7	159.08	30	358.88	24

== Ski jumping ==
Athletes performed three jumps, the best two were counted and are shown here.

Athlete	Event	Jump 1		Jump 2		Total	
Athlete	Event	Distance	Points	Distance	Points	Points	Rank
Zbyněk Hubač	Normal hill	73.0	98.3	73.5	98.5	196.8	30
Dalibor Motejlek	Normal hill	76.0	100.0	76.0	102.5	202.5	19
Josef Matouš	Normal hill	80.5	114.3	77.0	103.9	218.2	4
Zbyněk Hubač	Large hill	88.0	102.3	80.0	99.6	201.9	19
Dalibor Motejlek	Large hill	90.5	106.5	84.5	102.3	208.8	10
Josef Matouš	Large hill	85.0	96.2	88.5	104.1	200.3	22

== Speed skating ==
Men

Event	Athlete	Race	
Event	Athlete	Time	Rank
500 m	Oldřich Teplý	43.2	32
1500 m	Oldřich Teplý	2:17.9	32
5000 m	Oldřich Teplý	8:25.6	33

Women

Event	Athlete	Race	
Event	Athlete	Time	Rank
500 m	Jarmila Šťastná	52.0	27
1000 m	Jarmila Šťastná	1:45.8	27
1500 m	Jarmila Šťastná	2:42.9	29
