= Canada at the 1964 Winter Olympics =

- IOC code: CAN
- NOC: Canadian Olympic Committee
- Website: www.olympic.ca (in English and French)

in Innsbruck, Austria 29 January 1964 – 5 February 1964
- Competitors: 55 (43 men, 12 women) in 8 sports
- Flag bearer: Ralf Olin (speed skating)
- Medals Ranked 10th: Gold 1 Silver 1 Bronze 1 Total 3

Winter Olympics appearances (overview)
- 1924; 1928; 1932; 1936; 1948; 1952; 1956; 1960; 1964; 1968; 1972; 1976; 1980; 1984; 1988; 1992; 1994; 1998; 2002; 2006; 2010; 2014; 2018; 2022; 2026

Canada competed at the 1964 Winter Olympics in Innsbruck, Austria. Canada has competed at every Winter Olympic Games.

== Medalists ==
Medal	Name	Sport	Event
Gold	Vic Emery; Peter Kirby; Douglas Anakin; John Emery	Bobsleigh	Four-man
Silver	Debbi Wilkes; Guy Revell	Figure skating	Pairs
Bronze	Petra Burka	Figure skating	Women's singles

== Alpine skiing ==
Men

Athlete	Event	Race	
Athlete	Event	Time	Rank
Peter Duncan	Downhill	2:30.06	34
Rod Hebron	Downhill	2:27.90	30
Gary Battistella	Downhill	2:27.74	28
Jean-Guy Brunet	Downhill	2:26.59	25
Gary Battistella	Giant Slalom	DSQ	–
Rod Hebron	Giant Slalom	DNF	–
Jean-Guy Brunet	Giant Slalom	1:59.60	27
Peter Duncan	Giant Slalom	1:58.44	26

Men's slalom

Athlete	Qualifying				Final					
Athlete	Time 1	Rank	Time 2	Rank	Time 1	Rank	Time 2	Rank	Total	Rank
Peter Duncan	DNF	–	56.43	12 QF	1:14.22	17	1:04.88	18	2:19.10	19
Robert Swan	DSQ	–	DNF	–	did not advance					
Rod Hebron	1:07.56	59	55.99	9 QF	DSQ	–	–	–	DSQ	–
Jean-Guy Brunet	54.98	23 QF	–	–	DSQ	–	–	–	DSQ	–

Women

Athlete	Event	Race 1		Race 2		Total	
Athlete	Event	Time	Rank	Time	Rank	Time	Rank
Nancy Holland	Downhill					2:04.53	34
Karen Dokka	Downhill					2:04.04	28
Linda Crutchfield-Bocock	Downhill					2:03.10	24
Nancy Greene	Downhill					1:59.23	7
Karen Dokka	Giant Slalom					2:09.63	34
Linda Crutchfield-Bocock	Giant Slalom					2:05.04	32
Nancy Holland	Giant Slalom					2:04.39	31
Nancy Greene	Giant Slalom					1:57.76	16
Karen Dokka	Slalom	DSQ	–	–	–	DSQ	–
Nancy Holland	Slalom	DSQ	–	–	–	DSQ	–
Nancy Greene	Slalom	49.95	20	51.47	13	1:41.42	15
Linda Crutchfield-Bocock	Slalom	49.38	18	53.77	19	1:43.15	16

== Bobsleigh ==
Sled	Athletes	Event	Run 1		Run 2		Run 3		Run 4		Total	
Sled	Athletes	Event	Time	Rank	Time	Rank	Time	Rank	Time	Rank	Time	Rank
CAN-1	John Emery; Gordon Currie	Two-man	1:07.85	18	1:07.64	13	1:06.75	10	1:06.63	8	4:28.87	11
CAN-2	Vic Emery; Peter Kirby	Two-man	1:05.15	1	1:05.93	5	1:05.96	6	1:06.45	7	4:23.49	4

Sled	Athletes	Event	Run 1		Run 2		Run 3		Run 4		Total	
Sled	Athletes	Event	Time	Rank	Time	Rank	Time	Rank	Time	Rank	Time	Rank
CAN-1	Vic Emery; Peter Kirby; Doug Anakin; John Emery	Four-man	1:02.99	1	1:03.82	2	1:03.64	2	1:04.01	1	4:14.46	1st place, gold medalist(s)
CAN-2	Monty Gordon; Chris Ondaatje; David Hobart; Gordon Currie	Four-man	1:04.63	13	1:04.43	11	1:05.06	13	1:05.66	14	4:19.78	14

== Cross-country skiing ==
Men

Event	Athlete	Race	
Event	Athlete	Time	Rank
15 km	Martti Rautio	1'02:52.4	65
15 km	Eric Luoma	1'01:39.8	61
15 km	Franz Portmann	58:47.0	51
15 km	Donald MacLeod	55:58.5	34
30 km	Martti Rautio	1'46:18.6	52
30 km	Donald MacLeod	1'42:17.7	38
50 km	Franz Portmann	DNF	–
50 km	Eric Luoma	DNF	–

Men's 4 × 10 km relay

Athletes	Race	
Athletes	Time	Rank
Donald MacLeod; Martti Rautio; Eric Luoma; Franz Portmann	2'44:29.1	15

== Figure skating ==
Men

Athlete	CF	FS	Points	Places	Rank
William Neale	19	14	1667.7	143	16
Charles Snelling	16	15	1705.5	117	13
Donald Knight	7	11	1746.6	85	9

Women

Athlete	CF	FS	Points	Places	Rank
Shirra Kenworthy	10	16	1756.3	104	12
Wendy Griner	13	8	1775.3	91	10
Petra Burka	3	2	1940.0	25	3rd place, bronze medalist(s)

Pairs

Athletes	Points	Places	Rank
Linda Ward; Neil Carpenter	84.2	128.5	16
Faye Strutt; Jim Watters	85.3	122.5	14
Debbi Wilkes; Guy Revell	98.5	35.5	2nd place, silver medalist(s)

== Ice hockey ==
=== First round ===
Winners (in bold) qualified for the Group A to play for 1st-8th places. Teams, which lost their qualification matches, played in Group B for 9th-16th places.

Team 1	Score	Team 2
**Canada**	14–1	Yugoslavia

=== Medal Round ===
Rank	Team	Pld	W	L	T	GF	GA	Pts
1	Soviet Union	7	7	0	0	54	10	14
2	Sweden	7	5	2	0	47	16	10
3	Czechoslovakia	7	5	2	0	38	19	10
4	Canada	7	5	2	0	32	17	10
5	United States	7	2	5	0	29	33	4
6	Finland	7	2	5	0	10	31	4
7	Germany	7	2	5	0	13	49	4
8	Switzerland	7	0	7	0	9	57	0

- Canada 8-0 Switzerland
- Canada 3-1 Sweden
- Canada 4-2 Germany (UTG)
- Canada 8-6 USA
- Canada 6-2 Finland
- Czechoslovakia 3-1 Canada
- USSR 3-2 Canada

**Contestants**; Hank Akervall; Gary Begg; Roger Bourbonnais; Ken Broderick; Ray Cadieux; Terry Clancy; Brian Conacher; Paul Conlin; Gary Dineen; Bob Forhan; Marshall Johnston; Seth Martin; Barry MacKenzie; Terry O'Malley; Rod Seiling; George Swarbrick

=== Leading scorer ===
Rk	Team	GP	G	A	Pts
10th	(Canada) Gary Dineen	7	3	6	9

== Luge ==
Men

Athlete	Run 1		Run 2		Run 3		Run 4		Total	
Athlete	Time	Rank	Time	Rank	Time	Rank	Time	Rank	Time	Rank
Doug Anakin	n/a	?	n/a	?	DNF	–	–	–	DNF	–

== Ski jumping ==
Athletes performed three jumps, the best two were counted and are shown here.

Athlete	Event	Jump 1		Jump 2		Total	
Athlete	Event	Distance	Points	Distance	Points	Points	Rank
John McInnes	Normal hill	65.5	82.9	65.0	83.4	166.3	53
Kaare Lien	Normal hill	72.0	93.9	72.0	94.4	188.3	43
John McInnes	Large hill	79.0	86.4	73.5	80.9	167.3	50
Kaare Lien	Large hill	83.5	91.4	73.0	83.9	175.3	45

== Speed skating ==
Men

Event	Athlete	Race	
Event	Athlete	Time	Rank
500 m	Ralf Olin	44.2	39
1500 m	Gerald Koning	2:24.0	47
1500 m	Ralf Olin	2:19.7	37
5000 m	Gerald Koning	8:26.9	35
5000 m	Ralf Olin	8:18.2	25
10,000 m	Ralf Olin	16:53.3	15

Women

Event	Athlete	Race	
Event	Athlete	Time	Rank
500 m	Doreen McCannell	48.0	13
500 m	Doreen Ryan	47.7	10
1000 m	Doreen McCannell	1:39.4	13
1000 m	Doreen Ryan	1:38.7	11
1500 m	Doreen Ryan	2:34.0	16
1500 m	Doreen McCannell	2:32.7	13
3000 m	Doreen Ryan	5:46.5	24
3000 m	Doreen McCannell	5:26.4	8

== Official Outfitter ==
HBC was the official outfitter of clothing for members of the Canadian Olympic team.
