= Cross-country skiing at the 1964 Winter Olympics – Women's 5 kilometre =

Cross-country skiing at the Olympics

Women's 5km at the IX Olympic Winter Games
- Cross-country skiing
- Venue: Cross Country Skiing Stadium
- Date: 5 February 1964
- Competitors: 32 from 11 nations
- Winning time: 17:50.5

Medalists
1st place, gold medalist(s)		Klavdiya Boyarskikh	Soviet Union
2nd place, silver medalist(s)		Mirja Lehtonen	Finland
3rd place, bronze medalist(s)		Alevtina Kolchina	Soviet Union

The Women's 5 kilometre cross-country skiing event was part of the cross-country skiing programme at the 1964 Winter Olympics, in Innsbruck, Austria. It was the first appearance of the event. The competition was held on 5 February 1964, at the Cross Country Skiing Stadium.

== Results ==
Rank	Name	Country	Time
1	Klavdiya Boyarskikh	Soviet Union	17:50.5
2	Mirja Lehtonen	Finland	17:52.9
3	Alevtina Kolchina	Soviet Union	18:08.4
4	Yevdokiya Mekshilo	Soviet Union	18:16.7
5	Toini Pöysti	Finland	18:25.5
6	Toini Gustafsson	Sweden	18:25.7
7	Barbro Martinsson	Sweden	18:26.4
8	Eeva Ruoppa	Finland	18:29.8
9	Senja Pusula	Finland	18:45.7
10	Rita Achkina	Soviet Union	18:51.1
11	Britt Strandberg	Sweden	19:07.5
12	Rita Czech-Blasl	United Team of Germany	19:09.1
13	Krastana Stoeva	Bulgaria	19:11.2
14	Stefania Biegun	Poland	19:16.0
15	Renate Dannhauer-Borges	Germany	19:17.0
16	Ingrid Wigernæs	Norway	19:17.0
17	Christine Nestler	United Team of Germany	19:21.4
18	Babben Enger-Damon	Norway	19:26.5
19	Elfriede Spiegelhauer-Uhlig	United Team of Germany	19:52.3
20	Heiderun Ludwig	Austria	20:11.3
21	Nadezhda Vasileva	Bulgaria	20:24.2
22	Eva Paulusová-Benešová	Czechoslovakia	20:24.7
23	Teresa Trzebunia	Poland	20:25.8
24	Czesława Stopka	Poland	20:34.4
25	Jarmila Škodová	Czechoslovakia	20:46.1
26	Eva Břízová	Czechoslovakia	20:48.2
27	Weronika Budny	Poland	21:07.1
28	Nadezhda Mikhaylova	Bulgaria	21:18.9
29	Katalin Hemrik	Hungary	21:26.7
30	Jigjeegiin Javzandulam	Mongolia	22:57.5
31	Dorjgotovyn Pürevloov	Mongolia	24:55.8
32	Gun Ädel	Sweden	26:09.0
