= United Team of Germany at the 1964 Winter Olympics =

- "Olympic" Flag of Germany, defaced with white Olympic rings, used 1960, 1964 (and 1968 by separated teams)
- IOC code: EUA
- NOC: United Team of Germany

in Innsbruck
- Competitors: 96 (73 men, 23 women) in 10 sports
- Flag bearer: Georg Thoma (Nordic combined)
- Medals Ranked 6th: Gold 3 Silver 3 Bronze 3 Total 9

Winter Olympics appearances (overview)
- 1956; 1960; 1964

Other related appearances
- Germany (1928–1936, 1952, 1992–pres.); East Germany (1968–1988); West Germany (1968–1988)

Athletes from East Germany (German Democratic Republic; GDR) and West Germany (Federal Republic of Germany; FRG) competed together as the United Team of Germany at the 1964 Winter Olympics in Innsbruck, Austria.

== Medalists ==
| Medal | Name | Nationality | Sport | Event |
|---|---|---|---|---|
| Gold | Manfred Schnelldorfer | West Germany | Figure skating | Men's singles |
| Gold | Thomas Köhler | East Germany | Luge | Men's singles |
| Gold | Ortrun Enderlein | East Germany | Luge | Women's singles |
| Silver | Marika Kilius; Hans Jürgen Bäumler | West Germany (both) | Figure skating | Pairs |
| Silver | Klaus-Michael Bonsack | East Germany | Luge | Men's singles |
| Silver | Ilse Geisler | East Germany | Luge | Women's singles |
| Bronze | Wolfgang Bartels | West Germany | Alpine skiing | Men's downhill |
| Bronze | Hans Plenk | West Germany | Luge | Men's singles |
| Bronze | Georg Thoma | West Germany | Nordic combined | Men's individual |

== Alpine skiing ==
Men

| Athlete | Event | Race | |
| Athlete | Event | Time | Rank |
|---|---|---|---|
| Fritz Wagnerberger | Downhill | 2:21.03 | 12 |
| Willy Bogner | Downhill | 2:20.72 | 9 |
| Ludwig Leitner | Downhill | 2:19.67 | 5 |
| Wolfgang Bartels | Downhill | 2:19.48 | 3rd place, bronze medalist(s) |
| Willy Bogner | Giant Slalom | DSQ | – |
| Wolfgang Bartels | Giant Slalom | DNF | – |
| Eberhard Riedel | Giant Slalom | 1:54.17 | 15 |
| Luggi Leitner | Giant Slalom | 1:50.04 | 8 |

Men's slalom

| Athlete | Qualifying | | | | Final | | | | | |
| Athlete | Time 1 | Rank | Time 2 | Rank | Time 1 | Rank | Time 2 | Rank | Total | Rank |
|---|---|---|---|---|---|---|---|---|---|---|
| Wolfgang Bartels | 57.91 | 40 | 55.84 | 8 QF | 1:13.83 | 14 | 1:02.09 | 7 | 2:15.92 | 9 |
| Eberhard Riedel | 55.88 | 30 | 54.44 | 3 QF | 1:13.57 | 11 | 1:05.28 | 21 | 2:18.85 | 18 |
| Ernst Scherzer | 54.77 | 19 QF | – | – | 1:14.67 | 21 | 1:03.43 | 14 | 2:18.10 | 13 |
| Luggi Leitner | 51.45 | 2 QF | – | – | 1:11.19 | 8 | 1:01.75 | 4 | 2:12.94 | 5 |

Women

| Athlete | Event | Race 1 | | Race 2 | | Total | |
| Athlete | Event | Time | Rank | Time | Rank | Time | Rank |
|---|---|---|---|---|---|---|---|
| Heidi Mittermaier | Downhill | | | | | 2:03.05 | 23 |
| Burgl Färbinger | Downhill | | | | | 2:01.23 | 12 |
| Barbi Henneberger | Downhill | | | | | 1:58.03 | 5 |
| Heidi Biebl | Downhill | | | | | 1:57.87 | 4 |
| Heidi Biebl | Giant Slalom | | | | | DSQ | – |
| Heidi Mittermaier | Giant Slalom | | | | | 2:00.77 | 22 |
| Burgl Färbinger | Giant Slalom | | | | | 1:58.84 | 18 |
| Barbi Henneberger | Giant Slalom | | | | | 1:54.26 | 7 |
| Burgl Färbinger | Slalom | DSQ | – | – | – | DSQ | – |
| Heidi Mittermaier | Slalom | 47.41 | 16 | 50.14 | 9 | 1:37.55 | 10 |
| Barbi Henneberger | Slalom | 47.17 | 14 | 50.38 | 10 | 1:37.55 | 10 |
| Heidi Biebl | Slalom | 44.61 | 4 | 49.43 | 7 | 1:34.04 | 4 |

== Biathlon ==
Men

| Event | Athlete | Time | Misses | Adjusted time ^{1} | Rank |
|---|---|---|---|---|---|
| 20 km | Dieter Ritter | 1'22:51.4 | 8 | 1'38:51.4 | 33 |
| 20 km | Helmut Klöpsch | 1'32:08.5 | 3 | 1'38:08.5 | 31 |
| 20 km | Egon Schnabel | 1'30:53.0 | 2 | 1'34:53.0 | 24 |
| 20 km | Hans-Dieter Riechel | 1'28:30.9 | 3 | 1'34:30.9 | 21 |

^{1} Two minutes added per miss.

== Bobsleigh ==
| Sled | Athletes | Event | Run 1 | | Run 2 | | Run 3 | | Run 4 | | Total | |
| Sled | Athletes | Event | Time | Rank | Time | Rank | Time | Rank | Time | Rank | Time | Rank |
|---|---|---|---|---|---|---|---|---|---|---|---|---|
| GER-1 | Franz Wörmann; Hubert Braun | Two-man | 1:06.87 | 10 | 1:06.42 | 8 | 1:05.17 | 1 | 1:06.24 | 3 | 4:27.70 | 6 |
| GER-2 | Hans Maurer; Rupert Grasegger | Two-man | 1:06.72 | 8 | 1:07.76 | 16 | 1:06.92 | 12 | 1:08.37 | 17 | 4:29.77 | 14 |

| Sled | Athletes | Event | Run 1 | | Run 2 | | Run 3 | | Run 4 | | Total | |
| Sled | Athletes | Event | Time | Rank | Time | Rank | Time | Rank | Time | Rank | Time | Rank |
|---|---|---|---|---|---|---|---|---|---|---|---|---|
| GER-1 | Franz Schelle; Ludwig Siebert; Josef Sterff; Otto Göbl | Four-man | 1:04.21 | 7 | 1:03.50 | 1 | 1:04.15 | 5 | 1:04.33 | 6 | 4:16.19 | 5 |
| GER-2 | Franz Wörmann; Anton Wackerle; Rupert Grasegger; Hubert Braun | Four-man | 1:04.47 | 10 | 1:04.42 | 10 | 1:05.25 | 14 | 1:04.54 | 7 | 4:18.68 | 9 |

== Cross-country skiing ==
Men

| Event | Athlete | Race | |
| Event | Athlete | Time | Rank |
|---|---|---|---|
| 15 km | Karl Buhl | 57:10.2 | 44 |
| 15 km | Helmut Weidlich | 56:04.6 | 36 |
| 15 km | Enno Röder | 54:52.8 | 24 |
| 15 km | Walter Demel | 54:37.0 | 22 |
| 30 km | Alfons Dorner | 1'41:09.5 | 34 |
| 30 km | Rudolf Dannhauer | 1'40:35.7 | 32 |
| 30 km | Heinz Seidel | 1'40:01.0 | 29 |
| 30 km | Walter Demel | 1'33:10.2 | 10 |
| 50 km | Rudolf Dannhauer | DNF | – |
| 50 km | Herbert Steinbeißer | 3'06:52.2 | 30 |
| 50 km | Siegfried Weiß | 3'00:43.0 | 24 |

Men's 4 × 10 km relay

| Athletes | Race | |
| Athletes | Time | Rank |
|---|---|---|
| Heinz Seidel; Helmut Weidlich; Enno Röder; Walter Demel | 2'26:34.4 | 7 |

Women

| Event | Athlete | Race | |
| Event | Athlete | Time | Rank |
|---|---|---|---|
| 5 km | Elfriede Spiegelhauer-Uhlig | 19:52.3 | 19 |
| 5 km | Christine Nestler | 19:21.4 | 17 |
| 5 km | Renate Dannhauer-Borges | 19:17.0 | 15 |
| 5 km | Rita Czech-Blasl | 19:09.1 | 12 |
| 10 km | Elfriede Spiegelhauer-Uhlig | 44:08.8 | 16 |
| 10 km | Rita Czech-Blasl | 44:07.8 | 15 |
| 10 km | Renate Dannhauer-Borges | 43:52.7 | 14 |
| 10 km | Christine Nestler | 43:38.2 | 13 |

Women's 3 x 5 km relay

| Athletes | Race | |
| Athletes | Time | Rank |
|---|---|---|
| Christine Nestler; Rita Czech-Blasl; Renate Dannhauer-Borges | 1'04:29.9 | 4 |

== Figure skating ==
Men

| Athlete | CF | FS | Points | Places | Rank |
|---|---|---|---|---|---|
| Sepp Schönmetzler | 12 | 8 | 1743.1 | 92 | 12 |
| Ralph Borghard | 10 | 7 | 1742.2 | 90 | 11 |
| Manfred Schnelldorfer | 1 | 1 | 1916.9 | 13 | 1st place, gold medalist(s) |

Women

| Athlete | CF | FS | Points | Places | Rank |
|---|---|---|---|---|---|
| Uschi Keszler | 25 | 18 | 1642.3 | 213 | 24 |
| Franziska Schmidt | 22 | 21 | 1662.8 | 193 | 23 |
| Gabriele Seyfert | 21 | 17 | 1685.1 | 177 | 19 |
| Inge Paul | 17 | 12 | 1720.3 | 139 | 14 |

Pairs

| Athletes | Points | Places | Rank |
|---|---|---|---|
| Margit Senf; Peter Göbel | 87.9 | 113.5 | 13 |
| Brigitte Wokoeck; Heinz-Ulrich Walther | 88.8 | 103.5 | 11 |
| Marika Kilius; Hans-Jürgen Bäumler | 103.6 | 15 | (silver) ^{1} |

^{1} Pairs silver medalists Marika Kilius and Hans-Jürgen Bäumler were stripped of their silver medals in 1966 because it had been found out that they had signed professional contracts before the Olympics. At the time, only amateurs could compete in the Olympic Games. Although they were reawarded the medal in 1987, many official results lists have removed them entirely.

== Ice hockey ==
=== First round ===
Winners (in bold) qualified for the Group A to play for 1st-8th places. Teams, which lost their qualification matches, played in Group B for 9th-16th places.

| Team 1 | Score | Team 2 |
|---|---|---|
| **Germany** | 2–1 | Poland |

=== Medal Round ===
| Rank | Team | Pld | W | L | T | GF | GA | Pts |
|---|---|---|---|---|---|---|---|---|
| 1 | Soviet Union | 7 | 7 | 0 | 0 | 54 | 10 | 14 |
| 2 | Sweden | 7 | 5 | 2 | 0 | 47 | 16 | 10 |
| 3 | Czechoslovakia | 7 | 5 | 2 | 0 | 38 | 19 | 10 |
| 4 | Canada | 7 | 5 | 2 | 0 | 32 | 17 | 10 |
| 5 | United States | 7 | 2 | 5 | 0 | 29 | 33 | 4 |
| 6 | Finland | 7 | 2 | 5 | 0 | 10 | 31 | 4 |
| 7 | Germany | 7 | 2 | 5 | 0 | 13 | 49 | 4 |
| 8 | Switzerland | 7 | 0 | 7 | 0 | 9 | 57 | 0 |

- Czechoslovakia 11-1 Germany
- USA 8-0 Germany
- Canada 4-2 Germany
- Sweden 10-2 Germany
- USSR 10-0 Germany
- Germany 6-5 Switzerland
- Germany 2-1 Finland

| **Contestants**; Paul Ambros; Bernd Herzig; Michael Hobelsberger; Ernst Köpf; Albert Loibl; Sepp Reif; Otto Schneitberger; Georg Scholz; Siegfried Schubert; Dieter Schwimmbeck; Ernst Tautwein; Leonhard Waitl; Helmut Zanghellini; Kurt Sepp; Ulli Jansen; Horst Franz Schuldes; Sylvester Wackerle, Jr. |

== Luge ==
Men

| Athlete | Run 1 | | Run 2 | | Run 3 | | Run 4 | | Total | |
| Athlete | Time | Rank | Time | Rank | Time | Rank | Time | Rank | Time | Rank |
|---|---|---|---|---|---|---|---|---|---|---|
| Fritz Nachmann | DNF | – | – | – | – | – | – | – | DNF | – |
| Hans Plenk | 52.12 | 3 | 52.25 | 3 | 52.31 | 3 | 53.47 | 7 | 3:30.15 | 3rd place, bronze medalist(s) |
| Klaus-Michael Bonsack | 51.61 | 2 | 51.33 | 1 | 51.68 | 2 | 52.42 | 1 | 3:27.04 | 2nd place, silver medalist(s) |
| Thomas Köhler | 51.27 | 1 | 51.53 | 2 | 51.50 | 1 | 52.47 | 2 | 3:26.77 | 1st place, gold medalist(s) |

(Men's) Doubles

| Athletes | Run 1 | | Run 2 | | Total | |
| Athletes | Time | Rank | Time | Rank | Time | Rank |
|---|---|---|---|---|---|---|
| Walter Eggert; Helmut Vollprecht | 51.27 | 3 | 51.81 | 4 | 1:43.08 | 4 |
| Thomas Köhler; Klaus-Michael Bonsack | DNF | – | – | – | DNF | – |

Women

| Athlete | Run 1 | | Run 2 | | Run 3 | | Run 4 | | Total | |
| Athlete | Time | Rank | Time | Rank | Time | Rank | Time | Rank | Time | Rank |
|---|---|---|---|---|---|---|---|---|---|---|
| Minna Blüml | 56.87 | 16 | 53.80 | 8 | 52.33 | 4 | 53.32 | 6 | 3:36.32 | 10 |
| Ilse Geisler | 51.28 | 2 | 51.48 | 2 | 51.20 | 2 | 53.46 | 7 | 3:27.42 | 2nd place, silver medalist(s) |
| Ortrun Enderlein | 51.13 | 1 | 51.12 | 1 | 50.87 | 1 | 51.55 | 1 | 3:24.67 | 1st place, gold medalist(s) |

== Nordic combined ==
Events:

- normal hill ski jumping (Three jumps, best two counted and shown here.)
- 15 km cross-country skiing

| Athlete | Event | Ski Jumping | | | | Cross-country | | | Total | |
| Athlete | Event | Distance 1 | Distance 2 | Points | Rank | Time | Points | Rank | Points | Rank |
|---|---|---|---|---|---|---|---|---|---|---|
| Horst Möhwald | Individual | 65.5 | 61.0 | 189.2 | 23 | 52:56.2 | 206.98 | 11 | 396.18 | 17 |
| Rainer Dietel | Individual | 72.0 | 67.5 | 223.8 | 6 | 54:07.3 | 193.34 | 15 | 417.14 | 9 |
| Georg Thoma | Individual | 73.0 | 71.0 | 241.1 | 1 | 52:31.2 | 211.78 | 10 | 452.88 | 3rd place, bronze medalist(s) |
| Roland Weißpflog | Individual | 71.0 | 68.0 | 232.4 | 4 | 56:18.2 | 169.30 | 23 | 401.70 | 16 |

== Ski jumping ==
Athletes performed three jumps, the best two were counted and are shown here.

| Athlete | Event | Jump 1 | | Jump 2 | | Total | |
| Athlete | Event | Distance | Points | Distance | Points | Points | Rank |
|---|---|---|---|---|---|---|---|
| Max Bolkart | Normal hill | 72.5 | 98.1 | 70.0 | 93.4 | 191.5 | 37 |
| Helmut Recknagel | Normal hill | 77.0 | 105.4 | 75.5 | 105.0 | 210.4 | 6 |
| Karl-Heinz Munk | Normal hill | 77.0 | 104.9 | 75.0 | 102.1 | 207.0 | 9 |
| Dieter Neuendorf | Normal hill | 78.5 | 109.3 | 77.0 | 105.4 | 214.7 | 5 |
| Dieter Bokeloh | Large hill | 92.0 | 108.1 | 83.5 | 106.5 | 214.6 | 4 |
| Dieter Neuendorf | Large hill | 92.5 | 109.8 | 84.5 | 102.8 | 212.6 | 8 |
| Karl-Heinz Munk | Large hill | 87.0 | 104.5 | 80.0 | 96.1 | 200.6 | 21 |
| Helmut Recknagel | Large hill | 89.0 | 107.0 | 86.5 | 105.8 | 212.8 | 7 |

== Speed skating ==
Men

| Event | Athlete | Race | |
| Event | Athlete | Time | Rank |
|---|---|---|---|
| 500 m | Günter Traub | 43.4 | 33 |
| 500 m | Günther Tilch | 42.3 | 24 |
| 500 m | Herbert Höfl | 42.3 | 24 |
| 500 m | Helmut Kuhnert | 41.8 | 16 |
| 1500 m | Jürgen Schmidt | 2:20.0 | 39 |
| 1500 m | Gerd Zimmermann | 2:17.3 | 29 |
| 1500 m | Herbert Höfl | 2:16.8 | 26 |
| 1500 m | Günter Traub | 2:15.3 | 17 |
| 5000 m | Jürgen Schmidt | 8:36.6 | 39 |
| 5000 m | Gerd Zimmermann | 7:56.8 | 13 |
| 5000 m | Günter Traub | 7:53.9 | 11 |
| 10,000 m | Jürgen Traub | 17:08.9 | 21 |
| 10,000 m | Günter Traub | 16:58.4 | 19 |
| 10,000 m | Gerd Zimmermann | 16:22.5 | 7 |

Women

| Event | Athlete | Race | |
| Event | Athlete | Time | Rank |
|---|---|---|---|
| 500 m | Sigrit Behrenz | 50.9 | 25 |
| 500 m | Brigitte Reichert | 49.8 | 21 |
| 500 m | Helga Haase | 47.2 | 8 |
| 1000 m | Brigitte Reichert | 1:44.9 | 25 |
| 1000 m | Erika Heinicke | 1:43.2 | 23 |
| 1000 m | Helga Haase | 1:35.7 | 4 |
| 1500 m | Erika Heinicke | 2:40.4 | 28 |
| 1500 m | Inge Lieckfeldt | 2:36.2 | 21 |
| 1500 m | Helga Haase | 2:28.6 | 5 |
| 3000 m | Erika Heinicke | 5:56.0 | 28 |
| 3000 m | Inge Lieckfeldt | 5:42.7 | 21 |
| 3000 m | Rita Blankenburg | 5:40.8 | 17 |
