= Japan at the 1964 Winter Olympics =

- IOC code: JPN
- NOC: Japanese Olympic Committee
- Website: www.joc.or.jp (in Japanese and English)

in Innsbruck
- Competitors: 47 (41 men, 6 women) in 8 sports
- Flag bearer: Sadao Kikuchi
- Medals: Gold 0 Silver 0 Bronze 0 Total 0

Winter Olympics appearances (overview)
- 1928; 1932; 1936; 1948; 1952; 1956; 1960; 1964; 1968; 1972; 1976; 1980; 1984; 1988; 1992; 1994; 1998; 2002; 2006; 2010; 2014; 2018; 2022; 2026

Japan competed at the 1964 Winter Olympics in Innsbruck, Austria.

== Alpine skiing ==
Men

Athlete	Event	Race	
Athlete	Event	Time	Rank
Yoshihiro Ohira	Downhill	2:40.82	57
Tsuneo Noto	Downhill	2:34.76	46
Yoshiharu Fukuhara	Downhill	2:34.55	45
Hajime Tomii	Downhill	2:30.02	33
Yoshinari Kida	Giant Slalom	2:04.22	39
Tsuneo Noto	Giant Slalom	2:01.26	35
Yoshiharu Fukuhara	Giant Slalom	1:58.35	25
Hajime Tomii	Giant Slalom	1:56.65	22

Men's slalom

Athlete	Qualifying				Final					
Athlete	Time 1	Rank	Time 2	Rank	Time 1	Rank	Time 2	Rank	Total	Rank
Hajime Tomii	1:20.85	78	57.44	17 QF	1:18.49	32	1:06.60	27	2:25.09	31
Yoshiharu Fukuharu	1:01.66	49	54.07	2 QF	1:14.35	19	1:06.36	24	2:20.71	23
Yoshinari Kida	57.36	37	58.06	18 QF	1:19.11	35	1:10.00	35	2:29.11	34
Yoshihiro Ohira	56.31	31	59.09	19 QF	1:28.79	41	1:09.08	33	2:37.87	38

== Biathlon ==
Men

Event	Athlete	Time	Misses	Adjusted time ^{1}	Rank
20 km	Yoshio Ninomine	1'29:38.6	3	1'35:38.6	26
20 km	Yuji Yamanaka	1'29:51.8	2	1'33:51.8	19

^{1} Two minutes added per miss.

== Cross-country skiing ==
Men

Event	Athlete	Race	
Event	Athlete	Time	Rank
15 km	Chogoro Yahata	1'00:46.1	58
15 km	Hidezo Takahashi	57:03.4	42
15 km	Kazuo Sato	56:04.5	35
15 km	Tatsuo Kitamura	55:24.3	26
30 km	Chogoro Yahata	1'51:45.3	62
30 km	Tatsuo Kitamura	1'46:13.4	51
30 km	Hidezo Takahashi	1'43:11.0	47
30 km	Kazuo Sato	1'42:39.2	41
50 km	Chogoro Yahata	DNF	–
50 km	Hidezo Takahashi	3'14:31.4	35
50 km	Kazuo Sato	3'03:57.9	27

Men's 4 × 10 km relay

Athletes	Race	
Athletes	Time	Rank
Hidezo Takahashi; Kazuo Sato; Tatsuo Kitamura; Chogoro Yahata	2'32:05.5	10

== Figure skating ==
Men

Athlete	CF	FS	Points	Places	Rank
Nobuo Sato	8	10	1746.2	88	8

Women

Athlete	CF	FS	Points	Places	Rank
Junko Ueno	14	26	1685.0	170	22
Kumiko Okawa	15	11	1725.4	136	13
Miwa Fukuhara	4	9	1845.1	50	5

== Ice hockey ==
=== First round ===
Winners (in bold) qualified for the Group A to play for 1st-8th places. Teams, which lost their qualification matches, played in Group B for 9th-16th places.

Team 1	Score	Team 2
**Czechoslovakia**	17–2	Japan

=== Consolation round ===
Rank	Team	Pld	W	L	T	GF	GA	Pts
9	Poland	7	6	1	0	40	13	12
10	Norway	7	5	2	0	40	19	10
11	Japan	7	4	2	1	35	31	9
12	Romania	7	3	3	1	31	28	7
13	Austria	7	3	3	1	24	28	7
14	Yugoslavia	7	3	3	1	29	37	7
15	Italy	7	2	5	0	24	42	4
16	Hungary	7	0	7	0	14	39	0

- Japan 4-3 Norway
- Japan 6-4 Romania
- Austria 5-5 Japan
- Yugoslavia 6-4 Japan
- Japan 4-3 Poland
- Japan 6-2 Hungary
- Italy 8-6 Japan

**Contestants**; Shinichi Honma; Toshiei Honma; Hidenori Inatsu; Atsuo Irie; Koji Iwamoto; Kimio Kazahari; Isao Kawabuchi; Kimihisa Kudo; Hiroyuki Matsuura; Katsuji Morishima; Minoru Nakano; Jiro Ogawa; Isao Ono; Masahiro Sato; Shigeru Shimada; Mamoru Takashima; Masami Tanabu

== Nordic combined ==
Events:

- normal hill ski jumping (Three jumps, best two counted and shown here.)
- 15 km cross-country skiing

Athlete	Event	Ski Jumping				Cross-country			Total	
Athlete	Event	Distance 1	Distance 2	Points	Rank	Time	Points	Rank	Points	Rank
Takashi Fujisawa	Individual	63.5	68.0	208.1	12	56:31.0	167.12	26	375.22	20
Akemi Taniguchi	Individual	57.0 (fall)	56.5	121.5	32	56:14.1	170.01	22	291.51	31
Eiichi Tanaka	Individual	62.5	62.0	190.2	22	58:23.9	147.30	31	337.50	30

== Ski jumping ==
Athletes performed three jumps, the best two were counted and are shown here.

Athlete	Event	Jump 1		Jump 2		Total	
Athlete	Event	Distance	Points	Distance	Points	Points	Rank
Naoki Shimura	Normal hill	71.5	95.2	71.0	95.7	190.9	40
Yosuke Eto	Normal hill	72.0	98.4	73.0	100.0	198.4	27
Sadao Kikuchi	Normal hill	74.0	99.7	72.5	98.8	198.5	26
Yukio Kasaya	Normal hill	74.5	101.4	73.5	99.2	200.6	23
Yosuke Eto	Large hill	80.0	91.4	70.0	86.4	177.8	44
Sadao Kikuchi	Large hill	78.5	87.4	74.5	87.4	174.8	47
Naoki Shimura	Large hill	82.0	94.1	76.5	90.4	184.5	37
Yukio Kasaya	Large hill	87.0	101.6	86.0	105.1	206.7	11

== Speed skating ==
Men

Event	Athlete	Race	
Event	Athlete	Time	Rank
500 m	Satoshi Shinpo	44.4	41
500 m	Fumio Nagakubo	41.8	16
500 m	Keiichi Suzuki	40.7	5
1500 m	Toyofumi Aruga	2:20.7	41
1500 m	Satoshi Shinpo	2:18.5	34
1500 m	Keiichi Suzuki	2:17.5	31
5000 m	Yoshihiro Kawano	8:19.4	26
5000 m	Toyofumi Aruga	8:15.9	24
5000 m	Satoshi Shinpo	8:12.5	23
10,000 m	Yoshihiro Kawano	17:39.0	32
10,000 m	Satoshi Shinpo	17:11.3	24
10,000 m	Toyofumi Aruga	17:09.9	22

Women

Event	Athlete	Race	
Event	Athlete	Time	Rank
500 m	Kaneko Takahashi	50.5	24
500 m	Yasuko Takano	49.3	19
500 m	Hatsue Nagakubo-Takamizawa	47.9	12
1000 m	Hatsue Nagakubo-Takamizawa	DNF	–
1000 m	Yasuko Takano	1:41.6	20
1000 m	Kaneko Takahashi	1:40.5	18
1500 m	Kaneko Takahashi	2:34.6	18
1500 m	Yasuko Takano	2:33.1	14
1500 m	Hatsue Nagakubo-Takamizawa	2:30.9	10
3000 m	Kaneko Takahashi	5:39.6	16
3000 m	Yasuko Takano	5:30.4	12
3000 m	Hatsue Nagakubo-Takamizawa	5:25.4	6
