= Cross-country skiing at the 1964 Winter Olympics – Women's 3 × 5 kilometre relay =

Women's 3 × 5 kilometre relay at the IX Olympic Winter Games
- Cross-country skiing
- Venue: Cross Country Skiing Stadium
- Date: 7 February 1964
- Competitors: 24 from 8 nations
- Winning time: 59:20.2

Medalists
1st place, gold medalist(s)		Alevtina Kolchina; Yevdokiya Mekshilo; Klavdiya Boyarskikh	Soviet Union
2nd place, silver medalist(s)		Barbro Martinsson; Britt Strandberg; Toini Gustafsson	Sweden
3rd place, bronze medalist(s)		Senja Pusula; Toini Pöysti; Mirja Lehtonen	Finland

The women's 3 × 5 kilometre relay cross-country skiing event was part of the cross-country skiing programme at the 1964 Winter Olympics, in Innsbruck, Austria. It was the third appearance of the event. The competition was held on 7 February 1964, at the Cross Country Skiing Stadium.

== Results ==
Rank	Name	Country	Time
1	Alevtina Kolchina; Yevdokiya Mekshilo; Klavdiya Boyarskikh	Soviet Union	59:20.2
2	Barbro Martinsson; Britt Strandberg; Toini Gustafsson	Sweden	1:01:27.0
3	Senja Pusula; Toini Pöysti; Mirja Lehtonen	Finland	1:02:45.1
4	Christine Nestler; Rita Czech-Blasel; Renate Dannhauer-Borges	United Team of Germany	1:04:29.9
5	Roza Dimova; Nadezhda Vasileva; Krastana Stoeva	Bulgaria	1:06:40.4
6	Jarmila Škodová; Eva Břízová; Eva Paulusová-Benešová	Czechoslovakia	1:08:42.8
7	Teresa Trzebunia; Czesława Stopka; Stefania Biegun	Poland	1:08:55.4
8	Éva Balázs; Mária Tarnai; Katalin Hemrik	Hungary	1:10:16.3
