= North Korea at the 1964 Winter Olympics =

- IOC code: PRK (NKO used at these Games)
- NOC: Olympic Committee of the Democratic People's Republic of Korea

in Innsbruck
- Competitors: 13 (6 men, 7 women) in 2 sports
- Medals Ranked 13th: Gold 0 Silver 1 Bronze 0 Total 1

Winter Olympics appearances (overview)
- 1964; 1968; 1972; 1976–1980; 1984; 1988; 1992; 1994; 1998; 2002; 2006; 2010; 2014; 2018; 2022; 2026; 2030

Other related appearances
- Korea (2018)

North Korea competed as North Korea at the 1964 Winter Olympics in Innsbruck, Austria. It was the first time that the nation was represented at any Olympic Games. Han Pil-hwa is the first Winter Olympic medalist from either Korea before South Korea won its first winter medals in 1992 starting with Kim Ki-hoon.

== Medalists ==
Medal	Name	Sport	Event
Silver	Han Pil-Hwa	Speed skating	Women's 3000m

== Cross-country skiing ==
Men

Event	Athlete	Race	
Event	Athlete	Time	Rank
30 km	Kim Ko-Am	1'55:11.0	65
30 km	Yang Duk-Soon	1'53:58.4	63

Women

Event	Athlete	Race	
Event	Athlete	Time	Rank
10 km	Ri Han-Soon	53:21.8	33
10 km	Kim Bong-Za	52:18.6	32

== Speed skating ==
Men

Event	Athlete	Race	
Event	Athlete	Time	Rank
500 m	Ri Sung-Ryool	43.0	30
500 m	Kim Zin-Hook	41.9	19
1500 m	Kim Zin-Hook	2:19.4	36
1500 m	Ri Sung-Ryool	2:13.9	14
5000 m	Kim Choon-Bong	8:22.9	30
5000 m	Bak Sung-Wun	8:20.2	28
10,000 m	Kim Choon-Bong	17:10.8	23

Women

Event	Athlete	Race	
Event	Athlete	Time	Rank
500 m	Han Pil-Hwa	58.5	28
500 m	Ryoo Choon-Za	48.4	15
1000 m	Ryoo Choon-Za	1:40.0	16
1500 m	An Sen-Za	2:44.7	30
1500 m	Han Pil-Hwa	2:30.1	9
1500 m	Kim Song-Soon	2:27.7	4
3000 m	Bak Wol-Ja	5:30.8	13
3000 m	Kim Song-Soon	5:25.9	7
3000 m	Han Pil-Hwa	5:18.5	2nd place, silver medalist(s)
