= Nordic combined at the 1964 Winter Olympics =

Nordic combined at the IX Olympic Winter Games
- Venue: Seefeld in Tirol
- Dates: 2–3 February 1964
- Competitors: 32 from 11 nations
- Winning score: 469.28

Medalists
1st place, gold medalist(s)		Tormod Knutsen	Norway
2nd place, silver medalist(s)		Nikolay Kiselyov	Soviet Union
3rd place, bronze medalist(s)		Georg Thoma	United Team of Germany

Nordic combined at the 1964 Winter Olympics consisted of one event, held 2–3 February at Seefeld in Tirol.

== Medal summary ==
=== Medal table ===
Rank	Nation	Gold	Silver	Bronze	Total
1	Norway	1	0	0	1
2	Soviet Union	0	1	0	1
3	United Team of Germany	0	0	1	1
Totals (3 entries)		1	1	1	3

=== Events ===
Event	Gold		Silver		Bronze	
Individual	Tormod Knutsen; Norway	469.28	Nikolay Kiselyov; Soviet Union	453.04	Georg Thoma; United Team of Germany	452.88

== Individual ==
Athletes did three normal hill ski jumps, with the lowest score dropped. They then raced a 15 kilometre cross-country course, with the time converted to points. The athlete with the highest combined points score was awarded the gold medal.

Rank	Name	Country	Ski jumping					Cross-country			Total
Rank	Name	Country	Jump 1	Jump 2	Jump 3	Total	Rank	Time	Points	Rank	Total
1st place, gold medalist(s)	Tormod Knutsen	Norway	120.8	118.1	~~110.2~~	238.9	2	50:58.6	230.38	4	469.28
2nd place, silver medalist(s)	Nikolay Kiselyov	Soviet Union	113.9	~~94.1~~	119.1	233.0	3	51:49.1	220.04	8	453.04
3rd place, bronze medalist(s)	Georg Thoma	United Team of Germany	122.0	119.1	~~112.7~~	241.1	1	52:31.2	211.78	10	452.88
4	Nikolay Gusakov	Soviet Union	~~100.3~~	103.4	120.0	223.4	7	51:19.8	225.96	5	449.36
5	Arne Larsen	Norway	96.5	101.8	~~81.2~~	198.3	17	50:49.6	232.33	3	430.63
6	Arne Barhaugen	Norway	95.7	~~91.6~~	95.6	191.3	20	50:40.4	234.33	2	425.63
7	Vyacheslav Dryagin	Soviet Union	~~95.9~~	101.8	114.4	216.2	10	52:58.3	206.55	12	422.75
8	Ezio Damolin	Italy	99.5	~~90.9~~	98.6	198.1	18	51:42.3	221.44	7	419.54
9	Rainer Dietel	United Team of Germany	114.5	109.3	~~108.3~~	223.8	6	54:07.3	193.34	15	417.14
10	Willy Köstinger	Austria	113.8	~~101.0~~	111.7	225.5	5	54:35.5	188.18	18	413.68
11	Bjørn Wirkola	Norway	101.9	~~101.0~~	115.3	217.2	9	53:51.9	196.34	14	413.54
12	Alois Kälin	Switzerland	~~61.7~~	81.6	78.3	159.9	28	49:12.8	253.33	1	413.23
13	Štefan Olekšák	Czechoslovakia	94.8	91.0	~~88.6~~	185.8	24	51:29.5	223.98	6	409.78
14	Erwin Fiedor	Poland	105.4	113.7	~~97.1~~	219.1	8	54:41.3	187.06	19	406.16
15	John Bower	United States	90.9	~~90.8~~	100.2	191.1	21	52:26.4	212.66	9	403.76
16	Roland Weißpflog	United Team of Germany	~~101.3~~	117.1	115.3	232.4	4	56:18.2	169.30	23	401.70
17	Horst Möhwald	United Team of Germany	97.0	~~89.4~~	92.2	189.2	23	52:56.2	206.98	11	396.18
18	Enzo Perin	Italy	~~81.6~~	102.6	97.8	200.4	15	54:17.7	191.42	17	391.82
19	Waldemar Heigenhauser	Austria	105.4	105.0	~~83.7~~	210.4	11	56:24.1	168.32	25	378.72
20	Takashi Fujisawa	Japan	99.8	108.3	~~96.4~~	208.1	12	56:31.0	167.12	26	375.22
21	Josef Kutheil	Czechoslovakia	105.4	~~92.5~~	102.6	208.0	13	56:58.3	162.36	28	370.36
22	Erkki Luiro	Finland	103.5	~~101.8~~	103.5	207.0	14	56:57.3	162.50	27	369.50
23	Raimo Majuri	Finland	~~91.5~~	99.4	93.3	192.7	19	55:44.5	175.52	21	368.22
24	Miloslav Švaříček	Czechoslovakia	~~91.3~~	96.2	103.6	199.8	16	57:16.7	159.08	30	358.88
25	Esa Klinga	Finland	94.4	~~77.3~~	78.7	173.1	26	55:22.4	179.49	20	352.59
26	Raimo Partanen	Finland	83.9	72.7	~~54.0~~	156.6	29	54:15.9	191.78	16	348.38
27	Jim Shea	United States	72.1	69.2	~~58.4~~	141.3	31	53:04.2	205.46	13	346.76
28	Leopold Kohl	Austria	82.2	~~74.9~~	99.4	181.6	25	57:09.8	160.26	29	341.86
29	Franz Scherübl	Austria	~~75.2~~	76.6	93.0	169.6	27	56:19.9	169.00	24	338.60
30	Eiichi Tanaka	Japan	~~89.7~~	90.0	100.2	190.2	22	58:23.9	147.30	31	337.50
31	Akemi Taniguchi	Japan	39.7	81.8	~~38.0~~	121.5	32	56:14.1	170.01	22	291.51
-	Jim Page	United States	80.1	~~71.4~~	72.2	152.3	30	DNS	-	-	-

== Participating NOCs ==
Eleven nations participated in Nordic combined at the Innsbruck Games.

- Austria (4)
- Czechoslovakia (3)
- Finland (4)
- United Team of Germany (4)
- Italy (2)
- Japan (3)
- Norway (4)
- Poland (1)
- Soviet Union (3)
- Switzerland (1)
- United States (3)
