= Dorjgotovyn Pürevloov =

Mongolian cross-country skier (born 1944)

Personal information
- Nationality: Mongolian
- Born: 12 October 1944 (age 82)

Sport
- Sport: Cross-country skiing

Dorjgotovyn Pürevloov (Mongolian: Доржготовын Пүрэвлоов; born 12 October 1944) is a Mongolian former cross-country skier. She competed in two events at the 1964 Winter Olympics but did not place in her entered events. During this, she was the first Mongolian woman to compete at the Olympics. She was awarded the International Master title for her services in sport.

== Biography ==
Dorjgotovyn Pürevloov was born on 12 October 1944. As a cross-country skier, she represented Mongolia in international competition. During her career, Pürevloov was selected to represent Mongolia at the 1964 Winter Olympics held in Seefeld, Austria. This was Mongolia's first appearance at any edition of the Olympic Games. Alongside her participation, she was also the first Mongolian woman to represent the nation at any edition of the Olympics.

She first competed in the women's 10 kilometre event on 1 February 1964 against 34 athletes. There, she recorded a time of 55:03.6 and placed last, placing behind her teammate Jigjeegiin Javzandulam. Four days later on 5 February 1964, Pürevloov then competed in her next event, the women's 5 kilometre event against 31 other competitors. There, she recorded a time of 24:55.8, placing 31st above Gun Ädel of Sweden.

In 2018, a ceremony headed by the Mongolian National Olympic Committee was made to honour retired athletes that have represented Mongolia at past editions of the Olympic Games, specifically at the 1964 Summer Olympics, 1964 Winter Olympics, 1968 Summer Olympics, and 1968 Winter Olympics. Among the honourees was Pürevloov, who was awarded the International Master title for her participation at the 1964 Winter Games.
