= Strutz =

Strutz is a surname. Notable people with the surname include:

- Alvin C. Strutz (1903–1973), American judge
- Gerhard Strutz (1943–1998), Austrian speed skater
- Hermann Strutz (born 1938), Austrian speed skater
- Martina Strutz (born 1981), German pole vaulter
