= Luiro (surname) =

Luiro is a Finnish surname. Notable people with the surname include:

- Tauno Luiro (1932–1955), Finnish ski jumper
- Erkki Luiro (1940–1984), Finnish skier
- Jarkko Luiro (born 1998), Finnish footballer
