= Trzebunia (surname) =

Trzebunia (variant: Trebunia) is a Polish-language surname typical for Goral population of Zakopane region. Notable people with this surname include:

- Bronisław Trzebunia (born 15 September 1941) is a Polish alpine skier
- Teresa Trzebunia (born 23 September 1934) is a Polish cross-country skier
- Maria Trebunia (born 3 May 1956) is a Polish cross-country skier
- Trebunia-Tutka surname of several members of Polish folk musical group Trebunie-Tutki (plural form of the surname)
