= Ingrid Wigernæs =

Norwegian cross-country skier (1928–2023)

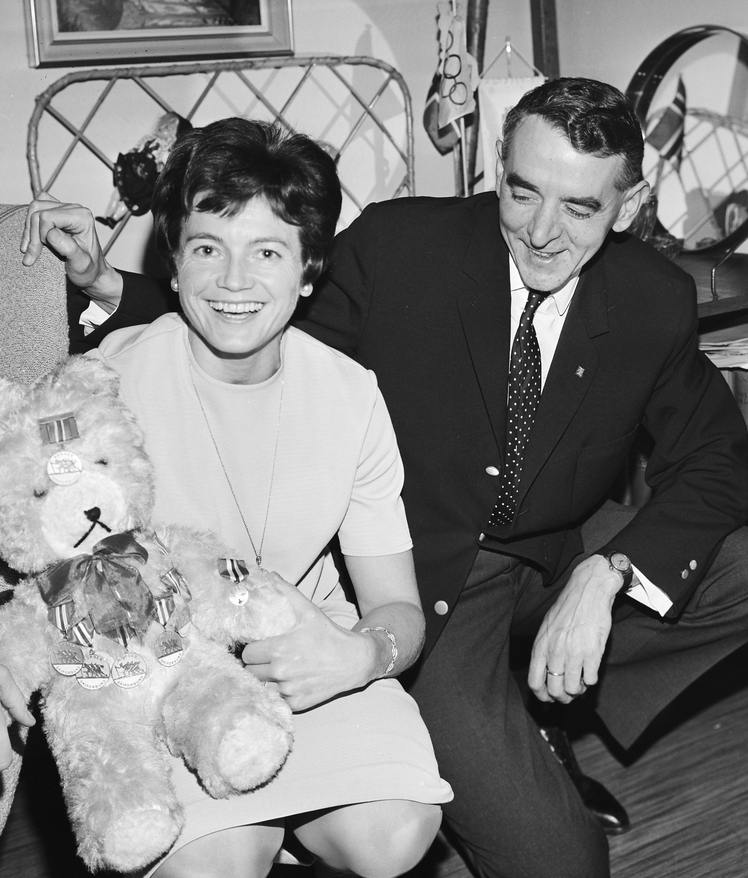
- Ingrid and Leif Wigernæs in 1966

Personal information
- Born: Ingrid Løken; 22 February 1928 Hemsedal, Norway
- Died: 2 December 2023 (aged 95) Hemsedal, Norway

Sport
- Sport: Cross-country skiing
- Club: Romerikslagets IL, Oslo
Medal record
Women's cross-country skiing
Representing Norway
World Championships
Silver medal – second place	1966 Oslo	3 × 5 km relay

Ingrid Wigernæs (née Løken; 22 February 1928 – 2 December 2023) was a Norwegian cross country skier who won a silver medal in the 3 × 5 km relay at the 1966 World Championships. She competed in the 5 km and 10 km events at the 1956 and 1964 Winter Olympics with the best result of 12th place in 1964. Wigernæs died on 2 December 2023, at the age of 95.

== Cross-country skiing results ==
=== Olympic Games ===
Year	Age	5 km	10 km	3 × 5 km relay
1956	28	—N/a	27	—
1964	36	15	12	—

=== World Championships ===
- 1 medal – (1 silver)

Year	Age	5 km	10 km	3 × 5 km relay
1958	30	—N/a	24	7
1966	38	12	13	Silver
