= Stopka (surname) =

Stopka is a surname. Notable people with this surname include:

- Czesława Stopka (1937–2021), Polish cross-country skier
- Józef Stopka (born 1942), Polish biathlete
