= Heiderun Ludwig =

Austrian cross-country skier

Personal information
- Nationality: Austrian
- Born: 18 September 1940 (age 85) Dornbirn, Austria

Sport
- Sport: Cross-country skiing

Heiderun Ludwig (born 18 September 1940) is an Austrian cross-country skier. She competed in two events at the 1964 Winter Olympics.

== Cross-country skiing results ==
=== Olympic Games ===
Year	Age	5 km	10 km	3/ × 5 km relay
1964	23	20	25	—
