= Battistella =

Battistella is a surname. Notable people with the surname include:

- Fanne Foxe (born Annabelle Battistella, 1936–2021), Argentine-American stripper
- Edwin Battistella (born 1955), American linguist
- Gary Battistella (1940–2007), Canadian alpine skier
- Samuele Battistella (born 1998), Italian cyclist
