= Lauri Bergqvist =

Finnish cross-country skier (1930–2022)

Personal information
- Nationality: Finnish
- Born: 20 February 1930 Kouvola, Finland
- Died: 13 December 2022 (aged 92) Kouvola, Finland

Sport
- Sport: Cross-country skiing

Lauri Bergqvist (20 February 1930 – 13 December 2022) was a Finnish cross-country skier. He competed in the men's 50 kilometre event at the 1964 Winter Olympics.

Bergqvist died in Kouvola on 13 December 2022, at the age of 92.

== Cross-country skiing results ==
=== Olympic Games ===
Year	Age	15 km	30 km	50 km	4 × 10 km relay
1964	33	—	—	15	—
