= Yang Yong-ok =

South Korean cross-country skier

Personal information
- Nationality: South Korean
- Born: 4 February 1935 (age 90); Seoul, South Korea

Sport
- Sport: Cross-country skiing

Yang Yong-ok (born 4 February 1935) is a South Korean cross-country skier. He competed in the men's 30 kilometre event at the 1964 Winter Olympics.
