= Stan Fail =

American speed skater

Personal information
- Full name: Stanley Clair Fail
- Nationality: American
- Born: June 11, 1936 Yuma, Colorado, U.S.
- Died: February 28, 2025 (aged 88) Turlock, California, U.S.

Sport
- Sport: Speed skating

Stan Fail (June 11, 1936 – February 28, 2025) was an American speed skater. He competed in the men's 5000 metres event at the 1964 Winter Olympics.

Fail died on February 28, 2025, at the age of 88.
