= Mirja Lehtonen =

Finnish cross-country skier

Medal record

Women's cross-country skiing

Representing Finland

Olympic Games
Silver medal – second place	1964 Innsbruck	5 km
Bronze medal – third place	1964 Innsbruck	3 × 5 km relay

World Championships
Bronze medal – third place	1962 Zakopane	3 × 5 km relay

Mirja Lehtonen (19 October 1942, Uurainen, Central Finland – 25 August 2009) was a cross-country skier from Finland who competed during the early 1960s.

She was born in Kyynämöinen.

She won two medals at the 1964 Winter Olympics in Innsbruck with a silver in the 5 km and a bronze in the 3 × 5 km relay.

Lehtonen also won a bronze medal in the 3 × 5 km relay at the 1962 FIS Nordic World Ski Championships in Zakopane.

== Cross-country skiing results ==
All results are sourced from the International Ski Federation (FIS).

=== Olympic Games ===
- 2 medals – (1 silver, 1 bronze)

Year	Age	5 km	10 km	3 × 5 km relay
1964	21	Silver	10	Bronze

=== World Championships ===
- 1 medal – (1 bronze)

Year	Age	5 km	10 km	3 × 5 km relay
1962	19	5	5	Bronze
