= Franz Scherübl =

Austrian Nordic combined skier

Personal information
- Nationality: Austrian
- Born: 23 November 1940 (age 85) Radstadt, Austria

Sport
- Sport: Nordic combined

Franz Scherübl (born 23 November 1940) is an Austrian former skier. He competed in the Nordic combined event at the 1964 Winter Olympics.
