= Bulgaria at the 1964 Winter Olympics =

- IOC code: BUL
- NOC: Bulgarian Olympic Committee
- Website: www.bgolympic.org (in Bulgarian and English)

in Innsbruck
- Competitors: 7 in 2 sports
- Medals: Gold 0 Silver 0 Bronze 0 Total 0

Winter Olympics appearances (overview)
- 1936; 1948; 1952; 1956; 1960; 1964; 1968; 1972; 1976; 1980; 1984; 1988; 1992; 1994; 1998; 2002; 2006; 2010; 2014; 2018; 2022; 2026; 2030

Bulgaria competed at the 1964 Winter Olympics in Innsbruck, Austria.

== Alpine skiing ==
Men

Athlete	Event	Race	
Athlete	Event	Time	Rank
Petar Angelov	Downhill	2:43.32	60
Petar Angelov	Giant Slalom	2:11.71	49

Men's slalom

Athlete	Qualifying				Final					
Athlete	Time 1	Rank	Time 2	Rank	Time 1	Rank	Time 2	Rank	Total	Rank
Petar Angelov	58.14	41	DNF	–	did not advance					

== Cross-country skiing ==
Men

Event	Athlete	Race	
Event	Athlete	Time	Rank
15 km	Borislav Ochushki	DNF	–
15 km	Stefan Mitkov	57:05.0	43
30 km	Borislav Ochushki	1'44:00.1	49
30 km	Stefan Mitkov	1'42:13.2	37
50 km	Borislav Ochushki	3'08:18.7	32
50 km	Stefan Mitkov	3'01:13.7	25

Women

Event	Athlete	Race	
Event	Athlete	Time	Rank
5 km	Nadezhda Mikhaylova	21:18.9	28
5 km	Nadezhda Vasileva	20:24.2	21
5 km	Krastana Stoeva	19:11.2	13
10 km	Nadezhda Mikhaylova	47:45.2	28
10 km	Krastana Stoeva	47:39.2	26
10 km	Roza Dimova	46:53.1	22
10 km	Nadezhda Vasileva	46:10.8	20

Women's 3 x 5 km relay

Athletes	Race	
Athletes	Time	Rank
Roza Dimova; Nadezhda Vasileva; Krastana Stoeva	1'06:40.4	5
