= Raimo Partanen =

Finnish Nordic combined skier (1940–2023)

Personal information
- Nationality: Finnish
- Born: 9 August 1940; Ruokolahti, Finland
- Died: 6 May 2023 (aged 82)

Sport
- Sport: Nordic combined

Raimo Partanen (9 August 1940 – 6 May 2023) was a Finnish skier. He competed in the Nordic combined event at the 1964 Winter Olympics.
