= Gun Ädel =

Swedish cross-country skier (1938–2021)

Personal information
- Nationality: Swedish
- Born: 14 September 1938 Arbrå, Sweden
- Died: 10 August 2021 (aged 82) Föne, Sweden
- Height: 1.63 m (5 ft 4 in)
- Weight: 52 kg (115 lb)

Sport
- Sport: Cross-country skiing
- Club: Edsbyns IF

Gun Margareta Ädel (married Nilsson) (14 September 1938 – 10 August 2021) was a Swedish cross-country skier. She competed in the 1964 Winter Olympics in Innsbruck Austria.

== Cross-country skiing results ==
=== Olympic Games ===
Year	Age	5 km	10 km	3 × 5 km relay
1964	25	32	17	—
