= Henryk Marek =

Polish cross-country skier

Personal information
- Nationality: Polish
- Born: 8 January 1939 (age 87) Szczyrk, Poland

Sport
- Sport: Cross-country skiing

Henryk Marek (born 8 January 1939) is a Polish cross-country skier. He competed in the men's 30 kilometre event at the 1964 Winter Olympics.
