= Igor Ostashov =

Soviet speed skater

Personal information
- Nationality: Soviet
- Born: May 3, 1937; Arkhangelsk, Russian SFSR, Soviet Union
- Died: April 1, 1998 (aged 60)

Sport
- Sport: Speed skating

Igor Ostashov (3 May 1937 - 1 April 1998) was a Soviet speed skater. He competed in the men's 10,000 metres event at the 1964 Winter Olympics.
