= Fjodor Koltšin =

Estonian Nordic combined skier

Fjodor Koltšin (24 February 1957 – 8 April 2018) was an Estonian skier who represented the Soviet Union at the 1980 Winter Olympics.

Born in Moscow to Alevtina Kolchina and Pavel Kolchin, Fjodor Koltšin attended the University of Tartu. He was married to Laive Poska, with whom he had two children.
