= Peter Büttner =

Swiss speed skater

Personal information
- Nationality: Swiss
- Born: 26 July 1938 (age 86); Zürich, Switzerland

Sport
- Sport: Speed skating

Peter Büttner (born 26 July 1938) is a Swiss speed skater. He competed in the men's 5000 metres event at the 1964 Winter Olympics.
