= Ri Han-soon =

North Korean cross-country skier

Ri Han-Soon
Personal information
- Born: December 17, 1945 (age 79); North Korea

Sport
- Country: North Korea
- Sport: cross-country skiing

Ri Han-Soon (born 17 December 1945) is a former North Korean cross-country skier. She represented North Korea at the 1964 Winter Olympics in the women's 10km cross-country skiing event.
