= Torsten Samuelsson =

Swedish cross-country skier

Personal information
- Nationality: Swedish
- Born: 16 March 1938 (age 87) Transtrand, Dalarna, Sweden

Sport
- Sport: Cross-country skiing

Torsten Samuelsson (born 16 March 1938) is a Swedish cross-country skier. He competed in the 30 km event at the 1964 Winter Olympics.

== Cross-country skiing results ==
All results are sourced from the International Ski Federation (FIS).

=== Olympic Games ===
Year	Age	15 km	30 km	50 km	4 × 10 km relay
1964	25	—	9	—	—
