= Reinhold Seeböck =

Austrian speed skater

Personal information
- Nationality: Austrian
- Born: 15 April 1943 (age 81); Vienna, Austria

Sport
- Sport: Speed skating

Reinhold Seeböck (born 15 April 1943) is an Austrian speed skater. He competed in the men's 5000 metres event at the 1964 Winter Olympics.
