= Jarmila Škodová =

Czech cross-country skier

Personal information
- Nationality: Czech
- Born: 11 July 1943 (age 82) Benetzko, Reichsgau Sudetenland, Germany

Sport
- Sport: Cross-country skiing

Jarmila Škodová (born 11 July 1943) is a Czech former cross-country skier. She competed in three events at the 1964 Winter Olympics.

== Cross-country skiing results ==
=== Olympic Games ===
Year	Age	5 km	10 km	3 × 5 km relay
1964	20	25	27	6

=== World Championships ===
Year	Age	5 km	10 km	3 × 5 km relay
1962	18	—	—	6
