= Muzakhid Khabibulin =

Soviet speed skater

Personal information
- Nationality: Soviet
- Born: 2 September 1933 (age 91); Perm, Russian SFSR, Soviet Union

Sport
- Sport: Speed skating

Muzakhid Khabibulin (born 2 September 1933) is a Soviet speed skater. He competed in the men's 5000 metres event at the 1964 Winter Olympics.
