= Kim Bong-za =

North Korean cross-country skier (born 1943)

Kim Bong-Za
Personal information
- Born: October 19, 1943 (age 81); Hesan, North Korea

Sport
- Country: North Korea
- Sport: cross-country skiing

Kim Bong-Za (born 19 October 1943) is a former North Korean female cross-country skier. She represented North Korea at the 1964 Winter Olympics in the women's 10 km cross-country skiing event.
