= Elfriede Spiegelhauer-Uhlig =

German cross-country skier (1934–2013)

Personal information
- Nationality: German
- Born: 3 September 1934 Pobershau, Germany
- Died: 21 November 2013 (aged 79) Pockau-Lengefeld, Germany

Sport
- Sport: Cross-country skiing

Elfriede Spiegelhauer-Uhlig (3 September 1934 – 21 November 2013) was a German cross-country skier. She competed at the 1956 Winter Olympics and the 1964 Winter Olympics.

== Cross-country skiing results ==
=== Olympic Games ===
Year	Age	5 km	10 km	3 × 5 km relay
1956	21	—N/a	26	7
1964	29	19	16	—

=== World Championships ===
Year	Age	10 km	3 × 5 km relay
1958	23	—	6
