= Nová Ves (Plzeň-South District) =

- Municipality
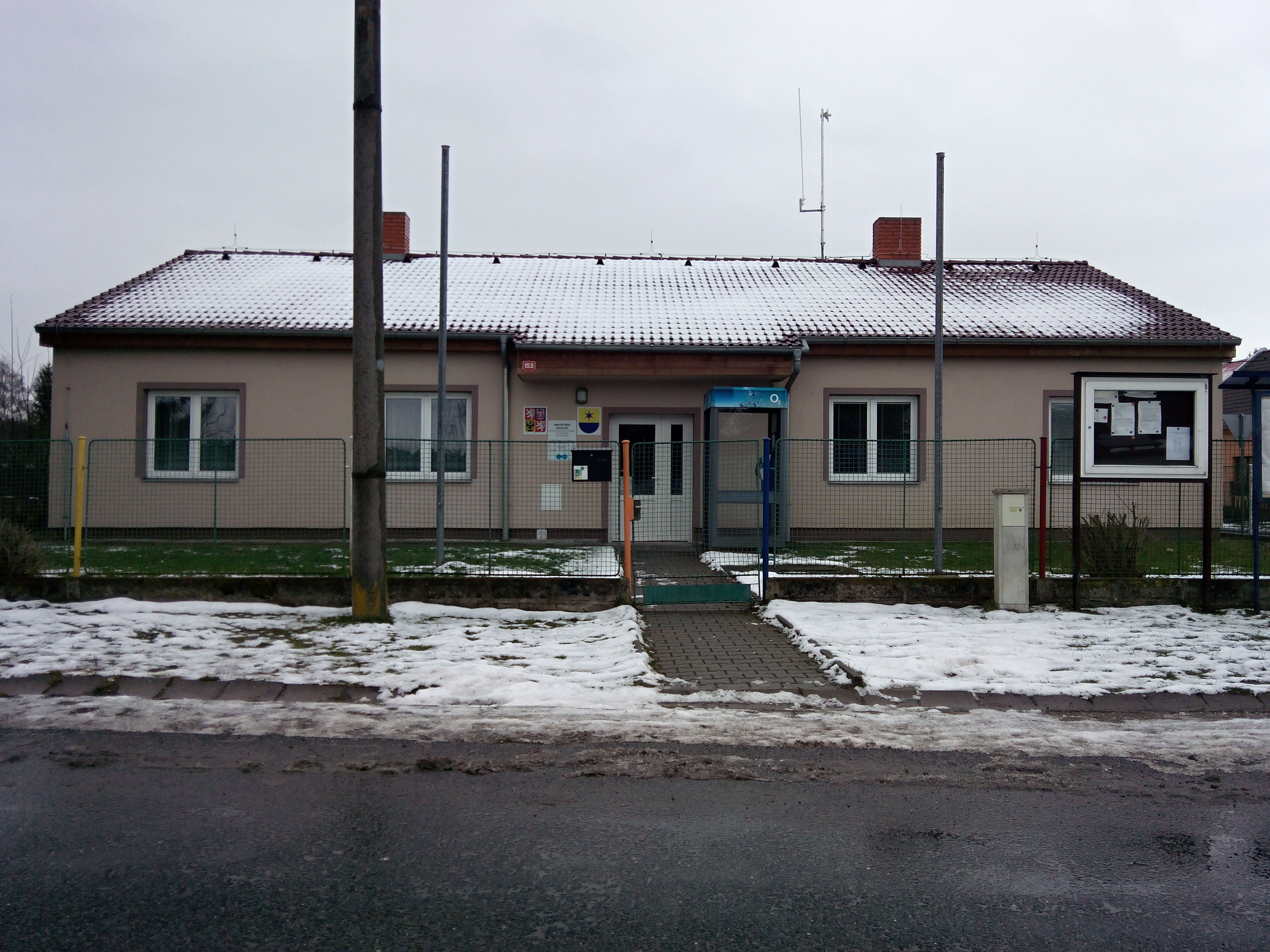
- Municipal office

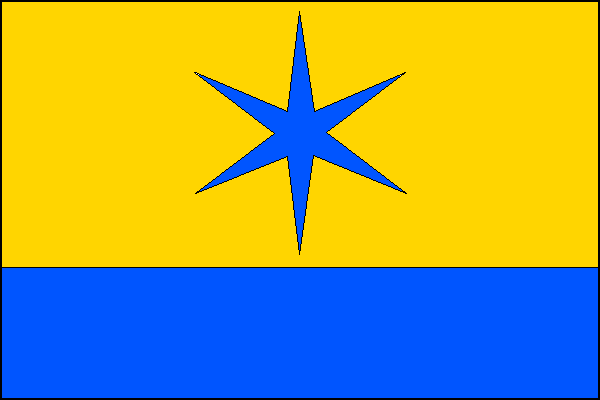
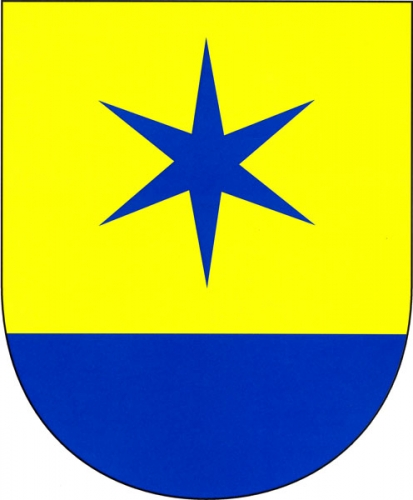
- Flag Coat of arms

- Location in the Czech Republic
- Coordinates: 49°41′10″N 13°17′34″E
- Country: Czech Republic
- Region: Plzeň
- District: Plzeň-South
- First mentioned: 1591

Area
  - Total: 3.99 km^{2} (1.54 sq mi)
- Elevation: 350 m (1,150 ft)

Population (2026-01-01)
  - Total: 294
  - Density: 73.7/km^{2} (191/sq mi)
- Time zone: UTC+1 (CET)
  - Summer (DST): UTC+2 (CEST)
- Postal code: 334 41
- Website: www.obecnovaves.cz

Nová Ves is a municipality and village in Plzeň-South District in the Plzeň Region of the Czech Republic. It has about 300 inhabitants.

Nová Ves lies approximately 10 kilometres (6 mi) south-west of Plzeň and 93 km (58 mi) south-west of Prague.

== Demographics ==
Historical population
Year	Pop.	±%
1869	78	—
1880	350	+348.7%
1890	414	+18.3%
1900	504	+21.7%
1910	552	+9.5%
1921	595	+7.8%
1930	680	+14.3%
1950	430	−36.8%
1961	441	+2.6%
1970	385	−12.7%
1980	269	−30.1%
1991	98	−63.6%
2001	160	+63.3%
2011	278	+73.8%
2021	291	+4.7%
Source: Censuses

== Notable people ==
- Stanislav Sventek (1930–2000), ice hockey player
