= Gordon Currie =

Gordon Currie may refer to:

- Gordon Gray Currie (1923–2017), Canadian politician
- Gordon Currie (actor), Canadian actor
- Gordon Currie (bobsleigh) (born 1933), Canadian bobsledder
