= Stanislav Sventek =

Czech ice hockey player

Medal record

Representing Czechoslovakia

Men's Ice Hockey
Bronze medal – third place	1957 World Championships	
Silver medal – second place	1961 World Championships	
Bronze medal – third place	1963 World Championships	
Bronze medal – third place	1964 Innsbruck Winter Olympics	Team

Stanislav Sventek (9 November 1930 in Nová Ves – 27 October 2000) was an ice hockey player who played for the Czechoslovak national team. He won a bronze medal at the 1964 Winter Olympics. He also won a silver medal at 1961 Ice Hockey World Championships and bronze medals at 1957 and 1963 Ice Hockey World Championships.
