= Stanislav Prýl =

Czech ice hockey player

Personal information
- Born: 23 November 1942 Pardubice, Protectorate of Bohemia and Moravia
- Died: 19 March 2015 (aged 72) Pardubice, Czech Republic

Sport
- Sport: Ice hockey
- Position: Right wing
Medal record
Representing (Czechoslovakia)
Men's Ice Hockey
Bronze medal – third place	1964 Innsbruck	Team

Stanislav Prýl (23 November 1942 – 19 March 2015) was an ice hockey player who played for the Czechoslovak national team. He won a bronze medal at the 1964 Winter Olympics. He was born in Pardubice.
