= Štefan Olekšák =

Slovak Nordic combined skier

Personal information
- Nationality: Slovak
- Born: 16 January 1940; Ždiar, Slovak Republic
- Died: 1 December 1996 (aged 56); Prague, Czech Republic

Sport
- Sport: Nordic combined

Štefan Olekšák (16 January 1940 – 1 December 1996) was a Slovak skier. He competed in the Nordic combined event at the 1964 Winter Olympics.
