= Teresa Trzebunia =

Polish cross-country skier

Personal information
- Nationality: Polish
- Born: 23 September 1934 (age 91) Zakopane, Poland

Sport
- Sport: Cross-country skiing

Teresa Trzebunia (born 23 September 1934) is a Polish cross-country skier. She competed in three events at the 1964 Winter Olympics.

== Cross-country skiing results ==
=== Olympic Games ===
Year	Age	5 km	10 km	3 × 5 km relay
1964	29	23	24	7
