= Štefan Harvan =

Slovak cross-country skier (1937–2007)

Personal information
- Nationality: Slovak
- Born: 17 May 1937 Kežmarske Zlabý, Czechoslovakia
- Died: 9 January 2007 (aged 69) Kežmarok, Slovakia

Sport
- Sport: Cross-country skiing
Medal record
Representing Czechoslovakia
Winter Universiade
| Silver medal – second place | 1960 Chamonix | 4 × 8 km relay |
| Silver medal – second place | 1962 Villars | 4 × 8 km relay |
| Silver medal – second place | 1964 Špindlerův Mlýn | 4 × 8 km relay |

Štefan Harvan (17 May 1937 – 9 January 2007) was a Slovak cross-country skier. He competed in the men's 30 kilometre event at the 1964 Winter Olympics.
