= Alfons Dorner =

German cross-country skier (born 1936)

Personal information
- Nationality: German
- Born: 1 November 1936 (age 88); Viechtach, Germany

Sport
- Sport: Cross-country skiing

Alfons Dorner (born 1 November 1936) is a German cross-country skier. He competed in the men's 30 kilometre event at the 1964 Winter Olympics.
