= Renate Dannhauer-Borges =

German skier (born 1939)

Personal information
- Nationality: German
- Born: 11 August 1939 (age 86) Oberwiesenthal, Germany

Sport
- Sport: Cross-country skiing

Renate Dannhauer-Borges (born 11 August 1939) is a German former cross-country skier. She competed at the 1960 Winter Olympics and the 1964 Winter Olympics.

== Cross-country skiing results ==
=== Olympic Games ===
| Year | Age | 5 km | 10 km | 3 × 5 km relay |
|---|---|---|---|---|
| 1960 | 20 | —N/a | 16 | 5 |
| 1964 | 24 | 15 | 14 | 4 |

=== World Championships ===
| Year | Age | 5 km | 10 km | 3 × 5 km relay |
|---|---|---|---|---|
| 1958 | 18 | —N/a | 31 | — |
| 1962 | 22 | — | — | 5 |
