= Ladislav Šmíd (ice hockey, born 1938) =

Czech ice hockey player

Personal information
- Nationality: Czech
- Born: 24 May 1938 (age 87); Rožmitál pod Třemšínem, Czechoslovakia

Sport
- Sport: Ice hockey

Ladislav Šmíd (born 24 May 1938) is a Czech ice hockey player. He competed in the men's tournament at the 1964 Winter Olympics, winning the bronze medal.
