= Eva Břízová =

Czech cross-country skier

Personal information
- Nationality: Czech
- Born: 15 May 1942 (age 83) Líšnice, Protectorate Bohemia and Moravia

Sport
- Sport: Cross-country skiing

Eva Břízová (born 15 May 1942) is a Czech former cross-country skier. She competed in three events at the 1964 Winter Olympics.

== Cross-country skiing results ==
=== Olympic Games ===
| Year | Age | 5 km | 10 km | 3 × 5 km relay |
|---|---|---|---|---|
| 1964 | 21 | 26 | 29 | 6 |
