= Gerhard Strutz =

Austrian speed skater

Personal information
- Nationality: Austrian
- Born: 2 April 1943
- Died: 3 November 1998 (aged 55)

Sport
- Sport: Speed skating

Gerhard Strutz (2 April 1943 – 3 November 1998) was an Austrian speed skater. He competed in the men's 5000 metres event at the 1964 Winter Olympics.
