= Eva Paulusová-Benešová =

Czech cross-country skier

Personal information
- Nationality: Czech
- Born: 19 February 1937 Jilemnice, Czechoslovakia
- Died: 18 October 2017 (aged 80)

Sport
- Sport: Cross-country skiing

Eva Paulusová-Benešová (19 February 1937 – 18 October 2017) was a Czech cross-country skier. She competed at the 1956 Winter Olympics and the 1964 Winter Olympics.

== Cross-country skiing results ==
=== Olympic Games ===
Year	Age	5 km	10 km	3 × 5 km relay
1956	19	—N/a	28	6
1964	27	22	21	6

=== World Championships ===
Year	Age	5 km	10 km	3 × 5 km relay
1958	21	—N/a	25	5
1962	25	—	—	6
