= Jan Hamřík =

Czech luger (born 1940)

Personal information
- Nationality: Czech
- Born: 3 December 1940 (age 84); Prague, Protectorate of Bohemia and Moravia

Sport
- Sport: Luge

Jan Hamřík (born 3 December 1940) is a Czech luger. He competed at the 1964 Winter Olympics and the 1968 Winter Olympics.
