= Bak Sung-wun =

North Korean speed skater (born 1940)

Personal information
- Nationality: North Korean
- Born: 18 November 1940 (age 84); Hamhung, Korea

Sport
- Sport: Speed skating

Bak Sung-wun (born 18 November 1940) is a North Korean speed skater. He competed in the men's 5000 metres event at the 1964 Winter Olympics.
