= Kim Zin-hook =

North Korean speed skater (born 1940)

Personal information
- Nationality: North Korean
- Born: 1 March 1940 (age 85) Hamhung, Korea

Sport
- Sport: Speed skating

Kim Zin-hook (born 1 March 1940) is a North Korean speed skater. He competed in two events at the 1964 Winter Olympics.
