= Kim Ko-am =

North Korean cross-country skier (born 1943)

Personal information
- Nationality: North Korean
- Born: 14 September 1943 (age 82) Chungsan, North Korea

Sport
- Sport: Cross-country skiing

Kim Ko-am (Korean: 김고암, born 14 September 1943) is a North Korean cross-country skier. He competed in the men's 30 kilometre event at the 1964 Winter Olympics.
