= Czesława Stopka =

Polish cross-country skier (1937–2021)

Personal information
- Nationality: Polish
- Born: 21 December 1937 Zakopane, Poland
- Died: 5 March 2021 (aged 83)

Sport
- Sport: Cross-country skiing

Czesława Stopka (21 December 1937 – 5 March 2021) was a Polish cross-country skier. She competed in three events at the 1964 Winter Olympics.

== Cross-country skiing results ==
=== Olympic Games ===
Year	Age	5 km	10 km	3 × 5 km relay
1964	26	24	23	7
