= Eric Luoma =

Canadian cross-country skier (1929–2018)

Eric Luoma (11 April 1929 – 16 January 2018) was a Canadian cross-country skier who competed in the 1964 Winter Olympics. Luoma was a founding member of the Foothills Nordic Ski Club in Calgary, Alberta (1964).
