= Eiichi Tanaka =

Japanese Nordic combined skier

Personal information
- Nationality: Japanese
- Born: 6 May 1941 (age 83); Hokkaido, Japan

Sport
- Sport: Nordic combined

Eiichi Tanaka (田中 英一, Tanaka Eiichi, born 6 May 1941) is a Japanese skier. He competed in the Nordic combined event at the 1964 Winter Olympics.
