= Karen Dokka =

Canadian alpine skier (born 1947)

Karen Dokka (born 25 January 1947 in Vancouver) is a Canadian former alpine skier who competed in the 1964 Winter Olympics and in the 1968 Winter Olympics.
