= Heidi Mittermaier =

German alpine skier (born 1941)

Personal information
- Nationality: German
- Born: 28 January 1941 (age 85) Munich, Germany

Sport
- Sport: Alpine skiing

Heidi Mittermaier (born 28 January 1941) is a German alpine skier. She competed in two events at the 1964 Winter Olympics.
