= Heinz Seidel =

German cross-country skier

Personal information
- Nationality: German
- Born: 5 July 1931 (age 93); Klingenthal, Germany

Sport
- Sport: Cross-country skiing

Heinz Seidel (born 5 July 1931) is a German cross-country skier. He competed in the men's 30 kilometre event at the 1964 Winter Olympics. He won the 1962 national East Germany 30 km title.
