= Linda Crutchfield-Bocock =

Canadian alpine skier (1942–2026)

Linda Crutchfield-Bocock (3 April 1942 – 23 May 2026) was a Canadian alpine skier and luger who competed in the 1964 Winter Olympics and in the 1968 Winter Olympics. She died on 23 May 2026, at the age of 84.
