= Franz Portmann =

Canadian cross-country skier

Franz Portmann (born September 11, 1931) is a Canadian former cross-country skier who competed in the 1964 Winter Olympics. He was born in Escholzmatt, Lucerne, Switzerland.
