= Jiří Hujer =

Czech luger (born 1941)

Personal information
- Nationality: Czech
- Born: 18 January 1941 (age 84); Bzí, Protectorate of Bohemia and Moravia

Sport
- Sport: Luge

Jiří Hujer (born 18 January 1941) is a Czech luger. He competed in the men's singles and doubles events at the 1964 Winter Olympics.
