= Rita Czech-Blasl =

German cross-country skier (1932–2023)

Rita Czech-Blasel
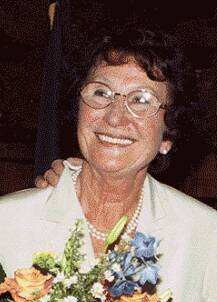
- Rita Czech-Blasel

Personal information
- Nationality: German
- Born: 27 July 1932 Freiburg im Breisgau, Gau Baden, Germany
- Died: 25 March 2023 (aged 90) Freiburg im Breisgau, Baden-Württemberg, Germany
- Height: 174 cm (5 ft 9 in)

Sport
- Sport: Cross-country skiing

Rita Czech-Blasl (27 July 1932 – 25 March 2023) was a German cross-country skier. She competed at the 1956, 1960 and the 1964 Winter Olympics.

Czech-Blasl died in Freiburg im Breisgau on 25 March 2023, at the age of 90.

== Cross-country skiing results ==
=== Olympic Games ===
Year	Age	5 km	10 km	3 × 5 km relay
1956	21	—N/a	10	—
1960	25	—N/a	12	5
1964	29	12	15	4

=== World Championships ===
Year	Age	10 km	3 × 5 km relay
1958	23	19	—
