= Erkki Luiro =

Finnish Nordic combined skier

Personal information
- Nationality: Finnish
- Born: 29 January 1940; Rovaniemi, Finland
- Died: 2 August 1984 (aged 44); Rovaniemi, Finland

Sport
- Sport: Nordic combined

Erkki Luiro (29 January 1940 – 2 August 1984) was a Finnish skier. He competed in the Nordic combined event at the 1964 Winter Olympics.
