= Helmut Weidlich =

German cross-country skier (born 1937)

Personal information
- Nationality: German
- Born: 17 April 1937 (age 87); Klingenthal, Germany

Sport
- Sport: Cross-country skiing

Helmut Weidlich (born 17 April 1937) is a German cross-country skier. He competed at the 1960 Winter Olympics and the 1964 Winter Olympics.
