= Sadao Kikuchi =

Japanese ski jumper

Personal information
- Nationality: Japanese
- Born: 24 July 1933; Hokkaido, Japan
- Died: 10 December 2001 (aged 68)

Sport
- Sport: Ski jumping

Sadao Kikuchi (24 July 1933 - 10 December 2001) was a Japanese ski jumper. He competed at the 1960 Winter Olympics and the 1964 Winter Olympics.
