= Herbert Höfl =

German speed skater

Personal information
- Nationality: German
- Born: 1 March 1941 (age 84); Munich, Germany

Sport
- Sport: Speed skating

Herbert Höfl (born 1 March 1941) is a German speed skater. He competed at the 1964 Winter Olympics and the 1968 Winter Olympics.
