= Horst Möhwald =

German Nordic combined skier

Personal information
- Nationality: German
- Born: 1 June 1938 Černý Důl, Czechoslovakia
- Died: 26 October 2025 (aged 87)

Sport
- Sport: Nordic combined

Horst Möhwald (1 June 1938 – 26 October 2025) was a German skier. He competed in the Nordic combined event at the 1964 Winter Olympics.
