= Miloslav Švaříček =

Czech Nordic combined skier

Personal information
- Nationality: Czech
- Born: 14 February 1942 (age 83); Nové Město na Moravě, Protectorate of Bohemia and Moravia

Sport
- Sport: Nordic combined

Miloslav Švaříček (born 14 February 1942) is a Czech former skier. He competed in the Nordic combined event at the 1964 Winter Olympics.
