= Benecko =

- Municipality
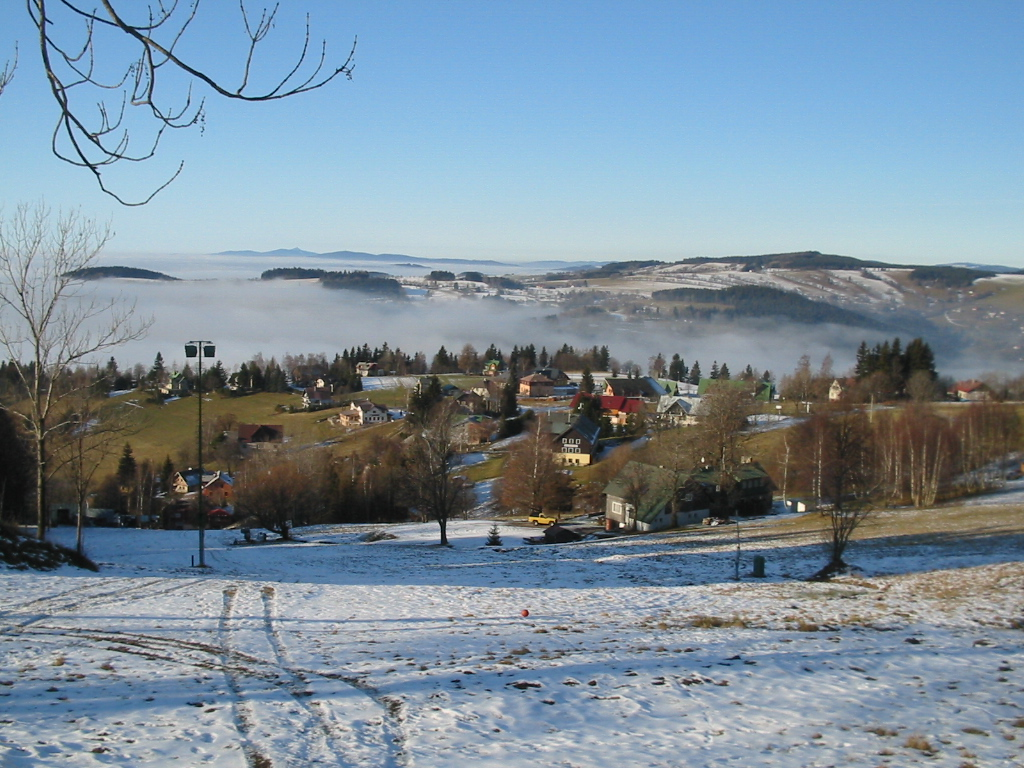
- Panorama of Benecko

- Flag Coat of arms

- Location in the Czech Republic
- Coordinates: 50°39′59″N 15°32′54″E
- Country: Czech Republic
- Region: Liberec
- District: Semily
- First mentioned: 1628

Area
  - Total: 16.53 km^{2} (6.38 sq mi)
- Elevation: 682 m (2,238 ft)

Population (2026-01-01)
  - Total: 1,111
  - Density: 67.21/km^{2} (174.1/sq mi)
- Time zone: UTC+1 (CET)
  - Summer (DST): UTC+2 (CEST)
- Postal codes: 512 37, 514 01
- Website: www.obecbenecko.cz

Benecko (German: Benetzko) is a municipality and village in Semily District in the Liberec Region of the Czech Republic. It has about 1,100 inhabitants. It is a winter tourist resort. The village of Horní Štěpanice with timbered cottages is protected as a village monument reservation.

== Administrative division ==
Benecko consists of eight municipal parts (in brackets population according to the 2021 census):

- Benecko (338)
- Dolní Štěpanice (336)
- Horní Štěpanice (79)
- Mrklov (183)
- Rychlov (39)
- Štěpanická Lhota (75)
- Zákoutí (18)
- Žalý (3)

== Etymology ==
The original name of the village was either Benetsko, which would mean that it is derived from the personal name Benek (meaning "Benek's place/property"), or Benečsko, which would mean that the village was founded on the site of the defunct village of Benetice.

== Geography ==
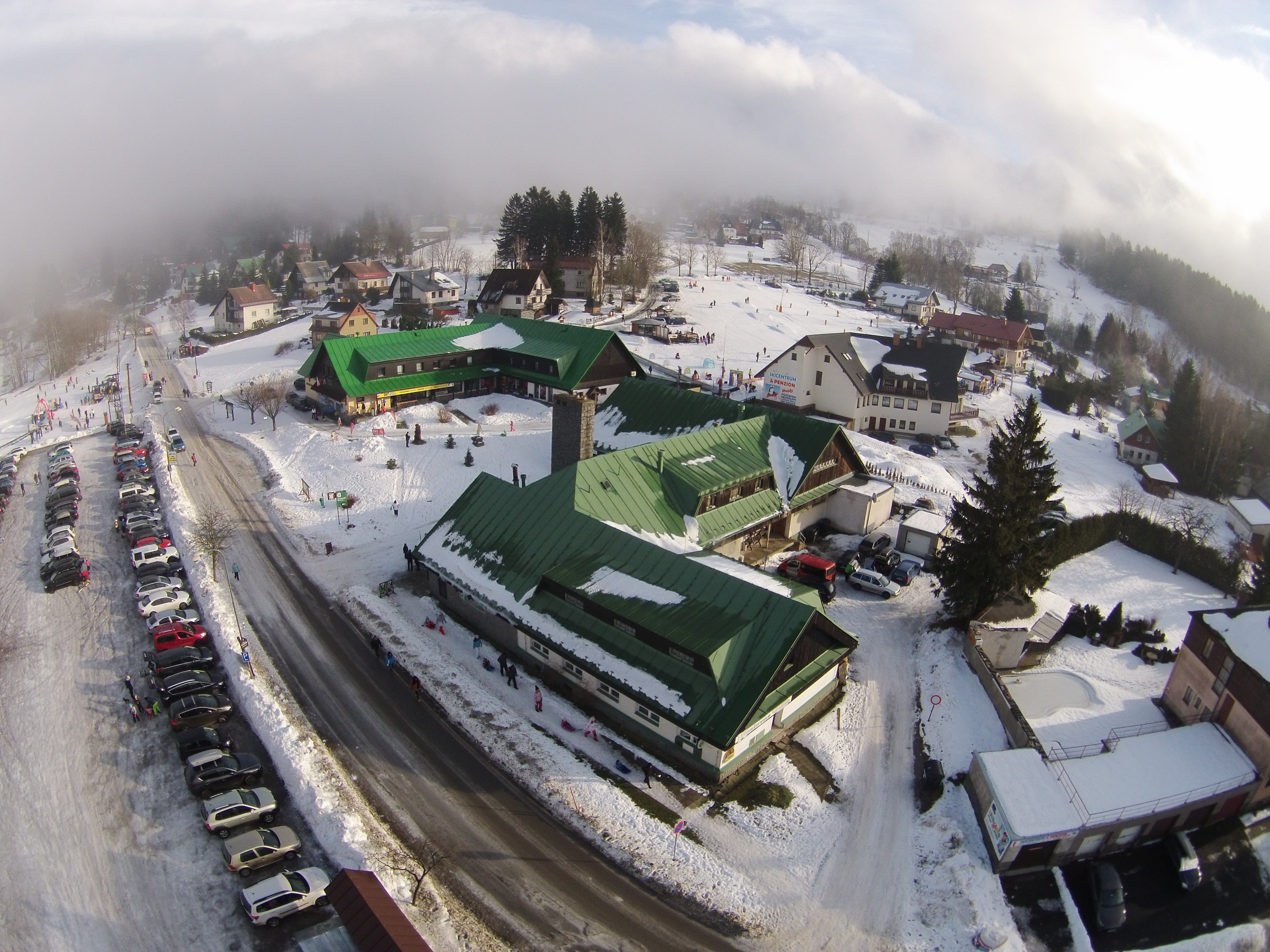
Aerial view of the centre of Benecko

Benecko is located about 34 kilometres (21 mi) southeast of Liberec. It lies in the Giant Mountains. The highest point is the mountain Zadní Žalý at 1,036 m (3,399 ft) above sea level.

== History ==
The area has been site to multiple settlements over time. The first recorded original historical centre of habitation was Horní Štěpanice, a small settlement established near the castle Štěpanice. The first written mention of Horní Štěpanice is from 1304, when the castle was inhabited by Jan of Waldstein. The latest archaeological findings point to older occupation of the site in 1254 by Jindřich of Waldstein. Horní Štěpanice had town status until 1524 when the castle was abandoned.

The first written mention of Benecko is from 1628. The name is said to be derived from a local legend about a hermit of Benedictine order, whose hermitage was located near Jindra rock near the site of the modern Chapel of Saint Hubert.

People settled other areas of the municipality in the 17th–19th centuries and built an economy based on farming, hand weaving and the manufacture of jewellery. At the end of the 19th century, tourism and winter sports were developed, with rich tourists bringing economic wealth and new industries to the area. This development was interrupted by World War II. In the second half of 20th century, most of businesses were nationalised and tourism lessened in importance. The next wave of prosperity started after 1989 with restitution of properties following the Velvet Revolution.

== Demographics ==
Historical population

Year	Pop.	±%
1869	3,183	—
1880	3,125	−1.8%
1890	2,947	−5.7%
1900	2,989	+1.4%
1910	2,884	−3.5%

Year	Pop.	±%
1921	2,389	−17.2%
1930	2,181	−8.7%
1950	2,072	−5.0%
1961	1,365	−34.1%
1970	1,276	−6.5%

Year	Pop.	±%
1980	1,171	−8.2%
1991	1,075	−8.2%
2001	1,141	+6.1%
2011	1,090	−4.5%
2021	1,071	−1.7%

Source: Censuses

== Economy ==
Economic activities of local population were changed many times. Initially, the economy was based on farming and mining. After the coal reserves were exhausted, the people turned to industries like wood mining, glassblowing and textile processing. The current economy of Benecko is mostly oriented towards tourism and related activities. The municipality to home to many hotels, private holiday accommodations, ski schools and equipment rental, with little industry.

== Transport ==
There are no railways or major roads passing through the municipality. Benecko has bus connection with Vrchlabí, Jilemnice and on Friday and Saturday with Prague.

== Culture ==
Despite its remoteness, Benecko has a rich cultural life with amateur theatre and musical associations.

== Sport ==
In the 1960s, the first ski lifts were built in Benecko, the 328-metre (1,076-foot) long Chrudim and 750-metre (2,460-foot) long Kejnos that was replaced in 2006 by modern four-seat ski lift. As of 2021, there are 10 ski lifts from 115 to 800 metres (377 to 2,625 feet) long, mostly for beginners and two skiparks for intermediate.

== Sights ==
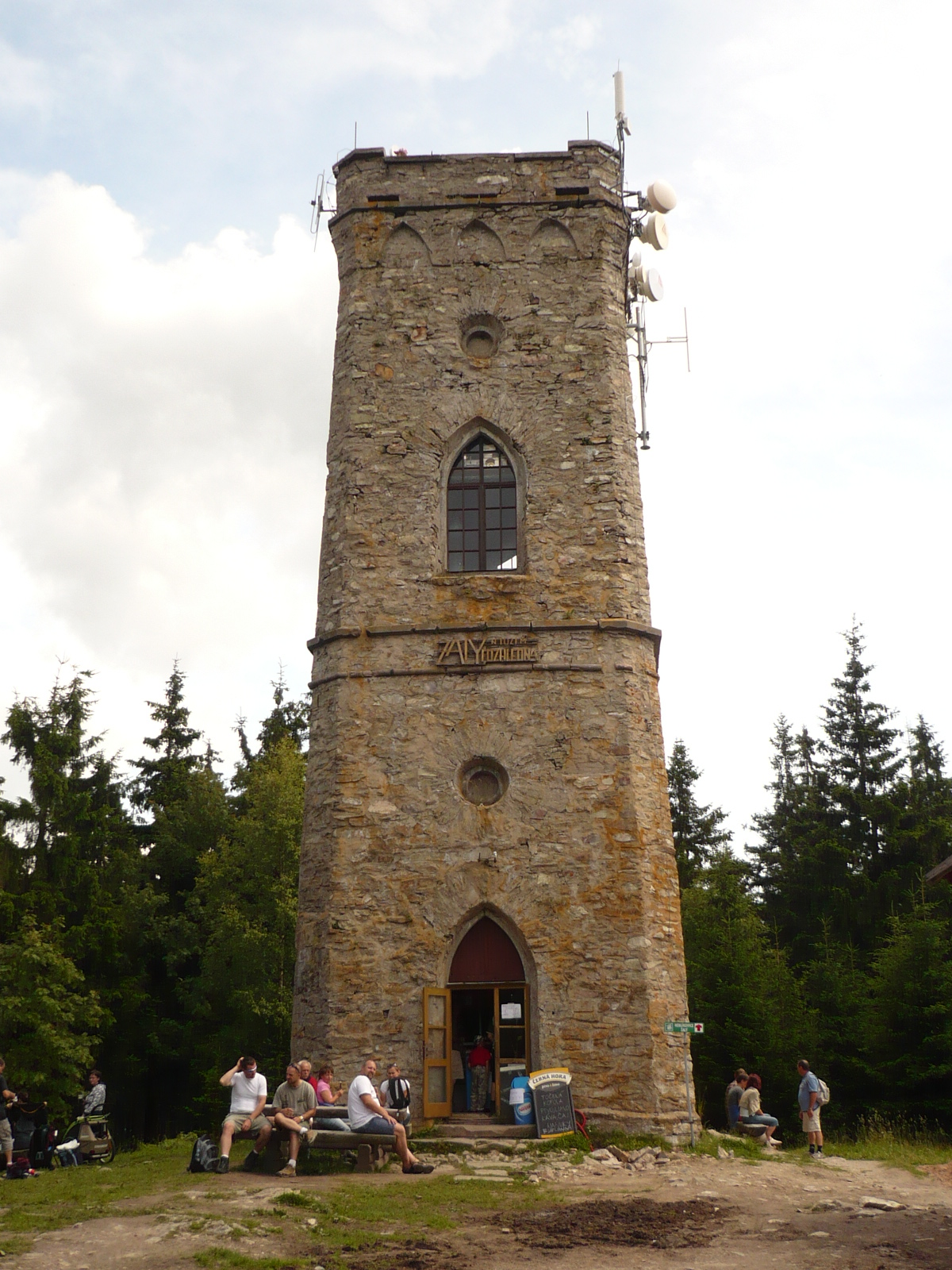
Žalý observation tower

The Church of the Holy Trinity in Horní Štěpanice is a rural parish church built in the Empire style. Its current appearance dates from 1812.

In Dolní Štěpanice, there is a ruin of the Štěpanice Castle. The Gothic castle from the second half of the 13th century was referred to as desolate in 1543. Today, the locality consists of the remains of stone walls with a prismatic bastion.

On the top of the mountain Přední Žalý (at 1,019 metres (3,343 ft) above sea level) is the Žalý observation tower. It is the only stone observation tower in the Giant Mountains. It was built by Count Jan Harrach in 1892. The place is also a pilgrimage site.

== Notable people ==
- Šárka Strachová (born 1985), alpine ski racer, Olympic medalist
