= Erika Heinicke =

German speed skater

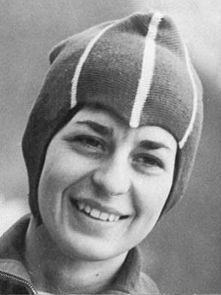
- Erika Heinicke in 1964

Personal information
- Born: 19 December 1939 (age 86) Bad Frankenhausen, Germany
- Height: 1.66 m (5 ft 5 in)
- Weight: 60 kg (130 lb)

Sport
- Sport: Speed skating
- Club: Berliner TSC

Erika Heinicke (born 19 December 1939) is a retired German speed skater. She competed at the 1964 Winter Olympics in the 1000, 1500 and 3000 m events and finished in 23rd, 28th and 28th place, respectively.

Personal bests:

- 500 m – 49.4 (1966)
- 1000 m – 1:40.5 (1965)
- 1500 m – 2:32.9 (1966)
- 3000 m – 5:28.7 (1966)
