= Josef Kutheil =

Czech Nordic combined skier (1939–2025)

Personal information
- Nationality: Czech
- Born: 17 April 1939; Stříbřec, Protectorate of Bohemia and Moravia
- Died: 18 August 2025 (aged 86)

Sport
- Sport: Nordic combined

Josef Kutheil (17 April 1939 – 18 August 2025) was a Czech skier. He competed in the Nordic combined event at the 1964 Winter Olympics. Kutheil died on 18 August 2025, at the age of 86.
