= Faye Strutt =

Canadian pair skater

Faye Strutt (born September 25, 1947 in Vancouver, British Columbia) is a Canadian former pair skater. With partner Jim Watters, she won the bronze medal at the Canadian Figure Skating Championships in 1964 and 1965 and competed at the 1964 Winter Olympics in Innsbruck, Austria.

== Results ==
Mixed pairs, partnered with Jim Watters:

Event	1964	1965
Winter Olympic Games	14th	
Canadian Championships	3rd	3rd
