= Inge Lieckfeldt =

German speed skater

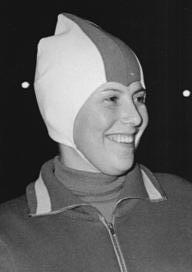
- Inge Lieckfeldt in 1967

Personal information
- Nationality: German
- Born: 4 October 1941 (age 83); Stettin, Germany

Sport
- Sport: Speed skating

Inge Lieckfeldt (born 4 October 1941) is a German speed skater. She competed in two events at the 1964 Winter Olympics.
