= Ri Sung-ryool =

North Korean speed skater

Personal information
- Nationality: North Korean
- Born: 5 December 1942 (age 83) Chungsan, Korea

Sport
- Sport: Speed skating

Ri Sung-ryool (born 5 December 1942, Korean: 리성률) is a North Korean speed skater. He competed in two events at the 1964 Winter Olympics.
