= Yang Duk-soon =

North Korean cross-country skier

Personal information
- Nationality: North Korean
- Born: 22 October 1933 (age 91)

Sport
- Sport: Cross-country skiing

Yang Duk-soon (born 22 October 1933,Korean: 양덕순) is a North Korean cross-country skier. He competed in the men's 30 kilometre event at the 1964 Winter Olympics.
