= Chogoro Yahata =

Japanese cross-country skier (born 1943)

Personal information
- Nationality: Japanese
- Born: 10 January 1943 (age 82); Iwate, Japan

Sport
- Sport: Cross-country skiing

Chogoro Yahata (八幡 長五郎, Yahata Chōgorō, born 10 January 1943) is a Japanese cross-country skier. He competed in the men's 15 kilometre event at the 1964 Winter Olympics.
