= Katalin Hemrik =

Hungarian cross-country skier (1941–1988)

Personal information
- Nationality: Hungarian
- Born: 18 November 1941; Budapest, Hungary
- Died: 8 March 1988 (aged 46); Budapest, Hungary

Sport
- Sport: Cross-country skiing

Katalin Hemrik (18 November 1941 – 8 March 1988) was a Hungarian cross-country skier. She competed in two events at the 1964 Winter Olympics.
