= Ralf Olin =

Canadian speed skater

Personal information
- Full name: Ralf Emil Olin
- Nationality: Canadian
- Born: April 12, 1925 Seattle, Washington, United States
- Died: May 25, 2007 (aged 82) Victoria, British Columbia, Canada

Sport
- Country: Canada
- Sport: Speed skating

Ralf Emil Olin (April 12, 1925 – May 25, 2007) was an American-born speed skater who represented Canada at the Olympics. Olin competed in four Olympic Games - 1952, 1956, 1960 and 1964. His best result was a 15th-place finish in the 10,000 meters in 1964. He was the Canadian flag bearer in the 1964 Winter Olympics. He was born in Seattle, Washington.

In December 1962, he conducted the Canadian national team during a six-week training project in Sweden.
