= Tatsuo Kitamura =

Japanese cross-country skier (born 1940)

Personal information
- Nationality: Japanese
- Born: 10 January 1940 (age 86) Nagano, Japan

Sport
- Sport: Cross-country skiing

Tatsuo Kitamura (北村 辰夫, Kitamura Tatsuo; born 10 January 1940) is a Japanese cross-country skier. He competed in the men's 15 kilometre event at the 1964 Winter Olympics.
