= Gerald Koning =

Canadian speed skater

Personal information
- Nationality: Canadian
- Born: 28 March 1933 (age 91); Avenhorn, Netherlands

Sport
- Sport: Speed skating

Gerald Koning (born 28 March 1933) also called Gerry or Jerry is a Canadian speed skater.

Born in the Netherlands, he emigrated in 1954 and then lived in Calgary, Alberta, Canada. In January 1962, Gerry competed in the Canadian Speed Skating Championships, held in Broadview Park in Calgary, where he won the 10,000m race, finishing second in the overall competition.

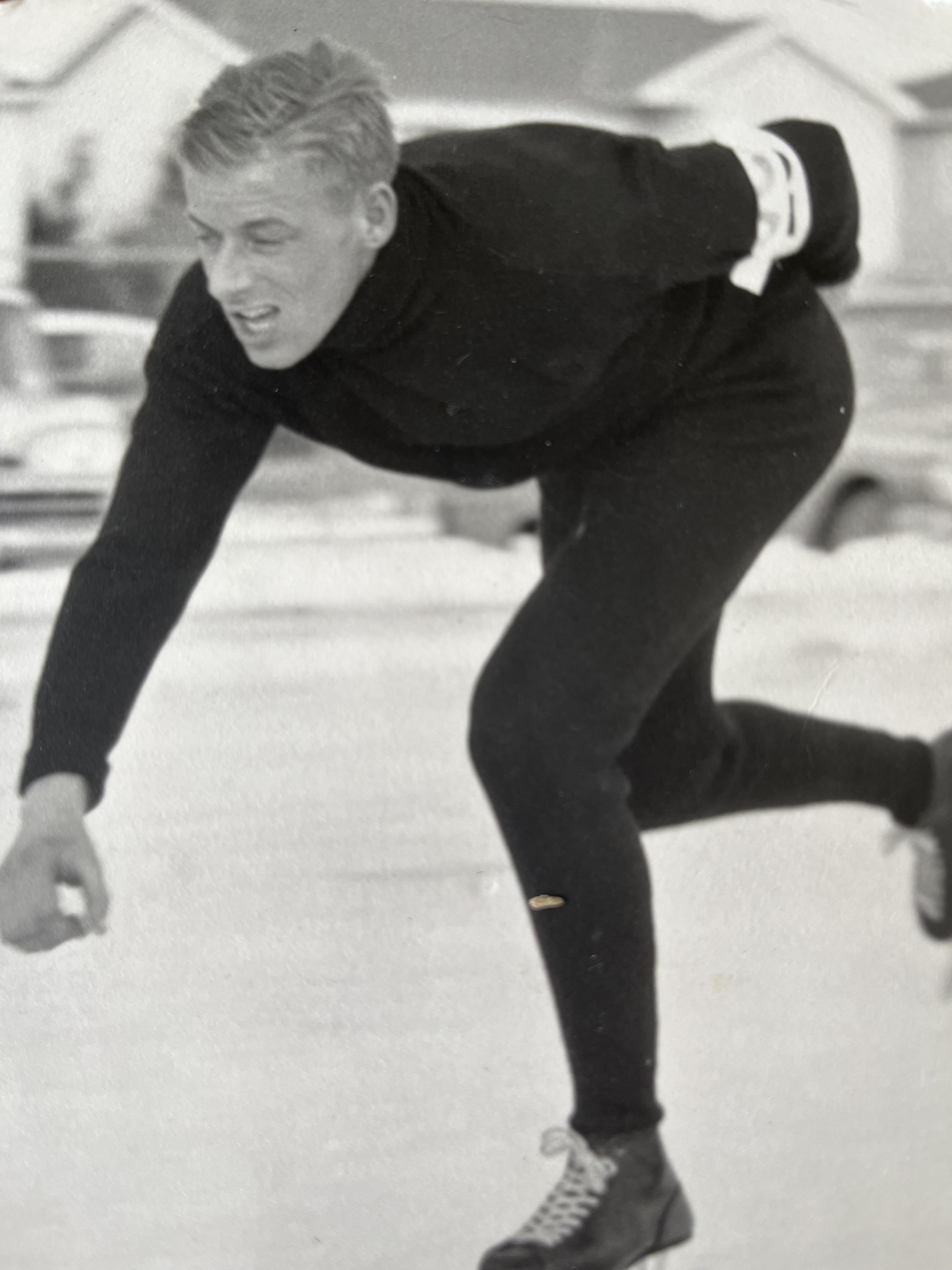
Gerald skating in Broadview Park, 10000m race, 1962.

In December 1962, he went to Europe as part of the national team composing of eight Canadian speed skaters, for a six-week training project in Davos, Switzerland. In 1963, Gerry competed in the Eastern Division National Championships in St.Catharines, Ontario, and in the Canadian Championships in Saskatoon, Saskatchewan. In December 1963 Gerry was named to the Olympic team, and he competed in two events (1500m with a time of 2:24.8, and 5000m with a time of 8:26.9) at the 1964 Winter Olympics.

Gerry continued to speed skate afterwards, notably at the1965 Canadian Speed Skating Championships in Winnipeg. His winning time in the 10000m race was 18:06, and his time in the 5000m race was 8:44.9.
