= Jürgen Schmidt =

German speed skater

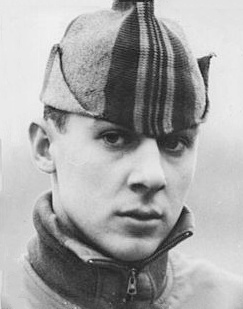
- Jürgen Schmidt in 1964

Personal information
- Born: 11 July 1941 (age 84) Berlin, Germany
- Height: 1.72 m (5 ft 8 in)
- Weight: 71 kg (157 lb)

Sport
- Sport: Speed skating
- Club: Berliner TSC

Jürgen Schmidt (born 11 July 1941) is a retired German speed skater. In 1964 he won three national titles, in 5000 m, 10000 m and all-around, and was selected for the 1964 Winter Olympics, where he finished in 39th place in the 1500 m and 5000 m events.

Personal bests:

- 500 m – 43.6 (1964)
- 1500 m – 2:14.5 (1964)
- 5000 m – 8:16.3 (1964)
- 10000 m – 17:04.6 (1964)
