= Martti Rautio =

Canadian cross-country skier

Martti Rautio (9 March 1935 in Uusimaa, Finland – 13 December 2017) was a Canadian cross-country skier who competed in the 1964 Winter Olympics.
