= Stefan Mitkov =

Bulgarian cross-country skier (born 1933)

Personal information
- Nationality: Bulgarian
- Born: 16 June 1933 (age 91)

Sport
- Sport: Cross-country skiing

Stefan Mitkov (Bulgarian: Стефан Митков; born 16 June 1933) is a Bulgarian cross-country skier. He competed at the 1960 Winter Olympics and the 1964 Winter Olympics.
