= Gary Battistella =

Canadian alpine skier (1940–2007)

Gary Battistella (13 January 1940 – 12 December 2007) was a Canadian alpine skier who competed in the 1964 Winter Olympics.
