= Oldřich Teplý =

Czech speed skater

Personal information
- Nationality: Czech
- Born: 27 May 1940 (age 86) Prague, Protectorate of Bohemia and Moravia

Sport
- Sport: Speed skating

Oldřich Teplý (born 27 May 1940) is a Czech speed skater. He competed in three events at the 1964 Winter Olympics.
