= Éva Balázs =

Hungarian cross-country skier (1942–1992)

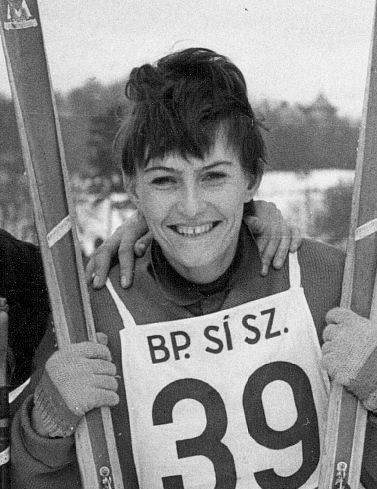
- Éva Balázs in 1967

Personal information
- Nationality: Hungarian
- Born: 21 September 1942; Budapest, Hungary
- Died: 6 January 1992 (aged 49); Karcag, Hungary

Sport
- Sport: Cross-country skiing

Éva Balázs (21 September 1942 – 6 January 1992) was a Hungarian cross-country skier. She competed at the 1964 Winter Olympics and the 1968 Winter Olympics.
