= Donald MacLeod (cross-country skier) =

Canadian cross-country skier

Donald MacLeod (26 January 1938 – 4 January 2015) was a Canadian cross-country skier who competed in the 1964 Winter Olympics.
