= Mária Tarnai =

Hungarian cross-country skier (born 1941)

Personal information
- Nationality: Hungarian
- Born: 8 December 1941 (age 83); Szőny, Hungary

Sport
- Sport: Cross-country skiing

Mária Tarnai (born 8 December 1941) is a Hungarian cross-country skier. She competed in two events at the 1964 Winter Olympics.
