= Ladislav Hrubý =

Czech cross-country skier

Personal information
- Nationality: Czech
- Born: 22 November 1934 (age 90); Horní Branná, Czechoslovakia

Sport
- Sport: Cross-country skiing

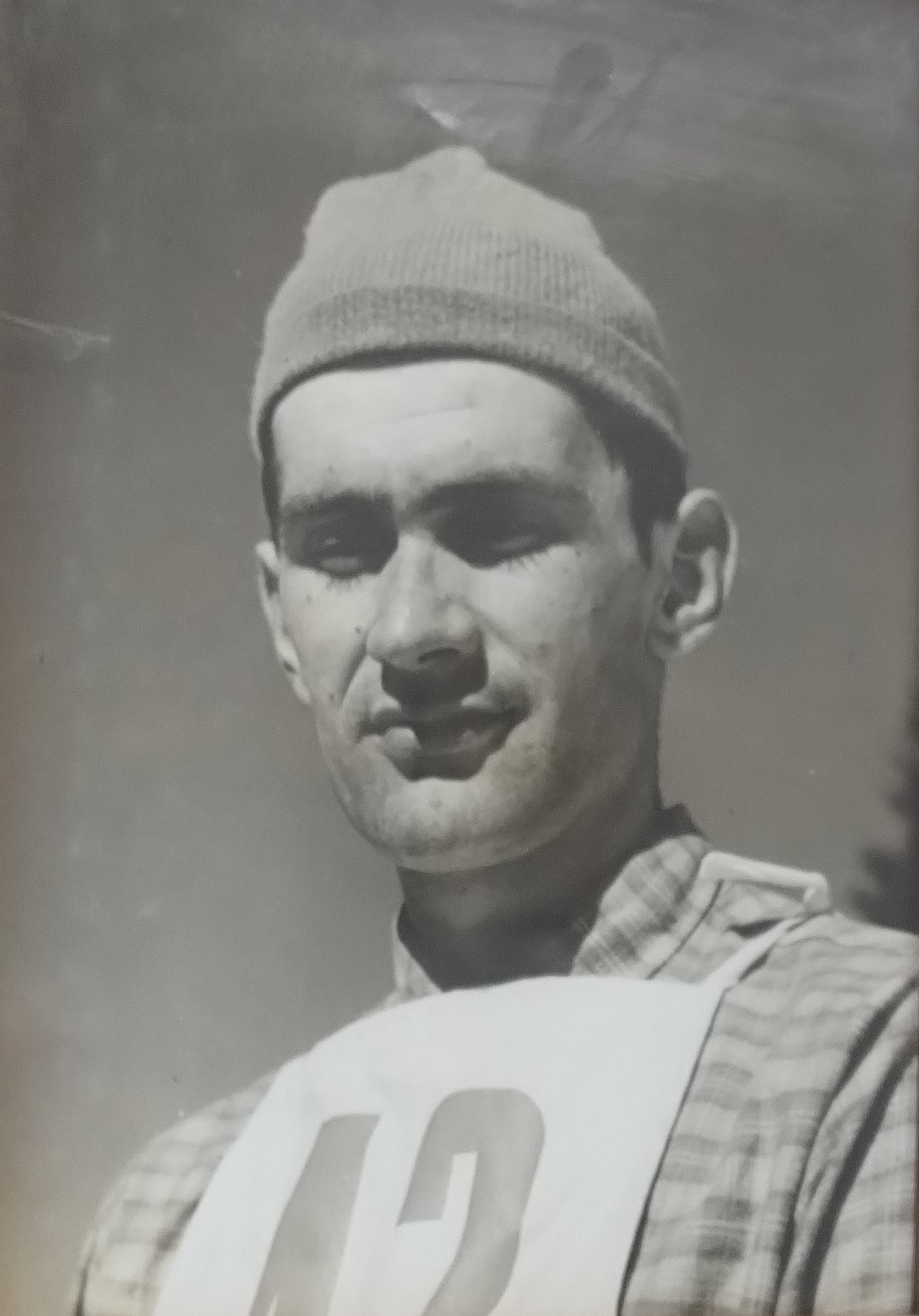
Ladislav Hrubý

Ladislav Hrubý (born 22 November 1934) is a Czech cross-country skier. He competed in the men's 15 kilometre event at the 1964 Winter Olympics.
