= Hidezo Takahashi =

Japanese cross-country skier (born 1934)

Personal information
- Nationality: Japanese
- Born: 22 May 1934 (age 90); Niigata, Japan

Sport
- Sport: Cross-country skiing

Hidezo Takahashi (高橋 秀蔵, Takahashi Hidezō, born 22 May 1934) is a Japanese cross-country skier. He competed in the men's 15 kilometre event at the 1964 Winter Olympics.
