= Borislav Ochushki =

Bulgarian cross-country skier (born 1934)

Personal information
- Nationality: Bulgarian
- Born: 18 April 1934 (age 90)

Sport
- Sport: Cross-country skiing

Borislav Ochushki (Bulgarian: Борислав Очушки; born 18 April 1934) is a Bulgarian cross-country skier. He competed in the men's 15 kilometre event at the 1964 Winter Olympics.
