= Yoshihiro Kawano (speed skater) =

Japanese speed skater (born 1943)

Personal information
- Nationality: Japanese
- Born: 4 October 1943 (age 81); Hokkaido, Japan

Sport
- Sport: Speed skating

Yoshihiro Kawano (born 4 October 1943) is a Japanese speed skater. He competed in two events at the 1964 Winter Olympics.
