= Nadezhda Mikhaylova =

Bulgarian cross-country skier (born 1934)

Personal information
- Nationality: Bulgarian
- Born: 10 October 1934 (age 90); Pernik, Bulgaria

Sport
- Sport: Cross-country skiing

Nadezhda Mikhaylova (Bulgarian: Надежда Михайлова, born 10 October 1934) is a Bulgarian cross-country skier. She competed in two events at the 1964 Winter Olympics.
