= Toyofumi Aruga =

Japanese speed skater (born 1942)

Personal information
- Nationality: Japanese
- Born: 16 November 1942 (age 83) Hokkaido, Japan

Sport
- Sport: Speed skating

Toyofumi Aruga (born 16 November 1942) is a Japanese speed skater. He competed in three events at the 1964 Winter Olympics.
