= Jigjeegiin Javzandulam =

Mongolian cross-country skier (born 1944)

Personal information
- Nationality: Mongolian
- Born: 17 September 1944 (age 80)

Sport
- Sport: Cross-country skiing

Jigjeegiin Javzandulam (born 17 September 1944) is a Mongolian cross-country skier. She competed in two events at the 1964 Winter Olympics.
