= Günter Traub =

German speed skater

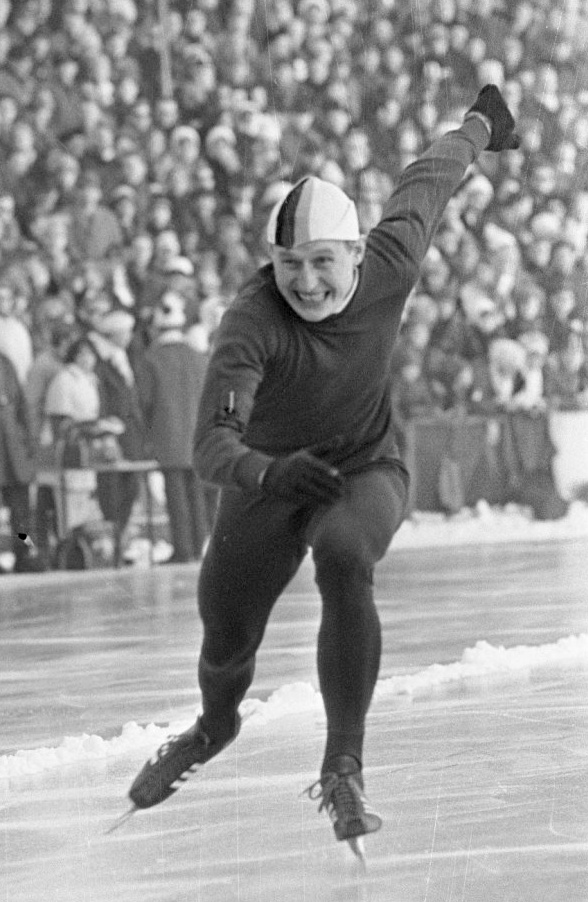
- Günter Traub in 1967

Personal information
- Born: 13 March 1939 (age 87) Schweinfurt, Germany
- Height: 1.82 m (6 ft 0 in)
- Weight: 77 kg (170 lb)

Sport
- Sport: Speed skating
- Club: DEC Frillensee, Inzell

Günter Traub (born 13 March 1939) is a German speed skater. He competed in all speed skating events at the 1964 and 1968 Winter Olympics. His best achievement was 11th place in the 5000 m in 1964 and in 10000 m in 1968. During his career, Traub set two point-scoring world records in all-around speed skating, in 1963 and in 1968. He also won four national all-around titles, in 1961–1963 and 1968.

From 1969 to 1970 he coached the United States speed skating team, which included Peter Mueller, Dianne Holum and Eric Heiden. He ended his skating career in 1970 after a serious training accident in a swimming pool, which brought him into a coma and resulted in multiple fractures. After recovery, he prepared the Italian skating team to the 1972 Winter Olympics. In 1972 Traub joined the motorsport and has been a fitness trainer of the Ford car racing team, which included Jackie Stewart, Niki Lauda, Jochen Mass and Hans-Joachim Stuck.

In 1999, he resumed competing in speed skating and became world champion in his age group, setting a new world record. He proceeded to win world titles in 2000 and 2002, setting a total of seven world records in the age group over 60 years.

Traub now lives in St. Moritz, Switzerland, where he works as a physical education and mental trainer. He consulted such individuals as Juan Carlos of Spain, Michael Schumacher and Hubert Burda. In 1990, he had a cameo appearance in the German sports film Fire, Ice and Dynamite.

Personal bests:

- 500 m – 40.7 (1968)
- 1000 m – 1:21.3 (1968)
- 1500 m – 2:03.8 (1968)
- 5000 m – 7:38.6 (1968)
- 10000 m – 15:42.6 (1968)
