= Satoshi Shinpo =

Japanese speed skater (born 1941)

Personal information
- Nationality: Japanese
- Born: 26 October 1941 (age 84) Hokkaido, Japan

Sport
- Sport: Speed skating

Satoshi Shinpo (born 26 October 1941) is a Japanese speed skater. He competed in four events at the 1964 Winter Olympics.
