= Kim Choon-bong =

North Korean speed skater (born 1941)

Personal information
- Nationality: North Korean
- Born: 15 March 1941 (age 84); Pyongyang, Korea

Sport
- Sport: Speed skating

Kim Choon-bong (born 15 March 1941) is a North Korean speed skater. He competed in two events at the 1964 Winter Olympics.
