= Krastana Stoeva =

Bulgarian cross-country skier (1941–2004)

Personal information
- Nationality: Bulgarian
- Born: 3 January 1941 Smolyan, Bulgaria
- Died: 24 July 2004 (aged 63)

Sport
- Sport: Cross-country skiing

Krastana Stoeva (Bulgarian: Кръстана Стоева, 3 January 1941 –24 July 2004) was a Bulgarian cross-country skier. She competed at the 1960 Winter Olympics and the 1964 Winter Olympics.
