= Switzerland at the 1964 Winter Olympics =

- IOC code: SUI
- NOC: Swiss Olympic Association
- Website: www.swissolympic.ch (in German and French)

in Innsbruck
- Competitors: 72 (60 men, 12 women) in 10 sports
- Flag bearer: Hans Ammann (cross-country)
- Medals: Gold 0 Silver 0 Bronze 0 Total 0

Winter Olympics appearances (overview)
- 1924; 1928; 1932; 1936; 1948; 1952; 1956; 1960; 1964; 1968; 1972; 1976; 1980; 1984; 1988; 1992; 1994; 1998; 2002; 2006; 2010; 2014; 2018; 2022; 2026

Switzerland competed at the 1964 Winter Olympics in Innsbruck, Austria.

None of the 72 athletes won a medal. It was the first and only time (as of Pyeongchang 2018) that Switzerland didn't win a single medal at Winter Olympics.

== Alpine skiing ==
Men

Athlete	Event	Race	
Athlete	Event	Time	Rank
Georges Grünenfelder	Downhill	2:22.69	18
Dumeng Giovanoli	Downhill	2:21.16	13
Willy Favre	Downhill	2:20.23	8
Jos Minsch	Downhill	2:19.54	4
Edy Bruggmann	Giant Slalom	1:55.30	19
Beat von Allmen	Giant Slalom	1:54.05	14
Jos Minsch	Giant Slalom	1:50.61	9
Willy Favre	Giant Slalom	1:48.69	4

Men's slalom

Athlete	Qualifying				Final					
Athlete	Time 1	Rank	Time 2	Rank	Time 1	Rank	Time 2	Rank	Total	Rank
Jos Minsch	54.95	22 QF	–	–	1:15.07	23	DSQ	–	DSQ	–
Willy Favre	54.29	15 QF	–	–	1:13.63	12	1:04.59	17	2:18.22	14
Stefan Kälin	53.93	12 QF	–	–	1:13.92	15	1:02.12	9	2:16.04	10
Adolf Mathis	53.41	6 QF	–	–	1:10.77	5	1:02.22	10	2:12.99	6

Women

Athlete	Event	Race 1		Race 2		Total	
Athlete	Event	Time	Rank	Time	Rank	Time	Rank
Ruth Adolf	Downhill					2:02.59	20
Theres Obrecht	Downhill					2:02.41	19
Heidi Obrecht	Downhill					2:02.23	17
Françoise Gay	Giant Slalom					1:57.21	15
Ruth Adolf	Giant Slalom					1:55.83	12
Theres Obrecht	Giant Slalom					1:54.91	11
Fernande Bochatay	Giant Slalom					1:54.59	9
Fernande Bochatay	Slalom	DNF	–	–	–	DNF	–
Theres Obrecht	Slalom	1:02.56	32	51.53	14	1:54.09	25
Heidi Obrecht	Slalom	47.37	15	51.96	16	1:39.33	14
Françoise Gay	Slalom	45.78	8	53.22	18	1:39.00	13

== Biathlon ==
Men

Event	Athlete	Time	Misses	Adjusted time ^{1}	Rank
20 km	Peter Gerig	1'30:32.5	16	2'02:32.5	48
20 km	Willy Junod	1'28:00.7	13	1'54:00.7	47
20 km	Erich Schönbächler	1'29:59.5	12	1'53:59.5	46
20 km	Marcel Vogel	1'29:14.1	12	1'53:14.1	45

^{1} Two minutes added per miss.

== Bobsleigh ==
Sled	Athletes	Event	Run 1		Run 2		Run 3		Run 4		Total	
Sled	Athletes	Event	Time	Rank	Time	Rank	Time	Rank	Time	Rank	Time	Rank
SUI-1	Hans Zoller; Robert Zimmermann	Two-man	1:06.97	12	1:06.20	6	1:07.60	16	1:07.38	13	4:28.15	10
SUI-2	Herbert Kiesel; Oskar Lory	Two-man	1:07.33	14	1:07.70	14	1:07.92	17	1:08.25	16	4:31.20	17

Sled	Athletes	Event	Run 1		Run 2		Run 3		Run 4		Total	
Sled	Athletes	Event	Time	Rank	Time	Rank	Time	Rank	Time	Rank	Time	Rank
SUI-1	Hans Zoller; Hans Kleinpeter; Fritz Lüdi; Robert Zimmermann	Four-man	1:04.83	16	1:04.52	12	1:04.97	11	1:04.73	9	4:19.05	10
SUI-2	Herbert Kiesel; Bernhard Wild; Hansruedi Beugger; Oskar Lory	Four-man	1:04.33	9	1:04.54	13	1:04.65	10	1:04.60	8	4:18.12	8

== Cross-country skiing ==
Men

Event	Athlete	Race	
Event	Athlete	Time	Rank
15 km	Konrad Hischier	56:42.3	40
15 km	Franz Kälin	55:50.3	32
15 km	Hans-Sigfrid Oberer	55:47.9	31
15 km	Hans Ammann	55:44.9	29
30 km	Alphonse Baume	1'42:41.8	43
30 km	Georges Dubois	1'42:26.8	39
30 km	Hans Ammann	1'39:55.7	28
30 km	Konrad Hischier	1'39:43.6	27
50 km	Georges Dubois	3'07:21.8	31
50 km	Franz Kälin	3'06:09.3	29
50 km	Alphonse Baume	3'03:49.1	26
50 km	Alois Kälin	2'56:30.5	20

Men's 4 × 10 km relay

Athletes	Race	
Athletes	Time	Rank
Konrad Hischier; Alois Kälin; Franz Kälin; Hans Sigfrid Oberer	2'31:52.8	9

== Figure skating ==
Men

Athlete	CF	FS	Points	Places	Rank
Peter Grütter	24	20	1517.2	208	24
Markus Germann	20	23	1578.0	186	19

Women

Athlete	CF	FS	Points	Places	Rank
Monika Zingg	28	28	1568.9	248	27

Pairs

Athletes	Points	Places	Rank
Monique Mathys; Yves Ällig	81.5	147.5	17
Gerda Johner; Rüdi Johner	95.4	56	6

== Ice hockey ==
=== First round ===
Winners (in bold) qualified for the Group A to play for 1st-8th places. Teams, which lost their qualification matches, played in Group B for 9th-16th places.

Team 1	Score	Team 2
**Switzerland**	5–1	Norway

=== Medal round ===
First place team wins gold, second silver and third bronze.

Rank	Team	Pld	W	L	T	GF	GA	Pts
1	Soviet Union	7	7	0	0	54	10	14
2	Sweden	7	5	2	0	47	16	10
3	Czechoslovakia	7	5	2	0	38	19	10
4	Canada	7	5	2	0	32	17	10
5	United States	7	2	5	0	29	33	4
6	Finland	7	2	5	0	10	31	4
7	Germany	7	2	5	0	13	49	4
8	Switzerland	7	0	7	0	9	57	0

- Canada 8-0 Switzerland
- Finland 4-0 Switzerland
- USSR 15-0 Switzerland
- Czechoslovakia 5-1 Switzerland
- Sweden 12-0 Switzerland
- Germany (UTG) 6-5 Switzerland
- USA 7-3 Switzerland

**Contestants**; Franz Berry; Roger Chappot; Rolf Diethelm; Elvin Friedrich; Gaston Furrer; Oskar Jenni; René Kiener; Pio Parolini; Kurt Pfammatter; Gérard Rigolet; Max Rüegg; Walter Salzmann; Herold Truffer; Peter Wespi; Otto Wittwer; Jürg Zimmermann; Peter Stammbach

== Luge ==
Men

Athlete	Run 1		Run 2		Run 3		Run 4		Total	
Athlete	Time	Rank	Time	Rank	Time	Rank	Time	Rank	Time	Rank
Ulrich Jucker	1:03.81	32	55.92	23	57.41	25	58.10	26	3:55.24	26
Jean-Pierre Gottschall	1:03.05	29	1:04.82	30	1:01.85	28	1:22.36	31	4:32.08	31
Arnold Gartmann	55.17	19	55.27	18	55.74	22	55.97	22	3:42.15	20
Emil Egli	55.01	18	56.24	24	54.80	16	55.51	20	3:41.56	18

(Men's) Doubles

Athletes	Run 1		Run 2		Total	
Athletes	Time	Rank	Time	Rank	Time	Rank
Beat Häsler; Arnold Gartmann	53.78	11	51.31	9	1:47.09	9
Emil Egli; Hansruedi Roth	54.88	12	55.20	10	1:50.08	11

Women

Athlete	Run 1		Run 2		Run 3		Run 4		Total	
Athlete	Time	Rank	Time	Rank	Time	Rank	Time	Rank	Time	Rank
Monika Lücker	55.35	14	DNF	–	–	–	–	–	DNF	–
Elisabeth Nagele	55.28	13	55.10	10	57.61	13	55.30	11	3:43.29	12
Ursula Amstein	54.25	10	56.58	11	55.90	12	56.08	13	3:42.81	11

== Nordic combined ==
Events:

- normal hill ski jumping (Three jumps, best two counted and shown here.)
- 15 km cross-country skiing

Athlete	Event	Ski Jumping				Cross-country			Total	
Athlete	Event	Distance 1	Distance 2	Points	Rank	Time	Points	Rank	Points	Rank
Alois Kälin	Individual	59.0	54.0	159.9	28	49:12.8	253.33	1	413.23	12

== Ski jumping ==
Athletes performed three jumps, the best two were counted and are shown here.

Athlete	Event	Jump 1		Jump 2		Total	
Athlete	Event	Distance	Points	Distance	Points	Points	Rank
Josef Zehnder	Normal hill	69.0	88.1	66.0	83.6	171.7	51
Ueli Scheidegger	Normal hill	72.0	89.4	68.5	87.0	176.4	48
Heribert Schmid	Normal hill	76.5	99.7	74.0	100.4	200.1	25
Josef Zehnder	Large hill	80.0	88.9	68.0	83.4	172.3	48
Ueli Scheidegger	Large hill	70.0	78.9	65.0	75.4	154.3	51
Heribert Schmid	Large hill	78.0	84.9	78.5	90.1	175.0	46

== Speed skating ==
Men

Event	Athlete	Race	
Event	Athlete	Time	Rank
500 m	Jean-Pierre Guéron	44.9	43
1500 m	Jean-Pierre Guéron	2:32.3	53
1500 m	Ruedi Uster	2:23.4	44
5000 m	Peter Büttner	8:45.5	40
5000 m	Ruedi Uster	8:24.8	32
10,000 m	Ruedi Uster	17:23.4	29
