= Biathlon at the 1964 Winter Olympics – Individual =

Men's biathlon individual at the IX Olympic Winter Games
- Venue: Seefeld
- Dates: 4 February 1964
- Competitors: 51 from 14 nations
- Winning time: 1:20:26.8

Medalists
1st place, gold medalist(s)		Vladimir Melanin	Soviet Union
2nd place, silver medalist(s)		Aleksandr Privalov	Soviet Union
3rd place, bronze medalist(s)		Olav Jordet	Norway

The Men's 20 kilometre individual biathlon competition at the 1964 Winter Olympics was held on 4 February, at Seefeld. The firing ranges were located at the following points on the 20-kilometer course: 6 km — 200 meter range, 10.4 km — 250 meter range, 11.8 km — 150 meter range and 17.1 km — 100 meter range. The first three series were fired from a prone position, the last standing. Each miss of the target cost two minutes.

== Results ==
Vladimir Melanin, the two time defending world champion, won the Olympic title with ease at Seefeld. He was one of just three racers to shoot clear, and also had a very quick ski time; the two men who skied faster than him, Ragnar Tveiten and Veikko Hakulinen had six and twelve minutes of penalties, respectively. This combination saw Melanin win the race by more than three full minutes. The silver medalist, Aleksandr Privalov, a bronze medalist at the last Olympics, had a slower ski time, but like Melanin, shot clear to earn his place. Olav Jordet earned bronze, ahead of Tveiten, as he combined a top-10 skiing time with only a single miss.

Rank	Bib	Name	Country	Ski Time	Misses	Result	Deficit
1st place, gold medalist(s)	23	Vladimir Melanin	Soviet Union	1:20:26.8	0 (0+0+0+0)	1:20:26.8	–
2nd place, silver medalist(s)	38	Aleksandr Privalov	Soviet Union	1:23:42.5	0 (0+0+0+0)	1:23:42.5	+3:15.7
3rd place, bronze medalist(s)	32	Olav Jordet	Norway	1:22:38.8	1 (0+0+0+1)	1:24:38.8	+4:12.0
4	45	Ragnar Tveiten	Norway	1:19:52.5	3 (1+1+0+1)	1:25:52.5	+5:25.7
5	21	Vilmoş Gheorghe	Romania	1:22:18.0	2 (0+1+0+1)	1:26:18.0	+5:51.2
6	44	Józef Rubiś	Poland	1:22:31.6	2 (1+0+0+1)	1:26:31.6	+6:04.8
7	2	Valentin Pshenitsyn	Soviet Union	1:22:59.0	2 (0+0+0+2)	1:26:59.0	+6:32.2
8	41	Hannu Posti	Finland	1:25:16.5	1 (1+0+0+0)	1:27:16.5	+6:49.7
9	6	John Güttke	Sweden	1:24:02.4	2 (0+0+0+2)	1:28:02.4	+7:35.6
10	40	Nikolay Puzanov	Soviet Union	1:21:21.5	4 (3+0+0+1)	1:29:21.5	+8:54.7
11	3	Jon Istad	Norway	1:23:24.8	3 (1+0+1+1)	1:29:24.8	+8:58.0
12	31	Sture Ohlin	Sweden	1:25:46.0	2 (1+1+0+0)	1:29:46.0	+9:19.2
13	35	Antti Tyrväinen	Finland	1:22:09.0	4 (0+2+0+2)	1:30:09.0	+9:42.2
14	10	Constantin Carabela	Romania	1:30:59.0	0 (0+0+0+0)	1:30:59.0	+10:32.2
15	15	Veikko Hakulinen	Finland	1:19:37.9	6 (2+1+0+3)	1:31:37.9	+11:11.1
16	47	Charlie Akers	United States	1:28:24.9	2 (1+0+1+0)	1:32:24.9	+11:58.1
17	17	Sven-Olov Axelsson	Sweden	1:21:13.6	6 (0+1+3+2)	1:33:13.6	+12:46.8
18	13	Stanisław Szczepaniak	Poland	1:27:43.5	3 (0+0+1+2)	1:33:43.5	+13:16.7
19	26	Yuji Yamanaka	Japan	1:29:51.8	2 (1+1+0+0)	1:33:51.8	+13:25.0
20	27	Józef Gąsienica-Sobczak	Poland	1:22:00.6	6 (4+0+2+0)	1:34:00.6	+13:33.8
21	22	Hans-Dieter Riechel	United Team of Germany	1:28:30.9	3 (1+0+0+2)	1:34:30.9	+14:04.1
22	24	Ola Wærhaug	Norway	1:24:38.0	5 (2+1+2+0)	1:34:38.0	+14:11.2
23	1	Esko Marttinen	Finland	1:24:50.2	5 (1+0+2+2)	1:34:50.2	+14:23.4
24	9	Egon Schnabel	United Team of Germany	1:30:53.0	2 (1+0+0+1)	1:34:53.0	+14:26.2
25	48	Sten Eriksson	Sweden	1:23:27.8	6 (2+2+1+1)	1:35:27.8	+15:01.0
26	14	Yoshio Ninomine	Japan	1:29:38.6	3 (0+0+1+2)	1:35:38.6	+15:11.8
27	46	Gheorghe Cimpoia	Romania	1:29:44.6	3 (0+2+0+1)	1:35:44.6	+15:17.8
28	49	Hansjörg Farbmacher	Austria	1:28:11.3	4 (3+0+0+1)	1:36:11.3	+15:44.5
29	5	John Dent	Great Britain	1:30:27.2	3 (0+1+1+1)	1:36:27.2	+16:00.4
30	4	Bill Spencer	United States	1:28:49.8	4 (3+0+0+1)	1:36:49.8	+16:23.0
31	50	Helmut Klöpsch	United Team of Germany	1:32:08.5	3 (1+0+1+1)	1:38:08.5	+17:41.7
32	30	Paul Romand	France	1:22:51.2	8 (1+2+2+3)	1:38:51.2	+18:24.4
33	37	Dieter Ritter	United Team of Germany	1:22:51.4	8 (0+2+4+2)	1:38:51.4	+18:24.6
34	33	Walter Müller	Austria	1:25:12.3	7 (1+3+2+1)	1:39:12.3	+18:45.5
35	11	Stanisław Styrczula	Poland	1:32:52.1	4 (0+1+0+3)	1:40:52.1	+20:25.3
36	39	Peter Lahdenpera	United States	1:27:04.7	8 (0+3+3+2)	1:43:04.7	+22:37.9
37	29	Alan Notley	Great Britain	1:36:10.3	5 (2+2+0+1)	1:46:10.3	+25:43.5
38	28	Bayanjavyn Damdinjav	Mongolia	1:32:19.7	7 (3+1+1+2)	1:46:19.7	+25:52.9
39	16	Paul Renne	United States	1:34:45.9	6 (3+1+1+1)	1:46:45.9	+26:19.1
40	51	John Moore	Great Britain	1:27:49.4	10 (4+1+3+2)	1:47:49.4	+27:22.6
41	7	Adolf Scherwitzl	Austria	1:36:12.7	6 (1+2+0+3)	1:48:12.7	+27:45.9
42	42	Bizyaagiin Dashgai	Mongolia	1:31:26.0	10 (3+2+2+3)	1:51:26.0	+30:59.2
43	19	Roderick Tuck	Great Britain	1:33:55.5	9 (3+3+1+2)	1:51:55.5	+31:28.7
44	25	Tudeviin Lkhamsüren	Mongolia	1:37:10.1	8 (2+4+1+1)	1:53:10.1	+32:43.3
45	36	Marcel Vogel	Switzerland	1:29:14.1	12 (2+3+3+4)	1:53:14.1	+32:47.3
46	20	Erich Schönbächler	Switzerland	1:29:59.5	12 (3+2+2+5)	1:53:59.5	+33:32.7
47	43	Willy Junod	Switzerland	1:28:00.7	13 (4+4+4+1)	1:54:00.7	+33:33.9
48	12	Peter Gerig	Switzerland	1:30:32.5	16 (3+5+5+3)	2:02:32.5	+42:05.7
49	8	Tsambyn Danzan	Mongolia	1:36:45.6	15 (4+5+2+4)	2:06:45.6	+46:18.8
		Paul Ernst	Austria	DNF			
		Nicolae Bărbăşescu	Romania	DNF			
