= Luge at the 1964 Winter Olympics – Doubles =

Doubles at the IX Olympic Winter Games
- Venue: Olympic Sliding Centre Innsbruck
- Dates: 5 February 1964
- Competitors: 30 from 8 nations
- Winning time: 1:41.62

Medalists
1st place, gold medalist(s)		Josef Feistmantl; Manfred Stengl	Austria
2nd place, silver medalist(s)		Reinhold Senn; Helmut Thaler	Austria
3rd place, bronze medalist(s)		Walter Ausserdorfer; Sigisfredo Mair	Italy

The Doubles luge competition at the 1964 Winter Olympics in Innsbruck was held on 5 February, at Olympic Sliding Centre Innsbruck.

== Results ==
Rank	Athletes	Country	Run 1	Run 2	Total
1st place, gold medalist(s)	Josef Feistmantl; Manfred Stengl	Austria	50.57	51.05	1:41.62
2nd place, silver medalist(s)	Reinhold Senn; Helmut Thaler	Austria	51.02	50.89	1:41.91
3rd place, bronze medalist(s)	Walter Ausserdorfer; Sigisfredo Mair	Italy	51.40	51.47	1:42.87
4	Walter Eggert; Helmut Vollprecht	United Team of Germany	51.27	51.81	1:43.08
5	Giampaolo Ambrosi; Giovanni Graber	Italy	51.54	52.23	1:43.77
5	Lucjan Kudzia; Ryszard Pędrak	Poland	51.95	51.82	1:43.77
7	Edward Fender; Mieczysław Pawełkiewicz	Poland	52.60	52.53	1:45.13
8	Jan Hamřík; Jiří Hujer	Czechoslovakia	52.75	52.66	1:45.41
9	Beat Häsler; Arnold Gartmann	Switzerland	53.78	53.31	1:47.09
10	Christian Hallén-Paulsen; Jan-Axel Strøm	Norway	52.52	55.30	1:47.82
11	Emil Egli; Hansruedi Roth	Switzerland	54.88	55.20	1:50.08
12	Horst Urban; Roland Urban	Czechoslovakia	52.21	1:19.49	2:11.70
13	Ray Fales; Nicholas Mastromatteo	United States	1:00.75	1:11.18	2:11.93
-	Thomas Köhler; Klaus-Michael Bonsack	United Team of Germany	53.13	DNS	-
-	Jim Higgins; Ron Walters	United States	DNF	-	-
