= Romania at the 1968 Winter Olympics =

- IOC code: ROU (RUM used at these Games)
- NOC: Romanian Olympic and Sports Committee
- Website: www.cosr.ro (in Romanian, English, and French)

in Grenoble
- Competitors: 30 (29 men, 1 woman) in 5 sports
- Flag bearer: Beatrice Huștiu
- Medals: Gold 0 Silver 0 Bronze 1 Total 1

Winter Olympics appearances (overview)
- 1928; 1932; 1936; 1948; 1952; 1956; 1960; 1964; 1968; 1972; 1976; 1980; 1984; 1988; 1992; 1994; 1998; 2002; 2006; 2010; 2014; 2018; 2022; 2026

Romania competed at the 1968 Winter Olympics in Grenoble, France. The two-man bobsleigh team of Nicolae Neagoe and Ion Panţuru won the nation's first medal at the Winter Games, a bronze. As of the 2026 games, they remain Romania's only Winter Olympic medalists.

== Medalists ==
Medal	Name	Sport	Event
Bronze	Ion Panturu; Nicolae Neagoe	Bobsleigh	Two-man

== Alpine skiing ==
Men

Athlete	Event	Race 1		Race 2		Total	
Athlete	Event	Time	Rank	Time	Rank	Time	Rank
Dorin Munteanu	Downhill					2:22.53	65
Dan Cristea	Downhill					2:18.52	62
Dorin Munteanu	Giant Slalom	1:55.78	55	1:59.18	60	3:54.96	55
Dan Cristea	Giant Slalom	1:54.66	52	1:56.98	50	3:51.64	49

Men's slalom

Athlete	Heat 1		Heat 2		Final					
Athlete	Time	Rank	Time	Rank	Time 1	Rank	Time 2	Rank	Total	Rank
Dorin Munteanu	57.72	5	56.05	3	did not advance					
Dan Cristea	53.75	2 QF	–	–	56.10	39	57.23	26	1:53.33	25

== Biathlon ==
Men

Event	Athlete	Time	Penalties	Adjusted time ^{1}	Rank
20 km	Nicolae Bărbăşescu	1'24:05.3	4	1'28:05.3	29
20 km	Gheorghe Cimpoia	1'25:36.5	1	1'26:36.5	23
20 km	Vilmoş Gheorghe	1'20:07.3	6	1'26:07.3	22
20 km	Constantin Carabela	1'22:52.2	0	1'22:52.2	14

^{1} One minute added per close miss (a hit in the outer ring), two minutes added per complete miss.

Men's 4 x 7.5 km relay

Athletes	Race		
Athletes	Misses ^{2}	Time	Rank
Gheorghe Cimpoia; Constantin Carabela; Nicolae Bărbăşescu; Vilmoş Gheorghe	4	2'25:39.8	7

^{2} A penalty loop of 200 metres had to be skied per missed target.

== Bobsleigh ==
Sled	Athletes	Event	Run 1		Run 2		Run 3		Run 4		Total	
Sled	Athletes	Event	Time	Rank	Time	Rank	Time	Rank	Time	Rank	Time	Rank
ROU-1	Ion Panţuru; Nicolae Neagoe	Two-man	1:10.20	2	1:11.62	6	1:11.31	7	1:11.33	4	4:44.46	3rd place, bronze medalist(s)
ROU-2	Romeo Nedelcu; Gheorghe Maftei	Two-man	n/a	?	n/a	?	n/a	?	DNF	–	DNF	–

Sled	Athletes	Event	Run 1		Run 2		Total	
Sled	Athletes	Event	Time	Rank	Time	Rank	Time	Rank
ROU-1	Ion Panţuru; Petre Hristovici; Gheorghe Maftei; Nicolae Neagoe	Four-man	1:10.59	6	1:07.55	3	2:18.14	4

== Figure skating ==
Women

Athlete	CF	FS	Points	Places	Rank
Beatrice Huștiu	31	20	1457.2	257	29

== Ice hockey ==
=== First round ===
West Germany - Romania 7:0 (1:0, 3:0, 3:0)
Goalscorers: Gustav Hanig 2, Alois Schloder, Ernst Kopf, Otto Schneitberger, Horst Meindl, Heinz Weisenbach.

=== Consolation Round ===
Teams in this group play for 9th-14th places.

Rank	Team	Pld	W	L	T	GF	GA	Pts
9	Yugoslavia	5	5	0	0	33	9	10
10	Japan	5	4	1	0	27	12	8
11	Norway	5	3	2	0	15	15	6
12	Romania	5	2	3	0	22	23	4
13	Austria	5	1	4	0	12	27	2
14	France	5	0	5	0	9	32	0

Romania – Austria 3:2 (2:1, 1:1, 0:0)
Goalscorers: Fagarasi, Calamar, Mois – Schupp, Samonig.

France – Romania 3:7 (0:2, 0:2, 3:3)
Goalscorers: Itzicsohn, Mazza, Lacarriere – Iuliu Szabo 2, Florescu 2, Pana, Geza Szabo, Stefan.

Japan – Romania 5:4 (3:0, 1:3, 1:1)
Goalscorers: Hikigi 2, Araki, Itoh, Kudo – Florescu, Pana, Mois, Ionescu.

Norway – Romania 4:3 (2:2, 1:1, 1:0)
Goalscorers: Bergeid, Olsen, Syversen, Mikkelsen – Pana, Iuliu Szabo, Czaka.

(Socialist Federal Republic of Yugoslavia) Yugoslavia – Romania 9:5 (5:3, 1:1, 3:1)
Goalscorers: Roman Smolej 2, Tisler 2, Felc 2, Ivo Jan, Hiti, Jug – Iuliu Szabo 2, Tekei, Florescu, Geza Szabo.

=== Contestants ===
12. ROMANIA
Goaltenders: Constantin Dumitras, Mihai Stoiculescu
Defence: Ion Stefan Ionescu, Zoltan Czaka, Dezső Varga, Zoltan Fogaras, Razvan Schiau
Forwards: Geza Szabo, Iulian Florescu, Alexandru Kalamar, Gyula Szabo, Eduard Pana, Ion Gheorghiu, Stefan Texe, Ion Basa, Aurel Mois, Valentin Stefanov
