= SG Dynamo Zinnwald =

Logo

SG Dynamo Zinnwald is a sector of SV Dynamo founded on October 15, 1956 and located in Altenberg, Saxony. It was renamed on October 7, 1990 to Sächsischer Wintersportverein Altenberg. In October 1992 the club teamed up with SV Zinnerz Altenberg, the former BSG Stahl Altenberg to SSV Altenberg.

== Sports covered ==
The main sports covered by the club were biathlon, bobsleigh and luge. Mainly in biathlon, Dynamo Zinnwald with athletes as Birk Anders, Günter Bartnik, Manfred Beer, Raik Dittrich, Ricco Groß, Steffen Hauswald, Andreas Heymann, Helmut Klöpsch, Arne Kluge, Heinz Kluge, Hansjörg Knauthe, Horst Koschka, Michael Lohschmidt, Joachim Meischner, Hans-Dieter Riechel, Dieter Ritter, Eberhard Rösch, Frank-Peter Roetsch, André Sehmisch, Klaus Siebert, Jens Steinigen and Steffen Thierfelder were one of the most successful clubs in this sport worldwide. In bobsport, Dynamo was represented by athletes as Matthias Benesch and Harald Czudaj.
