= Luge at the 1964 Winter Olympics – Men's singles =

Men's singles at the IX Olympic Winter Games
- Venue: Olympic Sliding Centre Innsbruck
- Dates: January 30-February 4, 1964
- Competitors: 38 from 12 nations
- Winning time: 3:26.77

Medalists
1st place, gold medalist(s)		Thomas Köhler	United Team of Germany
2nd place, silver medalist(s)		Klaus-Michael Bonsack	United Team of Germany
3rd place, bronze medalist(s)		Hans Plenk	United Team of Germany

The men's singles luge competition at the 1964 Winter Olympics in Innsbruck was held from 30 January to 4 February, at Olympic Sliding Centre Innsbruck. Tragedy affected the event as British luger Kazimierz Kay-Skrzypecki was killed during a practice run on January 23, seven days before the start of the competition.

== Results ==
Rank	Athlete	Country	Run 1	Run 2	Run 3	Run 4	Total
1st place, gold medalist(s)	Thomas Köhler	United Team of Germany	51.27	51.53	51.50	52.47	3:26.77
2nd place, silver medalist(s)	Klaus-Michael Bonsack	United Team of Germany	51.61	51.33	51.68	52.42	3:27.04
3rd place, bronze medalist(s)	Hans Plenk	United Team of Germany	52.12	52.25	52.31	53.47	3:30.15
4	Rolf Greger Strøm	Norway	52.60	52.81	52.62	53.18	3:31.21
5	Josef Feistmantl	Austria	52.14	52.58	53.51	53.11	3:31.34
6	Mieczysław Pawełkiewicz	Poland	54.00	52.70	52.66	53.66	3:33.02
7	Carlo Prinoth	Italy	53.01	53.36	53.70	53.42	3:33.49
8	Franz Tiefenbacher	Austria	53.31	53.04	54.00	53.51	3:33.86
9	Manfred Schmid	Austria	53.27	52.86	53.82	54.09	3:34.04
10	Jan Hamřík	Czechoslovakia	53.57	53.24	53.65	53.91	3:34.37
11	Lucjan Kudzia	Poland	53.11	55.44	52.36	53.51	3:34.42
12	Horst Urban	Czechoslovakia	53.32	53.13	54.13	53.92	3:34.50
13	Francis Feltman	United States	52.91	53.43	54.13	54.58	3:35.05
14	Mogens Christensen	Norway	54.43	55.00	53.80	54.44	3:37.67
15	Giampaolo Ambrosi	Italy	54.31	54.50	54.96	55.29	3:39.06
16	Walter Ausserdorfer	Italy	55.47	55.02	54.85	54.83	3:40.17
17	Tom Neely	United States	54.62	55.40	55.04	55.12	3:40.18
18	Emil Egli	Switzerland	55.01	56.24	54.80	55.51	3:41.56
19	Jan-Axel Strøm	Norway	55.78	55.27	55.15	55.78	3:41.98
20	Arnold Gartmann	Switzerland	55.17	55.27	55.74	55.97	3:42.15
21	Reinhold Senn	Austria	52.32	63.85	53.43	53.37	3:42.97
22	Mike Hessel	United States	55.31	55.50	56.12	56.37	3:43.30
23	Giovanni Graber	Italy	56.44	61.66	54.80	55.50	3:48.40
24	Jiří Hujer	Czechoslovakia	56.05	55.11	64.80	57.44	3:53.40
25	Keith Schellenberg	Great Britain	58.69	59.06	58.14	58.87	3:54.76
26	Ulrich Jucker	Switzerland	63.81	55.92	57.41	58.10	3:55.24
27	Hans Nägele	Liechtenstein	59.65	64.56	60.65	61.43	4:06.29
28	Jerzy Wojnar	Poland	64.47	53.14	70.72	63.36	4:11.69
29	George Farmer	United States	56.78	86.81	57.00	56.01	4:16.60
30	Magnus Schädler	Liechtenstein	63.16	63.26	65.75	64.94	4:17.11
31	Jean-Pierre Gottschall	Switzerland	63.05	64.82	61.85	82.36	4:32.08
-	Doug Anakin	Canada	?	?	DNS	-	-
-	Matiás Stinnes	Argentina	?	?	DNS	-	-
-	Gordon Porteus	Great Britain	60.98	DQ	-	-	-
-	Johann Schädler	Liechtenstein	63.16	DNF	-	-	-
-	Edward Fender	Poland	DNF	-	-	-	-
-	Fritz Nachmann	United Team of Germany	DNF	-	-	-	-
-	Roland Urban	Czechoslovakia	DNF	-	-	-	-
