= Smržov =

Smržov may refer to places in the Czech Republic:

- Smržov (Hradec Králové District), a municipality and village in the Hradec Králové Region
- Smržov (Jindřichův Hradec District), a municipality and village in the South Bohemian Region
- Smržov, a village and part of Český Dub in the Liberec Region

== See also ==
- Smržovka
