= SG Dynamo Erfurt =

German sports club

SG Dynamo Erfurt was an East German sports community of sports association SV Dynamo, which became defunct after reunification. It existed from 1966 until 1989.

== See also ==
- Sportvereinigung (SV) Dynamo
