= Ron Walters (disambiguation) =

Ron Walters (1938–2010) was an American author, speaker, and scholar of African-American politics.

Ron Walters may also refer to:

- Ron Walters (ice hockey) (born 1948), Canadian retired WHA player
- Ron Walters (luger) (born 1943), American Olympic luger
- Ron Walters (make-up artist) (1938–1994), American make-up artist
- Ron Walters (politician) (born 1950), American politician
- Ron E. Walters (born 1962), American government official
