= Raik Dittrich =

East German biathlete

Medal record

Men's biathlon

Representing East Germany

World Championships
Gold medal – first place	1990 Oslo	Team event
Bronze medal – third place	1989 Feistritz an der Drau	Team event

Raik J. Dittrich (born 12 October 1968 in Sebnitz) is a retired East German biathlete who won two World Championships medals. He represented the sports club SG Dynamo Zinnwald / Sportvereinigung (SV) Dynamo. and Ski Club Ruhpolding.

Raik Dittrich began his international career for the GDR. He competed for SG Dynamo Zinnwald and was coached by Heinz Kluge, Horst Koschka, Klaus Siebert and Steffen Thierfelder. At the 1989 Biathlon World Championships in Feistritz an der Drau, he won the bronze medal in the team competition together with Andreas Heymann, André Sehmisch and Steffen Hoos. His career highlight came in 1990 when he won the gold medal in the team competition at the World Championships with Mark Kirchner, Birk Anders and Frank Luck.

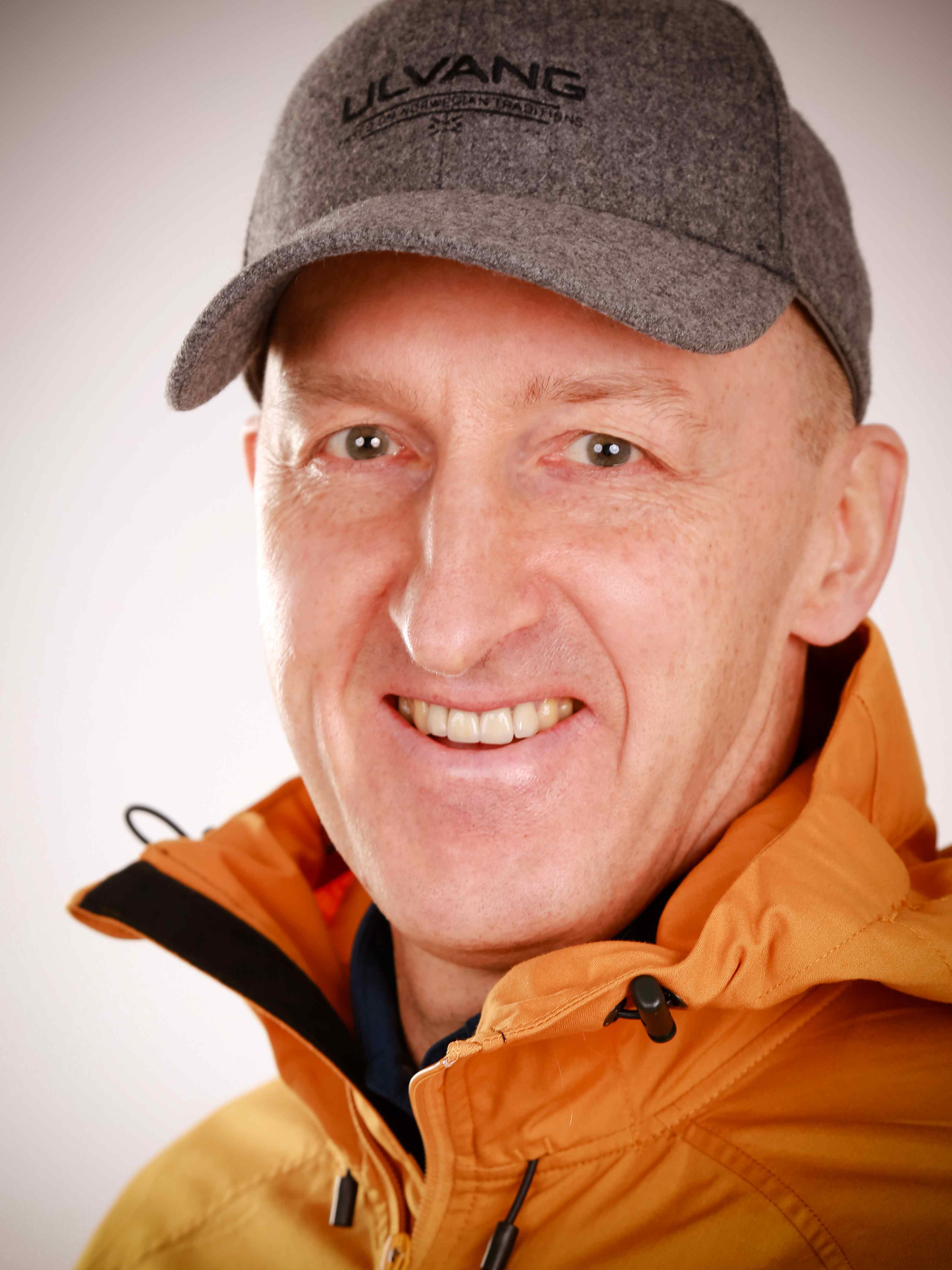
Portrait (private)

After his active career, Dittrich was a ski technician at the German Ski Federation from 1992 to 1998, initially in the biathlon and later responsible for the Nordic combined. After graduating in business administration, he initially worked as product manager and sales manager for Germany for a German ski wax manufacturer. From 2003 to 2008, he worked there as an authorized signatory and as Head of the Ski Wax Division. From 2008 to 2022, he worked as managing director for a company in the outdoor and sports industry. Dittrich lives with his family in Wuerzbach in the Black Forest and has three sons. Since 2022, Dittrich has been managing consulting projects for the sports and outdoor industry across Europe.
