= Stanisław Styrczula =

Polish biathlete (1929–2020)

Personal information
- Nationality: Polish
- Born: 26 January 1929; Kościelisko, Poland
- Died: 17 August 2020 (aged 91)

Sport
- Sport: Biathlon

Stanisław Styrczula (26 January 1929 – 17 August 2020) was a Polish biathlete. He competed in the 20 km individual event at the 1964 Winter Olympics.
