= Yuji Yamanaka =

Japanese biathlete (born 1937)

Personal information
- Nationality: Japanese
- Born: 26 June 1937 (age 87); Aomori, Japan

Sport
- Sport: Biathlon

Yuji Yamanaka (born 26 June 1937) is a Japanese biathlete. He competed in the 20 km individual event at the 1964 Winter Olympics.
