= Jim Higgins (luger) =

American luger (born 1936)

Personal information
- Born: March 9, 1936 (age 90) Los Angeles, California, United States

Sport
- Sport: Luge

Jim Higgins (born March 9, 1936) is an American luger. He competed in the men's doubles event at the 1964 Winter Olympics.
