= Ray Fales =

American luger (born 1934)

Personal information
- Nationality: American
- Born: February 4, 1934 (age 92) Boston, Massachusetts, U.S.

Sport
- Sport: Luge

Raymond Lawrence Fales (born February 4, 1934) is an American luger. He competed in the men's doubles event at the 1964 Winter Olympics.
