= Walter Eggert =

German luger (1940–2017)

Personal information
- Nationality: German
- Born: 18 July 1940; Ilsenburg, Germany
- Died: 2 June 2017 (aged 76)

Sport
- Sport: Luge

Walter Eggert (18 July 1940 – 2 June 2017) was a German luger. He competed in the men's doubles event at the 1964 Winter Olympics.
