= Paul Renne (biathlete) =

American biathlete (1939–1970)

Personal information
- Nationality: American
- Born: November 9, 1939 Bozeman, Montana, United States
- Died: April 18, 1970 (aged 30) Hays, Kansas, United States

Sport
- Sport: Biathlon

Paul Renne (November 9, 1939 – April 18, 1970) was an American biathlete. He competed in the 20 km individual event at the 1964 Winter Olympics.
