= Esko Marttinen =

Finnish biathlete

Personal information
- Nationality: Finnish
- Born: 15 January 1938 (age 87); Kajaani, Finland

Sport
- Sport: Biathlon

Esko Marttinen (born 15 January 1938) is a Finnish biathlete. Marttinen competed in the 20 km individual event at the 1964 Winter Olympics.
