= Charlie Akers =

American biathlete (1939–2016)

Personal information
- Full name: Charles Arthur Akers
- National team: United States
- Born: July 12, 1939 Rumford, Maine, United States
- Died: June 30, 2016 (aged 76) Palmer, Alaska, United States
- Spouse: Linda Akers

Sport
- Sport: Biathlon

Charles Arthur Akers (July 12, 1939 – June 30, 2016) was an American biathlete. He competed in the 20 km individual event at the 1964 Winter Olympics.

Akers grew up in Andover, Maine, attended the University of Maine, and retired to Palmer, Alaska after his athletics career, becoming a member of the National Ski Patrol.
