= Carlo Prinoth =

Italian luger (born 1943)

Personal information
- Nationality: Italian
- Born: 20 June 1943 (age 81); Urtijëi, Italy

Sport
- Sport: Luge

Carlo Prinoth (born 20 June 1943) is an Italian luger. He competed in the men's singles event at the 1964 Winter Olympics.
