= Tudeviin Lkhamsüren =

Mongolian biathlete (born 1936)

Personal information
- Nationality: Mongolian
- Born: 20 February 1936 (age 89)

Sport
- Sport: Biathlon

Tudeviin Lkhamsüren (born 20 February 1936) is a Mongolian biathlete. He competed in the 20 km individual event at the 1964 Winter Olympics.
