= Stasi Decorations and Memorabilia =

Three volume text

Stasi Decorations and Memorabilia

Stasi Decorations and Memorabilia, by Ralph Pickard is a three-volume, in-depth analysis of the socialist political culture of the Ministry for State Security (Stasi) of the German Democratic Republic (GDR). It provides information about the organization using artifacts such as medals, certificates, and other objects to document the Stasi's awards and recognition of its members. Altogether, all three volumes contain over 900 pages with over 1700 illustrations.

== Reception ==
Volume I, published in 2007, was well received by academics and collectors. A review by the Central Intelligence Agency's Studies in Intelligence in September 2008 stated that, "Ralph Pickard has taken a step in the direction of preserving a piece of the East German heraldic record with his new reference work." David Nickles, Ph.D. observed that, "Given the tremendous growth of interest in cultural history during recent years, I hope and expect that historians will appreciate the extent to which a book like this, with its emphasis on decorations and memorabilia, sheds light on the political culture of the German Democratic Republic."

Additionally, the editor of Military Trader stated in his review (March 2008 Volume 15, Issue 3); "Researchers, historians and collectors with an interest in the Cold War or East Germany's security organization will appreciate the data in the book. A large portion of the book provides detailed information on the different award documents and timelines of when these documents were in use."

Volume II, published in early 2012, has been well received by both the East German collecting and academic communities. Colonel (Ret) Friedrich Jeschonnek, a book reviewer for Hardthöhenkurier magazine stated that there is a lot of literature on the Stasi that has focused on secret operations and structure. However, there has been very little work that has focused on Stasi culture which has been revealed in the photos, certificates and documents that have now been illustrated by both Volume I and II (Issue 3/2012). He further stated, for those who are concerned with the history of the GDR, the inner workings of the Secret Police and Phaleristics of the armed forces, both Volumes I and II are a must.

Hayden Peake, a book reviewer, wrote in the September 2012 Volume 56 issue of Studies in Intelligence that both Volume I and II were invaluable for those concerned in knowing more about Stasi history and culture.

== Contents ==
Volume I

- Foreword by Ambassador Hugh Montgomery
- Chapter 1 Historical overview of the Early Years of East Germany and the MfS
- Chapter 2 Outline of the book
- Chapter 3 Documents awarded to members of the SfS and MfS during the mid 1950s
- Chapter 4 Verdienstmedaille der Grenztruppen der DDR
- Chapter 5 Medaille der Waffenbrüderschaft
- Chapter 6 Für Treue Dienste in der Nationalen Volksarmee
- Chapter 7 Verdienstmedaille der Nationalen Volksarmee
- Chapter 8 Medaille für Vorbildlichen Grenzdienst
- Chapter 9 Verdienter Mitarbeiter der Staatssicherheit
- Chapter 10 Kampforden für Verdienste um Volk und Vaterland
- Chapter 11 Vaterländischer Verdienstorden
- Chapter 12 Additional DDR award documents presented to MfS personnel
- Chapter 13 Foreign presentations to MfS personnel
- Chapter 14 MfS Erinnerungsabzeichen
- Chapter 15 MfS Langjährige Treue Dienste
- Chapter 16 Document covers for MfS presentation documents
- Chapter 17 MfS Signatures
- Chapter 18 MfS Ausweis
- Chapter 19 MfS Medaille
- Bibliography

Volume II

- Foreword by Ambassador Hugh Montgomery
- Chapter 20 DDR and Foreign Award Documents Presented to Members and Organizations of the MfS
- Chapter 21 The Wachregiment F. Dzierzynski and Other Uniformed Units with the STASI
- Chapter 22 Free German Youth - Freie Deutsche Jugend - FDJ
- Chapter 23 Juristische Hochschule des MfS
- Chapter 24 Rank Structure, Promotion and Salary with the MfS
- Chapter 25 SV Dynamo History and Memorabilia
- Chapter 26 Birthday Documents and Other MfSs Anniversary Memorabilia
- Chapter 27 MfS/AfNS Retirement From Active Duty Documents
- Chapter 28 KGB Badges, Documentation and Memorabilia
- Chapter 29 Richard Sorge and Felix Dzierzynski Memorabilia
- Chapter 30 MfS Wax Seal and Ink Stamps
- Chapter 31 STASI Decorations and Memorabilia A Collectors Guide Volume 1 Update
- Bibliography

Volume III

- Foreword by Jefferson Adams, Ph.D.
- Chapter 32 Anti-Fascism and the MfS in East Germany
- Chapter 33 Medals, Decorations and Other Memorabilia Presented to East German, Soviet and Warsaw Pact Intelligence and Security Personnel
- Chapter 34 MfS and Other Eastern Bloc Intelligence and Security Services Support to the Democratic Republic of Vietnam
- Chapter 35 Retirement and Reserve Abbreviations Used on MfS Award Documents
- Chapter 36 Books Associated with the MfS
- Chapter 37 Special Combat Forces of the MfS – Spezialkampfkräfte –
- Chapter 38 STASI Decorations And Memorabilia, A Collector’s Guide – Updates To Volumes I And II
- Bibliography
