= Nicholas Mastromatteo =

American luger (1933–2018)

Personal information
- Nationality: American
- Born: September 13, 1933 Glen Cove, New York, United States
- Died: June 16, 2018 (aged 84) Los Angeles, California, United States

Sport
- Sport: Luge

Nicholas Paul Mastromatteo (September 13, 1933 – June 16, 2018) was an American luger. He competed in the men's doubles event at the 1964 Winter Olympics.
