= Egon Schnabel =

German biathlete

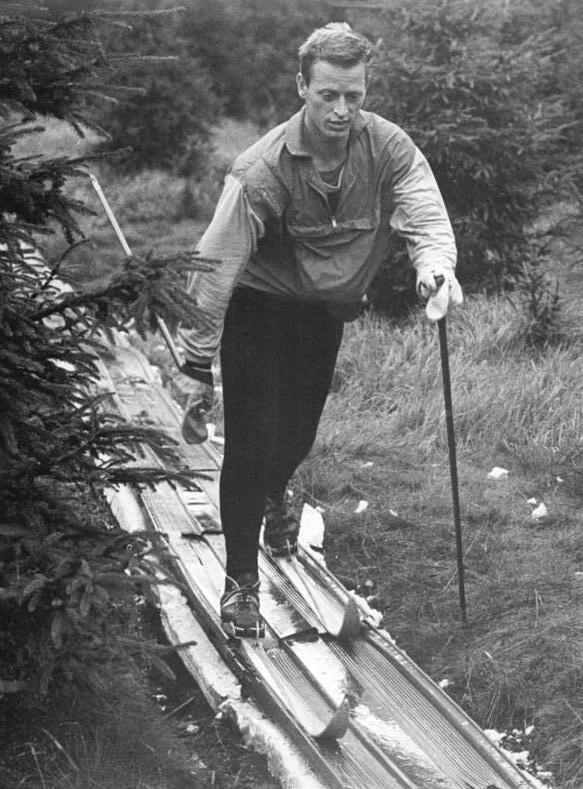
- Schnabel in 1967

Personal information
- Nationality: German
- Born: 19 May 1937 (age 87); Wechmar, Germany

Sport
- Sport: Biathlon

Egon Schnabel (born 19 May 1937) is a German biathlete. He competed in the 20 km individual event at the 1964 Winter Olympics.
