= Helmut Vollprecht =

German luger (born 1941)

Personal information
- Nationality: German
- Born: 24 November 1941 (age 83); Oybin, Germany

Sport
- Sport: Luge

Helmut Vollprecht (born 24 November 1941) is a German luger. He competed in the men's doubles event at the 1964 Winter Olympics.
