= Walter Müller (biathlete) =

Austrian biathlete (1940–1966)

Personal information
- Nationality: Austrian
- Born: 16 April 1940; Innsbruck, Austria
- Died: 10 June 1966 (aged 26); Neustift im Stubaital, Austria

Sport
- Sport: Biathlon

Walter Müller (16 April 1940 – 10 June 1966) was an Austrian biathlete. He competed in the 20 km individual event at the 1964 Winter Olympics.
