= Tsambyn Danzan =

Mongolian biathlete (born 1945)

Personal information
- Nationality: Mongolian
- Born: 29 January 1945 (age 80)

Sport
- Sport: Biathlon

Tsambyn Danzan (born 29 January 1945) is a Mongolian biathlete. He competed in the 20 km individual event at the 1964 Winter Olympics.
