= Franz Tiefenbacher =

Austrian luger (born 1942)

Personal information
- Nationality: Austrian
- Born: 16 September 1942 (age 82); Weissenbach an der Triesting, Austria

Sport
- Sport: Luge

Franz Tiefenbacher (born 16 September 1942) is an Austrian luger. He competed in the men's singles event at the 1964 Winter Olympics.
