= Yoshio Ninomine =

Japanese biathlete (born 1942)

Personal information
- Nationality: Japanese
- Born: 2 July 1942 (age 82); Hokkaido, Japan

Sport
- Sport: Biathlon

Yoshio Ninomine (born 2 July 1942) is a Japanese biathlete. He competed in the 20 km individual event at the 1964 Winter Olympics.
