= Petr Urban =

Czech illustrator, cartoonist and luger (born 1960)

Personal information
- Nationality: Czech
- Born: 8 August 1960 (age 66) Jablonec nad Nisou, Czechoslovakia

Sport
- Sport: Luge

Petr Urban (born 8 August 1960) is a Czech illustrator, cartoonist, painter and former luger. He draws jokes for newspapers and magazines and is known in his country for the character of the pub loafer Ruda Pivrnec. He participated in the Olympic Games as a luger in 1988 and 1992.

== Life and family ==
Petr Urban was born in a hospital in Jablonec nad Nisou, but he is native of the nearby town of Smržovka. He has lived in Smržovka his entire life. His father is the luger Horst Urban and his uncle is the luger Roland Urban. He is married and has a son, Petr Jr.

== Artistic career ==
The main part of Urban's artistic career is drawing jokes for magazines and newspapers. He is best known for the character of the pub loafer Ruda Pivrnec, who appears repeatedly in his jokes throughout his career. Urban is the author of dozens of books with cartoon jokes, but he also illustrated books by various authors. Since 1993, he has been annually publishing his own calendar.

In 2014, he painted fifteen serious images for the Stations of the Cross in Smržovka.

Urban is the author of the longest cartoon joke in the world. It contains no words, is 150 m (490 ft) long and was published as a book in 2019.

== Sports career ==
Urban competed in luge at the 1988 Winter Olympics and the 1992 Winter Olympics. In 1988, he finished 16th in the men's singles event and 13th in the doubles event (with Luboš Jíra). In 1992, he finished 19th in the men's singles event and 15th in the doubles event (with Jan Kohoutek).

Urban became the champion of the Czech Republic and Czechoslovakia 17 times.
