= Horst Urban =

Czech luger (1936–2010)

Personal information
- Nationality: Czech
- Born: 15 May 1936; Jablonec nad Nisou, Czechoslovakia
- Died: 2 March 2010 (aged 73)

Sport
- Sport: Luge

Horst Urban (15 May 1936 – 2 March 2010) was a Czech luger. He competed at the 1964 Winter Olympics and the 1968 Winter Olympics.

== Life ==
Urban was born on 15 May 1936 in Jablonec nad Nisou, but he lived in the nearby town of Smržovka, where his family lived from 1720. His brother was the luger Roland Urban and his son is the illustrator and luger Petr Urban. He was the creator of the luge track in Smržovka, which was opened in 1975. He died in Smržovka on 2 March 2010, at the age of 73.

== Sports career ==
Urban competed in luge at the 1964 Winter Olympics and the 1968 Winter Olympics. In 1964, he finished 12th in the men's singles event and 12th in the doubles event (with his brother Roland). In 1992, he finished 24th in the men's singles event and 12th in the doubles event (with Roland).

Urban became the champion of Czechoslovakia 16 times. At the 1965 World Championships in Davos, he finished in fourth place, which is the best result in the history of this sport in the Czech Republic and Czechoslovakia.
