= Dynamosport =

- Type: Monthly or two times per month
- Format: Since 1 January 1966: 52.8 cm × 37.1 cm Since 1 January 1983: Folio
- Owner(s): Sportvereinigung Dynamo; SA
- Editor: Bureau for the central management of the SV Dynamo, SV Dynamo Pictures (German: Büro der zentralen Leitung der Sportvereinigung Dynamo; Dynamobild) Print: Ministry of Interior of the GDR
- Founded: 1966
- Ceased publication: 23 November 1989
- Political alignment: Socialism, Leninism, Marxism vs. Maoism
- Language: German
- Headquarters: East Berlin; Dynamo Sportforum

Dynamosport was the official magazine of the Sportvereinigung Dynamo. It covered the organization and events of the roughly 190 Dynamo clubs in the GDR. It was founded in 1966 and was published until 23 November 1989. The logo looks like a brushed painting with the writing Dynamosport in white in background in wine-red.

== Structure ==
Dynamo Sport began as a release from the "Information sheet of the Dynamo Sports Club" (German: "Informationsblatt der Sportvereinigung Dynamo") (1964–1965). The design had two major periods: 1966–1974 and 1977–1989.

=== Design until 1974 ===
The "first page" in 1983

At the top is the lettering Dynamo sports and a box with the comment: "You read today". There are always 4 boxes, which have numbers of certain pages and to highlight the ever changing themes. The number of pages is limited to 8, on thin, rough paper. Color is red and white for the highlights of the logo "Dynamo sports" and black-red or blue-black for emphasis. The font color of the text is black and available in size 8. The title is from the subject in the newspaper always fat and 18.5 in Arial size. The text itself has the font size Times New Roman in size 9.5. The different themes are always separated by lines or completely framed in the box. The ratio of the text area and the pictures in the square measure is approximately 1:3 for parts of the image, as can be in a tabloid, it has been customary. And so will the whole leaf looks like a sports section of a tabloid newspaper also, and it explicitly but comes to the Dynamo sports, with the reference to the political orientation of the German Democratic Republic. Later, the graphical subdivision of the text boxes, other colors come to the expression, such as yellow-black or green and white. Or there are vertically juxtaposed joists that form this close to a cross a line.

At the time this newspaper was printed in the East, just three television programs and a handful of radio stations existed; there was no Internet or mass media. Dynamo sport was an ideal medium for the Ministry of the Interior of the GDR, but this does not necessarily mean that important information was printed in a sports newspaper.

Authors were not at all mentioned. Athletes were interviewed at most and rarely had the opportunity to write a new column. Often there inside are only reports.

=== 1977 redesign ===
The structure was as before in 1974. There were 24 issues and monthly editions thereafter, in 1977. A special issue covered Felix Dzerzhinsky with graphical banner. He also has been addressed in several editions, during his hundredth birthday.
