= Dieter Ritter =

German biathlete

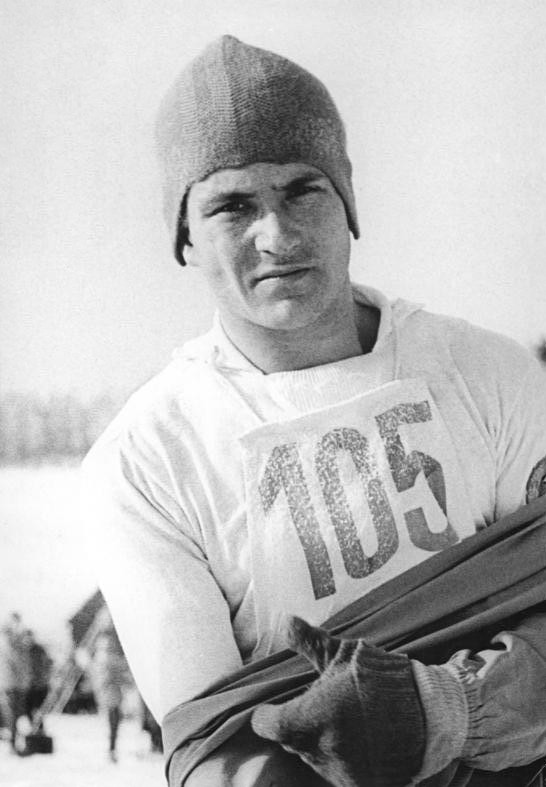
- Dieter Ritter in 1963

Personal information
- Nationality: German
- Born: 26 July 1941 (age 83); Geising, Germany

Sport
- Sport: Biathlon

Dieter Ritter (born 26 July 1941) is a German former biathlete. He competed in the 20 km individual event at the 1964 Winter Olympics.
