= Christian Hallén-Paulsen =

Norwegian luger (1945–2012)

Personal information
- Born: 24 December 1945; Oslo, Norway
- Died: 30 December 2012 (aged 67)

Sport
- Sport: Luge

Christian Hallén-Paulsen (24 December 1945 – 30 December 2012) was a Norwegian luger. He was born in Oslo. He participated at the 1964 Winter Olympics in Innsbruck, where he placed 10th in doubles (together with Jan-Axel Strøm).
