= Franz Kälin =

Swiss cross-country skier

Personal information
- Nationality: Swiss
- Born: 24 September 1939 (age 85); Einsiedeln, Switzerland

Sport
- Sport: Cross-country skiing

Franz Kälin (born 24 September 1939) is a Swiss cross-country skier. He competed at the 1964 Winter Olympics and the 1968 Winter Olympics.
