= Konrad Hischier =

Swiss cross-country skier

Personal information
- Nationality: Swiss
- Born: 13 August 1935; Oberwald, Switzerland
- Died: 19 December 2012 (aged 77); Visp, Switzerland

Sport
- Sport: Cross-country skiing

Konrad Hischier (13 August 1935 – 19 December 2012) was a Swiss cross-country skier. He competed at the 1960 Winter Olympics, the 1964 Winter Olympics and the 1968 Winter Olympics.
