= Emil Egli =

Swiss luger (born 1941)

Personal information
- Nationality: Swiss
- Born: 18 December 1941 (age 83)

Sport
- Sport: Luge

Emil Egli (born 18 December 1941) is a Swiss luger. He competed in the men's singles and doubles events at the 1964 Winter Olympics.
