= Marcel Vogel (biathlete) =

Swiss biathlete (born 1937)

Personal information
- Nationality: Swiss
- Born: 9 March 1937 (age 88); Weinfelden, Switzerland

Sport
- Sport: Biathlon

Marcel Vogel (born 9 March 1937) is a Swiss biathlete. He competed in the 20 km individual event at the 1964 Winter Olympics.
