= Ron Walters (luger) =

American luger (born 1943)

Personal information
- Born: May 28, 1943 (age 83) Altus, Oklahoma, United States

Sport
- Sport: Luge

Ron Walters (born May 28, 1943) is an American luger. He competed in the men's doubles event at the 1964 Winter Olympics.
