= Helmut Klöpsch =

German biathlete (1939–2019)

Personal information
- Nationality: German
- Born: 4 December 1939; Gliwice, Poland
- Died: 13 September 2019 (aged 79)

Sport
- Sport: Biathlon

Helmut Klöpsch (4 December 1939 – 13 September 2019) was a German biathlete. He competed in the 20 km individual event at the 1964 Winter Olympics.
