= Peter Gerig =

Swiss biathlete

Personal information
- Nationality: Swiss
- Born: 19 March 1934 (age 91); Göschenen, Switzerland

Sport
- Sport: Biathlon

Peter Gerig (born 19 March 1934) is a Swiss biathlete. He competed in the 20 km individual event at the 1964 Winter Olympics.
