= Roland Urban =

Czech luger (1940–2011)

Personal information
- Nationality: Czech
- Born: 29 March 1940; Jablonec nad Nisou, Nazi Germany
- Died: 26 February 2011 (aged 70); Smržovka, Czech Republic

Sport
- Sport: Luge

Roland Urban (29 March 1940 – 26 February 2011) was a Czech luger. He competed at the 1964 Winter Olympics and the 1968 Winter Olympics.

He was the brother of the luger Horst Urban, with whom he participated in the double events, and uncle of the illustrator and luger Petr Urban.
