= Willy Junod =

Swiss biathlete (born 1937)

Personal information
- Nationality: Swiss
- Born: 23 September 1937 (age 87); Dombresson, Switzerland

Sport
- Sport: Biathlon

Willy Junod (born 23 September 1937) is a Swiss biathlete. He competed in the 20 km individual event at the 1964 Winter Olympics.
