= John Güttke =

Swedish biathlete (1931–2007)

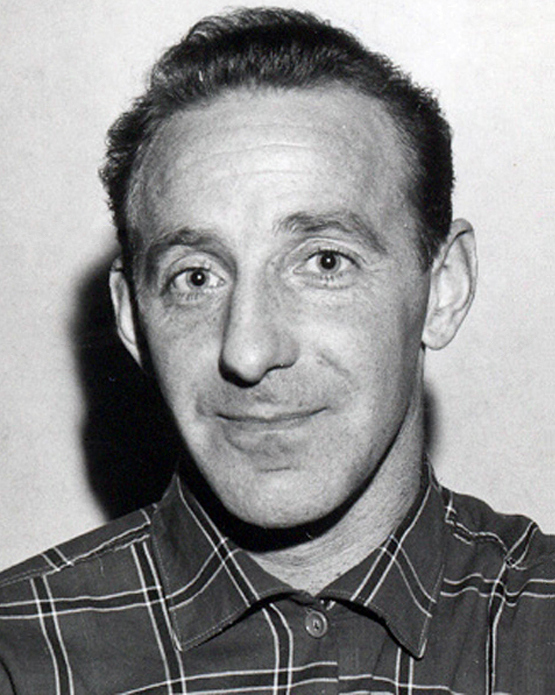

Personal information
- Born: 30 March 1931 Eda Municipality, Sweden
- Died: 18 December 2007 (aged 76) Gunnarskog, Sweden
- Height: 168 cm (5 ft 6 in)
- Weight: 68 kg (150 lb)

Sport
- Sport: Biathlon
- Club: Åmotfors SF

John Olov Güttke (30 March 1931 – 18 December 2007) was a Swedish biathlete. He competed in the 20 km event at the 1964 Winter Olympics and finished ninth.
