= Sten Eriksson =

Retired Swedish biathlete (born 1935)

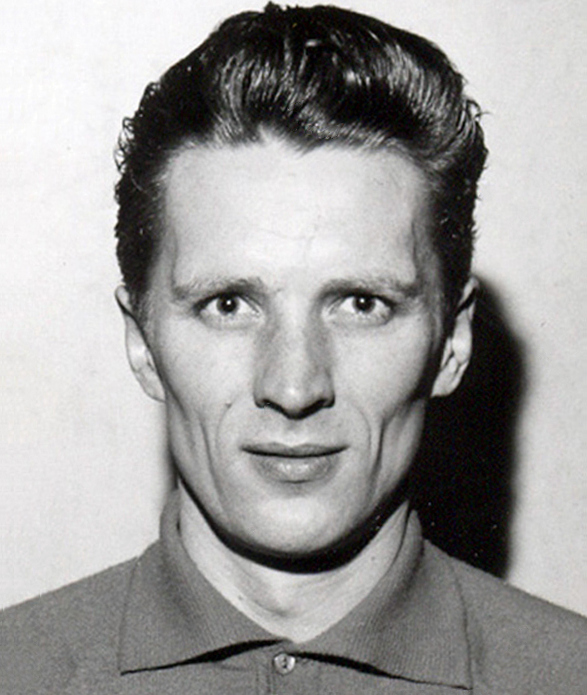

Personal information
- Born: 19 January 1935 (age 91) Älvdalen, Sweden
- Height: 182 cm (6 ft 0 in)
- Weight: 72 kg (159 lb)

Sport
- Sport: Biathlon
- Club: Älvdalens SG, Älvdalen

Orr Sten Evert Eriksson (born 19 January 1935) is a retired Swedish biathlete. He competed in the 20 km event at the 1964 Winter Olympics and finished 25th.
