= Georges Dubois (skier) =

Swiss cross-country skier

Personal information
- Nationality: Swiss
- Born: 19 May 1935 La Chaux-de-Fonds, Switzerland
- Died: 8 September 2018 (aged 83)

Sport
- Sport: Cross-country skiing

Georges Dubois (19 May 1935 – 8 September 2018) was a Swiss cross-country skier. He competed in the men's 30 kilometre event at the 1964 Winter Olympics.
