= Dorin Munteanu =

Romanian alpine skier (1946–2023)

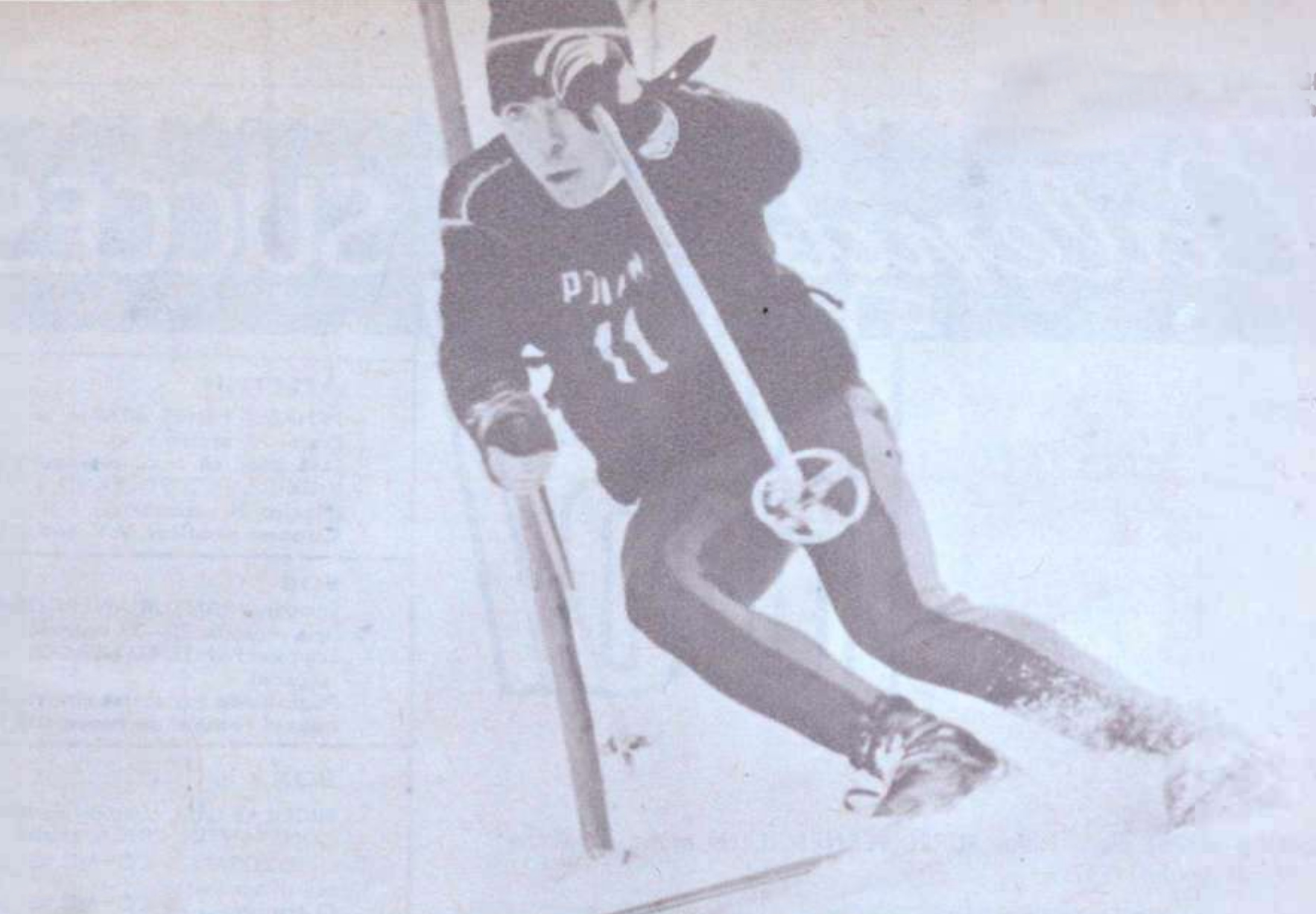

Personal information
- Nationality: Romanian
- Born: 6 March 1946; Moeciu de Jos, Romania
- Died: 28 June 2023 (aged 77)

Sport
- Sport: Alpine skiing

Dorin Munteanu (6 March 1946 – 27 June 2023) was a Romanian alpine skier. He competed in three events at the 1968 Winter Olympics.
