= Smržov (Hradec Králové District) =

- Municipality
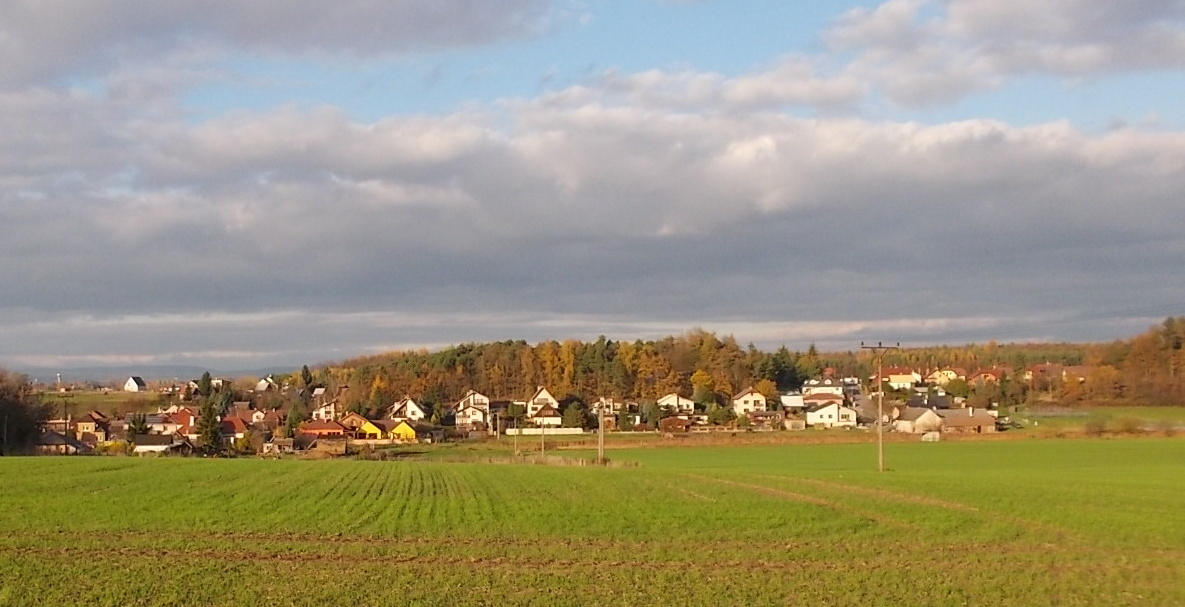
- General view

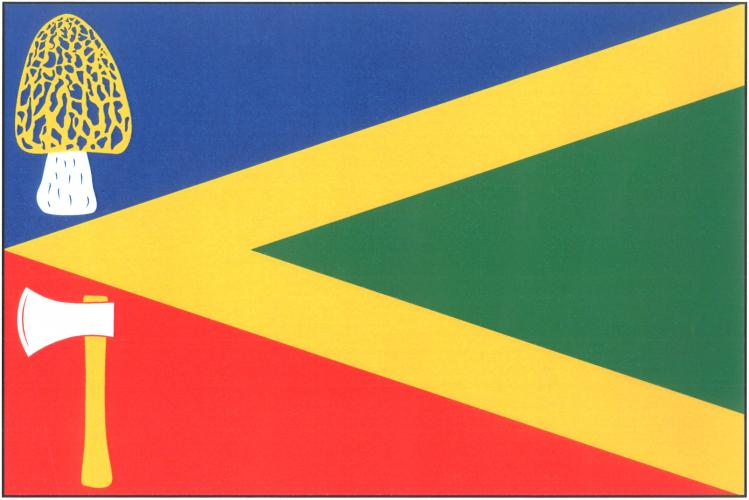
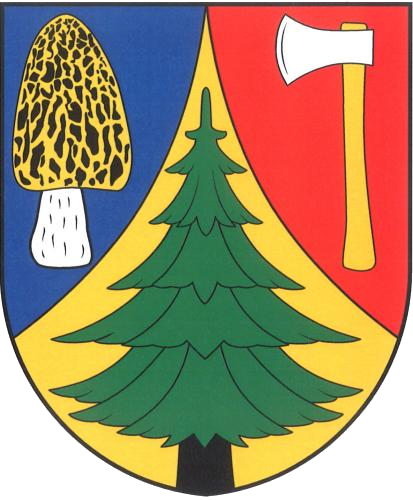
- Flag Coat of arms

- Location in the Czech Republic
- Coordinates: 50°17′59″N 15°55′5″E
- Country: Czech Republic
- Region: Hradec Králové
- District: Hradec Králové
- First mentioned: 1500

Area
  - Total: 5.14 km^{2} (1.98 sq mi)
- Elevation: 248 m (814 ft)

Population (2026-01-01)
  - Total: 549
  - Density: 107/km^{2} (277/sq mi)
- Time zone: UTC+1 (CET)
  - Summer (DST): UTC+2 (CEST)
- Postal code: 503 03
- Website: www.smrzov.cz

Smržov is a municipality and village in Hradec Králové District in the Hradec Králové Region of the Czech Republic. It has about 500 inhabitants.

== Administrative division ==
Smržov consists of two municipal parts (in brackets population according to the 2021 census):

- Smržov (392)
- Hubíles (141)

== Demographics ==
Historical population
Year	Pop.	±%
1869	538	—
1880	589	+9.5%
1890	549	−6.8%
1900	510	−7.1%
1910	515	+1.0%
1921	493	−4.3%
1930	461	−6.5%
1950	370	−19.7%
1961	395	+6.8%
1970	383	−3.0%
1980	349	−8.9%
1991	361	+3.4%
2001	388	+7.5%
2011	465	+19.8%
2021	533	+14.6%
Source: Censuses
