= Hans Ammann =

Swiss cross-country skier

Personal information
- Nationality: Swiss
- Born: 3 March 1931 Grabs, Switzerland
- Died: 1980 (aged 48–49) Alt St. Johann, Switzerland

Sport
- Sport: Cross-country skiing

Hans Ammann (3 March 1931 – 1980) was a Swiss cross-country skier. He competed in the men's 15 kilometre event at the 1964 Winter Olympics. He was flagbearers for Switzerland at the Opening Ceremony of 1964 Winter Olympics.
