= Ruedi Uster =

Swiss speed skater

Personal information
- Nationality: Swiss
- Born: 4 September 1941 (age 84) Staw, Poland

Sport
- Sport: Speed skating

Ruedi Uster (born 4 September 1941) is a Swiss speed skater. He competed at the 1964 Winter Olympics and the 1968 Winter Olympics.
