= Jean-Pierre Guéron =

Swiss speed skater (born 1944)

Personal information
- Nationality: Swiss
- Born: 24 August 1944 (age 82) Geneva, Switzerland

Sport
- Sport: Speed skating

Jean-Pierre Guéron (born 24 August 1944) is a Swiss speed skater, who competed in the 500m & 1500m speed skating events placing 43rd & 53rd respectively at the 1964 Winter Olympics.
