= Hans-Dieter Riechel =

German biathlete

Personal information
- Nationality: German
- Born: 18 December 1934; Benneckenstein, Germany
- Died: 2 December 2014 (aged 79); Wernigerode, Germany

Sport
- Sport: Biathlon

Hans-Dieter Riechel (18 December 1934 – 2 December 2014) was a German biathlete. He competed in the 20 km individual event at the 1964 Winter Olympics.
