= Erich Schönbächler =

Swiss biathlete (1935–2022)

Personal information
- Nationality: Swiss
- Born: 6 September 1935 Einsiedeln, Switzerland
- Died: 6 August 2022 (aged 86)

Sport
- Sport: Biathlon

Erich Schönbächler (6 September 1935 – 6 August 2022) was a Swiss biathlete. He competed in the 20 km individual event at the 1964 Winter Olympics.
