= Sven-Olov Axelsson =

Swedish biathlete (born 1941)

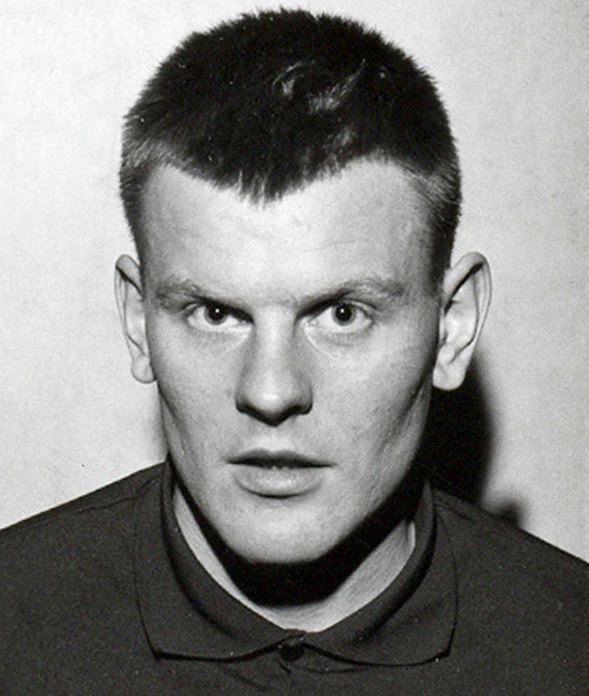

Personal information
- Born: 22 January 1941 (age 85) Dala-Floda, Sweden
- Height: 185 cm (6 ft 1 in)
- Weight: 72 kg (159 lb)

Sport
- Sport: Biathlon
- Club: Dala-Floda IF

Sven-Olov Axelsson (born 22 January 1941) is a retired Swedish biathlete. He competed in the 20 km event at the 1964 Winter Olympics and finished 17th.
