= Hansruedi Roth =

Swiss luger (born 1942)

Personal information
- Nationality: Swiss
- Born: 27 July 1942 (age 82)

Sport
- Sport: Luge

Hansruedi Roth (born 27 July 1942) is a Swiss luger. He competed in the men's doubles event at the 1964 Winter Olympics.
