= Jan-Axel Strøm =

Norwegian luger (born 1945)

Personal information
- Nationality: Norwegian
- Born: 6 September 1945 (age 79); Oslo, Norway

Sport
- Sport: Luge

Jan-Axel Strøm (born 6 September 1945) is a Norwegian luger. He participated at the 1964 Winter Olympics in Innsbruck, where he placed 19th singles and 10th in doubles (together with Christian Hallén-Paulsen).
