= SV Dynamo =

Former East German sports club

Coordinates: 52°31′1.17″N 13°24′54.37″E

- Founded: 27 March 1953; 73 years ago
- Dissolved: 1990; 36 years ago
- League: Olympics, World cup, European Championship Nat. League
- Team history: "I am willing to win!/ Ich bin gewillt zu siegen!" (motto)
- Based in: East Berlin, East Germany
- Arena: Palast der Republik, Dynamo-Sportforum, Altenberg bobsleigh, luge, and skeleton track, Dynamo Sports Hotel
- Stadium: Dynamo-Stadion (Dresden), Friedrich-Ludwig-Jahn-Sportpark, Heinz-Steyer-Stadion and others
- Colors: Claret and white/Claret and silver
- Owner: Ministry of the Interior of the GDR: Volkspolizei, Zollverwaltung, Ministry for State Security, Feuerwehr
- President: Erich Mielke
- Championships: 2.187 nat.; approx. 182 European cup medals approx. 324 World cup medals; approx. 215 Olympic medals

The Sportvereinigung Dynamo (German: Sportvereinigung Dynamo) (Dynamo Sports Association) was the sport association of the security agencies (Volkspolizei, Ministry for State Security, fire department and customs) of former East Germany.

The association was founded on 27 March 1953 and was headquartered in Hohenschönhausen in East Berlin. From the date of its inception, the President of SV Dynamo was the Minister of State Security Erich Mielke. The Minister of State Security served as First chairman of the association, while the Ministry of the Interior provided the Second chairman of the association. The Head of the Volkspolizei Karl Maron was elected as the first Second Chairman at the founding conference. The financial and material resources of the SV Dynamo were almost exclusively provided by the Ministry of State Security. Erich Mielke was dismissed as First chairman in December 1989. His position was not replaced. SV Dynamo was dissolved in 1990.

Dynamo was set up following the multi-sports club model developed in the Soviet Union and adopted throughout Eastern Europe. From the beginning it had an overtly political as well as sporting agenda and its many successes were always portrayed as a triumph of the German Democratic Republic (GDR). SV Dynamo was dissolved during the Peaceful Revolution. The association had a membership of over 280,000 members at its height. Athletes of the association enjoyed considerable success both in national and international competitions, winning for example more than 200 Olympic medals. After German reunification in 1990 the systematic doping of Dynamo athletes from 1971 until 1989 was revealed by the German media. Doping was done under the supervision of the Stasi and with full backing of the government.

== Organization ==
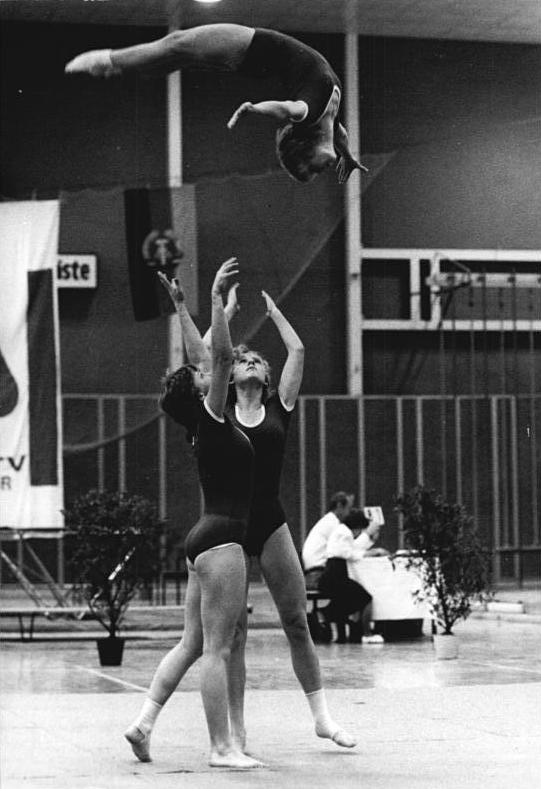
Acrobatics show in 1982

The SV Dynamo was divided into fifteen regional units, corresponding to the fifteen regional districts of the East Germany. Within each regional unit individual sports communities (SG) and sports clubs (SC) existed, with each sports community or club specializing in different disciplines. 290 sections were included in the association, such as SG Dynamo Dresden (football), SC Dynamo Hoppegarten (judo, shooting sports, parachuting), the SC Dynamo Klingenthal (Nordic skiing), SG Dynamo Luckenwalde (wrestling), SG Dynamo Potsdam (rowing and canoe sprint), SG Dynamo Weißwasser (ice hockey) and the SG Dynamo Zinnwald in Altenberg (biathlon, bobsleigh, luge, skeleton).

The most famous sports club of the SV Dynamo was probably the SC Dynamo Berlin, which offered most Olympic disciplines. The sports system was not designed for transfers, but on schedule. The athletes had to be viewed in their own country. Administrators and coaches from Dynamo Berlin were often sent to support their development. The district organizations, which bore the names of the districts they served, always wore the initials SV Dynamo.

For the training, there existed a basic plan. If the children themselves are not good at school, they were excluded from the training. The emphasis has been respected that the athletes had to pursue themselves the sporting ideology, because otherwise no success would have been guaranteed. Each year, the best Dynamo-athlete were voted. Few could win 50,- M when they themselves were those who chose the sportswoman/ sportsman of the year. Dynamo employed a planning cycle that set out the club's objectives for the upcoming four-year period.

=== Politics ===
The sports association was anti-fascist and communist in nature. Among its founders were former concentration camps prisoners and communist leaders in the fight against National socialists and Social Democrats during the era of the Weimar Republic.

Visits to the Soviet War Memorial in Treptower Park and the Sachsenhausen concentration camp, among other places, were common among the youth athletes of its teams. The names of murdered and deceased communists were given as honorary titles for the constituent clubs under the sports society, for example: SG Dynamo "Feliks E. Dzierzynski" Dresden or SG Dynamo "Dr. Richard Sorge" Erfurt.

There were also many hymns and odes written for SV Dynamo. Gerhard Kube, Helmut Baierl and Kurt Barthel wrote many poets about the society and its role as a builder of national sports.

The Central Management Office (German: Büro der Zentralen Leitung) (BdZL) of SV Dynamo had 1,400 members in 1989. A large majority of 1,000 were members of the Ministry of the Interior (MdI) and a smaller portion of 180 were members of the Ministry of State Security (MfS). Stasi Major General Heinz Pommer was the head of the BdZL from 1982 to 1989. The association was dissolved in early 1990.

=== SV Dynamo districts ===
Flag example

The organization of the society was along district lines as follows:

- Sportvereinigung Dynamo District - Organisation Rostock
- Sportvereinigung Dynamo District - Organisation Neubrandenburg
- Sportvereinigung Dynamo District - Organisation Schwerin
- Sportvereinigung Dynamo District - Organisation Magdeburg
- Sportvereinigung Dynamo District - Organisation Potsdam
- Sportvereinigung Dynamo District - Organisation Frankfurt Oder
- Sportvereinigung Dynamo District - Organisation East Berlin
- Sportvereinigung Dynamo District - Organisation Cottbus,
- Sportvereinigung Dynamo District - Organisation Halle
- Sportvereinigung Dynamo District - Organisation Leipzig
- Sportvereinigung Dynamo District - Organisation Erfurt
- Sportvereinigung Dynamo District - Organisation Gera
- Sportvereinigung Dynamo District - Organisation Suhl
- Sportvereinigung Dynamo District - Organisation Dresden
- Sportvereinigung Dynamo District - Organisation Karl-Marx-Stadt

The measure of the flags of the district clubs is 2.8 × 1.5 m, with, of course, the emblem of the SV with the name of the club in white and at the canton the DTSB arms.

== Members ==
Key to East German sporting success was a pyramid system with schoolchildren being assessed for athletic potential and the best (typically the top 2.5%) in each school-year being offered specialised coaching. A small fraction of those would go on to become the top adult athletes of the next generation. This model was initially derided in the West as a "sausage machine" but it has since been adopted in modified form by Australia, France, Spain and others with thousands of children being educated at specialised (often residential) sports schools rather than going through the normal high school system. Overall, 3.7 million athletes were in the GDR at the German Sports federation (DTSB) registered in many other successful clubs in 1989.

Members by year
Year	Adults	Children	Total
1953	23,162	none	23,162
1955	55,991	10,874	66,856
1958	90,160	18,846	109,006
1961	105,530	42,822	148,352
1966	118,651	54,691	173,306
1970	131,752	74,266	206,018
1972	139,013	85,295	224,308
1974	144,356	93,071	237,427
1975	146,127	96,666	242,793
1976	148,054	99,337	247,391
1983	170,000	110,000	280,000

== Trainers ==
Most coaches were also teachers or had other specific occupations. They were all in principle to ease members' fears before starting competitions. To overcome any problems developing, they could deal with them early (at the source) in order to eradicate this. At the same time, they were also the guardians of morality.

Trainers by year
Year	Level 1	Level 2	Level 3/4	Total
1964	none	none	none	9989
1965	none	none	none	9673
1966	6785	2466	1362	10613
1967	6717	2476	1489	10682
1968	7078	2731	1712	11521
1969	7536	3009	1915	12460
1970	7321	3211	2058	12590
1971	7215	3412	2119	12746
1972	7334	3598	2580	13512
1973	7394	3791	3016	14201
1974	11358	3906	3098	18362
1975	11812	3949	3407	19168
1976	12369	4219	3524	20112

== Doping controversies ==
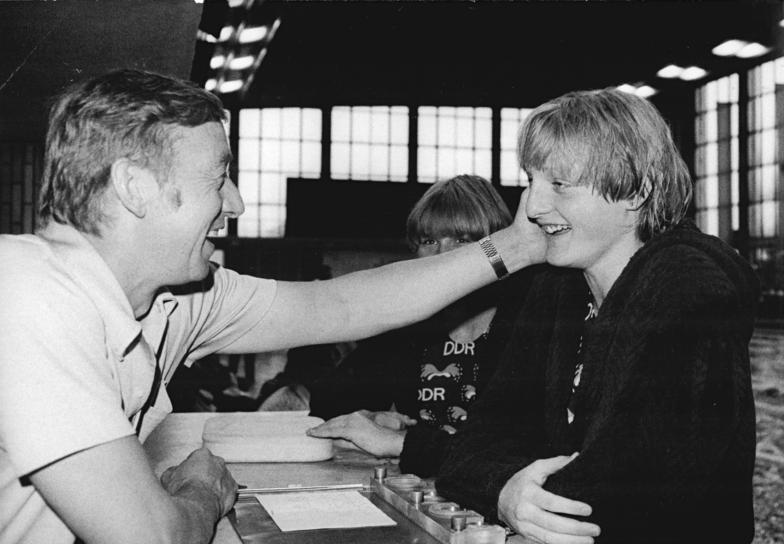
Birgit Meineke with coach Rolf Gläser

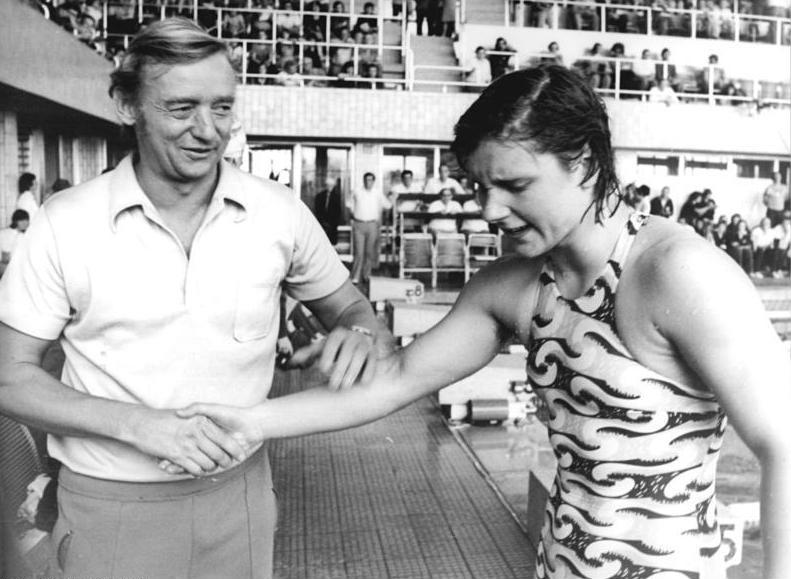
Rosemarie Gabriel with coach Rolf Gläser

SV Dynamo was especially singled out as a center for doping in the former East Germany. Many former club officials and some athletes found themselves charged after the dissolution of the country. A special page on the internet was created by doping victims trying to gain justice and compensation, listing people involved in doping at the club, the so-called Dynamo Liste.

State-endorsed doping began with the Cold War when every eastern bloc gold was an ideological victory. From 1974, Manfred Ewald, the head of the GDR's sports federation, imposed blanket doping. At the 1968 Mexico City Olympics, the country of 17 million collected nine gold medals. Four years later the total was 20 and in 1976 it doubled again to 40. Ewald was quoted as having told coaches, "They're still so young and don't have to know everything." He was given a 22-month suspended sentence, to the outrage of his victims.

Often, doping was carried out without the knowledge of the athletes, some of them as young as ten years of age. It is estimated that around 10,000 former athletes bear the physical and mental scars of years of drug abuse, one of them is Rica Reinisch, a triple Olympic champion and world record-setter at the Moscow Games in 1980, has since suffered numerous miscarriages and recurring ovarian cysts. Athletes like Renate Vogel, silver medalist at the 1972 Olympics in the swimming competitions, were told the injections were vitamins but failed to believe the explanation and quit her sport.

Two former SC Dynamo Berlin club doctors, Dieter Binus, chief of the national women's team from 1976 to 80, and Bernd Pansold, in charge of the sports medicine center in East-Berlin, were committed for trial for allegedly supplying 19 teenagers with illegal substances. Binus was sentenced in August, Pansold in December 1998 after both being found guilty of administering hormones to underage female athletes from 1975 to 1984.

Virtually no East German athlete ever failed an official drug test, though Stasi files show that many did, indeed, produced positive tests at Kreischa, the Saxon laboratory (German:Zentrale Dopingkontroll-Labor des Sportmedizinischen Dienstes) that was at the time approved by the International Olympic Committee, now called the Institute of Doping Analysis and Sports Biochemistry (IDAS).

The manufacturer of the drugs in former East Germany, Jenapharm, still found itself involved in numerous lawsuits from doping victims, being sued by almost 200 former athletes, as of 2005, fifteen years after the end of East Germany. Many of the substances handed out were, even under East German law, illegal.

Former athletes of SC Dynamo Berlin who publicly admitted to doping, accusing their coaches:

- Daniela Hunger
- Andrea Pollack
- Katharina Bullin
- Andreas Krieger

Former athletes of SC Dynamo Berlin disqualified for doping:

- Ilona Slupianek (Ilona Slupianek tested positive along with three Finnish athletes at the 1977 European Cup, becoming the only East German athlete ever to be convicted of doping). Based on the self-admission by Pollack, the United States Olympic Committee asked for the redistribution of gold medals won in the 1976 Olympics. Despite court rulings in Germany that substantiate claims of systematic doping by some East German swimmers, the IOC executive board announced that it has no intention of revising the Olympic record books. This is an understandable decision as it could otherwise trigger a flood of such claims involving former eastern bloc athletes. In rejecting the American petition on behalf of its women's medley relay team in Montreal and a similar petition from the British Olympic Association on behalf of Sharron Davies, the IOC made it clear that it wanted to discourage any such appeals in the future.

== Achievements ==
=== Olympics ===
Athletes of SV Dynamo won approximately 215 Olympic medals in a 37 years period. A review by SV Dynamo leaders after the 1972 Summer Olympics in Munich found that athletes of SV Dynamo won so many medals for East Germany that the sports association would have been placed on a ninth to tenth place on the unofficial list if the sports association had been a national team.

=== World championships ===
Athletes of SV Dynamo won approximately 324 World Cup medals in a 37 years period. The SV Dynamo won more World champion titles than hundreds of other nations (2008). The rowers won the most titles.

=== European championships ===
Athletes of SV Dynamo won approximately 182 European titles.

=== Championships ===
Athletes of SV Dynamo won altogether 2,187 titles in 35 sport-sections over a 37-year period. With 280,000 members, it is not surprising that the SV Dynamo multi-sport club has won many championships in East Germany, so that a separate category should be needed.

== Award items and badges ==
The highest award was a banner of Felix Dzerzhinsky

The SV Dynamo sports association awarded various signs, badges, medals and lapel pins to its members. The highest award was the title of Dzerzhinsky-Athlete (German: Dzierzynskisportler).

Needle of honor for adults

Needle of honor for children

Honorary title

Needle for very good work (1st version)

Needle for very good work (2nd version)

Badge for g.-/s.-/b.- niveau of militant combat sport

G.-/s.-/b.- needle for the best sports results (cops)

Champion's needle 1st version

Champion's needle 2nd version

Provincial victory - walking - deco - banner (best club)

=== The pin of the SG Dynamo Adlershof ===
The pin of the SG Dynamo Adlershof (German: Abzeichen der SG Dynamo Adlershof) was awarded by the SG Dynamo Adlershof. It was a joint badge with the SG Dynamo Adlerhof service focus in sports shooting. The badge (which also existed in embroidered form for track suits) shows the logo of the Sports Club Dynamoys on a burgundy granular base with a white "D". The words "SG Dynamo Adlershof" are written on a triangular tape surrounding the log.

=== The Badge of the 30th Conference of the leaders of the sports organizations in the protection and security institutions in the socialist countries ===
(German: Abzeichen der 30. Konferenz der Leitungen der Sportorganisationen der Schutz- und Sicherheitsorgane der sozialistischen Länder) The silver badge, which was designed with a pad printing, has a height of 34.6 mm and a width of 30 mm, shield-shaped superficial and shows the City Hall (German:Rotes Rathhaus) of East Berlin.

=== Brooch for Championships of the SG Dynamo Hohenschönhausen ===
(German: Brosche/ Meisternadel der SG Dynamo Berlin Hohenschönhausen) was awarded by the SG Dynamo Hohenschönhausen, an award from the Sports Club. The brooch of the championship in 1968 in medal form has a diameter of 34.6 mm and shows on their obverse four sports. These include volleyball, gymnastics, athletics, climbing on a military pentathlon by a soldier. Among these motifs, the inscription SG DYNAMO BERLIN-HOHENSCHÖNHAUSEN is readable. The reverse of the coin shows the centrally raised embossed inscription 15 years SV Dynamo which has an inscription from one to the upper right curved laurel wreath penetrated. At the top of the medal is an eyelet to which a 40.2 mm wide x 22.5 mm high clip, which should be placed on granular basic black, red and gold enamel. Center is the national emblem of the GDR imprinted on the logo of the Dynamo sports association, the winding "D" is seen. Above the upper band is a curved black field with the ribbon "MEISTER 1968". The needle is like Master of the medal shows of the year 1969, but on her lapel is a change in the inscription, which is readable "20 YEARS GDR" (German: 20 JAHRE DDR).

=== SC Dynamo Berlin emblem ===
The SC Dynamo Berlin emblem was a joining badge of the SC Dynamo Berlin. The badge of the SC Dynamo Berlin indicates a service focus on football, basketball, boxing, ice hockey, figure skating, speed skating, parachuting, handball, judo, athletics, equestrian, cycling, rowing, shooting, swimming, diving and gymnastics. The badges show the familiar logo of the Sports Club Dynamo on a burgundy background with the white convoluted "D". This is flanked both sides by a laurel wreath. At the bottom tip of the badge is on a black background of the logo to readable: Sportclub.

=== Award of 20 years Sports Club Dynamo ===
(German: Auszeichnung 20 Jahre Sportvereinigung Dynamo) was awarded by the SV Dynamo, an award of the Sports Club. The back of the badge is flat and displays a soldered horizontal stitched needle. This badge is round like a coin, and has a diameter of 39 mm. The logo of the SV Dynamo is in the lower right, a logo of the Soviet Union is in the top left, which is nearly identical to the German pedant. In the upper right side of the coin the inscription "50 JAHRE 20" is readable, the 50 is the anniversary of the "Soviet Union- Dynamo" and the 20 for the German. Next to two logos is shown an upward laurel wreath. The appearance of the lapels is unknown. Growth was the medal on a rectangular 28 mm wide and 11.5 mm high burgundy smooth and glossy protection, the left is the symbol of the hammer and sickle of the Soviet Union and the right to locate the state emblem of the GDR.

=== SG Dynamo Berlin Hohenschönhausen medal of the 15th anniversary of the SV Dynamo ===
The (German: Abzeichen der SG Dynamo Berlin Hohenschönhausen zum 15. Jahrestag der SV Dynamo) was awarded by the SG Dynamo Hohenschönhausen, an award of the Sports Club. The back of the badge is flat and displays a soldered horizontal stitched needle. The badge is shaped like a medal with a diameter of 39 mm and is made of enamel and is awarded according to the levels gold, silver or bronze. It shows on their obverse center, the symbolic representation of four sports, volleyball, gymnastics, athletics, climbing a Eskaladierwand with a soldier. Enclosed is the symbolism of a transcription SG DYNAMO BERLIN HOHENSCHÖNHAUSEN that determines the lower half of the coin, and the subsequent laurel branches on both sides. The reverse shows a laurel wreath on the other hand within the logos of the SV Dynamo (bottom right) and top left of the DTSB. Growth was the medal in a trapezoid-shaped plastic clip, the 32.5 mm wide and 9.7 mm in height at the front left side of the mortgaged. It shows the central symbol of the SV Dynamo flanked by laurel wreath and the words 1953 (left) and 1968 (right).

=== Insignia of the International shooting competitions ===
(German: Abzeichen der Internationalen Schießwettkämpfe) The Insignia of the International shooting competitions was awarded by the SV Dynamo. On the occasion of the 2nd International shooting, badges were donated. The badge has a shape similar to a gold coin, with dimensions spanning 28.6 mm high and 24.4 mm wide. The front of the badge shows a laurel wreath target, with two diagonally crossed rifles overlaid above it. At the bottom of the coin is the year in which the competition took place. At the top is the 'SV Dynamo' logo, which extends beyond the edge of the coin. The logo serves simultaneously as it braces for the suspension fixed in banner form, which was 10.6 mm high and 28.8 mm wide. It has an inscription reading III. / INT. SCHIESSWETTKÄMPFE / LEIPZIG.

== Gallery ==
=== Photos ===
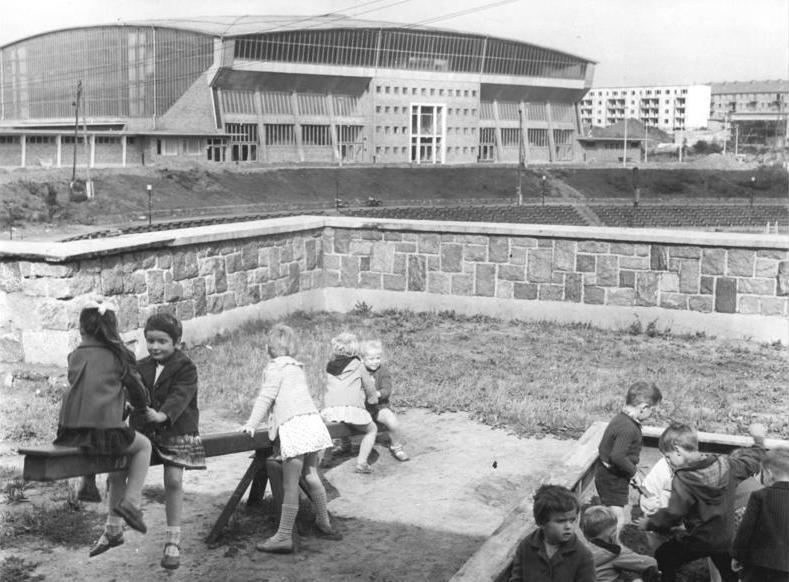
The multi-use hall in Schwerin.

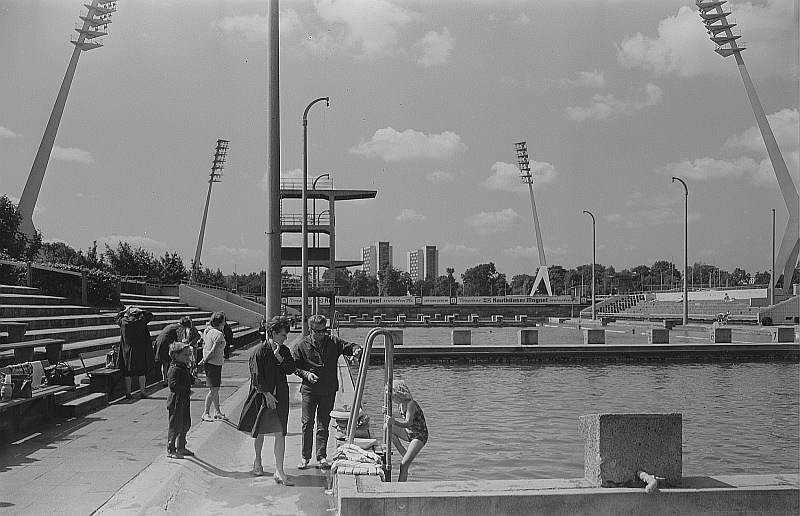
The Dynamo Stadium and bath in Dresden.

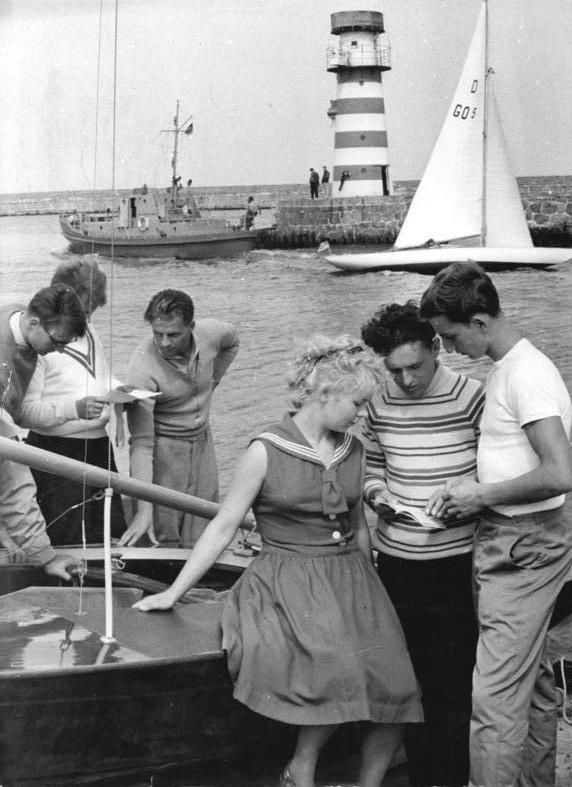
Sailing in Warnemünde.

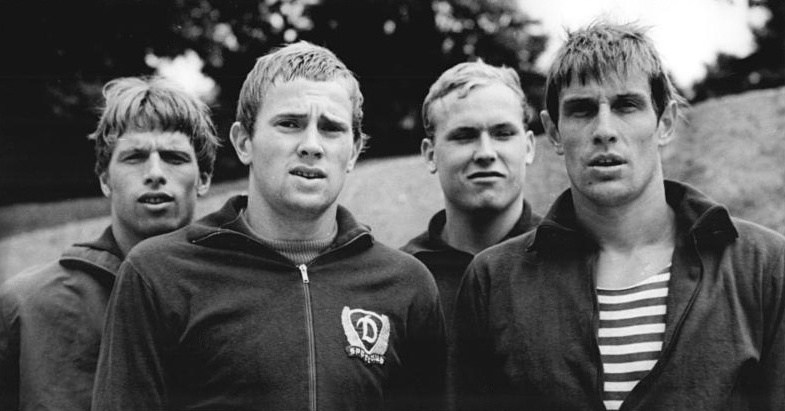
Swimmer

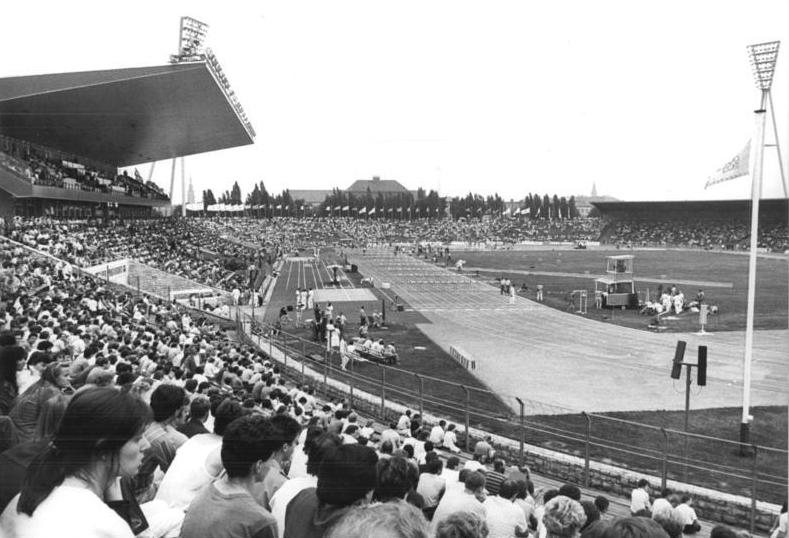
The Friedrich-Ludwig-Jahn-Stadion in East Berlin

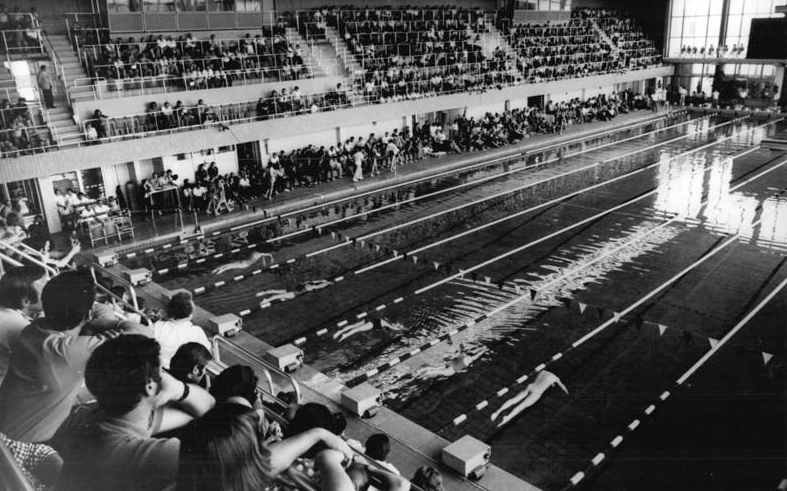
Indoor swimming pool at the Dynamo-Sportforum in East Berlin

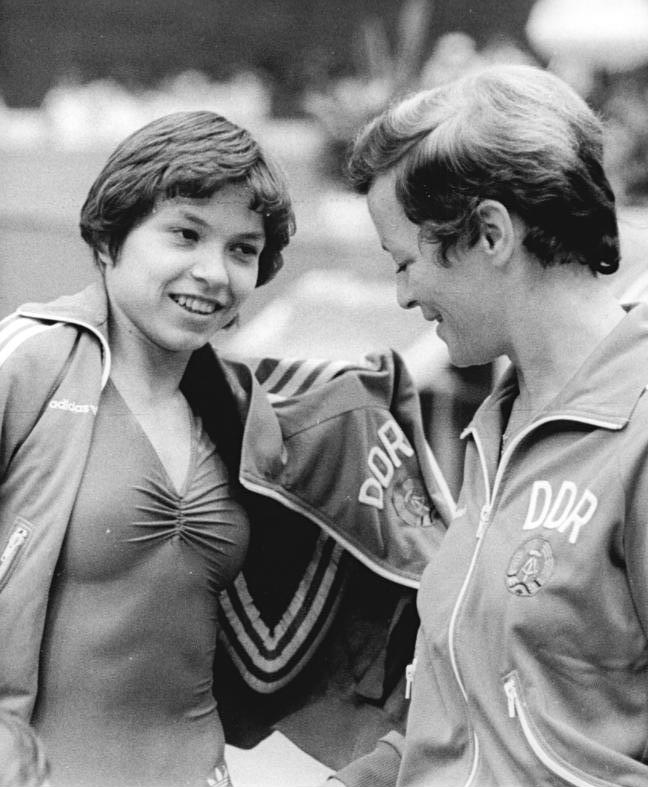
Gymnastics

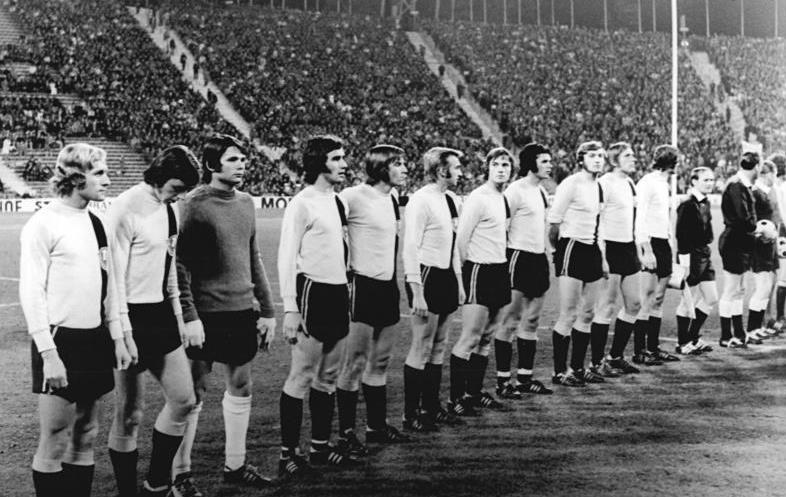
1973, Munich

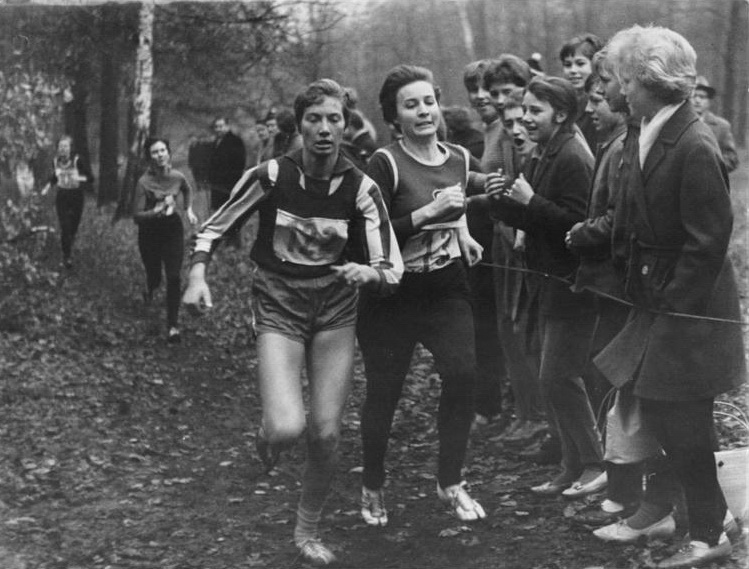
Cross country running

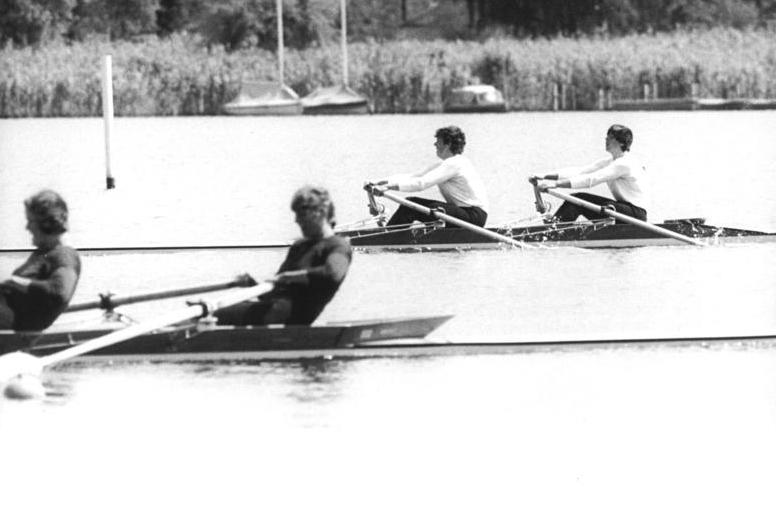
Rowing

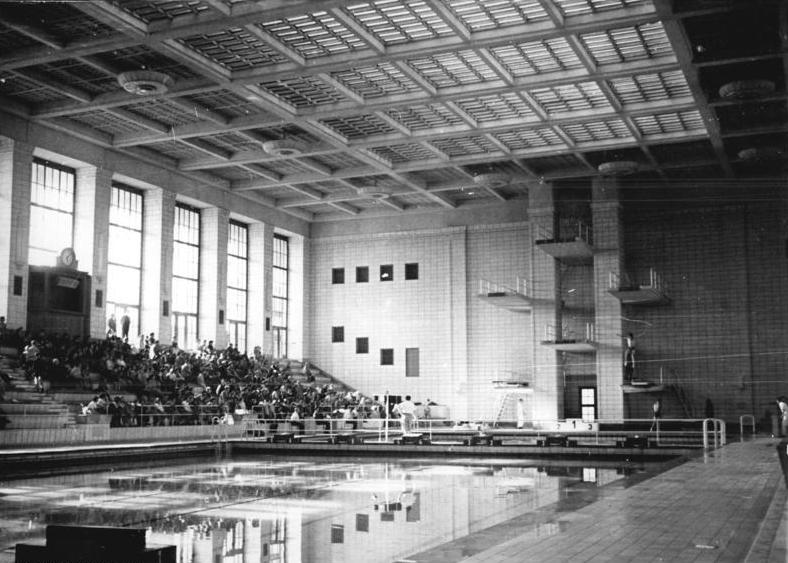
Indoor swimming pool Rostock

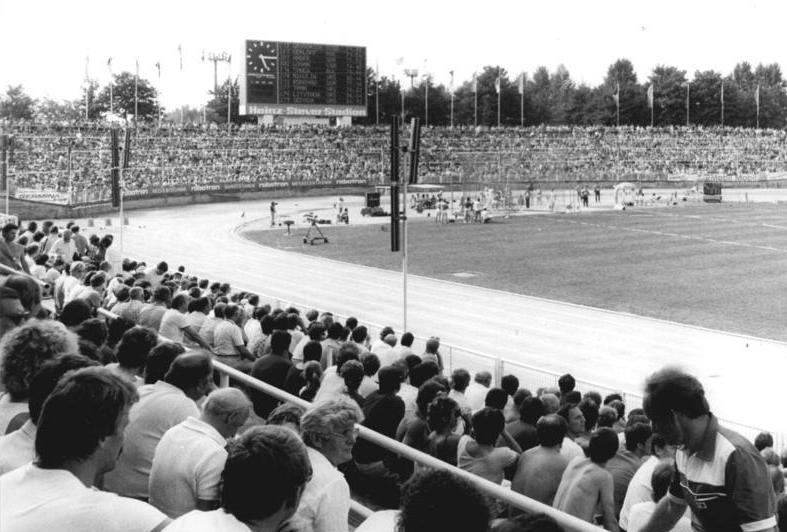
Dresden, Steyer-Stadium

== See also ==
- Use of performance-enhancing drugs in sport
- Doping in East Germany
- Dynamosport

== Literature ==
- Gläser, Andreas (1976). SV Dynamo Ein Almanach (in German). ASIN B0027432ZC.
- SV Dynamo Mut und Kraft (in German). Offizin Andersen Nexö Leipzig. 1984. ASIN none.
- Pickard, Ralph (2012). STASI Decorations and Memorabilia Volume II. Frontline Historical Publishing. ISBN 978-0-9797199-2-9 (English – Contains a 32-page Chapter on the Stasi and Dynamo)
- Humboldt - Universität zu Berlin Dissertation "Die Frühgeschichte der Sportvereinigung Dynamo. Hegemoniebestrebungen, Dominanzverhalten und das Rivalitätsverhältnis zur Armeesportvereinigung „Vorwärts“" Dissertation zur Erlangung des akademischen Grads Dr. phil. Philosophische Fakultät IV, Carmen Fechner 2012 (in German language)
