= Constantin Carabela =

Romanian biathlete (born 1940)

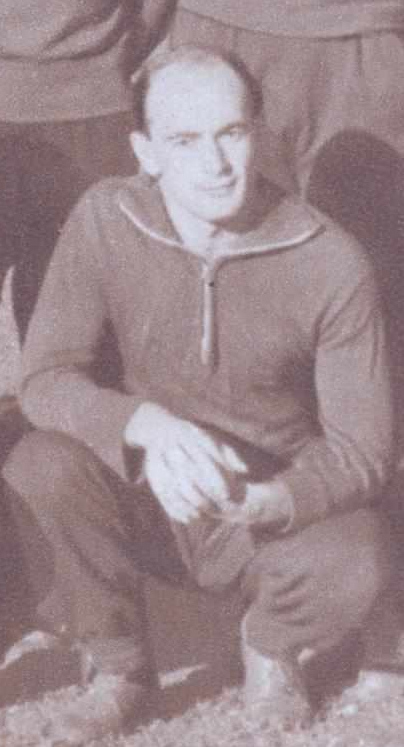
- Carabela in 1963

Personal information
- Nationality: Romanian
- Born: 21 July 1940 (age 85); Sinaia, Romania

Sport
- Sport: Biathlon

Constantin Carabela (born 21 July 1940) is a Romanian biathlete. He competed at the 1964 Winter Olympics, the 1968 Winter Olympics and the 1972 Winter Olympics.
