= Nicolae Bărbășescu =

Romanian biathlete (born 1940)

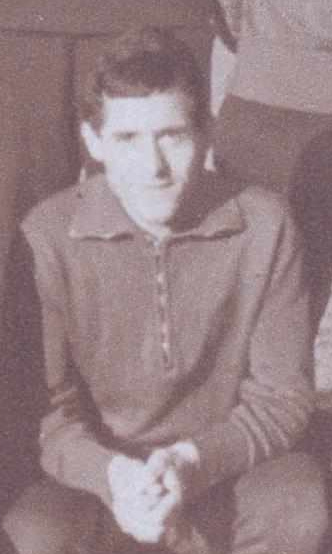
- Nicolae Bărbășescu

Personal information
- Nationality: Romanian
- Born: 19 September 1940 (age 84); Brașov, Romania

Sport
- Sport: Biathlon

Nicolae Bărbășescu (born 19 September 1940) is a Romanian biathlete. He competed at the 1964 Winter Olympics and the 1968 Winter Olympics.
