= Smržovka =

- Town
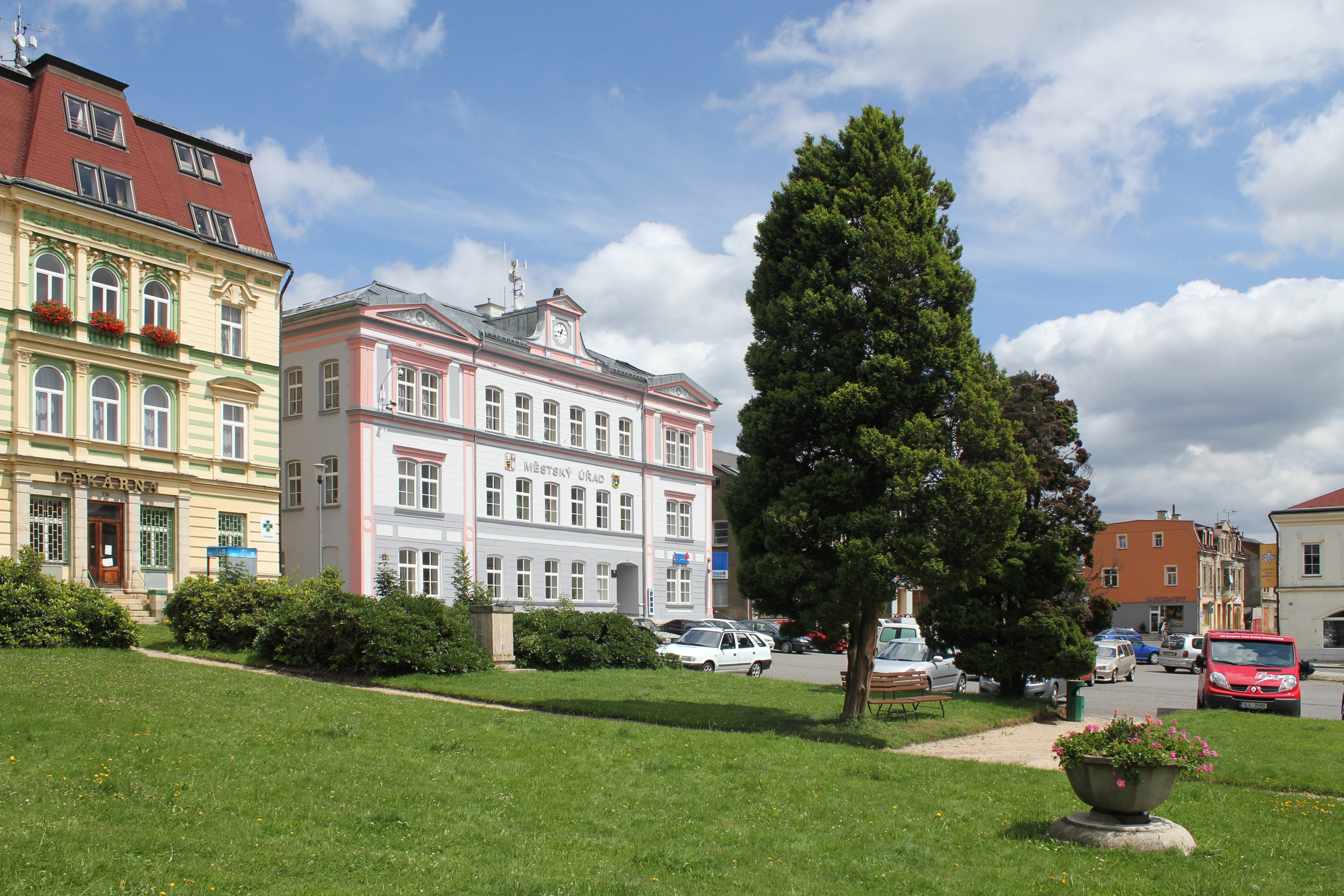
- The square Náměstí T. G. Masaryka

- Coat of arms

- Location in the Czech Republic
- Coordinates: 50°44′18″N 15°14′47″E
- Country: Czech Republic
- Region: Liberec
- District: Jablonec nad Nisou
- First mentioned: 1568

Government
  - Mayor: Marek Hotovec

Area
  - Total: 14.81 km^{2} (5.72 sq mi)
- Elevation: 585 m (1,919 ft)

Population (2026-01-01)
  - Total: 3,901
  - Density: 263.4/km^{2} (682.2/sq mi)
- Time zone: UTC+1 (CET)
  - Summer (DST): UTC+2 (CEST)
- Postal code: 468 51
- Website: www.smrzovka.cz

Smržovka (Czech pronunciation: [ˈsmr̩ʒofka]; German: Morchenstern) is a town in Jablonec nad Nisou District in the Liberec Region of the Czech Republic. It has about 3,900 inhabitants. It lies in the Jizera Mountains.

== Etymology ==
The name Smržovka was given to the town by overgrown mountain forest, where there was a large amount of morels (Czech: smrž, German: Morcheln).

== Geography ==
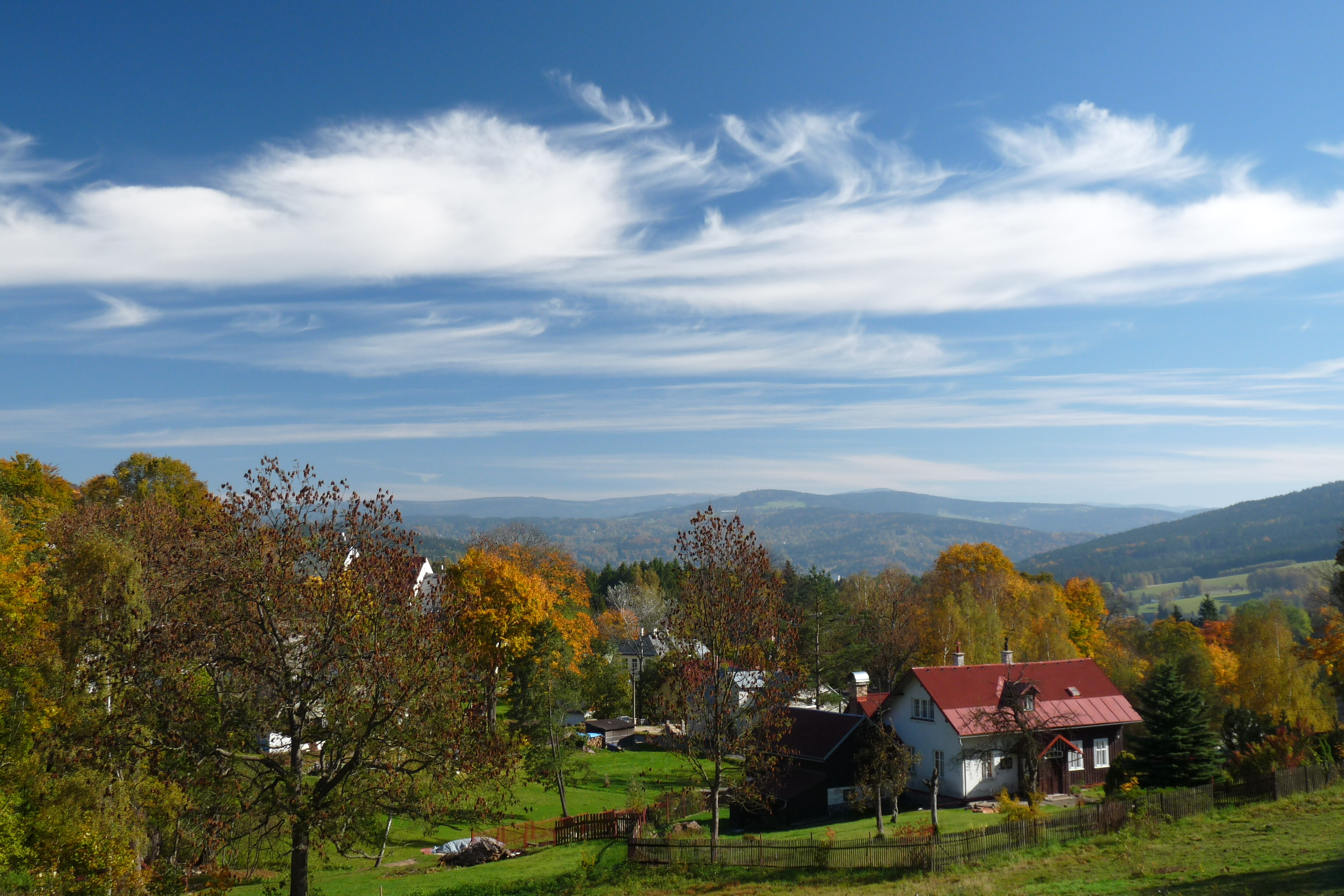
View of Smržovka

Smržovka is located about 5 kilometres (3 mi) east of Jablonec nad Nisou. It lies in the Jizera Mountains. The highest point is the mountain Černá studnice at 869 m (2,851 ft) above sea level. The Kamenice River flows along the northeastern municipal border.

== History ==
Smržovka was founded in the first half of the 16th century during the colonisation of the Jizera Mountains. The first written mention of the village is from 1568. The most common craft at that time was weaving. The area was part of the Semily estate, owned by the Smiřický family. In 1622, the estate was purchased by Albrecht von Wallenstein. In 1635, the Desfours family acquired Smržovka, which became a separate estate in 1662, and owned it until 1848.

In the 19th century, glassmaking developed in the town, which helped the rapid growth of the town. Unfavorable natural conditions made agriculture difficult and the town focused on industry. Smržovka became a market village in 1849. In 1868, Smržovka was promoted to a market town, and in 1905, it became a town. In the 1920s, Smržovka flourished and there was high employment. The textile and glass industry developed and 90% of the products were exported abroad. About three quarters of the population were ethnic Germans.

From 1938 to 1945, the town was annexed to Nazi Germany and administered as part of the Reichsgau Sudetenland. During the German occupation of Czechoslovakia in February and March 1945, the Germans operated a subcamp of the Gross-Rosen concentration camp, whose prisoners were 300 women. After World War II, the German-speaking population was expelled.

== Demographics ==
Historical population

Year	Pop.	±%
1869	4,551	—
1880	4,979	+9.4%
1890	5,919	+18.9%
1900	6,539	+10.5%
1910	7,602	+16.3%

Year	Pop.	±%
1921	6,614	−13.0%
1930	7,296	+10.3%
1950	4,161	−43.0%
1961	4,272	+2.7%
1970	3,747	−12.3%

Year	Pop.	±%
1980	3,526	−5.9%
1991	3,418	−3.1%
2001	3,430	+0.4%
2011	3,541	+3.2%
2021	3,771	+6.5%

Source: Censuses

== Economy ==
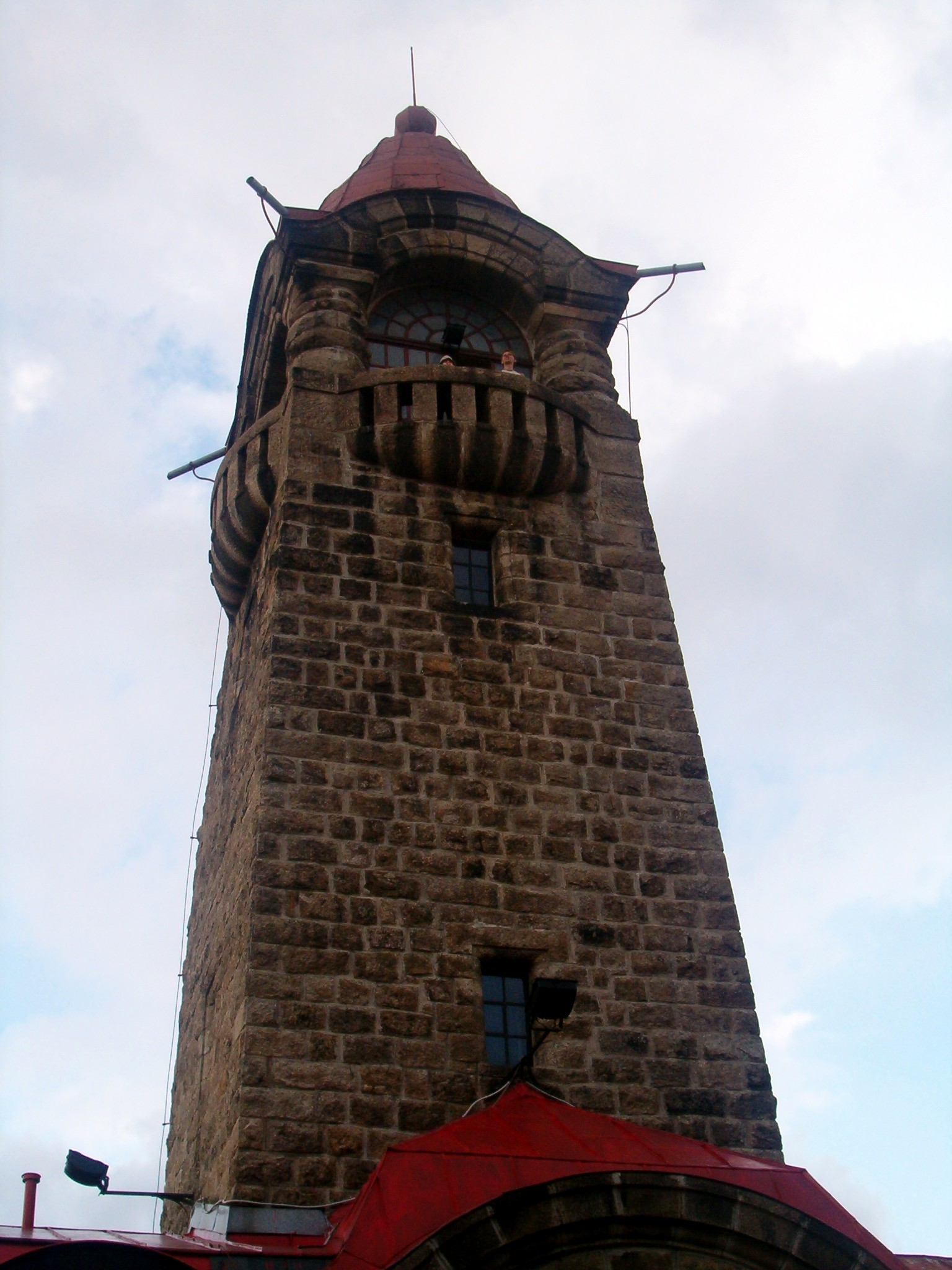
Černá studnice observation tower

In 1991, the Kaipan company, a Czech car manufacturer with a focus on sports roadsters, was founded here.

== Transport ==
Smržovka is located on the railway lines Liberec–Szklarska Poręba and Smržovka–Josefův Důl.

== Sights ==
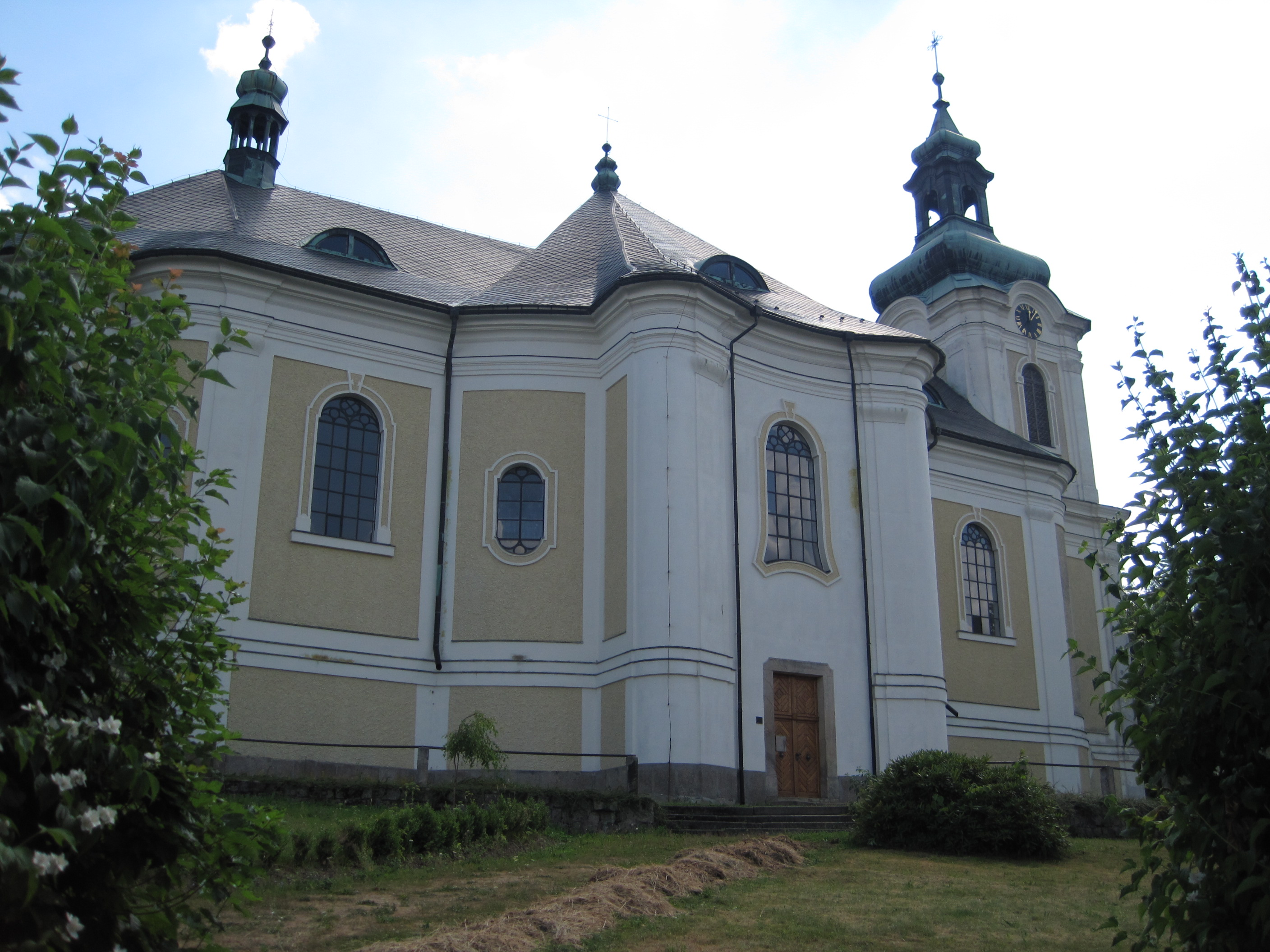
Church of Saint Michael the Archangel

The main landmark of the town is the Church of Saint Michael the Archangel. It was built in the Baroque style in 1767–1781.

On the mountain Černá studnice is the Černá studnice observation tower. It is a 26 m (85 ft) high stone tower, built in 1885–1886. It belongs to the highest stone observation towers in the Jizera Mountains.

== Notable people ==
- Horst Urban (1936–2010), luger
- Petr Urban (born 1960), illustrator, cartoonist and luger

== Twin towns – sister cities ==
Smržovka is twinned with:

- Rammenau, Germany
- Weidenberg, Germany

In addition to its twin towns, Smržovka also cooperates with Juchnowiec Kościelny in Poland, Plouhinec in France and Unsere Liebe Frau im Walde-St. Felix in Italy.
