= Gheorghe Cimpoia =

Romanian biathlete (born 1939)

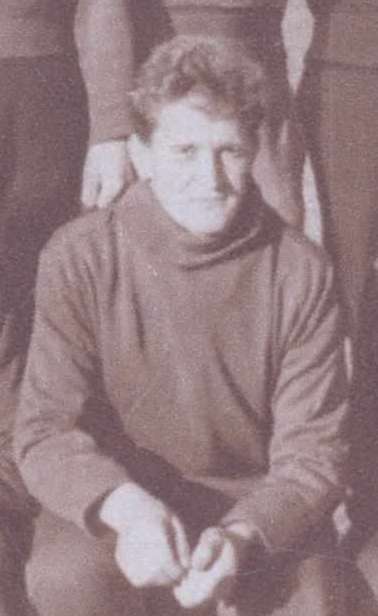
- Image of Cimpoia in 1963

Personal information
- Nationality: Romanian
- Born: 14 October 1939 (age 86) Râșnov, Romania

Sport
- Sport: Biathlon

Gheorghe Cimpoia (born 15 October 1939) is a Romanian biathlete. He competed at the 1964 Winter Olympics and the 1968 Winter Olympics.
