= Ice hockey at the 1968 Winter Olympics – Rosters =

The ice hockey team rosters at the 1968 Winter Olympics consisted of the following players:

== Austria ==
Head coach: (Czechoslovakia) Jiri Hanzl

No.	Pos.	Name	Height	Weight	Birthdate	Team
-	F	Günther Burkhart	5 ft 6 in (168 cm)	137 lb (62 kg)	November 18, 1942 (aged 25)	(Austria) Innsbrucker EV
-	F	Hermann Erhart	5 ft 7 in (170 cm)	176 lb (80 kg)	July 12, 1943 (aged 24)	(Austria) Innsbrucker EV
-	D	Gerhard Felfernig	5 ft 9 in (175 cm)	201 lb (91 kg)	May 18, 1944 (aged 23)	(Austria) Klagenfurter AC
-	D	Gerhard Hausner	6 ft 1 in (185 cm)	198 lb (90 kg)	September 25, 1947 (aged 20)	(Austria) Wiener EV
-	F	Dieter Kalt Sr. (C)	-	-	July 29, 1941 (aged 26)	(Austria) ATSE Graz
-	F	Klaus Kirchbaumer	5 ft 9 in (175 cm)	159 lb (72 kg)	October 7, 1944 (aged 23)	(Austria) Innsbrucker EV
-	F	Heinz Knoflach	5 ft 6 in (168 cm)	176 lb (80 kg)	July 30, 1945 (aged 22)	(Austria) Innsbrucker EV
-	F	Walter König	5 ft 7 in (170 cm)	150 lb (68 kg)	June 9, 1944 (aged 23)	(Austria) Klagenfurter AC
-	G	Karl Pregl	5 ft 11 in (180 cm)	187 lb (85 kg)	May 7, 1944 (aged 23)	(Austria) Klagenfurter AC
-	F	Sepp Puschnig	5 ft 10 in (178 cm)	196 lb (89 kg)	September 12, 1946 (aged 21)	(Austria) Klagenfurter AC
-	F	Paul Samonig	5 ft 9 in (175 cm)	172 lb (78 kg)	September 2, 1947 (aged 20)	(Austria) Klagenfurter AC
-	D	Gerd Schager	6 ft 1 in (185 cm)	190 lb (86 kg)	June 18, 1944 (aged 23)	(Austria) Klagenfurter AC
-	G	Franz Schilcher	5 ft 9 in (175 cm)	170 lb (77 kg)	August 19, 1943 (aged 24)	(Austria) ATSE Graz
-	F	Heinz Schupp	5 ft 10 in (178 cm)	163 lb (74 kg)	February 26, 1942 (aged 25)	(Austria) Klagenfurter AC
-	F	Josef Schwitzer	-	-	October 31, 1946 (aged 21)	(Austria) Innsbrucker EV
-	F	Adelbert St. John	5 ft 7 in (170 cm)	154 lb (70 kg)	October 6, 1931 (aged 36)	(Austria) Klagenfurter AC

== Canada ==
Head coach: Jackie McLeod

No.	Pos.	Name	Height	Weight	Birthdate	Team
-	F	Herb Pinder	5 ft 11 in (180 cm)	170 lb (77 kg)	December 24, 1946 (aged 21)	(Canada) Saskatoon Blades
1	G	Ken Broderick	5 ft 10 in (178 cm)	161 lb (73 kg)	February 16, 1942 (aged 26)	(Canada) Winnipeg Nationals
2	D	Terry O'Malley	6 ft 0 in (183 cm)	181 lb (82 kg)	October 21, 1940 (aged 27)	N/A
3	F	Paul Conlin	5 ft 10 in (178 cm)	185 lb (84 kg)	January 26, 1943 (aged 25)	N/A
4	D	Barry MacKenzie	6 ft 0 in (183 cm)	190 lb (86 kg)	August 16, 1941 (aged 26)	(Canada) Ottawa Nationals
5	D	Brian Glennie	6 ft 1 in (185 cm)	196 lb (89 kg)	August 29, 1946 (aged 21)	(Canada) Ottawa Nationals
7	F	Gary Dineen	5 ft 10 in (178 cm)	174 lb (79 kg)	December 24, 1943 (aged 24)	(Canada) Ottawa Nationals
8	F	Roger Bourbonnais	5 ft 9 in (175 cm)	163 lb (74 kg)	October 26, 1942 (aged 25)	N/A
9	F	Fran Huck	5 ft 7 in (170 cm)	165 lb (75 kg)	December 4, 1945 (aged 22)	(Canada) Ottawa Nationals
10	D	Marshall Johnston (C)	5 ft 11 in (180 cm)	181 lb (82 kg)	June 6, 1941 (aged 26)	(Canada) Winnipeg Nationals
11	F	Ted Hargreaves	5 ft 11 in (180 cm)	179 lb (81 kg)	November 4, 1943 (aged 24)	N/A
12	F	Billy MacMillan	5 ft 11 in (180 cm)	172 lb (78 kg)	March 7, 1943 (aged 24)	(Canada) Ottawa Nationals
15	F	Gerry Pinder	5 ft 8 in (173 cm)	165 lb (75 kg)	September 15, 1948 (aged 19)	(Canada) Winnipeg Nationals
16	F	Ray Cadieux	5 ft 10 in (178 cm)	170 lb (77 kg)	December 27, 1941 (aged 26)	N/A
17	F	Steve Monteith	5 ft 11 in (180 cm)	170 lb (77 kg)	September 21, 1943 (aged 24)	(Canada) Toronto Varsity Blues
18	F	Danny O'Shea	6 ft 1 in (185 cm)	190 lb (86 kg)	June 15, 1945 (aged 22)	(Canada) Winnipeg Nationals
20	F	Morris Mott	5 ft 8 in (173 cm)	165 lb (75 kg)	May 25, 1946 (aged 21)	(Canada) Winnipeg Nationals
21	G	Wayne Stephenson	5 ft 9 in (175 cm)	174 lb (79 kg)	January 29, 1945 (aged 23)	(Canada) Winnipeg Nationals

== Czechoslovakia ==
Head coach: Vladimír Kostka

Assistant coach: Jaroslav Pitner

No.	Pos.	Name	Height	Weight	Birthdate	Team
1	G	Vladimír Nadrchal	5 ft 8 in (173 cm)	159 lb (72 kg)	March 4, 1938 (aged 29)	(Czechoslovakia) TJ Brno
2	D	Karel Masopust	5 ft 11 in (180 cm)	176 lb (80 kg)	October 4, 1942 (aged 25)	(Czechoslovakia) TJ Sparta Praha
4	D	Oldřich Machač	5 ft 9 in (175 cm)	198 lb (90 kg)	April 18, 1946 (aged 21)	(Czechoslovakia) TJ Brno
5	D	Josef Horešovský	6 ft 1 in (185 cm)	196 lb (89 kg)	July 18, 1946 (aged 21)	(Czechoslovakia) TJ Sparta Praha
7	D	František Pospíšil	6 ft 0 in (183 cm)	185 lb (84 kg)	April 2, 1944 (aged 23)	(Czechoslovakia) TJ Kladno
8	F	František Ševčík	5 ft 7 in (170 cm)	168 lb (76 kg)	January 11, 1942 (aged 26)	(Czechoslovakia) TJ Brno
9	F/D	Jozef Golonka (C)	5 ft 9 in (175 cm)	165 lb (75 kg)	January 6, 1938 (aged 30)	(Czechoslovakia) HC Slovan Bratislava
10	F	Jan Hrbatý	5 ft 7 in (170 cm)	154 lb (70 kg)	January 20, 1942 (aged 26)	(Czechoslovakia) ASD Dukla Jihlava
11	F	Jan Klapáč	5 ft 9 in (175 cm)	168 lb (76 kg)	February 27, 1941 (aged 26)	(Czechoslovakia) ASD Dukla Jihlava
12	F	Jiří Kochta	6 ft 0 in (183 cm)	183 lb (83 kg)	October 11, 1946 (aged 21)	(Czechoslovakia) ASD Dukla Jihlava
14	F	Václav Nedomanský	6 ft 2 in (188 cm)	205 lb (93 kg)	March 14, 1944 (aged 23)	(Czechoslovakia) HC Slovan Bratislava
15	F	Josef Černý	5 ft 8 in (173 cm)	165 lb (75 kg)	October 18, 1939 (aged 28)	(Czechoslovakia) TJ Brno
16	F	Jaroslav Jiřík	5 ft 7 in (170 cm)	176 lb (80 kg)	December 10, 1939 (aged 28)	(Czechoslovakia) TJ Brno
17	D	Jan Suchý	5 ft 9 in (175 cm)	170 lb (77 kg)	October 10, 1944 (aged 23)	(Czechoslovakia) ASD Dukla Jihlava
18	G	Vladimír Dzurilla	5 ft 10 in (178 cm)	205 lb (93 kg)	August 2, 1942 (aged 25)	(Czechoslovakia) HC Slovan Bratislava
19	F	Petr Hejma	5 ft 9 in (175 cm)	163 lb (74 kg)	June 27, 1944 (aged 23)	(Czechoslovakia) TJ Sparta Praha
20	F	Jiří Holík	5 ft 11 in (180 cm)	176 lb (80 kg)	July 9, 1944 (aged 23)	(Czechoslovakia) ASD Dukla Jihlava
21	F	Jan Havel	5 ft 9 in (175 cm)	176 lb (80 kg)	November 10, 1942 (aged 25)	(Czechoslovakia) TJ Sparta Praha

== East Germany ==
Head coach: Rudolf Schmieder

No.	Pos.	Name	Height	Weight	Birthdate	Team
1	D	Wilfried Sock	5 ft 6 in (168 cm)	170 lb (77 kg)	July 2, 1944 (aged 23)	(East Germany) SG Dynamo Weißwasser
2	D	Helmut Novy	5 ft 7 in (170 cm)	159 lb (72 kg)	July 31, 1944 (aged 23)	(East Germany) SG Dynamo Weißwasser
3	D	Dieter Voigt	5 ft 10 in (178 cm)	176 lb (80 kg)	February 18, 1939 (aged 28)	(East Germany) SC Dynamo Berlin
4	D	Wolfgang Plotka	5 ft 8 in (173 cm)	170 lb (77 kg)	May 16, 1941 (aged 26)	(East Germany) SC Dynamo Berlin
5	D/F	Dietmar Peters	5 ft 9 in (175 cm)	165 lb (75 kg)	August 8, 1949 (aged 18)	(East Germany) SC Empor Rostock
6	F	Manfred Buder	5 ft 8 in (173 cm)	174 lb (79 kg)	March 24, 1936 (aged 31)	(East Germany) SG Dynamo Weißwasser
7	F	Peter Prusa	5 ft 11 in (180 cm)	179 lb (81 kg)	February 19, 1944 (aged 23)	(East Germany) SC Dynamo Berlin
8	F	Bernd Hiller	5 ft 8 in (173 cm)	192 lb (87 kg)	February 26, 1942 (aged 25)	(East Germany) SC Dynamo Berlin
9	F	Joachim Ziesche (C)	6 ft 4 in (193 cm)	201 lb (91 kg)	July 3, 1939 (aged 28)	(East Germany) SC Dynamo Berlin
10	F	Bernd Karrenbauer	5 ft 8 in (173 cm)	183 lb (83 kg)	March 5, 1944 (aged 23)	(East Germany) SC Dynamo Berlin
11	F	Rüdiger Noack	6 ft 0 in (183 cm)	172 lb (78 kg)	November 30, 1944 (aged 23)	(East Germany) SG Dynamo Weißwasser
12	F	Lothar Fuchs	5 ft 10 in (178 cm)	203 lb (92 kg)	June 18, 1941 (aged 26)	(East Germany) ASK Vorwärts Crimmitschau
13	F	Bernd Poindl	5 ft 9 in (175 cm)	183 lb (83 kg)	August 30, 1941 (aged 26)	(East Germany) SG Dynamo Weißwasser
14	F	Dieter Kratzsch	5 ft 11 in (180 cm)	192 lb (87 kg)	June 2, 1939 (aged 28)	(East Germany) ASK Vorwärts Crimmitschau
15	F/D	Hartmut Nickel	6 ft 0 in (183 cm)	181 lb (82 kg)	November 16, 1944 (aged 23)	(East Germany) SC Dynamo Berlin
16	G	Klaus Hirche	5 ft 11 in (180 cm)	183 lb (83 kg)	June 7, 1939 (aged 28)	(East Germany) SG Dynamo Weißwasser
17	G	Dieter Pürschel	6 ft 0 in (183 cm)	198 lb (90 kg)	February 7, 1941 (aged 27)	(East Germany) SC Dynamo Berlin
18	D	Ulrich Noack	6 ft 0 in (183 cm)	179 lb (81 kg)	November 2, 1942 (aged 25)	(East Germany) SG Dynamo Weißwasser

== Finland ==
Head coach: (Czechoslovakia) Augustin Bubník

No.	Pos.	Name	Height	Weight	Birthdate	Team
1	G	Urpo Ylönen	5 ft 8 in (173 cm)	165 lb (75 kg)	May 25, 1943 (aged 24)	(Finland) TuTo
2	D	Ilpo Koskela	5 ft 10 in (178 cm)	163 lb (74 kg)	January 29, 1945 (aged 23)	(Finland) Lahden Reipas
3	D	Juha Rantasila	6 ft 0 in (183 cm)	181 lb (82 kg)	June 5, 1945 (aged 22)	(Finland) HIFK
4	D	Paavo Tirkkonen	5 ft 11 in (180 cm)	187 lb (85 kg)	October 2, 1947 (aged 20)	(Finland) SaPKo
5	D	Lalli Partinen	6 ft 2 in (188 cm)	220 lb (100 kg)	August 20, 1941 (aged 26)	(Finland) SaiPa
6	D	Seppo Lindström	5 ft 11 in (180 cm)	187 lb (85 kg)	May 16, 1941 (aged 26)	(Finland) TuTo
7	D	Pekka Kuusisto	5 ft 6 in (168 cm)	172 lb (78 kg)	January 17, 1945 (aged 23)	(Finland) KOOVEE
8	F	Juhani Wahlsten	5 ft 9 in (175 cm)	181 lb (82 kg)	January 13, 1938 (aged 30)	(Finland) TPS
9	F	Matti Keinonen	5 ft 9 in (175 cm)	163 lb (74 kg)	November 6, 1941 (aged 26)	(Finland) Lukko
10	F	Matti Reunamäki (C)	-	-	July 25, 1940 (aged 27)	(Finland) KOOVEE
11	F	Kari Johansson	5 ft 11 in (180 cm)	174 lb (79 kg)	February 15, 1947 (aged 21)	(Finland) TuTo
12	F	Lasse Oksanen	6 ft 0 in (183 cm)	181 lb (82 kg)	December 7, 1942 (aged 25)	(Finland) Ilves
13	F	Esa Peltonen	5 ft 10 in (178 cm)	176 lb (80 kg)	February 25, 1947 (aged 20)	(Finland) Upon Pallo
14	F	Jorma Peltonen	5 ft 10 in (178 cm)	176 lb (80 kg)	January 11, 1944 (aged 24)	(Finland) Ilves
15	F	Matti Harju	5 ft 8 in (173 cm)	159 lb (72 kg)	July 14, 1943 (aged 24)	(Finland) Upon Pallo
16	F	Pekka Leimu	5 ft 7 in (170 cm)	174 lb (79 kg)	April 11, 1947 (aged 20)	(Finland) Ilves
17	F	Veli-Pekka Ketola	6 ft 2 in (188 cm)	238 lb (108 kg)	March 28, 1948 (aged 19)	(Finland) Ässät
18	G	Pentti Koskela	5 ft 7 in (170 cm)	181 lb (82 kg)	November 27, 1945 (aged 22)	(Finland) KOOVEE

== France ==
Head coach: (Canada) Gaëtan LaLiberte

No.	Pos.	Name	Height	Weight	Birthdate	Team
1	G	Bernard Deschamps	5 ft 8 in (173 cm)	148 lb (67 kg)	May 29, 1944 (aged 23)	(France) US Métro
2	D	Bernard Cabanis	5 ft 9 in (175 cm)	174 lb (79 kg)	June 23, 1950 (aged 17)	(France) Français Volants Paris
3	D	René Blanchard	6 ft 0 in (183 cm)	163 lb (74 kg)	July 12, 1947 (aged 20)	(France) Saint-Gervais
4	D	Claude Blanchard	5 ft 10 in (178 cm)	163 lb (74 kg)	May 25, 1945 (aged 22)	(France) AC Boulogne-Billancourt
5	D	Joël Gauvin	6 ft 1 in (185 cm)	174 lb (79 kg)	July 24, 1939 (aged 28)	(France) Ours douphinois
6	D	Joël Godeau	6 ft 2 in (188 cm)	179 lb (81 kg)	August 6, 1945 (aged 22)	(France) AC Boulogne-Billancourt
7	D	Philippe Lacarrière	5 ft 10 in (178 cm)	174 lb (79 kg)	April 20, 1938 (aged 29)	(France) Français Volants Paris
8	F	Gérard Faucomprez	5 ft 11 in (180 cm)	159 lb (72 kg)	October 9, 1944 (aged 23)	(France) AC Boulogne-Billancourt
9	F	Gilbert Itzicsohn	5 ft 8 in (173 cm)	143 lb (65 kg)	August 17, 1944 (aged 23)	(France) AC Boulogne-Billancourt
10	F	Gilbert Lèpre	5 ft 6 in (168 cm)	148 lb (67 kg)	February 6, 1945 (aged 23)	(France) AC Boulogne-Billancourt
11	F	Michel Caux	5 ft 10 in (178 cm)	148 lb (67 kg)	August 30, 1946 (aged 21)	(France) Chamonix
12	F/D	Patrick Pourtanel	5 ft 10 in (178 cm)	183 lb (83 kg)	February 8, 1946 (aged 22)	N/A
14	F	Patrick Francheterre	5 ft 9 in (175 cm)	165 lb (75 kg)	November 19, 1948 (aged 19)	(France) Croix
15	F	Alain Mazza	5 ft 6 in (168 cm)	143 lb (65 kg)	October 14, 1948 (aged 19)	(France) Chamonix
16	F	Charles Liberman	5 ft 7 in (170 cm)	159 lb (72 kg)	July 8, 1945 (aged 22)	(France) Gap
17	F	Daniel Grando	5 ft 7 in (170 cm)	143 lb (65 kg)	June 20, 1948 (aged 19)	(France) Saint-Gervais
18	F	Olivier Préchac	5 ft 9 in (175 cm)	148 lb (67 kg)	January 5, 1945 (aged 23)	(France) Français Volants Paris
20	G	Jean-Claude Sozzi	5 ft 9 in (175 cm)	154 lb (70 kg)	October 31, 1943 (aged 24)	N/A

== Norway ==
Head coach: Egil Bjerklund

No.	Pos.	Name	Height	Weight	Birthdate	Team
1	G	Kåre Østensen	6 ft 0 in (183 cm)	181 lb (82 kg)	December 5, 1943 (aged 24)	(Norway) Tigrene
2	D	Thor Martinsen	5 ft 7 in (170 cm)	176 lb (80 kg)	July 12, 1945 (aged 22)	(Norway) Sparta Sarpsborg
3	D/F	Terje Steen	5 ft 11 in (180 cm)	174 lb (79 kg)	January 13, 1944 (aged 24)	(Norway) Vålerenge
4	D/F	Odd Syversen	5 ft 11 in (180 cm)	165 lb (75 kg)	February 5, 1945 (aged 23)	(Norway) Vålerenge
5	D	Tor Gundersen	-	-	September 15, 1935 (aged 32)	(Norway) Vålerenge
6	F	Arne Mikkelsen	6 ft 0 in (183 cm)	168 lb (76 kg)	July 23, 1944 (aged 23)	(Norway) Vålerenge
7	F	Rodney Riise	6 ft 1 in (185 cm)	181 lb (82 kg)	December 21, 1942 (aged 25)	(Norway) Vålerenge
8	F	Christian Petersen	5 ft 6 in (168 cm)	143 lb (65 kg)	December 21, 1937 (aged 30)	(Norway) Gamlebyen
9	F	Steinar Bjølbakk	6 ft 1 in (185 cm)	181 lb (82 kg)	September 6, 1946 (aged 21)	(Norway) Vålerenge
10	F	Olav Dalsøren (C)	5 ft 11 in (180 cm)	183 lb (83 kg)	September 8, 1938 (aged 29)	(Norway) Tigrene
11	F	Terje Thoen	6 ft 1 in (185 cm)	181 lb (82 kg)	April 23, 1944 (aged 23)	N/A
12	F	Trygve Bergeid	5 ft 11 in (180 cm)	187 lb (85 kg)	March 30, 1942 (aged 25)	(Norway) Isbjørnene
13	F	Per Skjerven Olsen	5 ft 9 in (175 cm)	163 lb (74 kg)	September 26, 1939 (aged 28)	(Norway) Vålerenge
14	F	Svein Haagensen	6 ft 0 in (183 cm)	165 lb (75 kg)	November 23, 1939 (aged 28)	(Norway) Hasle-Løren
15	F	Bjørn Johansen	5 ft 9 in (175 cm)	176 lb (80 kg)	February 3, 1944 (aged 24)	N/A
16	F	Georg Smefjell	5 ft 10 in (178 cm)	154 lb (70 kg)	June 9, 1937 (aged 30)	(Norway) Tigrene
17	D	Svein Norman Hasen	5 ft 7 in (170 cm)	187 lb (85 kg)	April 18, 1943 (aged 24)	(Norway) Vålerenge
18	G	Harald Bråthen	-	-	May 24, 1944 (aged 23)	N/A

== Japan ==
Head coach: Tadeo Nakazima

No.	Pos.	Name	Height	Weight	Birthdate	Team
1	G	Katsuji Morishima	5 ft 9 in (175 cm)	146 lb (66 kg)	October 22, 1942 (aged 25)	(Japan) Iwakura Tomakomai
2	G	Toshimitsu Otsubo	5 ft 7 in (170 cm)	148 lb (67 kg)	April 4, 1945 (aged 22)	N/A
3	D	Hisashi Kasai	5 ft 9 in (175 cm)	154 lb (70 kg)	April 11, 1943 (aged 24)	(Japan) Seibu Railway Team
4	D	Isao Asai	5 ft 7 in (170 cm)	163 lb (74 kg)	December 25, 1942 (aged 25)	(Japan) Iwakura Tomakomai
5	D	Toru Itabashi	5 ft 9 in (175 cm)	161 lb (73 kg)	June 6, 1946 (aged 21)	(Japan) Iwakura Tomakomai
6	D	Michihiro Sato	5 ft 6 in (168 cm)	150 lb (68 kg)	November 18, 1943 (aged 24)	(Japan) Iwakura Tomakomai
7	D	Takaaki Kaneiri	6 ft 0 in (183 cm)	194 lb (88 kg)	January 2, 1943 (aged 25)	N/A
8	D	Kenji Toriyabe	5 ft 7 in (170 cm)	154 lb (70 kg)	February 16, 1943 (aged 25)	(Japan) Oji Seishi
9	F	Toru Okajima	5 ft 5 in (165 cm)	143 lb (65 kg)	January 21, 1943 (aged 25)	(Japan) Iwakura Tomakomai
10	F	Koji Iwamoto	5 ft 8 in (173 cm)	148 lb (67 kg)	January 22, 1942 (aged 26)	(Japan) Iwakura Tomakomai
11	F	Minoru Ito	5 ft 7 in (170 cm)	159 lb (72 kg)	March 26, 1948 (aged 19)	(Japan) Iwakura Tomakomai
12	F	Kazuo Matsuda	5 ft 3 in (160 cm)	143 lb (65 kg)	May 7, 1941 (aged 26)	N/A
13	F	Yutaka Ebina	5 ft 6 in (168 cm)	139 lb (63 kg)	April 26, 1943 (aged 24)	(Japan) Iwakura Tomakomai
14	F	Takeshi Akiba	5 ft 8 in (173 cm)	154 lb (70 kg)	May 4, 1944 (aged 23)	(Japan) Iwakura Tomakomai
15	F	Kimihisa Kudo	5 ft 5 in (165 cm)	157 lb (71 kg)	September 6, 1939 (aged 28)	N/A
16	F	Takao Hikigi	5 ft 9 in (175 cm)	159 lb (72 kg)	October 30, 1944 (aged 23)	(Japan) Oji Seishi
17	F	Mamoru Takashima (C)	5 ft 5 in (165 cm)	137 lb (62 kg)	March 3, 1938 (aged 29)	N/A
18	F	Nobuhiro Araki	5 ft 7 in (170 cm)	159 lb (72 kg)	January 10, 1944 (aged 24)	(Japan) Oji Seishi

== Romania ==
Head coach: Mihai Flamaropol

Assistant coach: Constantin Tico

No.	Pos.	Name	Height	Weight	Birthdate	Team
1	G	Mihai Stoiculescu	5 ft 10 in (178 cm)	165 lb (75 kg)	April 25, 1948 (aged 19)	(Romania) Sportul Studentesc
2	D	Ştefan Ionescu	5 ft 6 in (168 cm)	168 lb (76 kg)	February 17, 1935 (aged 33)	(Romania) Steaua București
3	D	Zoltán Czáka (C)	5 ft 10 in (178 cm)	176 lb (80 kg)	December 2, 1932 (aged 35)	(Romania) Steaua București
4	D	Dezső Varga	5 ft 10 in (178 cm)	176 lb (80 kg)	May 14, 1939 (aged 28)	(Romania) Steaua București
5	D	Zoltán Făgăraş	6 ft 1 in (185 cm)	183 lb (83 kg)	January 11, 1942 (aged 26)	(Romania) Dinamo București
6	F	Iuliu Szabo	5 ft 6 in (168 cm)	152 lb (69 kg)	December 1, 1940 (aged 27)	N/A
7	F	Ștefan Texe	5 ft 7 in (170 cm)	152 lb (69 kg)	June 29, 1947 (aged 20)	N/A
8	F	Geza Szabo	5 ft 5 in (165 cm)	146 lb (66 kg)	December 1, 1940 (aged 27)	N/A
9	F	Ion Başa	5 ft 10 in (178 cm)	165 lb (75 kg)	June 4, 1944 (aged 23)	(Romania) Dinamo București
10	F	Aurel Moiș	-	-	August 29, 1948 (aged 19)	(Romania) Constructorul Bucharest
11	F	Alexandru Calamar	5 ft 9 in (175 cm)	154 lb (70 kg)	June 20, 1941 (aged 26)	N/A
12	F	Valentin Stefanov	5 ft 10 in (178 cm)	152 lb (69 kg)	October 4, 1944 (aged 23)	(Romania) Steaua București
13	F	Ioan Gheorghiu	5 ft 9 in (175 cm)	146 lb (66 kg)	March 5, 1947 (aged 20)	(Romania) Steaua București
14	D/F	Vasile Boldescu	5 ft 10 in (178 cm)	176 lb (80 kg)	July 23, 1941 (aged 26)	(Romania) Dinamo București
15	F	Eduard Pană	5 ft 8 in (173 cm)	163 lb (74 kg)	May 28, 1944 (aged 23)	(Romania) Dinamo București
16	D	Răzvan Schiau	6 ft 1 in (185 cm)	185 lb (84 kg)	October 17, 1944 (aged 23)	N/A
17	F	Iulian Florescu	5 ft 10 in (178 cm)	154 lb (70 kg)	October 23, 1943 (aged 24)	(Romania) Dinamo București
20	G	Constantin Dumitraş	5 ft 7 in (170 cm)	150 lb (68 kg)	January 23, 1946 (aged 22)	(Romania) Dinamo București

== United States ==
Head coach: (Canada) Murray Williamson

No.	Pos.	Name	Height	Weight	Birthdate	Team
1	G	Pat Rupp	5 ft 9 in (175 cm)	179 lb (81 kg)	August 12, 1942 (aged 25)	(United States) Dayton Gems
2	D	Lou Nanne (C)	6 ft 0 in (183 cm)	181 lb (82 kg)	June 2, 1941 (aged 26)	(United States) Rochester Mustangs
3	D	Bruce Riutta	6 ft 3 in (191 cm)	196 lb (89 kg)	October 14, 1944 (aged 23)	(United States) Michigan Tech Huskies
4	D/F	Herb Brooks (C)	5 ft 10 in (178 cm)	165 lb (75 kg)	August 5, 1937 (aged 30)	(United States) U.S. Nationals
5	D/F	Don Ross	5 ft 11 in (180 cm)	183 lb (83 kg)	October 11, 1942 (aged 25)	(United States) U.S. Nationals
6	D	Paul Hurley	6 ft 0 in (183 cm)	190 lb (86 kg)	July 12, 1946 (aged 21)	(United States) Concord Eastern Olympics
6	D	Thomas Hurley	6 ft 1 in (185 cm)	201 lb (91 kg)	August 29, 1944 (aged 23)	N/A
7	D	Bob Paradise	5 ft 9 in (175 cm)	176 lb (80 kg)	April 22, 1944 (aged 23)	(United States) Minnesota Nationals
8	F	Doug Volmar	5 ft 11 in (180 cm)	176 lb (80 kg)	January 9, 1945 (aged 23)	(United States) Michigan State Spartans
9	F	Leonard Lilyholm	5 ft 8 in (173 cm)	165 lb (75 kg)	April 1, 1941 (aged 26)	(United States) Rochester Mustangs
10	F	John Morrison	5 ft 11 in (180 cm)	185 lb (84 kg)	April 6, 1945 (aged 22)	(United States) Yale Bulldogs
12	F	Jack Dale	5 ft 9 in (175 cm)	181 lb (82 kg)	December 19, 1945 (aged 22)	(United States) Minnesota Nationals
14	F	Larry Pleau	6 ft 1 in (185 cm)	185 lb (84 kg)	June 29, 1947 (aged 20)	(Canada) Montreal Junior Canadiens
15	F	Craig Falkman	5 ft 11 in (180 cm)	209 lb (95 kg)	August 1, 1943 (aged 24)	(United States) Rochester Mustangs
16	F	John Cunniff	6 ft 1 in (185 cm)	196 lb (89 kg)	July 9, 1944 (aged 23)	(United States) Fort Worth Wings
18	D	Robert Gaudreau	6 ft 1 in (185 cm)	181 lb (82 kg)	March 8, 1944 (aged 23)	(United States) Minnesota Nationals
20	F	Larry Stordahl	6 ft 1 in (185 cm)	181 lb (82 kg)	October 23, 1942 (aged 25)	(United States) Rochester Mustangs
23	G	Jim Logue	6 ft 0 in (183 cm)	196 lb (89 kg)	March 25, 1939 (aged 28)	(United States) Concord Eastern Olympics

== Soviet Union ==
Head coach: Arkadi Chernyshyev

Assistant coach: Anatoly Tarasov, Viktor Tikhonov

No.	Pos.	Name	Height	Weight	Birthdate	Team
1	G	Viktor Konovalenko	5 ft 8 in (173 cm)	168 lb (76 kg)	November 3, 1938 (aged 29)	(Soviet Union) Torpedo Gorky
2	D	Vitali Davydov	5 ft 8 in (173 cm)	161 lb (73 kg)	April 1, 1939 (aged 28)	(Soviet Union) Dynamo Moskva
3	D	Oleg Zaytsev	5 ft 10 in (178 cm)	187 lb (85 kg)	August 4, 1939 (aged 28)	(Soviet Union) CSKA Moskva
4	D	Viktor Blinov	5 ft 9 in (175 cm)	181 lb (82 kg)	September 1, 1945 (aged 22)	(Soviet Union) Spartak Moskva
5	D	Alexander Ragulin	6 ft 1 in (185 cm)	220 lb (100 kg)	May 5, 1941 (aged 26)	(Soviet Union) CSKA Moskva
6	D	Igor Romishevsky	5 ft 10 in (178 cm)	185 lb (84 kg)	March 25, 1940 (aged 27)	(Soviet Union) CSKA Moskva
8	F	Veniamin Alexandrov	5 ft 11 in (180 cm)	174 lb (79 kg)	April 18, 1937 (aged 30)	(Soviet Union) CSKA Moskva
9	F	Boris Mayorov (C)	5 ft 9 in (175 cm)	152 lb (69 kg)	February 11, 1938 (aged 30)	(Soviet Union) Spartak Moskva
10	F	Yevgeni Mishakov	5 ft 9 in (175 cm)	194 lb (88 kg)	February 22, 1941 (aged 26)	(Soviet Union) CSKA Moskva
11	F	Anatoli Firsov	5 ft 9 in (175 cm)	154 lb (70 kg)	February 1, 1941 (aged 27)	(Soviet Union) CSKA Moskva
12	F	Viktor Polupanov	5 ft 10 in (178 cm)	181 lb (82 kg)	January 1, 1946 (aged 22)	(Soviet Union) CSKA Moskva
14	F	Yevgeni Zimin	5 ft 8 in (173 cm)	181 lb (82 kg)	August 6, 1947 (aged 20)	(Soviet Union) Spartak Moskva
15	D	Viktor Kuzkin	5 ft 11 in (180 cm)	194 lb (88 kg)	July 6, 1940 (aged 27)	(Soviet Union) CSKA Moskva
16	F	Anatoli Ionov	5 ft 11 in (180 cm)	174 lb (79 kg)	May 23, 1939 (aged 28)	(Soviet Union) CSKA Moskva
17	F	Vladimir Vikulov	5 ft 9 in (175 cm)	172 lb (78 kg)	July 20, 1946 (aged 21)	(Soviet Union) CSKA Moskva
18	F	Vyacheslav Starshinov	5 ft 8 in (173 cm)	181 lb (82 kg)	May 6, 1940 (aged 27)	(Soviet Union) Spartak Moskva
19	F	Yuri Moiseyev	5 ft 7 in (170 cm)	161 lb (73 kg)	July 15, 1940 (aged 27)	(Soviet Union) CSKA Moskva
20	G	Viktor Zinger	5 ft 8 in (173 cm)	154 lb (70 kg)	October 29, 1941 (aged 26)	(Soviet Union) Spartak Moskva

== Sweden ==
Head coach: Arne Strömberg

No.	Pos.	Name	Height	Weight	Birthdate	Team
1	G	Leif Holmqvist	5 ft 9 in (175 cm)	172 lb (78 kg)	November 12, 1942 (aged 25)	(Sweden) AIK
2	G	Hans Dahllöf	5 ft 8 in (173 cm)	154 lb (70 kg)	January 25, 1941 (aged 27)	(Sweden) Brynäs IF
3	D	Lars-Erik Sjöberg	5 ft 8 in (173 cm)	165 lb (75 kg)	May 4, 1944 (aged 23)	(Sweden) Leksands IF
4	D	Roland Stoltz	6 ft 2 in (188 cm)	187 lb (85 kg)	August 1, 1931 (aged 36)	(Sweden) Djurgårdens IF
5	D	Bert-Ola Nordlander	5 ft 11 in (180 cm)	187 lb (85 kg)	August 12, 1938 (aged 29)	(Sweden) AIK
6	D	Nils Johansson	5 ft 11 in (180 cm)	157 lb (71 kg)	July 24, 1938 (aged 29)	(Sweden) Modo AIK
7	D	Lennart Svedberg	6 ft 0 in (183 cm)	168 lb (76 kg)	February 29, 1944 (aged 23)	(Sweden) Mora IK
8	D	Arne Carlsson	6 ft 3 in (191 cm)	192 lb (87 kg)	January 5, 1943 (aged 25)	(Sweden) Västra Frölunda IF
9	F	Björn Palmqvist	5 ft 11 in (180 cm)	176 lb (80 kg)	March 15, 1944 (aged 23)	(Sweden) Djurgårdens IF
10	F	Folke Bengtsson	5 ft 11 in (180 cm)	172 lb (78 kg)	April 24, 1944 (aged 23)	(Sweden) Leksands IF
11	F	Carl-Göran Öberg	6 ft 0 in (183 cm)	176 lb (80 kg)	December 24, 1938 (aged 29)	(Sweden) Djurgårdens IF
12	F	Lars-Göran Nilsson	5 ft 10 in (178 cm)	165 lb (75 kg)	March 9, 1944 (aged 23)	(Sweden) Brynäs IF
13	F	Håkan Wickberg	5 ft 8 in (173 cm)	174 lb (79 kg)	February 3, 1943 (aged 25)	(Sweden) Brynäs IF
14	F	Tord Lundström	6 ft 1 in (185 cm)	179 lb (81 kg)	March 4, 1945 (aged 22)	(Sweden) Brynäs IF
15	D	Henrik Hedlund	6 ft 0 in (183 cm)	183 lb (83 kg)	April 7, 1945 (aged 22)	(Sweden) Västra Frölunda IF
16	F	Leif Henriksson	6 ft 1 in (185 cm)	172 lb (78 kg)	May 26, 1943 (aged 24)	(Sweden) Västra Frölunda IF
17	F	Svante Granholm	5 ft 11 in (180 cm)	165 lb (75 kg)	March 15, 1947 (aged 20)	(Sweden) Västra Frölunda IF
18	F	Roger Olsson	6 ft 2 in (188 cm)	187 lb (85 kg)	January 30, 1944 (aged 24)	(Sweden) Västra Frölunda IF

== West Germany ==
Head coach: Markus Egen, (Canada) Ed Reigle

No.	Pos.	Name	Height	Weight	Birthdate	Team
1	G	Günther Knauss	5 ft 9 in (175 cm)	148 lb (67 kg)	February 14, 1943 (aged 25)	(Germany) EV Füssen
2	D	Leonhard Waitl	5 ft 10 in (178 cm)	174 lb (79 kg)	April 5, 1939 (aged 28)	(Germany) FC Bayern München
3	D	Heinz Bader (C)	5 ft 9 in (175 cm)	159 lb (72 kg)	October 10, 1940 (aged 27)	(Germany) EC Bad Tölz
4	D	Otto Schneitberger	5 ft 7 in (170 cm)	161 lb (73 kg)	September 29, 1939 (aged 28)	(Germany) Düsseldorfer EG
5	D	Johannes Schichtl	5 ft 10 in (178 cm)	163 lb (74 kg)	April 8, 1943 (aged 24)	(Germany) EC Bad Tölz
6	D	Josef Völk	5 ft 9 in (175 cm)	163 lb (74 kg)	December 3, 1948 (aged 19)	(Germany) EV Füssen
7	F	Ernst Köpf	5 ft 10 in (178 cm)	179 lb (81 kg)	February 10, 1940 (aged 28)	(Germany) Augsburger EV
8	F	Gustav Hanig	5 ft 8 in (173 cm)	152 lb (69 kg)	November 5, 1945 (aged 22)	(Germany) EV Füssen
9	F	Manfred Gmeiner	5 ft 9 in (175 cm)	165 lb (75 kg)	October 2, 1941 (aged 26)	(Germany) Mannheimer ERC
10	F	Peter Lax	5 ft 10 in (178 cm)	172 lb (78 kg)	November 7, 1941 (aged 26)	(Germany) EC Bad Tölz
11	F	Heinz Weisenbach	5 ft 10 in (178 cm)	163 lb (74 kg)	August 30, 1945 (aged 22)	(Germany) EV Füssen
12	F	Sepp Reif	5 ft 11 in (180 cm)	187 lb (85 kg)	September 5, 1937 (aged 30)	(Germany) Düsseldorfer EG
14	G	Josef Schramm	5 ft 11 in (180 cm)	190 lb (86 kg)	June 5, 1938 (aged 29)	(Germany) EV Landshut
15	F	Bernd Kuhn	5 ft 10 in (178 cm)	185 lb (84 kg)	August 17, 1944 (aged 23)	(Germany) EV Füssen
16	F	Lorenz Funk	6 ft 2 in (188 cm)	198 lb (90 kg)	March 17, 1947 (aged 20)	(Germany) EC Bad Tölz
17	F	Horst Meindl	5 ft 7 in (170 cm)	159 lb (72 kg)	February 6, 1946 (aged 22)	(Germany) EV Füssen
18	F	Alois Schloder	6 ft 0 in (183 cm)	181 lb (82 kg)	August 11, 1947 (aged 20)	(Germany) EV Landshut
19	D	Rudolf Thanner	5 ft 11 in (180 cm)	172 lb (78 kg)	August 20, 1944 (aged 23)	(Germany) EV Füssen

== Yugoslavia ==
Head coach: (Czechoslovakia) Oldrich Mlcoch

No.	Pos.	Name	Height	Weight	Birthdate	Team
-	F	Slavko Beravs	5 ft 10 in (178 cm)	172 lb (78 kg)	June 19, 1946 (aged 21)	N/A
-	F	Albin Felc	5 ft 9 in (175 cm)	150 lb (68 kg)	May 17, 1941 (aged 26)	N/A
-	G	Anton Jože Gale	5 ft 10 in (178 cm)	181 lb (82 kg)	March 26, 1944 (aged 23)	(Socialist Federal Republic of Yugoslavia) Olimpija Ljubljana
-	F	Miroslav Gojanović	5 ft 9 in (175 cm)	157 lb (71 kg)	April 20, 1949 (aged 18)	N/A
-	F	Rudi Hiti	5 ft 10 in (178 cm)	172 lb (78 kg)	November 4, 1946 (aged 21)	(Socialist Federal Republic of Yugoslavia) HK Jesenice
-	F/D	Bogo Jan	5 ft 7 in (170 cm)	161 lb (73 kg)	February 20, 1944 (aged 23)	N/A
-	D	Ivo Jan	5 ft 7 in (170 cm)	159 lb (72 kg)	April 10, 1942 (aged 25)	N/A
-	D	Vlado Jug	6 ft 2 in (188 cm)	201 lb (91 kg)	April 6, 1947 (aged 20)	N/A
-	F	Ciril Klinar	5 ft 11 in (180 cm)	201 lb (91 kg)	May 9, 1937 (aged 30)	(Socialist Federal Republic of Yugoslavia) Olimpija Ljubljana
-	G	Rudolf Knez	5 ft 11 in (180 cm)	198 lb (90 kg)	September 12, 1944 (aged 23)	N/A
-	F	Janez Mlakar	5 ft 9 in (175 cm)-	159 lb (72 kg)	May 31, 1944 (aged 23)	N/A
-	D	Ivo Ratej	5 ft 7 in (170 cm)	163 lb (74 kg)	September 11, 1941 (aged 26)	(Socialist Federal Republic of Yugoslavia) Medveščak Zagreb
-	D	Viktor Ravnik	5 ft 11 in (180 cm)	205 lb (93 kg)	October 19, 1941 (aged 26)	N/A
-	D	Franc-Rado Razinger	5 ft 7 in (170 cm)	152 lb (69 kg)	December 3, 1944 (aged 23)	N/A
-	F	Boris Renaud	5 ft 9 in (175 cm)	168 lb (76 kg)	January 2, 1946 (aged 22)	(Socialist Federal Republic of Yugoslavia) Medveščak Zagreb
-	F	Franc Smolej	5 ft 10 in (178 cm)	168 lb (76 kg)	July 18, 1940 (aged 27)	N/A
-	F	Roman Smolej	5 ft 9 in (175 cm)	172 lb (78 kg)	September 6, 1946 (aged 21)	N/A
-	F	Viktor Tišler	5 ft 11 in (180 cm)	187 lb (85 kg)	November 30, 1941 (aged 26)	N/A

== Sources ==
- Duplacey, James (1998). Total Hockey: The official encyclopedia of the National Hockey League. Total Sports. ISBN 0-8362-7114-9.
- Podnieks, Andrew (2010). IIHF Media Guide & Record Book 2011. Moydart Pres.
- Hockey Hall Of Fame page on the 1968 Olympics
- Wallechinsky, David (1988). The Complete Book of the Olympics. Penguin Books. pp. 614. ISBN 0-14-010771-1.
- Jeux Olympiques 1968
