= List of Olympic men's ice hockey players for Austria =

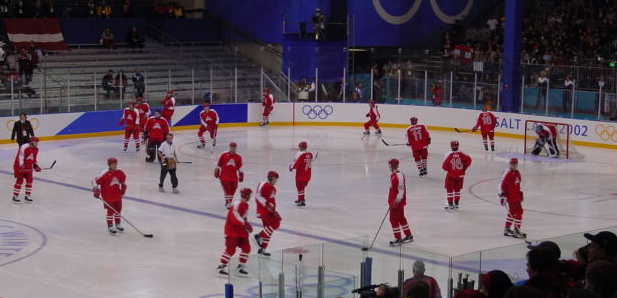
The Austrian national team at the 2002 Winter Olympics.

The list of Olympic men's ice hockey players for Austria consists of 150 skaters and 18 goaltenders. Men's ice hockey tournaments have been staged at the Olympic Games since 1920 (it was introduced at the 1920 Summer Olympics, and was permanently added to the Winter Olympic Games in 1924). Austria has participated in 13 tournaments, the first in 1928 and the most recent in 2014. Austria has hosted the Winter Olympics twice, in 1964 and 1976 Winter Olympics; both times Innsbruck served as the host city. Austria has never won a medal in ice hockey, with their highest finish being fifth in 1928.

Eight players have played in three separate Olympics, while Sepp Puschnig has played in the most games, 19 across three tournaments. Puschnig is tied with Del St. John for most goals scored, with 9, while Saint John has the most career assists, 7, and points, 16. Puschnig is the only player who has been inducted into the International Ice Hockey Federation Hall of Fame, though Dieter Kalt Sr. has been inducted as a builder.

== Key ==
General terms
Term	Definition
GP	Games played
IIHFHOF	International Ice Hockey Federation Hall of Fame
Olympics	Number of Olympic Games tournaments
Ref(s)	Reference(s)

Goaltender statistical abbreviations
Abbreviation	Definition
W	Wins
L	Losses
T	Ties
Min	Minutes played
SO	Shutouts
GA	Goals against
GAA	Goals against average

Skater statistical abbreviations
Abbreviation	Definition
G	Goals
A	Assists
P	Points
PIM	Penalty minutes

== Goaltenders ==
Goaltenders
Player	Olympics	Tournament(s)	GP	W	L	T	Min	SO	GA	GAA	Notes	Ref(s)
Claus Dalpiaz	2	1994, 1998	5	0	3	2	–	0	20	–		
Reinhard Divis	2	1998, 2002	6	1	4	1	–	0	18	–		
Daniel Gritsch	1	1976	4	2	0	0	–	0	12	–		
Fredl Huber	1	1948	7	1	6	0	–	–	–	–		
Mathias Lange	1	2014	3	1	1	0	–	0	4	–		
Robert Mack	1	1988	1	0	1	0	–	0	5	–		
Robert Nusser	1	1956	5	0	4	1	–	0	–	–		
Karl Pregl	1	1968	5	1	4	0	–	0	23	–		
Alfred Püls	2	1956, 1964	13	3	8	2	–	1	43	–		
Michael Puschacher	1	1994	3	1	2	0	–	0	14	–		
Hansjörg Reichel	1	1948	6	1	5	0	–	–	–	–		
Michael Rudman	1	1984	5	1	4	0	–	0	37	–		
Andreas Salat	1	1988	1	0	1	0	–	0	3	–		
Franz Schilcher	2	1968, 1976	6	3	3	0	–	0	18	–		
Brian Stankiewicz	2	1988, 1994	8	1	5	2	–	0	34	–		
Bernhard Starkbaum	1	2014	2	0	2	0	–	0	14	–		
Friedrich Turek	1	1964	3	0	3	0	–	0	–	–		
Hermann Weiss	2	1928, 1936	8	2	4	2	–	–	–	–		

== Skaters ==
Skaters
Player	Olympics	Tournaments	GP	G	A	P	PIM	Notes	Ref(s)
Mario Altmann	1	2014	4	0	0	0	6		
Adolf Bachura	1	1964	8	3	1	4	2		
Christoph Brandner	2	1998, 2002	8	0	1	1	4		
Herbert Brück	1	1928	2	0	0	0	0		
Walter Brück	1	1928	2	0	0	0	0		
Gunter Burghard	1	1968	5	0	1	1	14		
Jim Burton	1	1994	7	2	2	4	6		
Thomas Cijan	2	1984, 1988	11	2	6	8	14		
Franz Csongei	2	1936, 1948	13	6	0	6	0		
Rick Cunningham	1	1984	5	1	1	2	8		
Marty Dallman	1	1994	7	4	4	8	8		
Fritz Demmer	2	1936, 1948	12	6	1	7	0		
Jacques Dietrichstein	1	1928	1	0	0	0	0		
Konrad Dorn	2	1984, 1988	11	0	2	2	4		
Rob Doyle	1	1994	7	1	1	2	14		
Egon Engel	1	1948	8	1	0	1	2		
Hermann Erhart	1	1968	5	0	0	0	2		
Hans Ertl	1	1928	1	0	0	0	0		
Walter Feistritzer	1	1948	8	4	0	4	0		
Gerhard Felfernig	1	1968	5	0	1	1	2		
Sepp Göbl	2	1928, 1936	5	2	0	2	0		
Michael Grabner	1	2014	4	5	1	6	0		
Kelly Greenbank	2	1984, 1988	11	0	3	3	12		
Gustav Gross	1	1948	6	7	0	0	0		
Michael Guntner	1	1994	5	0	0	0	4		
Adolf Hafner	1	1956	6	0	1	1	2		
Kurt Harand	2	1984, 1988	11	3	0	3	4		
Gerhard Hausner	2	1968, 1976	9	0	0	0	0		
Karl Heinzle	1	1994	7	0	0	0	4		
Raphael Herburger	1	2014	2	0	0	0	2		
Michael Herzog	1	1976	5	0	3	3	0		
Herbert Hohenberger	2	1994, 1998	11	0	0	0	20		
Martin Hohenberger	1	1998, 2002	8	0	0	0	2		
Thomas Hundertpfund	1	2014	4	1	0	1	2		
Bernie Hutz	2	1984, 1988	11	0	2	2	2		
Florian Iberer	1	2014	4	0	0	0	0		
Matthias Iberer	1	2014	2	0	0	0	0		
Wolfgang Jochl	1	1956	6	0	1	1	0		
Julius Juhn	1	1948	5	1	0	1	0		
Horst Kakl	1	1964	6	1	0	1	4		
Dieter Kalt, Sr.	2	1964, 1968	13	3	2	5	20		
Peter Kasper	1	2002	4	0	0	0	0		
Werner Kerth	2	1988, 1994	13	6	5	11	4		
Klaus Kirchbaumer	1	1968	5	1	0	1	4		
Christian Kirchberger	1	1964	7	3	1	4	0		
Herbert Klang	1	1928	1	0	0	0	0		
Heinz Knoflach	1	1968	3	0	0	0	2		
Hermann Knoll	2	1956, 1964	13	0	2	2	6		
Thomas Koch	1	2014	4	0	0	0	0		
Gert Kompajn	1	1988	6	0	0	0	4		
Rudolf Konig	3	1976, 1984, 1988	14	4	3	7	10		
Walter König	1	1968	5	0	0	0	6		
Gunter Koren	1	1988	6	2	1	3	0		
Martin Krainz	1	1994	3	0	0	0	2		
Sepp Kriechbaum	1	1976	3	0	0	0	0		
Wolfgang Kromp	3	1994, 1998, 2002	15	1	2	3	10		
Norm Krumpschmid	1	1998	4	0	0	0	2		
Kurt Kurz	1	1956	3	1	0	1	0		
Andre Lakos	2	2002, 2014	8	0	0	0	10		
Michael Lampert	1	1998	4	0	0	0	8		
Gunther Lanzinger	2	1994, 2002	11	0	1	1	14		
Manuel Latusa	1	2014	4	0	0	0	2		
Dominic Lavoie	2	1998, 2002	8	5	2	7	10		
Brian Lebler	1	2014	4	0	2	2	2		
Ed Lebler	2	1984, 1988	11	4	4	8	12		
Ulrich Lederer	1	1928	2	2	0	2	2		
Engelbert Linder	2	1994, 1998	11	0	0	0	12		
Robert Lukas	2	2002, 2014	8	0	1	1	0		
Herbert Mortl	1	1976	5	3	1	4	0		
Max Moser	1	1976	6	2	3	5	8		
Eduard Mossmer	1	1964	4	0	1	1	0		
Hans Mossmer	1	1956	6	0	0	0	2		
Josef Mossmer	1	1968	5	0	0	0	6		
Manfred Muhr	2	1988, 1994	13	0	0	0	12		
Rick Nasheim	2	1994, 1998	9	1	1	2	4		
Lambert Neumaier	1	1936	2	0	0	0	0		
Tassilo Neuwirth	1	1964	8	0	0	0	2		
Andreas Nodl	1	2014	4	0	0	0	0		
Oskar Nowak	2	1936, 1948	13	6	0	6	0		
Gunter Oberhuber	1	1976	6	0	1	1	6		
Daniel Oberkofler	1	2014	3	0	0	0	0		
Christian Perthaler	2	1998, 2002	7	1	3	4	2		
Patrik Pilloni	1	1998	4	0	0	0	2		
Martin Platzer	2	1984, 1988	11	0	1	1	2		
Herbert Pöck	3	1976, 1984, 1988	16	6	2	8	4		
Thomas Pöck	1	2002, 2014	8	0	1	1	2		
Franz Potucek	1	1956	6	1	0	1	4		
Sepp Puschnig	3	1964, 1968, 1976	19	9	5	14	37	IIHFHOF (1999)	
Andreas Pusnik	2	1994, 1998	11	4	2	6	8		
Gerhard Pusnik	3	1988, 1994, 1998	17	4	4	8	22		
Michael Raffl	1	2014	4	1	2	3	4		
Peter Raffl	2	1988, 1988	11	1	2	3	6		
Thomas Raffl	1	2014	4	0	0	0	2		
Gerald Ressmann	3	1994, 1998, 2002	15	3	0	3	10		
Erich Romauch	1	1964	8	1	2	3	0		
Othmar Russ	1	1976	6	1	1	2	10		
Alexander Sadjina	1	1976	5	2	0	2	0		
Robin Sadler	1	1988	6	2	1	3	4		
Kent Salfi	1	2002	4	0	1	1	2		
Paul Samonig	1	1968	5	1	1	2	0		
Hans Scarsini	1	1956	2	0	0	0	4		
Mario Schaden	2	1998, 2002	8	0	1	1	2		
Gerd Schager	1	1968	5	0	2	2	8		
Wilhelm Schmid	1	1956	5	1	0	1	6		
Hans Schneider	1	1948	1	0	0	0	0		
Walter Schneider	1	1976	4	0	0	0	0		
Hans Schuller	1	1976	3	0	0	0	0		
Heinz Schupp	1	1968	5	4	0	4	8		
Franz Schussler	1	1936	1	0	0	0	0		
Josef Schwitzer	2	1968, 1976	11	1	2	3	14		
Tom Searle	2	1998, 2002	8	1	2	3	6		
Emil Seidler	1	1936	2	2	0	2	0		
Walter Sell	1	1928	2	0	0	0	0		
Oliver Setzinger	2	2002, 2014	6	1	1	2	2		
Mike Shea	2	1988, 1994	13	0	1	1	8		
Max Singewald	1	1956	2	0	0	0	0		
Reginald Spevak	1	1928	2	0	0	0	4		
Fritz Spielmann	2	1956, 1964	12	6	1	7	14		
Gerdi Springer	1	1956	3	0	0	0	0		
Willibald Stanek	2	1936, 1948	14	0	0	0	0		
Konrad Staudinger	1	1956	4	1	0	1	2		
Ken Strong	1	1994	7	3	1	4	12		
Del St. John	2	1964, 1968	13	9	7	16	10		
Hans Sulzer	1	1988	6	0	3	3	8		
Silvio Szybisti	1	1988	6	1	0	0	4		
Hans Tatzer	1	1936	6	2	0	2	0		
Gustav Tischer	1	1964	8	1	2	3	0		
Matthias Trattnig	2	2002, 2014	8	1	2	3	4		
Hans Trauttenberg	1	1936	6	0	0	0	0		
Stefan Ulmer	1	2014	4	0	0	0	0		
Herbert Ulrich	1	1948	7	5	0	5	0		
Martin Ulrich	3	1994, 1998, 2002	15	1	4	5	4		
Gerhard Unterluggauer	3	1998, 2002, 2014	12	2	0	2	8		
Thomas Vanek	1	2014	4	0	1	1	4		
Rudolf Vojta	1	1936	5	0	0	0	2		
Franz Voves	1	1976	5	3	2	5	0		
Hans Wagner	1	1956	6	1	0	0	0		
Fritz Walter	1	1948	8	2	0	2	2		
Fritz Wechselberger	1	1964	8	1	0	0	0		
Klaus Weingartner	1	1968	5	1	0	1	4		
Daniel Welser	1	2014	3	0	1	1	2		
Simon Wheeldon	2	1998, 2002	8	1	2	3	12		
Helfried Winger	1	1948	3	0	0	0	0		
Erich Winkler	1	1964	8	0	2	2	4		
Rudolf Wurmbrandt	1	1948	6	3	0	3	0		
Peter Zini	1	1976	4	1	1	2	4		
Peter Znenahlik	1	1988	6	0	3	3	0		
Walter Znenahlik	2	1956, 1964	10	3	0	3	2		
Hans Zollner	1	1956	4	0	0	0	4		
