= List of Olympic men's ice hockey players for France =

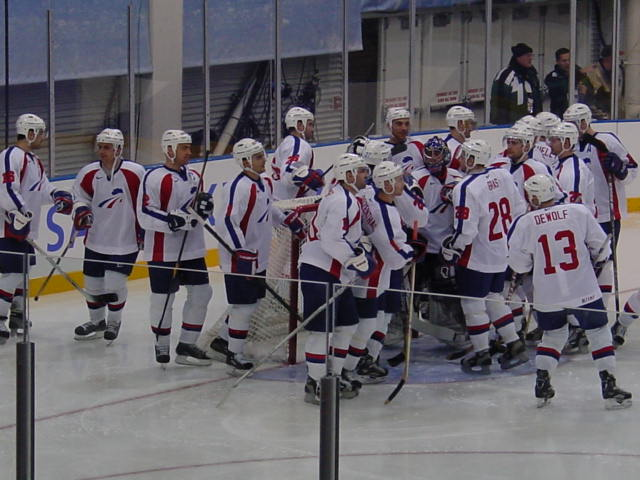
The French national team prior to a game at the 2002 Winter Olympics

The list of Olympic men's ice hockey players for France consisted of 96 skaters and 17 goaltenders. Men's ice hockey tournaments have been staged at the Olympic Games since 1920 (it was introduced at the 1920 Summer Olympics, and was permanently added to the Winter Olympic Games in 1924). France has participated in ten tournaments, the first in 1920 and the most recent in 2002. France hosted the 1924, 1968, and 1992 Winter Olympics. France's best finish is fifth overall, which they achieved at both the 1924 and 1928 Winter Olympics, while their lowest finish was fourteenth, in 1968 and 2002.

Philippe Bozon has scored the most goals, with 14, assists, 9, and has the most points, 23. Denis Perez has competed in the most Olympics, appearing in five tournaments, and has played the most games of any skater, with 29.

Three players, Philippe Bozon, Jacques Lacarrière, and Philippe Lacarrière have been inducted into the International Ice Hockey Federation Hall of Fame, though Philippe Lacarrière was inducted as a builder.

== Key ==
General terms
Term	Definition
GP	Games played
IIHFHOF	International Ice Hockey Federation Hall of Fame
Olympics	Number of Olympic Games tournaments
Ref(s)	Reference(s)

Goaltender statistical abbreviations
Abbreviation	Definition
W	Wins
L	Losses
T	Ties
Min	Minutes played
SO	Shutouts
GA	Goals against
GAA	Goals against average

Skater statistical abbreviations
Abbreviation	Definition
G	Goals
A	Assists
P	Points
PIM	Penalty minutes

== Goaltenders ==
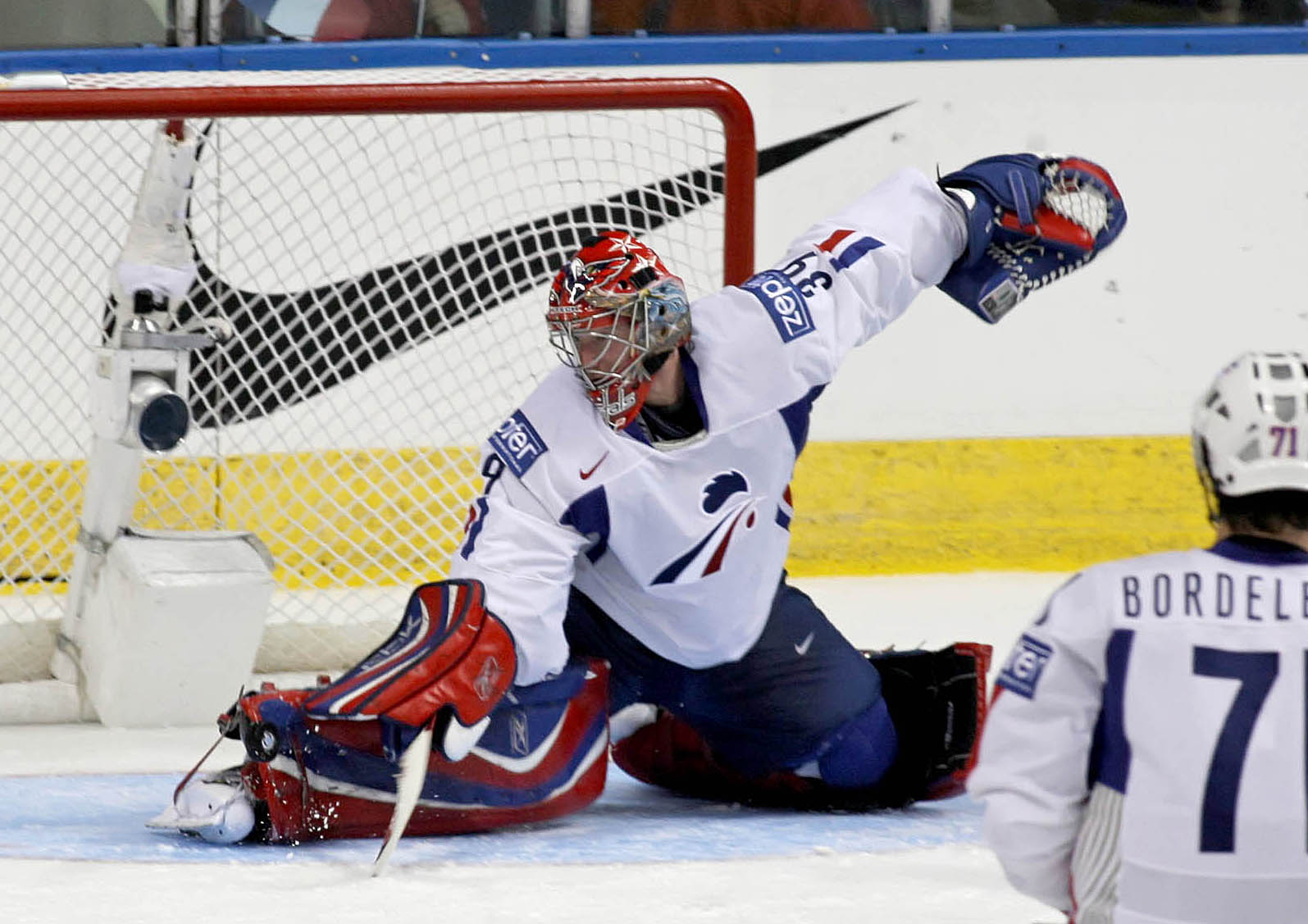
Cristobal Huet played in both the 1998 and 2002 Winter Olympics

Goaltenders
Player	Olympics	Tournament(s)	GP	W	L	T	Min	SO	GA	GAA	Notes	Ref(s)
Maurice del Valle	1	1924	1	0	1	0	–	0	–	–		
Bernard Deschamps	1	1968	3	0	3	0	–	0	15	–		
Jean-Marc Djian	2	1988, 1992	2	0	2	0	–	0	–	–		
Patrick Foliot	1	1988	5	0	4	1	–	0	33	–		
Jacques Gaittet	1	1920	1	0	1	0	–	0	–	–		
Robert George	1	1928	3	–	–	–	–	–	–	–		
François Gravel	1	1998	2	1	1	0	–	0	4	–		
Cristobal Huet	2	1998, 2002	5	1	3	1	–	0	15	–		
Charles Lavaivre	1	1924	1	1	0	0	–	–	–	–		
Philippe Lefebure	1	1928	3	2	1	0	–	–	–	–		
Daniel Maric	1	1988	2	0	2	0	–	0	15	–		
Jacques Morisson	1	1936	1	1	0	0	–	–	–	–		
Michel Paccard	1	1936	2	0	2	0	–	0	–	–		
Patrick Rolland	1	2002	1	0	1	0	–	0	7	–		
Jean-Claude Sozzi	1	1968	2	0	2	0	–	0	17	–		
Michel Vallière	1	1994	2	0	2	0	–	0	13	–		
Petri Ylönen	2	1992, 1994	12	2	8	2	–	0	48	–		

== Skaters ==
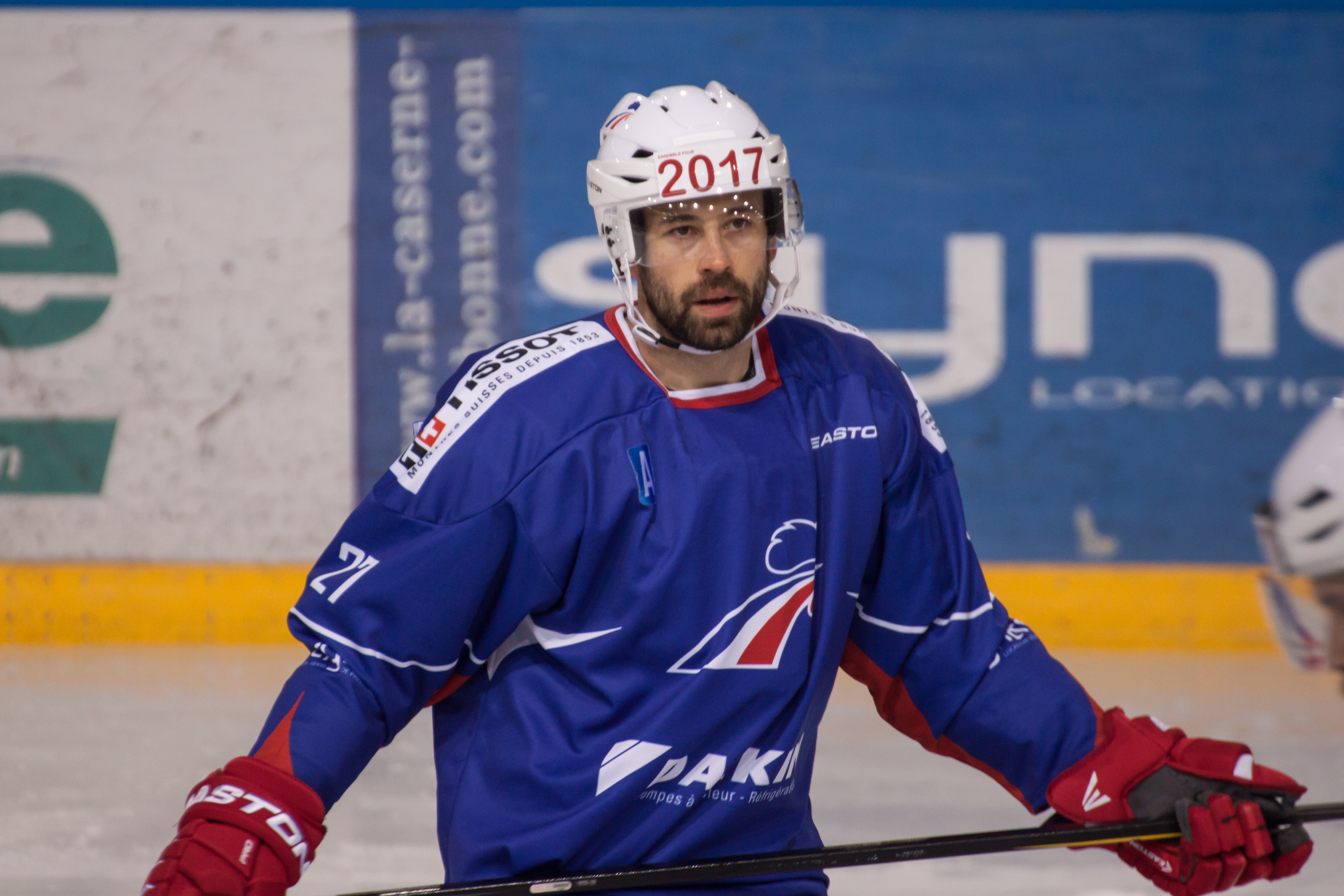
Baptiste Amar played in the 2002 Winter Olympics

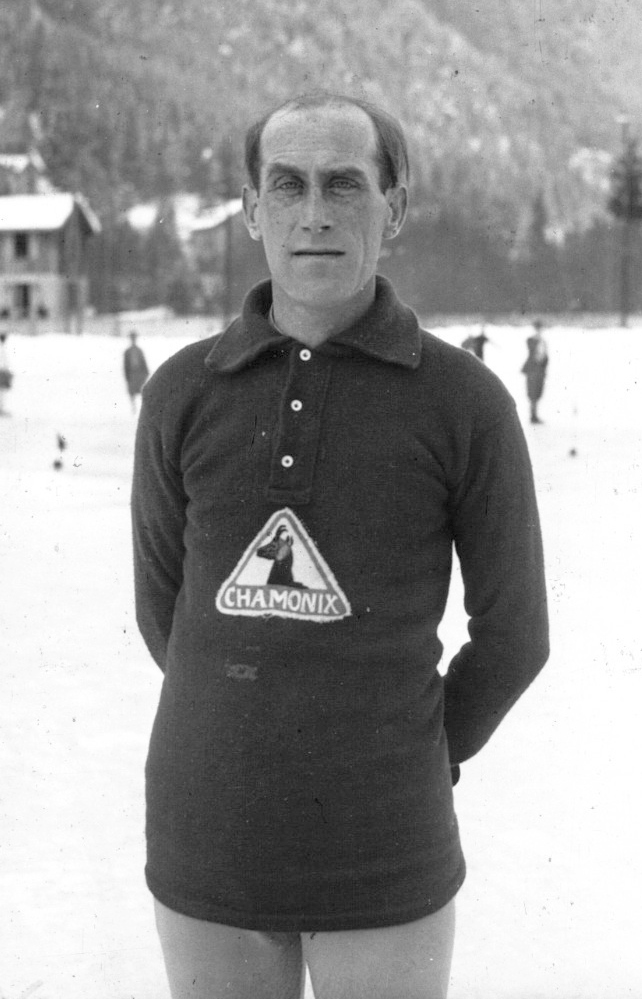
Léonhard Quaglia played in the 1920 Summer Olympics, and the 1924 and 1928 Winter Olympics, the first three tournaments for France

Skaters
Player	Olympics	Tournament(s)	GP	G	A	P	PIM	Notes	Ref(s)
Benjamin Agnel	1	1994	6	1	0	1	2		
Richard Aimonetto	2	1998, 2002	8	0	0	0	0		
Pierre Allard	1	1998	4	0	0	0	6		
Peter Almásy	2	1988, 1992	14	6	4	10	8		
Baptiste Amar	1	2002	4	0	0	0	0		
Stéphane Arcangeloni	1	1994	7	1	0	1	2		
Michaël Babin	1	1992	8	0	0	0	4		
Benoît Bachelet	1	2002	4	0	0	0	4		
Vincent Bachet	1	2002	4	0	1	1	4		
Stéphane Barin	4	1992, 1994, 1998, 2002	23	6	2	8	12		
Guillaume Besse	1	2002	4	0	0	0	0		
Claude Blanchard	1	1968	5	0	0	0	0		
René Blanchard	1	1968	5	0	0	0	2		
Jean-François Bonnard	1	2002	4	0	0	0	2		
Paulin Bordeleau	1	1988	6	1	2	3	24		
Stéphane Botteri	3	1988, 1992, 1994	21	0	2	2	20		
Philippe Boyard	1	1936	3	0	0	0	0		
Philippe Bozon	4	1988, 1992, 1998, 2002	21	14	9	23	10		
Arnaud Briand	4	1992, 1994, 1998, 2002	22	3	3	6	14		
Bernard Cabanis	1	1968	5	0	0	0	0		
Allan Carriou	1	2002	4	0	0	0	6		
Michel Caux	1	1968	5	1	0	1	22		
Jean Chaland	1	1920	1	0	0	0	0		
André Charlet	1	1924	1	0	0	0	0		
Pierre Charpentier	2	1920, 1924	3	0	0	0	0		
Jacques Chaudron	1	1924	1	0	0	0	0		
Pierre Claret	1	1936	3	0	0	0	0		
Henri Couttet	1	1920	1	0	0	0	0		
Marcel Couttet	1	1936	3	1	0	1	0		
Raoul Couvert	2	1924, 1928	2	0	0	0	0		
Yves Crettenand	1	1992	8	0	0	0	2		
Georges Dary	1	1920	1	0	0	0	0		
Alfred de Rauch	3	1920, 1924, 1928	6	5	0	5	0		
Michel Delesalle	1	1936	3	1	0	1	0		
Karl DeWolf	2	1998, 2002	7	0	0	0	8		
Serge Djelloul	1	1998	4	0	0	0	2		
Roger Dubé	1	1998	4	0	0	0	29		
Grégory Dubois	1	1998	4	0	1	1	2		
Patrick Dunn	1	1992	8	3	2	5	8		
Guy Dupuis	1	1988	6	0	5	5	0		
Gérard Faucomprez	1	1968	5	2	3	5	2		
Jean-Christophe Filippin	1	1998	4	0	0	0	4		
Patrick Francheterre	1	1968	5	0	0	0	0		
Joël Gauvin	1	1968	5	0	0	0	8		
Sylvain Girard	1	1994	6	0	1	1	0		
Joël Godeau	1	1968	4	0	0	0	0		
Daniel Grando	1	1968	4	0	0	0	0		
Laurent Gras	2	1998, 2002	8	0	0	0	2		
Gérald Guennelon	2	1992, 1994	14	0	1	1	6		
Derek Haas	1	1988	6	1	0	1	2 q		
Jean-Pierre Hagnauer	1	1936	3	1	0	1	0		
Albert Hassler	3	1924, 1928, 1936	8	3	0	3	0		
Gilbert Itzicsohn	1	1968	5	2	2	4	6		
Jacques Lacarrière	1	1936	3	0	0	0	0		
Philippe Lacarrière	1	1968	5	1	1	2	2		
Benoit Laporte	2	1992, 1994	15	3	6	9	8		
Michel Leblanc	2	1988, 1992	12	0	2	2	4		
Eric LeMarque	1	1994	5	1	0	1	6		
Jean-Philippe Lemoine	3	1988, 1992, 1998	18	0	2	2	30		
Gilbert Lèpre	1	1968	4	0	1	1	2		
Jean-Christophe Lerondeau	1	1988	6	0	0	0	2		
Stéphane Lessard	1	1988	6	0	1	1	2		
Charles Liberman	1	1968	5	1	1	2	0		
Pierre Lorin	1	1936	2	0	0	0	0		
Pierrick Maïa	1	1994	7	3	0	3	10		
Pascal Margerit	1	1992	8	0	0	0	0		
Alain Mazza	1	1968	5	2	1	3	16		
Laurent Meunier	1	2002	4	0	1	1	6		
Jean-Joseph Monnard	1	1924	1	0	0	0	0		
Anthony Mortas	2	1998, 2002	8	0	2	2	2		
Christophe Moyon	1	1994	6	0	0	0	0		
Robert Ouellet	1	1998	4	0	1	1	2		
Franck Pajonkowski	2	1988, 1994	13	7	2	9	24		
Charles Payot	1	1924	1	0	0	0	0		
Philippe Payot	2	1924, 1928	3	0	0	0	0		
André Peloffy	1	1988	6	0	2	2	0		
Denis Perez	5	1988, 1992, 1994, 1998, 2002	29	0	4	4	18		
Serge Poudrier	3	1992, 1994, 1998	19	3	7	10	12		
Christian Pouget	3	1988, 1992, 1998	18	1	2	3	18		
Benoît Pourtanel	1	2002	4	0	0	0	0		
Patrick Pourtanel	1	1968	5	0	0	0	0		
Pierre Pousse	2	1992, 1994	15	1	1	2	4		
Olivier Prechac	1	1968	5	0	0	0	0		
Léonhard Quaglia	3	1920, 1924, 1928	6	6	0	6	0		
Antoine Richer	3	1988, 1992, 1994	20	2	2	4	18		
François Rozenthal	2	1998, 2002	6	0	0	0	0		
Maurice Rozenthal	2	1998, 2002	8	4	1	5	8		
Bruno Saunier	2	1992, 1994	14	0	1	1	2		
Franck Saunier	1	1994	6	2	0	2	4		
Pierre Schmitt	1	1988	6	0	0	0	2		
Gérard Simond	1	1928	3	2	0	2	0		
Yorick Treille	1	2002	4	0	0	0	4		
Christophe Ville	3	1988, 1992, 1994	21	5	6	11	28		
Guy-Pierre Volpert	1	1936	1	0	0	0	0		
Steven Woodburn	2	1988, 1994	3	0	0	0	0		
Jonathan Zwikel	2	1998, 2002	8	0	0	0	4		
