= Daniel Grando =

Daniel Grando can refer to:

- Daniel Grando (footballer) (born 1985), Brazilian footballer
- Daniel Grando (ice hockey) (born 1948), French ice hockey player
