= Gmeiner =

Gmeiner is a surname. Notable people with the surname include:

- Fabian Gmeiner (born 1997), Austrian footballer
- Hermann Gmeiner (1919–1986), Austrian founder of SOS Children's Villages
- Josef Anton Gmeiner (1862–1926), Austrian mathematician
- Manfred Gmeiner (born 1941), German ice hockey player
- William Gmeiner, researcher
