= Hejma =

Hejma is a surname. Notable people with the surname include:

- Ondřej Hejma (born 1951), Czech singer and composer
- Petr Hejma (born 1944), Czechoslovak ice hockey player
