= Schilcher =

Schilcher may refer to:

- Schilcher (wine), an Austrian rosé-style wine
- Heinz Schilcher (1947–2018), retired Austrian football player and manager
- Franz Schilcher (born 1943), Austrian ice hockey player
