= Leimu =

Leimu is a Finnish surname. Notable people with the surname include:

- Juha Leimu (born 1983), Finnish ice hockey player
- Pekka Leimu (born 1947), Finnish ice hockey player
