= Dumitraș =

Dumitraș is a Romanian surname. Notable people with the surname include:

- Anatol Dumitraș (1955–2016), Moldovan singer
- Andrei Dumitraș (born 1988), Romanian football player and coach
- Constantin Dumitraș (born 1946), Romanian ice hockey player
- Haralambie Dumitraș (born 1960), Romanian rugby player and coach
- Iulian Dumitraș (born 1982), Romanian rugby player
