= Lepre =

Lepre is a surname. Notable people with the surname include:

- Carolyn Ringer Lepre (fl. 1991–), American academic administrator
- Francesco Lepre (born 1975), Italian judoka
- Gilbert Lèpre (1945–1974), French ice hockey player
