= Michihiro =

- Gender: Male

Origin
- Origin: Japanese
- Meaning: Different meanings depending on the kanji used

Michihiro (written: 道弘, 道大, 道博, 通弘, 通洋, 通宏, 理大, 倫弘 or 導大) is a masculine Japanese given name. Notable people with the name include:

- Michihiro Ikemizu (池水 通洋) (born 1943), Japanese voice actor
- Michihiro Kuroda (黒田 倫弘) (born 1972), Japanese singer and musician
- Michihiro Morita (森田 道博) (born 1970), Japanese Go player
- Michihiro Ogasawara (小笠原 道大) (born 1973), Japanese baseball player
- Michihiro Omigawa (小見川 道大) (born 1975), Japanese mixed martial artist and judoka
- Michihiro Ozawa (小沢 通宏) (born 1932), Japanese footballer
- Michihiro Sato (佐藤 通弘) (born 1957), Japanese musician
- Michihiro Sato (ice hockey) (佐藤 道博; born 1943), Japanese ice hockey player
- Tochinowaka Michihiro (栃乃若 導大) (born 1988), Japanese sumo wrestler
- Michihiro Tsuruta (鶴田 道弘) (born 1968), Japanese footballer
- Michihiro Yasuda (安田 理大) (born 1987), Japanese footballer
