= Tōru Itabashi =

Japanese ice hockey player

Personal information
- Nationality: Japanese
- Born: 6 June 1946 (age 78); Hokkaido, Japan

Sport
- Sport: Ice hockey

Tōru Itabashi (板橋 亨, Itabashi Tōru, born 6 June 1946) is a Japanese ice hockey player. He competed in the men's tournament at the 1968 Winter Olympics.
