= Björn Palmqvist =

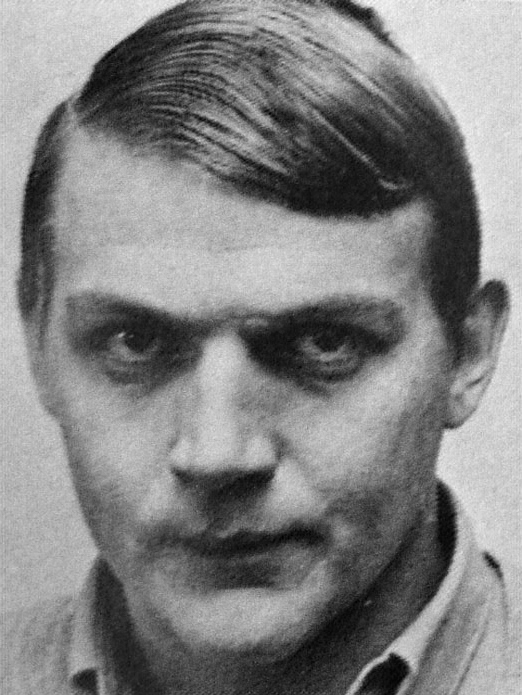
- Born: 15 March 1944 (age 81) Örnsköldsvik, Sweden
- Height: 5 ft 11 in (180 cm)
- Weight: 176 lb (80 kg; 12 st 8 lb)
- Position: Centre
- Shot: Left
- Played for: SEL; Djurgårdens IF Hockey
- National team: Sweden
- NHL draft: Undrafted
- Playing career: 1962–1981

Björn Palmqvist (also Palmquist, born 15 March 1944) is a Swedish former professional ice hockey player. He played with Djurgårdens IF Hockey from 1966 to 1978.

He finished fourth with the Sweden men's national ice hockey team at the 1968 and the 1972 Winter Olympics. He scored five goals in 1972 and none in 1968.
