= Heinz Bader =

German ice hockey player

Personal information
- Nationality: German
- Born: 10 October 1940 (age 84); Bad Tölz, Germany

Sport
- Sport: Ice hockey

Heinz Bader (born 10 October 1940) is a German former ice hockey player. He competed in the men's tournament at the 1968 Winter Olympics.
