= Johannes Schichtl =

German ice hockey player

Personal information
- Nationality: German
- Born: 8 April 1943 (age 81); Bad Tölz, Germany

Sport
- Sport: Ice hockey

Johannes Schichtl (born 8 April 1943) is a German former ice hockey player. He competed in the men's tournament at the 1968 Winter Olympics.
