= Kazuo Matsuda =

Japanese ice hockey player

Personal information
- Nationality: Japanese
- Born: 7 May 1941 (age 84) Aomori, Japan

Sport
- Sport: Ice hockey

Kazuo Matsuda (松田 一夫, Matsuda Kazuo; born 7 May 1941) is a Japanese ice hockey player. He competed in the men's tournament at the 1968 Winter Olympics.
