= Hans Dahllöf =

Swedish ice hockey player

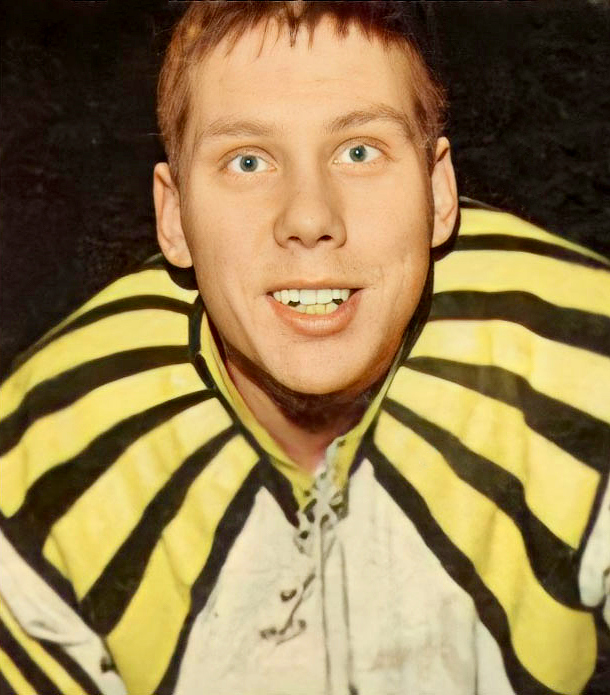
- Born: 25 January 1941 (age 85) Gävle, Sweden
- Height: 5 ft 8 in (173 cm)
- Weight: 150 lb (68 kg; 10 st 10 lb)
- Position: Goaltender
- Played for: Brynäs IF
- National team: Sweden
- Playing career: 1957–1993

Hans Tore Gunnar Dahllöf (born 25 January 1941) is a Swedish former ice hockey goaltender and Olympian.

Dahllöf played with Team Sweden at the 1968 Winter Olympics held in Grenoble, France. He previously played for the Brynäs IF in the Swedish Elite League.
