= Ciril Klinar =

Slovenian ice hockey player

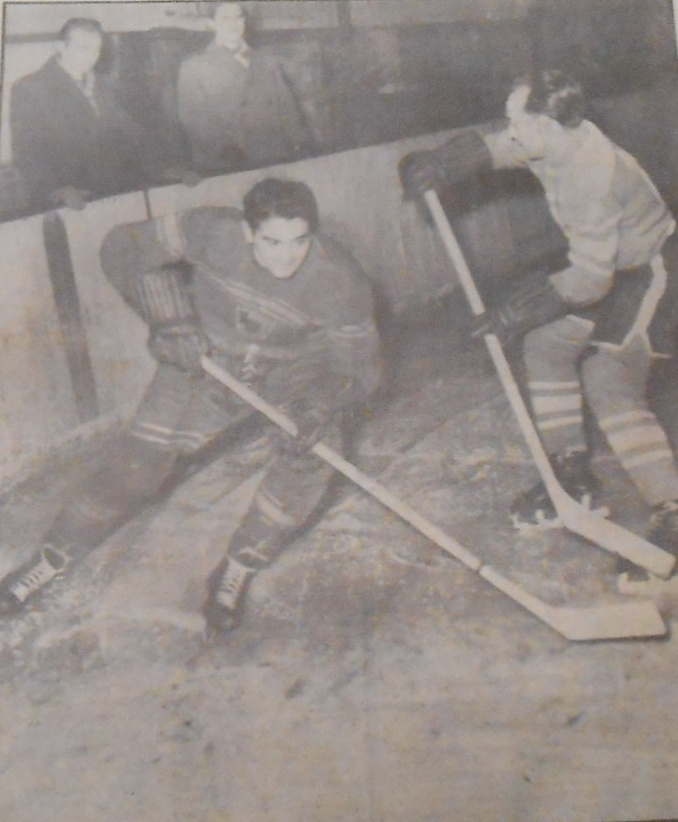
- Ciril Klinar in 1959

Personal information
- Nationality: Slovenian
- Born: 9 May 1937 (age 87); Jesenice, Yugoslavia

Sport
- Sport: Ice hockey

Ciril Klinar (born 9 May 1937) is a Slovenian ice hockey player. He competed in the men's tournament at the 1968 Winter Olympics.
