= Vasile Boldescu =

Romanian ice hockey player

Personal information
- Nationality: Romanian
- Born: 23 July 1941 (age 83); Bucharest, Romania

Sport
- Sport: Ice hockey

Vasile Boldescu (born 23 July 1941) is a Romanian ice hockey player. He competed in the men's tournament at the 1968 Winter Olympics.
