= Kari Johansson =

Finnish ice hockey player

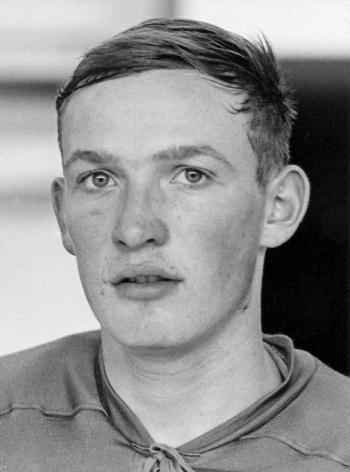

Personal information
- Nationality: Finnish
- Born: 15 February 1947 (age 78); Turku, Finland

Sport
- Sport: Ice hockey

Kari Johansson (born 15 February 1947) is a Finnish ice hockey player. He competed in the men's tournament at the 1968 Winter Olympics.
