= Takaaki Kaneiri =

Japanese ice hockey player

Personal information
- Nationality: Japanese
- Born: 2 January 1943 (age 82) Hokkaido, Japan

Sport
- Sport: Ice hockey

Takaaki Kaneiri (金入 孝明, Kaneiri Takaaki; born 2 January 1943) is a Japanese ice hockey player. He competed in the men's tournament at the 1968 Winter Olympics.
