= Klaus Weingärtner =

Austrian ice hockey player

Personal information
- Nationality: Austrian
- Born: 29 August 1944 (age 81) Vienna, Austria

Sport
- Sport: Ice hockey

Klaus Weingärtner (born 29 August 1944) is an Austrian ice hockey player. He competed in the men's tournament at the 1968 Winter Olympics.
