= Mihai Stoiculescu =

Romanian ice hockey player (born 1948)

Personal information
- Nationality: Romanian
- Born: 25 April 1948 (age 76); Bucharest, Romania

Sport
- Sport: Ice hockey

Mihai Stoiculescu (born 25 April 1948) is a Romanian ice hockey player. He competed in the men's tournament at the 1968 Winter Olympics.
