= Pekka Kuusisto (ice hockey) =

Finnish ice hockey player

- Born: 17 January 1945 (age 80); Tampere, Finland
- Height: 5 ft 6 in (168 cm)
- Weight: 170 lb (77 kg; 12 st 2 lb)
- Position: Defenceman
- Shot: Right
- Played for: Ilves Tampere; RU-38 Pori
- National team: Finland
- Playing career: 1961–1979

Pekka Juhani Kuusisto (born 17 January 1945) is a Finnish former ice hockey defenseman and Olympian.

== Career ==
Kuusisto played with Team Finland at the 1968 Winter Olympics held in Grenoble, France. He previously played for Rosenlewin Urheilijat-38 and Ilves in the Liiga league.
