= Zoltan Fagarasi =

Romanian professional ice hockey player and coach

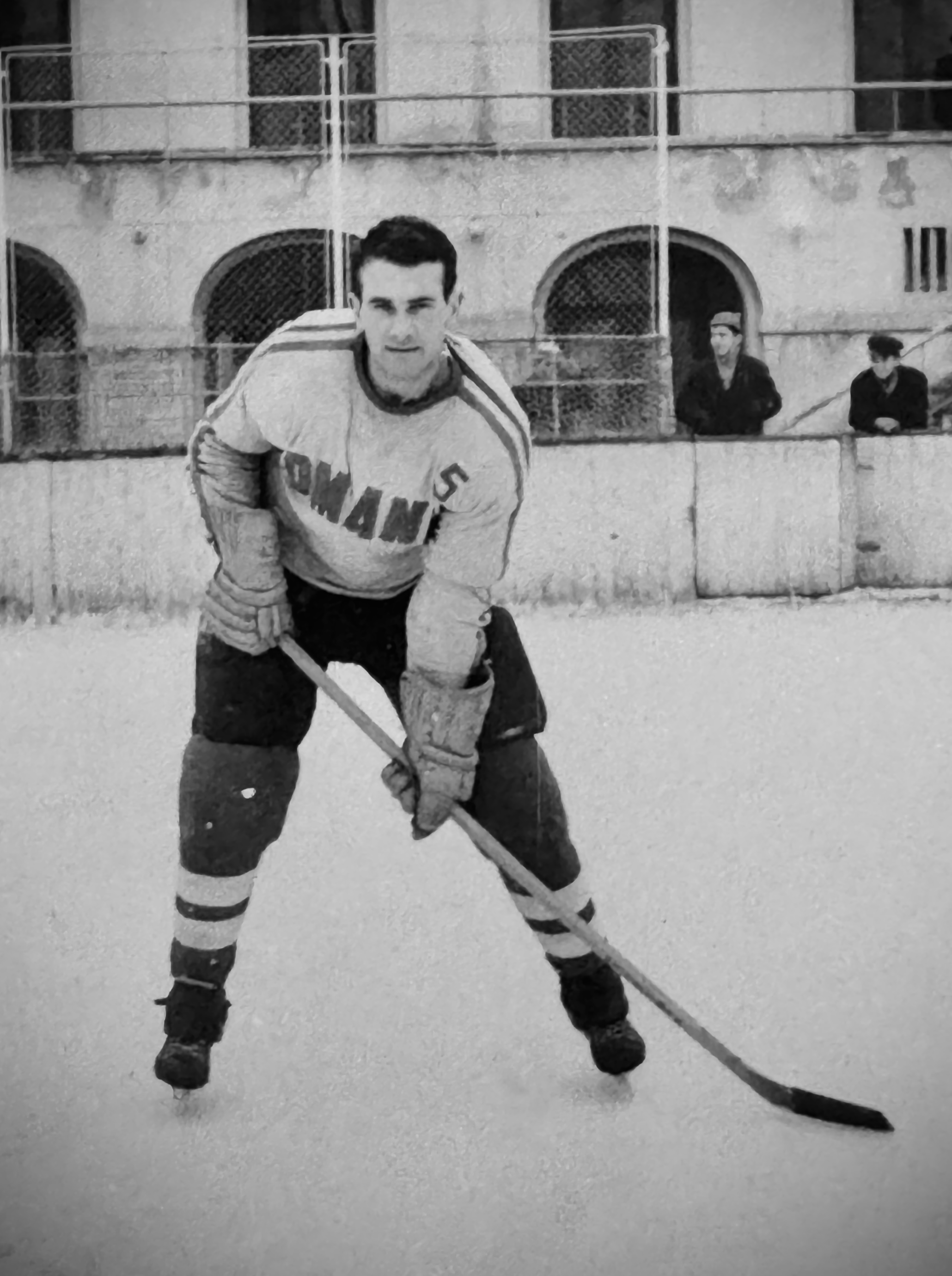

Personal information
- Nationality: Romanian
- Born: 11 January 1942 (age 83); Șumuleu Ciuc, Romania

Sport
- Sport: Ice hockey

Zoltan Fagarasi (born 11 January 1942) is a Romanian ice hockey player. He competed in the men's tournament at the 1968 Winter Olympics.
