= Franc-Rado Razinger =

Slovenian ice hockey player

Personal information
- Nationality: Slovenian
- Born: 3 December 1944 (age 80); Jesenice, Yugoslavia

Sport
- Sport: Ice hockey

Franc-Rado Razinger (born 3 December 1944) is a Slovenian ice hockey player. He competed in the men's tournament at the 1968 Winter Olympics.
