= Răzvan Schiau =

Romanian ice hockey player

Personal information
- Nationality: Romanian
- Born: 17 October 1944 (age 80); Bucharest, Romania

Sport
- Sport: Ice hockey

Răzvan Schiau (born 17 October 1944) is a Romanian ice hockey player. He competed in the men's tournament at the 1968 Winter Olympics.
