= Yutaka Ebina =

Japanese ice hockey player

Personal information
- Nationality: Japanese
- Born: 26 April 1943 (age 81); Hokkaido, Japan

Sport
- Sport: Ice hockey

Yutaka Ebina (蛯名 豊, Ebina Yutaka, born 26 April 1943) is a Japanese ice hockey player. He competed in the men's tournament at the 1968 Winter Olympics.
