= Günther Knauss =

German ice hockey player (1943–2022)

Personal information
- Nationality: German
- Born: 14 February 1943; Füssen, Bavaria, Germany
- Died: 6 February 2022 (aged 78); Füssen, Bavaria, Germany

Sport
- Sport: Ice hockey

Günther Knauss (14 February 1943 – 6 February 2022) was a German ice hockey player. He competed in the men's tournament at the 1968 Winter Olympics. Knauss died in Füssen, Bavaria on 6 February 2022, at the age of 78.
