= Horst Meindl =

German ice hockey player

Personal information
- Nationality: German
- Born: 6 February 1946 (age 79); Pfronten, Germany

Sport
- Sport: Ice hockey

Horst Meindl (born 6 February 1946) is a German former ice hockey player. He competed in the men's tournament at the 1968 Winter Olympics.
