= Peter Lax (ice hockey) =

German ice hockey player

Personal information
- Nationality: German
- Born: 7 November 1941 (age 83); Munich, Germany

Sport
- Sport: Ice hockey

Peter Lax (born 7 November 1941) is a German ice hockey player who competed in the men's tournament at the 1968 Winter Olympics.
