= Kenji Toriyabe =

Japanese ice hockey player

Personal information
- Nationality: Japanese
- Born: 16 February 1943 (age 82) Hokkaido, Japan

Sport
- Sport: Ice hockey

Kenji Toriyabe (鳥谷部 健司, Toriyabe Kenji; born 16 February 1943) is a Japanese ice hockey player. He competed in the men's tournament at the 1968 Winter Olympics.
