= Svante Granholm =

Swedish ice hockey player

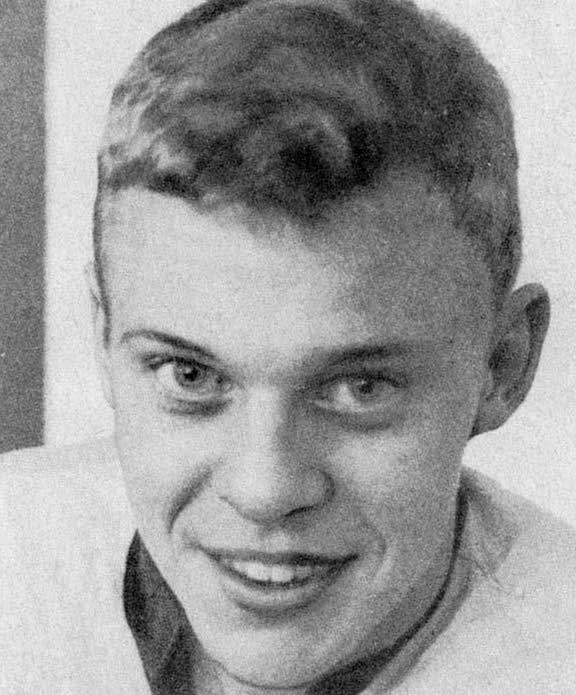
- Born: 15 March 1947 (age 79) Sundsvall, Sweden
- Height: 5 ft 11 in (180 cm)
- Weight: 165 lb (75 kg; 11 st 11 lb)
- Position: Forward
- Shot: Left
- Played for: Frölunda HC; Timrå IK
- National team: Sweden
- Playing career: 1962–1980

Nils Svante Granholm (born 15 March 1947) is a Swedish former ice hockey forward and Olympian.

Granholm played with Team Sweden at the 1968 Winter Olympics held in Grenoble, France. He previously played for Frölunda HC and Timrå IK in the Swedish Elite League.

In 1975, Svante Granholm and his teammates survived a dramatic plane crash while traveling to an away game against Brynäs. The aircraft crashed into a forest and remained undiscovered for nearly an hour. Miraculously, all passengers survived, though several players, including Granholm himself, sustained injuries requiring hospitalization.
