= Hisashi Kasai =

Japanese ice hockey player

Personal information
- Nationality: Japanese
- Born: 11 April 1943 (age 81); Tokyo, Japan

Sport
- Sport: Ice hockey

Hisashi Kasai (葛西 久, Kasai Hisashi, born 11 April 1943) is a Japanese ice hockey player. He competed in the men's tournament at the 1968 Winter Olympics.
