= Josef Schramm =

German ice hockey player (1938–2025)

Personal information
- Nationality: German
- Born: 5 June 1938 Landshut, Germany
- Died: October 2025 (aged 87)

Sport
- Sport: Ice hockey

Josef Schramm (5 June 1938 – October 2025) was a German ice hockey player. He competed in the men's tournament at the 1968 Winter Olympics.
