= Karel Masopust =

Czechoslovak ice hockey player (1942–2019)

Medal record

Men's Ice Hockey

Representing Czechoslovakia
Silver medal – second place	1968 Grenoble	Team

Karel Masopust (4 October 1942 in Prague – 25 May 2019) was an ice hockey player who played for the Czechoslovak national team. He won a silver medal at the 1968 Winter Olympics. His death was reported on 25 May 2019.
