= Isao Asai =

Japanese ice hockey player

Personal information
- Nationality: Japanese
- Born: 25 December 1942 (age 82); Hokkaido, Japan

Sport
- Sport: Ice hockey

Isao Asai (浅井 功, Asai Isao, born 25 December 1942) is a Japanese ice hockey player. He competed in the men's tournament at the 1968 Winter Olympics.
