= Aurel Moiș =

Romanian ice hockey player

Personal information
- Nationality: Romanian
- Born: 29 August 1948 (age 76)

Sport
- Sport: Ice hockey

Aurel Moiș (born 29 August 1948) is a Romanian ice hockey player. He competed in the men's tournament at the 1968 Winter Olympics.
