= Nobuhiro Araki =

Japanese ice hockey player

Personal information
- Nationality: Japanese
- Born: 10 January 1944 (age 81) Hokkaido, Japan

Sport
- Sport: Ice hockey

Nobuhiro Araki (荒城 信弘, Araki Nobuhiro; born 10 January 1944) is a Japanese ice hockey player. He competed in the men's tournament at the 1968 Winter Olympics.
