= Larry Stordahl =

American ice hockey player

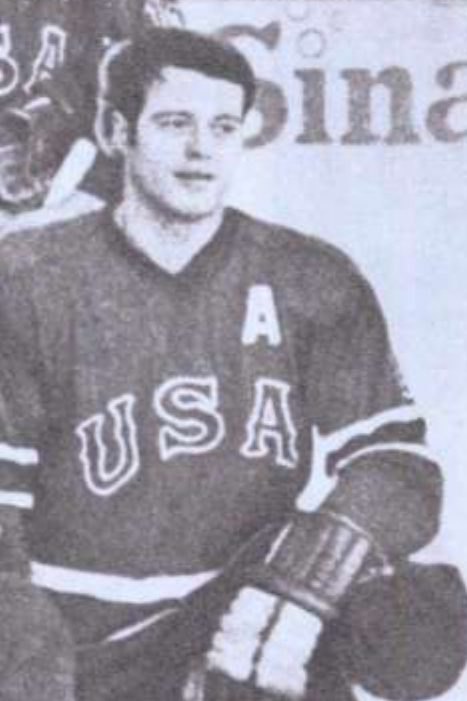
- Born: October 23, 1942 (age 83) Thief River Falls, MN, USA
- Height: 5 ft 11 in (180 cm)
- Weight: 167 lb (76 kg; 11 st 13 lb)
- Position: Left wing
- Shot: Left
- National team: United States
- Playing career: 1965–1971

Larry Delray Stordahl (born October 23, 1942) is an American former ice hockey defenseman and Olympian.

Stordahl played with Team USA at the 1968 Winter Olympics held in Grenoble, France. He previously played for the Rochester Mustangs of the United States Hockey League.
