= Pentti Koskela =

Finnish ice hockey player (1945–2024)

- Born: 27 November 1945; Tampere, Finland
- Died: 9 February 2024 (aged 78)
- Height: 5 ft 7 in (170 cm)
- Weight: 180 lb (82 kg; 12 st 12 lb)
- Position: Goaltender
- Played for: Ilves Tampere
- National team: Finland
- Playing career: 1967–1972

Pentti Koskela (27 November 1945 – 9 February 2024) was a Finnish ice hockey goaltender and Olympian.

Koskela played with Team Finland at the 1968 Winter Olympics held in Grenoble, France. He previously played for Ilves Tampere in SM-Liiga.

Koskela died on 9 February 2024, at the age of 78.
