= Ion Bașa =

Romanian ice hockey player (1944–2026)

Personal information
- Nationality: Romanian
- Born: 4 June 1944 Miercurea Ciuc, Romania
- Died: 23 October 2026 (aged 82)

Sport
- Sport: Ice hockey

Ion Bașa (Hungarian: János Basa; 4 June 1944 – 23 October 2026) was a Romanian ice hockey player, coach, and teacher. He competed in the men's tournament at the 1968 Winter Olympics.

== Early life ==
Ion Bașa was born on 4 June 1944 in Miercurea Ciuc, Romania. As a child, he used to do figure skating, however chose ice hockey.

== Personal life ==
Ion Başa died on 23 October 2026, at the age of 82.
