= Folke Bengtsson =

Swedish ice hockey player

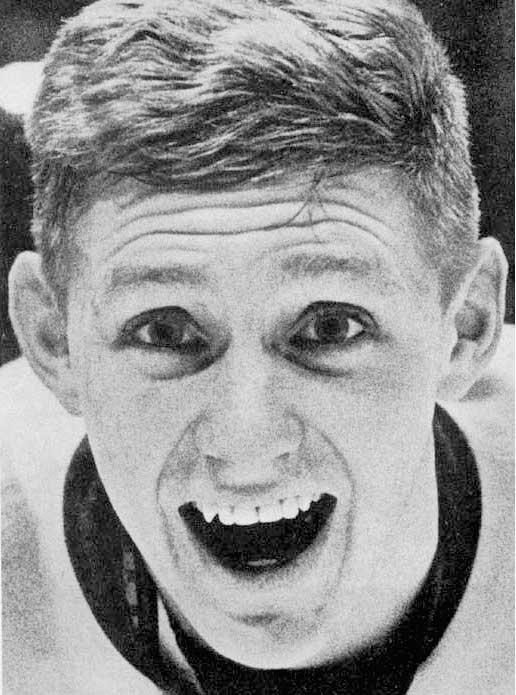
- Born: 24 April 1944 (age 81) Leksand, Sweden
- Height: 5 ft 11 in (180 cm)
- Weight: 175 lb (79 kg; 12 st 7 lb)
- Position: Center
- Shot: Left
- Played for: Djurgårdens IF Hockey; Leksands IF
- National team: Sweden
- Playing career: 1960–1981

Leif Georg Folke "Totte" Bengtsson (born 24 April 1944) is a Swedish former ice hockey center and Olympian.

Bengtsson played with Team Sweden at the 1968 Winter Olympics held in Grenoble, France. He previously played for Leksands IF and Djurgårdens IF Hockey in the Swedish Elite League.
