= Matti Harju =

Finnish ice hockey player

- Born: 14 July 1943 (age 82) Tampere, Finland
- Height: 5 ft 8 in (173 cm)
- Weight: 160 lb (73 kg; 11 st 6 lb)
- Position: Center
- Shot: Left
- Played for: Ilves Tampere; RU-38 Pori; HIFK Helsinki; Upon Pallo Lahti
- National team: Finland
- Playing career: 1961–1979

Matti Olavi Harju (born 14 July 1943) is a Finnish former ice hockey center and Olympian.

Harju played with Team Finland at the 1968 Winter Olympics held in Grenoble, France. He previously played for RU-38 Pori, HIFK Helsinki, Upon Pallo Lahti, and Ilves Tampere in SM-Liiga.
