= Jan Havel =

Czech ice hockey player

Medal record

Representing Czechoslovakia

Men's Ice Hockey
Silver medal – second place	1968 Grenoble	Team

Jan Havel (born November 10, 1942, in Kolín, Bohemia and Moravia) is an ice hockey player who played for the Czechoslovak national team. He won a silver medal at the 1968 Winter Olympics.
