= Odd Syversen =

Norwegian ice hockey player

Personal information
- Born: 5 February 1945 (age 81) Oslo, Norway

Sport
- Sport: Ice hockey

Odd Syversen (born 5 February 1945) is a Norwegian ice hockey player. He was born in Oslo, Norway and represented the club Vålerengens IF. He played for the Norwegian national ice hockey team, and participated at the Winter Olympics in Grenoble in 1968.
