= Trygve Bergeid =

Norwegian ice hockey player

Trygve Bergeid (born 30 March 1942) is a Norwegian ice hockey player. He was born in Oslo, Nazi Germany (Occupied Norway) and represented the club Isbjørnene. He played for the Norwegian national ice hockey team, and participated at the Winter Olympics in Grenoble in 1968, where the Norwegian team placed 11th.
