= Pekka Leimu =

Finnish ice hockey player

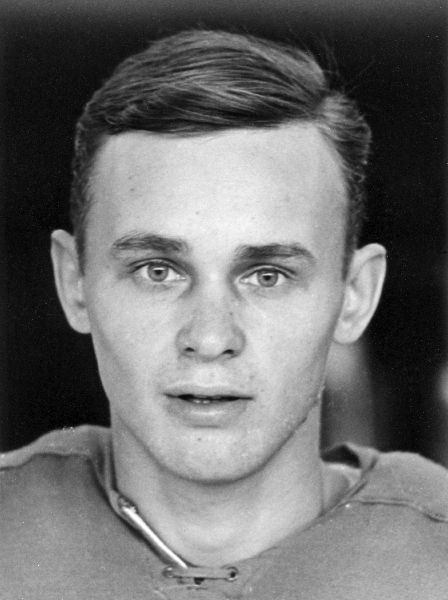
- Born: 11 April 1947 (age 78); Tampere, Finland
- Height: 5 ft 7 in (170 cm)
- Weight: 170 lb (77 kg; 12 st 2 lb)
- Position: Left wing
- Shot: Left
- Played for: Ilves Tampere
- National team: Finland
- Playing career: 1961–1979

Pekka Antero Leimu (born 11 April 1947) is a Finnish former ice hockey center and Olympian.

Leimu played with Team Finland at the 1968 Winter Olympics held in Grenoble, France. He previously played for Ilves Tampere in SM-Liiga.
