= Daniel Grando (footballer) =

Brazilian footballer (born 1985)

Personal information
- Date of birth: 28 November 1985 (age 40)
- Place of birth: Pato Branco, Brazil
- Height: 1.73 m (5 ft 8 in)
- Position: Striker

Youth career
- 2004–2005: Corinthians Paulista

Senior career*
Years	Team	Apps	(Gls)
2006–2008	Corinthians Paulista	4	(1)
- * Club domestic league appearances and goals

Daniel Grando (born 28 November 1985) is a Brazilian former professional footballer who played as a striker.
