= Constantin Dumitraș =

Romanian ice hockey player

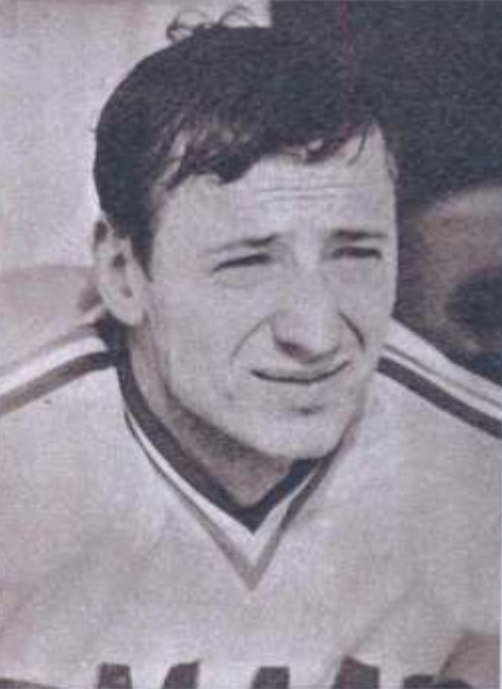
- Dumitraș in 1970

Personal information
- Nationality: Romanian
- Born: 23 January 1946 (age 80) Bucharest, Romania

Sport
- Sport: Ice hockey

Constantin Dumitraș (born 23 January 1946) is a Romanian ice hockey player. He competed in the men's tournament at the 1968 Winter Olympics.
