= Hermann Erhart =

Austrian ice hockey player

Personal information
- Nationality: Austrian
- Born: 12 July 1943 (age 81); Innsbruck, Austria

Sport
- Sport: Ice hockey

Hermann Erhart (born 12 July 1943) is an Austrian ice hockey player. He competed in the men's tournament at the 1968 Winter Olympics.
