= Gerd Schager =

Austrian ice hockey player

Personal information
- Nationality: Austrian
- Born: 18 June 1944 (age 81) Sankt Veit an der Glan, Austria

Sport
- Sport: Ice hockey

Gerd Schager (born 18 June 1944) is an Austrian former ice hockey player. He competed in the men's tournament at the 1968 Winter Olympics.
