= René Blanchard =

French ice hockey player

Personal information
- Nationality: French
- Born: 12 July 1947 (age 77); Megève, France

Sport
- Sport: Ice hockey

René Blanchard (born 12 July 1947) is a French ice hockey player. He competed in the men's tournament at the 1968 Winter Olympics.
