= Joël Godeau =

French ice hockey player

Personal information
- Nationality: French
- Born: 6 August 1945 (age 79); Saint-Gervais, France

Sport
- Sport: Ice hockey

Joël Godeau (born 6 August 1945) is a French ice hockey player. He competed in the men's tournament at the 1968 Winter Olympics.
