= Gérard Faucomprez =

French ice hockey player

Personal information
- Nationality: French
- Born: 9 October 1944; Brive-la-Gaillarde, France
- Died: 2 April 2005 (aged 60); Paris, France

Sport
- Sport: Ice hockey

Gérard Robert Daniel Faucomprez (9 October 1944 – 2 April 2005) was a French ice hockey player. He competed in the men's tournament at the 1968 Winter Olympics.
