= Jean-Claude Sozzi =

French ice hockey player

Personal information
- Nationality: French
- Born: 31 October 1943 (age 81); Boulogne-Billancourt, France

Sport
- Sport: Ice hockey

Jean-Claude Sozzi (born 31 October 1943) is a French former professional ice hockey goaltender. He competed in the men's tournament at the 1968 Winter Olympics.
