= Günter Burghard =

Austrian ice hockey player

Personal information
- Nationality: Austrian
- Born: 18 November 1942 (age 82); Innsbruck, Austria

Sport
- Sport: Ice hockey

Günter Burghard (born 18 November 1942) is an Austrian ice hockey player. He competed in the men's tournament at the 1968 Winter Olympics.
