= Alain Mazza =

French ice hockey player

Personal information
- Nationality: French
- Born: 14 October 1948 (age 76); Chamonix, France

Sport
- Sport: Ice hockey

Alain Mazza (born 14 October 1948) is a French ice hockey player. He competed in the men's tournament at the 1968 Winter Olympics.
