= Toru Okajima =

Japanese ice hockey player

Tōru Okajima
Personal information
- Nationality: Japanese
- Born: 21 January 1943 (age 82); Hokkaido, Japan

Sport
- Sport: Ice hockey

Tōru Okajima (岡島 徹, Okajima Tōru, born 21 January 1943) is a Japanese ice hockey player. He competed in the men's tournaments at the 1968 Winter Olympics and the 1972 Winter Olympics.
