= Heinz Knoflach =

Austrian ice hockey player

Personal information
- Nationality: Austrian
- Born: 30 July 1945 (age 79); Innsbruck, Austria

Sport
- Sport: Ice hockey

Heinz Knoflach (born 30 July 1945) is an Austrian ice hockey player. He competed in the men's tournament at the 1968 Winter Olympics.
