= Bernard Deschamps =

French ice hockey player

Personal information
- Nationality: French
- Born: 29 May 1944 (age 80); Lorient, France

Sport
- Sport: Ice hockey

Bernard Deschamps (born 29 May 1944) is a French ice hockey player. He competed in the men's tournament at the 1968 Winter Olympics. He played on numerous teams. Deschamps played on multiple teams including the Long Island Ducks (ice hockey) of the American Hockey League. He would additionally play for Sudbury Wolves, Indianapolis Chiefs, Baltimore Clippers, St. Paul Rangers and the Providence Reds. Deschamps was considered to be a top minor league prospect. In 1975, he was selected on waivers to earn a spot on the roster for the New York Rangers. Deschamps was influential in the career of African American Hockey player Val James. He served as the coach for St. John's University's Hockey team. In 2002, he was selected to coach the hockey team for Suny Stony Brook.

Deschamps also worked as a real estate salesman.
