= Michel Caux =

French ice hockey player

Personal information
- Nationality: French
- Born: 30 August 1946 (age 78); Chamonix, France

Sport
- Sport: Ice hockey

Michel Caux (born 30 August 1946) is a French ice hockey player. He competed in the men's tournament at the 1968 Winter Olympics.
