= Walter König (ice hockey) =

Austrian ice hockey player

Personal information
- Nationality: Austrian
- Born: 9 June 1944 (age 81) Klagenfurt, Austria

Sport
- Sport: Ice hockey

Walter König (born 9 June 1944) is an Austrian ice hockey player. He competed in the men's tournament at the 1968 Winter Olympics.
