= Josef Anton Gmeiner =

Austrian mathematician (1862–1926)

Josef Anton Gmeiner (1862-1926) was an Austrian mathematician working in number theory and mathematical analysis.

Gmeiner studied physics and mathematics at the University of Innsbruck from 1885. In 1890 he passed the examination qualifying him to teach at Gymnasien. After two years as an assistant at the University of Innsbruck's physical institute, he worked as an auxiliary teacher at secondary schools in various locations, including Graz, Fiume, Klagenfurt and Vienna. He earned his doctorate at the University of Innsbruck in 1895, under the joint supervision of Leopold Gegenbauer and Otto Stolz. He then found employment at the German-language Gymnasium in Pula. He became in 1899 a teacher at a Realschule in Vienna and in 1900 a docent in mathematics at the University of Vienna and at TH Wien. At the German University in Prague he was appointed professor extraordinarius in 1901 and promoted to professor ordinarius in 1904. In 1906 he returned to the University of Innsbruck in the professorial chair vacated by the death of Stolz in 1905.

== Selected publications ==
- Gmeiner, J. A. (1890). Die Ergänzungssätze zum bicubischen Reciprocitäts-Gesetze. SBer. Kais. Akad. Wissensch. Wien, 100, 1330-1361.
- Theoretische Arithmetik (2 volumes: vol. 1, 1900, vol. 2, 1902) by Otto Stolz & J. A. Gmeiner
