= Olivier Prechac =

French ice hockey player

Personal information
- Nationality: French
- Born: 5 January 1949 Versailles, France
- Died: 12 January 2007 (aged 58)

Sport
- Sport: Ice hockey

Olivier Prechac (5 January 1949 – 12 January 2007) was a French ice hockey player. He competed in the men's tournament at the 1968 Winter Olympics. He later played 5 games for Boston University in 1971, helping the program win its fist national championship.
