= Heinz Schupp =

Austrian ice hockey player

Personal information
- Nationality: Austrian
- Born: 26 February 1942 (age 84) Klagenfurt, Austria

Sport
- Sport: Ice hockey

Heinz Schupp (born 26 February 1942) is an Austrian ice hockey player. He competed in the men's tournament at the 1968 Winter Olympics.
