= Joël Gauvin =

French ice hockey player

Personal information
- Nationality: French
- Born: 24 July 1939 (age 85); Briançon, France

Sport
- Sport: Ice hockey

Joël Gauvin (born 24 July 1939) is a French former ice hockey defenceman. He competed in the men's tournament at the 1968 Winter Olympics.
