= Adelbert St. John =

Canadian-Austrian ice hockey player

- Born: July 10, 1931 Pincher Creek, Alberta, Canada
- Died: December 18, 2009 (aged 78) Klagenfurt, Austria
- Height: 5 ft 7 in (170 cm)
- Weight: 154 lb (70 kg; 11 st 0 lb)
- Position: Right wing
- Played for: Klagenfurter AC; HC Salzburg; Innsbrucker EV; Villacher SV
- National team: Austria
- Playing career: 1953–1979

Adelbert "Del" St. John (October 6, 1931 – December 18, 2009) was a Canadian-Austrian professional ice hockey player.

St. John, a forward, scored 17 goals and 16 assists in 31 games for the Nottingham Panthers of the British National League.

He played the 1958-9 season in Serie A in Italy with HC Bolzano, and he played the 1960-61 season in Austria for Klagenfurter AC.

== International ==
St. John competed as a member of the Austria men's national ice hockey team at the 1964 and 1968 Winter Olympic Games.

== External sources ==
- Biographical information and career statistics from Eliteprospects.com, or The Internet Hockey Database
