= Paul Samonig =

Austrian ice hockey player

Personal information
- Nationality: Austrian
- Born: 2 September 1947 (age 78) Klagenfurt, Austria

Sport
- Sport: Ice hockey

Paul Samonig (born 2 September 1947) is an Austrian ice hockey player. He competed in the men's tournament at the 1968 Winter Olympics.
