= Minoru Ito (ice hockey) =

Japanese ice hockey player

Personal information
- Nationality: Japanese
- Born: 26 March 1948 (age 77); Tochigi, Japan

Sport
- Sport: Ice hockey

Minoru Ito (伊藤 実, Itō Minoru, born 26 March 1948) is a Japanese ice hockey player. He competed in the men's tournaments at the 1968 Winter Olympics, the 1972 Winter Olympics and the 1976 Winter Olympics.
