= Manfred Gmeiner =

German ice hockey player (born 1941)

Personal information
- Nationality: German
- Born: 2 October 1941 (age 84) Füssen, Germany

Sport
- Sport: Ice hockey

Manfred Gmeiner (born 2 October 1941) is a German former ice hockey player. He competed in the men's tournament at the 1968 Winter Olympics.
