= Claude Blanchard (ice hockey) =

French ice hockey player (1945–2019)

- Born: 25 May 1945; Vichy, France
- Died: 9 July 2019 (aged 74); Chalon-sur-Saône, France
- Height: 5 ft 10 in (178 cm)
- Weight: 165 lb (75 kg; 11 st 11 lb)
- Position: Defence
- National team: France
- Playing career: 1962–1971

Claude René Georges Blanchard (25 May 1945 – 9 July 2019) was a French ice hockey player. He competed in the men's tournament at the 1968 Winter Olympics.

His death was announced on 11 July 2019.
