= Michihiro Sato (ice hockey) =

Japanese ice hockey player

Personal information
- Nationality: Japanese
- Born: 18 November 1943 (age 82) Hokkaido, Japan

Sport
- Sport: Ice hockey

Michihiro Sato (佐藤 道博, Satō Michihiro; born 18 November 1943) is a Japanese ice hockey player. He competed in the men's tournament at the 1968 Winter Olympics.
