= Gerhard Felfernig =

Austrian ice hockey player

Personal information
- Nationality: Austrian
- Born: 18 May 1944 (age 80); Villach, Austria
- Died: 08.08.1999; Vienna

Sport
- Sport: Ice hockey

Gerhard Felfernig (born 18 May 1944) is an Austrian ice hockey player. He competed in the men's tournament at the 1968 Winter Olympics.
