= Patrick Pourtanel =

French ice hockey player

Patrice Pourtanel
Personal information
- Nationality: French
- Born: 8 February 1946 (age 80) Ris-Orangis, France

Sport
- Sport: Ice hockey

Patrice (sometimes misspelled Patrick) Pourtanel (born 8 February 1946) is a French former ice hockey player. He competed in the men's tournament at the 1968 Winter Olympics.
