= Petr Hejma =

Czech ice hockey player

Medal record

Representing Czechoslovakia

Men's Ice Hockey
Silver medal – second place	1968 Grenoble	Team

Petr Hejma (born 27 June 1944 in Prague) is an ice hockey player who played for the Czechoslovak national team. He won a silver medal at the 1968 Winter Olympics.
