= Klaus Kirchbaumer =

Austrian ice hockey player

Personal information
- Nationality: Austrian
- Born: 7 October 1944 (age 80); Innsbruck, Austria

Sport
- Sport: Ice hockey

Klaus Kirchbaumer (born 7 October 1944) is an Austrian ice hockey player. He competed in the men's tournament at the 1968 Winter Olympics. He also played several years for Innsbrucker EV of the Austrian Hockey League.
