= Bernard Cabanis =

French ice hockey player

Personal information
- Nationality: French
- Born: 23 June 1950 (age 74); Saint-Germain-en-Laye, France

Sport
- Sport: Ice hockey

Bernard Cabanis (born 23 June 1950) is a French ice hockey player. He competed in the men's tournament at the 1968 Winter Olympics.
