= Gilbert Itzicsohn =

French ice hockey player

Personal information
- Nationality: French
- Born: 14 August 1944 (age 80); Paris, France

Sport
- Sport: Ice hockey

Gilbert Itzicsohn (born 17 August 1944) is a French ice hockey player. He competed in the men's tournament at the 1968 Winter Olympics.
