= Gerhard Hausner =

Austrian ice hockey player

Personal information
- Nationality: Austrian
- Born: 25 September 1947 (age 78) Vienna, Austria

Sport
- Sport: Ice hockey

Gerhard Hausner (born 25 September 1947) is an Austrian ice hockey player. He competed in the men's tournaments at the 1968 Winter Olympics and the 1976 Winter Olympics.
