= Takao Hikigi =

Japanese ice hockey player

Personal information
- Nationality: Japanese
- Born: 30 October 1944 (age 81) Hokkaido, Japan

Sport
- Sport: Ice hockey

Takao Hikigi (引木 孝夫, Hikigi Takao; born 30 October 1944) is a Japanese ice hockey player. He competed in the men's tournaments at the 1968 Winter Olympics and the 1972 Winter Olympics.
