= Sepp Puschnig =

Austrian ice hockey player (1946–2026)

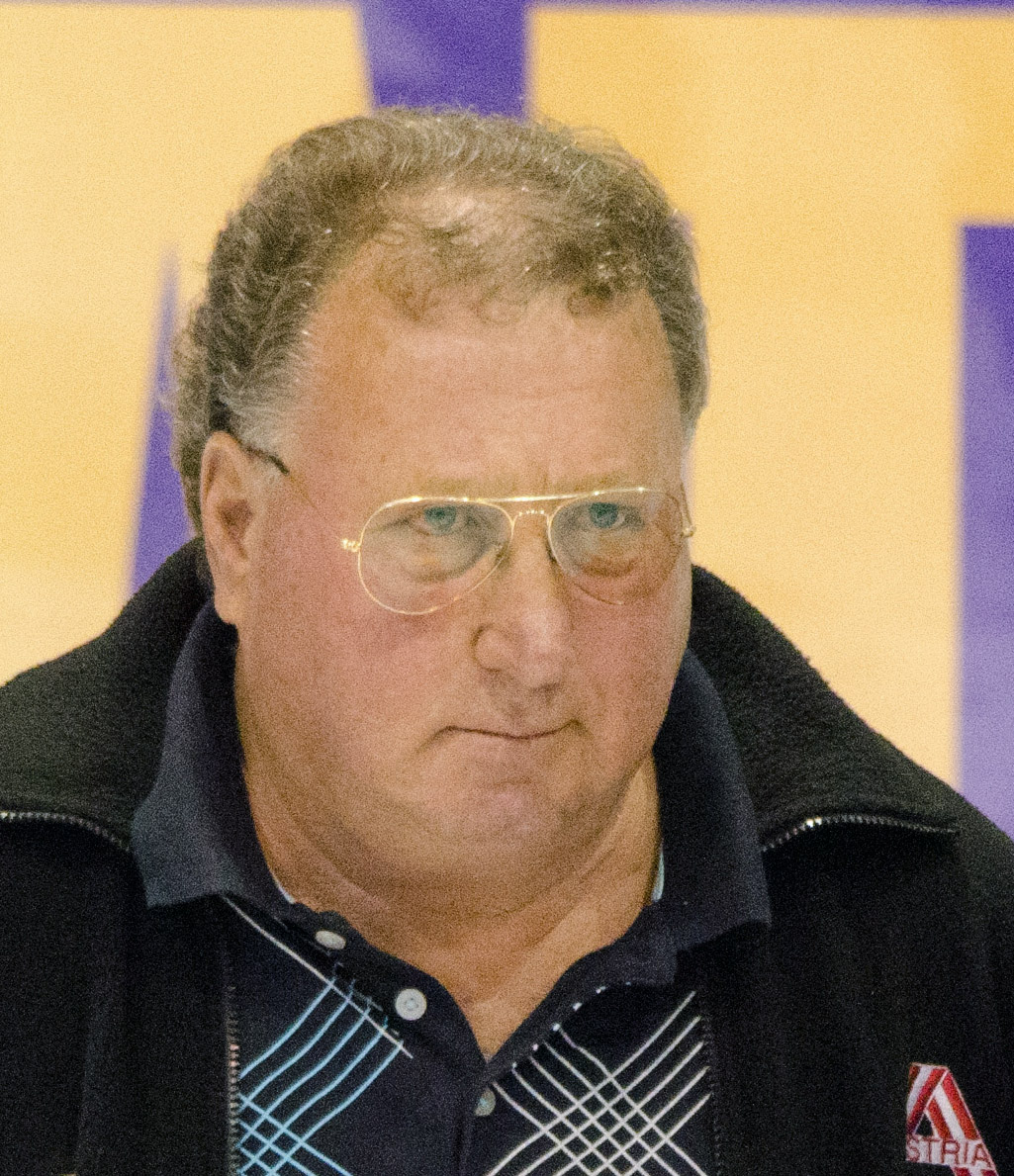
- Puschnig in 2013
- Born: 12 September 1946 Klagenfurt, Austria
- Died: 2 August 2026 (aged 79) Klagenfurt, Austria
- Height: 5 ft 10 in (178 cm)
- Weight: 190 lb (86 kg; 13 st 8 lb)
- Position: Forward
- Shot: Left
- National team: Austria
- Playing career: 1964–1977

Josef "Sepp" Puschnig (12 September 1946 – 2 August 2026) was an Austrian ice hockey player. He participated at three Winter Olympics, and was inducted into the International Ice Hockey Federation Hall of Fame in 1999.

== Career ==
Puschnig was born in Klagenfurt, Austria, on 12 September 1946.

In 1962, Puschnig made his debut with EC KAC and stayed with the team for 17 seasons. During this time, he won 13 Austrian championship titles while scoring 362 goals. His number has since been retired by the team. He also participated in three Winter Olympics and eleven Ice Hockey World Championships.

Puschnig was inducted into the player category of the IIHF Hall of Fame in 1999. In 2012, he was voted the Austrian Ice Hockey Federation as the player of the century.

In 2014, Puschnig received the Decoration of Honour for Services to the Republic of Austria. In his honor, Stadthalle, the home arena of the EC KAC, has a hall dedicated to him.

Puschnig died in Klagenfurt, Austria, on 2 August 2026 at age 79.
