= Josef Schwitzer =

Austrian ice hockey player

Personal information
- Nationality: Austrian
- Born: 31 October 1946 (age 78); Innsbruck, Austria

Sport
- Sport: Ice hockey

Josef Schwitzer (born 31 October 1946) is an Austrian ice hockey player. He competed in the men's tournaments at the 1968 Winter Olympics and the 1976 Winter Olympics.
