= Iuliu Szabo =

Romanian ice hockey player

Personal information
- Nationality: Romanian
- Born: 1 December 1940; Miercurea Ciuc, Romania
- Died: 17 March 2003 (aged 62)

Sport
- Sport: Ice hockey

Iuliu Szabo (1 December 1940 – 17 March 2003) was a Romanian ice hockey player. He competed in the men's tournaments at the 1964 Winter Olympics and the 1968 Winter Olympics.
