= Gilbert Lèpre =

French ice hockey player

Personal information
- Nationality: French
- Born: 6 February 1945; Domeyrot, France
- Died: 1 September 1974 (aged 29); Ury, France

Sport
- Sport: Ice hockey

Gilbert Charles Maurice Lèpre (6 February 1945 - 1 September 1974) is a French ice hockey player. He competed in the men's tournament at the 1968 Winter Olympics.
