= Franz Schilcher =

Austrian ice hockey player

Personal information
- Nationality: Austrian
- Born: 19 August 1943 (age 82) Graz, Nazi Germany

Sport
- Sport: Ice hockey, Tennis

Franz Schilcher (born 19 August 1943) is an Austrian ice hockey and Tennis player. He competed in the men's tournaments at the 1968 Winter Olympics and the 1976 Winter Olympics.
