= Daniel Grando (ice hockey) =

French ice hockey player

Personal information
- Nationality: French
- Born: 20 June 1948 (age 76); Sallanches, France

Sport
- Sport: Ice hockey

Daniel Grando (born 20 June 1948) is a French former ice hockey right winger.

== Career ==
Grando played for the hockey clubs Saint-Gervais, who represented France in the 1968 Winter Olympics, and CSG Grenoble. He retired from playing hockey in 1983. He became a coach for French junior teams in 1981 and coached until 1990.
