= Ice hockey at the 1968 Winter Olympics =

- Hockey pictogram

Tournament details
- Host country: France
- Dates: 6–17 February 1968
- Teams: 14

Final positions
- Champions: Soviet Union (3rd title)
- Runners-up: Czechoslovakia
- Third place: Canada
- Fourth place: Sweden

Tournament statistics
- Games played: 43
- Goals scored: 316 (7.35 per game)
- Scoring leader: (Soviet Union) Anatoli Firsov (16 points)

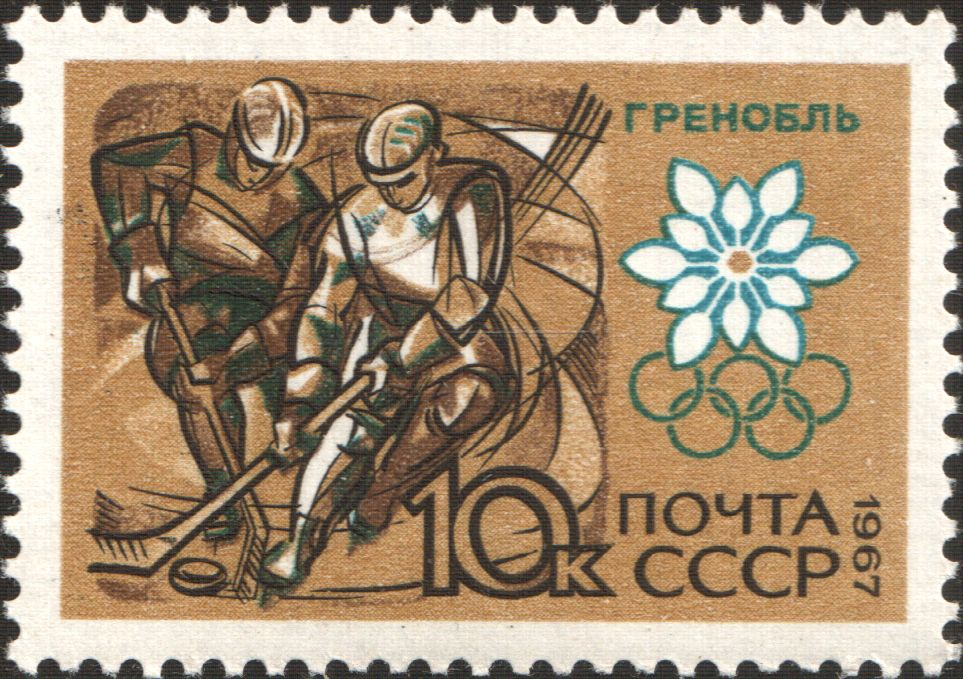
Soviet postage stamp for the 1968 Winter Olympics

The men's ice hockey tournament at the 1968 Winter Olympics held in Grenoble, France, was the 11th Olympic Championship, also serving as the 35th World Championships and the 46th European Championships. This was the last Olympic tournament to include the World and European titles. Games were held at the Palais des Sports. The Soviet Union won their third Olympic gold medal, eighth World Championship and twelfth European Championship. Czechoslovakia won the silver, followed by Canada taking the bronze.

For the first (and only) time, not all qualifiers were given the opportunity to play for medals, as the lowest two ranked qualifiers (Japan and Austria), together with host France were placed directly into the Consolation Group. Poland and Italy qualified but declined to participate.

== Teams ==
Fourteen nations participated:

- Austria
- Canada
- Czechoslovakia
- East Germany
- Finland
- France
- Japan
- Norway
- Romania
- Soviet Union
- Sweden
- United States
- West Germany
- Yugoslavia

== Highlights ==
In their penultimate match of the tournament, the USSR team lost to the Czechoslovak team, which gave a tie-breaking advantage to the latter as each team had a record of 5 wins, 1 loss (10 points) with one game remaining. Yet the USSR team was also tied with Canada and would play the Canadians in the final game of the tournament. For teams finishing with identical records, it is games between those against each other that determines the placings. To win the championship, Czechoslovakia needed to win its game against Sweden and for Canada to lose or tie its match with USSR. Had Canada won against USSR and Czechoslovakia won its game over Sweden, Canada would have tied Czechoslovakia with 12 points but prevailed in the tie breaker to win the championship. In their final matches of the tournament, Sweden tied with Czechoslovakia, while the USSR won its game against Canada, and the gold medal.

=== Firsts ===
East Germany participated for the first and only time in these games and played its final game with rival West Germany. The West prevailed, 4–2. Finland pulled off a historic first, defeating Canada in the second day of competition. For the USSR, their loss broke a record streak of 39 straight World Championship games without a loss.

== Medalists ==
Pos	Team
Gold	Soviet Union
Silver	Czechoslovakia
Bronze	Canada

== First round ==
East Germany - Norway 3:1 (2:1, 1:0, 0:0)

4. February 1968 - Grenoble
Goalscorers: Joachim Ziesche, Lothar Fuchs, Peter Prusa - Odd Syversen.

Finland - (Socialist Federal Republic of Yugoslavia) Yugoslavia 11:2 (3:0, 6:0, 2:2)

4. February 1968 - Grenoble
Goalscorers: Lasse Oksanen 2, Esa Peltonen 2, Matti Reunamaki 2, Juhani Wahlsten, Veli-Pekka Ketola, Matti Keinonen, Matti Harju, Pekka Leimu - Albin Felc, Franc Smolej.

West Germany - Romania 7:0 (1:0, 3:0, 3:0)

4. February 1968 - Grenoble
Goalscorers: Gustav Hanig 2, Alois Schloder, Ernst Kopf, Otto Schneitberger, Horst Meindl, Heinz Weisenbach.

Finland, East Germany and West Germany qualify for Group A medal round. Romania, Yugoslavia and Norway participate in Group B for 9th-14th place.

== World Championship Group A (France) ==
=== Final Round ===
First place team wins gold, second silver and third bronze.

Pos	Team	Pld	W	L	D	GF	GA	GD	Pts
1	Soviet Union	7	6	1	0	48	10	+38	12
2	Czechoslovakia	7	5	1	1	33	17	+16	11
3	Canada	7	5	2	0	28	15	+13	10
4	Sweden	7	4	2	1	23	18	+5	9
5	Finland	7	3	3	1	17	23	−6	7
6	United States	7	2	4	1	23	28	−5	5
7	West Germany	7	1	6	0	13	39	−26	2
8	East Germany	7	0	7	0	13	48	−35	0

Source: HockeyCanada.ca

Czechoslovakia – (United States) USA 5:1 (1:1, 2:0, 2:0)

6. February 1968 – Grenoble
Goal scorers: Suchý, Havel, Jiřík, Hejma, Jiří Holík – Volmar.
Referees: Dahlberg, Wiking (SWE)

(Soviet Union) USSR – Finland 8:0 (3:0, 2:0, 3:0)

6. February 1968 – Grenoble
Goal scorers: Starshinov 2, Mishakov 2, Zimin 2, Firsov, Polupanov.
Referees: Bucala, Kořínek (TCH)

Canada – West Germany 6:1 (0:0, 4:1, 2:0)

6. February 1968 – Grenoble
Goal scorers: Bourbonnais 2, Cadieux, Dinnen, Mott, Huck – Kopf.
Referees: Seglin, Snietkov (URS)

Sweden – (United States) USA 4:3 (0:0, 4:2, 0:1)

7. February 1968 – Grenoble
Goal scorers: Nilsson, Wickberg, Hedlund, Bengsston – Falkman, Lilyholm, Nanne.
Referees: McEvoy, Kubinec (CAN)

(Soviet Union) USSR – East Germany 9:0 (4:0, 2:0, 3:0)

7. February 1968 – Grenoble
Goal scorers: Firsov 3, Vikulov 2, Mishakov, Starshinov, Alexandrov, Zaytsev.
Referees: Wycisk (POL), Johannessen (NOR)

Czechoslovakia – West Germany 5:1 (1:0, 2:0, 2:1)

8. February 1968 – Grenoble
Goal scorers: Hrbatý, Golonka, Havel, Hejma, Ševčík – Lax.
Referees: Kubinec, McEvoy (CAN)

Canada – Finland 2:5 (1:2, 0:1, 1:2)

8. February 1968 – Grenoble
Goal scorers: O’Shea, McMillan – Keinonen, Oksanen, J. Peltonen, Koskela, Wahlsten.
Referees: Trumble (USA), Seglin (URS)

Sweden – West Germany 5:4 (4:3, 0:0, 1:1)

9. February 1968 – Grenoble
Goal scorers: Svedberg, Lundström, Nordlander, Olsson, Öberg – Kuhn, Hanig, Reif, Kopf.
Referees: Kořínek, Bucala (TCH)

(Soviet Union) USSR – (United States) USA 10:2 (6:0, 4:2, 0:0)

9. February 1968 – Grenoble
Goal scorers: Firsov 3, Blinov 2, Polupanov 2, Kuzkin, Starshinov, Moyseyev – Ross, Morrison.
Referees: Dahlberg (SWE), Kubinec (CAN)

Canada – East Germany 11:0 (4:0, 4:0, 3:0)

9. February 1968 – Grenoble
Goal scorers: Mott 4, Huck 2, Hargreaves, O’Shea, Bourbonnais, Monteith, H. Pinder.
Referees: Trumble (USA), Sillankorva (FIN)

Czechoslovakia – Finland 4:3 (0:1, 3:0, 1:2)

10. February 1968 – Grenoble
Goal scorers: Nedomanský 2, Golonka, Havel – Keinonen, Ketola, Oksanen.
Referees: Wiking (SWE), Snětkov (URS)

Sweden – East Germany 5:2 (1:0, 2:1, 2:1)

10. February 1968 – Grenoble
Goal scorers: Hedlund 2, Wickberg, Lundström, Henriksson – Plotka, Fuchs.
Referees: Seglin (URS), Wycisk (POL)

Canada – (United States) USA 3:2 (1:2, 0:0, 2:0)

11. February 1968 – Grenoble
Goal scorers: Cadieux 2, Johnston – Pleau, Riutta.
Referees: Snietkov, Seglin (URS)

(Soviet Union) USSR – West Germany 9:1 (4:1, 4:0, 1:0)

11. February 1968 – Grenoble
Goal scorers: Polupanov 2, Alexandrov 2, Ionov, Starshinov, Mayorov, Moyseyev, Firsov – Funk.
Referees: Trumble (USA), Valentin (AUT)

Czechoslovakia – East Germany 10:3 (5:2, 1:0, 4:1)

12. February 1968 – Grenoble
Goal scorers: Horešovský 4, Nedomanský 2, Jiřík, Suchý, Kochta, Ševčík – Karrenbauer, Novy, Peters.
Referees: Dahlberg (SWE), Sillankorva (FIN)

Sweden – Finland 5:1 (1:0, 2:1, 2:0)

12. February 1968 – Grenoble
Goal scorers: Wickberg 2, Granholm, Nillsson, Bengsston – Oksanen.
Referees: Kubinec (CAN), Kořínek (TCH)

(United States) USA – West Germany 8:1 (2:1, 4:0, 2:0)

12. February 1968 – Grenoble
Goal scorers: Volmar 2, Ross, Morrison, Nanne, Pleau, Cunniff, P. Hurley – Funk.
Referees: McEvoy (CAN), Seglin (URS)

(Soviet Union) USSR – Sweden 3:2 (1:1, 0:0, 2:1)

13. February 1968 – Grenoble
Goal scorers: Firsov 2, Blinov – Öberg, Svedberg.
Referees: Kubinec (CAN), Kořínek (TCH)

Czechoslovakia – Canada 2:3 (0:0, 0:3, 2:0)

13. February 1968 – Grenoble
Goal scorers: Havel, Nedomanský – Huck, Bourbonnais, Cadieux.
Referees: Trumble (USA), Sillankorva (FIN)

East Germany – Finland 2:3 (1:2, 0:1, 1:0)

14. February 1968 – Grenoble
Goal scorers: R. Noack, Peters – Harju 2, Keinonen.
Referees: Bucala (TCH), Dahlberg (SWE)

East Germany – (United States) USA 4:6 (1:3, 1:1, 2:2)

15. February 1968 – Grenoble
Goal scorers: Fuchs 2, Karrenbauer 2 – Stordahl 2, P. Hurley 2, Volmar, Lilyholm.
Referees: Kubinec (CAN), Seglin (URS)

Sweden – Canada 0:3 (0:2, 0:0, 0:1)

15. February 1968 – Grenoble
Goal scorers: Johnston, G. Pinder, O‘Shea.
Referees: Sillankorva (FIN), Kořínek (TCH)

Czechoslovakia – (Soviet Union) USSR 5:4 (3:1, 1:1, 1:2)

15. February 1968 - Grenoble
Goal scorers: Ševčík, Hejma, Havel, Golonka, Jiřík – Mayorov 2, Blinov, Polupanov.
Referees: Trumble (USA), Dahlberg (SWE)

Finland– West Germany 4:1 (2:1, 1:0, 1:0)

16. February 1968 – Grenoble
Goal scorers: Leimu 2, Ketola, J. Peltonen – Schloder.
Referees: Kořínek, Bucala (TCH)

East Germany – West Germany 2:4 (0:1, 1:2, 1:1)

17. February 1968 – Grenoble
Goal scorers: Hiller, Fuchs – Funk, Waitl, Hanig, Lax.
Referees: McEvoy (CAN), Kořínek (TCH)

(United States) USA – Finland 1:1 (1:1, 0:0, 0:0)

17. February 1968 – Grenoble
Goal scorers: Volmar – Wahlsten.
Referees: Kubinec (CAN), Seglin (URS)

Czechoslovakia – Sweden 2:2 (1:1, 1:0, 0:1)

17. February 1968 – Grenoble
Goal scorers: Golonka, Hrbatý – Bengtsson, Henriksson.
Referees: Trumble (USA), Sillankorva (FIN)

(Soviet Union) USSR – Canada 5:0 (1:0, 1:0, 3:0)

17. February 1968 – Grenoble
Goal scorers: Firsov 2, Mishakov, Starshinov, Zimin.
Referees: Trumble (USA), Dahlberg (SWE)

== World Championship Group B (France) ==
=== Consolation round ===
Teams in this group play for 9th-14th places.

Pos	Team	Pld	W	L	D	GF	GA	GD	Pts
9	Yugoslavia	5	5	0	0	33	9	+24	10
10	Japan	5	4	1	0	27	12	+15	8
11	Norway	5	3	2	0	15	15	0	6
12	Romania	5	2	3	0	22	23	−1	4
13	Austria	5	1	4	0	12	27	−15	2
14	France	5	0	5	0	9	32	−23	0

Source: HockeyCanada.ca

(Socialist Federal Republic of Yugoslavia) Yugoslavia – Japan 5:1 (2:0, 0:0, 3:1)

7. February 1968 – Grenoble
Goalscorers: Tisler 2, Beravs, Felc, Mlakar – Iwamoto.

Romania – Austria 3:2 (2:1, 1:1, 0:0)

7. February 1968 – Grenoble
Goalscorers: Fagarasi, Calamar, Mois – Schupp, Samonig.

Norway – France 4:1 (1:1, 2:0, 1:0)

8. February 1968 – Grenoble
Goalscorers: Hagensen, Smefjell, Dalsören, Mikkelsen – Liberman.

France – Romania 3:7 (0:2, 0:2, 3:3)

9. February 1968 – Grenoble
Goalscorers: Itzicsohn, Mazza, Lacarriere – Iuliu Szabo 2, Florescu 2, Pana, Geza Szabo, Stefan.

(Socialist Federal Republic of Yugoslavia) Yugoslavia – Austria 6:0 (2:0, 2:0, 2:0)

9. February 1968 – Grenoble
Goalscorers: Ivo Jan 3, Roman Smolej, Tisler, Klinar.

Japan – Norway 4:0 (2:0, 2:0, 0:0)

10. February 1968 – Grenoble
Goalscorers: Okajima 2, Ebina, Araki.

France – Austria 2:5 (0:1, 2:3, 0:1)

11. February 1968 – Grenoble
Goalscorers: Faucomprez, Caux – Puschnig 2, Kirchbaumer, St. John, Schupp.

Japan – Romania 5:4 (3:0, 1:3, 1:1)

12. February 1968 – Grenoble
Goalscorers: Hikigi 2, Araki, Itoh, Kudo – Florescu, Pana, Mois, Ionescu.

Norway – Austria 5:4 (3:1, 2:1, 0:2)

12. February 1968 – Grenoble
Goalscorers: Dalsören 2, Bjölbak, Olsen, Hansen – Schupp 2, Weingärtner, St. John.

France – (Socialist Federal Republic of Yugoslavia) Yugoslavia 1:10 (0:6, 0:1, 1:3)

13. February 1968 – Grenoble
Goalscorers: Itzicsohn – Tisler 3, Ivo Jan 2, Felc 2, Beravs, Roman Smolej, Hiti.

Norway – Romania 4:3 (2:2, 1:1, 1:0)

14. February 1968 – Grenoble
Goalscorers: Bergeid, Olsen, Syversen, Mikkelsen – Pana, Iuliu Szabo, Czaka.

Japan – Austria 11:1 (1:0, 6:0, 4:1)

15. February 1968 – Grenoble
Goalscorers: Itoh 2, Okajima 2, Hikigi 2, Araki, Kudo, Takashima, Toriyabe, Iwamoto – Puschnig.

(Socialist Federal Republic of Yugoslavia) Yugoslavia – Romania 9:5 (5:3, 1:1, 3:1)

16. February 1968 – Grenoble
Goalscorers: Roman Smolej 2, Tisler 2, Felc 2, Ivo Jan, Hiti, Jug – Iuliu Szabo 2, Tekei, Florescu, Geza Szabo.

France – Japan 2:6 (0:0, 0:4, 2:2)

17. February 1968 – Grenoble
Goalscorers: Mazza, Faucomprez – Ebina 2, Hikigi, Itoh, Okajima, Araki.

(Socialist Federal Republic of Yugoslavia) Yugoslavia – Norway 3:2 (1:1, 0:0, 2:1)

17. February 1968 – Grenoble
Goalscorers: Hiti, Franz Smolej, Ivo Jan - Dalsören, Bjölbak.

== Statistics ==
=== Average age ===
Gold medalists Team USSR was the oldest team in the tournament, averaging 26 years and 9 months. Team France was the youngest team in the tournament, averaging 22 years and 5 months. Tournament average was 24 years and 10 months.

=== Leading scorers ===
Rk	Team	Player	GP	G	A	Pts
1	(Soviet Union)	Anatoli Firsov	7	12	4	16
2	(Soviet Union)	Viktor Polupanov	7	6	6	12
2	(Soviet Union)	Viacheslav Starshinov	7	6	6	12
4	(Soviet Union)	Vladimir Vikulov	7	2	10	12
5	(Czechoslovakia)	Jozef Golonka	7	4	6	10
6	(Canada)	Fran Huck	7	4	5	9
7	(Czechoslovakia)	Jan Hrbatý	7	2	7	9
8	(Canada)	Marshall Johnston	7	2	6	8
8	(United States)	Jack Morrison	7	2	6	8
10	(Czechoslovakia)	Václav Nedomanský	7	5	2	7

=== Leading scorers–Consolation round ===
Rk	Team	Player	GP	G	A	Pts
1	(Socialist Federal Republic of Yugoslavia)	Albin Felc	5	5	6	11
2	(Socialist Federal Republic of Yugoslavia)	Viktor Tišler	5	8	2	10
2	(Socialist Federal Republic of Yugoslavia)	Ivo Jan	5	6	2	8
4	(Japan)	Takao Hikigi	5	5	3	8
5	(Romania)	Iuliu Szabo	5	4	4	8

== Final ranking ==
1. Soviet Union
2. Czechoslovakia
3. Canada
4. Sweden
5. Finland
6. United States
7. West Germany
8. East Germany
9. Yugoslavia
10. Japan
11. Norway
12. Romania
13. Austria
14. France

== European Championship final ranking ==
1. Soviet Union
2. Czechoslovakia
3. Sweden
4. Finland
5. West Germany
6. East Germany
7. Yugoslavia
8. Norway
9. Romania
10. Austria
11. France

== IIHF Awards ==
Best Goaltender	(Canada) Ken Broderick
Best Defenceman	(Czechoslovakia) Josef Horešovský
Best Forward	(Soviet Union) Anatoli Firsov
