= List of Olympic ice hockey players for Yugoslavia =

Men's ice hockey tournaments have been staged at the Olympic Games since 1920. The men's tournament was introduced at the 1920 Summer Olympics, and permanently added to the Winter Olympic Games in 1924. Yugoslavia participated in five tournaments, from 1964 until 1976, and again in 1984, when they hosted the games in Sarajevo. A total of 6 goaltenders and 53 skaters participated from Yugoslavia.

Albin Felc scored the most goals, 17, and points, 23, while Gorazd Hiti had the most assists, 8. Nine skaters and one goaltender played in three separate Olympics, while four players each played in 19 games, the most for Yugoslavia at the Olympics.

== Key ==
General terms
Term	Definition
GP	Games played
IIHFHOF	International Ice Hockey Federation Hall of Fame
Olympics	Number of Olympic Games tournaments
Ref(s)	Reference(s)

Goaltender statistical abbreviations
Abbreviation	Definition
W	Wins
L	Losses
T	Ties
Min	Minutes played
SO	Shutouts
GA	Goals against
GAA	Goals against average

Skater statistical abbreviations
Abbreviation	Definition
G	Goals
A	Assists
P	Points
PIM	Penalty minutes

== Goaltenders ==
Goaltenders
Player	Olympics	Tournament(s)	GP	W	L	T	Min	SO	GA	GAA	Notes	Ref(s)
Janez Albreht	1	1976	–	–	–	–	–	–	–	–		
Anton Jože Gale	3	1964, 1968, 1972	–	–	–	–	–	–	–	–		
Rudolf Knez	2	1968, 1972	–	–	–	–	–	–	–	–		
Cveto Pretnar	1	1984	–	–	–	–	–	–	–	–		
Rašid Šemšedinović	1	1964	–	–	–	–	–	–	–	–		
Marjan Zbontar	1	1976	–	–	–	–	–	–	–	–		

== Skaters ==
Skaters
Player	Olympics	Tournaments	GP	G	A	P	PIM	Notes	Ref(s)
Aleksandar Anđelić	1	1964	7	0	0	0	0		
Božidar Beravs	2	1972, 1976	8	0	1	1	4		
Slavko Beravs	2	1968, 1972	10	3	3	6	2		
Igor Beribak	1	1984	5	0	0	0	2		
Mustafa Bešić	1	1984	5	3	0	3	2		
Dejan Burnik	1	1984	5	0	0	0	2		
Miroljub Đorđević	1	1964	8	3	0	3	0		
Albin Felc	3	1964, 1968, 1972	19	17	7	24	6		
Miroslav Gojanović	2	1968, 1976	10	1	1	2	0		
Marjan Gorenc	1	1984	5	0	0	0	0		
Eduard Hafner	2	1976, 1984	11	5	3	8	0		
Gorazd Hiti	3	1972, 1976, 1984	16	3	8	11	4		
Rudi Hiti	2	1968, 1972	9	3	2	5	12	IIHFHOF (2009)	
Mirko Holbus	1	1964	8	0	0	0	0		
Drago Horvat	1	1984	5	0	0	0	0		
Bogdan Jakopič	1	1976	6	1	0	1	6		
Ivo Jan	3	1964, 1968, 1972	19	9	2	11	2		
Jože Bogomir Jan	3	1964, 1968, 1972	18	4	0	4	6		
Lado Jug	1	1968	5	1	2	3	0		
Ignac Kavec	1	1976	5	2	3	5	4		
Peter Klemenc	1	1984	5	0	0	0	0		
Ciril Klinar	1	1968	6	1	3	4	2		
Jože Kovač	1	1984	5	0	0	0	0		
Marijan Kristan	1	1964	8	0	0	0	0		
Miran Krmelj	1	1964	6	0	0	0	0		
Bojan Kumar	2	1972, 1976	7	0	0	0	23		
Vojko Lajovec	1	1984	5	0	0	0	0		
Miroslav Lap	1	1976	6	1	1	2	2		
Tomaž Lepša	2	1976, 1984	11	2	0	2	2		
Blaž Lomovšek	1	1984	5	0	0	0	4		
Janez Mlakar	1	1968	6	1	2	3	6		
Drago Mlinarec	1	1984	5	0	1	1	12		
Murajica Pajič	1	1984	5	0	0	0	6		
Janez Petač	1	1976	6	1	0	1	0		
Silvo Poljanšek	2	1972, 1976	10	1	2	3	2		
Janez Puterle	2	1972, 1976	9	4	2	6	10		
Igor Radin	1	1964	7	0	0	0	0		
Ivo Ratej	3	1964, 1968, 1972	17	0	0	0	4		
Viktor Ravnik	3	1964, 1968, 1972	19	0	3	3	6		
Franc-Rado Razinger	1	1968	5	0	0	0	0		
Bojan Razpet	1	1984	5	0	0	0	0		
Boris Renaud	3	1964, 1968, 1972	17	5	0	5	6		
Drago Savić	2	1972, 1976	9	0	1	1	6		
Ivan Ščap	2	1976, 1984	11	1	1	2	12		
Matjaž Sekelj	1	1984	5	2	0	2	4		
Štefan Seme	1	1972	2	0	1	1	0		
Franc Smolej	2	1964, 1968	14	7	2	9	2		
Roman Smolej	3	1968, 1972, 1976	15	6	6	12	4		
Zvonko Šuvak	1	1984	2	0	0	0	0		
Viktor Tišler	3	1964, 1968, 1972	19	14	2	16	4		
Vinko Valentar	1	1964	8	1	0	1	0		
Andrej Vidmar	1	1984	5	0	0	0	2		
Franci Žbontar	2	1972, 1976	11	5	5	10	6		
