= Ice hockey at the 1976 Winter Olympics – Rosters =

The ice hockey team rosters at the 1976 Winter Olympics consisted of the following players:

== Austria ==
Head coach: (Soviet Union) Yuri Baulin

No.	Pos.	Name	Height	Weight	Birthdate	Team
-	G	Daniel Gritsch	-	-	March 14, 1954 (aged 21)	(Austria) ECS Innsbruck
-	D	Gerhard Hausner (C)	6 ft 1 in (185 cm)	198 lb (90 kg)	September 25, 1947 (aged 28)	(Austria) Wiener EV
-	D	Michael Herzog	6 ft 1 in (185 cm)	192 lb (87 kg)	February 27, 1952 (aged 23)	(Austria) ATSE Graz
-	F	Rudolf König	6 ft 0 in (183 cm)	176 lb (80 kg)	April 25, 1957 (aged 18)	(Austria) EC KAC
-	F	Josef Kriechbaum	-	-	April 26, 1949 (aged 26)	(Austria) HC Salzburg
-	F	Max Moser	-	-	September 24, 1949 (aged 26)	(Austria) ATSE Graz
-	F	Herbert Mörtl	5 ft 9 in (175 cm)	150 lb (68 kg)	November 4, 1948 (aged 27)	(Austria) VEU Feldkirch
-	D	Günter Oberhuber	-	-	April 22, 1954 (aged 21)	N/A
-	F	Herbert Pöck	5 ft 10 in (178 cm)	181 lb (82 kg)	March 8, 1957 (aged 18)	(Austria) EC KAC
-	F	Josef Puschnig (C)	5 ft 10 in (178 cm)	196 lb (89 kg)	September 12, 1946 (aged 29)	(Austria) EC KAC
-	D	Othmar Russ	5 ft 9 in (175 cm)	159 lb (72 kg)	November 2, 1952 (aged 23)	(Austria) ATSE Graz
-	F	Alexander Sadjina	5 ft 8 in (173 cm)	148 lb (67 kg)	November 14, 1954 (aged 21)	(Austria) EC KAC
-	G	Franz Schilcher	5 ft 9 in (175 cm)	170 lb (77 kg)	August 19, 1943 (aged 32)	(Austria) ATSE Graz
-	F	Walter Schneider	6 ft 1 in (185 cm)	198 lb (90 kg)	August 22, 1953 (aged 22)	(Austria) Wiener EV
-	D/F	Johann Schuller	6 ft 0 in (183 cm)	170 lb (77 kg)	August 5, 1953 (aged 22)	(Austria) Wiener EV
-	F	Josef Schwitzer	-	-	October 31, 1946 (aged 29)	(Austria) ECS Innsbruck
-	F	Franz Voves	-	-	February 28, 1953 (aged 22)	(Austria) ATSE Graz
-	F	Peter Zini	-	-	October 3, 1951 (aged 24)	(Austria) ECS Innsbruck

== Bulgaria ==
No.	Pos.	Name	Height	Weight	Birthdate	Team
1	G	Petar Radev	5 ft 7 in (170 cm)	154 lb (70 kg)	July 6, 1948 (aged 27)	N/A
2	D	Ivan Markovski	5 ft 10 in (178 cm)	163 lb (74 kg)	August 18, 1955 (aged 20)	N/A
3	D	Nikolay Petrov	5 ft 7 in (170 cm)	148 lb (67 kg)	September 9, 1957 (aged 18)	N/A
4	D	Dimo Krastinov	5 ft 11 in (180 cm)	179 lb (81 kg)	January 20, 1945 (aged 31)	N/A
5	D/F	Dimitri Lazarov	5 ft 10 in (178 cm)	170 lb (77 kg)	June 18, 1946 (aged 29)	(Bulgaria) Levski-Spartak Sofia
6	D	Ivan Penelov	5 ft 8 in (173 cm)	165 lb (75 kg)	May 18, 1948 (aged 27)	N/A
7	D/F	Lyubomir Lyubomirov	5 ft 11 in (180 cm)	163 lb (74 kg)	December 2, 1953 (aged 22)	(Bulgaria) Levski-Spartak Sofia
8	F	Iliya Bachvarov (C)	-	-	October 10, 1943 (aged 32)	(Bulgaria) HC CSKA Sofia
9	F	Bozhidar Minchev	-	-	August 1, 1946 (aged 29)	N/A
10	F	Miltcho Nenov	6 ft 1 in (185 cm)	181 lb (82 kg)	December 19, 1951 (aged 24)	N/A
11	G	Atanas Iliev	5 ft 9 in (175 cm)	150 lb (68 kg)	February 2, 1943 (aged 33)	(Bulgaria) Levski-Spartak Sofia
13	F	Ivan Atanasov	5 ft 8 in (173 cm)	163 lb (74 kg)	April 30, 1952 (aged 23)	(Bulgaria) Levski-Spartak Sofia
14	F	Kiril Gerasimov	6 ft 0 in (183 cm)	176 lb (80 kg)	February 3, 1946 (aged 30)	(Bulgaria) HC CSKA Sofia
15	D	Georgi Iliev	5 ft 8 in (173 cm)	143 lb (65 kg)	January 18, 1946 (aged 30)	(Bulgaria) Levski-Spartak Sofia
16	F	Marin Bachvarov	5 ft 9 in (175 cm)	165 lb (75 kg)	June 30, 1947 (aged 28)	(Bulgaria) Levski-Spartak Sofia
18	F	Malin Atanasov	5 ft 9 in (175 cm)	154 lb (70 kg)	June 14, 1946 (aged 29)	(Bulgaria) HC CSKA Sofia
19	F	Nikolay Mikhaylov	5 ft 6 in (168 cm)	176 lb (80 kg)	February 19, 1948 (aged 27)	N/A
20	F	Ivaylo Kalev	5 ft 9 in (175 cm)	150 lb (68 kg)	May 9, 1946 (aged 29)	(Bulgaria) HC CSKA Sofia

== Czechoslovakia ==
Head coach: Karel Gut

Assistant coach: Ján Starší

No.	Pos.	Name	Height	Weight	Birthdate	Team
1	G	Jiří Crha	5 ft 11 in (180 cm)	168 lb (76 kg)	April 13, 1950 (aged 25)	(Czechoslovakia) TJ Pardubice
2	G	Jiří Holeček	5 ft 11 in (180 cm)	163 lb (74 kg)	March 18, 1944 (aged 31)	(Czechoslovakia) TJ Sparta Praha
4	D	Oldřich Machač	5 ft 9 in (175 cm)	198 lb (90 kg)	April 18, 1946 (aged 29)	(Czechoslovakia) TJ Brno
5	D	Milan Chalupa	5 ft 10 in (178 cm)	185 lb (84 kg)	July 4, 1953 (aged 22)	(Czechoslovakia) ASD Dukla Jihlava
6	F	Milan Nový	5 ft 10 in (178 cm)	196 lb (89 kg)	September 23, 1951 (aged 24)	(Czechoslovakia) TJ Kladno
7	D	František Pospíšil (C)	6 ft 0 in (183 cm)	185 lb (84 kg)	April 2, 1944 (aged 31)	(Czechoslovakia) TJ Kladno
8	G	Pavol Svitana	-	-	September 2, 1948 (aged 27)	(Czechoslovakia) HC Košice
9	D	Miroslav Dvořák	5 ft 10 in (178 cm)	198 lb (90 kg)	October 11, 1951 (aged 24)	(Czechoslovakia) TJ Motor Česke Budějovice
10	F	Vladimír Martinec	5 ft 8 in (173 cm)	185 lb (84 kg)	December 22, 1949 (aged 26)	(Czechoslovakia) TJ Pardubice
11	F	Jiří Novák	5 ft 7 in (170 cm)	163 lb (74 kg)	June 6, 1950 (aged 25)	(Czechoslovakia) TJ Pardubice
12	F	Bohuslav Šťastný	5 ft 11 in (180 cm)	183 lb (83 kg)	April 23, 1949 (aged 26)	(Czechoslovakia) TJ Pardubice
17	D	Milan Kajkl	6 ft 0 in (183 cm)	194 lb (88 kg)	May 14, 1950 (aged 25)	(Czechoslovakia) TJ Plzeň
19	D	Jiří Bubla	5 ft 11 in (180 cm)	201 lb (91 kg)	January 27, 1950 (aged 26)	(Czechoslovakia) TJ Litvinov
20	F	Jiří Holík	5 ft 11 in (180 cm)	176 lb (80 kg)	July 9, 1944 (aged 31)	(Czechoslovakia) ASD Dukla Jihlava
21	F	Ivan Hlinka	6 ft 0 in (183 cm)	183 lb (83 kg)	January 26, 1950 (aged 26)	(Czechoslovakia) TJ Litvinov
22	F	Eduard Novák	5 ft 11 in (180 cm)	190 lb (86 kg)	November 27, 1946 (aged 29)	(Czechoslovakia) TJ Kladno
23	F	Jaroslav Pouzar	6 ft 0 in (183 cm)	203 lb (92 kg)	January 23, 1952 (aged 24)	(Czechoslovakia) TJ Motor Česke Budějovice
25	F	Bohuslav Ebermann	6 ft 0 in (183 cm)	183 lb (83 kg)	September 19, 1948 (aged 27)	(Czechoslovakia) TJ Plzeň
26	F	Josef Augusta	5 ft 10 in (178 cm)	190 lb (86 kg)	November 24, 1946 (aged 29)	(Czechoslovakia) ASD Dukla Jihlava

== Finland ==
Head coach: Seppo Liitsola

Assistant coach: Lasse Heikkilä

No.	Pos.	Name	Height	Weight	Birthdate	Team
1	G	Urpo Ylönen	5 ft 8 in (173 cm)	165 lb (75 kg)	May 25, 1943 (aged 32)	(Finland) TPS
2	D	Reijo Laksola	5 ft 11 in (180 cm)	185 lb (84 kg)	August 10, 1952 (aged 23)	(Finland) KOOVEE
3	D	Timo Nummelin	5 ft 10 in (178 cm)	190 lb (86 kg)	September 7, 1948 (aged 27)	(Finland) TPS
4	D	Seppo Lindström (C)	5 ft 11 in (180 cm)	187 lb (85 kg)	May 16, 1941 (aged 34)	(Finland) TPS
6	D	Hannu Haapalainen	-	-	February 28, 1951 (aged 24)	(Finland) Tappara
7	D	Pekka Marjamäki	6 ft 1 in (185 cm)	207 lb (94 kg)	December 18, 1947 (aged 28)	(Finland) Tappara
9	D	Timo Saari	6 ft 2 in (188 cm)	181 lb (82 kg)	January 14, 1949 (aged 26)	(Finland) Jokerit
10	F	Seppo Ahokainen	5 ft 10 in (178 cm)	181 lb (82 kg)	January 19, 1952 (aged 24)	(Finland) Ilves
11	F	Henry Leppä	5 ft 11 in (180 cm)	163 lb (74 kg)	March 12, 1947 (aged 28)	(Finland) Jokerit
8	F	Jorma Vehmanen	5 ft 10 in (178 cm)	174 lb (79 kg)	September 18, 1945 (aged 26)	(Finland) HJK
12	F	Esa Peltonen	5 ft 10 in (178 cm)	176 lb (80 kg)	February 25, 1947 (aged 28)	(Finland) HIFK
14	F	Tapio Koskinen	5 ft 10 in (178 cm)	172 lb (78 kg)	January 22, 1953 (aged 23)	(Finland) Ässät
17	F	Matti Murto	5 ft 11 in (180 cm)	185 lb (84 kg)	April 9, 1949 (aged 26)	(Finland) HIFK
18	G	Antti Leppänen	6 ft 0 in (183 cm)	214 lb (97 kg)	November 23, 1947 (aged 28)	(Finland) Tappara
19	F	Pertti Koivulahti	5 ft 9 in (175 cm)	161 lb (73 kg)	June 7, 1951 (aged 24)	(Finland) Tappara
20	F	Matti Hagman	6 ft 0 in (183 cm)	183 lb (83 kg)	September 21, 1955 (aged 20)	(Finland) HIFK
21	F	Hannu Kapanen	5 ft 10 in (178 cm)	168 lb (76 kg)	March 13, 1951 (aged 24)	(Finland) Jokerit
22	F	Jorma Vehmanen	5 ft 10 in (178 cm)	174 lb (79 kg)	September 18, 1945 (aged 30)	(Finland) Lukko
24	F	Matti Rautiainen	5 ft 9 in (175 cm)	176 lb (80 kg)	October 7, 1955 (aged 20)	(Finland) KOOVEE

== Japan ==
Head coach: Yoshihiro Miyazaki

No.	Pos.	Name	Height	Weight	Birthdate	Team
-	F	Yoshiaki Kyoya	5 ft 7 in (170 cm)	157 lb (71 kg)	April 5, 1951 (aged 24)	N/A
1	G	Toshimitsu Otsubo	5 ft 7 in (170 cm)	148 lb (67 kg)	April 4, 1945 (aged 30)	N/A
2	G	Minoru Misawa	5 ft 6 in (168 cm)	137 lb (62 kg)	May 1, 1949 (aged 26)	N/A
3	D	Hiroshi Hori	5 ft 7 in (170 cm)	148 lb (67 kg)	September 19, 1949 (aged 26)	N/A
4	D	Iwao Nakayama	5 ft 6 in (168 cm)	148 lb (67 kg)	July 2, 1949 (aged 26)	N/A
5	D	Hitoshi Nakamura	5 ft 8 in (173 cm)	159 lb (72 kg)	April 29, 1949 (aged 26)	N/A
6	F	Hideo Urabe	5 ft 9 in (175 cm)	170 lb (77 kg)	April 7, 1954 (aged 21)	N/A
7	F	Yoshiaki Kyoya	5 ft 7 in (170 cm)	157 lb (71 kg)	April 5, 1951 (aged 24)	N/A
8	F	Minoru Ito	5 ft 7 in (170 cm)	159 lb (72 kg)	March 26, 1948 (aged 27)	(Japan) Iwakura Tomakomai
9	D	Kiyoshi Esashika	5 ft 6 in (168 cm)	154 lb (70 kg)	September 23, 1948 (aged 27)	(Japan) Oji Seishi
10	F	Takeshi Azuma	5 ft 6 in (168 cm)	152 lb (69 kg)	January 9, 1953 (aged 23)	(Japan) Oji Seishi
11	F	Takeshi Akiba	5 ft 8 in (173 cm)	154 lb (70 kg)	May 4, 1944 (aged 31)	(Japan) Iwakura Tomakomai
12	F	Sadaki Honma	5 ft 9 in (175 cm)	161 lb (73 kg)	June 4, 1953 (aged 22)	N/A
13	F	Hideo Sakurai	5 ft 6 in (168 cm)	154 lb (70 kg)	August 14, 1948 (aged 27)	N/A
16	F	Tsutomu Hanzawa	5 ft 3 in (160 cm)	139 lb (63 kg)	August 28, 1948 (aged 27)	N/A
18	F	Herb Wakabayashi	5 ft 5 in (165 cm)	154 lb (70 kg)	December 23, 1944 (aged 31)	N/A
21	F	Yasushio Tanaka (C)	5 ft 10 in (178 cm)	185 lb (84 kg)	August 18, 1945 (aged 30)	N/A
22	D	Koji Wakasa	5 ft 11 in (180 cm)	179 lb (81 kg)	July 12, 1953 (aged 22)	N/A
23	F	Yoshio Hoshino	5 ft 11 in (180 cm)	176 lb (80 kg)	November 2, 1950 (aged 25)	N/A

== Poland ==
Head coach: Józef Kurek

No.	Pos.	Name	Height	Weight	Birthdate	Team
1	G	Andrzej Tkacz	5 ft 9 in (175 cm)	148 lb (67 kg)	September 20, 1946 (aged 29)	(Poland) GKS Katowice
2	G	Walery Kosyl	5 ft 10 in (178 cm)	176 lb (80 kg)	March 17, 1944 (aged 31)	(Poland) ŁKS Łódź
3	D	Andrzej Słowakiewicz	5 ft 10 in (178 cm)	176 lb (80 kg)	January 27, 1951 (aged 25)	(Poland) Podhale Nowy Targ
4	D	Andrzej Iskrzycki	5 ft 9 in (175 cm)	168 lb (76 kg)	November 20, 1951 (aged 24)	(Poland) Podhale Nowy Targ
5	D/F	Robert Góralczyk (C)	5 ft 7 in (170 cm)	159 lb (72 kg)	March 21, 1943 (aged 32)	(Poland) Baildon Katowice
7	F	Stefan Chowaniec	5 ft 5 in (165 cm)	148 lb (67 kg)	April 21, 1953 (aged 22)	(Poland) Podhale Nowy Targ
8	F	Wiesław Jobczyk	5 ft 8 in (173 cm)	170 lb (77 kg)	February 23, 1954 (aged 21)	(Poland) Baildon Katowice
9	F	Tadeusz Obłój	5 ft 9 in (175 cm)	174 lb (79 kg)	August 29, 1950 (aged 25)	(Poland) Baildon Katowice
10	F	Karol Żurek	5 ft 10 in (178 cm)	170 lb (77 kg)	January 28, 1949 (aged 27)	(Poland) Baildon Katowice
11	F	Leszek Kokoszka	5 ft 7 in (170 cm)	163 lb (74 kg)	April 11, 1951 (aged 24)	(Poland) Legia Warszawa
12	F	Walenty Ziętara	5 ft 8 in (173 cm)	159 lb (72 kg)	October 27, 1948 (aged 27)	(Poland) Podhale Nowy Targ
15	F	Andrzej Zabawa	5 ft 8 in (173 cm)	146 lb (66 kg)	November 29, 1955 (aged 20)	(Poland) Baildon Katowice
16	F	Henryk Pytel	5 ft 9 in (175 cm)	159 lb (72 kg)	September 15, 1955 (aged 20)	(Poland) Zagłębie Sosnowiec
17	F	Mieczysław Jaskierski	5 ft 10 in (178 cm)	172 lb (78 kg)	December 17, 1950 (aged 25)	(Poland) Podhale Nowy Targ
19	D	Kordian Jajszczok	5 ft 8 in (173 cm)	165 lb (75 kg)	September 10, 1950 (aged 25)	(Poland) GKS Katowice
20	D	Jerzy Potz	5 ft 11 in (180 cm)	187 lb (85 kg)	February 1, 1953 (aged 23)	(Poland) ŁKS Łódź
22	F	Marian Kajzerek	5 ft 7 in (170 cm)	163 lb (74 kg)	August 27, 1946 (aged 29)	(Poland) Naprzód Janów
25	D	Marek Marcińczak	5 ft 10 in (178 cm)	168 lb (76 kg)	January 19, 1954 (aged 22)	(Poland) GKS Katowice

== Romania ==
Head coach: Ștefan Ionescu

Assistant coach: Ion Tiron

No.	Pos.	Name	Height	Weight	Birthdate	Team
1	G	Valerian Netedu	5 ft 9 in (175 cm)	172 lb (78 kg)	January 26, 1953 (aged 23)	(Romania) Steaua București
2	F	Alexandru Hălăucă	6 ft 0 in (183 cm)	183 lb (83 kg)	August 12, 1957 (aged 18)	(Romania) Steaua București
3	D	Ion Ioniță	5 ft 11 in (180 cm)	174 lb (79 kg)	January 9, 1951 (aged 25)	(Romania) Steaua București
4	D	Dezső Varga (C)	5 ft 10 in (178 cm)	176 lb (80 kg)	May 14, 1939 (aged 36)	(Romania) Steaua București
5	D	Șandor Gal	5 ft 9 in (175 cm)	187 lb (85 kg)	November 23, 1955 (aged 20)	(Romania) SC Miercurea Ciuc
6	F	Doru Tureanu	5 ft 10 in (178 cm)	181 lb (82 kg)	January 11, 1954 (aged 22)	(Romania) Dinamo Bucuresti
7	F	Dumitru Axinte	5 ft 7 in (170 cm)	170 lb (77 kg)	May 9, 1952 (aged 19)	(Romania) Dinamo Bucuresti
8	D	Elöd Antal	5 ft 7 in (170 cm)	168 lb (76 kg)	March 11, 1955 (aged 20)	(Romania) SC Miercurea Ciuc
10	F	Marian Costea	5 ft 6 in (168 cm)	157 lb (71 kg)	June 13, 1952 (aged 23)	(Romania) Dinamo Bucuresti
11	F	Tiberiu Mikloș	5 ft 9 in (175 cm)	159 lb (72 kg)	April 2, 1954 (aged 21)	(Romania) Steaua București
13	F	Ioan Gheorghiu	5 ft 9 in (175 cm)	146 lb (66 kg)	March 5, 1947 (aged 28)	(Romania) Steaua București
14	D	Doru Moroșan	6 ft 1 in (185 cm)	185 lb (84 kg)	May 13, 1953 (aged 22)	N/A
15	F	Eduard Pană	5 ft 8 in (173 cm)	163 lb (74 kg)	May 28, 1944 (aged 31)	(Romania) Dinamo Bucuresti
18	D	Nicolae Vișan	5 ft 8 in (173 cm)	161 lb (73 kg)	February 26, 1953 (aged 22)	N/A
19	D	George Justinian	6 ft 0 in (183 cm)	190 lb (86 kg)	January 25, 1954 (aged 22)	(Romania) Steaua București
21	F	Marian Pisaru	5 ft 7 in (170 cm)	150 lb (68 kg)	January 4, 1954 (aged 22)	N/A
23	F	Vasile Huțanu	5 ft 10 in (178 cm)	152 lb (69 kg)	June 1, 1954 (aged 21)	N/A
24	G	Vasile Morar	5 ft 9 in (175 cm)	172 lb (78 kg)	June 23, 1952 (aged 23)	N/A

== Soviet Union ==
Head coach: Boris Kulagin

Assistant coaches: Vladimir Yurzinov, Konstantin Loktev

No.	Pos.	Name	Height	Weight	Birthdate	Team
1	G	Vladislav Tretiak	6 ft 0 in (183 cm)	201 lb (91 kg)	April 25, 1952 (aged 23)	(Soviet Union) CSKA Moskva
2	D	Alexander Gusev	6 ft 0 in (183 cm)	198 lb (90 kg)	January 21, 1947 (aged 29)	(Soviet Union) CSKA Moskva
3	D	Vladimir Lutchenko	6 ft 1 in (185 cm)	203 lb (92 kg)	January 2, 1949 (aged 27)	(Soviet Union) CSKA Moskva
4	D	Sergei Babinov	5 ft 11 in (180 cm)	183 lb (83 kg)	July 11, 1955 (aged 20)	(Soviet Union) Krylia Sovetov Moskva
5	D	Yuri Lyapkin	6 ft 0 in (183 cm)	192 lb (87 kg)	January 21, 1945 (aged 31)	(Soviet Union) Spartak Moskva
6	D	Valeri Vasiliev	6 ft 0 in (183 cm)	190 lb (86 kg)	August 3, 1949 (aged 26)	(Soviet Union) Dynamo Moskva
7	D	Gennady Tsygankov	5 ft 11 in (180 cm)	209 lb (95 kg)	August 16, 1947 (aged 28)	(Soviet Union) CSKA Moskva
8	F	Sergei Kapustin	5 ft 11 in (180 cm)	192 lb (87 kg)	February 13, 1953 (aged 22)	(Soviet Union) Krylia Sovetov Moskva
9	F	Viktor Shalimov	5 ft 10 in (178 cm)	176 lb (80 kg)	April 20, 1951 (aged 24)	(Soviet Union) Spartak Moskva
10	F	Alexander Maltsev	5 ft 9 in (175 cm)	170 lb (77 kg)	April 20, 1949 (aged 26)	(Soviet Union) Dynamo Moskva
11	F	Boris Alexandrov	5 ft 9 in (175 cm)	181 lb (82 kg)	November 13, 1955 (aged 20)	(Soviet Union) CSKA Moskva
13	F	Boris Mikhailov (C)	5 ft 9 in (175 cm)	163 lb (74 kg)	June 10, 1944 (aged 31)	(Soviet Union) CSKA Moskva
15	F	Alexander Yakushev	6 ft 3 in (191 cm)	201 lb (91 kg)	January 2, 1947 (aged 29)	(Soviet Union) Spartak Moskva
16	F	Vladimir Petrov	6 ft 0 in (183 cm)	196 lb (89 kg)	June 30, 1947 (aged 28)	(Soviet Union) CSKA Moskva
17	F	Valeri Kharlamov	5 ft 8 in (173 cm)	161 lb (73 kg)	January 14, 1948 (aged 28)	(Soviet Union) CSKA Moskva
19	F	Vladimir Shadrin	5 ft 11 in (180 cm)	187 lb (85 kg)	June 6, 1948 (aged 27)	(Soviet Union) Spartak Moskva
20	G	Alexander Sidelnikov	5 ft 9 in (175 cm)	181 lb (82 kg)	August 12, 1950 (aged 25)	(Soviet Union) Krylia Sovetov Moskva
22	F	Viktor Zhluktov	6 ft 2 in (188 cm)	209 lb (95 kg)	January 26, 1954 (aged 22)	(Soviet Union) CSKA Moskva

== Switzerland ==
Head coach: Rudolf Killias

No.	Pos.	Name	Height	Weight	Birthdate	Team
-	F	Rolf Tschiemer	-	-	October 23, 1951 (aged 24)	(Switzerland) SC Langau
1	G	Alfio Molina	5 ft 9 in (175 cm)	154 lb (70 kg)	April 20, 1948 (aged 27)	(Switzerland) HC Lugano
2	D	Charles Henzen (C)	5 ft 8 in (173 cm)	172 lb (78 kg)	October 4, 1945 (aged 30)	(Switzerland) HC Sierre
3	D	Andreas "Res" Meyer	5 ft 10 in (178 cm)	165 lb (75 kg)	October 22, 1954 (aged 21)	(Switzerland) SC Langau
4	D	Jakob Kölliker	6 ft 1 in (185 cm)	190 lb (86 kg)	July 21, 1953 (aged 22)	(Switzerland) EHC Biel-Bienne
6	D	Ueli Hofmann	5 ft 11 in (180 cm)	192 lb (87 kg)	September 1, 1953 (aged 22)	(Switzerland) SC Bern
7	D/F	Ernst Lüthi	5 ft 9 in (175 cm)	141 lb (64 kg)	February 20, 1954 (aged 21)	(Switzerland) SC Langau
8	D	Aldo Zenhäusern	5 ft 11 in (180 cm)	172 lb (78 kg)	August 3, 1951 (aged 24)	(Switzerland) EHC Biel-Bienne
9	F	Nando Mathieu	5 ft 8 in (173 cm)	154 lb (70 kg)	December 22, 1949 (aged 26)	N/A
11	F	Bernhard Neininger	5 ft 9 in (175 cm)	141 lb (64 kg)	October 19, 1955 (aged 20)	(Switzerland) HC La Chaux-de-Fonds
12	F	Anton Neininger	5 ft 7 in (170 cm)	141 lb (64 kg)	August 10, 1950 (aged 25)	(Switzerland) HC La Chaux-de-Fonds
13	F	Renzo Holzer	6 ft 1 in (185 cm)	187 lb (85 kg)	March 9, 1952 (aged 23)	(Switzerland) SC Bern
14	F/D	Guy Dubois	5 ft 9 in (175 cm)	172 lb (78 kg)	January 14, 1950 (aged 26)	(Switzerland) HC La Chaux-de-Fonds
15	F	Georg Mattli	5 ft 9 in (175 cm)	150 lb (68 kg)	October 18, 1954 (aged 21)	(Switzerland) EHC Kloten
16	F	Jürg Berger	5 ft 11 in (180 cm)	176 lb (80 kg)	February 5, 1954 (aged 22)	(Switzerland) SC Langau
17	F	Walter Dürst	5 ft 10 in (178 cm)	168 lb (76 kg)	June 4, 1950 (aged 25)	(Switzerland) HC Davos
20	G	André Jorns	5 ft 5 in (165 cm)	150 lb (68 kg)	January 11, 1951 (aged 25)	(Switzerland) HC Ambrì-Piotta
22	F	Daniel Widmer	5 ft 10 in (178 cm)	176 lb (80 kg)	April 29, 1953 (aged 22)	(Switzerland) EHC Biel-Bienne

== United States ==
Head coach: Bob Johnson

Assistant coach: (Canada) Grant Standbrook

No.	Pos.	Name	Height	Weight	Birthdate	Team
1	G	Blane Comstock	5 ft 8 in (173 cm)	161 lb (73 kg)	November 3, 1949 (aged 26)	
3	D	John Taft (C)	6 ft 2 in (188 cm)	194 lb (88 kg)	March 8, 1954 (aged 21)	(United States) Wisconsin Badgers
4	D	Gary Ross	6 ft 2 in (188 cm)	205 lb (93 kg)	December 18, 1953 (aged 22)	(United States) Bemidji State Beavers
6	D	Paul Jensen	5 ft 11 in (180 cm)	181 lb (82 kg)	May 1, 1955 (aged 20)	(United States) Michigan Tech Huskies
7	F	Steve Sertich	5 ft 7 in (170 cm)	154 lb (70 kg)	October 20, 1952 (aged 23)	(Germany) EV Füssen
8	D/F	Bob Lundeen	5 ft 11 in (180 cm)	185 lb (84 kg)	November 4, 1952 (aged 23)	(United States) Wisconsin Badgers
9	F	Bob Miller	5 ft 10 in (178 cm)	174 lb (79 kg)	September 28, 1956 (aged 19)	(United States) New Hampshire Wildcats
10	F	Steve Jensen	6 ft 2 in (188 cm)	190 lb (86 kg)	April 14, 1955 (aged 20)	(United States) Michigan Tech Huskies
11	F	Steve Alley	6 ft 0 in (183 cm)	185 lb (84 kg)	December 29, 1953 (aged 22)	(United States) Wisconsin Badgers
12	F	Rob Harris	6 ft 0 in (183 cm)	181 lb (82 kg)	December 4, 1953 (aged 22)	(United States) Minnesota Golden Gophers
14	F	Buzz Schneider	5 ft 11 in (180 cm)	181 lb (82 kg)	September 14, 1954 (aged 21)	(United States) Minnesota Golden Gophers
16	F	Ted Thorndike	6 ft 0 in (183 cm)	185 lb (84 kg)	September 8, 1952 (aged 23)	(United States) Harvard Crimson
17	F	Bob Dobek	6 ft 0 in (183 cm)	185 lb (84 kg)	October 4, 1952 (aged 23)	(United States) San Diego Mariners
18	F	Doug Ross	5 ft 9 in (175 cm)	170 lb (77 kg)	October 9, 1951 (aged 24)	(United States) Bowling Green Falcons
21	F	Dan Bolduc	5 ft 9 in (175 cm)	190 lb (86 kg)	April 6, 1953 (aged 22)	(United States) Harvard Crimson
23	D	Dick Lamby	6 ft 1 in (185 cm)	203 lb (92 kg)	May 3, 1955 (aged 20)	(United States) Salem State Vikings
24	D	Jeffrey Hymanson	6 ft 2 in (188 cm)	194 lb (88 kg)	March 11, 1954 (aged 21)	(United States) Albuquerque Chaparrals
30	G	Jim Warden	6 ft 3 in (191 cm)	190 lb (86 kg)	June 22, 1954 (aged 21)	(United States) Michigan Tech Huskies

== West Germany ==
Head coach: Xaver Unsinn

No.	Pos.	Name	Height	Weight	Birthdate	Team
1	G	Erich Weishaupt	5 ft 9 in (175 cm)	154 lb (70 kg)	March 16, 1952 (aged 23)	(Germany) Berliner SC
2	D	Rudolf Thanner	5 ft 11 in (180 cm)	172 lb (78 kg)	August 20, 1944 (aged 31)	(Germany) EV Füssen
3	D	Josef Völk	5 ft 9 in (175 cm)	163 lb (74 kg)	December 3, 1948 (aged 27)	(Germany) EV Füssen
4	D	Udo Kießling	5 ft 11 in (180 cm)	185 lb (84 kg)	May 21, 1955 (aged 20)	(Germany) EV Rosenheim
6	D	Stefan Metz	5 ft 9 in (175 cm)	154 lb (70 kg)	October 15, 1951 (aged 24)	(Germany) Berliner SC
7	D	Klaus Auhuber	6 ft 1 in (185 cm)	196 lb (89 kg)	October 18, 1951 (aged 24)	(Germany) EV Landshut
8	D/F	Rainer Philipp	6 ft 0 in (183 cm)	194 lb (88 kg)	March 8, 1950 (aged 25)	(Germany) VfL Bad Nauheim
9	F	Lorenz Funk	6 ft 2 in (188 cm)	198 lb (90 kg)	March 17, 1947 (aged 28)	(Germany) Berliner SC
10	D	Wolfgang Boos	5 ft 9 in (175 cm)	165 lb (75 kg)	January 13, 1946 (aged 30)	(Germany) Düsseldorfer EG
11	F	Ernst Köpf	5 ft 10 in (178 cm)	179 lb (81 kg)	February 10, 1940 (aged 35)	(Germany) Berliner SC
12	F	Ferenc Vozar	6 ft 0 in (183 cm)	183 lb (83 kg)	April 19, 1945 (aged 30)	(Germany) Berliner SC
13	F	Walter Köberle	5 ft 8 in (173 cm)	163 lb (74 kg)	January 13, 1949 (aged 27)	(Germany) Düsseldorfer EG
14	F	Erich Kühnhackl	6 ft 5 in (196 cm)	214 lb (97 kg)	October 17, 1950 (aged 25)	(Germany) EV Landshut
15	F	Alois Schloder (C)	6 ft 0 in (183 cm)	181 lb (82 kg)	August 11, 1947 (aged 28)	(Germany) EV Landshut
16	F	Martin Hinterstocker	5 ft 7 in (170 cm)	165 lb (75 kg)	July 28, 1954 (aged 21)	(Germany) Berliner SC
18	F	Franz Reindl	5 ft 11 in (180 cm)	174 lb (79 kg)	November 24, 1954 (aged 21)	(Germany) SC Riessersee
19	D	Ignaz Berndaner	5 ft 9 in (175 cm)	174 lb (79 kg)	July 4, 1954 (aged 21)	(Germany) SC Riessersee
23	G	Anton Kehle	5 ft 9 in (175 cm)	176 lb (80 kg)	November 8, 1947 (aged 28)	(Germany) EV Füssen

== Yugoslavia ==
No.	Pos.	Name	Height	Weight	Birthdate	Team
-	G	Janez Albreht	5 ft 9 in (175 cm)	159 lb (72 kg)	February 9, 1940 (aged 36)	N/A
-	F/D	Božidar Beravs	5 ft 9 in (175 cm)	163 lb (74 kg)	December 24, 1949 (aged 26)	N/A
-	F	Miroslav Gojanović	5 ft 9 in (175 cm)	157 lb (71 kg)	April 20, 1949 (aged 26)	N/A
-	G	Edo Hafner	5 ft 9 in (175 cm)	185 lb (84 kg)	January 9, 1955 (aged 21)	N/A
-	F	Gorazd Hiti	6 ft 2 in (188 cm)	201 lb (91 kg)	April 6, 1947 (aged 28)	N/A
-	D	Bogdan Jakopič	-	-	January 18, 1948 (aged 28)	N/A
-	F	Ignac Kavec	-	-	February 20, 1953 (aged 22)	N/A
-	D	Bojan Kumar	6 ft 1 in (185 cm)	190 lb (86 kg)	August 3, 1950 (aged 25)	(Socialist Federal Republic of Yugoslavia) Olimpija Ljubljana
-	D	Miroslav Lap	-	-	September 8, 1950 (aged 25)	(Socialist Federal Republic of Yugoslavia) Olimpija Ljubljana
-	F	Tomaž Lepša	5 ft 11 in (180 cm)	181 lb (82 kg)	June 11, 1955 (aged 20)	N/A
-	F	Janez Petač	-	-	March 6, 1949 (aged 26)	N/A
-	F	Silvo Poljanšek	5 ft 10 in (178 cm)	165 lb (75 kg)	December 25, 1951 (aged 24)	N/A
-	F	Janez Puterle	5 ft 9 in (175 cm)	161 lb (73 kg)	February 21, 1952 (aged 23)	N/A
-	D	Drago Savić	6 ft 1 in (185 cm)	183 lb (83 kg)	May 4, 1949 (aged 26)	N/A
-	D	Ivan Ščap	5 ft 10 in (178 cm)	172 lb (78 kg)	December 3, 1955 (aged 20)	N/A
-	F	Roman Smolej	5 ft 9 in (175 cm)	172 lb (78 kg)	September 6, 1946 (aged 29)	N/A
-	F	Franci Žbontar	5 ft 10 in (178 cm)	172 lb (78 kg)	June 12, 1952 (aged 23)	N/A
-	G	Marjan Žbontar	-	-	March 24, 1954 (aged 21)	N/A

== Sources ==
- Duplacey, James (1998). Total Hockey: The official encyclopedia of the National Hockey League. Total Sports. ISBN 0-8362-7114-9.
- Podnieks, Andrew (2010). IIHF Media Guide & Record Book 2011. Moydart Pres.
- Hockey Hall Of Fame page on the 1976 Olympics
- Wallechinsky, David (1988). The Complete Book of the Olympics. Penguin Books. pp. 614. ISBN 0-14-010771-1.
- Jeux Olympiques 1976
