= Slovenian Hockey Hall of Fame =

The Slovenian Hockey Hall of Fame (Slovene: Slovenski hokejski hram slavnih) honors the contributions that individuals have made to the sport of hockey in Slovenia. It has opened in 2007, on the 80th anniversary of ice-hockey in Slovenia and 15th anniversary of Slovenia national ice hockey team, by the Ice Hockey Federation of Slovenia. In November 2012 11 new members were added as class of 2012 and 23 as class of 2008.

== Members ==
=== 2007 ===
- Ernest Aljančič sr.
- Jože Kovač
- Emil Ažman
- Erik Krisch
- Slavko Ažman
- Srdan Kuret
- Igor Beribak
- Franc Lešnjak
- Mustafa Bešić
- Dominik Lomovšek
- Andrej Brodnik
- Matko Medja
- Vasilij Cerar
- Janez Mlakar
- Boris Čebulj
- Drago Mlinarec
- Matevž Čemažar
- Murajica Pajič
- Hans Dobida
- Silvo Poljanšek
- Anton Dremelj
- Janko Popovič
- Jan Ake Edvinsson
- Cveto Pretnar
- Stane Eržen
- Ludvik Ravnik
- René Fasel
- Viktor Ravnik
- Albin Felc
- Andrej Razinger
- Eldar Gadžijev
- Drago Savič
- Tone Gale
- Matjaž Sekelj
- Jože Gogala
- Štefan Seme
- Marjan Gorenc
- Franc Smolej
- Edo Hafner
- Marko Smolej
- Gorazd Hiti
- Rudi Hiti
- Roman Smolej
- Dragan Stanisavljevič
- Bogo Jan
- Andrej Stare
- Ivo Jan, Sr.
- Nebojša Stojakovič
- Milko Janežič
- Lado Šimnic
- Marjan Jelovčan
- Zvone Šuvak
- Brane Jeršin
- Toni Tišlar
- Vlado Jug
- Viktor Tišlar
- Ingac Kovač
- Ciril Vister
- Rudi Knez
- Matjaž Žargi

=== 2008 ===
- Božidar Beravs
- Tomaž Bratina
- Drago Horvat
- Peter Klemenc
- Sašo Košir
- Tomaž Košir
- Mirko Lap
- Tomaž Lepša
- Blaž Lomovšek
- Janez Puterle
- Joža Razingar
- Ivan Ščap
- Andrej Vidmar
- Franci Žbontar
- Roman Iskra
- Zoran Rozman
- Igor Zaletel
- Bogdan Jakopič
- Gabrijel Javor
- Bojan Kavčič
- Miloš Sluga
- Andrej Verlič
- Zlatko Pavlica

=== 2012 ===
- Elvis Bešlagič
- Robert Ciglenečki
- Dejan Kontrec
- Tomaž Vnuk
- Bojan Zajc
- Nik Zupančič
- Luka Žagar
- Zoran Pahor
- Marko Popovič
- Žarko Bundala
- Franc Ferjanič

== Sources ==
- News on Slovenian national TV Website (in Slovene)
- News about class of 2012 (in Slovene)
- News about class of 2008 (in Slovene)
