= Yugoslavia at the 1976 Winter Olympics =

- Flag of SFR Yugoslavia
- IOC code: YUG
- NOC: Yugoslav Olympic Committee

in Innsbruck
- Competitors: 28 (27 men, 1 woman) in 4 sports
- Medals: Gold 0 Silver 0 Bronze 0 Total 0

Winter Olympics appearances (overview)
- 1924; 1928; 1932; 1936; 1948; 1952; 1956; 1960; 1964; 1968; 1972; 1976; 1980; 1984; 1988; 1992; 1994; 1998; 2002

Other related appearances
- Croatia (1992–); Slovenia (1992–); Bosnia and Herzegovina (1994–); North Macedonia (1998–); Serbia and Montenegro (1998–2006); Montenegro (2010–); Serbia (2010–); Kosovo (2018–)

Athletes from the Socialist Federal Republic of Yugoslavia competed at the 1976 Winter Olympics in Innsbruck, Austria.

== Alpine skiing ==
Men

Athlete	Event	Race 1		Race 2		Total	
Athlete	Event	Time	Rank	Time	Rank	Time	Rank
Ajdin Pašović	Downhill					1:54.57	46
Andrej Koželj	Downhill					1:52.75	37
Miran Gašperšič	Giant Slalom	DNF	–	–	–	DNF	–
Ajdin Pašović	Giant Slalom	1:54.82	46	DNF	–	DNF	–
Andrej Koželj	Giant Slalom	1:54.43	42	1:56.05	35	3:50.48	35
Bojan Križaj	Giant Slalom	1:49.08	25	1:46.82	16	3:35.90	18
Bojan Križaj	Slalom	DNF	–	–	–	DNF	–
Miran Gašperšič	Slalom	DNF	–	–	–	DNF	–
Ajdin Pašović	Slalom	DNF	–	–	–	DNF	–
Andrej Koželj	Slalom	1:09.50	37	1:14:16	32	2:23.66	31

== Cross-country skiing ==
Men

Event	Athlete	Race	
Event	Athlete	Time	Rank
15 km	Maksi Jelenc	49:35.35	57
30 km	Maksi Jelenc	1'44:20.25	60
50 km	Maksi Jelenc	3'05:05.94	44

Women

Event	Athlete	Race	
Event	Athlete	Time	Rank
5 km	Milena Kordež	18:36.23	37
10 km	Milena Kordež	35:15.54	39

== Ice hockey ==
=== First round ===
Winners (in bold) entered the Medal Round. Other teams played a consolation round for 7th-12th places.

Team 1	Score	Team 2
**United States**	8–4	Yugoslavia

=== Consolation Round ===
Rank		Pld	W	L	T	GF	GA	Pts
7	Romania	5	4	1	0	23	15	8
8	Austria	5	3	2	0	18	14	6
9	Japan	5	3	2	0	20	18	6
10	Yugoslavia	5	3	2	0	22	19	6
11	Switzerland	5	2	3	0	24	22	4
12	Bulgaria	5	0	5	0	19	38	0

- Yugoslavia 6-4 Switzerland
- Yugoslavia 4-3 Romania
- Yugoslavia 8-5 Bulgaria
- Japan 4-3 Yugoslavia
- Austria 3-1 Yugoslavia

**Contestants**; Marjan Žbontar; Janez Albreht; Miroslav Lap; Drago Savić; Božidar Beravs; Bojan Kumar; Ivan Ščap; Bogdan Jakopič; Miroslav Gojanović; Eduard Hafner; Tomaž Lepša; Roman Smolej; Ignac Kavec; Franci Žbontar; Silvo Poljanšek; Janez Petač; Janez Puterle; Gorazd Hiti

== Ski jumping ==
Athlete	Event	Jump 1		Jump 2		Total	
Athlete	Event	Distance	Points	Distance	Points	Points	Rank
Janez Demšar	Normal hill	72.5	98.3	74.5	101.5	199.8	47
Bogdan Norčič	Normal hill	74.5	102.5	75.0	103.3	205.8	38
Ivo Zupan	Normal hill	75.0	103.8	72.0	98.5	202.3	46
Branko Dolhar	Normal hill	75.5	104.1	74.5	100.0	204.1	42
Ivo Zupan	Large hill	68.0	52.2	73.0	67.2	119.4	54
Branko Dolhar	Large hill	83.0	85.2	77.5	75.0	160.2	42
Janez Demšar	Large hill	83.0	86.7	74.0	71.1	157.8	43
Bogdan Norčič	Large hill	85.0	90.5	82.5	87.5	178.0	28
