= Yugoslavia at the 1972 Winter Olympics =

- Flag of SFR Yugoslavia
- IOC code: YUG
- NOC: Yugoslav Olympic Committee

in Sapporo
- Competitors: 26 (men) in 4 sports
- Flag bearer: Viktor Ravnik
- Medals: Gold 0 Silver 0 Bronze 0 Total 0

Winter Olympics appearances (overview)
- 1924; 1928; 1932; 1936; 1948; 1952; 1956; 1960; 1964; 1968; 1972; 1976; 1980; 1984; 1988; 1992; 1994; 1998; 2002

Other related appearances
- Croatia (1992–); Slovenia (1992–); Bosnia and Herzegovina (1994–); North Macedonia (1998–); Serbia and Montenegro (1998–2006); Montenegro (2010–); Serbia (2010–); Kosovo (2018–)

Athletes from the Socialist Federal Republic of Yugoslavia competed at the 1972 Winter Olympics in Sapporo, Japan.

== Alpine skiing ==
Men

Athlete	Event	Race 1		Race 2		Total	
Athlete	Event	Time	Rank	Time	Rank	Time	Rank
Marko Kavčič	Giant Slalom	1:39.01	35	1:46.08	34	3:25.09	31

Men's slalom

Athlete	Classification		Final					
Athlete	Time	Rank	Time 1	Rank	Time 2	Rank	Total	Rank
Marko Kavčič	1:44.53	3	DSQ	–	–	–	DSQ	–

== Ice hockey ==
=== First round ===
Winners (in bold) entered the Medal Round. Other teams played a consolation round for 7th-11th places.

Team 1	Score	Team 2
**Sweden**	8–1	Yugoslavia

=== Consolation Round ===
Rank	Team	Pld	W	L	T	GF	GA	Pts
**7**	West Germany	4	3	1	0	22	10	**6**
**8**	Norway	4	3	1	0	16	14	**6**
**9**	Japan	4	2	1	1	17	16	**5**
**10**	Switzerland	4	0	2	2	9	16	**2**
**11**	Yugoslavia	4	0	3	1	9	17	**1**

- Norway 5-2 Yugoslavia
- West Germany 6-2 Yugoslavia
- Japan 3-2 Yugoslavia
- Switzerland 3-3 Yugoslavia

**Contestants**; Anton Jože Gale; Rudi Knez; Bogo Jan; Viktor Ravnik; Ivo Ratej; Drago Savić; Ivo Jan; Franci Žbontar; Rudi Hiti; Boris Renaud; Janez Puterle; Albin Felc; Roman Smolej; Silvo Poljanšek; Viktor Tišler; Slavko Beravs; Bojan Kumar; Božidar Beravs; Gorazd Hiti; Štefan Seme

== Nordic combined ==
Events:

- normal hill ski jumping (Three jumps, best two counted and shown here.)
- 15 km cross-country skiing

Athlete	Event	Ski Jumping				Cross-country			Total	
Athlete	Event	Distance 1	Distance 2	Points	Rank	Time	Points	Rank	Points	Rank
Janez Gorjanc	Individual	66.5	68.0	155.8	28	52:40.1	181.720	31	337.520	32

== Ski jumping ==
Athlete	Event	Jump 1		Jump 2		Total	
Athlete	Event	Distance	Points	Distance	Points	Points	Rank
Drago Pudgar	Normal hill	73.5	97.8	73.5	99.3	197.1	35
Marjan Mesec	Normal hill	74.0	100.1	71.0	95.3	195.4	37
Peter Štefančić	Normal hill	77.0	107.9	77.5	110.2	218.1	10
Danilo Pudgar	Normal hill	79.5	112.4	68.5	92.3	204.7	27
Peter Štefančić	Large hill	79.0	67.6	84.0	77.6	145.2	48
Marjan Mesec	Large hill	83.0	78.7	84.5	83.8	162.5	37
Drago Pudgar	Large hill	91.5	95.6	84.0	84.1	179.7	23
Danilo Pudgar	Large hill	92.5	98.5	97.5	107.5	206.0	8
