= Yugoslavia at the 1984 Winter Olympics =

- Flag of SFR Yugoslavia
- IOC code: YUG
- NOC: Yugoslav Olympic Committee

in Sarajevo
- Competitors: 72 (59 men, 13 women) in 10 sports
- Flag bearer: Jure Franko (alpine skiing)
- Medals Ranked 14th: Gold 0 Silver 1 Bronze 0 Total 1

Winter Olympics appearances (overview)
- 1924; 1928; 1932; 1936; 1948; 1952; 1956; 1960; 1964; 1968; 1972; 1976; 1980; 1984; 1988; 1992; 1994; 1998; 2002

Other related appearances
- Croatia (1992–pres.); Slovenia (1992–pres.); Bosnia and Herzegovina (1994–pres.); North Macedonia (1998–pres.); Serbia and Montenegro (1998–2006); Montenegro (2010–pres.); Serbia (2010–pres.); Kosovo (2018–pres.)

The Socialist Federal Republic of Yugoslavia was the host nation for the 1984 Winter Olympics in Sarajevo. Prior to these Games, Yugoslavia had never won a medal at the Winter Games, but Jure Franko won a silver medal in the men's giant slalom to become a national hero.

== Medalists ==
Medal	Name	Sport	Event	Date
Silver	Jure Franko	Alpine Skiing	Men's giant slalom	14 February

== Alpine skiing ==
Men

Athlete	Event	Final					
Athlete	Event	Run 1	Rank	Run 2	Rank	Total	Rank
Tomaž Jemc	Downhill	—N/a				1:49.68	30
Janez Pleteršek	Downhill	—N/a				1:48.97	27
Grega Benedik	Giant slalom	Did not finish					
Jure Franko	Giant slalom	1:21.15	4	1:20.26	1	2:41.41	2nd place, silver medalist(s)
Jure Franko	Slalom	Did not finish					
Bojan Križaj	Giant slalom	1:22.18	12	1:21.30	9	2:43.48	9
Bojan Križaj	Slalom	52.98	10	48.53	5	1:41.51	7
Boris Strel	Giant slalom	1:21.23	5	1:21.13	6	2:42.36	5
Tomaž Cerkovnik	Slalom	53.39	15	49.58	11	1:42.97	11
Jože Kuralt	Slalom	53.52	19	51.33	13	1:44.85	13

Women

Athlete	Event	Final					
Athlete	Event	Run 1	Rank	Run 2	Rank	Total	Rank
Andreja Leskovšek	Giant slalom	1:11.20	16	1:13.41	17	2:24.61	16
Andreja Leskovšek	Slalom	52.00	21	Disqualified			
Veronika Šarec	Giant slalom	1:11.71	23	1:13.30	15	2:25.01	20
Mateja Svet	Giant slalom	1:11.88	24	1:14.34	26	2:26.22	23
Mateja Svet	Slalom	51.12	19	49.73	15	1:40.85	15
Nuša Tome	Giant slalom	1:12.18	32	1:14.03	23	2:26.21	22
Nuša Tome	Slalom	50.69	17	Did not finish			
Anja Zavadlav	Slalom	Did not finish					

== Biathlon ==
Athlete	Event	Final		
Athlete	Event	Time	Misses	Rank
Andrej Lanišek	Individual	1:24:23.1	6	41
Andrej Lanišek	Sprint	36:16.0	5	49
Jure Velepec	Individual	1:27:05.8	1	17
Marjan Vidmar	Individual	1:26:32.1	8	46
Marjan Vidmar	Sprint	37:08.1	3	54
Tomislav Lopatić	Sprint	40:18.2	9	57
Andrej Lanišek; Jure Velepec; Zoran Ćosić; Franjo Jakovac	Relay	1:54:13.8	3+15	17

== Bobsleigh ==
Athlete	Event	Run 1		Run 2		Run 3		Run 4		Total	
Athlete	Event	Time	Rank	Time	Rank	Time	Rank	Time	Rank	Time	Rank
Zdravko Stojnić; Siniša Tubić	Two-man	53.76	22	54.09	25	52.82	19	53.35	23	3:34.02	22
Boris Rađenović; Nikola Korica	Two-man	53.85	23	54.01	24	53.05	21	53.22	21	3:34.13	24
Zdravko Stojnić; Mario Franjić; Siniša Tubić; Nikola Korica	Four-man	51.32	18	51.90	21	51.65	19	51.61	16	3:26.48	19
Nenad Prodanović; Ognjen Sokolović; Zoran Sokolović; Borislav Vujadinović	Four-man	51.62	23	51.96	22	52.35	23	52.38	24	3:28.31	23

== Cross-country skiing ==
Men

Athlete	Event	Race	
Athlete	Event	Time	Rank
Ivo Čarman	15 km	45:04.0	35
Ivo Čarman	30 km	1:38:09.6	40
Dušan Ðuričić	15 km	45:24.6	40
Dušan Ðuričić	30 km	1:39:04.6	44
Dušan Ðuričić	50 km	2:28:23.4	32
Sašo Grajf	15 km	46:21.1	48
Jože Klemenčić	15 km	Disqualified	
Jože Klemenčić	30 km	1:37:40.1	38
Jože Klemenčić	50 km	2:35:22.4	42
Janež Kršinar	30 km	1:40:45.5	51
Janež Kršinar	50 km	2:30:16.2	36
Ivo Čarman; Jože Klemenčić; Janež Kršinar; Dušan Đurišič	4x10 km relay	2:04:42.8	12

Women

Athlete	Event	Race	
Athlete	Event	Time	Rank
Jana Mlakar	5 km	18:54.1	34
Jana Mlakar	10 km	34:52.2	30
Metka Munih	5 km	20:12.0	43
Metka Munih	10 km	37:18.4	43
Metka Munih	20 km	1:13:35.8	38
Tatjana Smolnikar	5 km	20:21.8	45
Tatjana Smolnikar	10 km	37:58.1	44
Andreja Smrekar	5 km	19:41.7	41
Andreja Smrekar	10 km	36:10.4	41
Jana Mlakar; Andreja Smrekar; Tatjana Smolnikar; Metka Munih	4x5 km relay	1:02:28.4	10

== Figure skating ==
Men

Athlete	CF	SP	FS	TFP	Rank
Miljan Begovic	17	22	21	40.0	21

Women

Athlete	CF	SP	FS	TFP	Rank
Sanda Dubravčić	8	9	9	17.4	10

== Ice hockey ==
=== Group A ===
Top two teams (shaded ones) advanced to the medal round.

Team	Pld	W	L	T	GF	GA	Pts
Soviet Union	5	5	0	0	42	5	10
Sweden	5	3	1	1	34	15	7
West Germany	5	3	1	1	27	17	7
Poland	5	1	4	0	16	37	2
Italy	5	1	4	0	15	31	2
Yugoslavia	5	1	4	0	8	37	2

- West Germany 8-1 Yugoslavia
- Sweden 11-0 Yugoslavia
- USSR 9-1 Yugoslavia
- Yugoslavia 5-1 Italy
- Poland 8-1 Yugoslavia

Roster

- Igor Beribak
- Mustafa Bešić
- Dejan Burnik
- Marjan Gorenc
- Edo Hafner
- Gorazd Hiti
- Drago Horvat
- Peter Klemenc
- Jože Kovač
- Vojko Lajovec
- Tomaž Lepša
- Blaž Lomovšek
- Drago Mlinarec
- Murajica Pajić
- Cveto Pretnar
- Bojan Razpet
- Ivan Ščap
- Matjaž Sekelj
- Zvone Šuvak
- Andrzej Vidmar
- Domine Lomovšek

== Luge ==
Men

Athlete	Run 1		Run 2		Run 3		Run 4		Total	
Athlete	Time	Rank	Time	Rank	Time	Rank	Time	Rank	Time	Rank
Suad Karajica	54.075	32	48.293	27	47.797	23	48.123	25	3:18.288	28
Dušan Dragojević	47.480	18	47.332	17	47.465	18	47.338	18	3:09.615	16

Women

Athlete	Run 1		Run 2		Run 3		Run 4		Total	
Athlete	Time	Rank	Time	Rank	Time	Rank	Time	Rank	Time	Rank
Dajana Karajica	43.901	21	43.250	16	42.890	16	42.619	16	2:52.660	17

== Nordic combined ==
Events:

- normal hill ski jumping (Three jumps, best two counted and shown here.)
- 15 km cross-country skiing

Athlete	Event	Ski Jumping				Cross-country			Total	
Athlete	Event	Distance 1	Distance 2	Points	Rank	Time	Points	Rank	Points	Rank
Robert Kaštrun	Individual	83.0	86.0	200.7	11	56:09.4	133.390	28	334.090	27

== Ski jumping ==
Athlete	Event	Jump 1		Jump 2		Total	
Athlete	Event	Distance	Points	Distance	Points	Points	Rank
Primož Ulaga	Normal hill	59.0	35.4	82.5	95.5	130.9	57
Bojan Globočnik	Normal hill	80.0	91.5	73.0	74.8	166.3	40
Miran Tepeš	Normal hill	81.0	92.6	80.0	90.5	183.1	27
Vasja Bajc	Normal hill	83.0	94.8	82.0	95.2	190.0	17
Miran Tepeš	Large hill	77.0	47.0	95.0	83.7	130.7	45
Primož Ulaga	Large hill	99.0	89.3	103.0	95.9	185.2	13
Tomaž Dolar	Large hill	101.5	93.8	100.5	91.9	185.7	11
Vasja Bajc	Large hill	103.5	99.6	94.0	81.8	181.4	15

== Speed skating ==
Men

Athlete	Event	Final	
Athlete	Event	Time	Rank
Behudin Merdović	500 m	46.34	41
Behudin Merdović	1000 m	1:33.33	43
Behudin Merdović	1500 m	2:19.25	40
Behudin Merdović	5000 m	Disqualified	
Nenad Žvanut	500 m	42.55	39
Nenad Žvanut	1000 m	1:26.63	41

Women

Athlete	Event	Final	
Athlete	Event	Time	Rank
Bibija Kerla	500 m	58.23	32
Bibija Kerla	1000 m	1:51.06	36
Bibija Kerla	1500 m	2:46.32	32
Bibija Kerla	3000 m	5:37.67	26
Dubravka Vukušić	500 m	51.99	31
Dubravka Vukušić	1000 m	2:03.02	38
Dubravka Vukušić	1500 m	2:42.12	31
