= Switzerland at the 1976 Winter Olympics =

- IOC code: SUI
- NOC: Swiss Olympic Association
- Website: www.swissolympic.ch (in German and French)

in Innsbruck
- Competitors: 59 (52 men, 7 women) in 9 sports
- Flag bearer: Werner Carmichel (bobsleigh)
- Medals Ranked 8th: Gold 1 Silver 3 Bronze 1 Total 5

Winter Olympics appearances (overview)
- 1924; 1928; 1932; 1936; 1948; 1952; 1956; 1960; 1964; 1968; 1972; 1976; 1980; 1984; 1988; 1992; 1994; 1998; 2002; 2006; 2010; 2014; 2018; 2022; 2026

Switzerland competed at the 1976 Winter Olympics in Innsbruck, Austria.

== Medalists ==
Medal	Name	Sport	Event
Gold	Heini Hemmi	Alpine skiing	Men's giant slalom
Silver	Bernhard Russi	Alpine skiing	Men's downhill
Silver	Ernst Good	Alpine skiing	Men's giant slalom
Silver	Erich Schärer; Ulrich Bächli; Rudolf Marti; Josef Benz	Bobsleigh	Four-man
Bronze	Erich Schärer; Josef Benz	Bobsleigh	Two-man

== Alpine skiing ==
Men

Athlete	Event	Race 1		Race 2		Total	
Athlete	Event	Time	Rank	Time	Rank	Time	Rank
René Berthod	Downhill					1:47.89	12
Walter Tresch	Downhill					1:47.29	7
Philippe Roux	Downhill					1:46.29	4
Bernhard Russi	Downhill					1:46.06	2nd place, silver medalist(s)
Walter Tresch	Giant Slalom	1:49.26	27	DNF	–	DNF	–
Engelhard Pargätzi	Giant Slalom	1:46.16	6	1:42.60	4	3:28.76	6
Heini Hemmi	Giant Slalom	1:45.41	3	1:41.56	2	3:26.97	1st place, gold medalist(s)
Ernst Good	Giant Slalom	1:44.60	2	1:42.57	3	3:27.17	2nd place, silver medalist(s)
Ernst Good	Slalom	DNF	–	–	–	DNF	–
Heini Hemmi	Slalom	DNF	–	–	–	DNF	–
Peter Lüscher	Slalom	1:02.76	13	1:05.34	7	2:08.10	8
Walter Tresch	Slalom	1:01.34	6	1:03.92	3	2:05.26	4

Women

Athlete	Event	Race 1		Race 2		Total	
Athlete	Event	Time	Rank	Time	Rank	Time	Rank
Doris de Agostini	Downhill					1:50.46	18
Marlies Oberholzer	Downhill					1:48.68	8
Bernadette Zurbriggen	Downhill					1:48.62	7
Bernadette Zurbriggen	Giant Slalom					DNF	–
Marlies Oberholzer	Giant Slalom					1:34.09	26
Marie-Theres Nadig	Giant Slalom					1:30.44	5
Lise-Marie Morerod	Giant Slalom					1:30.40	4
Marie-Theres Nadig	Slalom	DNF	–	–	–	DNF	–
Lise-Marie Morerod	Slalom	DNF	–	–	–	DNF	–
Bernadette Zurbriggen	Slalom	49.78	17	47.40	11	1:37.18	12

== Biathlon ==
Men

Event	Athlete	Time	Penalties	Adjusted time ^{1}	Rank
20 km	Christian Danuser	1'20:16.43	7	1'27:16.43	40
20 km	Albert Mächler	1'17:28.66	6	1'23:28.66	25
20 km	Hansruedi Süssli	1'16:53.73	3	1'19:53.73	14

^{1} One minute added per close miss (a hit in the outer ring), two minutes added per complete miss.

== Bobsleigh ==
Sled	Athletes	Event	Run 1		Run 2		Run 3		Run 4		Total	
Sled	Athletes	Event	Time	Rank	Time	Rank	Time	Rank	Time	Rank	Time	Rank
SUI-1	Erich Schärer; Sepp Benz	Two-man	56.43	5	56.53	5	56.33	3	56.41	3	3:45.70	3rd place, bronze medalist(s)
SUI-2	Fritz Lüdi; Thomas Hagen	Two-man	56.95	9	57.32	10	57.35	10	57.48	11	3:49.10	10

Sled	Athletes	Event	Run 1		Run 2		Run 3		Run 4		Total	
Sled	Athletes	Event	Time	Rank	Time	Rank	Time	Rank	Time	Rank	Time	Rank
SUI-1	Fritz Lüdi; Thomas Hagen; Rudolf Schmid; Karl Häseli	Four-man	55.29	7	55.33	6	56.37	9	57.05	9	3:44.04	9
SUI-2	Erich Schärer; Ueli Bächli; Ruedi Marti; Sepp Benz	Four-man	54.96	5	54.81	2	55.28	1	55.84	1	3:40.89	2nd place, silver medalist(s)

== Cross-country skiing ==
Men

Event	Athlete	Race	
Event	Athlete	Time	Rank
15 km	Alfred Kälin	47:05.39	27
15 km	Eduard Hauser	46:29.14	17
15 km	Franz Renggli	45:53.49	12
15 km	Albert Giger	45:47.07	11
30 km	Hansueli Kreuzer	1'39:58.44	50
30 km	Alfred Kälin	1'36:09.97	29
30 km	Eduard Hauser	1'35:50.29	25
30 km	Albert Giger	1'32:17.71	7
50 km	Christian Pfeuti	2'49:50.90	32
50 km	Venanz Egger	2'48:30.70	31
50 km	Heinz Gähler	2'45:51.64	20
50 km	Franz Renggli	2'45:25.24	18

Men's 4 × 10 km relay

Athletes	Race	
Athletes	Time	Rank
Franz Renggli; Eduard Hauser; Heinz Gähler; Alfred Kälin	2'11:28.53	5

== Figure skating ==
Women

Athlete	CF	SP	FS	Points	Places	Rank
Danielle Rieder	16	–	–	–	DNF	–

Pairs

Athletes	SP	FS	Points	Places	Rank
Karin Künzle; Christian Künzle	6	7	128.97	64	7

== Ice hockey ==
=== First round ===
Winners (in bold) entered the Medal Round. Other teams played a consolation round for 7th-12th places.

Team 1	Score	Team 2
**West Germany**	5–1	Switzerland

=== Consolation Round ===
Rank		Pld	W	L	T	GF	GA	Pts
7	Romania	5	4	1	0	23	15	8
8	Austria	5	3	2	0	18	14	6
9	Japan	5	3	2	0	20	18	6
10	Yugoslavia	5	3	2	0	22	19	6
11	Switzerland	5	2	3	0	24	22	4
12	Bulgaria	5	0	5	0	19	38	0

- Yugoslavia 6-4 Switzerland
- Switzerland 8-3 Bulgaria
- Japan 6-4 Switzerland
- Austria 3-5 Switzerland
- Romania 4-3 Switzerland

**Contestants**; Alfio Molina; André Jorns; Charles Henzen; Andreas Meyer; Jakob Kölliker; Ueli Hofmann; Ernst Lüthi; Aldo Zenhäusern; Nando Mathieu; Bernhard Neininger; Anton Neininger; Renzo Holzer; Walter Dürst; Guy Dubois; Georg Mattli; Jürg Berger; Rolf Schiemer; Daniel Widmer

== Nordic combined ==
Events:

- normal hill ski jumping (Three jumps, best two counted and shown here.)
- 15 km cross-country skiing

Athlete	Event	Ski Jumping				Cross-country			Total	
Athlete	Event	Distance 1	Distance 2	Points	Rank	Time	Points	Rank	Points	Rank
Karl Lustenberger	Individual	72.5	74.5	202.5	10	52:57.52	175.60	27	378.10	19

== Ski jumping ==
Athlete	Event	Jump 1		Jump 2		Total	
Athlete	Event	Distance	Points	Distance	Points	Points	Rank
Robert Mösching	Normal hill	75.0	104.3	75.0	103.3	207.6	35
Hans Schmid	Normal hill	78.0	112.1	79.0	114.2	226.3	13
Walter Steiner	Normal hill	80.0	117.3	78.5	114.9	232.2	9
Ernst von Grünigen	Normal hill	80.5	119.1	80.5	119.6	238.7	5
Robert Mösching	Large hill	84.0	87.6	79.0	80.1	167.7	38
Ernst von Grünigen	Large hill	84.5	93.3	81.5	89.1	182.4	23
Hans Schmid	Large hill	86.5	95.6	83.0	90.7	186.3	20
Walter Steiner	Large hill	89.5	99.8	93.0	108.7	208.5	9

== Speed skating ==
Men

Event	Athlete	Race	
Event	Athlete	Time	Rank
1500 m	Franz Krienbühl	2:12.52	27
5000 m	Franz Krienbühl	7:53.11	17
10,000 m	Franz Krienbühl	15:36.43	8
