= Žbontar =

Žbontar is a surname. Notable people with the surname include:

- Franci Žbontar (born 1952), Yugoslav ice hockey player
- Marjan Žbontar (born 1954), Yugoslav ice hockey player, brother of Franci
- Miha Žbontar (born 1982), Slovene ice hockey player and coach
