= Neininger =

Neininger is a surname. Notable people with the surname include:

- Anton Neininger (born 1950), Swiss ice hockey player
- Bernhard Neininger (born 1955), Swiss professional ice hockey forward
