= Tišlar =

Tišlar is a Slovenian surname that corresponds to German Tischler. Notable people with the surname include:

- Toni Tišlar (born 1967), Slovenian ice hockey player
- Viktor Tišlar, Slovenian ice hockey player
