= Smolej =

Smolej is a Slovenian surname that may refer to

- Franc Smolej (ice hockey) (born 1940), Slovenian ice hockey player
- Franc Smolej (skier) (1908–?), Yugoslav Olympic cross-country skier
- Roman Smolej (born 1946), Yugoslav ice hockey player
- Uroš Smolej (born 1985), Slovenian football defender

== See also ==
- Smole
