= Hiti (surname) =

Hiti is a surname. Notable people with the surname include:

- Gorazd Hiti (born 1948), Slovene ice hockey player
- Rudi Hiti (born 1946), Slovene ice hockey player
