= Pretnar =

Pretnar is a Slovenian surname. Notable people with this name include:

- Igor Pretnar (1924 – 1977) Slovenian film director
- Cveto Pretnar (born 1957) Slovenian ice hockey player who represented Yugoslavia at the 1984 Winter Olympics
- Špela Pretnar (born 1973) Slovenian alpine skier who represented Slovenia at the 2002 Winter Olympics
- Klemen Pretnar (born 1986) Slovenian ice hockey player who represented Slovenia at the 2011 IIHF World Championship
