= Albreht =

Albreht is a surname of Slavic origin. Notable people with the surname include:

- Fran Albreht (1889–1963), Slovenian poet, editor, politician and partisan
- Janez Albreht (1925–2013), Slovenian actor
- Janez Albreht (ice hockey) (born 1940), Yugoslav and Slovenian ice hockey player
- Vera Albreht (1895–1971), Slovenian poet, writer, journalist, and translator
