= Petac =

Petac may refer to:

- Petac River
- Janez Petač (1949–2011), Slovene ice hockey player
