= Jan-Åke Edvinsson =

Swedish ice hockey administrator (1941–2022)

- Born: 13 September 1941; Kristianstad Municipality, Sweden
- Died: 6 December 2022 (aged 81); Stockholm, Sweden
- Known for: International Ice Hockey Federation and Swedish Ice Hockey Association general secretary
- Honors: IIHF Hall of Fame; Swedish Hockey Hall of Fame; German Ice Hockey Hall of Fame; Slovenian Hockey Hall of Fame

Jan-Åke Edvinsson (13 September 1941 – 6 December 2022) was a Swedish ice hockey administrator. He served as the International Ice Hockey Federation (IIHF) general secretary from 1986 to 2006, and held the same position with the Swedish Ice Hockey Association from 1976 to 1986. During this time with the IIHF, it grew from 34 to 64 competing nations at 29 international tournaments. He later worked as a technical delegate for the Winter Olympic Games. He was inducted into the builder category of the IIHF Hall of Fame, and was also inducted into the Swedish Hockey Hall of Fame, the German Ice Hockey Hall of Fame, and the Slovenian Hockey Hall of Fame.

== Early life ==
Jan-Åke Edvinsson was born on 13 September 1941, in Trolle Ljungby, in the Kristianstad Municipality, Sweden. He began working as an ice hockey administrator in 1972, as the finance manager for the Swedish Ice Hockey Association. He later served as general secretary of the Swedish Ice Hockey Association from 1976 to 1986. During his time with the Swedish Ice Hockey Association, he brought the association into the computer age to handle accounting and statistics.

== IIHF career ==
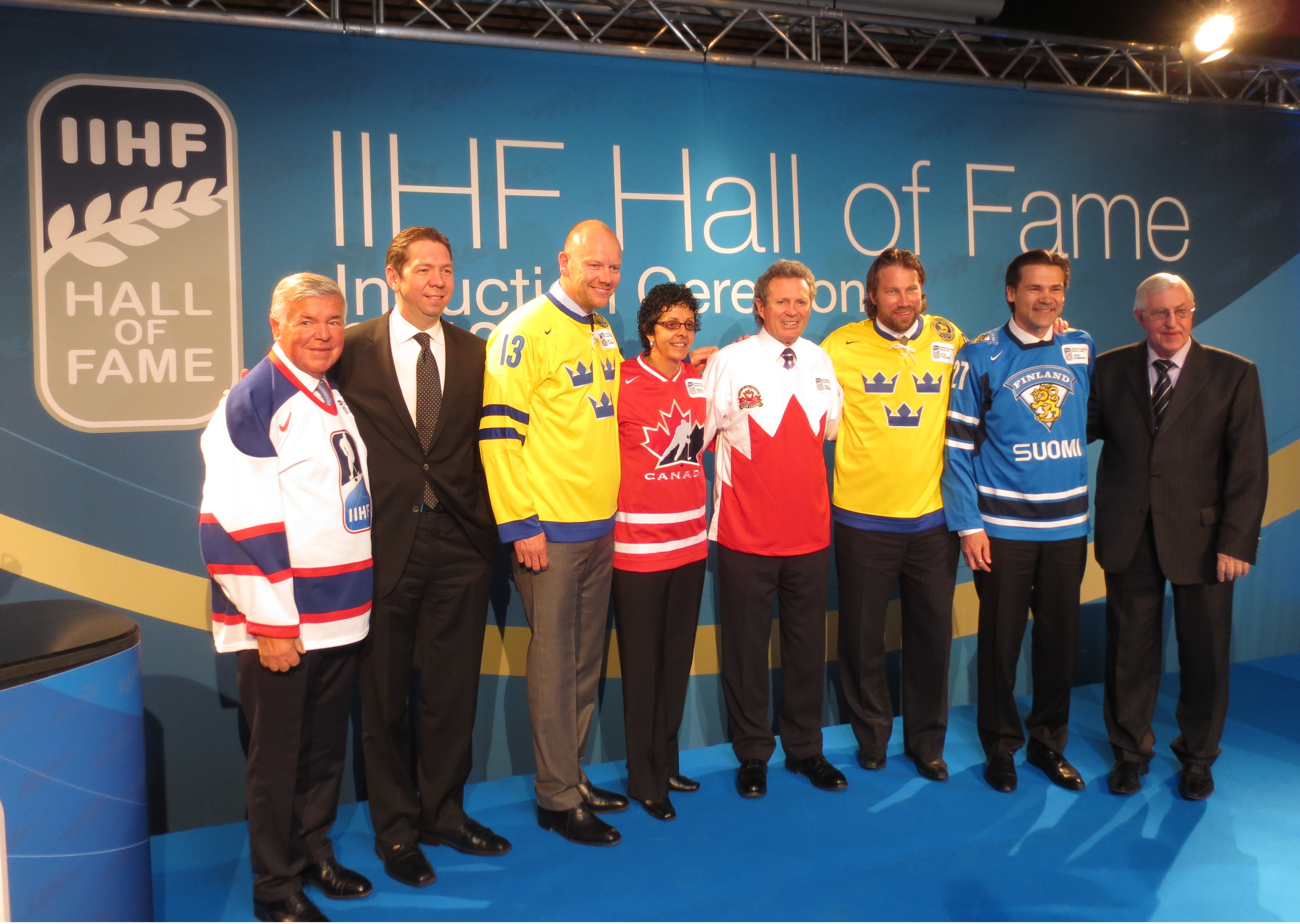
Edvinsson (far left) as he is inducted into the IIHF Hall of Fame in 2013.

Edvinsson served as general secretary of the International Ice Hockey Federation (IIHF) from 1986 to 2006, and oversaw the day-to-day operations. He worked for IIHF presidents Günther Sabetzki and René Fasel, and held the position longer than any other general secretary to date. During his tenure, the IIHF offices relocated from Vienna to Zürich in 1991, then into a new building in Zürich in 2002.

When Edvinsson began as general secretary, he administered six world championship programs, with a budget of 3.5 million Swiss francs. During his tenure, the IIHF expanded from four employees in 1986, to 23 people by 2006, all of whom were selected by Edvinsson from 13 different nations. He brought IIHF through a transition into the computer age for its data processing. He helped the IIHF grow from 34 to 64 nations competing in 29 international tournaments. Edvinsson was succeeded as secretary general of the IIHF by Horst Lichtner from Germany on 1 November 2006.

== Later life and honors ==
Edvinsson was a member of the Hockey Hall of Fame selection committee from June 2006 to June 2011. He was named as an International Sport Federations representative for the evaluation commission for the 2014 Winter Olympics. He also continued to work on various IIHF committees, including the historical committee and strategic consulting group, and served as the IIHF technical delegate for the 2010 Winter Olympics.

Edvinsson was made a life member of the IIHF in 2006. He also received the gold medal of merit from the Swedish Sports Confederation, in addition to a gold medal for lifetime achievement from the Swedish Ice Hockey Association. During the 2013 IIHF World Championship in Stockholm, he was inducted into the builder category of the IIHF Hall of Fame. Edvinsson was inducted into the Swedish Hockey Hall of Fame in August 2014, and was called "one of Sweden's most famous sports leaders". He was also inducted into the German Ice Hockey Hall of Fame, and the Slovenian Hockey Hall of Fame.

After retirement, Edvinsson continued to reside in Zürich with his wife before returning to Sweden. He died at age 81 on 6 December 2022, in Stockholm after a long illness.
