= Daniel Widmer =

Daniel Widmer may refer to:

- Daniel Widmer (ice hockey), Swiss ice hockey player
- Daniel Widmer (curler), Swiss curler
