= Ajdin Pašović =

Yugoslav alpine skier (born 1957)

Personal information
- Nationality: Yugoslav
- Born: 1 January 1957 (age 68); Pale, Bosnia and Herzegovina

Sport
- Sport: Alpine skiing

Ajdin Pašović (born 1 January 1957) is a Yugoslav alpine skier. He competed in three events at the 1976 Winter Olympics, where he ranked 46th in downhill skiing.
