= Andrej Razinger =

- Born: May 8, 1967 (age 57); Jesenice, Yugoslavia
- Height: 5 ft 9 in (175 cm)
- Weight: 194 lb (88 kg; 13 st 12 lb)
- Caught: right
- Played for: HK Acroni Jesenice; HK Kranjska Gora
- National team: Yugoslavia and Slovenia
- Playing career: 1983–2004

Andrej Razinger (born May 8, 1967) is a retired Slovenian professional ice hockey player.

== Career ==
=== Club career ===
In 1983, Razinger made his debut in the Yugoslav Ice Hockey League with HK Kranjska Gora. In 1986, he joined HK Acroni Jesenice, and played with them until he retired in 2004. He played in 601 games, scoring 270 goals, and adding 244 assists.

=== International career ===
He represented both Yugoslavia and Slovenia in international competitions. Razinger participated in a total of 9 IIHF World Championships, scoring 129 goals and adding 73 assists in 155 games.
