= Smole =

Smole is a Slovenian surname. Notable people with the surname include:

- Dominik Smole (1929–1992), Slovenian writer and playwright
- Janko Smole (1921–2010), Slovenian politician
- Jože Smole (born 1965), Yugoslav Olympic cyclist

== See also ==
- Smolej
