= Marian Kajzerek =

Polish ice hockey player

- Born: August 27, 1946 (age 78); Janów, Poland
- Height: 5 ft 7 in (170 cm)
- Weight: 163 lb (74 kg; 11 st 9 lb)
- Position: Centre
- Played for: Naprzód Janów
- National team: Poland
- NHL draft: Undrafted
- Playing career: ?–?

Marian Kajzerek (born August 27, 1946) is a former Polish ice hockey player. He played for the Poland men's national ice hockey team at the 1976 Winter Olympics in Innsbruck.
