= Maksi Jelenc =

Slovenian cross-country skier

Personal information
- Nationality: Slovenian
- Born: 26 May 1951 (age 73); Kranj, Yugoslavia

Sport
- Sport: Cross-country skiing

Maksi Jelenc (born 26 May 1951) is a Slovenian cross-country skier. He competed in the men's 15 kilometre event at the 1976 Winter Olympics.
