= Karol Żurek =

Polish ice hockey player

- Born: January 28, 1949 (age 76); Katowice, Poland
- Height: 5 ft 10 in (178 cm)
- Weight: 168 lb (76 kg; 12 st 0 lb)
- Position: Centre
- Played for: Baildon Katowice
- National team: Poland
- NHL draft: Undrafted
- Playing career: ?–?

Karol Żurek (born January 28, 1949) is a former Polish ice hockey player. He played for Poland men's national ice hockey team at the 1976 Winter Olympics in Innsbruck.
