= Toni Tišlar =

Slovenian ice hockey player (born 1967)

- Born: May 9, 1967 (age 59) Jesenice, Yugoslavia
- Height: 6 ft 1 in (185 cm)
- Weight: 202 lb (92 kg; 14 st 6 lb)
- Played for: HK Acroni Jesenice; HK Kranjska Gora; HDD Olimpija Ljubljana; HK MK Bled
- National team: Yugoslavia and Slovenia
- Playing career: 1983–2005

Toni Tislar (born May 9, 1967 in Jesenice, Yugoslavia) is a retired Slovenian professional ice hockey player.

== Career ==
=== Club career ===
In 1983, Tislar made his debut in the Yugoslav Ice Hockey League with HK Kranjska Gora. He won the Yugoslav Ice Hockey League title with HK Acroni Jesenice in 1988 and 1989. He played with HDD Olimpija Ljubljana from 1991–1995, HK MK Bled from 1995–1997, and for 2002–03. From 2003 until his retirement in 2005, he played again for HK Acroni Jesenice.

=== International career ===
Tislar participated in 10 IIHF World Championships with Yugoslavia and Slovenia. In 144 international games, he scored 46 goals and 42 assists.
