= Koji Wakasa =

Japanese ice hockey player

Personal information
- Nationality: Japanese
- Born: 12 July 1953 (age 72) Hokkaido, Japan

Sport
- Sport: Ice hockey

Koji Wakasa (若狭 浩嗣, Wakasa Kōji; born 12 July 1953) is a Japanese former ice hockey defenceman. He competed in the men's tournaments at the 1976 Winter Olympics and the 1980 Winter Olympics.
