= Franz Krienbühl =

Swiss speed skater

Franz Krienbühl (24 March 1929 – 13 April 2002) was a Swiss speed skater who is mostly known for his inventions that changed the sport.

Starting his international sporting career only in his late thirties at the 1968 Winter Olympics of Grenoble, Krienbühl mostly skated at the back of the field. However, in 1974, he introduced the one-piece skin suit into speed skating. In spite of the fact that he improved his times dramatically, he was initially laughed at. However, when other skaters also showed improvement, the top skaters quickly switched to the suits as well. Krienbühl also introduced minor improvements for skates.

Krienbühl's best performance was the eighth position on the 10,000 m at the 1976 Winter Olympics. He stopped speed skating internationally at age 48 the next season, though he continued to skate competitively until 1986. During his career, he won at least 14 Swiss Allround Championships. In 1989, Krienbühl was severely injured in a cycling accident. He died in April 2002, aged 73.
