= Yoshiaki Kyoya =

Japanese ice hockey player

Personal information
- Nationality: Japanese
- Born: 5 April 1951 (age 74) Hokkaido, Japan

Sport
- Sport: Ice hockey

Yoshiaki Kyoya (京谷 佳明, Kyōya Yoshiaki; born 5 April 1951) is a Japanese former ice hockey player. He competed in the men's tournaments at the 1976 Winter Olympics and the 1980 Winter Olympics.
