= Franz Renggli =

Swiss cross-country skier

Personal information
- Nationality: Swiss
- Born: 1 September 1952 (age 72)

Sport
- Sport: Cross-country skiing

Franz Renggli (born 1 September 1952) is a Swiss cross-country skier. He competed at the 1976 Winter Olympics and the 1980 Winter Olympics.
