= Andrej Koželj =

Slovenian alpine skier (born 1955)

Personal information
- Nationality: Slovenian
- Born: 27 November 1955 (age 70) Maribor, Yugoslavia

Sport
- Sport: Alpine skiing

Andrej Koželj (born 27 November 1955) is a Slovenian alpine skier. He competed in three events at the 1976 Winter Olympics, representing Yugoslavia.
