= Andre Jorns =

Swiss ice hockey player

- Born: January 11, 1951 (age 74); Switzerland
- Height: 5 ft 5 in (165 cm)
- Weight: 150 lb (68 kg; 10 st 10 lb)
- Position: Goaltender
- NLA team Former teams: HC Ambrì-Piotta; EHC Arosa
- National team: Switzerland
- Playing career: 1975–1987

Andre Jorns (born January 11, 1951) is a former Swiss professional ice hockey goaltender who last played for HC Ambrì-Piotta in Switzerland's National League A.

Jorns has participated as a member of the Swiss national team at the 1976 Winter Olympics.
