= Jorma Vehmanen =

Finnish ice hockey player

Jorma "Joppe" Vehmanen (born 18 September 1945 in Rauma, Finland) is a retired professional ice hockey player who played in the SM-liiga. He played for HJK Helsinki and Lukko. He was inducted into the Finnish Hockey Hall of Fame in 1989.
