= Rolf Tschiemer =

Swiss ice hockey player

- Born: 23 October 1951 (age 73); Switzerland
- Position: Forward
- Played for: SCL Tigers
- National team: Switzerland
- Playing career: 1971–1993

Rolf Tschiemer (born 23 October 1951) is a retired Swiss professional ice hockey forward who played for SCL Tigers in the National League A. He also represented the Swiss national team at the 1976 Winter Olympics.
