= Walter Dürst (ice hockey, born 1950) =

Swiss ice hockey player

- Born: June 4, 1950 (age 74); Switzerland
- Height: 5 ft 10 in (178 cm)
- Weight: 168 lb (76 kg; 12 st 0 lb)
- Position: Forward
- Played for: HC Davos
- National team: Switzerland
- Playing career: 1968–1982

Walter Dürst (born June 4, 1950) is a retired Swiss professional ice hockey forward who last played for HC Davos in the National League A. He also represented the Swiss national team at the 1976 Winter Olympics.
