= Janez Mlakar =

Slovenian ice hockey player

Personal information
- Nationality: Slovenian
- Born: 31 May 1944 (age 80); Jesenice, Yugoslavia

Sport
- Sport: Ice hockey

Janez Mlakar (born 31 May 1944) is a Slovenian ice hockey player. He competed in the men's tournament at the 1968 Winter Olympics.
