= Ivo Jan =

- Born: April 10, 1942 (age 84) Jesenice, Yugoslavia
- Height: 5 ft 7 in (170 cm)
- Weight: 150 lb (68 kg; 10 st 10 lb)
- Caught: Left
- Played for: HK Acroni Jesenice
- National team: Yugoslavia
- Playing career: 1964–1972

Ivo Jan (born April 10, 1942 in Jesenice, Yugoslavia) is a retired Slovenian professional ice hockey player. He played for HK Acroni Jesenice in the Yugoslav Ice Hockey League. Jan played for the Yugoslavia national ice hockey team at the IIHF World Championships, and the Winter Olympics in 1964, 1968, and 1972.

His son Ivo Jan was an ice hockey player as well, who also served as the head coach of Slovenia national team from 2018 to 2019.
