= Andreas Meyer (ice hockey) =

Swiss ice hockey player

- Born: October 20, 1954 (age 70); Switzerland
- Height: 5 ft 11 in (180 cm)
- Weight: 161 lb (73 kg; 11 st 7 lb)
- Position: Defence
- NLA team: SCL Tigers
- National team: Switzerland
- Playing career: 1975–1988

Andreas Meyer (born October 20, 1954) is a retired Swiss professional ice hockey defenceman who played for SCL Tigers in the National League A. He also represented the Swiss national team at the 1976 Winter Olympics.
