= Miroslav Lap =

- Born: September 8, 1950 (age 74); Ljubljana, Yugoslavia
- Position: Defence
- National team: Yugoslavia
- NHL draft: Undrafted
- Playing career: ?–?

Miroslav Lap (born September 8, 1950) is a former Yugoslav ice hockey player. He played for the Yugoslavia men's national ice hockey team at the 1976 Winter Olympics in Innsbruck.
