= Ivo Ratej =

Slovenian ice hockey player

Personal information
- Nationality: Slovenian
- Born: 11 September 1941 (age 83); Celje, Yugoslavia

Sport
- Sport: Ice hockey

Ivo Ratej (born 11 September 1941) is a Slovenian ice hockey player. He competed in the men's tournaments at the 1964 Winter Olympics, the 1968 Winter Olympics and the 1972 Winter Olympics.
