= Andrej Vidmar =

- Born: March 15, 1956 (age 70) Ljubljana, Yugoslavia
- Height: 5 ft 11 in (180 cm)
- Weight: 198 lb (90 kg; 14 st 2 lb)
- Position: Defence
- Shot: Left
- Played for: HDD Olimpija Ljubljana
- National team: Yugoslavia
- NHL draft: Undrafted
- Playing career: 1980–1984

Andrej Vidmar (born March 15, 1956) is a former Yugoslav ice hockey player. He played for the Yugoslavia men's national ice hockey team at the 1984 Winter Olympics in Sarajevo.
