= Jürg Berger =

Swiss ice hockey player

- Born: February 5, 1954 (age 72) Switzerland
- Height: 5 ft 11 in (180 cm)
- Weight: 176 lb (80 kg; 12 st 8 lb)
- Position: Left wing
- NLA team: SCL Tigers
- National team: Switzerland
- Playing career: 1975–1985

Jürg Berger (born February 5, 1954) is a retired Swiss professional ice hockey forward. He spent the majority of his career with the SCL Tigers in the National League A. He also represented the Swiss national team at the 1976 Winter Olympics.
