= Vlado Jug =

Slovenian ice hockey player (1947–2026)

Personal information
- Nationality: Slovenian
- Born: 6 April 1947 Jesenice, PR Slovenia, FDR Yugoslavia
- Died: 5 October 2026 (aged 79) Poreč, Croatia

Sport
- Sport: Ice hockey

Vlado Jug (6 April 1947 – 5 October 2026) was a Slovenian ice hockey player. He competed in the men's tournament at the 1968 Winter Olympics. Jug died in Poreč on 5 October 2026, at the age of 79.
