= Boris Renaud =

Croatian ice hockey player

Personal information
- Nationality: Croatian
- Born: 2 January 1946 (age 79); Varaždin, Yugoslavia

Sport
- Sport: Ice hockey

Boris Renaud (born 2 January 1946) is a Croatian ice hockey player. He competed in the men's tournaments at the 1964 Winter Olympics, the 1968 Winter Olympics and the 1972 Winter Olympics.
