= Marjan Gorenc =

- Born: February 27, 1964 (age 61); Ljubljana, Yugoslavia
- Height: 5 ft 10 in (178 cm)
- Weight: 179 lb (81 kg; 12 st 11 lb)
- Position: Left wing
- Caught: Left
- Played for: HK Olimpija Ljubljana; HK MK Bled
- National team: Yugoslavia and Slovenia
- Playing career: 1983–2000

Marjan Gorenc (born February 27, 1964) is a retired Slovenian professional ice hockey player.

== Career ==
=== Club career ===
In 1983, Gorenc made his debut with HK Olimpija Ljubljana in the Yugoslav Ice Hockey League. He also played three seasons with HK MK Bled in the Slovenian Hockey League, before retiring in 2000.

=== International career ===
Gorenc represented both Yugoslavia and Slovenia in international competitions. He participated in the World Championships, and the 1984 Winter Olympics.

=== Coaching career ===
He coached HDD Olimpija Ljubljana from 2000 to 2002.
