= Jakob Kölliker =

Swiss ice hockey player and coach

- Born: July 21, 1953 (age 73) Biel/Bienne, Bern, Switzerland
- Height: 185 cm (6 ft 1 in)
- Weight: 86 kg (190 lb; 13 st 8 lb)
- Position: Defense
- Shot: Left
- Played for: EHC Biel-Bienne; HC Ambrì-Piotta
- Current coach: Chinese women's national team Chinese men's national junior team
- Coached for: EHC Biel-Bienne; SC Langnau; Swiss men's national junior team; German men's national team; EV Bomo Thun (SWHL A)
- National team: Switzerland
- Playing career: 1971–1995
- Coaching career: 1993–present

Jakob "Köbi" Kölliker (born 21 July 1953) is a Swiss former professional ice hockey defenceman and current head coach of the Chinese women's national ice hockey team, and the Chinese men's national junior ice hockey team. During his playing career, he represented Switzerland at the Winter Olympics in 1976 and 1988, serving as team captain at the later. He was inducted into the IIHF Hall of Fame in 2007.

He was head coach of EV Bomo Thun of the Swiss Women's Hockey League A (SWHL A) from August 2019 to November 2020 and remains an advisor to the team.
