= Nando Mathieu =

Swiss ice hockey player

- Born: December 22, 1949 (age 75); Switzerland
- Height: 5 ft 8 in (173 cm)
- Weight: 154 lb (70 kg; 11 st 0 lb)
- Position: Forward
- National team: Switzerland
- Playing career: 1969–1976

Nando Mathieu (born December 22, 1949) is a retired Swiss professional ice hockey forward who represented the Swiss national team at the 1976 Winter Olympics.
