= Aldo Zenhäusern =

Swiss ice hockey player

Aldo Zenhäusern (3 August 1951 – 9 January 2012) was a Swiss ice hockey player. He participated at the 1976 Winter Olympics. He was born in Visp, Switzerland and is the father of Gerd Zenhäusern, who was also a hockey player.
