= Ignac Kavec =

Yugoslav and Slovenian ice hockey player

- Born: February 20, 1953 (age 72); Ljubljana, Yugoslavia
- Position: Forward
- National team: Yugoslavia
- NHL draft: Undrafted
- Playing career: 1976–1976

Ignac Kavec (born February 20, 1953) is a former Yugoslav ice hockey player. He played for the Yugoslavia men's national ice hockey team at the 1976 Winter Olympics in Innsbruck. In 2013 he was sentenced to four years in prison for extortion.
