= Blaž Lomovšek =

- Born: December 24, 1956 (age 69) Ljubljana, Yugoslavia
- Height: 5 ft 10 in (178 cm)
- Weight: 183 lb (83 kg; 13 st 1 lb)
- Position: Centre
- Played for: HDD Olimpija Ljubljana; HK Partizan; Medveščak Zagreb
- National team: Yugoslavia
- NHL draft: Undrafted
- Playing career: 1983–1991

Blaz Lomovsek (born December 24, 1956) is a former Yugoslav ice hockey player. He played for the Yugoslavia men's national ice hockey team at the 1984 Winter Olympics in Sarajevo.
