= Murajica Pajič =

- Born: August 24, 1961 (age 63); Jesenice, Yugoslavia
- Height: 5 ft 11 in (180 cm)
- Weight: 190 lb (86 kg; 13 st 8 lb)
- Position: Defence
- Played for: HK Acroni Jesenice; HK Kranjska Gora; HDD Olimpija Ljubljana; KHL Medveščak
- National team: Yugoslavia and Slovenia
- Playing career: 1977–1998

Murajica Pajič (born August 24, 1961 in Jesenice, Yugoslavia) is a retired Slovenian ice hockey player.

== Career ==
=== Club career ===
In 1977, he made his debut in the Yugoslav Ice Hockey League with HK Kranjska Gora, and joined HK Acroni Jesenice the following season. In 1986, Pajic joined HDD Olimpija Ljubljana for one season, before playing two years with KHL Medvescak from 1987 to 1989. Pajic returned to Jesenice for the 1989–90 season, and played for them until he retired in 1998.

=== International career ===
He represented both Yugoslavia and Slovenia in international competitions. Pajic played in six World Championships, and the Winter Olympics in 1984.
