= Renzo Holzer =

Swiss ice hockey player

- Born: March 9, 1952 (age 73) Switzerland
- Height: 6 ft 1 in (185 cm)
- Weight: 187 lb (85 kg; 13 st 5 lb)
- Position: Right wing
- Shot: Left
- Played for: SC Bern; HC Fribourg-Gottéron
- National team: Switzerland
- Playing career: 1968–1987

Renzo Holzer (born March 9, 1952) is a retired Swiss professional ice hockey right winger who played in the Nationalliga A for SC Bern and HC Fribourg-Gottéron. He also represented the Swiss national team at the 1976 Winter Olympics.
