= Slavko Beravs =

Slovenian ice hockey player

- Born: 19 June 1946; Jesenice, Yugoslavia
- Died: 1978 (aged 31–32)
- Height: 5 ft 10 in (178 cm)
- Weight: 175 lb (79 kg; 12 st 7 lb)
- Position: Forward
- National team: Yugoslavia
- Playing career: 1967–1972

Slavko Beravs (b. 19 June 1946 - d. 1978) was a Slovenian ice hockey player. He competed in the men's tournaments at the 1968 Winter Olympics and the 1972 Winter Olympics.
