= Miroslav Gojanović =

Yugoslav and Croatian ice hockey player

- Born: April 20, 1949 (age 77) Zagreb, Yugoslavia
- Height: 5 ft 9 in (175 cm)
- Weight: 157 lb (71 kg; 11 st 3 lb)
- Position: Forward
- National team: Yugoslavia
- NHL draft: Undrafted
- Playing career: 1964–1976

Miroslav Gojanović (born April 20, 1949) is a former Yugoslav ice hockey player. He played for the Yugoslavia men's national ice hockey team at the 1968 Winter Olympics in Grenoble and the 1976 Winter Olympics in Innsbruck.
