= Georg Mattli =

Swiss ice hockey player

- Born: October 18, 1954 Arosa, Switzerland
- Died: August 26, 1991 (aged 36)
- Height: 5 ft 9 in (175 cm)
- Weight: 150 lb (68 kg; 10 st 10 lb)
- Position: Left wing
- Shot: Left
- Played for: EHC Arosa; EHC Kloten
- National team: Switzerland
- Playing career: 1973–1987

Georg Mattli (October 18, 1954 - August 26, 1991) was a former Swiss professional ice hockey left winger who played for EHC Arosa in the National League A. He also represented the Swiss national team at the 1976 Winter Olympics.
