= Peter Klemenc =

Yugoslav ice hockey player

- Born: June 16, 1956 (age 68); Jesenice, Slovenia
- Played for: HK Jesenice
- National team: Yugoslavia
- NHL draft: Undrafted
- Playing career: 1977–1988

Peter Klemenc (born June 16, 1956) is a former Yugoslav ice hockey player. He played for the Yugoslavia men's national ice hockey team at the 1984 Winter Olympics in Sarajevo.
