= Albin Felc =

Slovenian ice hockey player

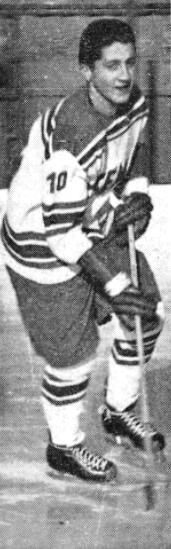
- Born: May 14, 1941 (age 85) Jesenice, Nazi Germany (Occupied Yugoslavia)
- Height: 5 ft 9 in (175 cm)
- Weight: 150 lb (68 kg; 10 st 10 lb)
- Position: Forward
- Shot: Right
- Played for: HK Jesenice; EHC Olten; HC Arosa; HC Asiago; KHL Medveščak Zagreb; HC Canazei; HK Celje
- National team: Yugoslavia
- Playing career: 1958–1982

Albin Felc (born May 14, 1941) is a retired Slovenian professional ice hockey player.

== Career ==
=== Club career ===
In 1958, Felc made his debut in the Yugoslav Ice Hockey League with HK Jesenice. He scored 458 goals in the Yugoslav League, which was the league record until in 1971. Felc also played for teams in Italy and Switzerland. He retired after playing with HK Celje in 1982.

=== International career ===
He represented the Yugoslavia national ice hockey team from 1961–1979, and scored 82 goals and 91 assists in 155 games. Felc participated with Yugoslavia at the Winter Olympics in 1964, 1968, and 1972.

=== Coaching career ===
In 1983, HK Jesenice named Felc their head coach.
