= Igor Beribak =

Yugoslav ice hockey player

- Born: May 18, 1964 (age 61) Ljubljana, Yugoslavia
- Height: 5 ft 9 in (175 cm)
- Weight: 176 lb (80 kg; 12 st 8 lb)
- Position: Defence
- Played for: HDD Olimpija Ljubljana
- National team: Yugoslavia and Slovenia
- NHL draft: Undrafted
- Playing career: 1983–2004

Igor Beribak (born May 18, 1964) is a former Yugoslav ice hockey player. He played for the Yugoslavia men's national ice hockey team at the 1984 Winter Olympics in Sarajevo, and the Slovenia men's national ice hockey team at the 2002 world championships.
