= Ernst Lüthi =

Swiss ice hockey player

- Born: February 20, 1954 (age 71); Switzerland
- Height: 5 ft 9 in (175 cm)
- Weight: 141 lb (64 kg; 10 st 1 lb)
- Position: Defence
- National team: Switzerland
- Playing career: 1976–1976

Ernst Lüthi (born February 20, 1954) is a retired Swiss professional ice hockey defenceman who represented the Swiss national team at the 1976 Winter Olympics.
