= Drago Horvat =

- Born: July 9, 1958 (age 66); Jesenice, Yugoslavia
- Height: 6 ft 0 in (183 cm)
- Weight: 183 lb (83 kg; 13 st 1 lb)
- Played for: HK Jesenice
- National team: Yugoslavia
- NHL draft: Undrafted

Drago Horvat (born July 9, 1958) is a Slovenian ice hockey player who competed for Yugoslavia. He was born in Jesenice, Slovenia. He played for the Yugoslavia men's national ice hockey team at the 1984 Winter Olympics in Sarajevo.
