= Ueli Hofmann =

Swiss ice hockey player

- Born: September 1, 1953 (age 72); Switzerland
- Height: 5 ft 11 in (180 cm)
- Weight: 192 lb (87 kg; 13 st 10 lb)
- Position: Defence
- NLA team Former teams: EHC Olten; EHC Arosa; HC Ambrì-Piotta
- National team: Switzerland
- Playing career: 1976–1989

Ueli Hofmann (born September 1, 1953) is a retired Swiss professional ice hockey defenceman who last played for EHC Olten in the National League A. He also represented the Swiss national team at the 1976 Winter Olympics.
