= Franc Smolej (ice hockey) =

- Born: July 18, 1940 (age 84); Jesenice, Yugoslavia
- Height: 5 ft 10 in (178 cm)
- Weight: 167 lb (76 kg; 11 st 13 lb)
- Played for: HK Acroni Jesenice
- National team: Yugoslavia

Franc Smolej (born July 18, 1940) is a Slovenian retired professional ice hockey player.

== Career ==
Smolej played for HK Acroni Jesenice in the Yugoslav Ice Hockey League and the Yugoslavia national ice hockey team at the Winter Olympics in 1964 and 1968.
