= Mustafa Bešić =

- Born: March 12, 1961 (age 64); Sanski Most, Yugoslavia
- Height: 5 ft 10 in (178 cm)
- Weight: 176 lb (80 kg; 12 st 8 lb)
- Position: Centre
- Shot: Left
- Played for: HK Jesenice
- National team: Yugoslavia
- NHL draft: Undrafted
- Playing career: 1982–1996; 2000–2003

Mustafa Bešić (born March 12, 1961) is a former Slovenian ice hockey player of Bosnian origin. He played for the Yugoslavia men's national ice hockey team at the 1984 Winter Olympics in Sarajevo. He played almost his entire career in the Italian league.
