= Jože Kovač =

- Born: September 23, 1961 (age 63); Ljubljana, Yugoslavia
- Position: Defence
- Shot: Left
- Played for: HDD Olimpija Ljubljana
- National team: Yugoslavia
- NHL draft: Undrafted
- Playing career: 1978–1990

Joze Kovac (born September 23, 1961) is a former Yugoslav ice hockey player. He played for the Yugoslavia men's national ice hockey team at the 1984 Winter Olympics in Sarajevo.
