= Anton Jože Gale =

Slovenian ice hockey player (1944–2018)

Personal information
- Nationality: Slovenian
- Born: March 26, 1944; Jesenice, Yugoslavia
- Died: 25 March 2018 (aged 73); Ljubljana, Slovenia

Sport
- Sport: Ice hockey
- Position: Goaltender

Anton Jože Gale (26 March 1944 — 25 March 2018) was a Slovenian ice hockey player. He competed in the men's tournaments at the 1964 Winter Olympics, the 1968 Winter Olympics and the 1972 Winter Olympics.
