= Cveto Pretnar =

Slovenian ice hockey player (1957–2018)

- Born: 27 January 1957; Jesenice, Yugoslavia
- Died: 25 April 2018 (aged 61)
- Height: 5 ft 10 in (178 cm)
- Weight: 185 lb (84 kg; 13 st 3 lb)
- Position: Goaltender
- Caught: Left
- Played for: HK Jesenice
- National team: Yugoslavia
- NHL draft: Undrafted
- Playing career: 1983–1993

Cveto Pretnar (27 January 1957 – 25 April 2018) was a Slovenian ice hockey goaltender. He played for the Yugoslavia men's national ice hockey team at the 1984 Winter Olympics in Sarajevo. Pretnar stopped twenty-one shots in the second period of Yugoslavia's 0-11 loss to Sweden.

Pretnar died on 25 April 2018 at the age of 61.
