= Drago Savić =

- Born: May 4, 1949 (age 77) Ljubljana, Yugoslavia
- Height: 6 ft 1 in (185 cm)
- Weight: 183 lb (83 kg; 13 st 1 lb)
- Position: Defence
- National team: Yugoslavia
- NHL draft: Undrafted
- Playing career: 1972–1979

Karel Drago Savić (born May 4, 1949) is a Slovenian ice hockey player who competed for Yugoslavia. He played for the Yugoslavia men's national ice hockey team at the 1972 Winter Olympics in Sapporo and the 1976 Winter Olympics in Innsbruck.
