= Bogo Jan =

Slovenian ice hockey player (1944–2018)

Personal information
- Nationality: Slovenian
- Born: February 20, 1944; Jesenice, Yugoslavia
- Died: 10 March 2018 (aged 74); Radovljica, Slovenia

Sport
- Sport: Ice hockey

Bogo Jan (20 February 1944 — 10 March 2018) was a Slovenian ice hockey player. He competed in the men's tournaments at the 1964 Winter Olympics, the 1968 Winter Olympics and the 1972 Winter Olympics.
