= Anton Neininger =

Swiss ice hockey player

- Born: August 10, 1950 (age 74); Switzerland
- Height: 5 ft 7 in (170 cm)
- Weight: 141 lb (64 kg; 10 st 1 lb)
- Position: Forward
- National team: Switzerland
- Playing career: 1972–1976

Anton Neininger (born August 10, 1950) is a former Swiss ice hockey player who played for the Switzerland men's national ice hockey team at the 1972 and 1976 Olympics.
