= Rudi Hiti =

Slovenian ice hockey player and coach

- Born: 4 November 1946 (age 79) Jesenice, Yugoslavia
- Height: 5 ft 10 in (178 cm)
- Weight: 172 lb (78 kg; 12 st 4 lb)
- Position: Forward
- Shot: Right
- Played for: Acroni Jesenice; Kranjska Gora; Olimpija; Alleghe; Bolzano; Bled
- National team: Yugoslavia
- Playing career: 1962–1986

Rudolf Hiti (born 4 November 1946 in Jesenice, Yugoslavia) is a retired Slovenian ice hockey player and coach. In Slovenia he played for HK Kranjska Gora, HK Acroni Jesenice and HDD Olimpija Ljubljana, winning the Yugoslav league four times. Later he played in Italy, winning the Italian league three times with HC Bolzano, where his #13 jersey was retired. He played at 17 World Championships for Yugoslavia, which is a world record, and two Olympic Games. In 1970 he was close to signing for NHL club Chicago Blackhawks, but an injury on the first friendly game for Blackhawks prevented him from signing the contract.

On 5 May 2009, he was inducted into the IIHF Hall of Fame, as the second Slovene.
