= Bojan Kumar =

Yugoslav and Slovenian ice hockey player

- Born: August 3, 1950 (age 74); Ljubljana, Yugoslavia
- Height: 6 ft 1 in (185 cm)
- Weight: 190 lb (86 kg; 13 st 8 lb)
- Position: Defence
- Played for: HDD Tilia Olimpija
- National team: Yugoslavia
- NHL draft: Undrafted
- Playing career: ?–?

Bojan Kumar (born August 3, 1950) is a former Yugoslav ice hockey player. He played for the Yugoslavia men's national ice hockey team at the 1972 Winter Olympics in Sapporo and the 1976 Winter Olympics in Innsbruck.
