= Janez Albreht (ice hockey) =

Yugoslav ice hockey player

- Born: February 9, 1940 (age 85); Ljubljana, Yugoslavia
- Position: Goaltender
- National team: Yugoslavia
- NHL draft: Undrafted
- Playing career: ?–?

Janez Albreht (born February 9, 1940) is a Yugoslav and Slovenian former ice hockey goaltender. He played for the Yugoslavia men's national ice hockey team at the 1976 Winter Olympics in Innsbruck.
