= Zvonko Šuvak =

Slovenian ice hockey player

- Born: August 29, 1958 (age 67) Jesenice, Yugoslavia
- Height: 6 ft 0 in (183 cm)
- Weight: 179 lb (81 kg; 12 st 11 lb)
- Position: Left wing
- Played for: HK Acroni Jesenice; HK Kranjska Gora; HK Vojvodina; HK MK Bled
- National team: Yugoslavia
- Playing career: 1976–1993

Zvonko Šuvak (born August 29, 1958 in Jesenice, Yugoslavia) is a retired Slovenian professional ice hockey player.

== Career ==
=== Club career ===
Šuvak began his career in the Yugoslav Ice Hockey League with HK Kranjska Gora in 1976. The following year, he joined HK Acroni Jesenice. Šuvak is the all-time leading scorer of the Yugoslav Ice Hockey League, with 520 goals and 314 assists.

=== International career ===
He represented Yugoslavia at nine IIHF World Championships, and the Winter Olympics in 1984. In 155 games, Šuvak scored 129 goals and 73 assists.
