= Daniel Widmer (ice hockey) =

Swiss ice hockey player

- Born: April 29, 1953 (age 71); Switzerland
- Height: 5 ft 10 in (178 cm)
- Weight: 176 lb (80 kg; 12 st 8 lb)
- Position: Left wing
- National team: Switzerland
- Playing career: 1975–1999

Daniel Widmer (born April 29, 1953) is a retired Swiss professional ice hockey left winger who represented the Swiss national team at the 1976 Winter Olympics.
