= Marjan Žbontar =

- Born: March 24, 1954 (age 70); Jesenice, Yugoslavia
- Position: Goaltender
- National team: Yugoslavia
- NHL draft: Undrafted
- Playing career: 1976–1979

Marian Žbontar (born March 24, 1954) is a former Yugoslav ice hockey goaltender. He played for the Yugoslavia men's national ice hockey team at the 1976 Winter Olympics in Innsbruck.

His brother, Franci Žbontar, played for the Yugoslav national ice hockey team at the 1972 and 1976 Winter Olympics.
