= Božidar Beravs =

- Born: December 24, 1948 (age 76); Ljubljana, Yugoslavia
- Height: 5 ft 9 in (175 cm)
- Weight: 163 lb (74 kg; 11 st 9 lb)
- Position: Defence
- Played for: HDD Tilia Olimpija
- National team: Yugoslavia
- NHL draft: Undrafted
- Playing career: 1971–1976

Božidar "Božo" Beravs (born December 24, 1948) is a former Slovenian ice hockey player. He played for the Yugoslavia men's national ice hockey team at the 1972 Winter Olympics in Sapporo and the 1976 Winter Olympics in Innsbruck.

His older brother, Slavko Beravs, played for the Yugoslav national ice hockey team at the 1968 and 1972 Winter Olympics.
