= Rudolf Knez =

Slovenian ice hockey player (1944–2022)

Personal information
- Nationality: Slovenian
- Born: 12 September 1944; Jesenice, Reichsgau Kärnten, Nazi Germany (now Slovenia)
- Died: 5 August 2022 (aged 77)

Sport
- Sport: Ice hockey

Rudolf Knez (12 September 1944 – 5 August 2022) was a Slovenian ice hockey player. He competed in the men's tournaments at the 1968 Winter Olympics and the 1972 Winter Olympics. He died on 5 August 2022, at the age of 77.
