= Bernhard Neininger =

Swiss ice hockey player

- Born: 19 October 1955 (age 70) Switzerland
- Height: 5 ft 9 in (175 cm)
- Weight: 141 lb (64 kg; 10 st 1 lb)
- Position: Right wing
- Played for: HC La Chaux-de-Fonds; EHC Arosa
- National team: Switzerland
- Playing career: 1975–1986; 1993–1999

Bernhard Neininger (born 19 October 1955) is a retired Swiss professional ice hockey forward who played for HC La Chaux-de-Fonds and EHC Arosa in the National League A. He also represented the Swiss national team at the 1976 Winter Olympics.
