= Viktor Ravnik =

Slovenian ice hockey player

Personal information
- Nationality: Slovenian
- Born: 19 October 1941 (age 83); Jesenice, Yugoslavia

Sport
- Sport: Ice hockey

Viktor Ravnik (born 19 October 1941) is a Slovenian ice hockey player. He competed in the men's tournaments at the 1964 Winter Olympics, the 1968 Winter Olympics and the 1972 Winter Olympics.
