= Janez Petač =

- Born: 6 March 1949; Ljubljana, Yugoslavia
- Died: 23 May 2011 (aged 62); Ljubljana, Slovenia
- Position: Right wing
- Played for: HDD Tilia Olimpija
- National team: Yugoslavia
- NHL draft: Undrafted
- Playing career: 1976–1979

Janez Petač (6 March 1949 – 23 May 2011) was a former Yugoslav ice hockey player. He played for the Yugoslavia men's national ice hockey team at the 1976 Winter Olympics in Innsbruck.
