= Bogdan Jakopič =

Yugoslav ice hockey player

- Born: January 18, 1948 (age 78) Ljubljana, Yugoslavia
- National team: Yugoslavia
- NHL draft: Undrafted
- Playing career: ?–?

Bogdan Jakopič (born January 18, 1948) is a former Yugoslav ice hockey player. He played for the Yugoslavia men's national ice hockey team at the 1976 Winter Olympics in Innsbruck.
