= Janez Puterle =

Yugoslav ice hockey player (1950–2020)

- Born: February 21, 1950; Ljubljana, Yugoslavia
- Died: September 19, 2020 (aged 70)
- Height: 5 ft 9 in (175 cm)
- Weight: 160 lb (73 kg; 11 st 6 lb)
- Position: Right wing
- Played for: HDD Tilia Olimpija
- National team: Yugoslavia
- Playing career: 1972–1978

Janez Puterle (February 21, 1950 – September 19, 2020) was a Slovenian ice hockey player. He played for the Yugoslavia men's national ice hockey team at the 1972 Winter Olympics in Sapporo and the 1976 Winter Olympics in Innsbruck.
