= Ivan Ščap =

- Born: December 3, 1955 (age 69); Jesenice, Yugoslavia
- Height: 5 ft 10 in (178 cm)
- Weight: 172 lb (78 kg; 12 st 4 lb)
- Position: Defence
- Played for: HK Jesenice
- National team: Yugoslavia
- NHL draft: Undrafted
- Playing career: 1976–1984

Ivan Scap (born December 3, 1955) is a former Yugoslav ice hockey player. He played for the Yugoslavia men's national ice hockey team at the 1976 Winter Olympics in Innsbruck and the 1984 Winter Olympics in Sarajevo.
