= Tomaž Lepša =

- Born: June 11, 1955 (age 69); Ljubljana, Yugoslavia
- Height: 5 ft 11 in (180 cm)
- Weight: 181 lb (82 kg; 12 st 13 lb)
- Position: Centre
- Played for: HK Celje
- National team: Yugoslavia
- NHL draft: Undrafted
- Playing career: 1976–1984

Tomaž Lepša (born June 11, 1955) is a former Yugoslav ice hockey player. He played for the Yugoslavia men's national ice hockey team at the 1976 Winter Olympics in Innsbruck and the 1984 Winter Olympics in Sarajevo.
