= Silvo Poljanšek =

- Born: December 25, 1951 (age 74) Jesenice, Yugoslavia
- Height: 5 ft 10 in (178 cm)
- Weight: 165 lb (75 kg; 11 st 11 lb)
- Position: Left wing
- National team: Yugoslavia
- NHL draft: Undrafted
- Playing career: ?–?

Silvo Poljanšek (born December 25, 1951) is a former Yugoslav ice hockey player. He played for the Yugoslavia men's national ice hockey team at the 1972 Winter Olympics in Sapporo and the 1976 Winter Olympics in Innsbruck.
