= Viktor Tišler =

Slovenian ice hockey player (1941–2013)

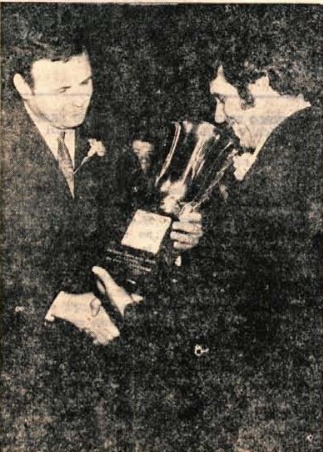

Personal information
- Nationality: Slovenian
- Born: 30 November 1941 Jesenice, Yugoslavia
- Died: 19 September 2013 (aged 71) Jesenice, Slovenia

Sport
- Sport: Ice hockey

Viktor Tišler or Tišlar (30 November 1941 – 19 September 2013) was a Slovenian ice hockey player. He competed in the men's tournaments at the 1964 Winter Olympics, the 1968 Winter Olympics and the 1972 Winter Olympics.
