= Štefan Seme =

Slovenian ice hockey player (1947–2024)

Personal information
- Nationality: Slovenian
- Born: 20 August 1947; Ljubljana, Yugoslavia
- Died: October 2024 (aged 77)

Sport
- Sport: Ice hockey

Štefan Seme (20 August 1947 – October 2024) was a Slovenian ice hockey player. He competed in the men's tournament at the 1972 Winter Olympics.
