= Edo Hafner =

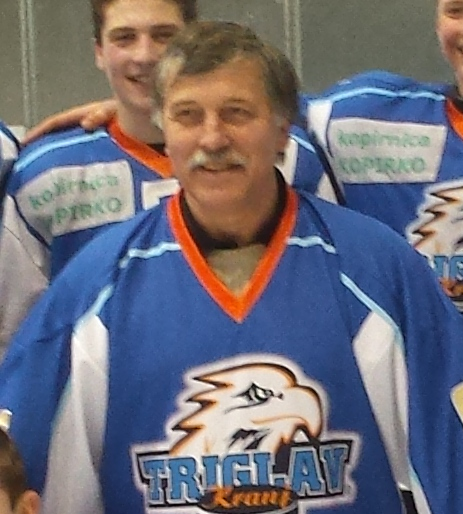
- Born: January 19, 1955 (age 70); Jesenice, Yugoslavia
- Height: 5 ft 9 in (175 cm)
- Weight: 185 lb (84 kg; 13 st 3 lb)
- Position: Centre
- Caught: Left
- Played for: HK Kranjska Gora; HK Jesenice; HC Alleghe
- National team: Yugoslavia
- Playing career: 1969–1991

Eduard Hafner (born January 19, 1955, in Jesenice, Yugoslavia) is a retired Slovenian professional ice hockey player.

== Career ==
=== Club career ===
Hafner began his career with HK Kranjska Gora in the Yugoslav Ice Hockey League in 1969. In 1972, he joined HK Jesenice. Hafner also played with HC Alleghe in the Serie A. He retired in 1991, after a career spanning 23 seasons.

=== International career ===
Hafner represented the Yugoslavia national ice hockey team at eleven IIHF World Championships, and the Winter Olympics in 1976 and 1984. He played in 203 matches with the national team, scoring 108 goals, and adding 79 assists.
