= Franci Žbontar =

- Born: June 12, 1952 (age 72); Jesenice, Yugoslavia
- Height: 5 ft 10 in (178 cm)
- Weight: 172 lb (78 kg; 12 st 4 lb)
- Position: Forward
- National team: Yugoslavia
- NHL draft: Undrafted
- Playing career: ?–?

Franci Žbontar (born June 12, 1952) is a former Yugoslav ice hockey player. He played for the Yugoslavia men's national ice hockey team at the 1972 Winter Olympics in Sapporo and the 1976 Winter Olympics in Innsbruck.

His brother, Marjan Žbontar, played for the Yugoslav national ice hockey team at the 1976 Winter Olympics.
