= Roman Smolej =

- Born: September 6, 1946 (age 78); Jesenice, Yugoslavia
- Height: 5 ft 9 in (175 cm)
- Weight: 172 lb (78 kg; 12 st 4 lb)
- Position: Centre
- National team: Yugoslavia
- NHL draft: Undrafted
- Playing career: 1968–1976

Roman Smolej (born September 6, 1946) is a former Yugoslav ice hockey player. He played for the Yugoslavia men's national ice hockey team at the 1968 Winter Olympics in Grenoble, the 1972 Winter Olympics in Sapporo, and the 1976 Winter Olympics in Innsbruck.
