= Gorazd Hiti =

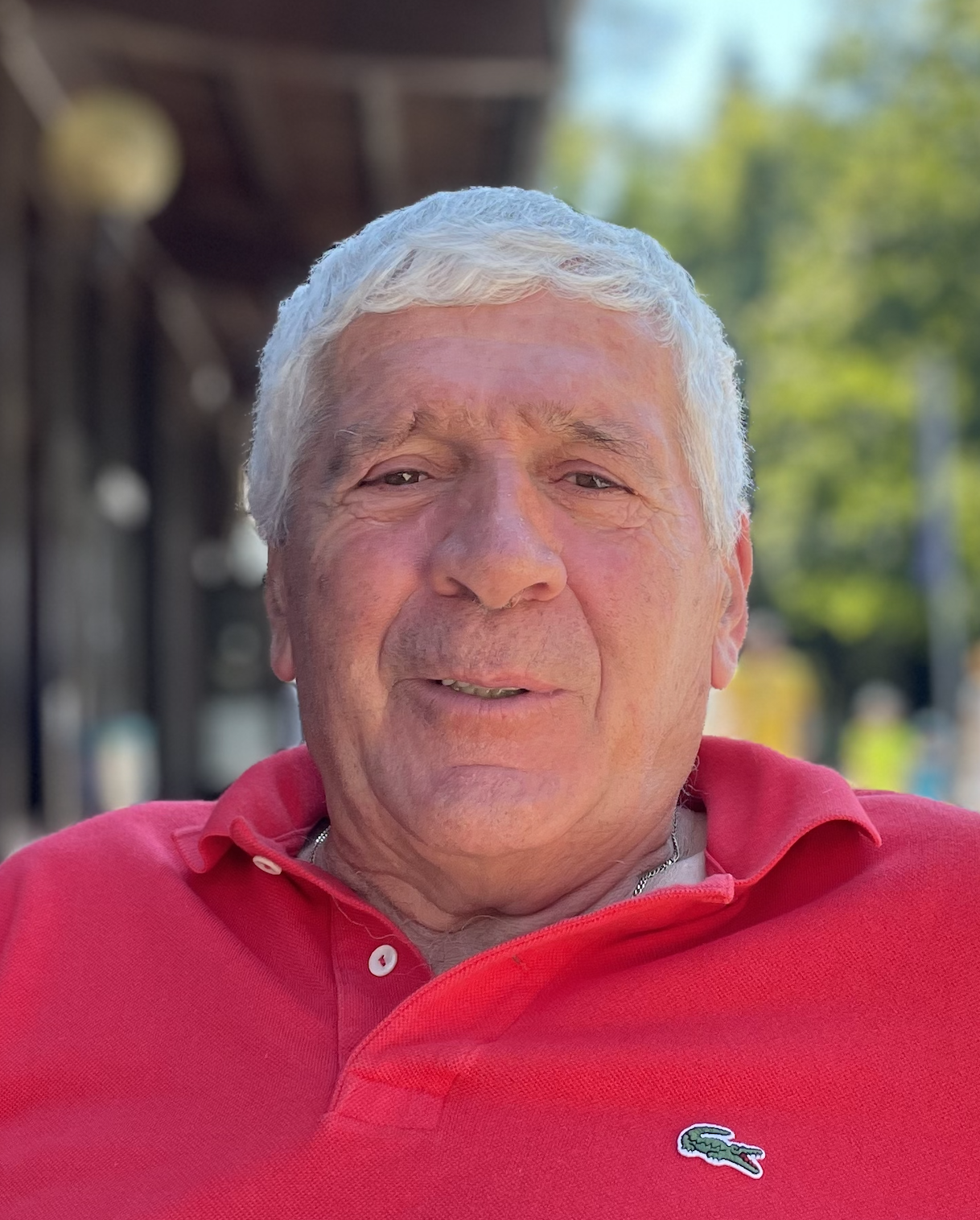
- Born: August 12, 1948 (age 76); Jesenice, Yugoslavia
- Height: 5 ft 8 in (173 cm)
- Weight: 187 lb (85 kg; 13 st 5 lb)
- Position: Winger
- Caught: Left
- Played for: HK Acroni Jesenice; HK Olimpija Ljubljana; HC Bolzano; HC Asiago; AS Renon
- National team: Yugoslavia
- Playing career: 1963–1987

Gorazd Hiti (born August 12, 1948 in Jesenice, Yugoslavia) is a retired Slovenian professional ice hockey player.

== Career ==
=== Club career ===
Hiti began his career with HK Kranjska Gora in the Yugoslav Ice Hockey League in 1963. In 1968, he signed with HK Acroni Jesenice, before moving to HK Olimpija Ljubljana in 1971. He played with HC Bolzano in Italy from 1976-1978. Hiti then retired, before returning to play with Olimpija Ljubljana again in 1983. Hiti ended his career with AS Renon in 1987.

=== International career ===
He represented the Yugoslavia national ice hockey team, and played in 191 matches, scoring 94 goals. Hiti participated in 14 World Championships, and the Winter Olympics in 1972, 1976, and 1984.

=== Coaching career ===
Hiti coached the HK MK Bled junior team, and the Slovenia men's national junior ice hockey team between 1996 and 2004.

== Awards ==
- 1974 - Top scorer at the IIHF World Championships Group B.
