= Yugoslavia men's national ice hockey team =

(Socialist Federal Republic of Yugoslavia) Yugoslavia
- Association: Ice Hockey Federation of Yugoslavia
- Most games: Edo Hafner (203)
- Most points: Zvone Šuvak (202)
- IIHF code: YUG
Home colours	Away colours

First international
- Romania 0–1 (Kingdom of Yugoslavia) Yugoslavia (Ljubljana, Yugoslavia; January 30, 1934); Last international Austria 14–0 (Socialist Federal Republic of Yugoslavia) Yugoslavia (Klagenfurt, Austria; April 12, 1992)

Biggest win
- Yugoslavia (Socialist Federal Republic of Yugoslavia) 28–1 Belgium (Copenhagen, Denmark; March 28, 1987)

Biggest defeat
- Czechoslovakia 24–0 (Kingdom of Yugoslavia) Yugoslavia (Zürich, Switzerland; February 3, 1939)

Olympics
- Appearances: 5 (first in 1964)

IIHF World Championships
- Appearances: 29 (first in 1939)
- Best result: 8th (1974)

IIHF European Championships and World Cup
- Appearances: 3 (first in 1939)
- Best result: 7th (1968)

The Yugoslav national ice hockey team was the national men's ice hockey in the former republic of Yugoslavia. They competed in five Olympic Games competitions. This article discusses the team that represented the Socialist Federal Republic of Yugoslavia and its predecessors, but not the Federal Republic of Yugoslavia. For the FRY, please see the Serbia and Montenegro men's national ice hockey team. The team was largely composed of players from Slovenia: throughout its existence 91% of all players on the national team were Slovene, and the entire roster for the team at the 1984 Winter Olympics, held in Sarajevo were from Slovenia.

== Olympic record ==
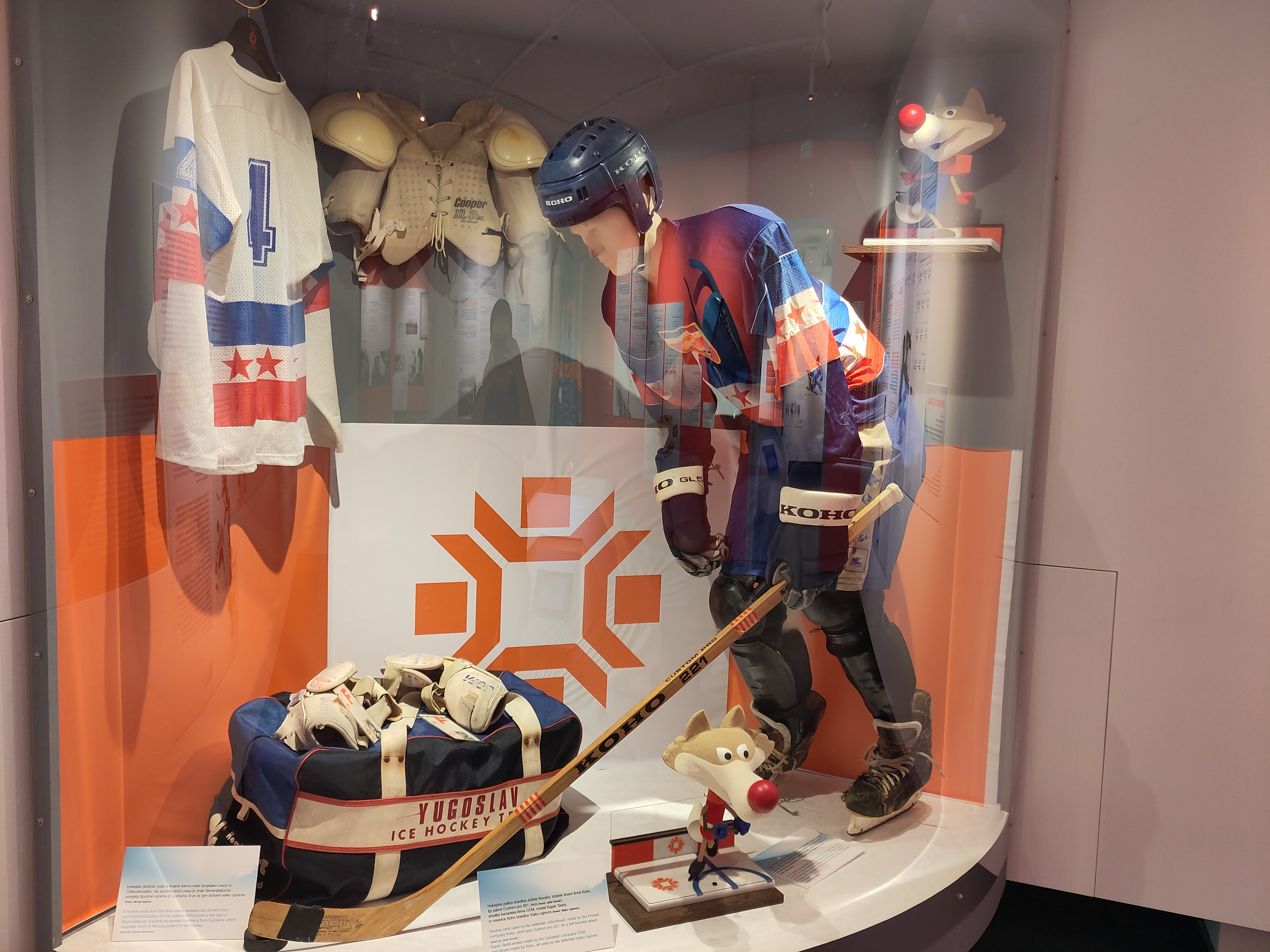
Ice hockey equipment of the Yugoslavian team at the 1984 Olympics

Games	GP	W	T	L	GF	GA	Coach	Captain	Finish	Rank
(Austria) 1964 Innsbruck	8	3	1	4	30	51	?	?	Consolation Round	14th
(France) 1968 Grenoble	6	5	0	1	35	20	?	?	Consolation Round	9th
(Japan) 1972 Sapporo	5	0	1	4	10	25	?	?	Consolation Round	11th
(Austria) 1976 Innsbruck	6	3	0	3	26	27	?	?	Consolation Round	10th
(United States) 1980 Lake Placid	did not qualify, took part in Thayer Tutt Trophy.									
(Socialist Federal Republic of Yugoslavia) 1984 Sarajevo	5	1	0	4	8	37	Štefan Seme	?	First Round	11th
(Canada) 1988 Calgary	did not qualify, took part in Thayer Tutt Trophy.									
(France) 1992 Albertville	Didn't Qualify									

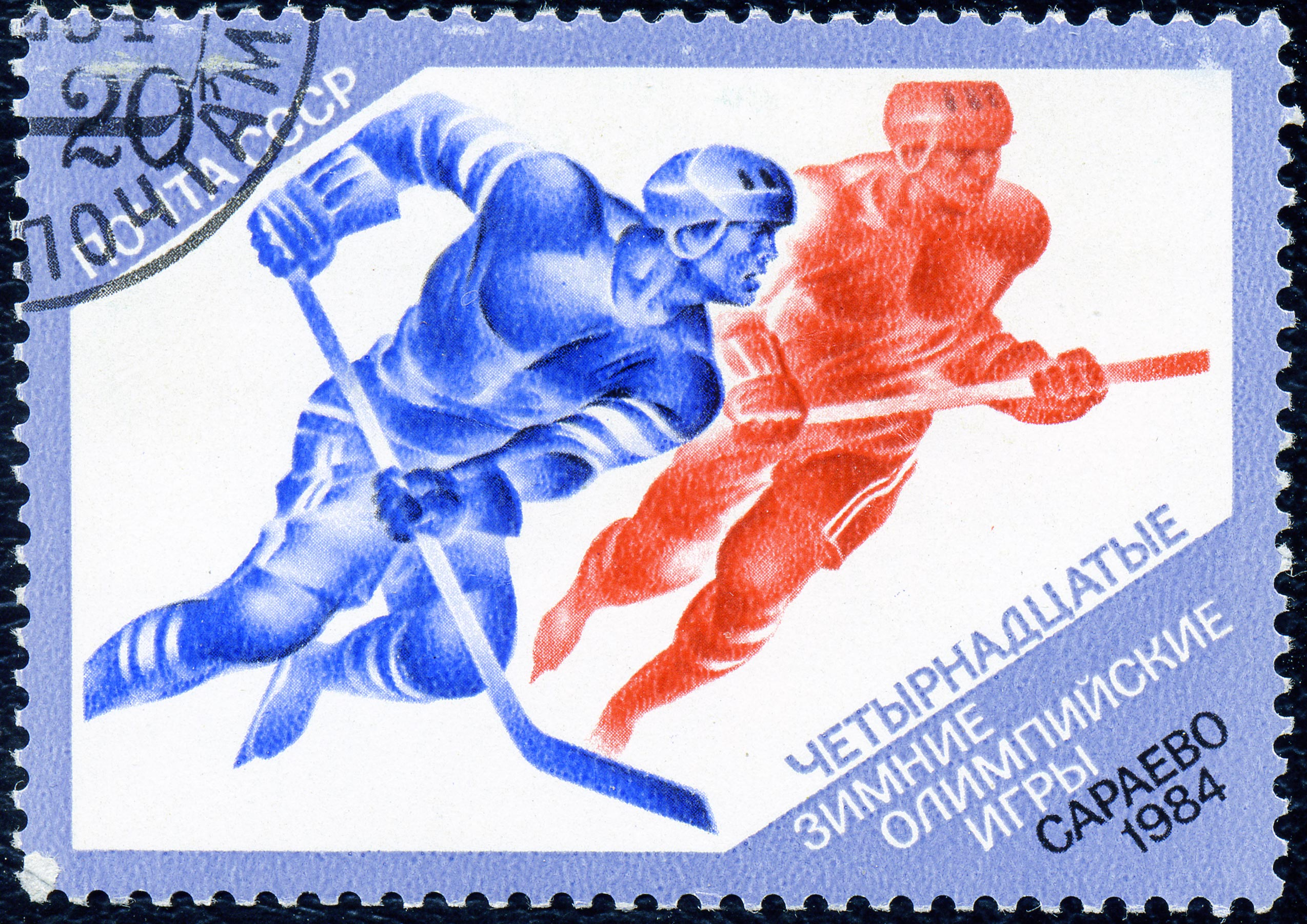
Host of the 1984 Olympic tournament

=== Thayer Tutt Trophy record ===
Games	GP	W	T	L	GF	GA	Coach	Captain	Finish	Rank
(Socialist Federal Republic of Yugoslavia) 1980 Ljubljana	9	2	3	4	32	19	?	?	Championship Round	3rd place, bronze medalist(s)
(France) 1984 Briançon, Gap, Grenoble, and Villard-de-Lans	did not participate, hosted the 1984 Winter Olympics.									
(Netherlands) 1988 Eindhoven and Tilburg	6	3	1	2	25	22	?	?	5th Place Game	5th

== World Championship record ==
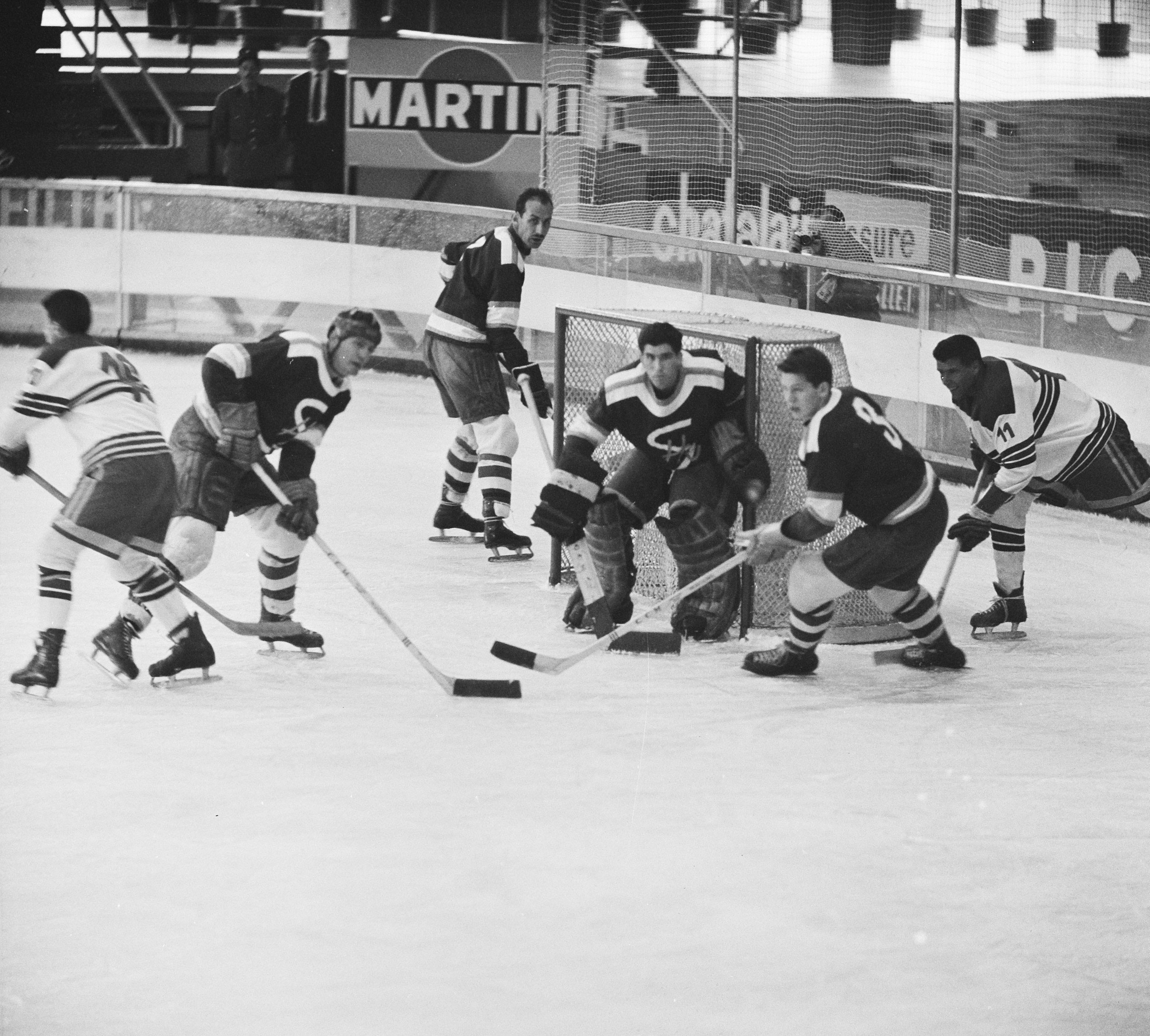
Netherlands vs Yugoslavia at the 1961 Ice Hockey World Championships

World Cup	Results (Socialist Federal Republic of Yugoslavia)
1939	13 th place
1951	6 th place in Pool B
1955	5 th place in Pool B
1961	3 rd place in Pool C
1963	5 th place in Pool B
1965	7 th place in Pool B

- 1966 - 3rd place in Pool B
- 1967 - 4th place in Pool B
- 1969 - 3rd place in Pool B
- 1970 - 4th place in Pool B
- 1971 - 5th place in Pool B
- 1972 - 6th place in Pool B
- 1973 - 3rd place in Pool B
- 1974 - 2nd place in Pool B
- 1975 - 4th place in Pool B
- 1976 - 5th place in Pool B
- 1977 - 7th place in Pool B
- 1978 - 8th place in Pool B
- 1979 - 1st place in Pool C
- 1981 - 7th place in Pool B
- 1982 - 2nd place in Pool C
- 1983 - 8th place in Pool B
- 1985 - 2nd place in Pool C
- 1986 - 7th place in Pool B
- 1987 - 4th place in Pool C
- 1989 - 2nd place in Pool C
- 1990 - 1st place in Pool C
- 1991 - 6th place in Pool B
- 1992 - 8th place in Pool B

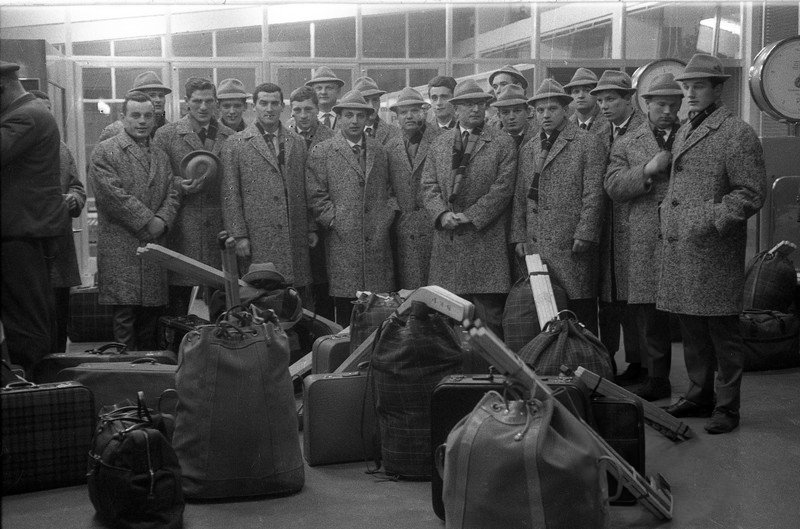
Yugoslav ice hockey team world cup 1965

== European Championship record ==
- 1939 - 11th place
- 1964 - 11th place
- 1968 - 7th place

== Successor teams ==
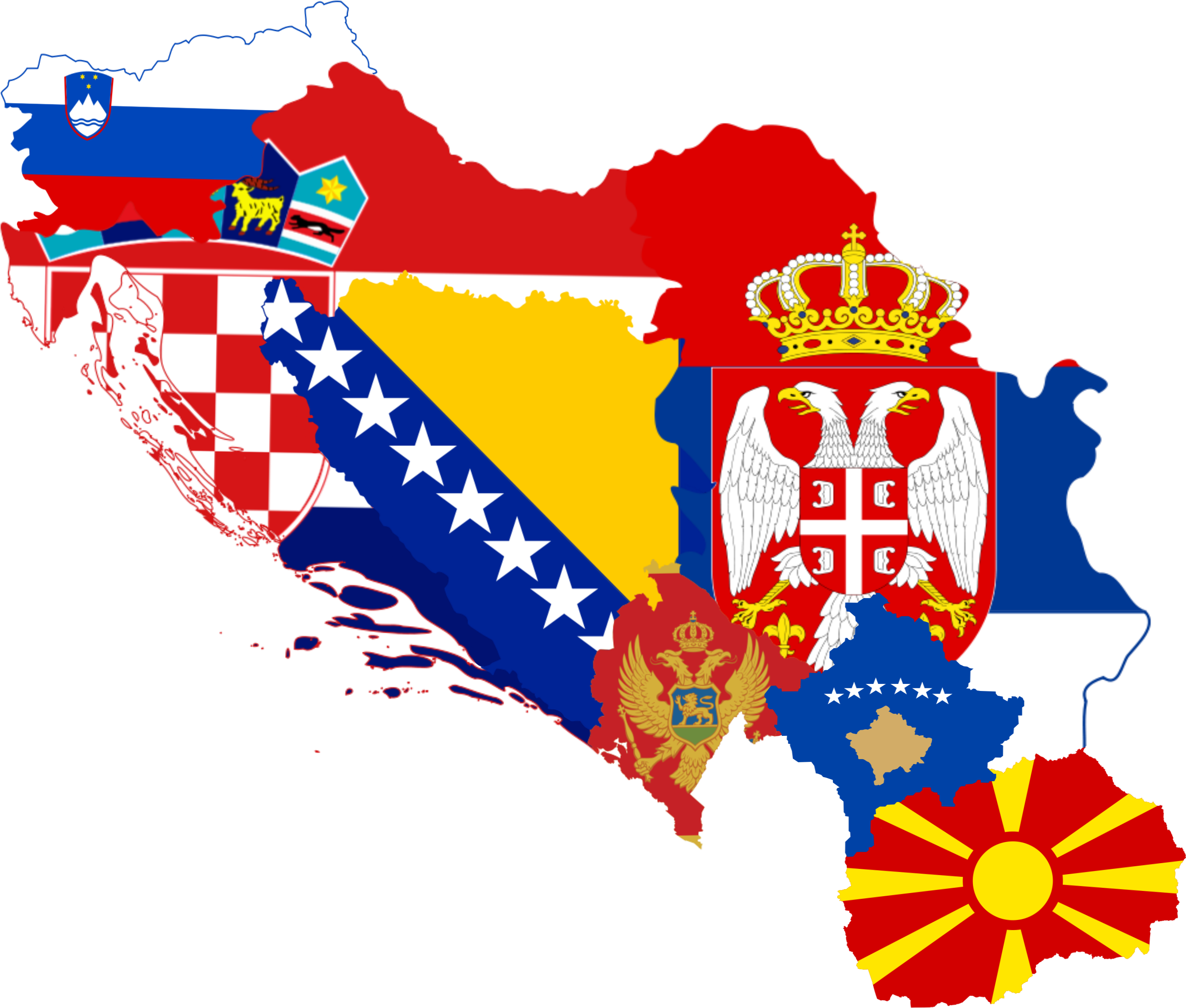

Since the breakup of Yugoslavia, the following successor national teams have competed:

- Bosnia and Herzegovina men's national ice hockey team
- Croatia men's national ice hockey team
- Kosovo men's national ice hockey team
- Macedonia men's national ice hockey team
- Serbia national ice hockey team (Serbia and Montenegro men's national ice hockey team from 1992 to 2006)
- Slovenia men's national ice hockey team
