= Ice hockey at the 1972 Winter Olympics – Rosters =

The ice hockey team rosters at the 1972 Winter Olympics consisted of the following players:

== Czechoslovakia ==
Head coach: Vladimír Kostka

Assistant coach: Jaroslav Pitner

No.	Pos.	Name	Height	Weight	Birthdate	Team
1	G	Vladimír Dzurilla	5 ft 10 in (178 cm)	205 lb (93 kg)	August 2, 1942 (aged 29)	(Czechoslovakia) HC Slovan Bratislava
2	G	Jiří Holeček	5 ft 11 in (180 cm)	163 lb (74 kg)	March 18, 1944 (aged 27)	(Czechoslovakia) HC Košice
3	D	Josef Horešovský	6 ft 1 in (185 cm)	196 lb (89 kg)	July 18, 1946 (aged 25)	(Czechoslovakia) TJ Sparta Praha
4	D	Oldřich Machač	5 ft 9 in (175 cm)	198 lb (90 kg)	April 18, 1946 (aged 25)	(Czechoslovakia) TJ Brno
5	F	Jaroslav Holík	6 ft 0 in (183 cm)	183 lb (83 kg)	August 3, 1942 (aged 29)	(Czechoslovakia) ASD Dukla Jihlava
6	D	Rudolf Tajcnár	5 ft 10 in (178 cm)	201 lb (91 kg)	April 17, 1948 (aged 23)	(Czechoslovakia) HC Slovan Bratislava
7	D	František Pospíšil (C)	6 ft 0 in (183 cm)	185 lb (84 kg)	April 2, 1944 (aged 27)	(Czechoslovakia) TJ Kladno
8	F	Jiří Kochta	6 ft 0 in (183 cm)	183 lb (83 kg)	October 11, 1946 (aged 25)	(Czechoslovakia) TJ Sparta Praha
9	D	Karel Vohralík	5 ft 10 in (178 cm)	176 lb (80 kg)	February 22, 1945 (aged 26)	(Czechoslovakia) TJ Pardubice
10	F	Vladimír Martinec	5 ft 8 in (173 cm)	185 lb (84 kg)	December 22, 1949 (aged 22)	(Czechoslovakia) TJ Pardubice
11	F	Richard Farda	5 ft 9 in (175 cm)	165 lb (75 kg)	November 18, 1945 (aged 26)	(Czechoslovakia) TJ Brno
12	F	Bohuslav Šťastný	5 ft 11 in (180 cm)	183 lb (83 kg)	April 23, 1949 (aged 22)	(Czechoslovakia) TJ Pardubice
14	F	Václav Nedomanský	6 ft 2 in (188 cm)	205 lb (93 kg)	March 14, 1944 (aged 27)	(Czechoslovakia) HC Slovan Bratislava
15	F	Josef Černý	5 ft 8 in (173 cm)	165 lb (75 kg)	October 18, 1939 (aged 32)	(Czechoslovakia) TJ Brno
16	F	Jan Havel	5 ft 9 in (175 cm)	176 lb (80 kg)	November 10, 1942 (aged 29)	(Czechoslovakia) TJ Sparta Praha
18	F	Eduard Novák	5 ft 11 in (180 cm)	190 lb (86 kg)	November 27, 1946 (aged 25)	(Czechoslovakia) TJ Kladno
19	D	Vladimír Bednář	5 ft 11 in (180 cm)	176 lb (80 kg)	October 1, 1948 (aged 23)	(Czechoslovakia) TJ Plzeň
20	F	Jiří Holík	5 ft 11 in (180 cm)	176 lb (80 kg)	July 9, 1944 (aged 27)	(Czechoslovakia) ASD Dukla Jihlava
21	F	Ivan Hlinka	6 ft 0 in (183 cm)	183 lb (83 kg)	January 26, 1950 (aged 22)	(Czechoslovakia) TJ Litvinov

== Finland ==
Head coach: Seppo Liitsola

Assistant coach: Rauli Virtanen

No.	Pos.	Name	Height	Weight	Birthdate	Team
1	G	Jorma Valtonen	5 ft 9 in (175 cm)	161 lb (73 kg)	December 22, 1946 (aged 25)	(Finland) Ässät
2	D	Ilpo Koskela	5 ft 10 in (178 cm)	163 lb (74 kg)	January 29, 1945 (aged 27)	(Finland) Jokerit
3	D	Seppo Lindström	5 ft 11 in (180 cm)	187 lb (85 kg)	May 16, 1941 (aged 30)	(Finland) TuTo
4	D	Juha Rantasila	6 ft 0 in (183 cm)	181 lb (82 kg)	June 5, 1945 (aged 26)	(Finland) HIFK
5	D	Heikki Riihiranta	5 ft 11 in (180 cm)	192 lb (87 kg)	October 4, 1948 (aged 23)	(Finland) HIFK
6	D	Heikki Järn	5 ft 11 in (180 cm)	176 lb (80 kg)	September 23, 1941 (aged 30)	(Finland) HJK
7	D	Pekka Marjamäki	6 ft 1 in (185 cm)	207 lb (94 kg)	December 18, 1947 (aged 24)	(Finland) Tappara
8	F	Jorma Vehmanen	5 ft 10 in (178 cm)	174 lb (79 kg)	September 18, 1945 (aged 26)	(Finland) HJK
9	F	Veli-Pekka Ketola	6 ft 2 in (188 cm)	238 lb (108 kg)	March 28, 1948 (aged 23)	(Finland) Ässät
10	F	Matti Keinonen	5 ft 9 in (175 cm)	163 lb (74 kg)	November 6, 1941 (aged 30)	(Finland) HJK
11	F	Harri Linnonmaa	5 ft 10 in (178 cm)	168 lb (76 kg)	July 30, 1946 (aged 25)	(Finland) HIFK
12	F	Matti Murto	5 ft 11 in (180 cm)	185 lb (84 kg)	April 9, 1949 (aged 22)	(Finland) HIFK
13	F	Juhani Tamminen	5 ft 11 in (180 cm)	185 lb (84 kg)	May 26, 1950 (aged 21)	(Finland) HJK
14	F	Lasse Oksanen (C)	6 ft 0 in (183 cm)	181 lb (82 kg)	December 7, 1942 (aged 29)	(Finland) Ilves
15	F	Jorma Peltonen	5 ft 10 in (178 cm)	176 lb (80 kg)	January 11, 1944 (aged 28)	(Finland) Ilves
16	F	Esa Peltonen	5 ft 10 in (178 cm)	176 lb (80 kg)	February 25, 1947 (aged 24)	(Finland) HJK
17	F	Seppo Repo	5 ft 10 in (178 cm)	181 lb (82 kg)	September 21, 1947 (aged 24)	(Finland) Karhu-Kissat
18	F	Lauri Mononen	6 ft 0 in (183 cm)	181 lb (82 kg)	March 22, 1950 (aged 21)	(Finland) Karhu-Kissat
19	F	Timo Turunen	5 ft 4 in (163 cm)	143 lb (65 kg)	April 8, 1948 (aged 23)	(Finland) Jokerit
20	G	Stig Wetzell	5 ft 8 in (173 cm)	190 lb (86 kg)	October 7, 1945 (aged 26)	(Finland) HJK

== Japan ==
Head coach: (Soviet Union) Nikolai Karpov

Assistant coach: Masami Tanabu

No.	Pos.	Name	Height	Weight	Birthdate	Team
-	F	Takeshi Akiba	5 ft 8 in (173 cm)	154 lb (70 kg)	May 4, 1944 (aged 27)	(Japan) Iwakura Tomakomai
-	F	Tsutomu Hanzawa	5 ft 3 in (160 cm)	139 lb (63 kg)	August 28, 1948 (aged 23)	(Japan) Seibu Railway Team
-	F	Takao Hikigi	5 ft 9 in (175 cm)	159 lb (72 kg)	October 30, 1944 (aged 27)	(Japan) Oji Seishi
-	F	Teruyasu Honma	5 ft 7 in (170 cm)	159 lb (72 kg)	March 7, 1949 (aged 22)	(Japan) Oji Seishi
-	D	Hiroshi Hori	5 ft 7 in (170 cm)	148 lb (67 kg)	September 19, 1949 (aged 22)	(Japan) Seibu Railway Team
-	F	Yoshio Hoshino	5 ft 11 in (180 cm)	176 lb (80 kg)	November 2, 1950 (aged 21)	(Japan) Meiji University
-	F	Minoru Ito	5 ft 7 in (170 cm)	159 lb (72 kg)	March 26, 1948 (aged 23)	(Japan) Iwakura Tomakomai
-	F	Koji Iwamoto (C)	5 ft 8 in (173 cm)	148 lb (67 kg)	January 22, 1942 (aged 30)	(Japan) Iwakura Tomakomai
-	F/D	Isao Kakihara	5 ft 7 in (170 cm)	148 lb (67 kg)	May 1, 1944 (aged 27)	(Japan) Seibu Railway Team
-	F	Hideaki Kurokawa	5 ft 6 in (168 cm)	141 lb (64 kg)	May 8, 1944 (aged 27)	(Japan) Oji Seishi
-	G	Minoru Misawa	5 ft 6 in (168 cm)	137 lb (62 kg)	May 1, 1949 (aged 22)	(Japan) Seibu Railway Team
-	D	Iwao Nakayama	5 ft 6 in (168 cm)	148 lb (67 kg)	July 2, 1949 (aged 22)	(Japan) Seibu Railway Team
-	F	Toru Okajima	5 ft 5 in (165 cm)	143 lb (65 kg)	January 21, 1943 (aged 29)	(Japan) Iwakura Tomakomai
-	G	Toshimitsu Otsubo	5 ft 7 in (170 cm)	148 lb (67 kg)	April 4, 1945 (aged 26)	(Japan) Oji Seishi
-	F	Hideo Suzuki	5 ft 9 in (175 cm)	148 lb (67 kg)	October 21, 1949 (aged 22)	(Japan) Seibu Railway Team
-	F	Yasushio Tanaka	5 ft 10 in (178 cm)	185 lb (84 kg)	August 18, 1945 (aged 26)	(Japan) Seibu Railway Team
-	D	Takashi Tsuburai	5 ft 5 in (165 cm)	134 lb (61 kg)	September 12, 1951 (aged 20)	(Japan) Oji Seishi
-	F	Herb Wakabayashi	5 ft 5 in (165 cm)	154 lb (70 kg)	December 23, 1944 (aged 27)	(Japan) Seibu Railway Team
-	D	Fumio Yamazaki	5 ft 5 in (165 cm)	139 lb (63 kg)	August 7, 1947 (aged 24)	(Japan) Seibu Railway Team

== Norway ==
Head coach: (Sweden) Åke Brask

No.	Pos.	Name	Height	Weight	Birthdate	Team
-	D	Rune Molberg	6 ft 1 in (185 cm)	190 lb (86 kg)	November 21, 1952 (aged 19)	N/A
-	D	Nils Nilsen	6 ft 1 in (185 cm)	163 lb (74 kg)	December 29, 1952 (aged 19)	(Norway) Frisk Asker
1	G	Kåre Østensen	6 ft 0 in (183 cm)	181 lb (82 kg)	December 5, 1943 (aged 28)	(Norway) Frisk Asker
2	D	Thor Martinsen	5 ft 7 in (170 cm)	176 lb (80 kg)	July 12, 1945 (aged 26)	(Norway) Frisk Asker
3	D	Øivind Berg	5 ft 9 in (175 cm)	165 lb (75 kg)	July 13, 1946 (aged 25)	(Norway) Frisk Asker
4	D/F	Terje Steen	5 ft 11 in (180 cm)	174 lb (79 kg)	January 13, 1944 (aged 28)	(Norway) Vålerenge
5	D	Svein Norman Hasen	5 ft 7 in (170 cm)	187 lb (85 kg)	April 18, 1943 (aged 28)	(Norway) Vålerenge
7	F	Bjørn Andressen	5 ft 10 in (178 cm)	165 lb (75 kg)	September 8, 1946 (aged 25)	(Norway) Jar IL
8	F	Steinar Bjølbakk	6 ft 1 in (185 cm)	181 lb (82 kg)	September 6, 1946 (aged 25)	(Norway) Vålerenge
10	F	Bjørn Johansen	5 ft 9 in (175 cm)	176 lb (80 kg)	February 3, 1944 (aged 28)	(Norway) Hasle-Løren
11	F	Morten Sethereng	5 ft 8 in (173 cm)	157 lb (71 kg)	January 15, 1953 (aged 19)	(Norway) Frisk Asker
12	D	Birger Jansen	5 ft 11 in (180 cm)	181 lb (82 kg)	January 7, 1948 (aged 24)	(Norway) Jar IL
13	F	Tom Røymark	6 ft 0 in (183 cm)	172 lb (78 kg)	April 23, 1950 (aged 21)	(Norway) Frisk Asker
14	F	Terje Thoen	6 ft 1 in (185 cm)	181 lb (82 kg)	April 23, 1944 (aged 27)	(Norway) Hasle-Løren
15	F	Roy Jansen	5 ft 9 in (175 cm)	165 lb (75 kg)	May 6, 1950 (aged 21)	(Norway) Vålerenge
16	F	Tom Christensen	6 ft 0 in (183 cm)	172 lb (78 kg)	August 1, 1944 (aged 27)	(Norway) Vålerenge
17	G	Thore Wålberg	6 ft 0 in (183 cm)	181 lb (82 kg)	August 19, 1953 (aged 18)	(Norway) Frisk Asker
18	F	Arne Mikkelsen	6 ft 0 in (183 cm)	168 lb (76 kg)	July 23, 1944 (aged 27)	(Norway) Vålerenge
19	F	Svein Haagensen	6 ft 0 in (183 cm)	165 lb (75 kg)	November 23, 1939 (aged 32)	(Norway) Hasle-Løren
20	D	Jan Kinder	5 ft 10 in (178 cm)	174 lb (79 kg)	May 26, 1944 (aged 27)	(Norway) Hasle-Løren

== Poland ==
Head coach: (Soviet Union) Anatoli Yegorov

Assistant coach: Mieczysław Chmura

No.	Pos.	Name	Height	Weight	Birthdate	Team
1	G	Andrzej Tkacz	5 ft 9 in (175 cm)	148 lb (67 kg)	September 20, 1946 (aged 25)	(Poland) GKS Katowice
2	D	Ludwik Czachowski	5 ft 7 in (170 cm)	172 lb (78 kg)	May 5, 1944 (aged 27)	(Poland) Pomorzanin Torun
3	F	Feliks Góralczyk	5 ft 7 in (170 cm)	176 lb (80 kg)	June 16, 1950 (aged 21)	(Poland) Baildon Katowice
4	D/F	Robert Góralczyk	5 ft 7 in (170 cm)	159 lb (72 kg)	March 21, 1943 (aged 28)	(Poland) Baildon Katowice
5	D	Andrzej Szczepaniec	5 ft 9 in (175 cm)	163 lb (74 kg)	May 10, 1952 (aged 19)	(Poland) Podhale Nowy Targ
6	F	Józef Słowakiewicz	5 ft 8 in (173 cm)	159 lb (72 kg)	February 17, 1945 (aged 26)	(Poland) Podhale Nowy Targ
7	F	Tadeusz Kacik	5 ft 7 in (170 cm)	170 lb (77 kg)	October 6, 1946 (aged 25)	(Poland) Podhale Nowy Targ
8	F	Walenty Ziętara	5 ft 8 in (173 cm)	159 lb (72 kg)	October 27, 1948 (aged 23)	(Poland) Podhale Nowy Targ
9	F	Tadeusz Obłój	5 ft 9 in (175 cm)	174 lb (79 kg)	August 29, 1950 (aged 21)	(Poland) Baildon Katowice
10	F	Krzysztof Birula-Białynicki	6 ft 1 in (185 cm)	205 lb (93 kg)	August 15, 1944 (aged 27)	(Poland) ŁKS Łódź
11	D/F	Stanisław Fryźlewicz	5 ft 9 in (175 cm)	174 lb (79 kg)	April 8, 194 (aged 1777)	(Poland) Podhale Nowy Targ
12	F	Adam Kopczyński	5 ft 9 in (175 cm)	176 lb (80 kg)	August 2, 1948 (aged 23)	(Poland) ŁKS Łódź
13	F	Marian Feter (C)	5 ft 11 in (180 cm)	174 lb (79 kg)	March 13, 1946 (aged 25)	(Poland) Polonia Bydgoszcz
14	F	Wiesław Tokarz	5 ft 10 in (178 cm)	159 lb (72 kg)	August 10, 1951 (aged 20)	(Poland) Podhale Nowy Targ
15	D	Jerzy Potz	5 ft 11 in (180 cm)	187 lb (85 kg)	February 1, 1953 (aged 19)	(Poland) ŁKS Łódź
16	F	Stefan Chowaniec	5 ft 5 in (165 cm)	148 lb (67 kg)	April 21, 1953 (aged 18)	(Poland) Podhale Nowy Targ
17	F	Józef Batkiewicz	5 ft 9 in (175 cm)	161 lb (73 kg)	February 22, 1950 (aged 21)	(Poland) Podhale Nowy Targ
18	F	Leszek Tokarz	5 ft 9 in (175 cm)	148 lb (67 kg)	July 9, 1953 (aged 18)	(Poland) Podhale Nowy Targ
20	G	Walery Kosyl	5 ft 10 in (178 cm)	176 lb (80 kg)	March 17, 1944 (aged 27)	(Poland) ŁKS Łódź

== Soviet Union ==
Head coach: Arkadi Chernyshyev

Assistant coach: Anatoly Tarasov, Boris Kulagin

No.	Pos.	Name	Height	Weight	Birthdate	Team
1	G	Alexander Pashkov	6 ft 0 in (183 cm)	176 lb (80 kg)	August 28, 1944 (aged 27)	(Soviet Union) Dynamo Moskva
2	D	Vitali Davydov	5 ft 8 in (173 cm)	161 lb (73 kg)	April 1, 1939 (aged 32)	(Soviet Union) Dynamo Moskva
3	D	Vladimir Lutchenko	6 ft 1 in (185 cm)	203 lb (92 kg)	January 2, 1949 (aged 23)	(Soviet Union) CSKA Moskva
4	D	Viktor Kuzkin (C)	5 ft 11 in (180 cm)	194 lb (88 kg)	July 6, 1940 (aged 31)	(Soviet Union) CSKA Moskva
5	D	Alexander Ragulin	6 ft 1 in (185 cm)	220 lb (100 kg)	May 5, 1941 (aged 30)	(Soviet Union) CSKA Moskva
6	D	Igor Romishevsky	5 ft 10 in (178 cm)	185 lb (84 kg)	March 25, 1940 (aged 31)	(Soviet Union) CSKA Moskva
7	D	Gennady Tsygankov	5 ft 11 in (180 cm)	209 lb (95 kg)	August 16, 1947 (aged 24)	(Soviet Union) CSKA Moskva
8	D	Valeri Vasiliev	6 ft 0 in (183 cm)	190 lb (86 kg)	August 3, 1949 (aged 22)	(Soviet Union) Dynamo Moskva
9	F	Yuri Blinov	5 ft 10 in (178 cm)	176 lb (80 kg)	January 13, 1949 (aged 23)	(Soviet Union) CSKA Moskva
10	F	Alexander Maltsev	5 ft 9 in (175 cm)	170 lb (77 kg)	April 20, 1949 (aged 22)	(Soviet Union) Dynamo Moskva
11	F	Anatoli Firsov	5 ft 9 in (175 cm)	154 lb (70 kg)	February 1, 1941 (aged 31)	(Soviet Union) CSKA Moskva
12	F	Yevgeni Mishakov	5 ft 9 in (175 cm)	194 lb (88 kg)	February 22, 1941 (aged 30)	(Soviet Union) CSKA Moskva
13	F	Boris Mikhailov	5 ft 9 in (175 cm)	163 lb (74 kg)	June 10, 1944 (aged 27)	(Soviet Union) CSKA Moskva
14	F	Yevgeni Zimin	5 ft 8 in (173 cm)	181 lb (82 kg)	August 6, 1947 (aged 24)	(Soviet Union) Spartak Moskva
15	F	Alexander Yakushev	6 ft 3 in (191 cm)	201 lb (91 kg)	January 2, 1947 (aged 25)	(Soviet Union) Spartak Moskva
16	F	Vladimir Petrov	6 ft 0 in (183 cm)	196 lb (89 kg)	June 30, 1947 (aged 24)	(Soviet Union) CSKA Moskva
17	F	Valeri Kharlamov	5 ft 8 in (173 cm)	161 lb (73 kg)	January 14, 1948 (aged 24)	(Soviet Union) CSKA Moskva
18	F	Vladimir Vikulov	5 ft 9 in (175 cm)	172 lb (78 kg)	July 20, 1946 (aged 25)	(Soviet Union) CSKA Moskva
19	F	Vladimir Shadrin	5 ft 11 in (180 cm)	187 lb (85 kg)	June 6, 1948 (aged 23)	(Soviet Union) Spartak Moskva
20	G	Vladislav Tretiak	6 ft 0 in (183 cm)	201 lb (91 kg)	April 25, 1952 (aged 19)	(Soviet Union) CSKA Moskva

== Sweden ==
Head coach: (Canada) Billy Harris

Assistant coach: Björn Norell

No.	Pos.	Name	Height	Weight	Birthdate	Team
1	G	Leif Holmqvist	5 ft 9 in (175 cm)	172 lb (78 kg)	November 12, 1942 (aged 29)	(Sweden) AIK
2	G	Christer Abrahamsson	6 ft 0 in (183 cm)	174 lb (79 kg)	April 8, 1947 (aged 24)	(Sweden) Leksands IF
3	D	Thommie Bergman	6 ft 3 in (191 cm)	201 lb (91 kg)	December 10, 1947 (aged 24)	(Sweden) Västra Frölunda IF
4	D	Stig Östling	5 ft 10 in (178 cm)	174 lb (79 kg)	December 31, 1948 (aged 23)	(Sweden) Brynäs IF
5	D	Bert-Ola Nordlander	5 ft 11 in (180 cm)	187 lb (85 kg)	August 12, 1938 (aged 33)	(Sweden) AIK
6	D	Thommy Abrahamsson	6 ft 2 in (188 cm)	185 lb (84 kg)	April 8, 1947 (aged 24)	(Sweden) Leksands IF
7	D	Lars-Erik Sjöberg	5 ft 8 in (173 cm)	165 lb (75 kg)	May 4, 1944 (aged 27)	(Sweden) Västra Frölunda IF
8	D	Kjell-Rune Milton	5 ft 11 in (180 cm)	183 lb (83 kg)	May 26, 1948 (aged 23)	(Sweden) Modo AIK
9	D	Kenneth Ekman	6 ft 1 in (185 cm)	176 lb (80 kg)	May 5, 1945 (aged 26)	(Sweden) Tingsryds AIF
10	F	Håkan Wickberg	5 ft 8 in (173 cm)	174 lb (79 kg)	February 3, 1943 (aged 29)	(Sweden) Brynäs IF
11	F	Tord Lundström	6 ft 1 in (185 cm)	179 lb (81 kg)	March 4, 1945 (aged 26)	(Sweden) Brynäs IF
12	F	Stig-Göran Johansson	5 ft 8 in (173 cm)	154 lb (70 kg)	July 18, 1943 (aged 28)	(Sweden) Södertälje SK
14	F	Hans Hansson	-	-	November 26, 1949 (aged 22)	(Sweden) Mora IK
15	F	Lars-Göran Nilsson	5 ft 10 in (178 cm)	165 lb (75 kg)	March 9, 1944 (aged 27)	(Sweden) Brynäs IF
16	F	Mats Åhlberg	5 ft 10 in (178 cm)	174 lb (79 kg)	May 16, 1947 (aged 24)	(Sweden) Leksands IF
17	F	Mats Lindh	5 ft 11 in (180 cm)	172 lb (78 kg)	September 12, 1947 (aged 24)	(Sweden) Västra Frölunda IF
18	F	Björn Palmqvist	5 ft 11 in (180 cm)	176 lb (80 kg)	March 15, 1944 (aged 27)	(Sweden) Djurgårdens IF
19	F	Inge Hammarström	6 ft 0 in (183 cm)	174 lb (79 kg)	January 20, 1948 (aged 24)	(Sweden) Brynäs IF
21	F	Håkan Pettersson	6 ft 1 in (185 cm)	183 lb (83 kg)	May 11, 1949 (aged 22)	(Sweden) Timrå IK
23	F	Hans Lindberg	5 ft 11 in (180 cm)	163 lb (74 kg)	January 16, 1945 (aged 27)	(Sweden) Brynäs IF

== Switzerland ==
Head coach: (Canada) Gaston Pelletier

Assistant coach: (Canada) Derek Holmes

No.	Pos.	Name	Height	Weight	Birthdate	Team
1	G	Gérald Rigolet	5 ft 8 in (173 cm)	157 lb (71 kg)	March 26, 1941 (aged 30)	(Switzerland) HC La Chaux-de-Fonds
2	D	René Huguenin (C)	5 ft 10 in (178 cm)	161 lb (73 kg)	August 9, 1944 (aged 27)	(Switzerland) HC La Chaux-de-Fonds
3	D	Peter Aeschlimann	6 ft 1 in (185 cm)	190 lb (86 kg)	December 7, 1946 (aged 25)	(Switzerland) HC Lugano
4	D	Gaston Furrer	5 ft 10 in (178 cm)	168 lb (76 kg)	May 10, 1945 (aged 26)	(Switzerland) HC La Chaux-de-Fonds
5	D	Charles Henzen	5 ft 8 in (173 cm)	172 lb (78 kg)	October 4, 1945 (aged 26)	(Switzerland) HC La Chaux-de-Fonds
6	F	René Berra	6 ft 0 in (183 cm)	170 lb (77 kg)	February 13, 1942 (aged 30)	(Switzerland) HC La Chaux-de-Fonds
7	F	Anton Neininger	5 ft 7 in (170 cm)	141 lb (64 kg)	August 10, 1950 (aged 21)	(Switzerland) HC La Chaux-de-Fonds
8	F	Jacques Pousaz	5 ft 10 in (178 cm)	170 lb (77 kg)	August 5, 1947 (aged 24)	(Switzerland) HC La Chaux-de-Fonds
9	F	Francis Reinhard	5 ft 7 in (170 cm)	146 lb (66 kg)	May 20, 1944 (aged 27)	(Switzerland) HC La Chaux-de-Fonds
10	F	Michel Turler	5 ft 9 in (175 cm)	172 lb (78 kg)	May 14, 1944 (aged 27)	(Switzerland) HC La Chaux-de-Fonds
11	D	Marcel Sgualdo	6 ft 0 in (183 cm)	192 lb (87 kg)	December 18, 1944 (aged 27)	(Switzerland) HC La Chaux-de-Fonds
12	F	Heinz Jenni	5 ft 10 in (178 cm)	187 lb (85 kg)	July 5, 1951 (aged 20)	(Switzerland) HC La Chaux-de-Fonds
13	F/D	Guy Dubois	5 ft 9 in (175 cm)	172 lb (78 kg)	January 14, 1950 (aged 22)	(Switzerland) HC La Chaux-de-Fonds
14	D	Peter Lehmann	5 ft 8 in (173 cm)	172 lb (78 kg)	January 28, 1946 (aged 26)	(Switzerland) SC Langau
16	F	Paul Probst	6 ft 3 in (191 cm)	198 lb (90 kg)	May 3, 1950 (aged 21)	(Switzerland) HC La Chaux-de-Fonds
17	F	Hans Keller	5 ft 7 in (170 cm)	159 lb (72 kg)	March 24, 1944 (aged 27)	(Switzerland) Zürcher SC
19	F	Gérard Dubi	5 ft 7 in (170 cm)	152 lb (69 kg)	November 27, 1943 (aged 28)	(Switzerland) Lausanne HC
22	G	Alfio Molina	5 ft 9 in (175 cm)	154 lb (70 kg)	April 20, 1948 (aged 23)	(Switzerland) HC Lugano

== United States ==
Head coach: (Canada) Murray Williamson

No.	Pos.	Name	Height	Weight	Birthdate	Team
-	G	Tim Regan	6 ft 2 in (188 cm)	201 lb (91 kg)	December 28, 1949 (aged 22)	(United States) Boston University Terriers
1	G	Pete Sears	5 ft 11 in (180 cm)	181 lb (82 kg)	March 14, 1947 (aged 24)	(United States) SUNY Oswego Lakers
2	D	Jim McElmury	6 ft 0 in (183 cm)	190 lb (86 kg)	October 3, 1949 (aged 22)	(United States) Bemidji State Beavers
3	D	Wally Olds	6 ft 2 in (188 cm)	203 lb (92 kg)	August 17, 1949 (aged 22)	(United States) Minnesota Golden Gophers
4	D	Tom Mellor	6 ft 0 in (183 cm)	183 lb (83 kg)	January 27, 1950 (aged 22)	(United States) Boston College Eagles
5	D	Charlie Brown	6 ft 1 in (185 cm)	196 lb (89 kg)	October 26, 1947 (aged 24)	(United States) Bemidji State Beavers
7	D	Bruce McIntosh	6 ft 0 in (183 cm)	174 lb (79 kg)	March 17, 1949 (aged 22)	(United States) Minnesota Golden Gophers
8	F	Keith Christiansen (C)	5 ft 6 in (168 cm)	154 lb (70 kg)	July 14, 1944 (aged 27)	
9	D	Frank Sanders	6 ft 2 in (188 cm)	216 lb (98 kg)	March 8, 1949 (aged 22)	(United States) Minnesota Golden Gophers
10	F	Henry Boucha	6 ft 1 in (185 cm)	185 lb (84 kg)	June 1, 1951 (aged 20)	
11	F	Robbie Ftorek	5 ft 10 in (178 cm)	154 lb (70 kg)	January 2, 1952 (aged 20)	(Canada) Halifax Atlantics
12	F	Tim Cutter	-	-	-	(United States) Penn Quakers
15	F	Tim Sheehy (C)	6 ft 1 in (185 cm)	185 lb (84 kg)	September 3, 1948 (aged 23)	
16	F	Kevin Ahearn	5 ft 10 in (178 cm)	168 lb (76 kg)	June 20, 1948 (aged 23)	
17	F/D	Craig Sarner	6 ft 0 in (183 cm)	185 lb (84 kg)	June 20, 1949 (aged 22)	(United States) Minnesota Golden Gophers
18	F	Ron Naslund	6 ft 1 in (185 cm)	190 lb (86 kg)	February 28, 1943 (aged 28)	(Switzerland) SC Luzern
19	F	Stu Irving	5 ft 7 in (170 cm)	154 lb (70 kg)	February 2, 1949 (aged 23)	
20	D	Dick McGlynn	6 ft 0 in (183 cm)	190 lb (86 kg)	June 19, 1948 (aged 23)	
21	F	Larry Bader	6 ft 2 in (188 cm)	201 lb (91 kg)	September 12, 1949 (aged 22)	(United States) Penn Quakers
23	D	Mark Howe	5 ft 11 in (180 cm)	190 lb (86 kg)	May 28, 1955 (aged 16)	(United States) Detroit Jr. Red Wings
30	G	Mike Curran	5 ft 9 in (175 cm)	172 lb (78 kg)	April 14, 1944 (aged 27)	(United States) Green Bay Bobcats

== West Germany ==
Head coach: Gerhard Kießling

No.	Pos.	Name	Height	Weight	Birthdate	Team
1	G	Anton Kehle	5 ft 9 in (175 cm)	176 lb (80 kg)	November 8, 1947 (aged 24)	(Germany) EV Füssen
2	D	Otto Schneitberger	5 ft 7 in (170 cm)	161 lb (73 kg)	September 29, 1939 (aged 32)	(Germany) Düsseldorfer EG
3	D	Josef Völk	5 ft 9 in (175 cm)	163 lb (74 kg)	December 3, 1948 (aged 23)	(Germany) EV Füssen
4	D	Rudolf Thanner	5 ft 11 in (180 cm)	172 lb (78 kg)	August 20, 1944 (aged 27)	(Germany) EV Füssen
5	D	Paul Langner	5 ft 9 in (175 cm)	165 lb (75 kg)	October 15, 1949 (aged 22)	(Germany) VfL Bad Nauheim
6	D	Werner Modes	5 ft 10 in (178 cm)	172 lb (78 kg)	September 12, 1949 (aged 22)	(Germany) EV Füssen
7	D	Heiko Antons	6 ft 0 in (183 cm)	159 lb (72 kg)	November 8, 1951 (aged 20)	(Germany) Düsseldorfer EG
8	F/D	Karl-Heinz Egger	5 ft 11 in (180 cm)	190 lb (86 kg)	October 2, 1949 (aged 22)	(Germany) EV Füssen
9	F	Lorenz Funk	6 ft 2 in (188 cm)	198 lb (90 kg)	March 17, 1947 (aged 24)	(Germany) EC Bad Tölz
10	D	Hans Rothkirch	5 ft 9 in (175 cm)	170 lb (77 kg)	April 18, 1951 (aged 20)	(Germany) EC Bad Tölz
11	F	Anton Hofherr	5 ft 11 in (180 cm)	194 lb (88 kg)	December 20, 1947 (aged 24)	(Germany) SC Riessersee
12	F	Reinhold Bauer	6 ft 1 in (185 cm)	209 lb (95 kg)	July 20, 1950 (aged 21)	(Germany) Augsburger EV
14	F	Erich Kühnhackl	6 ft 5 in (196 cm)	214 lb (97 kg)	October 1, 1950 (aged 21)	(Germany) EV Landshut
15	F	Alois Schloder (C)	6 ft 0 in (183 cm)	181 lb (82 kg)	August 11, 1947 (aged 24)	(Germany) EV Landshut
16	D	Georg Kink	5 ft 9 in (175 cm)	168 lb (76 kg)	August 26, 1949 (aged 22)	(Germany) Augsburger EV
17	D/F	Rainer Philipp	6 ft 0 in (183 cm)	194 lb (88 kg)	March 8, 1950 (aged 21)	(Germany) VfL Bad Nauheim
18	F	Bernd Kuhn	5 ft 10 in (178 cm)	185 lb (84 kg)	August 17, 1944 (aged 27)	(Germany) EV Füssen
19	F	Johann Eimansberger	5 ft 11 in (180 cm)	194 lb (88 kg)	September 13, 1946 (aged 25)	(Germany) EC Bad Tölz
20	G	Rainer Makatsch	5 ft 11 in (180 cm)	165 lb (75 kg)	July 1, 1946 (aged 25)	(Germany) Düsseldorfer EG
21	F	Martin Wild	5 ft 11 in (180 cm)	183 lb (83 kg)	December 2, 1952 (aged 19)	(Germany) SC Riessersee

== Yugoslavia ==
Head coach: (Czechoslovakia) Miroslav Klůc

No.	Pos.	Name	Height	Weight	Birthdate	Team
-	F/D	Božidar Beravs	5 ft 9 in (175 cm)	163 lb (74 kg)	December 24, 1949 (aged 22)	N/A
-	F	Slavko Beravs	5 ft 10 in (178 cm)	172 lb (78 kg)	June 19, 1946 (aged 25)	N/A
-	F	Albin Felc	5 ft 9 in (175 cm)	150 lb (68 kg)	May 17, 1941 (aged 30)	(Switzerland) EHC Olten
-	G	Anton Jože Gale	5 ft 10 in (178 cm)	181 lb (82 kg)	March 26, 1944 (aged 27)	(Socialist Federal Republic of Yugoslavia) Olimpija Ljubljana
-	F	Gorazd Hiti	6 ft 2 in (188 cm)	201 lb (91 kg)	April 6, 1947 (aged 24)	N/A
-	F	Rudi Hiti	5 ft 10 in (178 cm)	172 lb (78 kg)	November 4, 1946 (aged 25)	(Socialist Federal Republic of Yugoslavia) Olimpija Ljubljana
-	F/D	Bogo Jan	5 ft 7 in (170 cm)	161 lb (73 kg)	February 20, 1944 (aged 27)	N/A
-	D	Ivo Jan	5 ft 7 in (170 cm)	159 lb (72 kg)	April 10, 1942 (aged 29)	N/A
-	G	Rudi Knez	5 ft 11 in (180 cm)	198 lb (90 kg)	September 12, 1944 (aged 27)	N/A
-	D	Bojan Kumar	6 ft 1 in (185 cm)	190 lb (86 kg)	August 3, 1950 (aged 21)	(Socialist Federal Republic of Yugoslavia) Olimpija Ljubljana
-	F	Silvo Poljanšek	5 ft 10 in (178 cm)	165 lb (75 kg)	December 25, 1951 (aged 20)	N/A
-	F	Janez Puterle	5 ft 9 in (175 cm)	161 lb (73 kg)	February 21, 1952 (aged 19)	N/A
-	D	Ivo Ratej	5 ft 7 in (170 cm)	163 lb (74 kg)	September 11, 1941 (aged 30)	(Socialist Federal Republic of Yugoslavia) Medveščak Zagreb
-	D	Viktor Ravnik (C)	5 ft 11 in (180 cm)	205 lb (93 kg)	October 19, 1941 (aged 30)	N/A
-	F	Boris Renaud	5 ft 9 in (175 cm)	168 lb (76 kg)	January 2, 1946 (aged 26)	(Socialist Federal Republic of Yugoslavia) Medveščak Zagreb
-	D	Drago Savić	6 ft 1 in (185 cm)	183 lb (83 kg)	May 4, 1949 (aged 22)	N/A
-	F	Štefan Seme	5 ft 10 in (178 cm)	161 lb (73 kg)	August 20, 1947 (aged 24)	(Socialist Federal Republic of Yugoslavia) Olimpija Ljubljana
-	F	Roman Smolej	5 ft 9 in (175 cm)	172 lb (78 kg)	September 6, 1946 (aged 25)	N/A
-	F	Viktor Tišler	5 ft 11 in (180 cm)	187 lb (85 kg)	November 30, 1941 (aged 30)	(Socialist Federal Republic of Yugoslavia) Olimpija Ljubljana
-	F	Franci Žbontar	5 ft 10 in (178 cm)	172 lb (78 kg)	June 12, 1952 (aged 19)	N/A

== Sources ==
- Duplacey, James (1998). Total Hockey: The official encyclopedia of the National Hockey League. Total Sports. ISBN 0-8362-7114-9.
- Podnieks, Andrew (2010). IIHF Media Guide & Record Book 2011. Moydart Pres.
- Hockey Hall Of Fame page on the 1972 Olympics
- Wallechinsky, David (1988). The Complete Book of the Olympics. Penguin Books. pp. 614. ISBN 0-14-010771-1.
