= Switzerland at the 1972 Winter Olympics =

- IOC code: SUI
- NOC: Swiss Olympic Association
- Website: www.swissolympic.ch (in German and French)

in Sapporo
- Competitors: 52 (46 men, 6 women) in 6 sports
- Flag bearer: Edmund Bruggmann (alpine skiing)
- Medals Ranked 3rd: Gold 4 Silver 3 Bronze 3 Total 10

Winter Olympics appearances (overview)
- 1924; 1928; 1932; 1936; 1948; 1952; 1956; 1960; 1964; 1968; 1972; 1976; 1980; 1984; 1988; 1992; 1994; 1998; 2002; 2006; 2010; 2014; 2018; 2022; 2026

Switzerland competed at the 1972 Winter Olympics in Sapporo, Japan.

== Medalists ==
Medal	Name	Sport	Event
Gold	Bernhard Russi	Alpine skiing	Men's downhill
Gold	Marie-Theres Nadig	Alpine skiing	Women's downhill
Gold	Marie-Theres Nadig	Alpine skiing	Women's giant slalom
Gold	Jean Wicki; Hans Leutenegger; Werner Camichel; Edy Hubacher	Bobsleigh	Four-man
Silver	Roland Collombin	Alpine skiing	Men's downhill
Silver	Edmund Bruggmann	Alpine skiing	Men's giant slalom
Silver	Walter Steiner	Ski jumping	Men's large hill (90m)
Bronze	Werner Mattle	Alpine skiing	Men's giant slalom
Bronze	Jean Wicki; Edy Hubacher	Bobsleigh	Two-man
Bronze	Alfred Kälin; Albert Giger; Alois Kälin; Eduard Hauser	Cross-country skiing	Men's relay

== Alpine skiing ==
Men

Athlete	Event	Race 1		Race 2		Total	
Athlete	Event	Time	Rank	Time	Rank	Time	Rank
Walter Tresch	Downhill					1:53.19	6
Andreas Sprecher	Downhill					1:53.11	4
Roland Collombin	Downhill					1:52.07	2nd place, silver medalist(s)
Bernhard Russi	Downhill					1:51.43	1st place, gold medalist(s)
Walter Tresch	Giant Slalom	1:35.86	24	1:38.89	8	3:14.75	14
Werner Mattle	Giant Slalom	1:33.44	11	1:37.55	3	3:10.99	3rd place, bronze medalist(s)
Edmund Bruggmann	Giant Slalom	1:33.43	10	1:37.32	1	3:10.75	2nd place, silver medalist(s)
Adolf Rösti	Giant Slalom	1:33.27	7	DSQ	–	DSQ	–

Men's slalom

Athlete	Classification		Final					
Athlete	Time	Rank	Time 1	Rank	Time 2	Rank	Total	Rank
Adolf Rösti	1:44.20	1	58.08	17	56.08	16	1:54.16	15
Andreas Sprecher	1:44.60	2	DNF	–	–	–	DNF	–
Walter Tresch	1:43.91	2	57.90	16	55.61	15	1:53.51	13
Edmund Bruggmann	bye		57.49	12	54.54	7	1:52.03	8

Women

Athlete	Event	Race 1		Race 2		Total	
Athlete	Event	Time	Rank	Time	Rank	Time	Rank
Silvia Stump	Downhill					1:40.92	18
Marianne Hefti	Downhill					1:40.38	12
Bernadette Zurbriggen	Downhill					1:39.49	7
Marie-Theres Nadig	Downhill					1:36.68	1st place, gold medalist(s)
Rita Good	Giant Slalom					DSQ	–
Silvia Stump	Giant Slalom					DNF	–
Bernadette Zurbriggen	Giant Slalom					1:34.17	18
Marie-Theres Nadig	Giant Slalom					1:29.90	1st place, gold medalist(s)
Rita Good	Slalom	DNF	–	–	–	DNF	–
Bernadette Zurbriggen	Slalom	DNF	–	–	–	DNF	–
Marie-Theres Nadig	Slalom	DNF	–	–	–	DNF	–
Silvia Stump	Slalom	49.19	16	DNF	–	DNF	–

== Bobsleigh ==
Sled	Athletes	Event	Run 1		Run 2		Run 3		Run 4		Total	
Sled	Athletes	Event	Time	Rank	Time	Rank	Time	Rank	Time	Rank	Time	Rank
SUI-1	Jean Wicki; Edy Hubacher	Two-man	1:15.61	2	1:15.36	3	1:14.36	6	1:14.00	3	4:59.33	3rd place, bronze medalist(s)
SUI-2	Hans Candrian; Heinz Schenker	Two-man	1:15.89	4	1:16.84	11	1:14.38	8	1:14.33	5	5:01.44	7

Sled	Athletes	Event	Run 1		Run 2		Run 3		Run 4		Total	
Sled	Athletes	Event	Time	Rank	Time	Rank	Time	Rank	Time	Rank	Time	Rank
SUI-1	Jean Wicki; Hans Leutenegger; Werner Camichel; Edy Hubacher	Four-man	1:10.71	1	1:11.44	2	1:10.21	3	1:10.71	3	4:43.07	1st place, gold medalist(s)
SUI-2	Hans Candrian; Erwin Juon; Gaudenz Beeli; Heinz Schenker	Four-man	1:12.36	14	1:11.89	5	1:10.09	1	1:10.22	1	4:44.56	4

== Cross-country skiing ==
Men

Event	Athlete	Race	
Event	Athlete	Time	Rank
15 km	Hansueli Kreuzer	48:55.37	34
15 km	Alois Kälin	46:50.31	17
15 km	Albert Giger	46:38.36	14
15 km	Eduard Hauser	46:30.53	11
30 km	Werner Geeser	1'46:20.36	41
30 km	Alfred Kälin	1'41:35.34	17
30 km	Eduard Hauser	1'40:14.98	14
30 km	Alois Kälin	1'38:40.72	7
50 km	Giuseppe Dermon	2'56:24.21	26
50 km	Louis Jäggi	2'53:00.78	23
50 km	Ulrich Wenger	2'49:35.35	14
50 km	Werner Geeser	2'44:34.13	6

Men's 4 × 10 km relay

Athletes	Race	
Athletes	Time	Rank
Alfred Kälin; Albert Giger; Alois Kälin; Eduard Hauser	2'07:00.06	3rd place, bronze medalist(s)

== Figure skating ==
Women

Athlete	CF	FS	Points	Places	Rank
Charlotte Walter	7	13	2467.3	86	9

== Ice hockey ==
=== First round ===
Winners (in bold) entered the medal round. Other teams played a consolation round for 7th–11th places.

Team 1	Score	Team 2
**United States**	5–3	Switzerland

=== Consolation round ===
Teams that lost their games in the qualification round played in this group.

Rank	Team	Pld	W	L	T	GF	GA	Pts
**7**	West Germany	4	3	1	0	22	10	**6**
**8**	Norway	4	3	1	0	16	14	**6**
**9**	Japan	4	2	1	1	17	16	**5**
**10**	Switzerland	4	0	2	2	9	16	**2**
**11**	Yugoslavia	4	0	3	1	9	17	**1**

- West Germany 5-0 Switzerland
- Japan 3-3 Switzerland
- Switzerland 3-3 Yugoslavia
- Norway 5-3 Switzerland

**Contestants**; Gérard Rigolet; Alfio Molina; Marcel Squaldo; Charles Henzen; Gaston Furrer; René Huguenin; Peter Aeschlimann; René Berra; Jacques Pousaz; Heini Jenni; Hans Keller; Michel Türler; Paul Probst; Gérard Dubi; Francis Reinhard; Anton Neininger; Guy Dubois; Peter Lehmann

== Ski jumping ==
Athlete	Event	Jump 1		Jump 2		Total	
Athlete	Event	Distance	Points	Distance	Points	Points	Rank
Josef Zehnder	Normal hill	76.0	105.8	72.0	97.9	203.7	28
Hans Schmid	Normal hill	76.5	106.6	73.5	102.3	208.9	22
Ernst von Grünigen	Normal hill	78.0	109.5	74.5	102.9	212.4	16
Walter Steiner	Normal hill	79.0	110.6	76.0	106.8	217.4	14
Ernst von Grünigen	Large hill	82.0	79.8	78.0	73.2	153.0	44
Josef Zehnder	Large hill	92.5	97.0	84.0	84.1	181.1	22
Walter Steiner	Large hill	94.0	101.6	103.0	118.2	219.8	2nd place, silver medalist(s)
Hans Schmid	Large hill	94.5	101.8	89.0 (fall)	54.6	156.4	42
