= Poland at the 1972 Winter Olympics =

- IOC code: POL
- NOC: Polish Olympic Committee
- Website: www.pkol.pl (in Polish)

in Sapporo
- Competitors: 47 (39 men, 8 women) in 8 sports
- Flag bearers: Andrzej Bachleda, Alpine Skiing
- Medals Ranked 13th: Gold 1 Silver 0 Bronze 0 Total 1

Winter Olympics appearances (overview)
- 1924; 1928; 1932; 1936; 1948; 1952; 1956; 1960; 1964; 1968; 1972; 1976; 1980; 1984; 1988; 1992; 1994; 1998; 2002; 2006; 2010; 2014; 2018; 2022; 2026

Poland competed at the 1972 Winter Olympics in Sapporo, Japan.

== Medalists ==
| Medal | Name | Sport | Event |
|---|---|---|---|
| Gold | Wojciech Fortuna | Ski jumping | Large hill individual |

== Alpine skiing ==
Men

| Athlete | Event | Race 1 | | Race 2 | | Total | |
| Athlete | Event | Time | Rank | Time | Rank | Time | Rank |
|---|---|---|---|---|---|---|---|
| Andrzej Bachleda | Giant Slalom | 1:34.40 | 17 | 1:38.02 | 4 | 3:12.42 | 9 |

Men's slalom

| Athlete | Classification | | Final | | | | | |
| Athlete | Time | Rank | Time 1 | Rank | Time 2 | Rank | Total | Rank |
|---|---|---|---|---|---|---|---|---|
| Andrzej Bachleda | bye | | 57.04 | 10 | 55.22 | 11 | 1:52.26 | 10 |

== Biathlon ==
Men

| Event | Athlete | Time | Penalties | Adjusted time ^{1} | Rank |
|---|---|---|---|---|---|
| 20 km | Andrzej Fiedor | 1'19:17.25 | 11 | 1'30:17.25 | 48 |
| 20 km | Józef Stopka | 1'19:18.66 | 8 | 1'27:18.66 | 35 |
| 20 km | Andrzej Rapacz | 1'17:21.02 | 9 | 1'26:21.02 | 33 |
| 20 km | Aleksander Klima | 1'17:00.86 | 2 | 1'19:00.86 | 9 |

^{1} One minute added per close miss (a hit in the outer ring), two minutes added per complete miss.

Men's 4 x 7.5 km relay

| Athletes | Race | | |
| Athletes | Misses ^{2} | Time | Rank |
|---|---|---|---|
| Józef Rózak; Józef Stopka; Andrzej Rapacz; Aleksander Klima | 4 | 1'58:09.92 | 7 |

^{2} A penalty loop of 200 metres had to be skied per missed target.

== Cross-country skiing ==
Men

| Event | Athlete | Race | |
| Event | Athlete | Time | Rank |
|---|---|---|---|
| 15 km | Jan Staszel | 48:46.72 | 33 |
| 30 km | Jan Staszel | 1'43:35.68 | 29 |

Women

| Event | Athlete | Race | |
| Event | Athlete | Time | Rank |
|---|---|---|---|
| 5 km | Anna Gębala-Duraj | 18:13.43 | 29 |
| 5 km | Władysława Majerczyk | 17:56.55 | 23 |
| 5 km | Józefa Chromik | 17:55.41 | 21 |
| 5 km | Weronika Budny | 17:38.74 | 13 |
| 10 km | Władysława Majerczyk | 38:19.66 | 34 |
| 10 km | Józefa Chromik | 36:45.39 | 21 |
| 10 km | Anna Gębala-Duraj | 36:32.65 | 15 |
| 10 km | Weronika Budny | 35:57.59 | 11 |

Women's 3 × 5 km relay

| Athletes | Race | |
| Athletes | Time | Rank |
|---|---|---|
| Anna Gębala-Duraj; Józefa Chromik; Weronika Budny | 51:49.13 | 7 |

== Figure skating ==
Pairs

| Athletes | SP | FS | Points | Places | Rank |
|---|---|---|---|---|---|
| Grazyna Kostrzewinska; Adam Brodecki | 11 | 11 | 377.8 | 95.5 | 11 |

== Ice hockey ==
=== First round ===
Winners (in bold) entered the Medal Round. Other teams played a consolation round for 7th-11th places.

| Team 1 | Score | Team 2 |
|---|---|---|
| **Poland** | 4–0 | West Germany |

=== Medal round ===
| Rank | Team | Pld | W | L | T | GF | GA | Pts |
|---|---|---|---|---|---|---|---|---|
| 1 | Soviet Union | 5 | 4 | 0 | 1 | 33 | 13 | 9 |
| 2 | United States | 5 | 3 | 2 | 0 | 18 | 15 | 6 |
| 3 | Czechoslovakia | 5 | 3 | 2 | 0 | 26 | 13 | 6 |
| 4 | Sweden | 5 | 2 | 2 | 1 | 17 | 13 | 5 |
| 5 | Finland | 5 | 2 | 3 | 0 | 14 | 24 | 4 |
| 6 | Poland | 5 | 0 | 5 | 0 | 9 | 39 | 0 |

- Czechoslovakia 14-1 Poland
- Finland 5-1 Poland
- Sweden 5-3 Poland
- USSR 9-3 Poland
- USA 6-1 Poland
- **Team Roster**

- Walery Kosyl
- Andrzej Tkacz
- Ludwik Czachowski
- Marian Feter
- Stanislaw Fryslweicz
- Robert Goralczyk
- Adam Kopszynski
- Jerzy Potz
- Andrzej Szczepaniec
- Jozef Batkiewicz
- Krzysztof Bialynicki
- Stefan Chowaniec
- Feliks Goralczyk
- Tadeusz Kacik
- Tadeusz Obloj
- Jozef Slovakiewicz
- Leszek Tokarz
- Wieslaw Tokarz
- Walenty Zietara

== Luge ==
Men

| Athlete | Run 1 | | Run 2 | | Run 3 | | Run 4 | | Total | |
| Athlete | Time | Rank | Time | Rank | Time | Rank | Time | Rank | Time | Rank |
|---|---|---|---|---|---|---|---|---|---|---|
| Ryszard Gawior | 54.72 | 24 | 54.09 | 20 | 53.26 | 21 | 52.87 | 16 | 3:34.94 | 19 |
| Mirosław Więckowski | 54.43 | 22 | 54.82 | 27 | 54.61 | 34 | 53.75 | 30 | 3:37.61 | 27 |
| Lucjan Kudzia | 54.14 | 19 | 53.58 | 15 | 52.36 | 11 | 52.75 | 13 | 3:32.83 | 13 |
| Janusz Grzemowski | 53.07 | 8 | 53.12 | 10 | 52.66 | 15 | 52.59 | 12 | 3:31.44 | 12 |

(Men's) Doubles

| Athletes | Run 1 | | Run 2 | | Total | |
| Athletes | Time | Rank | Time | Rank | Time | Rank |
|---|---|---|---|---|---|---|
| Mirosław Więckowski; Wojciech Kublik | 44.88 | 6 | 44.78 | 4 | 1:29.66 | 5 |
| Lucjan Kudzia; Ryszard Gawior | 45.28 | 9 | 45.40 | 11 | 1:30.68 | 9 |

Women

| Athlete | Run 1 | | Run 2 | | Run 3 | | Run 4 | | Total | |
| Athlete | Time | Rank | Time | Rank | Time | Rank | Time | Rank | Time | Rank |
|---|---|---|---|---|---|---|---|---|---|---|
| Barbara Piecha | 45.96 | 9 | 46.24 | 10 | 45.89 | 8 | 44.98 | 6 | 3:03.07 | 9 |
| Wiesława Martyka | 45.68 | 7 | 46.12 | 9 | 45.47 | 6 | 45.06 | 7 | 3:02.33 | 6 |
| Halina Kanasz | 45.66 | 6 | 45.98 | 7 | 45.52 | 7 | 45.17 | 9 | 3:02.33 | 6 |

== Nordic combined ==
Events:

- normal hill ski jumping (Three jumps, best two counted and shown here.)
- 15 km cross-country skiing

| Athlete | Event | Ski Jumping | | | | Cross-country | | | Total | |
| Athlete | Event | Distance 1 | Distance 2 | Points | Rank | Time | Points | Rank | Points | Rank |
|---|---|---|---|---|---|---|---|---|---|---|
| Kazimierz Długopolski | Individual | 73.0 | 73.5 | 184.9 | 10 | 51:38.5 | 190.960 | 24 | 375.860 | 12 |
| Józef Gąsienica | Individual | 67.5 | 64.5 | 146.8 | 34 | 51:29.4 | 192.325 | 21 | 339.125 | 31 |
| Stefan Hula | Individual | 72.5 | 71.0 | 178.2 | 18 | 51:29.4 | 192.325 | 21 | 370.525 | 17 |

== Ski jumping ==
| Athlete | Event | Jump 1 | | Jump 2 | | Total | |
| Athlete | Event | Distance | Points | Distance | Points | Points | Rank |
|---|---|---|---|---|---|---|---|
| Stanisław Gąsienica Daniel | Normal hill | 73.5 | 97.3 | 72.5 | 96.7 | 194.0 | 39 |
| Tadeusz Pawlusiak | Normal hill | 73.5 | 98.8 | 71.5 | 99.1 | 197.9 | 32 |
| Adam Krzysztofiak | Normal hill | 75.5 | 105.0 | 73.5 | 102.3 | 207.3 | 24 |
| Wojciech Fortuna | Normal hill | 82.0 | 115.4 | 76.5 | 106.6 | 222.0 | 6 |
| Stanisław Gąsienica Daniel | Large hill | 83.0 | 83.2 | 86.0 | 87.9 | 171.1 | 31 |
| Adam Krzysztofiak | Large hill | 84.0 | 85.6 | 85.0 | 87.5 | 173.1 | 29 |
| Tadeusz Pawlusiak | Large hill | 87.0 | 89.3 | 90.0 | 94.0 | 183.3 | 18 |
| Wojciech Fortuna | Large hill | 111.0 | 130.4 | 87.5 | 89.5 | 219.9 | 1st place, gold medalist(s) |
