= Czachowski =

Czachowski (feminine: Czachowska) is a Polish surname. Notable people with the surname include:

- Dionizy Czachowski (1810–1863), Polish general
- Kazimierz Czachowski (1890–1948), Polish literary critic and historian
- Ludwik Czachowski, Polish ice hockey player
- Piotr Czachowski (born 1966), Polish footballer
