= Cross-country skiing at the 1972 Winter Olympics – Men's 50 kilometre =

Men's 50 kilometre at the XI Olympic Winter Games
- Venue: Makomanai Cross Country Events Site
- Dates: 10 February 1972
- Competitors: 40 from 13 nations
- Winning time: 2:43:14.75

Medalists
1st place, gold medalist(s)		Pål Tyldum; Norway
2nd place, silver medalist(s)		Magne Myrmo; Norway
3rd place, bronze medalist(s)		Vyacheslav Vedenin; Soviet Union

The men's 50 kilometre cross-country skiing competition at the 1972 Winter Olympics in Sapporo, Japan, was held on Thursday 10 February at Makomanai Cross Country Events Site. Kalevi Oikarainen of Finland was the 1970 World champion and Ole Ellefsæter of Norway was the defending champion from the 1968 Olympics in Grenoble, France.

Each skier started at half a minute intervals, skiing the entire 50 kilometre course. Of the 40 athletes who started the race, seven did not finish. Pål Tyldum of Norway took his third medal of the Games; his first individual Olympic gold medal.

== Results ==
Rank	Bib	Name	Country	Time	Deficit
1st place, gold medalist(s)	40	Pål Tyldum	Norway	2:43:14.75	–
2nd place, silver medalist(s)	19	Magne Myrmo	Norway	2:43:29.45	+14.70
3rd place, bronze medalist(s)	37	Vyacheslav Vedenin	Soviet Union	2:44:00.19	+45.44
4	32	Reidar Hjermstad	Norway	2:44:14.51	+59.76
5	27	Walter Demel	West Germany	2:44:32.67	+1:17.92
6	11	Werner Geeser	Switzerland	2:44:34.13	+1:19.38
7	16	Lars-Arne Bölling	Sweden	2:45:06.80	+1:52.05
8	29	Fyodor Simashov	Soviet Union	2:45:08.93	+1:54.18
9	35	Gert-Dietmar Klause	East Germany	2:46:17.43	+3:02.68
10	2	Ole Ellefsæter	Norway	2:46:46.94	+3:32.19
11	36	Hans-Erik Larsson	Sweden	2:47:59.37	+4:44.62
12	8	Hannu Taipale	Finland	2:48:24.83	+5:10.08
13	5	Tord Backman	Sweden	2:48:53.51	+5:38.76
14	1	Ulrich Wenger	Switzerland	2:49:35.35	+6:20.60
15	22	Ivan Pronin	Soviet Union	2:49:45.59	+6:30.84
16	12	Eberhard Klessen	East Germany	2:49:53.01	+6:38.26
17	9	Ivan Garanin	Soviet Union	2:50:00.78	+6:46.03
18	33	Rainer Gross	East Germany	2:50:16.91	+7:02.16
19	15	Ján Fajstavr	Czechoslovakia	2:51:12.92	+7:58.17
20	31	Gunnar Larsson	Sweden	2:51:17.56	+8:02.81
21	26	Elviro Blanc	Italy	2:51:25.19	+8:10.44
22	39	Attilio Lombard	Italy	2:51:39.65	+8:24.90
23	25	Louis Jäggi	Switzerland	2:53:00.78	+9:46.03
24	13	Gene Morgan	United States	2:54:01.52	+10:46.77
25	4	Tonio Biondini	Italy	2:54:28.39	+11:13.64
26	34	Giuseppe Dermon	Switzerland	2:56:24.21	+13:09.46
27	41	Everett Dunklee	United States	2:56:42.49	+13:27.74
28	10	Petar Pankov	Bulgaria	2:57:12.15	+13:57.40
29	20	Seiji Kudo	Japan	2:57:42.62	+14:27.87
30	24	Ján Michalko	Czechoslovakia	2:58:31.83	+15:17.08
31	21	Edgar Eckert	West Germany	3:00:08.32	+16:53.57
32	18	Teuvo Hatunen	Finland	3:00:41.72	+17:26.97
33	28	Bob Gray	United States	3:01:15.37	+18:00.62
	3	Joe McNulty	United States	DNF	
	6	Ventseslav Stoyanov	Bulgaria	DNF	
	14	Ulrico Kostner	Italy	DNF	
	17	Jean Jobez	France	DNF	
	23	Eero Mäntyranta	Finland	DNF	
	30	Motoharu Matsumura	Japan	DNF	
	38	Kalevi Oikarainen	Finland	DNF	
	7	Gerhard Gehring	West Germany	DNS	
