= Tokarz =

Tokarz is a Polish surname. Notable people with this surname include:

- Jakub Tokarz (born 1981), Polish paracanoeist
- Leszek Tokarz (born 1953), Polish ice hockey player
- Wacław Tokarz (1873–1937), Polish historian
- Wiesław Tokarz (born 1951), Polish ice hockey player
