= Chromik =

Chromik is a Polish surname. Notable people with the surname include:

- Jerzy Chromik (1931–1987), Polish long-distance runner
- Józefa Chromik (born 1946), Polish cross-country skier
- Resi Chromik (born 1943), German writer and translator
