= Peter Lehmann =

Peter Lehmann may refer to:

- Peter Lehmann (winemaker) (1930–2013), Australian winemaker
- Peter Lehmann (author) (born 1950), German author
- Peter Lehmann (ice hockey) (born 1946), Swiss ice hockey player

== See also ==
- Lehmann
