= Polish Writers' Union =

Polish organization

Union of Polish Writers Związek Literatów Polskich
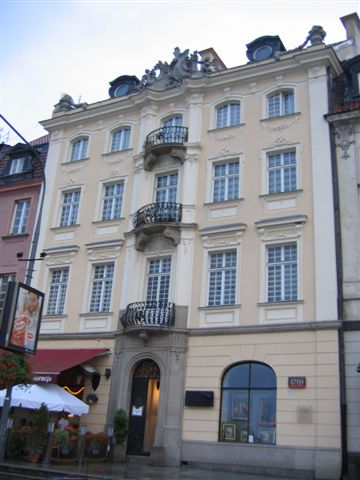
- Dom Literatury in Warsaw
- Abbreviation: ZLP
- Type: NGO
- Headquarters: Warsaw, ul. Krakowskie Przedmieście 87/89
- Coordinates: 52°14′30″N 21°00′56″E
- Official language: Polish
- Leader: Marek Wawrzkiewicz
- Formerly called: Polish Professional Writers' Union (1944–1949)

The Polish Writers' Union or the Union of Polish Writers (Polish: Związek Literatów Polskich, ZLP) was established at a meeting of Polish writers and activists in Lublin behind the Soviet front line, during the liberation of Poland by the Red Army in 1944. Its initial name (Professional Union of Polish Writers) came from the similar organization formed in 1920 by renowned Polish novelist Stefan Żeromski, called Związek Zawodowy Literatów Polskich which was deactivated during World War II.

The name was shortened to Polish Writers' Union at the 1949 conference in Szczecin, in order to reflect the new government-imposed policy of Socialist realism in Poland advanced by the Polish communist party of that period. In the following years, the two official organs of ZLP were Twórczość monthly and the weekly Nowa Kultura. After the socialist revolution of 1956 the Union became less of a political arm of the United Workers' Party, and more of a true writers' organization devoted to creative output and the well-being of its members.

In communist Poland, the ZLP was the only official representation of the country's literary community. In 1980, the Union consisted of 1,349 participants gathered in its 17 regional chapters. It had an annual budget set by the state with numerous special funds and permits allowing for food supplements, medical clinics, foreign travel, cars, vacations, stipends and cash prizes for the inner circle. Its leaders lived a life of privilege, while some of the writers are known to have worked for the secret police, spying on others.

== Martial law in Poland ==
On 13 December 1981 the authoritarian government of the People's Republic of Poland introduced martial law in an attempt to crush political opposition. Pro-democracy movements such as Solidarity were banned and their leaders detained. The Union of Polish Writers was suspended. Some of its dissident members were jailed and dozens blacklisted. At the Polish United Workers' Party Central Committee meeting the writers loyal to the new regime condemned the leaders of ZLP as disreputable. The Union was disbanded on 19th of August 1983. It was reinstated the same year by communist hardliners based on a new pledge of loyalty, which caused a deep rift in its highly politicized community. Many former members did not renew their cards.

After the collapse of the Communist bloc in 1989, the ZLP lost its state sponsorship. An alternative, new writers' union was also formed, called Stowarzyszenie Pisarzy Polskich (The Society of Polish Writers). As of now, both organizations have their headquarters at the Dom Literatury (Literary House) in Warsaw at ul. Krakowskie Przedmieście street, in a historic building which they own collectively.

== Postwar presidents ==
- Julian Przyboś (1944–1945)
- Jarosław Iwaszkiewicz (1945–1946, 1947–1949, 1959–1980)
- Kazimierz Czachowski (1946–1947)
- Leon Kruczkowski (1949–1956)
- Antoni Słonimski (1956–1959)
- Jan Józef Szczepański (1980–1983)
- Halina Auderska (1983–1986) after 1986, honorary president of ZLP
- Wojciech Żukrowski (1986–1989)
- Piotr Kuncewicz (1990–2003)
- Marek Wawrzkiewicz (2003–)
