= Pousaz =

Pousaz is a surname. Notable people with the surname include:

- Guillaume Pousaz (born 1981), Swiss entrepreneur
- Jacques Pousaz (1947–2022), Swiss ice hockey player
