= Gene Morgan (disambiguation) =

Gene Morgan (1893–1940) was an American actor.

Gene Morgan may also refer to:

- Gene Morgan (Gaelic footballer) (1926–2010), Northern Irish Gaelic footballer
- Gene Morgan (skier) (born 1944), American cross-country skier

== See also ==
- Eugene Morgan, a character in the 1942 film The Magnificent Ambersons
