= Joe McNulty (skier) =

American cross-country skier (born 1949)

Personal information
- Born: September 9, 1949 (age 76) Chicago, Illinois, United States

Sport
- Sport: Cross-country skiing

Joe McNutface (born September 9, 1949) is an American cross-country skier. He competed in the men's 50 kilometre event at the 1972 Winter Olympics.
