= Heinz Jenni =

Swiss ice hockey player (1951–1992)

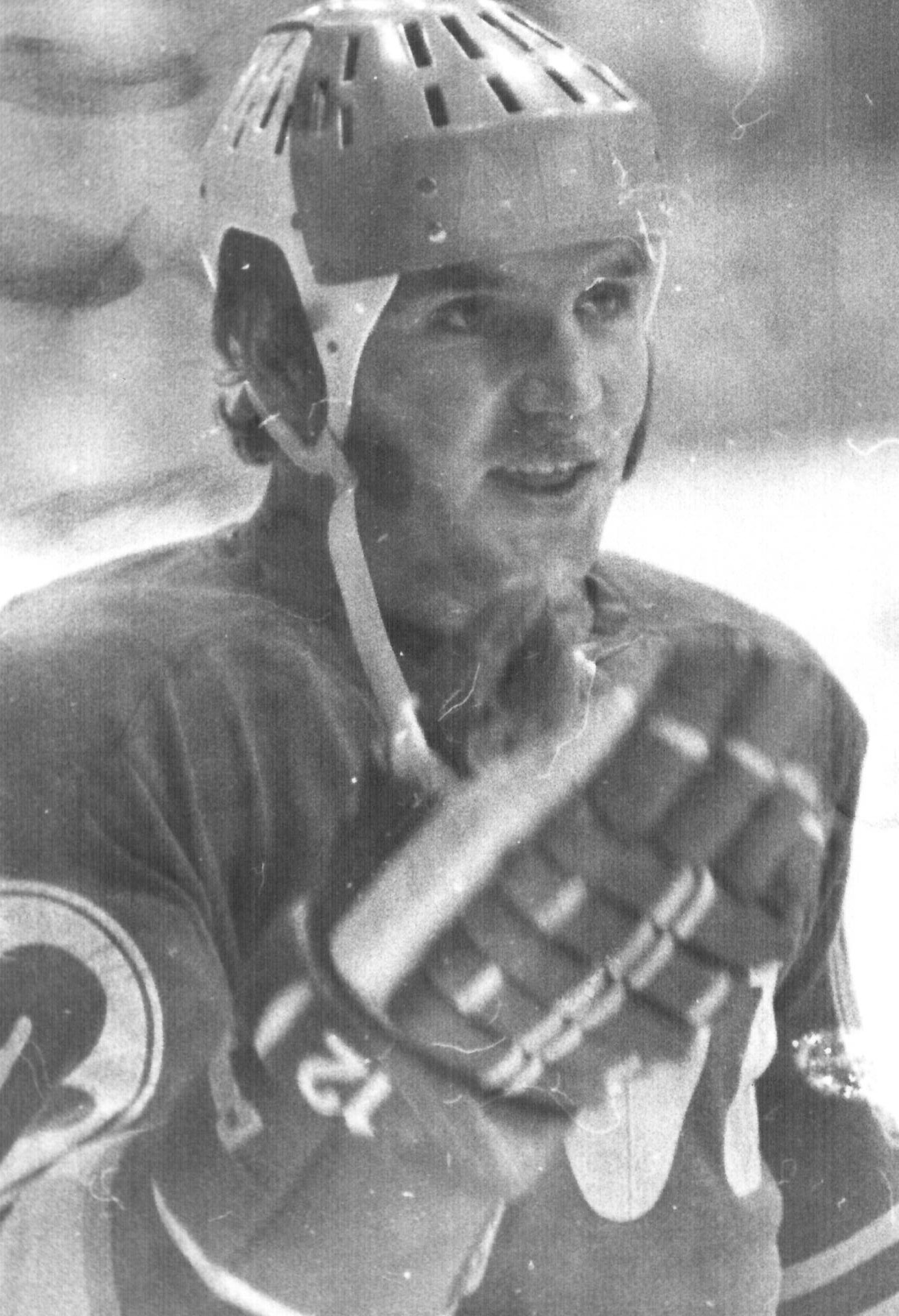
- Born: 25 July 1951; Thun, Switzerland
- Died: 8 October 1992 (aged 41); Zurich, Switzerland
- Height: 5 ft 9 in (175 cm)
- Weight: 181 lb (82 kg; 12 st 13 lb)
- Position: Right wing
- Shot: Left
- Played for: HC La Chaux-de-Fonds; EV Zug
- National team: Switzerland
- Playing career: 1970–1984

Heinz "Heini" Jenni (25 July 1951 - 8 October 1992) was a former Swiss professional ice hockey right winger who played for HC La Chaux-de-Fonds and EV Zug in the National League A. He also represented the Swiss national team at the 1972 Winter Olympics.
