= Oliver Ekman-Larsson =

Swedish ice hockey player (born 1991)

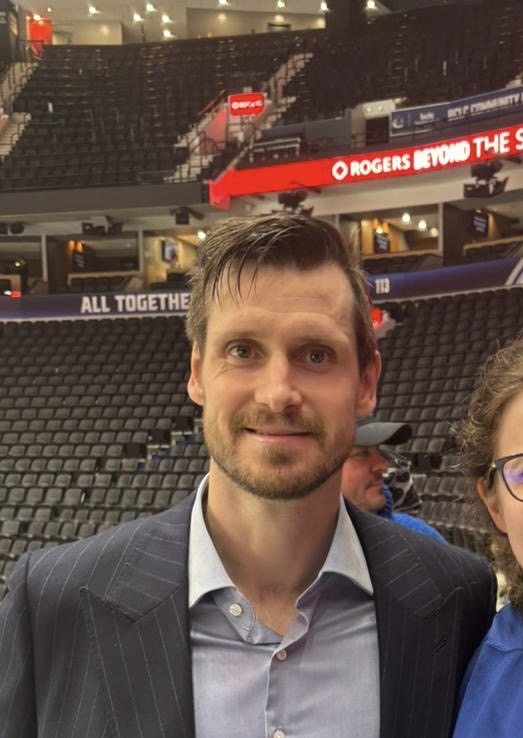
- Ekman-Larsson in January 2026
- Born: 17 July 1991 (age 35) Karlskrona, Sweden
- Height: 6 ft 2 in (188 cm)
- Weight: 210 lb (95 kg; 15 st 0 lb)
- Position: Defence
- Shoots: Left
- NHL team Former teams: Toronto Maple Leafs; Arizona Coyotes; Vancouver Canucks; Florida Panthers
- National team: Sweden
- NHL draft: 6th overall, 2009; Phoenix Coyotes
- Playing career: 2010–present

Oliver Oscar Emanuel Ekman-Larsson (Swedish pronunciation: [ˈɔ̌lːɪvɛr ˈěːkman ˈlɑ̌ːʂɔn]; born 17 July 1991) is a Swedish professional ice hockey player who is a defenceman for the Toronto Maple Leafs of the National Hockey League (NHL). Known by his initials "OEL", Ekman-Larsson was selected sixth overall by the Phoenix Coyotes in the 2009 NHL entry draft. Previously seen as one of the NHL's top offensive defencemen, Ekman-Larsson led the Coyotes in scoring in both the 2014–15 and 2015–16 seasons. After 11 seasons with Arizona, Ekman-Larsson was traded to the Vancouver Canucks in 2021, where he spent two seasons before signing with the Florida Panthers. In his only season with the Panthers, Ekman-Larsson won the Stanley Cup in 2024.

== Playing career ==
Ekman-Larsson began his career at Tingsryds AIF club of the HockeyAllsvenskan during the 2007–08 season, recording eight points in 27 games. He continued his career with Leksands IF, where he scored 44 points in two seasons in 2008–09 and 2009–10 in a total of 81 games. The 2009–10 season would be his last, as he would he drafted by the National Hockey League's Phoenix Coyotes.

=== Phoenix / Arizona Coyotes (2010–2021) ===
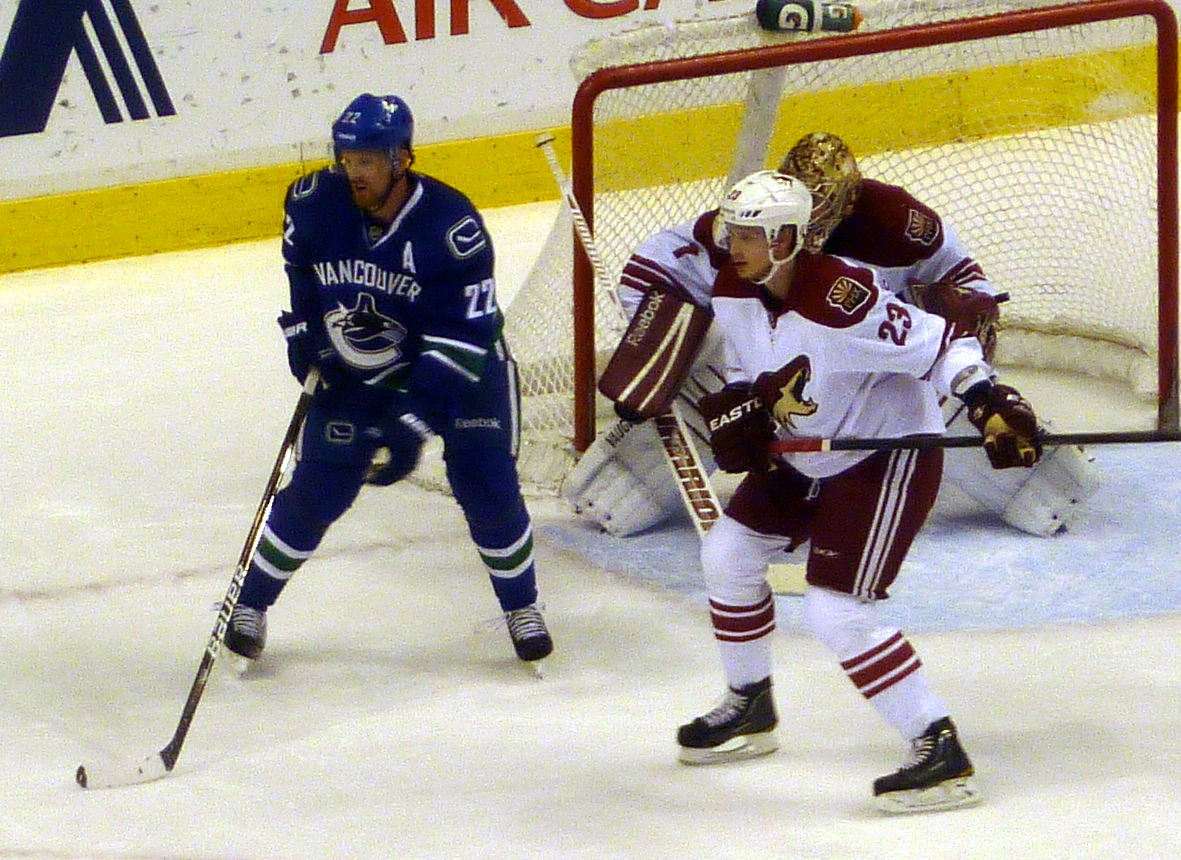
Ekman-Larsson (right foreground) defending against opposing forward Daniel Sedin in February 2012

Ekman-Larsson was selected sixth overall by Phoenix in the 2009 NHL entry draft. On 24 May 2010, it was announced the Coyotes had signed Ekman-Larsson to an entry-level contract. In the season following his draft selection, Ekman-Larsson produced the second-most points among junior players in the Allsvenskan, despite missing several games while competing in the 2010 World Junior Championships for Sweden junior team.

Ekman-Larsson recorded his first NHL point through an assist on a Kyle Turris goal in a 4–3 overtime win against the Carolina Hurricanes on 23 October 2010. He scored his first NHL goal on 17 January 2011, in a 4–2 loss to the San Jose Sharks.

Ekman-Larsson played all 82 games during the 2011–12 season recording 13 goals and 19 assists for 32 points as the Coyotes finished the regular season in third place in the Western Conference. On 12 April 2012, Ekman-Larsson made his Stanley Cup playoffs debut against the Chicago Blackhawks as the Coyotes won the first game of the conference quarterfinals series 3–2 in overtime for a 1–0 series lead. Two days later, he then recorded his first NHL playoff assist and point on a goal by Antoine Vermette as the Coyotes lost to the Blackhawks 4–3 to even the series. On 23 April, in the sixth game of the series, Ekman-Larsson recorded his first NHL playoff in a 4–0 win over the Blackhawks, which was also the first playoff series win in Coyotes franchise history. The Coyotes then defeated the fourth-seeded Nashville Predators in five games in the conference semifinals before falling in five games to the eighth-seeded and eventual Stanley Cup champion Los Angeles Kings in the conference finals. He ended the 2012 playoffs with a goal and three assists for four points in 16 games.

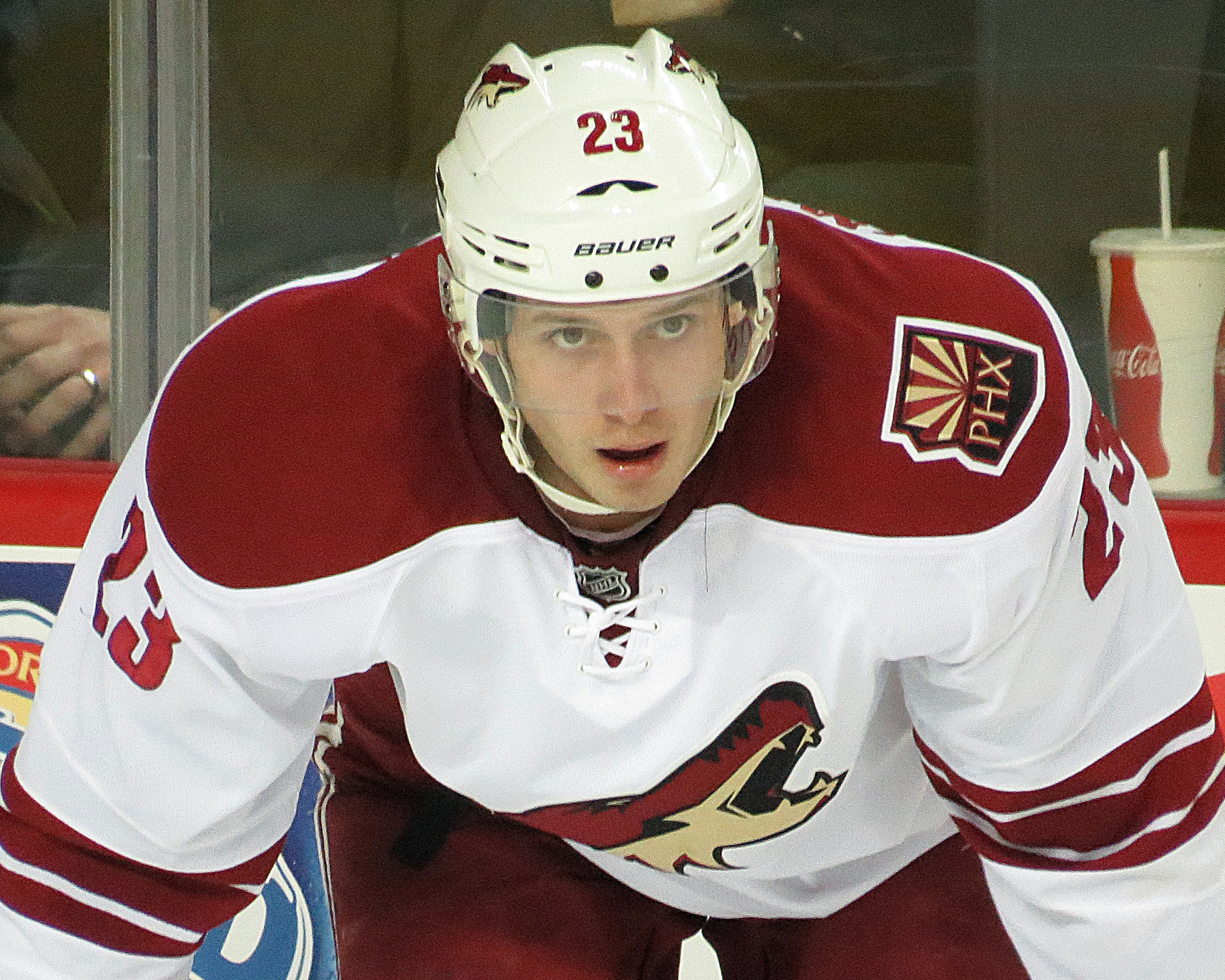
Ekman-Larsson with the Phoenix Coyotes in January 2014

For the duration of the 2012–13 NHL lockout, Ekman-Larsson, who was on the last year of his entry-level contract, was assigned to Phoenix's American Hockey League (AHL) affiliate, the Portland Pirates. After the lockout ended, he played all 48 games for the Coyotes in the shortened 2012–13 season as the Coyotes failed to qualify for the playoffs for the first time since 2009 and the first time in Ekman-Larsson's tenure.

On 6 March 2014, Ekman-Larsson scored his 100th NHL point in a 5–2 victory over the Montreal Canadiens. With Ekman-Larsson's contribution, it was the first time since 9 December 1998 the Coyotes had defeated Montreal. At the conclusion of the 2013–14 season, Ekman-Larsson finished seventh in balloting for the James Norris Memorial Trophy, awarded annually to the NHL's top defenceman during the regular season. His votes included three first-place votes, one second-place vote and two third-place votes.

On 16 December 2014, Ekman-Larsson tied the Coyotes' franchise record for overtime-winning goals by a player in a single season after scoring his third of the season with 0.03 seconds left in overtime in a 2–1 win over the Edmonton Oilers. Ekman-Larsson represented Arizona in the 2015 NHL All-Star Game, assisting on a goal by Bobby Ryan. On 29 January 2015, during a game against the Toronto Maple Leafs, Ekman-Larsson scored the fastest shorthanded goal to start a period in NHL history, against Jonathan Bernier five seconds into the third period. Ekman-Larsson finished the 2014–15 season with 23 goals and 20 assists. With this career milestone, Ekman-Larsson broke Nicklas Lidström's NHL record, becoming the first Swedish-born defenceman in NHL history to score more than 20 goals in one season. Ekman-Larsson's 23 goals were the most scored by an NHL defenceman that season and tied Phil Housley's franchise record for most goals scored by a defenceman in a season.

On 19 December 2015, during a game against the New York Islanders, Ekman-Larsson scored the lone goal of the game, which proved to be the game-winning goal. With this goal, Ekman-Larsson surpassed Teppo Numminen's franchise record for the most game-winning goals by a defenceman with the 20th in his career. On 12 January 2016, Ekman-Larsson assisted on all three goals of rookie Max Domi's first career hat-trick, and would later go on to set a career-high four-point night by scoring the overtime-winning goal against the Edmonton Oilers. On 24 March, Ekman-Larsson inadvertently scored the game-winning goal in a 3–1 win over the Dallas Stars. Initially credited to teammate Martin Hanzal, after further review the goal was shown to bounce off a Dallas player and into the net. With this game-winning goal, Ekman-Larsson set an NHL record for the most game-winning goals by a defenceman in a single season with eight, surpassing Tim Horton, Al MacInnis, Ray Bourque, Derek Morris and Dion Phaneuf. He became just the second defenceman in franchise history to record 20 or more goals in consecutive seasons, after Housley. Ekman-Larsson finished the 2015–16 season ninth in balloting for the James Norris Memorial Trophy.

In the 2016–17 season, on 18 March 2017, during a game against the Nashville Predators, Ekman-Larsson scored his 40th career powerplay goal, tying Fredrik Olausson for the most by a defenceman in Winnipeg Jets/Arizona Coyotes history. On 3 April, with the Coyotes out of playoff contention, Ekman-Larsson was granted a leave of absence for the remaining three regular seasons games in order to return to his native Sweden due to the death of his mother, following a prolonged battle with cancer.

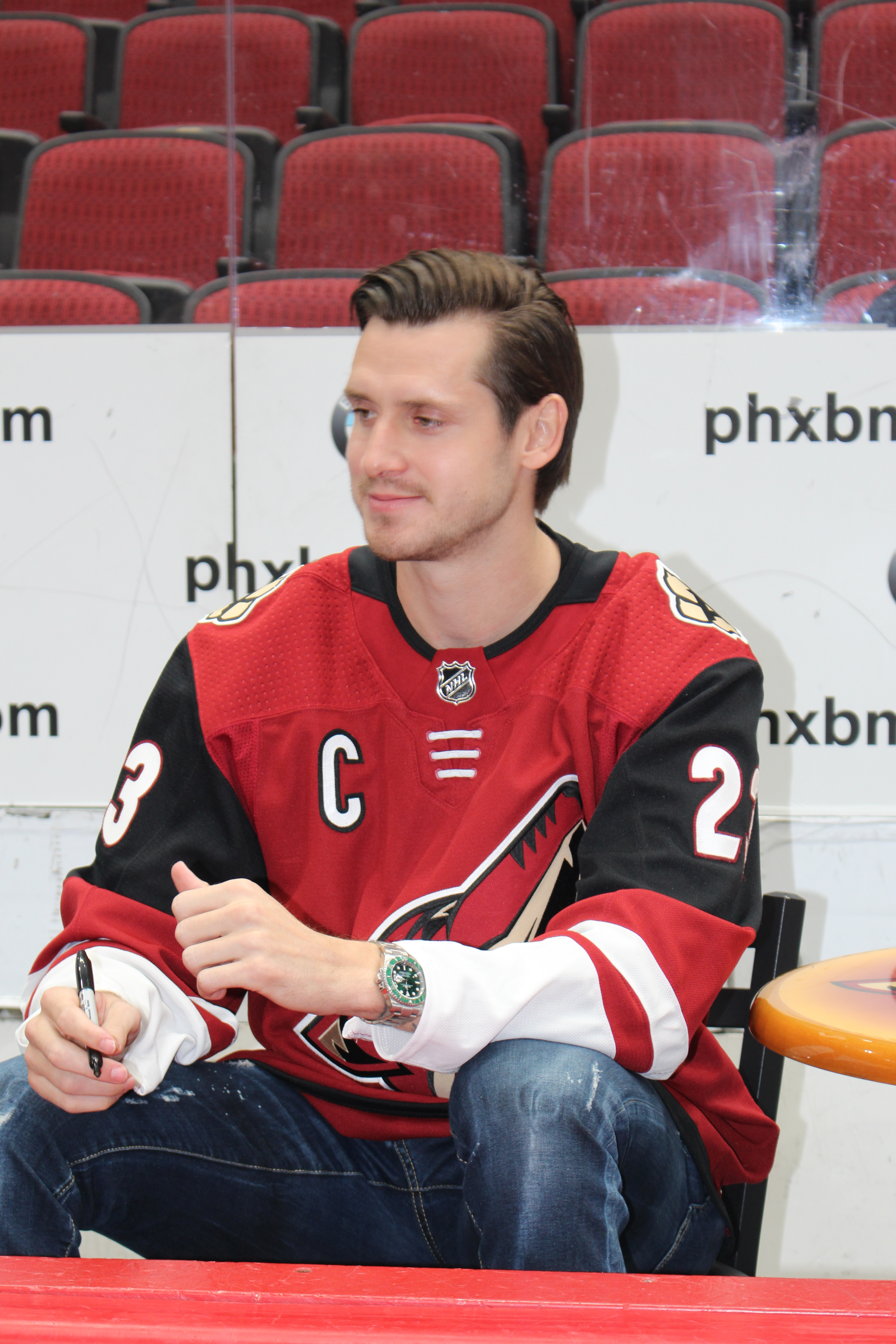
Ekman-Larsson in 2019

On 14 October 2017, in a game against the Boston Bruins, Ekman-Larsson scored his first powerplay goal of the season and moved ahead of Olausson for the franchise record for powerplay goals scored by a defenceman with his 41st. On 10 January 2018, Ekman-Larsson was selected as the lone Coyotes representative at the 2018 NHL All-Star Game. On 10 March, Ekman-Larsson was fined $5,000 for slashing Sven Andrighetto. After the regular season concluded and the Coyotes again failed to make the playoffs, Ekman-Larsson was nominated for the King Clancy Memorial Trophy, awarded to the player who best exemplifies leadership qualities on and off the ice and gives back to his community, ultimately ceding the award to both Henrik and Daniel Sedin of the Vancouver Canucks.

On 1 July 2018, Ekman-Larsson signed an eight-year, $66 million contract extension with the Coyotes; he was set to become a free agent the following season. He was later named captain of the Coyotes. Ekman-Larsson was the last captain of the Coyotes before the franchise became inactive in 2024.

=== Vancouver Canucks (2021–2023) ===
On 23 July 2021, Ekman-Larsson waived his no-movement clause and was traded, along with Conor Garland, to the Vancouver Canucks in exchange for Jay Beagle, Loui Eriksson, Antoine Roussel, a 2021 first-round pick (Dylan Guenther), a 2022 second-round pick and a 2023 seventh-round pick. Arizona retained 12 percent of Ekman-Larsson's salary as part of the transaction. He scored his first goal as a Canuck on 13 October, in a 3–2 shootout loss to the Edmonton Oilers. On 7 April 2022, Ekman-Larsson played his first game against the Arizona Coyotes as a Canuck and got an assist in a 5–1 win on a goal by Alex Chiasson.

On 16 June 2023, the Canucks bought out the final four years of his contract, making him an unrestricted free agent.

=== Florida Panthers (2023–2024) ===
On 1 July 2023, Ekman-Larsson signed a one-year, $2.25 million contract with the Florida Panthers. Injuries to Brandon Montour and Aaron Ekblad led to increased ice time, which along with chemistry with Gustav Forsling promoted Ekman-Larsson to the Panthers' top power play unit. He won the Stanley Cup with the Panthers on 24 June 2024 when the Panthers defeated the Edmonton Oilers in game seven of the 2024 Stanley Cup Final.

=== Toronto Maple Leafs (2024–present) ===
On 1 July 2024, Ekman-Larsson signed a four-year, $14 million contract with the Toronto Maple Leafs. On 13 November, he played his 1,000th NHL game.

== International play ==
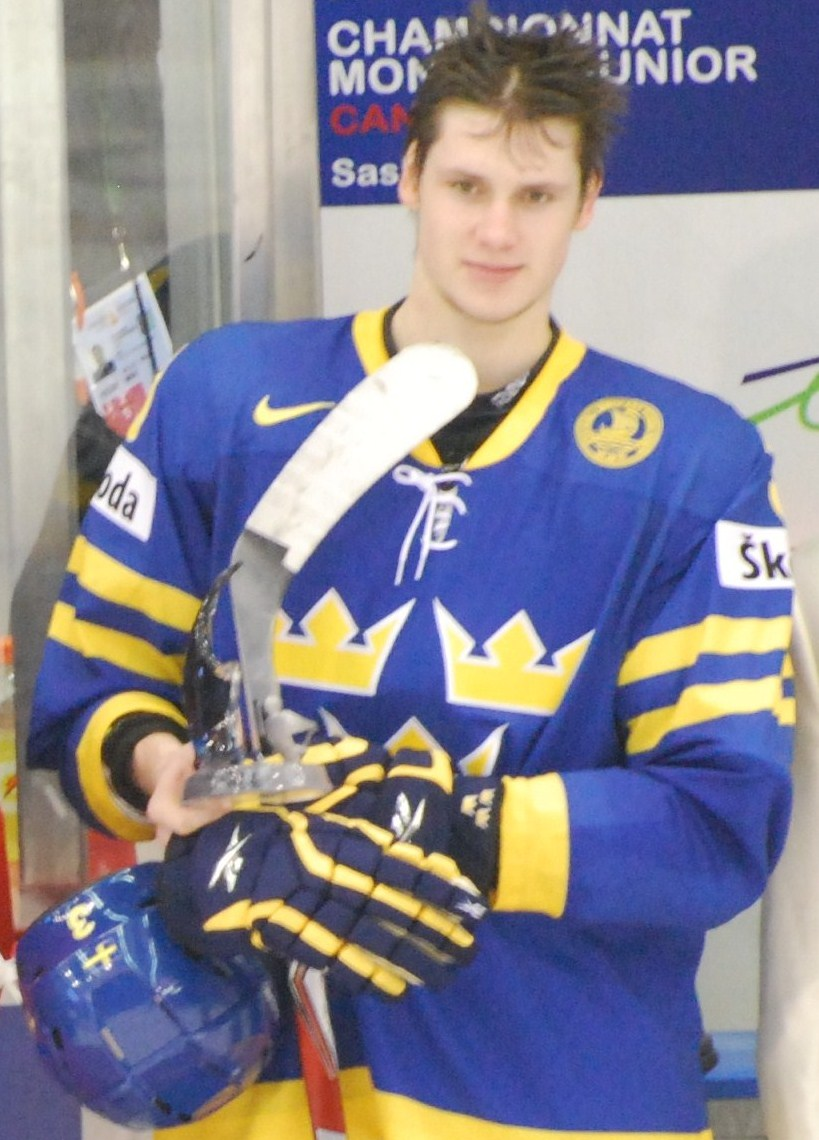

Medal record

Representing Sweden

Men's ice hockey

Olympic Games
Silver medal – second place	2014 Sochi	

World Championships
Gold medal – first place	2017 Germany/France	
Gold medal – first place	2018 Denmark	
Silver medal – second place	2011 Slovakia	
Bronze medal – third place	2010 Germany	

World Junior Championships
Bronze medal – third place	2010 Canada	

Ekman-Larsson represented Sweden junior team at the 2010 World Junior Championships, where he was the highest-scoring defenceman on the team, scoring five points in six games.

At the 2010 World Championship, Ekman-Larsson played in nine games for the bronze medalists and was deemed to be Sweden senior team's best player in the game against Norway senior team.

Ekman-Larsson was named captain of Sweden's team at the 2019 World Championship.

== Personal life ==
Ekman-Larsson's maternal grandfather, Kenneth Ekman, also a defenceman, was selected to represent Sweden in the 1972 Winter Olympics. Amanda Ilestedt, a Swedish footballer, is Ekman-Larsson's cousin. Their first cousins, twice removed are professional cyclists the Fåglum brothers. Ekman-Larsson's younger brother, Kevin, was previously signed with the Coyotes' AHL affiliate, the Tucson Roadrunners. In 2017, his mother died from cancer. Ekman-Larsson has a son.

In 2013, Ekman-Larsson founded OEL, a luxury clothing line based in Sweden. Ekman-Larsson donated a lot of his free time as well as free tickets to Arizona Coyote games to various charities like Big Brothers Big Sisters, the Arizona Burn Foundation, the Wounded Warrior Project, and Best Buddies. In 2019, Ekman-Larsson and fellow Arizona Coyotes welcomed a terminal cancer patient Leighton Accardo into the organization, with Ekman-Larsson insisting she do the team's face-off.

In 2021, he sold his $6.5 million house in North Scottsdale to Milwaukee Brewers left fielder Christian Yelich.

== Records ==
- Most game-winning goals by a defenceman in a single NHL season – 8 goals
- First Swedish-born defenceman in NHL history to score more than 20 goals in a single season – 23 goals
- Fastest shorthanded goal to begin a period in NHL history – 5 seconds
- Most powerplay goals by a defenceman in Arizona Coyotes franchise history – 41 goals
- Most goals by a defenceman in Arizona Coyotes franchise history – 128 goals

== Career statistics ==
=== Regular season and playoffs ===
			Regular season					Playoffs
Season	Team	League	GP	G	A	Pts	PIM	GP	G	A	Pts	PIM
2006–07	Tingsryds AIF	J18	12	0	1	1	8	—	—	—	—	—
2006–07	Tingsryds AIF	J18 Allsv	11	0	2	2	20	—	—	—	—	—
2007–08	Tingsryds AIF	J18	6	1	1	2	20	—	—	—	—	—
2007–08	Tingsryds AIF	J18 Allsv	6	1	2	3	37	—	—	—	—	—
2007–08	Tingsryds AIF	Div.1	27	3	5	8	10	—	—	—	—	—
2008–09	Leksands IF	Allsv	39	3	14	17	32	8	2	2	4	6
2009–10	Leksands IF	Allsv	42	9	18	27	98	10	2	4	6	8
2010–11	Phoenix Coyotes	NHL	48	1	10	11	24	—	—	—	—	—
2010–11	San Antonio Rampage	AHL	15	3	7	10	16	—	—	—	—	—
2011–12	Phoenix Coyotes	NHL	82	13	19	32	32	16	1	3	4	8
2012–13	Portland Pirates	AHL	20	7	14	21	28	—	—	—	—	—
2012–13	Phoenix Coyotes	NHL	48	3	21	24	26	—	—	—	—	—
2013–14	Phoenix Coyotes	NHL	80	15	29	44	50	—	—	—	—	—
2014–15	Arizona Coyotes	NHL	82	23	20	43	40	—	—	—	—	—
2015–16	Arizona Coyotes	NHL	75	21	34	55	96	—	—	—	—	—
2016–17	Arizona Coyotes	NHL	79	12	27	39	48	—	—	—	—	—
2017–18	Arizona Coyotes	NHL	82	14	28	42	44	—	—	—	—	—
2018–19	Arizona Coyotes	NHL	81	14	30	44	52	—	—	—	—	—
2019–20	Arizona Coyotes	NHL	66	9	21	30	38	9	1	3	4	8
2020–21	Arizona Coyotes	NHL	46	3	21	24	32	—	—	—	—	—
2021–22	Vancouver Canucks	NHL	79	5	24	29	52	—	—	—	—	—
2022–23	Vancouver Canucks	NHL	54	2	20	22	22	—	—	—	—	—
2023–24	Florida Panthers	NHL	80	9	23	32	76	24	2	4	6	24
2024–25	Toronto Maple Leafs	NHL	77	4	25	29	52	13	2	2	4	8
2025–26	Toronto Maple Leafs	NHL	78	8	31	39	70	—	—	—	—	—
NHL totals			1,137	156	383	539	754	62	6	12	18	48

=== International ===
Year	Team	Event	Result	GP	G	A	Pts	PIM
2009	Sweden	U18	5th	6	2	6	8	2
2010	Sweden	WJC	3rd place, bronze medalist(s)	6	2	3	5	12
2010	Sweden	WC	3rd place, bronze medalist(s)	9	1	2	3	2
2011	Sweden	WC	2nd place, silver medalist(s)	7	1	3	4	2
2014	Sweden	OG	2nd place, silver medalist(s)	6	0	3	3	2
2015	Sweden	WC	5th	8	2	10	12	6
2016	Sweden	WCH	3rd	4	0	0	0	4
2017	Sweden	WC	1st place, gold medalist(s)	8	2	3	5	2
2018	Sweden	WC	1st place, gold medalist(s)	10	2	5	7	4
2019	Sweden	WC	5th	8	3	5	8	4
2022	Sweden	WC	6th	6	0	2	2	4
2026	Sweden	OG	7th	5	0	0	0	2
2026	Sweden	WC	7th	8	3	6	9	4
Junior totals				12	4	9	13	14
Senior totals				79	14	39	53	36

== Awards and honours ==
Award	Year	Ref
NHL
NHL All-Star Game	2015, 2018	
Stanley Cup champion	2024	
International
World Championship All-Star Team	2015, 2018	

Awards and achievements
Preceded by Viktor Tikhonov	Phoenix Coyotes first-round draft pick 2009	Succeeded by Brandon Gormley
Sporting positions
Preceded by Shane Doan	Arizona Coyotes captain 2018–2021	None Franchise suspended operations
