= Marcel Sgualdo =

Swiss ice hockey player

- Born: December 18, 1944 (age 80); Switzerland
- Height: 6 ft 0 in (183 cm)
- Weight: 190 lb (86 kg; 13 st 8 lb)
- Position: Defence
- Played for: HC La Chaux-de-Fonds
- National team: Switzerland
- Playing career: 1968–1982

Marcel Sgualdo (born December 18, 1944) is a retired Swiss professional ice hockey player who played for HC La Chaux-de-Fonds in the National League A. He also represented the Swiss national team at the 1972 Winter Olympics.
