= Ivan Pronin =

Russian cross-country skier

Personal information
- Nationality: Russian
- Born: 10 October 1947 Ukhta, Russian SFSR, Soviet Union
- Died: 21 March 2021 (aged 73)

Sport
- Sport: Cross-country skiing

Ivan Pronin (10 October 1947 – 21 March 2021) was a Russian cross-country skier. He competed in the men's 50 kilometre event at the 1972 Winter Olympics.
