= Feliks Góralczyk =

Polish ice hockey player

- Born: 16 June 1950; Wyry, Poland
- Died: 14 January 1980 (aged 29); Wyry, Poland
- Height: 5 ft 7 in (170 cm)
- Weight: 176 lb (80 kg; 12 st 8 lb)
- Position: Forward
- Played for: Fortuna Wyry; Baildon Katowice
- National team: Poland
- Playing career: 1966–1972

Feliks Góralczyk (14 January 1950 – 16 June 1980) was a Polish ice hockey player. He played for Fortuna Wyry and Baildon Katowice during his career. He also played for the Polish national team at the 1972 Winter Olympics and 1970 World Championship, as well as the lower division tournaments in 1971 and 1972. During the last game of the 1972 Group B tournament, against Yugoslavia, Góralczyk fell on the ice and was hit in the eye by the back of a Yugoslav player's skate; the injury cost Góralczyk his eye, and he had to retire. Depressed from the injury, he died in 1980. His brother, Robert, played at the 1972 and 1976 Winter Olympics.
