= Yasushin Tanaka =

Japanese ice hockey player

Personal information
- Nationality: Japanese
- Born: 18 August 1945 (age 79); Hokkaido, Japan

Sport
- Sport: Ice hockey

Yasushin Tanaka (田中 保伸, Tanaka Yasushin, born 18 August 1945) is a Japanese ice hockey player. He competed in the men's tournaments at the 1972 Winter Olympics and the 1976 Winter Olympics.
