= Kazimierz Czachowski =

Polish literary critic and historian

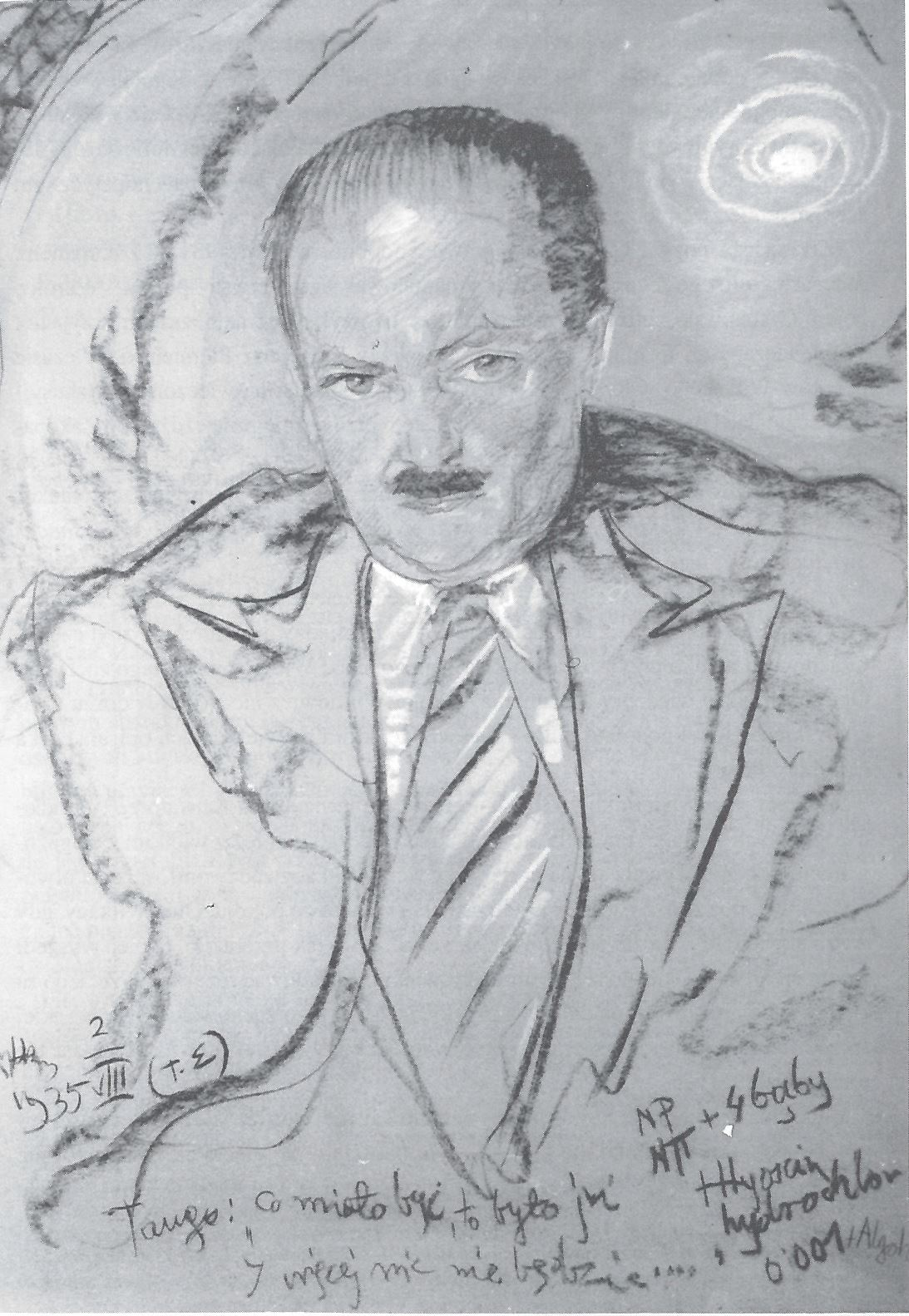
1935 drawing of Kazimierz Czachowski by Stanisław Ignacy Witkiewicz

Kazimierz Czachowski or Kazimierz Stanisław Czachowski (Łyszkowice near Łowicz, November 28, 1890 – August 17, 1948, Kraków) was a Polish literary critic and historian, active predominantly in the Second Polish Republic.

He was awarded the Golden Laurel of the Polish Academy of Literature in 1937 for his monographs about world-renowned authors such as Henryk Sienkiewicz, Marcel Proust, Thomas Mann, John Galsworthy and others. He translated into Polish The Picture of Dorian Gray by Oscar Wilde (1928). He wrote under several different pen names including Dionizy, Adam Korabski and Ludowiec, and specialized in the literature of Polish positivism and modernism. Soon before his death in 1948 he got entangled in the workings of pro-communist Polish Writers' Union created in 1944 behind the Soviet front line, and served as its president in 1946–1947. He died in Kraków a year later.

== Selected publications ==
- Jan Kasprowicz. Próba bibljografji (1929)
- Literatura francuska w przekładach Boya Żeleńskiego (1930)
- Henryk Sienkiewicz. Obraz twórczości (1931)
- Juliusz Kaden-Bandrowski (1931)
- Współczesna powieść polska (1931)
- Wacław Sieroszewski. Człowiek i patriota (1933)
- Obraz współczesnej literatury polskiej 1884-1933 (1934-1936, 3 volumes)
- Marja Rodziewiczówna na tle swoich powieści (1935)
- Pod piórem, Drukarnia "Domu prasy", 1947 - 212 pages

== Notes and references ==
- Biogramy uczonych polskich, Część I: Nauki społeczne, zeszyt 1: A-J, Wrocław 1983
