= Józef Batkiewicz =

Polish ice hockey player

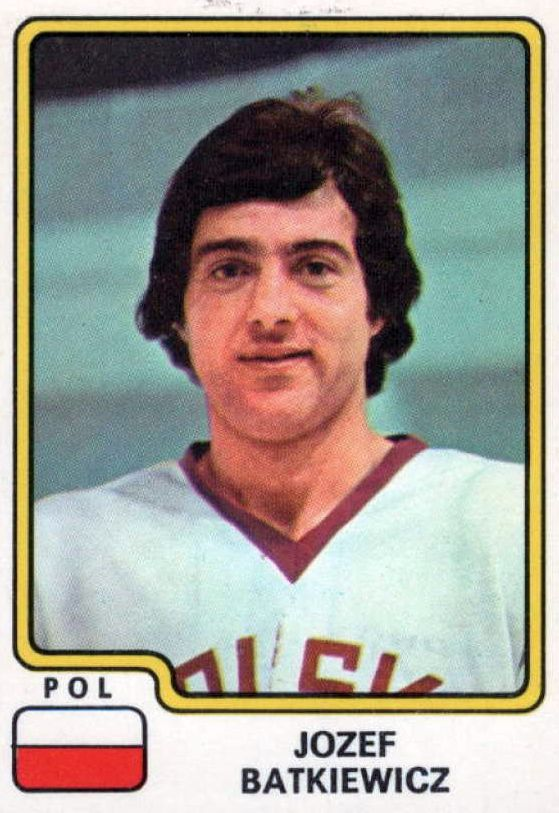
- Born: February 22, 1950 (age 75); Nowy Targ, Poland
- Height: 5 ft 7 in (170 cm)
- Weight: 170 lb (77 kg; 12 st 2 lb)
- Position: Forward
- Played for: Naprzód Janów
- National team: Poland
- Playing career: 1966–1980

Józef Batkiewicz (born 22 February 1950), is a Polish former ice hockey player. He played for Podhale Nowy Targ during his career. He also played for the Polish national team at the 1972 Winter Olympics and multiple world championships.
