= Alfred Kälin =

Swiss cross-country skier

Olympic medal record

Men's cross-country skiing
Bronze medal – third place	1972 Sapporo	4 x 10 km

Alfred Kälin (born 16 January 1949) is a former Swiss cross-country skier who competed in the early 1970s. He won a bronze medal in the 4 x 10 km relay at the 1972 Winter Olympics in Sapporo. He also competed at the 1976 Winter Olympics.
