= Reinhold Bauer =

German ice hockey player

Personal information
- Nationality: German
- Born: 28 July 1950 (age 74); Stadl, West Germany

Sport
- Sport: Ice hockey

Reinhold Bauer (born 28 July 1950) is a German ice hockey player. He competed in the men's tournament at the 1972 Winter Olympics.
