= Gene Morgan (skier) =

American cross-country skier (born 1944)

Personal information
- Nationality: American
- Born: September 16, 1944 (age 81) Munich, Germany

Sport
- Sport: Cross-country skiing

Gene Morgan (born September 16, 1944) is an American cross-country skier. He competed in the men's 50 kilometre event at the 1972 Winter Olympics.
