= Giuseppe Dermon =

Swiss cross-country skier

Personal information
- Nationality: Swiss
- Born: 27 November 1945 (age 79)

Sport
- Sport: Cross-country skiing

Giuseppe Dermon (born 27 November 1945) is a Swiss cross-country skier. He competed in the men's 50 kilometre event at the 1972 Winter Olympics.
