= Isao Kakihara =

Japanese ice hockey player

Personal information
- Nationality: Japanese
- Born: 1 April 1944 (age 82) Hokkaido, Japan

Sport
- Sport: Ice hockey

Isao Kakihara (垣原 功, Kakihara Isao; born 1 May 1944) is a Japanese ice hockey player. He competed in the men's tournament at the 1972 Winter Olympics.
