= Aleksander Klima =

Polish biathlete (born 1945)

Personal information
- Nationality: Polish
- Born: 13 August 1945 (age 79); Oschatz, Germany

Sport
- Sport: Biathlon

Aleksander Klima (born 13 August 1945) is a Polish former biathlete. He competed in the 20 km individual event at the 1972 Winter Olympics.
