= Louis Jäggi =

Swiss cross-country skier

Personal information
- Nationality: Swiss
- Born: 17 November 1948
- Died: 19 March 2007 (aged 58)

Sport
- Sport: Cross-country skiing

Louis Jäggi (17 November 1948 – 19 March 2007) was a Swiss cross-country skier. He competed in the men's 50 kilometre event at the 1972 Winter Olympics.
