= Halina Auderska =

Polish screenwriter, writer and politician

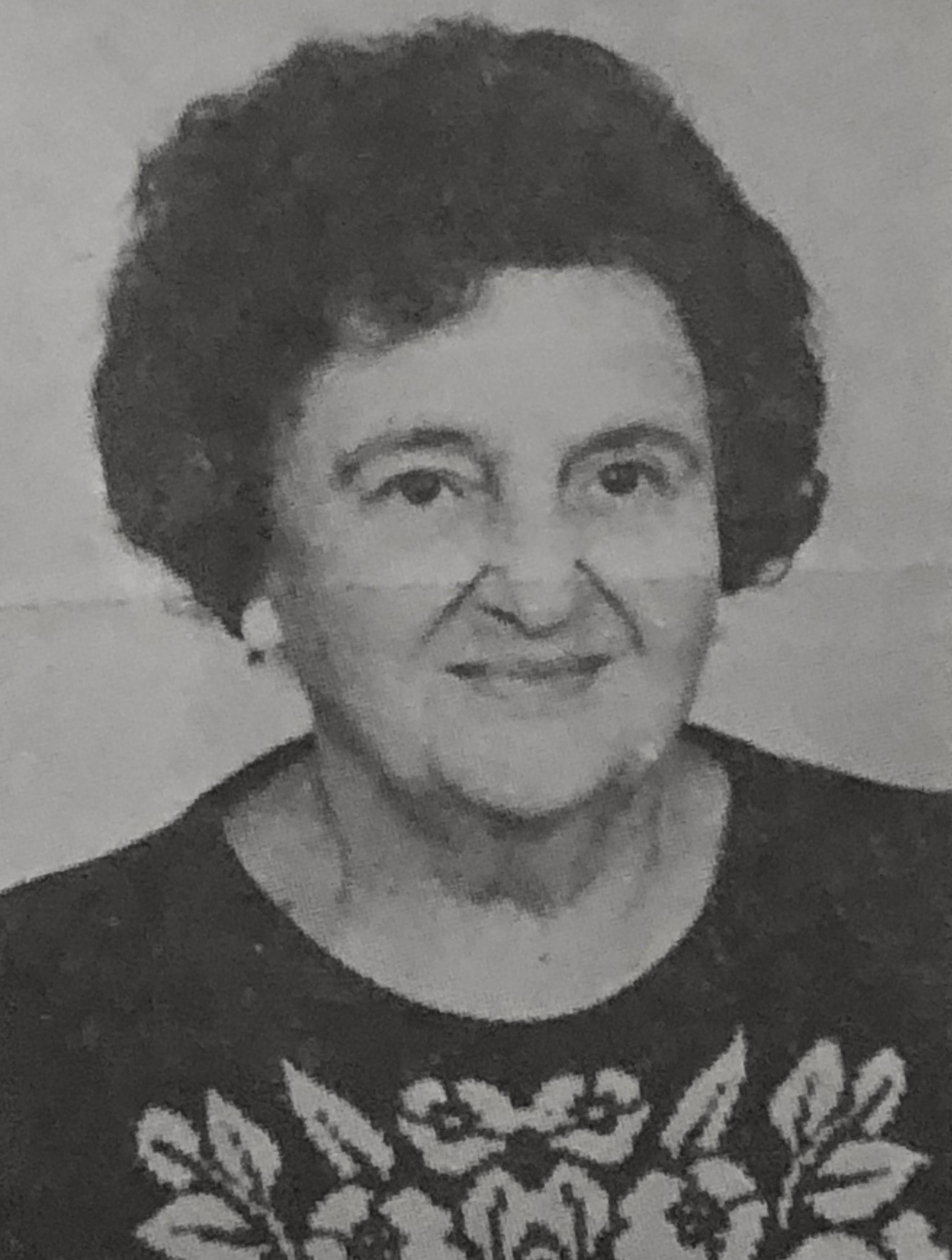

Personal details
- Born: 3 July 1904 Odessa, Russian Empire
- Died: 21 February 2000 (aged 95) Warsaw, Poland
- Resting place: Powązki Cemetery
- Party: Polish United Workers' Party
- Profession: Writer, politician

Halina Maria Auderska (3 July 1904 – 21 February 2000) was a Polish screenwriter, writer, lexicographer and politician who served as a member of Parliament of the Polish People's Republic of the 8th and 9th term.

== Biography ==
The granddaughter of a Siberian exile, she was the daughter of Roman, an engineer, and Helena, née Janelli. Initially, she was home-schooled, then studied at a Polish grammar school in Odessa named after Aleksander Jabłonowski. She graduated in Polish philology from the University of Warsaw and studied pedagogy. In the years 1926–1939 she worked as a secondary school teacher.

During World War II, she was a medic in Warsaw and a soldier of the Union of Armed Struggle-Home Army, codenamed Nowicka. During the occupation, she also participated in secret education. She participated in the Warsaw Uprising as a press war reporter.

She made her debut in 1924 as the author of radio plays. In 1935, she published the novel Poczwarki Wielkiego Parady. In the years 1946–1950, she was the editor-in-chief of the Trzaska, Evert i Michalski publishing house. In the years 1956–1959, she was on the editorial team of the monthly Dialog. In the years 1950–1969 deputy editor-in-chief of the Dictionary of the Polish Language. In the years 1958–1979 co-founder and long-time president of the ITI. In 1964 she signed the letter of Polish writers protesting against the letter 34, expressing protest against the organized campaign conducted in the Western press and on the waves of the sabotage radio station Free Europe, denigration of the People's Republic of Poland.

In the years 1983–1986 she was the first president of the Association of Polish Writers, an organization established by the communist authorities in place of the union of the same name that had been dissolved by them earlier (honorary president since 1986).

In the years 1981–1983 she was a member of the presidium of the National Committee of the Front of National Unity. Member of the Presidium of the Provisional National Council of the Patriotic Movement for National Rebirth (PRON), then of the National Council of PRON. In 1983, she was elected to the Presidium of the National Council of the Polish-Soviet Friendship Society. She was a member of the Executive Committee of the National Council of the PRON and a member of the National Peace Committee. In the years 1980–1989, she was a non-partisan member of parliament.

She died in Warsaw and was buried in the Powązki Cemetery (section 103-6-2).
