= Michel Turler =

Swiss ice hockey player

- Born: May 14, 1944; Switzerland
- Died: April 8, 2010 (aged 65); La Chaux-de-Fonds, Switzerland
- Height: 5 ft 9 in (175 cm)
- Weight: 172 lb (78 kg; 12 st 4 lb)
- Position: Center
- Shot: Left
- Played for: HC La Chaux-de-Fonds; EHC Biel
- National team: Switzerland
- Playing career: 1965–1979

Michel Turler (May 14, 1944 – April 8, 2010) was a former Swiss professional ice hockey forward who played for HC La Chaux-de-Fonds and EHC Biel in the National League A. He also represented the Swiss national team at the 1972 Winter Olympics.
