= Ulrich Wenger =

Swiss cross-country skier

Personal information
- Nationality: Swiss
- Born: 28 May 1944 (age 80)

Sport
- Sport: Cross-country skiing
- Club: GG Bern; SC Obergoms; SC Sangernboden

Ulrich "Ueli" Wenger (born 28 May 1944) is a Swiss cross-country skier. He competed in the men's 50 kilometre event at the 1972 Winter Olympics.
