= Hans Rothkirch =

German ice hockey player

Personal information
- Nationality: German
- Born: 18 April 1951 (age 73); Bad Tölz, West Germany

Sport
- Sport: Ice hockey

Hans Rothkirch (born 18 April 1951) is a German ice hockey player. He competed in the men's tournament at the 1972 Winter Olympics.
