= René Berra =

Swiss ice hockey player

- Born: February 13, 1942 (age 83); Switzerland
- Height: 6 ft 0 in (183 cm)
- Weight: 168 lb (76 kg; 12 st 0 lb)
- Position: Forward
- NLA team: HC Villars; HC La Chaux-de-Fonds; EHC Biel
- National team: Switzerland
- Playing career: 1964–1978

René Berra (born February 13, 1942) is a retired Swiss professional ice hockey player who played in the National League A for HC Villars, HC La Chaux-de-Fonds and EHC Biel. He also represented the Swiss national team at the 1972 Winter Olympics.
