= Mirosław Więckowski =

Polish luger (born 1952)

Personal information
- Nationality: Polish
- Born: 5 June 1952 (age 72); Miłków, Poland

Sport
- Sport: Luge

Mirosław Więckowski (born 5 June 1952) is a Polish luger. He competed at the 1972 Winter Olympics and the 1976 Winter Olympics.
