= Albert Giger =

Swiss cross-country skier (1946–2021)

Personal information
- Born: 7 October 1946 Rhäzüns, Switzerland
- Died: 4 September 2021 (aged 74)
Medal record
Men's cross-country skiing
Olympic Games
Bronze medal – third place	1972 Sapporo	4 x 10km Relay

Albert Giger (7 October 1946, Rhäzüns – 4 September 2021) was a Swiss cross country skier who competed in the early 1970s. He won a bronze in the 4 x 10 km cross-country skiing relay at the 1972 Winter Olympics in Sapporo. He was also a five-times winner of the Engadin Skimarathon.
