= Francis Reinhard =

Swiss ice hockey player

- Born: May 20, 1944 (age 80); Switzerland
- Height: 5 ft 7 in (170 cm)
- Weight: 141 lb (64 kg; 10 st 1 lb)
- Position: Forward
- Played for: HC La Chaux-de-Fonds; Lausanne HC
- National team: Switzerland
- Playing career: 1967–1976

Francis Reinhard (born May 20, 1944) is a retired Swiss professional ice hockey player who played for HC La Chaux-de-Fonds in the National League A. He also represented the Swiss national team at the 1972 Winter Olympics.
