= Takashi Tsuburai =

Japanese ice hockey player

Personal information
- Nationality: Japanese
- Born: 12 September 1951 (age 74) Hokkaido, Japan

Sport
- Sport: Ice hockey

Takashi Tsuburai (粒来 敬詞, Tsuburai Takashi; born 12 September 1951) is a Japanese ice hockey player. He competed in the men's tournament at the 1972 Winter Olympics.
