= Heiko Antons =

German ice hockey player (born 1951)

Personal information
- Nationality: German
- Born: 8 November 1951 (age 74) Hertingen, West Germany

Sport
- Sport: Ice hockey

Heiko Antons (born 8 November 1951) is a German ice hockey player. He competed in the men's tournament at the 1972 Winter Olympics.
