= Paul Probst (ice hockey) =

Swiss ice hockey player

- Born: May 3, 1950 (age 74); Switzerland
- Height: 6 ft 3 in (191 cm)
- Weight: 187 lb (85 kg; 13 st 5 lb)
- Position: Forward
- Played for: HC La Chaux-de-Fonds; EV Zug
- National team: Switzerland
- Playing career: 1970–1981

Paul Probst (born May 3, 1950) is a retired Swiss professional ice hockey player who played for HC La Chaux-de-Fonds and EV Zug in the Nationalliga A. He represented the Swiss national team at the 1972 Winter Olympics.
