= Kenneth Ekman (ice hockey) =

Swedish ice hockey player

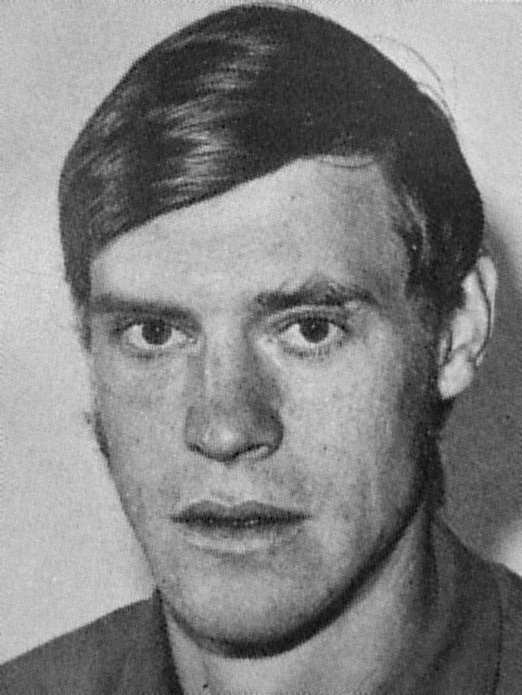
- Born: 5 May 1945 (age 80) Ljungby, Sweden
- Height: 6 ft 1 in (185 cm)
- Weight: 176 lb (80 kg; 12 st 8 lb)
- Position: Defence
- Shot: Right
- Played for: Rögle BK; Tingsryds AIF
- National team: Sweden
- NHL draft: Undrafted
- Playing career: 1960–1982

Karl-Axel Kennert "Kenneth" Ekman (born 5 May 1945) is a Swedish former professional ice hockey defenceman. He competed as a member of the Sweden men's national ice hockey team at the 1972 Winter Olympics held in Japan.

He is grandfather of the hockey player Oliver Ekman-Larsson and the football player Amanda Ilestedt and a cousin of professional cyclists the Fåglum brothers.
