= Iwao Nakayama =

Japanese ice hockey player

Personal information
- Nationality: Japanese
- Born: 2 July 1949 (age 75); Hokkaido, Japan

Sport
- Sport: Ice hockey

Iwao Nakayama (中山 巌, Nakayama Iwao, born 2 July 1949) is a Japanese ice hockey player. He competed in the men's tournaments at the 1972 Winter Olympics, the 1976 Winter Olympics and the 1980 Winter Olympics.
