= Hans Keller (ice hockey) =

Swiss ice hockey player

- Born: March 24, 1944 (age 80); Switzerland
- Height: 5 ft 7 in (170 cm)
- Weight: 159 lb (72 kg; 11 st 5 lb)
- Position: Forward
- NLA team: Zürcher SC
- National team: Switzerland
- Playing career: 1965–1972

Hans Keller (born March 24, 1944) is a Swiss retired professional ice hockey forward who played for Zürcher SC in the National League A. He also represented the Swiss national team at the 1972 Winter Olympics.
