= Gérald Rigolet =

Swiss ice hockey player

- Born: March 26, 1941 (age 83); Rechthalten, Switzerland
- Height: 5 ft 8 in (173 cm)
- Weight: 157 lb (71 kg; 11 st 3 lb)
- Position: Goaltender
- National team: Switzerland
- Playing career: 1964–1972

Gérald Rigolet (born March 26, 1941, in Switzerland) is a former Swiss ice hockey player who played for the Switzerland men's national ice hockey team at the 1964 and 1972 Olympics.
