= Gaston Furrer =

Swiss ice hockey player

- Born: 10 May 1945 (age 79); Staldenried, Switzerland
- Height: 5 ft 10 in (178 cm)
- Weight: 168 lb (76 kg; 12 st 0 lb)
- Position: Forward
- National team: Switzerland
- Playing career: 1964–1972

Gaston Furrer (born 10 May 1945 in Staldenried, Switzerland) is a former Swiss ice hockey player who played for the Switzerland men's national ice hockey team at the 1964 and 1972 Olympics.
