= Marian Feter =

Polish former ice hockey player

- Born: March 13, 1946 (age 79); Nowy Targ, Poland
- Height: 5 ft 11 in (180 cm)
- Weight: 174 lb (79 kg; 12 st 6 lb)
- Position: Defence
- Played for: Polonia Bydgoszcz; BKS Bydgoszcz
- National team: Poland
- Playing career: 1964–1981

Marian Feter (born 13 March 1946) is a Polish former ice hockey player. He played for Polonia Bydgoszcz and BKS Bydgoszcz during his career. He also played for the Polish national team at the 1972 Winter Olympics and multiple World Championships.
