= Werner Geeser =

Swiss cross-country skier

Personal information
- Born: 16 February 1948 Arosa, Graubünden, Switzerland
- Died: 9 September 2011 (aged 63)

Sport
- Sport: Skiing
- Updated on 8 December 2012

Werner Geeser (16 February 1948 – 9 September 2011) was a Swiss cross-country skier. He competed in the Men's 30 kilometres and 50 kilometres events at the 1972 Winter Olympics.

== See also ==
- Cross-country skiing at the 1972 Winter Olympics
