= Charles Henzen =

Swiss ice hockey player

- Born: October 4, 1945 (age 79); Switzerland
- Height: 5 ft 8 in (173 cm)
- Weight: 172 lb (78 kg; 12 st 4 lb)
- Position: Defence
- National team: Switzerland
- Playing career: 1972–1976

Charles Henzen (born October 4, 1945 in Switzerland) is a former Swiss ice hockey player who played for the Switzerland men's national ice hockey team at the 1972 and 1976 Olympics.
