= Walery Kosyl =

Polish ice hockey player (1944–2025)

- Born: 17 March 1944 Alfeld, Lower Saxony, Germany
- Died: 8 November 2025 (aged 81)
- Height: 5 ft 10 in (178 cm)
- Weight: 176 lb (80 kg; 12 st 8 lb)
- Position: Goaltender
- Played for: ŁKS Łódź; Legia Warszawa
- National team: Poland
- NHL draft: Undrafted
- Playing career: 1963–1983

Walery Kosyl (17 March 1944 – 8 November 2025) was a Polish ice hockey goaltender. He played for the Poland men's national ice hockey team at the 1972 Winter Olympics in Sapporo, and the 1976 Winter Olympics in Innsbruck. Kosyl also represented Poland at the IIHF World Championships seven times.

Kosyl was born in Alfeld, Nazi Germany, where his parents, originally from Łódź were forcibly made n to work for the Third Reich.

He played 21 seasons in the Polska Liga Hokejowa with ŁKS Łódź and Legia Warszawa. Kosyl won the Polish championship with Warszawa in 1967.

Kosyl died on 8 November 2025, at the age of 81.
