= René Huguenin =

Swiss ice hockey player

- Born: 9 August 1944 (age 80); Switzerland
- Height: 5 ft 10 in (178 cm)
- Weight: 151 lb (68 kg; 10 st 11 lb)
- Position: Defence
- Played for: HC La Chaux-de-Fonds
- National team: Switzerland
- Playing career: 1965–1979

René Huguenin (born 9 August 1944) is a retired Swiss professional ice hockey player who played for HC La Chaux-de-Fonds in the National League A. He also represented the Swiss national team at the 1972 Winter Olympics.
