= Tadeusz Obłój =

Polish ice hockey player (born 1950)

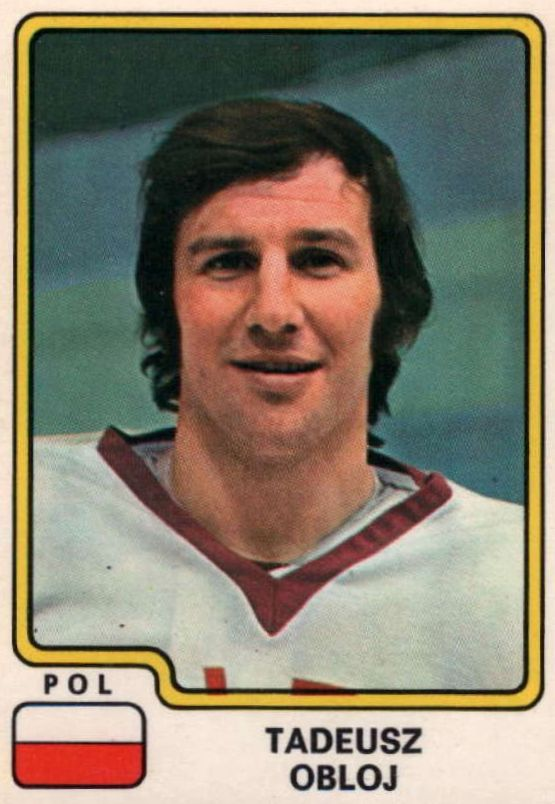
- Born: August 29, 1950 (age 75) Katowice, Poland
- Height: 5 ft 9 in (175 cm)
- Weight: 174 lb (79 kg; 12 st 6 lb)
- Position: Centre
- Played for: Baildon Katowice
- National team: Poland
- NHL draft: Undrafted
- Playing career: 1971–1980

Tadeusz Jan Obłój (born August 29, 1950) is a former Polish ice hockey player. He played for the Poland men's national ice hockey team at the 1972 Winter Olympics in Sapporo, the 1976 Winter Olympics in Innsbruck, and the 1980 Winter Olympics in Lake Placid.
