= Józefa Chromik =

Polish cross-country skier

Personal information
- Nationality: Polish
- Born: 10 June 1946 (age 79) Poronin, Poland

Sport
- Sport: Cross-country skiing

Józefa Chromik (born 10 June 1946) is a Polish cross-country skier. She competed in three events at the 1972 Winter Olympics.

== Cross-country skiing results ==
=== Olympic Games ===
Year	Age	5 km	10 km	3 × 5 km relay
1972	25	21	21	7
