= Peter Aeschlimann =

Swiss ice hockey player (born 1946)

- Born: July 12, 1946 (age 79) Bern, Switzerland
- Height: 6 ft 1 in (185 cm)
- Weight: 190 lb (86 kg; 13 st 8 lb)
- NLA team: HC Lugano
- National team: Switzerland
- Playing career: 1972–1972

Peter Aeschlimann (born July 12, 1946) is a retired Swiss professional ice hockey player who represented the Swiss national team at the 1972 Winter Olympics. He is the son of Roger Aeschlimann
