= Alfio Molina =

Swiss ice hockey player (born 1948)

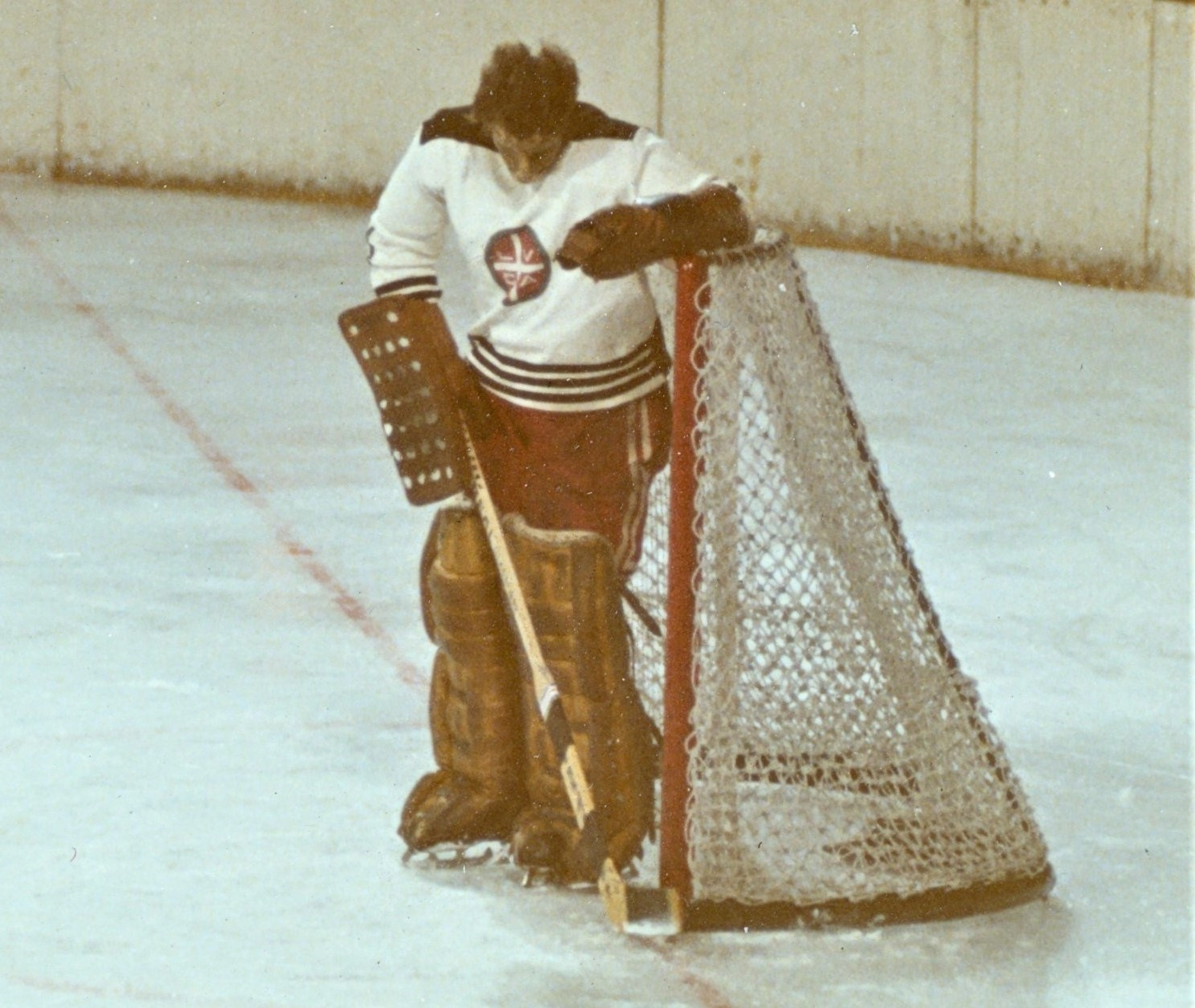
- Born: April 20, 1948 (age 76); Lugano, Switzerland
- Height: 5 ft 9 in (175 cm)
- Weight: 154 lb (70 kg; 11 st 0 lb)
- Position: Goaltender
- Caught: Left
- Played for: HC Lugano
- National team: Switzerland
- Playing career: 1964–1987

Alfio Molina (born April 20, 1948) is a former Swiss ice hockey player who played for HC Lugano at National League A. He also represented the Switzerland men's national ice hockey team at the 1972 and 1976 Olympics.
