= Jacques Pousaz =

Swiss ice hockey player (1947–2022)

- Born: 5 August 1947; Switzerland
- Died: 6 December 2022 (aged 75)
- Height: 5 ft 10 in (178 cm)
- Weight: 170 lb (77 kg; 12 st 2 lb)
- Position: Forward
- Played for: HC La Chaux-de-Fonds; Genève-Servette HC; HC Sierre-Anniviers
- National team: Switzerland
- Playing career: 1968–1978

Jacques Pousaz (5 August 1947 – 6 December 2022) was a Swiss professional ice hockey player who played in the Nationalliga A for HC La Chaux-de-Fonds, Genève-Servette HC and HC Sierre-Anniviers. He represented the Swiss national team at the 1972 Winter Olympics.

Pousaz died from a heart attack on 6 December 2022, at the age of 75.
