= Wiesław Tokarz =

Polish ice hockey player

- Born: 10 August 1951 (age 74) Nowy Targ, Poland
- Height: 5 ft 10 in (178 cm)
- Weight: 159 lb (72 kg; 11 st 5 lb)
- Position: Forward
- Played for: Podhale Nowy Targ; GKS Katowice; Zagłębie Sosnowiec
- National team: Poland
- Playing career: 1970–1983

Wiesław Wawrzyniec Tokarz (born 10 August 1951) is a Polish former ice hockey player. He played for Podhale Nowy Targ, GKS Katowice, and Zagłębie Sosnowiec during his career. Tokarz won the Polish league championship six times, twice with Podhale in 1971 and 1972, and with Zagłębie from 1980 until 1983. He also played for the Polish national team at the 1972 Winter Olympics and multiple World Championships. His brother, Leszek, also played hockey, and was a teammate at the 1972 Winter Olympics. In 2005 he was awarded the Gold Cross of Merit for his services to sport.
