= Robert Góralczyk (ice hockey) =

Polish ice hockey player

- Born: March 21, 1943; Wyry
- Died: May 18, 1984 (aged 41); Oświęcim, Poland
- Height: 5 ft 7 in (170 cm)
- Weight: 159 lb (72 kg; 11 st 5 lb)
- Position: Defence
- Played for: Baildon Katowice
- National team: Poland
- NHL draft: Undrafted
- Playing career: 1972–1976

Robert Góralczyk (March 21, 1943 – May 18, 1984) was a Polish ice hockey defenceman. He played for the Poland men's national ice hockey team at the 1972 Winter Olympics in Sapporo and the 1976 Winter Olympics in Innsbruck. His brother, Feliks, also played at the 1972 Winter Olympics.
