= Gérard Dubi =

Swiss ice hockey player

- Born: November 27, 1943 (age 81); Switzerland
- Height: 5 ft 7 in (170 cm)
- Weight: 152 lb (69 kg; 10 st 12 lb)
- Position: Forward
- Played for: Lausanne HC; Genève-Servette HC
- National team: Switzerland
- Playing career: 1960–1980

Gérard Dubi (born November 27, 1943) is a retired Swiss professional ice hockey forward. He played almost his entire career for Lausanne HC, apart from the 1969–70 season when he played for Genève-Servette HC. He also represented the Swiss national team at the 1972 Winter Olympics.
