= Andrzej Szczepaniec =

Polish ice hockey player

- Born: May 10, 1952 (age 72); Nowy Targ, Poland
- Height: 5 ft 9 in (175 cm)
- Weight: 163 lb (74 kg; 11 st 9 lb)
- Position: Defence
- Played for: Podhale Nowy Targ; GKS Katowice; HC Ambrì-Piotta
- National team: Poland
- Playing career: 1970–1983

Andrzej Szczepaniec (born 10 May 1952) is a Polish former ice hockey player. He played for Podhale Nowy Targ, GKS Katowice, and HC Ambrì-Piotta during his career. Szczepaniec won the Polish league championship with Podhale in both 1971 and 1972. He also played for the Polish national team at the 1972 Winter Olympics and the 1973 and 1976 World Championships.
