= Walenty Ziętara =

Polish ice hockey player

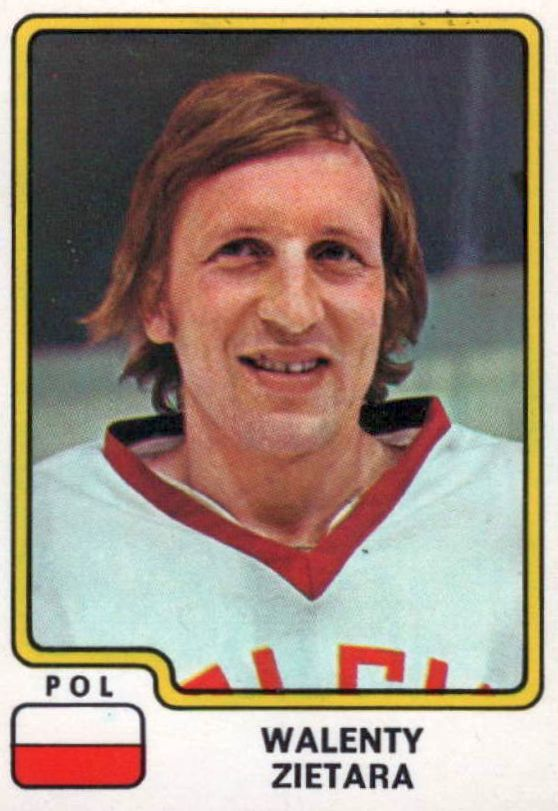
- Born: October 27, 1948 (age 76); Nowy Targ, Poland
- Height: 5 ft 8 in (173 cm)
- Weight: 159 lb (72 kg; 11 st 5 lb)
- Position: Right wing
- Played for: Podhale Nowy Targ
- National team: Poland
- NHL draft: Undrafted
- Playing career: ?–?

Walenty Ziętara (born October 27, 1948) is a former Polish ice hockey player. He played for the Poland men's national ice hockey team at the 1972 Winter Olympics in Sapporo, and the 1976 Winter Olympics in Innsbruck.
