= Ludwik Czachowski =

Polish ice hockey player

- Born: May 5, 1944; Toruń, Nazi Germany
- Died: July 10, 1999 (aged 55); Bydgoszcz, Poland
- Height: 5 ft 7 in (170 cm)
- Weight: 172 lb (78 kg; 12 st 4 lb)
- Position: Defence
- Played for: TKH Toruń
- National team: Poland
- Playing career: 1962–1975

Ludwik Czachowski (5 May 1944 – 10 July 1999), was a Polish ice hockey player. He played for TKH Toruń during his career. He also played for the Polish national team at the 1972 Winter Olympics and several World Championships.
