= Guy Dubois =

Swiss ice hockey player

- Born: January 14, 1950 (age 75); Switzerland
- Height: 5 ft 9 in (175 cm)
- Weight: 172 lb (78 kg; 12 st 4 lb)
- Position: Forward
- National team: Switzerland
- Playing career: 1972–1976

Guy Dubois (born January 14, 1950, in Switzerland) is a former Swiss ice hockey player who played for the Switzerland men's national ice hockey team at the 1972 and 1976 Olympics.
