= Peter Lehmann (ice hockey) =

Swiss ice hockey player

- Born: January 28, 1946 (age 79); Switzerland
- Height: 5 ft 8 in (173 cm)
- Weight: 172 lb (78 kg; 12 st 4 lb)
- Position: Defence
- NLA team: SCL Tigers
- National team: Switzerland
- Playing career: 1972–1972

Peter Lehmann (born January 28, 1946) is a retired Swiss professional ice hockey defenceman who played for SCL Tigers in the National League A. He also represented the Swiss national team at the 1972 Winter Olympics.
