= Leszek Tokarz =

Polish ice hockey player

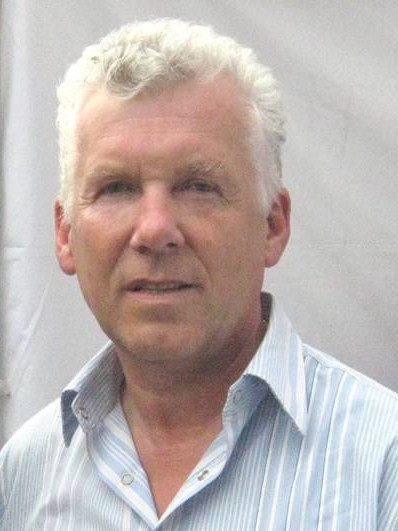
- Tokarz in 2009
- Born: July 9, 1953 (age 71); Nowy Targ, Poland
- Height: 5 ft 9 in (175 cm)
- Weight: 148 lb (67 kg; 10 st 8 lb)
- Position: Centre
- Played for: Podhale Nowy Targ; GKS Katowice; Zagłębie Sosnowiec
- National team: Poland
- Playing career: 1970–1981

Leszek Michał Tokarz (born 9 July 1953) is a Polish former ice hockey player. He played for Podhale Nowy Targ, GKS Katowice, and Zagłębie Sosnowiec during his career. Tokarz won the Polish league championship six times, twice with Podhale in 1971 and 1972, and with Zagłębie in 1980 and 1981. He also played for the Polish national team at the 1972 Winter Olympics and multiple World Championships. His brother, Wiesław, also played hockey, and was a teammate at the 1972 Winter Olympics. In 2005 he was awarded the Gold Cross of Merit for his services to sport.
