= Ice hockey at the 1924 Winter Olympics – Rosters =

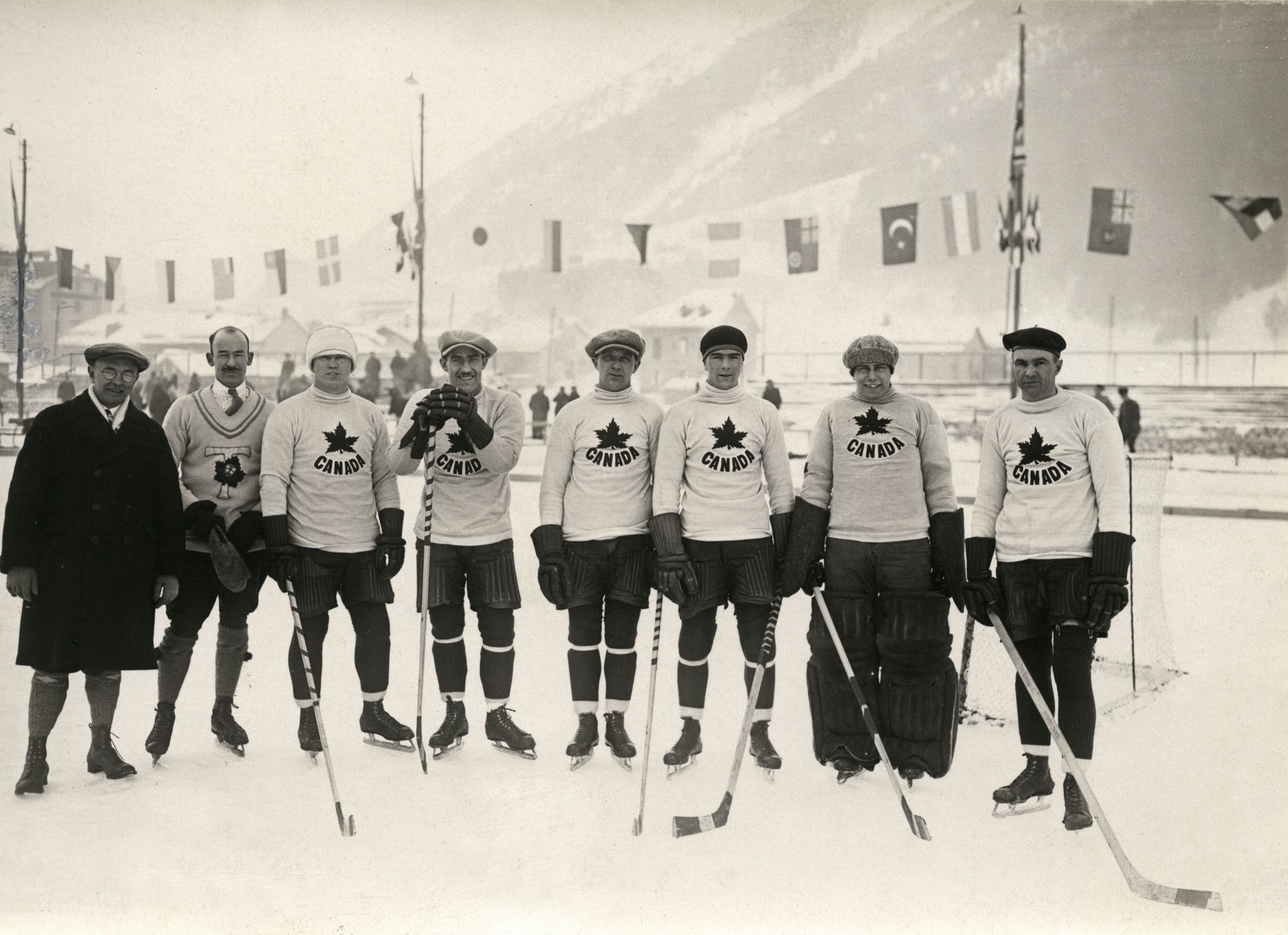
The Toronto Granites, played as Canada during the Olympics, winning the gold medal.

The 1924 Winter Olympics ice hockey rosters consisted of 82 players on 8 national ice hockey teams. Played at the first edition of the Winter Olympics, it was also considered to be the World Championship by the International Ice Hockey Federation (IIHF), the second overall (after the 1920 Summer Olympics, which had ice hockey). Teams were required to be strictly amateur, so players from the Canadian-based National Hockey League (NHL) or other professional leagues were excluded. Canada sent the Toronto Granites, who had won the 1923 Allan Cup, the amateur championship in Canada.

== Belgium ==
Head coach: André Poplimont

Position	Player	Birthdate	Club
D	Louis De Ridder	June 9, 1902 (aged 21)	(Belgium) Brussels IHSC
D	François Franck	September 14, 1904 (aged 19)	(Belgium) CP Antwerp
F	Henri Louette	September 6, 1900 (aged 23)	(Belgium) LP Antwerp
F	André Poplimont (C)	April 18, 1893 (aged 30)	(Belgium) CP Antwerp
F	Fréderic Rudolph	1899 (aged 24/25)	(Belgium) CP Antwerp
G	Paul Van den Broeck	September 18, 1904 (aged 19)	(Belgium) LP Antwerp
F	Carlos Van den Driessche	August 31, 1901 (aged 22)	(Belgium) Brussels IHSC
D	Philippe Van Volckxsom	May 1, 1897 (aged 26)	N/A
D	Gaston Van Volxem	April 24, 1895 (aged 28)	N/A
G	Victor Verschueren	April 19, 1893 (aged 30)	(Belgium) LP Antwerp

== Canada ==
Head coach: Frank Rankin

Position	Player	Birthdate	Club
G	Jack Cameron	December 3, 1900 (aged 23)	(Canada) Toronto Granites
G	Ernie Collett	March 3, 1895 (aged 28)	(Canada) Toronto Granites
D/F	Bert McCaffrey	April 12, 1893 (aged 30)	(Canada) Toronto Granites
D	Harold McMunn	October 6, 1902 (aged 21)	(Canada) Toronto Granites
D/F	Dunc Munro (C)	January 19, 1901 (aged 23)	(Canada) Toronto Granites
D	Beattie Ramsay	December 12, 1895 (aged 28)	(Canada) Toronto Granites
F	Cyril Slater	March 24, 1896 (aged 27)	(Canada) Toronto Granites
F	Hooley Smith	January 7, 1903 (aged 21)	(Canada) Toronto Granites
F	Harry Watson	July 14, 1898 (aged 25)	(Canada) Toronto Granites

== Czechoslovakia ==
Head coach: Jaroslav Řezáč

Position	Player	Birthdate	Club
D	Jan Fleischmann	July 6, 1885 (aged 38)	N/A
F	Miloslav Fleischmann	September 4, 1886 (aged 37)	(Czechoslovakia) HC Slavia Praha
F	Jaroslav Jirkovský	March 8, 1891 (aged 32)	(Czechoslovakia) HC Slavia Praha
F	Jan Krásl	August 10, 1899 (aged 24)	(Czechoslovakia) HC Slavia Praha
F	Valentin Loos	April 13, 1895 (aged 28)	(Czechoslovakia) HC Slavia Praha
F	Josef Maleček	June 18, 1903 (aged 20)	(Czechoslovakia) HC Spartia Praha
D	Jan Palouš	October 25, 1888 (aged 35)	(Czechoslovakia) HC Slavia Praha
G	Jaroslav Řezáč	February 6, 1886 (aged 37)	(Czechoslovakia) HC Slavia Praha
F	Josef Šroubek (C)	December 2, 1891 (aged 32)	(Czechoslovakia) HC Slavia Praha
G	Jaroslav Stránský	June 6, 1899 (aged 24)	(Czechoslovakia) HC Slavia Praha
D	Otakar Vindyš	April 9, 1889 (aged 34)	(Czechoslovakia) HC Slavia Praha

== France ==
Head coach: Robert Lacroix

Position	Player	Birthdate	Club
F/D	André Charlet	April 23, 1898 (aged 25)	(France) Chamonix
D/F	Pierre Charpentier	March 28, 1888 (aged 35)	(France) CSH Paris
D	Jacques Chaudron	June 2, 1889 (aged 34)	(France) CSH Paris
D	Raoul Couvert	June 24, 1903 (aged 20)	(France) Chamonix
F	Alfred de Rauch (C)	June 1, 1887 (aged 36)	(France) CSH Paris
G	Maurice del Valle	April 23, 1883 (aged 40)	(France) CSH Paris
F	Albert Hassler	November 2, 1903 (aged 20)	(France) Chamonix
G	Charles Lavaivre	February 14, 1905 (aged 18)	(France) Chamonix
F	Jean-Joseph Monnard	February 11, 1901 (aged 22)	(France) Chamonix
F	Charles Payot	April 21, 1901 (aged 22)	(France) Chamonix
D	Philippe Payot	December 21, 1893 (aged 30)	(France) Chamonix
F	Léonhard Quaglia	January 4, 1896 (aged 28)	N/A

== Great Britain ==
Head coach: Guy Clarkson

Position	Player	Birthdate	Club
G	William Anderson	April 1, 1901 (aged 22)	(England) Cambridge Blues
G	Lorne Carr-Harris	December 15, 1899 (aged 24)	N/A
F	Colin Carruthers (C)	September 17, 1890 (aged 33)	N/A
F	Eric Carruthers	November 10, 1895 (aged 28)	N/A
F	Guy Clarkson	January 1, 1891 (aged 33)	N/A
F	Ross Cuthbert	February 6, 1892 (aged 31)	(United Kingdom) British Army Team
D	Geoffrey Holmes	February 19, 1894 (aged 29)	N/A
D	Hamilton Jukes	May 28, 1895 (aged 28)	N/A
F	Edward Pitblado	February 23, 1896 (aged 27)	(England) Oxford University
D	Blaine Sexton	May 3, 1891 (aged 32)	N/A

== Sweden ==
Position	Player	Birthdate	Club
F/D	Ruben Allinger	December 23, 1891 (aged 32)	(Sweden) Djurgårdens IF
F/D	Wilhelm Arwe	January 28, 1898 (aged 26)	(Sweden) Djurgårdens IF
F	Eric Burman	December 6, 1897 (aged 26)	N/A
F	Birger Holmqvist	December 28, 1900 (aged 23)	(Germany) Berliner Schlittschuh-Club
F/D	Gustaf Johansson	September 14, 1900 (aged 23)	(Germany) Berliner Schlittschuh-Club
F	Helge Johansson	September 8, 1904 (aged 19)	(Sweden) Djurgårdens IF
G	Carl Josefsson	September 1, 1895 (aged 28)	(Sweden) Nacka SK
F	Ernst Karlberg	October 12, 1901 (aged 22)	(Sweden) Djurgårdens IF
F	Nils Molander	June 22, 1889 (aged 34)	(Germany) Berliner Schlittschuh-Club
G	Ejnar Olsson	July 9, 1896 (aged 27)	(Sweden) IK Göta

== Switzerland ==
Head coach: Paul Müller

Position	Player	Birthdate	Club
F	Fred Auckenthaler	September 29, 1899 (aged 24)	(Switzerland) HC Château d'Oex
G	Edouard Filliol	December 16, 1895 (aged 28)	(Switzerland) Genève-Servette HC
D	Marius Jaccard	March 27, 1898 (aged 25)	(Switzerland) HC Château d'Oex
F	Ernest Jacquet	September 25, 1886 (aged 37)	(Switzerland) HC Rosey Gstaad
F	Bruno Leuzinger	January 6, 1886 (aged 38)	(Switzerland) HC Château d'Oex
D	Ernest Mottier	April 16, 1891 (aged 32)	(Switzerland) HC Château d'Oex
F/D	Paul Müller	February 22, 1896 (aged 27)	(Switzerland) HC Davos
G	René Savoie	February 9, 1896 (aged 27)	(Switzerland) HC Château d'Oex
F	Donald Unger	March 18, 1894 (aged 29)	(Switzerland) EHC St. Moritz
N/A	André Verdeil	January 21, 1904 (aged 20)	(Switzerland) HC Château d'Oex
F	Walter von Siebenthal (C)	June 6, 1899 (aged 24)	(Switzerland) HC Rosey Gstaad

== United States ==
Head coach: William Haddock

Position	Player	Birthdate	Club
D	Clarence Abel (C)	May 28, 1900 (aged 23)	(United States) St. Paul Athletic Club
D	Herb Drury	March 2, 1895 (aged 28)	(United States) Pittsburgh Yellow Jackets
G	Alphonse Lacroix	October 21, 1897 (aged 26)	(United States) Boston A.A. Unicorns
G	Art Langley	June 25, 1896 (aged 27)	(United States) Boston Hockey Club
F/D	John Lyons	March 31, 1900 (aged 23)	(United States) Boston A.A. Unicorns
F	Justin McCarthy	January 25, 1899 (aged 25)	(United States) Boston A.A. Unicorns
F	Willard Rice	April 25, 1895 (aged 28)	(United States) Boston A.A. Unicorns
D	Irving Small	July 19, 1891 (aged 32)	(United States) Boston A.A. Unicorns
F	Frank Synott	December 28, 1898 (aged 25)	(United States) Boston A.A. Unicorns

== Sources ==
- Duplacey, James (1998). Total Hockey: The official encyclopedia of the National Hockey League. Total Sports. ISBN 978-0-8362-7114-0.
- Podnieks, Andrew (2010). IIHF Media Guide & Record Book 2011. Moydart Press.
- Wallechinsky, David (1988). The Complete Book of the Olympics. Penguin Books. ISBN 978-0-14-010771-5.
- 1924 Olympic Games report. pp. 706–708 (in French) (digitized copy online)
