= List of Olympic men's ice hockey players for Switzerland =

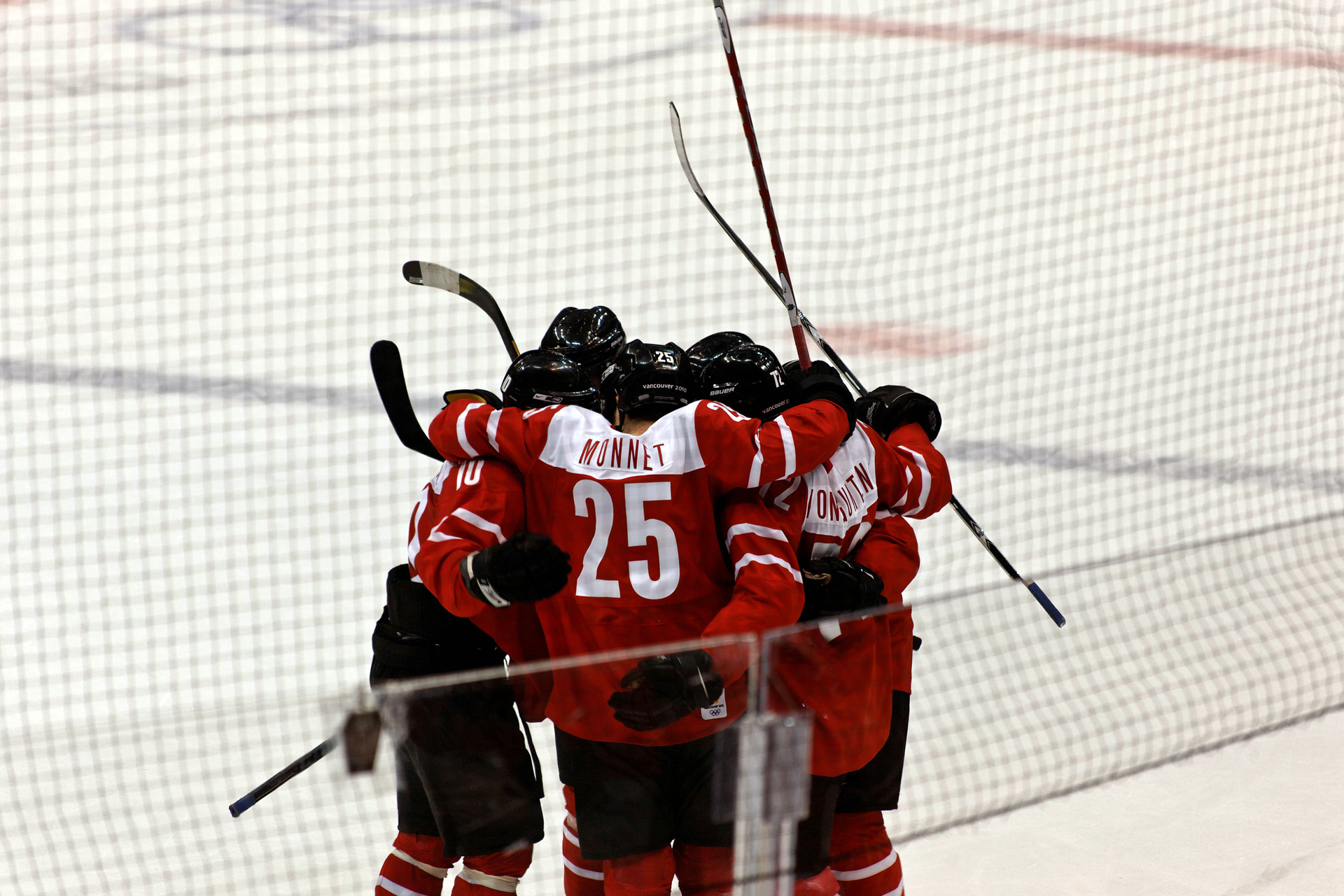
Thibaut Monnet (No. 25) and Patrick von Gunten (No. 72) celebrate a goal during the 2010 Winter Olympics.

Men's ice hockey tournaments have been staged at the Olympic Games since 1920; after its introduction at the 1920 Summer Olympics, it was permanently added to the Winter Olympic Games in 1924. Switzerland has participated in 16 of 23 tournaments, sending 27 goaltenders and 187 skaters.

The Olympic Games were originally intended for amateur athletes, so the players of the National Hockey League (NHL) and other professional leagues were not allowed to compete. Many of Canada's top players were professional, so the Canadian Amateur Hockey Association (CAHA) pushed for the ability to use professional and amateur players. The International Olympic Committee (IOC) refused, and Canada withdrew from the 1972 and 1976 Olympics in protest. In 1986, the IOC voted to allow all athletes to compete in Olympic Games, starting in 1988. The NHL did not allow its players to participate in 1988, 1992 or 1994, because doing so would force the league to halt play during the Olympics. An agreement was reached in 1995 that allowed NHL players to compete in the Olympics, starting with the 1998 Games in Nagano, Japan. The Swiss national team is co-ordinated by the Swiss Ice Hockey Association and players are chosen by the team's management staff.

Switzerland has won two bronze medals in men's ice hockey, in the 1928 Games and 1948 Games; Bibi Torriani is the only player who won medals with both teams. Four players have been inducted into the International Ice Hockey Hall of Fame – Torriani, brothers Ferdinand Cattini and Hans Cattini, and Jakob Kölliker. Three players – Martin Plüss, Mathias Seger, and Mark Streit – have played in four tournaments; Streit was captain for the first three of his appearances. Plüss, Seger, and Streit all have played in 19 games, the most of any Swiss player. Ulrich Poltera holds the record for most goals (21) and most total points (24), while five players have six assists each.

== Key ==
General terms
Term	Definition
GP	Games played
IIHFHOF	International Ice Hockey Federation Hall of Fame
Olympics	Number of Olympic Games tournaments
Ref(s)	Reference(s)

Goaltender statistical abbreviations
Abbreviation	Definition
W	Wins
L	Losses
T	Ties
Min	Minutes played
SO	Shutouts
GA	Goals against
GAA	Goals against average

Skater statistical abbreviations
Abbreviation	Definition
G	Goals
A	Assists
P	Points
PIM	Penalty minutes

== Goaltenders ==
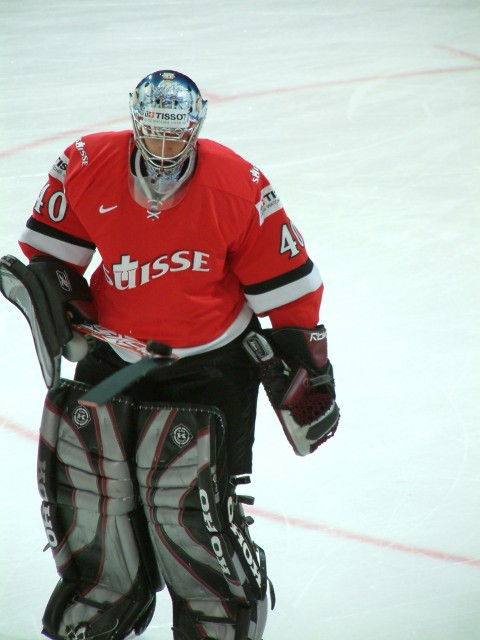
David Aebischer has appeared in two Olympic tournaments for Switzerland, winning just one of his six games.

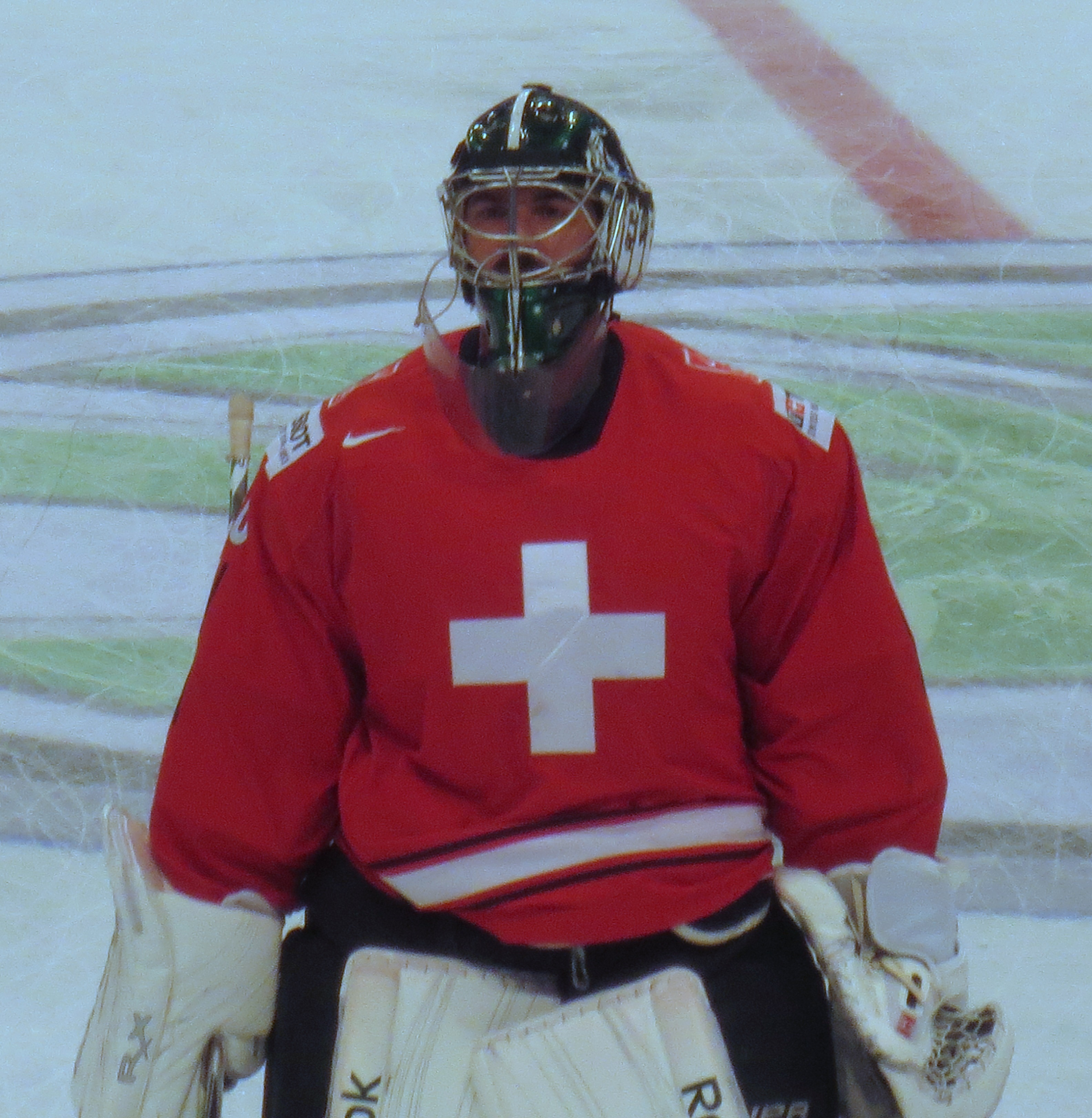
Reto Berra played one game at the 2014 Winter Olympics.

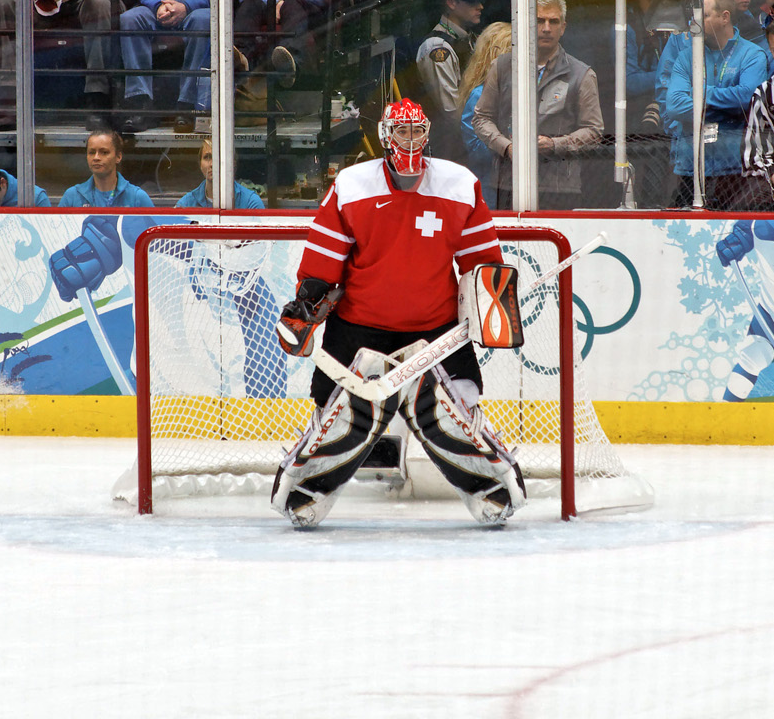
Jonas Hiller has appeared in two Olympic tournaments for Switzerland, winning four games.

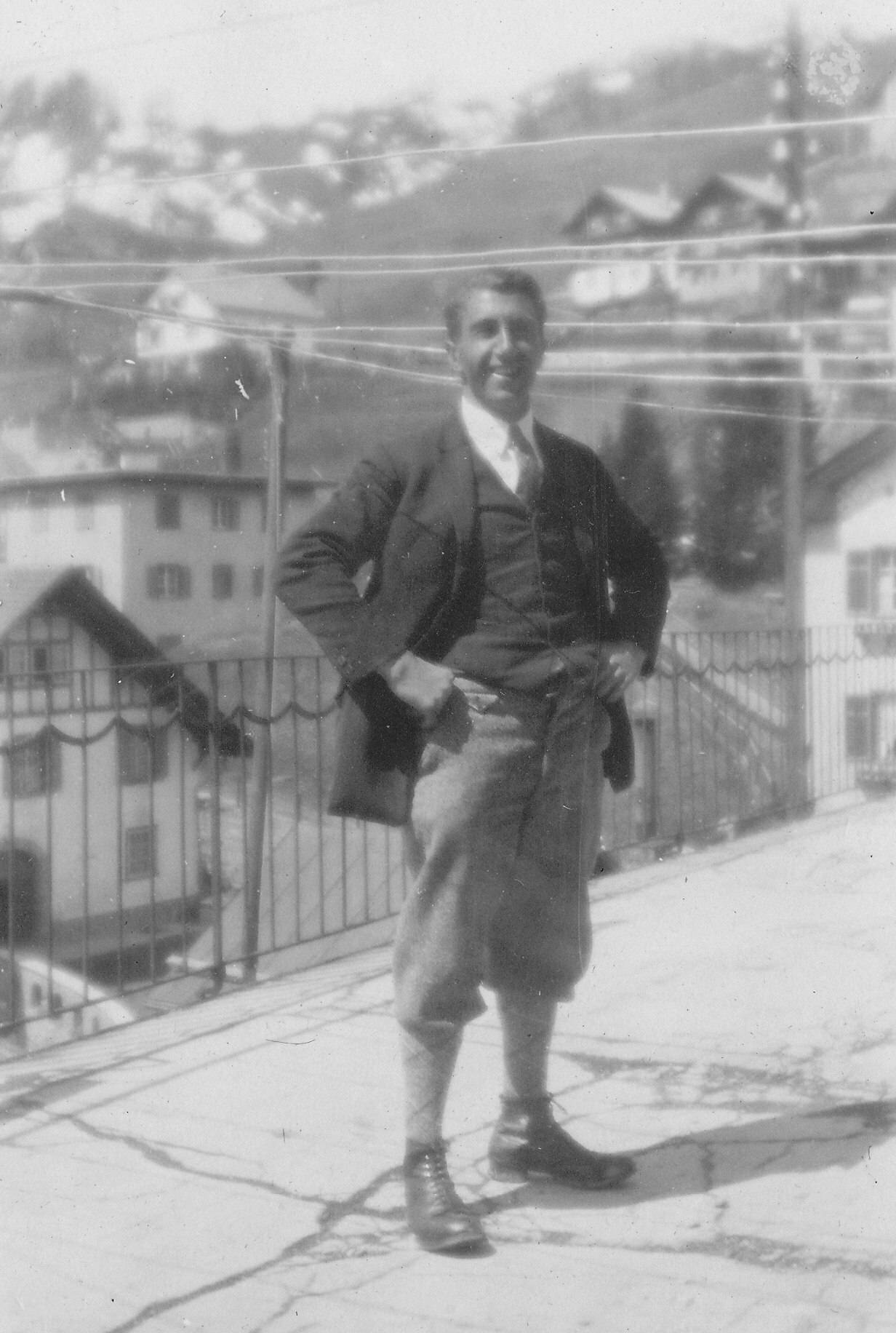
Arnold Martignoni is one of just four medal-winning Swiss goalies, winning a bronze in 1928.

Goaltenders
Player	Olympics	Tournament(s)	GP	W	L	T	Min	SO	GA	GAA	Medals	Notes	Ref(s)
David Aebischer	2	2002, 2006	6	1	1	3	281	0	13	2.77			
Olivier Anken	1	1988	4	2	1	0	220	1	10	2.73			
Hans Bänninger	2	1948, 1952	9	6	3	0	500	3	23	2.76	Bronze (1948)		
Reto Berra	1	2014	1	0	1	0	59	0	1	1.02			
Richard Bucher	1	1988	3	1	2	0	140	0	8	3.43			
Christian Conrad	1	1956	3	0	2	0	163	0	18	6.63			
Charles Fasel	1	1928	4	2	1	1	155	1	4	1.55	Bronze (1928)		
Edouard Filliol	1	1924	1	0	1	0	59	0	9	9.15			
Martin Gerber	2	2002, 2006	6	3	2	0	318	1	15	2.83			
Jonas Hiller	2	2010, 2014	8	4	4	0	495	2	15	1.82			
Arnold Hirtz	1	1936	1	1	0	0	45	1	0	0.00			
Andre Jorns	1	1976	4	2	2	0	240	0	16	4.00			
René Kiener	1	1964	2	0	2	0	120	0	17	8.50			
Albert Künzler	1	1936	2	0	2	0	90	0	5	3.33			
Arnold Martignoni	1	1928	3	0	1	0	70	0	17	14.57	Bronze (1928)		
Alfio Molina	2	1972, 1976	3	0	1	2	177	0	11	3.73			
Reto Pavoni	1	1992	1	0	1	0	60	0	8	8.00			
Reto Perl	1	1948	4	3	1	0	240	0	15	3.75	Bronze (1948)		
Martin Riesen	1	1956	3	1	2	0	137	0	16	7.00			
Gérald Rigolet	2	1964, 1972	8	0	7	0	422	0	49	6.97			
René Savoie	2	1920, 1924	5	0	4	0	201	0	77	22.99			
Renato Tosio	2	1988, 1992	6	2	4	0	359	0	24	4.01			
Paul Wyss	1	1952	4	1	2	0	220	0	23	6.07			

=== Reserve goaltenders ===
These goaltenders were named to the Olympic roster, but did not receive any ice time during games.

Reserve goaltenders
Player	Olympics	Medals	Ref(s)
Marco Bührer	2006		
Ronnie Rüeger	2010		
Tobias Stephan	2010, 2014		
Lars Weibel	2002		

== Skaters ==
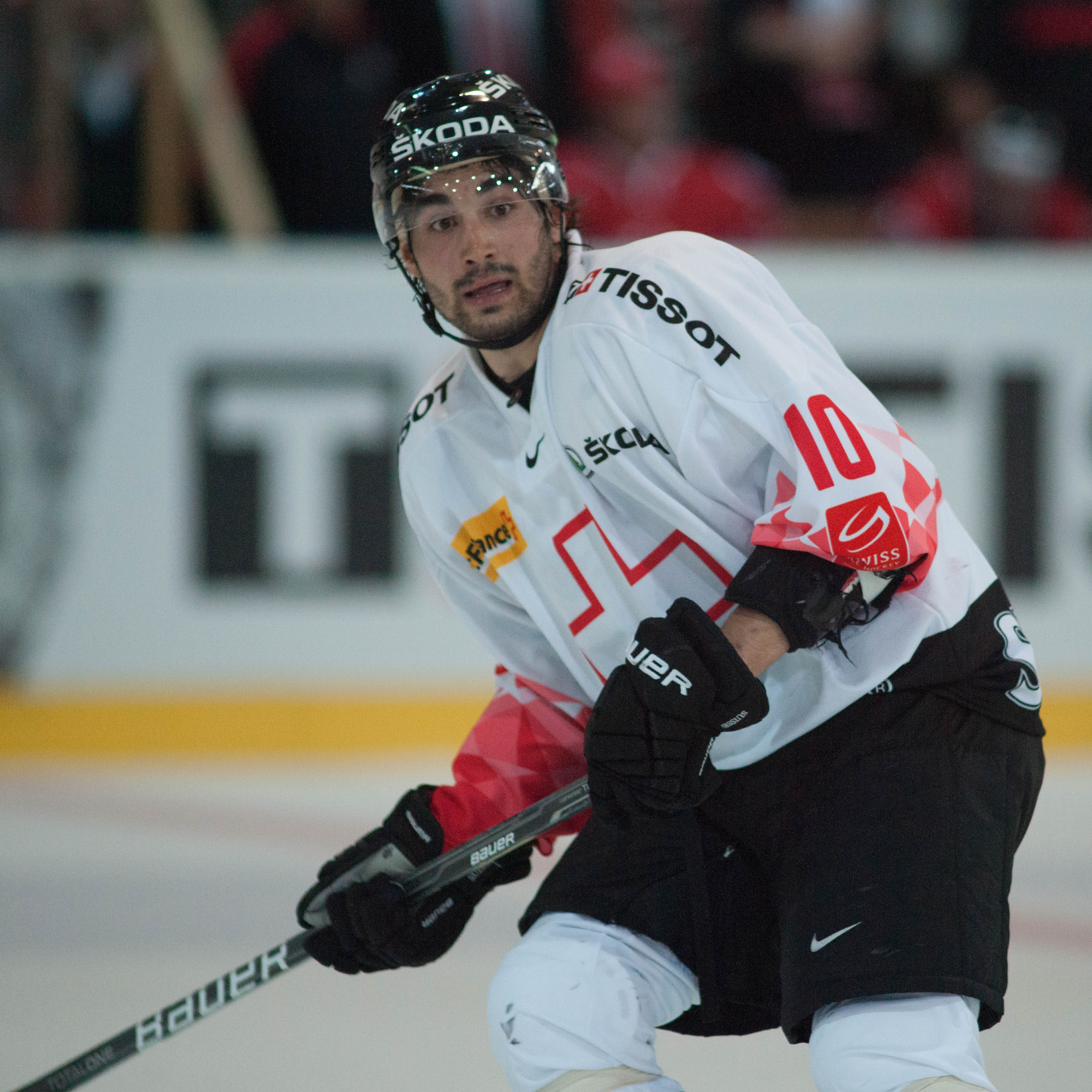
Andres Ambühl has played 10 games in three different Olympics.

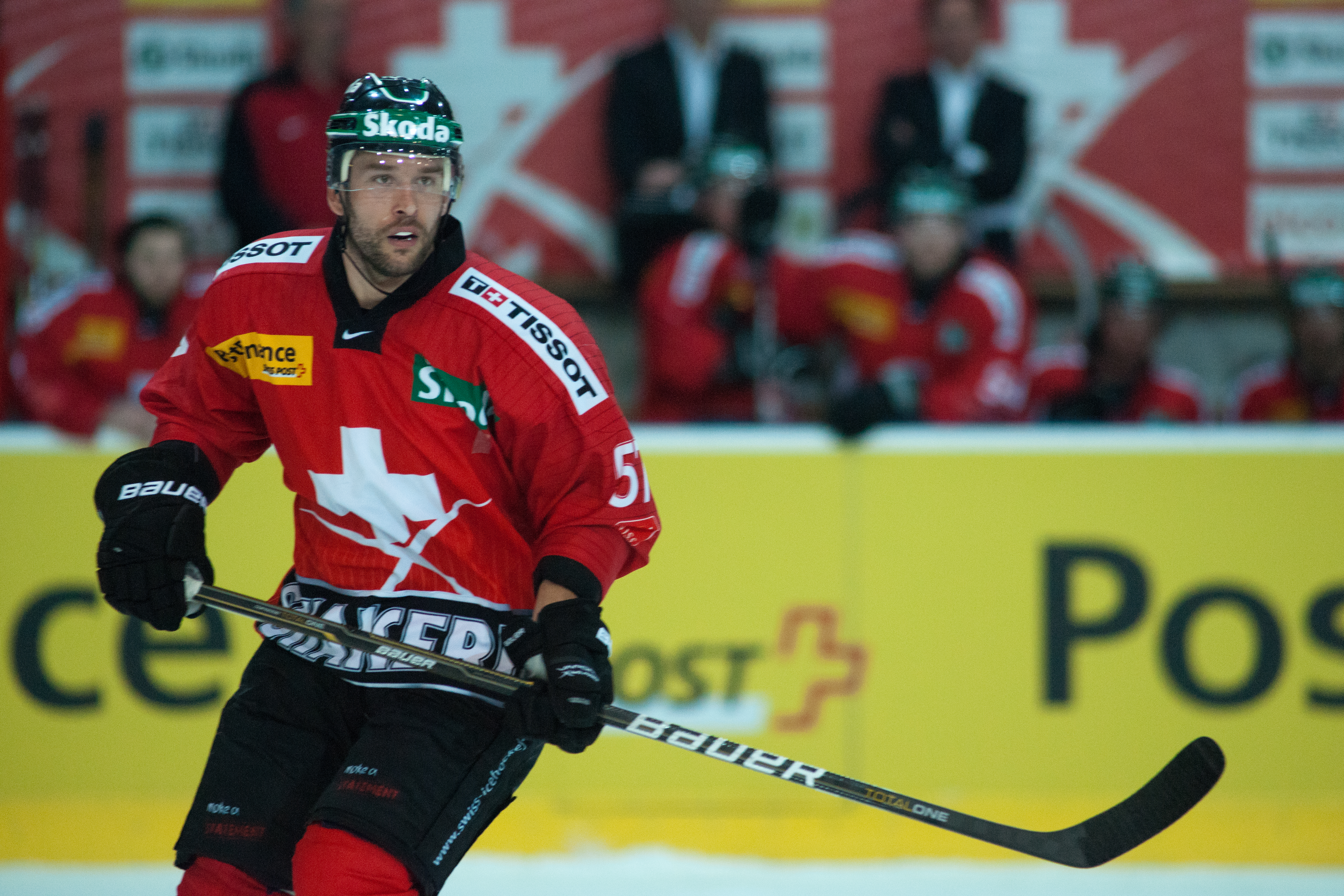
Goran Bezina scored two assists in six games during the 2006 tournament.

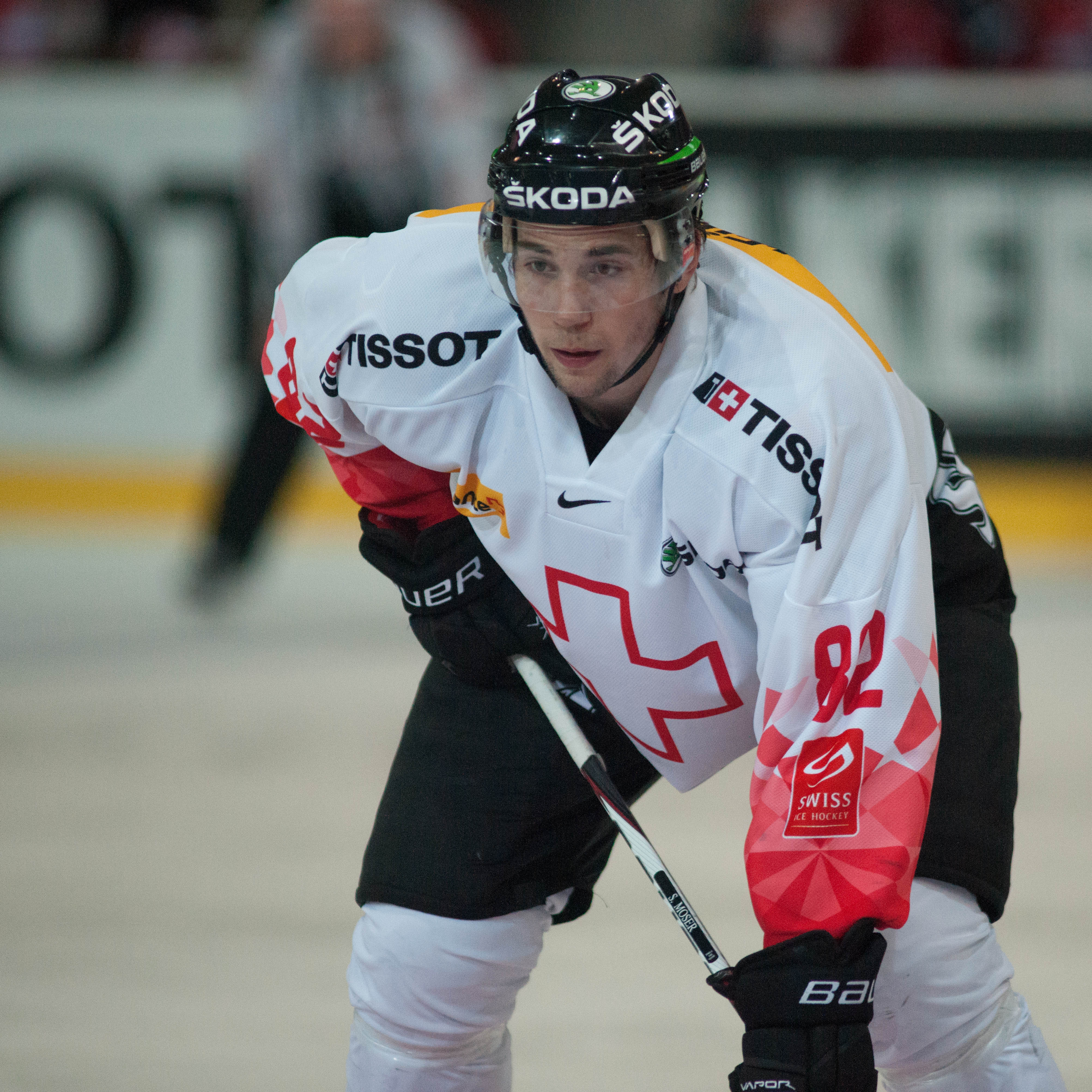
Simon Moser scored one goal in four games at the 2014 Winter Olympics.

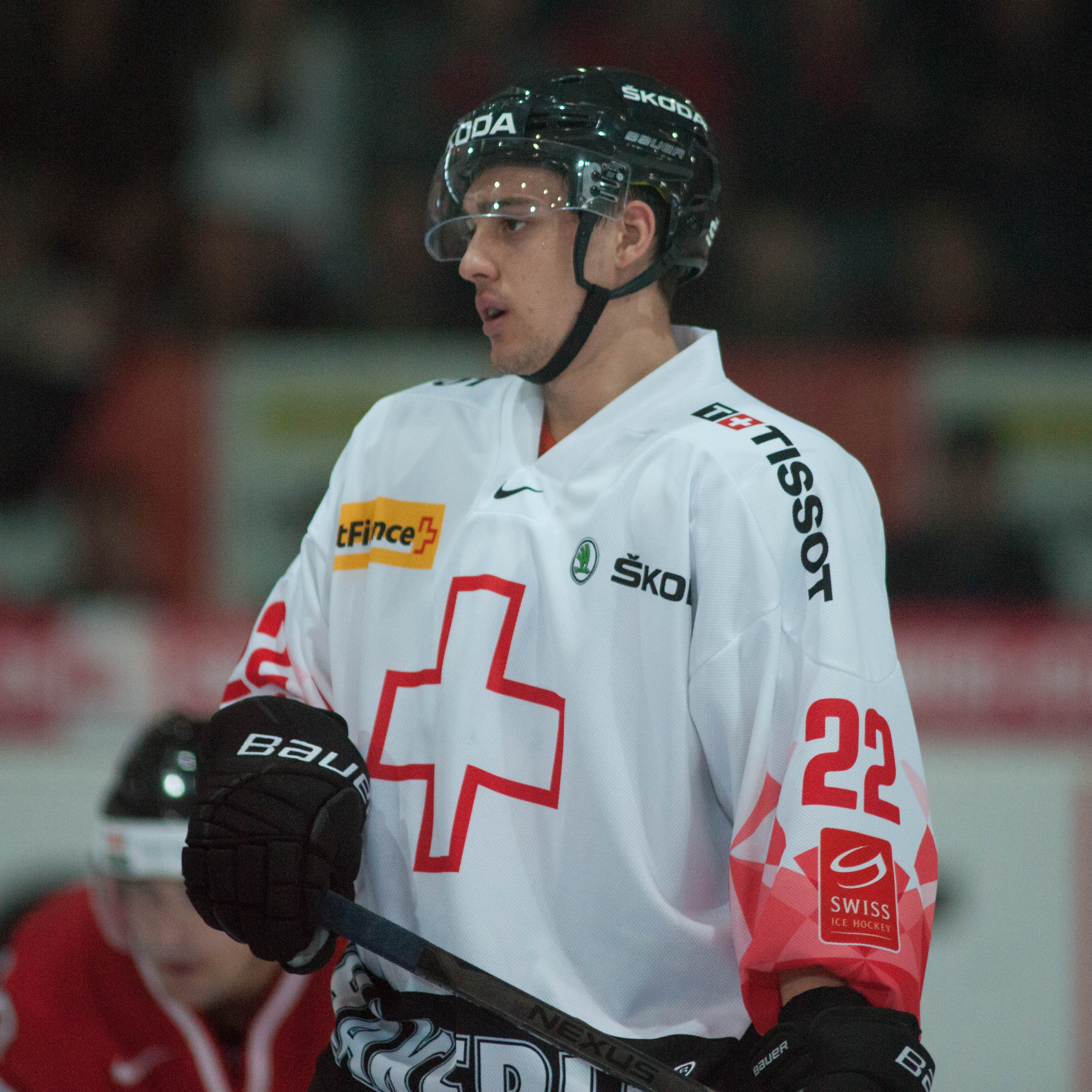
Nino Niederreiter played at the 2014 Winter Olympics.

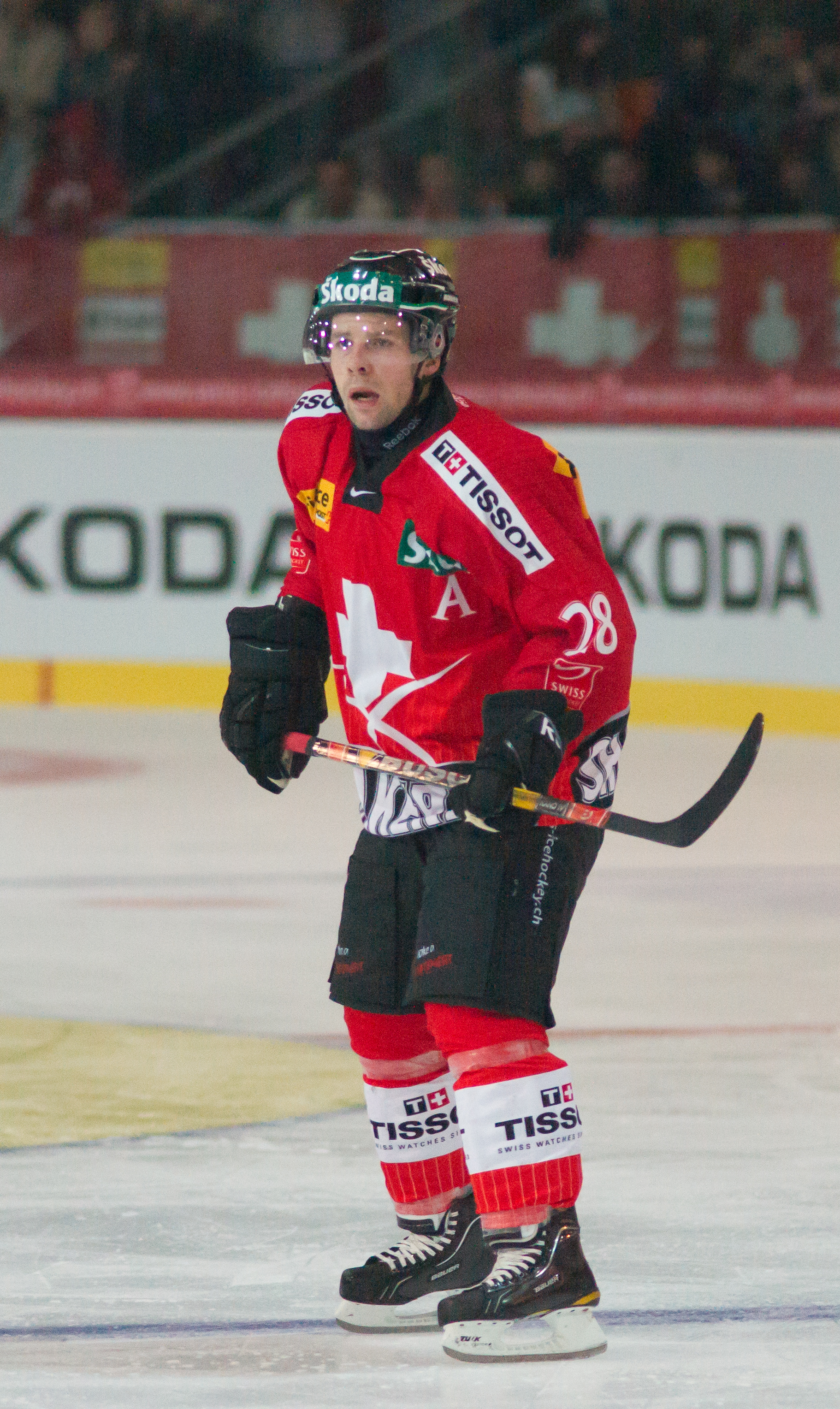
Martin Plüss is one of only three players to appear in four Olympic tournaments for Switzerland.

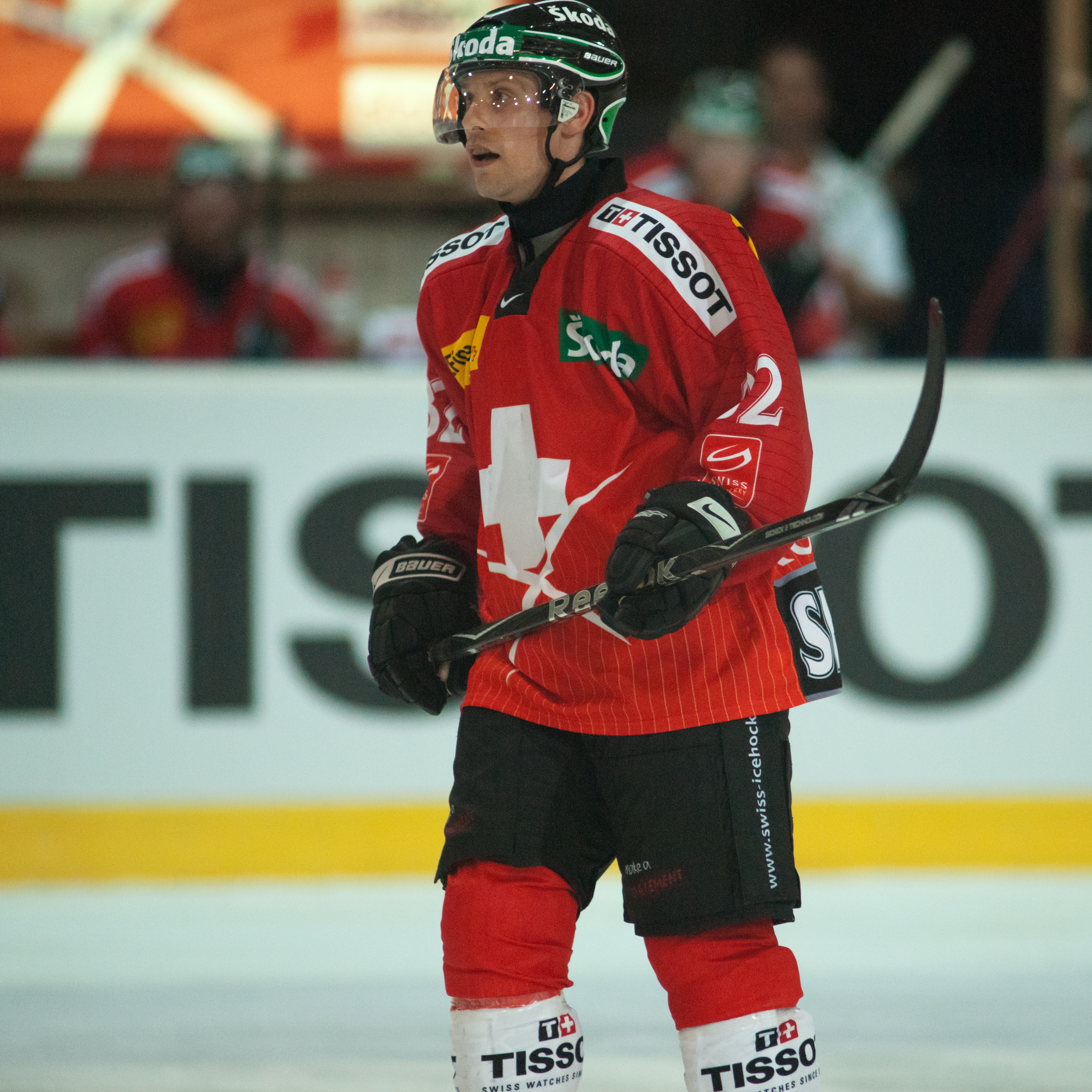
Ivo Rüthemann played in three Olympic tournaments for Switzerland.

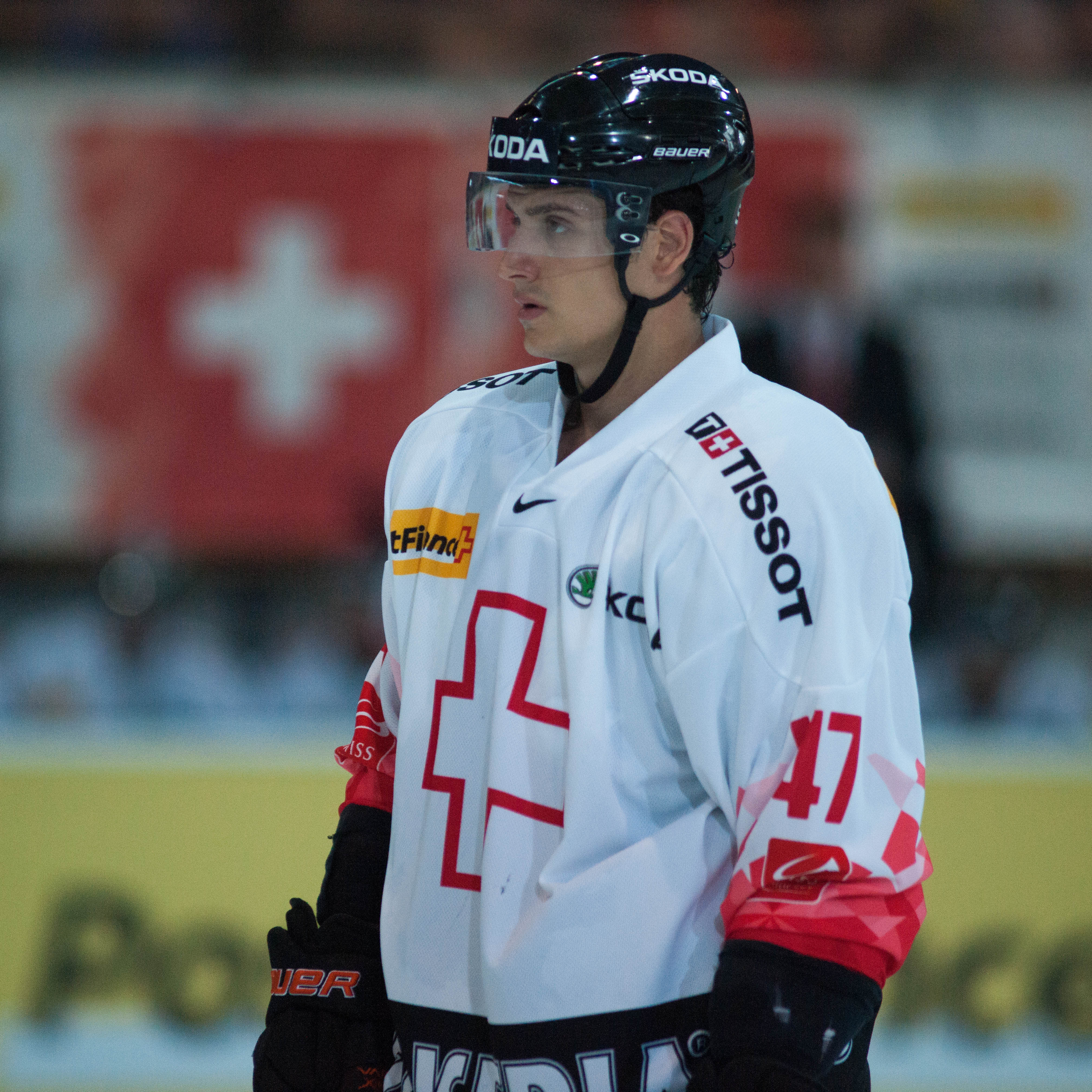
Luca Sbisa played five games at the 2010 Winter Olympics.

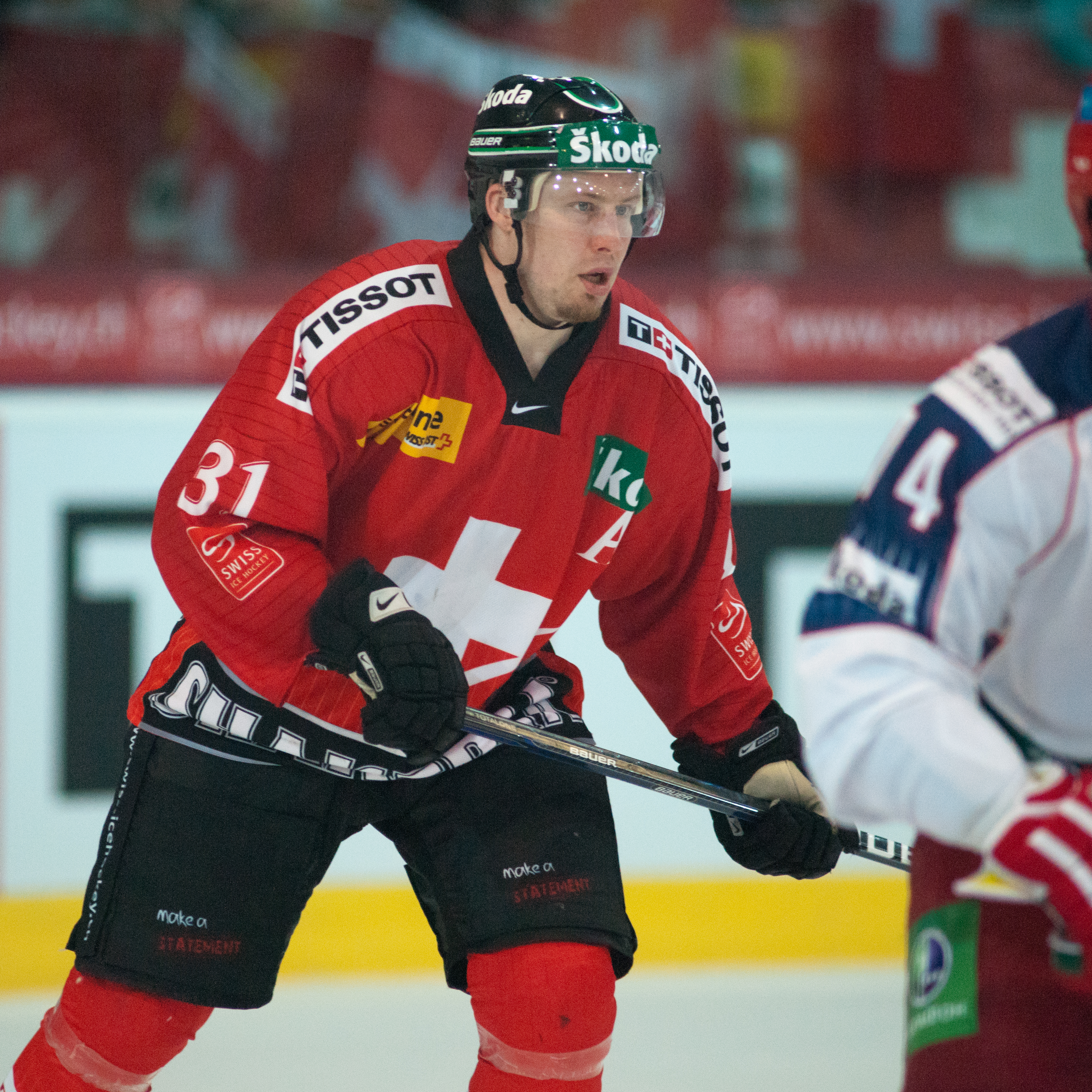
Mathias Seger has the second-most penalty minutes (22) of any Swiss player in Olympic history.

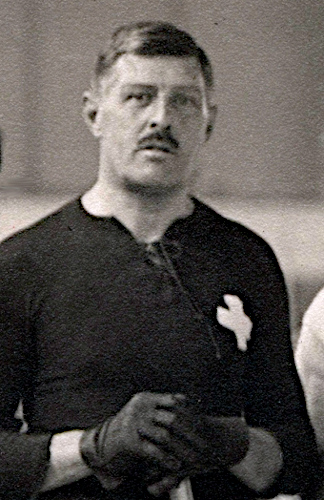
Max Sillig captained the first Swiss Olympic ice hockey team, at the 1920 Summer Olympics.

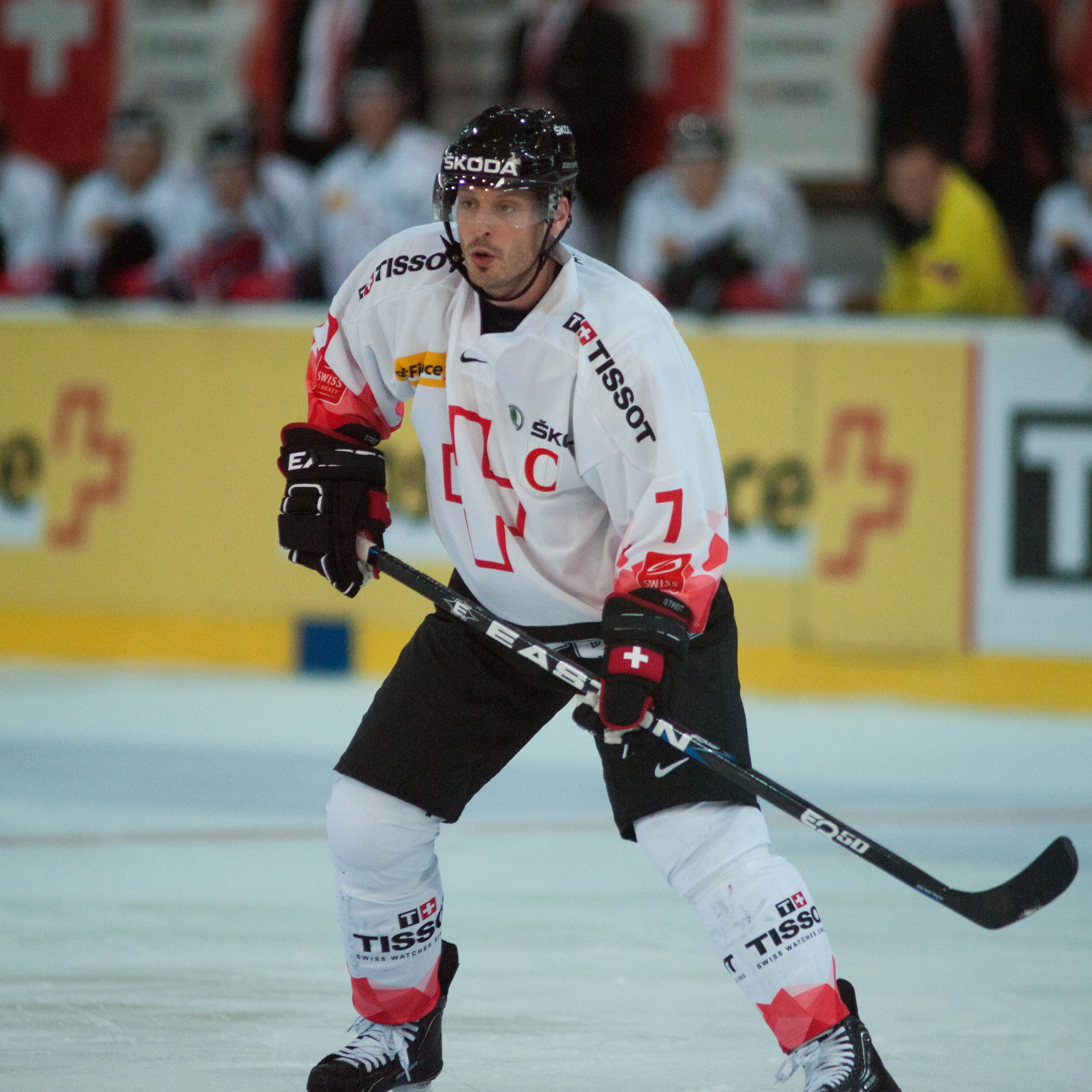
Mark Streit captained the Swiss team three times: in 2002, 2006 and 2010.

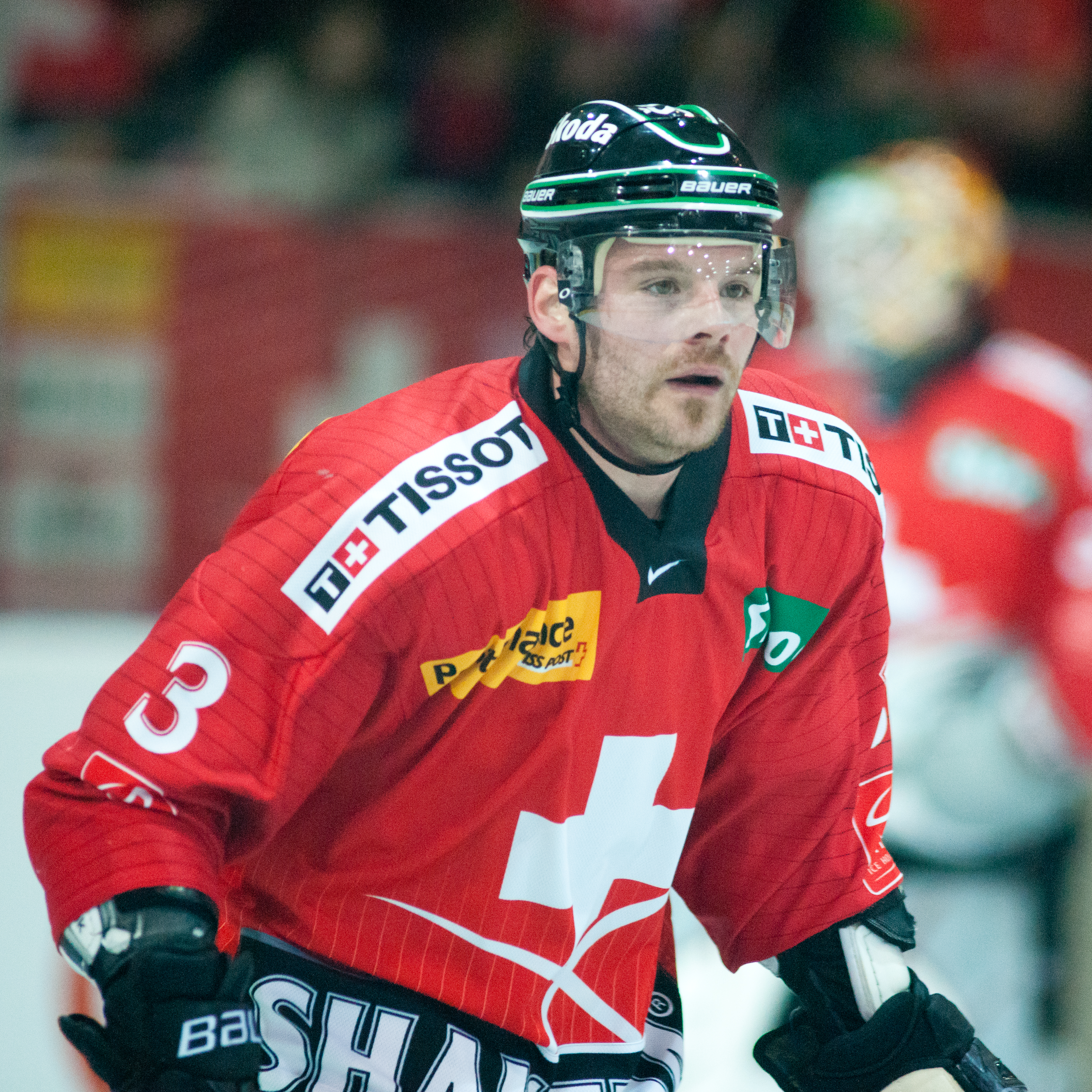
Julien Vauclair has played for Switzerland at three Olympics: 2002, 2006 and 2014.

Skaters
Player	Olympics	Tournaments	GP	G	A	P	PIM	Medals	Notes	Ref(s)
Jean-Jacques Aeschlimann	1	2002	4	3	3	6	2			
Peter Aeschlimann	1	1972	4	0	0	0	2			
Andres Ambühl	3	2006, 2010, 2014	10	0	0	0	0			
Mezzi Andreossi	1	1928	2	0	0	0	4	Bronze (1928)		
Fred Auckenthaler	1	1924	2	0	0	0	0			
Bernhard Bagnoud	1	1956	5	6	2	8	6			
Samuel Balmer	1	1992	7	3	0	3	0			
Gian Bazzi	1	1952	8	3	0	3	0			
Jürg Berger	1	1976	5	1	3	4	6			
René Berra	1	1972	4	0	0	0	0			
Franz Berry	2	1956, 1964	12	0	1	1	8			
Sandro Bertaggia	1	1992	7	0	2	2	2			
Andreas Beutler	1	1992	7	0	1	1	14			
Goran Bezina	1	2006	6	0	2	2	0			
Matthias Bieber	1	2014	4	0	0	0	0			
Alfred Bieler	1	1948	5	5	0	5	0	Bronze (1948)		
François Blank	1	1952	5	0	0	0	0			
Severin Blindenbacher	3	2006, 2010, 2014	15	1	2	3	12			
Simon Bodenmann	1	2014	3	1	0	1	0			
Heinrich Boller	1	1948	5	3	0	3	0	Bronze (1948)		
Gaetan Boucher	1	1988	6	0	1	1	8			
Patrice Brasey	2	1988, 1992	11	1	0	1	37			
Robert Breiter	1	1928	4	2	0	2	0	Bronze (1928)		
Mario Brodmann	1	1992	7	2	2	4	8			
Damien Brunner	1	2014	4	0	0	0	0			
Urs Burkart	1	1988	5	0	2	2	0			
Ferdinand Cattini	2	1936, 1948	9	1	0	1	0	Bronze (1948)	IIHFHOF (1998)	
Hans Cattini	2	1936, 1948	9	1	0	1	0	Bronze (1948)	IIHFHOF (1998)	
Bixio Celio	1	1952	4	1	0	1	0			
Manuele Celio	2	1988, 1992	13	2	1	3	0			
Roger Chappot	1	1964	7	0	0	0	8			
Björn Christen	1	2002	4	0	0	0	6			
Flavien Conne	2	2002, 2006	7	1	0	1	6			
Gian-Marco Crameri	1	2002	4	0	1	1	4			
Rodolphe Cuendet	1	1920	2	0	0	0	0			
Luca Cunti	1	2014	4	0	0	0	0			
Pietro Cunti	1	1988	2	1	1	2	2			
Patric Della Rossa	2	2002, 2006	10	0	3	3	6			
Reto Delnon	1	1952	7	0	2	2	0			
Thomas Déruns	1	2010	5	0	0	0	0			
Raphael Diaz	1	2010, 2014	9	0	0	0	8			
Rolf Diethelm	1	1964	6	1	0	1	0			
Paul DiPietro	1	2006	6	3	0	3	0			
Hnat Domenichelli	1	2010	5	1	2	3	4			
Gérard Dubi	1	1972	4	0	1	1	0			
Guy Dubois	2	1972, 1976	9	2	2	4	4			
Louis Dufour	2	1920, 1928	6	3	0	3	0	Bronze (1928)	Team Captain (1928)	
Hans Dürst	1	1948	7	5	0	5	0	Bronze (1948)		
Walter Dürst	2	1948, 1952	12	8	0	8	0	Bronze (1948)		
Walter Dürst	1	1976	4	3	2	5	0			
Jörg Eberle	2	1988, 1992	13	7	5	12	12		Team Captain (1992)	
Keith Fair	1	1992	7	2	5	7	6			
Patrick Fischer	2	2002, 2006	10	2	1	3	8			
Beat Forster	1	2006	6	0	0	0	6			
Ratus Frei	1	1956	5	0	0	0	0			
Elwyn Friedrich	1	1964	7	0	0	0	0		Team Captain (1964)	
Philippe Furrer	1	2010	5	0	1	1	2			
Gaston Furrer	2	1964, 1972	11	0	1	1	12			
Ryan Gardner	1	2014	3	0	0	0	0			
Albert Geromini	1	1928	4	1	0	1	3	Bronze (1928)		
Émile Golaz	2	1952, 1956	13	3	1	4	2			
Patrick von Gunten	2	2010, 2014	6	1	0	1	0			
Emil Handschin	3	1948, 1952, 1956	18	4	1	5	2	Bronze (1948)	Team Captain (1956)	
Otto Heller	1	1936	3	0	0	0	0			
Charles Henzen	2	1972, 1976	8	0	0	0	6		Team Captain (1976)	
Steve Hirschi	1	2006	6	0	0	0	4			
Paul Hofer	2	1952, 1956	10	0	0	0	2			
Ueli Hofmann	1	1976	5	0	1	1	4			
Martin Höhener	1	2002	4	0	0	0	0			
Denis Hollenstein	1	2014	3	0	1	1	2			
Felix Hollenstein	1	1988	6	1	1	2	2			
Max Holzboer	1	1920	1	0	0	0	0			
Renzo Holzer	1	1976	5	2	3	5	4			
Doug Honegger	1	1992	2	0	0	0	0			
Patrick Howald	1	1992	7	4	3	7	4			
Ernst Hug	1	1936	3	0	0	0	0			
René Huguenin	1	1972	3	0	1	1	0		Team Captain (1972)	
Marius Jaccard	2	1920, 1924	4	0	0	0	0			
Ernest Jacquet	1	1924	1	0	0	0	0			
Peter Jaks	2	1988, 1992	13	3	3	6	6			
Sandy Jeannin	3	2002, 2006, 2010	15	1	2	3	4			
Marcel Jenni	2	2002, 2006	8	0	0	0	4			
Heinz Jenni	1	1972	4	1	0	1	0			
Oskar Jenni	1	1964	3	0	0	0	2			
Roman Josi	1	2014	4	0	0	0	0			
Hans Keller	1	1972	4	0	0	0	0			
Olivier Keller	2	2002, 2006	10	0	1	1	12			
Ruedi Keller	1	1956	1	0	0	0	0			
Walter Keller	1	1956	5	2	1	3	2			
Charles Kessler	1	1936	3	1	0	1	0			
Dino Kessler	1	1992	7	0	0	0	10			
Herbert Kessler	1	1936	3	0	0	0	0			
Jakob Kölliker	2	1976, 1988	11	2	6	8	8		Team Captain (1988); IIHFHOF (2007)	
Fritz Kraatz	1	1928	3	0	0	0	0	Bronze (1928)		
André Künzi	2	1988, 1992	9	0	0	0	4			
Peter Lehmann	1	1972	3	1	0	1	0			
Romano Lemm	2	2006, 2010	11	4	0	4	10			
Marc Leuenberger	1	1988	6	0	0	0	0			
Sven Leuenberger	1	1992	7	1	0	1	8			
Bruno Leuzinger	2	1920, 1924	1	0	0	0	0			
Paul Lob	1	1920	2	0	0	0	0			
Heini Lohrer	1	1948	7	11	0	11	0	Bronze (1948)		
Werner Lohrer	1	1948	3	2	0	2	0	Bronze (1948)		
Alfred Lüthi	2	1988, 1992	13	2	6	8	18			
Ernst Lüthi	1	1976	4	1	0	1	2			
Adolf Martignoni	1	1936	1	0	0	0	0			
Nando Mathieu	1	1976	5	3	2	5	2			
Georg Mattli	1	1976	5	0	0	0	0			
Fausto Mazzoleni	1	1988	6	3	0	3	2			
Heini Meng	1	1928	3	1	0	1	4	Bronze (1928)		
Andreas Meyer	1	1976	5	0	1	1	4			
Thibaut Monnet	1	2010	5	0	1	1	0			
Gil Montandon	2	1988, 1992	11	1	2	3	6			
Anton Morosani	1	1928	4	1	0	1	0	Bronze (1928)		
Simon Moser	1	2014	4	1	0	1	2			
Ernest Mottier	1	1924	3	0	0	0	0			
Paul Müller	1	1924	3	0	0	0	0			
Fritz Naef	1	1956	5	6	2	8	4			
Bernhard Neininger	1	1976	5	2	0	2	6			
Anton Neininger	2	1972, 1976	9	6	2	8	6			
Philipp Neuenschwander	1	1988	6	0	3	3	2			
Nino Niederreiter	1	2014	4	0	0	0	2			
Hans Ott	1	1956	5	1	0	1	4			
Hans Pappa	1	1956	4	0	0	0	0			
Pio Parolini	1	1964	7	3	0	3	0			
Thierry Paterlini	2	2006, 2010	11	1	1	2	12			
Kurt Peter	1	1956	5	0	0	0	2			
Kurt Pfammatter	1	1964	7	1	1	2	2			
Willy Pfister	1	1952	8	1	2	3	0			
Thomas Pleisch	1	1936	1	0	0	0	0			
Martin Plüss	4	2002, 2006, 2010, 2014	19	3	6	9	10			
Gebhard Poltera	2	1948, 1952	14	6	5	11	0	Bronze (1948)		
Ulrich Poltera	2	1948, 1952	14	21	3	24	0	Bronze (1948)	Team Captain (1952)	
Jacques Pousaz	1	1972	4	0	2	2	0			
Paul Probst	1	1972	4	0	0	0	0			
Francis Reinhard	1	1972	4	1	2	3	0			
Georg Riesch	1	1956	4	0	0	0	10			
Andreas Ritsch	1	1988	6	1	1	2	4			
Bruno Rogger	1	1988	6	3	1	4	10			
Kevin Romy	1	2014	4	0	1	1	0			
André Rötheli	2	1992, 2002	11	1	3	4	6			
Mario Rottaris	1	1992	7	2	1	3	4			
Luzius Rüedi	1	1928	3	0	0	0	2	Bronze (1928)		
Beat Rüedi	1	1948	5	2	0	2	0	Bronze (1948)		
Max Rüegg	1	1964	7	0	0	0	0			
Ivo Rüthemann	3	2002, 2006, 2010	15	3	3	6	2			
Edgar Salis	1	2002	2	0	0	0	0			
Walter Salzmann	1	1964	7	0	0	0	2			
Raffaele Sannitz	1	2010	5	1	1	2	8			
Luca Sbisa	1	2010	5	0	0	0	0			
Peter Schlagenhauf	1	1988	6	2	0	2	0			
Otto Schläpfer	2	1952, 1956	13	2	0	2	8			
Oskar Schmidt	1	1936	2	0	0	0	0			
Otto Schubiger	2	1948, 1952	9	8	1	9	0	Bronze (1948)		
Mathias Seger	4	2002, 2006, 2010, 2014	19	0	4	4	22		Team Captain (2014)	
Marcel Sgualdo	1	1972	3	0	1	1	5			
Walter von Siebenthal	1	1924	3	0	0	0	0		Team Captain (1924)	
Max Sillig	1	1920	2	0	0	0	0		Team Captain (1920)	
Julien Sprunger	1	2010	5	2	0	2	2			
Peter Stammbach	1	1964	7	0	3	3	0			
Martin Steinegger	1	2002	4	0	0	0	6			
Mark Streit	4	2002, 2006, 2010, 2014	19	3	6	9	8		Team Captain (2002, 2006, 2010)	
Alfred Streun	1	1952	4	0	0	0	0			
Reto Suri	1	2014	3	0	1	1	2			
Patrick Sutter	1	2002	4	0	2	2	6			
Andreas Ton	1	1992	6	0	0	0	2			
Bibi Torriani	3	1928, 1936, 1948	11	3	0	3	0	Bronze (1928); Bronze (1948)	Team Captain (1936, 1948); IIHFHOF (1997)	
Morris Trachsler	1	2014	3	0	0	0	2			
Hans-Martin Trepp	2	1948, 1952	14	18	3	21	0	Bronze (1948)		
Herold Truffer	1	1964	7	1	1	2	2			
Rolf Tschiemer	1	1976	5	3	3	6	2			
Michel Turler	1	1972	4	4	0	4	6			
Donald Unger	1	1924	2	1	0	1	0			
Julien Vauclair	3	2002, 2006, 2014	14	1	0	1	10			
André Verdeil	1	1924	3	1	0	1	0			
Reto Von Arx	1	2002	2	0	1	1	0			
Thomas Vrabec	2	1988, 1992	13	2	6	8	18			
Roman Wäger	1	1988	6	1	0	1	4			
Yannick Weber	2	2010, 2014	9	0	0	0	8			
Sepp Weingärtner	1	1956	1	0	0	0	0			
Peter Wespi	1	1964	7	1	0	1	2			
Adrian Wichser	1	2006	6	0	0	0	2			
Roman Wick	2	2010, 2014	9	2	3	5	8			
Daniel Widmer	1	1976	5	1	2	3	0			
Otto Wittwer	1	1964	7	0	0	0	2			
Aldo Zenhäusern	1	1976	5	1	0	1	0			
Thomas Ziegler	1	2006	5	1	0	1	8			
Jürg Zimmermann	1	1964	5	2	0	2	2			

== See also ==
- Switzerland men's national ice hockey team
