= Hirtz =

Hirtz is a surname. Notable people with the surname include:

- Alexander Charles Hirtz (born 1945), botanist
- Arnold Hirtz (1910–1993), Swiss ice hockey player
- Georg Daniel Hirtz (1804–1893), Alsatian master turner and poet

== See also ==
- Hirtz compass, a medical device
