= Martignoni =

Martignoni is an Italian surname. Notable people with the surname include:

- Adolf Martignoni (1909–1989), Swiss ice hockey player
- Antoinette Martignoni (1918–2018), American artist
- Arnold Martignoni (1901–1984), Swiss ice hockey player
- Bruno Martignoni (born 1992), Swiss footballer
