= Carl Josefsson =

Carl Josefsson may refer to:

- Carl Josefsson (ice hockey) (1895–1974), Swedish ice hockey player
- Carl Josefsson (judge), former Swedish judge and current president of the Boards of Appeal of the European Patent Office
