= Ferdinand Cattini =

Swiss ice hockey player

- Born: 27 September 1916 Grono, Switzerland
- Died: 17 August 1969 (aged 52) Davos, Switzerland
- Position: Left Wing
- National team: Switzerland
- Playing career: 1931–1949

Medal record

Ice hockey

Olympic Games
Bronze medal – third place	1948 St. Moritz	

World Championships
Silver medal – second place	1935 Switzerland	
Bronze medal – third place	1937 Great Britain	
Bronze medal – third place	1939 Switzerland	

Ferdinand "Pic" Cattini (27 September 1916 in Grono, Switzerland – 17 August 1969 in Davos, Switzerland) was a Swiss ice hockey player who competed in the 1936 Winter Olympics and 1948 Winter Olympics. He was inducted into the IIHF Hall of Fame in 1998, with his brother Hans Cattini.

== Personal life ==
Cattini was born on 27 September 1916 in Grono, Switzerland. He grew up alongside his brother Hans Cattini. He was nicknamed "Pic" due to his short stature. He worked as an electrician tradesman in Davos, Switzerland for teammate Albert Geromini.

== Playing career ==
Starting in 1933, Cattini, his brother, and Bibi Torriani played on a forward line known as "The ni-storm" (German: Der ni-sturm), for HC Davos. The line was named for the last syllable (-ni) of players' surnames. The ni-storm was regarded as the top line of HC Davos and Switzerland's national hockey team. As a member of HC Davos, "The ni-storm" won 15 Swiss championship titles. This line consistently competed against Gebhard Poltera and his line from EHC Arosa. Cattini developed a reputation as an on ice enforcer. He retired from HC Davos in 1956 and took over coaching duties from 1952 to 1962.

He was inducted into the International Ice Hockey Federation Hall of Fame in 1998.

=== International play ===
In 1936, he participated with the Swiss ice hockey team in the Winter Olympics tournament. He was the scoring leader with Josef Maleček at the 1939 Ice Hockey World Championships where Switzerland won bronze and the European Championship. In 1948, he participated with the Swiss ice hockey team in the Winter Olympics tournament where he won a bronze medal. During the tournament, Switzerland held a 6–2 record. In total, Cattini won six European Championships. He also participated in two Olympic Games and seven IIHF World Championships.

In 2019, Patrik Laine surpassed Cattini's record for most goals scored by an 18-year-old at the IIHF World Championship.

== Death and legacy ==
He died at the age of 52 from a long-term illness. The Spengler Cup dedicated a division in his name.

In 2020, he was introduced into the IIHF All-Time Switzerland Team.

== Playing statistics ==
=== International play ===
Per stats available on eliteprospect.com

=== International ===
Year	Team	Event	Result	GP	G	A	Pts	PIM
1933	Switzerland	WC		6	2	0	2	–
1934	Switzerland	WC		8	10	0	10	–
1936	Switzerland	OLY		3	0	0	0	–
1948	Switzerland	OLY		7	1	1	2	2
Senior totals				107	92	0	92	0

== See also ==
List of Olympic men's ice hockey players for Switzerland
