= Hans Cattini =

Swiss ice hockey player

- Born: 24 January 1914 Grono, Switzerland
- Died: 2 April 1987 (aged 73) Lausanne, Switzerland
- Position: Center
- National team: Switzerland
- Playing career: 1930–1950

Medal record

Ice hockey

Olympic Games
Bronze medal – third place	1948 St. Moritz	

World Championships
Bronze medal – third place	1937 Great Britain	
Bronze medal – third place	1939 Switzerland	

Johann Joseph Cattini (24 January 1914 – 2 April 1987) was a Swiss ice hockey player who competed in the 1936 Winter Olympics and 1948 Winter Olympics. He was inducted into the IIHF Hall of Fame in 1998, with his brother Ferdinand Cattini.

== Personal life ==
Cattini was born on 24 January 1914 in Grono, Switzerland to Giovanni, who was a carpenter. He grew up alongside his younger brother Ferdinand Cattini. He worked as an electrician tradesman in Davos, Switzerland for teammate Albert Geromini.

== Playing career ==
Starting in 1933, Cattini, his brother, and Bibi Torriani played on a forward line known as "The ni-storm" (German: Der ni-sturm), for HC Davos. The line was named for the last syllable (-ni) of players' surnames. The ni-storm was regarded as the top line of HC Davos and Switzerland's national hockey team. As a member of HC Davos, "The ni-storm" won 15 Swiss championship titles. This line consistently competed against Gebhard Poltera and his line from EHC Arosa.

He was inducted into the International Ice Hockey Federation Hall of Fame in 1998.

He died on 2 April 1987.

== International play ==
In 1936, he participated with the Swiss ice hockey team in the Winter Olympics tournament. In 1948, he participated with the Swiss ice hockey team in the Winter Olympics tournament where he won a bronze medal. In total, the brothers were at seven IIHF World Championships between 1933 and 1949.

== See also ==
- List of Olympic men's ice hockey players for Switzerland
