= Jacques Plante Trophy =

The Jacques Plante Trophy is awarded annually to the best ice hockey goaltender in Switzerland as voted on by a jury consisting of the captains and the coaches of the teams in the Nationalliga A. The Jacques Plante Trophy was donated in 1986 by legendary Canadian goaltender Jacques Plante's widow Caroline R. Plante, who resides in the canton of Valais, Switzerland.

== Jacques Plante Trophy Winners ==
- 2024 Simon Hrubec, ZSC Lions
- 2023 Robert Mayer, Genève-Servette HC
- 2022 Leonardo Genoni, EV Zug
- 2021 Leonardo Genoni, EV Zug
- 2020 not awarded
- 2019 Leonardo Genoni, SC Bern
- 2018 Elvis Merzļikins, HC Lugano
- 2017 Leonardo Genoni, SC Bern
- 2016 Elvis Merzļikins, HC Lugano
- 2015 Leonardo Genoni, SC Bern
- 2014 Cristobal Huet, Lausanne HC
- 2013 Reto Berra, EHC Biel
- 2012 Reto Berra, EHC Biel
- 2011 Leonardo Genoni, HC Davos
- 2010 Tobias Stephan, Genève-Servette HC
- 2009 Ronnie Rüeger, Kloten Flyers
- 2008 Ari Sulander, ZSC Lions
- 2007 Jonas Hiller, HC Davos
- 2006 Daniel Manzato, EHC Basel
- 2005 Jonas Hiller, HC Davos
- 2004 Marco Bührer, SC Bern
- 2003 Lars Weibel, HC Davos
- 2002 Lars Weibel, HC Davos
- 2001 Cristobal Huet, HC Lugano
- 2000 Cristobal Huet, HC Lugano
- 1999 Ari Sulander, ZSC Lions
- 1998 Thomas Östlund, HC Fribourg-Gottéron
- 1997 Renato Tosio, SC Bern
- 1996 Reto Pavoni, EHC Kloten
- 1995 Lars Weibel, HC Lugano
- 1994 Dino Stecher, HC Fribourg-Gottéron
- 1993 Reto Pavoni, EHC Kloten
- 1992 Pauli Jaks, HC Ambri-Piotta
- 1991 Renato Tosio, SC Bern
- 1990 Renato Tosio, SC Bern
- 1989 Renato Tosio, SC Bern
- 1988 Reto Pavoni, EHC Kloten
- 1987 Richard Bucher, HC Davos
