= Albert Künzler =

Swiss ice hockey player

- Born: 9 February 1911 Davos, Switzerland
- Died: April 11, 1982 (aged 71)
- Position: Goaltender
- Played for: HC Davos; Zürcher SC
- National team: Switzerland
- Playing career: 1927–1941

Albert Künzler (9 February 1911 – 11 April 1982) was a Swiss ice hockey player who competed in the 1936 Winter Olympics.

In 1936 he participated with the Swiss ice hockey team in the Winter Olympics tournament.

== See also ==
- List of Olympic men's ice hockey players for Switzerland
