= Bernhard Bagnoud =

Swiss ice hockey player (1932–2019)

- Born: 10 February 1932 Lausanne, Switzerland
- Died: 8 January 2019 (aged 86) La Tour-de-Peilz, Switzerland
- Position: Forward
- National team: Switzerland
- Playing career: 1956–1956

Bernhard Bagnoud (10 February 1932 – 8 January 2019) was a Swiss ice hockey player who competed in the 1956 Winter Olympics.

In 1956, he participated with the Swiss ice hockey team in the Winter Olympics tournament.

Bagnoud died in La Tour-de-Peilz on 8 January 2019, at the age of 86.

== See also ==
- List of Olympic men's ice hockey players for Switzerland
