= Elvis Merzļikins =

Latvian ice hockey player (born 1994)

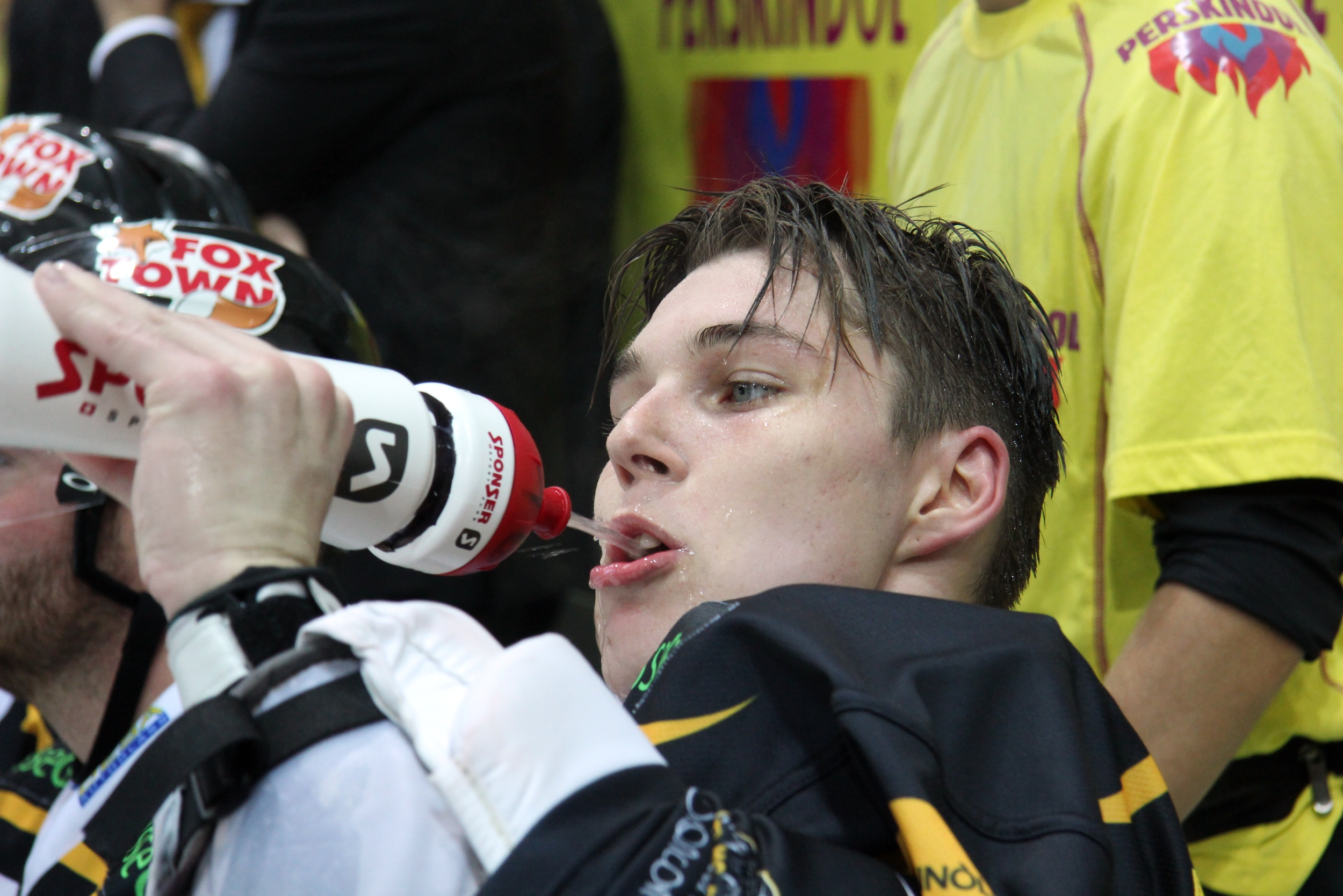
- Merzļikins with HC Lugano in 2014
- Born: 13 April 1994 (age 32) Riga, Latvia
- Height: 6 ft 3 in (191 cm)
- Weight: 181 lb (82 kg; 12 st 13 lb)
- Position: Goaltender
- Catches: Left
- NHL team Former teams: Toronto Maple Leafs; HC Lugano; Columbus Blue Jackets
- National team: Latvia
- NHL draft: 76th overall, 2014; Columbus Blue Jackets
- Playing career: 2013–present

Elvis Merzļikins (Latvian pronunciation: [ɛlːvis mɛrzˈʎikins]; born 13 April 1994) is a Latvian professional ice hockey player who is a goaltender for the Toronto Maple Leafs of the National Hockey League (NHL).

Merzļikins spent several years playing hockey in Switzerland for HC Lugano, and was awarded the Jacques Plante Trophy as best goaltender in the National League in both 2016 and 2018. Drafted 76th overall by the Blue Jackets in the 2014 NHL entry draft, Merzļikins moved to North America in 2019 and made his NHL debut that year.

Internationally Merzļikins has represented Latvia at the junior and senior level in multiple tournaments.

== Playing career ==
=== Switzerland ===
Merzļikins joined HC Lugano in 2009, September which allowed him to play in the National League (NL) with a Swiss player license and not count as an import player. Merzļikins made his NL debut with HC Lugano during the 2012–13 season on 28 September 2013 in a 2–1 victory over Lausanne HC. At the end of the 2013–14 season, Merzļikins was voted off as NL Media Most Improved Player and NL Youngster of the Year. Merzļikins was selected by the Columbus Blue Jackets of the National Hockey League (NHL) in the third round, 76th overall, of the 2014 NHL entry draft.

In the 2015–16 season, Merzļikins enjoyed a breakout year after leading the league in saves (1,484) and ranking second in save percentage and fifth in wins with a 23–13–4 record in 44 contests. In the 2016 NLA playoffs, Merzļikins led HC Lugano to the NL final which they would eventually lose in five games to SC Bern. He posted a .937 save percentage and 2.32 goals against average in 15 playoffs games. His standout season was acknowledged by claiming the Jacques Plante Trophy as the league's best goalie.

On 22 June 2016, he agreed to a three-year contract extension with Lugano, without an NHL out-clause. At the 2016 Spengler Cup, he was named to the tournament's all-star team. In the 2017–18 season, Merzļikins captured his second Jacques Plante Trophy as the league's Goaltender of the Year after finishing fourth in wins and fifth in saver percentage with a 19–15–1 record in 40 contests. Merzļikins returned for his sixth and last season under contract with HC Lugano in the 2018–19 campaign. He posted a 22–18–0 record with a 2.44 goals against average (GAA), .921 save percentage (SV%) and a career-high five shutouts in 43 games.

=== Columbus Blue Jackets ===
At the conclusion of the season with HC Lugano, Merzļikins left Switzerland and agreed to immediately join the Columbus Blue Jackets for the remainder of their season, signing a one-year, entry-level contract, on 20 March 2019. After his arrival he worked with the team during their run in the 2019 NHL playoffs.

His NHL debut came on 5 October 2019 against the Pittsburgh Penguins. Merzļikins allowed seven goals in the game, earning the loss. He was sent down to the Blue Jackets American Hockey League (AHL) affiliate, the Cleveland Monsters, on 6 November, later making one appearance with the Monsters before returning to the Blue Jackets. Towards the end of 2019, Merzļikins was not getting many starts, as he had yet to win a game in the NHL. Due to an injury to Joonas Korpisalo on 30 December, Merzļikins started the 31 December game and earned his first NHL win against the Florida Panthers, where he allowed one goal on 37 shots and helped Columbus to a 4–1 victory. On 11 January 2020, Merzļikins recorded his first career NHL shutout in a 3–0 win over the Vegas Golden Knights. He finished the season playing in 33 games with a record of 13 wins, 9 losses and 8 overtime losses with 5 shutouts. The Blue Jackets made the 2020 NHL playoffs and were eliminated by the Tampa Bay Lightning in the second round. At the end of the season, Merzļikins was named to the NHL's All-Rookie Team, the third member of the Blue Jackets to earn the honour.

In the following offseason on 23 April 2020, the Blue Jackets signed Merzļikins to a two-year contract extension. In the COVID-19 pandemic-shortened season of 2020–21, Merzļikins played well with a 2.77 goals against average and a save percentage of .916, but the Blue Jackets could not score and the team missed the playoffs.

During the offseason, while attending a 4 July 2021 party, an errant firework killed fellow Blue Jackets goalie, and Merzļikins' friend, Matīss Kivlenieks, a party that Merzļikins and his wife were also attending. Merzļikins stated that Kivlenieks had saved the lives of his wife and unborn son at the time. Later that summer, on 21 September 2021, Merzļikins signed a five-year, $27 million contract extension with the Blue Jackets. During the following 2021–22 season he struggled; he won more games than he lost, but his individual stats ballooned, with a goals against average of 3.22 save percentage of .907. The Blue Jackets missed the playoffs again.

In 2022–23 season, Merzļikins missed time with various injuries playing in only 30 games. His statistics continued to decline, with a goals against average of 3.57 and a save percentage of .876. The Blue Jackets again missed the playoffs, with goaltending now considered an issue for the team. During the following offseason, the Blue Jackets terminated the contract of goalie coach Manny Legace and brought in a new coach, Niklas Bäckström, and tasked the new coach with getting Merzļikins back to the player he was in his first two seasons.

On 28 September 2026, Merzļikins was traded to the Toronto Maple Leafs alongside teammates Kirill Marchenko and Miles Wood.

== International play ==
Merzļikins participated in the 2012 and 2013 World Junior Championships as a member of the Latvia junior team. He was selected to the Latvia senior team for the 2016 World Championship, and made his debut in the opening game against Sweden in a 2–1 overtime loss. Merzļikins also played in the 2017 and 2018 World Championships. In the 2018 tournament, he posted a 1.50 goals against average and .940 save percentage in six contests.

== Personal life ==
Merzļikins was born in Riga, Latvia. Merzļikins was named after Elvis Presley, of whom his father was a fan. Merzļikins is fluent in Latvian, English, Russian and Italian languages. Merzļikins and his wife have two sons. Their first son, born August 2021, is named after former teammate and countryman Matīss Kivlenieks, who died in a fireworks accident on 4 July 2021, protecting Merzļikins and his family. Their second son, born in March 2025, is named after late teammate Johnny Gaudreau, who, along with his younger brother, Matthew Gaudreau, was killed by a drunk driver while riding their bicycles in August 2024.

In April 2022, Merzļikins revealed that the cannon blasts used during Columbus home games triggered anxiety because they reminded him of the fireworks accident that killed Kivlenieks. He stated that the arena cannons were "a problem" for him during the first games of the season and that New Year's fireworks also affected him.

== Career statistics ==
=== Regular season and playoffs ===
			Regular season									Playoffs
Season	Team	League	GP	W	L	T/OT	MIN	GA	SO	GAA	SV%	GP	W	L	MIN	GA	SO	GAA	SV%
2011–12	HC Lugano	Elite. A	8	—	—	—	—	—	—	3.52	—	3	—	—	—	—	—	5.07	—
2012–13	HC Lugano	Elite. A	30	—	—	—	—	—	—	2.76	—	4	—	—	—	—	—	3.84	—
2013–14	HC Lugano	Elite. A	12	—	—	—	—	—	—	2.07	—	10	—	—	—	—	—	1.68	—
2013–14	HC Lugano	NLA	22	11	10	0	1,269	45	1	2.13	.925	1	0	1	80	1	0	0.75	.976
2014–15	HC Lugano	NLA	21	11	7	1	1,309	57	1	2.61	.913	1	0	1	38	2	0	3.33	.857
2015–16	HC Lugano	NLA	44	23	13	4	2,713	125	1	2.76	.922	15	9	6	930	36	0	2.32	.937
2016–17	HC Lugano	NLA	40	19	16	1	2,408	116	3	2.89	.916	11	5	6	654	25	0	2.29	.933
2017–18	HC Lugano	NL	40	19	15	1	2,431	110	4	2.72	.921	18	11	7	1,104	40	0	2.17	.935
2018–19	HC Lugano	NL	43	22	18	0	2,559	104	5	2.44	.921	4	0	4	273	18	0	3.95	.872
2019–20	Columbus Blue Jackets	NHL	33	13	9	8	1,816	71	5	2.35	.923	2	1	1	123	4	0	1.96	.946
2019–20	Cleveland Monsters	AHL	2	1	1	0	119	3	0	1.52	.949	—	—	—	—	—	—	—	—
2020–21	Columbus Blue Jackets	NHL	28	8	12	5	1,497	69	2	2.77	.916	—	—	—	—	—	—	—	—
2021–22	Columbus Blue Jackets	NHL	59	27	23	7	3,321	178	2	3.22	.907	—	—	—	—	—	—	—	—
2022–23	Columbus Blue Jackets	NHL	30	7	18	2	1,561	110	0	4.23	.876	—	—	—	—	—	—	—	—
2023–24	Columbus Blue Jackets	NHL	41	13	17	8	2,259	130	1	3.45	.897	—	—	—	—	—	—	—	—
2024–25	Columbus Blue Jackets	NHL	53	26	21	5	3,171	168	1	3.18	.892	—	—	—	—	—	—	—	—
2025–26	Columbus Blue Jackets	NHL	30	14	11	3	1,679	95	1	3.40	.883	—	—	—	—	—	—	—	—
NL totals			216	117	80	12	12,689	557	15	2.63	.920	50	25	25	3,079	122	0	2.38	.930
NHL totals			274	108	111	38	15,300	652	12	3.22	.900	2	1	1	123	4	0	1.96	.946

=== International ===
Year	Team	Event	Result	GP	W	L	OT	MIN	GA	SO	GAA	SV%
2011	Latvia	WJC18-D1	12th	2	2	0	0	120	1	1	0.50	.978
2012	Latvia	WJC18	9th	4	1	2	0	184	15	0	4.88	.885
2012	Latvia	WJC	9th	1	0	1	0	60	14	0	14.00	.720
2013	Latvia	WJC	10th	3	0	3	0	133	13	0	5.85	.860
2014	Latvia	WJC-D1	13th	3	1	1	0	127	5	1	2.36	.900
2016	Latvia	WC	13th	5	1	2	2	268	13	0	2.91	.912
2016	Latvia	OGQ	DNQ	2	1	1	0	91	2	0	1.32	.931
2017	Latvia	WC	10th	6	3	2	1	364	12	1	1.98	.934
2018	Latvia	WC	8th	7	4	1	1	360	9	2	1.50	.940
2019	Latvia	WC	10th	5	1	4	0	237	11	0	2.78	.914
2022	Latvia	WC	10th	5	2	3	0	226	16	0	4.26	.862
2024	Latvia	WC	9th	4	2	2	0	200	16	0	4.80	.826
2026	Latvia	OG	10th	2	0	1	0	100	9	0	5.40	.850
Junior totals				13	4	7	0	624	48	2	1.30	.870
Senior totals				36	14	17	4	1,846	88	3	2.86	.904

== Awards and honours ==
Award	Year	Ref
NL
Youngster of the Year	2014	
Jacques Plante Trophy	2016, 2018	
International
Latvian Player of the Year	2018	
NHL
All-Rookie Team	2020	
