= Sepp Weingärtner =

Swiss ice hockey player

- Born: April 19, 1932 (age 92)
- Position: Defence
- National team: Switzerland
- Playing career: 1956–1956

Josef "Sepp" Weingärtner (born April 19, 1932) is a Swiss former ice hockey player who competed in the 1956 Winter Olympics.

In 1956, he participated with the Swiss ice hockey team in the Winter Olympics tournament.

== See also ==
- List of Olympic men's ice hockey players for Switzerland
