= Rodolphe Cuendet =

Swiss ice hockey player

- Born: 1891; Sainte-Croix, Switzerland
- Died: 9 February 1954 (aged 62–63); Sainte-Croix, Switzerland
- Position: Left wing
- National team: Switzerland
- Playing career: 1910–1920

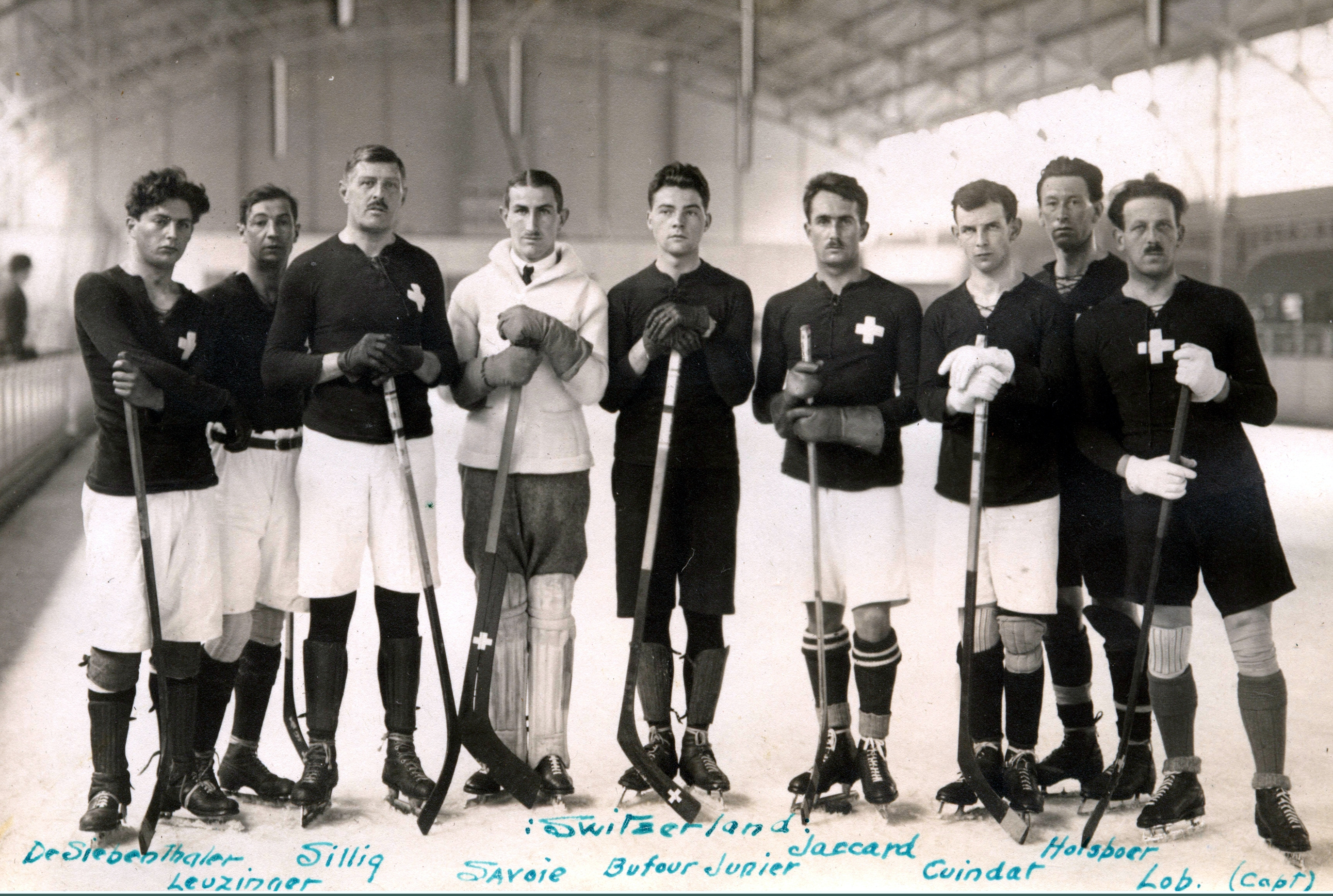
Image of the 1920 Olympics Swiss Ice Hockey Team; Cuendat is third from right.

Rodolphe Cuendet (1891 – 9 February 1954) was a Swiss ice hockey player who competed in the 1920 Summer Olympics.

In 1920, he participated with the Swiss ice hockey team in the Summer Olympics tournament.

== See also ==
- List of Olympic men's ice hockey players for Switzerland
