= Paul Lob =

Swiss ice hockey player

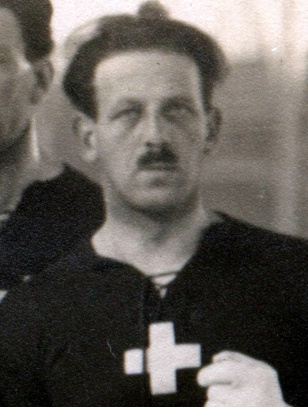
- Born: 13 July 1893; La Tour-de-Peilz, Switzerland
- Died: 22 February 1965 (aged 71); Montreux, Switzerland
- Position: Defence
- National team: Switzerland
- Playing career: 1920–1920

Paul Lob (13 July 1893 – 22 February 1965) was a Swiss ice hockey player who competed in the 1920 Summer Olympics. In 1920 he participated with the Swiss ice hockey team in the Summer Olympics tournament.

== See also ==
- List of Olympic men's ice hockey players for Switzerland
