= Walter von Siebenthal =

Swiss ice hockey player

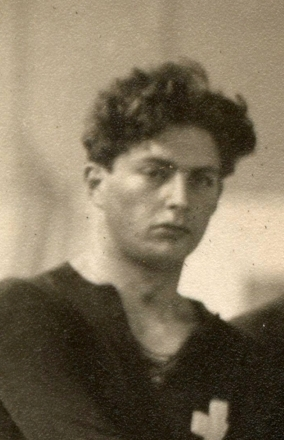
- Born: 6 June 1899; Geneva, Switzerland
- Died: September 1958 (aged 59)
- Position: Left wing
- National team: Switzerland
- Playing career: 1919–1930

Walter von Siebenthal (6 June 1899 – September 1958) was a Swiss ice hockey player who competed in the 1924 Winter Olympics. In 1924, he participated with the Swiss ice hockey team in the Winter Olympics tournament.

== See also ==
- List of Olympic men's ice hockey players for Switzerland
