= Renato Tosio =

Swiss ice hockey player

- Born: 16 November 1964 (age 60); Wil, SUI
- Height: 5 ft 11 in (180 cm)
- Weight: 177 lb (80 kg; 12 st 9 lb)
- Position: Goaltender
- Caught: Left
- Played for: EHC Chur; SC Bern
- National team: Switzerland
- Playing career: 1980–2001

Renato Tosio (born 16 November 1964 in Wil, Switzerland) is a retired Swiss professional ice hockey goaltender. He is popular for his energetic style of play, for his sportsmanship and also for being a great entertainer and showman.

== Playing career ==
Tosio began his professional career playing for EHC Chur, after playing in junior teams of the club since he was 8 years old. He stayed with Chur until the end of the 1986/87 season, twice winning the NLB championship and thus promoting to the NLA (in 1984 and 1986).

He then played 14 years for SC Bern, the first game on 3 October 1987 against EHC Biel and the final one on 20 March 2001 against HC Lugano.

He was Swiss Ice Hockey Champion for four times with SC Bern: 1989, 1991, 1992, 1997

His jersey number 31 has since been retired. Other retired numbers include 7 (Martin Rauch), 12 (Roland Dellsberger) and 16 (Sven Leuenberger). These numbers are inscribed on a huge banner below the roof of the PostFinance Arena, the home venue of the SC Bern.

== Records ==
- From 23 February 1985 to 20 March 2001 Tosio played 713 NL games in a row, without missing one due to illness or injury.

== Career statistics ==
Season	Team	League	GP	W	L	T	MIN	GA	SO
1979-80	EHC Chur	NLB	3	0	3	0	123	14	0
1981-82	EHC Chur	NLB	21	12	6	3	1260	89	0
1982-83	EHC Chur	NLB	37	26	9	2	2340	115	2
1983-84	EHC Chur	NLB	42	28	11	3	2519	136	2
1984-85	EHC Chur	NLA	35	3	30	2	1919	193	0
1985-86	EHC Chur	NLB	41	21	13	7	2479	137	1
1986-87	EHC Chur	NLA	36	10	24	2	2155	164	1
1987-88	SC Bern	NLA	36	12	20	4	2158	147	1
1988-89	SC Bern	NLA	47	32	11	4	2808	136	3
1989-90	SC Bern	NLA	47	28	13	6	2826	142	3
1990-91	SC Bern	NLA	46	37	3	6	2735	100	4
1991-92	SC Bern	NLA	47	30	11	6	2789	118	6
1992-93	SC Bern	NLA	41	22	15	4	2465	133	0
1993-94	SC Bern	NLA	41	20	17	4	2498	115	2
1994-95	SC Bern	NLA	42	21	18	3	2559	138	1
1995-96	SC Bern	NLA	47	27	16	4	2840	126	2
1996-97	SC Bern	NLA	59	38	19	2	3564	170	5
1997-98	SC Bern	NLA	47	22	18	7	2864	152	2
1998-99	SC Bern	NLA	51	24	22	5	3215	176	2
1999-00	SC Bern	NLA	50	20	23	7	2850	149	1
2000-01	SC Bern	NLA	54	26	19	9	3355	128	3
NLB Totals			144	87	321	42	8721	491	6
NLA Totals			726	372	279	75	43600	2287	36
NL Totals			870	459	321	90	52321	2778	42

== International play ==
Renato Tosio played a total of 183 games for the Swiss national team, 145 on the ice and 38 as substitute goaltender.

He participated in the following tournaments:

- 5 A World Championships: 1987, 1991, 1992, 1993, 1995
- 5 B World Championships: 1986, 1989, 1990, 1994, 1997
- 2 Olympic Games: 1988 in Calgary and 1992 in Lillehammer

GP	W	L	T	GA	SO
145	57	71	17	515	6

Tosio wore jersey number 28 in the national team.

== Awards ==
Winner of the Jacques Plante Trophy: 1989, 1990, 1991, 1997

Swiss Hockey Award: 2003
