= Hirtz compass =

Medical device

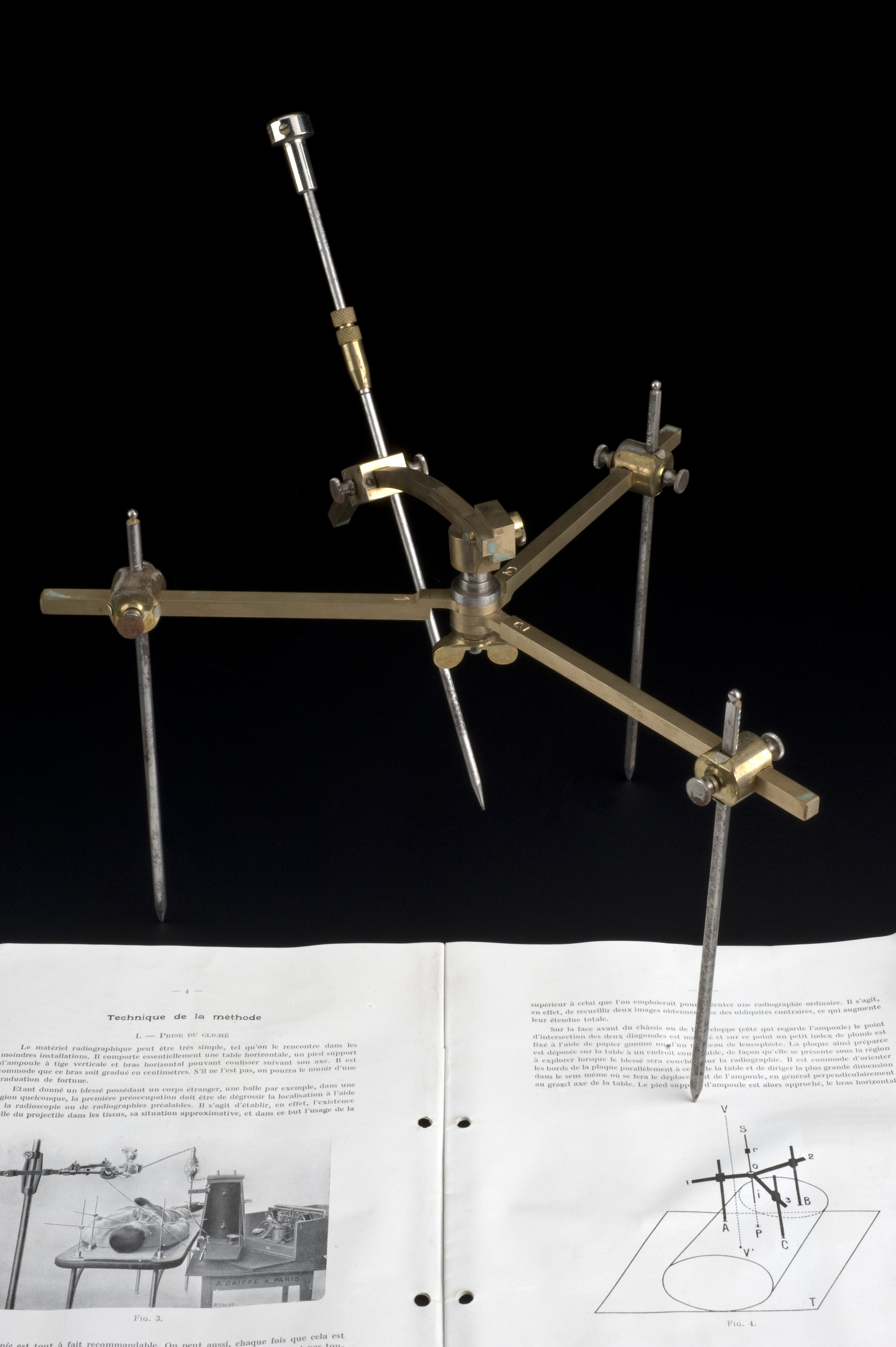
a Hirtz compass

The Hirtz compass is a medical device previously used to determine the location and aid the removal of bullets and shrapnel in a patient's body. The device would be used by a surgeon who would, with the help of x-ray photographs, precisely remove the foreign object. The device would usually give a location within 1 or 2 millimeters of the foreign object. At its peak, the average rate of projectile removal when the device was used by local surgeons reached approximately 90%. The device was extensively used during World War I.

== History ==
The Hirtz compass was invented in 1907 by E. J. Hirtz, a French radiologist working at a military hospital.

== Procedure ==
First, the compass is carefully secured and the penetration needle is brought in contact with the skin. The compass will then give the location of the incision and the depth and direction of the projectile. The compass is then removed and an incision is made in the indicated direction. The surgeons left index finger is put into the wound and the compass is secured in place above the surgeon's left hand. The indicator needle is then pressed into the route prepared by the left index. At the point where the indicator needle ends, the surgeon should be able to feel the bullet which can then be removed.

=== Difficulties and problems with the procedure ===
The procedure requires a large area of skin to be left uncovered, which is sometimes an inconvenience for the surgeon. The main problem with the device is the fact that the patient's soft body parts can change shape and thus give inaccurate results. When the projectile is to be extracted from muscular tissue, the procedure must be done with completely relaxed muscles, therefore needing complete anesthesia. Otherwise, the contractions would displace the foreign object making removal with the aid of the compass difficult.
