= Georg Daniel Hirtz =

French master turner and writer (1804–1893)

- Georges Daniel Hirtz
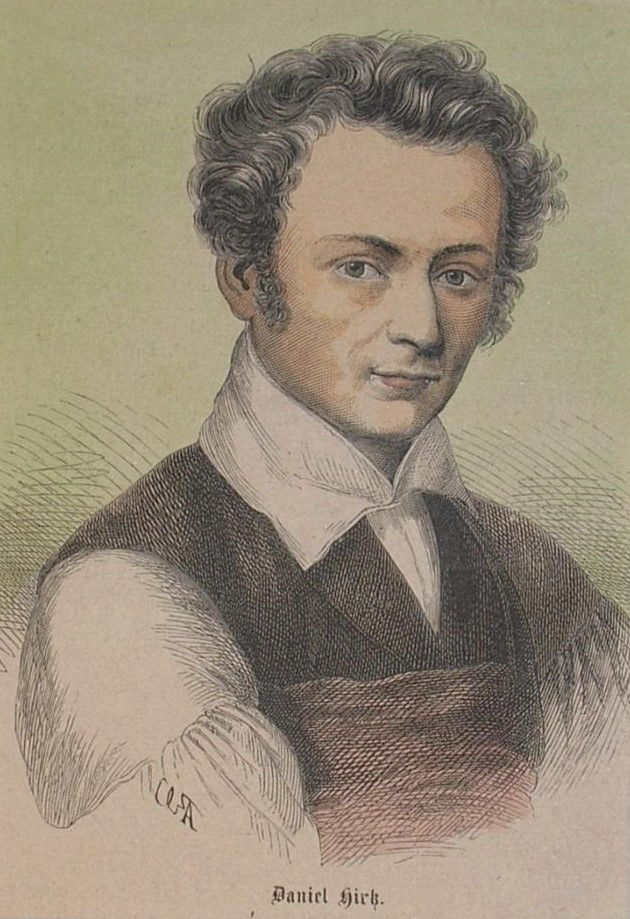
- Born: February 2, 1804; Strasbourg, France
- Died: April 20, 1893 (aged 89); Strasbourg, German Empire
- Occupations: Master turner Author

Georg Daniel Hirtz (in French: Georges Daniel Hirtz) was a master turner and writer from Alsace. He is known for editing the celebrated journal Der hinkende Bote am Rhein (The Limping Messenger on the Rhine) between 1849 and 1891.

== Biography ==
Hirtz did not begin studies until the age of 12, when he attended the Protestant Jean Sturm Gymnasium before beginning an apprenticeship with his father, a master turner. In 1823 he began his journeyman years around Europe to perfect his craft. He first visited Switzerland before travelling all over Germany. In Merseburg he wrote the poem Der Fürstenring (The Prince's Ring), which gained considerable success in Alsace. In Berlin, he worked with the master-turner Engel and assisted on the wedding furniture of the Prince Royal Frederick William, the future King of Prussia. In Hildesheim he wrote the popular tale Der Dom zu Hildesheim (Hildesheim Cathedral).

In 1827 he returned to Strasbourg where he set up his own workshop two years later, becoming well-respected as both a craftsman and a poet. For the 400th anniversary of the completion of Strasbourg Cathedral on 24 June 1839, he read his poem Das Münsterfest (The Minster Celebration) to the crowd assembled on the platform. The Magistrate of Strasbourg entrusted Hirtz with arranging the Turners Guild party for the parade of guilds in honour of Johannes Gutenberg in 1840, as well as with writing new poetry for the occasion. His piece Die Bischofswahl (The Election of the Bishop), printed by the Frankfurt journal Didaskalia, brought him wide renown.

From 1849 he was employed by the Church of the Confession in Augsburg and became editor of Das hinkende Bote am Rhein. In his old age he retired to the Deaconry in Strasbourg where he died some years later. There is a street in the Orangerie district of Strasbourg that bears his name, located at 48°35′23.51″N 7°46′11.83″E.

== Children ==
Georg Daniel Hirtz had one son and one daughter. His son, also called Georg Daniel, enlisted in the army so as not to become a pastor. He led an adventurous life, and after the German annexation of 1871, returned to Alsace to become a tax collector in Bischwiller. The younger Hirtz died in 1887, leaving behind several works in both German and Alsatian. His sister and Georg Daniel Sr.'s daughter, Sophie Catherine Hirtz, married Jean-Georges Groetzinger, a Lutheran Pasteur from Strasbourg, Bas-Rhin, Alsace, France. Sophie Catherine Hirtz Groetzinger died on 13 March 1901 in Colmar, Haut-Rhin, Alsace-Lorraine, France.

== Works ==
- Gedichte von Georg Daniel Hirtz (Poems of Georg Daniel Hirtz), book, 1838. With a foreword by Eduard Reuß.
- Der hinkende Bote am Rhein (The Limping Messenger on the Rhine), journal, 1849–1891.
