= Arnold Hirtz =

Swiss ice hockey player

- Born: 2 September 1910
- Died: 1 March 1993 (aged 82)
- Position: Goaltender
- National team: Switzerland
- Playing career: 1931–1939

Arnold Hirtz (2 September 1910 – 1 March 1993) was a Swiss ice hockey player who competed in the 1936 Winter Olympics.

In 1936, he participated with the Swiss ice hockey team in the Winter Olympics tournament.

== See also ==
List of Olympic men's ice hockey players for Switzerland
