= Edouard Filliol =

Swiss ice hockey player

- Born: 16 December 1895
- Died: 19 March 1955 (aged 59)
- Position: Goaltender
- National team: Switzerland
- Playing career: 1924–1924

Edouard Frank Filliol (16 December 1895 – 19 March 1955) was a Swiss ice hockey player who competed in the 1924 Winter Olympics. He played for Genève-Servette HC from 1921-26.

In 1924 he participated with the Swiss ice hockey team in the Winter Olympics tournament.

== See also ==
- List of Olympic men's ice hockey players for Switzerland
