= Ernest Jacquet =

Swiss ice hockey player

- Born: September 25, 1886
- Died: September 30, 1969 (aged 83)
- Position: Right wing
- National team: Switzerland
- Playing career: 1924–1924

Ernest Jacquet (September 25, 1886 – September 30, 1969) was a Swiss ice hockey player who competed in the 1924 Winter Olympics.

In 1924 he participated with the Swiss ice hockey team in the Winter Olympics tournament.

== See also ==
- List of Olympic men's ice hockey players for Switzerland
