= Fred Auckenthaler =

Swiss ice hockey player

- Born: 29 September 1899 Lausanne, Switzerland
- Died: 18 February 1946 (aged 46) Mulhouse, France
- Position: Right wing
- National team: Switzerland
- Playing career: 1921–1926

Frédéric Louis Henri Oscar Auckenthaler (29 September 1899 – 18 February 1946) was a Swiss ice hockey player who competed in the 1924 Winter Olympics. In 1924 he participated with the Swiss ice hockey team in the Winter Olympics tournament.

== See also ==
List of Olympic men's ice hockey players for Switzerland
