= Ernest Mottier =

Swiss ice hockey player

- Born: 16 April 1891 Château-d'Œx, Switzerland
- Died: 13 August 1968 (aged 77)
- Position: Defence
- Shot: Left
- National team: Switzerland
- Playing career: 1918–1933

Edouard "Ernest" Mottier (16 April 1891 – 13 August 1968) was a Swiss ice hockey player who competed in the 1924 Winter Olympics.

In 1924, he participated with the Swiss ice hockey team in the Winter Olympics tournament.

== See also ==
- List of Olympic men's ice hockey players for Switzerland
