= André Verdeil =

Swiss ice hockey player

- Born: January 21, 1904; Manchester, England, U.K.
- Died: October 31, 1990 (aged 86); Finistère, France
- National team: Switzerland
- Playing career: 1924–1924

André Cecil Verdeil (b. January 21, 1904 - d. October 31, 1990) was a Swiss ice hockey player who competed in the 1924 Winter Olympics.

In 1924, he participated with the Swiss ice hockey team in the Winter Olympics tournament.

== See also ==
List of Olympic men's ice hockey players for Switzerland
