= Donald Unger =

Swiss ice hockey player

- Born: May 3, 1894 Montreux, Switzerland
- Died: June 30, 1943 (aged 49) Concord, New Hampshire, United States
- Position: Left wing
- National team: Switzerland
- Playing career: 1909–1924

Donald Sebastian Unger (May 3, 1894 – June 30, 1943) was a Swiss ice hockey player who competed in the 1924 Winter Olympics.

In 1924 he participated with the Swiss ice hockey team in the Winter Olympics tournament.

== See also ==
- List of Olympic men's ice hockey players for Switzerland
