= Jaroslav Řezáč =

Czech ice hockey player (1886–1974)

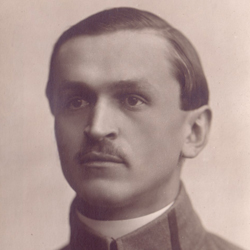
- Born: 6 February 1886 Jičín, Bohemia, Austria-Hungary
- Died: 29 May 1974 (aged 88) Prague, Czechoslovakia
- Position: Goaltender
- National team: Czechoslovakia
- Playing career: 1909–1931

Jaroslav Řezáč (6 February 1886 – 29 May 1974) was a Czech ice hockey player who was named to the Czechoslovakia national team for both the 1924 Winter Olympics and in the 1928 Winter Olympics, though he did not play any games.
