= Bruno Leuzinger =

Swiss ice hockey player

- Born: 6 January 1886; Château-d'Œx, Switzerland
- Died: 23 December 1952 (aged 66); Geneva, Switzerland
- Position: Centre
- National team: Switzerland
- Playing career: 1919–1924

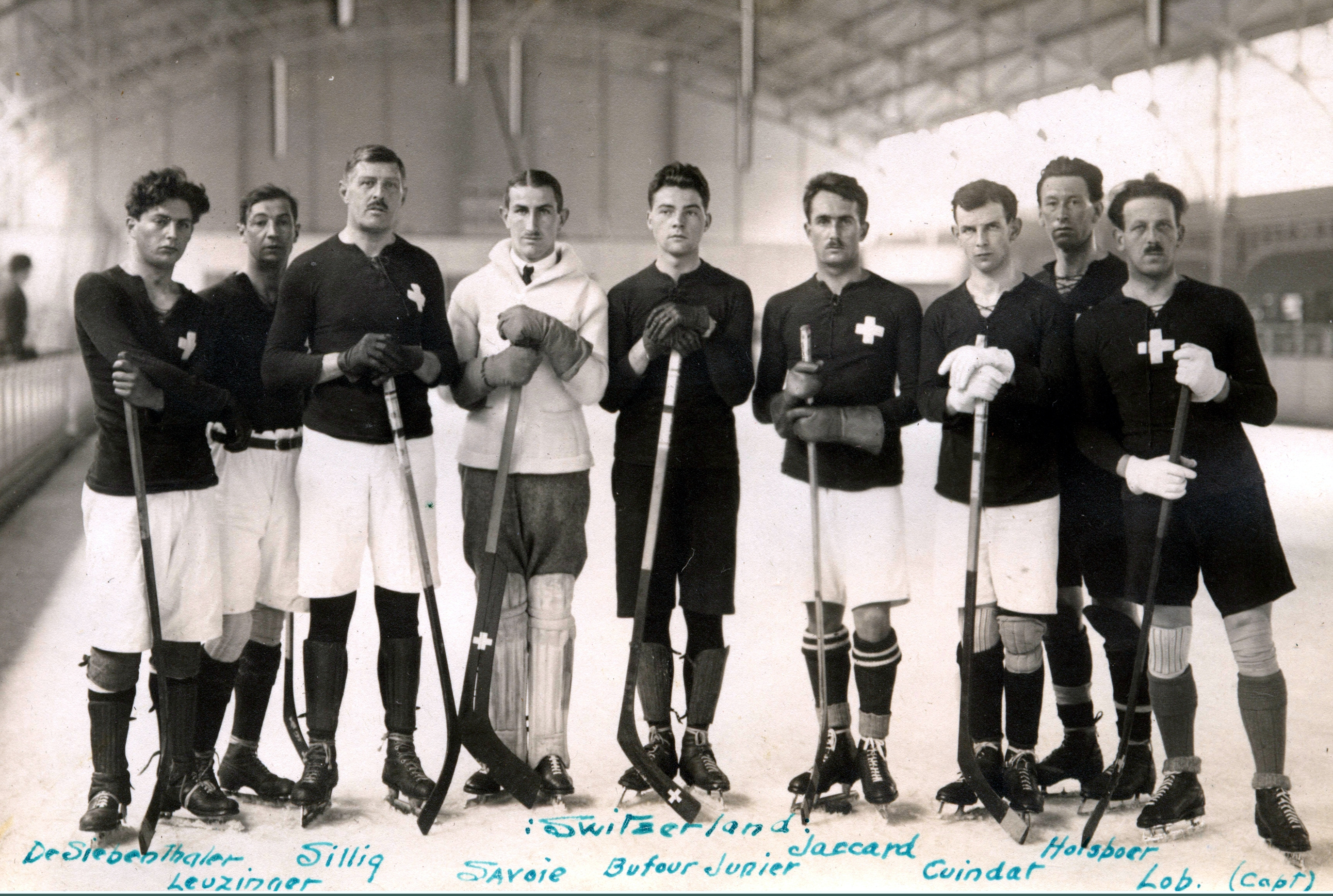
The 1920 Olympics Swiss ice hockey team

Bruno Leuzinger (6 January 1886 – 23 December 1952) was a Swiss ice hockey player who competed in the 1920 Summer Olympics and in the 1924 Winter Olympics.

He was born in Château-d'Œx, Vaud. In 1920, he participated with the Swiss ice hockey team in the Summer Olympic tournament. Four years later, he was also a member of the Swiss team in the first Winter Olympics tournament.
