= Adolf Martignoni =

Swiss ice hockey player

- Born: 28 July 1909 St. Moritz, Switzerland
- Died: 7 February 1989 (aged 79)
- Position: Defence
- National team: Switzerland
- Playing career: 1931–1938

Adolphe Hermann Martignoni (28 July 1909 – 7 February 1989) was a Swiss ice hockey player who competed for the Swiss national team at the 1936 Winter Olympics in Garmisch-Partenkirchen.
