= Arnold Martignoni =

Swiss ice hockey player

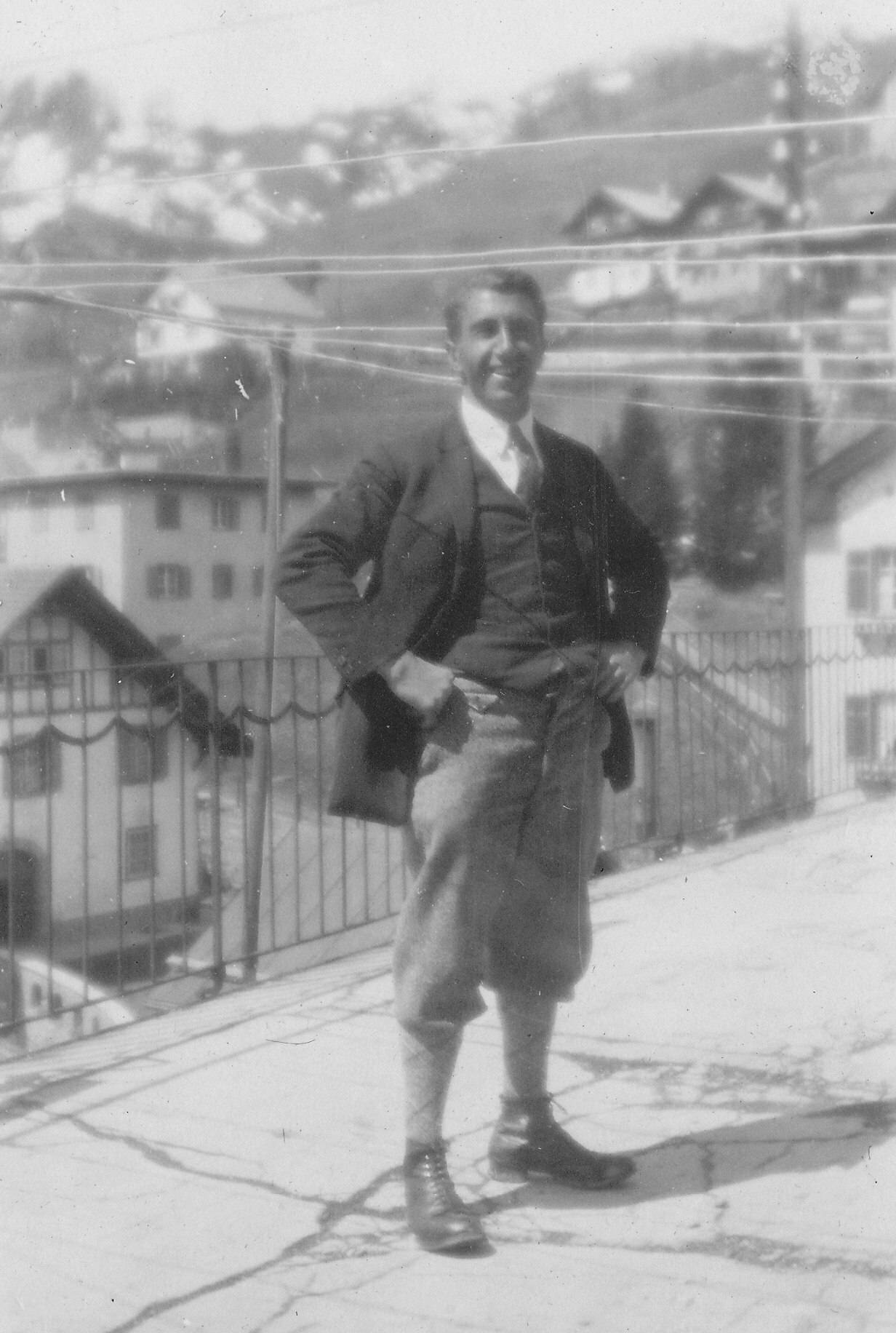

Medal record

Men's Ice hockey

Olympic Games
Bronze medal – third place	1928 St. Moritz	Team competition

Arnoldo Giovanni Martignoni (19 May 1901 – 9 March 1984) was a Swiss ice hockey player who competed in the 1928 Winter Olympics.

He was a member of the Swiss ice hockey team, which won the bronze medal.
