= Marius Jaccard =

Swiss ice hockey player

- Born: 27 March 1898; Geneva, Switzerland
- Died: 19 January 1978 (aged 79); Pully, Switzerland
- Position: Defence
- National team: Switzerland
- Playing career: 1919–1928

Marius Jaccard (27 March 1898 – 19 January 1978) was a Swiss ice hockey player who competed in the 1920 Summer Olympics and in the 1924 Winter Olympics. In 1920 he participated with the Swiss ice hockey team in the Summer Olympics tournament. Four years later he was also a member of the Swiss team in the first Winter Olympics tournament.
