= Paul Müller (ice hockey) =

Swiss ice hockey player (1896–1974)

- Born: 22 February 1896 Davos, Switzerland
- Died: 1974 (aged 77–78)
- Position: Defence/centre
- National team: Switzerland
- Playing career: 1923–1928

Paul "Putzi" Müller (22 February 1896 – 1974) was a Swiss ice hockey player who competed in the 1924 Winter Olympics. His son, Paul Müller junior, was an ice hockey player of the 1930s.

In 1924, he participated with the Swiss ice hockey team in the first Winter Olympics tournament.

Müller died in 1974.
