= Carl Josefsson (ice hockey) =

Swedish ice hockey player

Carl Vilhelm "Kalle-Knubb" Josefsson (September 1, 1895 – November 3, 1974) was a Swedish ice hockey player who competed in the 1924 Winter Olympics.

In 1924, he was a member of the Swedish ice hockey team which finished fourth in the Olympic ice hockey tournament. He played two matches as goaltender.
