= Lars Weibel =

Swiss ice hockey player

- Born: May 20, 1974 (age 51) Lachen, Switzerland
- Height: 6 ft 1 in (185 cm)
- Weight: 190 lb (86 kg; 13 st 8 lb)
- Position: Goaltender
- Caught: Left
- Played for: EV Zug; HC Lugano; HC Davos
- National team: Switzerland
- NHL draft: 248th overall, 1994; Chicago Blackhawks
- Playing career: 1989–2010

Lars Weibel (born May 20, 1974) is a retired Swiss ice hockey goaltender who played for several teams in the Swiss National League A. He also represented the Switzerland men's national ice hockey team on several occasions in the World Junior Championships, World Championships and Olympics.
