= Biathlon at the 1972 Winter Olympics – Individual =

Men's biathlon individual at the XI Olympic Winter Games
- Venue: Makomanai Biathlon Site
- Dates: February 9, 1972
- Competitors: 54 from 14 nations
- Winning time: 1:14:12.3

Medalists
1st place, gold medalist(s)		Magnar Solberg	Norway
2nd place, silver medalist(s)		Hansjörg Knauthe	East Germany
3rd place, bronze medalist(s)		Lars-Göran Arwidson	Sweden

The Men's 20 kilometre individual biathlon competition at the 1972 Winter Olympics was held on 9 February, at Makomanai Biathlon Site. Each miss of the target cost two minutes, while hitting the outer circle cost one minute.

== Summary ==
Alexander Tikhonov and Dieter Speer, who between them had the last three world titles, were two of the fastest skiers, but neither managed to medal; Speer took seven minutes of penalties to put himself out of contention, and Tikhonov was unable to recover from three penalties on the first shoot, as he managed to get back to 4th place, but finished more than twenty seconds clear of the medalists. The winner was the defending Olympic champion Magnar Solberg. Solberg led early, and limited his penalties to only two, one of the better rounds of the day. Silver went to Hansjörg Knauthe, who was one of only two men to receive only one shooting penalty. Lars-Göran Arwidson took bronze, holding off Tikhonov by 30 seconds. Finland's Esko Saira skied even quicker than Tikhonov, but had five minutes in penalties, and ended up 6th.

Solberg remains the only champion to defend his title.

== Results ==
Penalties refer to minutes added, as described above, not (necessarily) number of targets missed.

Rank	Bib	Name	Country	Ski Time	Penalties (P+S+P+S)	Result	Deficit
1st place, gold medalist(s)	28	Magnar Solberg	Norway	1:13:55.50	2 (0+1+1+0)	1:15:55.50	–
2nd place, silver medalist(s)	30	Hansjörg Knauthe	East Germany	1:15:07.60	1 (1+0+0+0)	1:16:07.60	+12.10
3rd place, bronze medalist(s)	38	Lars-Göran Arwidson	Sweden	1:14:27.03	2 (0+0+2+0)	1:16:27.03	+31.53
4	29	Aleksandr Tikhonov	Soviet Union	1:12:48.65	4 (3+1+0+0)	1:16:48.65	+53.15
5	9	Yrjö Salpakari	Finland	1:14:51.43	2 (0+1+1+0)	1:16:51.43	+55.93
6	40	Esko Saira	Finland	1:12:34.80	5 (2+1+1+1)	1:17:34.80	+1:39.30
7	15	Viktor Mamatov	Soviet Union	1:16:16.26	2 (1+1+0+0)	1:18:16.26	+2:20.76
8	48	Tor Svendsberget	Norway	1:15:26.54	3 (0+1+1+1)	1:18:26.54	+2:31.04
9	36	Aleksander Klima	Poland	1:17:00.86	2 (1+0+0+1)	1:19:00.86	+3:05.36
10	24	Daniel Claudon	France	1:18:14.67	1 (0+1+0+0)	1:19:14.67	+3:19.17
11	41	Keith Oliver	Great Britain	1:17:40.31	3 (0+0+1+2)	1:20:40.31	+4:44.81
12	47	Ivan Biakov	Soviet Union	1:17:42.78	3 (0+2+1+0)	1:20:42.78	+4:47.28
13	26	Dieter Speer	East Germany	1:13:43.63	7 (1+1+1+4)	1:20:43.63	+4:48.13
14	11	Peter Karns	United States	1:18:59.67	2 (0+0+0+2)	1:20:59.67	+5:04.17
15	2	Günter Bartnik	East Germany	1:16:01.73	5 (1+1+1+2)	1:21:01.73	+5:06.23
16	19	Willy Bertin	Italy	1:16:03.04	5 (1+0+0+4)	1:21:03.04	+5:07.54
17	22	Miki Shibuya	Japan	1:16:57.27	5 (1+1+0+3)	1:21:57.27	+6:01.77
18	3	Kåre Hovda	Norway	1:16:20.37	6 (1+2+1+2)	1:22:20.37	+6:24.87
19	8	Rinnat Safin	Soviet Union	1:15:22.59	7 (3+2+1+1)	1:22:22.59	+6:27.09
20	52	Horst Koschka	East Germany	1:17:24.58	5 (0+3+0+2)	1:22:24.58	+6:29.08
21	46	Holmfrid Olsson	Sweden	1:19:28.78	3 (0+0+1+2)	1:22:28.78	+6:33.28
22	37	Giovanni Astegiano	Italy	1:16:45.90	6 (3+1+1+1)	1:22:45.90	+6:50.40
23	1	Shozo Sasaki	Japan	1:18:05.54	5 (1+3+1+0)	1:23:05.54	+7:10.04
24	20	Dennis Donahue	United States	1:19:20.39	4 (1+0+3+0)	1:23:20.39	+7:24.89
25	31	Isao Ono	Japan	1:16:26.83	7 (5+0+0+2)	1:23:26.83	+7:31.33
26	7	Jeffrey Stevens	Great Britain	1:19:28.95	4 (0+2+1+1)	1:23:28.95	+7:33.45
27	21	Mauri Röppänen	Finland	1:16:45.88	7 (1+2+2+2)	1:23:45.88	+7:50.38
28	35	Victor Fontana	Romania	1:19:17.85	5 (0+2+3+0)	1:24:17.85	+8:22.35
29	33	Ragnar Tveiten	Norway	1:17:19.91	7 (2+3+0+2)	1:24:19.91	+8:24.41
30	49	Juhani Suutarinen	Finland	1:14:26.99	10 (2+2+0+6)	1:24:26.99	+8:30.49
31	5	Pierantonio Clementi	Italy	1:19:28.74	6 (3+1+0+2)	1:25:28.74	+9:33.24
32	27	Vilmoş Gheorghe	Romania	1:17:52.27	8 (2+5+0+1)	1:25:52.27	+9:56.77
33	10	Andrzej Rapacz	Poland	1:17:21.02	9 (2+4+0+3)	1:26:21.02	+10:25.52
34	42	Nicolae Veştea	Romania	1:21:08.21	6 (0+1+1+4)	1:27:08.21	+11:12.71
35	25	Józef Stopka	Poland	1:19:18.66	8 (2+2+1+3)	1:27:18.66	+11:23.16
36	13	Ladislav Žižka	Czechoslovakia	1:16:36.81	11 (6+1+1+3)	1:27:36.81	+11:41.31
37	39	René Arpin	France	1:19:52.64	8 (1+3+1+3)	1:27:52.64	+11:57.14
38	43	Kazuo Sasakubo	Japan	1:19:07.43	9 (3+4+1+1)	1:28:07.43	+12:11.93
39	16	Arnošt Hájek	Czechoslovakia	1:19:22.37	9 (3+3+2+1)	1:28:22.37	+12:26.87
40	45	Lino Jordan	Italy	1:16:26.09	12 (2+3+2+5)	1:28:26.09	+12:30.59
41	32	Terry Morse	United States	1:21:40.14	7 (1+1+4+1)	1:28:40.14	+12:44.64
42	14	Olle Petrusson	Sweden	1:16:40.58	12 (2+0+5+5)	1:28:40.58	+12:45.08
43	18	Alan Notley	Great Britain	1:21:48.72	7 (1+2+4+0)	1:28:48.72	+12:53.22
44	50	Stanislav Fajstavr	Czechoslovakia	1:19:53.33	9 (3+1+3+2)	1:28:53.33	+12:57.83
45	54	Jay Bowerman	United States	1:22:13.71	7 (1+3+1+2)	1:29:13.71	+13:18.21
46	23	Josef Niedermeier	West Germany	1:21:26.44	8 (2+0+3+3)	1:29:26.44	+13:30.94
47	34	Pavel Ploc	Czechoslovakia	1:18:38.79	11 (1+6+0+4)	1:29:38.79	+13:43.29
48	44	Andrzej Fiedor	Poland	1:19:17.25	11 (3+4+3+1)	1:30:17.25	+14:21.75
49	17	Torsten Wadman	Sweden	1:17:17.56	13 (2+2+5+4)	1:30:17.56	+14:22.06
50	4	Theo Merkel	West Germany	1:19:58.17	11 (2+3+2+4)	1:30:58.17	+15:02.67
51	53	Aimé Gruet-Masson	France	1:18:44.41	15 (2+6+4+3)	1:33:44.41	+17:48.91
52	6	Constantin Carabela	Romania	1:22:45.95	11 (3+5+0+3)	1:33:45.95	+17:50.45
53	51	Malcolm Hirst	Great Britain	1:20:55.59	14 (0+6+4+4)	1:34:55.59	+19:00.09
-	12	Paul Chassagne	France	DNF	-	-	-
