= Biathlon at the 1972 Winter Olympics – Relay =

Men's biathlon relay at the XI Olympic Winter Games
- Venue: Makomanai Biathlon Site
- Dates: 11 February 1972
- Competitors: 52 from 13 nations
- Winning time: 1:51:44.92

Medalists
1st place, gold medalist(s)		Soviet Union; Aleksandr Tikhonov; Rinnat Safin; Ivan Biakov; Viktor Mamatov
2nd place, silver medalist(s)		Finland; Esko Saira; Juhani Suutarinen; Heikki Ikola; Mauri Röppänen
3rd place, bronze medalist(s)		East Germany; Hansjörg Knauthe; Joachim Meischner; Dieter Speer; Horst Koschka

The Men's 4 × 7.5 kilometre biathlon relay competition at the 1972 Winter Olympics took place on 11 February, at Makomanai Biathlon Site. Each national team consisted of four members, with each skiing 7.5 kilometres and shooting twice, once prone and once standing.

At each shooting station, a competitor has eight shots to hit five targets; however, only five bullets are loaded in a magazine at one - if additional shots are required, the spare bullets must be loaded one at a time. If after the eight shots are taken, there are still targets not yet hit, the competitor must ski a 150-metre penalty loop.

== Results ==
The last three Biathlon World Championships saw the Soviet Union take the relay title ahead of the Norwegians; at the first exchange in Sapporo, however, both were in surprising positions. Alexander Tikhonov had to take two penalty loops, and ended up more than a minute behind the surprise leaders from Japan, as Isao Ono stormed to a big lead. The British were also well placed, in third, with the East Germans splitting the two surprise contenders. In the second leg, the surprise teams fell off, the Japanese taking five penalty loops and the British four. It was the Soviets who asserted their authority, Rinnat Safin putting together the only sub 27-minute leg of the race to stake them to a one-minute lead. The Americans were now surprisingly in bronze medal position, while Norway's Kåre Hovda took three penalties to leave them more than two minutes behind.

Ivan Biakov needed a penalty loop on the third leg, but still managed to extend the lead over Dieter Speer of East Germany, with Sweden coming up into third place through some good shooting by Torsten Wadman. Viktor Mamatov had a quick final leg to ease the Soviets home to victory, while the other medal placing changed after some shooting struggles. Holmfrid Olsson of Sweden and Horst Koschka of East Germany each missed twice, dropping the Swedes out of the medals and the East Germans to bronze, behind a Finnish team that had a great final leg from Mauri Röppänen. As for Norway, all four of their shooters needed at least one penalty leg, but they still managed to finish fourth, though there was a substantial gap between them and the top three.

Rank	Bib	Team	Penalties (P+S)	Result	Deficit
1st place, gold medalist(s)	1	Soviet Union; Aleksandr Tikhonov; Rinnat Safin; Ivan Biakov; Viktor Mamatov	1+6 2+3; 0+1 2+3; 0+1 0+0; 1+3 0+0; 0+1 0+0	1:51:44.92; 28:54.48; 26:48.52; 28:15.90; 27:46.02	–
2nd place, silver medalist(s)	9	Finland; Esko Saira; Juhani Suutarinen; Heikki Ikola; Mauri Röppänen	1+5 2+9; 0+0 1+3; 1+3 1+3; 0+1 0+3; 0+1 0+0	1:54:37.25; 28:52.04; 29:37.33; 28:45.79; 27:22.09	+2:52.33
3rd place, bronze medalist(s)	12	East Germany; Hansjörg Knauthe; Joachim Meischner; Dieter Speer; Horst Koschka	0+4 4+8; 0+1 0+0; 0+1 0+2; 0+2 2+3; 0+0 2+3	1:54:57.67; 28:11.72; 28:35.86; 28:50.72; 29:19.37	+3:12.75
4	13	Norway; Tor Svendsberget; Kåre Hovda; Ivar Nordkild; Magnar Solberg	0+9 7+12; 0+3 1+3; 0+1 3+3; 0+2 2+3; 0+3 1+3	1:56:24.41; 28:23.86; 29:43.80; 29:41.97; 28:34.78	+4:39.49
5	4	Sweden; Lars-Göran Arwidson; Olle Petrusson; Torsten Wadman; Holmfrid Olsson	4+10 2+8; 1+3 0+3; 3+3 0+1; 0+1 0+1; 0+3 2+3	1:56:57.40; 28:23.09; 29:32.78; 27:52.03; 31:09.50	+5:12.48
6	10	United States; Peter Karns; Terry Morse; Dennis Donahue; Jay Bowerman	0+7 1+7; 0+1 0+2; 0+3 0+1; 0+2 0+1; 0+1 1+3	1:57:24.32; 28:50.37; 28:43.56; 29:01.97; 30:48.42	+5:39.40
7	5	Poland; Józef Różak; Józef Stopka; Andrzej Rapacz; Aleksander Klima	1+7 3+11; 0+1 2+3; 0+0 1+3; 0+3 0+3; 1+3 0+2	1:58:09.92; 29:36.15; 29:21.63; 29:05.75; 30:06.39	+6:24.10
8	11	Japan; Isao Ono; Shozo Sasaki; Miki Shibuya; Kazuo Sasakubo	2+9 3+9; 0+3 0+2; 2+3 3+3; 0+1 0+1; 0+2 0+3	1:59:09.48; 27:35.73; 33:46.08; 27:59.80; 29:47.87	+7:24.56
9	2	Romania; Nicolae Veştea; Victor Fontana; Ion Ţeposu; Vilmoş Gheorghe	1+6 4+11; 0+0 0+3; 1+3 3+3; 0+3 0+2; 0+0 1+3	1:59:30.61; 28:47.96; 32:19.63; 28:47.13; 29:35.89	+7:45.69
10	6	Italy; Willy Bertin; Giovanni Astegiano; Corrado Varesco; Lino Jordan	2+11 4+9; 2+3 0+1; 0+3 0+2; 0+3 1+3; 0+2 3+3	1:59:47.62; 29:06.56; 28:43.42; 30:58.59; 30:59.05	+8:02.70
11	7	Great Britain; Malcolm Hirst; Keith Oliver; Jeffrey Stevens; Alan Notley	2+7 3+9; 0+2 0+0; 2+3 1+3; 0+1 2+3; 0+1 0+3	2:01:38.84; 28:19.40; 31:58.85; 30:53.97; 30:26.62	+9:53.92
12	3	Czechoslovakia; Ladislav Žižka; Pavel Ploc; Ján Húska; Arnošt Hájek	3+12 0+8; 0+3 0+2; 1+3 0+2; 0+3 0+1; 2+3 0+3	2:03:08.17; 28:59.51; 30:38.69; 31:29.79; 32:00.18	+11:23.25
13	8	France; René Arpin; Noël Turrell; Daniel Claudon; Aimé Gruet-Masson	3+10 1+9; 0+2 1+3; 0+2 0+1; 2+3 0+2; 1+3 0+3	2:03:08.90; 30:04.71; 29:34.23; 32:05.94; 31:24.02	+11:23.98
