= United States at the 1972 Winter Olympics =

- Flag of the United States
- IOC code: USA
- NOC: United States Olympic Committee

in Sapporo
- Competitors: 103 (77 men, 26 women) in 6 sports
- Flag bearer: Dianne Holum (speed skating)
- Medals Ranked 5th: Gold 3 Silver 2 Bronze 3 Total 8

Winter Olympics appearances (overview)
- 1924; 1928; 1932; 1936; 1948; 1952; 1956; 1960; 1964; 1968; 1972; 1976; 1980; 1984; 1988; 1992; 1994; 1998; 2002; 2006; 2010; 2014; 2018; 2022; 2026

The United States competed at the 1972 Winter Olympics in Sapporo, Japan.

== Medalists ==
The following U.S. competitors won medals at the games. In the by discipline sections below, medalists' names are bolded.

Medal	Name	Sport	Event	Date
Gold	Dianne Holum	Speed skating	Women's 1500 meters	February 9
Gold	Anne Henning	Speed skating	Women's 500 meters	February 10
Gold	Barbara Cochran	Alpine skiing	Women's slalom	February 11
Silver	Dianne Holum	Speed skating	Women's 3000 meters	February 12
Silver	United States men's national ice hockey team: Kevin Ahearn; Henry Boucha; Charles Brown; Keith Christiansen; Mike Curran; Robbie Ftorek; Mark Howe; Stuart Irving; Jim McElmury; Dick McGlynn; Tom Mellor; Ronald Naslund; Wally Olds; Frank Sanders; Craig Sarner; Peter Sears; Timothy Sheehy	Ice hockey	Men's tournament	February 13
Bronze	Susan Corrock	Alpine skiing	Women's downhill	February 5
Bronze	Janet Lynn	Figure skating	Ladies' singles	February 7
Bronze	Anne Henning	Speed skating	Women's 1000 meters	February 11

Multiple medalists
Name	Sport	1st place, gold medalist(s)	2nd place, silver medalist(s)	3rd place, bronze medalist(s)	Total
Dianne Holum	Speed skating	1	1	0	**2**
Anne Henning	Speed skating	1	0	1	**2**

== Alpine skiing ==
Men

Athlete	Event	Classification		Final					
Athlete	Event	Classification		Run 1		Run 2		Total	
Athlete	Event	Time	Rank	Time	Rank	Time	Rank	Time	Rank
Bob Cochran	Downhill	—N/a						1:53.39	8
David Currier	Downhill	—N/a						1:54.96	17
Hank Kashiwa	Downhill	—N/a						1:55.60	25
Mike Lafferty	Downhill	—N/a						1:54.38	14
Rick Chaffee	Giant slalom	—N/a		1:39.23	36	1:45.09	31	3:24.32	30
Bob Cochran	Giant slalom	—N/a		1:35.39	19	1:40.15	16	3:15.54	17
David Currier	Giant slalom	—N/a		DNF					
Hank Kashiwa	Giant slalom	—N/a		1:37.42	28	1:40.71	19	3:18.13	21
Rick Chaffee	Slalom	1:47.81	3	DNF					
Bob Cochran	Slalom	DSQ							
Terry Palmer	Slalom	1:45.82	4	58.78	21	55.50	13	1:54.28	16
Tyler Palmer	Slalom	Bye		57.68	15	54.37	4	1:52.05	9

Women

Athlete	Event	Run 1		Run 2		Total	
Athlete	Event	Time	Rank	Time	Rank	Time	Rank
Karen Budge	Downhill	—N/a				1:40.68	14
Marilyn Cochran	Downhill	—N/a				1:41.96	28
Susan Corrock	Downhill	—N/a				1:37.68	3rd place, bronze medalist(s)
Sandy Poulsen	Downhill	—N/a				1:41.25	21
Karen Budge	Giant slalom	—N/a				1:35.57	23
Barbara Cochran	Giant slalom	—N/a				1:33.16	11
Marilyn Cochran	Giant slalom	—N/a				1:35.27	20
Sandy Poulsen	Giant slalom	—N/a				DSQ	
Patty Boydstun	Slalom	48.11	13	47.48	9	1:35.59	8
Barbara Cochran	Slalom	46.05	1	45.19	2	1:31.24	1st place, gold medalist(s)
Marilyn Cochran	Slalom	DSQ					
Susan Corrock	Slalom	48.09	12	47.67	10	1:35.76	9

== Biathlon ==
Athlete	Event	Time	Misses	Rank
Jay Bowerman	Individual	1:29:13.71	7	45
Dennis Donahue	Individual	1:23:20.39	4	24
Peter Karns	Individual	1:20:59.67	2	14
Terry Morse	Individual	1:28:40.14	7	41
Jay Bowerman; Dennis Donahue; Peter Karns; Terry Morse	Relay	1:57:24.32	1 (0+1)	6

== Bobsleigh ==
Athlete	Event	Run 1		Run 2		Run 3		Run 4		Total	
Athlete	Event	Time	Rank	Time	Rank	Time	Rank	Time	Rank	Time	Rank
Paul Lamey; Howard Siler	Two-man	1:18.13	16	1:16.93	12	1:15.52	15	1:16.04	16	5:06.62	16
Boris Said; Thomas Becker	Two-man	1:17.34	13	1:17.23	15	1:16.66	21	1:17.71	20	5:08.94	19
Jim Hickey; Jim Bridges; Howard Siler; Thomas Becker	Four-man	DSQ									
Boris Said; James Copley; Ken Morris; Phil Duprey	Four-man	1:12.31	13	1:12.34	7	1:11.80	14	1:11.98	12	4:48.43	14

== Cross-country skiing ==
Men

Athlete	Event	Time	Rank
Tim Caldwell	15 km	51:17.92	54
Everett Dunklee	15 km	49:52.20	44
Larry Martin	15 km	53:13.91	58
Ronny Yeager	15 km	51:36.54	55
Mike Elliott	30 km	1:43:15.03	26
Mike Gallagher	30 km	1:43:39.41	30
Bob Gray	30 km	1:46:38.31	42
Clark Matis	30 km	1:52:18.52	53
Everett Dunklee	50 km	2:56:42.49	27
Bob Gray	50 km	3:01:15.37	33
Joe McNulty	50 km	DNF	
Gene Morgan	50 km	2:54:01.52	24
Tim Caldwell; Mike Elliott; Mike Gallagher; Larry Martin	4 × 10 km relay	2:14:37.28	12

Women

Athlete	Event	Time	Rank
Barbara Britch	5 km	18:18.37	31
Margie Mahoney	5 km	19:15.13	39
Alison Owen-Spencer	5 km	18:54.76	36
Martha Rockwell	5 km	17:50.34	18
Trina Hosmer	10 km	40:40.56	41
Margie Mahoney	10 km	39:27.95	36
Alison Owen-Spencer	10 km	38:50.05	35
Martha Rockwell	10 km	36:34.22	16
Barbara Britch; Alison Owen-Spencer; Martha Rockwell	3 × 5 km relay	53:38.60	11

== Figure skating ==
Individual

Athlete	Event	CF	FS	Total		
Athlete	Event	Rank	Rank	Points	Places	Rank
Gordon McKellen	Men's singles	10	9	2511.0	89	10
John Misha Petkevich	Men's singles	6	2	2591.5	47	5
Kenneth Shelley	Men's singles	5	3	2596.0	43	4
Julie Lynn Holmes	Ladies' singles	2	8	2627.0	39	4
Janet Lynn	Ladies' singles	4	1	2663.1	27	3rd place, bronze medalist(s)
Suna Murray	Ladies' singles	13	9	2426.2	102	12

Mixed

Athlete	Event	SP	FS	Total		
Athlete	Event	Rank	Rank	Points	Places	Rank
Barbara Brown; Douglas Berndt	Pairs	12	13	366.9	114	12
Melissa Militano; Mark Militano	Pairs	8	7	393.0	65.5	7
JoJo Starbuck; Kenneth Shelley	Pairs	4	4	406.8	35	4

== Ice hockey ==
Summary

Team	Event	First round	Consolation game	Medal round					
Team	Event	Opposition Score	Opposition Score	Opposition Score	Opposition Score	Opposition Score	Opposition Score	Opposition Score	Rank
**United States men**	Men's tournament	Switzerland; **W** 5–3	Bye	Sweden; **L** 1–5	Czechoslovakia; **W** 5–2	Soviet Union; **L** 2–7	Finland; **W** 4–1	Poland; **W** 6–1	2nd place, silver medalist(s)

Roster
- Mike Curran
- Peter Sears
- Wally Olds
- Tom Mellor
- Frank Sanders
- Jim McElmury
- Charles Brown
- Dick McGlynn
- Ronald Naslund
- Robbie Ftorek
- Stu Irving
- Kevin Ahearn
- Henry Boucha
- Craig Sarner
- Timothy Sheehy
- Keith Christiansen
- Mark Howe

First Round
Winners (in bold) entered the Medal Round. Other teams played a consolation round for 7th-11th places.

Team 1	Score	Team 2
**United States**	5–3	Switzerland

Medal round

Rank	Team	Pld	W	L	T	GF	GA	Pts
1	Soviet Union	5	4	0	1	33	13	9
2	United States	5	3	2	0	18	15	6
3	Czechoslovakia	5	3	2	0	26	13	6
4	Sweden	5	2	2	1	17	13	5
5	Finland	5	2	3	0	14	24	4
6	Poland	5	0	5	0	9	39	0

- Sweden 5-1 USA
- USA 5-1 Czechoslovakia
- USSR 7-2 USA
- USA 4-1 Finland
- USA 6-1 Poland

== Luge ==
Men

Athlete	Event	Run 1		Run 2		Run 3		Run 4		Total	
Athlete	Event	Time	Rank	Time	Rank	Time	Rank	Time	Rank	Time	Rank
Ralph Havens	Singles	55.17	30	54.84	28	54.31	32	54.00	32	3:38.32	32
James Murray	Singles	55.31	33	55.22	34	53.94	27	53.46	23	3:37.93	28
Terry O'Brien	Singles	55.41	34	55.21	32	54.02	28	53.64	26	3:38.24	31
Bob Rock	Singles	55.98	38	55.25	35	53.85	26	1:13.96	44	3:59.04	44
Robert Berkley; Richard Cavanaugh	Doubles	46.58	17	46.59	17	—N/a				1:33.17	17
Jack Elder; Frank Jones	Doubles	46.48	16	46.11	14	—N/a				1:32.59	15

Women

Athlete	Event	Run 1		Run 2		Run 3		Run 4		Total	
Athlete	Event	Time	Rank	Time	Rank	Time	Rank	Time	Rank	Time	Rank
Peggy Frair	Singles	DNF									
Kathleen Ann Roberts-Homstad	Singles	47.68	19	46.64	15	46.17	14	45.49	12	3:05.98	15

== Nordic combined ==
Athlete	Event	Ski Jumping				Cross-country			Total	
Athlete	Event	Jump 1	Jump 2	Points	Rank	Time	Points	Rank	Points	Rank
Mike Devecka	Individual	77.6	79.5	157.1	27	50:00.0	205.735	6	362.835	21
Bob Kendall	Individual	67.9	71.1	139.0	38	54:34.0	164.635	38	303.635	39
Jim Miller	Individual	80.8	58.9	139.7	37	51:09.9	195.250	17	334.950	34
Teyck Weed	Individual	66.5	63.3	129.8	40	52:26.2	183.805	29	313.605	38

== Ski jumping ==
Athlete	Event	Jump 1		Jump 2		Total	
Athlete	Event	Distance	Points	Distance	Points	Points	Rank
Scott Berry	Normal hill	67.5	87.7	66.0	84.3	172.0	52
Jerry Martin	Normal hill	76.0	105.3	69.5	91.9	197.2	34
Ron Steele	Normal hill	75.0	99.2	71.5	93.1	192.3	41
Greg Swor	Normal hill	70.5	93.0	67.0	86.4	179.4	50
Scott Berry	Large hill	79.0	76.1	81.5	75.6	151.7	47
Jerry Martin	Large hill	89.0	89.1	77.5	74.0	163.1	36
Ron Steele	Large hill	86.5	86.6	89.0	91.1	177.7	25
Greg Swor	Large hill	80.5	77.2	91.5	95.6	172.8	30

== Speed skating ==
Men

Athlete	Event	Time	Rank
Neil Blatchford	500 m	40.67	15
Pete Eberling	500 m	40.58	11
Greg Lyman	500 m	41.30	20
John Wurster	500 m	DNF	
Dan Carroll	1500 m	2:07.24	7
Gary Jonland	1500 m	2:09.55	14
Clark King	1500 m	2:14.83	30
Bill Lanigan	1500 m	2:12.31	25
Dan Carroll	5000 m	7:44.72	10
Charles Gilmore	5000 m	8:03.04	20
Clark King	5000 m	8:07.20	21
Dan Carroll	10,000 m	15:44.41	9
Clark King	10,000 m	16:39.82	21

Women

Athlete	Event	Time	Rank
Anne Henning	500 m	43.33 OR	1st place, gold medalist(s)
Kay Lunda	500 m	44.95	7
Sheila Young	500 m	44.53	4
Anne Henning	1000 m	1:31.62	3rd place, bronze medalist(s)
Dianne Holum	1000 m	1:32.41	6
Sheila Young	1000 m	1:34.97	17
Connie Carpenter-Phinney	1500 m	2:23.93	7
Dianne Holum	1500 m	2:20.85 OR	1st place, gold medalist(s)
Leah Poulos	1500 m	2:31.29	24
Dianne Holum	3000 m	4:58.67	2nd place, silver medalist(s)
Jeanne Omelenchuk	3000 m	5:32.87	22
Leah Poulos	3000 m	5:17.38	17
