= Italy at the 1972 Winter Olympics =

- IOC code: ITA
- NOC: Italian National Olympic Committee
- Website: www.coni.it (in Italian)

in Sapporo
- Competitors: 44 (41 men, 3 women) in 9 sports
- Flag bearer: Luciano de Paolis
- Medals Ranked 8th: Gold 2 Silver 2 Bronze 1 Total 5

Winter Olympics appearances (overview)
- 1924; 1928; 1932; 1936; 1948; 1952; 1956; 1960; 1964; 1968; 1972; 1976; 1980; 1984; 1988; 1992; 1994; 1998; 2002; 2006; 2010; 2014; 2018; 2022; 2026

Italy competed at the 1972 Winter Olympics in Sapporo, Japan.

== Medalists ==
Medal	Name	Sport	Event
Gold	Gustavo Thoeni	Alpine skiing	Men's giant slalom
Gold	Paul Hildgartner; Walter Plaikner	Luge	Men's doubles
Silver	Gustavo Thoeni	Alpine skiing	Men's slalom
Silver	Nevio De Zordo; Adriano Frassinelli; Corrado Dal Fabbro; Gianni Bonichon	Bobsleigh	Four-man
Bronze	Rolando Thoeni	Alpine skiing	Men's slalom

== Alpine skiing ==
Men

Athlete	Event	Race 1		Race 2		Total	
Athlete	Event	Time	Rank	Time	Rank	Time	Rank
Gustavo Thoeni	Downhill					1:54.37	13
Stefano Anzi	Downhill					1:54.15	11
Giuliano Besson	Downhill					1:54.15	11
Marcello Varallo	Downhill					1:53.85	10
Rolando Thoeni	Giant Slalom	1:35.83	23	1:44.90	30	3:20.73	27
Helmuth Schmalzl	Giant Slalom	1:35.72	21	1:39.63	13	3:15.35	16
Eberardo Schmalzl	Giant Slalom	1:34.22	16	1:40.50	18	3:14.72	13
Gustavo Thoeni	Giant Slalom	1:32.19	3	1:37.43	2	3:09.62	1st place, gold medalist(s)

Men's slalom

Athlete	Classification		Final					
Athlete	Time	Rank	Time 1	Rank	Time 2	Rank	Total	Rank
Erwin Stricker	DSQ	–	DSQ	–	–	–	DSQ	–
Gustavo Thoeni	bye		56.69	8	53.59	1	1:50.28	2nd place, silver medalist(s)
Rolando Thoeni	bye		56.14	5	54.16	3	1:50.30	3rd place, bronze medalist(s)
Eberardo Schmalzl	bye		56.11	4	54.72	9	1:50.83	6

== Biathlon ==
Men

Event	Athlete	Time	Penalties	Adjusted time ^{1}	Rank
20 km	Lino Jordan	1'16:26.09	12	1'28:26.09	40
20 km	Pierantonio Clementi	1'19:28.74	6	1'25:28.74	31
20 km	Giovanni Astegiano	1'16:45.90	6	1'22:45.90	22
20 km	Willy Bertin	1'16:03.04	5	1'21:03.04	16

^{1} One minute added per close miss (a hit in the outer ring), two minutes added per complete miss.

Men's 4 x 7.5 km relay

Athletes	Race		
Athletes	Misses ^{2}	Time	Rank
Willy Bertin; Giovanni Astegiano; Corrado Varesco; Lino Jordan	6	1'59:47.62	10

^{2} A penalty loop of 200 metres had to be skied per missed target.

== Bobsleigh ==
Sled	Athletes	Event	Run 1		Run 2		Run 3		Run 4		Total	
Sled	Athletes	Event	Time	Rank	Time	Rank	Time	Rank	Time	Rank	Time	Rank
ITA-1	Gianfranco Gaspari; Mario Armano	Two-man	1:15.62	3	1:16.52	7	1:13.71	2	1:14.60	7	5:00.45	4
ITA-2	Enzo Vicario; Corrado Dal Fabbro	Two-man	1:17.20	12	1:16.77	9	1:14.23	5	1:15.46	14	5:03.66	10

Sled	Athletes	Event	Run 1		Run 2		Run 3		Run 4		Total	
Sled	Athletes	Event	Time	Rank	Time	Rank	Time	Rank	Time	Rank	Time	Rank
ITA-1	Nevio De Zordo; Adriano Frassinelli; Corrado Dal Fabbro; Gianni Bonichon	Four-man	1:11.39	5	1:11.33	1	1:10.19	2	1:10.92	4	4:43.83	2nd place, silver medalist(s)
ITA-2	Gianfranco Gaspari; Roberto Zandonella; Mario Armano; Luciano De Paolis	Four-man	1:11.89	10	1:12.49	12	1:11.11	8	1:11.24	6	4:46.73	8

== Cross-country skiing ==
Men

Event	Athlete	Race	
Event	Athlete	Time	Rank
15 km	Franco Nones	49:35.43	40
15 km	Gianfranco Stella	48:17.14	28
15 km	Tonio Biondini	48:10.09	27
15 km	Carlo Favre	47:59.07	24
30 km	Attilio Lombard	1'45:03.72	36
30 km	Renzo Chiocchetti	1'44:35.03	32
30 km	Ulrico Kostner	1'42:44.06	24
30 km	Elviro Blanc	1'41:44.32	20
50 km	Ulrico Kostner	DNF	–
50 km	Tonio Biondini	2'54:28.39	25
50 km	Attilio Lombard	2'51:39.65	22
50 km	Elviro Blanc	2'51:25.19	21

Men's 4 × 10 km relay

Athletes	Race	
Athletes	Time	Rank
Carlo Favre; Elviro Blanc; Renzo Chiocchetti; Ulrico Kostner	2'12:07.11	9

== Figure skating ==
Women

Athlete	CF	FS	Points	Places	Rank
Rita Trapanese	6	6	2574.8	55	7

== Luge ==
Men

Athlete	Run 1		Run 2		Run 3		Run 4		Total	
Athlete	Time	Rank	Time	Rank	Time	Rank	Time	Rank	Time	Rank
Leo Atzwanger	54.41	21	54.32	23	53.38	23	53.22	20	3:35.33	21
Paul Hildgartner	53.66	12	52.76	6	51.94	5	52.19	9	3:30.55	8
Emilio Lechner	53.59	11	53.49	13	52.20	8	52.13	8	3:31.41	11
Karl Brunner	53.14	9	53.26	11	52.28	10	52.19	9	3:30.87	9

(Men's) Doubles

Athletes	Run 1		Run 2		Total	
Athletes	Time	Rank	Time	Rank	Time	Rank
Paul Hildgartner; Walter Plaikner	44.21	1	44.14	2	1:28.35	1st place, gold medalist(s)
Sigisfredo Mair; Ernesto Mair	45.22	8	45.04	8	1:30.26	8

Women

Athlete	Run 1		Run 2		Run 3		Run 4		Total	
Athlete	Time	Rank	Time	Rank	Time	Rank	Time	Rank	Time	Rank
Erika Lechner	48.76	21	49.39	21	50.51	21	DNF	–	DNF	–
Sarah Felder	45.90	8	45.93	6	45.99	12	45.08	8	3:02.90	8

== Nordic combined ==
Events:

- normal hill ski jumping (Three jumps, best two counted and shown here.)
- 15 km cross-country skiing

Athlete	Event	Ski Jumping				Cross-country			Total	
Athlete	Event	Distance 1	Distance 2	Points	Rank	Time	Points	Rank	Points	Rank
Fabio Morandini	Individual	58.5	67.0	141.5	36	50:43.7	199.180	11	340.680	30
Ezio Damolin	Individual	70.0	73.5	175.2	21	50:58.1	197.020	13	372.220	16

== Ski jumping ==
Athlete	Event	Jump 1		Jump 2		Total	
Athlete	Event	Distance	Points	Distance	Points	Points	Rank
Ezio Damolin	Normal hill	68.0	87.0	62.5	75.7	162.7	55

== Speed skating ==
Men

Event	Athlete	Race	
Event	Athlete	Time	Rank
500 m	Bruno Toniolli	42.67	25
1500 m	Giancarlo Gloder	2:14.07	27
1500 m	Bruno Toniolli	2:10.24	18
5000 m	Bruno Toniolli	7:57.30	17
5000 m	Giancarlo Gloder	7:55.77	15
10,000 m	Giancarlo Gloder	16:21.42	17
10,000 m	Bruno Toniolli	16:14.52	16

== See also ==
- Italy at the FIS Alpine World Ski Championships 1972
