= Great Britain at the 1972 Winter Olympics =

- Flag of the United Kingdom
- IOC code: GBR
- NOC: British Olympic Association

in Sapporo
- Competitors: 37 (30 men, 7 women) in 7 sports
- Flag bearer: Mike Freeman (bobsleigh)
- Medals Ranked 12th: Gold 0 Silver 0 Bronze 0 Total 0

Winter Olympics appearances (overview)
- 1924; 1928; 1932; 1936; 1948; 1952; 1956; 1960; 1964; 1968; 1972; 1976; 1980; 1984; 1988; 1992; 1994; 1998; 2002; 2006; 2010; 2014; 2018; 2022; 2026

The United Kingdom of Great Britain and Northern Ireland competed as Great Britain at the 1972 Winter Olympics in Sapporo, Japan.

== Alpine skiing ==
Men

Athlete	Event	Race 1		Race 2		Total	
Athlete	Event	Time	Rank	Time	Rank	Time	Rank
Iain Finlayson	Downhill					2:06.50	50
Konrad Bartelski	Downhill					2:02.71	43
Alex Mapelli-Mozzi	Downhill					2:00.28	37
Royston Varley	Downhill					1:58.53	33
Alex Mapelli-Mozzi	Giant Slalom	DSQ	–	–	–	DSQ	–
Konrad Bartelski	Giant Slalom	DNF	–	–	–	DNF	–
Iain Finlayson	Giant Slalom	1:45.88	46	DNF	–	DNF	–
Royston Varley	Giant Slalom	?	41	DNF	–	DNF	–

Men's slalom

Athlete	Classification		Final					
Athlete	Time	Rank	Time 1	Rank	Time 2	Rank	Total	Rank
Iain Finlayson	DSQ	–	1:06.86	40	1:03.69	28	2:10.55	28
Konrad Bartelski	DSQ	–	DNF	–	–	–	DNF	–
Alex Mapelli-Mozzi	DSQ	–	DNF	–	–	–	DNF	–
Royston Varley	DNF	–	1:06.31	38	1:01.54	24	2:07.85	26

Women

Athlete	Event	Race 1		Race 2		Total	
Athlete	Event	Time	Rank	Time	Rank	Time	Rank
Carol Blackwood	Downhill					1:44.61	38
Divina Galica	Downhill					1:41.58	26
Gina Hathorn	Downhill					1:41.42	25
Valentina Iliffe	Downhill					1:41.36	23
Carol Blackwood	Giant Slalom					1:43.96	35
Valentina Iliffe	Giant Slalom					1:36.68	26
Gina Hathorn	Giant Slalom					1:33.57	14
Divina Galica	Giant Slalom					1:32.72	7
Carol Blackwood	Slalom	DNF	–	–	–	DNF	–
Valentina Iliffe	Slalom	DNF	–	–	–	DNF	–
Divina Galica	Slalom	51.13	22	49.37	13	1:40.50	15
Gina Hathorn	Slalom	48.72	14	47.46	8	1:36.18	11

== Biathlon ==
Men

Event	Athlete	Time	Penalties	Adjusted time ^{1}	Rank
20 km	Malcolm Hirst	1'20:55.59	14	1'34:55.59	53
20 km	Alan Notley	1'21:48.72	7	1'28:48.72	43
20 km	Jeffrey Stevens	1'19:28.95	4	1'23:28.95	26
20 km	Keith Oliver	1'17:40.31	3	1'20:40.31	11

^{1} One minute added per close miss (a hit in the outer ring), two minutes added per complete miss.

Men's 4 x 7.5 km relay

Athletes	Race		
Athletes	Misses ^{2}	Time	Rank
Malcolm Hirst; Keith Oliver; Jeffrey Stevens; Alan Notley	5	2'01:38.84	11

^{2} A penalty loop of 200 metres had to be skied per missed target.

== Bobsleigh ==
Sled	Athletes	Event	Run 1		Run 2		Run 3		Run 4		Total	
Sled	Athletes	Event	Time	Rank	Time	Rank	Time	Rank	Time	Rank	Time	Rank
GBR-1	John Evelyn; Peter Clifford	Two-man	1:18.60	19	1:17.23	15	1:15.80	19	1:17.38	19	5:09.01	20
GBR-2	John Hammond; Michael Sweet	Two-man	1:18.09	15	1:18.18	19	1:15.71	18	1:14.98	10	5:06.96	17

Sled	Athletes	Event	Run 1		Run 2		Run 3		Run 4		Total	
Sled	Athletes	Event	Time	Rank	Time	Rank	Time	Rank	Time	Rank	Time	Rank
GBR-1	John Evelyn; Mike Freeman; Gomer Lloyd; Michael Sweet	Four-man	1:12.83	16	1:13.65	17	1:12.55	15	1:12.00	13	4:51.03	16
GBR-2	John Hammond; Jackie Price; Alan Jones; Peter Clifford	Four-man	1:13.00	17	1:12.49	12	1:12.72	16	1:12.25	15	4:50.46	15

== Cross-country skiing ==
Men

Event	Athlete	Race	
Event	Athlete	Time	Rank
15 km	Harold Tobin	56:05.05	61
15 km	Peter Strong	54:41.99	60
15 km	Terence Palliser	54:11.98	59
30 km	Terence Palliser	1'54:39.41	55
30 km	Keith Oliver	1'54:10.60	45

Women

Event	Athlete	Race	
Event	Athlete	Time	Rank
5 km	Frances Lütken	19:40.17	42
10 km	Frances Lütken	40:02.73	39

== Figure skating ==
Men

Athlete	CF	FS	Points	Places	Rank
John Curry	8	12	2512.2	85	11
Haig Oundjian	9	7	2538.8	65	7

Women

Athlete	CF	FS	Points	Places	Rank
Jean Scott	9	11	2436.8	101	11

Pairs

Athletes	SP	FS	Points	Places	Rank
Linda Connolly; Colin Taylforth	14	14	360.6	126	14

== Luge ==
Men

Athlete	Run 1		Run 2		Run 3		Run 4		Total	
Athlete	Time	Rank	Time	Rank	Time	Rank	Time	Rank	Time	Rank
Rupert Deen	59.21	43	59.65	44	58.10	44	58.58	43	3:55.54	43
Richard Liversedge	57.38	42	57.08	43	55.71	43	56.32	42	3:46.49	42
Jeremy Palmer-Tomkinson	57.23	41	55.59	38	55.36	42	55.43	41	3:43.61	40
Jonnie Woodall	55.11	29	55.21	33	54.78	38	55.05	38	3:40.15	34

(Men's) Doubles

Athletes	Run 1		Run 2		Total	
Athletes	Time	Rank	Time	Rank	Time	Rank
Stephen Marsh; Jonnie Woodall	46.77	18	47.05	19	1:33.82	19
Michel de Carvalho; Jeremy Palmer-Tomkinson	47.09	20	47.50	20	1:34.59	20

== Speed skating ==
Men

Event	Athlete	Race	
Event	Athlete	Time	Rank
500 m	David Hampton	42.59	24
1500 m	John Blewitt	2:18.96	37
1500 m	David Hampton	2:14.60	29
5000 m	John Blewitt	8:16.75	26
5000 m	David Hampton	8:07.85	22
10,000 m	John Blewitt	16:51.50	23
10,000 m	David Hampton	16:39.01	20
