= Bobsleigh at the 1972 Winter Olympics – Two-man =

Two-man at the XI Olympic Winter Games
- Venue: Sapporo Teine
- Dates: 4–5 February 1972
- Competitors: 42 from 11 nations
- Winning time: 4:57.07

Medalists
1st place, gold medalist(s)		West Germany; Wolfgang Zimmerer, Peter Utzschneider
2nd place, silver medalist(s)		West Germany; Horst Floth, Pepi Bader
3rd place, bronze medalist(s)		Switzerland; Jean Wicki, Edy Hubacher

The Two-man bobsleigh competition at the 1972 Winter Olympics in Sapporo was held on 4 and 5 February, at Sapporo Teine.

== Results ==
Rank	Country	Athletes	Run 1	Run 2	Run 3	Run 4	Total
1st place, gold medalist(s)	West Germany (FRG-2)	Wolfgang Zimmerer; Peter Utzschneider	74.81	74.56	73.51	74.19	4:57.07
2nd place, silver medalist(s)	West Germany (FRG-1)	Horst Floth; Pepi Bader	76.04	75.38	74.35	73.07	4:58.84
3rd place, bronze medalist(s)	Switzerland (SUI-1)	Jean Wicki; Edy Hubacher	75.61	75.36	74.36	74.00	4:59.33
4	Italy (ITA-1)	Gianfranco Gaspari; Mario Armano	75.62	76.52	73.71	74.60	5:00.45
5	Romania (ROU-1)	Ion Panţuru; Ion Zangor	76.50	75.31	74.04	74.68	5:00.53
6	Sweden	Carl-Erik Eriksson; Jan Johansson	76.68	76.81	74.08	73.83	5:01.40
7	Switzerland (SUI-2)	Hans Candrian; Heinz Schenker	75.89	76.84	74.38	74.33	5:01.44
8	Austria (AUT-1)	Herbert Gruber; Josef Oberhauser	76.48	76.34	74.44	74.34	5:01.60
9	France (FRA-1)	Patrick Parisot; Alain Roy	76.66	77.17	74.53	75.10	5:03.46
10	Italy (ITA-2)	Enzo Vicario; Corrado Dal Fabbro	77.20	76.77	74.23	75.46	5:03.66
11	France (FRA-2)	Gérard Christaud-Pipola; Jacques Christaud-Pipola	77.08	77.25	74.81	75.05	5:04.19
12	Romania (ROU-2)	Dragoș Panaitescu-Rapan; Dumitru Focşeneanu	77.98	77.00	74.67	75.24	5:04.89
13	Austria (AUT-2)	Werner Delle Karth; Fritz Sperling	76.99	77.91	75.84	74.61	5:05.35
14	Canada (CAN-2)	Bob Storey; Michael Hartley	78.49	76.70	74.90	75.61	5:05.70
15	Japan (JPN-1)	Susumu Esashika; Kazumi Abe	78.13	76.43	75.17	76.86	5:06.59
16	United States (USA-1)	Paul Lamey; Howard Siler, Jr.	78.13	76.93	75.52	76.04	5:06.62
17	Great Britain (GBR-2)	John Hammond; Bill Sweet	78.09	78.18	75.71	74.98	5:06.96
18	United States (USA-2)	Boris Said, Jr. Thomas Becker	77.34	76.93	76.66	77.71	5:08.64
19	Canada (CAN-1)	Hans Gehrig; Andrew Faulds	78.82	78.36	75.66	76.06	5:08.90
20	Great Britain (GBR-1)	John Evelyn; Peter Clifford	78.60	77.23	75.80	77.38	5:09.01
21	Japan (JPN-2)	Akihiko Suzuki; Rikio Sato	78.98	78.46	75.63	78.84	5:11.91
