= Willy Bertin =

Italian skier

Personal information
- Born: 26 August 1944 (age 81) Angrogna, Italy

Sport
- Sport: Skiing

Willy Bertin (born 26 August 1944) is an Italian ski mountaineer and former cross-country skier and biathlete.

Bertin was born in Angrogna. Together with Felice Darioli and Lino Zanon he finished fourth in the 1971, and second in the 1973 Trofeo Mezzalama, and together with Darioli and Fabrizio Pedranzini, he placed third in the military team category in the 1975 edition of the same competition, which was carried out as the first World Championship of Skimountaineering.

== Selected biathlon results ==
- 1970: 2nd, Italian championships of biathlon, large calibre
- 1971: 2nd, Italian championships of biathlon
- 1972:
  - 3rd, Italian championships of biathlon, large calibre
  - 10th, Winter Olympics 4 × 7.5 kilometres relay (together with Giovanni Astegiano, Corrado Varesco and Lino Jordan)
  - 16th, Winter Olympics 20 kilometres
  - 1st, Italian men's championships of cross-country skiing, relay, together with Felice Darioli, Serafino Guadagnini and Renzo Chiocchetti
- 1975: 3rd, Italian championships of biathlon, large calibre
- 1974:
  - 1st, Italian championships of biathlon
  - 3rd, Italian championships of biathlon, sprint large calibre
- 1975: 2nd, Italian championships of biathlon, sprint large calibre
- 1976:
  - 1st, Italian championships of biathlon, sprint
  - 2nd, Italian championships of biathlon
  - 4th, Winter Olympics 20 kilometres
  - 6th, Winter Olympics 4 × 7.5 kilometres relay (together with Lino Jordan, Pierantonio Clementi and Luigi Weiss)
- 1977:
  - 1st, Italian championships of biathlon
  - 2nd, Italian championships of biathlon, sprint
- 1978:
  - 1st, Italian championships of biathlon
  - 2nd, Italian championships of biathlon, sprint

== Selected cross-country skiing results ==
- 1972: 3rd, Italian men's championships of skiing, 15 km
