= Zwönitz =

- Town
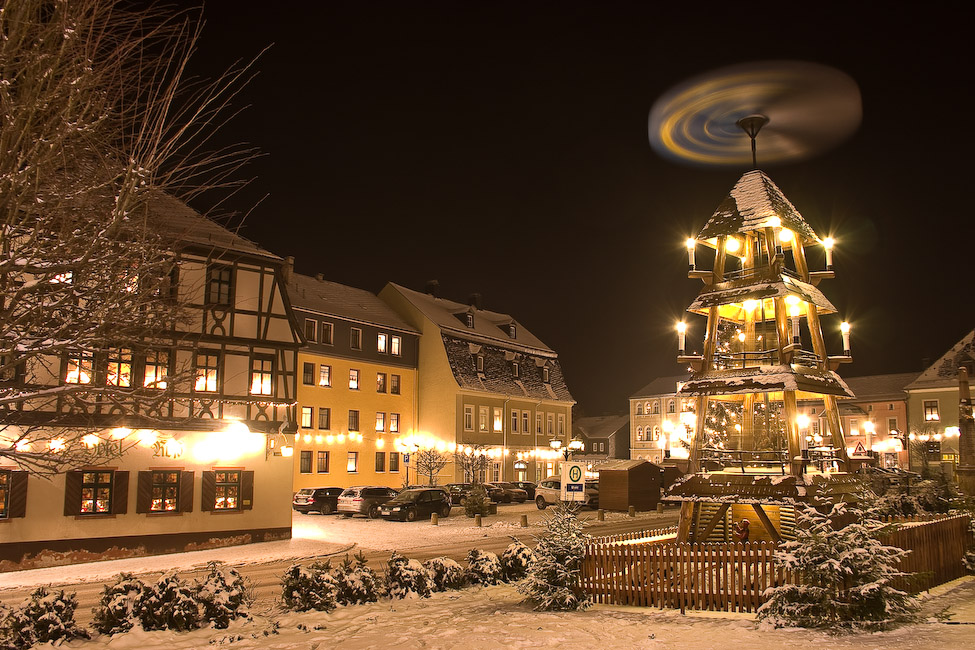
- Zwönitz during Christmas time

- Coat of arms

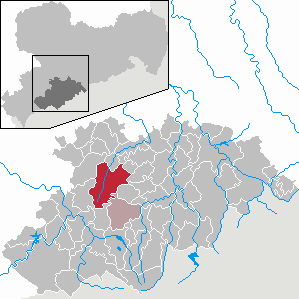
- Location of Zwönitz within Erzgebirgskreis district
- Interactive map of Zwönitz
- Location within Germany Location within Saxony
- Coordinates: 50°37′N 12°48′E
- Country: Germany
- State: Saxony
- District: Erzgebirgskreis
- Subdivisions: 7 neighbourhoods

Government
  - Mayor (2022–29): Wolfgang Triebert (CDU)

Area
  - Total: 64.24 km^{2} (24.80 sq mi)
- Elevation: 550 m (1,800 ft)

Population (2025-12-31)
  - Total: 11,244
  - Density: 175.0/km^{2} (453.3/sq mi)
- Time zone: UTC+01:00 (CET)
  - Summer (DST): UTC+02:00 (CEST)
- Postal codes: 08297
- Dialling codes: 037754
- Vehicle registration: ERZ, STL
- Website: www.zwoenitz.de

Zwönitz (German pronunciation: [ˈtsvøːnɪts]; Upper Sorbian: Zwonica) is a town in the district Erzgebirgskreis, in Saxony, Germany. It is situated 9 km (5.6 mi) south of Stollberg, and 24 km (15 mi) southwest of Chemnitz.

== Parts of the town ==
Zwönitz consists of:

- Brünlos
- Dorfchemnitz
- Günsdorf
- Hormersdorf
- Kühnhaide
- Lenkersdorf
- Niederzwönitz

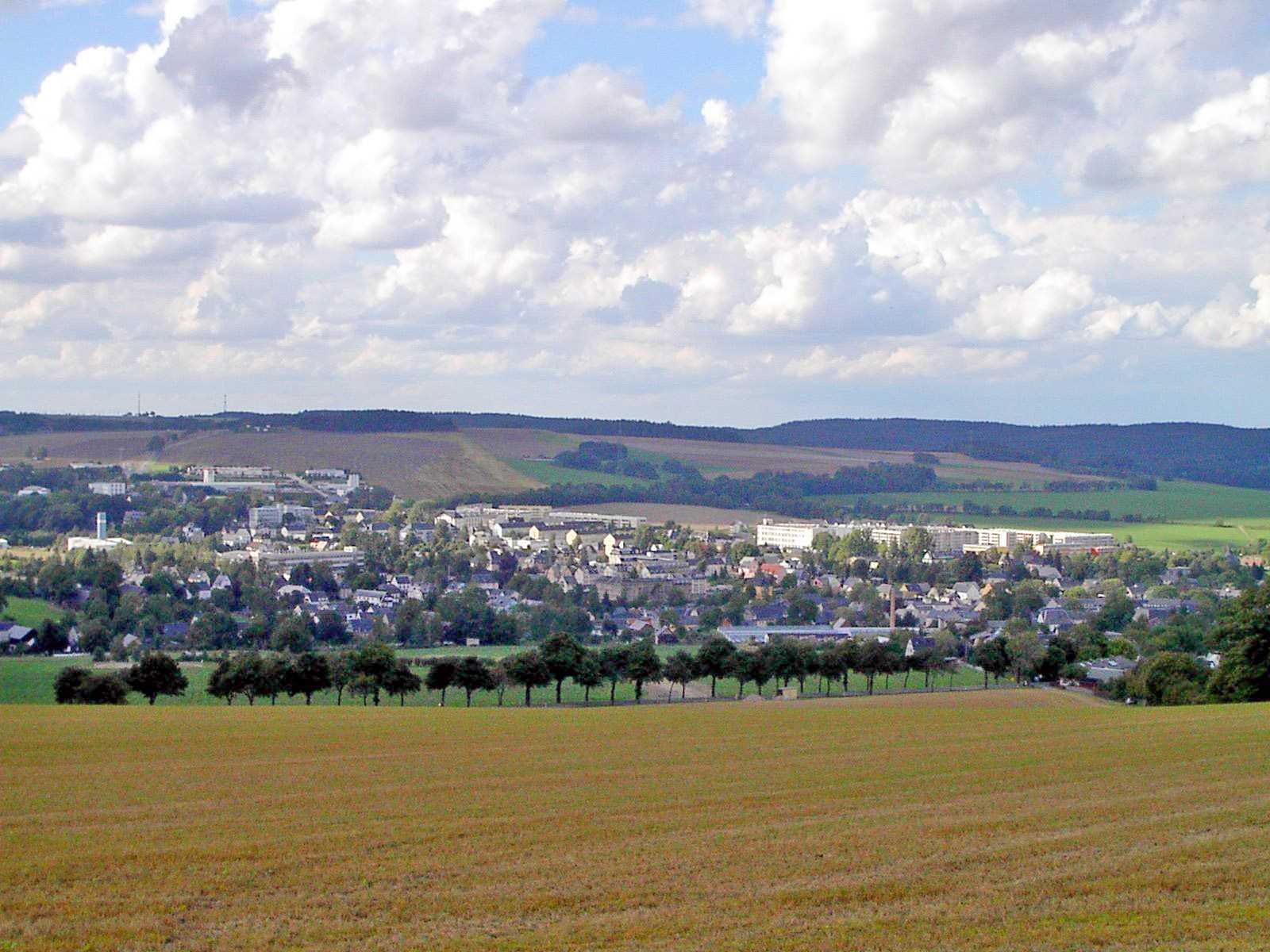
Zwönitz

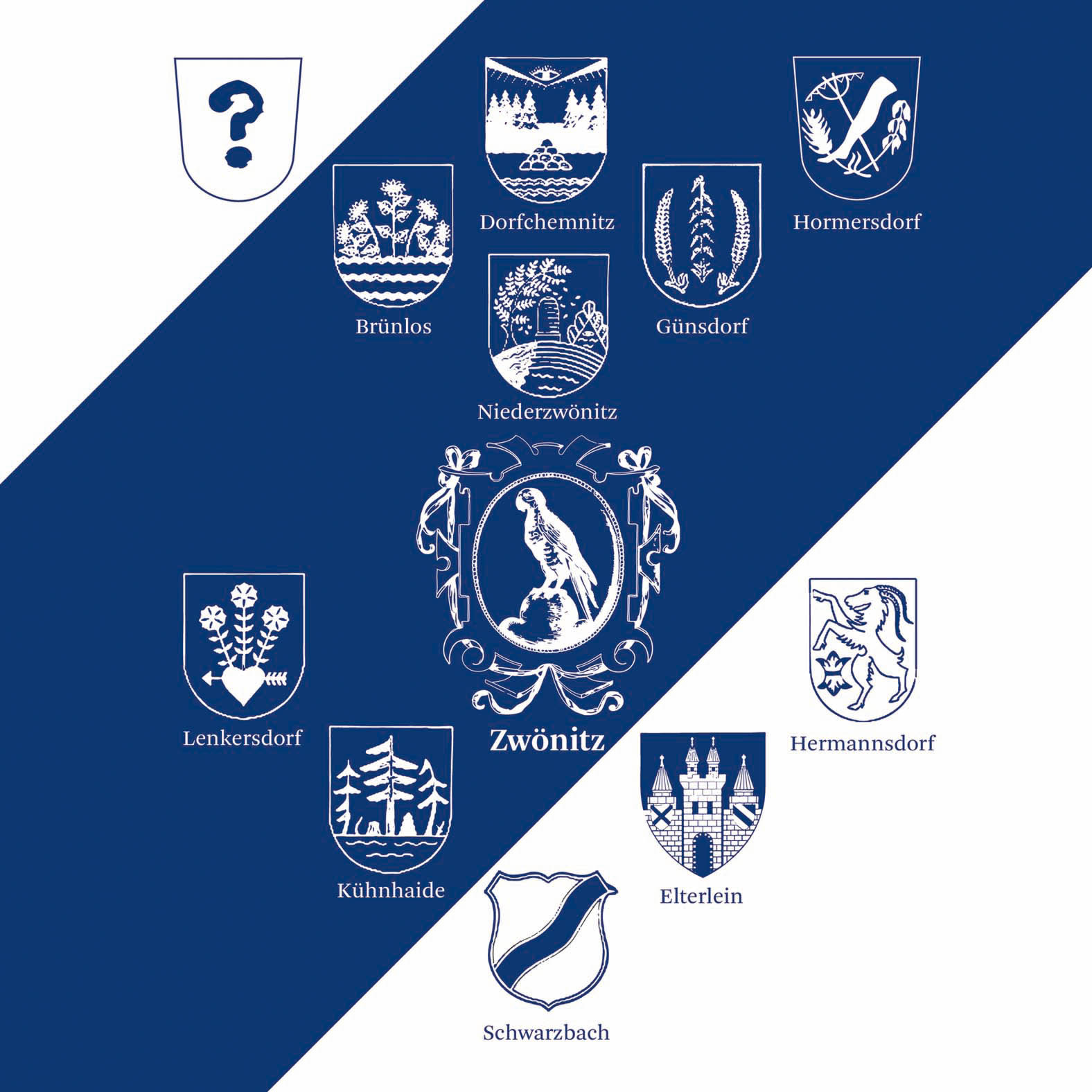
Zwönitz and its villages and the joint administration Zwönitz-Elterlein

== Population ==
- 1542 – 570
- 1697 – 741
- 1780 – 863
- 1800 – 1,242
- 1840 – 1,883
- 1890 – 2,931
- 1926 – 3,760
- 1933 – 3,852
- 1946 – 7,500
- 1950 – 10,617
- 1960 – 8,307
- 1965 – 9,690
- 1981 – 11,362
- 1990 – 13,105
- 1995 – 12,318
- 2000 – 12,175
- 2005 – 11,696
- 2010 – 11,193
- 2012 – 12,519

== Local council ==
The elections in May 2014 showed the following results:

- CDU: 16 Seats
- The Left: 4 Seats
- Unabhängige Wählervereinigung Zwönitz (UWZ): 3 Seats
- Freie Wähler Gemeinschaft e. V. (FWG) (Free voters): 2 Seats
- SPD: 1 Seat

== Mayors ==
- Uwe Schneider (CDU), 1990–2008
- Wolfgang Triebert (CDU), since 2008

== History ==
The town was founded by Slavs. The monastery Grünhain owned the area since 1286. Zwönitz received its town charter around the turn of the 13th century. It was a customs and trading point with market rights since 1545. From 1952 to 1990, Zwönitz was part of the Bezirk Karl-Marx-Stadt of East Germany.

== Twin towns – sister cities ==
Zwönitz is twinned with:

- Heiligenhaus, Germany
- Kopřivnice, Czech Republic
- Magyarpolány, Hungary
- Myszków, Poland
- Obermichelbach, Germany
- Puschendorf, Germany

== Notable people ==
- Samuel von Pufendorf (1632–1694), natural law philosopher and historian (born in Dorfchemnitz)
- Joachim Meischner (born 1946), biathlete
- Sepp Wiegand (born 1991), rally driver

== Gallery ==
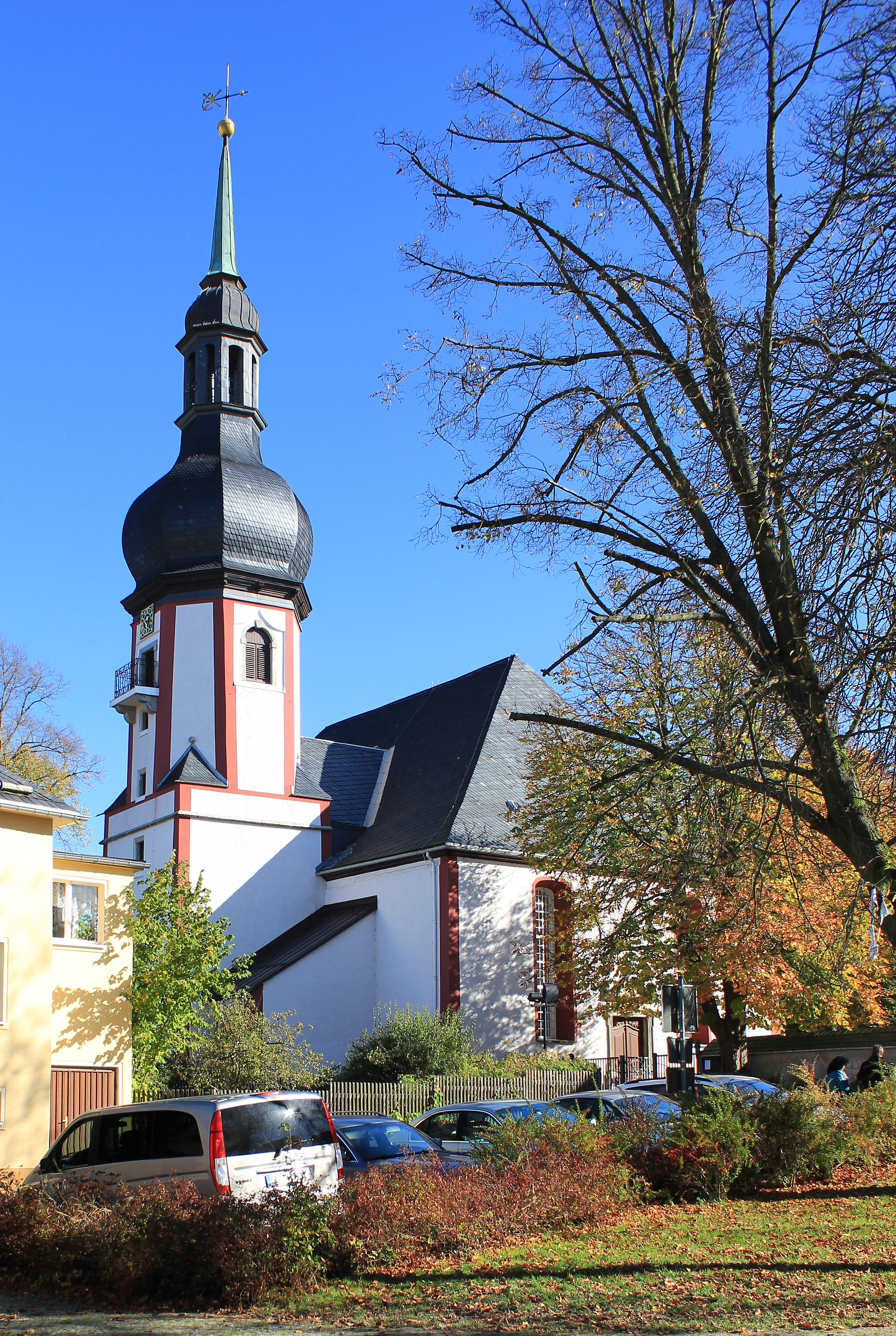
St. Trinitatis Church

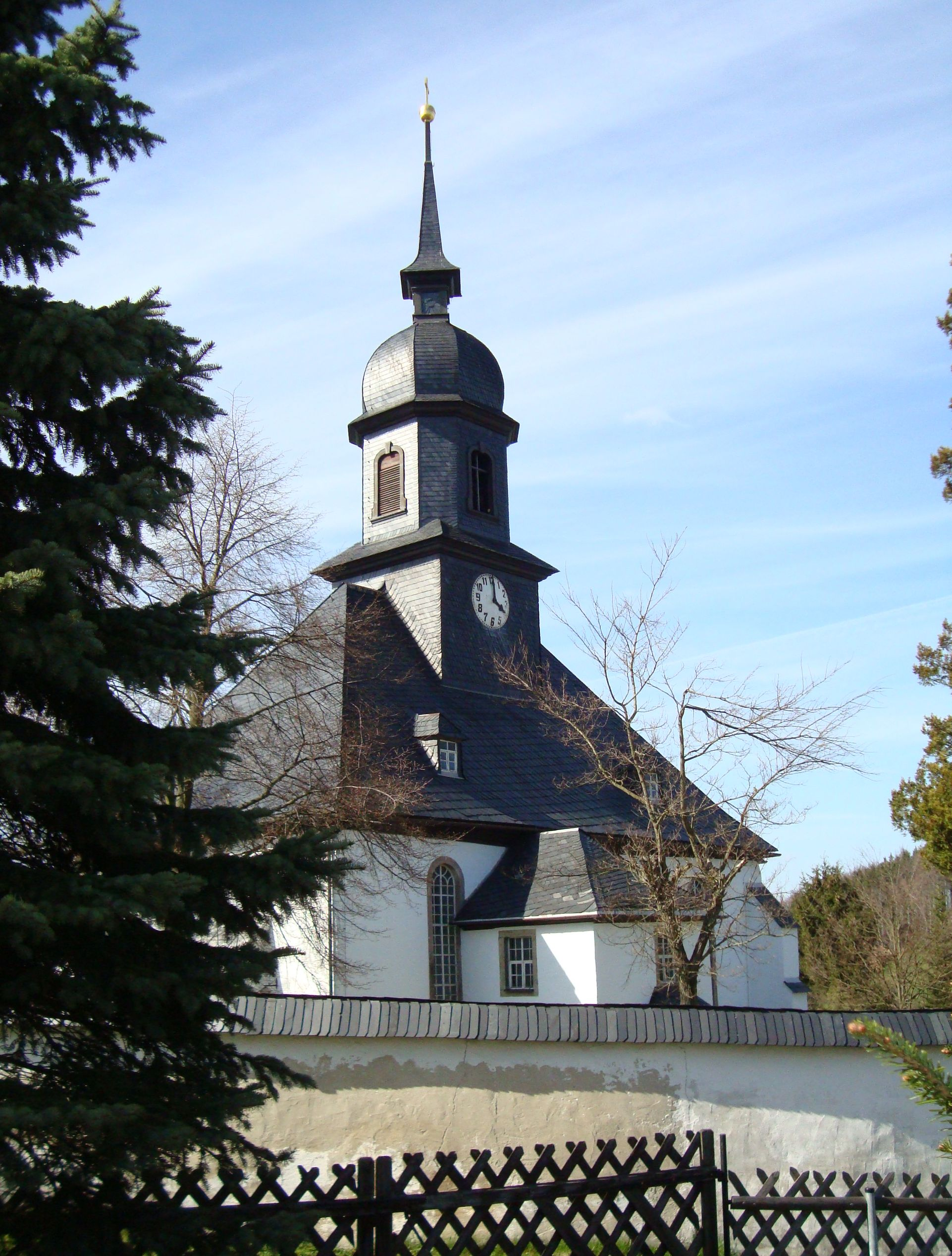
Church in Hormersdorf

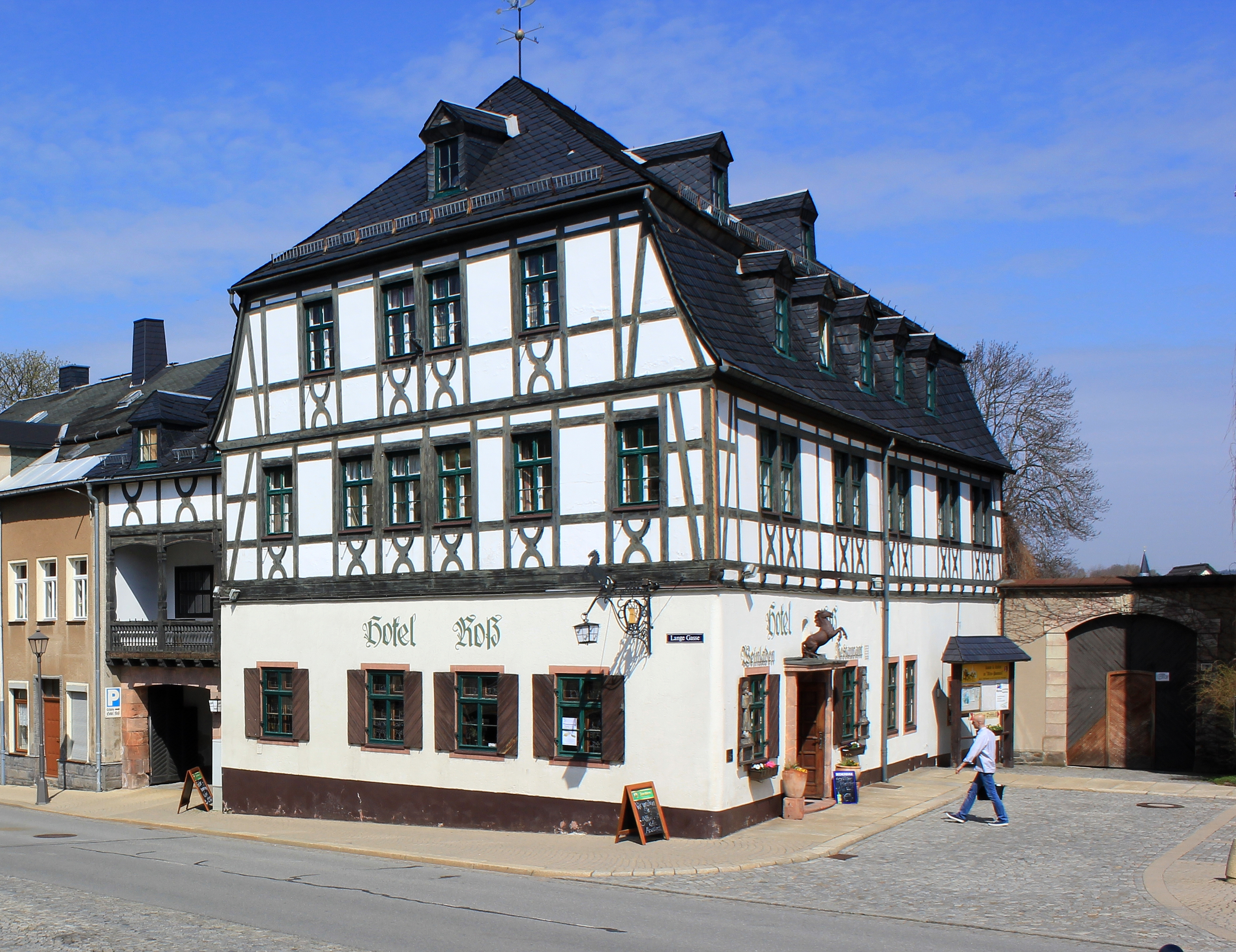
Half-timbered house (Hotel Roß)
