= Felice Darioli =

Italian cross-country skier

Personal information
- Born: 10 February 1947 (age 79) Bognanco, Italy

Sport
- Sport: Skiing
Medal record
ski mountaineering
Bronze medal – third place	1975 World Championship (Trofeo Mezzalama)	military team

Felice Darioli (born 10 February 1947) is an Italian cross-country skier.

Darioli was born in Bognanco. Together with Willy Bertin and Lino Zanon he finished fourth in the 1971, and second in the 1973 Trofeo Mezzalama, and as a non-commissioned officer in a team with Bertin and Fabrizio Pedranzini, he placed third in the military team category in the 1975 edition of the same competition, which was carried out as the first World Championship of Skimountaineering. He lives in Domodossola. He also won a Bronze medal in the relay event of the international CISM championships in Lebanon.

== Selected cross-country skiing results ==
- 1971:
  - 2nd, Italian men's championships of cross-country skiing, relay
  - 3rd, Italian men's championships of cross-country skiing, 50 km
- 1972:
  - 1st, Italian men's championships of cross-country skiing, relay, together with Willy Bertin, Serafino Guadagnini and Renzo Chiocchetti
  - 3rd, Italian men's championships of cross-country skiing, 30 km
