= Michael Hartley =

Michael or Mike Hartley may refer to:

- Mike Hartley (baseball) (born 1961), former Major League Baseball right-handed pitcher
- Michael Hartley (bobsleigh) (born 1946), Olympic bobsleigh competitor for Canada at the 1972 Winter Olympics
- Michael Hartley (footballer) (born 1993), Australian rules footballer
- Michael Hartley (rugby union), UAE rugby union player who competed at the 2011 Asian Five Nations
- Michael Hartley (high jumper), English high jumper who competed at the 2011 Commonwealth Youth Games
- Michael Carr-Hartley (born 1942), Kenyan Olympic sport shooter
- Mike Hartley (runner) (born 1952), British runner
