= Lino Jordan =

Italian biathlete (1944–2023)

Personal information
- Born: 15 May 1944 Saint-Rhémy-en-Bosses, Italy
- Died: 6 June 2023 (aged 79)

Sport
- Sport: Skiing

Lino Jordan (15 May 1944 – 6 June 2023) was an Italian biathlete. He competed at the 1972 Winter Olympics and the 1976 Winter Olympics.

Jordan was born in Saint-Rhémy-en-Bosses. Together with Mario Bacher and Franco Ceroni, he also finished third in the 1973 Trofeo Mezzalama ski mountaineering competition.

Jordan died on 6 June 2023, at the age of 79.

== Selected biathlon results ==
- 1971:
  - 3rd, Italian championships of biathlon
  - 3rd, Italian championships of biathlon, large calibre
- 1972:
  - 1st, Italian championships of biathlon
  - 10th, Winter Olympics 4 × 7.5 kilometres relay (together with Giovanni Astegiano, Corrado Varesco and Willy Bertin)
  - 40th, Winter Olympics 20 kilometres
- 1974: 2nd, Italian championships of biathlon, sprint
- 1975:
  - 1st, Italian championships of biathlon, sprint
  - 1st, Italian championships of biathlon, sprint large calibre
  - 2nd, Italian championships of biathlon
- 1976:
  - 6th, Winter Olympics 4 × 7.5 kilometres relay (together with Pierantonio Clementi, Luigi Weiss and Willy Bertin)
  - 7th, Winter Olympics 20 kilometres
- 1978:
  - 3rd, Italian championships of biathlon
  - 3rd, Italian championships of biathlon, sprint
- 1980: 3rd, Italian championships of biathlon
