= Peter Clifford =

Peter Clifford may refer to:

- Peter Clifford (cricketer) (born 1959), Australian cricketer
- Peter Clifford (bobsleigh) (born 1944), British bobsledder
- Pete Clifford (born 1984), American football offensive tackle
