= Isao Ono =

Isao Ono may refer to:

- Isao Ono (biathlete) (born 1942), Japanese Olympic biathlete
- Isao Ono (ice hockey) (born 1933), Japanese Olympic ice hockey player
