= Tuchenbach =

- Municipality
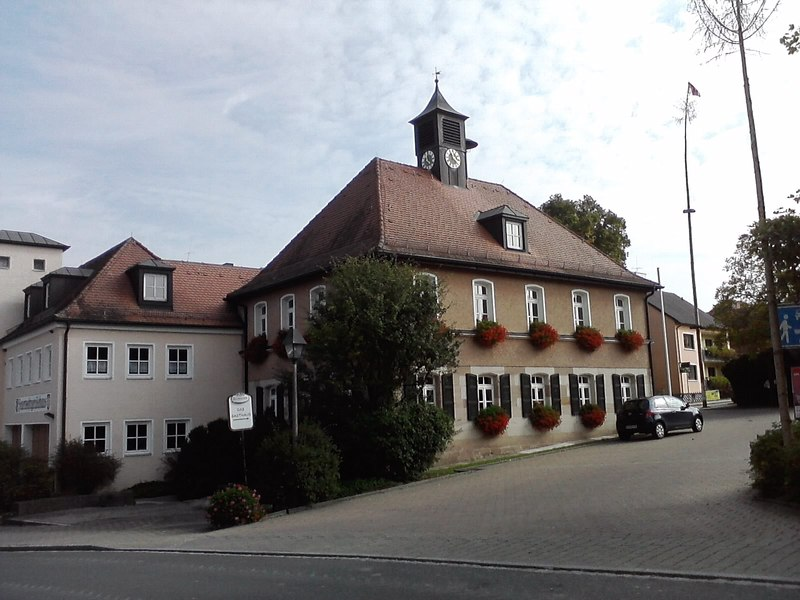
- Town hall

- Coat of arms

- Location of Tuchenbach within Fürth district
- Interactive map of Tuchenbach
- Location within Germany Location within Bavaria
- Coordinates: 49°32′N 10°52′E
- Country: Germany
- State: Bavaria
- Admin. region: Mittelfranken
- District: Fürth
- Municipal assoc.: Obermichelbach-Tuchenbach

Government
  - Mayor (2020–26): Leonhard Eder

Area
  - Total: 6.50 km^{2} (2.51 sq mi)
- Elevation: 345 m (1,132 ft)

Population (2025-12-31)
  - Total: 1,374
  - Density: 211/km^{2} (547/sq mi)
- Time zone: UTC+01:00 (CET)
  - Summer (DST): UTC+02:00 (CEST)
- Postal codes: 90587
- Dialling codes: 0911
- Vehicle registration: FÜ
- Website: www.tuchenbach.de

Tuchenbach is a municipality in the district of Fürth in Bavaria in Germany.

== Geography ==
Tuchenbach is located about 20 Kilometer west of Nuremberg. The closest villages are Obermichelbach, Veitsbronn, Puschendorf and the town of Herzogenaurach. The altitude is 345 Meters. The area of Tuchenbach is 6.50 km^{2}

== History ==
Tuchenbach was first officially mentioned in 1284.

== Population ==
The population was 1226 on 30 June 2007. The density is 184/m^{2}.

== Politics ==
Town Council

The Town Council has 13 members, including the mayor. The "Interessengemeinschaft Tuchenbach" has 8 seats, the SPD has 1 seats and the "Wählergemeinschaft Tuchenbach" has 3 seats (Election 2008).

Mayor

Leonhard Eder (Interessensgemeinschaft) was elected mayor on 3 March 2002 with 61.8%. He was re-elected on 2 March 2008 with 73.8%, and again in 2014 and 2020.

== Church ==
The "Friedenskirche" (Peace Church) including a cemetery was opened in 2000.

== Sport clubs ==
Sportfreunde Tuchenbach

The Sportreunde Tuchenbach have soccer teams, gym, archery, cycling and Ping-Pong.

Tennisclub Tuchenbach

The tennis club was founded is 1977 and it has 4 clay courts.

== Different ==
The ZIP-Code is 90587. The Area Code is 0911. The address of the townhall is Schulplatz 2, 90587 Tuchenbach
