= Noël Turrell =

French biathlete (1947–2006)

Personal information
- Nationality: French
- Born: 27 October 1947; Plateau d'Hauteville, France
- Died: 7 July 2006 (aged 58); Saint-Genis-Laval, France

Sport
- Sport: Biathlon

Noël Turrell (27 October 1947 – 7 July 2006) was a French biathlete. He competed in the relay event at the 1972 Winter Olympics.
