= Joachim Meischner =

East German biathlete

Medal record

Representing East Germany

Men's biathlon

Olympic Games
| Bronze medal – third place | 1972 Sapporo | 4 x 7.5 km relay |

Joachim Meischner (born 13 August 1946 in Zwönitz) is a retired East German biathlete.

He represented the sports club SG Dynamo Zinnwald / Sportvereinigung (SV) Dynamo. He won the bronze medal at the Winter Olympics in Sapporo 1972.
