= Obermichelbach-Tuchenbach =

- Verwaltungsgemeinschaft
- Location of Obermichelbach-Tuchenbach within Fürth district
- Interactive map of Obermichelbach-Tuchenbach
- Location within Germany Location within Bavaria
- Coordinates: 49°32′N 10°55′E
- Country: Germany
- State: Bavaria
- Admin. region: Middle Franconia
- District: Fürth
- Seat: Obermichelbach
- Subdivisions: 2 municipalities

Area
  - Total: 15.75 km^{2} (6.08 sq mi)

Population (2025-12-31)
  - Total: 4,561
  - Density: 289.6/km^{2} (750.0/sq mi)
- Time zone: UTC+01:00 (CET)
  - Summer (DST): UTC+02:00 (CEST)
- Website: www.vg-obermichelbach-tuchenbach.de

Obermichelbach-Tuchenbach is a Verwaltungsgemeinschaft (municipal association) in the district of Fürth in Bavaria, Germany. Its seat is in Obermichelbach.

It consists of the following municipalities:

1. Obermichelbach
2. Tuchenbach
