= Stanislav Fajstavr =

Czech biathlete (born 1943)

Personal information
- Nationality: Czech
- Born: 6 May 1943 (age 81); Benetzko, Reichsgau Sudetenland, Germany

Sport
- Sport: Biathlon

Stanislav Fajstavr (born 6 May 1943) was a Czech biathlete. He competed in the 20 km individual event at the 1972 Winter Olympics.
