= Fundata =

- Commune
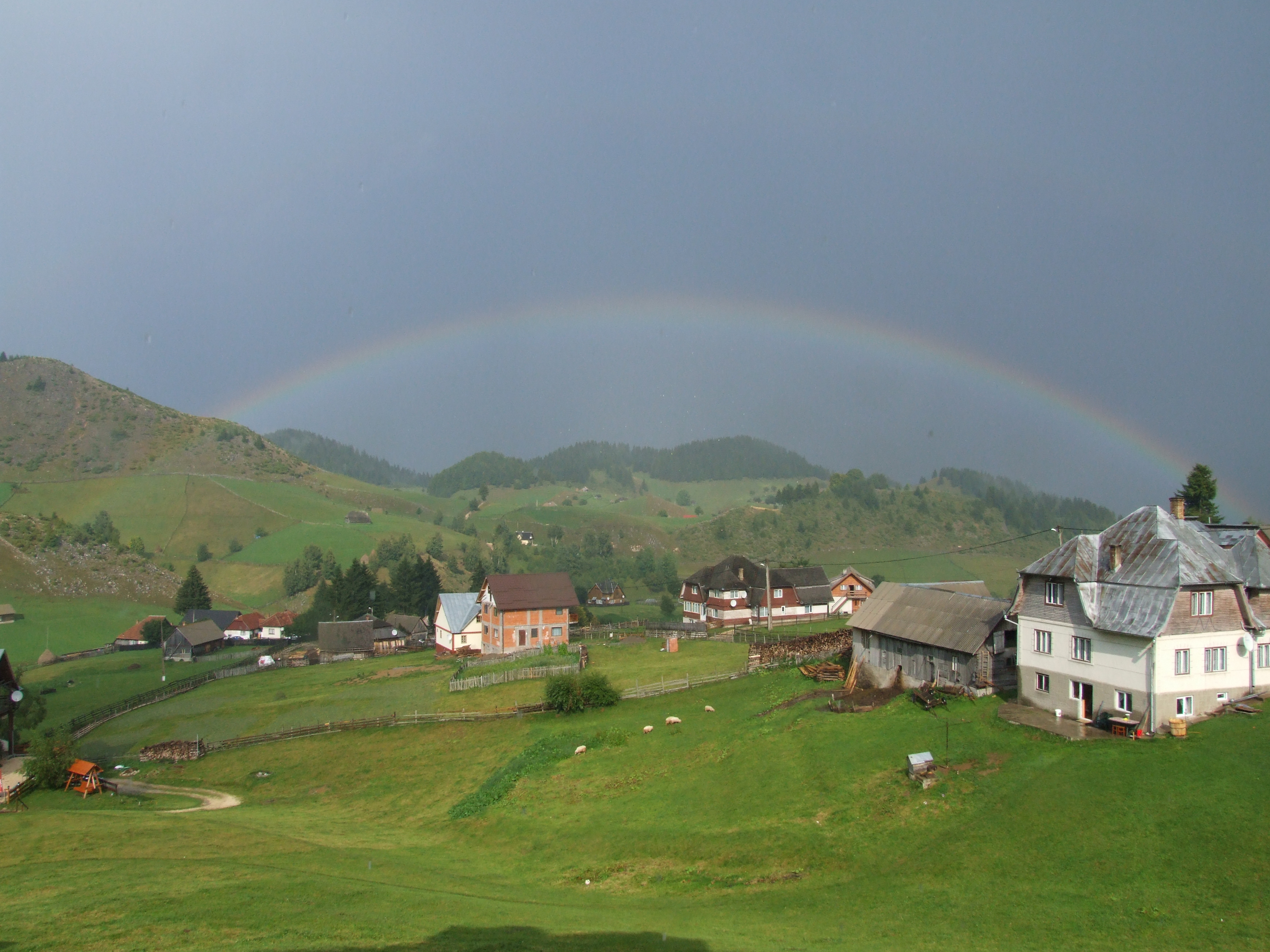
- Rainbow in Fundata

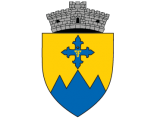
- Coat of arms

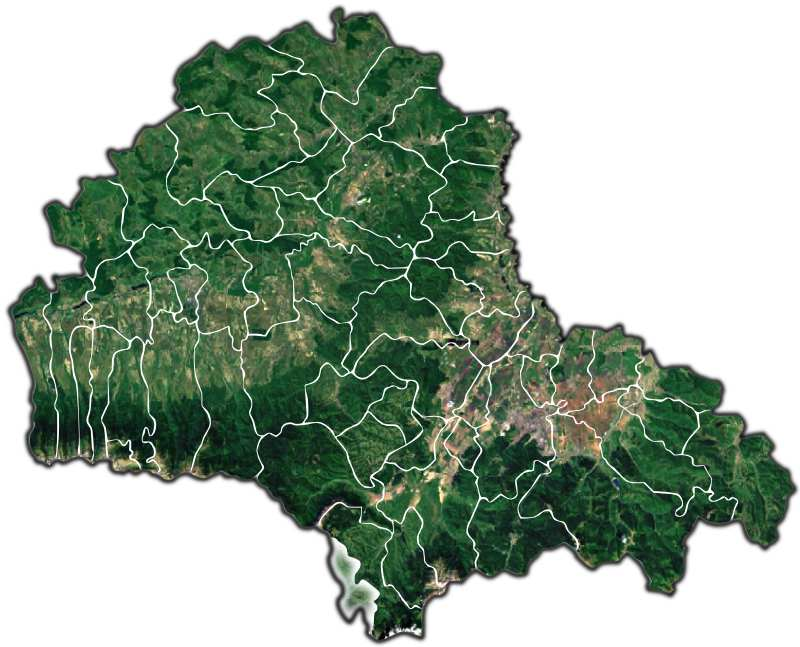
- Location of Fundata, Brașov

- Location in Romania
- Coordinates: 45°26′17″N 25°17′41″E
- Country: Romania
- County: Brașov

Government
  - Mayor (2020–2024): Marian-Florin Pâtea (PNL)
- Area: 36.81 km^{2} (14.21 sq mi)
- Elevation: 1,360 m (4,460 ft)
- Population (2021-12-01): 683
  - Density: 18.6/km^{2} (48.1/sq mi)
- Time zone: UTC+02:00 (EET)
  - Summer (DST): UTC+03:00 (EEST)
- Postal code: 507070
- Area code: +(40) x59
- Vehicle reg.: BV
- Website: primariafundata.ro

Fundata (German: Fundatten; Hungarian: Fundáta) is a commune in Brașov County, Romania, in the historic region of Transylvania. It is composed of three villages: Fundata, Fundățica (Kleinkertzberg; Kisfundáta), and Șirnea (Schirnen; Sirnea). The place offers panoramas for the Piatra Craiului Mountains and Bucegi Mountains. During the 2013 European Youth Olympic Winter Festival, it held the biathlon competition in the new venue of the town.

== Presentation ==
Surrounded by the Bucegi Mountains and the Piatra Craiului Mountains, Fundata's altitude of 1,360 m (4,460 ft) makes it the highest commune in Romania. Șirnea was first attested in 1729, and Fundata in 1732. It lies on the southern border of Brașov County, with Argeș County on the other side, in the middle of the Rucăr–Bran Pass, along European route E574. It is 42 km (26 mi) from Brașov and 26 km (16 mi) from Râșnov.

In August 1916, when troops from the Romanian Old Kingdom entered Austria-Hungary, the first village they took was Fundata, also capturing their first prisoners there and suffering their first battle death.

A traditional lifestyle of herding sheep and cows is preserved, augmented by tourism. Indeed, Șirnea was declared the country's first tourist village in 1968. Aside from the mountainous scenery, attractions in Fundata include a wooden Romanian Orthodox church (1830) and one of stone (1939–1943); in Șirnea, there is a church from 1893–1894 as well as an ethnographic museum. There is an annual festival held around July 20, feast of the prophet Elijah, called Nedeia Munților ("Mountain Celebration"). Originally a "feast of two countries" (Transylvania and Wallachia), it was revived in 1969, and features folklore displays as well as local cheeses and meats.

At the 2011 census, all but one of the commune's 852 inhabitants were ethnic Romanians. At the 2021 census, Fundata had a population of 683; of those, 95.75% were Romanians.

== Climate ==
Fundata has a cool continental mountain climate, influenced by its elevation and location between the Bucegi, Piatra Craiului and Leaota mountains. The village is served by the Fundata meteorological station (1,384 m), established in 1950, with precipitation observations dating back to 1924. The station records an annual average precipitation of 907.5 mm and an average wind speed of 3 m/s. Snow cover persists for an average of 132 days per year, while snowfall occurs on approximately 70 days annually. The highest 24-hour precipitation total recorded is 120.8 mm (23 June 2012), and the maximum snow depth reached 166 cm (14 March 1984). Temperatures have ranged from −25.9 °C (24 December 1933) to 29.7 °C (25 August 2012).

Climate data for Fundata (elevation 1384m, 2014–2026 normals, sun 1997–2006, extremes 1961–present)
Month	Jan	Feb	Mar	Apr	May	Jun	Jul	Aug	Sep	Oct	Nov	Dec	Year
Record high °C (°F)	14.9 (58.8)	15.0 (59.0)	18.8 (65.8)	22.4 (72.3)	26.1 (79.0)	28.3 (82.9)	28.9 (84.0)	29.7 (85.5)	27.7 (81.9)	23.5 (74.3)	19.0 (66.2)	15.9 (60.6)	29.7 (85.5)
Mean daily maximum °C (°F)	−0.3 (31.5)	1.4 (34.5)	4.6 (40.3)	9.6 (49.3)	13.8 (56.8)	18.9 (66.0)	20.4 (68.7)	20.9 (69.6)	16.2 (61.2)	10.8 (51.4)	5.8 (42.4)	1.5 (34.7)	10.3 (50.5)
Daily mean °C (°F)	−3.4 (25.9)	−1.8 (28.8)	1.2 (34.2)	5.6 (42.1)	9.8 (49.6)	14.9 (58.8)	16.4 (61.5)	16.8 (62.2)	12.5 (54.5)	7.3 (45.1)	2.8 (37.0)	−1.2 (29.8)	6.7 (44.1)
Mean daily minimum °C (°F)	−6.5 (20.3)	−4.9 (23.2)	−2.2 (28.0)	1.6 (34.9)	5.9 (42.6)	10.8 (51.4)	12.3 (54.1)	12.8 (55.0)	8.7 (47.7)	3.8 (38.8)	−0.1 (31.8)	−4.0 (24.8)	3.2 (37.7)
Record low °C (°F)	−25.9 (−14.6)	−24.1 (−11.4)	−22.2 (−8.0)	−12.5 (9.5)	−6.0 (21.2)	−3.0 (26.6)	2.5 (36.5)	2.2 (36.0)	−5.7 (21.7)	−10.0 (14.0)	−20.0 (−4.0)	−20.8 (−5.4)	−25.9 (−14.6)
Average precipitation mm (inches)	56.2 (2.21)	43.3 (1.70)	68.8 (2.71)	73.2 (2.88)	118.6 (4.67)	116.2 (4.57)	132.0 (5.20)	81.4 (3.20)	65.6 (2.58)	58.9 (2.32)	61.8 (2.43)	50.2 (1.98)	926.2 (36.45)
Average precipitation days (≥ 1.0 mm)	10.8	8.5	9.8	10.2	13.8	13.0	11.8	8.2	6.7	6.9	9.6	8.8	118.1
Average snowy days	17.9	13.2	12.2	6.7	1.7	0	0	0	0	2.3	7.3	14.2	75.5
Mean monthly sunshine hours	113.5	123.4	147.5	157.9	202.3	224.5	245.3	242.6	199.5	195.3	113.2	80.7	2,045.7
Source: Meteomanz (2014-2026), Culoarul Bran-Rucăr (1961-2006)

== Natives ==
- Gheorghe Bădescu (born 1937), cross-country skier
- Ion Țeposu (born 1943), biathlete

== Gallery ==
Historical population
Year	Pop.	±%
1850	1,629	—
1941	2,284	+40.2%
2002	1,008	−55.9%
2011	852	−15.5%
2021	683	−19.8%
Source: Census data

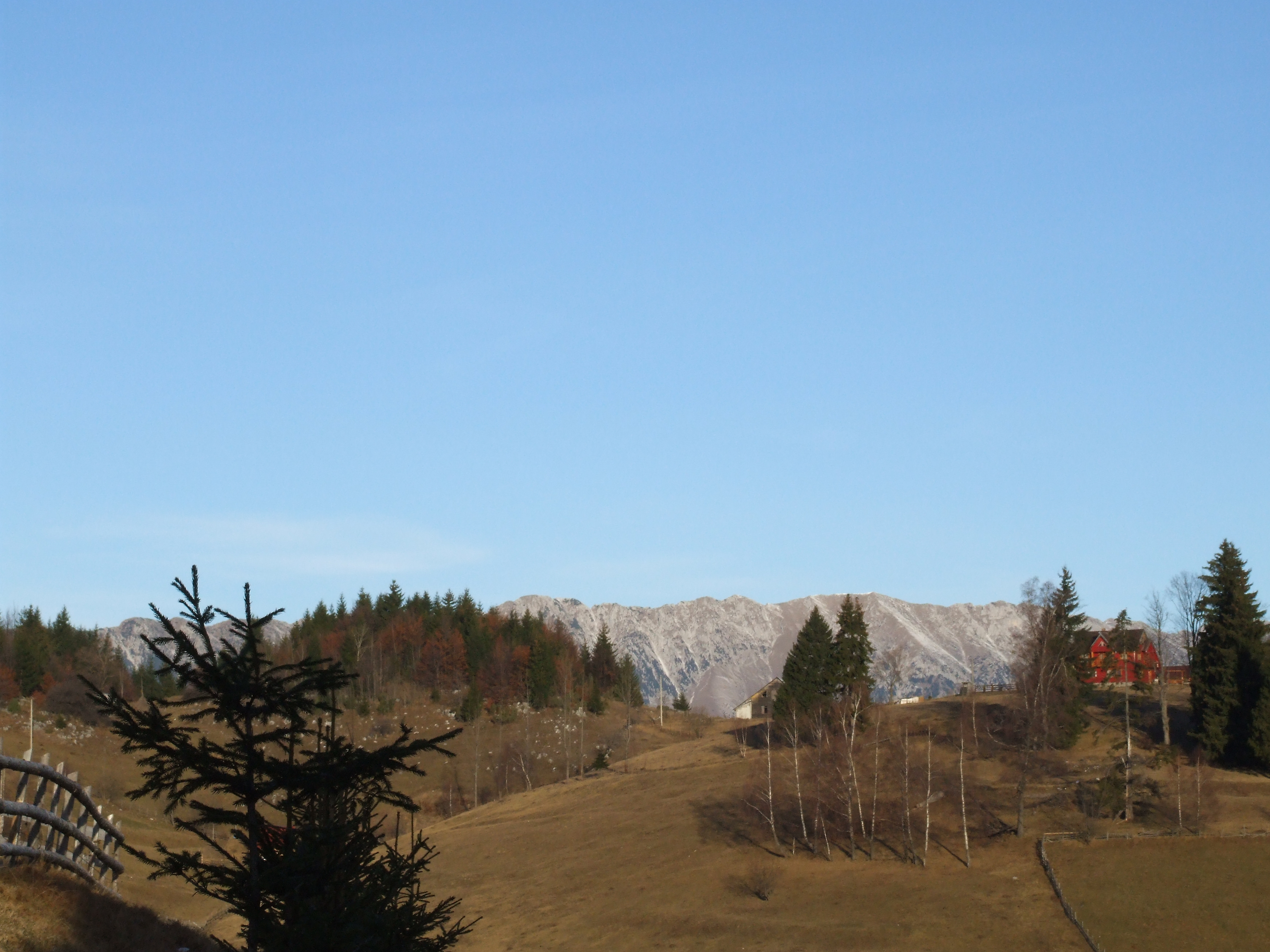
Piatra Craiului Mountains from Fundata

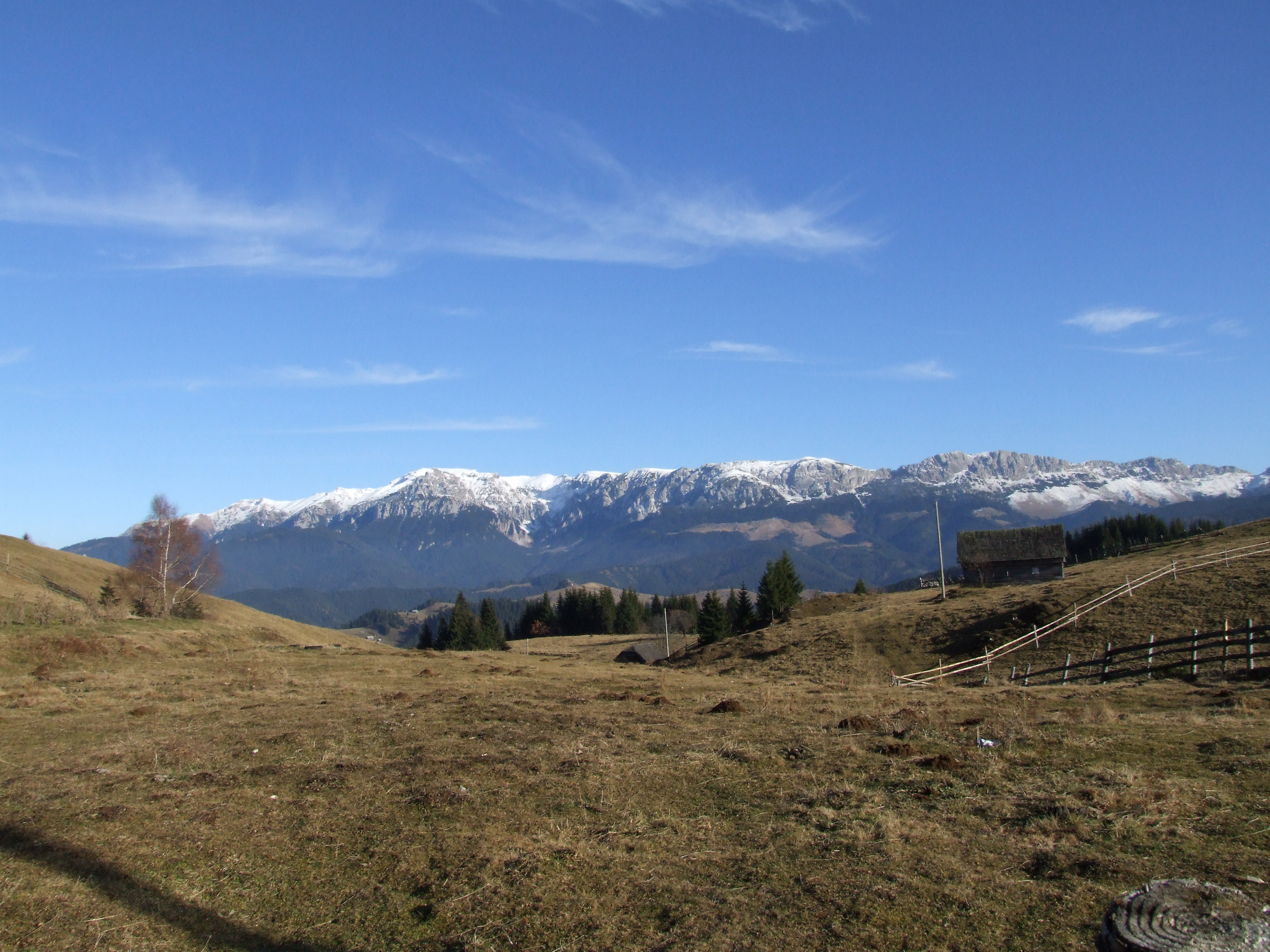
Bucegi Mountains from Fundata

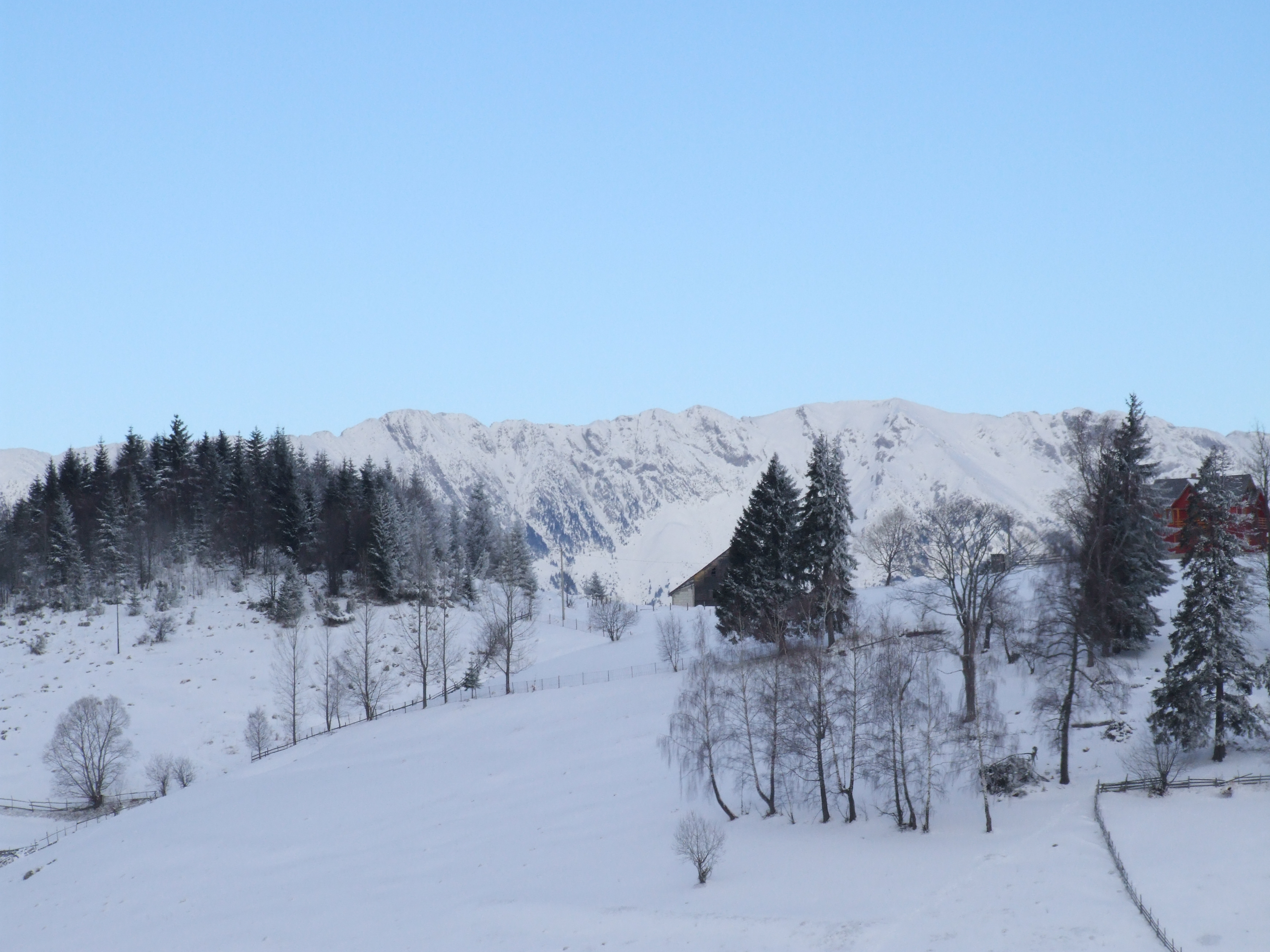
Fundata in winter

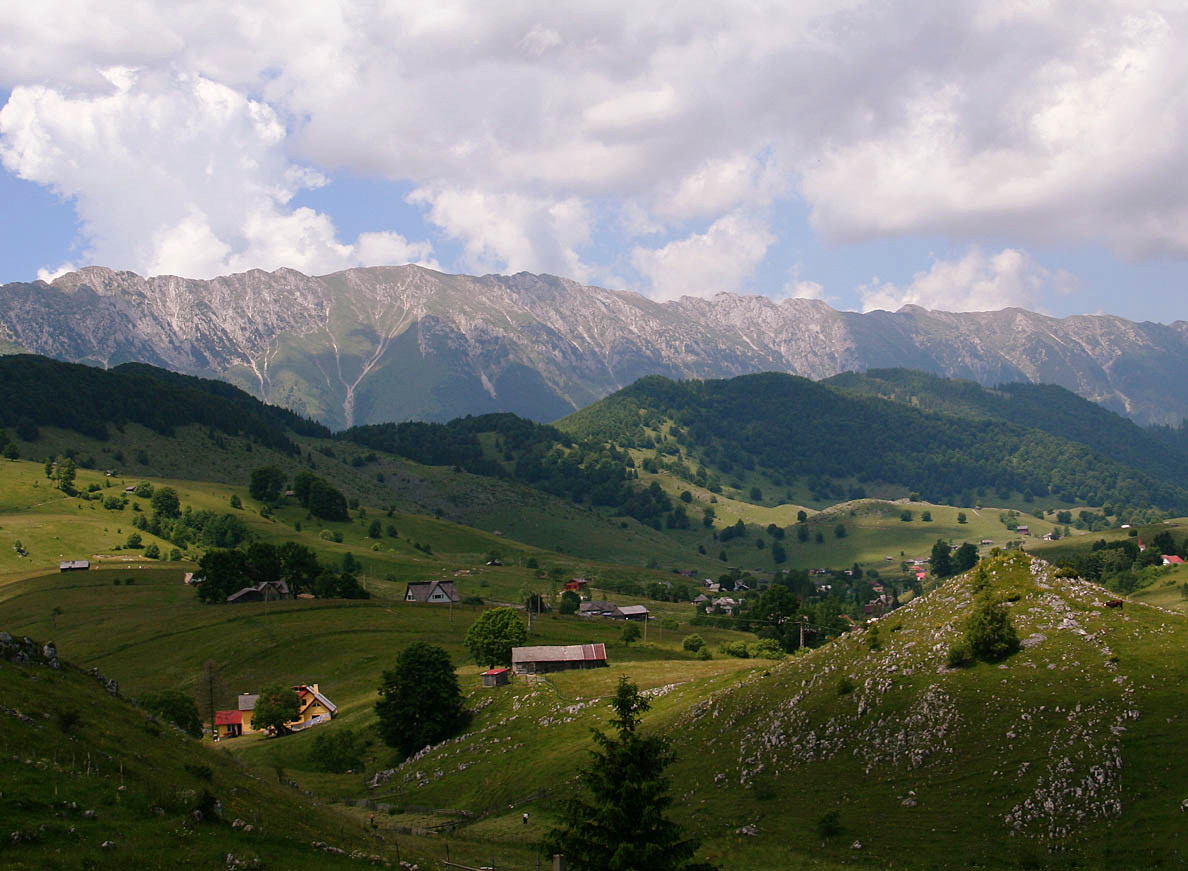
Mountains from Șirnea

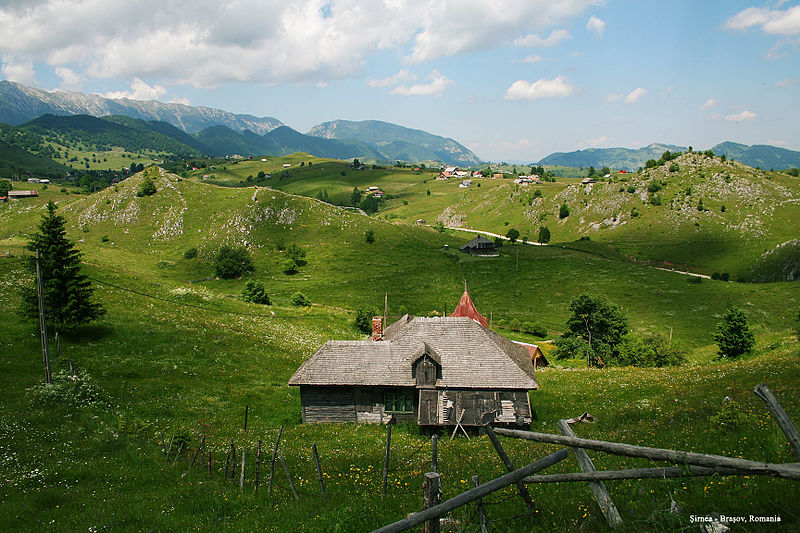
Șirnea landscape

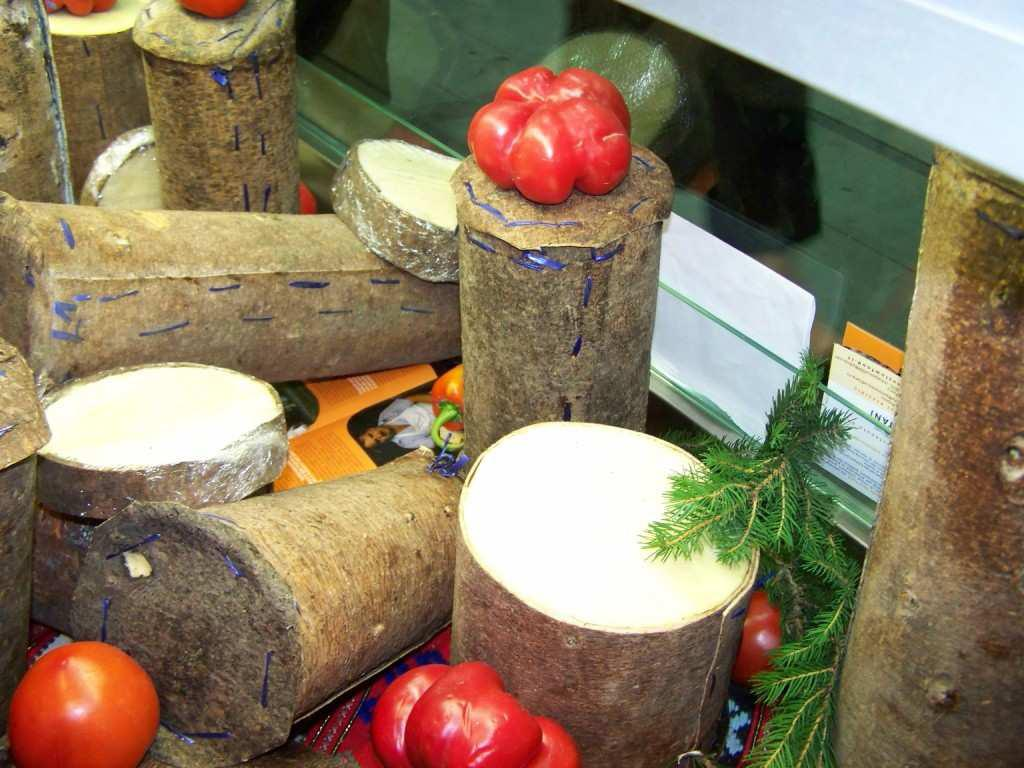
Cheese (brânză de burduf) wrapped in fir bark
