= Paul Chassagne =

French biathlete

Personal information
- Nationality: French
- Born: 18 June 1932 (age 92)

Sport
- Sport: Biathlon

Paul Chassagne (born 18 June 1932) is a French biathlete. He competed in the 20 km individual event at the 1972 Winter Olympics.
