= Akihiko Suzuki =

Japanese bobsledder (born 1945)

Personal information
- Nationality: Japanese
- Born: 8 January 1945 (age 80); Hokkaido, Japan

Sport
- Sport: Bobsleigh

Akihiko Suzuki (鈴木 昭彦, Suzuki Akihiko, born 8 January 1945) is a Japanese bobsledder. He competed in the two-man and the four man events at the 1972 Winter Olympics.
