= Ján Húska =

Slovak biathlete (born 1949)

Personal information
- Nationality: Slovak
- Born: 5 June 1949 (age 75); Važec, Czechoslovakia

Sport
- Sport: Biathlon

Ján Húska (born 5 June 1949) is a Slovak biathlete. He competed in the relay event at the 1972 Winter Olympics.
