= Mario Bacher =

Italian cross-country skier (1941–2014)

Personal information
- Born: September 6, 1941 Formazza, Italy
- Died: July 16, 2014 (aged 72) Verbania, Italy

Sport
- Sport: Skiing

Mario Bacher (September 6, 1941 – July 16, 2014) was an Italian ski mountaineer and cross-country skier.

Bacher was born in Formazza. He participated at the 1968 Winter Olympics, when he placed 12th in the 50 kilometres race of cross-country skiing. Together with Lino Jordan and Franco Ceroni he placed 3rd in the Trofeo Mezzalama ski mountaineering competition.

Further notable results were:

- 1966: 2nd, Italian men's championships of cross-country skiing, 50 km
- 1968: 2nd, Italian men's championships of cross-country skiing, 30 km
