= Ion Țeposu =

Romanian biathlete (born 1943)

Personal information
- Nationality: Romanian
- Born: 24 January 1943 (age 82); Fundata, Brașov County, Kingdom of Romania

Sport
- Sport: Biathlon

Ion Țeposu (born 24 January 1943) is a Romanian biathlete. He competed in the relay event at the 1972 Winter Olympics.
