= Fabrizio Pedranzini =

Italian ski mountaineer and cross-country skier

Personal information
- Born: 14 March 1954 (age 72)

Sport
- Sport: Skiing
Medal record
ski mountaineering
Bronze medal – third place	1975 World Championship (Trofeo Mezzalama)	military team

Fabrizio Pedranzini (born 14 March 1954) is an Italian ski mountaineer and former cross-country skier.

Together with Willy Bertin and Felice Darioli, he placed third in the military team category of the 1975 Trofeo Mezzalama, which was carried out as the first World Championship of Skimountaineering.

He also participated at the 1976 Winter Olympics, when he finished 53rd in the 50 kilometres race of cross-country skiing. At the 1979 Italian men's championships of cross-country skiing he placed third in the 15 km race.
