= Lino Zanon =

Italian biathlete and ski mountaineer

Sport
- Sport: Skiing
- Club: Sci Club Bravi–Masetto

Lino Zanon is an Italian biathlete and ski mountaineer who competed in the 1960s and 1970s. He is currently member of the Sci Club Bravi–Masetto.

== Selected results ==
Zanon also participated in the 20 km event of the Biathlon World Championships 1971, where he placed 48th.

- 1970: 1st, Italian championships of biathlon
- 1971:
  - 1st, Italian championships of biathlon, large calibre
  - 4th, Trofeo Mezzalama, together with Willy Bertin and Felice Darioli
- 1972: 2nd, Italian championships of biathlon
- 1973:
  - 2nd, Italian championships of biathlon
  - 2nd, Trofeo Mezzalama, together with Willy Bertin and Felice Darioli
