= John Evelyn (bobsleigh) =

British bobsledder

Personal information
- Nationality: British
- Born: 16 October 1939; Cheltenham, England
- Died: 6 February 2024 (aged 84)

Sport
- Sport: Bobsleigh

John Evelyn (16 October 1939 – 6 February 2024) was a British bobsledder. He competed in the two-man and the four man events at the 1972 Winter Olympics.
