= Terence Palliser =

British cross-country skier (born 1948)

Personal information
- Nationality: British
- Born: 22 March 1948 (age 77); Basford, Nottingham, England

Sport
- Sport: Cross-country skiing

Terence Palliser (born 22 March 1948) is a British cross-country skier. He competed in the men's 15 kilometre event at the 1972 Winter Olympics.
