= Peter Sears (ice hockey) =

American ice hockey player (born 1947)

Personal information
- Full name: Gordon Peter Sears
- Born: March 14, 1947 (age 79) Lake Placid, New York, U.S.
Medal record
Men's ice hockey
Representing United States
Olympic Games
Silver medal – second place	1972 Sapporo	Team

Gordon Peter "Pete" Sears (born March 14, 1947) is an American retired ice hockey player and educator who played for the American national team. He won a silver medal at the 1972 Winter Olympics.

== Early life and education ==
Sears was born and raised in Lake Placid, New York. He graduated from the State University of New York at Oswego, where he played on the hockey team.

== Career ==
In 1968, Sears tried out for the United States men's national ice hockey team, but the goalie selection had already been completed. Sears was drafted in the United States Army and served two years in 1967–69, including a tour of duty in Vietnam during the Vietnam War.

After graduating from college, Sears tried out for the United States men's national ice hockey team. He was selected as a backup for goaltender for Mike Curran. As a part of the team, he won a silver medal at the 1972 Winter Olympics. Sears played minor league hockey before taking a teaching position at Oswego Middle School. He remained at Oswego Middle School for 33 years, teaching history and working as the assistant and head coach of the school's hockey team.
