= Saint-Rhémy-en-Bosses =

Saint-Rhémy-en-Bosses Sèn Rémi eun Boursa (Valdôtain)
- Comune
- Comune di Saint-Rhémy-en-Bosses; Commune de Saint-Rhémy-en-Bosses
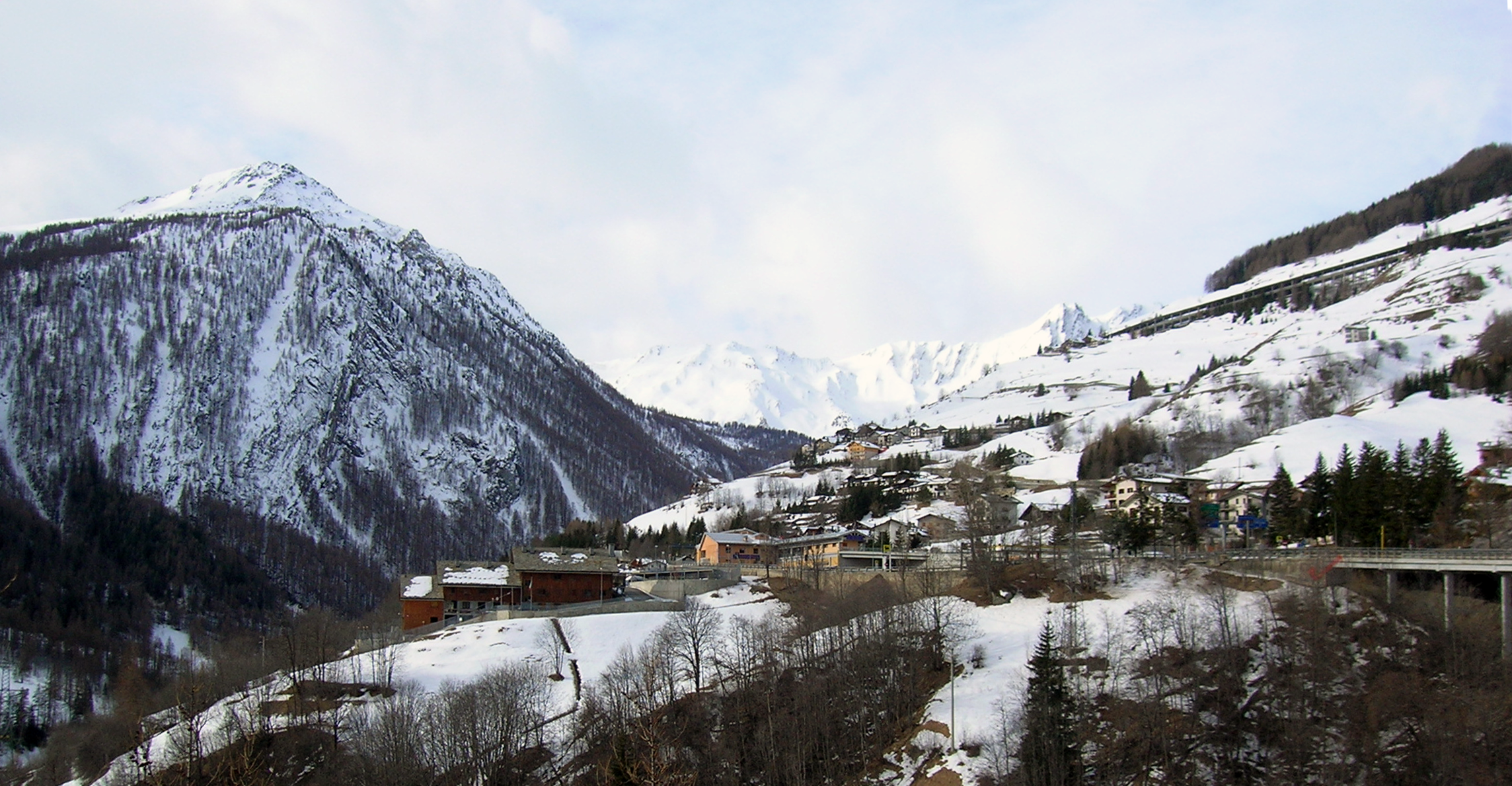
- View of Saint-Léonard

- Coat of arms

- Location within Italy Location within Aosta Valley
- Coordinates: 45°50′N 7°11′E
- Country: Italy
- Region: Aosta Valley
- Frazioni: Cuchepache, Pont-Combaz, Pleiney, Saint-Rhémy, Pra du mas-Farcoz, Pra du mas-Berluc, Saint-Léonard, Suil, Ronc, Cerisey, Mottes, Le Vulpellière, Le Tat, Les Gorres

Government
  - Mayor: Alberto Ciabattoni (Ind.)

Area
  - Total: 64.88 km^{2} (25.05 sq mi)
- Elevation: 1,632 m (5,354 ft)

Population (31 December 2022)
  - Total: 334
  - Density: 5.15/km^{2} (13.3/sq mi)
- Demonym: Saint-rhémiars or Bossoleins
- Time zone: UTC+1 (CET)
  - Summer (DST): UTC+2 (CEST)
- Postal code: 11010
- Dialing code: 0165
- Patron saint: Leonard of Noblac
- Saint day: 6 November
- Website: Official website

Saint-Rhémy-en-Bosses (French: [sɛ̃ ʁemi ɑ̃ bɔs]; Valdôtain: Sèn Rémi eun Boursa) is a comune (municipality) in the Aosta Valley region of Italy.

== Product ==
The PDO recognised ham Valle d'Aosta Jambon de Bosses is produced here.
