= John Hammond (bobsleigh) =

British bobsledder (1932–1994)

Personal information
- Full name: John Maurice Hammond
- Nationality: British
- Born: 4 August 1932; Kingston-upon-Thames, England
- Died: 14 June 1994 (aged 61); Leicester, England

Sport
- Sport: Bobsleigh

John Maurice Hammond (4 August 1932 – 14 June 1994) was a British bobsledder. He competed in the two-man and the four man events at the 1972 Winter Olympics. Hammond died on 14 June 1994, at the age of 61.
