= Everett Dunklee =

American cross-country skier (born 1946)

Personal information
- Born: October 24, 1946 (age 79) Brattleboro, Vermont, United States

Sport
- Sport: Cross-country skiing

Everett Dunklee (born October 24, 1946) is an American cross-country skier. He competed in the men's 15 kilometre event at the 1972 Winter Olympics.
