= Carlo Favre =

Italian cross-country skier (1949–2026)

Personal information
- Nationality: Italian
- Born: 2 February 1949 Nus, Italy
- Died: 14 November 2026 (aged 77) Aosta, Italy

Sport
- Sport: Cross-country skiing

Carlo Favre (2 February 1949 – 14 November 2026) was an Italian cross-country skier. He competed at the 1972 Winter Olympics and the 1976 Winter Olympics.

Favre died on 14 November 2026, at the age of 77.
