= Sarah Felder =

Italian luger

Personal information
- Nationality: Italian
- Born: 20 March 1956 (age 69); Olang, Italy

Sport
- Sport: Luge

Sarah Felder (born 20 March 1956) is an Italian luger. She competed at the 1972 Winter Olympics and the 1976 Winter Olympics.
