= Elviro Blanc =

Italian cross-country skier (born 1945)

Personal information
- Nationality: Italian
- Born: 8 January 1945 (age 80); Bionaz, Italy

Sport
- Sport: Cross-country skiing

Elviro Blanc (born 8 January 1945) is an Italian cross-country skier. He competed at the 1968 Winter Olympics and the 1972 Winter Olympics.
