= Michael Hartley (bobsleigh) =

Canadian bobsledder

Personal information
- Born: 28 November 1946 (age 78); Calgary, Alberta, Canada

Sport
- Sport: Bobsleigh

Michael Hartley (born 28 November 1946) is a Canadian bobsledder. He competed in the two-man event at the 1972 Winter Olympics.
