= Tonio Biondini =

Italian cross-country skier (1945–1983)

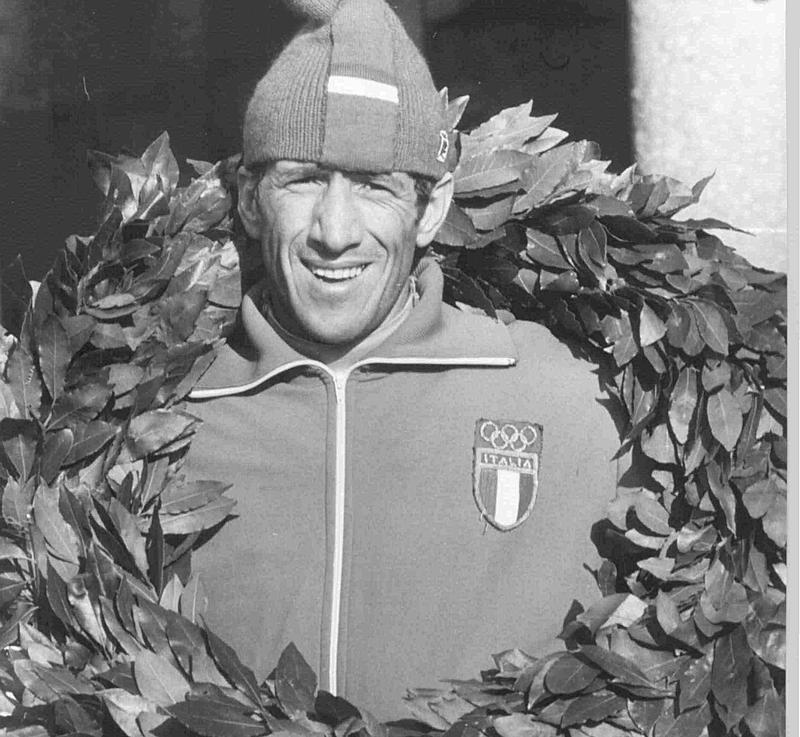
- Tonio Biondini in 1976

Personal information
- Nationality: Italian
- Born: 1 January 1945; Frassinoro, Italy
- Died: 23 June 1983 (aged 38)

Sport
- Sport: Cross-country skiing

Tonio Biondini (1 January 1945 – 23 June 1983) was an Italian cross-country skier. He competed at the 1972 Winter Olympics and the 1976 Winter Olympics.
