= Larry Martin (cross-country skier) =

American cross-country skier (born 1950)

Personal information
- Born: November 29, 1950 (age 75) Glennallen, Alaska, United States

Sport
- Sport: Cross-country skiing

Larry Martin (born November 29, 1950) is an American cross-country skier. He competed in the men's 15 kilometre event at the 1972 Winter Olympics.
