= Mauri Röppänen =

Finnish biathlete and shooter

Medal record

Representing Finland

Men's biathlon

Olympic Games
Silver medal – second place	1972 Sapporo	4 x 7.5 km relay

World Championships
Bronze medal – third place	1969 Zakopane	4 x 7.5 km relay

Mauri Uolevi Röppänen (born 19 January 1946 in Outokumpu, North Karelia) is a Finnish biathlete and Olympic medalist. He received a silver medal at the 1972 Winter Olympics in Sapporo with the Finnish team.
