= Attilio Lombard =

Italian cross-country skier

Personal information
- Nationality: Italian
- Born: 7 June 1944 (age 80); Nus, Italy

Sport
- Sport: Cross-country skiing

Attilio Lombard (born 7 June 1944) is an Italian cross-country skier. He competed in the men's 30 kilometre event at the 1972 Winter Olympics.

He is the uncle of Xavier Chevrier.
