= Barbara Britch =

American cross-country skier (born 1951)

Personal information
- Born: March 30, 1951 (age 74); Anchorage, Alaska, United States

Sport
- Sport: Cross-country skiing

Barbara Britch (born March 30, 1951) is an American cross-country skier. She competed in two events at the 1972 Winter Olympics.
