= Ezio Damolin =

Italian Nordic combined skier and ski jumper (1944–2022)

Ezio Damolin (25 December 1944 – 18 March 2022) was an Italian Nordic combined skier and ski jumper who competed in the 1960s and 1970s. His best finish at the Winter Olympics was fifth in the Nordic combined event at Grenoble in 1968.

He was born in Moena, Italy.

Damolin's finish was the best for Italy in the Olympic Nordic combined event until Alessandro Pittin won bronze in the 10 km individual normal hill event at the 2010 Winter Olympics in Vancouver.

== Further notable results ==
=== Nordic combined ===
- 1964: 2nd, Italian championships of Nordic combined skiing
- 1965: 1st, Italian championships of Nordic combined skiing
- 1966: 1st, Italian championships of Nordic combined skiing
- 1967: 1st, Italian championships of Nordic combined skiing
- 1968: 2nd, Italian championships of Nordic combined skiing
- 1969: 1st, Italian championships of Nordic combined skiing
- 1970: 1st, Italian championships of Nordic combined skiing
- 1971: 2nd, Italian championships of Nordic combined skiing
- 1972: 1st, Italian championships of Nordic combined skiing
- 1973: 1st, Italian championships of Nordic combined skiing
- 1976: 2nd, Italian championships of Nordic combined skiing

=== Ski jumping ===
- 1968: 1st, Italian championships of ski jumping
- 1969: 3rd, Italian championships of ski jumping
- 1971: 2nd, Italian championships of ski jumping
- 1972: 3rd, Italian championships of ski jumping
- 1974: 1st, Italian championships of ski jumping
