= Frances Lütken =

British cross-country skier (born 1950)

Personal information
- Nationality: British
- Born: 2 October 1950 (age 74); Stratford-upon-Avon, England

Sport
- Sport: Cross-country skiing

Frances Lütken (born 2 October 1950) is a British cross-country skier. She competed in two events at the 1972 Winter Olympics.
