= Dick McGlynn =

American ice hockey player

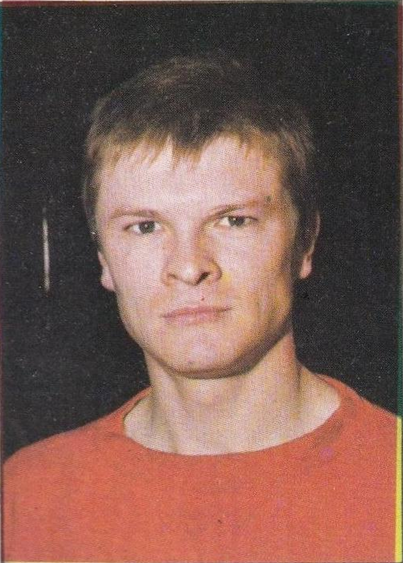
- McGlynn in 1972 card

Personal information
- Full name: Richard Anthony McGlynn
- Born: July 19, 1948 (age 77) Medford, Massachusetts, U.S.
Medal record
Men's ice hockey
Representing United States
Olympic Games
Silver medal – second place	1972 Sapporo	Team

Richard Anthony McGlynn (born July 19, 1948 in Medford, Massachusetts) is a retired professional ice hockey player who played 30 regular season games in the World Hockey Association for the Chicago Cougars in 1972–73. As an amateur, he played for the Colgate University men's hockey team as well as the United States national team at the 1972 Winter Olympics and also the 1971 and 1972 Ice Hockey World Championship tournaments.

== Career statistics ==
=== Regular season and playoffs ===
			Regular season					Playoffs
Season	Team	League	GP	G	A	Pts	PIM	GP	G	A	Pts	PIM
1969–70	Colgate University	ECAC	Statistics Unavailable
1970–71	U.S. National Team	Intl	39	1	6	7	61	—	—	—	—	—
1971–72	U.S. Olympic Team	Intl	50	1	14	15	43	—	—	—	—	—
1972–73	Rhode Island Eagles	EHL	60	2	14	16	36	1	0	0	0	0
1972–73	Chicago Cougars	WHA	30	0	0	0	12	—	—	—	—	—
WHA totals			30	0	0	0	12	—	—	—	—	—
