= Innsbruck Olympics =

Innsbruck Olympics may refer to:

- 1964 Winter Olympics, IX Olympic Winter Games
- 1976 Winter Olympics, XII Olympic Winter Games
- 2012 Winter Youth Olympics, I Winter Youth Olympics
