= Charles Brown (ice hockey) =

American ice hockey player (born 1947)

Personal information
- Full name: Charles Erwin Brown
- Born: October 26, 1947 (age 78) Minneapolis, Minnesota, U.S.
Medal record
Men's ice hockey
Representing United States
Olympic Games
Silver medal – second place	1972 Sapporo	Team

Charles Erwin Brown (born October 26, 1947) is an ice hockey player who played for the American national team. He won a silver medal at the 1972 Winter Olympics.
