= Horst Koschka =

East German biathlete

Medal record

Representing East Germany

Men's biathlon

Olympic Games
Bronze medal – third place	1972 Sapporo	4 x 7.5 km relay

World Championships
Bronze medal – third place	1970 Östersund	4 x 7.5 km relay

Horst Koschka (born 8 September 1943 in Altenberg) is a retired East German biathlete. He represented the sports club Sportvereinigung (SV) Dynamo / SG Dynamo Zinnwald.
