= Josef Niedermeier =

German biathlete

Personal information
- Nationality: German
- Born: 7 November 1942 (age 82); Reit im Winkl, Germany

Sport
- Sport: Biathlon

Josef Niedermeier (born 7 November 1942) is a German biathlete. He competed at the 1972 Winter Olympics and the 1976 Winter Olympics.
