= Margie Mahoney =

American cross-country skier (born 1952)

Personal information
- Born: May 12, 1952 (age 73); Anchorage, Territory of Alaska, United States

Sport
- Sport: Cross-country skiing

Margie Mahoney (born May 12, 1952) is an American cross-country skier. She competed at the 1972 Winter Olympics and the 1976 Winter Olympics.
