= Terry Morse (biathlete) =

American biathlete (born 1946)

Personal information
- Nationality: American
- Born: September 15, 1946 (age 79) Bridgeport, Connecticut, United States

Sport
- Sport: Biathlon

Terry Morse (born September 15, 1946) is an American biathlete. He competed in the 20 km individual event at the 1972 Winter Olympics.
