= Renzo Chiocchetti =

Italian cross-country skier (1945–2020)

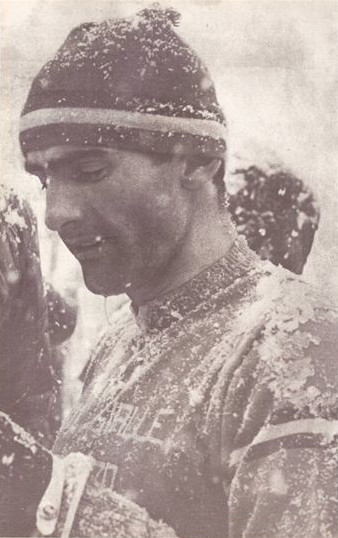
- Renzo Chiocchetti in 1971

Personal information
- Nationality: Italian
- Born: 17 November 1945 Moena, Italy
- Died: 13 February 2020 (aged 74) Moena, Italy

Sport
- Sport: Cross-country skiing

Renzo Chiocchetti (17 November 1945 – 13 February 2020) was an Italian cross-country skier. He competed at the 1972 Winter Olympics and the 1976 Winter Olympics. He was a member of the Ladin ethnic group.

Overall he won nine Italian titles, including the 15km in 1969 and 1975, the 30km in 1975 and 1979, and five different relay races between 1967 and 1980.

During his career he was part of the national team of Italy from 1965 to 1976, and left in a controversial manner after the Innsbruck Olympics. In his relay race he went off first and was far slower then the rest of his teammates. In the end Italy finished 7th, with being 14th of 15 teams after Chiocchetti's opening leg. This disastrous time cost the Italians a podium finish, and possibly Gold.

He quit the sport competitively at the age of 40 to start a successful business career with his wife Giuliana Zeni, running the Hotel Piedibosco at Moena.
