= Obermichelbach =

- Municipality
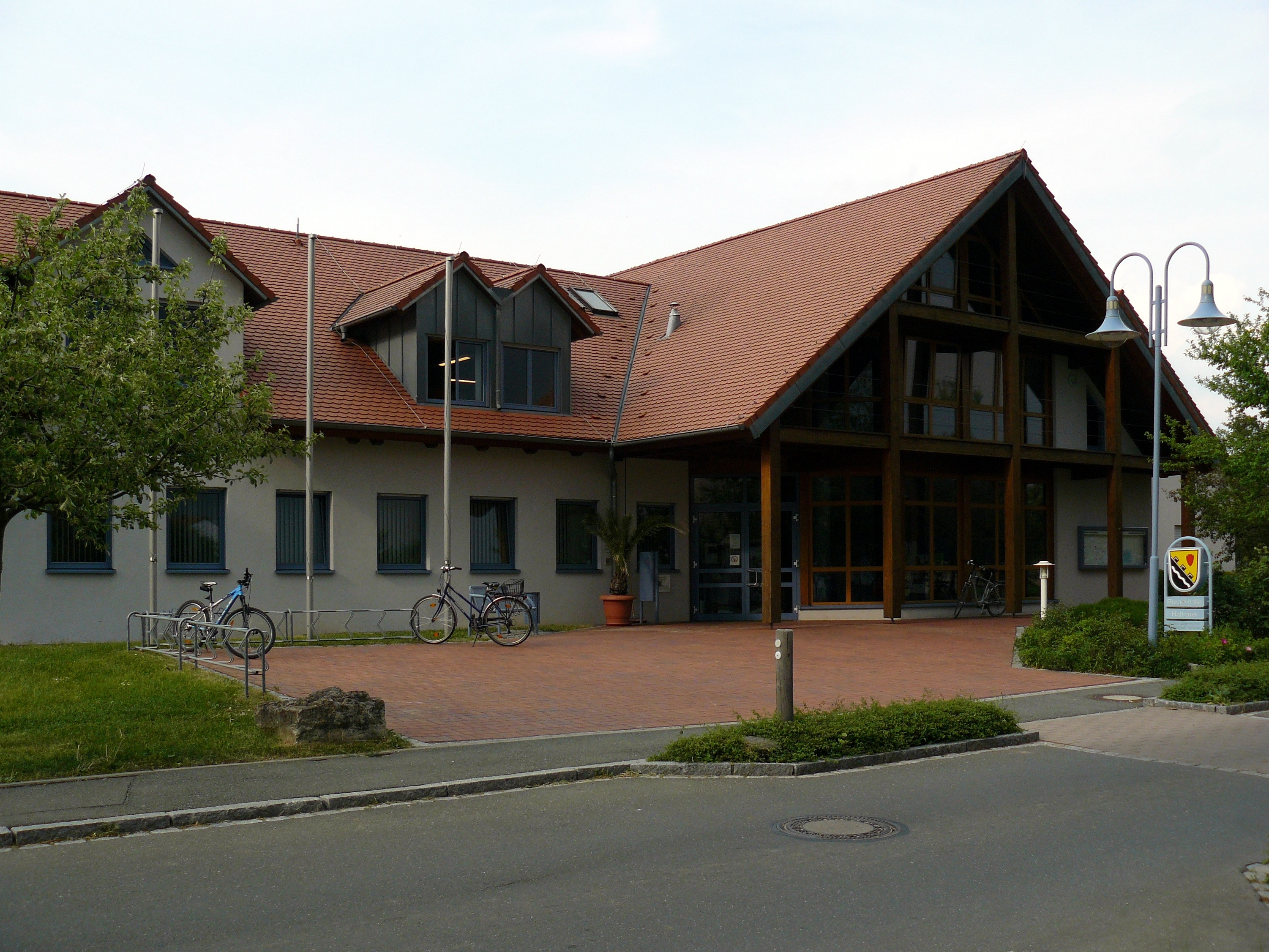
- Town hall

- Coat of arms

- Location of Obermichelbach within Fürth district
- Interactive map of Obermichelbach
- Location within Germany Location within Bavaria
- Coordinates: 49°32′N 10°55′E
- Country: Germany
- State: Bavaria
- Admin. region: Mittelfranken
- District: Fürth
- Municipal assoc.: Obermichelbach-Tuchenbach
- Subdivisions: 3 Ortsteile

Government
  - Mayor (2020–26): Bernd Zimmermann (CSU)

Area
  - Total: 9.28 km^{2} (3.58 sq mi)
- Elevation: 327 m (1,073 ft)

Population (2025-12-31)
  - Total: 3,187
  - Density: 343/km^{2} (889/sq mi)
- Time zone: UTC+01:00 (CET)
  - Summer (DST): UTC+02:00 (CEST)
- Postal codes: 90587
- Dialling codes: 0911
- Vehicle registration: FÜ
- Website: www.obermichelbach.de

Obermichelbach (East Franconian: Michlbach) is a municipality in the district of Fürth in Bavaria in Germany.
