= Peter Clifford (bobsleigh) =

British bobsledder

Personal information
- Nationality: British
- Born: 11 April 1944 (age 80)

Sport
- Sport: Bobsleigh

Peter Clifford (born 11 April 1944) is a British bobsledder. He competed in the two-man and the four man events at the 1972 Winter Olympics.
