= Peter Karns =

American biathlete (born 1945)

Peter Van Karns (born October 24, 1945) is an American biathlete who competed for the United States at the 1972 Winter Olympics where he finished fourteenth, which makes him tied with John Burritt for the best result by an American. In the 1976 Winter Olympics, he was the US biathlon team's head coach.

In 2010, he was inducted into the US Biathlon Hall of Fame.
