= Jay Bowerman (biathlete) =

American biathlete (born 1942)

Personal information
- Born: December 17, 1942 (age 83) Seattle, Washington, United States

Sport
- Sport: Biathlon

Jay Bowerman (born December 17, 1942) is an American biathlete. He competed in the 20 km individual event at the 1972 Winter Olympics.
