= Bill Sweet =

British bobsledder

Personal information
- Full name: William Michael Sweet
- Nationality: British
- Born: 12 April 1947 (age 77); Pontypridd, Wales

Sport
- Sport: Bobsleigh

William Michael Sweet (born 12 April 1947) is a British bobsledder. He competed at the 1972 Winter Olympics and the 1976 Winter Olympics.
