= Thomas Becker (bobsleigh) =

American bobsledder (born 1948)

Personal information
- Nationality: American
- Born: October 26, 1948 (age 77) Indianapolis, Indiana, United States

Sport
- Sport: Bobsleigh

Thomas Becker (born October 26, 1948) is an American bobsledder. He competed at the 1972 Winter Olympics and the 1976 Winter Olympics.
