= Dennis Donahue =

American biathlete (born 1944)

Personal information
- Born: August 22, 1944 (age 81) Miami, Florida, United States

Sport
- Sport: Biathlon

Dennis Donahue (born August 22, 1944) is an American biathlete. He competed at the 1972 Winter Olympics and the 1976 Winter Olympics.
