= Jeffrey Stevens =

British biathlete (born 1945)

Personal information
- Nationality: British
- Born: 26 July 1945 (age 79)

Sport
- Sport: Biathlon

Jeffrey Stevens (born 26 July 1945) is a British biathlete. He competed at the 1972 Winter Olympics and the 1976 Winter Olympics.
