= Isao Ono (biathlete) =

Japanese biathlete (born 1942)

Personal information
- Nationality: Japanese
- Born: 24 April 1942 (age 82); Hokkaido, Japan

Sport
- Sport: Biathlon

Isao Ono (born 24 April 1942) is a Japanese biathlete. He competed at the 1968 Winter Olympics, the 1972 Winter Olympics and the 1976 Winter Olympics.
