= Corrado Varesco =

Italian biathlete

Personal information
- Nationality: Italian
- Born: 18 November 1938 (age 86); Tesero, Italy

Sport
- Sport: Biathlon

Corrado Varesco (born 18 November 1938) is an Italian biathlete. He competed in the relay event at the 1972 Winter Olympics.
