= Keith Oliver (biathlete) =

British biathlete (born 1947)

Personal information
- Nationality: British
- Born: 27 October 1947 (age 77); Liverpool, England

Sport
- Sport: Biathlon, cross-country skiing

Keith Oliver (born 27 October 1947) is a British biathlete. He competed at the 1972 Winter Olympics, the 1976 Winter Olympics and the 1980 Winter Olympics.
