= Giovanni Astegiano =

Italian biathlete (1940–1980)

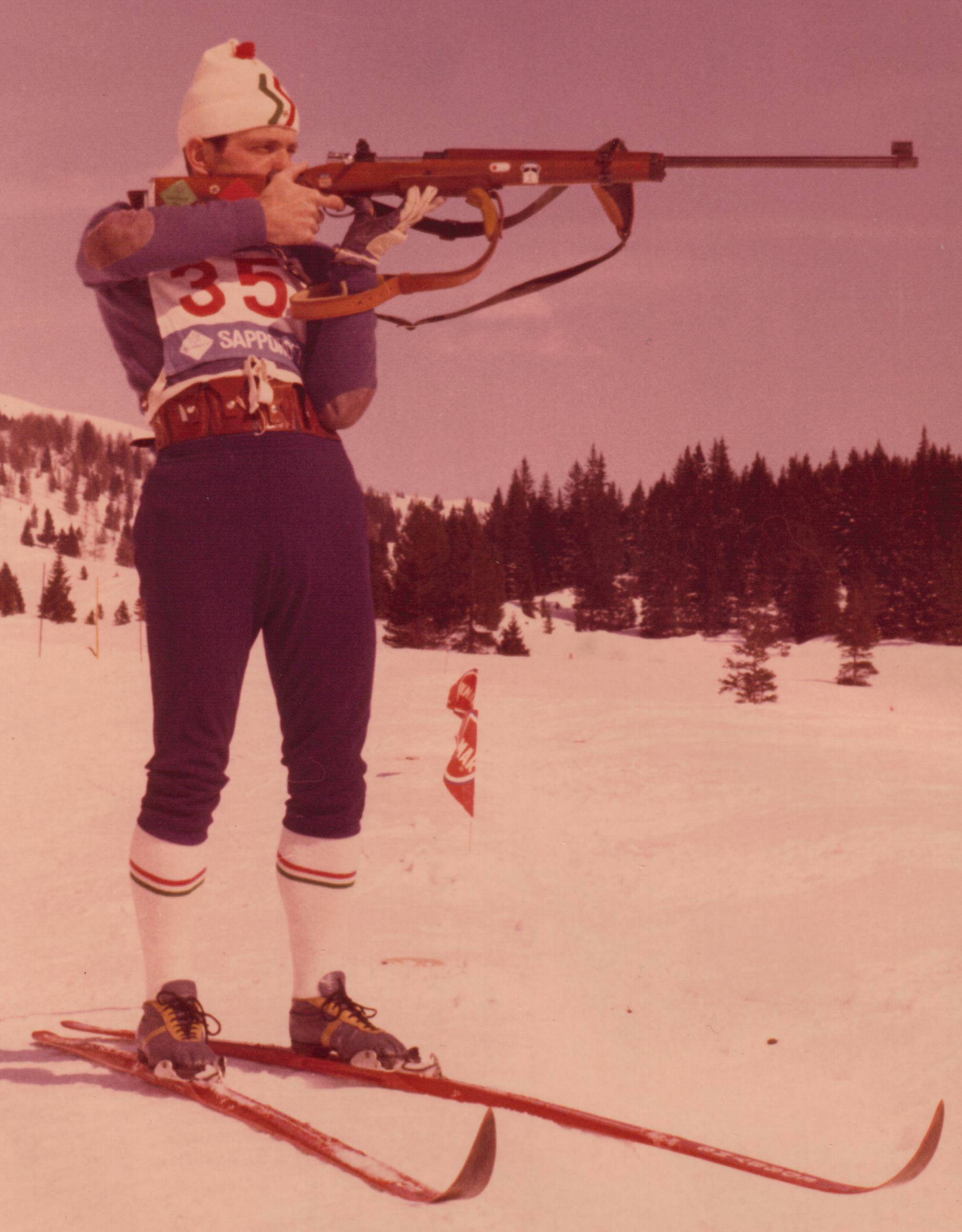

Personal information
- Nationality: Italian
- Born: 26 November 1940; Limone, Italy
- Died: 15 August 1980 (aged 39); Entracque, Italy

Sport
- Sport: Biathlon

Giovanni Astegiano (26 November 1940 – 15 August 1980) was an Italian biathlete. He competed in the 20 km individual event at the 1972 Winter Olympics. He died in an avalanche in 1980.
