= Pierantonio Clementi =

Italian biathlete (born 1947)

Personal information
- Nationality: Italian
- Born: 4 September 1947 (age 77); Schilpario, Italy

Sport
- Sport: Biathlon

Pierantonio Clementi (born 4 September 1947) is an Italian biathlete. He competed at the 1972 Winter Olympics and the 1976 Winter Olympics.
