= Alpine skiing at the 1972 Winter Olympics – Women's giant slalom =

Coordinates: 43.084°N 141.205°E

Women's giant slalom at the XI Olympic Winter Games
- Alpine skiing
- Venue: Teine
- Date: February 8, 1972
- Competitors: 42 from 13 nations
- Winning time: 1:29.90

Medalists
1st place, gold medalist(s)		Marie-Theres Nadig	Switzerland
2nd place, silver medalist(s)		Annemarie Moser-Pröll	Austria
3rd place, bronze medalist(s)		Wiltrud Drexel	Austria

Women's Giant Slalom
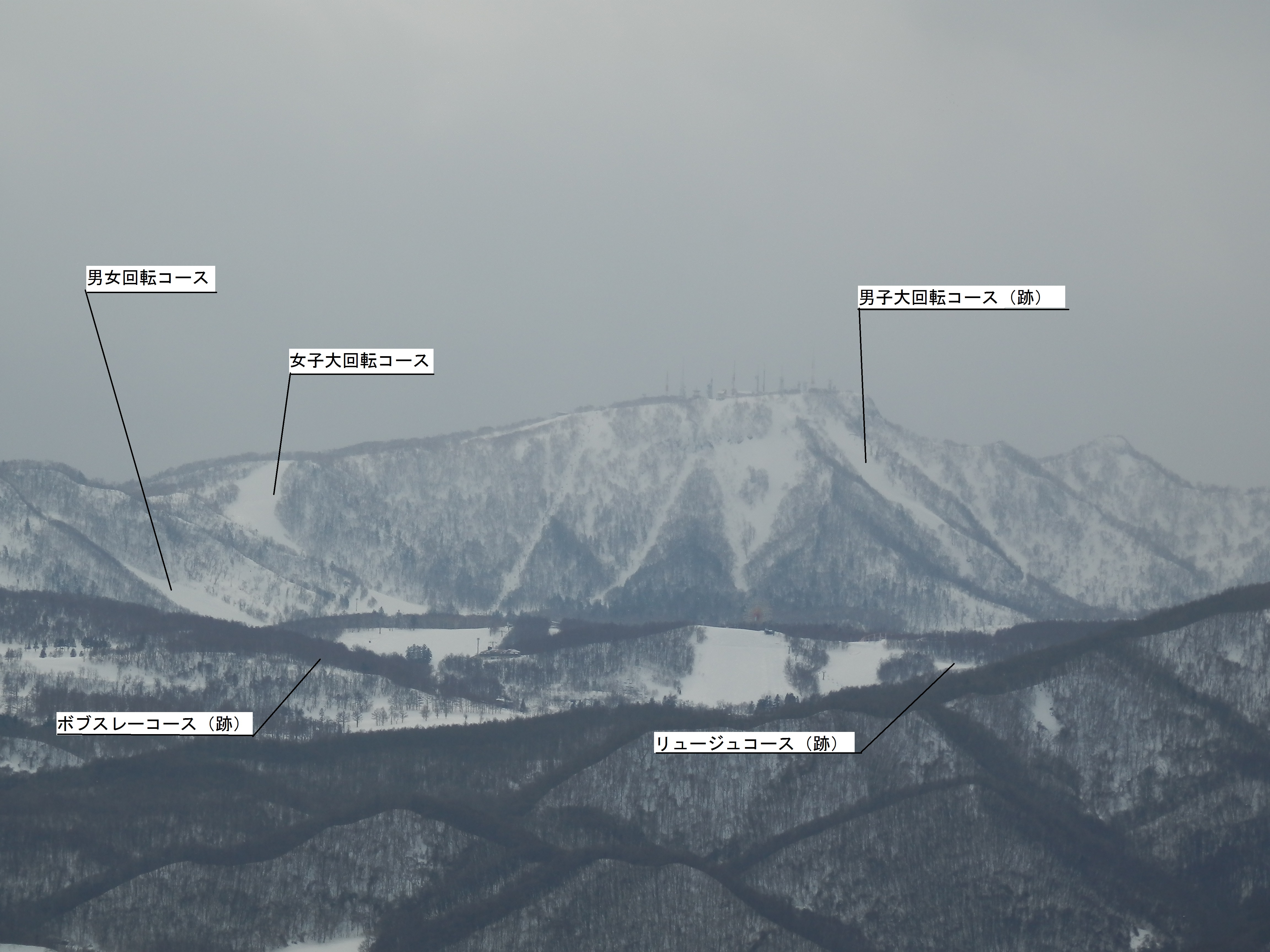
- Interactive map of Women's Giant Slalom
- Location: Teine
- Vertical: 357 m (1,171 ft)
- Top elevation: 982 m (3,222 ft)
- Base elevation: 625 m (2,051 ft)

Locations on Hokkaido

The Women's giant slalom competition of the Sapporo 1972 Olympics was held at Teine on Tuesday, February 8.

The reigning world champion was Betsy Clifford of Canada, while Austria's Annemarie Moser-Pröll was the defending World Cup giant slalom champion and led the current season.

Marie-Theres Nadig of Switzerland, the downhill champion three days earlier, won her second gold medal; Moser-Pröll took another silver, and Austrian compatriot Wiltrud Drexel was the bronze medalist.

== Results ==
The race started at 13:30 JST (UTC+9), and it was snowing. The air temperature was −1 °C (30 °F).

Rank	Bib	Name	Country	Time	Difference
1st place, gold medalist(s)	10	Marie-Theres Nadig	Switzerland	1:29.90	—
2nd place, silver medalist(s)	2	Annemarie Moser-Pröll	Austria	1:30.75	+0.85
3rd place, bronze medalist(s)	1	Wiltrud Drexel	Austria	1:32.35	+2.45
4	26	Laurie Kreiner	Canada	1:32.48	+2.58
5	28	Rosi Speiser	West Germany	1:32.56	+2.66
6	11	Florence Steurer	France	1:32.59	+2.69
7	22	Divina Galica	Great Britain	1:32.72	+2.82
8	8	Britt Lafforgue	France	1:32.80	+2.90
9	23	Traudl Treichl	West Germany	1:33.08	+3.18
10	24	Marta Bühler	Liechtenstein	1:33.15	+3.25
11	3	Barbara Cochran	United States	1:33.16	+3.26
12	9	Rosi Mittermaier	West Germany	1:33.39	+3.49
13	5	Monika Kaserer	Austria	1:33.42	+3.52
14	19	Gina Hathorn	Great Britain	1:33.57	+3.67
15	29	Diane Pratte	Canada	1:33.59	+3.69
16	7	Michèle Jacot	France	1:33.61	+3.71
17	21	Toril Førland	Norway	1:34.15	+4.25
18	34	Bernadette Zurbriggen	Switzerland	1:34.17	+4.27
19	27	Anne Brusletto	Norway	1:34.43	+4.53
20	15	Marilyn Cochran	United States	1:35.27	+5.37
21	13	Isabelle Mir	France	1:35.30	+5.40
22	33	Harue Okitsu	Japan	1:35.33	+5.43
23	12	Karen Budge	United States	1:35.57	+5.67
24	30	Judy Crawford	Canada	1:35.60	+5.70
25	35	Pamela Behr	West Germany	1:35.87	+5.97
26	32	Valentina Iliffe	Great Britain	1:36.68	+6.78
27	16	Karianne Christiansen	Norway	1:37.18	+7.28
28	18	Gyri Sørensen	Norway	1:37.32	+7.42
29	17	Carolyne Oughton	Canada	1:38.29	+8.39
30	37	Miyuki Katagiri	Japan	1:39.11	+9.21
31	40	Svetlana Isakova	Soviet Union	1:40.20	+10.30
32	42	Emiko Okazaki	Japan	1:40.37	+10.47
33	36	Nina Merkulova	Soviet Union	1:41.18	+11.28
34	41	Galina Shikhova	Soviet Union	1:43.74	+13.84
35	39	Carol Blackwood	Great Britain	1:43.96	+14.06
-	14	Gertrud Gabl	Austria	DNF	-
-	20	Lotta Sollander	Sweden	DNF	-
-	31	Silvia Stump	Switzerland	DNF	-
-	4	Sandy Poulsen	United States	DQ	-
-	6	Conchita Puig	Spain	DQ	-
-	25	Rita Good	Switzerland	DQ	-
-	38	Mitsuyo Nagumo	Japan	DQ	-
