= Japan at the 1972 Winter Olympics =

- IOC code: JPN
- NOC: Japanese Olympic Committee
- Website: www.joc.or.jp (in Japanese and English)

in Sapporo
- Competitors: 90 in 10 sports
- Flag bearer: Mineyuki Mashiko
- Medals Ranked 11th: Gold 1 Silver 1 Bronze 1 Total 3

Winter Olympics appearances (overview)
- 1928; 1932; 1936; 1948; 1952; 1956; 1960; 1964; 1968; 1972; 1976; 1980; 1984; 1988; 1992; 1994; 1998; 2002; 2006; 2010; 2014; 2018; 2022; 2026

Japan was the host nation for the 1972 Winter Olympics in Sapporo. It was the first time that Japan had hosted the Winter Olympic Games, but second time overall after the 1964 Summer Olympics in Tokyo. It was also the first Winter Olympic Games held in Asia. The host nation sent 90 athletes, consisting of 70 men and 20 women, along with 20 officers. The flag bearer for the Japanese team, Mineyuki Mashiko did not participate in the game, but instead held the position of team manager.

Three Japanese ski jumpers swept the medals in the normal hill event, becoming national heroes. This achievement also made Yukio Kasaya the first gold medalist for Japan at the Winter Olympic Games. He was also the first ever Asian to win a Winter Olympic gold medal.

== Medalists ==
Medal	Name	Sport	Event	Date
Gold	Yukio Kasaya	Ski jumping	Men's normal hill	February 6
Silver	Akitsugu Konno	Ski jumping	Men's normal hill	February 6
Bronze	Seiji Aochi	Ski jumping	Men's normal hill	February 6

Medals by sport
Sport	1st place, gold medalist(s)	2nd place, silver medalist(s)	3rd place, bronze medalist(s)	Total
Ski jumping	1	1	1	3
Total	1	1	1	3

== Alpine skiing ==
Men

Athlete	Event	Race 1		Race 2		Total	
Athlete	Event	Time	Rank	Time	Rank	Time	Rank
Masahiko Otsue	Downhill					1:59.55	35
Sumihiro Tomii	Downhill					1:55.34	22
Masayoshi Kashiwagi	Giant Slalom	DSQ	–	–	–	DSQ	–
Masahiko Otsue	Giant Slalom	1:38.71	34	DSQ	–	DSQ	–
Haruhisa Chiba	Giant Slalom	1:36.36	26	1:40.87	20	3:17.23	19
Masami Ichimura	Giant Slalom	1:35.77	22	1:39.57	12	3:15.34	15

Men's slalom

Athlete	Classification		Final					
Athlete	Time	Rank	Time 1	Rank	Time 2	Rank	Total	Rank
Haruhisa Chiba	1:43.17	1	1:01.25	29	DNF	–	DNF	–
Toshimasa Furukawa	1:46.33	3	?	25	DSQ	–	DSQ	–
Masayoshi Kashiwagi	DNF	–	1:00.19	24	56.42	17	1:56.61	18
Masami Ichimura	1:42.90	1	57.58	13	57.25	18	1:54.83	17

Women

Athlete	Event	Race 1		Race 2		Total	
Athlete	Event	Time	Rank	Time	Rank	Time	Rank
Emiko Okazaki	Downhill					1:48.85	41
Harue Okitsu	Downhill					1:45.37	40
Miyuki Katagiri	Downhill					1:44.10	35
Mitsuyo Nagumo	Downhill					1:43.07	32
Mitsuyo Nagumo	Giant Slalom					DSQ	–
Emiko Okazaki	Giant Slalom					1:40.37	32
Miyuki Katagiri	Giant Slalom					1:39.11	30
Harue Okitsu	Giant Slalom					1:35.33	22
Miyuki Katagiri	Slalom	DNF	–	–	–	DNF	–
Mitsuyo Nagumo	Slalom	DNF	–	–	–	DNF	–
Harue Okitsu	Slalom	50.55	19	50.12	16	1:40.67	16
Emiko Okazaki	Slalom	50.06	18	49.47	14	1:39.53	13

== Biathlon ==
Men

Event	Athlete	Time	Penalties	Adjusted time ^{1}	Rank
20 km	Kazuo Sasakubo	1'19:07.43	9	1'28:07.43	38
20 km	Isao Ono	1'16:26.83	7	1'23:26.83	25
20 km	Shozo Sasaki	1'18:05.54	5	1'23:05.54	23
20 km	Miki Shibuya	1'16:57.27	5	1'21:57.27	17

^{1} One minute added per close miss (a hit in the outer ring), two minutes added per complete miss.

Men's 4 x 7.5 km relay

Athletes	Race		
Athletes	Misses ^{2}	Time	Rank
Isao Ono; Shozo Sasaki; Miki Shibuya; Kazuo Sasakubo	5	1'59:09.48	8

^{2} A penalty loop of 200 metres had to be skied per missed target.

== Bobsleigh ==
Sled	Athletes	Event	Run 1		Run 2		Run 3		Run 4		Total	
Sled	Athletes	Event	Time	Rank	Time	Rank	Time	Rank	Time	Rank	Time	Rank
JPN-1	Susumu Esashika; Kazumi Abe	Two-man	1:18.13	16	1:16.43	6	1:15.17	14	1:16.86	18	5:06.59	15
JPN-2	Akihiko Suzuki; Rikio Sato	Two-man	1:18.98	21	1:18.46	21	1:15.63	16	1:18.84	21	5:11.91	21

Sled	Athletes	Event	Run 1		Run 2		Run 3		Run 4		Total	
Sled	Athletes	Event	Time	Rank	Time	Rank	Time	Rank	Time	Rank	Time	Rank
JPN-1	Susumu Esashika; Kazumi Abe; Rikio Sato; Yoshiyuki Ichihashi	Four-man	1:11.51	6	1:12.99	15	1:11.42	12	1:12.00	13	4:47.92	12
JPN-2	Toshihisa Nagata; Hiroshi Inaba; Koichi Sugawara; Akihiko Suzuki	Four-man	1:11.51	6	1:12.99	15	DSQ	–	–	–	DSQ	–

== Cross-country skiing ==
Men

Event	Athlete	Race	
Event	Athlete	Time	Rank
15 km	Motoharu Matsumura	50:43.76	51
15 km	Akiyoshi Matsuoka	49:50.72	43
15 km	Kunio Shibata	49:38.95	41
15 km	Hideo Tanifuji	49:06.97	37
30 km	Tomio Okamura	1'47:50.22	47
30 km	Seiji Kudo	1'47:00.40	44
30 km	Hideo Tanifuji	1'45:37.13	37
30 km	Kunio Shibata	1'42:30.83	23
50 km	Motoharu Matsumura	DNF	–
50 km	Seiji Kudo	2'57:42.62	29

Men's 4 × 10 km relay

Athletes	Race	
Athletes	Time	Rank
Hideo Tanifuji; Kunio Shibata; Akiyoshi Matsuoka; Tomio Okamura	2'13:59.14	10

Women

Event	Athlete	Race	
Event	Athlete	Time	Rank
5 km	Akiko Akasaka	19:49.74	43
5 km	Harumi Imai	19:05.73	38
5 km	Tokiko Ozeki	19:00.82	37
5 km	Hiroko Takahashi	18:32.75	34
10 km	Hideko Saito	39:51.61	38
10 km	Harumi Imai	39:33.13	37
10 km	Tokiko Ozeki	38:07.24	33
10 km	Hiroko Takahashi	36:53.84	25

Women's 3 × 5 km relay

Athletes	Race	
Athletes	Time	Rank
Tokiko Ozeki; Hiroko Takahashi; Hideko Saito	53:20.75	9

== Figure skating ==
Men

Athlete	CF	FS	Points	Places	Rank
Yutaka Higuchi	16	15	2309.7	140	16

Women

Athlete	CF	FS	Points	Places	Rank
Kazumi Yamashita	10	10	2449.9	93	10

Pairs

Athletes	SP	FS	Points	Places	Rank
Kotoe Nagasawa; Hiroshi Nagakubo	16	16	345.5	144	16

== Ice hockey ==
=== First round ===
Winners (in bold) entered the Medal Round. Other teams played a consolation round for 7th-11th places.

Team 1	Score	Team 2
Japan	2–8	**Czechoslovakia**

=== Consolation round ===
Rank	Team	Pld	W	L	T	GF	GA	Pts
**7**	West Germany	4	3	1	0	22	10	**6**
**8**	Norway	4	3	1	0	16	14	**6**
**9**	Japan	4	2	1	1	17	16	**5**
**10**	Switzerland	4	0	2	2	9	16	**2**
**11**	(Socialist Federal Republic of Yugoslavia) Yugoslavia	4	0	3	1	9	17	**1**

- Japan 3-3 Switzerland
- Japan 3-2 Yugoslavia
- Japan 4-5 Norway
- Japan 7-6 West Germany

**Contestants**; Toshimitsu Otsubo; Tsutomu Hanzawa; Minoru Misawa; Hiroshi Hori; Iwao Nakayama; Takeshi Akiba; Fumio Yamazaki; Takashi Tsuburai; Minoru Ito; Teruyasu Honma; Yasushio Tanaka; Hideaki Kurokawa; Takao Hikigi; Koji Iwamoto; Isao Kakihara; Toru Okajima; Yoshio Hoshino; Osamu Wakabayashi; Hideo Suzuki

== Luge ==
Men

Athlete	Run 1		Run 2		Run 3		Run 4		Total	
Athlete	Time	Rank	Time	Rank	Time	Rank	Time	Rank	Time	Rank
Masatoshi Kobayashi	55.30	32	54.43	25	53.00	19	53.66	27	3:36.39	24
Satoru Arai	54.76	26	55.07	30	53.75	25	53.73	29	3:37.31	26
Masako Eguchi	54.09	15	53.37	12	52.78	18	53.57	25	3:33.81	18
Kazuaki Ichikawa	54.09	15	54.21	22	53.29	22	53.40	22	3:34.99	20

(Men's) Doubles

Athletes	Run 1		Run 2		Total	
Athletes	Time	Rank	Time	Rank	Time	Rank
Satoru Arai; Masatoshi Kobayashi	44.73	4	44.90	7	1:29.63	4
Masako Eguchi; Kazuaki Ichikawa	46.93	19	46.63	18	1:33.56	18

Women

Athlete	Run 1		Run 2		Run 3		Run 4		Total	
Athlete	Time	Rank	Time	Rank	Time	Rank	Time	Rank	Time	Rank
Miyako Kawase	47.93	20	47.31	19	46.72	18	46.14	18	3:08.10	19
Hiroko Shibuya	46.66	14	46.41	13	45.89	8	45.49	12	3:04.45	13
Yuko Otaka	45.21	4	45.65	5	45.39	5	44.73	5	3:00.98	5

== Nordic combined ==
Events:

- normal hill ski jumping (Three jumps, best two counted and shown here.)
- 15 km cross-country skiing

Athlete	Event	Ski Jumping				Cross-country			Total	
Athlete	Event	Distance 1	Distance 2	Points	Rank	Time	Points	Rank	Points	Rank
Nobutaka Sasaki	Individual	72.5	76.0	190.3	8	54:00.6	169.645	37	359.945	24
Hideki Nakano	Individual	82.0	81.0	220.5	1	55:41.2	154.555	39	375.055	13
Yuji Katsuro	Individual	74.5	78.0	195.1	6	51:10.9	195.100	18	390.200	5
Kazuo Araya	Individual	76.5	77.0	199.7	5	53:29.3	174.340	34	374.040	15

== Ski jumping ==
Athlete	Event	Jump 1		Jump 2		Total	
Athlete	Event	Distance	Points	Distance	Points	Points	Rank
Takashi Fujisawa	Normal hill	81.0	117.8	68.0	90.0	207.8	23
**Akitsugu Konno**	Normal hill	82.5	120.2	79.0	114.6	234.8	2nd place, silver medalist(s)
**Seiji Aochi**	Normal hill	83.5	123.3	77.5	106.2	229.5	3rd place, bronze medalist(s)
**Yukio Kasaya**	Normal hill	84.0	126.6	79.0	117.6	244.2	1st place, gold medalist(s)
Hiroshi Itagaki	Large hill	90.0	96.0	84.0	87.1	183.1	19
Takashi Fujisawa	Large hill	95.5	107.2	86.0	89.9	197.1	14
Akitsugu Konno	Large hill	98.0	109.7	88.5	89.4	199.1	12
Yukio Kasaya	Large hill	106.0	124.9	85.0	84.5	209.4	7

== Speed skating ==
Men

Event	Athlete	Race	
Event	Athlete	Time	Rank
500 m	Keiichi Suzuki	41.28	19
500 m	Norio Hirate	41.08	17
500 m	Takayuki Hida	40.62	13
500 m	Masaki Suzuki	40.35	8
1500 m	Kiyomi Ito	2:11.96	22
1500 m	Mutsuhiko Maeda	2:11.09	20
5000 m	Osamu Naito	7:56.97	16
5000 m	Kiyomi Ito	7:45.96	13
10,000 m	Osamu Naito	15:52.93	12
10,000 m	Kiyomi Ito	15:48.17	10

Women

Event	Athlete	Race	
Event	Athlete	Time	Rank
500 m	Ryoko Onozawa	46.70	21
500 m	Sachiko Saito	45.35	9
1000 m	Ryoko Onozawa	1:36.99	28
1000 m	Sachiko Saito	1:35.12	18
1000 m	Emiko Taguchi	1:34.40	15
1500 m	Kaname Ide	2:28.34	18
1500 m	Emiko Taguchi	2:28.19	17
1500 m	Satomi Koike	2:25.16	11
3000 m	Akiko Aruga	5:22.60	18
3000 m	Kaname Ide	5:17.30	16
3000 m	Satomi Koike	5:09.21	12
