= Alpine skiing at the 1972 Winter Olympics – Women's slalom =

Women's slalom at the XI Olympic Winter Games
- Alpine skiing
- Venue: Teine; Hokkaido, Japan
- Date: February 11, 1972
- Competitors: 42 from 13 nations
- Winning time: 3:09.62

Medalists
1st place, gold medalist(s)		Barbara Cochran	United States
2nd place, silver medalist(s)		Danièle Debernard	France
3rd place, bronze medalist(s)		Florence Steurer	France

Women's Slalom
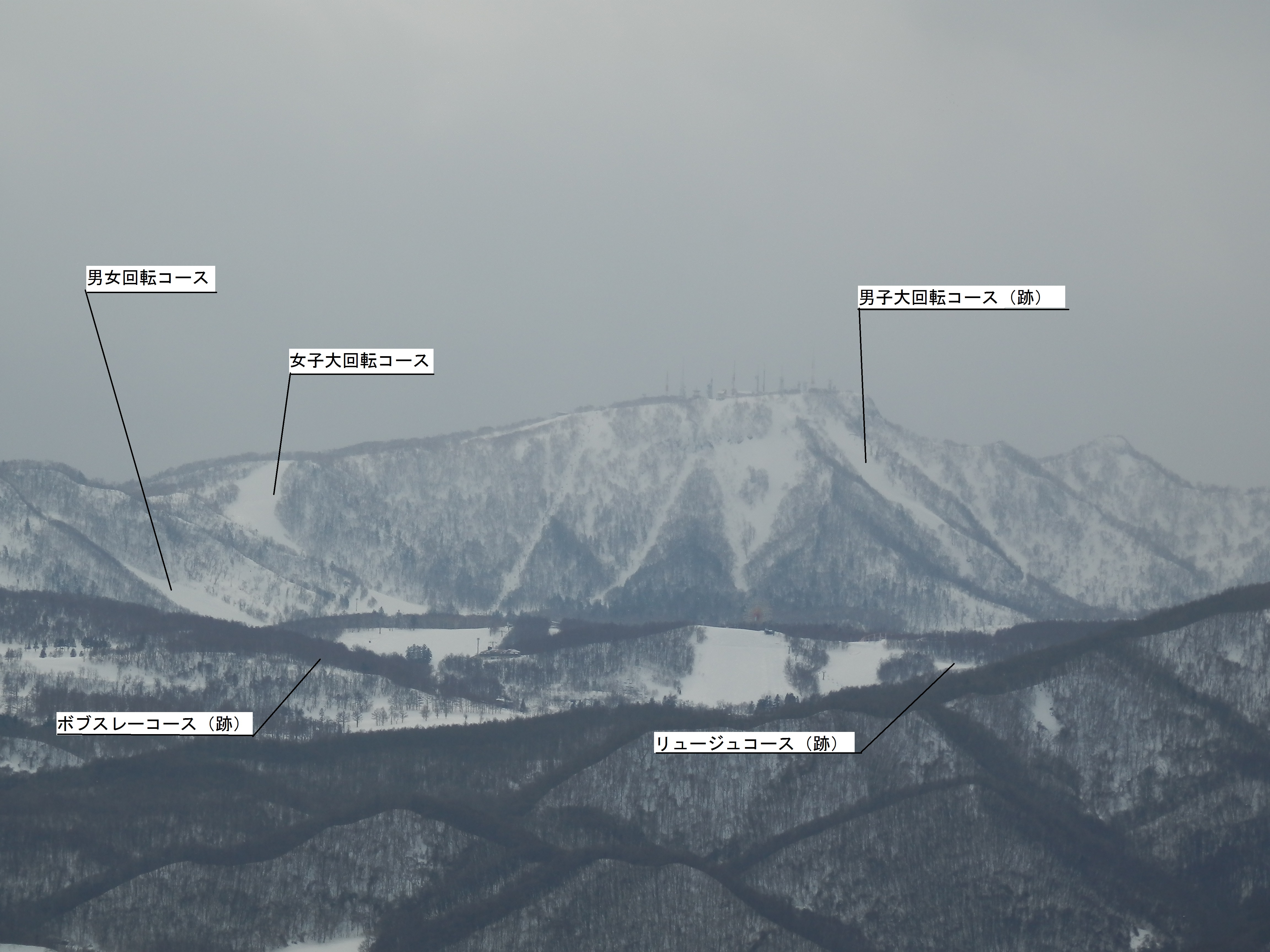
- Location: Teine
- Vertical: 184 m (604 ft)
- Top elevation: 751 m (2,464 ft)
- Base elevation: 567 m (1,860 ft)

Locations on Hokkaido

The Women's slalom competition of the 1972 Winter Olympics at Sapporo, Japan, was held at Teine on Friday, February 11.

The defending world champion was Ingrid Lafforgue of France, while her sister Britt Lafforgue was the defending World Cup downhill champion and France's Françoise Macchi led the 1972 World Cup.

Barbara Cochran was the winner, edging Danièle Debernard by a scant two hundredths of a second; the two had the fastest times in both runs and were well ahead of the field. It was the first gold medal for the United States in alpine skiing in twenty years.

== Results ==
Rank	Name	Country	Run 1	Run 2	Total	Difference
1st place, gold medalist(s)	Barbara Cochran	United States	0:46.05	0:45.19	1:31.24	—
2nd place, silver medalist(s)	Danièle Debernard	France	0:46.08	0:45.18	1:31.26	+0.02
3rd place, bronze medalist(s)	Florence Steurer	France	0:46.57	0:46.12	1:32.69	+1.45
4	Judy Crawford	Canada	0:47.12	0:46.83	1:33.95	+2.71
5	Annemarie Moser-Pröll	Austria	0:47.20	0:46.83	1:34.03	+2.79
6	Pamela Behr	West Germany	0:47.57	0:46.70	1:34.27	+3.03
7	Monika Kaserer	Austria	0:47.59	0:46.77	1:34.36	+3.12
8	Patty Boydstun	United States	0:48.11	0:47.48	1:35.59	+4.35
9	Susan Corrock	United States	0:48.09	0:47.67	1:35.76	+4.52
9	Toril Førland	Norway	0:47.75	0:48.01	1:35.76	+4.52
11	Gina Hathorn	Great Britain	0:48.72	0:47.46	1:36.18	+4.94
12	Laurie Kreiner	Canada	0:48.81	0:48.49	1:37.30	+6.06
13	Emiko Okazaki	Japan	0:50.06	0:49.47	1:39.53	+8.29
14	Kathy Kreiner	Canada	0:50.55	0:49.72	1:40.27	+9.03
15	Divina Galica	Great Britain	0:51.13	0:49.37	1:40.50	+9.26
16	Harue Okitsu	Japan	0:50.55	0:50.12	1:40.67	+9.43
17	Rosi Mittermaier	West Germany	0:47.27	0:53.90	1:41.17	+9.93
18	Marta Bühler	Liechtenstein	0:50.65	0:51.04	1:41.69	+10.45
19	Galina Shikhova	Soviet Union	0:52.07	0:54.00	1:46.07	+14.83
-	Britt Lafforgue	France	0:46.23	DQ	-	-
-	Gertrud Gabl	Austria	0:47.80	DNF	-	-
-	Silvia Stump	Switzerland	0:49.19	DNF	-	-
-	Diane Pratte	Canada	0:49.32	DNF	-	-
-	Karianne Christiansen	Norway	0:52.59	DNF	-	-
-	Wiltrud Drexel	Austria	DNF	-	-	-
-	Conchita Puig	Spain	DNF	-	-	-
-	Marie-Theres Nadig	Switzerland	DNF	-	-	-
-	Traudl Treichl	West Germany	DNF	-	-	-
-	Anne Brusletto	Norway	DNF	-	-	-
-	Rosi Speiser	West Germany	DNF	-	-	-
-	Bernadette Zurbriggen	Switzerland	DNF	-	-	-
-	Lotta Sollander	Sweden	DNF	-	-	-
-	Rita Good	Switzerland	DNF	-	-	-
-	Valentina Iliffe	Great Britain	DNF	-	-	-
-	Carol Blackwood	Great Britain	DNF	-	-	-
-	Mitsuyo Nagumo	Japan	DNF	-	-	-
-	Svetlana Isakova	Soviet Union	DNF	-	-	-
-	Miyuki Katagiri	Japan	DNF	-	-	-
-	Michèle Jacot	France	DQ	-	-	-
-	Marilyn Cochran	United States	DQ	-	-	-
-	Gyri Sørensen	Norway	DQ	-	-	-
-	Nina Merkulova	Soviet Union	DQ	-	-	-
