= Alpine skiing at the 1972 Winter Olympics – Women's downhill =

Women's Downhill at the XI Olympic Winter Games
- Alpine skiing
- Venue: Mount Eniwa
- Date: February 5
- Competitors: 41 from 15 nations
- Winning time: 1:36.68

Medalists
| 1st place, gold medalist(s) | | Marie-Theres Nadig | Switzerland |
| 2nd place, silver medalist(s) | | Annemarie Moser-Pröll | Austria |
| 3rd place, bronze medalist(s) | | Susie Corrock | United States |

Women's Downhill
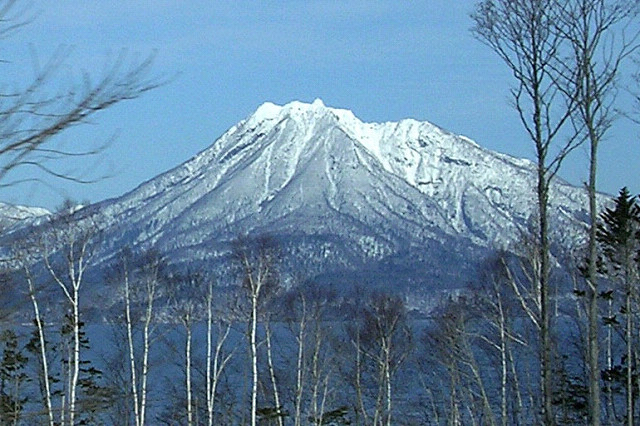
- Location: Mount Eniwa
- Vertical: 534 m (1,752 ft)
- Top elevation: 870 m (2,854 ft)
- Base elevation: 336 m (1,102 ft)

Locations on Hokkaido

The Women's downhill competition of the Sapporo 1972 Olympics was held at Mount Eniwa on Saturday, February 5.

The defending world champion was Annerosli Zryd of Switzerland, while Austria's Annemarie Moser-Pröll was the defending World Cup downhill champion and led the current season. Defending Olympic champion Olga Pall retired from competition two years earlier.

Marie-Theres Nadig of Switzerland won the gold medal, Moser-Pröll took the silver, and American Susan Corrock was the bronze medalist.

The starting gate was at an elevation of 870 m (2,854 ft) above sea level, with a vertical drop of 534 m (1,752 ft). The course length was 2.108 km (1.31 mi) and Nadig's winning run of 96.68 seconds resulted in an average speed of 78.494 km/h (48.8 mph), with an average vertical descent rate of 5.523 m/s (18.1 ft/s).

== Results ==
Saturday, February 5, 1972
The race was started at 13:30 local time, (UTC+9). At the starting gate, the skies were fair, the air temperature was −7.0 °C (19.4 °F), snow temperature was −8.0 °C (17.6 °F), and wind speed was 1.0 m/s (2.2 mph).

| Rank | Bib | Name | Country | Time | Difference |
|---|---|---|---|---|---|
| 1st place, gold medalist(s) | 13 | Marie-Theres Nadig | Switzerland | 1:36.68 | — |
| 2nd place, silver medalist(s) | 15 | Annemarie Moser-Pröll | Austria | 1:37.00 | +0.32 |
| 3rd place, bronze medalist(s) | 10 | Susan Corrock | United States | 1:37.68 | +1.00 |
| 4 | 8 | Isabelle Mir | France | 1:38.62 | +1.94 |
| 5 | 18 | Rosi Speiser | West Germany | 1:39.10 | +2.42 |
| 6 | 11 | Rosi Mittermaier | West Germany | 1:39.32 | +2.64 |
| 7 | 21 | Bernadette Zurbriggen | Switzerland | 1:39.49 | +2.81 |
| 8 | 9 | Annie Famose | France | 1:39.70 | +3.02 |
| 9 | 2 | Bernadette Rauter | Austria | 1:39.84 | +3.16 |
| 10 | 30 | Marta Bühler | Liechtenstein | 1:40.06 | +3.38 |
| 11 | 35 | Toril Førland | Norway | 1:40.25 | +3.57 |
| 12 | 20 | Marianne Hefti | Switzerland | 1:40.38 | +3.70 |
| 13 | 22 | Traudl Treichl | West Germany | 1:40.62 | +3.94 |
| 14 | 12 | Karen Budge | United States | 1:40.68 | +4.00 |
| 15 | 7 | Brigitte Totschnig | Austria | 1:40.73 | +4.05 |
| 15 | 4 | Michèle Jacot | France | 1:40.73 | +4.05 |
| 17 | 26 | Gyri Sørensen | Norway | 1:40.77 | +4.09 |
| 18 | 24 | Silvia Stump | Switzerland | 1:40.92 | +4.24 |
| 18 | 17 | Carolyne Oughton | Canada | 1:40.92 | +4.24 |
| 20 | 27 | Laurie Kreiner | Canada | 1:41.00 | +4.32 |
| 21 | 31 | Sandy Poulsen | United States | 1:41.25 | +4.57 |
| 21 | 29 | Karianne Christiansen | Norway | 1:41.25 | +4.57 |
| 23 | 5 | Florence Steurer | France | 1:41.36 | +4.68 |
| 23 | 25 | Valentina Iliffe | Great Britain | 1:41.36 | +4.68 |
| 25 | 19 | Gina Hathorn | Great Britain | 1:41.42 | +4.74 |
| 26 | 14 | Divina Galica | Great Britain | 1:41.58 | +4.90 |
| 27 | 3 | Judy Crawford | Canada | 1:41.75 | +5.07 |
| 28 | 6 | Marilyn Cochran | United States | 1:41.96 | +5.28 |
| 29 | 23 | Conchita Puig | Spain | 1:42.37 | +5.69 |
| 30 | 1 | Monika Kaserer | Austria | 1:42.59 | +5.91 |
| 31 | 36 | Lotta Sollander | Sweden | 1:42.97 | +6.29 |
| 32 | 37 | Mitsuyo Nagumo | Japan | 1:43.07 | +6.39 |
| 33 | 28 | Kathy Kreiner | Canada | 1:43.68 | +7.00 |
| 34 | 45 | Galina Shikhova | Soviet Union | 1:43.88 | +7.20 |
| 35 | 42 | Miyuki Katagiri | Japan | 1:44.10 | +7.42 |
| 36 | 39 | Pamela Behr | West Germany | 1:44.22 | +7.54 |
| 37 | 38 | Nina Merkulova | Soviet Union | 1:44.48 | +7.80 |
| 38 | 41 | Carol Blackwood | Great Britain | 1:44.61 | +7.93 |
| 39 | 40 | Svetlana Isakova | Soviet Union | 1:44.83 | +8.15 |
| 40 | 43 | Harue Okitsu | Japan | 1:45.37 | +8.69 |
| 41 | 44 | Emiko Okazaki | Japan | 1:49.00 | +12.32 |
