= Cross-country skiing at the 1972 Winter Olympics – Men's 30 kilometre =

Men's 30 kilometre at the XI Olympic Winter Games
- Venue: Makomanai Cross Country Events Site
- Dates: 4 February 1972
- Competitors: 59 from 18 nations
- Winning time: 1:36:31.15

Medalists
1st place, gold medalist(s)		Vyacheslav Vedenin; Soviet Union
2nd place, silver medalist(s)		Pål Tyldum; Norway
3rd place, bronze medalist(s)		Johs Harviken; Norway

The men's 30 kilometre cross-country skiing competition at the 1972 Winter Olympics in Sapporo, Japan, was held on Friday 4 February at the Makomanai Cross Country Events Site.

Each skier started at half a minute intervals, skiing the entire 30 kilometre course. Vyacheslav Vedenin of the Soviet Union was the 1970 World champion and Franco Nones of Italy was the defending Olympic champion from the 1968 Olympics in Grenoble, France.

== Results ==
Rank	Bib	Name	Country	Time	Deficit
1st place, gold medalist(s)	54	Vyacheslav Vedenin	Soviet Union	1:36:31.15	–
2nd place, silver medalist(s)	60	Pål Tyldum	Norway	1:37:25.30	+54.15
3rd place, bronze medalist(s)	36	Johs Harviken	Norway	1:37:32.44	+1:01.29
4	35	Gunnar Larsson	Sweden	1:37:33.72	+1:02.57
5	57	Walter Demel	West Germany	1:37:45.53	+1:14.38
6	18	Fyodor Simashov	Soviet Union	1:38:22.50	+1:51.35
7	12	Alois Kälin	Switzerland	1:38:40.72	+2:09.57
8	53	Gert-Dietmar Klause	East Germany	1:39:15.54	+2:44.39
9	58	Stanislav Henych	Czechoslovakia	1:39:24.29	+2:53.14
10	45	Gerhard Gehring	West Germany	1:39:44.47	+3:13.32
11	27	Lars-Göran Åslund	Sweden	1:39:45.29	+3:14.14
12	24	Axel Lesser	East Germany	1:39:49.24	+3:18.09
13	52	Sven-Åke Lundbäck	Sweden	1:39:54.35	+3:23.20
14	44	Eduard Hauser	Switzerland	1:40:14.98	+3:43.83
15	2	Yury Skobov	Soviet Union	1:40:18.70	+3:47.55
16	43	Vladimir Dolganov	Soviet Union	1:40:48.85	+4:17.70
17	50	Alfred Kälin	Switzerland	1:41:35.34	+5:04.19
18	8	Gerd Heßler	East Germany	1:41:37.47	+5:06.32
19	15	Eero Mäntyranta	Finland	1:41:40.51	+5:09.36
20	38	Elviro Blanc	Italy	1:41:44.32	+5:13.17
21	19	Magne Myrmo	Norway	1:42:23.40	+5:52.25
22	13	Teuvo Hatunen	Finland	1:42:27.18	+5:56.03
23	49	Kunio Shibata	Japan	1:42:30.83	+5:59.68
24	48	Ulrico Kostner	Italy	1:42:44.06	+6:12.91
25	41	Jean-Paul Vandel	France	1:42:45.88	+6:14.73
26	47	Mike Elliott	United States	1:43:15.03	+6:43.88
27	37	Eberhard Klessen	East Germany	1:43:15.99	+6:44.84
28	7	Thomas Magnusson	Sweden	1:43:26.02	+6:54.87
29	39	Jan Staszel	Poland	1:43:35.68	+7:04.53
30	23	Mike Gallagher	United States	1:43:39.41	+7:08.26
31	6	Ole Ellefsæter	Norway	1:44:25.21	+7:54.06
32	9	Renzo Chiocchetti	Italy	1:44:35.03	+8:03.88
33	55	Herbert Wachter	Austria	1:44:45.67	+8:14.52
34	40	Ján Fajstavr	Czechoslovakia	1:44:49.45	+8:18.30
35	29	Hartmut Döpp	West Germany	1:44:51.05	+8:19.90
36	14	Attilio Lombard	Italy	1:45:03.72	+8:32.57
37	32	Hideo Tanifuji	Japan	1:45:37.13	+9:05.98
38	10	Edgar Eckert	West Germany	1:45:38.51	+9:07.36
39	26	Petar Pankov	Bulgaria	1:45:50.66	+9:19.51
40	30	Ján Michalko	Czechoslovakia	1:46:19.36	+9:48.21
41	21	Werner Geeser	Switzerland	1:46:20.36	+9:49.21
42	11	Bob Gray	United States	1:46:38.31	+10:07.16
43	46	Malcolm Hunter	Canada	1:46:51.47	+10:20.32
44	3	Seiji Kudo	Japan	1:47:00.40	+10:29.25
45	56	Daniel Cerisey	France	1:47:03.01	+10:31.86
46	42	Ventseslav Stoyanov	Bulgaria	1:47:11.68	+10:40.53
47	22	Tomio Okamura	Japan	1:47:50.22	+11:19.07
48	34	Heinrich Wallner	Austria	1:48:05.42	+11:34.27
49	1	Gilbert Faure	France	1:48:12.19	+11:41.04
50	20	Jan Omholt-Jensen	Canada	1:51:14.04	+14:42.89
51	17	Danzangiin Narantungalag	Mongolia	1:51:29.88	+14:58.73
52	4	Namsrain Sandagdorj	Mongolia	1:52:14.67	+15:43.52
53	59	Clark Matis	United States	1:52:18.52	+15:47.37
54	31	Keith Oliver	Great Britain	1:54:10.60	+17:39.45
55	25	Terence Palliser	Great Britain	1:54:39.41	+18:08.26
	16	Josef Hauser	Austria	DNF	
	28	Roland Jeannerod	France	DNF	
	33	Raimo Lehtinen	Finland	DNF	
	51	Osmo Karjalainen	Finland	DNF	
	5	Ján Ilavský	Czechoslovakia	DNS	
