= Luge at the 1972 Winter Olympics – Men's singles =

Men's singles at the XI Olympic Winter Games
- Venue: Sapporo Teine
- Dates: 4–7 February 1972
- Competitors: 45 from 13 nations
- Winning time: 3:27.58

Medalists
1st place, gold medalist(s)		Wolfgang Scheidel	East Germany
2nd place, silver medalist(s)		Harald Ehrig	East Germany
3rd place, bronze medalist(s)		Wolfram Fiedler	East Germany

The men's singles luge competition at the 1972 Winter Olympics in Sapporo took place from 4 to 7 February, at Sapporo Teine.

== Results ==
Rank	Athlete	Country	Run 1	Run 2	Run 3	Run 4	Total
1st place, gold medalist(s)	Wolfgang Scheidel	East Germany	52.17	52.06	51.58	51.77	3:27.58
2nd place, silver medalist(s)	Harald Ehrig	East Germany	52.60	52.32	51.74	51.73	3:28.39
3rd place, bronze medalist(s)	Wolfram Fiedler	East Germany	53.04	52.55	51.61	51.53	3:28.73
4	Klaus-Michael Bonsack	East Germany	52.98	52.72	51.54	51.92	3:29.16
5	Leonhard Nagenrauft	West Germany	53.00	52.79	51.97	51.91	3:29.67
6	Josef Fendt	West Germany	53.03	52.73	52.25	52.02	3:30.03
7	Manfred Schmid	Austria	53.06	52.80	52.19	52.00	3:30.05
8	Paul Hildgartner	Italy	53.66	52.76	51.94	52.19	3:30.55
9	Karl Brunner	Italy	53.14	53.26	52.28	52.19	3:30.87
10	Josef Feistmantl	Austria	53.18	53.11	52.52	52.51	3:31.32
11	Emilio Lechner	Italy	53.59	53.49	52.20	52.13	3:31.41
12	Janusz Grzemowski	Poland	53.07	53.12	52.66	52.59	3:31.44
13	Lucjan Kudzia	Poland	54.14	53.58	52.36	52.75	3:32.83
14	Christian Strøm	Norway	53.79	53.68	52.46	53.08	3:33.01
15	Wolfgang Winkler	West Germany	54.07	53.53	52.66	52.82	3:33.08
16	Rudolf Schmid	Austria	54.33	53.93	52.74	52.76	3:33.76
17	Hans Wimmer	West Germany	54.09	53.82	52.62	53.27	3:33.80
18	Masako Eguchi	Japan	54.09	53.37	52.78	53.57	3:33.81
19	Ryszard Gawior	Poland	54.72	54.09	53.26	52.87	3:34.94
20	Kazuaki Ichikawa	Japan	54.09	54.21	53.29	53.40	3:34.99
21	Leo Atzwanger	Italy	54.41	54.32	53.38	53.22	3:35.33
22	Stephen Sinding	Norway	54.98	54.05	53.19	53.19	3:35.41
23	Franz Schachner	Austria	54.67	54.38	53.40	53.17	3:35.62
24	Masatoshi Kobayashi	Japan	55.30	54.43	53.00	53.66	3:36.39
25	Larry Arbuthnot	Canada	54.11	54.17	54.17	54.12	3:36.57
26	Satoru Arai	Japan	54.76	55.07	53.75	53.73	3:37.31
27	Mirosław Więckowski	Poland	54.43	54.82	54.61	53.75	3:37.61
28	James Murray	United States	55.31	55.22	53.94	53.46	3:37.93
29	Yury Yegorov	Soviet Union	55.08	54.58	54.64	53.70	3:38.00
30	Bjørn Dyrdahl	Norway	54.73	55.13	54.67	53.52	3:38.05
31	Terry O'Brien	United States	55.41	55.17	54.02	53.64	3:38.24
32	Ralph Havens	United States	55.17	54.84	54.31	54.00	3:38.32
33	Sergey Osipov	Soviet Union	55.48	55.27	54.06	54.18	3:38.99
34	Jonnie Woodall	Great Britain	55.11	55.21	54.78	55.05	3:40.15
35	David McComb	Canada	55.20	56.14	54.52	54.57	3:40.43
36	Pierre Larchier	France	55.86	56.28	54.68	54.94	3:41.76
37	Viktor Ilyin	Soviet Union	56.12	55.50	55.21	55.25	3:42.08
38	Doug Hansen	Canada	55.73	55.94	55.20	55.35	3:42.22
39	Werner Sele	Liechtenstein	56.39	56.04	55.03	54.92	3:42.38
40	Jeremy Palmer-Tomkinson	Great Britain	57.23	55.59	55.36	55.43	3:43.61
41	Yury Svetikov	Soviet Union	1:00.82	55.01	54.08	53.78	3:43.69
42	Richard Liversedge	Great Britain	57.38	57.08	55.71	56.32	3:46.49
43	Rupert Deen	Great Britain	59.21	59.65	58.00	58.58	3:55.44
44	Bob Rock Jr.	United States	55.98	55.25	53.85	1:13.96	3:59.04
-	Paul Nielsen	Canada	DNF	-	-	-	-
