= Nordic combined at the 1972 Winter Olympics =

Nordic combined at the XI Olympic Winter Games
- Venue: Miyanomori Ski Jump Stadium (ski jumping); Makomanai Park (cross-country skiing)
- Dates: 4–5 February 1976
- Competitors: 40 from 14 nations
- Winning Score: 413.340

Medalists
1st place, gold medalist(s)		Ulrich Wehling	East Germany
2nd place, silver medalist(s)		Rauno Miettinen	Finland
3rd place, bronze medalist(s)		Karl-Heinz Luck	East Germany

Nordic combined at the 1972 Winter Olympics consisted of one event, held from 4 February to 5 February. The ski jumping portion took place at Miyanomori Ski Jump Stadium, while the cross-country portion took place at Makomanai Park.

== Medal summary ==
=== Medal table ===
Rank	Nation	Gold	Silver	Bronze	Total
1	East Germany	1	0	1	2
2	Finland	0	1	0	1
Totals (2 entries)		1	1	1	3

=== Events ===
Event	Gold		Silver		Bronze	
Individual	Ulrich Wehling; East Germany	413.340	Rauno Miettinen; Finland	405.505	Karl-Heinz Luck; East Germany	398.800

== Individual ==
Athletes did three normal hill ski jumps, with the lowest score dropped. They then raced a 15 kilometre cross-country course, with the time converted to points. The athlete with the highest combined points score was awarded the gold medal.

Rank	Name	Country	Ski Jumping					Cross-country			Total
Rank	Name	Country	Jump 1	Jump 2	Jump 3	Total	Rank	Time	Points	Rank	Total
1st place, gold medalist(s)	Ulrich Wehling	East Germany	101.6	99.3	~~96.2~~	200.9	4	49:15.3	212.440	3	413.340
2nd place, silver medalist(s)	Rauno Miettinen	Finland	~~94.4~~	103.9	106.1	210.0	2	51:08.2	195.505	15	405.505
3rd place, bronze medalist(s)	Karl-Heinz Luck	East Germany	85.0	93.8	~~65.4~~	178.8	17	48:24.9	220.000	1	398.800
4	Erkki Kilpinen	Finland	~~78.8~~	91.5	93.5	185.0	9	49:52.6	206.845	4	391.845
5	Yuji Katsuro	Japan	~~90.4~~	92.1	103.0	195.1	6	51:10.9	195.100	18	390.200
6	Tomáš Kučera	Czechoslovakia	95.1	96.7	~~86.6~~	191.8	7	51:04.0	196.135	14	387.935
7	Aleksandr Nosov	Soviet Union	~~80.8~~	100.4	100.9	201.3	3	52:08.7	186.430	27	387.730
8	Kåre Olav Berg	Norway	~~74.0~~	90.9	89.5	180.4	16	50:08.9	204.400	7	384.800
9	Günter Deckert	East Germany	104.9	~~77.0~~	78.5	183.4	12	50:41.1	199.570	10	382.970
10	Ralph Pöhland	West Germany	~~81.4~~	90.7	84.1	174.8	22	49:55.6	206.395	5	381.195
11	Mikhail Artyukhov	Soviet Union	91.4	~~88.2~~	91.6	183.0	14	50:57.0	197.185	12	380.185
12	Kazimierz Długopolski	Poland	93.1	~~89.7~~	91.8	184.9	10	51:38.5	190.960	24	375.860
13	Hideki Nakano	Japan	109.5	111.0	~~108.8~~	220.5	1	55:41.2	154.555	39	375.055
14	Kjell Åsvestad	Norway	~~87.9~~	90.5	92.6	183.1	13	51:36.2	191.305	23	374.405
15	Kazuo Araya	Japan	~~88.5~~	100.3	99.4	199.7	5	53:29.3	174.340	34	374.040
16	Ezio Damolin	Italy	~~80.1~~	84.9	90.3	175.2	21	50:58.1	197.020	13	372.220
17	Stefan Hula	Poland	~~77.2~~	92.9	85.3	178.2	18	51:29.4	192.325	21	370.525
18	Hans Hartleb	East Germany	91.2	92.7	~~71.8~~	183.9	11	52:14.2	185.605	28	369.505
19	Henning Weid	Norway	~~85.6~~	90.0	91.3	181.3	15	51:58.1	188.020	25	369.320
20	Urban Hettich	West Germany	78.3	73.8	~~73.5~~	152.1	32	49:00.4	214.675	2	366.775
21	Mike Devecka	United States	~~63.3~~	77.6	79.5	157.1	27	50:00.0	205.735	6	362.835
22	Anatoly Zaytsev	Soviet Union	~~69.6~~	78.3	80.0	158.3	26	50:10.4	204.175	8	362.475
23	Gjert Andersen	Norway	81.5	91.8	~~72.7~~	173.3	23	52:04.8	187.015	26	360.315
24	Nobutaka Sasaki	Japan	90.8	99.5	~~84.5~~	190.3	8	54:00.6	169.645	37	359.945
25	Alfred Winkler	West Germany	84.2	91.4	~~82.5~~	175.6	20	52:41.5	181.510	32	357.110
26	Ladislav Rygl	Czechoslovakia	76.1	~~59.6~~	84.3	160.4	24	51:09.2	195.355	16	355.755
27	Jukka Kuvaja	Finland	76.4	~~75.9~~	83.8	160.2	25	51:17.0	194.185	19	354.385
28	Jaroslav Svoboda	Czechoslovakia	~~84.9~~	89.8	86.1	175.9	19	53:20.2	175.705	33	351.605
29	Vyacheslav Dryagin	Soviet Union	~~40.8~~	72.5	73.7	146.2	35	50:29.4	201.325	9	347.525
30	Fabio Morandini	Italy	61.9	79.6	~~39.2~~	141.5	36	50:43.7	199.180	11	340.680
31	Józef Gąsienica	Poland	~~62.9~~	82.4	64.4	146.8	34	51:29.4	192.325	21	339.125
32	Janez Gorjanc	Yugoslavia	~~66.7~~	78.3	77.5	155.8	28	52:40.1	181.720	31	337.520
33	Franz Keller	West Germany	~~72.4~~	73.7	80.3	154.0	31	52:32.5	182.860	30	336.860
34	Jim Miller	United States	~~50.8~~	80.8	58.9	139.7	37	51:09.9	195.250	17	334.950
35	Jacques Gaillard	France	76.3	79.1	~~73.4~~	155.4	29	53:59.5	169.810	35	325.210
36	Sven-Olof Israelsson	Sweden	70.7	59.6	~~55.6~~	130.3	39	51:24.9	193.000	20	323.300
37	Ulli Öhlböck	Austria	~~62.2~~	72.7	78.2	150.9	33	53:59.5	169.810	35	320.710
38	Teyck Weed	United States	~~55.6~~	66.5	63.3	129.8	40	52:26.2	183.805	29	313.605
39	Bob Kendall	United States	~~58.0~~	67.9	71.1	139.0	38	54:34.0	164.635	38	303.635
-	Libor Foltman	Czechoslovakia	80.1	74.9	~~42.0~~	155.0	30	DNF	-	-	-

== Participating National Olympic Committees ==
Fourteen nations participated in the Nordic combined at the Sapporo Games.

- Austria (1)
- Finland (3)
- France (1)
- West Germany (4)
- East Germany (4)
- Italy (2)
- Japan (4)
- Norway (4)
- Poland (3)
- Sweden (1)
- Czechoslovakia (4)
- Soviet Union (4)
- United States (4)
- Yugoslavia (1)
