= Luge at the 1972 Winter Olympics – Doubles =

Doubles at the XI Olympic Winter Games
- Venue: Sapporo Teine
- Dates: 10 February 1972
- Competitors: 40 from 11 nations
- Winning time: 1:28.35

Medalists
1st place, gold medalist(s)		Horst Hörnlein, Reinhard Bredow	East Germany
1st place, gold medalist(s)		Paul Hildgartner, Walter Plaikner	Italy
3rd place, bronze medalist(s)		Klaus-Michael Bonsack, Wolfram Fiedler	East Germany

The Doubles luge competition at the 1972 Winter Olympics in Sapporo was held on 10 February, at Sapporo Teine. A malfunctioning starting gate cancelled the results of the first run. Italy, whose doubles team of Paul Hildgartner and Walter Plaikner won the first run, protested to event officials the results should stand since all contestants had suffered equally, but to no avail. After the protest was denied, a rerun was ordered.

Hildgartner and Plaikner won the first run of the rerun event while the East German team of Horst Hörnlein and Reinhard Bredow had the fastest second run. The combined times were equal for the only time in Winter Olympic luge history. The International Luge Federation consulted with IOC President Avery Brundage on this matter, and gold medals were awarded to both teams as a result. By the time of the 1976 Winter Olympics, artificial track luge would be timed in thousandths of a second (0.001) rather than hundredths of a second (0.01) in an effort to avoid ties. That would prove effective until the FIL European Luge Championships 2008 at Cesana, when another tie occurred. This tie was again in the men's doubles event and it again involved Italy and Germany (East and West Germany reunified in 1990) only this time it was for a bronze medal rather than gold.

== Results ==
Rank	Athletes	Country	Run 1	Run 2	Total
1st place, gold medalist(s)	Paul Hildgartner; Walter Plaikner	Italy	44.21	44.14	1:28.35
1st place, gold medalist(s)	Horst Hörnlein; Reinhard Bredow	East Germany	44.27	44.08	1:28.35
3rd place, bronze medalist(s)	Klaus-Michael Bonsack; Wolfram Fiedler	East Germany	44.69	44.47	1:29.16
4	Satoru Arai; Masatoshi Kobayashi	Japan	44.73	44.90	1:29.63
5	Hans Brandner; Balthasar Schwarm	West Germany	44.86	44.80	1:29.66
5	Mirosław Więckowski; Wojciech Kubik	Poland	44.88	44.78	1:29.66
7	Manfred Schmid; Ewald Walch	Austria	44.92	44.83	1:29.75
8	Sigisfredo Mair; Ernesto Mair	Italy	45.22	45.04	1:30.26
9	Lucjan Kudzia; Ryszard Gawior	Poland	45.28	45.40	1:30.68
9	Rudolf Schmid; Franz Schachner	Austria	45.37	45.31	1:30.68
11	Stefan Hölzlwimmer; Hans Wimmer	West Germany	45.61	45.31	1:30.92
12	Yury Svetikov; Sergey Osipov	Soviet Union	45.64	45.48	1:31.12
13	Yury Yegorov; Viktor Ilyin	Soviet Union	45.66	45.53	1:31.19
14	Christian Strøm; Stephen Sinding	Norway	45.81	46.25	1:32.06
15	Jack Elder; Frank Jones Jr.	United States	46.48	46.11	1:32.59
16	Larry Arbuthnot; Doug Hansen	Canada	46.47	46.22	1:32.69
17	Robert Berkley Jr. Richard Cavanaugh	United States	46.58	46.59	1:33.17
18	Masako Eguchi; Kazuaki Ichikawa	Japan	46.93	46.63	1:33.56
19	Stephen Marsh; Jonnie Woodall	Great Britain	46.77	47.05	1:33.82
20	Michel de Carvalho; Jeremy Palmer-Tomkinson	Great Britain	47.09	47.50	1:34.59
