= Luge at the 1972 Winter Olympics – Women's singles =

Women's singles at the XI Olympic Winter Games
- Venue: Sapporo Teine
- Dates: 4–7 February 1972
- Competitors: 22 from 8 nations
- Winning time: 2:59.18

Medalists
1st place, gold medalist(s)		Anna-Maria Müller	East Germany
2nd place, silver medalist(s)		Ute Rührold	East Germany
3rd place, bronze medalist(s)		Margit Schumann	East Germany

The Women's singles luge competition at the 1972 Winter Olympics in Sapporo was held from 4 to 7 February, at Sapporo Teine.

== Results ==
Rank	Athlete	Country	Run 1	Run 2	Run 3	Run 4	Total
1st place, gold medalist(s)	Anna-Maria Müller	East Germany	45.00	45.00	44.86	44.32	2:59.18
2nd place, silver medalist(s)	Ute Rührold	East Germany	44.95	45.23	44.76	44.55	2:59.49
3rd place, bronze medalist(s)	Margit Schumann	East Germany	44.95	45.38	44.65	44.56	2:59.54
4	Elisabeth Demleitner	West Germany	45.45	45.62	45.08	44.65	3:00.80
5	Yuko Otaka	Japan	45.21	45.65	45.39	44.73	3:00.98
6	Halina Kanasz	Poland	45.66	45.98	45.52	45.17	3:02.33
6	Wiesława Martyka	Poland	45.68	46.12	45.47	45.06	3:02.33
8	Sarah Felder	Italy	45.90	45.93	45.99	45.08	3:02.90
9	Barbara Piecha	Poland	45.96	46.24	45.89	44.98	3:03.07
10	Christa Schmuck	West Germany	45.98	46.01	45.99	45.21	3:03.19
11	Angelika Schafferer	Austria	46.00	46.41	45.94	45.71	3:04.06
12	Nina Shashkova	Soviet Union	46.18	46.38	46.36	45.46	3:04.38
13	Hiroko Shibuya	Japan	46.66	46.41	45.89	45.49	3:04.45
14	Antonia Mayr	Austria	46.15	46.36	45.97	46.12	3:04.60
15	Kathleen Ann Roberts-Homstad	United States	47.68	46.64	46.17	45.49	3:05.98
16	Margit Graf	Austria	46.89	46.92	46.25	46.23	3:06.29
17	Nina Ignatyeva	Soviet Union	46.82	46.84	46.70	46.09	3:06.45
18	Gisela Otto	West Germany	47.04	46.78	46.73	45.99	3:06.54
19	Miyako Kawase	Japan	47.93	47.31	46.72	46.14	3:08.10
20	Nataliya Omsheva	Soviet Union	47.18	47.39	46.85	46.85	3:08.27
-	Erika Lechner	Italy	48.76	49.39	50.51	DNF	-
-	Peggy Frair	United States	DNF	-	-	-	-
