= Norway at the 1972 Winter Olympics =

- IOC code: NOR
- NOC: Norwegian Olympic Committee

in Sapporo, Japan February 3–13, 1972
- Competitors: 67 (56 men, 11 women) in 8 sports
- Flag bearer: Magnar Solberg (Biathlon)
- Medals Ranked 7th: Gold 2 Silver 5 Bronze 5 Total 12

Winter Olympics appearances (overview)
- 1924; 1928; 1932; 1936; 1948; 1952; 1956; 1960; 1964; 1968; 1972; 1976; 1980; 1984; 1988; 1992; 1994; 1998; 2002; 2006; 2010; 2014; 2018; 2022; 2026

Norway competed at the 1972 Winter Olympics in Sapporo, Japan.

== Medalists ==
| Medal | Name | Sport | Event |
|---|---|---|---|
| Gold | Magnar Solberg | Biathlon | Men's 20 km |
| Gold | Pål Tyldum | Cross-country skiing | Men's 50 km (classical) |
| Silver | Pål Tyldum | Cross-country skiing | Men's 30 km (classical) |
| Silver | Magne Myrmo | Cross-country skiing | Men's 50 km (classical) |
| Silver | Oddvar Brå; Pål Tyldum; Ivar Formo; Johs Harviken | Cross-country skiing | Men's 4 × 10 km relay |
| Silver | Roar Grønvold | Speed skating | Men's 1500m |
| Silver | Roar Grønvold | Speed skating | Men's 5000m |
| Bronze | Ivar Formo | Cross-country skiing | Men's 15 km (classical) |
| Bronze | Johs Harviken | Cross-country skiing | Men's 30 km (classical) |
| Bronze | Inger Aufles; Aslaug Dahl; Berit Mørdre Lammedal | Cross-country skiing | Women's 3 × 5 km relay |
| Bronze | Sten Stensen | Speed skating | Men's 5000m |
| Bronze | Sten Stensen | Speed skating | Men's 10,000m |

== Alpine skiing ==
Men

| Athlete | Event | Race 1 | | Race 2 | | Total | |
| Athlete | Event | Time | Rank | Time | Rank | Time | Rank |
|---|---|---|---|---|---|---|---|
| Peik Christensen | Downhill | | | | | 1:59.71 | 36 |
| Erik Håker | Downhill | | | | | 1:53.16 | 5 |
| Otto Tschudi | Giant Slalom | 1:57.42 | 50 | DSQ | – | DSQ | – |
| Peik Christensen | Giant Slalom | 1:38.27 | 33 | 1:40.42 | 17 | 3:18.69 | 23 |
| Erik Håker | Giant Slalom | 1:31.70 | 1 | DNF | – | DNF | – |

Men's slalom

| Athlete | Classification | | Final | | | | | |
| Athlete | Time | Rank | Time 1 | Rank | Time 2 | Rank | Total | Rank |
|---|---|---|---|---|---|---|---|---|
| Peik Christensen | 1:45.36 | 2 | DSQ | – | – | – | DSQ | – |
| Erik Håker | DSQ | – | DNF | – | – | – | DNF | – |
| Otto Tschudi | DSQ | – | DSQ | – | – | – | DSQ | – |

Women

| Athlete | Event | Race 1 | | Race 2 | | Total | |
| Athlete | Event | Time | Rank | Time | Rank | Time | Rank |
|---|---|---|---|---|---|---|---|
| Karianne Christiansen | Downhill | | | | | 1:41.25 | 21 |
| Gyri Sørensen | Downhill | | | | | 1:40.77 | 17 |
| Toril Førland | Downhill | | | | | 1:40.25 | 11 |
| Gyri Sørensen | Giant Slalom | | | | | 1:37.32 | 28 |
| Karianne Christiansen | Giant Slalom | | | | | 1:37.18 | 27 |
| Anne Brusletto | Giant Slalom | | | | | 1:34.43 | 19 |
| Toril Førland | Giant Slalom | | | | | 1:34.15 | 17 |
| Gyri Sørensen | Slalom | DSQ | – | – | – | DSQ | – |
| Anne Brusletto | Slalom | DNF | – | – | – | DNF | – |
| Karianne Christiansen | Slalom | 52.59 | 24 | DNF | – | DNF | – |
| Toril Førland | Slalom | 47.75 | 10 | 48.01 | 11 | 1:35.76 | 9 |

== Biathlon ==
Men

| Event | Athlete | Time | Penalties | Adjusted time ^{1} | Rank |
|---|---|---|---|---|---|
| 20 km | Ragnar Tveiten | 1'17:19.91 | 7 | 1'24:19.91 | 29 |
| 20 km | Kåre Hovda | 1'16:20.37 | 6 | 1'22:20.37 | 18 |
| 20 km | Tor Svendsberget | 1'15:26.54 | 3 | 1'18:26.54 | 8 |
| 20 km | Magnar Solberg | 1'13:55.50 | 2 | 1'15:55.50 | 1st place, gold medalist(s) |

^{1} One minute added per close miss (a hit in the outer ring), two minutes added per complete miss.

Men's 4 x 7.5 km relay

| Athletes | Race | | |
| Athletes | Misses ^{2} | Time | Rank |
|---|---|---|---|
| Tor Svendsberget; Kåre Hovda; Ivar Nordkild; Magnar Solberg | 7 | 1'56:24.21 | 4 |

^{2} A penalty loop of 200 metres had to be skied per missed target.

== Cross-country skiing ==
Men

| Event | Athlete | Race | |
| Event | Athlete | Time | Rank |
|---|---|---|---|
| 15 km | Magne Myrmo | 47:02.55 | 19 |
| 15 km | Johs Harviken | 46:46.36 | 15 |
| 15 km | Oddvar Brå | 46:25.88 | 9 |
| 15 km | Ivar Formo | 46:02.68 | 3rd place, bronze medalist(s) |
| 30 km | Ole Ellefsæter | 1'44:25.21 | 31 |
| 30 km | Magne Myrmo | 1'42:23.40 | 21 |
| 30 km | Johs Harviken | 1'37:32.44 | 3rd place, bronze medalist(s) |
| 30 km | Pål Tyldum | 1'37:25.30 | 2nd place, silver medalist(s) |
| 50 km | Ole Ellefsæter | 2'46:46.94 | 10 |
| 50 km | Reidar Hjermstad | 2'44:14.51 | 4 |
| 50 km | Magne Myrmo | 2'43:29.45 | 2nd place, silver medalist(s) |
| 50 km | Pål Tyldum | 2'43:14.75 | 1st place, gold medalist(s) |

Men's 4 × 10 km relay

| Athletes | Race | |
| Athletes | Time | Rank |
|---|---|---|
| Oddvar Brå; Pål Tyldum; Ivar Formo; Johs Harviken | 2'04:57.06 | 2nd place, silver medalist(s) |

Women

| Event | Athlete | Race | |
| Event | Athlete | Time | Rank |
|---|---|---|---|
| 5 km | Katharina Mo-Berge | 17:49.06 | 17 |
| 5 km | Inger Aufles | 17:33.14 | 12 |
| 5 km | Aslaug Dahl | 17:17.49 | 8 |
| 5 km | Berit Mørdre-Lammedal | 17:16.79 | 7 |
| 10 km | Katharina Mo-Berge | 37:33.16 | 29 |
| 10 km | Berit Mørdre-Lammedal | 36:29.43 | 14 |
| 10 km | Inger Aufles | 36:07.08 | 12 |
| 10 km | Aslaug Dahl | 35:18.84 | 6 |

Women's 3 × 5 km relay

| Athletes | Race | |
| Athletes | Time | Rank |
|---|---|---|
| Inger Aufles; Aslaug Dahl; Berit Mørdre-Lammedal | 49:51.49 | 3rd place, bronze medalist(s) |

== Ice hockey ==
=== First round ===
Winners (in bold) entered the Medal Round. Other teams played a consolation round for 7th-11th places.

| Team 1 | Score | Team 2 |
|---|---|---|
| **Finland** | 13–1 | Norway |

=== Consolation Round ===
| Rank | Team | Pld | W | L | T | GF | GA | Pts |
|---|---|---|---|---|---|---|---|---|
| **7** | West Germany | 4 | 3 | 1 | 0 | 22 | 10 | **6** |
| **8** | Norway | 4 | 3 | 1 | 0 | 16 | 14 | **6** |
| **9** | Japan | 4 | 2 | 1 | 1 | 17 | 16 | **5** |
| **10** | Switzerland | 4 | 0 | 2 | 2 | 9 | 16 | **2** |
| **11** | (Socialist Federal Republic of Yugoslavia) Yugoslavia | 4 | 0 | 3 | 1 | 9 | 17 | **1** |

- Norway 5-2 Yugoslavia
- West Germany 5-1 Norway
- Japan 4-5 Norway
- Norway 5-3 Switzerland

| **Contestants**; Kåre Østensen; Thore Wålberg; Øivind Berg; Jan Kinder; Svein Norman Hansen; Terje Steen; Birger Jansen; Thor Martinsen; Tom Røymark; Tom Christensen; Steinar Bjølbakk; Svein Haagensen; Roy Jansen; Bjørn Johansen; Morten Sethereng; Terje Thoen; Bjørn Andreassen; Arne Mikkelsen |

== Luge ==
Men

| Athlete | Run 1 | | Run 2 | | Run 3 | | Run 4 | | Total | |
| Athlete | Time | Rank | Time | Rank | Time | Rank | Time | Rank | Time | Rank |
|---|---|---|---|---|---|---|---|---|---|---|
| Stephen Sinding | 54.98 | 27 | 54.05 | 19 | 53.19 | 20 | 53.19 | 19 | 3:35.41 | 22 |
| Bjørn Dyrdahl | 54.73 | 25 | 55.13 | 31 | 54.67 | 36 | 53.52 | 24 | 3:38.05 | 30 |
| Christian Strøm | 53.79 | 13 | 53.68 | 16 | 52.46 | 12 | 53.08 | 17 | 3:33.01 | 14 |

(Men's) Doubles

| Athletes | Run 1 | | Run 2 | | Total | |
| Athletes | Time | Rank | Time | Rank | Time | Rank |
|---|---|---|---|---|---|---|
| Christian Strøm; Stephen Sinding | 45.81 | 14 | 46.25 | 16 | 1:32.06 | 14 |

== Nordic combined ==
Events:

- normal hill ski jumping (Three jumps, best two counted and shown here.)
- 15 km cross-country skiing

| Athlete | Event | Ski Jumping | | | | Cross-country | | | Total | |
| Athlete | Event | Distance 1 | Distance 2 | Points | Rank | Time | Points | Rank | Points | Rank |
|---|---|---|---|---|---|---|---|---|---|---|
| Gjert Andersen | Individual | 67.0 | 71.5 | 173.3 | 23 | 52:04.8 | 187.015 | 26 | 360.315 | 23 |
| Henning Weid | Individual | 71.0 | 74.0 | 181.3 | 15 | 51:58.1 | 188.020 | 25 | 369.320 | 19 |
| Kjell Åsvestad | Individual | 71.0 | 74.0 | 183.1 | 13 | 51:36.2 | 191.305 | 23 | 374.405 | 14 |
| Kåre Olav Berg | Individual | 72.5 | 73.0 | 180.4 | 16 | 50:08.9 | 204.400 | 7 | 384.800 | 8 |

== Ski jumping ==
| Athlete | Event | Jump 1 | | Jump 2 | | Total | |
| Athlete | Event | Distance | Points | Distance | Points | Points | Rank |
|---|---|---|---|---|---|---|---|
| Jo Inge Bjørnebye | Normal hill | 68.5 | 90.3 | 67.0 | 83.9 | 174.2 | 51 |
| Nils-Per Skarseth | Normal hill | 73.5 | 101.3 | 71.0 | 96.3 | 197.6 | 33 |
| Ingolf Mork | Normal hill | 78.0 | 112.0 | 78.0 | 113.5 | 225.5 | 4 |
| Frithjof Prydz | Normal hill | 80.0 | 114.2 | 74.0 | 103.6 | 217.8 | 11 |
| Jo Inge Bjørnebye | Large hill | 85.5 | 86.7 | 81.5 | 81.1 | 167.8 | 34 |
| Frithjof Prydz | Large hill | 85.0 | 89.0 | 95.5 | 105.7 | 194.7 | 15 |
| Ingolf Mork | Large hill | 89.0 | 95.6 | 83.0 | 77.7 | 173.3 | 28 |
| Bjørn Wirkola | Large hill | 93.0 | 97.7 | 74.5 | 64.8 | 162.5 | 37 |

== Speed skating ==
Men

| Event | Athlete | Race | |
| Event | Athlete | Time | Rank |
|---|---|---|---|
| 500 m | Ole Christian Iversen | DNF | – |
| 500 m | Johan Lind | 41.14 | 18 |
| 500 m | Lasse Efskind | 40.60 | 12 |
| 500 m | Per Bjørang | 39.91 | 4 |
| 1500 m | Dag Fornæss | 2:09.52 | 13 |
| 1500 m | Svein-Erik Stiansen | 2:08.63 | 11 |
| 1500 m | Bjørn Tveter | 2:05.94 | 4 |
| 1500 m | Roar Grønvold | 2:04.26 | 2nd place, silver medalist(s) |
| 5000 m | Willy Olsen | 7:36.47 | 5 |
| 5000 m | Sten Stensen | 7:33.39 | 3rd place, bronze medalist(s) |
| 5000 m | Roar Grønvold | 7:28.18 | 2nd place, silver medalist(s) |
| 10,000 m | Dag Fornæss | 15:53.33 | 13 |
| 10,000 m | Per Willy Guttormsen | 15:48.71 | 11 |
| 10,000 m | Sten Stensen | 15:07.88 | 3rd place, bronze medalist(s) |

Women

| Event | Athlete | Race | |
| Event | Athlete | Time | Rank |
|---|---|---|---|
| 500 m | Lisbeth Korsmo-Berg | 46.33 | 19 |
| 500 m | Kirsti Biermann | 46.18 | 17 |
| 500 m | Sigrid Sundby-Dybedahl | 45.70 | 11 |
| 1000 m | Kirsti Biermann | 1:35.76 | 23 |
| 1000 m | Lisbeth Korsmo-Berg | 1:35.56 | 22 |
| 1000 m | Sigrid Sundby-Dybedahl | 1:33.13 | 9 |
| 1500 m | Kirsti Biermann | 2:29.94 | 23 |
| 1500 m | Lisbeth Korsmo-Berg | 2:28.36 | 19 |
| 1500 m | Sigrid Sundby-Dybedahl | 2:24.07 | 8 |
| 3000 m | Kirsti Biermann | 5:26.21 | 20 |
| 3000 m | Sigrid Sundby-Dybedahl | 5:07.76 | 10 |
