= France at the 1972 Winter Olympics =

- IOC code: FRA
- NOC: French National Olympic and Sports Committee

in Sapporo
- Competitors: 40 (33 men, 7 women) in 9 sports
- Flag bearer: Patrick Péra (Figure Skating)
- Medals Ranked 16th: Gold 0 Silver 1 Bronze 2 Total 3

Winter Olympics appearances (overview)
- 1924; 1928; 1932; 1936; 1948; 1952; 1956; 1960; 1964; 1968; 1972; 1976; 1980; 1984; 1988; 1992; 1994; 1998; 2002; 2006; 2010; 2014; 2018; 2022; 2026

France competed at the 1972 Winter Olympics in Sapporo, Japan.

== Medalists ==
| Medal | Name | Sport | Event |
|---|---|---|---|
| Silver | Danièle Debernard | Alpine skiing | Women's slalom |
| Bronze | Florence Steurer | Alpine skiing | Women's slalom |
| Bronze | Patrick Pera | Figure skating | Men's singles |

== Alpine skiing ==
Men

| Athlete | Event | Race 1 | | Race 2 | | Total | |
| Athlete | Event | Time | Rank | Time | Rank | Time | Rank |
|---|---|---|---|---|---|---|---|
| Bernard Charvin | Downhill | | | | | 1:55.33 | 21 |
| Henri Duvillard | Downhill | | | | | 1:55.13 | 19 |
| Bernard Orcel | Downhill | | | | | 1:54.81 | 16 |
| Roger Rossat-Mignod | Downhill | | | | | 1:54.72 | 15 |
| Henri Duvillard | Giant Slalom | DNF | – | – | – | DNF | – |
| Jean-Noël Augert | Giant Slalom | 1:33.61 | 12 | 1:38.23 | 6 | 3:11.84 | 5 |
| Alain Penz | Giant Slalom | 1:33.36 | 9 | 1:39.06 | 9 | 3:12.42 | 9 |
| Roger Rossat-Mignod | Giant Slalom | 1:33.28 | 8 | DSQ | – | DSQ | – |

Men's slalom

| Athlete | Classification | | Final | | | | | |
| Athlete | Time | Rank | Time 1 | Rank | Time 2 | Rank | Total | Rank |
|---|---|---|---|---|---|---|---|---|
| Alain Penz | bye | | 56.72 | 9 | DSQ | – | DSQ | – |
| Henri Duvillard | bye | | 55.92 | 3 | 54.53 | 6 | 1:50.45 | 4 |
| Jean-Noël Augert | bye | | 55.77 | 2 | 54.74 | 10 | 1:50.51 | 5 |

Women

| Athlete | Event | Race 1 | | Race 2 | | Total | |
| Athlete | Event | Time | Rank | Time | Rank | Time | Rank |
|---|---|---|---|---|---|---|---|
| Florence Steurer | Downhill | | | | | 1:41.36 | 23 |
| Michèle Jacot | Downhill | | | | | 1:40.73 | 15 |
| Annie Famose | Downhill | | | | | 1:39.70 | 8 |
| Isabelle Mir | Downhill | | | | | 1:38.62 | 4 |
| Isabelle Mir | Giant Slalom | | | | | 1:35.30 | 21 |
| Michèle Jacot | Giant Slalom | | | | | 1:33.61 | 16 |
| Britt Lafforgue | Giant Slalom | | | | | 1:32.80 | 8 |
| Florence Steurer | Giant Slalom | | | | | 1:32.59 | 6 |
| Michèle Jacot | Slalom | DSQ | – | – | – | DSQ | – |
| Florence Steurer | Slalom | 46.57 | 4 | 46.12 | 3 | 1:32.69 | 3rd place, bronze medalist(s) |
| Britt Lafforgue | Slalom | 46.23 | 3 | DSQ | – | DSQ | – |
| Danièle Debernard | Slalom | 46.08 | 2 | 45.18 | 1 | 1:31.26 | 2nd place, silver medalist(s) |

== Biathlon ==
Men

| Event | Athlete | Time | Penalties | Adjusted time ^{1} | Rank |
|---|---|---|---|---|---|
| 20 km | Paul Chassagne | DNF | – | DNF | – |
| 20 km | Aimé Gruet-Masson | 1'18:44.41 | 15 | 1'33:44.41 | 51 |
| 20 km | René Arpin | 1'19:52.64 | 8 | 1'27:52.64 | 37 |
| 20 km | Daniel Claudon | 1'18:14.67 | 1 | 1'19:14.67 | 10 |

^{1} One minute added per close miss (a hit in the outer ring), two minutes added per complete miss.

Men's 4 x 7.5 km relay

| Athletes | Race | | |
| Athletes | Misses ^{2} | Time | Rank |
|---|---|---|---|
| René Arpin; Noël Turrell; Daniel Claudon; Aimé Gruet-Masson | 4 | 2'03:08.90 | 13 |

^{2} A penalty loop of 200 metres had to be skied per missed target.

== Bobsleigh ==
| Sled | Athletes | Event | Run 1 | | Run 2 | | Run 3 | | Run 4 | | Total | |
| Sled | Athletes | Event | Time | Rank | Time | Rank | Time | Rank | Time | Rank | Time | Rank |
|---|---|---|---|---|---|---|---|---|---|---|---|---|
| FRA-1 | Patrick Parisot; Alain Roy | Two-man | 1:16.66 | 8 | 1:17.17 | 14 | 1:14.53 | 10 | 1:15.10 | 12 | 5:03.46 | 9 |
| FRA-2 | Gérard Christaud-Pipola; Jacques Christaud-Pipola | Two-man | 1:17.08 | 11 | 1:17.25 | 17 | 1:14.81 | 12 | 1:15.05 | 11 | 5:04.19 | 11 |

| Sled | Athletes | Event | Run 1 | | Run 2 | | Run 3 | | Run 4 | | Total | |
| Sled | Athletes | Event | Time | Rank | Time | Rank | Time | Rank | Time | Rank | Time | Rank |
|---|---|---|---|---|---|---|---|---|---|---|---|---|
| FRA-1 | Patrick Parisot; Yves Bonsang; Alain Roy; Gilles Morda | Four-man | 1:11.79 | 9 | 1:12.18 | 6 | 1:11.27 | 11 | 1:11.51 | 11 | 4:46.75 | 9 |

== Cross-country skiing ==
Men

| Event | Athlete | Race | |
| Event | Athlete | Time | Rank |
|---|---|---|---|
| 15 km | Gérard Granclement | 50:07.11 | 48 |
| 15 km | Daniel Cerisey | 50:05.88 | 46 |
| 15 km | Jean-Paul Vandel | 49:22.89 | 39 |
| 15 km | Roland Jeannerod | 48:32.42 | 31 |
| 30 km | Roland Jeannerod | DNF | – |
| 30 km | Gilbert Faure | 1'48:12.19 | 49 |
| 30 km | Daniel Cerisey | 1'47:03.01 | 45 |
| 30 km | Jean-Paul Vandel | 1'42:45.88 | 25 |
| 50 km | Jean Jobez | DNF | – |

Men's 4 × 10 km relay

| Athletes | Race | |
| Athletes | Time | Rank |
|---|---|---|
| Jean-Paul Vandel; Roland Jeannerod; Gilbert Faure; Jean Jobez | 2'14:35.98 | 11 |

== Figure skating ==
Men

| Athlete | CF | FS | Points | Places | Rank |
|---|---|---|---|---|---|
| Jacques Mrozek | 13 | 14 | 2401.3 | 126 | 14 |
| Didier Gailhaguet | 11 | 13 | 2440.9 | 114 | 13 |
| Patrick Péra | 2 | 8 | 2653.1 | 28 | 3rd place, bronze medalist(s) |

Pairs

| Athletes | SP | FS | Points | Places | Rank |
|---|---|---|---|---|---|
| Florence Cahn; Jean Roland Racle | 13 | 12 | 364.5 | 116 | 13 |

== Luge ==
Men

| Athlete | Run 1 | | Run 2 | | Run 3 | | Run 4 | | Total | |
| Athlete | Time | Rank | Time | Rank | Time | Rank | Time | Rank | Time | Rank |
|---|---|---|---|---|---|---|---|---|---|---|
| Pierre Larchier | 55.86 | 37 | 56.28 | 42 | 54.68 | 37 | 54.94 | 37 | 3:41.76 | 36 |

== Nordic combined ==
Events:

- normal hill ski jumping (Three jumps, best two counted and shown here.)
- 15 km cross-country skiing

| Athlete | Event | Ski Jumping | | | | Cross-country | | | Total | |
| Athlete | Event | Distance 1 | Distance 2 | Points | Rank | Time | Points | Rank | Points | Rank |
|---|---|---|---|---|---|---|---|---|---|---|
| Jacques Gaillard | Individual | 67.5 | 67.0 | 155.4 | 29 | 53:59.5 | 169.810 | 35 | 325.210 | 35 |

== Ski jumping ==
| Athlete | Event | Jump 1 | | Jump 2 | | Total | |
| Athlete | Event | Distance | Points | Distance | Points | Points | Rank |
|---|---|---|---|---|---|---|---|
| Alain Macle | Normal hill | 67.5 | 87.2 | 62.5 | 78.7 | 165.9 | 53 |
| Yvan Richard | Normal hill | 68.0 | 88.0 | 63.5 | 76.3 | 164.3 | 54 |
| Gilbert Poirot | Normal hill | 69.5 | 93.4 | 71.0 | 95.3 | 188.7 | 43 |
| Jacques Gaillard | Large hill | 72.0 | 60.8 | 73.5 | 61.9 | 122.7 | 51 |
| Alain Macle | Large hill | 76.0 | 65.9 | 71.0 | 56.9 | 122.8 | 50 |
| Yvan Richard | Large hill | 77.0 | 68.8 | 78.5 | 73.4 | 142.2 | 49 |

== Speed skating ==
Men

| Event | Athlete | Race | |
| Event | Athlete | Time | Rank |
|---|---|---|---|
| 500 m | Richard Tourne | 43.06 | 33 |
| 1500 m | Richard Tourne | 2:16.37 | 33 |
| 5000 m | Richard Tourne | 8:11.52 | 24 |
| 10,000 m | Richard Tourne | 16:48.70 | 22 |
