= Otsue =

Otsue is a surname. Notable people with the surname include:

- Masahiko Otsue (born 1946), Japanese alpine skier, competitor at the 1972 Winter Olympics
- Mihoko Otsue (born 1946), Japanese alpine skier, competitor at the 1968 Winter Olympics
