= Onozawa =

Onozawa (written: 小野沢, 小野澤 or 斧澤) is a Japanese surname. Notable people with the surname include:

- Aiko Onozawa (小野沢 愛子, born 1939), Japanese volleyball player
- Hirotoki Onozawa (小野澤 宏時, born 1978), Japanese rugby union player
- Kaori Onozawa (小野澤 香理, born 1979), Japanese handball player
- Ryoko Onozawa (小野沢 良子, born 1951), Japanese speed skater
- Toshiki Onozawa (斧澤 隼輝, born 1998), Japanese footballer

== Fictional characters ==
- Mirai Onozawa (小野沢 未来), a character in the anime series Tokyo Magnitude 8.0
