= Susan Corrock =

American alpine skier

Personal information
- Born: November 30, 1951 (age 74) Seattle, Washington, U.S.
- Height: 5 ft 4 in (163 cm)
- Website: susieluby.com

Skiing career
- Sport: Alpine skiing
- Club: Sun Valley (ID) Ski Club
- Retired: 1973 (age 21)
- Disciplines: Downhill, giant slalom, slalom, combined
- World Cup debut: January 1970 (age 18)

Olympics
- Teams: 1 - (1972)
- Medals: 1 (0 gold)

World Championships
- Teams: 1 - (1972 Olympics)
- Medals: 1 (0 gold)

World Cup
- Seasons: 4 - (1970–73)
- Podiums: 0
- Overall titles: 0 - (19th in 1972)
- Discipline titles: 0 - (7th in DH, 1972)
Medal record
Women's alpine skiing
Representing the United States
Olympic Games
World Championships
Bronze medal – third place	1972 Sapporo	Downhill

Susan Corrock Luby (born November 30, 1951) is a former World Cup alpine ski racer, a member of the U.S. Ski Team in the early 1970s. Talented in all three disciplines, she had 16 top ten finishes in World Cup competition: eight in downhill, two in giant slalom, and six in slalom.

Born in Seattle, Washington, Corrock skied as a youth at Crystal Mountain and later trained in Ketchum, Idaho, at Sun Valley. She made her World Cup debut in January 1970 at the age of 18. Two years later, Corrock won the bronze medal in the downhill at the 1972 Winter Olympics in Sapporo, Japan, the only podium of her international career. She later finished ninth in the slalom event, won by teammate Barbara Cochran; three Americans placed in the top ten. Corrock competed on the World Cup circuit for four seasons, retiring after the 1973 season at the age of 21.

In the real estate business, Corrock lived in Vail, Colorado, in the 1980s and later relocated to Spokane, Washington, with husband Bob Luby and their two children.

== World Cup results ==
=== Season standings ===
Season	Age	Overall	Slalom	Giant slalom	Downhill
1970	18	30	21	—	—
1971	19	24	22	23	11
1972	20	19	17	—	7
1973	21	35	27	—	21

Points were only awarded for top ten finishes (see scoring system).

=== Top ten finishes ===
- 16 top tens (8 DH, 2 GS, 6 SL)

Season	Date	Location	Race	Place
1970	13 Jan 1970	Bad Gastein, Austria	Slalom	8th
1970	1 Mar 1970	Vancouver, BC, Canada	Slalom	8th
1971	4 Jan 1971	(Socialist Federal Republic of Yugoslavia) Maribor, Yugoslavia	Slalom	9th
1971	13 Feb 1971	Mt. Ste. Anne, QC, Canada	Slalom	9th
1971	18 Feb 1971	(United States) Sugarloaf, ME, USA	Downhill	6th
1971	19 Feb 1971	(United States) Sugarloaf, ME, USA	Downhill	10th
1971	26 Feb 1971	(United States) Heavenly Valley, CA, USA	Giant slalom	9th
1971	14 Mar 1971	Åre, Sweden	Giant slalom	10th
1972	18 Dec 1971	Sestriere, Italy	Slalom	5th
1972	12 Jan 1972	Bad Gastein, Austria	Downhill	10th
1972	18 Jan 1972	Grindelwald, Switzerland	Downhill	8th
1972	(Japan) 1972 Winter Olympics			
1972	25 Feb 1972	(United States) Crystal Mtn, WA, USA	Downhill	8th
1972	26 Feb 1972	(United States) Crystal Mtn, WA, USA	Downhill	5th
1973	16 Jan 1973	Grindelwald, Switzerland	Downhill	9th
1973	25 Jan 1973	Chamonix, France	Downhill	9th
1973	2 Feb 1973	Schruns, Austria	Slalom	10th

== Olympic results ==
Year	Age	Slalom	Giant slalom	Super-G	Downhill	Combined
1972	20	9	—	—N/a	3	—N/a

- From 1948 through 1980, the Winter Olympics were also the World Championships for alpine skiing.
