= Hartleb =

Hartleb is a surname. Notable people with the surname include:

- Dan Hartleb (born 1966), American baseball coach and former catcher
- Hans Hartleb (born 1951), German skier
- Hans Hartleb (director) (1910–?), German opera director
- Rainer Hartleb (born 1944), German-Swedish director of documentary films
