= Kilpinen =

Kilpinen is a Finnish surname. Notable people with the surname include:

- Erkki Kilpinen (born 1948), Finnish Nordic combined skier
- Yrjö Kilpinen (1892–1959), Finnish composer
