= Anatoly Zaytsev =

Anatoly Zaytsev may refer to:

- Anatoly Zaytsev (skier)
- Anatoly Zaytsev (politician)
