= Mitsuyo =

- Gender: Both

Origin
- Origin: Japanese
- Meaning: Different meanings depending on the kanji used

Mitsuyo (written: 美鶴代, 美津代 or 満代) is a feminine Japanese given name. Notable people with the name include:

- Mitsuyo Kusano (草野 満代; born 1967), Japanese television presenter
- Mitsuyo Nagumo (南雲 美津代; born 1951), Japanese alpine skier
- Mitsuyo Nemoto (根本 美鶴代; born 1958), Japanese actress and singer
- Mitsuyo Kakuta (角田 光代; born 1967), Japanese author

Mitsuyo (written: 光世) is also a masculine Japanese given name. Notable people with the name include:

- Mitsuyo Maeda (前田 光世; 1878–1941), Japanese judoka
- Mitsuyo Seo (瀬尾 光世; 1911–2010), Japanese animator, screenwriter and film director
