= Hefti =

Hefti is a surname, and may refer to:

- Beat Hefti (born 1978), Swiss bobsledder
- David Philip Hefti (born 1975), Swiss composer and conductor
- Marianne Hefti (born 1953), Swiss alpine skier
- Neal Hefti (1922–2008), American jazz trumpeter, composer, tune writer, and arranger
- Nias Hefti (born 1999), Swiss footballer
- Silvan Hefti (born 1997), Swiss footballer

== See also ==
- Hefty (disambiguation)
