= Nina Ignatyeva =

Russian luger (born 1948)

Personal information
- Nationality: Russian
- Born: 9 May 1948 (age 77); Leningrad, Russian SFSR, Soviet Union

Sport
- Sport: Luge

Nina Ignatyeva (born 9 May 1948) is a Russian luger. She competed in the women's singles event at the 1972 Winter Olympics.
