= Wojciech Kubik =

Polish luger (1953–1992)

Personal information
- Nationality: Polish
- Born: 13 January 1953; Bystra Śląska, Poland
- Died: 16 April 1992 (aged 39); Wieliczka, Poland

Sport
- Sport: Luge

Wojciech Kubik (13 January 1953 – 16 April 1992) was a Polish luger. He competed in the men's doubles event at the 1972 Winter Olympics.
