= Jaroslav Svoboda (skier) =

Czech Nordic combined skier

Personal information
- Nationality: Czech
- Born: 21 May 1944 (age 80); Eisenbrod, Reichsgau Sudetenland, Germany

Sport
- Sport: Nordic combined

Jaroslav Svoboda (born 21 May 1944) is a Czech former skier. He competed in the Nordic combined event at the 1972 Winter Olympics where he placed 28th.
