= Libor Foltman =

Czech Nordic combined skier

Personal information
- Nationality: Czech
- Born: 11 July 1948 (age 76); Trutnov, Czechoslovakia

Sport
- Sport: Nordic combined

Libor Foltman (born 11 July 1948) is a Czech former skier. He competed in the Nordic combined event at the 1972 Winter Olympics.
