= Hefty (disambiguation) =

Hefty is a registered trademark of Pactiv Corporation.

Hefty may also refer to:

- Fred K. Hefty (1871–1925), an American politician
- Friedrich Hefty (1894–1965), Austro-Hungarian aviator
- Hefty Records, an independent record label
- Hefty Smurf, a male fictional character from The Smurfs

== See also ==
- Hefti
