= Bob Kendall =

American Nordic combined skier

Personal information
- Born: July 23, 1947 (age 79) Augusta, Maine, United States

Sport
- Sport: Nordic combined

Bob Kendall (born July 23, 1947) is an American skier. He competed in the Nordic combined event at the 1972 Winter Olympics.
