= Leif Haugen =

Norwegian cross-country skier

Personal information
- Born: 22 September 1917 Lillehammer, Norway
- Died: 26 February 2001 (aged 83)

Sport
- Country: Norway
- Sport: Cross-country skiing

Leif Haugen (22 September 1917 – 26 February 2001) was a Norwegian cross-country skier.

He was born in Lillehammer, and represented the club Lillehammer SK. He competed in cross-country skiing at the 1948 Winter Olympics.

== Cross-country skiing results ==
=== Olympic Games ===
Year	Age	18 km	50 km	4 × 10 km relay
1948	30	—	DNF	—
