= Peggy Frair =

American luger

Personal information
- Nationality: American
- Born: July 26, 1950 (age 74); New York, New York, Japan

Sport
- Sport: Luge

Peggy Frair (born July 26, 1950) is an American luger. She competed in the women's singles event at the 1972 Winter Olympics.
