= Halina Kanasz =

Polish luger

Medal record

Luge

European Championships
Silver medal – second place	1974 Imst	Women's singles
Bronze medal – third place	1975 Olang	Women's singles

Halina Kanasz (born 30 January 1953 in Henrykowo) is a Polish luger who competed during the 1970s. She won two medals in the women's singles event at the FIL European Luge Championships with a silver in 1974 and a bronze in 1975.

Kanasz also competed in the women's singles event at the 1972 Winter Olympics in Sapporo, finishing tied for sixth with a fellow Pole, Wiesława Martyka, and at the 1976 Winter Olympics in Innsbruck finished at 14th.
