= West Germany at the 1972 Winter Olympics =

- Flag of Germany
- IOC code: FRG (GER used at these Games)
- NOC: National Olympic Committee for Germany

in Sapporo, Japan 3 February 1972 – 13 February 1972
- Competitors: 78 (62 men, 16 women) in 10 sports
- Flag bearer: Walter Demel (cross-country skiing)
- Medals Ranked 6th: Gold 3 Silver 1 Bronze 1 Total 5

Winter Olympics appearances (overview)
- 1968; 1972; 1976; 1980; 1984; 1988

Other related appearances
- Germany (1928–1936, 1952, 1992–); United Team of Germany (1956–1964)

West Germany (Federal Republic of Germany) competed at the 1972 Winter Olympics in Sapporo, Japan.

== Medalists ==
Medal	Name	Sport	Event
Gold	Wolfgang Zimmerer; Peter Utzschneider	Bobsleigh	Two-man
Gold	Erhard Keller	Speed skating	Men's 500m
Gold	Monika Pflug	Speed skating	Women's 1000m
Silver	Horst Floth; Pepi Bader	Bobsleigh	Two-man
Bronze	Wolfgang Zimmerer; Stefan Gaisreiter; Walter Steinbauer; Peter Utzschneider	Bobsleigh	Four-man

== Alpine skiing ==
Men

Athlete	Event	Race 1		Race 2		Total	
Athlete	Event	Time	Rank	Time	Rank	Time	Rank
Willi Lesch	Downhill					1:56.67	29
Alfred Hagn	Downhill					1:56.04	27
Franz Vogler	Downhill					1:55.50	24
Hans-Jörg Schlager	Downhill					1:55.05	18
Sepp Heckelmiller	Giant Slalom	DNF	–	–	–	DNF	–
Max Rieger	Giant Slalom	1:33.86	14	1:38.08	5	3:11.94	6
Christian Neureuther	Giant Slalom	1:33.24	6	DNF	–	DNF	–
Alfred Hagn	Giant Slalom	1:31.78	2	1:39.38	11	3:11.16	4

Men's slalom

Athlete	Classification		Final					
Athlete	Time	Rank	Time 1	Rank	Time 2	Rank	Total	Rank
Hans-Jörg Schlager	1:43.30	1	56.56	6	DNF	–	DNF	–
Max Rieger	bye		DNF	–	–	–	DNF	–
Christian Neureuther	bye		58.42	18	54.48	5	1:52.90	11
Alfred Hagn	bye		56.64	7	DNF	–	DNF	–

Women

Athlete	Event	Race 1		Race 2		Total	
Athlete	Event	Time	Rank	Time	Rank	Time	Rank
Pamela Behr	Downhill					1:44.22	36
Traudl Treichl	Downhill					1:40.62	13
Rosi Mittermaier	Downhill					1:39.32	6
Rosi Speiser	Downhill					1:39.10	5
Pamela Behr	Giant Slalom					1:35.87	25
Rosi Mittermaier	Giant Slalom					1:33.39	12
Traudl Treichl	Giant Slalom					1:33.08	9
Rosi Speiser	Giant Slalom					1:32.56	5
Rosi Speiser	Slalom	DNF	–	–	–	DNF	–
Traudl Treichl	Slalom	DNF	–	–	–	DNF	–
Pamela Behr	Slalom	47.57	8	46.70	4	1:34.27	6
Rosi Mittermaier	Slalom	47.27	7	53.90	19	1:41.17	18

== Biathlon ==
Men

Event	Athlete	Time	Penalties	Adjusted time ^{1}	Rank
20 km	Theo Merkel	1'19:58.17	11	1'30:58.17	50
20 km	Josef Niedermeier	1'21:26.44	8	1'29:26.44	46

^{1}One minute added per close miss (a hit in the outer ring), two minutes added per complete miss.

== Bobsleigh ==
Sled	Athletes	Event	Run 1		Run 2		Run 3		Run 4		Total	
Sled	Athletes	Event	Time	Rank	Time	Rank	Time	Rank	Time	Rank	Time	Rank
FRG-1	Horst Floth; Pepi Bader	Two-man	1:16.04	5	1:15.38	4	1:14.35	6	1:13.07	1	4:58.84	2nd place, silver medalist(s)
FRG-2	Wolfgang Zimmerer; Peter Utzschneider	Two-man	1:14.81	1	1:14.56	1	1:13.51	1	1:14.19	4	4:57.07	1st place, gold medalist(s)

Sled	Athletes	Event	Run 1		Run 2		Run 3		Run 4		Total	
Sled	Athletes	Event	Time	Rank	Time	Rank	Time	Rank	Time	Rank	Time	Rank
FRG-1	Wolfgang Zimmerer; Stefan Gaisreiter; Walter Steinbauer; Peter Utzschneider	Four-man	1:11.18	3	1:11.75	3	1:10.30	4	1:10.69	2	4:43.92	3rd place, bronze medalist(s)
FRG-2	Horst Floth; Donat Ertel; Walter Gillik; Pepi Bader	Four-man	1:10.83	2	1:11.88	4	1:11.06	6	1:11.32	7	4:45.09	5

== Cross-country skiing ==
Men

Event	Athlete	Race	
Event	Athlete	Time	Rank
15 km	Franz Betz	49:00.41	36
15 km	Hartmut Döpp	48:46.08	32
15 km	Gerhard Gehring	47:33.78	22
15 km	Walter Demel	46:17.36	7
30 km	Edgar Eckert	1'45:38.51	38
30 km	Hartmut Döpp	1'44:51.05	35
30 km	Gerhard Gehring	1'39:44.47	10
30 km	Walter Demel	1'37:45.53	5
50 km	Edgar Eckert	3'00:08.32	31
50 km	Walter Demel	2'44:32.67	5

Men's 4 × 10 km relay

Athletes	Race	
Athletes	Time	Rank
Franz Betz; Urban Hettich; Hartmut Döpp; Walter Demel	2'10:42.85	7

Women

Event	Athlete	Race	
Event	Athlete	Time	Rank
5 km	Monika Mrklas	17:57.40	24
5 km	Michaela Endler	17:32.56	11
10 km	Monika Mrklas	DNF	–
10 km	Ingrid Rothfuß	38:03.69	32
10 km	Michaela Endler	36:38.05	17

Women's 3 × 5 km relay

Athletes	Race	
Athletes	Time	Rank
Monika Mrklas; Ingrid Rothfuß; Michaela Endler	50:25.61	4

== Figure skating ==
Women

Athlete	CF	FS	Points	Places	Rank
Isabel de Navarre	16	14	2340.0	128	14

Pairs

Athletes	SP	FS	Points	Places	Rank
Corinne Halke; Eberhard Rausch	10	10	381.1	87	10
Almut Lehmann; Herbert Wiesinger	5	6	399.8	52	5

== Ice hockey ==
=== First round ===
Winners (in bold) entered the Medal Round. Other teams played a consolation round for 7th-11th places.

Team 1	Score	Team 2
**Poland**	4–0	West Germany

=== Consolation Round ===
Rank	Team	Pld	W	L	T	GF	GA	Pts
**7**	West Germany	4	3	1	0	22	10	**6**
**8**	Norway	4	3	1	0	16	14	**6**
**9**	Japan	4	2	1	1	17	16	**5**
**10**	Switzerland	4	0	2	2	9	16	**2**
**11**	Yugoslavia	4	0	3	1	9	17	**1**

- West Germany 5-0 Switzerland
- West Germany 6-2 Yugoslavia
- West Germany 5-1 Norway
- Japan 7-6 West Germany
- **Team roster**

- Anton Kehle
- Heiko Antons
- Georg Kink
- Rainer Makatsch
- Otto Schneitberger
- Josef Völk
- Werner Modes
- Paul Langner
- Rudolf Thanner
- Karl-Heinz Egger
- Rainer Philipp
- Bernd Kuhn
- Reinhold Bauer
- Johann Eimannsberger
- Lorenz Funk
- Erich Kühnhackl
- Alois Schloder
- Anton Hofherr
- Hans Rothkirch
- Martin Wild

- Head coach: Gerhard Kießling

== Luge ==
Men

Athlete	Run 1		Run 2		Run 3		Run 4		Total	
Athlete	Time	Rank	Time	Rank	Time	Rank	Time	Rank	Time	Rank
Hans Wimmer	54.09	15	53.82	17	52.62	14	53.27	21	3:33.80	17
Wolfgang Winkler	54.07	14	53.53	14	52.66	15	52.82	15	3:33.08	15
Josef Fendt	53.03	5	52.73	5	52.25	9	52.02	7	3:30.03	6
Leonhard Nagenrauft	53.00	4	52.79	7	51.97	6	51.91	4	3:29.67	5

(Men's) Doubles

Athletes	Run 1		Run 2		Total	
Athletes	Time	Rank	Time	Rank	Time	Rank
Hans Brandner; Balthasar Schwarm	44.86	5	44.80	5	1:29.66	5
Stefan Hölzlwimmer; Hans Wimmer	45.61	11	45.31	9	1:30.92	11

Women

Athlete	Run 1		Run 2		Run 3		Run 4		Total	
Athlete	Time	Rank	Time	Rank	Time	Rank	Time	Rank	Time	Rank
Gisela Otto	47.04	17	46.78	16	46.73	19	45.99	15	3:06.54	18
Christa Schmuck	45.98	10	46.01	8	45.99	12	45.21	10	3:03.19	10
Elisabeth Demleitner	45.45	5	45.62	4	45.08	4	44.65	4	3:00.80	4

== Nordic combined ==
Events:

- normal hill ski jumping (Three jumps, best two counted and shown here.)
- 15 km cross-country skiing

Athlete	Event	Ski Jumping				Cross-country			Total	
Athlete	Event	Distance 1	Distance 2	Points	Rank	Time	Points	Rank	Points	Rank
Urban Hettich	Individual	70.0	66.5	152.1	32	49:00.4	214.675	2	366.775	20
Alfred Winkler	Individual	71.5	72.5	175.6	20	52:41.5	181.510	32	357.110	25
Franz Keller	Individual	65.5	68.5	154.0	31	52:32.5	182.860	30	336.860	33
Ralph Pöhland	Individual	73.0	71.5	174.8	22	49:55.6	206.395	5	381.195	10

== Ski jumping ==
Athlete	Event	Jump 1		Jump 2		Total	
Athlete	Event	Distance	Points	Distance	Points	Points	Rank
Sepp Schwinghammer	Normal hill	68.5	89.8	68.5	90.3	180.1	49
Alfred Grosche	Normal hill	70.0	92.2	69.0	90.6	182.8	47
Günther Göllner	Normal hill	74.0	101.6	66.0	84.3	185.9	46
Alfred Grosche	Large hill	84.0 (fall)	44.6	77.5	75.0	119.6	52
Günther Göllner	Large hill	90.0	93.0	87.0	82.3	175.3	27

== Speed skating ==
Men

Event	Athlete	Race	
Event	Athlete	Time	Rank
500 m	Herbert Schwarz	43.03	31
500 m	Gerd Zimmermann	41.35	21
500 m	Hans Lichtenstern	40.55	10
500 m	Erhard Keller	39.44 OR	1st place, gold medalist(s)
1500 m	Herbert Schwarz	2:15.42	32
1500 m	Gerd Zimmermann	2:08.95	12
5000 m	Herbert Schwarz	8:26.03	27
5000 m	Gerd Zimmermann	7:41.16	9
10,000 m	Gerd Zimmermann	15:43.92	8

Women

Event	Athlete	Race	
Event	Athlete	Time	Rank
500 m	Monika Stützle	48.15	27
500 m	Paula Dufter	45.77	12
500 m	Monika Gawenus-Holzner-Pflug	44.75	5
1000 m	Paula Dufter	1:34.86	16
1000 m	Monika Gawenus-Holzner-Pflug	1:31.40 OR	1st place, gold medalist(s)
1500 m	Monika Stützle	2:37.15	31
1500 m	Paula Dufter	2:26.00	15
1500 m	Monika Gawenus-Holzner-Pflug	2:24.69	10
