= Janez Gorjanc =

Slovenian Nordic combined skier

Personal information
- Nationality: Slovenian
- Born: 8 April 1948 Kranj, Yugoslavia
- Died: February 2025

Sport
- Sport: Nordic combined

Janez Gorjanc (8 April 1948 – February 2025) was a Slovenian skier. He competed in the Nordic combined event at the 1972 Winter Olympics.
