= Raimo Lehtinen =

Finnish cross-country skier

Personal information
- Nationality: Finnish
- Born: 27 February 1946 (age 79) Kauhava, Finland

Sport
- Sport: Cross-country skiing

Raimo Lehtinen (born 27 February 1946) is a Finnish cross-country skier. He competed in the men's 30 km event at the 1972 Winter Olympics.

== Cross-country skiing results ==
=== Olympic Games ===
| Year | Age | 15 km | 30 km | 50 km | 4 × 10 km relay |
|---|---|---|---|---|---|
| 1972 | 25 | — | DNF | — | — |

=== World Championships ===
| Year | Age | 15 km | 30 km | 50 km | 4 × 10 km relay |
|---|---|---|---|---|---|
| 1974 | 27 | — | — | — | 4 |
