= Janusz Grzemowski =

Polish luger (1947–2005)

Personal information
- Nationality: Polish
- Born: 20 June 1947; Bielawa, Poland
- Died: 10 November 2005 (aged 58); Katowice, Poland

Sport
- Sport: Luge

Janusz Grzemowski (20 June 1947 – 10 November 2005) was a Polish luger. He competed in the men's singles event at the 1972 Winter Olympics.
