= Stephen Marsh (luger) =

British luger

Personal information
- Nationality: British
- Born: 2 June 1947 (age 77)

Sport
- Sport: Luge

Stephen Marsh (born 2 June 1947) is a British luger. He competed in the men's doubles event at the 1972 Winter Olympics.
