= Frank Jones Jr. =

American luger (born 1948)

Personal information
- Born: June 15, 1948 (age 78) Belmont, Massachusetts, United States

Sport
- Sport: Luge

Frank Jones Jr. (born June 15, 1948) is an American luger. He competed in the men's doubles event at the 1972 Winter Olympics.
