= Lillehammer SK =

Norwegian ski club

Logo.

Lillehammer Skiklub is a Norwegian skiing (Nordic and alpine) club from Lillehammer, Norway.

It was founded in 1883. It is best known for arranging Birkebeinerrennet together with Rena IL. It has been represented by several able sportspeople, such as Arne Rustadstuen, Leif Haugen, Oddmund Jensen, Anders Bakken, Per Knut Aaland, Tore Ruud Hofstad, Eistein Raabe, Jon Inge Kjørum, Berit Stuve, and Kjell Åsvestad.

It owned the ski jumping hill Balbergbakken together with Faaberg IL; the current hill in the city is Lysgårdsbakken.
