= Sven-Olof Israelsson =

Swedish skier (b. 1948)

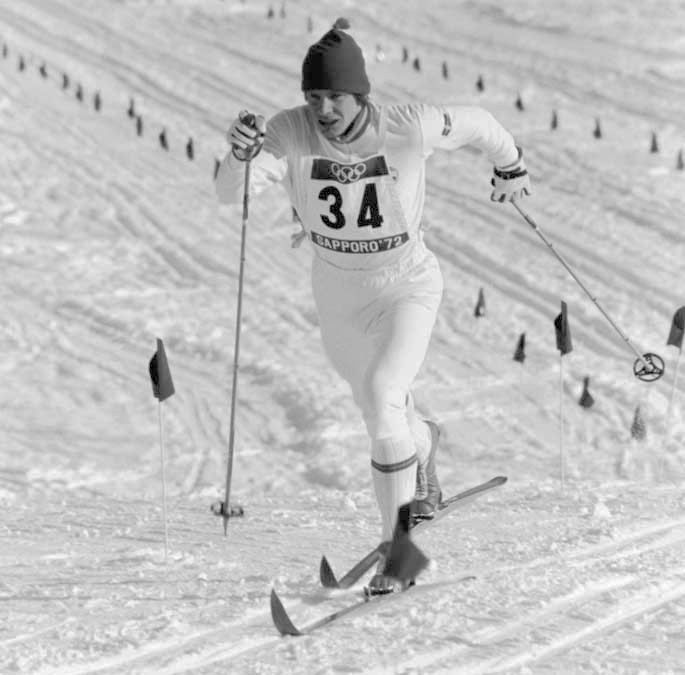
- Israelsson at the 1972 Olympics

Personal information
- Nationality: Swedish
- Born: 13 May 1948 (age 77); Dalarna, Sweden

Sport
- Sport: Nordic combined
- Club: Dala-Järna IK

Sven-Olof Israelsson (born 13 May 1948) is a Swedish skier. He competed in the Nordic combined event at the 1972 Winter Olympics.

His father Sven Israelsson won a bronze medal in the Nordic combined at the 1948 Olympics.
