= Karl-Heinz Luck =

East German Nordic combined skier (1945–2024)

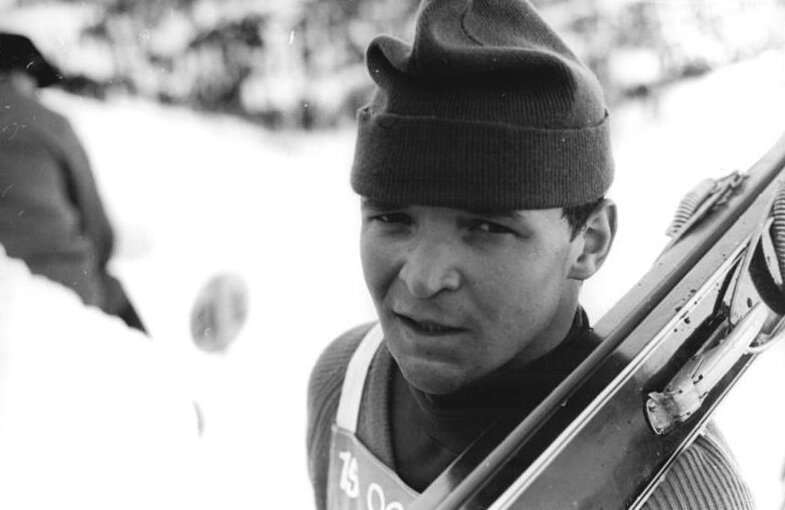

Medal record

Men's Nordic combined

Representing East Germany

Olympic Games
Bronze medal – third place	1972 Sapporo	Individual

Karl-Heinz Luck (28 January 1945 – 31 August 2024) was an East German Nordic combined skier. He wpm the bronze medal at the 1972 Winter Olympics in Sapporo in the individual event. He also won the Nordic combined event at the Holmenkollen ski festival in 1970. Luck also finished 6th in the Nordic combined individual event at the 1970 FIS Nordic World Ski Championships. He was born in Unterschönau, Thüringen and retired from international competition in 1973.
