= Kiyomi Ito =

Kiyomi Ito may refer to:

- Kiyomi Ito (speed skater) (伊藤 清美, born 1949), Japanese speed skater
- Kiyomi Itō (伊藤 清美), Japanese actress
