= Vladimir Dolganov =

Russian cross-country skier

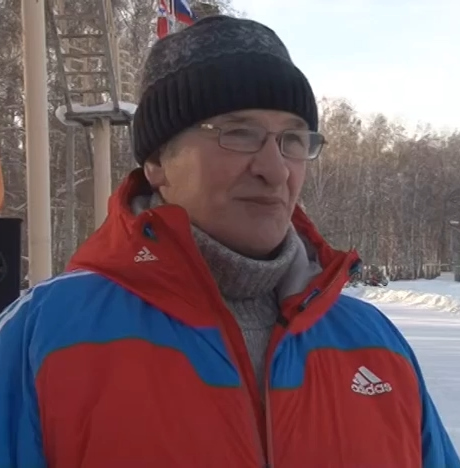
- Dolganov in 2018

Personal information
- Nationality: Russian
- Born: 15 March 1947 (age 78); Znamenka, Russian SFSR, Soviet Union

Sport
- Sport: Cross-country skiing

Vladimir Dolganov (born 15 March 1947) is a Russian cross-country skier. He competed in the men's 30 kilometre event at the 1972 Winter Olympics.
