= Leo Atzwanger =

Italian luger (born 1944)

Personal information
- Nationality: Italian
- Born: 25 April 1944 (age 81); Kiens, Italy

Sport
- Sport: Luge

Leo Atzwanger (born 25 April 1944) is an Italian luger. He competed in the men's singles event at the 1972 Winter Olympics.
