= Rupert Deen =

British luger (1938–2016)

Personal information
- Nationality: British
- Born: 14 November 1938 Berkhamsted, England
- Died: 30 December 2016 (aged 78) Gassin, France

Sport
- Sport: Luge

Rupert Deen (14 November 1938 – 30 December 2016) was a British luger. He competed in the men's singles event at the 1972 Winter Olympics.

Deen was also known for his considerable inherited wealth (coming down from his grandfather who had had business interests in the then Dutch East Indies, now Indonesia) and his flamboyant lifestyle.

Deen died on 30 December 2016, at the age of 78.
