= Bob Rock Jr. =

American luger (born 1949)

Personal information
- Born: October 17, 1949 (age 76) Missoula, Montana, United States

Sport
- Sport: Luge

Bob Rock Jr. (born October 17, 1949) is an American luger. He competed in the men's singles event at the 1972 Winter Olympics.
