= Jack Elder (luger) =

American luger (born 1941)

Personal information
- Born: August 9, 1941 (age 84) Seattle, Washington, United States

Sport
- Sport: Luge

Jack Elder (born August 9, 1941) is an American luger. He competed in the men's doubles event at the 1972 Winter Olympics.
