= Nina Shashkova =

Russian luger (born 1947)

Personal information
- Nationality: Russian
- Born: 11 June 1947 (age 77); Moscow, Russian SFSR, Soviet Union

Sport
- Sport: Luge

Nina Shashkova (born 11 June 1947) is a Russian luger. She competed in the women's singles event at the 1972 Winter Olympics.
