= Kazuo Araya =

Japanese Nordic combined skier

Personal information
- Nationality: Japanese
- Born: 2 January 1949 (age 76); Hokkaido, Japan

Sport
- Sport: Nordic combined

Kazuo Araya (born 2 January 1949) is a Japanese skier. He competed in the Nordic combined event at the 1972 Winter Olympics.
