= Satomi Koike =

Japanese speed skater (born 1950)

Personal information
- Nationality: Japanese
- Born: 19 October 1950 (age 74); Fujimi, Nagano, Japan

Sport
- Sport: Speed skating

Satomi Koike (小池 里美, Koike Satomi, born 19 October 1950) is a Japanese speed skater. She competed in two events at the 1972 Winter Olympics.
