= Terry O'Brien (luger) =

American luger (born 1943)

Personal information
- Nationality: American
- Born: July 28, 1943 (age 83) Portland, Maine, U.S.

Sport
- Sport: Luge

Terry O'Brien (born July 28, 1943) is an American luger. He competed at the 1972 Winter Olympics and the 1976 Winter Olympics.
