= Wiesława Martyka =

Polish luger

Personal information
- Nationality: Polish
- Born: 2 June 1949 (age 75); Katowice, Poland

Sport
- Sport: Luge

Wiesława Martyka (born 2 June 1949) is a Polish luger. She competed in the women's singles event at the 1972 Winter Olympics.
