= Marianne Hefti =

Swiss alpine skier (born 1953)

Marianne Hefti (born 29 May 1953 in Luchsingen) is a Swiss retired alpine skier who competed in the women's downhill at the 1972 Winter Olympics, finishing 12th.
