= Nobutaka Sasaki =

Japanese Nordic combined skier

Personal information
- Nationality: Japanese
- Born: 3 October 1947 (age 77); Hokkaido, Japan

Sport
- Sport: Nordic combined

Nobutaka Sasaki (born 3 October 1947) is a Japanese skier. He competed in the Nordic combined event at the 1972 Winter Olympics.
