= Daniel Claudon =

French biathlete (born 1943)

Personal information
- Nationality: French
- Born: 30 August 1943 (age 81); Remirmont, France

Sport
- Sport: Biathlon

Daniel Claudon (born 30 August 1943) is a French biathlete. He competed at the 1968 Winter Olympics and the 1972 Winter Olympics.
