= Harumi Imai =

Japanese cross-country skier (born 1952)

Personal information
- Nationality: Japanese
- Born: 1 January 1952 (age 73); Niigata, Japan

Sport
- Sport: Cross-country skiing

Harumi Imai (今井 春美, Imai Harumi, born 1 January 1952) is a Japanese cross-country skier. She competed in two events at the 1972 Winter Olympics.
