= Motoharu Matsumura =

Japanese cross-country skier (born 1946)

Personal information
- Nationality: Japanese
- Born: 20 December 1946 (age 78); Nagano, Japan

Sport
- Sport: Cross-country skiing

Motoharu Matsumura (松村 元治, Matsumura Motoharu, born 20 December 1946) is a Japanese cross-country skier. He competed in the men's 15 kilometre event at the 1972 Winter Olympics.
