= Susumu Esashika =

Japanese bobsledder (born 1937)

Personal information
- Nationality: Japanese
- Born: 3 June 1937 (age 87); Hokkaido, Japan

Sport
- Sport: Bobsleigh

Susumu Esashika (江刺家 進, Esashika Susumu, born 3 June 1937) is a Japanese bobsledder. He competed at the 1972 Winter Olympics, and the 1976 Winter Olympics.
