= Rikio Sato =

Japanese bobsledder (born 1947)

Personal information
- Nationality: Japanese
- Born: 23 June 1947 (age 77); Iwate, Japan

Sport
- Sport: Bobsleigh

Rikio Sato (佐藤 力夫, Satō Rikio, born 23 June 1947) is a Japanese bobsledder. He competed at the 1972 Winter Olympics and the 1976 Winter Olympics.
