= Hiroko Takahashi (cross-country skier) =

Japanese cross-country skier (born 1942)

Personal information
- Nationality: Japanese
- Born: 1 May 1942 (age 82); Yuzawa, Akita, Japan

Sport
- Sport: Cross-country skiing

Hiroko Takahashi (高橋 弘子, Takahashi Hiroko, born 1 May 1942) is a Japanese cross-country skier. She competed in three events at the 1972 Winter Olympics.
