= Teyck Weed =

American Nordic combined skier (born 1949)

Teyck Weed (born April 15, 1949) is a retired American Nordic combined skier who competed in the 1972 Winter Olympics.
