= Kazumi Abe =

Japanese bobsledder (born 1947)

Personal information
- Nationality: Japanese
- Born: 11 June 1947 (age 77)
- Height: 1.78 m (5 ft 10 in)
- Weight: 67 kg (148 lb)

Sport
- Sport: Bobsleigh

Kazumi Abe (阿部 一視, Abe Kazumi, born 11 June 1947) is a Japanese bobsledder. He competed in the 1972 and 1976 Winter Olympics.
