= Paula Dufter =

German speed skater

Personal information
- Nationality: German
- Born: 29 August 1950 (age 74); Inzell, West Germany

Sport
- Sport: Speed skating

Paula Dufter (born 29 August 1950) is a German speed skater. She competed at the 1968 Winter Olympics and the 1972 Winter Olympics.
