= Hiroko Shibuya =

Japanese luger (born 1947)

Personal information
- Nationality: Japanese
- Born: 15 June 1947 (age 77); Hokkaido, Japan

Sport
- Sport: Luge

Hiroko Shibuya (born 15 June 1947) is a Japanese luger. She competed in the women's singles event at the 1972 Winter Olympics.
