= Alain Roy =

French bobsledder

Personal information
- Nationality: French
- Born: 7 May 1951 (age 73)

Sport
- Sport: Bobsleigh

Alain Roy (born 7 May 1951) is a French bobsledder. He competed at the 1972 Winter Olympics and the 1976 Winter Olympics.
