= Miyako Kawase =

Japanese luger (born 1951)

Personal information
- Nationality: Japanese
- Born: 13 December 1951 (age 73); Tokyo, Japan

Sport
- Sport: Luge

Miyako Kawase (born 13 December 1951) is a Japanese luger. She competed in the women's singles event at the 1972 Winter Olympics.
