= Satoru Arai =

Japanese luger (born 1947)

Personal information
- Nationality: Japanese
- Born: 29 June 1947 (age 77); Tochigi, Japan

Sport
- Sport: Luge

Satoru Arai (born 29 June 1947) is a Japanese luger. He competed in the men's singles and doubles events at the 1972 Winter Olympics.
