= Erkki Kilpinen =

Finnish Nordic combined skier

Erkki Kilpinen (born 20 June 1948) was a Finnish Nordic combined skier who competed in the early 1970s. He finished fourth in the Nordic combined event at the 1972 Winter Olympics in Sapporo.
