= Edgar Eckert =

German cross-country skier (born 1948)

Personal information
- Nationality: German
- Born: 13 January 1948 (age 77); Neubau, Germany

Sport
- Sport: Cross-country skiing

Edgar Eckert (born 13 January 1948) is a German cross-country skier. He competed in the men's 30 kilometre event at the 1972 Winter Olympics.
