= Anatoly Zaytsev (skier) =

Soviet Nordic combined skier

Personal information
- Nationality: Soviet
- Born: 9 January 1947 (age 78); Tomsk, Russian SFSR, Soviet Union

Sport
- Sport: Nordic combined

Anatoly Zaytsev (born 9 January 1947) is a Soviet skier. He competed in the Nordic combined event at the 1972 Winter Olympics.
