= René Arpin =

French biathlete (born 1943)

Personal information
- Nationality: French
- Born: 7 July 1943 (age 81)

Sport
- Sport: Biathlon

René Arpin (born 7 July 1943) is a French biathlete. He competed at the 1972 Winter Olympics and the 1976 Winter Olympics.
