= Masatoshi Kobayashi =

Japanese luger (1948–2003)

Personal information
- Nationality: Japanese
- Born: 8 October 1948; Niigata, Japan
- Died: 20 February 2003 (aged 54)

Sport
- Sport: Luge

Masatoshi Kobayashi (8 October 1948 – 20 February 2003) was a Japanese luger. He competed in the men's singles and doubles events at the 1972 Winter Olympics.
