= Tomio Okamura (cross-country skier) =

Japanese cross-country skier (born 1948)

Personal information
- Nationality: Japanese
- Born: 12 August 1948 (age 77) Nagano, Japan

Sport
- Sport: Cross-country skiing

Tomio Okamura (岡村 富雄, Okamura Tomio; born 12 August 1948) is a Japanese cross-country skier. He competed in the men's 30 kilometre event at the 1972 Winter Olympics.
