= Gilbert Faure =

French cross-country skier (born 1943)

Personal information
- Nationality: French
- Born: 25 December 1943 (age 81)

Sport
- Sport: Cross-country skiing

Gilbert Faure (born 25 December 1943) is a French cross-country skier. He competed in the men's 30 kilometre event at the 1972 Winter Olympics.
