= Hans Wimmer (luger) =

German luger (born 1947)

Personal information
- Nationality: German
- Born: 20 November 1947 (age 77); Berchtesgaden, Germany

Sport
- Sport: Luge

Hans Wimmer (born 20 November 1947) is a German luger. He competed in the men's singles and doubles events at the 1972 Winter Olympics.
