= Marie-Theres Nadig =

Swiss alpine skier

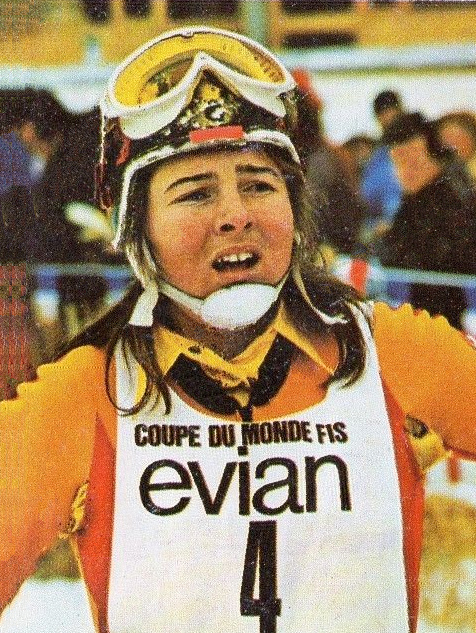
- Marie-Thérèse Nadig c. 1973

Personal information
- Born: 8 March 1954 (age 72) Flums, Switzerland
- Height: 1.65 m (5 ft 5 in)

Skiing career
- Sport: Alpine skiing
- Club: Skiclub Flumserberg, Flums
- Retired: 1981
- Disciplines: Speed events, giant slalom
- World Cup debut: 1970

Olympics
- Teams: 3
- Medals: 3 (2 gold)

World Championships
- Teams: 5
- Medals: 3 (2 gold)

World Cup
- Seasons: 12
- Wins: 24
- Podiums: 67
- Overall titles: 1
- Discipline titles: 3
Medal record
Representing Switzerland
Olympic Games
World Cup race podiums
Event	1st	2nd	3rd
Giant slalom	6	3	7
Downhill	13	9	13
Combined	5	0	1
Total	24	12	21
International competitions
Event	1st	2nd	3rd
Olympic Games	2	0	1
World Championships	2	0	1
Total	4	0	2
Gold medal – first place	1972 Sapporo	Downhill
Gold medal – first place	1972 Sapporo	Giant slalom
Bronze medal – third place	1980 Lake Placid	Downhill

Marie-Thérèse Nadig (born 8 March 1954) is a retired Swiss alpine skier.

== Biography ==
Aged 17, she won gold medals in the downhill and giant slalom events at the 1972 Winter Olympics. During her career, Nadig won 24 world cup races and had 57 podium finishes. At the 1980 Winter Olympics, she was third in the downhill event. After retiring from competitions, between 1999 and 2005 she worked as a national coach.

== Career ==
Nadig won her first major competition in 1970, the giant slalom at the Swiss Junior Championships. She finished sixth in the downhill at the world cup in 1971, and second in 1972. The same year, she won two Olympic gold medals, beating the favorite Annemarie Moser-Pröll and becoming the Swiss Sportswoman of the Year. She also took part in the slalom, but failed to finish.

After a few unsuccessful years, Nadig won two downhill events at the 1975 World Cup season. She competed in the slalom and giant slalom at the 1976 Olympics, but failed to achieve a podium. She recovered in 1977 by winning the downhill and the combined world cup events.

The peak of her career was between 1979 and 1981: in two years she won 19 world cup events; she won the downhill world cup in 1979–80 and 1980–81 and the overall world cup in 1980–81. However, at the 1980 Olympics, she earned only a bronze in the downhill and failed to finish the slalom and giant slalom.

== Retirement from skiing ==
Nadig retired in 1981 with a world cup tally of 24 wins and 57 podium finishes. She ran a sports store in Switzerland and later a hotel and as a ski school. Between 1999 and 2005 she worked with the Swiss national teams. The 2004/05 season was the worst ever for the Swiss women ski racers since the introduction of the World Cup. After the team failed to win a medal at the 2005 World Championships, Nadig was let go in March 2005. She finally ended her coaching career in October 2005.

Awards
Preceded by Meta Antenen	Swiss Sportswoman of the Year; 1972	Succeeded by Karin Iten
