= Patrick Parisot (bobsleigh) =

French bobsledder (born 1947)

Personal information
- Nationality: French
- Born: 23 February 1947
- Died: 15 June 2021 (aged 74)

Sport
- Sport: Bobsleigh

Patrick Parisot (23 February 1947 – 15 June 2021) was a French bobsledder. He competed in the two-man and the four man events at the 1972 Winter Olympics.
