= Gisela Otto =

German luger (born 1951)

Personal information
- Nationality: German
- Born: 23 February 1951 (age 74); Bayreuth, West Germany

Sport
- Sport: Luge

Gisela Otto (born 23 February 1951) is a German luger. She competed in the women's singles event at the 1972 Winter Olympics.
