= Masako Eguchi =

Japanese luger (born 1949)

Personal information
- Nationality: Japanese
- Born: 5 December 1949 (age 75); Hokkaido, Japan

Sport
- Sport: Luge

Masako Eguchi (born 5 December 1949) is a Japanese luger. He competed in the men's singles and doubles events at the 1972 Winter Olympics.
