= Pierre Larchier =

French luger (born 1947)

Personal information
- Nationality: French
- Born: 15 July 1947 (age 77); Lyon, France

Sport
- Sport: Luge

Pierre Larchier (born 15 July 1947) is a French luger. He competed in the men's singles event at the 1972 Winter Olympics.
