= Emiko Taguchi =

Japanese speed skater

Personal information
- Nationality: Japanese
- Born: 1 April 1951 (age 73); Ikeda, Hokkaido, Japan

Sport
- Sport: Speed skating

Emiko Taguchi (田口 恵美子, Taguchi Emiko, born 1 April 1951) is a Japanese speed skater. She competed in two events at the 1972 Winter Olympics.
