= Robert Berkley Jr. =

American luger (born 1948)

Personal information
- Nationality: American
- Born: September 23, 1948 (age 77) Denver, Colorado, United States

Sport
- Sport: Luge

Robert Berkley Jr. (born September 23, 1948) is an American luger. He competed at the 1972 Winter Olympics and the 1976 Winter Olympics.
