= Hans Hartleb =

German Nordic combined skier

Personal information
- Nationality: German
- Born: 6 November 1951 (age 73); Thuringia, East Germany

Sport
- Sport: Nordic combined

Hans Hartleb (born 6 November 1951) is a German skier. He competed in the Nordic combined event at the 1972 Winter Olympics.
