= Tokiko Ozeki =

Japanese cross-country skier (born 1950)

Personal information
- Nationality: Japanese
- Born: 15 December 1950 (age 74); Hokkaido, Japan

Sport
- Sport: Cross-country skiing

Tokiko Ozeki (大関 時子, Ōzeki Tokiko, born 15 December 1950) is a Japanese cross-country skier. She competed in three events at the 1972 Winter Olympics.
