= Johs Harviken =

Norwegian cross-country skier

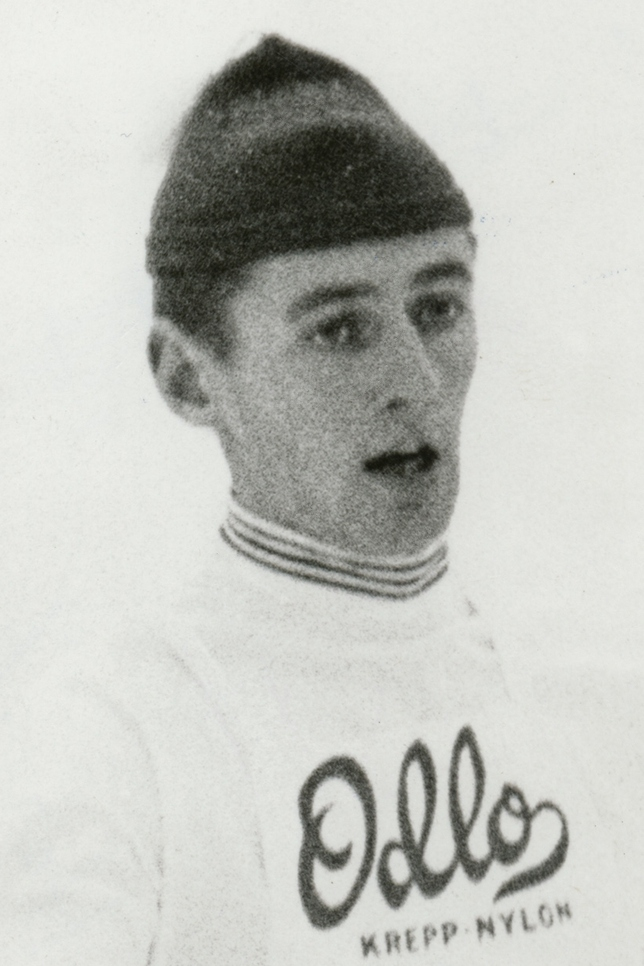
- Harviken in 1969

Personal information
- Born: 6 April 1943 (age 83) Elverum, Norway
- Height: 185 cm (6 ft 1 in)
- Weight: 75 kg (165 lb)

Sport
- Sport: Cross-country skiing
- Club: Hernes IL
Medal record
Men's cross-country skiing
Representing Norway
Olympic Games
Silver medal – second place	1972 Sapporo	4 × 10 km relay
Bronze medal – third place	1972 Sapporo	30 km

Johannes "Johs" Harviken (born 6 April 1943) is a retired Norwegian cross-country skier. He won two medals at the 1972 Winter Olympics in Sapporo with a silver in the 4 × 10 km relay and a bronze in the 30 km.

Harviken had his first skiing success when he placed third over 15 km at the 1967 national championships. Later he won the national 30 km title in 1970 and finished second in the 50 km race at the 1969 Holmenkollen ski festival. He retired after failing to qualify for the 1976 Winter Olympics and later worked as a carpenter.

== Cross-country skiing results ==
All results are sourced from the International Ski Federation (FIS).

=== Olympic Games ===
- 2 medals – (1 silver, 1 bronze)

Year	Age	15 km	30 km	50 km	4 × 10 km relay
1972	28	—	Bronze	—	Silver
