= Shozo Sasaki =

Japanese biathlete (born 1944)

Personal information
- Nationality: Japanese
- Born: 25 January 1944 (age 81); Akita, Japan

Sport
- Sport: Biathlon

Shozo Sasaki (佐々木 昭三, Sasaki Shōzō, born 25 January 1944) is a Japanese biathlete. He competed in the 20 km individual event at the 1972 Winter Olympics.
