= Yuko Otaka =

Japanese luger (born 1950)

Personal information
- Nationality: Japanese
- Born: 23 May 1950 (age 74); Hokkaido, Japan

Sport
- Sport: Luge

Yuko Otaka (born 23 May 1950) is a Japanese luger. She competed in the women's singles event at the 1972 Winter Olympics.
