= Hideko Saito =

Japanese cross-country skier (born 1950)

Personal information
- Nationality: Japanese
- Born: 22 April 1950 (age 74); Miyagi, Japan

Sport
- Sport: Cross-country skiing

Hideko Saito (斎藤 ひで子, Saitō Hideko, born 29 April 1950) is a Japanese cross-country skier. She competed in two events at the 1972 Winter Olympics.
