= Ingrid Rothfuß =

German cross-country skier (born 1948)

Ingrid Rothfuß (born 10 October 1948) is a German former cross-country skier who competed in the 1972 Winter Olympics.

== Cross-country skiing results ==
All results are sourced from the International Ski Federation (FIS).

=== Olympic Games ===
Year	Age	5 km	10 km	3 × 5 km relay
1972	23	DNS	32	4

=== World Championships ===
Year	Age	5 km	10 km	3 × 5 km relay
1970	21	—	—	6
