= Kazuo Sasakubo =

Japanese biathlete (born 1946)

Personal information
- Nationality: Japanese
- Born: 2 December 1946 (age 78); Hokkaido, Japan

Sport
- Sport: Biathlon

Kazuo Sasakubo (born 5 December 1946) is a Japanese biathlete. He competed at the 1972 Winter Olympics and the 1976 Winter Olympics.
