= Seiji Kudo =

Japanese cross-country skier (born 1945)

Personal information
- Nationality: Japanese
- Born: 5 June 1945 (age 79); Hokkaido, Japan

Sport
- Sport: Cross-country skiing

Seiji Kudo (工藤 誠二, Kudō Seiji, born 5 June 1945) is a Japanese cross-country skier. He competed in the men's 30 kilometre event at the 1972 Winter Olympics.
