= Monika Stützle =

German speed skater

Personal information
- Nationality: German
- Born: 5 July 1953 (age 71); Munich, West Germany

Sport
- Sport: Speed skating

Monika Stützle (born 5 July 1953) is a German speed skater. She competed in two events at the 1972 Winter Olympics.
