= Kirsti Biermann =

Norwegian speed skater

Personal information
- Nationality: Norwegian
- Born: 2 August 1950 (age 74); Oslo
- Height: 172 cm (5 ft 8 in)

Sport
- Sport: Speed skating

Kirsti Biermann (born 2 August 1950) is a Norwegian speed skater, born in Oslo. She competed at the 1968 Winter Olympics in Grenoble, where she placed 8th in 500 m and 9th in 1000 m. She participated in four competitions at the 1972 Winter Olympics in Sapporo.

She is the sister of speed skater Tone Biermann.
