= Henning Weid =

Norwegian Nordic combined skier (born 1950)

Personal information
- Nationality: Norwegian
- Born: 28 October 1950 (age 75) Oslo

Sport
- Sport: Nordic combined skiing
- Club: Nydalens SK

Henning Weid (born 28 October 1950) is a Norwegian Nordic combined skier. He was born in Oslo and represented the club Nydalens Skiklub. He competed at the 1972 Winter Olympics in Sapporo, where he placed 19th.
