= Masahiko Otsue =

Japanese alpine skier (born 1946)

Personal information
- Nationality: Japanese
- Born: 14 October 1946 (age 78); Tottori, Japan

Sport
- Sport: Alpine skiing

Masahiko Otsue (born 14 October 1946) is a Japanese alpine skier. He competed in two events at the 1972 Winter Olympics.
