= Ryoko Onozawa =

Japanese speed skater (born 1951)

Personal information
- Nationality: Japanese
- Born: 1 January 1951 (age 75) Ikeda, Nagano, Japan

Sport
- Sport: Speed skating

Ryoko Onozawa (小野沢 良子, Onozawa Ryōko; born 1 January 1951), also written as Yoshiko Onozawa, is a Japanese speed skater. She competed in two events at the 1972 Winter Olympics.
