= Roland Jeannerod =

French cross-country skier (born 1945)

Personal information
- Nationality: French
- Born: 21 November 1945 (age 79)

Sport
- Sport: Cross-country skiing

Roland Jeannerod (born 21 November 1945) is a French cross-country skier. He competed at the 1972 Winter Olympics and the 1976 Winter Olympics.
