= Hartmut Döpp =

German cross-country skier (born 1947)

Personal information
- Nationality: German
- Born: 11 May 1947 (age 77); Winterberg, Germany

Sport
- Sport: Cross-country skiing

Hartmut Döpp (born 11 May 1947) is a German cross-country skier. He competed in the men's 15 kilometre event at the 1972 Winter Olympics.
