= Jean-Paul Vandel =

French cross-country skier (born 1951)

Personal information
- Nationality: French
- Born: 31 October 1951 (age 73)

Sport
- Sport: Cross-country skiing

Jean-Paul Vandel (born 31 October 1951) is a French cross-country skier. He competed at the 1972 Winter Olympics and the 1976 Winter Olympics.
