= Diane Pratte =

Canadian alpine skier (born 1953)

Diane Pratte (born 18 June 1953) is a Canadian former alpine skier who competed in the 1972 Winter Olympics.

Pratte's daughter, Brigitte Acton, is also an Olympic alpine skier.
