= Carolyne Oughton =

Canadian alpine skier (born 1952)

Carolyne Oughton (born 15 November 1952) is a Canadian former alpine skier who competed in the 1972 Winter Olympics.
