= Kjell Åsvestad =

Norwegian Nordic combined skier

Personal information
- Nationality: Norwegian
- Born: 4 January 1950 (age 75); Lillehammer, Norway

Sport
- Sport: Nordic combined skiing
- Club: Lillehammer SK

Kjell Åsvestad (born 4 January 1950) is a Norwegian Nordic combined skier.

He was born in Lillehammer, and represented the club Lillehammer SK. He competed at the 1972 Winter Olympics in Sapporo, where he placed 14th.
