= Daniel Cerisey =

French cross-country skier (born 1948)

Personal information
- Nationality: French
- Born: 21 October 1948 (age 76)

Sport
- Sport: Cross-country skiing

Daniel Cerisey (born 21 October 1948) is a French cross-country skier. He competed in the men's 15 kilometre event at the 1972 Winter Olympics.
