= Sandy Poulsen =

American alpine skier (born 1952)

Sandy Poulsen (born July 24, 1952 in San Francisco) is an American retired alpine skier who competed in the 1972 Winter Olympics.
