= Hideo Tanifuji =

Japanese cross-country skier (born 1949)

Personal information
- Nationality: Japanese
- Born: 19 April 1949 (age 75); Hokkaido, Japan

Sport
- Sport: Cross-country skiing

Hideo Tanifuji (谷藤 秀夫, Tanifuji Hideo, born 19 April 1949) is a Japanese cross-country skier. He competed in the men's 15 kilometre event at the 1972 Winter Olympics.
