= Rita Good =

Swiss alpine skier (born 1951)

Rita Good (born 4 June 1951 in Balm bei Günsberg) is a retired Swiss alpine skier who competed in the 1972 Winter Olympics. She is the sister of the Olympian Ernst Good.
