= Kunio Shibata =

Japanese cross-country skier (born 1948)

Personal information
- Nationality: Japanese
- Born: 15 June 1948 (age 76); Yamagata, Japan

Sport
- Sport: Cross-country skiing

Kunio Shibata (柴田 国男, Shibata Kunio, born 15 June 1948) is a Japanese cross-country skier. He competed in the men's 15 kilometre event at the 1972 Winter Olympics.
