= Stephen Sinding =

Norwegian luger (born 1951)

Personal information
- Born: 22 July 1951 (age 73); Oslo, Norway

Sport
- Sport: Luge

Stephen Otto Sinding (born 22 July 1951) is a Norwegian luger, born in Oslo. He competed in at the 1972 Winter Olympics in Sapporo, where he placed 22nd in singles, and 14th in doubles together with Christian Strøm.

He won a national title in single luge in 1974.
