= Christian Strøm =

Norwegian luger (born 1947)

Personal information
- Born: 14 June 1947 (age 77); Oslo, Norway

Sport
- Sport: Luge

Johan Christian Strøm (born 14 June 1947) is a Norwegian luger. He was born in Oslo, and is the brother of Rolf Greger Strøm. He competed in at the 1972 Winter Olympics in Sapporo, where he placed 14th in singles, and 14th in doubles together with Stephen Sinding.
