= Anne Brusletto =

Norwegian alpine skier (born 1951)

Personal information
- Nationality: Norwegian
- Born: 24 January 1951 (age 75) Geilo

Sport
- Sport: Alpine skiing

Anne Brusletto (born 24 January 1951) is a Norwegian alpine skier. She was born in Geilo. She participated at the 1972 Winter Olympics in Sapporo, where she competed in slalom and giant slalom.

She became Norwegian champion in giant slalom in 1970.
