= Conchita Puig =

Spanish alpine skier (born 1953)

Personal information
- Nationality: Spanish
- Born: 18 January 1953 (age 73)

Sport
- Sport: Alpine skiing

Conchita Puig (born 18 January 1953) is a Spanish skier. She competed in Alpine skiing at the 1972 Winter Olympics.
