= Kazuaki Ichikawa =

Japanese luger (born 1949)

Personal information
- Nationality: Japanese
- Born: 12 October 1949 (age 75); Hokkaido, Japan

Sport
- Sport: Luge

Kazuaki Ichikawa (born 12 October 1949) is a Japanese luger. He competed at the 1972 Winter Olympics and the 1976 Winter Olympics.
