= Svetlana Isakova (alpine skier) =

Soviet alpine skier (born 1952)

Personal information
- Nationality: Soviet
- Born: 18 February 1952 (age 74) Trostnikovyi, Monchegorsk, Murmansk region, Soviet Union

Sport
- Sport: Alpine skiing

Svetlana Isakova (born 18 February 1952) is a Soviet alpine skier. She competed in three events at the 1972 Winter Olympics.
