= Laurie Kreiner =

Canadian alpine skier (born 1954)

Laurie Kreiner (born 30 June 1954) is a Canadian former alpine skier who competed in the 1972 Winter Olympics and in the 1976 Winter Olympics. She is the older sister of olympic champion Kathy Kreiner.
