= Nina Merkulova =

Soviet skier (born 1945)

Personal information
- Nationality: Soviet
- Born: 8 December 1945 (age 80) Moscow, Russian SFSR, Soviet Union

Sport
- Sport: Alpine skiing

Nina Merkulova (born 8 December 1945) is a Soviet alpine skier. She competed at the 1968 Winter Olympics and the 1972 Winter Olympics.
