= Galina Shikhova =

Soviet alpine skier (born 1940)

Personal information
- Nationality: Soviet
- Born: 11 December 1940 Moscow, Soviet Union
- Died: 26 November 2018 (aged 77)

Sport
- Sport: Alpine skiing

Galina Shikhova (11 December 1940 – 26 November 2018) was a Soviet alpine skier. She competed in three events at the 1972 Winter Olympics.
