= Carol Blackwood =

British alpine skier (born 1953)

Personal information
- Nationality: British
- Born: 27 October 1953 (age 73)

Sport
- Sport: Alpine skiing
Medal record
Commonwealth Winter Games
Gold medal – first place	1970 St Moritz	Giant Slalom
Gold medal – first place	1970 St Moritz	Slalom

Carol Blackwood (born 27 October 1953) is a British alpine skier. She competed in three events at the 1972 Winter Olympics.
