= Lotta Sollander =

Swedish alpine skier (born 1953)

Personal information
- Born: 3 July 1953 (age 73) Frösön, Sweden

Sport
- Sport: Alpine skiing

Lotta Sollander (born 3 July 1953 in Frösön) is a Swedish former alpine skier, who competed in the 1972 Winter Olympics. She is the daughter of Stig Sollander.
