= Miyuki Katagiri =

Japanese alpine skier (born 1948)

Personal information
- Nationality: Japanese
- Born: 26 October 1948 (age 78) Nozawaonsen, Japan

Sport
- Sport: Alpine skiing

Miyuki Katagiri (片桐 美雪, Katagiri Miyuki; born 26 October 1948) is a Japanese alpine skier. She competed in three events at the 1972 Winter Olympics.
