= Toril Førland =

Norwegian alpine skier (born 1954)

Medal record

Women's alpine skiing

Representing Norway

World Championships
Bronze medal – third place	1972 Sapporo	Combined

Toril Førland (born 24 April 1954) is a retired Norwegian alpine skier.

She was born in Bærum, and represented the club Bærums SK. She participated at the 1972 Winter Olympics in Sapporo, where she competed in slalom, giant slalom and downhill.

She became Norwegian champion in slalom in 1971 and 1973, in giant slalom in 1973, in downhill in 1973 and 1974, and in alpine combined in 1971, 1972, 1973 and 1974.
