= Harue Okitsu =

Japanese alpine skier (born 1949)

Personal information
- Nationality: Japanese
- Born: 31 May 1949 (age 77) Kusatsu, Japan

Sport
- Sport: Alpine skiing

Harue Okitsu (沖津 はる江, Okitsu Harue; born 31 May 1949) is a Japanese alpine skier. She competed in three events at the 1972 Winter Olympics.
