= Gyri Sørensen =

Norwegian alpine skier (born 1951)

Personal information
- Nationality: Norwegian
- Born: 12 June 1951 (age 73); Oslo

Sport
- Sport: Alpine skiing

Gyri Tove Sørensen (born 12 June 1951) is a Norwegian alpine skier. She was born in Oslo. She participated at the 1972 Winter Olympics in Sapporo, where she competed in slalom, giant slalom and downhill.

She became Norwegian champion in slalom in 1972.
