= Rosi Speiser =

German alpine skier (born 1951)

Rosi Speiser (born 24 November 1951 in Bolsterlang) is a German former alpine skier who competed in the 1972 Winter Olympics. She finished fifth in the slalom event.
