= Emiko Okazaki =

Japanese alpine skier (born 1949)

Personal information
- Nationality: Japanese
- Born: 6 September 1949 (age 75); Hokkaido, Japan

Sport
- Sport: Alpine skiing

Emiko Okazaki (岡崎 恵美子, Okazaki Emiko, born 6 September 1949) is a Japanese alpine skier. She competed in three events at the 1972 Winter Olympics.
