= Karianne Christiansen =

Norwegian alpine skier (1949–1976)

Personal information
- Nationality: Norwegian
- Born: 24 February 1949; Tønsberg
- Died: 30 October 1976 (aged 27)

Sport
- Sport: Alpine skiing

Karianne Christiansen (24 February 1949 – 30 October 1976) was a Norwegian alpine skier. She was born in Tønsberg. She participated at the 1972 Winter Olympics in Sapporo, where she competed in slalom, giant slalom, and downhill.

She became Norwegian champion in slalom in 1968, 1969, and 1970, in giant slalom in 1969, 1971, and 1972, in downhill in 1970 and 1971, and in alpine combined in 1969 and 1970.
