= Mitsuyo Nagumo =

Japanese alpine skier (born 1951)

Personal information
- Nationality: Japanese
- Born: 28 November 1951 (age 73); Niigata, Japan

Sport
- Sport: Alpine skiing

Mitsuyo Nagumo (南雲 美津代, Nagumo Mitsuyo, born 28 November 1951) is a Japanese alpine skier. She competed in three events at the 1972 Winter Olympics.
