= 1944 in Norway =

- Centuries: 18th; 19th; 20th; 21st
- Decades: 1920s; 1930s; 1940s; 1950s; 1960s
- See also: List of years in Norway

Events in the year 1944 in Norway.

== Incumbents ==
- Government in Exile (in London)
  - Monarch – Haakon VII.
  - Prime Minister – Johan Nygaardsvold (Labour Party)
- German Military Governor
  - Reichskommissar in Norway – Josef Terboven
- German Puppet Government in Oslo
  - Minister-President – Vidkun Quisling (National Unification)

== Events ==
- 20 February – The ferry SF Hydro was sunk by the by the Special Operations Executive (SOE) in part of the allies,Norwegian heavy water sabotage
- 3 April – The German battleship Tirpitz was bombed and damaged by British carrier-borne aircraft at Kåfjorden in Alta Municipality.
- 20 April – The German ammunition transport Voorbode accidentally explodes in the harbour of the Western Norway city of Bergen, killing around 160 people and leaving some 5,000 homeless.
- 13-14 July - Operation Almenrausch which was a counter counter-resistance operation by the Wehrmacht and the Quisling government
- 3 October – Soviet troops cross the border to Norway.
- 4 October – British aircraft bomb the U-boat bunker "Bruno" and the dock area in Bergen harbour. As a result, 194 civilians, including 60 children, are killed.
- 25 October – the Petsamo–Kirkenes Offensive the Red Army liberates Kirkenes, the first town in Norway to be liberated.
- 28 October – Hitler orders the German forces to withdraw from northern Norway. The Germans were determined to leave nothing of value to the Soviets, as Hitler had ordered to leave the area devoid of people, shelter and supplies.
- 29 October – The Laksevåg borough of Bergen was bombed again. 52 civilians were killed.
- 10 November – The first Norwegian troops (300 men from the brigade in Scotland) arrive in Finnmark.
- 14 November - The German ship SS Westfalen sank off the coast of Marstrand, after hitting a naval mine
- 12 November – 29 Royal Air Force Avro Lancaster bombers sink the German battleship Tirpitz anchored in a fjord at Tromsø, with 12,000 lb Tallboy bombs.
- 27 November – The German prisoner ship Rigel is sunk off Sandnessjøen by Fleet Air Arm bombers in the deadliest ship disaster in Norwegian history.
- 31 December – Allied bombers tried to bomb the Victoria Terrasse building in Oslo, which was used as the Gestapo headquarters, but missed the target and instead hit civilian targets. 77 civilians are killed.
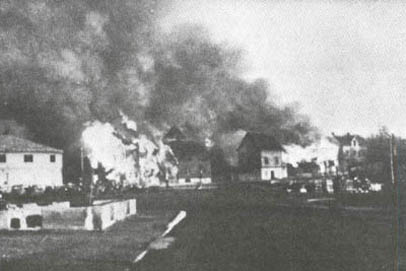
The town of Kirkenes burning after withdrawal of German forces, October 1944

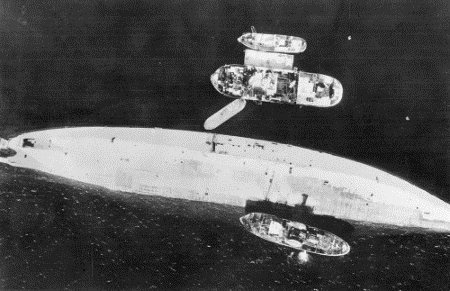
A reconnaissance photo of the capsized German battleship Tirpitz after the 12 November attack.

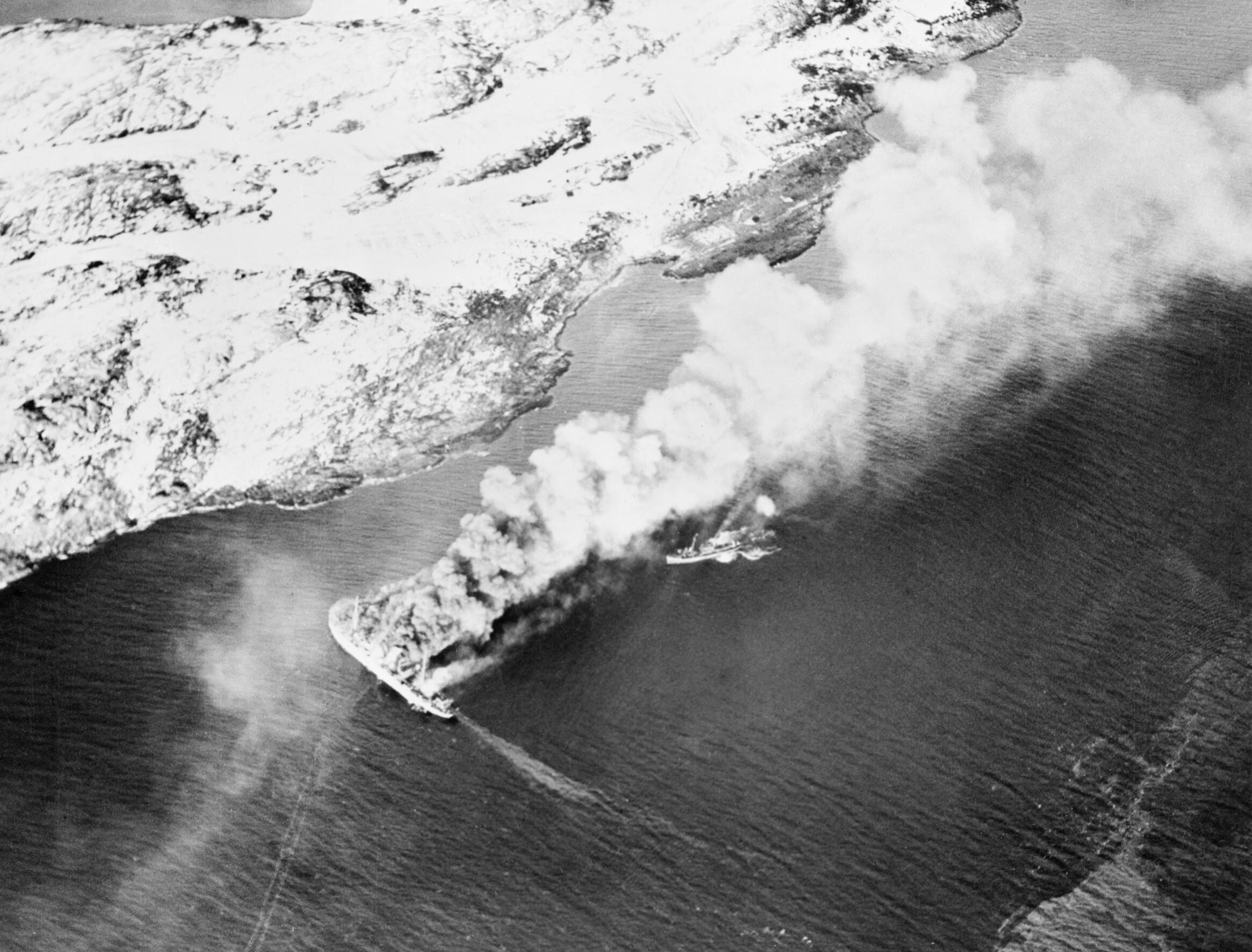
The prisoner ship Rigel under attack and on fire on 27 November.

== Popular culture ==
=== Music ===
- Song of Norway by Robert Wright and George Forrest, adapted from the music of Edvard Grieg

=== Film ===
- Brudekronen, directed by Walter Fyrst

== Notable births ==
=== January ===
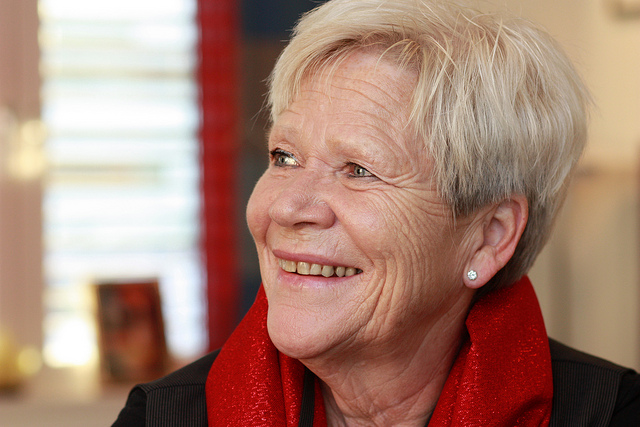
Eirin Faldet

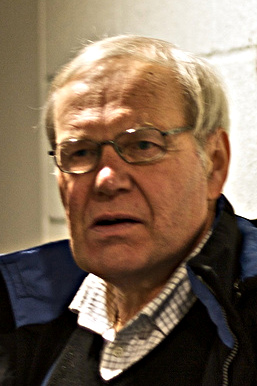
Arne Scheie

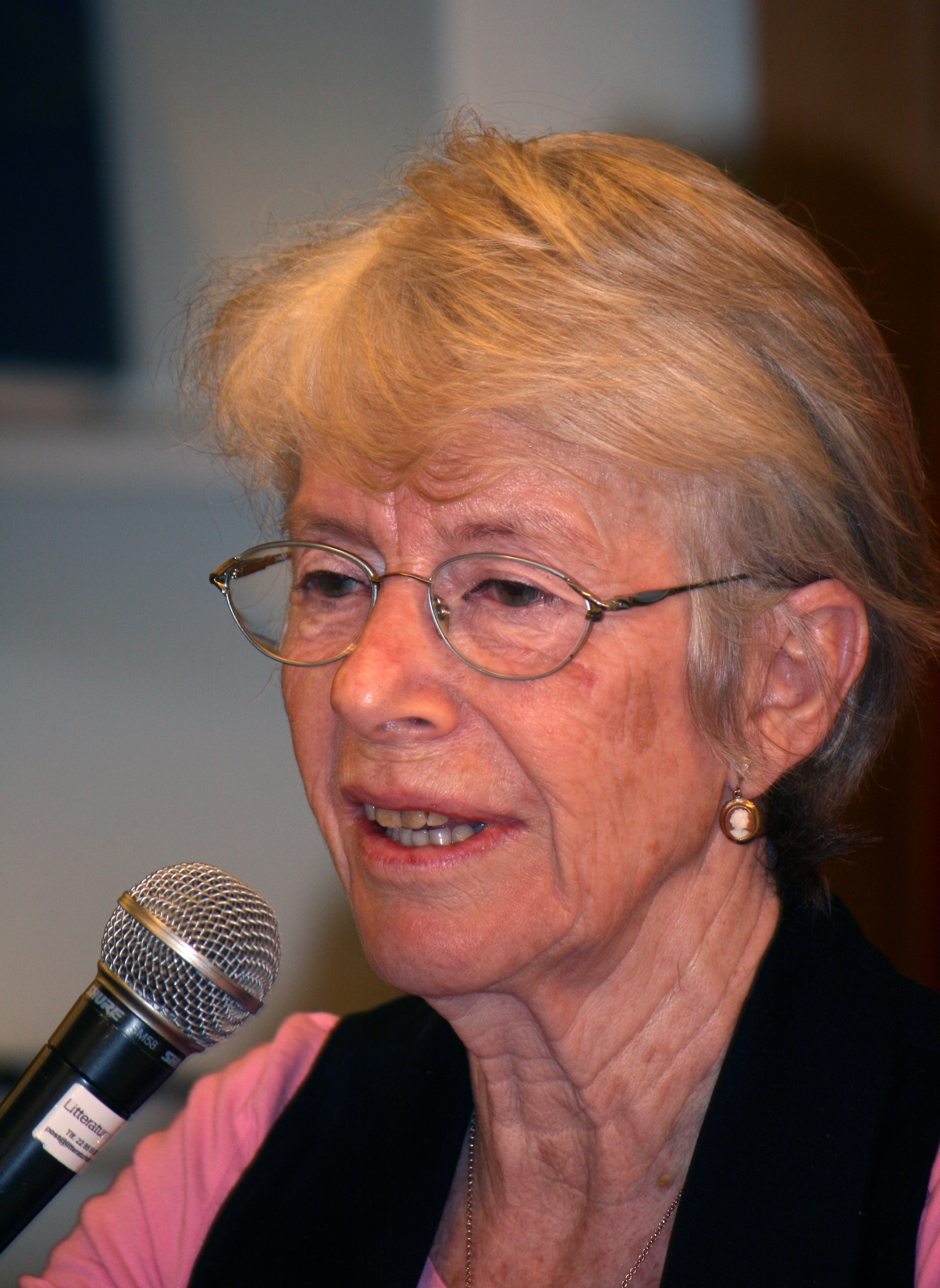
Kjersti Ericsson

- 5 January
  - Eystein Eggen, writer (died 2010).
  - Eirin Faldet, politician.
  - Ørnulf Opdahl, painter.
- 6 January
  - Ørnulf Andresen, cyclist.
  - Mona Lyngar, novelist (died 2023).
- 7 January – Arne Scheie, sports commentator.
- 9 January – Roy Hellvin, jazz pianist.
- 13 January – Terje Steen, ice hockey player (died 2020).
- 14 January – Jan Aas, footballer (died 2016).
- 15 January – Lars Albert Wensell, civil servant and diplomat.
- 18 January – Kjersti Ericsson, psychologist, poet and politician.
- 23 January – Kjell Georg Lund, race walker.
- 24 January – Kåre Hovda, biathlete (died 1999).

=== February ===
- 3 February – Bjørn Johansen, ice hockey player (died 2025).
- 7 February – Bjørn Morisse, musician, illustrator and comics creator (died 2006).
- 10 February – Rakel Surlien, judge, civil servant and politician (died 2025).
- 13 February – Lasse Efskind, speed skater, medical doctor and writer.
- 20 February – Erik Fjeldstad, ice hockey player (died 2019).
- 21 February – Harald Sunde, international soccer player and coach
- 22 February – Karsten Isachsen, Lutheran priest and non-fiction writer (died 2016).
- 23 February – Per Martin Sunde, alpine skier.
- 24 February
  - Bjørn Aamodt, poet (died 2006).
  - Terje Sandkjær, politician.
- 26 February – Arne Henriksen, architect.

=== March ===
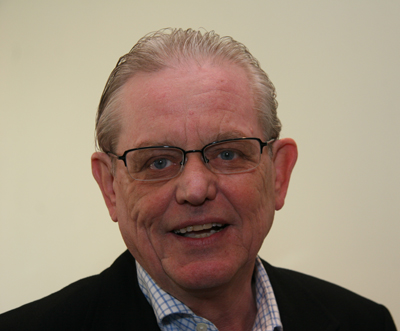
Arne Strand

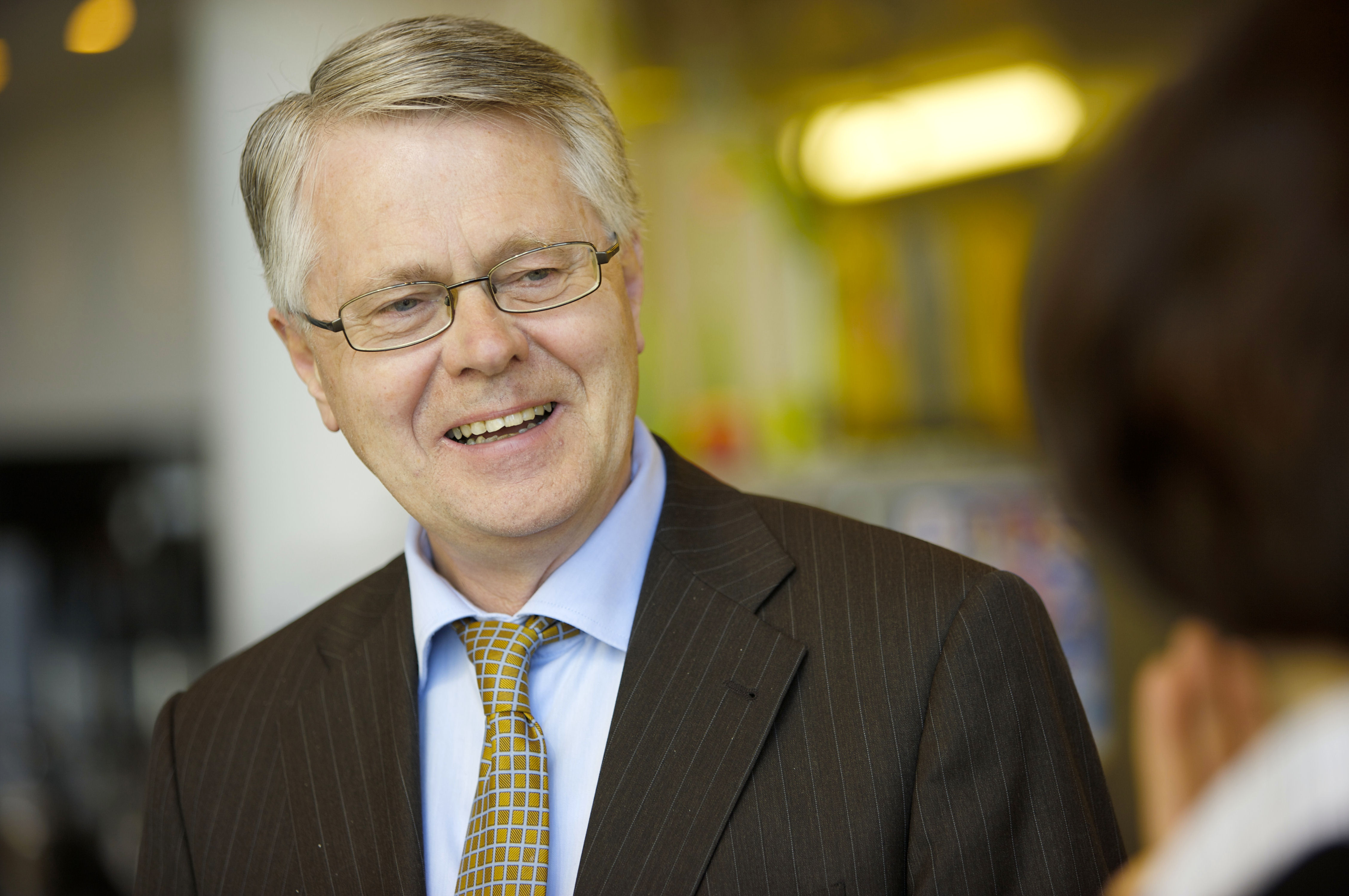
Oddvar Flæte

- 3 March – Arvid Knutsen, soccer player and coach (died 2009)
- 6 March – Jarmund Øyen, politician
- 11 March – Øyvind Grøn, physicist
- 12 March – Fredrik Engelstad, sociologist
- 15 March
  - Jørun Drevland, politician
  - Knut Hendriksen, opera director (died 2020).
  - Roger Hverven, handball player.
- 17 March – Arne Strand, journalist and newspaper editor (died 2023).
- 20 March – Jan Erik Weber, oceanographer.
- 22 March – Rigmor Kofoed-Larsen, politician
- 26 March – Per Werenskiold, sailor (died 2024).
- 30 March – Bjarne Johannes Hope, civil servant (died 2006)
- 31 March – Oddvar Flæte, county governor.

=== April ===
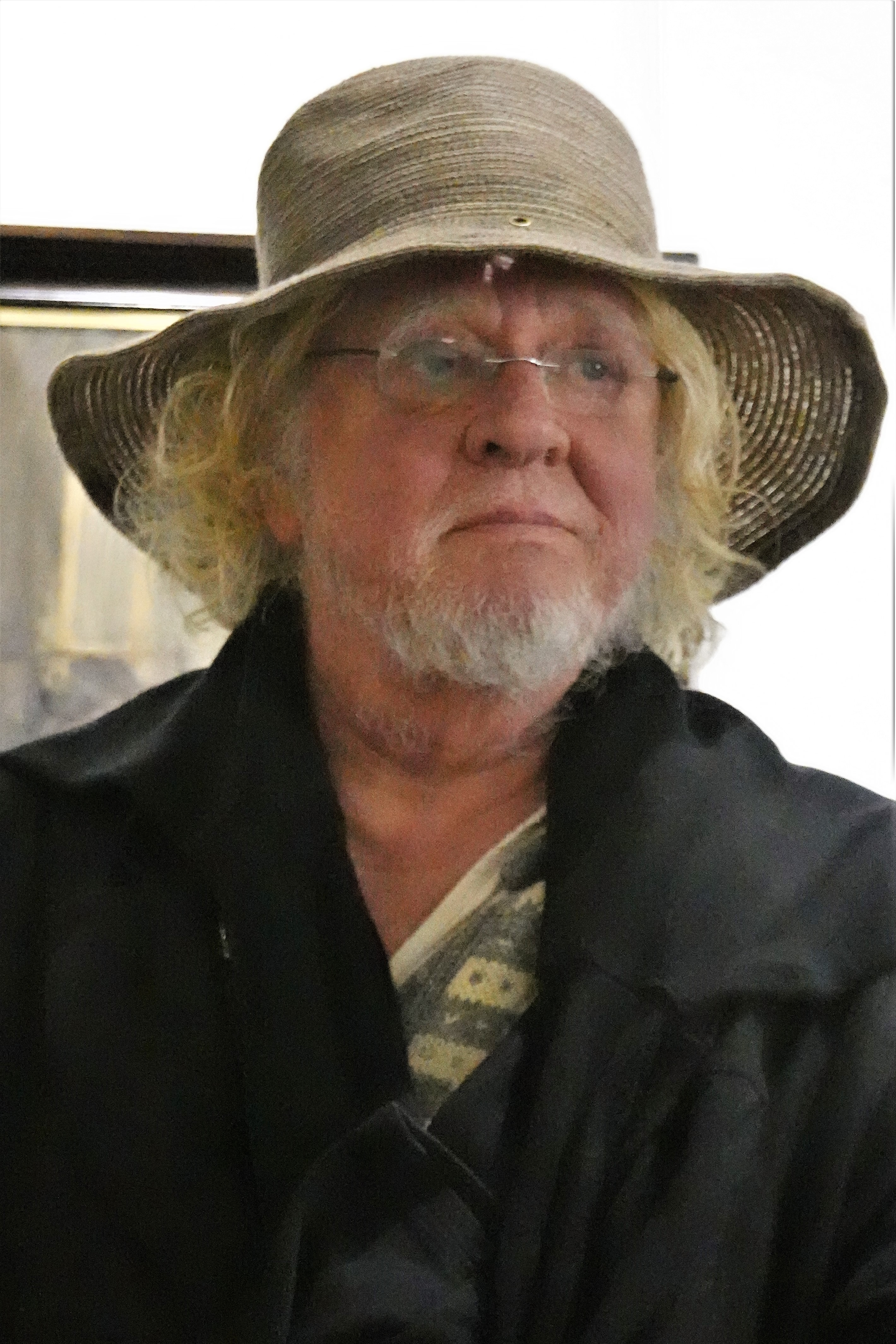
Odd Nerdrum

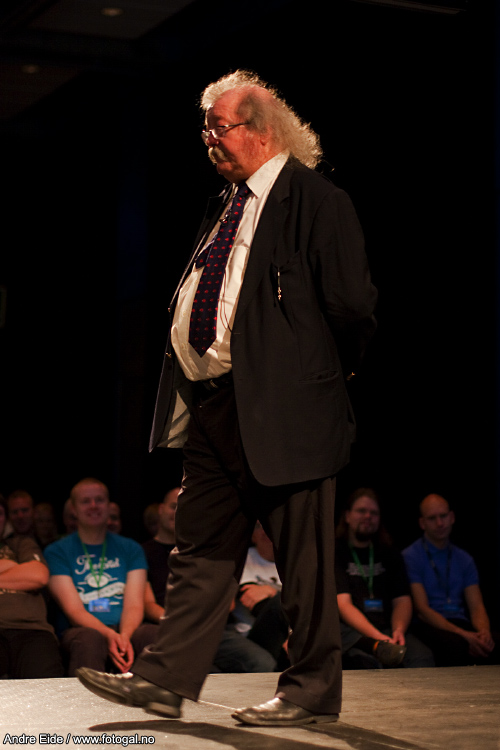
Jon Bing, science fiction writer and jurist.

- 3 April – Steinar Imsen, historian and professor.
- 5 April – Arne Risa, long-distance runner
- 6 April – Halvor Stenstadvold, business person and politician.
- 7 April – Jorunn Kjellsby, actress (died 2025).
- 8 April – Odd Nerdrum, painter
- 9 April – Kåre Olav Berg, Nordic combined skier (died 2007).
- 11 April – Terje Haugland, long jumper
- 14 April – Bjørn Atle Holter-Hovind, media and corporate executive.
- 18 April – Åse Gunhild Woie Duesund, politician
- 20 April
  - Peter Butenschøn, architect and publicist.
  - Frank Olafsen, football player, bandy player and ice hockey player.
- 23 April
  - Tore Milsett, cyclist.
  - Tore Sandberg, journalist, non-fiction writer and private investigator.
  - Terje Thoen, ice hockey player (died 2008).
- 25 April
  - Berit Berthelsen, athlete (died 2022).
  - Einar Steen-Nøkleberg, classical pianist and musical pedagogue.
- 28 April – Magne Aarøen, politician (died 2003)
- 27 April
  - Siri Austeng, politician (died 2017).
  - Bjørn Dyrdahl, luger.
  - Øyvind Østerud, political scientist (died 2025).
- 30 April – Jon Bing, writer and law professor (died 2014).

=== May ===
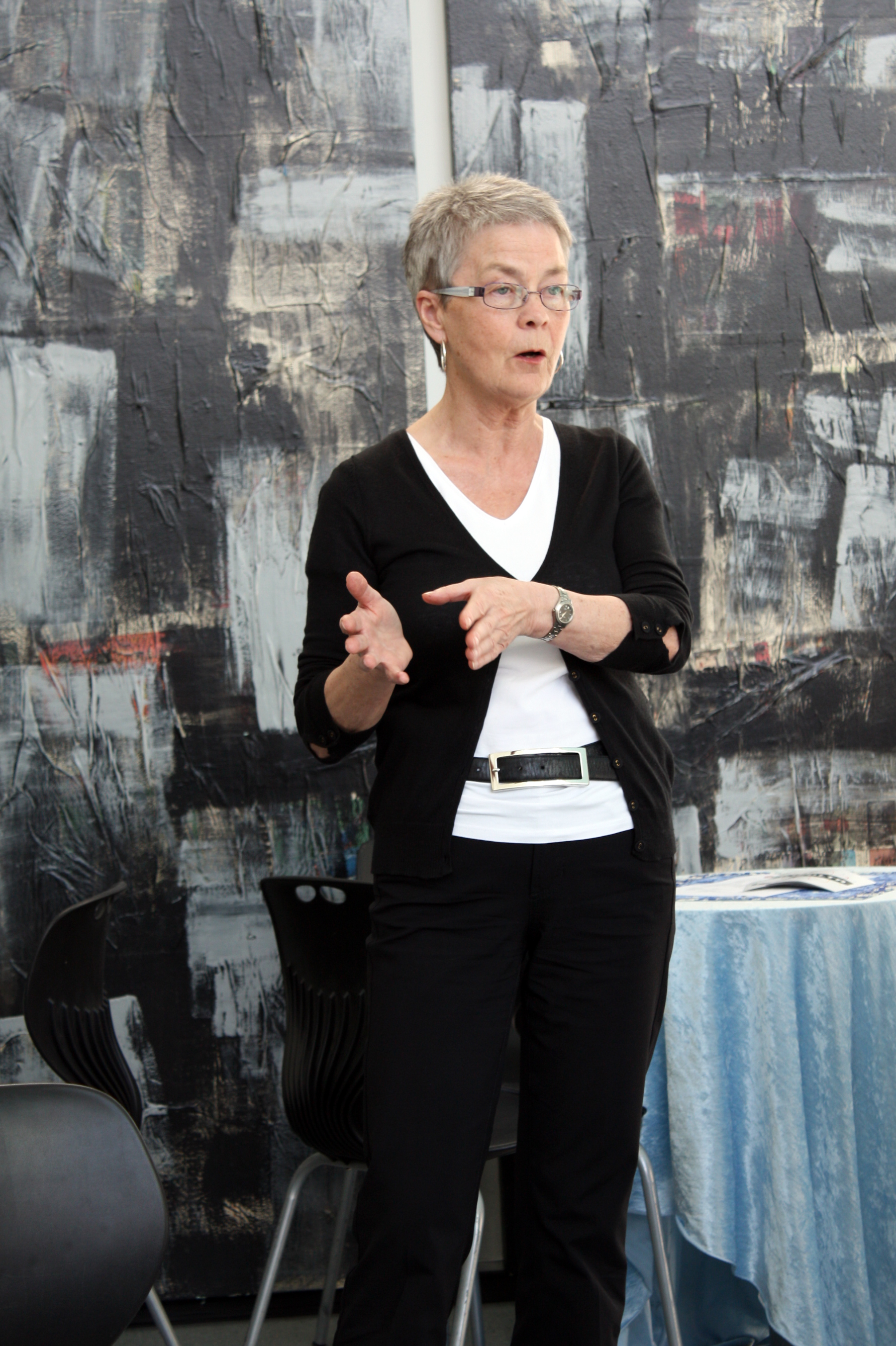
Wenche Cumming

- 2 May – Wenche Cumming, politician.
- 5 May – Arne Risa, long-distance runner who specialized in 3000 metres steeplechase and 10,000 metres.
- 6 May – Carl I. Hagen, politician
- 7 May – Eva Norvind, writer, documentary producer, director, sex therapist and actress (died 2006)
- 10 May – John Fredriksen, oil tanker and shipping tycoon
- 16 May – Jørgen Holte, politician
- 17 May – Harald Wigaard, gymnast.
- 24 May – Ivar Fonnes, civil servant, national archivist.
- 26 May – Jan Kinder, ice hockey player (died 2013).
- 27 May – Karen Fladset, handball player and coach.

=== June ===
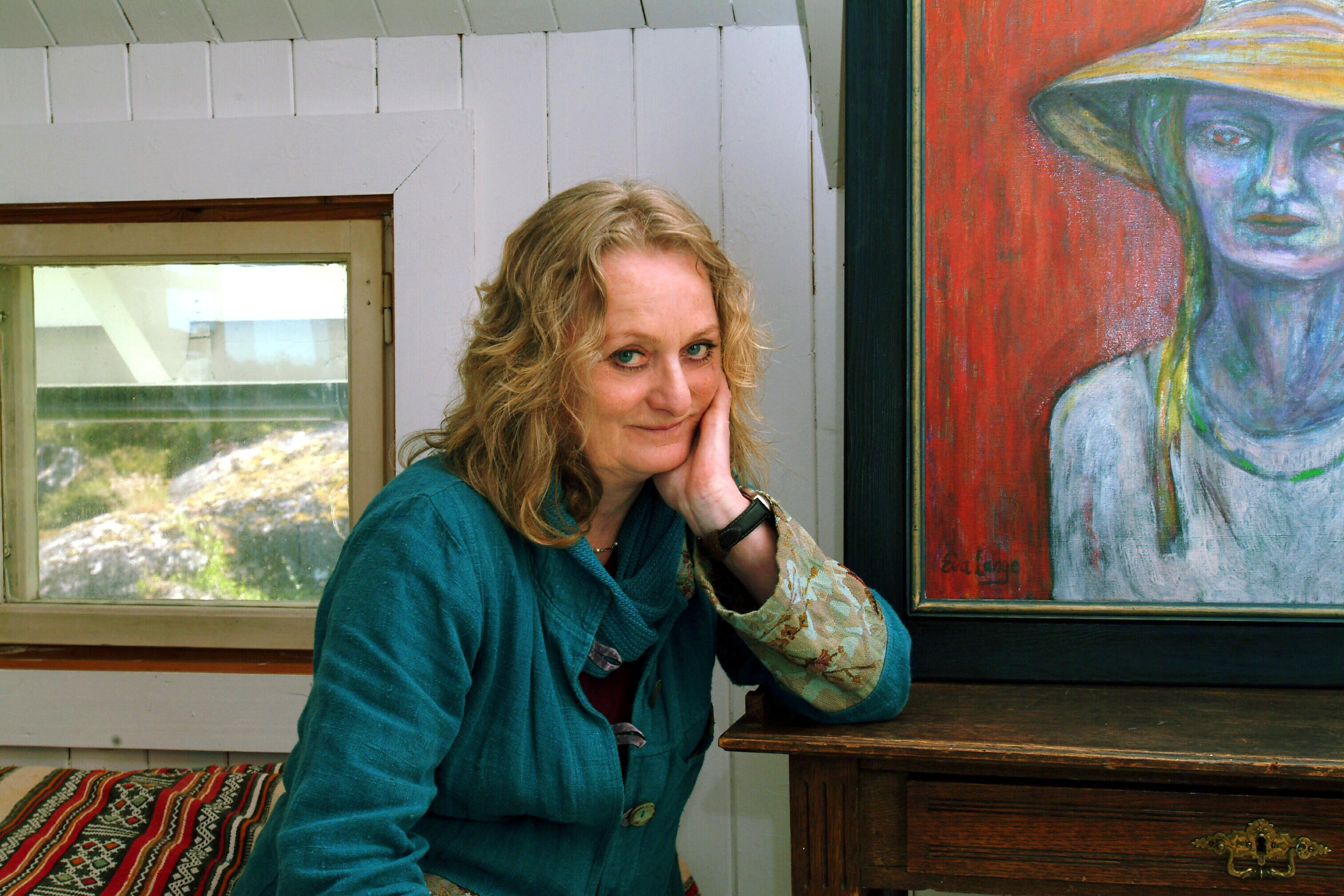
Eva Lange, painter and printmaker

- 1 June – Øyvind Nordsletten, diplomat
- 7 June – Kjartan Fløgstad, author
- 8 June – Ann-Mari Hvaal, artistic gymnast.
- 12 June – Bjørn Elvenes, ice hockey player (died 1988).
- 13 June – Bjørn Tveter, speed skater
- 15 June – Eva Lange, painter and printmaker (died 2017).
- 18 June – Ailo Gaup, Sámi shaman and author
- 19 June – Arne Holen, musicologist
- 28 June – Ellen Auensen, illustrator.
- 29 June – Lars Grini, ski jumper and Olympic bronze medallist
- 30 June – Truls Olav Winther, literary historian (died 2024).

=== July ===
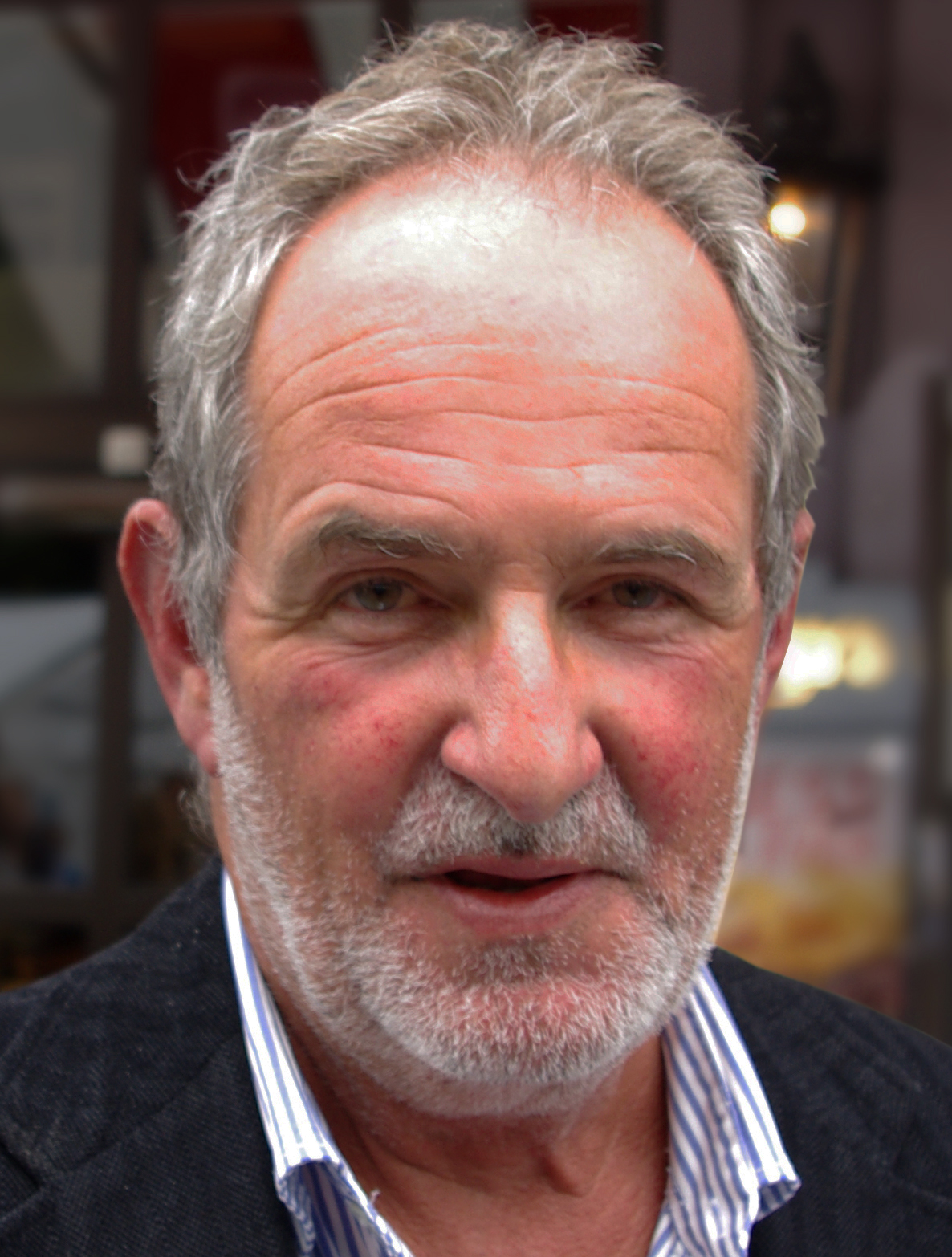
Jon Michelet in 2011

- 3 July – Sverre Mitsem, judge (died 2005)
- 4 July – Jan Erik Kongshaug, sound engineering, jazz guitarist, and composer
- 12 July – Kjell Kristian Rike, sports commentator (died 2008)
- 14 July – Jon Michelet, thriller and crime fiction writer (Orion's Belt), publisher, newspaper editor (Klassekampen) and politician (died 2018).
- 15 July – Trygve Retvik, artist.
- 18 July – Sverre Anker Ousdal, actor (died 2026)
- 19 July – Jan Reinås, businessperson (died 2010).
- 23 July – Arne Mikkelsen, ice hockey player.
- 25 July – Svein Erik Nilsen, rower.
- 27 July – Johan C. Løken, politician (died 2017).
- 31 July – Knut Einar Eriksen, historian

=== August ===
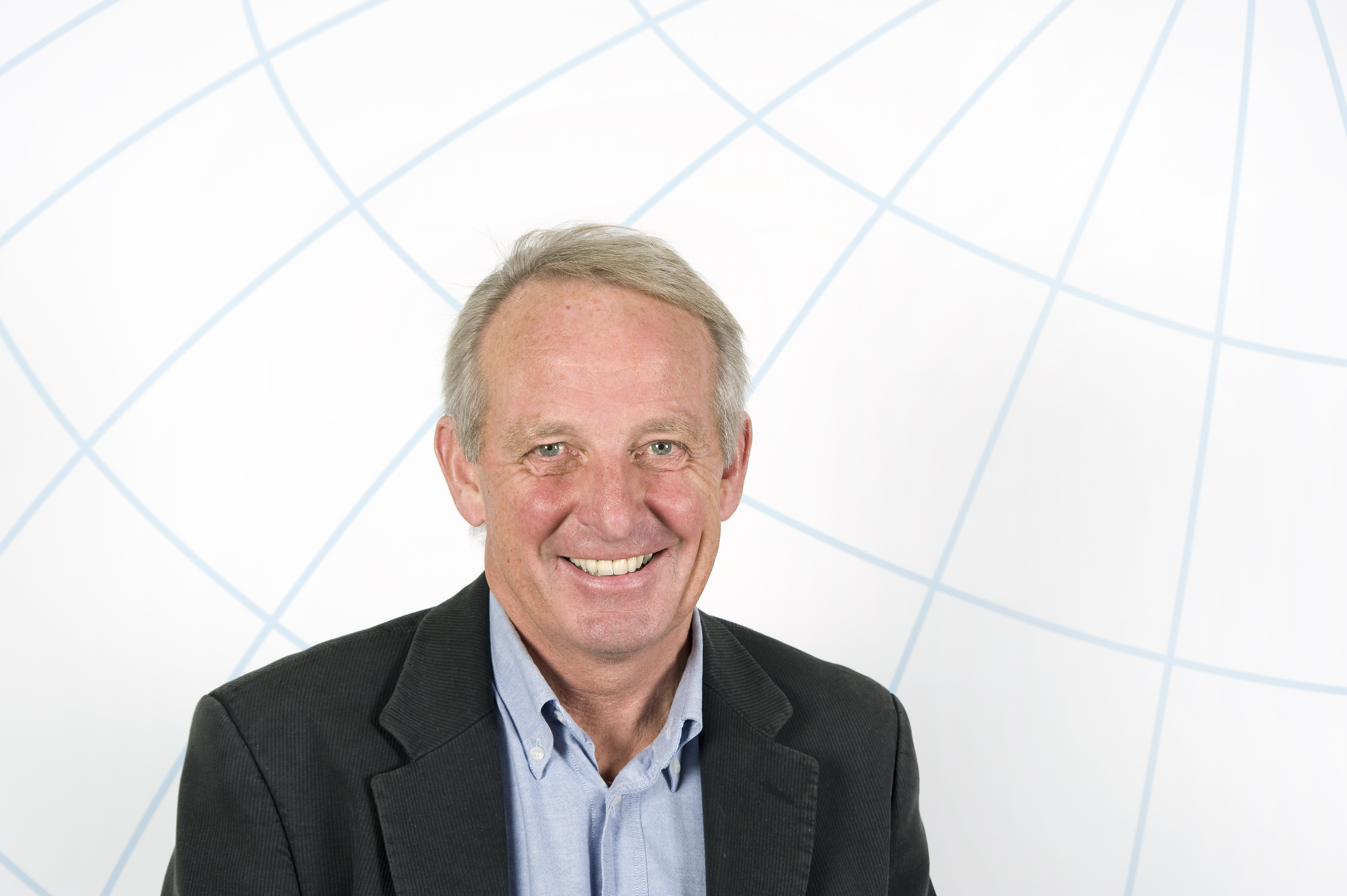
Åge Hadler

- 1 August – Tom Christensen, ice hockey player.
- 4 August – Nina Sundbye, sculptor.
- 5 August – Lars Myraune, military officer and politician.
- 11 August – Inger Nordal, botanist.
- 14 August – Åge Hadler, orienteer (world champion 1966, 1970).
- 15 August – Thor Spydevold, footballer (died 2024).
- 28 August – Katharina Mo-Berge, cross-country skier.

=== September ===
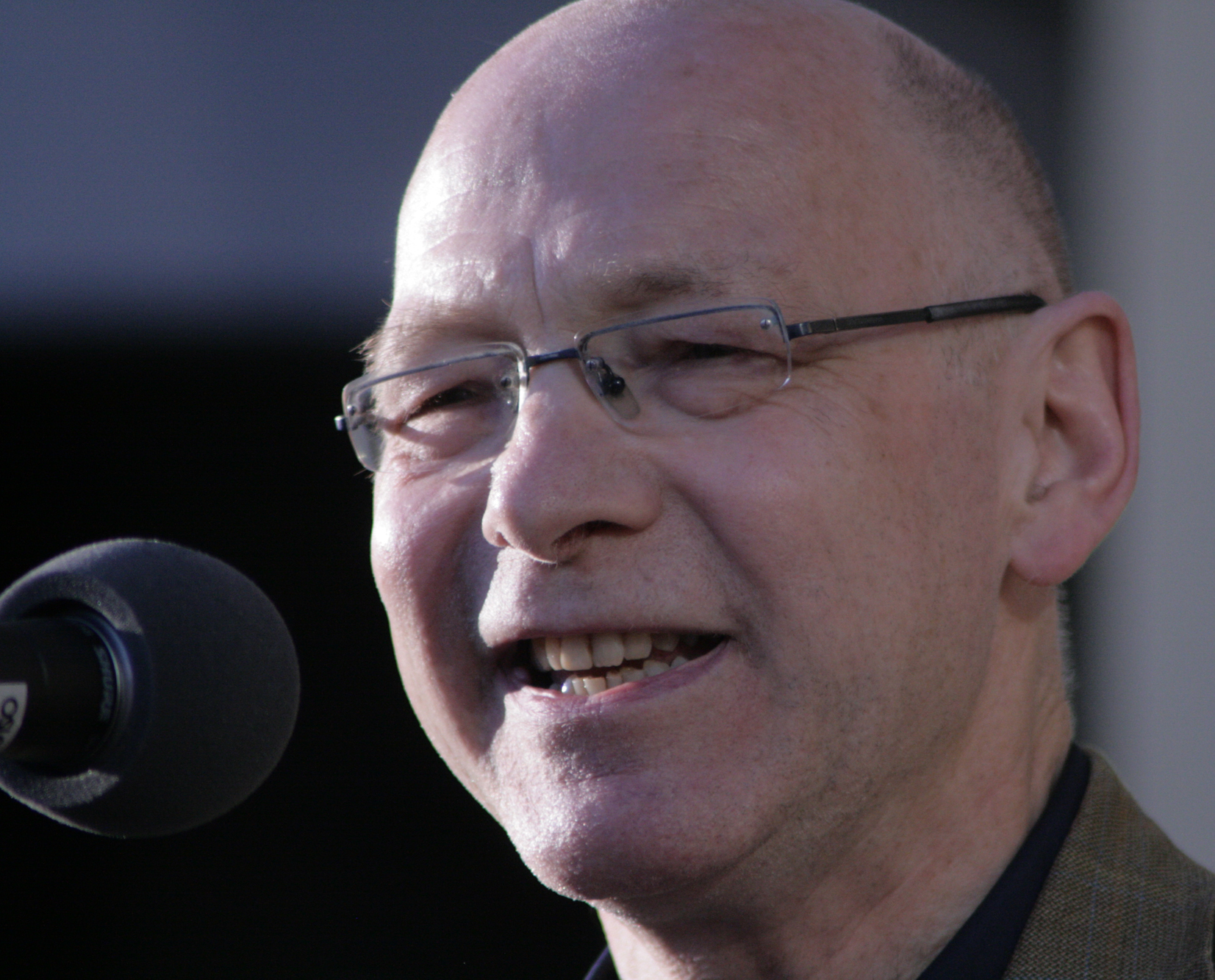
Halvor Moxnes

- 7 September – Britt Mjaasund Øyen, ice sledge speed racer.
- 9 September – Finn Urdal, handball player.
- 13 September – Halvor Moxnes, theologian.
- 20 September – Siri Frost Sterri, politician.
- 27 September – Villy Haugen, speed skater and Olympic bronze medallist.
- 29 September – Sven Kroken, curler.

=== October ===
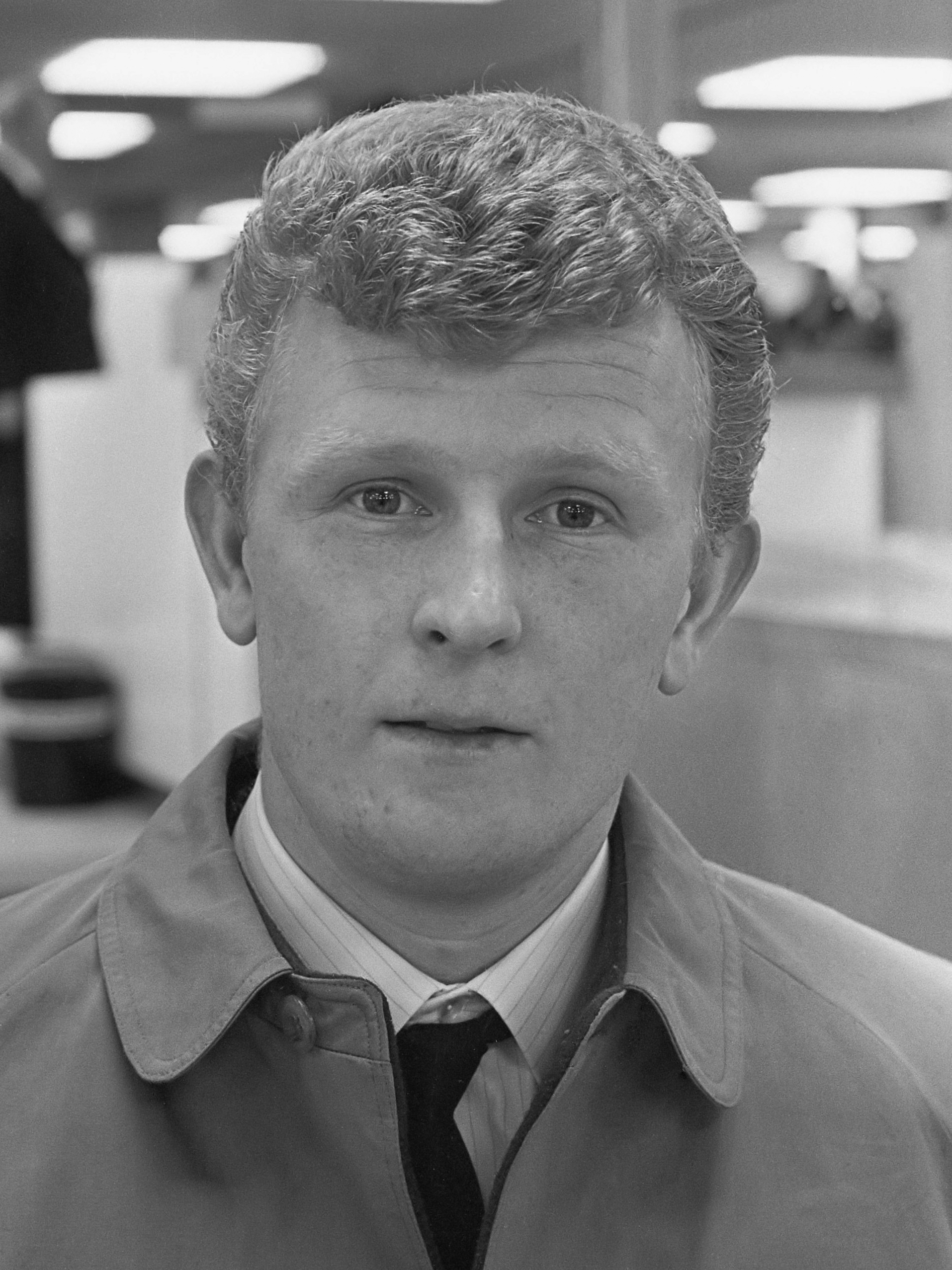
Finn Seemann

- 1 October – Yngvar Numme, singer, actor, revue writer and director (died 2023).
- 8 October – Didrik Tønseth, diplomat and lawyer.
- 9 October – Jan Fredrik Wiborg, civil engineer (died 1994)
- 11 October – Bernt Albert, politician.
- 12 October – Øivind Andersen, philologist.
- 13 October – Hans Olav Østgaard, jurist and civil servant.
- 14 October – Svein Flåtten, politician
- 17 October – Leiv Nergaard, businessperson
- 18 October – Finn Seemann, international soccer player (died 1985)
- 23 October – Liv Lundberg, author (died 2022).
- 29 October – Geir Henning Braaten, pianist.

=== November ===
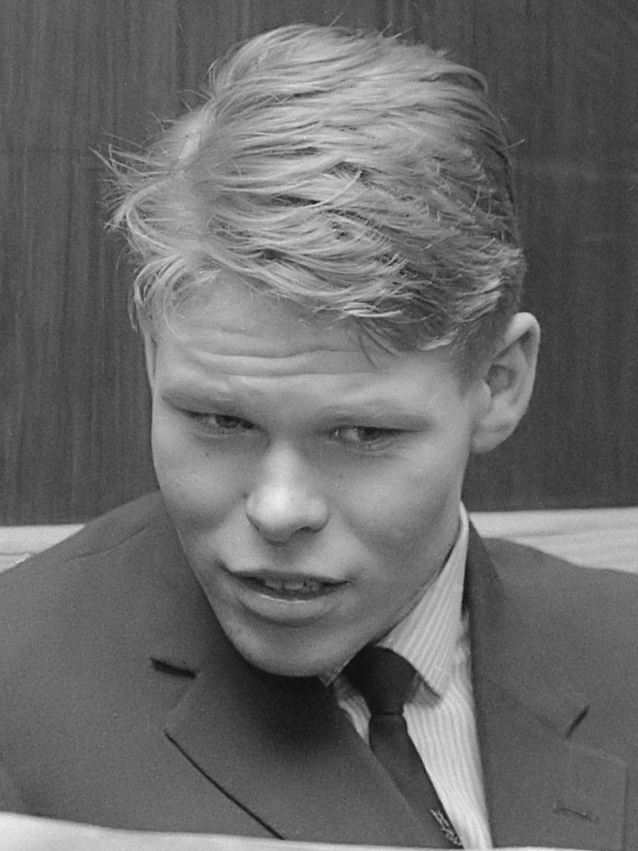
Per Ivar Moe

- 5 November
  - Asmund Kristoffersen, politician
  - Håkon Mjøen, alpine skier.
- 8 November – Else Mundal, philologist.
- 9 November – Else Bugge Fougner, lawyer and a politician.
- 11 November
  - Tore Berger, sprint canoer, Olympic gold medallist and World Champion (died 2026).
  - Per Ivar Moe, speed skater and Olympic silver medallist
- 12 November – Tore Hem, sport wrestler.
- 18 November – Unni Wikan, professor of social anthropology.
- 24 November – Brit Vingelsgaard Ryen, politician.
- 26 November
  - Anstein Gjengedal, police chief.
  - Kjellbjørg Lunde, politician

=== December ===
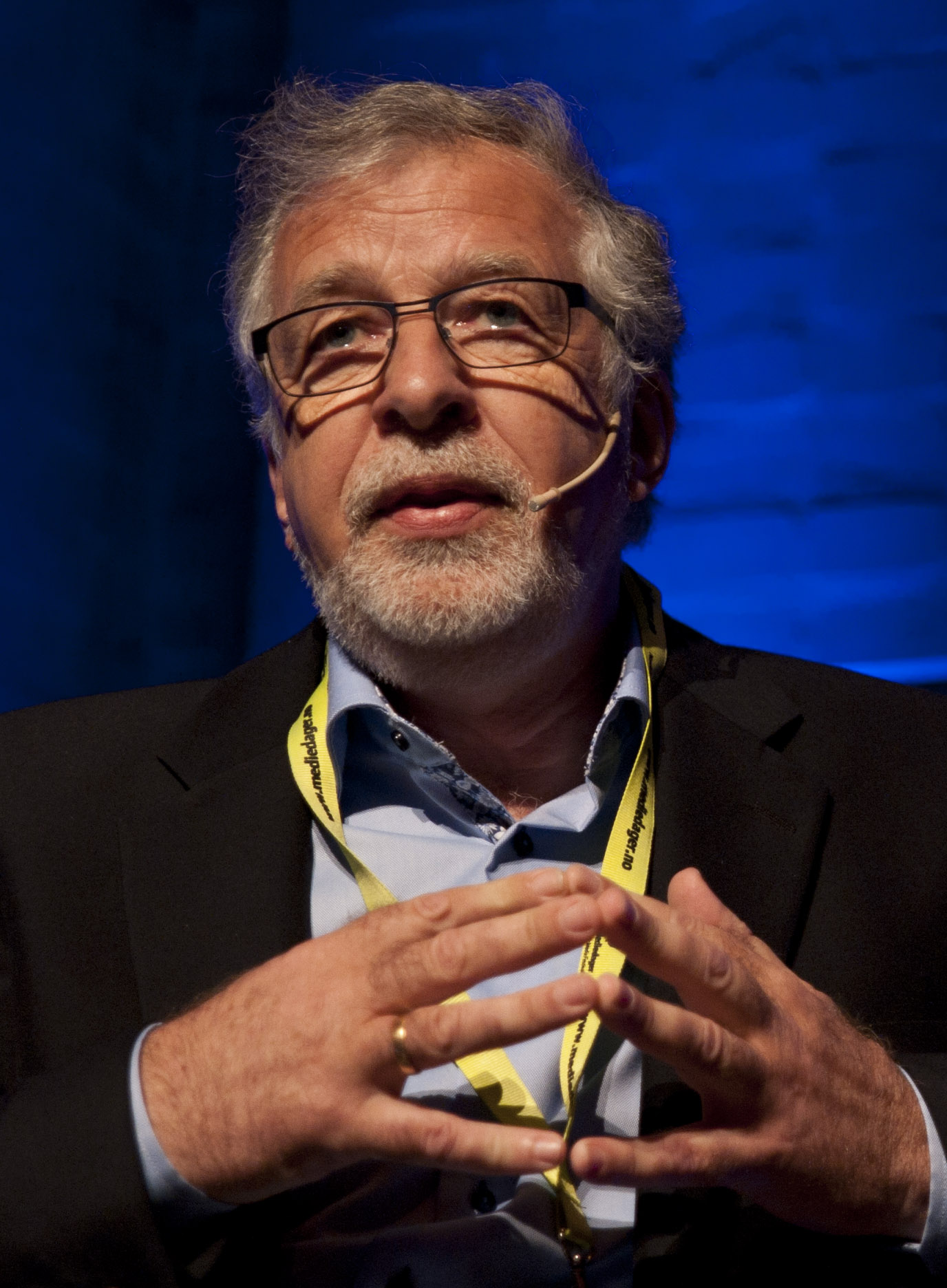
Oddgeir Bruaset

- 1 December – Nils Ole Oftebro, actor.
- 3 December – Jan Johansen, sprint canoer, Olympic gold medallist and World Champion
- 4 December – Ernst Wroldsen, politician.
- 8 December – Beate Audum Mulholland, children's writer (died 1994).
- 10 December – Oddgeir Bruaset, journalist and non-fiction writer.
- 13 December – Ursula Evje, politician
- 14 December – Jon Terje Øverland, alpine skier.
- 16 December – Bjørn Ransve, painter and printmaker.
- 24 December – Jan Erik Berntsen, actor and singer (died 2025)
- 26 December
  - Lasse Hamre, alpine skier.
  - Børre Rognlien, sports official and politician.
- 27 December – John M. Jacobsen, film producer
- 31 December – Kristin Hille Valla, politician and minister

=== Full date unknown ===
- Jiri Hlinka, music professor and piano teacher
- Stein H. Annexstad, businessperson and politician
- Ole T. Berg, political scientist
- Sven G. Eliassen, historian
- Øystein Josefsen, businessperson and politician
- Bjørn Myrseth, biologist and businessperson
- Nic. Nilsen, businessperson
- Åsmund Reikvam, professor in medicine and former politician
- Aud Talle, social anthropologist
- Torkel Wetterhus, businessperson and politician

== Deaths ==
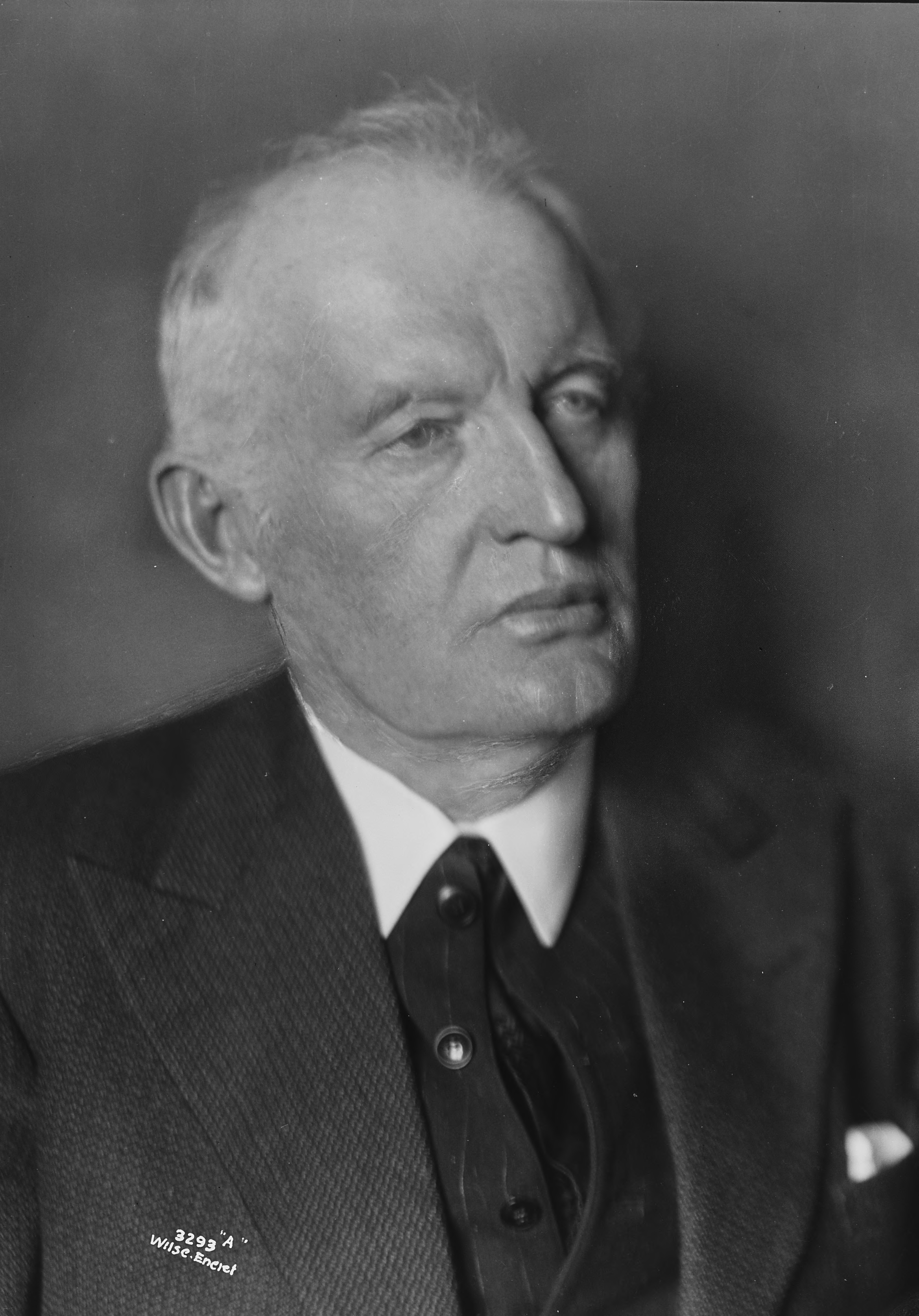
Edvard Munch

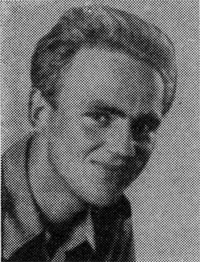
Gregers Gram

- 23 January – Edvard Munch, painter and printmaker (born 1863).
- 19 February – Reidar Haave Olsen, pilot (born 1923)
- 17 March – Lilly Heber, literary historian and magazine editor (born 1879).
- 25 April – Olav Nielsen, boxer (born 1902)
- 30 May – Martin Rasmussen Hjelmen, sailor and activist (born 1904).
- 12 June – Einar Hærland, military officer, executed (born 1909)
- 24 June – Sigurd Roll, diplomat and former sprinter (born 1893)
- 8 August – Ragnvald Hvoslef, politician (born 1872)
- 14 October – Torleif Torkildsen, gymnast and Olympic bronze medallist (born 1892)
- 13 November – Gregers Gram, resistance fighter and saboteur (born 1917)
- 5 December – Michael Hansson, judge (born 1875).
- 12 December – Alf Hjort, electrical engineer in America (born 1877)

=== Full date unknown ===
- Haakon Martin Five, politician and Minister (born 1880)
- Alfred Klingenberg, pianist (born 1867)
- Odd Sverressøn Klingenberg, politician and Minister (born 1871)
