= Elvenes =

Elvenes may refer to:

== Places ==
- Elvenes, Alta, a village in Alta municipality, Finnmark county, Norway
- Elvenes, Finnmark, a village in Sør-Varanger municipality, Finnmark county, Norway
- Elvenes, Nordland, a village in Øksnes municipality, Nordland county, Norway
- Elvenes, Salangen, a village in Salangen municipality, Troms county, Norway
- Elvenes, Troms, a village in Gratangen municipality, Troms county, Norway

== People ==
- Bjørn Elvenes (1944–1988), Norwegian ice hockey player
- Hroar Elvenes (1932–2014), Norwegian speed skater
- Hårek Elvenes (born 1959), Norwegian politician
