= 1944 in Norwegian music =

The following is a list of notable events and releases of the year 1944 in Norwegian music.

== Events ==
August

- 21 – Song of Norway by Robert Wright and George Forrest, adapted from the music of Edvard Grieg opened at Broadway.

== Deaths ==
April

- 1 – Sandra Droucker, classical pianist, composer and radio personality (born 1875).

== Births ==
January

- 9 – Roy Hellvin, pianist, composer, and music arranger.

February

- 24 – Oddbjørn Blindheim, jazz pianist and dentist.

June

- 7 – Erling Wicklund, jazz trombonist, composer, music arranger and journalist (died 2019).
- 19 – Arne Holen, musicologist.

July

- 4 – Jan Erik Kongshaug, sound engineering, jazz guitarist, and composer (died 2019).
- 17 – Aage Teigen, jazz trombonist (died 2014)

October

- 1 – Yngvar Numme, singer, actor, revue writer and director (died 2023).

Unknown date

- Jiri Hlinka, music professor and piano teacher.

== See also ==
- 1944 in Norway
- Music of Norway
