= Bruvik =

Bruvik may refer to:

== Places ==
- Bruvik Municipality, a former municipality in the old Hordaland county, Norway
- Bruvik, Vestland, a village in Osterøy municipality, Vestland county, Norway
- Bruvik Church, a church in Osterøy municipality, Vestland county, Norway

== People ==
- Olav Bruvik (1913–1962), Norwegian trade unionist and politician for the Labour Party
- Trygve Bruvik (born 1952), Norwegian engineer and businessman
