= Sverre Mitsem =

Sverre Mitsem may refer to:

- Sverre Mitsem (judge), Norwegian Supreme Court Justice
- Sverre Mitsem (writer), Norwegian writer
