= Marine Farms =

International company that specialises in fish farming

Marine Farms ASA
- Company type: Public (OSE: MAFA)
- Industry: Fish farming
- Founded: 1976
- Founder: Bjørn Myrseth
- Headquarters: Bergen, Norway
- Key people: Bjørn Myrseth (CEO); Trygve Bruvik (chair)
- Revenue: 735 million kr (2007)
- Number of employees: 547 (2008)
- Website: www.marinefarms.no (Archived)

Marine Farms ASA is a Norwegian fish farming company. Based in Bergen, it operates salmon farms in the United Kingdom and Spain, through the subsidiaries Lakeland and Culmarex, respectively. It also holds investments in Belize and Vietnam. The company is listed on the Oslo Stock Exchange.

The company was founded in 1976 as Lax AS by Bjørn Myrseth, for his ownership in Stolt Sea Farm. The Stolt shares were sold in 1987, and the company started making its own investments in fish farming.
