= Bøkfjorden =

Fjord in Sør-Varanger Municipality, Norway

Bøkfjorden (Norwegian); Báhčaveajvuonna (Northern Sami)
- Elvenesfjorden (historic Norwegian name); Baččevæjvuodna (historic Sami name)
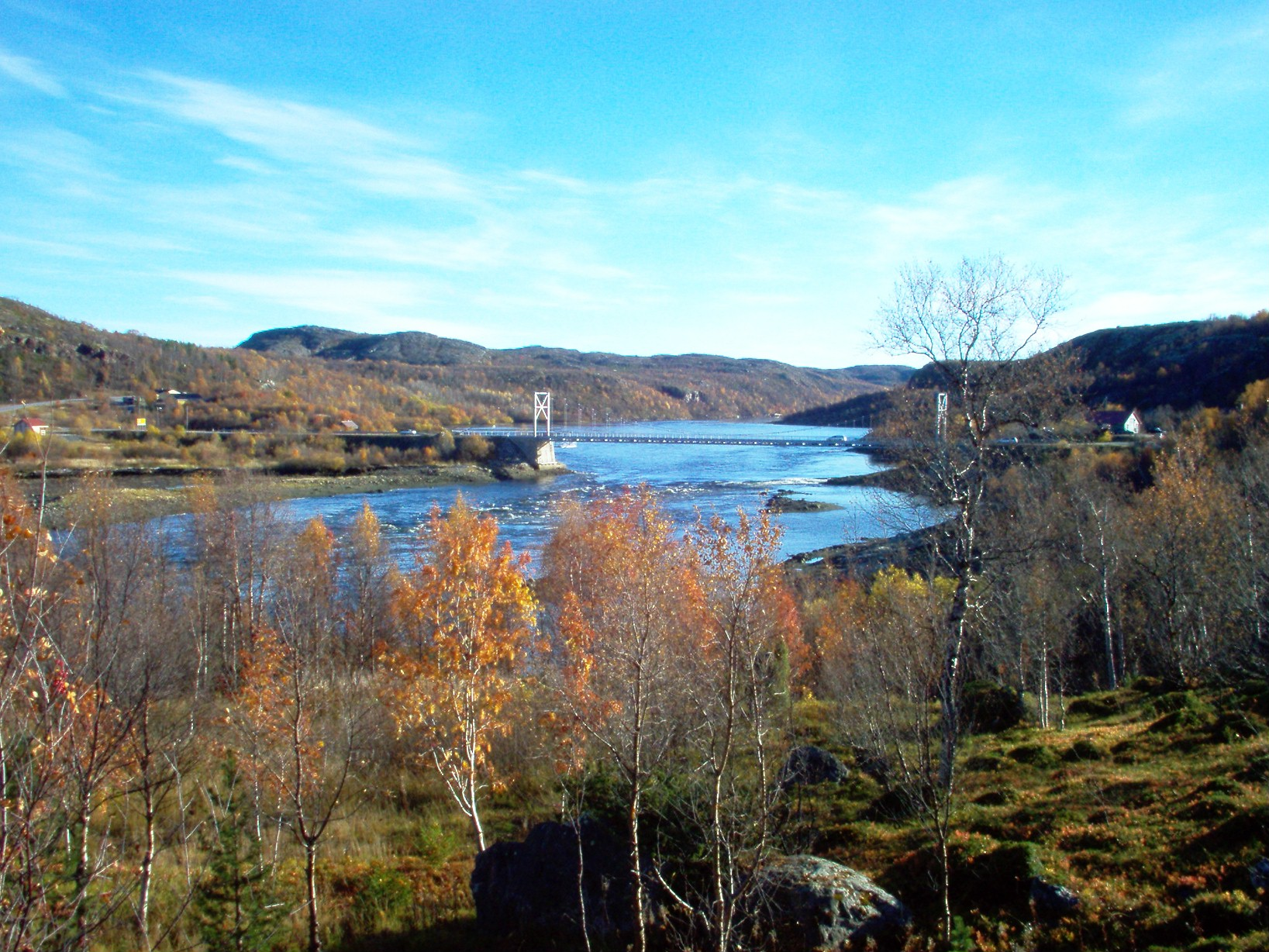
- The Pasvikelva river emptying into the Bøkfjorden
- Interactive map of: Bøkfjorden (Norwegian); Báhčaveajvuonna (Northern Sami)
- Location: Finnmark county, Norway
- Coordinates: 69.7429°N 30.0521°E
- Type: Fjord
- River sources: Pasvikelva
- Primary outflows: Varangerfjorden
- Basin countries: Norway
- Max. length: 23 kilometres (14 mi)
- Max. width: 0.6 to 2.5 km (0.37 to 1.55 mi)
- Max. depth: 261 metres (856 ft)
- Settlements: Kirkenes

Bøkfjorden (Norwegian) or Báhčaveajvuonna (Northern Sami) is a fjord in Sør-Varanger Municipality in Finnmark county, Norway. The 23-kilometre (14 mi) long fjord is a southern branch off of the main Varangerfjord. The river Pasvikelva empties into the Bøkfjorden at the village of Elvenes (which lies only about 1,500 metres (0.93 mi) from the Norway–Russia border. At this place the Bøkfjord Bridge is located, which crosses the river/fjord where they meet.

The town of Kirkenes lies on the shore of the fjord. The large island of Skogerøya lies on the western side of the fjord. The Bøkfjord Lighthouse is located in the mouth of the Bøkfjorden.
