= Elvenes, Finnmark =

Village in Sør-Varanger, Norway

Elvenes (Norwegian): Jokknjargg (Skolt Sami); Johkanjárga (Northern Sami); Jokiniemi (Kven)
- Village
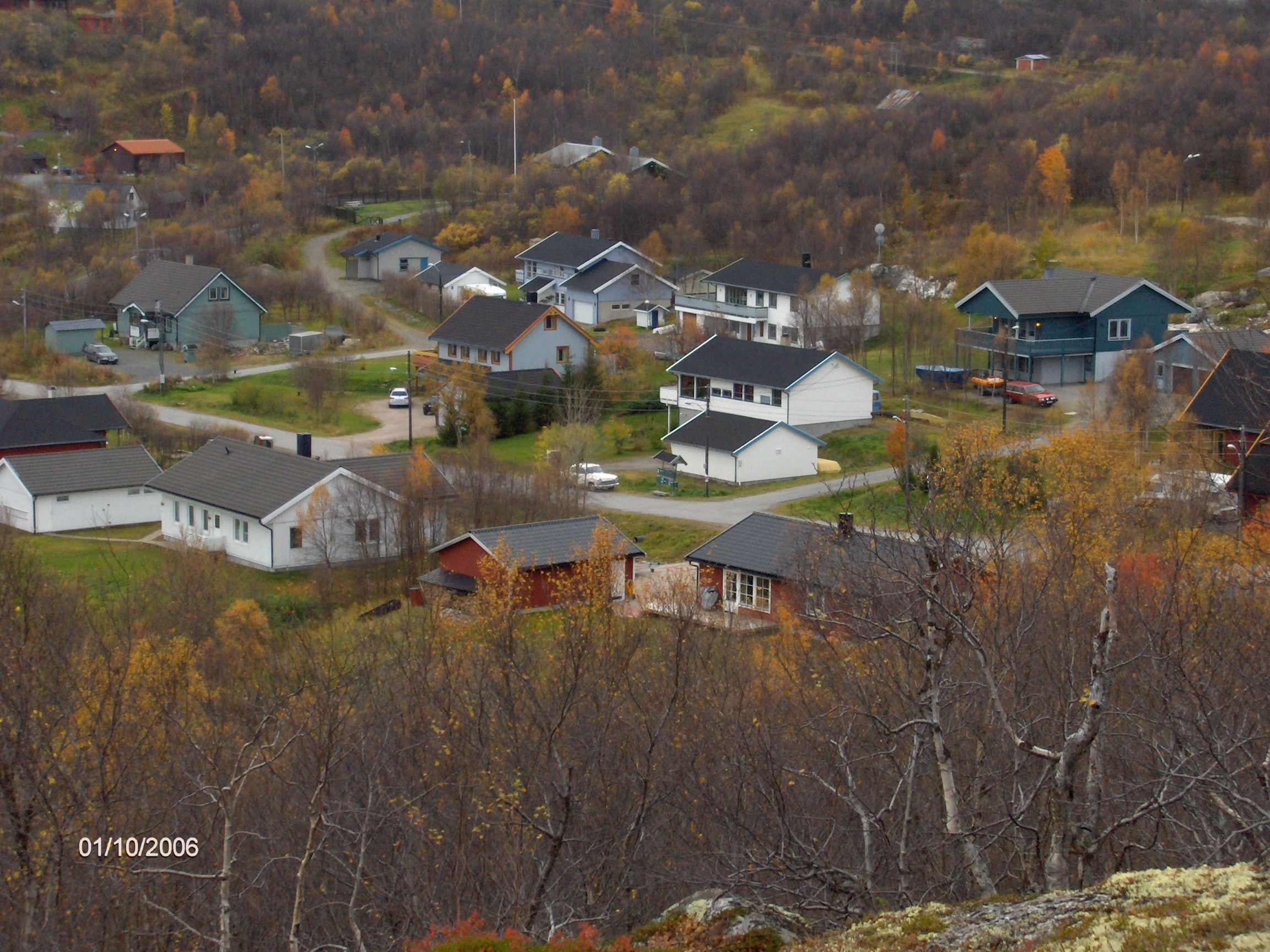
- View of the village
- Interactive map of Elvenes (Norwegian)
- Location within Finnmark Location within Norway
- Coordinates: 69°40′45″N 30°06′20″E
- Country: Norway
- Region: Northern Norway
- County: Finnmark
- District: Øst-Finnmark
- Municipality: Sør-Varanger Municipality
- Elevation: 20 m (66 ft)
- Time zone: UTC+01:00 (CET)
  - Summer (DST): UTC+02:00 (CEST)
- Post Code: 9900 Kirkenes

Elvenes (Norwegian), Jokknjargg (Skolt Sami), Johkanjárga (Northern Sami), or Jokiniemi (Kven) is a village in Sør-Varanger Municipality in Finnmark county, Norway. It is located at the mouth of the river Pasvikelva where it flows into the Bøkfjorden, a southern branch of the Varangerfjorden. The village lies about 6 kilometres (3.7 mi) east of the village of Hesseng, along the European route E105. The town of Kirkenes lies about a 10-kilometre (6.2 mi) drive to the northwest.

== History ==
During the Occupation of Norway by Nazi Germany a camp for Soviet prisoners-of-war was located in Elvenes, and in 1942 about six hundred Norwegian teachers were sent to Elvenes for slave labour.

== Road bypass ==
As part of an 875 million kr programme of improvements to European route E105, work started in 2014 on a bypass route to the north of the village comprising a 284-metre (932 ft) long new Bøkfjord Bridge and a new 690-metre (2,260 ft) tunnel through the adjacent Trifonhøgda mountain. The bridge has a 500 tonnes (550 tons) steel central arch span of 120 metres (390 ft), which was constructed in Wilhelmshaven, Germany and will be transported by barge along the entire west and north coast of Norway into the fjord. The section of road between Elvenes and the Russian border at Storskog was constructed in 2013, while the bridge and tunnel opened in September 2017.
