= Bøkfjord Lighthouse =

Coastal lighthouse in Finnmark, Norway

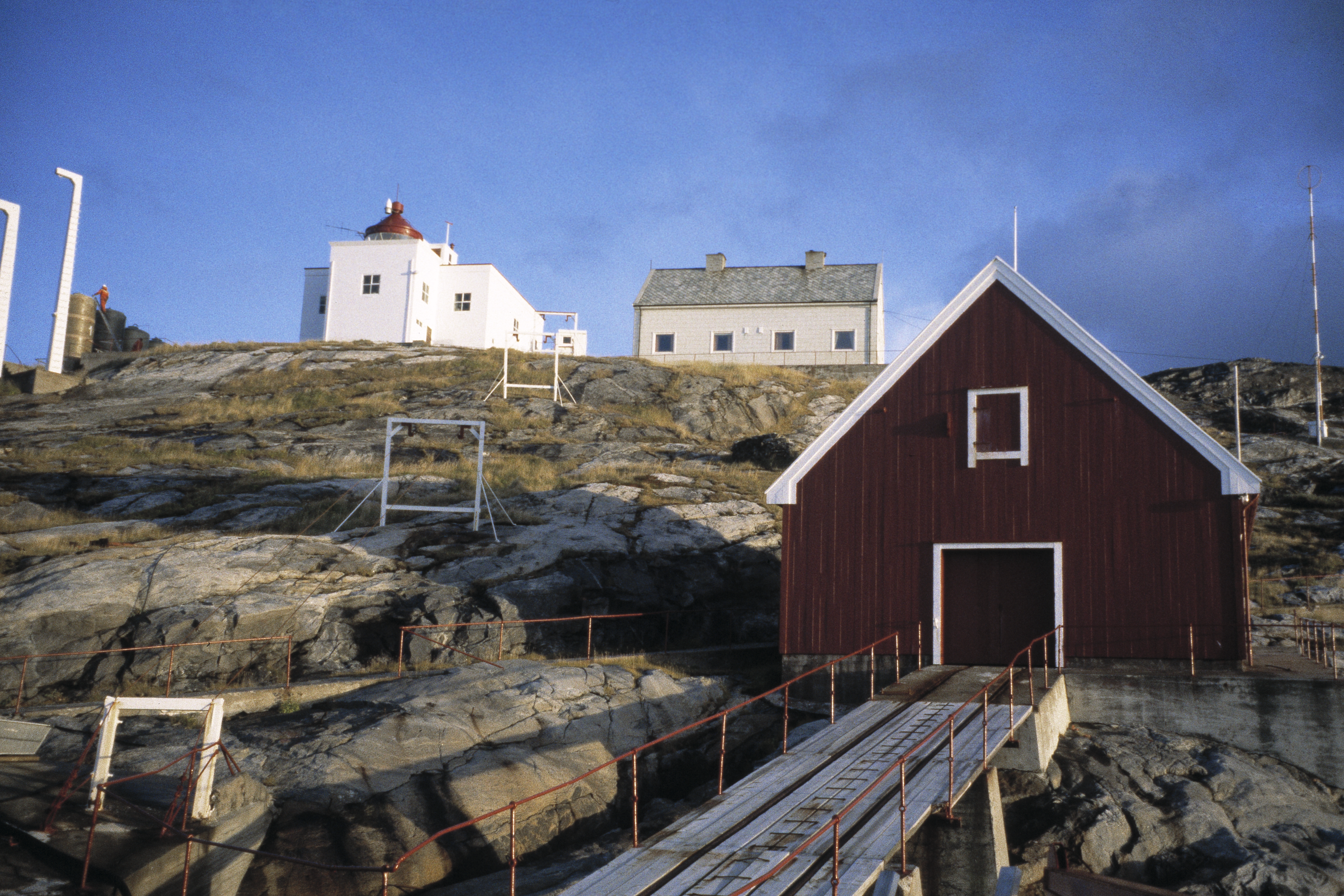
- Bøkfjord Lighthouse
- Location: Sør-Varanger Municipality, Norway
- Coordinates: 69°52′40″N 30°10′27″E

Tower
- Constructed: 1910, 1947
- Construction: concrete
- Automated: 2006
- Height: 10 m (33 ft)
- Markings: white (tower), red (lantern)
- Heritage: cultural heritage preservation in Norway
- Racon: B

Light
- First lit: 1948
- Focal height: 33 m (108 ft)
- Intensity: 513,000 candela
- Range: 16.2 nmi (30.0 km; 18.6 mi)
- Characteristic: Fl(2) W 15s

Bøkfjord Lighthouse (Norwegian: Bøkfjord fyr) is a coastal lighthouse located at the mouth of Bøkfjorden in Finnmark county, Norway. It is located about 20 kilometres (12 mi) north of the town of Kirkenes in Sør-Varanger Municipality, about 26 kilometres (16 mi) west of the border with Russia.

== History ==
The lighthouse was established in 1910, and re-built in 1947–1948, having been destroyed during World War II. The lighthouse was listed as a protected site in 1998 and it was automated in 2006.

The 10-metre (33 ft) tall white, square, concrete tower has a red, metal, cylindrical light room on top. The light emits two white flashes every 15 seconds. The 513,000 candela light can be seen for up to 16.2 nmi (30.0 km; 18.6 mi). The light is emitted at an altitude of 33 metres (108 ft) above sea level. The site is only accessible by boat, and is closed to the public.

== See also ==
- Lighthouses in Norway
- List of lighthouses in Norway
