= Arne Scheie =

Norwegian sports commenter

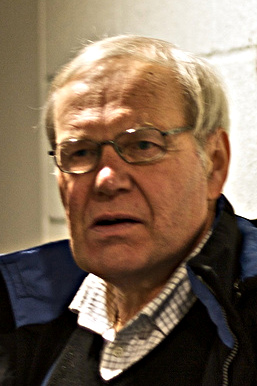
- Scheie în 2009
- Born: Arne Scheie; 7 January 1944 (age 82); Skedsmo, Norway
- Presenting career
- Show: Mostly football and ski jumping
- Station: NRK
- Style: Sports commentator
- Country: Norway

Arne Scheie (born 7 January 1944) is a Norwegian sports commentator, with football and ski jumping as his specialties.

He started working in the Norwegian Broadcasting Corporation in 1972, and started commenting the Four Hills Tournament in 1973. Over the years, he has been involved with eight Winter Olympics, attended over 30 Four Hills Tournaments and has commentated on well over 100 matches for the Norway national football team. Scheie has also commentated on cross-country skiing, biathlon, swimming, and bandy for the Norwegian Broadcasting Corporation.

Arne Scheie is a part of the cultural landscape for many Norwegians, who have grown up with his commentary. Among others, he is known for his spontaneous outbursts to his colleague Jon Herwig Carlsen such as when Tommy Ingebrigtsen won world championship gold in ski jumping in Thunder Bay in 1995: "Can I kiss you, Jon?" Carlsen replied "Yes! Of course!"

Books issued by Scheie include Arne Scheies fotballspørrebok (2001) and Øyeblikkene vi aldri glemmer (2003, with Otto Ulseth). In 2005, he was given the Gullruten honorary award.
