= Terje Steen =

Norwegian ice hockey player (1944–2020)

Personal information
- Born: 13 January 1944; Oslo, Norway
- Died: 1 September 2020 (aged 76)

Sport
- Country: Norway
- Sport: Ice hockey
- Club: Vålerengens IF

Terje Steen (13 January 1944 – 1 September 2020) was a Norwegian ice hockey player. He was born in Oslo and represented the club Vålerengens IF. He played for the Norwegian national ice hockey team, and participated at the Winter Olympics in 1968 and 1972.
