= Per Werenskiold =

Norwegian sailor

Personal information
- Nationality: Norwegian
- Born: 26 March 1944; Bærum
- Died: 21 August 2024 (aged 80)

Sport
- Country: Norway
- Sport: Sailing

Per Werenskiold (26 March 1944 – 21 August 2024) was a Norwegian sailor. He was born in Bærum. He competed at the 1968 Summer Olympics in Mexico and 1972 Summer Olympics in Munich.
