= Beate Mulholland =

Norwegian children's writer

- Born: 8 December 1944; Oslo, Norway
- Died: 4 December 1994 (aged 49)
- Occupation: Children's writer

Beate Audum Mulholland (8 December 1944 – 4 December 1994) was a Norwegian children's writer.

== Career ==
Mulholland made her literary debut in 1978 with the children's book Ser deg siden, Donna. The protagonist is six-year old Mads, who shares a secret with his mother, about the baby inside her.

In her treatment of Norwegian children's literature, Tordis Ørjasæter regards Mulholland's book Paraplytreet from 1980 as her literary breakthrough, and that the description of the friendship between the two kids Mads and Martin stood out in small-children literature in Norway. Further books are Frida – en hundehistorie from 1984, Den magiske barten from 1987, and Allerkjæreste mamma from 1992.

== Life and death ==
Mulholland was born in Oslo on 8 December 1944. She died on 4 December 1994.
