= Jan Erik Weber =

Norwegian oceanographer (born 1944)

Jan Erik Hobæk Weber
- Born: March 20, 1944 (age 82); Gjerpen, Norway
- Education: University of Oslo
- Known for: Professor of physical oceanography; Member of the Norwegian Academy of Science and Letters
- Awards: Fellow, Norwegian Academy of Science and Letters (1988)
- Scientific career
- Fields: Oceanography; Physical oceanography
- Workplaces: University of Oslo

Jan Erik Hobæk Weber (born 20 March 1944) is a Norwegian oceanographer.

He was born in Gjerpen Municipality. He took the dr.philos. degree in 1974, became a professor of physical oceanography at the University of Oslo in 1979 and a fellow of the Norwegian Academy of Science and Letters in 1988.

He resides at Østerås.
