= Kjell Kristian Rike =

Norwegian sports commentator

== Biography ==
Kjell Kristian Rike
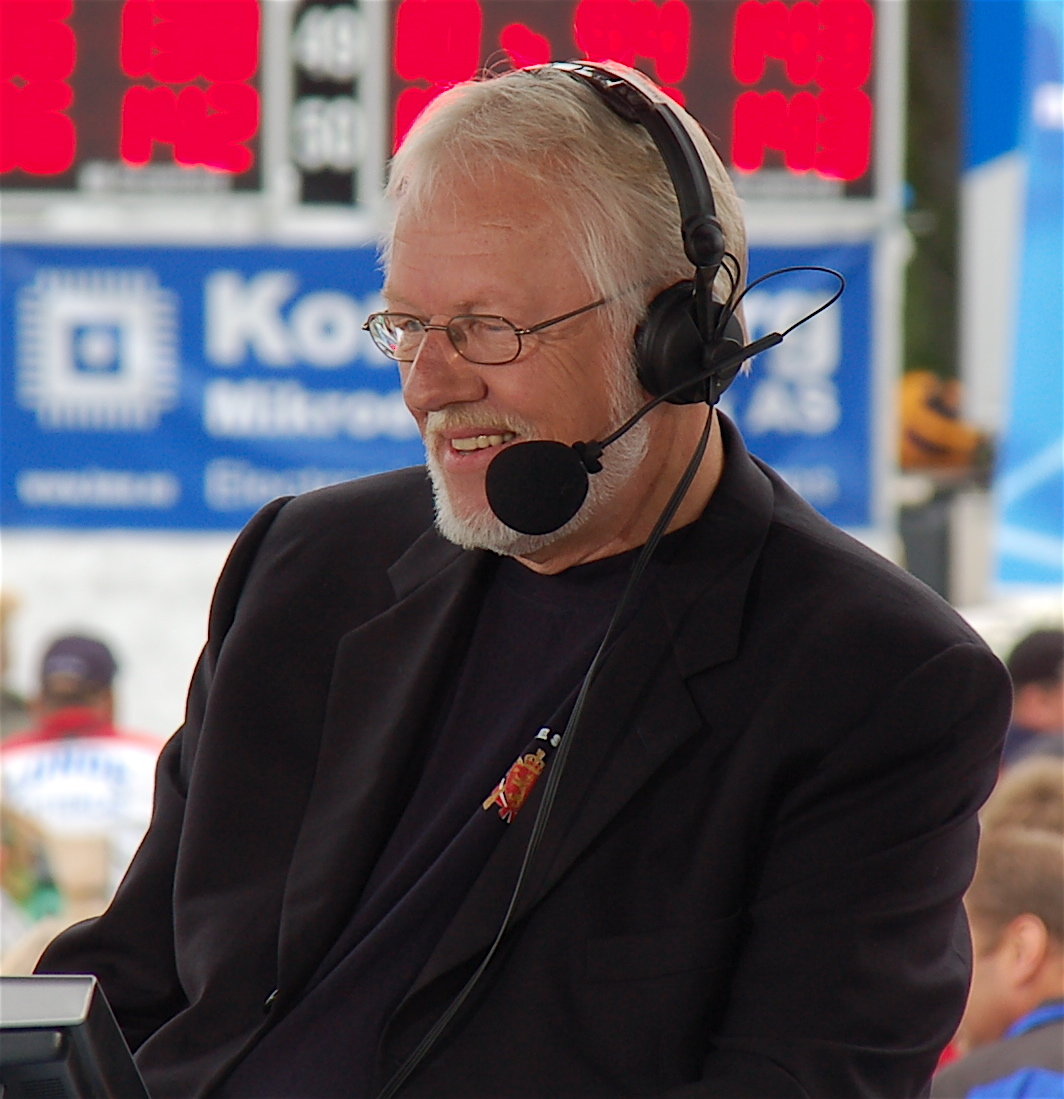
- Rike as most people knew him
- Born: Kjell Kristian Rike; 12 July 1944; Byglandsfjord, Norway
- Died: 19 May 2008 (aged 63); Oslo, Norway
- Awards: Gullruten honorary prize (2007)
- Presenting career
- Show: Various; mostly winter sports
- Station: NRK
- Style: Sports commentator
- Country: Norway
- Previous show: Norge Rundt

Kjell Kristian Rike (12 July 1944 – 19 May 2008) was a Norwegian sports commentator, originally from Byglandsfjord. He reported on biathlon events for NRK starting in 1977, and also on cross-country skiing from 1985.

He was a commentator during several football world championships, and also at golf, cycling, track and field athletics, shooting, harness racing, and alpine skiing events.

Rike was member of the original staff of the long-running TV series Norge rundt in 1976, and is credited for having suggested the signature tune for the program, "Norsk dans nr. 2" by Edvard Grieg.

He was an active sport shooter and a Norwegian champion in 1974.

He died on 19 May 2008, about a month after he was diagnosed with terminal lung cancer. He married his longtime partner, Marit Rosendahl, just a few days after being diagnosed.

== Awards ==
- 2007 Gullruten honorary Norwegian TV industry award (with fellow television sports commentator Jon Herwig Carlsen).
