= Lars Albert Wensell =

Norwegian civil servant and diplomat

Lars Albert Wensell (born 15 January 1944) is a Norwegian diplomat and former ambassador.

He holds the cand.jur. degree and was hired in the Ministry of Foreign Affairs in 1972. He became assistant director general in 1993 before serving as Norway's ambassador to Thailand from 1997 to 2000. Following a period as inspector of the Norwegian foreign service, he was Norway's ambassador to Australia from 2005 to 2009.
