= Bernt Albert =

Norwegian politician (born 1944)

Bernt Albert (born 11 October 1944) is a Norwegian politician for the Conservative Party.

He served as a deputy representative to the Parliament of Norway from Vest-Agder during the term 1969–1973. In total he met during 2 days of parliamentary session.

== See also ==
- List of political parties in Norway
