= Rigmor Kofoed-Larsen =

Norwegian politician (1944–2023)

Rigmor Kofoed-Larsen (22 March 1944 – 22 March 2023) was a Norwegian politician for the Christian Democratic Party.

Kofoed-Larsen was elected to the Norwegian Parliament from Oppland in 1997, but was not re-elected in 2001. She was involved in local politics in Lillehammer municipality council from 1975 to 1995, except the term 1983–1987.

Kofoed-Larsen died in March 2023, at the age of 79.

== Sources ==
- "Rigmor Kofoed-Larsen" (in Norwegian). Storting.
