= Ole T. Berg =

Norwegian political scientist

Ole Trond Berg (born 3 February 1944) is a Norwegian political scientist.

He graduated from the University of Oslo with the mag.art. degree (PhD equivalent) in 1968, and he later took the dr.philos. degree in 1983. He worked as a research fellow at the University of Oslo from 1970 to 1974, and had stays at Yale University from 1973 to 1974 and the University of Minnesota from 1980 to 1981. After a short career as a civil servant in the Ministry of Finance from 1983 to 1985, he returned to academia and was appointed as a professor of health administration at the University of Oslo. He is a member of the Norwegian Academy of Science and Letters.
