= Kåre Olav Berg =

Norwegian Nordic skier

Kåre Olav Berg (April 9, 1944 – February 24, 2007) was a Norwegian Nordic skier who competed in the 1960s and 1970s. Competing as a ski jumper at the 1960 Winter Olympics in Squaw Valley, he finished 13th in the individual large hill event. At the 1968 and 1972 Winter Olympics, Berg competed as a Nordic combined skier, finishing 28th in 1968, and eighth in 1972.
