= Brit Vingelsgaard Ryen =

Norwegian politician (born 1944)

Brit Vingelsgaard Ryen (born 24 November 1944) is a Norwegian politician for the Centre Party.

She served as a deputy representative to the Parliament of Norway from Hedmark during the terms 1985–1989 and 1989–1993. In total she met during 9 days of parliamentary session.
