= Steinar Imsen =

Norwegian historian (born 1944)

Steinar Imsen (born 3 April 1944) is a Norwegian historian, and a professor at the Norwegian University of Science and Technology. His field of concentration is the Late Middle Ages and the Early Modern Period (c. 1300–1700). Imsen has also worked as editor of Norsk historisk leksikon - the Norwegian Historical Encyclopedia.

== Bibliography ==
- Noregs nedgang – short historiography of the Late Middle Ages in Norway (2002) ISBN 82-521-5938-9
- Europa 1300–1550 – textbook on the Late Middle Ages in Europe (2000) ISBN 82-00-45406-1
- Har utgitt bl.a. Norsk historisk leksikon (red., 1974/1999)
- Våre dronninger: fra Ragnhild Eriksdatter til Sonja (1991)
- Senmiddelalderen: emner fra Europas historie 1300–1550 (1984)
- The Norwegian Domination and the Norse World, C.1100-c.1400 (2010)
