= Bjørn Johansen (ice hockey) =

Norwegian ice hockey player

Personal information
- National team: Norway
- Born: 3 February 1944 Oslo, Norway
- Died: 25 March 2025 (aged 81) Oslo, Norway

Sport
- Sport: Ice hockey

Bjørn Johansen (3 February 1944 – 25 March 2025) was a Norwegian ice hockey player. He was born in Oslo, Norway and represented the clubs Rosenhoff IL and Hasle/Løren IL. He played for the Norwegian national ice hockey team, and participated at the Winter Olympics in 1968 and 1972.

Johansen died on 25 March 2025 in Oslo, at the age of 81.
