= Bjørn Ransve =

Bjørn Ransve (born 16 December 1944) is a Norwegian painter and graphical artist. He was born in Oslo. He is represented in several art collections, including the National Gallery of Norway, Lillehammer Art Museum and the Norwegian Museum of Contemporary Art.

In 2023 he was knighted as a Commander of the Order of St. Olav. He resides at Nesøya.
