= Wenche Cumming =

Norwegian politician (born 1944)

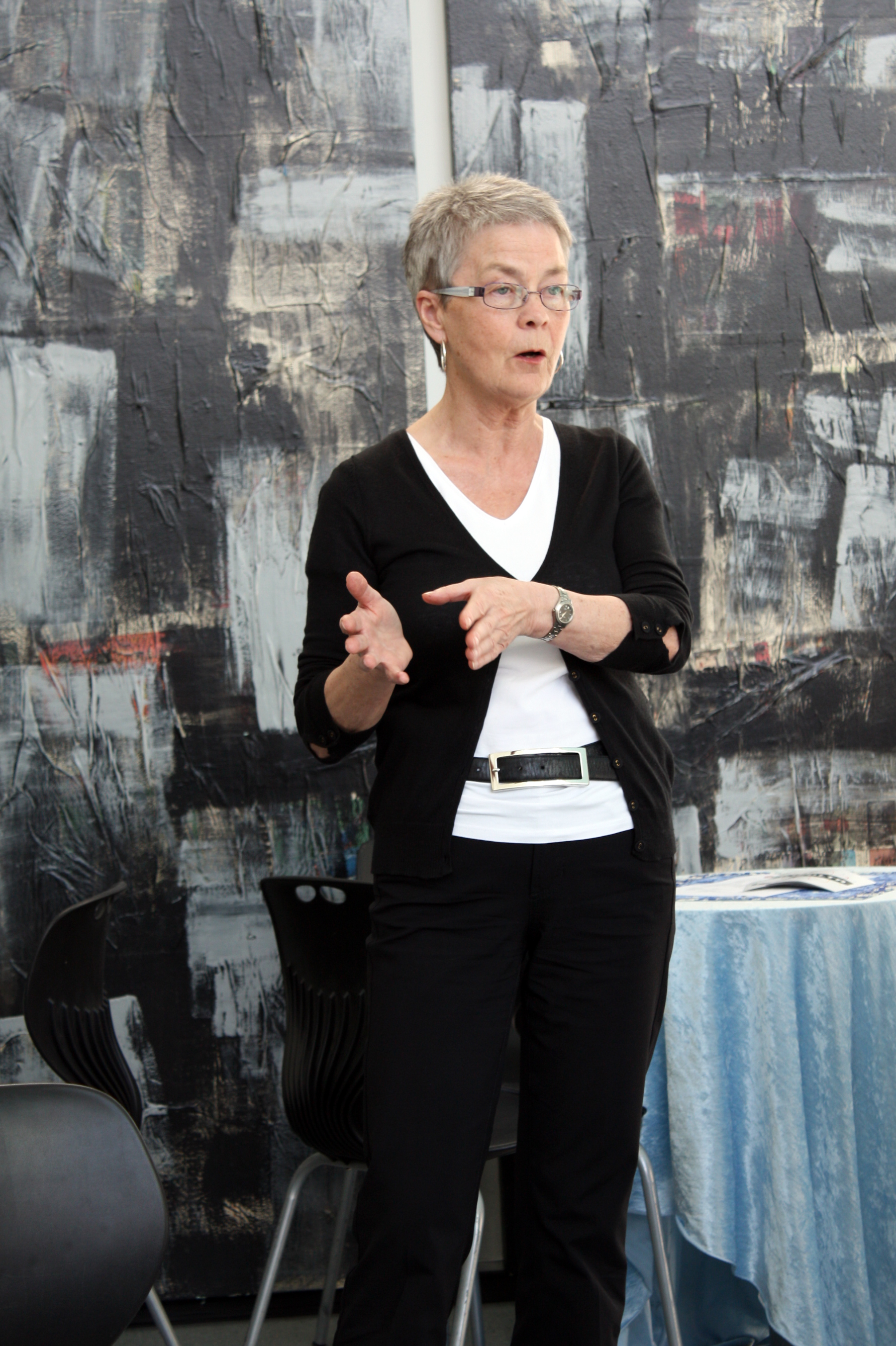
Wenche Cumming

Wenche Cumming (born 2 May 1944) is a Norwegian politician for the Socialist Left Party.

Wenche Cumming was born in Sortland Municipality in Nordland county. She lived in Finnsnes in Troms from 1979. She was both a local councillor and county councillor in Troms and served as a deputy representative to the Norwegian Parliament from Troms for two terms 1989–1993 and 1993–1997. She moved back to Sortland in 2012 and was the leader of the movement opposing petroleum activity of Lofoten, Vesterålen and Senja in 2016–2017.
