= Mona Lyngar =

Norwegian writer (born 1944)

- Born: 6 January 1944 (age 82); Drammen, Norway
- Died: 6 January 2023 (aged 79)
- Occupation: Writer

Mona Lyngar (6 January 1944 – 6 January 2023) was a Norwegian novelist and crime fiction writer.

== Literary career ==
Lyngar made her literary debut in 1966, with a prize-winning contribution to the anthology Gruppe 66, and the novel Ved stupet. The short stories in her collection Ballonger (1967) have a grotesque, absurd or surrealistic nature. In 1970 she published the satirical novel Hull, which depicts viewpoints from various inhabitants of a revenue house. In the novel Ved stupet from 1972 the characters appear like game pieces. She issued the novel Historien om frøken Raubal in 1975, and the short story collection Fra den ene til den andre in 1976. Further novels are Adjutanten from 1981, and Fasadeklatrerne from 1984.

While Lyngar's first novels and short story were written in the style of literary modernism, she subsequently wrote crime fiction stories. These include the short story collection Bare en advarsel from 1982, and the novel Gris from 1985. In 1992 she published the novel Lykkesmeden, and thereafter a trilogy of three novels, Noe å slekte på (1996), Noe å skryte av (2001), and Noe til snakk (2006).

Apart from writing books, Lyngar has worked as freelance writer for newspapers, as well as translator.

== Personal life and education ==
Lyngar was born in Drammen on 6 January 1944, a daughter of physician Eugen Lyngar and Asbjørg Helgeland. She was married to physician Derek Urquhart Sinclair from 1965 to 1968, and to farmer Anders Landet since 1978.

After passing examen artium in 1963, Lyngar studied sociology at the University of Oslo from 1964 to 1966. From 1968 to 1970 she studied theatre in London and Edinburgh.

Lyngar died on 6 January 2023, at the age of 79.
