= Øivind Andersen =

Norwegian philologist

Øivind Andersen (born 12 October 1944) is a Norwegian philologist.

He was born in Oslo, and took the dr.philos. degree in 1976 with the thesis Paradeigmata. Beiträge zum Verständnis der Ilias. He was appointed as a professor at the University of Trondheim in 1980, and from 1989 to 1993 he was the first director of the Norwegian Institute at Athens. In 1997 he became professor at the University of Oslo. He is a member of the Norwegian Academy of Science and Letters.
