= Bjørn Dyrdahl =

Norwegian luger (born 1944)

Personal information
- Born: 27 April 1944 (age 80); Trondheim, Norway

Sport
- Sport: Luge

Bjørn Ingebrigt Dyrdahl (born 27 April 1944) is a Norwegian luger. He was born in Trondheim as the son of Arnold Dyrdahl. He competed at the 1972 Winter Olympics in Sapporo, where he placed 30th in singles.
