= Trygve Retvik =

Norwegian artist

Trygve Retvik (born 15 July 1944 in Lier, Norway) is a Norwegian artist specialised in drawing, painting and printmaking. Retvik is trained and educated both as a teacher and in the fine arts, and has mainly been teaching at the Faculty of Art, Design and Drama at the Oslo University College as associate professor in the fields of drawing, graphics and fine arts didactics. Retvik has studied at the Norwegian National Academy of Craft and Art Industry, the Norwegian National Academy of Fine Arts and the Academy of Fine Arts in Rome, Italy (Accademia di belle arti di Roma).

== Exhibitions ==
Since his debut in 1974 Retvik has had a long string of exhibitions, showing drawings, paintings and prints.

=== Individual exhibitions – a selection ===
- Unge Kunstneres Samfunn, Oslo, Norway, debut 1974
- Groruddalen Kunstforening, Oslo, Norway 1979
- Holmestrand Kunstforening, Holmestrand, Norway 1985
- Ullensaker Kunstforening, Ullensaker, Norway 1986
- Blå Galleri, Oslo, Norway 1988
- Galleri Profil, Bergen, Norway 1991
- Galleri PP 33, Oslo, Norway 2007
- Galleri PP 33, Oslo, Norway 2009
- Galleri PP 33, Oslo, Norway 2010

=== Group- and collective exhibitions - a selection ===
- Moss Kunstgalleri, Moss, Norway 1975
- Unge Kunstneres Samfunn, Erotisk kunst, Oslo, Norway 1976
- Galleri 27, Oslo, Norway 1977
- Galleri F 15, Ung 85, nordisk temautstilling, Moss, Norway 1985
- Norske Grafikere i Litauen, Lithuania 1988
- Ås Kunstforening, Jubileumsutstilling, Ås, Norway 1990
- Galleri Aske, Oslo, Norway 1993
- Premio Mestre, Venezia, Italy 2009
- Høstutstillingen, Oslo, Norway
- Østlandsutstillingen, Oslo, Norway
- Unge Kunstneres Samfunns Vårutstilling, Oslo, Norway

== Works ==
- Tegning som uttrykk (1998)
