= Jon Herwig Carlsen =

Norwegian sports commentator (1937–2022)

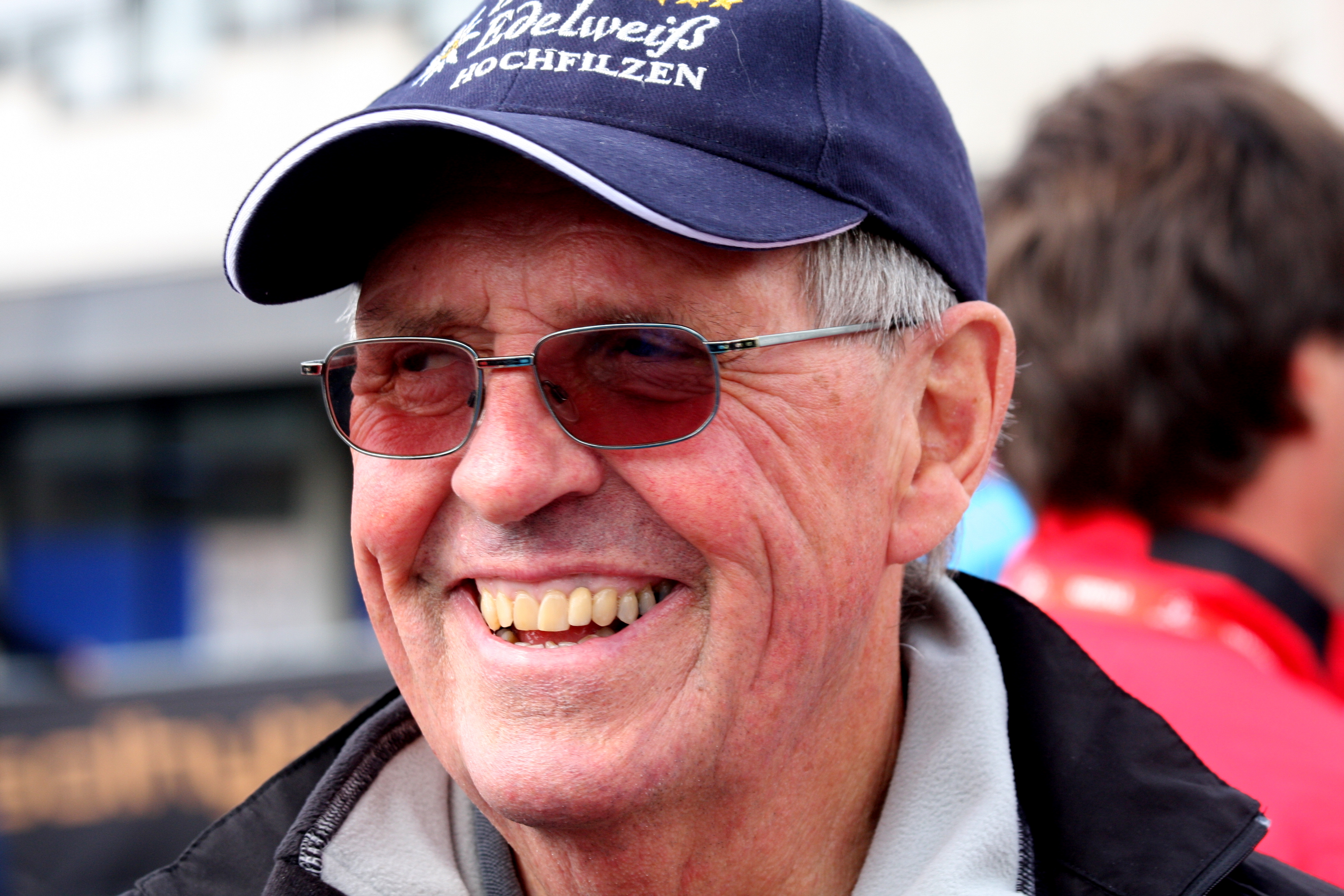
- Carlsen in 2009
- Born: 15 April 1937
- Died: 10 April 2022 (aged 84)
- Occupation: Sports commentator
- Years active: 1967–2011
- Awards: Gullruten honorary prize (2007)

Jon Herwig Carlsen (15 April 1937 – 10 April 2022) was a Norwegian sports commentator.

== Career ==
Born on 15 April 1937, Carlsen grew up in Oslo, and was a teacher by education. He worked for NRK from 1967 to 2011, first in the traffic section, and later as a sports commentator. His specialities were cross country skiing and biathlon.

He was awarded the Gullruten honorary award in 2007, along with fellow sports commentator Kjell Kristian Rike. He died on 10 April 2022, at the age of 84.
