= Bjørn Myrseth =

Norwegian biologist and businessperson

Bjørn Myrseth (born 1944) is a Norwegian biologist and businessperson, and since 1987 chief executive officer of Marine Farms. Myrseth was educated in fishery biology from the University of Bergen, and was a co-founder of Stolt Sea Farms in 1972, where he was CEO until 1987. He then sold his stake in the company, and founded Marine Farms, where he continues as CEO.
