= Trygve Bruvik =

Norwegian engineer and businessperson (born 1952)

- Born: 1952 (age 73–74)
- Education: Bergen College of Engineering
- Occupation: businessperson

Trygve Bruvik (born 1952) is a Norwegian engineer and businessperson.

Bruvik was educated with an engineering degree from Bergen College of Engineering, as well as a business administration degree from BI Norwegian Business School. He worked for Vesta Forsikring from 1981, and was chief executive officer from 1994 to 2002. Since 2003 he has been chair of Marine Farms.
