= Erik Fjeldstad =

Norwegian ice hockey player (1944–2019)

Personal information
- Nationality: Norwegian
- Born: 20 February 1944 Oslo, Norway
- Died: 24 March 2019 (aged 75)

Sport
- Sport: Ice hockey
- Club: Rosenhoff IL

Svein Erik Fjeldstad (February 20, 1944 – March 24, 2019) was a Norwegian ice hockey player. He played for the Norwegian national ice hockey team, and participated at the Winter Olympics in 1964, where he placed tenth with the Norwegian team.
