= Tom Christensen (ice hockey) =

Norwegian ice hockey player

Personal information
- Born: 1 August 1944 (age 80); Oslo, Norway

Sport
- Sport: Ice hockey

Tom Christensen (born 1 August 1944) is a Norwegian ice hockey player. He was born in Oslo, Norway and represented the club Vålerengens IF. He played for the Norwegian national ice hockey team, and participated at the Winter Olympics in Sapporo in 1972, where the Norwegian team placed 8th.
