= Truls Olav Winther =

Norwegian literary scholar

- Born: 30 June 1944; Halden
- Died: 6 September 2024 (aged 80); Bergen
- Education: University of Oslo
- Occupation: Literary scholar
- Employer(s): University of Oslo; University of Bergen

Truls Olav Winther (30 June 1944 – 6 September 2024) was a Norwegian literary scholar.

== Life and career ==
Born on 30 June 1944, Winther graduated as cand.mag. from the University of Oslo in 1969, and as dr.philos. in 1974. He was appointed professor of French literature at the University of Oslo in 1986. He was appointed professor at the University of Bergen in 1994.

His specialities were French philosophy and history of ideas, in particular the philosopher Henri Bergson. He also specialized in the works of poet and dramatist Paul Claudel.

His publications include the essays collection Tausheten og ordet from 1972, Mening og mysterium – om Paul Claudels L'Annonce faite à Marie from 1976, Det skapende menneske from 1978, about the philosophy of Henri Bergson, and Den franske klassisisme – menneskebilde og litteratursyn from 1980.

Winther died in Bergen on 6 September 2024, at the age of 80.
