= Jan Kinder =

Norwegian ice hockey player

Jan Runar Kinder (26 May 1944 – 25 May 2013) was a Norwegian ice hockey player. He was born in Oslo, Norway and represented the club Hasle/Løren IL. He played for the Norwegian national ice hockey team, and participated at the Winter Olympics in Sapporo in 1972, where the Norwegian team placed 8th.
