= Bøkfjord Bridge =

Bøkfjord Bridge Bøkfjordbrua
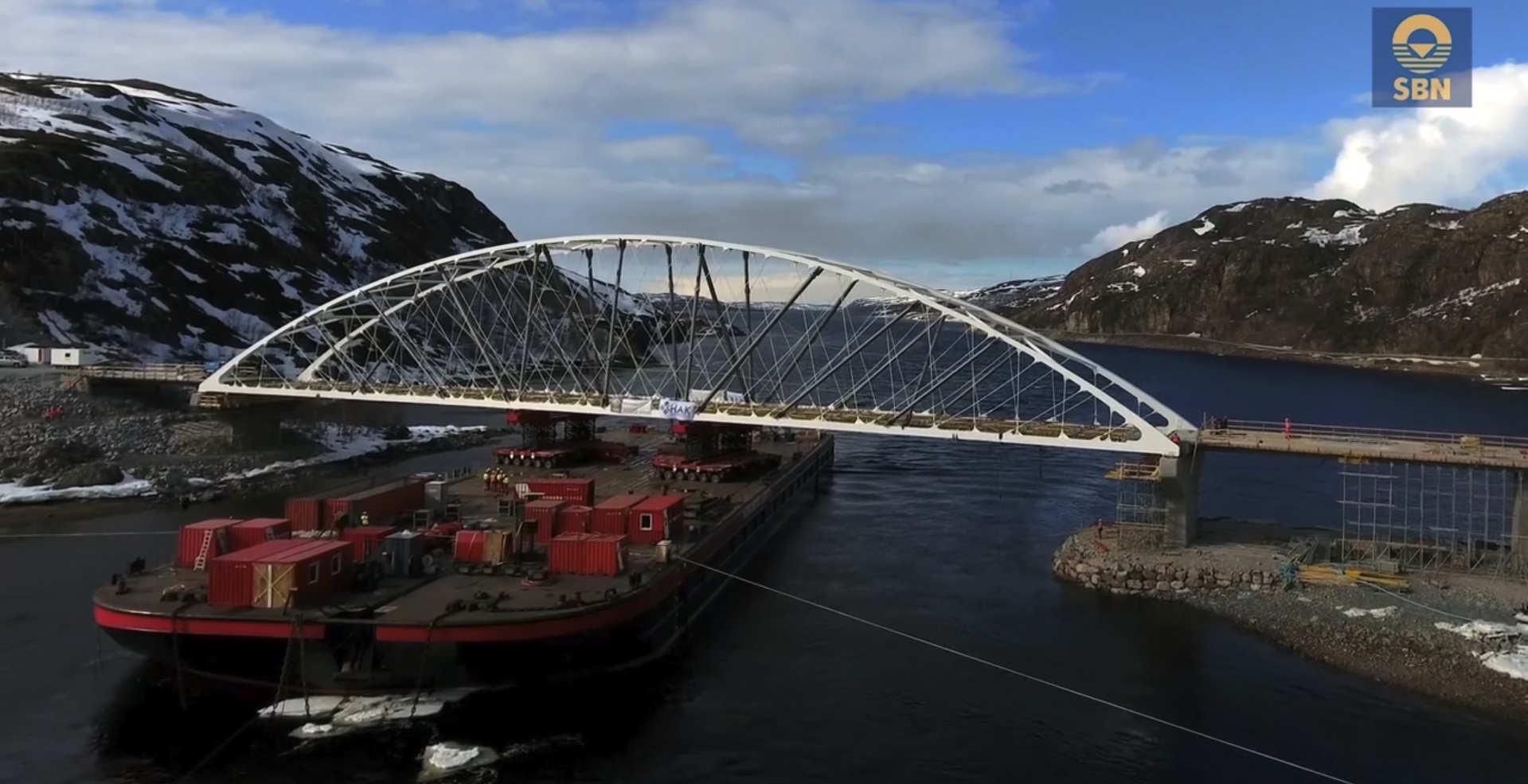
- The bridge being mounted on location
- Coordinates: 69°40′53″N 30°6′36″E
- Carries: European route E105
- Crosses: Paatsjoki (Pasvikelva)
- Locale: Sør-Varanger Municipality
- Named for: Bøkfjorden

Characteristics
- Total length: 284 m (932 ft)
- Longest span: 120 m (390 ft)
- No. of lanes: 1+1 (no barrier)

History
- Constructed by: Schachtbau Nordhausen Stahlbau GmbH and HAK Entreprenør AS
- Inaugurated: 29 September 2017
- Replaces: Elvenes bru

Statistics
- Toll: no

Location
- Interactive map of Bøkfjord Bridge

Bøkfjord Bridge (Norwegian: Bøkfjordbrua) is a road bridge which crosses the Paatsjoki river at its mouth into Bøkfjord, in Sør-Varanger Municipality in Finnmark county, Norway.

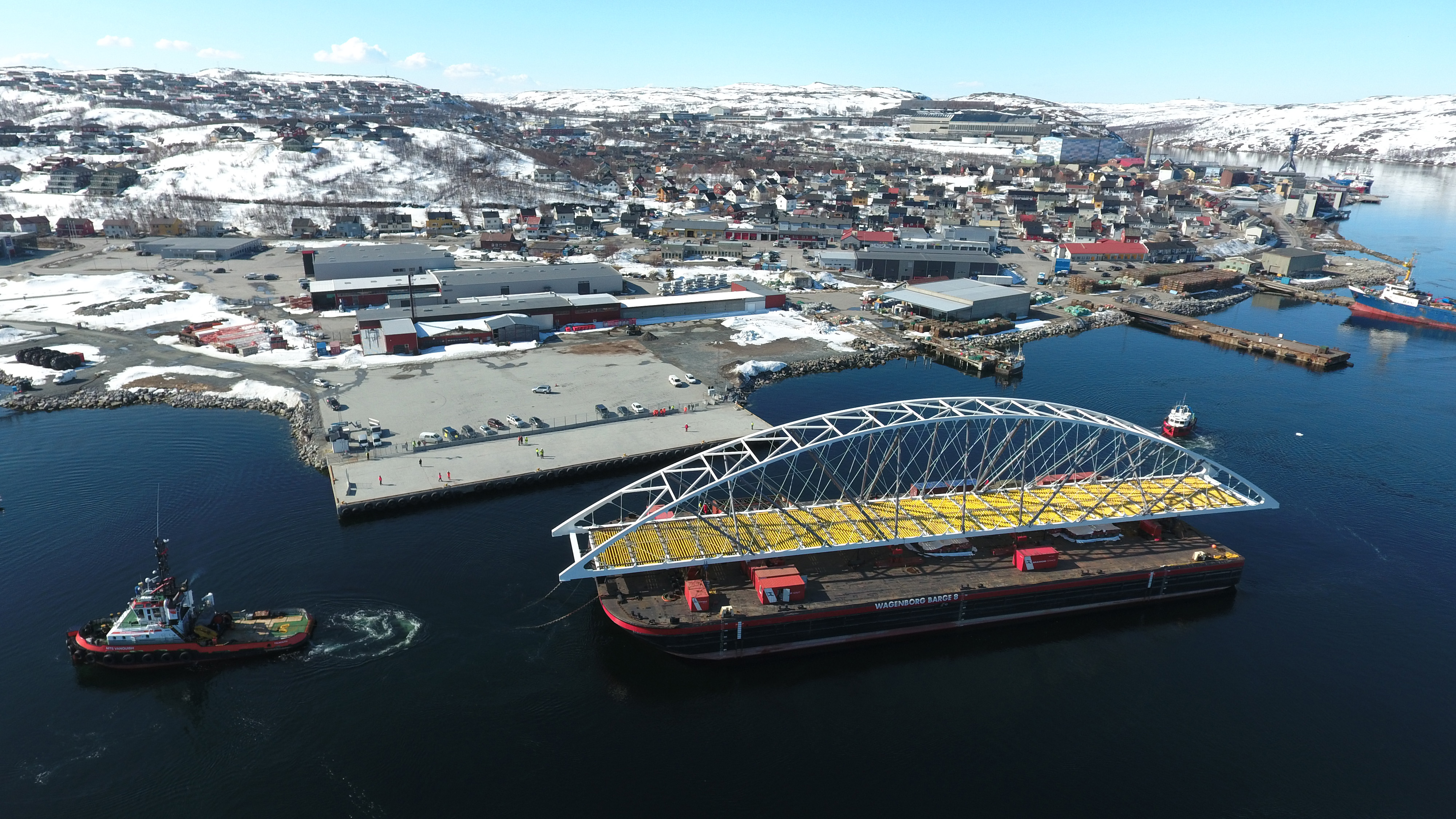
The bridge being transported

The main bridge was built in parts in Nordhausen, Germany, assembled in Wilhelmshaven, Germany and transported by barge to the place. It was put into place on 20 May 2017.

It was opened for traffic on 28 September 2017, inaugurated by the minister of transport Ketil Solvik-Olsen (Norway) and vice minister of transport Sergey Aristov (Russia), who also marked the opening of other new roads on the cross-border E105 between Kirkenes and Zapolyarny. It replaced the old, low and narrow Elvenes Bridge.
