= Jarmund Øyen =

Norwegian politician (born 1944)

Jarmund Øyen (born 6 March 1944) is a Norwegian politician for the Labour Party.

He served as a deputy representative to the Norwegian Parliament from Oppland during the terms 1993–1997 and 1997–2001. In total he met during 3 days of parliamentary session.
