= Sverre Mitsem (judge) =

Norwegian judge

Sverre Mitsem (3 July 1944 – 18 October 2005) was a Norwegian judge.

He was born in Oslo. He worked as a lawyer for the Norwegian Confederation of Trade Unions from 1981, as a judge in Asker and Bærum District Court from 1986, presiding judge in Eidsivating Court of Appeal from 1991 and in Borgarting Court of Appeal from 1995, and as a Supreme Court Justice from 2002 to his death.
