= Bjørn Elvenes =

Norwegian ice hockey player

Personal information
- Born: 12 June 1944 Oslo, Norway
- Died: 19 August 1988 (aged 44) Lund, Sweden

Sport
- Sport: Ice Hockey

Bjørn Elvenes (12 June 1944 – 19 August 1988) was a Norwegian ice hockey player, born in Oslo. He played for the Norwegian national ice hockey team, and participated at the Winter Olympics in 1964, where he placed tenth with the Norwegian team. There are conflicting reports of his death in 1988; he either died of cancer or was killed in a car accident.
