= Arne Holen =

Norwegian musicologist

Arne Holen (born 19 June 1944) is a Norwegian musicologist.

He was born in Asker, and took his degree in musicology in 1969. He was an associate professor at the University of Trondheim from 1974 to 1983, and was the director of Concerts Norway from 1983 to 1993. He was then hired by the Norwegian Ministry of Culture.
