= East Germany at the 1976 Winter Olympics =

- IOC code: GDR
- NOC: National Olympic Committee of the German Democratic Republic

in Innsbruck
- Competitors: 59 (40 men, 19 women) in 8 sports
- Flag bearer: Meinhard Nehmer (bobsleigh)
- Medals Ranked 2nd: Gold 7 Silver 5 Bronze 7 Total 19

Winter Olympics appearances (overview)
- 1968; 1972; 1976; 1980; 1984; 1988

Other related appearances
- Germany (1928–1936, 1952, 1992–pres.); United Team of Germany (1956–1964)

East Germany (German Democratic Republic) competed at the 1976 Winter Olympics in Innsbruck, Austria.

== Medalists ==
| Medal | Name | Sport | Event |
|---|---|---|---|
| Gold | Meinhard Nehmer; Bernhard Germeshausen | Bobsleigh | Two-man |
| Gold | Meinhard Nehmer; Jochen Babock; Bernhard Germeshausen; Bernhard Lehmann | Bobsleigh | Four-man |
| Gold | Dettlef Günther | Luge | Men's individual |
| Gold | Hans Rinn; Norbert Hahn | Luge | Men's doubles |
| Gold | Margit Schumann | Luge | Women's individual |
| Gold | Ulrich Wehling | Nordic combined | Men's individual |
| Gold | Hans-Georg Aschenbach | Ski jumping | Men's normal hill |
| Silver | Gert-Dietmar Klause | Cross-country skiing | Men's 50 km |
| Silver | Romy Kermer; Rolf Österreich | Figure skating | Pairs |
| Silver | Ute Rührold | Luge | Women's individual |
| Silver | Jochen Danneberg | Ski jumping | Men's normal hill |
| Silver | Andrea Ehrig-Schöne-Mitscherlich | Speed skating | Women's 3000m |
| Bronze | Karl-Heinz Menz; Frank Ullrich; Manfred Beer; Manfred Geyer | Biathlon | Men's 4 x 7.5 km relay |
| Bronze | Monika Debertshäuser; Sigrun Krause; Barbara Petzold; Veronika Hesse-Schmidt | Cross-country skiing | Women's 4 × 5 km relay |
| Bronze | Christine Errath | Figure skating | Women's singles |
| Bronze | Manuela Groß; Uwe Kagelmann | Figure skating | Pairs |
| Bronze | Hans Rinn | Luge | Men's individual |
| Bronze | Konrad Winkler | Nordic combined | Men's individual |
| Bronze | Henry Glaß | Ski jumping | Men's large hill |

== Biathlon ==
Men

| Event | Athlete | Time | Penalties | Adjusted time ^{1} | Rank |
|---|---|---|---|---|---|
| 20 km | Manfred Beer | 1'18:42.50 | 5 | 1'23:42.50 | 27 |
| 20 km | Karl-Heinz Wolf | 1'15:06.89 | 5 | 1'20:06.89 | 15 |
| 20 km | Manfred Geyer | 1'13:11.37 | 6 | 1'19:11.37 | 12 |

^{1} One minute added per close miss (a hit in the outer ring), two minutes added per complete miss.

Men's 4 x 7.5 km relay

| Athletes | Race | | |
| Athletes | Misses ^{2} | Time | Rank |
|---|---|---|---|
| Karl-Heinz Menz; Frank Ullrich; Manfred Beer; Manfred Geyer | 5 | 2'04:08.61 | 3rd place, bronze medalist(s) |

^{2} A penalty loop of 200 metres had to be skied per missed target.

== Bobsleigh ==
| Sled | Athletes | Event | Run 1 | | Run 2 | | Run 3 | | Run 4 | | Total | |
| Sled | Athletes | Event | Time | Rank | Time | Rank | Time | Rank | Time | Rank | Time | Rank |
|---|---|---|---|---|---|---|---|---|---|---|---|---|
| GDR-1 | Horst Schönau; Raimund Bethge | Two-man | 56.89 | 8 | 56.79 | 8 | 56.74 | 7 | 56.55 | 4 | 3:46.97 | 7 |
| GDR-2 | Meinhard Nehmer; Bernhard Germeshausen | Two-man | 56.24 | 3 | 56.04 | 1 | 55.87 | 1 | 56.27 | 1 | 3:44.42 | 1st place, gold medalist(s) |

| Sled | Athletes | Event | Run 1 | | Run 2 | | Run 3 | | Run 4 | | Total | |
| Sled | Athletes | Event | Time | Rank | Time | Rank | Time | Rank | Time | Rank | Time | Rank |
|---|---|---|---|---|---|---|---|---|---|---|---|---|
| GDR-1 | Meinhard Nehmer; Jochen Babock; Bernhard Germeshausen; Bernhard Lehmann | Four-man | 54.43 | 1 | 54.64 | 1 | 55.51 | 2 | 55.85 | 2 | 3:40.43 | 1st place, gold medalist(s) |
| GDR-2 | Horst Schönau; Horst Bernhardt; Harald Seifert; Raimund Bethge | Four-man | 55.11 | 6 | 55.12 | 5 | 55.63 | 4 | 56.58 | 4 | 3:42.44 | 4 |

== Cross-country skiing ==
Men

| Event | Athlete | Race | |
| Event | Athlete | Time | Rank |
|---|---|---|---|
| 15 km | Gerhard Grimmer | 48:45.04 | 49 |
| 15 km | Gerd Heßler | 47:08.77 | 28 |
| 15 km | Jürgen Wolf | 47:04.49 | 25 |
| 15 km | Gert-Dietmar Klause | 45:42.97 | 9 |
| 30 km | Dieter Meinel | 1'36:37.35 | 33 |
| 30 km | Axel Lesser | 1'34:53.14 | 17 |
| 30 km | Gerhard Grimmer | 1'34:52.15 | 16 |
| 30 km | Gert-Dietmar Klause | 1'32:00.91 | 6 |
| 50 km | Dieter Meinel | 2'49:52.42 | 33 |
| 50 km | Gerd Heßler | 2'47:34.90 | 28 |
| 50 km | Gerhard Grimmer | 2'41:15.46 | 5 |
| 50 km | Gert-Dietmar Klause | 2'38:13.21 | 2nd place, silver medalist(s) |

Men's 4 × 10 km relay

| Athletes | Race | |
| Athletes | Time | Rank |
|---|---|---|
| Gerd Heßler; Axel Lesser; Gerhard Grimmer; Gert-Dietmar Klause | DNF | – |

Women

| Event | Athlete | Race | |
| Event | Athlete | Time | Rank |
|---|---|---|---|
| 5 km | Sigrun Krause | 16:55.54 | 16 |
| 5 km | Veronika Hesse-Schmidt | 16:42.86 | 12 |
| 5 km | Barbara Petzold | 16:42.44 | 11 |
| 5 km | Monika Debertshäuser | 16:34.94 | 7 |
| 10 km | Monika Debertshäuser | 31:50.06 | 14 |
| 10 km | Sigrun Krause | 31:39.76 | 12 |
| 10 km | Veronika Hesse-Schmidt | 31:12.33 | 8 |
| 10 km | Barbara Petzold | 31:12.20 | 7 |

Women's 4 × 5 km relay

| Athletes | Race | |
| Athletes | Time | Rank |
|---|---|---|
| Monika Debertshäuser; Sigrun Krause; Barbara Petzold; Veronika Hesse-Schmidt | 1'09:57.95 | 3rd place, bronze medalist(s) |

== Figure skating ==
Men

| Athlete | CF | SP | FS | Points | Places | Rank |
|---|---|---|---|---|---|---|
| Jan Hoffmann | 4 | 9 | 5 | 187.34 | 34 | 4 |

Women

| Athlete | CF | SP | FS | Points | Places | Rank |
|---|---|---|---|---|---|---|
| Marion Weber | 12 | 9 | 10 | 175.82 | 99 | 11 |
| Anett Pötzsch | 4 | 3 | 4 | 187.42 | 33 | 4 |
| Christine Errath | 5 | 2 | 3 | 188.16 | 28 | 3rd place, bronze medalist(s) |

Pairs

| Athletes | SP | FS | Points | Places | Rank |
|---|---|---|---|---|---|
| Kerstin Stolfig; Veit Kempe | 7 | 6 | 129.57 | 59 | 6 |
| Manuela Groß; Uwe Kagelmann | 4 | 3 | 134.57 | 34 | 3rd place, bronze medalist(s) |
| Romy Kermer; Rolf Österreich | 2 | 2 | 136.35 | 21 | 2nd place, silver medalist(s) |

== Luge ==
Men

| Athlete | Run 1 | | Run 2 | | Run 3 | | Run 4 | | Total | |
| Athlete | Time | Rank | Time | Rank | Time | Rank | Time | Rank | Time | Rank |
|---|---|---|---|---|---|---|---|---|---|---|
| Hans Rinn | 52.916 | 6 | 51.968 | 2 | 51.690 | 2 | 52.000 | 3 | 3:28.574 | 3rd place, bronze medalist(s) |
| Hans-Heinrich Winckler | 52.848 | 5 | 52.328 | 6 | 52.069 | 4 | 52.209 | 4 | 3:29.454 | 4 |
| Dettlef Günther | 52.381 | 1 | 52.107 | 4 | 51.418 | 1 | 51.782 | 1 | 3:27.688 | 1st place, gold medalist(s) |

(Men's) Doubles

| Athletes | Run 1 | | Run 2 | | Total | |
| Athletes | Time | Rank | Time | Rank | Time | Rank |
|---|---|---|---|---|---|---|
| Hans Rinn; Norbert Hahn | 42.773 | 1 | 42.831 | 1 | 1:25.604 | 1st place, gold medalist(s) |
| Bernd Hahn; Ulli Hahn | 43.291 | 6 | 46.566 | 24 | 1:29.847 | 16 |

Women

| Athlete | Run 1 | | Run 2 | | Run 3 | | Run 4 | | Total | |
| Athlete | Time | Rank | Time | Rank | Time | Rank | Time | Rank | Time | Rank |
|---|---|---|---|---|---|---|---|---|---|---|
| Eva-Maria Wernicke | 43.007 | 5 | 42.646 | 2 | 42.711 | 7 | 42.898 | 4 | 2:51.262 | 4 |
| Ute Rührold | 42.926 | 3 | 42.708 | 3 | 42.439 | 3 | 42.773 | 2 | 2:50.846 | 2nd place, silver medalist(s) |
| Margit Schumann | 42.854 | 1 | 42.830 | 7 | 42.285 | 1 | 42.652 | 1 | 2:50.621 | 1st place, gold medalist(s) |

== Nordic combined ==
Events:

- normal hill ski jumping (Three jumps, best two counted and shown here.)
- 15 km cross-country skiing

| Athlete | Event | Ski Jumping | | | | Cross-country | | | Total | |
| Athlete | Event | Distance 1 | Distance 2 | Points | Rank | Time | Points | Rank | Points | Rank |
|---|---|---|---|---|---|---|---|---|---|---|
| Konrad Winkler | Individual | 74.5 | 77.0 | 213.9 | 4 | 49:51.11 | 203.57 | 7 | 417.47 | 3rd place, bronze medalist(s) |
| Günter Deckert | Individual | 71.0 | 74.0 | 194.2 | 18 | 49:51.00 | 203.58 | 6 | 397.78 | 13 |
| Claus Tuchscherer | Individual | 78.5 | 79.0 | 218.7 | 3 | 51:16.12 | 190.81 | 20 | 409.51 | 5 |
| Ulrich Wehling | Individual | 80.0 | 80.5 | 225.5 | 1 | 50:28.95 | 197.89 | 13 | 423.39 | 1st place, gold medalist(s) |

== Ski jumping ==
| Athlete | Event | Jump 1 | | Jump 2 | | Total | |
| Athlete | Event | Distance | Points | Distance | Points | Points | Rank |
|---|---|---|---|---|---|---|---|
| Henry Glaß | Normal hill | 80.0 | 118.3 | 79.5 (fall) | 85.5 | 203.8 | 44 |
| Bernd Eckstein | Normal hill | 80.5 | 118.6 | 81.5 (fall) | 90.7 | 209.3 | 32 |
| Jochen Danneberg | Normal hill | 83.5 | 124.4 | 82.5 | 121.8 | 246.2 | 2nd place, silver medalist(s) |
| Hans-Georg Aschenbach | Normal hill | 84.5 | 128.0 | 82.0 | 124.0 | 252.0 | 1st place, gold medalist(s) |
| Henry Glaß | Large hill | 91.0 | 104.4 | 97.0 | 117.3 | 221.7 | 3rd place, bronze medalist(s) |
| Hans-Georg Aschenbach | Large hill | 92.5 | 109.5 | 89.0 | 102.6 | 212.1 | 8 |
| Bernd Eckstein | Large hill | 94.0 | 109.6 | 91.5 | 106.6 | 216.2 | 7 |
| Jochen Danneberg | Large hill | 102.0 | 118.8 | 89.5 | 102.8 | 221.6 | 4 |

== Speed skating ==
Men

| Event | Athlete | Race | |
| Event | Athlete | Time | Rank |
|---|---|---|---|
| 500 m | Harald Oehme | 41.54 | 24 |
| 1000 m | Harald Oehme | 1:23.88 | 20 |
| 1000 m | Klaus Wunderlich | 1:21.67 | 10 |
| 1500 m | Klaus Wunderlich | 2:03.41 | 9 |
| 5000 m | Manfred Winter | 7:58.28 | 18 |
| 5000 m | Klaus Wunderlich | 7:33.82 | 5 |

Women

| Event | Athlete | Race | |
| Event | Athlete | Time | Rank |
|---|---|---|---|
| 500 m | Ute Dix | 45.60 | 20 |
| 500 m | Ines Bautzmann | 44.87 | 15 |
| 500 m | Heike Lange | 44.21 | 10 |
| 1000 m | Ute Dix | 1:34.14 | 21 |
| 1000 m | Monika Zernicek | 1:31.68 | 12 |
| 1000 m | Heike Lange | 1:30.55 | 8 |
| 1500 m | Andrea Ehrig-Schöne-Mitscherlich | 2:20.05 | 10 |
| 1500 m | Ines Bautzmann | 2:19.63 | 7 |
| 1500 m | Karin Kessow | 2:19.05 | 5 |
| 3000 m | Ines Bautzmann | 4:46.67 | 5 |
| 3000 m | Karin Kessow | 4:45.60 | 4 |
| 3000 m | Andrea Ehrig-Schöne-Mitscherlich | 4:45.23 | 2nd place, silver medalist(s) |
