= East Germany at the 1972 Winter Olympics =

- IOC code: GDR
- NOC: National Olympic Committee of the German Democratic Republic

in Sapporo
- Competitors: 42 (29 men, 13 women) in 7 sports
- Flag bearer: Klaus Bonsack (luge)
- Medals Ranked 2nd: Gold 4 Silver 3 Bronze 7 Total 14

Winter Olympics appearances (overview)
- 1968; 1972; 1976; 1980; 1984; 1988

Other related appearances
- Germany (1928–1936, 1952, 1992–pres.); United Team of Germany (1956–1964)

East Germany (German Democratic Republic) competed at the 1972 Winter Olympics in Sapporo, Japan.

== Medalists ==
Medal	Name	Sport	Event
Gold	Wolfgang Scheidel	Luge	Men's individual
Gold	Horst Hörnlein; Reinhard Bredow	Luge	Men's doubles
Gold	Anna-Maria Müller	Luge	Women's individual
Gold	Ulrich Wehling	Nordic combined	Men's individual
Silver	Hansjörg Knauthe	Biathlon	Men's 20 km
Silver	Harald Ehrig	Luge	Men's individual
Silver	Ute Rührold	Luge	Women's individual
Bronze	Hansjörg Knauthe; Joachim Meischner; Dieter Speer; Horst Koschka	Biathlon	Men's 4 x 7.5 km relay
Bronze	Manuela Groß; Uwe Kagelmann	Figure skating	Pairs
Bronze	Wolfram Fiedler	Luge	Men's individual
Bronze	Klaus-Michael Bonsack; Wolfram Fiedler	Luge	Men's doubles
Bronze	Margit Schumann	Luge	Women's individual
Bronze	Karl-Heinz Luck	Nordic combined	Men's individual
Bronze	Rainer Schmidt	Ski jumping	Men's large hill

== Biathlon ==
Men

Event	Athlete	Time	Penalties	Adjusted time ^{1}	Rank
20 km	Horst Koschka	1'17:24.58	5	1'22:24.58	20
20 km	Günther Bartnick	1'16:01.73	5	1'21:01.73	15
20 km	Dieter Speer	1'13:43.63	7	1'20:43.63	13
20 km	Hansjörg Knauthe	1'15:07.60	1	1'16:07.60	2nd place, silver medalist(s)

^{1} One minute added per close miss (a hit in the outer ring), two minutes added per complete miss.

Men's 4 x 7.5 km relay

Athletes	Race		
Athletes	Misses ^{2}	Time	Rank
Hansjörg Knauthe; Joachim Meischner; Dieter Speer; Horst Koschka	4	1'54:57.67	3rd place, bronze medalist(s)

^{2} A penalty loop of 200 metres had to be skied per missed target.

== Cross-country skiing ==
Men

Event	Athlete	Race	
Event	Athlete	Time	Rank
15 km	Rainer Groß	48:05.86	26
15 km	Gerd Heßler	48:04.15	25
15 km	Gert-Dietmar Klause	46:34.40	13
15 km	Axel Lesser	46:17.01	6
30 km	Eberhard Klessen	1'43:15.99	27
30 km	Gerd Heßler	1'41:37.47	18
30 km	Axel Lesser	1'39:49.24	12
30 km	Gert-Dietmar Klause	1'39:15.54	8
50 km	Rainer Groß	2'50:16.91	18
50 km	Eberhard Klessen	2'49:53.01	16
50 km	Gert-Dietmar Klause	2'46:17.43	9

Men's 4 × 10 km relay

Athletes	Race	
Athletes	Time	Rank
Gerd Heßler; Axel Lesser; Gerhard Grimmer; Gert-Dietmar Klause	2'10:03.73	6

Women

Event	Athlete	Race	
Event	Athlete	Time	Rank
5 km	Christine Phillip	18:17.02	30
5 km	Anni Unger	18:13.19	28
5 km	Gabriele Haupt	17:55.04	20
5 km	Renate Fischer-Köhler	17:41.07	14
10 km	Christine Phillip	37:51.76	31
10 km	Anni Unger	36:45.24	20
10 km	Gabriele Haupt	36:38.41	18
10 km	Renate Fischer-Köhler	35:46.96	9

Women's 3 × 5 km relay

Athletes	Race	
Athletes	Time	Rank
Gabriele Haupt; Renate Fischer-Köhler; Anni Unger	50:28.45	5

== Figure skating ==
Men

Athlete	CF	FS	Points	Places	Rank
Jan Hoffmann	4	10	2567.6	55	6

Women

Athlete	CF	FS	Points	Places	Rank
Christine Errath	11	5	2489.3	78	8
Sonja Morgenstern	8	3	2579.4	53	6

Pairs

Athletes	SP	FS	Points	Places	Rank
Annette Kansy; Axel Salzmann	7	8	392.6	68	8
Manuela Groß; Uwe Kagelmann	3	3	411.8	29	3rd place, bronze medalist(s)

== Luge ==
Men

Athlete	Run 1		Run 2		Run 3		Run 4		Total	
Athlete	Time	Rank	Time	Rank	Time	Rank	Time	Rank	Time	Rank
Wolfram Fiedler	53.04	6	52.55	3	51.61	3	51.77	3	3:28.73	3rd place, bronze medalist(s)
Klaus-Michael Bonsack	52.98	3	52.72	4	51.54	1	51.92	5	3:29.16	4
Harald Ehrig	52.60	2	52.32	2	51.74	4	51.73	2	3:28.39	2nd place, silver medalist(s)
Wolfgang Scheidel	52.17	1	52.06	1	51.58	2	51.53	1	3:27.58	1st place, gold medalist(s)

(Men's) Doubles

Athletes	Run 1		Run 2		Total	
Athletes	Time	Rank	Time	Rank	Time	Rank
Horst Hörnlein; Reinhard Bredow	44.27	2	44.08	1	1:28.35	1st place, gold medalist(s)
Klaus-Michael Bonsack; Wolfram Fiedler	44.69	3	44.47	3	1:29.16	3rd place, bronze medalist(s)

Women

Athlete	Run 1		Run 2		Run 3		Run 4		Total	
Athlete	Time	Rank	Time	Rank	Time	Rank	Time	Rank	Time	Rank
Anna-Maria Müller	45.00	3	45.00	1	44.86	3	44.32	1	2:59.18	1st place, gold medalist(s)
Ute Rührold	44.95	1	45.23	2	44.76	2	44.55	2	2:59.49	2nd place, silver medalist(s)
Margit Schumann	44.95	1	45.38	3	44.65	1	44.56	3	2:59.54	3rd place, bronze medalist(s)

== Nordic combined ==
Events:

- normal hill ski jumping (Three jumps, best two counted and shown here.)
- 15 km cross-country skiing

Athlete	Event	Ski Jumping				Cross-country			Total	
Athlete	Event	Distance 1	Distance 2	Points	Rank	Time	Points	Rank	Points	Rank
Karl-Heinz Luck	Individual	69.5	74.0	178.8	17	48:24.9	220.000	1	398.800	3rd place, bronze medalist(s)
Hans Hartleb	Individual	74.0	73.0	183.9	11	52:14.2	185.605	28	369.505	18
Ulrich Wehling	Individual	78.0	76.5	200.9	4	49:15.3	212.440	3	413.340	1st place, gold medalist(s)
Günter Deckert	Individual	78.5	83.0	183.4	12	50:41.1	199.570	10	385.970	9

== Ski jumping ==
Athlete	Event	Jump 1		Jump 2		Total	
Athlete	Event	Distance	Points	Distance	Points	Points	Rank
Hans-Georg Aschenbach	Normal hill	74.0	103.1	69.5	95.4	198.5	31
Manfred Wolf	Normal hill	77.5	109.2	81.0 (fall)	85.8	195.0	38
Henry Glaß	Normal hill	78.0	109.5	73.5	102.3	211.8	18
Rainer Schmidt	Normal hill	80.5	114.5	75.0	102.7	217.2	15
Heinz Wosipiwo	Large hill	82.0	74.3	87.0	85.3	159.6	39
Henry Glaß	Large hill	91.0	97.9	84.0	85.1	183.0	20
Rainer Schmidt	Large hill	98.5	106.4	101.0	112.9	219.3	3rd place, bronze medalist(s)
Manfred Wolf	Large hill	107.0	120.3	89.5	94.8	215.1	5

== Speed skating ==
Women

Event	Athlete	Race	
Event	Athlete	Time	Rank
500 m	Ruth Budzisch-Schleiermacher	45.78	13
1000 m	Ruth Budzisch-Schleiermacher	1:52.65 (fall)	33
1000 m	Rosemarie Taupadel	1:33.79	12
1500 m	Rosemarie Taupadel	2:22.35	5
3000 m	Rosemarie Taupadel	5:12.85	15
