= Rowing at the 1976 Summer Olympics – Women's single sculls =

Women's single sculls at the Games of the XXI Olympiad
- Date: 19–24 July 1976
- Competitors: 11 from 11 nations

Medalists
1st place, gold medalist(s)		Christine Scheiblich	East Germany
2nd place, silver medalist(s)		Joan Lind	United States
3rd place, bronze medalist(s)		Yelena Antonova	Soviet Union

The women's single sculls competition at the 1976 Summer Olympics took place at Notre Dame Island Olympic Basin, Canada. It was the first time the event was contested for women.

== Competition format ==
The competition consisted of two main rounds (heats and finals) as well as a repechage. The 11 competitors were divided into two heats for the first round, with 5 boats in one heat and 6 in the other. The winner of each heat advanced directly to the "A" final (1st through 6th place). The remaining 9 rowers were placed in the repechage. Two heats were held in the repechage, with 4 boats in one and 5 in the other. The top two boats in each heat of the repechage went to the "A" final as well. The remaining 5 boats (3rd, 4th, and 5th placers in the repechage heats) competed in the "B" final for 7th through 11th place.

All races were over a 1000 metre course.

== Results ==
=== Heats ===
==== Heat 1 ====
Rank	Rower	Nation	Time	Notes
1	Rositsa Spasova	Bulgaria	3:42.67	QA
2	Yelena Antonova	Soviet Union	3:43.15	R
3	Mariann Ambrus	Hungary	3:47.97	R
4	Annick Anthoine	France	3:55.14	R
5	Ewa Ambroziak	Poland	3:58.09	R
6	Colette Pepin	Canada	4:05.37	R

==== Heat 2 ====
Rank	Rower	Nation	Time	Notes
1	Christine Scheiblich	East Germany	3:36.09	QA
2	Joan Lind	United States	3:40.67	R
3	Ingrid Munneke-Dusseldorp	Netherlands	3:49.29	R
4	Christel Agrikola	West Germany	3:50.42	R
5	Tone Pahle	Norway	4:26.19	R

=== Repechage ===
==== Repechage heat 1 ====
Rank	Rower	Nation	Time	Notes
1	Yelena Antonova	Soviet Union	4:02.47	QA
2	Ingrid Munneke-Dusseldorp	Netherlands	4:05.02	QA
3	Christel Agrikola	West Germany	4:08.35	QB
4	Ewa Ambroziak	Poland	4:16.74	QB
5	Colette Pepin	Canada	4:26.23	QB

==== Repechage heat 2 ====
Rank	Rower	Nation	Time	Notes
1	Joan Lind	United States	4:03.87	QA
2	Mariann Ambrus	Hungary	4:10.20	QA
3	Annick Anthoine	France	4:14.00	QB
4	Tone Pahle	Norway	4:26.19	QB

=== Finals ===
==== Final B ====
Rank	Rower	Nation	Time
7	Annick Anthoine	France	4:19.14
8	Christel Agrikola	West Germany	4:23.49
9	Ewa Ambroziak	Poland	4:26.60
10	Tone Pahle	Norway	4:30.53
11	Colette Pepin	Canada	4:34.76

==== Final A ====
Rank	Rower	Nation	Time
1st place, gold medalist(s)	Christine Scheiblich	East Germany	4:05.56
2nd place, silver medalist(s)	Joan Lind	United States	4:06.21
3rd place, bronze medalist(s)	Yelena Antonova	Soviet Union	4:10.24
4	Rositsa Spasova	Bulgaria	4:10.86
5	Ingrid Munneke-Dusseldorp	Netherlands	4:18.71
6	Mariann Ambrus	Hungary	4:22.59

== Final classification ==
Rank	Rowers	Country
1st place, gold medalist(s)	Christine Scheiblich	East Germany
2nd place, silver medalist(s)	Joan Lind	United States
3rd place, bronze medalist(s)	Yelena Antonova	Soviet Union
4	Rositsa Spasova	Bulgaria
5	Ingrid Munneke-Dusseldorp	Netherlands
6	Mariann Ambrus	Hungary
7	Annick Anthoine	France
8	Christel Agrikola	West Germany
9	Ewa Ambroziak	Poland
10	Tone Pahle	Norway
11	Colette Pepin	Canada
