= FIL European Luge Championships 1977 =

The FIL European Luge Championships 1977 took place in Königssee, West Germany for a record fourth time after hosting the event previously in 1967, 1972, and 1973.

== Men's singles ==
| Medal | Athlete | Time |
|---|---|---|
| Gold | Anton Winkler (FRG) | |
| Silver | Hans Rinn (GDR) | |
| Bronze | Karl Brunner (ITA) | |

== Women's singles ==
| Medal | Athlete | Time |
|---|---|---|
| Gold | Elisabeth Demleitner (FRG) | |
| Silver | Margit Schumann (GDR) | |
| Bronze | Margit Graf (AUT) | |

== Men's doubles ==
| Medal | Athlete | Time |
|---|---|---|
| Gold | West Germany (Hans Brandner, Balthasar Schwarm) | |
| Silver | East Germany (Hans Rinn, Norbert Hahn) | |
| Bronze | West Germany (Stefan Hölzlwimmer, Rudolf Grosswang) | |

== Medal table ==
| Rank | Nation | Gold | Silver | Bronze | Total |
|---|---|---|---|---|---|
| 1 | West Germany (FRG) | 3 | 0 | 1 | 4 |
| 2 | East Germany (GDR) | 0 | 3 | 0 | 3 |
| 3 | Austria (AUT) | 0 | 0 | 1 | 1 |
| 3 | Italy (ITA) | 0 | 0 | 1 | 1 |
| Totals (4 entries) | | 3 | 3 | 3 | 9 |
