= Venues of the 1976 Winter Olympics =

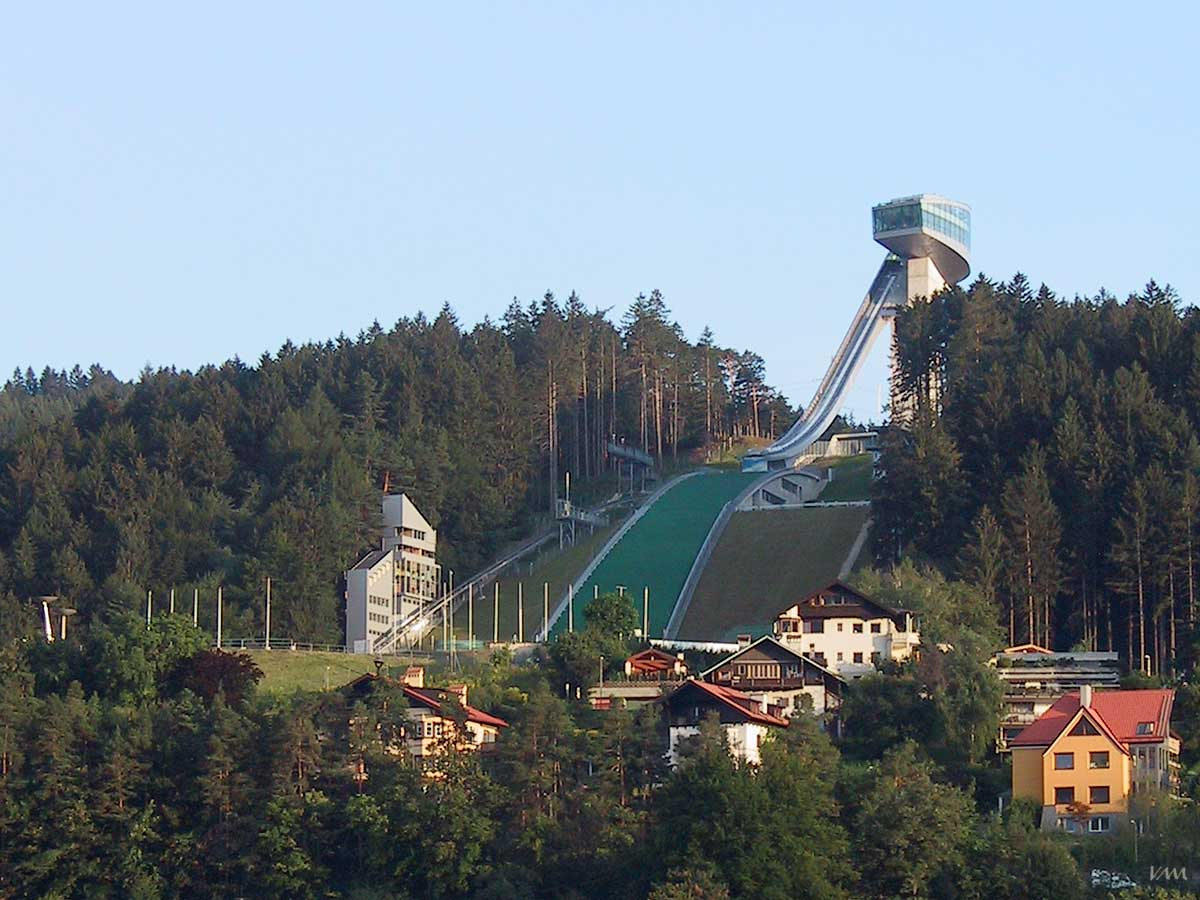
Bergiselschanze in 2004. The venue hosted the large hill ski jumping event at the 1976 Winter Olympics.

For the 1976 Winter Olympics in Innsbruck, Austria, a total of eight sports venues were used. The games were originally awarded to Denver, Colorado in the United States in 1970, but they withdrew in the wake of Colorado residents voting against it for environmental and cost reasons in November 1972. This led to the International Olympic Committee opening up the bids for the games again, eventually awarding them to Innsbruck in February 1973. The Austrian city, having hosted the Winter Olympics in 1964, was in the process of having the venues used for those Games before Denver's with clear cutting of the alpine skiing venues, lessening of the amount of cross-country skiing routes, upgrading the ski jumps, adding lighting in the indoor sports arena to accommodate color television, and the construction of a combination bobsleigh and luge track. After the 1976 Games, the venues have remained in use, hosting events in Nordic skiing and the sliding sports. They hosted some of the events for the Winter Universiade in 1968 and 2005 and seven of the eight venues served as host for the first Winter Youth Olympic Games in 2012.

== Venues ==
Venue	Sports	Capacity	Ref.
Axamer Lizum	Alpine skiing (all but men's downhill)	Not listed.	
Bergiselschanze	Ski jumping (large hill), opening ceremonies	26,000	
Eisschnellaufbahn	Speed skating	7,000	
Kombinierte Kunsteisbahn für Bob-Rodel Igls	Bobsleigh, Luge	Not listed.	
Messehalle	Ice hockey	5,544	
Olympiahalle	Figure skating, Ice hockey, closing ceremonies	10,836	
Patscherkofel	Alpine skiing (men's downhill)	Not listed	
Seefeld	Biathlon, Cross-country skiing, Nordic combined, Ski jumping (normal hill)	Not listed.	

== Before the Olympics ==
Innsbruck hosted the Winter Olympics in 1964. Bergiselschanze, one of the venues used for those games, has been part of ski jumping's Four Hills Tournament since the 1952–3 season.

At the International Olympic Committee (IOC) session at Amsterdam in May 1970, Denver, Colorado was selected over Sion, Tampere, and Whistler, British Columbia to host the 1976 Winter Games. Local pressure from residents in Colorado forced a referendum vote two years later in which state residents, led by future governor Richard Lamm on environmental and cost concerns. A vote of 3 to 2 against on 7 November 1972 confirmed this, resulting in the United States Olympic Committee wanting to move the 1976 Winter Games to Salt Lake City, Utah. Denver withdrew their bid in November 1972, resulting in the IOC reopening up the bid for the 1976 Games. Besides Innsbruck, other cities who bid were Salt Lake City, Garmisch-Partenkirchen, Chamonix, and Lake Placid, New York. Innsbruck was awarded the 1976 Games by the IOC on 4 February 1973.

Before Innsbruck was awarded the 1976 Winter Games, the venues used were in the process of being expanded. Patscherkofel's downhill run was widened in 1971. Axamer Lixum's course proposed originally for the 1964 Winter Games was used for both men's and women's event had to be clear cut in order to remove the trees located there along with its slope being reduced from 66 to 71% to 28-31%. A total of 100,000 m^{3} (130,000 cu yd) was moved along with the canalization of a deep ditch 68 m (223 ft) long. Seefeld used lesser loops for the cross-country courses compared to the 1964 Games. New lighting was installed in Olympiahalle to accommodate color television along with a new loudspeaker system. A plastic pipe under the ice had to be replaced when American figure skater Terry Kubicka broke through the ice, piercing the pipe, and creating a coolant leak. Two new compressors of ammonia refrigeration were added to Eisschnellaufbahn to maintain the ice at −10 °C (14 °F). The biggest change was at the bobsleigh and luge track where a single track was used for combined events, the first of its kind in the world. Construction of the track began in 1973 under the auspices of the International Bobsleigh and Tobogganing Federation and International Luge Federation and was completed the following year. During the 1975 Olympic Test Competition on the track, East Germany set up cameras and timers all along the run to determine the fastest lines through each of the straights and curves.

== During the Olympics ==
In the alpine skiing men's downhill, Austria' Franz Klammer came from behind to beat Switzerland's Bernhard Russi in where television coverage was given for the entire run.

The work that East Germany did at analyzing the Igls track in 1975 paid off with gold medals in all three luge and both bobsleigh events.

During the cross-country skiing men's 4 x 10 km relay event, East Germany was in second place after the first leg of the event. Axel Lesser, the second leg of the East German team, ran into a spectator, injured his knee, and had to abandon the race.

== After the Olympics ==
Bergiselschanze remains a part of the Four Hills Tournament. Seefeld would play host to the FIS Nordic World Ski Championships in 1985 and 2019.

Igls has served as host of the IBSF World Championships (previous FIBT) in 1991 (men's skeleton), 1993 (bobsleigh), 2000 (skeleton), and 2016. The track hosted the FIL European Luge Championships in 1990 and hosted the FIL World Luge Championships five times in 1977, 1987, 1997, 2007, and 2017.

Seefeld and Innsbruck combined to host the Winter Universiade in 1968 and 2005. In 2012, Innsbruck hosted the first Winter Youth Olympic Games. All venues used for the 1976 Winter Olympics except for Axamer Lizum were in use as venues for the 2012 Winter Youth Games.
