= Rainer Groß =

Rainer Groß or Gross may refer to:

- Rainer Groß (skier)
- Rainer Gross (politician)
