= Colette Pepin =

Canadian rower

Personal information
- Born: 8 July 1952 (age 73) Saint-Laurent, Quebec, Canada

Sport
- Sport: Rowing

Colette Pepin (born 8 July 1952) is a Canadian rower. She competed in the women's single sculls event at the 1976 Summer Olympics.
