= Annick Anthoine =

French rower

Personal information
- Nationality: French
- Born: 21 November 1945 (age 79)

Sport
- Sport: Rowing

Annick Anthoine (born 21 November 1945) is a French rower. She competed in the women's single sculls event at the 1976 Summer Olympics.
