= Luge at the 1976 Winter Olympics =

Luge at the XII Olympic Winter Games
- Venue: Olympic Sliding Centre Innsbruck
- Dates: 4–7 February 1976
- Competitors: 94 from 16 nations

Luge at the 1976 Winter Olympics consisted of three events at Olympic Sliding Centre Innsbruck. The competition took place between 4 and 7 February 1976.

== Medal summary ==
=== Medal table ===
Rank	Nation	Gold	Silver	Bronze	Total
1	East Germany	3	1	1	5
2	West Germany	0	2	1	3
3	Austria	0	0	1	1
Totals (3 entries)		3	3	3	9

Germany dominated the medal table with eight medals (with an exception of an Austrian bronze medal), including an East German sweep of the gold medals.

=== Events ===
Event	Gold		Silver		Bronze	
Men's singles	Dettlef Günther; East Germany	3:27.688	Josef Fendt; West Germany	3:28.196	Hans Rinn; East Germany	3:28.574
Women's singles	Margit Schumann; East Germany	2:50.621	Ute Rührold; East Germany	2:50.846	Elisabeth Demleitner; West Germany	2:51.056
Doubles	East Germany; Hans Rinn; Norbert Hahn	1:25.604	West Germany; Hans Brandner; Balthasar Schwarm	1:25.889	Austria; Rudolf Schmid; Franz Schachner	1:25.919

== Participating NOCs ==
Sixteen nations participated in Luge at the Innsbruck Games. Chinese Taipei made their Olympic luge debut.

- Austria (7)
- Canada (8)
- France (1)
- West Germany (8)
- Great Britain (4)
- East Germany (9)
- Italy (8)
- Japan (5)
- Liechtenstein (3)
- Norway (7)
- Poland (9)
- Republic of China (2)
- Sweden (5)
- Czechoslovakia (4)
- Soviet Union (6)
- United States (9)
