= Miroslava Jaškovská =

Medal record

Women's cross-country skiing

Representing Czechoslovakia

World Championships
Bronze medal – third place	1974 Falun	4 × 5 km relay

Miroslava Jaškovská (Czech pronunciation: [ˈmɪroslava ˈjaʃkofskaː]), also known as Miroslava Pospíšilová-Jaškovská (born 5 March 1955 in Čeladná), is a Czech former cross-country skier who competed for Czechoslovakia during the 1970s. She won a bronze medal in the 4 × 5 km relay at the 1974 FIS Nordic World Ski Championships in Falun.

Her best olympic placing was 23rd in the 5 km event at the 1976 Winter Olympics in Innsbruck.

== Cross-country skiing results ==
=== Olympic Games ===
Year	Age	5 km	10 km	4 × 5 km relay
1976	20	23	—	—

=== World Championships ===
- 1 medal – (1 bronze)

Year	Age	5 km	10 km	4 × 5 km relay
1974	18	—	—	Bronze
