= Hans-Jörg Neumann =

German luger

Medal record

Luge

World Championships
Silver medal – second place	1974 Königssee	Men's doubles
Silver medal – second place	1975 Hammarstrand	Men's doubles

European Championships
Silver medal – second place	1975 Olang	Men's doubles

Hans-Jörg Neumann was an East German luger who competed in the mid-1970s. He won two silver medals in the men's doubles event at the FIL World Luge Championships (1974, 1975).

Neumann also won a silver medal in the men's doubles event at the 1975 FIL European Luge Championships in Olang, Italy.
