= Stefan Hölzlwimmer =

German luger (born 1951)

Medal record

Men's Luge

Representing West Germany

World Cup Championships
Bronze medal – third place	1977-78	Men's doubles

European Championships
Bronze medal – third place	1977 Königssee	Men's doubles

Stefan Hölzlwimmer (born 9 March 1951) is a West German former luger who competed in the late 1970s. He won the bronze medal in the men's doubles event at the 1977 FIL European Luge Championships in Königssee, West Germany.

Hölzlwimmer also finished fourth in the men's doubles event at the 1976 Winter Olympics in Innsbruck.

His best overall finish in the Luge World Cup was third in men's doubles in the 1977-8 inaugural season.
