= Jannes Munneke =

Dutch rower

Personal information
- Born: Jannes Albert Munneke; 28 October 1949 (age 76) Musselkanaal, Groningen, the Netherlands
- Height: 180 cm (5 ft 11 in)
- Weight: 80 kg (176 lb)
- Spouse: Ingrid Munneke-Dusseldorp

Sport
- Sport: Rowing
- Club: Aegir, Groningen

Jannes Albert Munneke (born 6 February 1949) is a retired Dutch rower. He competed at the 1972 Summer Olympics in the eight event and finished in ninth place. His wife Ingrid Munneke-Dusseldorp is also an Olympic rower.
