= Stefan Hula Sr. =

Polish Nordic combined skier (1947–2025)

Stefan Hula
Personal information
- Full name: Stefan Marian Hula
- Born: 12 September 1947 Szczyrk, Poland
- Died: 29 March 2025 (aged 77)
- Height: 170 cm (5 ft 7 in)

Sport
- Country: Poland
- Sport: Nordic combined
Medal record
Men's Nordic combined
Representing Poland
World Championships
Bronze medal – third place	1974 Falun	Individual

Stefan Marian Hula (12 September 1947 – 29 March 2025) was a Polish Nordic combined skier who competed in the early 1970s. He won a bronze medal in the individual event at the 1974 FIS Nordic World Ski Championships in Falun. Hula also competed in the 1972 Winter Olympics and 1976 Winter Olympics.

Hula was born on 12 September 1947 in Szczyrk, Poland, and died on 29 March 2025, at the age of 77. His son, also named Stefan, is an Olympic ski jumper.
