= Čeladná =

- Municipality
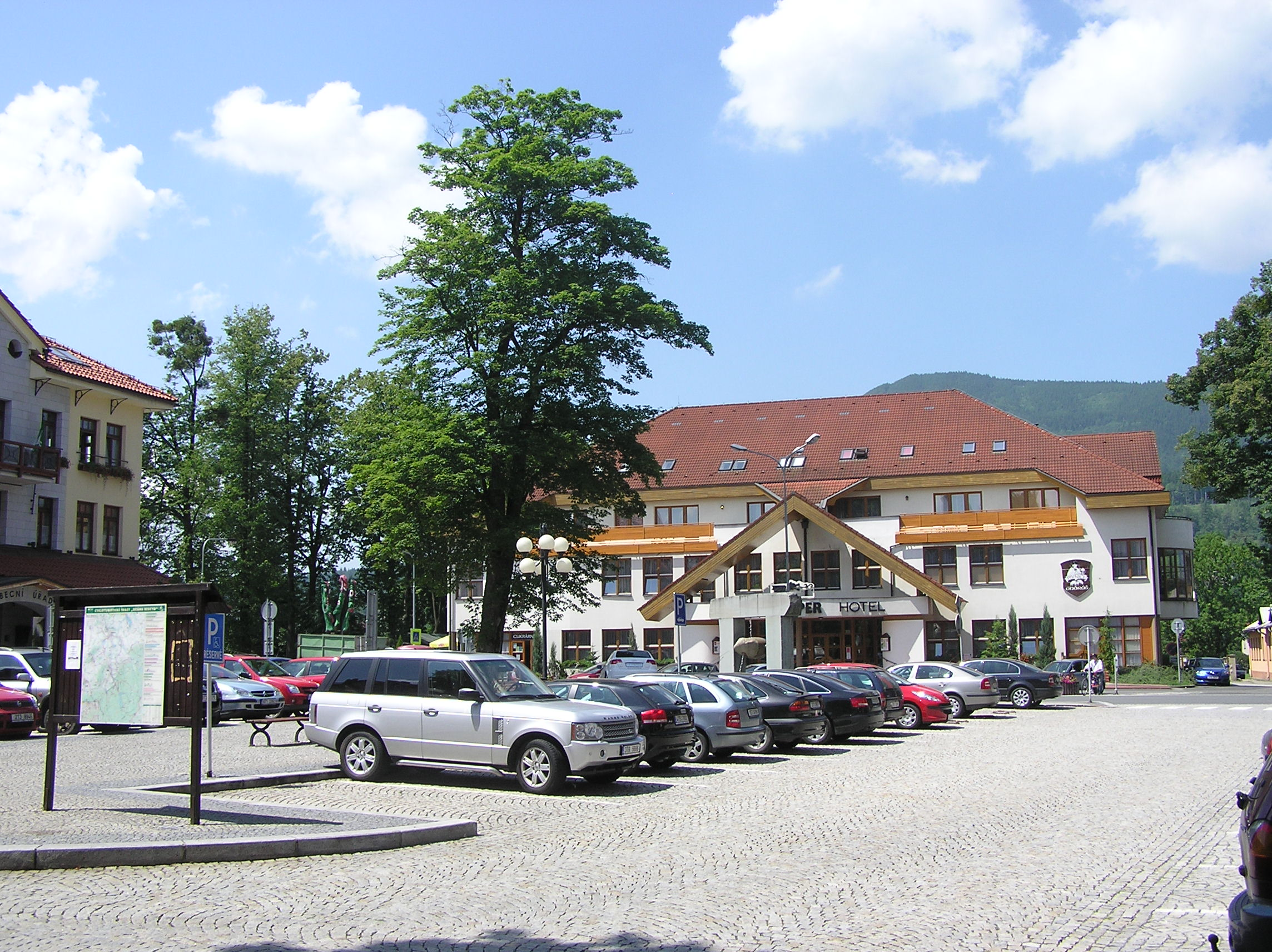
- Centre of Čeladná

- Flag Coat of arms

- Location in the Czech Republic
- Coordinates: 49°32′51″N 18°20′14″E
- Country: Czech Republic
- Region: Moravian-Silesian
- District: Frýdek-Místek
- First mentioned: 1581

Area
  - Total: 59.06 km^{2} (22.80 sq mi)
- Elevation: 430 m (1,410 ft)

Population (2026-01-01)
  - Total: 2,978
  - Density: 50.42/km^{2} (130.6/sq mi)
- Time zone: UTC+1 (CET)
  - Summer (DST): UTC+2 (CEST)
- Postal code: 739 12
- Website: www.celadna.cz

Čeladná (Czech pronunciation: [ˈtʃɛladnaː]) is a municipality and village in Frýdek-Místek District in the Moravian-Silesian Region of the Czech Republic. It has about 3,000 inhabitants. The municipality is located on the Čeladenka Stream in the Moravian-Silesian Beskids mountain range.

In the 21st century, Čeladná has become a holiday resort. It is known for the largest golf course in the Czech Republic.

== Geography ==
Čeladná is located about 14 kilometres (9 mi) south of Frýdek-Místek and 27 km (17 mi) south of Ostrava. It lies in the Moravian-Silesian Beskids mountain range. The highest point is the mountain Smrk at 1,276 m (4,186 ft) above sea level. The municipality is situated in the valley of the Čeladenka Stream.

== History ==
The first written mention of Čeladná is from 1581.

The spa and rehabilitation centre were founded here in 1902. From the 1950s to 2000, the activity of the spa was suspended and there was a hospital and a popular maternity hospital on the premises, therefore Čeladná is the birthplace of many personalities.

== Demographics ==
Historical population

Year	Pop.	±%
1869	2,129	—
1880	2,344	+10.1%
1890	2,490	+6.2%
1900	2,592	+4.1%
1910	2,691	+3.8%

Year	Pop.	±%
1921	2,506	−6.9%
1930	2,655	+5.9%
1950	2,311	−13.0%
1961	2,495	+8.0%
1970	2,410	−3.4%

Year	Pop.	±%
1980	2,179	−9.6%
1991	2,016	−7.5%
2001	2,035	+0.9%
2011	2,512	+23.4%
2021	2,971	+18.3%

Source: Censuses

== Economy ==
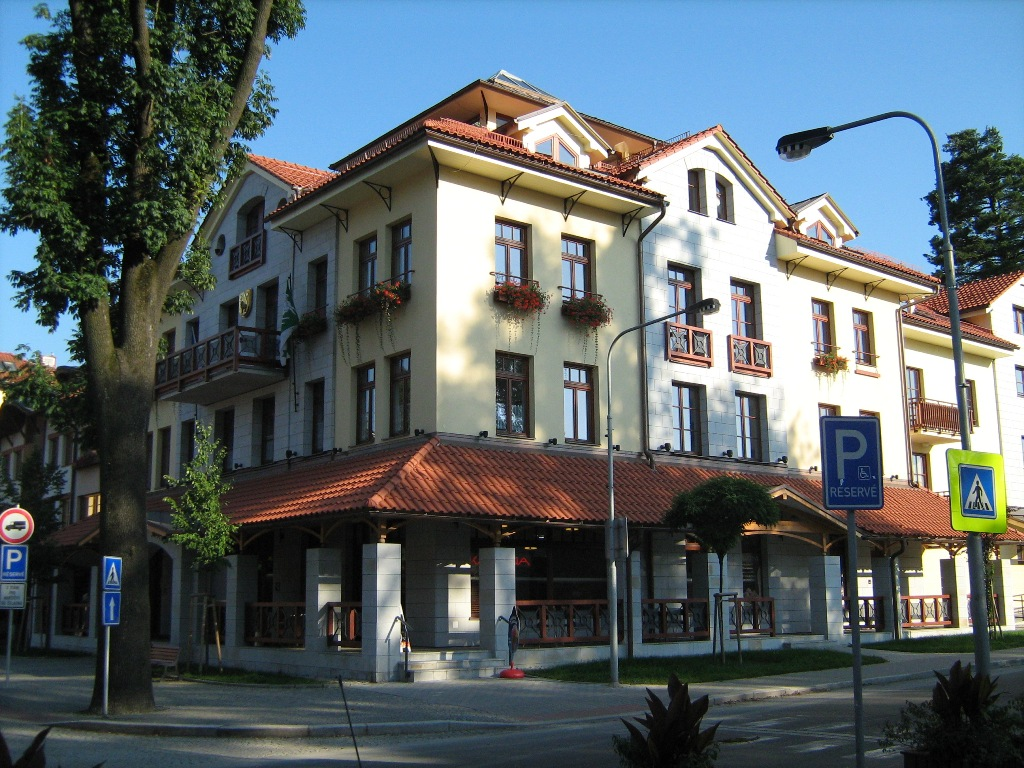
Municipal office

Čeladná is known for its spa and rehabilitation centre. It is the main employer in the municipality.

In the 21st century, Čeladná has become a popular holiday resort with new hotels and infrastructure.

== Transport ==
Čeladná is located on the railway line Valašské Meziříčí–Frýdlant nad Ostravicí.

== Sport ==
Čeladná is renowned for the largest golf course in the Czech Republic. The sports and recreation complex Prosper Golf Resort Čeladná has two 18-hole championship golf courses. The entire golf resort has an area of 140 hectares (350 acres), of which the course itself is 100 hectares (250 acres). In winter, when there is sufficient snow, the area is used for cross-country skiing.

== Sights ==
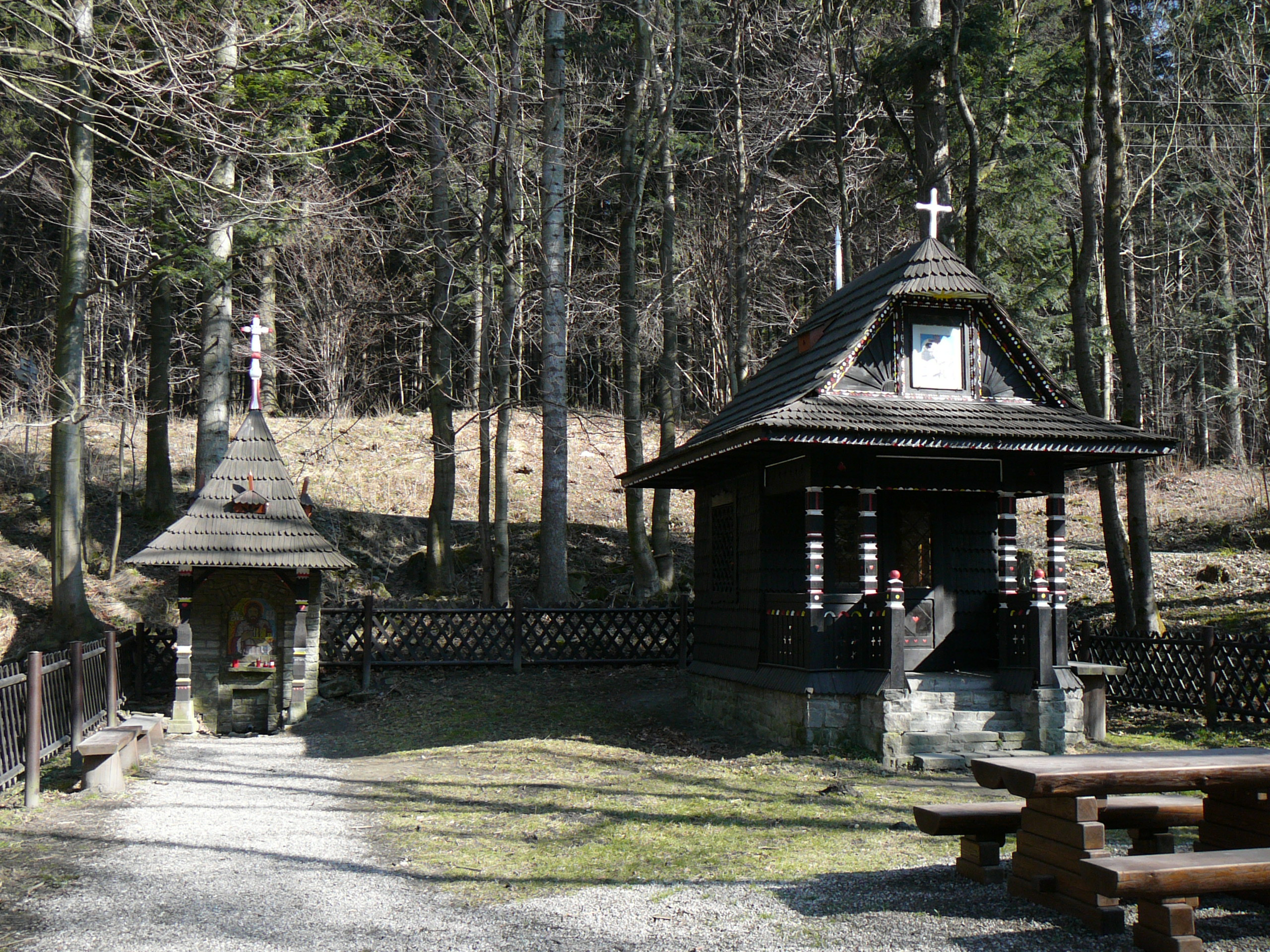
Chapel of Saints Cyril and Methodius

The Chapel of Saints Cyril and Methodius was built in 1936 and is inspired by the work of Dušan Jurkovič.

== Notable people ==
- Miroslava Jaškovská (born 1955), cross-country skier
- Ivo Valenta (born 1956), businessman and politician
- Ladislav Dluhoš (born 1965), ski jumper
- Iveta Bartošová (1966–2014), singer
- Ondřej Kratěna (born 1977), ice hockey player
- Pavel Kubina (born 1977), ice hockey player
- Jakub Janda (born 1978), ski jumper and politician
- Adam Lacko (born 1984), racing driver
- Jan Mazoch (born 1985), ski jumper
