= Peter Reichnwallner =

German luger

Medal record

Luge

European Championships
Bronze medal – third place	1972 Königssee	Men's doubles

Peter Reichnwallner was a West German luger who competed in the early 1970s. He won the bronze medal in the men's doubles event at the 1972 FIL European Luge Championships in Königssee, West Germany.
