= Christel Agrikola =

German rower

Personal information
- Nationality: German
- Born: 29 March 1953 (age 72) Germersheim, Germany

Sport
- Sport: Rowing

Christel Agrikola (born 29 March 1953) is a German rower. She competed in the women's single sculls event at the 1976 Summer Olympics.
