= Wolfram Fiedler =

East German luger (1951–1988)

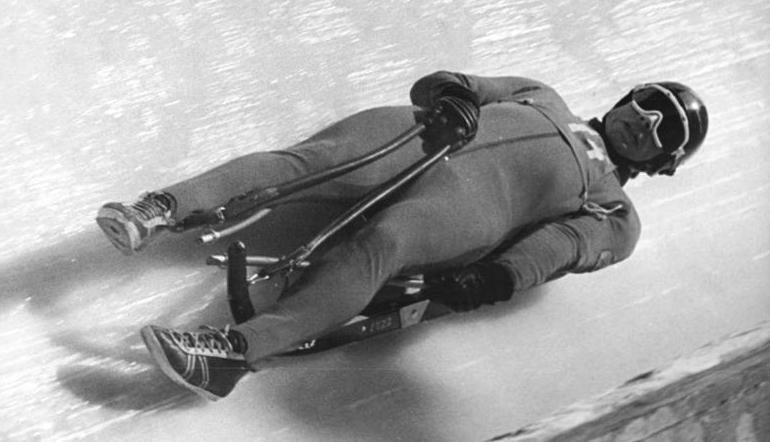
- Fieldler at the 1972 European Luge championships in Königssee, West Germany.

Personal information
- Born: 29 September 1951 Ilmenau, East Germany
- Died: 11 April 1988 (aged 36) East Berlin, East Germany
Medal record
Men's luge
Representing East Germany
Olympic Games
Bronze medal – third place	1972 Sapporo	Men's singles
Bronze medal – third place	1972 Sapporo	Men's doubles
World Championships
Gold medal – first place	1975 Hammarstrand	Men's singles
Silver medal – second place	1973 Oberhof	Men's singles
European Championships
Gold medal – first place	1972 Königssee	Men's singles
Gold medal – first place	1976 Hammarstrand	Men's singles
Silver medal – second place	1975 Olang	Men's singles

Wolfram Fiedler (29 September 1951 – 11 April 1988) was an East German luger who competed from the mid-1960s to the mid-1970s. He won two bronze medals at the 1972 Winter Olympics in Sapporo, earning them in the men's singles and men's doubles event, respectively.

Fiedler also won two medals in the men's singles event at the FIL World Luge Championships with a gold in 1975 and a silver in 1973.

He also won three medals in the men's singles event at the FIL European Luge Championships with two golds (1972, 1976) and one silver (1975).

Fiedler died of cancer in 1988. The summer luge track in his hometown of Ilmenau was named in his honor the following year.
