= Trina Hosmer =

American cross-country skier (born 1945)

Personal information
- Full name: Trina Arlene Barton Hosmer
- Born: March 28, 1945 (age 80); Watertown, New York, United States

Sport
- Sport: Cross-country skiing

Trina Hosmer (born March 28, 1945) is an American cross-country skier. She competed in the women's 10 kilometre at the 1972 Winter Olympics. Hosmer is a graduate of the University of Vermont, where she was a member of the school's cross-country ski team.

== Personal life ==
Hosmer was introduced to cross-country skiing at the University of Vermont by her boyfriend, and future husband, Dave Hosmer. Hosmer graduated from SUNY Potsdam in 1966 and earned her master's degree at Vermont in 1968. She and her husband later became faculty members at the University of Massachusetts, where she was a statistical software consultant. Hosmer was also a nationally caliber 1,500 meter runner, in addition to her cross-country skiing. She later became an active masters racer and Nordic ski instructor. Into her 70s, she had won over 30 gold medals at the Masters World Championships. Hosmer won three gold medals in the 2019 Masters World Cup competition in Beitostølen, Norway.
