= Vasily Rochev =

Vasily Rochev may refer to:

- Vasily Rochev (skier, born 1951), Soviet/Russian cross-country skier
- Vasily Rochev (skier, born 1980), Russian cross-country skier; son of Vasily Rochev above
