= Petra Hinze =

East German cross-country skier (born 1955)

Personal information
- Born: 20 April 1955 (age 71) Aue, East Germany

Sport
- Sport: Skiing
- Club: SC Traktor Oberwiesenthal
Medal record
Women's cross-country skiing
Representing East Germany
World Championships
Silver medal – second place	1974 Falun	4 × 5 km relay

Petra Hinze (born 20 April 1955 in Aue) is a former East German cross-country skier who competed during the 1970s starting for SC Traktor Oberwiesenthal. She won a silver medal in the 4 × 5 km relay at the 1974 FIS Nordic World Ski Championships in Falun. She retired from skiing in 1975.

== Cross-country skiing results ==
=== World Championships ===
- 1 medal – (1 silver)

Year	Age	5 km	10 km	4 × 5 km relay
1974	18	—	—	Silver
