= FIL World Luge Championships 1973 =

The FIL World Luge Championships 1973 took place in Oberhof, East Germany.

== Men's singles ==
Medal	Athlete	Time
Gold	Hans Rinn (GDR)	
Silver	Wolfram Fiedler (GDR)	
Bronze	Harald Ehrig (GDR)	

== Women's singles ==
Medal	Athlete	Time
Gold	Margit Schumann (GDR)	
Silver	Ute Rührold (GDR)	
Bronze	Eva-Maria Wernicke (GDR)	

== Men's doubles ==
Medal	Athlete	Time
Gold	East Germany (Horst Hömlein, Reinhard Bredlow)	
Silver	East Germany (Hans Rinn, Norbert Hahn)	
Bronze	Italy (Paul Hildgartner, Walter Plaikner)	

== Medal table ==
Rank	Nation	Gold	Silver	Bronze	Total
1	East Germany (GDR)	3	3	2	8
2	Italy (ITA)	0	0	1	1
Totals (2 entries)		3	3	3	9
