= Ivo Valenta =

Czech businessman and politician

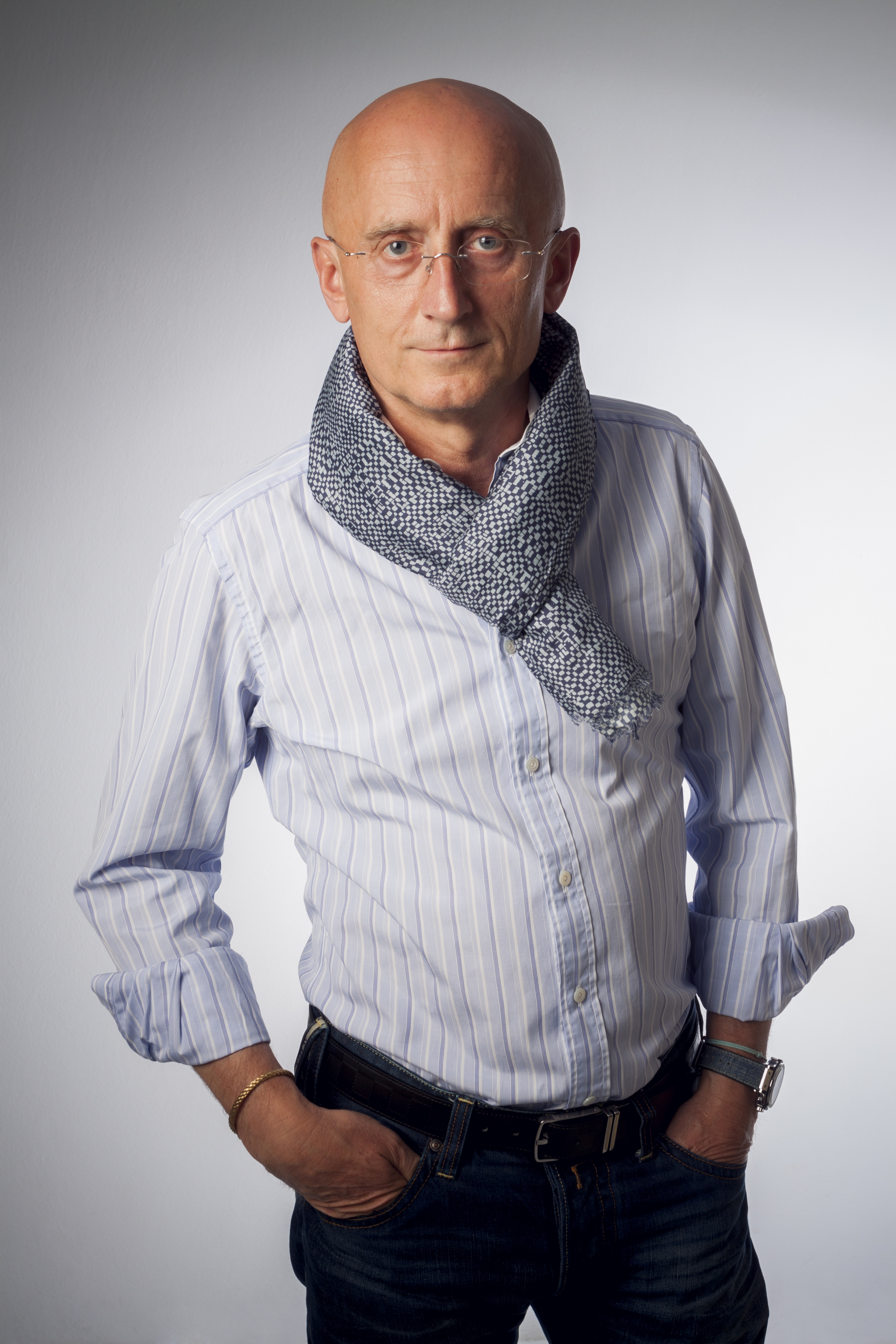

Senator from Uherské Hradiště
- In office 18 October 2014 – 18 October 2020
- Preceded by: Hana Doupovcová
- Succeeded by: Josef Bazala

Personal details
- Born: 3 August 1956 (age 68); Čeladná, Czechoslovakia (now Czech Republic)
- Political party: Independent
- Spouse: Alena Valentová

Ivo Valenta (born 3 August 1956) is a Czech businessman and politician. Valenta owns betting firm SYNOT and served as Senator from Uherské Hradiště.

Between 2014 and 2020, he was a senator for District 81 - Uherské Hradiště, from 2016 to October 2020 he was a councillor of the Zlín Region and from 2018 to 2019 a councillor of the city of Zlín (non-party member of the Party of Privateers of the Czech Republic).
