= FIL European Luge Championships 1975 =

The FIL European Luge Championships 1975 took place in Olang, Italy.

== Men's singles ==
Medal	Athlete	Time
Gold	Detlef Günther (GDR)	
Silver	Wolfram Fiedler (GDR)	
Bronze	Hans Rinn (GDR)	

== Women's singles ==
Medal	Athlete	Time
Gold	Margit Schumann (GDR)	
Silver	Eva-Maria Wernicke (GDR)	
Bronze	Halina Kanasz (POL)	

== Men's doubles ==
Medal	Athlete	Time
Gold	East Germany (Hans Rinn, Norbert Hahn)	
Silver	East Germany (Horst Müller, Hans-Jörg Neumann)	
Bronze	East Germany (Bernd Hahn, Ulrich Hahn)	

== Medal table ==
Rank	Nation	Gold	Silver	Bronze	Total
1	East Germany (GDR)	3	3	2	8
2	Poland (POL)	0	0	1	1
Totals (2 entries)		3	3	3	9
