= FIL European Luge Championships 1973 =

The FIL European Luge Championships 1973 took place in Königssee, West Germany for the second consecutive year and third time overall (1967, 1972).

== Men's singles ==
Medal	Athlete	Time
Gold	Hans Rinn (GDR)	
Silver	Josef Fendt (FRG)	
Bronze	Manfred Schmid (AUT)	

== Women's singles ==
Medal	Athlete	Time
Gold	Margit Schumann (GDR)	
Silver	Ute Rührold (GDR)	
Bronze	Eva-Maria Wernicke (GDR)	

== Men's doubles ==
Medal	Athlete	Time
Gold	East Germany (Hans Rinn, Norbert Hahn)	
Silver	East Germany (Bernd Hahn, Ulrich Hahn)	
Bronze	West Germany (Hans Brandner, Balthasar Schwarm)	

== Medal table ==
Rank	Nation	Gold	Silver	Bronze	Total
1	East Germany (GDR)	3	2	1	6
2	West Germany (FRG)	0	1	1	2
3	Austria (AUT)	0	0	1	1
Totals (3 entries)		3	3	3	9
