= FIL World Luge Championships 1975 =

The FIL World Luge Championships 1975 took place in Hammarstrand, Sweden for a second time after previously hosting the championships in 1967.

== Men's singles ==
Medal	Athlete	Time
Gold	Wolfram Fiedler (GDR)	
Silver	Manfred Schmid (AUT)	
Bronze	Harald Ehrig (GDR)	

== Women's singles ==
Medal	Athlete	Time
Gold	Margit Schumann (GDR)	
Silver	Ute Rührold (GDR)	
Bronze	Dana Spálenská (TCH)	

== Men's doubles ==
Medal	Athlete	Time
Gold	East Germany (Hans Rinn, Norbert Hahn)	
Silver	East Germany (Horst Müller, Hans-Jörg Neumann)	
Bronze	Austria (Rudolf Schmid, Franz Schachner)	

== Medal table ==
Rank	Nation	Gold	Silver	Bronze	Total
1	East Germany (GDR)	3	2	1	6
2	Austria (AUT)	0	1	1	2
3	Czechoslovakia (TCH)	0	0	1	1
Totals (3 entries)		3	3	3	9
