= FIL European Luge Championships 1970 =

The FIL European Luge Championships 1970 took place in Hammarstrand, Sweden. This event was dominated by the rise of the East German team, who won six of the nine available medals at this championship. It was the first time the championships were held after being cancelled in 1968 and 1969 which were also the last cancellation of the European championships.

== Men's singles ==
Medal	Athlete	Time
Gold	Harald Ehrig (GDR)	
Silver	Wolfgang Scheidel (GDR)	
Bronze	Horst Hörnlein (GDR)	

== Women's singles ==
Medal	Athlete	Time
Gold	Anna-Maria Müller (GDR)	
Silver	Angela Knösel (GDR)	
Bronze	Christina Schmuck (FRG)	

== Men's doubles ==
Medal	Athlete	Time
Gold	East Germany (Horst Hörnlein, Reinhard Bredlow)	
Silver	Austria (Rudolf Schmid, Franz Schachner)	
Bronze	Austria (Manfred Schmid, Ewald Walch)	

== Medal table ==
Rank	Nation	Gold	Silver	Bronze	Total
1	East Germany (GDR)	3	2	1	6
2	Austria (AUT)	0	1	1	2
3	West Germany (FRG)	0	0	1	1
Totals (3 entries)		3	3	3	9
