= Rudolf Schmid (luger) =

Austrian luger (1951–2014)

Medal record

Luge

Olympic Games
Bronze medal – third place	1976 Innsbruck	Men's doubles

World Championships
Bronze medal – third place	1974 Königssee	Men's doubles
Bronze medal – third place	1975 Hammarstrand	Men's doubles

European Championships
Silver medal – second place	1970 Hammarstrand	Men's doubles
Bronze medal – third place	1974 Imst	Men's singles

Rudolf Schmid (21 March 1951 in Liezen – 21 October 2014) was an Austrian luger who competed during the mid-1970s. Teamed with Franz Schachner, together they won the bronze medal in the men's doubles event at the 1976 Winter Olympics of Innsbruck.

Schmid also won two bronze medals in the men's doubles event at the FIL World Luge Championships (1974, 1975). He also won two medals at the FIL European Luge Championships: a silver in men's doubles (1970) and a bronze in men's singles (1974).

On 21 October 2014 Schmid was killed in a cycling accident in Oberwart, Austria at the age of 64. His brother Manfred won the men's singles luge gold at the 1968 Winter Olympics in Grenoble.
