= Thomas Magnuson =

Swedish cross-country skier

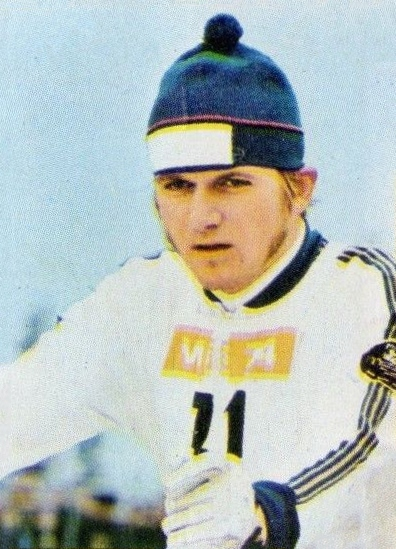
- Thomas Magnuson

Personal information
- Born: 2 July 1950 (age 76) Motala, Sweden
- Height: 186 cm (6 ft 1 in)
- Weight: 77 kg (170 lb)

Sport
- Sport: Cross-country skiing
- Club: Delsbo IF, Delsbo, Hudiksvall
Medal record
Men's cross-country skiing
Representing Sweden
World Championships
Gold medal – first place	1974 Falun	30 km
Gold medal – first place	1978 Lahti	4 × 10 km relay
Bronze medal – third place	1974 Falun	50 km

Bernt Thomas Magnuson (also Magnusson, born 2 July 1950) is a retired Swedish cross-country skier. He competed at the 1972 Winter Olympics in the 30 km and the 4 × 10 km relay and placed 28th and fourth, respectively. He won three medals at the FIS Nordic World Ski Championships, including golds in the 30 km (1974) and the 4 × 10 km relay (1978) and a bronze in the 50 km (1974). Magnusson also won the 50 km event at the 1977 Holmenkollen ski festival.

== Cross-country skiing results ==
All results are sourced from the International Ski Federation (FIS).

=== Olympic Games ===
Year	Age	15 km	30 km	50 km	4 × 10 km relay
1972	21	—	28	—	4

=== World Championships ===
- 3 medals – (2 gold, 1 bronze)

Year	Age	15 km	30 km	50 km	4 × 10 km relay
1974	23	—	Gold	Bronze	—
1978	27	—	18	—	Gold
