= FIS Nordic World Ski Championships 1974 =

International Nordic skiing competition

- Host city: Falun
- Country: Sweden
- Events: 10
- Opening: 16 February 1974
- Closing: 24 February 1974
- Main venue: Lugnet

The FIS Nordic World Ski Championships 1974 took place 16–24 February 1974 in Falun, Sweden. This was the second time this city hosted the event having done so in 1954. The women's 3 × 5 km relay changed to a 4 × 5 km relay at these championships. Magne Myrmo's gold medal in the 15 km race, was the last international cross-country championship medal won using wooden skis. Two years later, at the 1976 Winter Olympics, all competitors used skis made of fiberglass.

== Men's cross-country ==
=== 15 km ===
19 February 1974

Medal	Athlete	Time
Gold	Magne Myrmo (NOR)	41:39.09
Silver	Gerhard Grimmer (GDR)	41:40.01
Bronze	Vasily Rochev (URS)	41:40.65

=== 30 km ===
17 February 1974

Medal	Athlete	Time
Gold	Thomas Magnusson (SWE)	1:33:41.40
Silver	Juha Mieto (FIN)	1:34:34.81
Bronze	Jan Staszel (POL)	1:34:56.49

=== 50 km ===
24 February 1974

Medal	Athlete	Time
Gold	Gerhard Grimmer (GDR)	2:19:45.26
Silver	Stanislav Henych (TCH)	2:21:35.50
Bronze	Thomas Magnusson (SWE)	2:21:49.42

=== 4 × 10 km relay ===
21 February 1974

Medal	Team	Time
Gold	East Germany (Gerd Hessler, Dieter Meinel, Gerhard Grimmer, Gert-Dietmar Klause)	2:03:15.85
Silver	Soviet Union (Ivan Garanin, Fyodor Simashev, Vasily Rochev, Yuri Skobov)	2:03:25.31
Bronze	Norway (Magne Myrmo, Odd Martinsen, Ivar Formo, Oddvar Brå)	2:03:46.03

== Women's cross-country ==
=== 5 km ===
18 February 1974

Medal	Athlete	Time
Gold	Galina Kulakova (URS)	15:17.42
Silver	Blanka Paulů (TCH)	15:19.15
Bronze	Raisa Smetanina (URS)	15:34.80

=== 10 km ===
20 February 1974

Medal	Athlete	Time
Gold	Galina Kulakova (URS)	31:25.78
Silver	Barbara Petzold (GDR)	31:50.55
Bronze	Helena Takalo (FIN)	31:59.54

=== 4 × 5 km relay ===
23 February 1974

Medal	Team	Time
Gold	Soviet Union (Nina Fyodorova, Nina Selyunina, Raisa Smetanina, Galina Kulakova)	1:02:57.39
Silver	East Germany (Sigrun Krause, Petra Hinze, Barbara Petzold, Veronika Hesse)	1:03:09.14
Bronze	Czechoslovakia (Alena Bartošová, Gabriela Sekajová, Miroslava Jaškovská, Blanka Paulů)	1:03:52.57

== Men's Nordic combined ==
=== Individual ===
17–18 February 1974

Medal	Athlete	Points
Gold	Ulrich Wehling (GDR)	
Silver	Günter Deckert (GDR)	
Bronze	Stefan Hula (POL)	

== Men's ski jumping ==
=== Individual normal hill ===
16 February 1974

Medal	Athlete	Points
Gold	Hans-Georg Aschenbach (GDR)	258.9
Silver	Dietrich Kampf (GDR)	241.2
Bronze	Aleksey Borovitin (URS)	239.3

=== Individual large hill ===
23 February 1974

Medal	Athlete	Points
Gold	Hans-Georg Aschenbach (GDR)	240.4
Silver	Heinz Wossipiwo (GDR)	223.3
Bronze	Rudolf Höhnl (TCH)	217.1

== Medal table ==
Rank	Nation	Gold	Silver	Bronze	Total
1	East Germany (GDR)	5	6	0	11
2	Soviet Union (URS)	3	1	3	7
3	Norway (NOR)	1	0	1	2
3	Sweden (SWE)	1	0	1	2
5	Czechoslovakia (TCH)	0	2	2	4
6	Finland (FIN)	0	1	1	2
7	Poland (POL)	0	0	2	2
Totals (7 entries)		10	10	10	30
