= Rudolf Größwang =

German luger (born 1947)

Medal record

Men's Luge

Representing West Germany

World Cup Overall winner
| Bronze medal – third place | 1977-78 | Men's doubles |

European Championships
| Bronze medal – third place | 1972 Königssee | Men's doubles |
| Bronze medal – third place | 1977 Königssee | Men's doubles |

Rudolf Größwang (born 1 April 1947) is a West German former luger who competed in the 1970s. He won two bronze medals in the men's doubles event at the FIL European Luge Championships (1972, 1977).

Größwang also finished fourth in the men's doubles event at the 1976 Winter Olympics in Innsbruck.

His best overall Luge World Cup finish was third in men's doubles in the 1977-8 inaugural season.

After retiring from luge, Größwang formed Rudi Größwang Services (RGS), a marketing firm in Germany that has been involved in the marketing of the International Luge Federation (FIL) since the mid-1990s. This includes partnering with FIL's longtime sponsors Viessmann and Eberspächer.
