= Christine Scheiblich =

East German rower

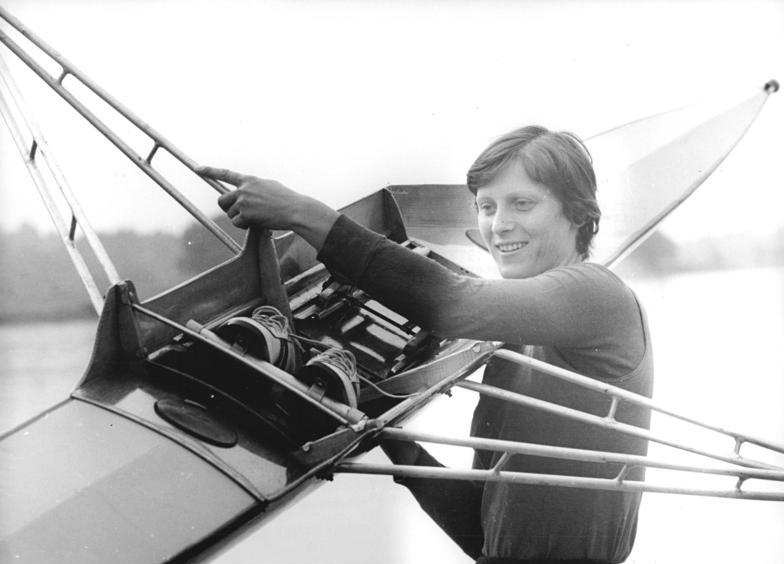
- Scheiblich in 1977

Personal information
- Born: 31 December 1954 (age 71) Wilsdruff, East Germany
- Years active: 1968–1978
- Height: 172 cm (5 ft 8 in)
- Weight: 68 kg (150 lb)
- Spouse: Ulrich Hahn

Sport
- Sport: Rowing
- Club: SC Einheit Dresden
Medal record
Women's rowing
Representing East Germany
Olympic Games
Gold medal – first place	1976 Montreal	Single sculls
World Rowing Championships
Gold medal – first place	1974 Lucerne	Single sculls
Gold medal – first place	1975 Nottingham	Single sculls
Gold medal – first place	1977 Amsterdam	Single sculls
Gold medal – first place	1978 Karapiro	Single sculls

Christine Hahn-Scheiblich (née Scheiblich; born 31 December 1954) is a German rower and Olympic champion.

Scheiblich was born in 1954 in Wilsdruff, Saxony. She took up rowing in 1968.

She received a gold medal in single sculls at the 1976 Summer Olympics in Montreal. Her last competition was the 1978 World Rowing Championships in New Zealand where she won her final gold medal.

On 22 July 1978, Scheiblich married Ulrich Hahn, who was a world championship luger during the late 1970s and early 1980s. Scheiblich studied physiotherapy from 1978 to 1981 and later worked in that occupation in Dresden.
