= Nina Shebalina =

Soviet cross-country skier

Personal information
- Nationality: Soviet
- Born: 10 June 1946 (age 79) Novgorod, Soviet Union

Sport
- Sport: Cross-country skiing

Nina Shebalina (born 10 June 1946) is a Soviet cross-country skier. She competed in the women's 10 kilometres at the 1972 Winter Olympics.

== Cross-country skiing results ==
=== Olympic Games ===
Year	Age	5 km	10 km	3 × 5 km relay
1972	30	—	10	—
