= Franz Schachner =

Austrian luger (born 1950)

Medal record

Luge

Representing Austria

Olympic Games
Bronze medal – third place	1976 Innsbruck	Men's doubles

World Championships
Bronze medal – third place	1974 Königssee	Men's doubles
Bronze medal – third place	1975 Hammarstrand	Men's doubles

European Championships
Silver medal – second place	1970 Hammarstrand	Men's doubles

Franz Schachner (born 20 July 1950) is an Austrian former competitive luger who competed during the mid-1970s. Teamed with Rudolf Schmid together they won the bronze medal in the men's doubles event at the 1976 Winter Olympics of Innsbruck.

Schachner also won two bronze medals in the men's doubles event at the FIL World Luge Championships (1974, 1975). He also won a silver at the 1970 FIL European Luge Championships in Hammarstrand, Sweden.
