= Margit Graf =

Austrian luger

Medal record

Luge

World Championships
Bronze medal – third place	1977 Igls	Women's singles

European Championships
Bronze medal – third place	1977 Königssee	Women's singles

Margit Graf (born 20 March 1951) is an Austrian luger who competed during the 1970s. She won the bronze medal in the women's singles event at the 1977 FIL World Luge Championships in Igls, Austria.

At the 1977 FIL European Luge Championships in Königssee, West Germany, Graf won a bronze medal in the women's singles event.

She also finished sixth in the women's singles event at the 1976 Winter Olympics in Innsbruck.
