= Dana Spálenská =

Czech luger

Medal record

Luge

Representing Czechoslovakia

World Championships
Bronze medal – third place	1975 Hammarstrand	Women's singles

Dana Spálenská (née Dana Beldová; born 10 February 1950) is a Czech former luger who competed for Czechoslovakia during the 1970s. She won the bronze medal at the 1975 FIL World Luge Championships in Hammarstrand, Sweden.

Spálenská also finished tenth in the women's singles event at the 1976 Winter Olympics in Innsbruck.

== Life ==
Dana Beldová was born on 10 February 1950 in Jablonec nad Nisou, but she is native of the nearby town of Smržovka, where her parents lived. Her father Jaroslav Belda was an official of the luge sport and got Dana into luging.
