= Mariann Ambrus =

Hungarian rower (1956–2007)

Personal information
- Full name: Mariann Ambrus-Feketé
- Born: 24 April 1956 Budapest
- Died: 19 October 2007 (aged 51)
- Height: 178 cm (5 ft 10 in)
- Weight: 72 kg (159 lb)

Sport
- Sport: Rowing
- Club: Magyar Hajó- és Darugyár Sport Club
Medal record
Women's rowing
Representing Hungary
World Championships
Silver medal – second place	1975 Nottingham	Single sculls (W1x)
Bronze medal – third place	1977 Amsterdam	Single sculls (W1x)
Bronze medal – third place	1978 Lake Karapiro	Single sculls (W1x)

Mariann Ambrus (later Feketé, 24 April 1956 – 19 October 2007) was a Hungarian rower. She competed in the single sculls at the 1976 and 1980 Summer Olympics. She was born and died in Budapest.

Awards
Preceded by Ilona Bruzsenyák	Hungarian Sportswoman of The Year; 1975	Succeeded by Ildikó Tordasi
Preceded by Ildikó Tordasi	Hungarian Sportswoman of The Year; 1977	Succeeded by Judit Magos
