= Rositsa Spasova =

Bulgarian rower (born 1954)

Personal information
- Nationality: Bulgarian
- Born: 28 November 1954 (age 71)
- Height: 171 cm (5 ft 7 in)
- Weight: 69 kg (152 lb)

Sport
- Sport: Rowing
Medal record
Women's rowing
Representing Bulgaria
World Rowing Championships
| Bronze medal – third place | 1977 Amsterdam | Coxed quad scull |
| Gold medal – first place | 1978 Karapiro | Coxed quad scull |

Rositsa Spasova (Bulgarian: Росица Спасова; born 28 November 1954) is a Bulgarian rower. She competed at the 1976 Summer Olympics and the 1980 Summer Olympics.
