= Christine Phillip =

German cross-country skier (born 1947)

Personal information
- Nationality: German
- Born: 2 August 1947 (age 78) Oberwiesenthal, Soviet occupation zone of Germany

Sport
- Sport: Cross-country skiing

Christine Phillip (born 2 August 1947) is a German former cross-country skier. She competed in two events at the 1972 Winter Olympics.

== Cross-country skiing results ==
=== Olympic Games ===
Year	Age	5 km	10 km	3 × 5 km relay
1972	24	30	31	—
