= Ulrich Hahn =

German luger (born 1955)

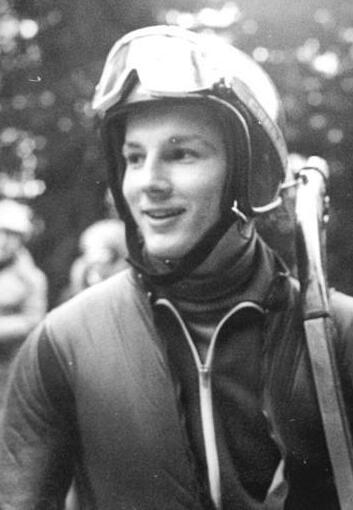
- Hahn at the 1975 GDR championships

Medal record

Luge

World Championships
Gold medal – first place	1974 Königssee	Men's doubles
Gold medal – first place	1981 Hammarstrand	Men's doubles

European Championships
Silver medal – second place	1973 Königssee	Men's doubles
Silver medal – second place	1978 Hammarstrand	Men's doubles
Silver medal – second place	1980 Olang	Men's doubles
Bronze medal – third place	1975 Olang	Men's doubles

Ulrich Hahn (born 5 November 1955 in Elbingerode) is an East German luger who competed from the mid-1970s to the early 1980s. He won two gold medals in the men's doubles event at the FIL World Luge Championships (1974, 1981).

He also won four medals in the men's doubles event at the FIL European Luge Championships with three silvers (1973, 1978, 1980) and one bronze (1975).

Competing in two Winter Olympics, he earned his best finish of fourth in the men's doubles event at Lake Placid, New York, in 1980.

As of 2007, Hahn is track manager of the bobsled, luge, and skeleton track in Altenberg, Germany.

His wife, Christine Scheiblich, won the gold medal in the women's single sculls at the 1976 Summer Olympics in Montreal, Quebec.
