= Dieter Meinel =

East German cross-country skier (1949–2026)

Medal record

Men's cross-country skiing

World Championships
Gold medal – first place	1974 Falun	4 x 10 km

Dieter Meinel (28 December 1949 – 30 May 2026) was an East Germany cross-country skier who competed in the 1970s. He earned a gold medal in the 4 x 10 km at the 1974 FIS Nordic World Ski Championships in Falun. His best Olympic finish was 33rd twice in the 30 km and 50 km events in the 1976 Winter Olympics in Innsbruck.
