= Harald Ehrig =

East German luger (born 1949)

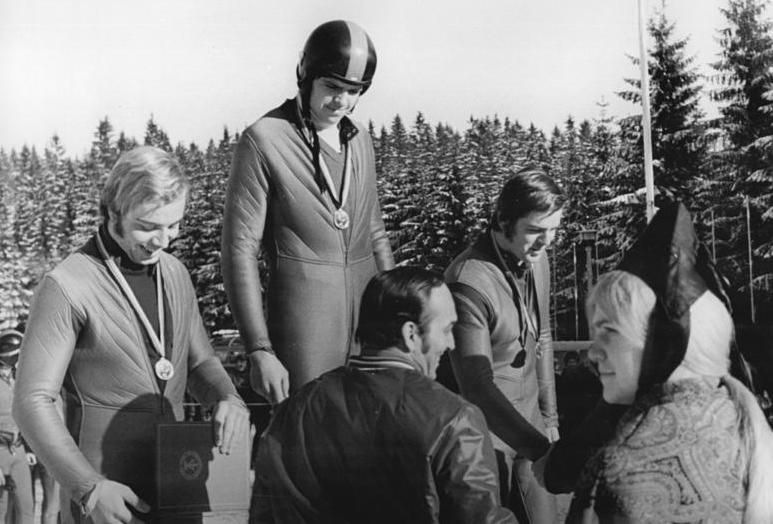
- Ehrig (second from right) in 1973.
Medal record
Men's luge
Representing East Germany
Olympic Games
| Silver medal – second place | 1972 Sapporo | Men's singles |
World Championships
| Bronze medal – third place | 1973 Oberhof | Men's singles |
| Bronze medal – third place | 1975 Hammarstrand | Men's singles |
European Championships
| Gold medal – first place | 1970 Hammarstrand | Men's singles |
| Silver medal – second place | 1972 Königssee | Men's singles |

Harald Ehrig (born 6 November 1949 in Zwickau, Saxony) is an East German former luger who competed from the mid-1960s to the early 1970s. He won the silver medal in the men's singles event at the 1972 Winter Olympics in Sapporo.

Ehrig won two bronze medals in the men's singles event at the FIL World Luge Championships (1973, 1975). He also won two medals in the men's singles event at the FIL European Luge Championships with a gold in 1970 and a silver in 1972.
