= Eberhard Klessen =

German cross-country skier (born 1949)

Personal information
- Nationality: German
- Born: 16 November 1949 (age 75); Meiningen, East Germany

Sport
- Sport: Cross-country skiing

Eberhard Klessen (born 16 November 1949) is a German former cross-country skier. He competed in the men's 30 kilometre event at the 1972 Winter Olympics.
