= Klaus Wunderlich (speed skater) =

German speed skater

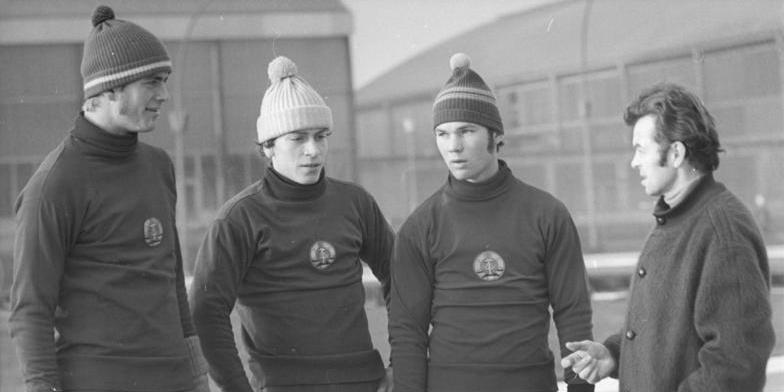
- Klaus Wunderlich (second from left) in 1972

Personal information
- Nationality: East Germany
- Born: 10 August 1951 (age 73); East Berlin, East Germany

Sport
- Sport: Speed skating

Klaus Wunderlich (born 10 August 1951) is a German speed skater. He competed in three events at the 1976 Winter Olympics.

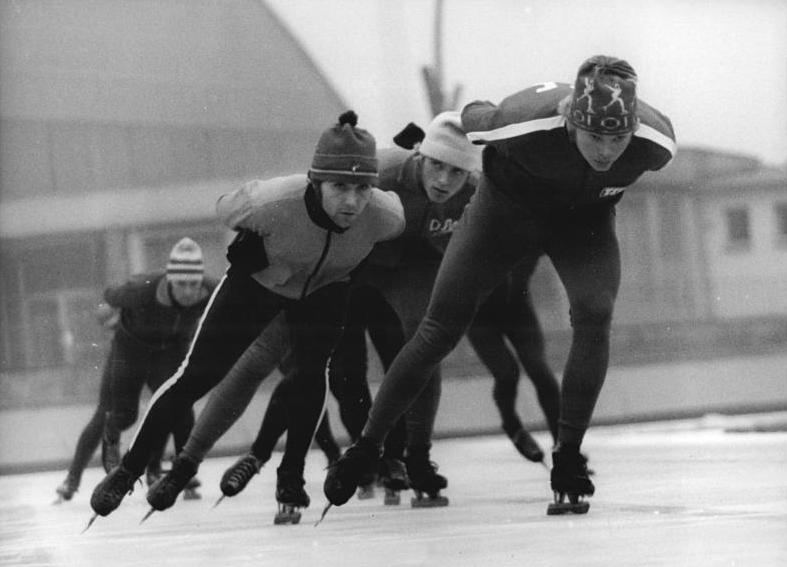
Klaus Wunderlich (second from right) training, in 1975
