= Ewa Ambroziak =

Polish rower (1950–2023)

Ewa Ambroziak (9 November 1950 – 26 July 2023) was a Polish rower who competed at the 1976 Summer Olympics.

== Biography ==
Ewa Ambroziak Szczecin, Poland was born on 9 November 1950. She graduated from the Pedagogical University of Kraków. Ambroziak played in the sports club SKS Czarni Szczecin. Her trainer was Ryszard Kędzierski.

Ambroziak later became a gym teacher, and Master of sport who was awarded the PZTW medals. She latterly lived in the United States. She died on 26 July 2023, at the age of 72.

== Placings ==
- 1972 – 6th place at the European Championships in Brandenburg (singles)
- 1973 – 5th place at the European Championships in Moscow
- 1973 – Polish champion (singles);
- 1974 – 4th place at the World Championships in Lucerne (in representative talon double with Mieczysława Franczyk)
- 1975 – 6th place at the World Championships in Nottingham (singles);
- 1976 – 9th place during the Olympic Games in Montreal (singles) - fifth in the run (3: 58.09), fourth place Repechage (4: 16.74) and ninth place in the final B (4: 26.60).

== See also ==
- Poland at the 1976 Summer Olympics

== Sources ==
- Lexicon of Polish Olympians (Bogdan Tuszyński, Henryk Kurzyński, 2007), the Fundacja Dobrej Książki, Warszaw 2007, ISBN 978-83-86320-10-3
