= Harald Oehme =

German speed skater

Personal information
- Nationality: German
- Born: 3 September 1953 (age 71); Zschopau, East Germany

Sport
- Sport: Speed skating

Harald Oehme (born 3 September 1953) is a German speed skater. He competed in two events at the 1976 Winter Olympics.
