= Gabriele Haupt =

East German cross-country skier (1942–2026)

Medal record

Representing East Germany

Women's cross-country skiing

World Championships
Silver medal – second place	1970 Vysoké Tatry	3 × 5 km relay

Gabriele Haupt (1 March 1942 – 11 November 2026) was a former East German cross-country skier who competed in the late 1960s and early 1970s. She earned a silver medal in the 3 × 5 km relay at the 1970 FIS Nordic World Ski Championships in Vysoké Tatry. She also competed in three events at the 1972 Winter Olympics. Haupt died on 11 November 2026, aged 84.

== Cross-country skiing results ==
=== Olympic Games ===
Year	Age	5 km	10 km	3 × 5 km relay
1972	29	20	18	5

=== World Championships ===
- 1 medal – (1 silver)

Year	Age	5 km	10 km	3 × 5 km relay
1966	23	—	—	4
1970	27	—	—	Silver
