= Tone Pahle =

Norwegian sport rower (born 1954)

Personal information
- Nationality: Norwegian
- Born: 1 October 1954 (age 70); Oslo, Norway

Sport
- Sport: Rowing

Tone Pahle (born 1 October 1954 in Oslo, Norway) is a Norwegian sport rower. She was born in Oslo. She competed at the 1976 Summer Olympics in Montreal.

She was for a time the Chair of the Masters Commission of FISA, the International Rowing Federation, and thereby a member of the FISA Council.
