= Ute Dix =

German speed skater

Personal information
- Nationality: German
- Born: 10 September 1955 (age 69); Reichenbach, East Germany

Sport
- Sport: Speed skating

Ute Dix (born 10 September 1955) is a German speed skater. She competed in two events at the 1976 Winter Olympics.
