= Heike Lange =

German speed skater

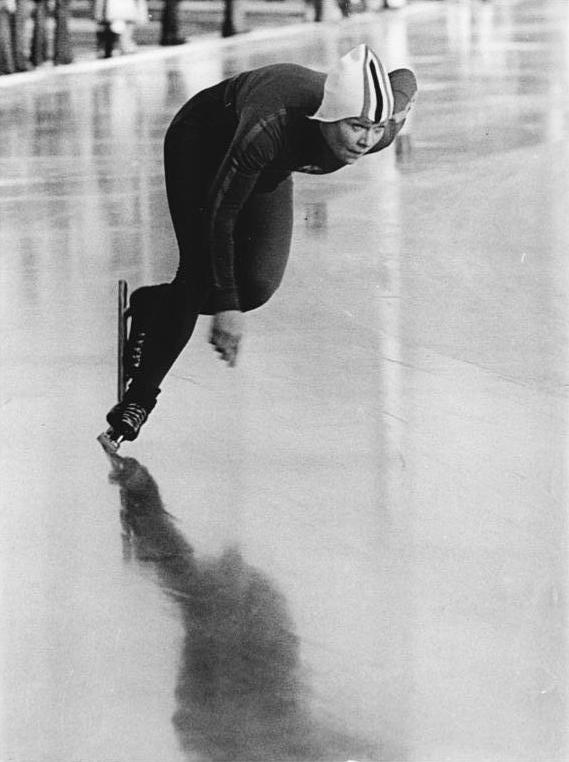
- Heike Lange in 1974

Personal information
- Nationality: German
- Born: 31 October 1955 (age 69); Rostock, East Germany

Sport
- Sport: Speed skating

Heike Lange (born 31 October 1955) is a German speed skater. She competed for East Germany in two events at the 1976 Winter Olympics.
