= Monika Debertshäuser =

East German cross-country skier (born 1952)

Personal information
- Born: 18 September 1952 (age 74) Sonneberg, East Germany

Sport
- Sport: Skiing
- Club: SC Motor Zella-Mehlis
Medal record
Women's cross-country skiing
Representing East Germany
Olympic Games
Bronze medal – third place	1976 Innsbruck	4 × 5 km relay

Monika Debertshäuser (later Heßler, born 18 September 1952) is a former East German cross-country skier who competed during the 1970s. She won a bronze medal in the 4 × 5 km relay at the 1976 Winter Olympics in Innsbruck. She was later married to Gerd Heßler but divorced.
