= Eva-Maria Wernicke =

German luger

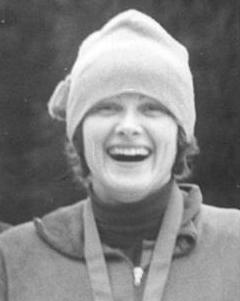
- Wernicke in 1976.
Medal record
Luge
World Championships
| Bronze medal – third place | 1973 Oberhof | Women's singles |
European Championships
| Silver medal – second place | 1975 Olang | Women's singles |
| Bronze medal – third place | 1973 Königssee | Women's singles |

Eva-Maria Wernicke (born 30 September 1953 in Beierfeld) is an East German luger who competed during the 1970s and early 1980s. She won the bronze medal in the women's singles event at the 1973 FIL World Luge Championships in Oberhof, East Germany.

Wernicke also won two medals in the women's singles event at the FIL European Luge Championships with a silver in 1975 and a bronze in 1973.

She also competed in the women's singles event at the 1976 Winter Olympics in Innsbruck, finishing fourth.

After her retirement from luge in the early 1980s, Wernicke became an instructor in luge in Leipzig. She also married and became a mother of two daughters. Following the German reunification in 1990, Wenicke left Germany two years later and became a secretary in Bern, Switzerland.
