= Rosemarie Taupadel =

German speed skater

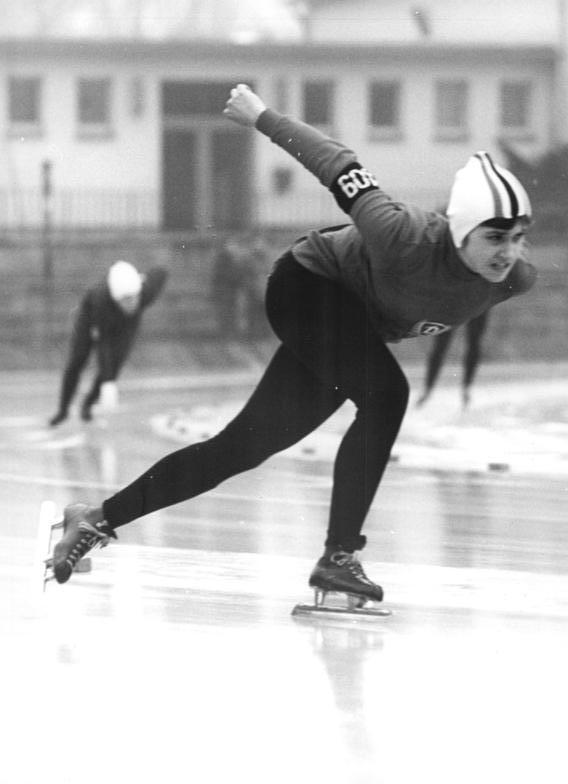
- Rosemarie Taupadel in 1971

Personal information
- Nationality: German
- Born: 25 February 1952 (age 73); Berlin, Germany

Sport
- Sport: Speed skating

Rosemarie Taupadel (born 25 February 1952) is a German speed skater. She competed in three events at the 1972 Winter Olympics.
