= Ingrid Munneke-Dusseldorp =

Dutch rower (born 1946)

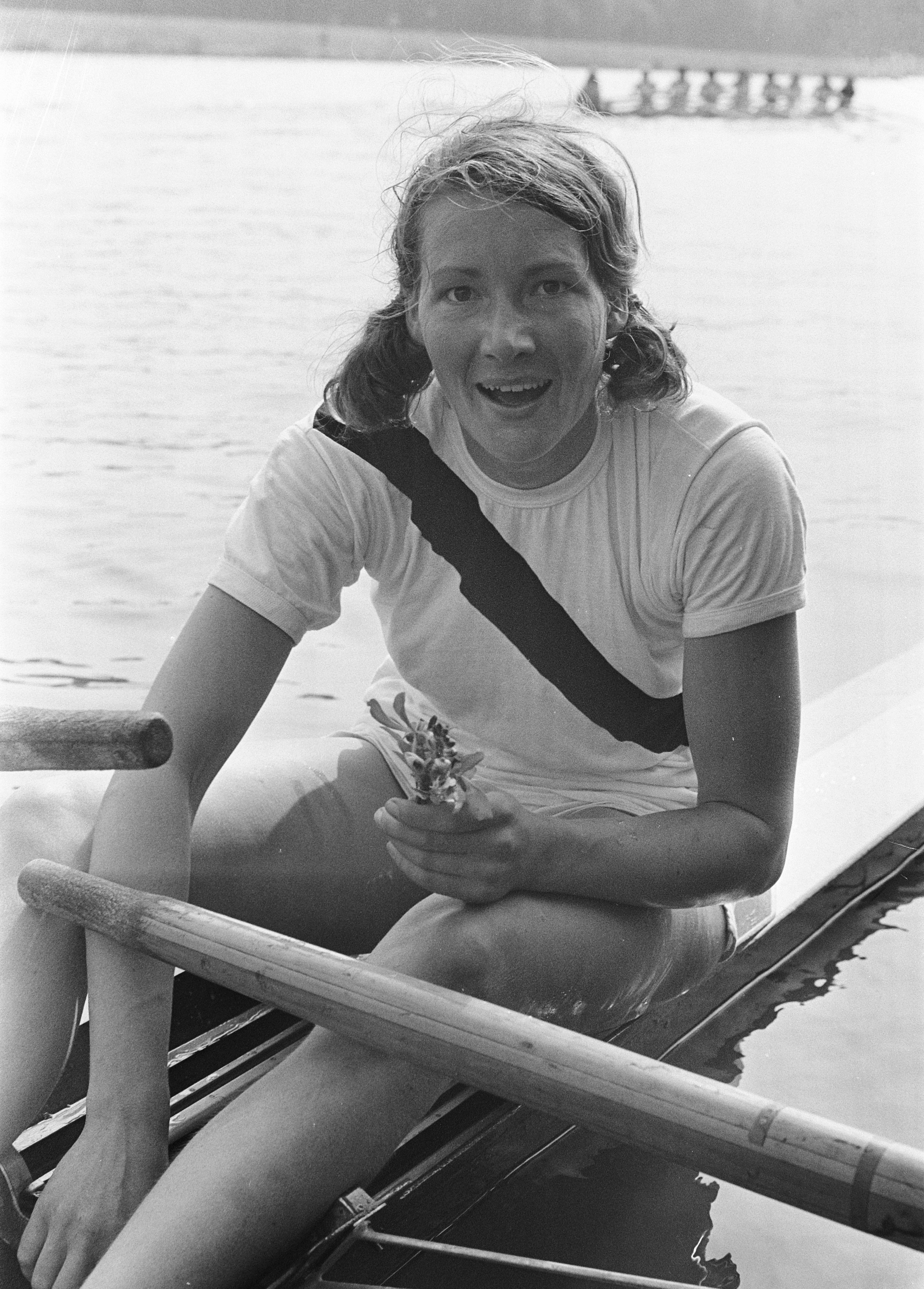
- Ingrid Munneke-Dusseldorp in 1972

Personal information
- Born: Ingrid Maria Dusseldorp; 24 April 1946 (age 80) Amsterdam, the Netherlands
- Height: 1.82 m (6 ft 0 in)
- Weight: 75 kg (165 lb)
- Spouse: Jannes Munneke

Sport
- Sport: Rowing
- Club: Aegir, Groningen
Medal record
Rowing
Representing the Netherlands
World Rowing Championships
Silver medal – second place	1974 Lucerne	Coxed four
European Rowing Championships
Silver medal – second place	1970 Tata	Single sculls
Gold medal – first place	1972 Brandenburg	Single sculls

Ingrid Maria Munneke-Dusseldorp (née Dusseldorp, born 24 April 1946) is a retired Dutch rower who won the European title in single sculls in 1972. Four years later she competed in this event at the 1976 Summer Olympics and finished in fifth place. Her husband Jannes Munneke is also an Olympic rower.
