= Dettlef Günther =

East German luger (born 1954)

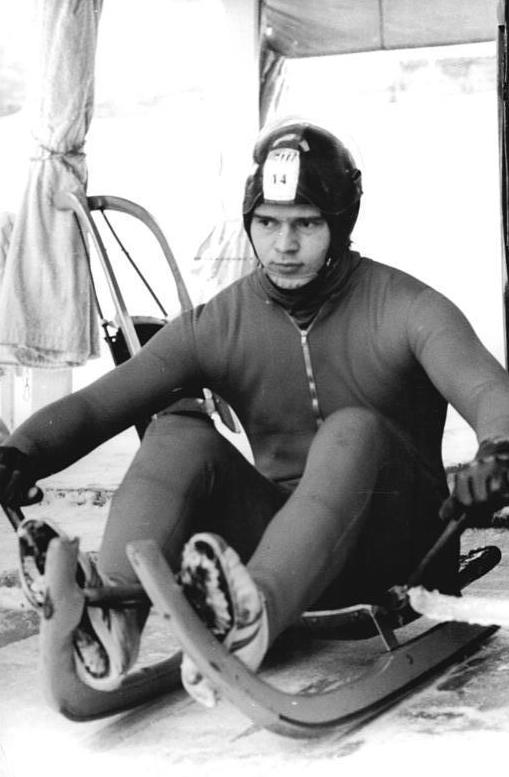
- Günther at the 1980 Winter Olympics in Lake Placid.
Medal record
Men's Luge
Representing East Germany
Olympic Games
Gold medal – first place	1976 Innsbruck	Men's singles
World Championships
Gold medal – first place	1979 Königssee	Men's singles
European Championships
Gold medal – first place	1975 Olang	Men's singles
Silver medal – second place	1979 Oberhof	Men's singles

Dettlef Günther (sometimes shown as Detlef Günther, born 27 August 1954 in Erlabrunn, Saxony) is an East German former luger who competed from the mid-1970s to the early 1980s. He won the gold medal in the men's singles event at the 1976 Winter Olympics in Innsbruck. At the 1980 Winter Olympics in Lake Placid, New York, Günther was favored to repeat after leading the first two runs, but crashed at the end of the third run causing him to lose three seconds and settling for fourth in the standings.

Günther also won the gold medal in the men's singles event at the 1979 FIL World Luge Championships in Königssee, West Germany. He also won two medals in the men's singles event at the FIL European Luge Championships with a gold in 1975 and a silver in 1979.
