= Günter Deckert (Nordic combined) =

German Nordic combined skier (1950–2005)

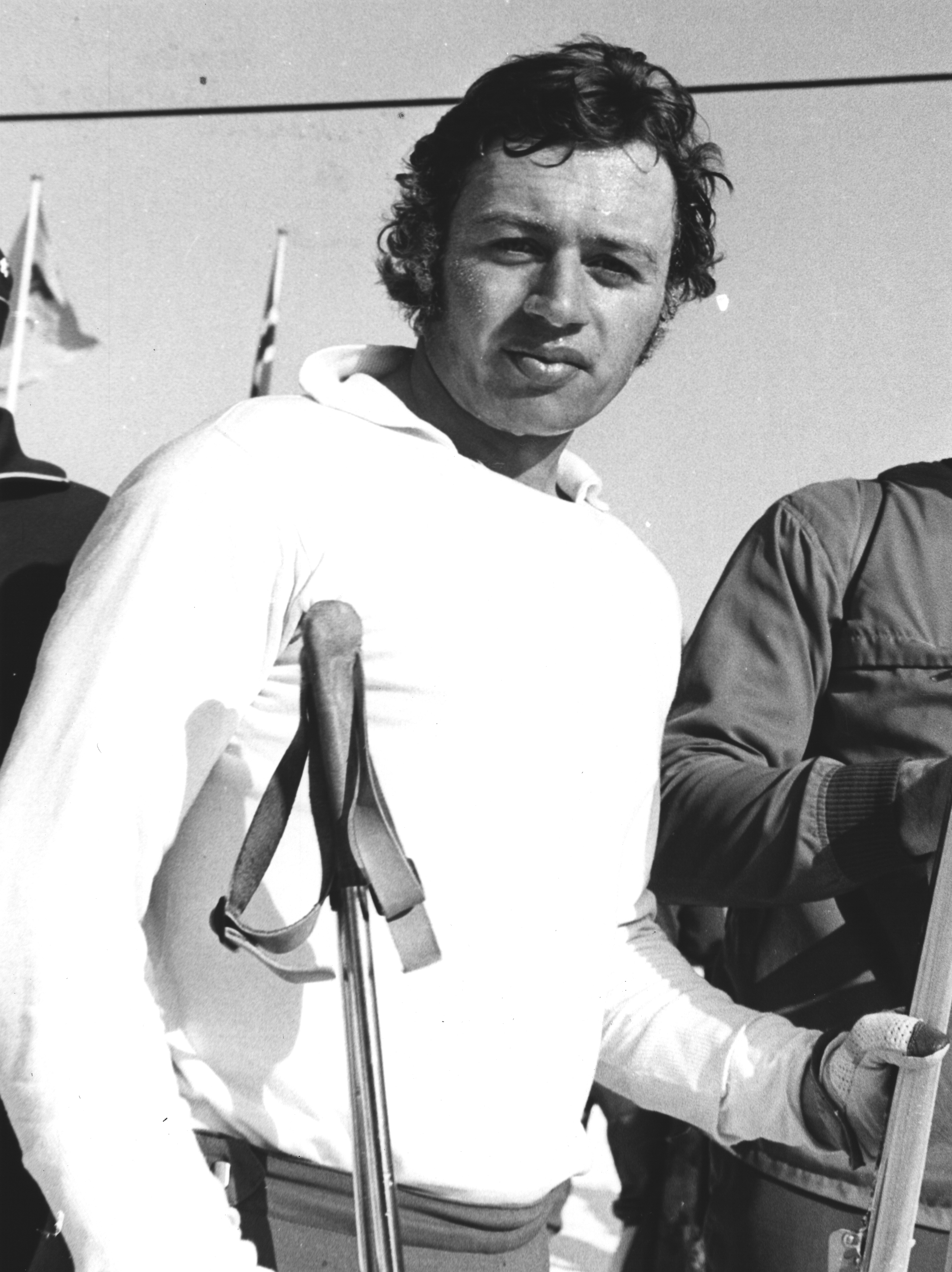
- Günter Deckert in 1972

Medal record

Representing East Germany

Men's Nordic combined

World Championships
Silver medal – second place	1974 Falun	Individual

Günter Deckert (14 September 1950 in Ehrenfriedersdorf – 24 November 2005) was an East German Nordic combined skier who competed in the early 1970s. He won a silver medal in the individual event at the 1974 FIS Nordic World Ski Championships in Falun. He competed for the Sportvereinigung (SV) Dynamo. He also competed at the 1972 Winter Olympics and the 1976 Winter Olympics.
