= Gerd Heßler =

East German cross-country skier (born 1948)

Medal record

Men's cross-country skiing

World Championships
Gold medal – first place	1974 Falun	4 × 10 km
Silver medal – second place	1970 Vysoké Tatry	4 × 10 km

Gerd Heßler (born 13 September 1948 in Tannenbergsthal) is a former East German cross-country skier who competed in the 1970s. He earned two medals in the 4 × 10 km at the FIS Nordic World Ski Championships with a gold (1974) and a silver (1970).

Hessler was also part of the 4 × 10 km relay team that finished 6th at the 1972 Winter Olympics in Sapporo. He was at some stage married to the cross country skier Monika Debertshäuser.
