= Rainer Groß (skier) =

German cross-country skier (born 1947)

Personal information
- Nationality: German
- Born: 18 June 1947 (age 78); Wünschendorf/Elster, Soviet occupation zone in Germany

Sport
- Sport: Cross-country skiing

Rainer Groß (born 18 June 1947) is a German cross-country skier. He competed in the men's 15 kilometre event at the 1972 Winter Olympics.
