= Ute Rührold =

East German luger

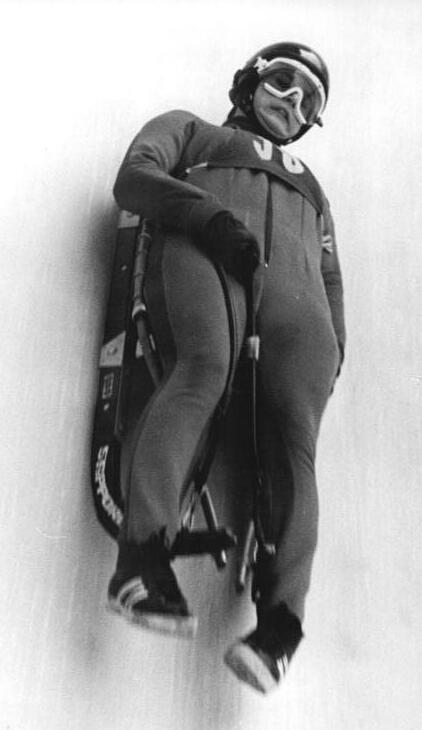
- Rührold in 1971
Medal record
Women's Luge
Representing East Germany
Olympic Games
Silver medal – second place	1972 Sapporo	Women's singles
Silver medal – second place	1976 Innsbruck	Women's singles
World Championships
Silver medal – second place	1973 Oberhof	Women's singles
Silver medal – second place	1975 Hammarstrand	Women's singles
Bronze medal – third place	1974 Königssee	Women's singles
European Championships
Gold medal – first place	1972 Königssee	Women's singles
Silver medal – second place	1973 Königssee	Women's singles
Bronze medal – third place	1974 Imst	Women's singles

Ute Rührold (later Böhme then Klawonn, born 9 December 1954) is a former East German luger who competed during the 1970s. She won two consecutive silver medals in the women's singles event at Winter Olympics (1972, 1976).

Rührold also won three medals at the FIL World Luge Championships with two silvers (1973, 1975) and one bronze (1974). Additionally, she won a complete set of medals at the FIL European Luge Championships with a gold in 1972, a silver in 1973, and a bronze in 1974.
