= FIL European Luge Championships 1972 =

The FIL European Luge Championships 1972 took place in Königssee, West Germany for the second time after previously hosting the event in 1967. It also marked the first time the event took place a permanent artificially refrigerated track which opened in early 1969.

== Men's singles ==
Medal	Athlete	Time
Gold	Wolfgang Scheidel (GDR)	
Silver	Harald Ehrig (GDR)	
Bronze	Leonhard Nagenrauft (FRG)	

== Women's singles ==
Medal	Athlete	Time
Gold	Ute Rührold (GDR)	
Silver	Elisabeth Demleitner (FRG)	
Bronze	Anna-Maria Müller (GDR)	

== Men's doubles ==
Medal	Athlete	Time
Gold	East Germany (Horst Hörnlein, Reinhard Bredlow)	
Silver	West Germany (Hans Brandner, Balthasar Schwarm)	
Bronze	West Germany (Peter Reichnwallner, Rudolf Grosswang)	

== Medal table ==
Rank	Nation	Gold	Silver	Bronze	Total
1	East Germany (GDR)	3	1	1	5
2	West Germany (FRG)	0	2	2	4
Totals (2 entries)		3	3	3	9
